= List of Charlie's Angels characters =

Recurring characters found in the Charlie's Angels franchise include:

== In television ==
=== 1976 series ===
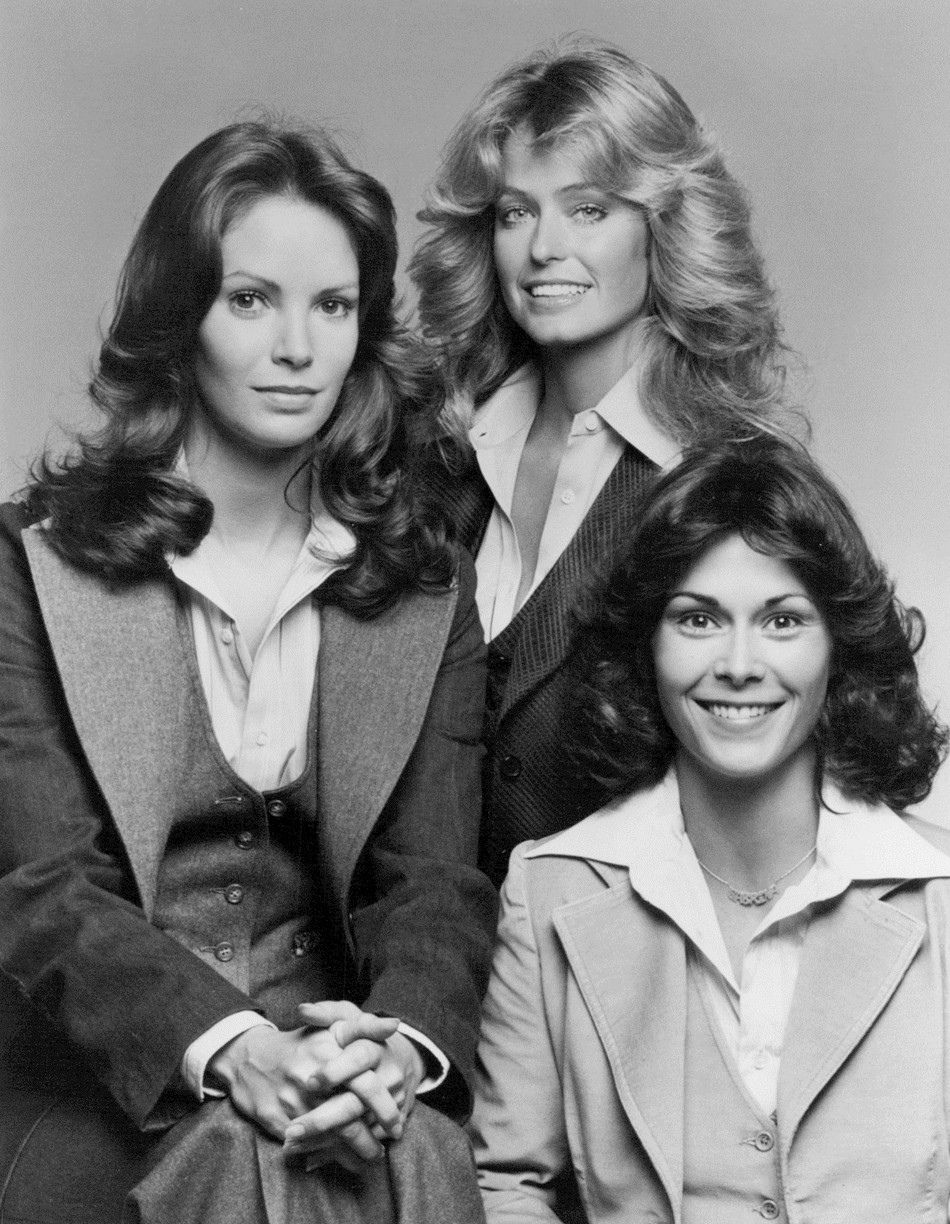
The cast of season 1: Jaclyn Smith, Farrah Fawcett and Kate Jackson.

Characters in the 1976–81 television series Charlie's Angels include:

- Kelly Garrett (Jaclyn Smith) (1976–1981, 2003, 2019) and young Kelly (Tonya Crowe) (1976; season 1)
- Sabrina Duncan (Kate Jackson) (1976–1979)
- Jill Munroe (Farrah Fawcett) (1976–1977, regular) (1978–1980, guest star 6 episodes)
- Kris Munroe (Cheryl Ladd) (1977–1981) and young Kris (Jordan Ladd) (1978; season 3)
- Tiffany Welles (Shelley Hack) (1979–1980)
- Julie Rogers (Tanya Roberts) (1980–1981)
- John Bosley (David Doyle) (1976–1981)
- Charles "Charlie" Townsend (John Forsythe) (voice) (1976–1981, 2000–2003)
- Scott Woodville (David Ogden Stiers) (Charlie's majordomo in the pilot episode)

=== 2011 series ===
Characters in the 2011 reboot series Charlie's Angels include:

- Kate Prince (Annie Ilonzeh)
- Abigail "Abby" Simpson (Rachael Taylor)
- Eve French (Minka Kelly) and young Eve (Taylor Blackwell)
- Gloria Martinez (Nadine Velazquez) and young Gloria (Anahi Artica)
- Zoe Sinclair / Oswald (Peyton List) (Villain)
- John Bosley (Ramon Rodriguez)
- Charles "Charlie" Townsend (Victor Garber) (voice)
- Samantha Masters (Erica Durance)
- Ray Goodson (Isaiah Mustafa)
- Victor Simpson (John Terry)

=== Others spin-off series ===
Characters that would have been in Angels '89 include:

- Connie Bates (Claire Yarlett)
- Pam Ryan (Karen Kopins)
- Trisha Lawrence (Sandra Canning)
- Bernie Colter (Téa Leoni)

Characters that appeared in the Telemundo Network version called Ángeles in 1998 include:

- Elena Sanchez (Sandra Vidal)
- Adriana Vega (Patricia Manterola)
- Gina Navarro (Cole Pitman)

Characters that appeared in the German version called Wilde Engel from 2003 to 2005 include:

- Christina "Chris" Rabe (Birgit Stauber) (2002-2003)
- Franziska Borgardt (Susann Uplegger) (2002-2003)
- Lena Heitmann (Eva Habermann) (2002-2003)
- Rebecca (Vanessa Petruo) (2005)
- Ida (Tanja Wenzel) (2005)
- Aiko (Zora Holt) (2005)

Characters that appeared in the Taiwanese version called Asian Charlie's Angels in 2004 include:

- Betty (Qu Ying)
- Cindy (Kelly Lin)
- Annabelle (Annie Wu)
- Angie (Christy Chung)

== In film ==
Characters in the first and second installments in the film series, Charlie's Angels (2000) and the sequel, Charlie's Angels: Full Throttle, include:

- Natalie Cook (Cameron Diaz)
- Dylan Sanders (Drew Barrymore)
- Alexandra "Alex" Munday (Lucy Liu)
- Thin Man / Anthony (Crispin Glover)
- Jason Gibbons (Matt LeBlanc)
- Pete Komisky (Luke Wilson)
- John Bosley (Bill Murray)
- Eric Knox (Sam Rockwell)
- Roger Corwin (Tim Curry)
- Vivian Wood (Kelly Lynch)
- Jimmy Bosley (Bernie Mac)
- Madison Lee (Demi Moore)
- Seamus O'Grady (Justin Theroux)

Characters in the third installment in the film series, Charlie's Angels (2019), include:

- Sabina Wilson (Kristen Stewart)
- Elena Houghlin (Naomi Scott)
- Jane Kano (Ella Balinska)
- Rebekah "Bosley" (Elizabeth Banks)
- Edgar "Bosley" Dessange (Djimon Hounsou)
- John Bosley (Patrick Stewart)
- Charles "Charlie" Townsend (Robert Clotworthy) (voice)
  - "Charlie", head of agency (Jaclyn Smith) (reveal)
- Ingrid (Hannah Hoekstra)
- The Saint (Luis Gerardo Méndez)
- Langston (Noah Centineo)
- Alexander Brock (Sam Claflin)
- Hodak (Jonathan Tucker)
- Fight Instructor (Ronda Rousey)
