= List of people from Lincoln, Nebraska =

This is a list of people from Lincoln, Nebraska.

List of people from Lincoln, Nebraska, in alphabetical order
Name	DOB	DOD	Career	Notability
Hazel Abel	1888	1966	Teacher and politician	First woman from Nebraska elected to serve in U.S. Senate
Nancy C. Andreasen	1938		Neuroscientist	One of the world's foremost authorities on schizophrenia
Emma M. Baegl	1896	1998	Artist	Artist and educator
Fred Beebe	1879	1957	Professional baseball player	Pitcher for five Major League Baseball teams
Shawn Bouwens	1968		Professional football player	Played for NFL's Detroit Lions and Jacksonville Jaguars
Leslie Brooks	1922	2011	Actress	Featured in films such as Cover Girl and Blonde Ice
William Jennings Bryan	1860	1925	Lawyer, statesman, politician	Three-time Democratic Party nominee for president of the United States
Mitchell Budler	2003		Soccer player	Goalkeeper
Julian Cardona	1990		Soccer player	Forward who represented Puerto Rico
Dick Cavett	1936		Entertainer	Host of The Dick Cavett Show
Joba Chamberlain	1985		Athlete	Relief pitcher for Detroit Tigers, New York Yankees
Dick Cheney	1941	2025	Politician	Vice president of the United States under George W. Bush
Trent Claus	1979		Artist	Visual effects artist for the Marvel Cinematic Universe and other films
Amasa Cobb	1823	1905	Politician	U.S. representative from Wisconsin
Richard Cowan	1922	1944	Soldier	Posthumous Medal of Honor recipient in World War II
Ryan Cownie			Stand-up comedian	
Charlie Curtis-Beard	1997		Rapper, TikTok personality	
Charles G. Dawes	1865	1951	Banker, politician	Vice president of the United States during Coolidge administration
Sandy Dennis	1937	1992	Actress	Won an Academy Award for her role in Who's Afraid of Virginia Woolf? in 1967
David Doyle	1929	1997	Actor	Starred as "Bosley" in hit TV series Charlie's Angels
Mary Doyle	1931	1995	Actress	Starred in 1970s Broadway production Best Friend
Mignon G. Eberhart	1899	1996	Writer	Mystery Writers of America award-winning author of While the Patient Slept
Doc Edgerton	1903	1990	Engineer	Credited with popularizing the use of the electronic flash in photography
Alice Righter Edmiston	1974	1964	Artist	Visual artist
Loren Eiseley	1907	1977	Poet, science writer	Inspired the environmental movement with his writings
Jane English	1940		Politician	Member of Arkansas State Senate from North Little Rock
Deb Fischer	1951		Politician	U.S. senator for Nebraska
Caril Ann Fugate	1943		Criminal	Teenage girlfriend of murderer Charles Starkweather; youngest female in US history to be tried for first-degree murder
Ernest K. Gann	1910	1991	Author	Aviator, author of The High and The Mighty and Fate Is the Hunter
Joe Glenn	1949		Coach	College football coach, South Dakota, Montana, Wyoming, Northern Colorado
Alex Gordon	1984		Athlete	Player for 2015 World Series champion Kansas City Royals
Ashley Graham	1988		Model	Sports Illustrated swimsuit cover model
Ramiz Hamouda	2008			Soccer player
Clifton Hillegass	1918	2001	Businessman	Creator and publisher of CliffsNotes
Alice Hamlin Hinman	1869	1934	Psychologist	Educational reformer, member of Lincoln Board of Education
Rosekrans Hoffman	1926	2007	Artist, children's book illustrator	Awarded Outstanding Alumni Achievement Award in Art (1999) by UNL College of Fine Art, Nebraska
Fred Hoiberg	1972		Basketball coach	Former head coach of NBA's Chicago Bulls, current coach of Nebraska Men's Basketball
Mike Johanns	1950		Politician	Former Republican mayor of Lincoln and governor of Nebraska
Walter Keane	1915	2000	Plagiarist	Sold Margaret Keane's big-waif paintings as his own
Bob Kerrey	1943		Politician	35th governor of Nebraska and U.S. senator
Lane Kiffin	1975		Coach	Head football coach of LSU; former head coach of the Oakland Raiders, the USC Trojans, the Tennessee Volunteers, the Florida Atlantic Owls, and Ole Miss; former offensive coordinator for the Alabama Crimson Tide
Helen Klanderud	1937	2013	Politician	Former mayor of Aspen, Colorado
Jerome Kohl	1946	2020	Musicologist, journal editor	Expert of Karlheinz Stockhausen
Herman F. Kramer	1892	1964	U.S. Army officer	Commanded three divisions as a major general during World War II
Lars Krutak	1971		Anthropologist	
Ron Kurtenbach	1943		Activist	Prominent Communist and radio host
Chris Landreth	1987		Animator	Specialist in CGI
Louise Le Baron	1874	1918	Opera singer	International performer and Lincoln voice teacher
Tosca Lee	1969		Writer	Author of historical and supernatural literature
Verne Lewellen	1901	1980	Professional football player	Quarterback for Nebraska and Green Bay Packers, district attorney
Gilbert N. Lewis	1875	1946	Chemist	Developed Lewis dot structure of molecular modeling
John L. Loos	1918	2011	Historian	Historian of Lewis and Clark Expedition
Gordon MacRae	1921	1986	Actor, singer	Best known for starring in musicals Oklahoma! and Carousel
JoAnn Maxey	1940	1992	State legislator, school board member	First African-American woman to serve in the Nebraska Legislature (1977–1979)
Nathaniel Motte	1984		Musician	Singer, songwriter, producer and film composer from electric pop duo 3OH!3
Angie F. Newman	1837	1910	Social reform activist	Held important positions in the Methodist Episcopal Church, Woman's Christian Temperance Union, and Daughters of the American Revolution
Danny Noonan	1965		Professional football player	Played for NFL's Dallas Cowboys and Green Bay Packers
Dirk Obbink	1957		Papyrologist and classicist	Lecturer on papyrology and Greek literature
Nathan Phillips	1954		Political activist	Native American activist most known for his role in the 2019 Lincoln Memorial confrontation
Mary Pipher	1947		Psychologist, author	Received, and later returned, presidential citation from American Psychological Association
Roscoe Pound	1870	1964	Legal scholar and educator	Dean of Harvard University law school 1916–1936
John Bennett Ramsey	1943		Businessman	Father of JonBenét Ramsey
J. Lee Rankin	1907	1996	Politician	United States solicitor general (1956–61)
Wallace Rasmussen	1914	2008	Businessman	Chairman & CEO, Beatrice Foods Co.
Jane Raybould	1958		Politician	Member of Lincoln City Council
Shawn Redhage	1981		Professional basketball player	Plays in pro league in Australia
Barrett Ruud	1983		Professional football player	Linebacker for five NFL teams
Bo Ruud	1984		Professional football player	Linebacker for New England Patriots, Cleveland Browns
Brandon Sanderson	1975		Writer	Author of fantasy and science-fiction books
George Selk	1893	1967	Actor	Played Moss Grimmick on Gunsmoke
Coleen Seng	1936	2025	Politician	Democratic mayor of Lincoln
Lindsey Shaw	1989		Actress	Starred in Nickelodeon's sitcom Ned's Declassified School Survival Guide
Francesca Marie Smith	1985		Actress	Best known for voice roles like Helga Pataki, as well as several characters in Hey Arnold!, Recess, and other series
Jack Sock	1992		Athlete	Tennis player
Ted Sorensen	1928	2010	Lawyer, speechwriter	Closest adviser to and speechwriter for President John F. Kennedy
Charles Starkweather	1938	1959	Criminal	Executed after killing spree in Nebraska and Wyoming that left 11 dead
Ryland Steen	1980		Musician	Drummer for ska punk band Reel Big Fish
Alex Stivrins	1962		Professional basketball player	Played for NBA's Seattle SuperSonics, Phoenix Suns, Los Angeles Clippers, Milwaukee Bucks, and Atlanta Hawks
Hilary Swank	1974		Actress	Won two Academy Awards for Best Actress for Boys Don't Cry and Million Dollar Baby
Matthew Sweet	1964		Musician	Solo pop rock artist, formerly member of R.E.M. and The B-52's
Brandon Teena	1972	1993	Trans icon	Murdered for being a transgender man; inspired the 1999 Oscar-winning film Boys Don't Cry
Janine Turner	1962		Actress	Starred in TV series Northern Exposure and film Cliffhanger
James Valentine	1978		Musician	Guitarist for pop rock band Maroon 5
Robert Van Pelt	1897	1988	Attorney	Served as U.S. District Judge in District of Nebraska
Kent Wells	1967		Athlete	NFL and AFL player
Daniel Whitney (Larry the Cable Guy)	1963		Comedian, actor	Co-star of Blue Collar Comedy Tour
Tony Wied	1976		Politician	U.S. representative for Wisconsin
Don Wilson	1900	1982	Announcer	Radio and TV announcer for Jack Benny
Mary Zimmerman	1960		Director and playwright	Winner of Broadway's Tony Award in 2002
Greg Zuerlein	1987		Pro football player	Placekicker for NFL's New York Jets

== See also ==
- Category:People from Lincoln, Nebraska
