= Charlie's Angels (franchise) =

American media franchise, started 1976

- Official logo of original television series.
- Created by: Ivan Goff; Ben Roberts
- Original work: Charlie's Angels (1976–1981)
- Owner: Sony Pictures Entertainment
- Years: 1976–present

Print publications
- Comics: Charlie's Angels (2018); Charlie's Angels vs. the Bionic Woman

Films and television
- Film(s): List of films
- Short film(s): Ru's Angels
- Television series: List of television series
- Web series: Charlie's Angels: Animated Adventures

Games
- Traditional: The Charlie's Angels Game
- Video game(s): List of video games

Audio
- Soundtrack(s): List of soundtracks
- Original music: List of songs

Charlie's Angels is an American media franchise created by Ivan Goff and Ben Roberts and owned by Sony Pictures Entertainment, which began with the original television series of the same name in 1976. The franchise follows the adventures of the Angels, a team of women working for the Townsend Agency, a private secret agent agency, under the leadership of Charlie Townsend, their unseen boss.

The original television series enjoyed huge popularity with audiences and was a top ten hit in the Nielsen ratings for its first two seasons. Following its cancellation in 1981, the series continues to have a 1970s American cult and pop culture following through syndication and DVD releases. A great variety of merchandise was produced based on the show, including dolls, a toy line, board games, beauty products, several sets of trading cards and a comic book series by Dynamite Entertainment.

In the early 2000s, a film series was launched with Charlie's Angels (2000) and Charlie's Angels: Full Throttle (2003). Taking place after the events of the original series, the films are a continuation of the story with later generations of Angels. The films received mixed reviews from critics and grossed a total of $596 million against a combined budget of $261 million.

The franchise was rebooted in 2011, with a television series of the same name, which was canceled after seven episodes. Following the cancellation, a third film was produced which restored the original timeline of the franchise.

== Television ==
Series	Season	Episodes	First released	Last released	Showrunner(s)	Network(s)
Charlie's Angels (1976)	5	115	September 22, 1976	June 24, 1981	Ivan Goff & Ben Roberts	ABC
Charlie's Angels (2011)	1	8	September 22, 2011	November 10, 2011	Miles Millar & Alfred Gough	ABC

=== Charlie's Angels (1976–1981) ===
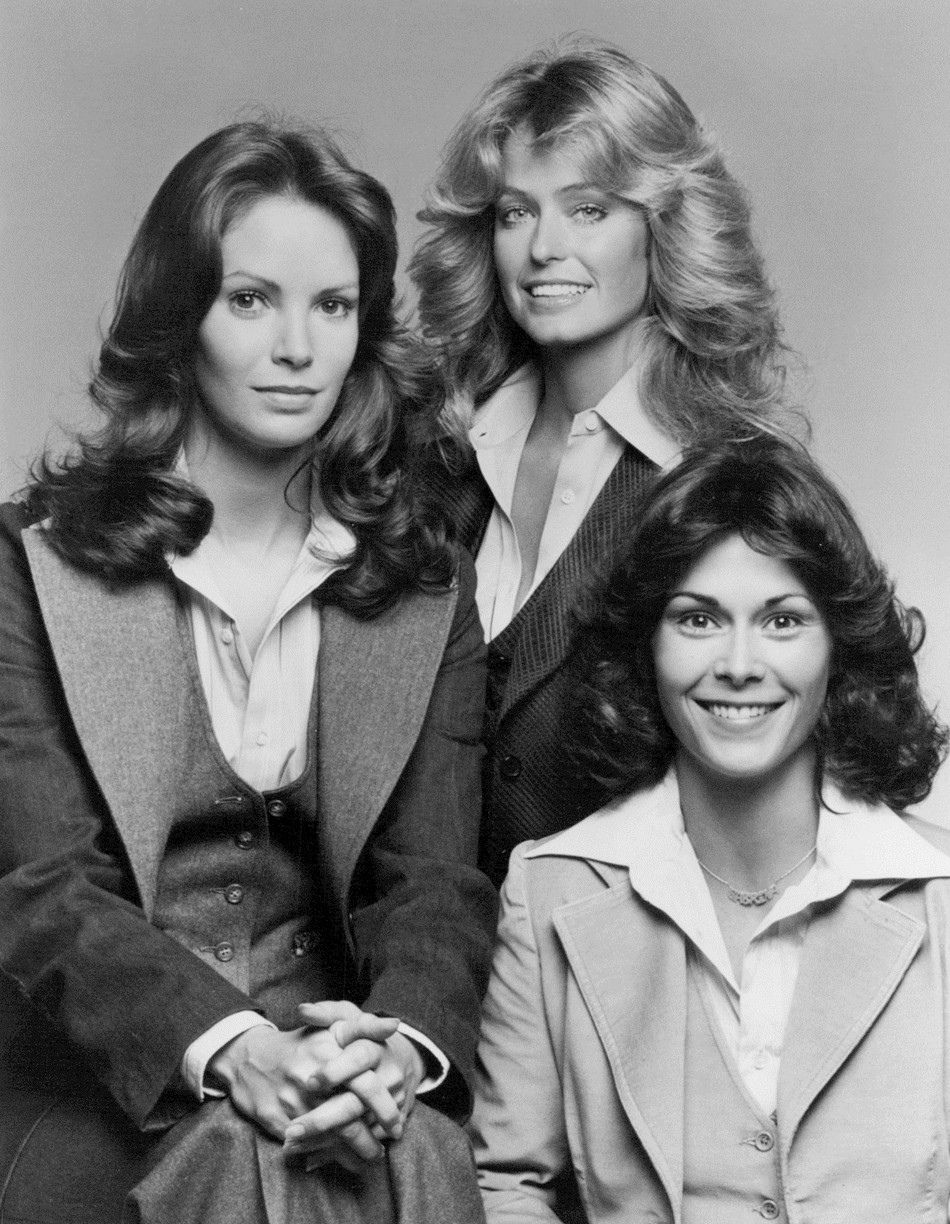
Season one cast (1976–1977): Jaclyn Smith, Farrah Fawcett, and Kate Jackson

Sabrina Duncan, Jill Munroe, and Kelly Garrett have graduated from the police academy in Los Angeles, California. Despite proving their capability during training, all three have subsequently been assigned to be a meter maid, office worker, and crossing guard, respectively. Dissatisfied with these jobs, they are recruited to work for the Charles Townsend Agency as private investigators. Their boss, Charlie Townsend, nicknames them "Angels". Subsequent Angels are Kris Munroe, Tiffany Welles, and Julie Rogers.

Charlie is never viewed full-face. Charlie gives the Angels and his associate John Bosley their assignments via a speakerphone; he never met them face-to-face.

=== Charlie's Angels (2011) ===
Kate Prince, a former Miami cop; Eve French, a former street racer; and Abby Simpson, a former thief; are recruited to work for the Townsend Agency in Miami as private investigators. Aided by John Bosley, a former hacker, they fight crime under the leadership of Charlie Townsend, their unseen boss.

The series served as a reboot of the franchise and was cancelled after only one season with seven episodes.

=== Upcoming television series ===
On May 9, 2024, a new television series oriented towards tweens and set in Brazil was announced to be in the works at Sony Pictures Television Kids and Floresta with Suzana Pires attached to write.

== Crossover ==
Note: The table below only accounts for full crossover events, single guest appearances are not included.

=== With other series ===
Crossover between		Episode	Type	Actors crossing over	Date aired
Series A	Series B	Episode	Type	Actors crossing over	Date aired
Charlie's Angels (1976)	Vegas	"Angels in Vegas" (Parts 1 & 2) (Charlie's Angels 3.01 & 3.02)	Guest appearance	Appearing in Series A: Robert Urich	September 13, 1978
When violent and suspicious deaths strike his closest friends, a casino boss hires the Angels to go undercover at the Tropicana Casino in Las Vegas. The Angels must discover the culprit behind the series of mysterious murders before it's too late. The character Dan Tanna (played by Robert Urich) from the detective series Vegas appeared in the episode "Angels in Vegas" a week before the Vegas season one debut. The crossover was simply used to reintroduce the Dan Tanna character and to promote Vegas as an ongoing series.
Charlie's Angels (1976)	The Love Boat	"Love Boat Angels" (Parts 1 & 2) (Charlie's Angels 4.01 & 4.02)	Guest appearance	Appearing in Series A: Gavin MacLeod, Bernie Kopell, Fred Grandy, Ted Lange & Lauren Tewes	September 12, 1979
Tiffany Welles joins the Townsend Agency after Sabrina Duncan has quit to get married and start a family. Charlie tells his girls to take a cruise on the Pacific Princess to catch art thief Paul Hollister. Kris offers to get close to their target, but soon begins to feel an attraction to him. The characters of the series The Love Boat are guest starred in a two-hour season premiere of season 4. It is also the debut appearance of Shelley Hack as Tiffany Welles.

== Films ==
Launched in 2000, the Charlie's Angels film series is a continuation of the original television series story.

Film	U.S. release date	Director(s)	Screenwriter(s)	Story by	Producer(s)
Charlie's Angels (2000)	November 3, 2000	McG	Ryan Rowe, Ed Solomon & John August	Ryan Rowe, Ed Solomon & John August	Nancy Juvonen, Drew Barrymore & Leonard Goldberg
Charlie's Angels: Full Throttle	June 27, 2003	McG	John August, Cormac & Marianne Wibberley	John August	Nancy Juvonen, Drew Barrymore & Leonard Goldberg
Charlie's Angels (2019)	November 15, 2019	Elizabeth Banks	Elizabeth Banks	David Auburn & Evan Spiliotopoulos	Doug Belgrad, Max Handelman, Elizabeth Banks & Elizabeth Cantillon

=== Charlie's Angels (2000) ===
Natalie Cook, Dylan Sanders and Alex Munday are the second generation of "Angels", a crime-fighting trio who are the masters of disguise, espionage and martial arts. Charlie assigns them to find Eric Knox, a software genius who created a revolutionary voice-recognition system and heads his own company, Knox Enterprises. Knox is believed to have been kidnapped by Roger Corwin, who runs a communications-satellite company called Redstar. The "Angels", aided by Bosley, set out to bring down the bad guys.

=== Charlie's Angels: Full Throttle (2003) ===
Natalie, Dylan and Alex, together with Bosley's adoptive brother Jimmy Bosley, are sent to recover H.A.L.O. titanium rings stolen from the United States Department of Justice which can display the people listed in the witness protection program. During this adventure, they will cross paths with former Angel Madison Lee.

=== Charlie's Angels (2019) ===
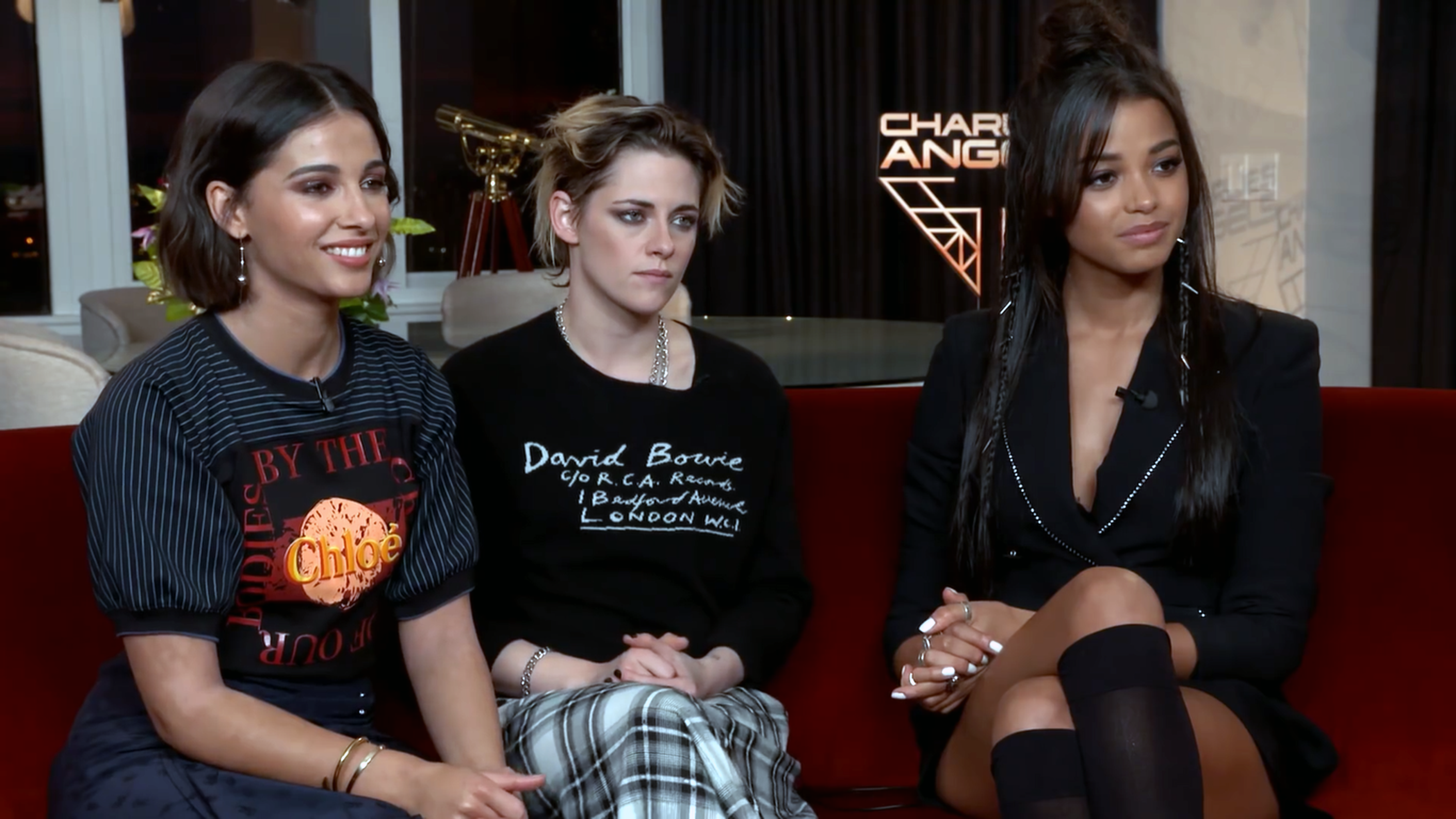
Naomi Scott, Kristen Stewart and Ella Balinska, the third generation of Angels.

The Townsend agency has expanded internationally with multiple teams of Angels guided by multiple Bosleys, a rank named after John. The European division of the agency is informed that Elena Houghlin, an engineer, wants to expose her superiors for covering up a discovery about how an energy conservation device that she helped invent, named Calisto, has the potential to trigger fatal seizures when used. A new team of Angels are called into action to protect the world from Calisto.

=== Future ===
In February 2026, it was announced that a new reboot was in the works, with the screenplay being done by Pete Chiarelli.

== Short film ==
=== Ru's Angels (2019) ===
A three minute short action comedy film titled Ru's Angels, follows three drag queens Alaska, Peppermint and Nina West from RuPaul's Drag Race, who are about to stop a wig snatcher played by Katya. The short film also stars RuPaul as Bos-Slay and the cast of the 2019 Charlie's Angels film.

== Web series ==
Series	Season	Episodes	First released	Last released	Showrunner(s)	Network(s)
Charlie's Angels: Animated Adventures	1	6	May 13, 2003	June 17, 2003	Stephanie Savage	AnimatedAngels.com

=== Charlie's Angels: Animated Adventures (2003) ===
Charlie's Angels: Animated Adventures is an animated prequel web series consisting of six episodes. The series follows the Angels on a mission to find U.S. Marshal Ray Carter. Carter was kidnapped, and taken to and incarcerated in Mongolia, leading to the events of Charlie's Angels: Full Throttle.

== Cast and crew ==
=== Principal cast ===
Key
- An ^{A} indicates an appearance through archival footage or audio.
- A ^{C} indicates a cameo appearance.
- A ^{P} indicates the actor appeared as their character through a photographic still.
- A ^{U} indicates an uncredited appearance.
- A ^{V} indicates the actor or actress lent only their voice for their film character.
- A ^{Y} indicates the actor portrayed the role of a younger version of the character.
- A dark gray cell indicates the character was not in the film.

Characters	Original television series	Film series			Web series	Video game	Reboot television series
Characters	Charlie's Angels	Charlie's Angels	Charlie's Angels: Full Throttle	Charlie's Angels	Charlie's Angels: Animated Adventures	Charlie's Angels	Charlie's Angels
Characters	1976–1981	2000	2003	2019	2003	2003	2011
The Angels
Sabrina Duncan	Kate Jackson	Kate Jackson^{P}		Kate Jackson^{P}			
Jill Munroe	Farrah Fawcett			Farrah Fawcett^{P}			
Kelly Garrett	Jaclyn Smith Tonya Crowe^{U}^{Y}	Jaclyn Smith^{P}	Jaclyn Smith^{U}^{C}	Jaclyn Smith^{C}			
Kris Munroe	Cheryl Ladd Jordan Ladd^{U}^{Y}			Cheryl Ladd^{P}			
Tiffany Welles	Shelley Hack						
Julie Rogers	Tanya Roberts	Tanya Roberts^{P}					
Natalie Cook		Cameron Diaz	Cameron Diaz	Cameron Diaz^{P}	Appeared	Cameron Diaz^{V}	
Dylan Sanders Helen Zaas		Drew Barrymore	Drew Barrymore	Drew Barrymore^{P}	Appeared	Drew Barrymore^{V}	
Alexandra "Alex" Munday		Lucy Liu	Lucy Liu	Lucy Liu^{P}	Appeared	Lucy Liu^{V}	
Sabina Wilson				Kristen Stewart			
Elena Houghlin				Naomi Scott			
Jane Kano				Ella Balinska			
Ingrid				Hannah Hoekstra			
Angels				Hailee Steinfeld^{C}			
Angels				Lili Reinhart^{C}			
Angels				Aly Raisman^{C}			
Angels				Chloe Kim^{C}			
Angels				Huda Kattan^{C}			
Fight Instructor				Ronda Rousey^{C}			
Driving Instructor				Danica Patrick^{C}			
Bomb Instructor				Laverne Cox^{C}			
Kate Prince							Annie Ilonzeh
Abigail "Abby" Simpson							Rachael Taylor
Eve French							Minka Kelly Taylor Blackwell^{Y}
Gloria Martinez							Nadine Velazquez Anahi Artica^{Y}
Townsend Agency
Charles "Charlie" Townsend	John Forsythe^{V}	John Forsythe^{V}	John Forsythe^{V}	Robert Clotworthy^{V}	John Forsythe^{U}^{V}	Allan Wenger^{V}	Victor Garber^{U}^{V}
John Bosley	David Doyle	Bill Murray	Bill Murray^{P}	Patrick Stewart David Doyle^{P} Bill Murray^{P}			Ramon Rodriguez
Jimmy Bosley			Bernie Mac			Thomas M. Pollard^{V}	
Rebekah "Bosley"				Elizabeth Banks			
Edgar "Bosley" Dessange				Djimon Hounsou			
The Saint				Luis Gerardo Méndez			
New York Bosley				Michael Strahan^{C}			
Other cast and characters
Thin Man / Anthony		Crispin Glover	Crispin Glover Zack Shada^{Y}			Appeared	
Jason Gibbons		Matt LeBlanc	Matt LeBlanc				
Peter Kominsky		Luke Wilson	Luke Wilson				
Eric Knox John McAdam		Sam Rockwell					
Roger Corwin		Tim Curry					
Vivian Wood		Kelly Lynch					
Madison Lee			Demi Moore				
Seamus O'Grad			Justin Theroux				
Marshal Ray Carter			Robert Patrick		Appeared		
Alexander Brok				Sam Claflin			
Langston				Noah Centineo			
Hodak				Jonathan Tucker			
Victor Simpson							John Terry
Ray Goodson							Isaiah Mustafa

=== Additional crew ===
Film	Crew/Detail						
Film	Composer(s)	Cinematographer	Editor(s)	Executive producer(s)	Production companies	Distributing companies	Running time
Charlie's Angels (2000)	Edward Shearmur	Russell Carpenter	Wayne Wahrman; Peter Teschner	Betty Thomas; Jenno Topping; Joseph M. Caracciolo	Flower Films (II); Columbia Pictures; Tall Trees Productions; Leonard Goldberg Productions	Columbia Pictures	98 minutes
Charlie's Angels: Full Throttle	Edward Shearmur	Russell Carpenter	Wayne Wahrman	Jenno Topping; Patrick Crowley	Flower Films (II); Columbia Pictures; Tall Trees Productions; Wonderland Sound and Vision; Leonard Goldberg Productions	Columbia Pictures	106 minutes
Charlie's Angels (2019)	Brian Tyler	Bill Pope	Mary Jo Markey; Alan Baumgarten	Nancy Juvonen; Matthew Hirsch; Drew Barrymore; Leonard Goldberg	2.0 Entertainment; Columbia Pictures; Cantillon Company; Perfect World Pictures; Brownstone Productions (II)	Sony Pictures Releasing	119 minutes

== Reception ==
=== Box office performance ===
Film	U.S. release date	Box office gross			Budget	Ref.
Film	U.S. release date	North America	Other territories	Worldwide	Budget	Ref.
Charlie's Angels (2000)	November 3, 2000	$125,305,545	$138,800,000	$264,105,545	$93 million	
Charlie's Angels: Full Throttle	June 27, 2003	$100,830,111	$158,345,677	$259,175,788	$120 million	
Charlie's Angels (2019)	November 15, 2019	$17,803,077	$55,476,811	$73,279,888	$48–55 million	
Total		$243,938,733	$352,622,488	$596,561,221	$261–268 million	

=== Critical and public response ===
Film	Rotten Tomatoes	Metacritic	CinemaScore
Charlie's Angels (2000)	68% (146 reviews)	52 (34 reviews)	A−
Charlie's Angels: Full Throttle	41% (186 reviews)	48 (39 reviews)	B+
Charlie's Angels (2019)	52% (224 reviews)	52 (41 reviews)	B+

== Music ==
=== Soundtracks ===
Title	U.S. release date	Performed by	Length	Label
Charlie's Angels: Music from the Motion Picture (2000)	October 24, 2000	Various Artists	58:22	Columbia; Sony Music Soundtrax
Charlie's Angels: Full Throttle (Music from the Motion Picture)	June 24, 2003	Various Artists	49:57	Columbia; Sony Music Soundtrax
Charlie's Angels: Original Motion Picture Soundtrack (2019)	November 1, 2019	Various Artists	36:37	Republic
Charlie's Angels: Original Motion Picture Score (2019)	November 8, 2019	Brian Tyler	1:13:56	Sony Classical

=== Singles ===
Title	U.S. release date	Length	Artist(s)	Label	Film
"Independent Women"	August 29, 2000	3:37	Destiny's Child	Columbia	Charlie's Angels (2000)
"Angel's Eye"	2000	3:22	Aerosmith	Columbia	Charlie's Angels (2000)
"Charlie's Angels 2000"	November 27, 2000	3:54	Apollo 440	Columbia	Charlie's Angels (2000)
"Feel Good Time"	May 27, 2003	3:56	Pink featuring William Orbit	Columbia	Charlie's Angels: Full Throttle
"Don't Call Me Angel"	September 13, 2019	3:10	Ariana Grande, Miley Cyrus and Lana Del Rey	Republic	Charlie's Angels (2019)
"How It's Done"	October 11, 2019	3:02	Kash Doll, Kim Petras, Alma and Stefflon Don	Republic	Charlie's Angels (2019)
"Pantera"	October 23, 2019	2:04	Anitta	Republic	Charlie's Angels (2019)
"Bad to You"	November 1, 2019	2:52	Ariana Grande, Normani and Nicki Minaj	Republic	Charlie's Angels (2019)
"Charlie's Angels Theme"	November 1, 2019	2:19	Brian Tyler	Sony Classical	Charlie's Angels (2019)

== Other media and merchandising ==
=== Collectible items ===
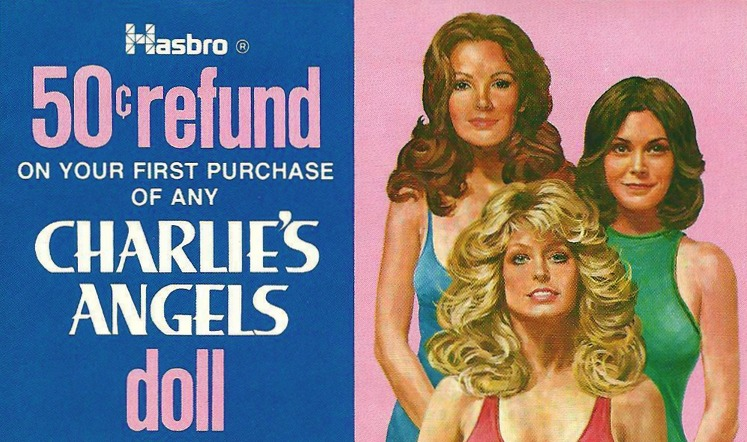
A coupon for the Charlie's Angels dolls by Hasbro.

During the original series' run, Hasbro Industries produced an extensive range of Charlie's Angels merchandise, which was distributed in the US, the UK, and other international markets. A numerous variety of collectible items were produced, including two versions of dolls, boardgames, numerous posters, several sets of trading cards, notebooks, a lunchbox and thermos set, a Charlie's Angels toy van, children's beauty products and even record albums. Author Sherrie A. Inness, in the text 'Disco Divas: Women and Popular Culture in the 1970s' writes that "Charlie's Angels merchandise was big business, Hasbro Industries spent over $2.5 million to advertise its Charlie's Angels dolls".

In the UK, as was common with many popular US programs of the era, a series of tie-in hardcover annuals were published by World International Publishing Ltd, containing stories, comics, photos, puzzles and features on the stars. There are four Charlie's Angels annuals in total.

Although it was not connected to the show, a 1976 poster of Farrah Fawcett sporting a red bathing suit became the biggest selling poster in history with more than 12 million copies sold. This poster also helped the burgeoning popularity of the series. The red swimsuit that helped make Farrah Fawcett a 1970s icon became part of the Smithsonian's collection in 2011. The picture has been immortalized as a Black Label Barbie Collection doll and the legendary red bathing suit has been donated to the Smithsonian Institution in Washington, D.C. The designer of that swimsuit is Norma Kamali.

=== Video games ===
In July 2003, Charlie's Angels was released for GameCube and PlayStation 2. Charlie's Angels: Road Cyclone was published for mobile phones. An online video game. Charlie's Angels: Angel X, was also released in May 2003 by Sony Pictures Digital Networks. The three games are based on the first and second films in the series.

In April 2008, Ojom announced a new Charlie's Angels mobile phone game entitled Charlie's Angels: Hellfire. The game was available on operator portals across Europe.

In August 2019, a game named Charlie's Angels: The Game was released on iOS and Android devices by Crazy Labs Games. The game is an endless runner based on the third film in the series.

=== Comic books ===
Two British comic strip versions were produced. The first appeared in the Polystyle publication Target in April 1978, drawn by John Canning. Target was a sister title to the long-running TV Comic aimed at older children and featuring TV action and crime shows of the day. Proving unpopular, it folded in August and merged back into TV Comic where Canning's Angels strip continued until October 1979. The second strip was printed in Junior TV Times Look-in, debuting in November 1979 (as soon as Polystyle's deal expired), written by Angus Allan and drawn by Jim Baikie and Bill Titcombe.

In June 2018, a six-issue limited comic book series based on the television series was launched by Dynamite Entertainment. A crossover comic book series with Charlie's Angels and The Bionic Woman titled Charlie's Angels vs. the Bionic Woman, was released on July 3, 2019.

== Cancelled projects ==
=== Angels '88 ===
Four women (including future star Tea Leoni) were selected to be in a show called Angels '88, which was to serve as an updated version of the show. The show was later named Angels '89, but after production delays and a writers' strike, the project was abandoned before notice was taken. The primary difference of Charlie's Angels and Angels '88 is the concept of Angels '88 being about four actresses who decide to open their own detective agency after their television show, in which they played private detectives, was cancelled.

=== Toni's Boys ===
ABC attempted to create a spin-off of Charlie's Angels in 1980 called Toni's Boys. The backdoor pilot aired near the end of season four, simply titled "Toni's Boys" (season 4, episode 23). The episode stars Barbara Stanwyck as Antonia "Toni" Blake, a wealthy widow socialite and friend of Charlie's who runs a detective agency she inherited from her late husband. The agency is staffed by three handsome male detectives; Cotton Harper (Stephen Shortridge), Bob Sorensen (Bob Seagren), and Matt Parrish (Bruce Bauer). They take direction from Toni, and solve crimes in a manner similar to the Angels. The show was not picked up as a regular series for the following season.

=== Film sequels ===
Following the release of Charlie's Angels: Full Throttle, the franchise was confirmed for a third and fourth film, but in 2004, the idea was cancelled. Following the release of the 2019 film, a sequel was discussed, but due to the film's box office performance, was scrapped.
