= Charlie's Angels (2019 film) =

2019 film by Elizabeth Banks

- Theatrical release poster
- Directed by: Elizabeth Banks
- Screenplay by: Elizabeth Banks
- Story by: Evan Spiliotopoulos; David Auburn
- Based on: Charlie's Angels by: Ivan Goff; Ben Roberts
- Produced by: Doug Belgrad; Elizabeth Cantillon; Elizabeth Banks
- Starring: Kristen Stewart; Naomi Scott; Ella Balinska; Elizabeth Banks; Djimon Hounsou; Sam Claflin; Noah Centineo; Patrick Stewart
- Cinematography: Bill Pope
- Edited by: Alan Baumgarten
- Music by: Brian Tyler
- Production companies: Columbia Pictures; 2.0 Entertainment; Brownstone Productions; Cantillon Company
- Distributed by: Sony Pictures Releasing
- Release date: November 15, 2019
- Running time: 118 minutes
- Country: United States
- Language: English
- Budget: $48–55 million
- Box office: $73.3 million

Charlie's Angels is a 2019 American action comedy film written and directed by Elizabeth Banks from a story by Evan Spiliotopoulos and David Auburn. It stars Kristen Stewart, Naomi Scott, and Ella Balinska as the new generation of Angels who are working for a private detective agency named the Townsend Agency. The film is the third installment in the Charlie's Angels film series and serves as a standalone sequel and a continuation of the story that began with the television series of the same name by Ivan Goff and Ben Roberts, and the two previous theatrical films, Charlie's Angels (2000) and Charlie's Angels: Full Throttle (2003).

Development of the film began in September 2015 when Sony Pictures opted to reboot the series following the cancellation of the 2011 television reboot and the release of 2003's Full Throttle. Months later, Banks joined the project as director, producer, and writer. Casting announcements were made throughout 2018, with Banks herself also confirmed to star. Principal photography commenced in September 2018 and took place in Germany and Turkey. The lead single from the film's soundtrack, "Don't Call Me Angel", performed by Ariana Grande, Miley Cyrus, and Lana Del Rey, was released in September 2019, followed by the soundtrack and score album's respective releases on November 1 and 8.

Charlie's Angels was theatrically released in the United States on November 15, 2019, by Sony Pictures Releasing through its Columbia Pictures label to mixed reviews from critics and a poor opening weekend box office performance. It was ranked by both USA Today and Variety as one of the biggest box-office disappointments of 2019. The film eventually grossed $73.3 million worldwide against an estimated production budget of $48–55 million and an estimated advertising budget of $50 million.

== Plot ==
A team of Angels including Jane and Sabina, led by senior operative John Bosley, capture international embezzler Jonny Smith in Rio de Janeiro and turn him over to American authorities.

A year later, the European division of the Townsend Agency is informed that Elena Houghlin, an engineer and programmer employed by entrepreneur Alexander Brok, wants to expose her superiors. She knows that Brok's head of development, Peter Fleming, is covering up a flaw in an energy conservation device that she helped invent, Calisto. It has the potential to trigger fatal seizures when used.

Elena meets with operative Edgar "Bosley" in Hamburg to turn over her findings, but the assassin Hodak ambushes the meeting. After a subsequent car chase in which Edgar is shot dead before the car is flipped into the river, the assassin leaves Elena to drown. Edgar's protégé, Jane Kano, is also in the car. She rescues her and brings her to operative Rebekah "Bosley" with the help of her partner, Sabina Wilson. Meanwhile, John, who has since retired from the agency, discovers that Rebekah has tagged him with the agency's specialized subdermal implant tracking device without his knowledge.

Rebekah tasks Sabina and Jane, joined by Elena, with breaking into Brok's corporate headquarters to steal the remaining Calisto prototypes before they can be duplicated. Elena finds one but is forced to use it to escape, accidentally killing the chief of security Ralph in the process.

After learning that Fleming took the other prototypes, Rebekah tracks him to Istanbul, where Jane uses one of her old intelligence contacts Fatima to locate him. They first seek him at a horse racetrack, where he doesn't seem to find a buyer.

Later, they track him to a remote rock quarry, where the supposedly imprisoned Smith is revealed to be Fleming's intermediary for selling Calisto. Hodak is also present and kills Fleming before the Angels break up the sale. Rebekah suddenly disappears, allowing Smith and Hodak to escape with the prototypes.

Returning to their safehouse, Sabina shares her growing belief that Rebekah is secretly working against the agency and manipulating them to steal Calisto for her own benefit. While the three ponder Sabina's suspicion, the safehouse is bombed. Rebekah shows up only to be shot by John, who has come to "rescue" Elena.

Sabina and Jane manage to survive and seek medical help from Fatima. Rebekah reappears and explains that John is the real traitor and that he has spent the last few decades secretly building his own network within the agency after he was passed over to succeed the late Charlie Townsend.

John takes Elena to a party in Chamonix hosted by Brok, who reveals himself as the mastermind behind the attempt to assassinate Elena and, unbeknownst to him, John's plan to weaponize Calisto. Using Elena's colleague Langston as a hostage, John forces her to program a Calisto device to kill both herself and Langston before leaving.

The Angels deduced his plan due to the information provided by Smith, who has defected to their side. So, they show up and rescue Elena and Langston, although she had already disabled the Calisto device. Jane exacts revenge by impaling Hodak on a spike, while Rebekah catches up with John and his men. Outnumbered, she has numerous other Angels posing as guests subdue the men, after which Sabina knocks out John with a punch.

Brok is arrested for conspiracy, and Jane and Langston start a relationship. Elena is finally recruited as an Angel by the Townsend Agency after passing a series of rigorous training exercises. In a mid-credits scene, she receives an official Angels tattoo and congratulations from former Angel Kelly Garrett, who has become the new "Charlie".

== Cast ==
- Kristen Stewart as Sabina Wilson, a wild and rebellious Angel
- Naomi Scott as Elena Houghlin, an engineer, programmer, and creator of the Calisto project, who gets recruited to become an Angel
- Ella Balinska as Jane Kano, a former MI6 agent who became an Angel
- Elizabeth Banks as Rebekah "Bosley", a former Angel who became one of Charlie's assistants
- Djimon Hounsou as Edgar "Bosley" Dessange, one of Charlie's assistants
- Sam Claflin as Alexander Brok, Elena's employer
- Noah Centineo as Langston, Elena's assistant
- Nat Faxon as Peter Fleming, Elena's superior
- Patrick Stewart as John Bosley.
- Chris Pang as Jonny Smith, an international smuggler
- Jonathan Tucker as Hodak, an assassin
- Luis Gerardo Méndez as the Saint, a Townsend Agency employee specializing in weapons and technology
- David Schütter as Ralph, the chief of security at Brok's corporate
- Hannah Hoekstra as Ingrid, an Angel who works as a secretary at Brok's corporate
- Marie-Lou Sellem as Fatima Ahmed, Jane's contact in Istanbul
- Robert Clotworthy as the voice of Charles "Charlie" Townsend, the owner of the Townsend Agency. Clotworthy replaces John Forsythe, who voiced the character in the television series and previous film installments, following Forsythe's death in 2010.

Making cameo appearances in the film are Hailee Steinfeld, Lili Reinhart, Aly Raisman, Huda Kattan, and Chloe Kim as newly recruited Angels; Ronda Rousey, Danica Patrick, and Laverne Cox as the Angels' instructors; and Michael Strahan as the Townsend Agency's New York branch "Bosley". Jaclyn Smith also makes a cameo appearance as Kelly Garrett, reprising her character from the television series for her second appearance in the film series, after cameoing in the second theatrical film. Still photographs of Kate Jackson, Farrah Fawcett, Cheryl Ladd, Cameron Diaz, Drew Barrymore, and Lucy Liu as their respective characters from the television series and previous installments also appear on a screen in the Townsend Agency's Los Angeles office.

== Production ==
Official logo, as released by Sony Pictures

In September 2015, Sony Pictures Entertainment announced that it was rebooting the Charlie's Angels franchise, with Elizabeth Banks in talks to direct the film, as well as produce, with her Brownstone Productions partner Max Handelman. Evan Spiliotopoulos was hired to write the script for the reboot film. Banks was officially confirmed as the film's director the following year in April, and rewrote the screenplay, which had previously been rewritten by Jay Basu, along with earlier touch-ups by Craig Mazin and Semi Chellas. Banks received sole screenplay credit, with "story by" billing for Spiliotopoulos and David Auburn.

In July 2018, it was announced that Kristen Stewart, Naomi Scott and Ella Balinska would play the leading trio of the fighting team and that Banks would also appear as a Bosley, with the film featuring multiple characters by that name. Doug Belgrad also co-produced the film through his 2.0 Entertainment, along with Elizabeth Cantillon, Banks and Handelman. Patrick Stewart was cast as a second Bosley in September. That same month, Luis Gerardo Méndez and Jonathan Tucker joined the cast of the film, with Djimon Hounsou added as a third Bosley, while Bill Pope was announced as the film's cinematographer. Sam Claflin, Noah Centineo, Chris Pang and Nat Faxon later joined the cast in October 2018.

Principal photography on the film began on September 24, 2018. Filming took place at the Elbphilharmonie in Hamburg, Germany from October 2–7. Further filming took place at the Spice Bazaar, Veliefendi Race Course and Sultanahmet, all in Istanbul, Turkey in early December. Filming completed on December 9.

Initially developed as a reboot of the franchise, the film instead serves as a continuation of the events of the original TV series and the McG-directed films. Drew Barrymore, who had produced and starred in the previous film installments, executive produced the film. Producer of the original series and first two films Leonard Goldberg came on board as an executive producer as well.

== Music ==
Musician Brian Tyler composed the film's score, while singer Ariana Grande co-executive produced the soundtrack along with music producer Savan Kotecha and record executive Scooter Braun. Grande collaborated with fellow singers Miley Cyrus and Lana Del Rey on a song titled "Don't Call Me Angel", which was released as the lead single from the soundtrack on September 13, 2019. A promotional single, "How It's Done", by Kash Doll, Kim Petras, Alma and Stefflon Don, was released on October 11. A second promotional single, "Pantera", by Brazilian singer Anitta, was released on October 23. The soundtrack and score albums were released on November 1 and 8, respectively.

== Release ==
=== Theatrical ===
Charlie's Angels was released on November 15, 2019, by Columbia Pictures. Prior to this, Sony Pictures Releasing announced that the film would also be released in IMAX format in select theaters. The film was originally set for November 1 date, but was pushed back to avoid competition with Terminator: Dark Fate.

The first theatrical trailer for the film was released on June 27, followed by the second trailer on October 11. While Sony had originally intended to spend $100 million to promote the film, the company reduced the overall promotional cost to approximately $50 million in light of the film's underperformance during its opening weekend.

=== Home media ===
Charlie's Angels was released digitally on February 18, 2020, and on Blu-ray and DVD on March 10.

== Reception ==
=== Box office ===
Charlie's Angels grossed $17.8 million in the United States and Canada, and $55.5 million in other territories, for a worldwide total of $73.3 million.

In the United States and Canada, the film was released alongside Ford v Ferrari and The Good Liar, and was projected to gross $10–12 million from 3,452 theaters in its opening weekend. However, after making $3.1 million on its first day (including $900,000 from Thursday night previews), it went on to debut to just $8.4 million, finishing in third place below Ford v Ferrari and Midway. Following the film's poor opening weekend, Deadline Hollywood cited the film's mixed critical response and a lack of public interest in the franchise as reasons for the underperformance. The Hollywood Reporter also observed that the film specifically "failed to attract moviegoers over the age of 35", as well as "younger females—its target audience—in enough numbers". In response to the film's opening weekend underperformance, Banks stated that she was proud of the film regardless. The film fell 61% to $3.2 million in its second weekend, finishing in eighth. USA Today and Variety ranked the film as one of the biggest box office failures of 2019.

=== Critical response ===
On Rotten Tomatoes, the film has an approval rating of 52% with an average score of 5.3/10, based on 237 reviews. The website's critics consensus reads: "Earnest and energetic, if a bit uneven, Elizabeth Banks's pulpy Charlie's Angels adds new flair to the franchise with fun performances from its three leads". On Metacritic, the film has a weighted average score of 52 out of 100, based on 41 critics, indicating "mixed or average" reviews. Audiences polled by CinemaScore gave the film an average grade of "B+" on an A+ to F scale, while those surveyed by PostTrak gave it an overall positive score of 69% (including an average 3 out of 5 stars), with 46% saying they would definitely recommend it.

Beandrea July of The Hollywood Reporter commended how the film "honors its precursors while elevating itself beyond them", while Sandra Hall of The Sydney Morning Herald opined that the film exudes a "jaunty feel" as well as incorporates "a few well-placed plot twists, lots of good-humored banter and the usual fun to be had from the Angels' fondness for disguise". Owen Gleiberman of Variety praised Elizabeth Banks' direction as a source of the film's strength, stating that she "proves herself to be a filmmaker who can stage fireworks with extreme flair". Writing for The Boston Globe, Tom Russo favorably regarded Kristen Stewart's performance as "a completely unexpected, who-knew mash-up of sexy and offbeat". Likewise, Mark Lieberman of The Washington Post wrote that Stewart "upstages everyone, from the opening close-up on her gleeful grin to her array of colorful costumes, riotous non sequiturs and unconventional posture choices".

In a mixed review, Peter Travers of Rolling Stone was critical of the film's pacing and comedic dialogue, but highlighted Stewart, Naomi Scott and Ella Balinska as "the angels you need when a movie needs rescuing". Similarly, Michael Phillips of the Chicago Tribune commented that the film's characters "have their fun, and we have a reasonable percentage of theirs," while the New York Post's Johnny Oleksinski noted conversely that the three actresses "click as a unit, but lack much of the exuberance and distinctiveness of their predecessors". Stephanie Zacharek of Time negatively regarded the film as "a shaggy, listless action movie that's too messy to be fun," the Los Angeles Times' Kenneth Turan deemed the plot "overly complicated", The Detroit News's Adam Graham criticized the film as "out-of-style," and in an even more scathing review, BBC Online columnist Nicholas Barber called it "grimly unimaginative" and "tediously formulaic".

Banks — who wrote, directed and co-starred in the movie — was critical of how the film was marketed:

"I'll just be in trouble. Let me say I'm proud of the movie. I loved Kristen Stewart being funny and light. I loved introducing Ella Balinska to the world. I loved working with Patrick Stewart. It was an incredible experience. It was very stressful, partly because when women do things in Hollywood it becomes this story. There was a story around Charlie's Angels that I was creating some feminist manifesto. I was just making an action movie. I would've liked to have made Mission: Impossible, but women aren't directing Mission: Impossible. I was able to direct an action movie, frankly, because it starred women and I'm a female director, and that is the confine right now in Hollywood. I wish that the movie had not been presented as just for girls, because I didn’t make it just for girls. There was a disconnect on the marketing side of it for me."

Additionally, Banks, who previously portrayed Betty Brant in Sam Raimi's Spider-Man trilogy, compared the box office failure to the popularity of the various Spider-Man films that were releasing at the time stating: "You've had 37 Spider-Man movies and you're not complaining!. "I think women are allowed to have one or two action franchises every 17 years —I feel totally fine with that.

In a 2024 interview, Kristen Stewart stated she "hated making" Charlie's Angels, contrasting it with the 2000 film, which she "loved". In 2026, original series star Jaclyn Smith revealed that she felt the movie failed because Elizabeth Banks "tried to really do a departure, and it didn’t work because what I find is if people love something, they don’t want it to change that much,” Smith says. “They want the original idea. But this had several Bosleys. The girls didn’t get along. Our whole essence was, we were a sisterhood, a fellowship. We had each other. It was loyalty before romance. We used our sex appeal to help us, and yet it still had a strong feminist backbone. I think it changed women’s roles on television."

=== Accolades ===
Award	Date of ceremony	Category	Recipient(s)	Result	Ref.
Alliance of Women Film Journalists	January 10, 2020	Actress Most in Need of a New Agent	Kristen Stewart (also for Seberg)	Nominated	
Alliance of Women Film Journalists	January 10, 2020	Sequel or Remake That Shouldn't Have Been Made	Charlie's Angels	Won	
Hollywood Music in Media Awards	November 20, 2019	Best Soundtrack Album	Charlie's Angels: Original Motion Picture Soundtrack	Nominated	
National Film Awards UK	March 20, 2020	Best Actress	Ella Balinska	Nominated	
Satellite Awards	December 19, 2019	Best Original Song	"Don't Call Me Angel"	Nominated	
