= Charlie's Angels (2000 film) =

2000 American film by McG

- Theatrical release poster
- Directed by: McG
- Written by: Ryan Rowe; Ed Solomon; John August
- Based on: Charlie's Angels by: Ivan Goff; Ben Roberts
- Produced by: Drew Barrymore; Leonard Goldberg; Nancy Juvonen
- Starring: Cameron Diaz; Drew Barrymore; Lucy Liu; Bill Murray; Sam Rockwell; Tim Curry; Kelly Lynch
- Cinematography: Russell Carpenter
- Edited by: Wayne Wahrman; Peter Teschner
- Music by: Edward Shearmur
- Production companies: Columbia Pictures; Leonard Goldberg Productions; Flower Films; Tall Trees Productions
- Distributed by: Sony Pictures Releasing
- Release dates: October 22, 2000 (Mann's Chinese Theatre); November 3, 2000 (United States)
- Running time: 98 minutes
- Country: United States
- Language: English
- Budget: $93 million
- Box office: $264.1 million

Charlie's Angels is a 2000 American spy action comedy film directed by McG in his feature-film directorial debut, and written by Ryan Rowe, Ed Solomon, and John August. It is the first installment in the Charlie's Angels film series, a continuation of the television series of the same name created by Ivan Goff and Ben Roberts. Unlike the original series, the film features more comic elements.

The film stars Cameron Diaz, Drew Barrymore, and Lucy Liu as three women working in a private detective agency in Los Angeles. John Forsythe reprised his role as the unseen Charlie's voice from the original series. Bill Murray also stars as John Bosley, replacing David Doyle, who played the role in the original series. It also stars Sam Rockwell, Tim Curry, and Kelly Lynch, while Crispin Glover, Matt LeBlanc, Luke Wilson, and Tom Green appear in supporting roles.

The film was released on November 3, 2000, in the United States by Sony Pictures Releasing under its Columbia Pictures label, and grossed $264.1 million worldwide. The film received mixed reviews from critics.

== Plot ==
Natalie Cook, Dylan Sanders, and Alex Munday are the current "Angels", three women who work as private investigators together for unseen millionaire Charlie Townsend. Charlie uses speakers in his offices to communicate with the Angels, and his assistant Bosley works with them directly when needed.

Charlie assigns the Angels to find Eric Knox, a software genius who created a revolutionary voice-recognition system and heads his own company, Knox Enterprises. He is believed to have been kidnapped by Roger Corwin, who runs the communications-satellite company Redstar.

The Angels infiltrate a party held by Corwin, spotting a suspicious-looking man that they had previously seen from surveillance videos of Knox's kidnapping. Dubbing him the "Thin Man", the Angels chase him down and fight him. He gets away, but the Angels find Knox, safely tied up nearby.

After the Angels reunite Knox with his business partner Vivian Wood, Charlie explains that they must determine whether the Thin Man has stolen Knox's voice-recognition software. The Angels infiltrate Redstar headquarters, fool the security system, and plant a device in the central computer to enable them to explore it remotely. They retire for the night after giving Bosley the laptop computer that communicates with the Redstar computer.

Dylan takes up Knox's offer to spend the night with him, and they end up having sex. Afterwards, he betrays her; simultaneously, attacks are made on Natalie and Alex, Bosley is captured by Vivian, and Corwin is murdered by the Thin Man. Knox tells Dylan his kidnapping was a setup to get the Angels to help him access the Redstar satellite network. He plans to use it along with his voice-recognition software to find and kill Charlie, whom Knox believes to be responsible for his father's death in the Vietnam War.

Dylan escapes and reunites with Natalie and Alex, who also survived their attacks. They approach Charlie's office just as the building explodes. They find a radio receiver through which Bosley is able to communicate via a tooth-implanted radio transmitter.

Bosley provides enough information of where he is being held captive to allow Natalie to deduce his location, an abandoned lighthouse. With help from Dylan's friend Chad, the Angels stealthily approach by boat. Upon finding Knox, Dylan is captured by his henchmen, tied up, and gagged.

The Angels are too late to stop Knox from determining Charlie's location, though they rescue Bosley while Dylan fights off her captors. They come together to defeat Vivian, the Thin Man, and other assorted henchmen, but Knox blows up the lighthouse and flies off in an attack helicopter towards Charlie's house. Bosley helps the Angels board it, where Alex reprograms the missile to have it shoot backwards, blowing up the helicopter and killing Knox while the Angels land safely.

Seeing the opportunity to finally meet Charlie in person, the Angels enter the nearby beach house that Knox had targeted, but he has already left. He remotely congratulates them on a job well done through another speaker and treats Bosley and them to a vacation. Charlie also tells them that Knox's father was an undercover double agent; he was discovered and killed by the enemy, but not by him.

When Charlie speaks to the Angels by telephone on the beach, they ask if they could ever meet him in person. Dylan suspects she sees him nearby talking into a cell phone, but does not tell the group, opting to raise a toast to Charlie instead. Bosley playfully douses the Angels with his drink, and they chase him towards the ocean. From afar, a silhouetted Charlie watches them and walks off.

== Cast ==
One of the most widely reproduced publicity images from Charlie's Angels features (L to R) Lucy Liu, Cameron Diaz, and Drew Barrymore in defensive posture as they prepare to subdue the Thin Man.

- Cameron Diaz as Natalie Cook
- Drew Barrymore as Dylan Sanders
- Lucy Liu as Alex Munday
- Bill Murray as John Bosley
- Sam Rockwell as Eric Knox
- Kelly Lynch as Vivian Wood
- Crispin Glover as the Thin Man, a mysterious assassin
- Matt LeBlanc as Jason Gibbons, Alex's boyfriend
- Luke Wilson as Pete Kominsky, Natalie's love interest
- Tim Curry as Roger Corwin, head of communications-satellite company Redstar
- John Forsythe as the voice of Charles "Charlie" Townsend, the owner of the Townsend Agency
- Tom Green as Chad, a lovesick fisherman whom Dylan is dating
- LL Cool J as Mr. Jones, Dylan's secret identity in the first scene
- Melissa McCarthy as Doris, a secretary at Redstar
- Sean Whalen as Pasqual, a terrorist
- Karen McDougal as Roger Corwin's girlfriend

== Production ==
In June 1998, Charlie's Angels was reported to be one of a number of Aaron Spelling-produced television series in development for a feature-film adaptation. The following July, the project reportedly was being developed at Sony Pictures.

In February 1999, Drew Barrymore was set to star in and produce Charlie's Angels through her company Flower Films. In April of that year, Cameron Diaz was announced to have joined the film as a co-lead. By October, Thandiwe Newton was reportedly close to signing a deal as the third lead, but later that same month dropped out reportedly due to scheduling problems. She would eventually instead portray her role in Mission: Impossible 2. According to Newton, she was the original choice for Alex Munday, but declined as she did not want to be "objectified" or play racial stereotypes. The role ultimately went to Lucy Liu. McG would later say that Bill Murray headbutted him while filming. Murray would later deny this, calling it "bullshit".

Other actresses who were considered for the role of Alex include Jennifer Lopez, Angelina Jolie, and Salma Hayek. R&B singer and actress Aaliyah was also considered for the role of Alex, but was deemed too young at the time, while actress Nia Long, was deemed "too old" looking. The latter would eventually star in Big Momma's House instead.

== Reception ==
=== Box office ===
The film opened on November 3, 2000, earning $13.7 million in its opening day, debuting at the top of the box office. For its first weekend, the film grossed $40.1 million, dethroning Meet the Parents, which had stayed at number one for four weeks. Eventually, Charlie's Angels grossed a total of $125,305,545 domestically.

Against a budget of $93 million, Charlie's Angels grossed $125.3 million in North America and $148.8 million in other territories, for a worldwide gross of $264.1 million, making it the 12th-highest-grossing film of 2000.

=== Critical response ===
The film received mixed reviews from critics upon release. On the review aggregator website Rotten Tomatoes, 68% of 145 critics' reviews are positive. The website's consensus reads: "Mixing tongue-in-cheek cheesecake with glossy action set pieces, Charlie's Angels is slick and reasonably fun despite its lack of originality." Metacritic, which uses a weighted average, assigned the film a score of 52 out of 100, based on 34 critics, indicating "mixed or average" reviews. Audiences polled by CinemaScore gave the film an average grade of "A-" on an A+ to F scale.

David Edelstein for Slate, wrote, despite expecting to hate the film, he found he loved it, calling it "a charming, hyper-energetic, and wittily self-aware action comedy about gorgeous girls". Owen Gleiberman of Entertainment Weekly gave the film a B grade, with particular praise for Cameron Diaz's performance, saying "not just an Angel – that's a star". Peter Travers of Rolling Stone called the film a "guilty pleasure" and praised the wire work and fight choreography of Cheung-Yan Yuen. Travers was critical of the thin plot but said it is "the film's quirky sense of mischief, which sets it apart" from lesser television to film adaptations. Desson Howe of The Washington Post said "the gals are fab. And so's the movie". He expressed mild disappointment at the men, commenting that Murray is funnier than the role written for him, and that even though Tom Green "does his weirdest best" he is only mildly amusing. In Variety, Todd McCarthy wrote of Diaz' performance, "Rarely has a performer conveyed the impression of being so happy to be in a particular movie."

Roger Ebert of the Chicago Sun-Times called it "a movie without a brain. Charlie's Angels is like the trailer for a video game movie, lacking only the video game, and the movie" and gave it half a star out of a possible 4 stars. Manohla Dargis wrote: "Of course, it's terrible – but did it have to be this bad?" Mick LaSalle of the San Francisco Chronicle called it "an utter debacle" and said the film "makes the show look like the height of creativity, imagination and restraint". LaSalle blames director McG comparing the film to a trailer or music video. He was also critical of the deliberate decision to make the three women very similar, and says "the Angels' goofiness is a big disappointment, second only to the shocking ineptitude of McG".

=== Other responses ===
During the making of Blade II, Guillermo del Toro commented that while films like Charlie's Angels had helped to popularize the wire fu style of fighting choreography in Western films, they also served as a "nail in the coffin" and prompted many filmmakers to want to get back to more "hard-hitting" action. In his commentary: "The moment you see Cameron Diaz flying in the air, and you know that she is incapable of flying in the air and kicking five guys... you realize that it is done using wires. [...] I mean, Charlie's Angels was great, but it[s fighting style] was almost satirical".

One scene in the film attracted attention from birdwatching fans and ornithologists. In it, Natalie (Cameron Diaz) identifies the location of the kidnapped Bosley via the sound of a nearby birdsong, which she says is that of the pygmy nuthatch, and that the nuthatch only lives in Carmel, California. However, the nuthatch lives in many more places than just Carmel; the camera shows a Venezuelan troupial, a bird that is six times larger than a nuthatch and not native to California; and the birdsong heard in the audio track is that of a thick-billed fox sparrow. Journalist Forrest Wickman investigated the incident, and found that in the original script, Alex (Lucy Liu) correctly identified an ʻiʻiwi birdsong as native to Hawaii, but this had to be changed after shooting moved to locations closer to Hollywood. In an interview with McG, he said that the movie was already late and over-budget when the bird scene with Bosley was shot, so nearly any bird that could 'act' the scene and look presentable had to be taken, explaining the use of the troupial.

The opening sequence on the plane arguably was inspired by the British Bulldog Drummond movie Deadlier Than the Male (1967).

== Home media ==
Charlie's Angels was released on both VHS and DVD on March 27, 2001, and on Blu-ray on August 3, 2010. A two-disc Superbit Deluxe DVD release premiered on May 27, 2003, coinciding with the release of its successor Charlie's Angels: Full Throttle. It was then released on 4K Ultra HD Blu-ray on October 22, 2019.

== Soundtrack ==
Charlie's Angels is the soundtrack album from the film of the same name. The album was released on October 24, 2000, by Columbia Records, Hollywood Records and Sony Music Soundtrax.

Charlie's Angels

Soundtrack album by Various artists
- Released: October 24, 2000
- Length: 58:22
- Labels: Columbia; Hollywood; Sony Music Soundtrax

Charlie's Angels soundtracks chronology
Charlie's Angels (2000)	Charlie's Angels: Full Throttle (2003)

Singles from Charlie's Angels
- 1. "Independent Women Part I" Released: August 29, 2000; 2. "Angel's Eye" Released: 2000; 3. "Charlie's Angels 2000" Released: November 27, 2000

Professional ratings
Review scores
Source	Rating
AllMusic	2/5 stars

No.	Title	Writer(s)	Performed by	Length
1.	"Independent Women Part I"	Beyoncé Knowles; Cory Rooney; Samuel Barnes; Jean-Claude Olivier	Destiny's Child	3:37
2.	"Heaven Must Be Missing an Angel"	Freddie Perren; Keni St. Lewis	Tavares	3:32
3.	"You Make Me Feel Like Dancing"	Vini Poncia; Leo Sayer	Leo Sayer	3:41
4.	"True"	Gary Kemp	Spandau Ballet	5:33
5.	"Dot"	Knowles; Errol "Poppi" McCalla	Destiny's Child	3:50
6.	"Boom! Shake the Room"	Will Smith, Danny G, Ray Hayden, Lee Haggard, Keith Mayberry, Walter Morrison, Wayne Williams, Marshall Jones, Norman Napier, Andrew Noland	DJ Jazzy Jeff & The Fresh Prince	4:22
7.	"Angel's Eye"	Steven Tyler; Joe Perry; Marti Frederiksen; Taylor Rhodes	Aerosmith	3:22
8.	"Barracuda"	Ann Wilson; Nancy Wilson; Michael DeRosier; Roger Fisher	Heart	4:22
9.	"Turning Japanese"	David Fenton	The Vapors	3:41
10.	"Brandy (You're a Fine Girl)"	Elliot Lurie	Looking Glass	3:22
11.	"Got to Give It Up"	Marvin Gaye	Marvin Gaye	4:12
12.	"Ya Mama"	Norman Cook	Fatboy Slim	4:29
13.	"Groove Is in the Heart"	Dmitry Brill; Chung Dong-Hwa; Kierin Kirby; Herbie Hancock; Jonathan Davis	Deee-Lite	3:53
14.	"Charlie's Angels 2000"	Jack Elliott; Allyn Ferguson	Apollo 440	3:54
15.	"Tangerine Speedo"	Caviar and Dominguez	Caviar	3:41
Total length:				58:22

Other songs are not included in the soundtrack

- "All the Small Things" by Blink-182
- "Blind" by Korn
- "Live Wire" by Mötley Crüe
- "Wake Me Up Before You Go-Go" by Wham!
- "Money (That's What I Want)" by The Flying Lizards
- "I Love Rock 'n' Roll" by Joan Jett and the Blackhearts
- "Angel of the Morning" by Juice Newton
- "Undercover Angel" by Alan O'Day
- "Principles of Lust" by Enigma
- "Twiggy Twiggy" by Pizzicato Five
- "Sukiyaki" by Kyu Sakamoto
- "Zendeko Hachijo" by Zenshuji Zendeko
- "Smack My Bitch Up" by The Prodigy
- "Another Town" by Transister
- "The Power of Love" by Huey Lewis and the News
- "Belly" by Nomad
- "When Angels Yodel" written and arranged by Frank Marocco
- "The Humpty Dance" by Digital Underground
- “Baby Got Back” by Sir Mix-a-Lot
- "Miami Vice Theme" by Jan Hammer
- "Simon Says" by Pharoahe Monch
- "Leave You Far Behind" by Lunatic Calm
- "Skullsplitter" by Hednoize
- "Song 2" by Blur
- "Billie Jean" by Michael Jackson
- "Angel" by Rod Stewart

=== Year-end charts ===
2000 year-end chart performance for Charlie's Angels
Chart (2000)	Position
Canadian Albums (Nielsen SoundScan)	58

2001 year-end chart performance for Charlie's Angels
Chart (2001)	Position
Canadian Albums (Nielsen SoundScan)	165
Canadian R&B Albums (Nielsen SoundScan)	36

=== Certifications ===
Region	Certification	Certified units/sales
Australia (ARIA)	Platinum	70,000^{^}
New Zealand (RMNZ)	Platinum	15,000^{^}
United Kingdom (BPI)	Silver	60,000^{*}
United States (RIAA)	2× Platinum	1,660,000
^{*} Sales figures based on certification alone.^{^} Shipments figures based on certification alone.

== Sequels ==
A sequel called Charlie's Angels: Full Throttle released in 2003. Diaz, Barrymore and Liu reprised their roles, as did John Forsythe as the voice of Charlie in his last film role. Following Murray's departure from the franchise, Bernie Mac joined the cast as Jimmy Bosley, John's adoptive brother, while Demi Moore had a major role, and Jaclyn Smith reprised her role as Kelly Garrett from the original television series. The franchise was confirmed for a third and fourth film, but in 2004, the ideas were cancelled.

In 2015, Sony began development on a new Charlie's Angels installment. Elizabeth Banks directed and produced the film with her producing partner and husband Max Handelman. Initially developed as a reboot of the franchise, the film is a continuation of the original TV series and the McG-directed 2000s films.

The 2019 follow-up film starred Kristen Stewart, Naomi Scott and Ella Balinska as the new generation of Angels. Banks and Djimon Hounsou also starred as Charlie's assistants, known as Bosleys, while Patrick Stewart replaced Murray in the role of John Bosley. Jaclyn Smith reprised her role as Kelly Garrett for the second time for a cameo appearance. It was also the first installment to feature Robert Clotworthy as the voice of Charlie, replacing Forsythe following his death in 2010.

== Accolades ==
Year	Award	Category	Recipients	Results	Ref.
2001	Stinkers Bad Movie Awards	Worst Picture	Charlie's Angels (Columbia)	Nominated	
2001	Stinkers Bad Movie Awards	Worst Supporting Actor	Tom Green	Won	
2001	Stinkers Bad Movie Awards	Worst On-Screen Group	The Angels	Nominated	
2001	Stinkers Bad Movie Awards	Worst Song or Song Performance Featured in a Film or Its End Credits	"Independent Women, Part 1" by Destiny's Child	Nominated	
2001	Stinkers Bad Movie Awards	Worst Resurrection of a TV Show	Charlie's Angels (Columbia)	Nominated	
2001	Stinkers Bad Movie Awards	Most Unfunny Comic Relief	Tom Green	Won	
