= Charlie's Angels (video game) =

2003 video game

- European PlayStation 2 cover art
- Developer: Neko Entertainment
- Publisher: Ubi Soft
- Director: Laurent Lichnewsky
- Designer: José Afonso
- Programmers: Stéphane Mutel; Patrice Belmonte; Sébastien Lagarde
- Artist: Sotheara Khem
- Composer: Eric Chevalier
- Platforms: PlayStation 2, GameCube
- Release: PlayStation 2: EU: 4 July 2003; GameCube: NA: 8 July 2003; EU: 25 July 2003
- Genre: Beat 'em up
- Mode: Single-player

Charlie's Angels (French: Charlie's Angels: Les Anges se Dechainent) is a 2003 beat 'em up video game developed by Neko Entertainment and published by Ubi Soft for the PlayStation 2 and GameCube.

Charlie's Angels is based on the 2000 film of the same name, itself based on the original 1970s television series created by Ivan Goff and Ben Roberts. The game follows the continuing adventures of three private investigators, Natalie Cook, Dylan Sanders, and Alex Munday, as they attempt to solve the mystery of a series of missing national monuments. The heroines do not use firearms but can utilize blunt weapons and certain environmental objects.

== Gameplay ==
The gameplay is very simple and involves fighting groups of enemies by performing punching and kicking combinations or by using weapons. Each group of enemies must be defeated before the player is allowed to progress through the game. While the player is engaged in a fight, movement to another area is impossible as invisible walls will block their way. It also featured an option to switch from playing one Angel to another. However, this option is not available during a fight and it is not required to complete the game. Occasionally, one Angel must perform a task such as pressing a switch, pulling a lever or accessing a computer so that another Angel is allowed to progress.

Most levels end when all of the Angels have completed their current objective. Unlockables such as trailers and photographs from the movie Charlie's Angels: Full Throttle can be unlocked by collecting items such as film reels and memory sticks, which are hidden in each level.

== Plot ==
The game starts with a briefing session in Charlie's office in which the Angels are informed that the Statue of Liberty has been stolen. Gameplay starts on a beach beauty pageant runway. Wearing swimsuits, Natalie and Alex must each individually fight their way from the beach through the community and warehouses to the docks. Joined there by Dylan, the three continue to each fight their way through a series of further locations.

== Reception ==
Reception

Aggregate scores
Aggregator	Score
GameRankings	NGC: 24%
Metacritic	NGC: 23/100

Review scores
Publication	Score
AllGame	1.5/5
Game Informer	2/10
GameRevolution	F
GameSpot	1.9/10
GameZone	4/10
IGN	4/10
Nintendo Power	1.5/5
Nintendo World Report	1/10
X-Play	1/5
The Village Voice	2/10

Charlie's Angels received an average score of 24% at GameRankings and an average score of 23/100 at Metacritic, indicating "generally unfavorable" reviews. On GameRankings, the GameCube version of the game holds the lowest score on the site. GamesRadar ranked it as the 50th worst game ever made. The staff commented that the game was even worse than the movie it was based on.
