= Michael M. Ryan =

American actor

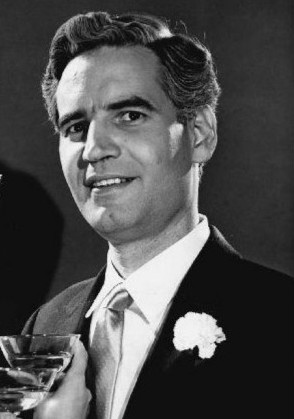
- Ryan in a publicity photo for Another World, 1965
- Born: March 19, 1929; Wichita, Kansas, U.S.
- Died: March 1, 2017 (aged 87); Kansas City, Missouri, U.S.
- Occupation: Actor
- Years active: 1960–1990
- Spouse: Camille Yoder (until his death)

Michael M. Ryan (March 19, 1929 – March 1, 2017) was an American actor. Ryan was best known for his long-running role as John Randolph on the serial Another World, which he played from November 13, 1964, until his character's death in a fire on March 6, 1979.

Among his big screen credits are the films: Tootsie, Body Heat and Slayground.

== Career ==
He was also a New York-based stage actor with many off-Broadway and Broadway roles to his credit, including the 1976 Broadway play Best Friend. He often played classic roles in regional theatre. He was a pioneer of New York City's East Village, where he moved in the late 1950s and raised his family.

Ryan also played the lead role in the daytime serial Ben Jerrod in the early 1960s, the first daytime serial to be broadcast regularly in color.

Following his departure from Another World, he made appearances on The Edge of Night on ABC and played Vince Cardello on Another Life on CBN.

== Personal life ==
Ryan was a 1952 graduate of Saint Benedict's College in Atchison, Kansas, with a bachelor's degree in political science. He acted in plays with The Raven Theatre Guild there. He worked toward a master's degree at Georgetown University before leaving to pursue a career in acting. he died on March 1 2017 in Missouri at age 87

He and his wife, Viki, whom he married in 1959, had two sons.
