= Charlie's Angels: Full Throttle =

2003 American film by McG

- Theatrical release poster
- Directed by: McG
- Screenplay by: John August; Cormac Wibberley; Marianne Wibberley
- Story by: John August
- Based on: Charlie's Angels by: Ivan Goff; Ben Roberts
- Produced by: Drew Barrymore; Leonard Goldberg; Nancy Juvonen
- Starring: Cameron Diaz; Drew Barrymore; Lucy Liu; Bernie Mac; Crispin Glover; Justin Theroux; Robert Patrick; Demi Moore
- Cinematography: Russell Carpenter
- Edited by: Wayne Wahrman
- Music by: Edward Shearmur
- Production companies: Columbia Pictures; Leonard Goldberg Productions; Flower Films; Tall Trees Productions; Wonderland Sound and Vision
- Distributed by: Sony Pictures Releasing
- Release date: June 27, 2003
- Running time: 106 minutes
- Country: United States
- Language: English
- Budget: $120 million
- Box office: $259 million

Charlie's Angels: Full Throttle is a 2003 American spy action comedy film directed by McG and written by John August, and Cormac and Marianne Wibberley. It is the sequel to 2000's Charlie's Angels and the second installment in the Charlie's Angels film series, which is a continuation of the story that began with the television series of the same name by Ivan Goff and Ben Roberts.

In an ensemble cast, Cameron Diaz, Drew Barrymore and Lucy Liu reprise their roles as the three women working for the Townsend Agency. Crispin Glover, Matt LeBlanc and Luke Wilson also reprise their roles from the first film in addition to Bill Murray appearing through archival footage with Bernie Mac, Demi Moore, Justin Theroux and Robert Patrick joining the cast. Jaclyn Smith reprised her role as Kelly Garrett from the original series for a cameo appearance. It was John Forsythe's final film role before he retired from acting in 2006, followed by his death in 2010.

It was released in the United States on June 27, 2003, by Sony Pictures Releasing under its Columbia Pictures label and was number one at the box office for that weekend, also making a worldwide total of $259 million. Like its predecessor, the film received mixed reviews from critics, with praise for the performances of Diaz, Barrymore, Liu, and Moore, but criticism aimed at the "bland plot and lack of sense".

== Plot ==
Three years after the events of the first film, after rescuing U.S. Marshal Ray Carter in Mongolia, the Angels (Natalie Cook, Dylan Sanders, and Alex Munday) and Jimmy Bosley (John Bosley's adoptive brother) are sent to recover titanium rings stolen from the United States Department of Justice that can display the people listed in the witness protection program. DOJ official William Rose Bailey and a protected witness, Alan Caulfield are among those killed.

At Caulfield's house in San Bernardino, the Angels track his assassin Randy Emmers to a beach where they meet former Angel Madison Lee. During the Coal Bowl motorcycle race, Emmers targets another witness named Max Petroni, and the Angels try to intervene.

Emmers is killed by the Thin Man (believed to be dead after the events of the first film) because he was protecting Max. Inside Emmers' pocket, the Angels discover the photos of Caulfield, Max, and, surprisingly, Dylan, under her birth name, Helen Zaas.

Dylan reveals that she is a protected witness after sending her former boyfriend, Irish mob leader Seamus O'Grady to prison. He has since targeted those who wronged him, including Dylan and Max, whose parents O'Grady killed. As Max previously testified against O'Grady, he is sent to the home of Bosley's mother for protection.

At a monastery, the Angels learn about the Thin Man's past from the Mother Superior, who reveals his name, Anthony. Afterwards, the Angels track O'Grady's mob at San Pedro and manage to get the rings, but O'Grady threatens Dylan with the murder of everyone she loves.

Natalie attends her boyfriend, Pete Kominsky's, high school reunion at Hermosa Beach. There, she overhears his friends implying he might propose, which she feels is too fast since they just moved in together. Alex returns home to her actor boyfriend, Jason, while Dylan leaves the Angels and heads to Mexico.

When Natalie, Bosley, and Alex read the letter she left for them, they realize that Dylan fled to protect them. Natalie asks Charlie how O'Grady got out of jail, and Charlie reveals someone had him released on good behaviour. While hiding out in Mexico, Dylan is convinced to return after seeing an apparition of former Angel Kelly Garrett.

Natalie and Alex deduce that Carter is the one who let O'Grady out of prison after seeing him return Bosley's keys without any pain, despite claiming to have broken his ribs recently. They deduce that Carter intended to fake his death and trail him while listening in on his phone conversations. Following him, the two witness him getting killed by Madison, the true mastermind.

Though Dylan arrives to back the group, the Angels are shot by Madison, who takes the rings, though they survived via bulletproof vests, though their car is blown up. Back at the base, Charlie reprimands Madison for what she's done and confronts her for endangering her former teammates' lives. Madison is angry she never got the recognition she deserved from Charlie and shoots his speaker.

The Angels realize that Madison is going to sell the rings to the O'Grady Crime Family, the Antonioni Mafia, the Tanaka Yakuza, and the Diablo Cartel at the Hollywood Walk of Fame, where Jason's film premiere is about to commence. The Angels arrange for the buyers to be arrested by the FBI while they confront Madison on a different rooftop.

The O'Grady's enter the melee, having avoided arrest when Seamus saw through the Angels' ruse. The Thin Man comes to the Angels' aid, helping Alex and rescuing Dylan when she is being attacked by O'Grady. He begins to fight O'Grady and kicks him off the roof. The Thin Man grabs Dylan and chokes her at first, but they end up sharing a kiss and he pulls some of Dylan's hair out.

Just as Thin Man is about to say something, O'Grady stabs him and he falls off the roof. O'Grady nearly succeeds in killing Dylan as well, but she blinds him, causing him to lose his footing and fall to his death (in the unrated cut, O'Grady is still alive and attempts to get back up but is stopped by The Thin Man, who also survived; Dylan accidentally knocks over the "E" sign and it falls on O'Grady, possibly The Thin Man as well). The Angels fight Madison all the way to an abandoned theatre, where they kick her into a chamber filled with gas after busting a gas line and she fires her gun, inadvertently blowing herself up.

The Angels attend the premiere, where they learn that Mama Bosley is adopting Max. Peter surprises Natalie by asking her to get a puppy (the big question he was planning on asking her) and Alex terminates her "time out" with Jason. The Angels celebrate their victory together with Bosley.

== Cast ==
- Cameron Diaz as Natalie Cook
- Drew Barrymore as Dylan Sanders / Helen Zaas
- Lucy Liu as Alexandra "Alex" Munday
- Bernie Mac as Jimmy Bosley, successor and adoptive brother of John Bosley
- Demi Moore as Madison Lee, a former Angel turned independent operative
- Justin Theroux as Seamus O'Grady, Dylan's ex-boyfriend and head of the O'Grady Irish Mob
- Robert Patrick as Raymond "Ray" Carter, a corrupt U.S. Marshal
- Crispin Glover as the Thin Man / Anthony, a mysterious assassin
- Rodrigo Santoro as Randall "Randy" Emmers, a surfer assassin hired by Madison
- John Forsythe as the voice of Charles "Charlie" Townsend, the owner of the Townsend agency
- Matt LeBlanc as Jason Gibbons, Alex's boyfriend
- Luke Wilson as Peter "Pete" Komisky, Natalie's boyfriend
- John Cleese as Mr. Munday, Alex's father
- Shia LaBeouf as Maxwell "Max" Petroni, an orphaned teenager targeted by the mob after his testimony
- Ja'Net DuBois as Momma Bosley, Jimmy's biological mother and John Bosley's adoptive mother

Cameos

- Jaclyn Smith as Kelly Garrett, one of the original Angels
- Bruce Willis as William Rose Bailey, Justice Department official murdered by Emmers
- Carrie Fisher as Mother Superior
- Robert Forster as Roger Wixon, Director of the FBI
- Pink as the Coal Bowl M.C.
- Mary-Kate and Ashley Olsen and Eve as the future Angels from Dylan's imagination
- Ed Robertson as the sheriff
- Wayne Federman and Steve Hytner as high school reunion buddies in the bathroom
- Melissa McCarthy as a woman at crime scene. McCarthy previously appeared in the first film as a different character, Doris.
- Big Boy and Anthony Griffith as Jimmy Bosley's cousins
- Eric Bogosian as Alan Caulfield, victim murdered by Emmers
- Chris Pontius as the Irish dock worker
- Tommy Flanagan, Chris Pontius, Jonas Barnes, and Luke Massy as Irish henchmen
- Michael Guarnera as the boss of Antonioni Mafia
- Andrew Wilson as crime scene police officer in charge
- The Pussycat Dolls as Themselves, dancing to a vamped-up "The Pink Panther Theme"

Bill Murray, who played John Bosley in the first installment, also appears in archival footage.

== Production ==
Charlie's Angels: Animated Adventures, an animated prequel series explains how the Angels got there and their mission, concluded by the very introduction of the film.

The Seamus O'Grady prison introduction scene is a direct reference to Robert De Niro's prison-set introduction in Cape Fear. Whenever O'Grady (Justin Theroux) appears, he is accompanied by Bernard Hermann's theme from Cape Fear.

Madison Lee was created with Demi Moore in mind.

The scene where the Angels go to investigate the body of Agent Caufield dressed as crime-scene professionals is a homage/parody of CSI: Crime Scene Investigation, complete with the theme "Who Are You" by The Who.

The song "Feel Good Time" is the film's main track, and is performed by Pink.

The Thin Man character perhaps pays homage to the Thin Man in the 1927 German expressionist film Metropolis, directed by Fritz Lang. In the film, Thin Man is ordered by Joh Frederson, master of Metropolis, to spy on his son Freder.

== Reception ==
=== Box office ===
Charlie's Angels: Full Throttle collected $37.6 million during its opening weekend, ranking number one ahead of Hulk. The film had a production budget of $120 million. It grossed $100,830,111 at the United States box office and had to depend on earnings from the international box office to make a profit. By the end of its run, the film had grossed $259,175,788 worldwide, underperforming its predecessor by $5 million.

=== Critical response ===
On the review aggregator website Rotten Tomatoes, 41% of 182 critics' reviews are positive. The website's consensus reads: "Eye candy for those who don't require a movie to have a plot or for it to make sense." Metacritic, which uses a weighted average, assigned the film a score of 48 out of 100, based on 39 critics, indicating "mixed or average" reviews. Audiences polled by CinemaScore gave the film an average grade of "B+" on an A+ to F scale.

Roger Ebert gave the film 2 1/2 stars out of 4, a higher score than the half star he gave to the first film. Ebert explained: "I realized I did not hate or despise the movie, and [...] I decided that I sort of liked it because of the high spirits of the women involved". In a 2 out of 5 review, Elvis Mitchell of The New York Times stated that "Charlie's Angels: Full Throttle is like eating a bowl of Honeycomb drenched in Red Bull -- a dizzying mouthful of unabashed silliness that leads to an equally precipitous crash once the buzz wears off after the film's first hour". Amy Dawes of Variety magazine wrote: "Bigger, sleeker and better than the first, sequel Charlie's Angels: Full Throttle is a joyride of a movie that takes the winning elements of the year 2000 hit to the next level".

=== Accolades ===
The film received seven nominations at the 24th Golden Raspberry Awards including Worst Picture, Worst Actress for both Drew Barrymore and Cameron Diaz, Worst Screenplay, and Worst Excuse for an Actual Movie (All Concept/No Content), winning two trophies for Worst Remake or Sequel and Worst Supporting Actress for Demi Moore. The film also received seven nominations at the 2003 Stinkers Bad Movie Awards: Worst Director (McG), Worst Actress (Barrymore), Worst Screenplay for a Film Grossing More Than $100 Million Worldwide Using Hollywood Math, Most Intrusive Musical Score, Worst Sequel, Least "Special" Special Effects, and Worst On-Screen Group (the Angels). It won for Worst Director and Most Intrusive Musical Score.

Demi Moore was nominated for the MTV Movie Award for Best Villain, but lost against co-star Lucy Liu for her role as O-Ren Ishii in Quentin Tarantino's Kill Bill: Volume 1.

== Home media ==
Charlie's Angels: Full Throttle was released on both VHS and DVD in widescreen and full-screen formats on October 21, 2003.

== Soundtrack ==
Charlie's Angels: Full Throttle

Soundtrack album by various artists
- Released: June 24, 2003
- Genres: Pop; rock; alternative metal
- Length: 49:57
- Labels: Columbia; Sony Music Soundtrax

Charlie's Angels soundtracks chronology
Charlie's Angels (2000)	Charlie's Angels: Full Throttle (2003)	Charlie's Angels (2019)

Singles from Charlie's Angels: Full Throttle
- 1. "Feel Good Time" Released: June 20, 2003

Professional ratings
Review scores
Source	Rating
AllMusic	3/5 stars

Charlie's Angels: Full Throttle is the soundtrack album to the 2003 film Charlie's Angels: Full Throttle. The album was released on June 24, 2003, by Columbia Records and Sony Music Soundtrax.

No.	Title	Writer(s)	Performed by	Length
1.	"Feel Good Time"	William Orbit; Beck Hansen; Jay Ferguson	Pink featuring William Orbit	3:56
2.	"Saturday Night's Alright (For Fighting)"	Elton John; Bernie Taupin	Nickelback featuring Kid Rock	3:44
3.	"Rebel Rebel"	David Bowie	David Bowie	4:22
4.	"Danger! High Voltage"	Steve Nawara; Tyler Spencer	Electric Six	3:34
5.	"Livin' on a Prayer"	Jon Bon Jovi; Richie Sambora; Desmond Child	Bon Jovi	4:11
6.	"Any Way You Want It"	Steve Perry; Neal Schon	Journey	3:24
7.	"Surfer Girl"	Brian Wilson	The Beach Boys	2:26
8.	"Working for the Weekend"	Paul Dean; Matt Frenette; Mike Reno	Loverboy	3:42
9.	"A Girl Like You"	Edwyn Collins	Edwyn Collins	3:59
10.	"Nas' Angels...The Flyest"	Nasir Jones; Pharrell Williams; Chad Hugo	Nas featuring Pharrell Williams	3:47
11.	"I Just Want to Be Your Everything"	Barry Gibb	Andy Gibb
12.	"This Will Be"	Chuck Jackson; Marvin Yancy	Natalie Cole	2:51
13.	"U Can't Touch This"	Stanley Burrell; Rick James; Alonzo Miller	MC Hammer	4:16
14.	"Last Dance"	Paul Jabara	Donna Summer	3:17
15.	"All Around the World (Bonus track)"		Coco Lee
Total length:				49:57

Songs in the film not included on the soundtrack:

- "Who Are You" by The Who
- "Thunder Kiss '65" by White Zombie
- "Firestarter" and "Breathe" by The Prodigy
- "Block Rockin' Beats" by The Chemical Brothers
- "Misirlou" by Dick Dale
- "Wild Thing" by Tone Lōc
- "Nuthin' but a 'G' Thang" by Dr. Dre featuring Snoop Dogg
- "Flashdance... What a Feeling" by Irene Cara
- "The Pink Panther Theme" by Henry Mancini
- "The Lonely Goatherd" by Rodgers and Hammerstein
- "Sleep Now in the Fire" by Rage Against the Machine
- "Mickey" by Toni Basil
- "Planet Claire" by The B-52s
- "Sleep Walk" by Santo & Johnny
- "Looks That Kill" by Mötley Crüe

=== Certifications ===
Region	Certification	Certified units/sales
Australia (ARIA)	Gold	35,000^{^}
New Zealand (RMNZ)	Gold	7,500^{^}
United States (RIAA)	Gold	500,000^{^}
^{^} Shipments figures based on certification alone.

== Sequel ==
Following the release of Full Throttle, the franchise was confirmed for a third and fourth film, but in 2004 the idea was canceled.

In 2015, Sony began developing the new Charlie's Angels installment. Elizabeth Banks directed and produced the film with her husband Max Handelman producing. Initially developed as a reboot of the franchise, the film is a continuation of the original TV series and the McG-directed 2000s films.

The third installment stars Kristen Stewart, Naomi Scott, and Ella Balinska as the new generation of Angels. Banks and Djimon Hounsou also star as Charlie's assistants, known as Bosleys, while Patrick Stewart replaced Bill Murray in the role of John Bosley and Jaclyn Smith reprised her role as Kelly Garrett for the second time for a cameo appearance. It is also the first installment to feature Robert Clotworthy as the voice of Charlie, replacing John Forsythe, following his death in 2010.
