= Best Friend (play) =

- Written by: Michael Sawyer
- Characters: Carolyn Parsky; Mary Tagliavini; Anita Fitzgerald; John McGovern
- Original language: English

Premiere
- Date premiered: 19 October 1976
- Place premiered: Lyceum Theatre

Best Friend was a 1976 Broadway play written by Michael Sawyer that premiered at the Lyceum Theatre on October 19, 1976 and closed on October 23, 1976 after 8 performances.

== Setting ==
In the present at an apartment on the Upper West Side.

Act I – 5;30 p.m., late August
Act II – Two hours later, the same evening

== Plot ==
It's a character study of a neurotic woman disrupting her friend's romance by falsely claiming to have a lesbian relationship with her.

== Original production ==
The show was directed by Marty Jacobs, scenery Andrew Greenhut, costumes Miles White, lighting Richard Winkler, production consultant Doug Tayler, production stage manager Michael Wieben, stage managers Victor Raider-Wexler and Ingrid Sonnichsen, and press by Lewis Harmon and Sol Jacobson.

The opening cast starred Barbara Baxley (Carolyn Parsky), Liz Sheridan (Mary Tagliavini), Mary Doyle (Anita Fitzgerald), and Michael M. Ryan (John McGovern).
