= Alice Hamlin Hinman =

American psychologist (1869–1934)

- Born: Alice Julia Hamlin; 1869; Constantinople, Turkey
- Died: April 24, 1934 (aged 64–65)
- Education: Wellesley College, Cornell University
- Spouse: Edgar Lenderson Hinman
- Children: 1
- Scientific career
- Workplaces: Mount Holyoke College; University of Nebraska
- Doctoral advisor: Edward Bradford Titchener

Alice Hamlin Hinman (December 20, 1869 – October 28, 1934) was a psychologist who changed the public school education system from backwards to progressive from 1907 to 1919 through her influence and membership on the Lincoln Board of Education.

== Biography ==
Hamlin was born Alice Julia Hamlin on December 20, 1869, in Constantinople, Turkey to Mary Eliza (Tenny) and Cyrus Hamlin. Her father was the founder and first president of Robert College in Constantinople. She was first enrolled in Abbott Academy in Andover, Massachusetts, teaching there from 1889 to 1892 while she was completing her studies. In 1893, she graduated from Wellesley College with an A.B. Degree. Hamlin studied under Edward Titchener at Cornell University gaining a Ph.D. in 1897. She was elected to the council of the American Psychological Association in 1897.

She married Edgar L. Hinman in 1897. As an assistant to her husband, she taught advanced psychology at Mount Holyoke College in 1897 and then as a professor of psychology and ethics at the University of Nebraska in 1898. She gave up full-time work, preferring to put her time into her family after the birth of her daughter, Eleanor, in 1899.

She was a member of the Lincoln Board of Education in Nebraska from 1907 to 1919. As a member, she helped to transform the school system to one of the most progressive in the country. In 1910, she became the chairman. She continued teaching on a part-time basis for thirty years, including lecturing at the School of Nursing at the University of Nebraska Medical School and other teacher's institutions throughout Nebraska and South Dakota.

She had great people skills and used her talent in a wide range of local, national and international service organizations. She taught in many schools and continued to study and write journal articles in memory, hypnotism and infant psychology. In hypnosis, she was interested in the person's identity and how it shifted into double and multiple selves, where a personal identity wasn't constant.

She died in Lincoln, Nebraska, on October 28, 1934.
