= Emma M. Baegl =

American painter and educator

- Born: 1896; Lincoln, Nebraska, U.S.
- Died: 1998; Lincoln, Nebraska, U.S.
- Resting place: Wyuka Cemetery
- Education: School of the Art Institute of Chicago
- Occupation: Painter

Emma M. Baegl (1896–1998) was an American painter and educator. She taught at the University of Nebraska–Lincoln and the Lincoln Arts Guild. Her work can be seen at the Museum of Nebraska Art.
