= Mary Doyle (actor) =

American actress

- Doyle in 1976
- Born: July 21, 1931; Lincoln, Nebraska, U.S.
- Died: June 8, 1995 (aged 63); New York City, U.S.
- Occupation: Actress
- Years active: 1956–1995
- Spouse: John A. McQiggan

Mary Doyle (July 21, 1931 – June 8, 1995) was an American theatre actress who also appeared on TV between 1956 and 1982.

== Early life and career ==
Doyle was born in Lincoln, Nebraska, and was the younger sister of actor David Doyle. She acted in productions of the Lincoln Community Playhouse and graduated from the Neighborhood Playhouse School of the Theatre.

Doyle's television appearances included The Philco Television Playhouse, Charlie's Angels and Bridget Loves Bernie, the latter two shows that featured her brother David in prominent roles. She also starred in the 1976 Broadway play Best Friend. Her other work on Broadway included performing in The Glass Menagerie (1983), Clothes for a Summer Hotel (1980), Best Friend (1976), Equus (1974), and King Henry V (1969).

== Personal life and death ==
Doyle was married to producer John A. McQiggan. She died of lung cancer in New York City, at the age of 63.
