= John Bosley (Charlie's Angels) =

Charlie's Angels character

- Charlie's Angels character
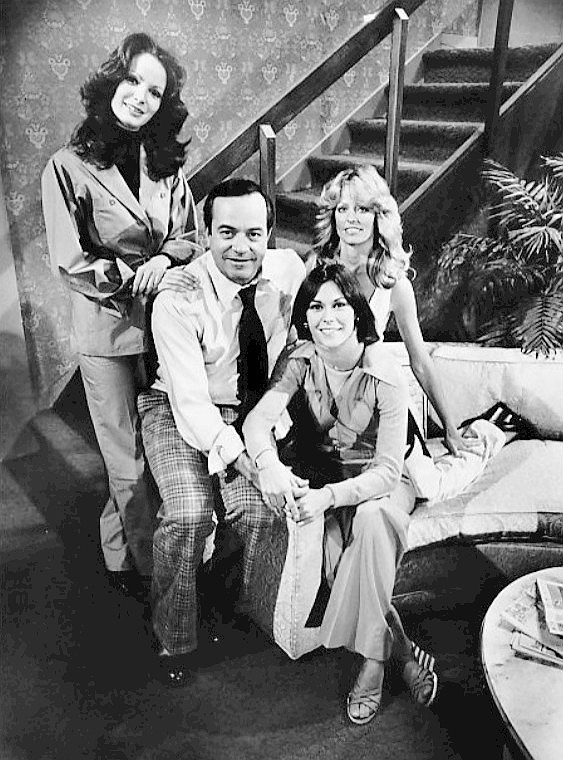
- John Bosley with the first generation of Angels in 1977.
- First appearance: "Pilot" (1976)
- Last appearance: Charlie's Angels (2019)
- Created by: Ivan Goff; Ben Roberts
- Portrayed by: David Doyle (1976–1981); Bill Murray (2000); Ramón Rodríguez (2011); Patrick Stewart (2019)

In-universe information
- Alias: Bosley 001
- Species: Human
- Gender: Male
- Occupation: Private detective Charlie Townsend's assistant
- Affiliation: Townsend Agency
- Family: Momma Bosley (adoptive mother); Jimmy Bosley (adoptive brother); Max Petroni-Bosley (adoptive brother)

Jonathan "John" Bosley is a fictional character from the Charlie's Angels franchise. He was introduced in the 1976–1981 television series, portrayed by David Doyle. Along with Kelly Garrett, Bosley is the only character to take part in every episode of the show's five-year run.

Bosley also appeared in a Charlie's Angels film in 2000, in which he was portrayed by Bill Murray, replacing Doyle following his death in 1997. He returns in another Charlie's Angels film in 2019, portrayed by Patrick Stewart, who replaced Murray following his departure from the franchise. In the short-lived reboot television series in 2011, Bosley was portrayed by Ramón Rodríguez.

== Original series ==
In early episodes, Bosley takes a playfully antagonistic role to the Angels. He also frets about vacation days, car damages, and timeliness when the opportunity arises. Bosley is apparently the only Townsend Agency employee to have ever met Charlie, and he remains steadfast in never revealing Charlie's identity, or even a clue as to what he looks like. This was a running joke in the series.

Most of the Angels found themselves romantically involved at one time or another with someone they encountered on the job, and Bosley is no exception. In one early episode, Bosley mentions a wife, but by the second season he "has not been married for some time", and he became linked with several females encountered in cases, although always those of middle age. One particularly close relationship occurred when the Angels visited Aspen, Colorado in season three. However, these liaisons never seemed to last beyond the episode, and otherwise, little is known about Bosley's private life. He remains a father figure to the Angels. Although Bosley is proficient with firearms, disguises, and accents, his actions occasionally hampered the Angels' work. In one episode, Bosley, acting as an auctioneer, gets caught up in the excitement and mistakenly sells valuable merchandise not to an Angel as per the plan, ruining their attempt to catch a cat burglar.

=== Critic's analysis ===
Boz's comic persona is integral to his function as mediator between the Angels and the enigmatic Charlie and between the show and the male viewers. Boz is Charlie's body without Charlie's voice, the surrogate for Charlie's body in the Angels' world who relays messages to Charlie and assists the Angels.

— Cathy Schwichtenberg, "A Patriarchal Voice in Heaven"

John Bosley (often nicknamed "Boz") is portrayed as a middle-aged man of average looks, especially when contrasted with the glamorous "Angels". However, he is warm, funny, and intelligent, and often helps the Angels either with background information, or by joining them in the field. Seemingly asexual (and thus unthreatening—Bosley has been described as an "indulgent eunuch"), he helped direct the Angels to meet Charlie's desired ends in the series where most men were villains and women were often victims (outside the Angels themselves). Several times he played either a pratfall-type character, the buffoon, or a Sugar Daddy as part of one of the Angels' covers. Bosley always initiates the phone conferences between Charlie and the Angels as they learn of each case. He also acts as a bumbling father figure or big brother figure to the ladies. Schwichtenberg described Bosley as a "narrative pimp"—with the sole male character (Bosley) an asexual "eunuch", the male viewer is free to desire the Angels without feeling threatened. Writing for The New York Times in 2000, Molly Haskell noted that critics, more so than the fans, saw Bosley and Charlie "more as procurers than protectors" and that the two male characters and the Angels "fell into pimp-prostitute roles along traditional gender lines".

=== Recognition ===
David Doyle was nominated for a 1977 Emmy Award for Best Supporting Actor in a Drama Series, and a 1980 Golden Globe Award for Best TV Actor in a Supporting Role.

== Films ==
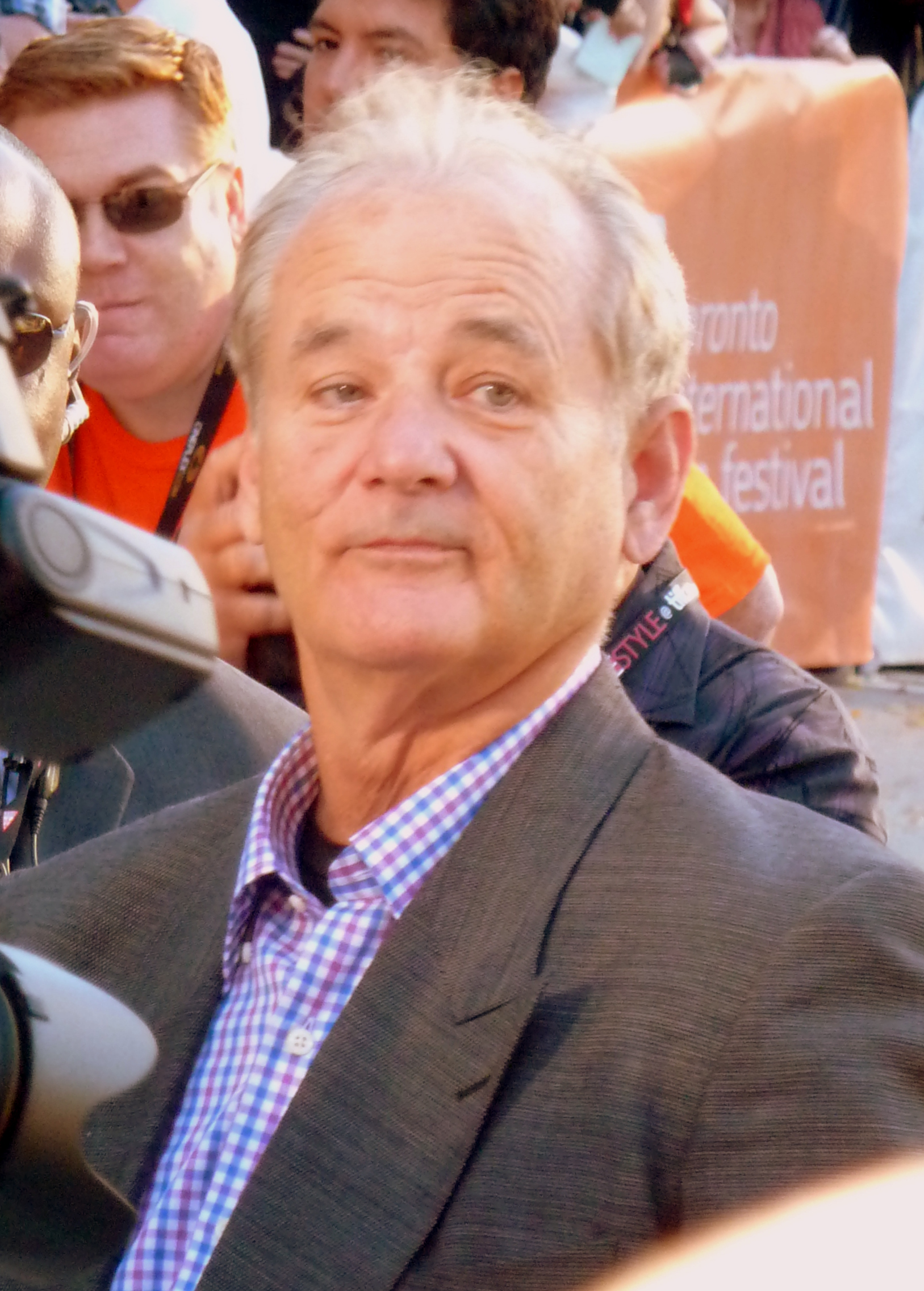
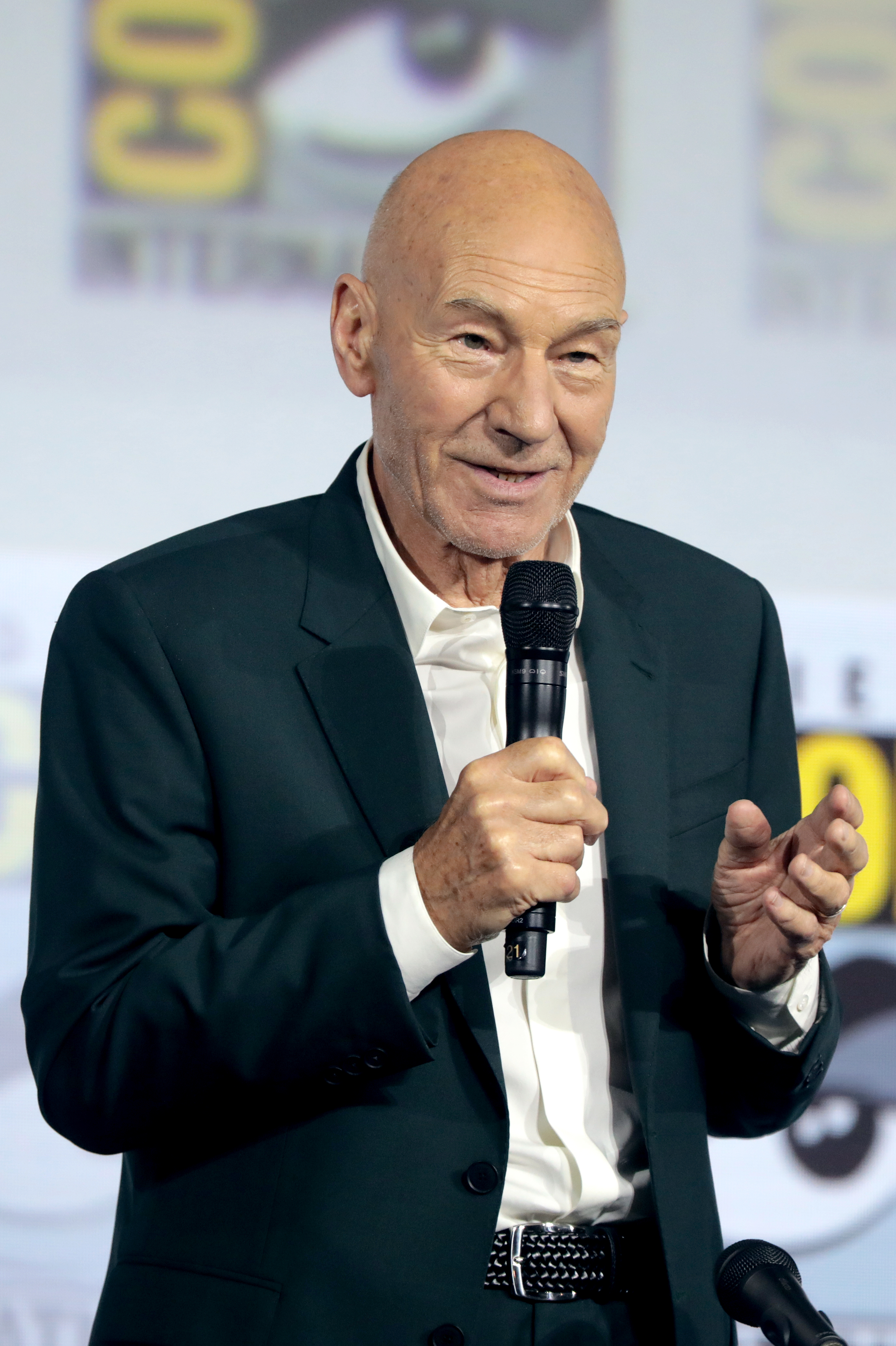
Bill Murray played Bosley in the first installment of the film series. Following his departure, Patrick Stewart portrayed the role in the third installment.

In the 2000 Charlie's Angels film, John Bosley was played by Bill Murray. Murray's take on the stodgy and avuncular Bosley character was more buffoon-like, giving rambling speeches of little or no help to the Angels. Murray's Bosley was well received; The Washington Post described him as "very funny as the Angels' fussy, butler-esque helper", but considered the fact that this was "only because Murray's funnier than the role written for him".

For the first film, Drew Barrymore, the producer and star of the film series, pursued Murray for months to play Bosley; he consistently declined. Eventually, he did the film but did not return for the sequel. Murray clashed with co-star Lucy Liu on the set; the two eventually made up, but Murray didn't want to work again with her, fearing that they would have further conflict.

In the 2003 sequel film, Charlie's Angels: Full Throttle, a new character, John's adoptive brother Jimmy Bosley played by Bernie Mac, was introduced to replace him. Bosley's adoptive mother, Momma Bosley, played by Ja'net DuBois, is also introduced in the film.

John Bosley returned in the 2019 third installment, played by Patrick Stewart. In this film, the Townsend agency has expanded internationally with multiple teams of Angels guided by multiple Bosleys, a rank named after John. After many years of service, John decided to retire from the agency. Near the end of the film, it is revealed that John is the villain, frustrated for not being chosen to replace Charlie as head of the agency, following his death.

== Reboot ==
In the 2011 reboot television series, Bosley is portrayed by Ramón Rodríguez.

In this version, Bosley is younger than the version from the original timeline. In "Angel with a Broken Wing", it's revealed that John was a hacker that was headed for a twenty-year sentence for tax fraud when Charlie got him out of it.
