= Charlie's Angels (2011 TV series) =

2011 American action crime drama television series

- Genre: Action; Crime; Drama
- Based on: Charlie's Angels by Ivan Goff; Ben Roberts
- Developed by: Alfred Gough; Miles Millar
- Starring: Annie Ilonzeh; Minka Kelly; Rachael Taylor; Ramon Rodriguez
- Theme music composer: Jack Elliott; Allyn Ferguson
- Opening theme: Charlie's Angels theme
- Ending theme: Charlie's Angels ending theme
- Composer: Louis Febre
- Country of origin: United States
- Original language: English
- No. of seasons: 1
- No. of episodes: 8 (1 unaired)

Production
- Executive producers: Marcos Siega; Drew Barrymore; Nancy Juvonen; Leonard Goldberg; Alfred Gough; Miles Millar
- Producers: Chris Miller; Tim Scanlan; Ember Truesdell; Jean Higgins; Meredith Lavender; Sonny Postiglione; Marcie Ulin; Peter Schindler
- Production locations: Miami, Florida
- Running time: 44 minutes
- Production companies: Millar/Gough Ink; Panda Productions; Flower Films; Sony Pictures Television

Original release
- Network: ABC
- Release: September 22 – November 10, 2011

Related
- Charlie's Angels (original series)

Charlie's Angels is an American action crime drama television series developed by Alfred Gough and Miles Millar. Produced by Millar/Gough Ink, Panda Productions, Flower Films and Sony Pictures Television, the series is a reboot based on the 1976 original television series of the same name created by Ivan Goff and Ben Roberts and the second series in the Charlie's Angels franchise.

Charlie's Angels premiered on ABC on September 22, 2011. On October 14, 2011, the day after the fourth episode, low ratings led ABC to cancel the series. Three more episodes aired, with the eighth episode left unaired in the United States.

== Cast and characters ==
=== Main ===
- Annie Ilonzeh as Kate Prince, a former Miami cop
- Minka Kelly as Eve French, a former street racer
- Rachael Taylor as Abby Sampson, a former thief
- Ramon Rodriguez as John Bosley, a former hacker

=== Recurring ===
- Victor Garber as the voice of Charles "Charlie" Townsend (uncredited)

=== Guest stars ===
- Carlos Bernard as Nestor Rodrigo / Pajaro, an elusive mastermind (in episode "Angel with a Broken Wing")
- Ivana Milicevic as Nadia Ivanov, a former wife of Rodrigo (in episode "Angel with a Broken Wing")
- Nadine Velazquez as Gloria Martinez, a former Angel and Eve's deceased friend (in episode "Angel with a Broken Wing")
- Isaiah Mustafa as Ray Goodson, a detective and Kate's ex-fiance (in episodes "Runway Angels" and "Royal Angels")
- Erica Durance as Samantha Masters, CIA operative and John's ex-girlfriend (in episode "Angels in Chains")
- John Terry as Victor Sampson, Abby's father (in episodes "Angels in Paradise" and "Black Hat Angels")
- Peyton List as Zoe Sinclair / Oswald, a hacker who works against the Angels (in episode "Black Hat Angels")

== Production ==
=== Development ===
A remake of the original series was announced in late 2009, when screenwriter Josh Friedman was hired to write a pilot script. Friedman's script was ultimately rejected, and ABC hired Smallville creators Alfred Gough and Miles Millar to pen a new version. In an interview, Alfred Gough expressed his desire to avoid doing anything "campy or retro." He later stated, "The characters are real and emotionally grounded, but they still like to have fun, wear great clothes, solve crime, and kick some serious ass...we hope to surprise people and bring a whole new generation to Charlie's Angels." Instead, the series was later changed into a reboot.

Robert Wagner was set to star as Charlie, but due to scheduling conflicts, had to exit the project. After an exhaustive search, Victor Garber was finally cast as the new voice of Charlie.

Veteran television director Marcos Siega directed the pilot. Filming began in Miami on March 8, 2011. On May 13, 2011, ABC picked the project up to series. ABC later announced that the show would air Thursdays at 8:00 pm Eastern/7:00 pm Central, starting at the beginning of the 2011–12 United States network television season.

=== Cancellation ===
Thirteen episodes of the series were ordered. However, after the fourth episode aired, ABC announced on October 14, 2011 that it had decided to cancel the series because of the low ratings. The eighth and final episode of the show was never aired on ABC, but was aired by AXN in Poland in late December 2011 and by Cinemax Latinoamerica and by E4 in the UK in January 2012.

Shortly before the show ended, Minka Kelly made a post of her thoughts on Twitter about the cancellation of the show with her fans. "I've had a wonderful time working with this incredible crew and amazing cast. I've made friends 4 life! A beautiful experience. #CharliesAngels." ABC president Paul Lee stated also after the cancellation of the show, “I don't think we breathed life into that franchise but I think it was a strong attempt.”

== Episodes ==
No.	Title	Directed by	Written by	Original release date	U.S. viewers (millions)
1	"Angel with a Broken Wing"	Marcos Siega	Alfred Gough & Miles Millar	September 22, 2011	8.76
When a mission involving a child slavery ring results in Gloria's (Nadine Velazquez) death, Charlie (voiced by Victor Garber) persuades Abby (Rachael Taylor) and Kate (Annie Ilonzeh) to team up with Gloria's friend, Eve (Minka Kelly). They do not know it, but Abby, Kate and Eve will always support and look out for each other. They also discover that Gloria's death is also tied to the child slavery ring's elusive mastermind, which hits too close to home and very personal for Eve, who wants to seek revenge.
2	"Runway Angels"	Angela Robinson	Sonny Postiglione, Alfred Gough & Miles Millar	September 29, 2011	7.11
Undercover at a fashion show to solve the disappearance of a runway model, the Angels discover that Kate's ex-fiancé Detective Ray Goodson (Isaiah Mustafa) is involved with the case. The model, Gabriella Tucker is found dead, and Abby goes undercover as a model in the mansion where Gabriella lived. The murder is linked to a green-card marriage scam, where the models marry criminals in exchange for money. Abby is caught talking into her comm earpiece in the bathroom and the lawyer who runs the scheme catches her. Gabriella was married to Simon Genks, really Nicoli Dinko, a former Chechen military sniper. He used his green card to get a job with a security company so he could kill the Russian first lady, as he blamed the Russians for the death of his first wife.
3	"Bon Voyage, Angels"	James Marshall	Douglas Petrie	October 6, 2011	5.93
The Angels take the case of an investigative journalist who disappears on a cruise ship, a case that connects with Kate's past.
4	"Angels in Chains"	Marcos Siega	Story by : Robert Earll; Teleplay by : Javier Grillo-Marxuach	October 13, 2011	5.91
The Angels go undercover in Cuban women's prison, in which women are being kidnapped and sold as high-level prostitutes. Note: This episode was based on an episode from the original series with both episodes sharing the same title. The series was cancelled the day after this episode, though three (of four available) produced episodes did run over the following weeks.
5	"Angels in Paradise"	Marcos Siega	Alfred Gough & Miles Millar	October 20, 2011	5.57
After a family is kidnapped and the Angels are sent to rescue them, they discover there's a bigger plan in the works. At Charlie's urging, Abby reconnects with her father when it appears that he has a connection to this latest case. Note: This episode was referenced from the two-part episodes of the same name from the original series.
6	"Black Hat Angels"	James Marshall	Douglas Petrie	November 3, 2011	5.31
The Angels trace a kidnapped artist to a gallery owner who was the victim of extortion. When they dig to identify the extortionist, they discover that Bosley's identity has been compromised, and that he has been tied to the kidnapping. In order to clear his name, they must find out who is responsible – and it's someone from Bosley's computer hacking past.
7	"Royal Angels"	J. Miller Tobin	Meredith Lavender & Marcie Ulin	November 10, 2011	5.10
When a royal African king is shot and killed, the Angels must protect the king's son (Romeo Miller), who is also a target. Note: This was the last episode to air in the United States.
8	"They Are Not Saints" "Angels Never Forget"	Kevin Bray	Javier Grillo-Marxuach, Alfred Gough & Miles Millar	Unaired	N/A
While jet-skiing on a day off, the Angels come across an unconscious man (Jason Pendergraft) whom Eve revives through mouth-to-mouth resuscitation; however, when the man (who they later discover is a Los Angeles Police Officer) is revived, he has amnesia and attempts at his life are made while the Angels protect him and help him ascertain his true identity. Eve takes a liking to the man and Bosley's feelings for her become apparent. Note: This episode was left unaired in the United States. According to Prime Video by Amazon, this episode is called "Angels Never Forget".

== Broadcast ==
- The American Forces Network, for military viewers stationed overseas.
- Canada by CTV, where it aired an hour earlier on the same night as the ABC broadcasts.
- New Zealand by TV2.
- United Kingdom by E4 aired all 8 episodes (including last episode which was never aired by ABC) through January 2012.
- Italy by Rai 2 from January 8, 2012.
- Latin America by Cinemax Latinoamerica aired all 8 episodes (including last episode which was never aired by ABC) from November 30, 2011 through January 7, 2012.
- Germany by AXN, all 8 episodes starting on May 17, 2012.
- France by Canal+ Family, all 8 episodes from October 29, 2012 through November 8, 2012. Rerun on NT1 from July 4, 2014 through July 18, 2014.

== Home media ==
Charlie's Angels was released on DVD on June 5, 2012 from Sony Pictures Home Entertainment.

== Reception ==
=== Critical response ===
The show received mostly negative reviews. Many reviewers criticized the acting, confusing plot, and useless action scenes. The review aggregator website Rotten Tomatoes reported that 0% of critics have given the series a positive review based on 32 reviews, with an average rating of 2.63/10. The site's critics consensus reads, "A thoroughly mediocre reboot of a fondly remembered series, this new Charlie's Angels lacks even the camp value needed to make it a guilty pleasure." Metacritic gives the show a weighted average score of 30 out of 100 based on reviews from 22 critics, indicating "generally unfavorable reviews".

Matthew Gilbert of The Boston Globe gave the show a "C" grade commenting "The underwhelming cast brings nothing to the boilerplate action. Kelly is miscast as a biker chick, and making Bosley a hunk with computer skills fails to add life." IGN's Matt Fowler named the pilot the worst pilot of the fall, pointing out the bad acting and writing, saying that he didn't "believe that these ladies could change a flat tire, much less take down a notorious human trafficker" and that the series should have gone dark like Nikita or copied the tone of Burn Notice.

On December 26, 2011 Hitfix.com's Alan Sepinwall listed the reboot on his "Lumps of coal: The worst TV I watched in 2011", stating "it just chose horribly wrong, with a grim, ultra-serious take that robbed whatever campy/cheesey fun you might have expected from the brand name, and with a collection of terrible performances and bad writing that undercut any attempt to give the Angels some dramatic heft."

=== Ratings ===
The pilot episode drew only a 2.1/6 among the 18–49 demos with 8.76 million viewers in Thursday slot on ABC.

Viewership and ratings per episode of Charlie's Angels
No.	Title	Air date	Rating/share (18–49)	Viewers (millions)	Ref.
1	"Angel with a Broken Wing"	September 22, 2011	2.1/6	8.76	
2	"Runway Angels"	September 29, 2011	1.5/4	7.11	
3	"Bon Voyage, Angels"	October 6, 2011	1.2/4	5.93	
4	"Angels in Chains"	October 13, 2011	1.3/4	5.91	
5	"Angels in Paradise"	October 20, 2011	1.2/4	5.57	
6	"Black Hat Angels"	November 3, 2011	1.2/3	5.31	
7	"Royal Angels"	November 10, 2011	1.1/3	5.10	
