= Ramón Rodríguez (actor) =

Puerto Rican actor

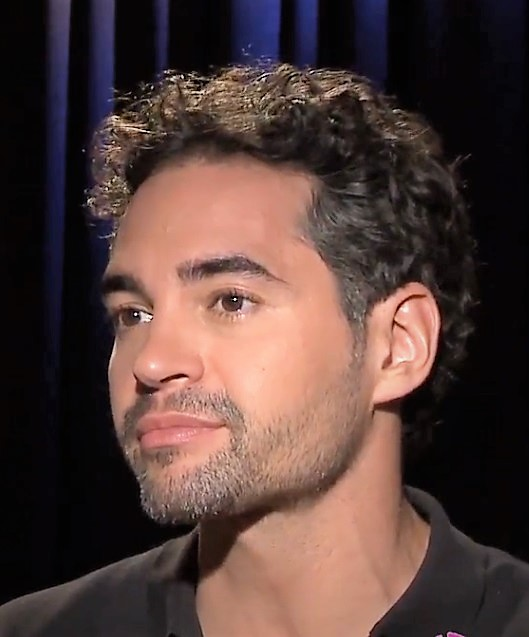
- Rodríguez interviewed by Dulce Osuna in 2017
- Born: 1979 (age 46–47); Río Piedras, San Juan, Puerto Rico
- Occupations: Actor; model; dancer
- Years active: 2005–present

Ramón Rodríguez is a Puerto Rican actor. Since 2023, he has starred as the title character in the ABC series Will Trent. His previous television work included roles in The Wire (2006–2008) and Day Break (2006–2007), and in the films Transformers: Revenge of the Fallen (2009) and The Taking of Pelham 123 (2009). He portrayed John Bosley in the 2011 reboot of Charlie's Angels. In 2014, Rodríguez starred as Ryan Lopez on the Fox crime drama television series Gang Related. In 2017, he portrayed Bakuto on the Marvel Cinematic Universe superhero television series Iron Fist and The Defenders. In 2018, he played the role of Benjamin Cruz on the Showtime television series The Affair.

== Life and career ==
Rodríguez was born in Río Piedras, San Juan, Puerto Rico. (Note: In a 2024 interview with Jimmy Kimmel on his late night talk show, Rodríguez revealed that his birthday is not on December 20 (which was listed on this article until December 2024). He joked that he would not reveal his actual birthday because he enjoys the gifts and greetings, including from co-workers and family members (cousins), on what he calls his "internet birthday" each December.) and raised on the Lower East Side of Manhattan. He attended New York City Lab School for Collaborative Studies and then The Leelanau School in Michigan, where he played basketball during his final two years. He continued playing basketball for another two years at Wheeling Jesuit University in West Virginia, before transferring to New York University, where he earned his degree in sports marketing.

Rodríguez began his career in 2005, with the role of Ángel Rodríguez in the direct-to-video film Carlito's Way: Rise to Power and the recurring role of Kevin Vasquez on two episodes of Rescue Me. He went on to appear on series such as Law & Order: Special Victims Unit, Day Break, and The Wire. He has also appeared in the films Bella (2006), Pride and Glory (2008), Surfer, Dude (2008), The Taking of Pelham 123 (2009), and Transformers: Revenge of the Fallen (2009). Rodríguez was cast as John Bosley for the television reboot of Charlie's Angels in 2011. The series was cancelled after four episodes had aired.

In 2013, he landed the lead role on the Fox crime drama series Gang Related, portraying Ryan Lopez, the adopted son of a crime lord who infiltrates the Los Angeles Police Department so his family can keep ahead of the law. The series began in 2014, but was ultimately cancelled after one season. Rodríguez then co-starred as Joe "Beasty" Peck, with Aaron Paul, in the action film Need for Speed. In 2016, Rodríguez co-starred opposite Vera Farmiga and Virginia Madsen in the adventure drama film Burn Your Maps, directed by Jordan Roberts. In 2017, he co-starred as Matt Morales in the drama biopic Megan Leavey, alongside Kate Mara, who played US Marine Megan Leavey. Also that year, he played the role of Bakuto in both the Netflix series Iron Fist and The Defenders. Since 2023, he has portrayed the titular character on the ABC series Will Trent.

== Filmography ==
Key
†	Denotes films that have not yet been released

=== Film ===
Year	Title	Role	Notes
2005	Carlito's Way: Rise to Power	Ángel Rodríguez	Direct-to-video
2006	Ira and Abby	Julio	
2006	Bella	Eduardo	
2008	Surfer, Dude	Lupe La Rosa	
2008	Pride and Glory	Ángel Tezo	
2009	The Taking of Pelham 123	Delgado	
2009	Transformers: Revenge of the Fallen	Leo Spitz	Nominated – ALMA Award for Best Actor in Film
2010	Harlem Hostel	Will	
2011	Battle: Los Angeles	William Martinez	
2014	Need for Speed	Joe "Beasty" Peck	
2016	Burn Your Maps	Batbayar	
2017	Megan Leavey	Matt Morales	
2020	The One and Only Ivan	George	
2022	Lullaby	John	
2025	G20	Agent Manny Ruiz	

=== Television ===
Year	Title	Role	Notes
2005	Rescue Me	Kevin Vasquez	2 episodes
2006	Law & Order: Special Victims Unit	DJ Manny	Episode: "Infected"
2006–2007	Day Break	Damien Ortiz	Main role; 11 episodes
2006–2008	The Wire	Renaldo	Recurring role; 8 episodes
2007	Nurses	Patrick DeLeon	Unsold pilot
2009	Exit 19	Ramón	Unsold pilot
2011	Charlie's Angels	John Bosley	Regular role; 8 episodes
2014	Gang Related	Ryan Lopez	Main role; 13 episodes
2017	Iron Fist	Bakuto	Main role; 5 episodes
2017	The Defenders	Bakuto	Main role; 4 episodes
2018	The Affair	Ben Cruz	5 episodes
2023–present	Will Trent	Will Trent	Lead role Nominated – Critics' Choice Television Award for Best Actor in a Drama Series

=== Video games ===
Year	Title	Role	Notes
2015	Battlefield Hardline	Marty, Bank Robber	Voice
2016	Homefront: The Revolution	Angelo	Voice and motion capture
