= Epic Soundtrax =

- Epic Soundtrax logo used from 1992–97.
- Parent company: Epic Records a subsidiary of Sony Music Entertainment
- Founded: 1992
- Defunct: 1997
- Status: Inactive
- Genre: Soundtracks
- Country of origin: United States
- Location: Los Angeles

Epic Soundtrax was an American record label. A division of Sony Music's Epic Records, it was established in 1992 as an imprint for soundtrack albums. It was founded by Epic's then executive vice-president, Richard Griffiths, and Glen Brunman, who served as its head.

The label was central to Epic's 1990s success, with 11 releases cumulatively selling more than 40 million records over a three-year period. Notable releases included soundtrack albums for Judge Dredd, Honeymoon in Vegas, Singles, Sleepless in Seattle, Forrest Gump, Philadelphia, Free Willy and Judgement Night.

Epic Soundtrax was deactivated in 1997 with the launch of Sony Music Soundtrax. With Brunman in charge, it served as an umbrella label for all Sony Music soundtrack releases.
