= Ella Balinska =

English actress (born 1996)

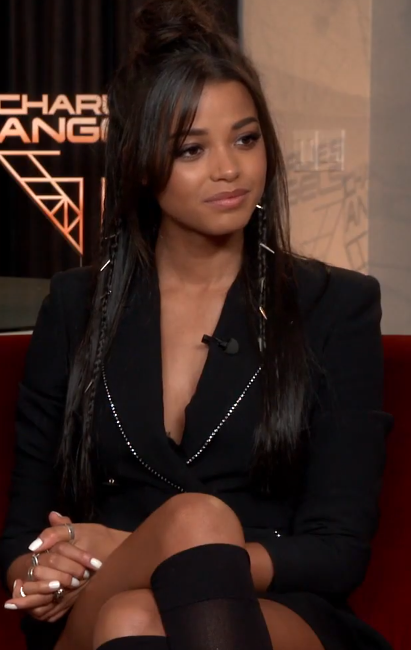
- Balinska in 2019
- Born: 4 October 1996 (age 30); London, England
- Education: University of Surrey (Acting BA)
- Occupation: Actress
- Years active: 2014–present
- Mother: Lorraine Pascale

Ella Balinska (born 4 October 1996) is a British actress who starred in the action-comedy film Charlie's Angels (2019) and the Netflix original series Resident Evil (2022).

== Early life and education ==
Balinska was born in London to Polish musician and entrepreneur Kaz Balinski Jundzill and Jamaican-British chef Lorraine Pascale. She has described her background as being a mix of "British, Polish and Caribbean". Her parents divorced in 2000. Her father is married to model Sophie Anderton.

Balinska played county-level netball and competed in track and field at a national level, having been the javelin thrower for Team London. She went to James Allen's Girls' School in Dulwich and left in 2015 to attend Arts Educational School (ArtsEd) in Chiswick for Sixth Form. She then went on to train at the Guildford School of Acting of the University of Surrey. She left during her final semester in 2018 for work and returned in 2020 to complete her degree, officially graduating with a Bachelor of Arts in Acting in 2021.

== Career ==
In 2017, Balinska obtained the lead role in the Sky Kids series The Athena (2019) as Nyela Malik. She starred alongside Kristen Stewart and Naomi Scott in the action comedy Charlie's Angels, a continuation of the 1976 television series of the same name and two previous theatrical films. It was released in November 2019, garnering mixed critical reviews.

Balinska starred in the thriller film Run Sweetheart Run, which premiered at the 2020 Sundance Film Festival. She also starred in Resident Evil, a Netflix live-action television series based on the video game series of the same name. It was released in July 2022. Balinska portrayed and voiced Frey Holland, the protagonist of the action role-playing video game Forspoken. She is set to appear in The Occupant, a science fiction thriller film.

== Personal life ==
Balinska is a supporter of the nonprofit organisation the British Fashion Council. She also set up The Ella Balinska Scholarship for students in the Guildford School of Acting at the University of Surrey who have diverse backgrounds, "giving opportunities for cultural expansion within the industry."

== Filmography ==
=== Film ===
Key
†	Denotes films that have not yet been released

Year	Title	Role	Notes
2015	Junction 9	Tanya Mason	
2015	Thanatos	Clarice Spinoza	Short film
2016	Hunted	Agent A. Fox	Short film
2017	Tiers of the Tropics	Orla	Short film
2017	Clover	Maya	Short film
2017	Room	Meghan	Short film
2017	10 Men & Gwen	Cristina	Short film
2019	Charlie's Angels	Jane Kano	
2019	Ru's Angels	Jane Kano	Short film; cameo
2020	Run Sweetheart Run	Cherie	
2024	Skincare	Jessica	
2025	Marked Men: Rule + Shaw	Ayden Cross	
2025	The Occupant	Abby	
2027	Beach Read †	TBA	Filming

=== Television ===
Year	Title	Role	Notes
2018	Casualty	Susie Barbour	Season 32, episode 33
2018	Midsomer Murders	Grace Briggs	Episode: "Till Death Do Us Part"
2019	The Athena	Nyela Malik	Main role; 26 episodes
2022	Resident Evil	Jade Wesker	8 episodes

=== Video games ===
Year	Title	Role	Notes
2023	Forspoken	Frey Holland	Likeness, voice, and motion capture

=== Music videos ===
Year	Artist	Song
2026	Muse	"Be with You"

== Awards and nominations ==
Year	Awards	Category	Nominated work	Result	Ref.
2019	Screen Nation Film and Television Awards	Rising Star	The Athena	Nominated	
2020	National Film Awards UK	Best Actress	Charlie's Angels	Nominated	
2020	National Film Awards UK	Best Newcomer	Charlie's Angels	Nominated	
2020	Huading Awards	Best Global New Performer in a Motion Picture	Charlie's Angels	Nominated	
2021	University of Surrey Vice-Chancellor’s Alumni Awards	Young Achiever of the Year	Personal achievements	Won	
2024	NAVGTR Awards	Lead Performance in a Drama	Forspoken	Nominated	
