= David Doyle =

American actor (1929–1997)

- Doyle in Charlie's Angels, 1978
- Born: David Fitzgerald Doyle; December 1, 1929; Lincoln, Nebraska, U.S.
- Died: February 26, 1997 (aged 67); Los Angeles, California, U.S.
- Occupation: Actor
- Years active: 1955–1997
- Spouses: Rachael Doyle (m. 1956; died 1968) Anne Nathan Doyle (m. 1969)
- Children: 1
- Relatives: Mary Doyle (sister)

David Fitzgerald Doyle (December 1, 1929 – February 26, 1997) was an American actor. He was best known for his portrayal of John Bosley on the 1970s TV series Charlie's Angels. Doyle and Jaclyn Smith were the only actors to appear in every episode of the show. Doyle also became known later as the first voice of Grandpa Lou on the Nickelodeon series Rugrats.

== Early life ==
Born in Lincoln, Nebraska, Doyle graduated from Campion High School in Prairie du Chien, Wisconsin in 1947.

His maternal grandfather, John Fitzgerald, was a prominent railroad builder and banker in Nebraska. His younger sister, Mary (1931–1995), was a stage actress, who died from lung cancer aged 63.

== Career ==
Doyle is best remembered for his role as detective John Bosley on the television series Charlie's Angels, one of only two actors (the other being original angel Jaclyn Smith) to appear in all 110 episodes of the series (1976–1981).

He appeared in 3 episodes of The Patty Duke Show as the father of Richard Harrison.

Doyle made a number of appearances as a guest on the game show Match Game from 1977 to 1982, usually on the top row next to regular panelists Brett Somers and Charles Nelson Reilly. He appeared on one week of Password Plus in 1980, three weeks of Super Password, and on Tattletales with his wife Anne in 1982.

He voiced Grandpa Lou Pickles on the Nickelodeon animated series Rugrats from 1991 until his death, after which he was replaced by Joe Alaskey.

Doyle was also a stage actor. He played Orgon in the 1964 premiere of Richard Wilbur's translation of Tartuffe at the Fred Miller Theater in Milwaukee. His sister Mary played the maid, Dorine, in the same production. His New York stage credits include Beg, Borrow or Steal, Something About a Soldier, Here's Love, I Was Dancing, and a revival of South Pacific.

== Personal life ==
Doyle was married twice. In 1956 he married his first wife, Rachael, with whom he had a daughter, Leah (born 1961). Rachael died in 1968 after falling from a staircase. The next year, while in a revival of the play South Pacific, Doyle met Anne Nathan, a singer dancer, and they married a short time later.

== Death ==
Doyle died in Los Angeles, California, of a heart attack on February 26, 1997, at age 67.

The Season 5 Rugrats episode "Lady Luck" (Doyle's last episode voicing Grandpa Lou) aired posthumously in November of that year, and was dedicated to his memory.

== Filmography ==
=== Film ===
Year	Title	Role	Notes
1959	Happy Anniversary	Hotel Earle desk clerk	Credited as David F. Doyle
1963	Act One	Oliver Fisher	
1967	The Tiger Makes Out	Housing clerk	
1968	No Way to Treat a Lady	Lieutenant Dawson	
1968	Coogan's Bluff	Pushie	Credited as David F. Doyle
1968	Paper Lion	Oscar	
1969	The April Fools	Orlow P. Walters	
1969	Some Kind of a Nut	Larry	
1970	Loving	Will	
1970	Pigeons	Mr. Seigbert	Uncredited
1971	The Pursuit of Happiness	James Moran	
1971	A New Leaf	Mel	
1971	Making It	Fanning	
1971	Who Killed Mary What's 'Er Name?	Roger Boulting	
1971	Lady Liberty	O'Henry	
1972	Parades	Captain Jinks	
1974	Ginger in the Morning	Fred	
1976	Vigilante Force	Homer Arno	
1977	Capricorn One	Walter Loughlin	
1978	The Comeback	Webster Jones	
1979	My Boys Are Good Boys	Harry Klinger	
1980	The Line	Captain Jinks	
1988	Salome's Last Dance	A. Nubin	
1989	Ghost Writer	Herb Baxter	
1989	Murphy's Laws of Golf	Roscoe	Short film
1990	Love or Money	Arthur Reed	
1990	Wings of Fame		
1996	The Adventures of Pinocchio	Pepe the Cricket	Voice role

=== Television ===
Year	Title	Role	Notes
1959, 1961	The Art Carney Special	Self	2 episodes
1961	Naked City	Dan Moore	Episode: "Murder Is a Face I Know"
1962	General Electric Theater	Burton Fairbanks	Episode: "Acres and Pains"
1962, 1963	Car 54, Where Are You?	Dutton, Holland, Daniels	3 episodes (uncredited)
1964	The Defenders	Lester Pringle	Episodes: "The Seven Hundred Year Old Gang: Parts 1 and 2"
1964–65	The Patty Duke Show	Jonathan Harrison / Mr. Harrison	3 episodes
1965	For the People	Sweet William	Episode: "Dangerous to the Public Peace and Safety"
1965	The Trials of O'Brien	Murray	Episode: "A Gaggle of Girls"
1968	Kiss Me Kate	Harry Trevor	TV movie
1970	The Storefront Lawyers	Cogweiler	Episode: "This is Jerry, See Jerry Run"
1971	That Girl	Albert Berg	Episode: "That King"
1971	Funny Face	DeHaven	Episode: "What's in a Mouth"
1971	Cade's County	Dr. Geis	Episode: "A Gun For Billy"
1971	The Doris Day Show	Warden McPherson	Episode: "The Wings of an Angel"
1971–72	The New Dick Van Dyke Show	Ted Atwater	4 episodes
1972	Hawaii Five-O	Hard Hat	Episode: "Follow the White Brick Road"
1972	Bridget Loves Bernie	Walt Fitzgerald	
1973	Banacek	Elliot	Episode: "Ten Thousand Dollars a Page"
1973	Incident on a Dark Street	Luke Burgess	TV movie, failed premise pilot
1973	Police Story	Kurt Mueller	TV movie, premise pilot
1973	Adam's Rib	Dubray	Episode: "Danish Pastry"
1973	Love, American Style		Segment: "Love and the Golden Memory"
1973	Money to Burn	Warden Caulfield	ABC Movie of the Week
1973	Love Story	Ross	Episode: "Mirabelle's Summer"
1973	Blood Sport	Mr. Schmidt	TV movie
1973	Miracle on 34th Street	R.H. Macy	TV movie
1974	Family Theatre: Married is Better		TV special
1974	All in the Family	Jim Sanders	Episode: "Et tu, Archie"
1974	Petrocelli	Caswell Turner	Episode: "Music to Die By"
1974	The Stranger Within	Bob	ABC Movie of the Week
1974	Kolchak: The Night Stalker	Cardinale	Episode: "Firefall"
1974	Kojak	Sgt. Harry Sumar	Episode: "The Best War in Town"
1974, 1975	Police Story	Harry Dunnhill, Ralph Driscoll	2 episodes
1975	Sanford and Son	Clancy Fitzgerald	Episode: "Golden Boy"
1975	Karen	Blakemore	Episode: "A Day in the Life"
1975	The First 36 Hours of Dr. Durant	Dr. Atkinson	TV movie, unsold pilot
1975	Ellery Queen	Don Becker	Episode: "The Adventures of Auld Lang Syne"
1975	Barney Miller	Emil Ditka	Episode: "Ambush"
1975	McCoy		Episode: "Bless the Big Fish"
1976	Crackle of Death	Cardinale	TV movie
1976–81	Charlie's Angels	John Bosley	Main cast Nominated - Primetime Emmy Award for Outstanding Supporting Actor in a Drama Series; Nominated - Golden Globe for Best Supporting Actor – Television Series
1977	ABC Weekend Special	Uncle Ulysses	Episode: "Homer and the Wacky Doughnut Machine"
1977	Black Market Baby	Joseph Carmino	TV movie
1978	Wild and Wooly	Teddy Roosevelt	TV movie
1978–83	Fantasy Island	Ernie Miller / Fred Forbush / Sam Woolf / Sancho Panza / Herbert Solomon	4 episodes
1978–85	The Love Boat	Alvin / Cliff	4 episodes
1981	Hart to Hart	Jim Casey	Episode: "Hartland Express"
1982	The Blue and the Gray	Phineas Wade	Miniseries
1983	Wait till Your Mother Gets Home!	Herman Ohme	TV movie
1983	The Invisible Woman	Neil Gillmore	TV movie
1983	The Fall Guy	Crase	Episode: "Wheels"
1985	Murder, She Wrote	Brad Lockwood	Episode: "Sudden Death"
1986	You Again?	Briggs	Episode: "Life, Liberty and the Pursuit of Traffic Lights"
1986	New Love, American Style		Episode: "Love and the Lamborghini"
1986	Foofur	Mel	Voice role
1986–87	General Hospital	Ted Holmes	
1987	Starman	Artemis Guinness	Episode: "Grifters"
1987	Sweet Surrender	Frank Macklin	
1988	Maybe Baby	Pete	TV movie
1989	Ghost Writer	Herb Baxter	TV movie
1989	Out of This World	Star the Dog	Episode: "Star Dog", voice role
1990	TaleSpin	Sheriff Gomer Cleghorn	Episode: "Citizen Khan", voice role
1990	Archie: To Riverdale and Back Again	Mr. Weatherbee	TV movie
1991	They Do It With Mirrors	Neville	TV movie
1991–97	Rugrats	Grandpa Lou Pickles, various voices	Recurring role
1993	Bonkers	W.W. Whacky	Episode: "Gone Bonkers", voice role
1993	Sonic the Hedgehog	Additional voices	
1994	Beethoven	Police Officer Frank, Blind Shep, Old Man	Episode: "The Mighty Cone-Dog", voice role
1995–1996	The Magic School Bus	Jake Tennelli	Voice, 2 episodes: "Flexes Its Muscles" and "Works Out"
1995	What-a-Mess	Additional voices	
1996	The Ruth Rendell Mysteries	Dean	Episode: "Simisola"
1996	Road Rovers	Professor Hubert	Episode: "A Hair of the Dog That Bit You", voice role
1996	Lois & Clark: The New Adventures of Superman	Mike, guardian angel	Episode: "Swear to God, This Time We're Not Kidding"
1996	Mighty Ducks: The Animated Series	Sam Delaney	Episode: "The Human Factor", voice role
1996	Quack Pack	Additional voices	Episode: "The Unusual Suspects"
1997	The Blues Brothers Animated Series	Vet	Episode: "Strange Death of Betty Smythe", voice role (posthumous release)
1997	Sunset Beach	Passenger	Episode: 1.1
1997	What the Deaf Man Heard		TV movie (posthumous release)

Preceded by none	Voice of Grandpa Lou Pickles; 1991–1997	Succeeded by Joe Alaskey
