= List of awards and nominations received by Cameron Diaz =

Actor recognition list

Cameron Diaz awards and nominations
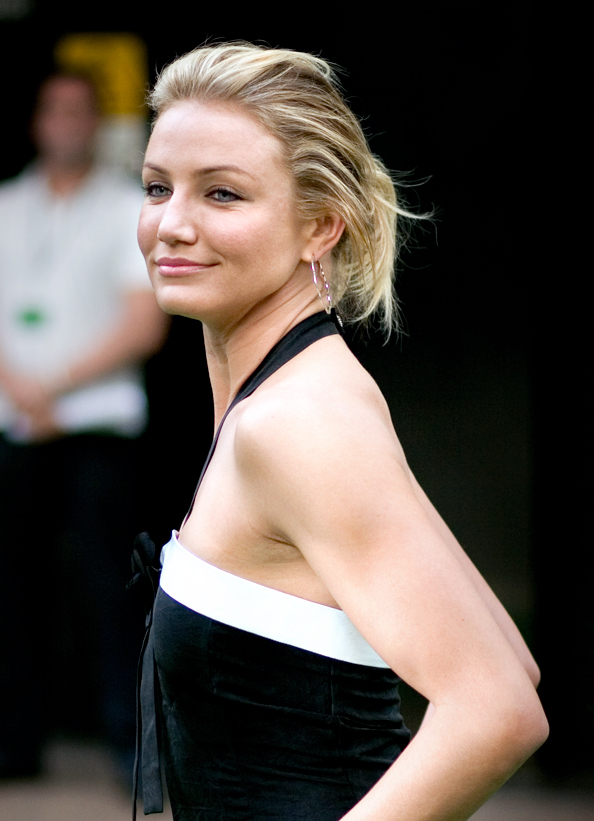
- Diaz in 2007
Awards and nominations
Award	Wins	Nominations
Actor Award	0	3
BAFTA Awards	0	1
Critics' Choice	0	1
Golden Globe Awards	0	4

Totals (Note: Certain award groups do not simply award one winner. They acknowledge several different recipients, have runners-up, and have third place. Since this is a specific recognition and is different from losing an award, runner-up mentions are considered wins in this award tally. For simplification and to avoid errors, each award in this list has been presumed to have had a prior nomination.)
- Wins: 27
- Nominations: 108

The following is the list of awards and nominations received by Cameron Diaz

Cameron Diaz is an American actress known for her leading roles in dramatic and comedic films. She has received various accolades including three MTV Movie Awards, two Nickelodeon Kids' Choice Awards, a People's Choice Award and two Teen Choice Awards nominations for three Actor Awards, a BAFTA Film Award, a Critics' Choice Movie Award and four Golden Globe Awards. She was awarded the Elle Women in Hollywood Awards's Icon Award in 2001 and a Motion Picture Star on the Hollywood Walk of Fame in 2009.

Diaz made her film debut playing a glamorous blonde in the superhero comedy The Mask (1994) starring opposite Jim Carrey. The role earned her nominations for three MTV Movie Award nominations. She then took a leading role in the Peter Farrelly directed romantic comedy There's Something About Mary (1998) for which she was nominated for the Golden Globe Award for Best Actress in a Motion Picture – Musical or Comedy and won the American Comedy Award, the MTV Movie Award, the New York Film Critics Circle Award, and the Teen Choice Award for Best Leading Actress.

She took a dramatic role playing a restless woman in the Spike Jonez and Charlie Kaufman surrealist dramedy Being John Malkovich (1999) for which she was nominated for the Actor Award for Outstanding Performance by a Female Actor in a Supporting Role, the BAFTA Award for Best Actress in a Supporting Role and the Golden Globe Award for Best Supporting Actress – Motion Picture. She portrayed an obsessive lover in the Cameron Crowe directed psychological science-fiction thriller Vanilla Sky (2001) opposite Tom Cruise. The role earned her nominations for the Actor Award for Outstanding Performance by a Female Actor in a Supporting Role, the Critics' Choice Movie Award for Best Supporting Actress, and the Golden Globe Award for Best Supporting Actress – Motion Picture.

She has received four Golden Globe Award nominations: one for Best Actress in a Motion Picture Comedy or Musical for her performance in There's Something About Mary (1998), and three for Best Supporting Actress in a Motion Picture (for Being John Malkovich, Vanilla Sky and Gangs of New York). She has also received nominations for three Screen Actors Guild Awards: two for Outstanding Performance by a Female Actor in a Supporting Role (for Being John Malkovich and Vanilla Sky) and one for Outstanding Performance by a Cast in a Motion Picture for Being John Malkovich. In 2009, she received a star on the Hollywood Walk of Fame for her work in film.

== Major associations ==
=== Actor Awards ===
Year	Category	Nominated work	Result	Ref.
1999	Outstanding Actress in a Supporting Role	Being John Malkovich	Nominated	
1999	Outstanding Ensemble in a Motion Picture (Note: Shared with the cast)	Being John Malkovich	Nominated	
2001	Outstanding Actress in a Supporting Role	Vanilla Sky	Nominated	

=== BAFTA Awards ===
Year	Category	Nominated work	Result	Ref.
British Academy Film Awards
1999	Best Actress in a Supporting Role	Being John Malkovich	Nominated	

=== Critics' Choice Awards ===
Year	Category	Nominated work	Result	Ref.
Critics' Choice Movie Awards
2001	Best Supporting Actress	Vanilla Sky	Nominated	

=== Golden Globe Awards ===
Year	Category	Nominated work	Result	Ref.
1998	Best Actress in a Motion Picture – Musical or Comedy	There's Something About Mary	Nominated	
1999	Best Supporting Actress – Motion Picture	Being John Malkovich	Nominated	
2001	Best Supporting Actress – Motion Picture	Vanilla Sky	Nominated	
2002	Best Supporting Actress – Motion Picture	Gangs of New York	Nominated	

== Critics awards ==
Award	Year	Category	Work	Result	Ref.
Alliance of Women Film Journalists Awards	2013	Actress Most In Need of a New Agent	The Counselor	Won	
Alliance of Women Film Journalists Awards	2015	Actress Most In Need of a New Agent	The Other Woman / Sex Tape / Annie	Won	
Award Circuit Community Awards	1998	Best Lead Actress	There's Something About Mary	Nominated	
Award Circuit Community Awards	1999	Best Supporting Actress	Being John Malkovich	Nominated	
Award Circuit Community Awards	1999	Best Cast Ensemble	Being John Malkovich	Nominated	
Award Circuit Community Awards	2002	Best Cast Ensemble	Gangs of New York	Nominated	
Boston Society of Film Critics Awards	2001	Best Supporting Actress	Vanilla Sky	Won	
Chicago Film Critics Association Awards	2002	Best Supporting Actress	Vanilla Sky	Won	
Dallas-Fort Worth Film Critics Association Awards	2002	Best Supporting Actress	Vanilla Sky	Nominated	
Imagen Foundation Awards	2004	Best Actress	Charlie's Angels: Full Throttle	Won	
Imagen Foundation Awards	2006	Best Actress	In Her Shoes	Nominated	
Las Vegas Film Critics Society Awards	2000	Best Supporting Actress	Being John Malkovich	Nominated	
New York Film Critics Circle Awards	1998	Best Actress	There's Something About Mary	Won	
Online Film & Television Association Awards	1998	Best Music - Adapted Song	My Best Friend's Wedding	Won	
Online Film & Television Association Awards	2000	Best Supporting Actress	Being John Malkovich	Nominated	
Online Film Critics Society Awards	2000	Best Supporting Actress	Being John Malkovich	Nominated	
Phoenix Film Critics Society Awards	2002	Best Supporting Actress	Vanilla Sky	Nominated	
ShoWest Convention Awards	1996	Female Star of Tomorrow		Won	

== Miscellaneous accolades ==
Award	Year	Category	Work	Result	Ref.
20/20 Awards	2018	Best Supporting Actress	My Best Friend's Wedding	Nominated	
ALMA Awards	1998	Outstanding Crossover Role in a Feature Film	My Best Friend's Wedding	Won	
ALMA Awards	1999	Outstanding Actress in a Feature Film in a Crossover Role	There's Something About Mary	Nominated	
ALMA Awards	2000	Outstanding Actress in a Feature Film	Any Given Sunday	Won	
ALMA Awards	2002	Outstanding Supporting Actress in a Motion Picture	Vanilla Sky	Nominated	
ALMA Awards	2007	Outstanding Actress - Motion Picture	The Holiday	Nominated	
ALMA Awards	2009	Actress in Film	My Sister's Keeper	Nominated	
ALMA Awards	2011	Favorite Movie Actress - Comedy/Musical	Bad Teacher	Nominated	
ALMA Awards	2012	Favorite Movie Actress - Comedy/Musical	What to Expect When You're Expecting	Nominated	
American Comedy Awards	1999	Funniest Lead Actress in a Motion Picture	There's Something About Mary	Won	
American Comedy Awards	2000	Funniest Supporting Actress in a Motion Picture	Being John Malkovich	Nominated	
American Film Institute Awards	2002	Featured Actor of the Year - Female - Movies	Vanilla Sky	Nominated	
Annie Awards	2011	Best Voice Acting in an Animated Feature Production	Shrek Forever After	Nominated	
Blockbuster Entertainment Awards	1998	Favorite Supporting Actress - Comedy	My Best Friend's Wedding	Won	
Blockbuster Entertainment Awards	1999	Favorite Actress - Comedy	There's Something About Mary	Won	
Blockbuster Entertainment Awards	2000	Favorite Actress - Drama	Any Given Sunday	Won	
Blockbuster Entertainment Awards	2001	Favorite Action Team - Internet Only (Note: Shared with Drew Barrymore & Lucy Liu)	Charlie's Angels	Won	
Chlotrudis Awards	2000	Best Supporting Actress	Being John Malkcovich	Nominated	
CinemaCon Awards	2011	Female Star of the Year	Herself	Won	
Golden Raspberry Awards	2004	Worst Actress	Charlie's Angels: Full Throttle	Nominated	
Golden Raspberry Awards	2009	Worst Actress	What Happens in Vegas	Nominated	
Golden Raspberry Awards	2009	Worst Screen Couple (shared with Ashton Kutcher)	What Happens in Vegas	Nominated	
Golden Raspberry Awards	2015	Worst Actress	The Other Woman / Sex Tape	Won	
Golden Raspberry Awards	2015	Worst Supporting Actress	Annie	Nominated	
Golden Raspberry Awards	2015	Worst Screen Combo (shared with Jason Segel)	Sex Tape	Nominated	
Golden Schmoes Awards	2001	Best Supporting Actress of the Year	Vanilla Sky	Nominated	
Irish Film and Television Awards	2004	Best International Actress	Shrek 2	Nominated	
Italian Online Movie Awards	2003	Best Supporting Actress	Gangs of New York	Nominated	
Jupiter Awards	2012	Best International Actress	Bad Teacher	Won	
MTV Movie + TV Awards	1995	Best Breakthrough Performance	The Mask	Nominated	
MTV Movie + TV Awards	1995	Most Desirable Female	The Mask	Nominated	
MTV Movie + TV Awards	1995	Best Dance Sequence (Note: Shared with Jim Carrey)	The Mask	Nominated	
MTV Movie + TV Awards	1998	Best Dance Sequence (Note: Shared with Ewan McGregor)	A Life Less Ordinary	Nominated	
MTV Movie + TV Awards	1999	Best Female Performance	There's Something About Mary	Won	
MTV Movie + TV Awards	1999	Best Comedic Performance	There's Something About Mary	Nominated	
MTV Movie + TV Awards	1999	Best On-Screen Duo (Note: Shared with Ben Stiller)	There's Something About Mary	Nominated	
MTV Movie + TV Awards	1999	Best Kiss	There's Something About Mary	Nominated	
MTV Movie + TV Awards	2001	Best Dance Sequence	Charlie's Angels	Won	
MTV Movie + TV Awards	2001	Best On-Screen Team	Charlie's Angels	Won	
MTV Movie + TV Awards	2001	Best Line from a Movie	Charlie's Angels	Nominated	
MTV Movie + TV Awards	2002	Best On-Screen Team (Note: Shared with Mike Myers & Eddie Murphy)	Shrek	Nominated	
MTV Movie + TV Awards	2003	Best Kiss (Note: Shared with Leonardo DiCaprio)	Gangs of New York	Nominated	
MTV Movie + TV Awards	2004	Best Dance Sequence	Charlie's Angels: Full Throttle	Nominated	
MTV Movie + TV Awards	2007	Best Kiss (Note: Shared with Jude Law)	The Holiday	Nominated	
MTV Movie + TV Awards	2014	Best WTF Moment	The Counselor	Nominated	
MTV Movie Awards, Mexico	2004	Best Look	Charlie's Angels: Full Throttle	Nominated	
Nickelodeon Kid's Choice Awards	2001	Best Burp	—N/a	Won	
Nickelodeon Kid's Choice Awards	2001	Favorite Movie Actress	Charlie's Angels	Nominated	
Nickelodeon Kid's Choice Awards	2002	Favorite Voice from an Animated Movie	Shrek	Nominated	
Nickelodeon Kid's Choice Awards	2004	Favorite Movie Actress	Charlie's Angles: Full Throttle	Nominated	
Nickelodeon Kid's Choice Awards	2005	Favorite Voice from an Animated Movie	Shrek 2	Nominated	
Nickelodeon Kid's Choice Awards	2008	Favorite Voice from an Animated Movie	Shrek the Third	Nominated	
Nickelodeon Kid's Choice Awards	2008	Wannabe Award	—N/a	Won	
Nickelodeon Kid's Choice Awards	2011	Favorite Voice from an Animated Movie	Shrek Forever After	Nominated	
Nickelodeon Kid's Choice Awards	2015	Favorite Movie Actress	Annie	Nominated	
Nickelodeon Kid's Choice Awards	2015	Favorite Villain	Annie	Nominated	
NRJ Cine Awards	2007	Best Kiss	The Holiday	Nominated	
People's Choice Awards	2006	Favorite Leading Lady	In Her Shoes	Nominated	
People's Choice Awards	2007	Favorite Leading Lady	The Holiday	Won	
People's Choice Awards	2012	Favorite Comedic Movie Actress	Bad Teacher	Nominated	
People's Choice Awards	2013	Favorite Comedic Movie Actress	What to Expect When You're Expecting	Nominated	
People's Choice Awards	2015	Favorite Comedic Movie Actress	The Other Woman	Nominated	
Satellite Awards	1998	Best Supporting Actress in a Motion Picture - Comedy or Musical	My Best Friend's Wedding	Nominated	
Satellite Awards	2000	Best Supporting Actress in a Motion Picture - Comedy or Musical	Being John Malkovich	Nominated	
Satellite Awards	2001	Best Supporting Actress in a Motion Picture - Comedy or Musical	Charlie's Angels	Nominated	
Saturn Awards	2001	Best Supporting Actress	Charlie's Angels	Nominated	
Saturn Awards	2002	Best Supporting Actress	Vanilla Sky	Nominated	
The Stinkers Bad Movie Awards	2002	Worst Song or Song Performance in a Film or its End Credits (Note: Shared with Christina Applegate & Selma Blair)	The Sweetest Thing	Won	
Teen Choice Awards	1999	Choice Movie Actress	There's Something About Mary	Nominated	
Teen Choice Awards	1999	Choice Movie - Disgusting Scene	There's Something About Mary	Won	
Teen Choice Awards	2000	Choice Movie Actress	Being John Malkovich	Nominated	
Teen Choice Awards	2000	Choice Movie - Hissy Fit	Any Given Sunday	Nominated	
Teen Choice Awards	2002	Choice Hottie - Female	Herself	Nominated	
Teen Choice Awards	2002	Choice Movie Actress - Comedy	The Sweetest Thing	Nominated	
Teen Choice Awards	2002	Choice Movie - Hissy Fit	The Sweetest Thing	Nominated	
Teen Choice Awards	2003	Choice Movie - Liplock	Gangs of New York	Nominated	
Teen Choice Awards	2007	Choice Movie - Hissy Fit	The Holiday	Nominated	
Teen Choice Awards	2008	Choice Movie Actress - Comedy	What Happens in Vegas	Nominated	
Teen Choice Awards	2009	Choice Summer Movie Star - Female	My Sister's Keeper	Nominated	
Teen Choice Awards	2010	Choice Summer Movie Star - Female	Knight and Day	Nominated	
Teen Choice Awards	2011	Choice Movie Actress - Comedy	Bad Teacher	Won	
Teen Choice Awards	2012	Choice Movie Actress - Comedy	What to Expect When You're Expecting	Nominated	
Teen Choice Awards	2014	Choice Movie Actress - Comedy	The Other Woman	Nominated	
Teen Choice Awards	2014	Choice Movie - Chemistry (Note: Shared with Leslie Mann & Kate Upton)	The Other Woman	Nominated	

== Honorary awards ==
Organizations	Year	Award	Result	Ref.
Elle Women in Hollywood Awards	2001	Icon Award	Honored	
Hollywood Walk of Fame	2009	6712 Hollywood, Blvd. - Motion Picture	Honored	
