= Cameron Diaz filmography =

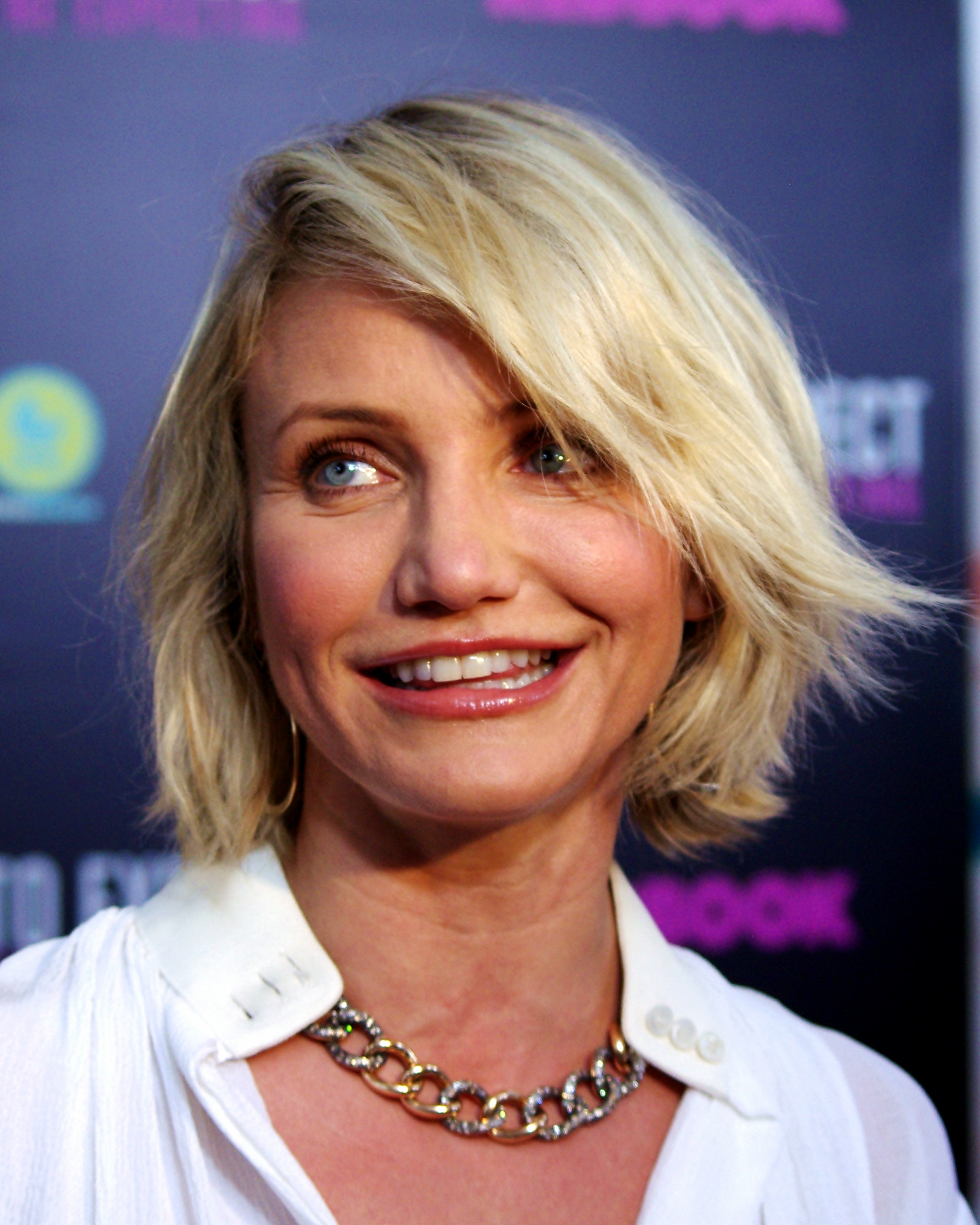
Diaz in 2012

Cameron Diaz is an American actress who has appeared in over 40 films throughout the course of her career, which spans over three decades. Originally a model, Diaz made her film debut in the comedy The Mask (1994). Followed by supporting roles in several independent films and comedies, such as My Best Friend's Wedding (1997), she has the starring role of Mary in the hit comedy There's Something About Mary (1998), which earned her a Golden Globe Award nomination for Best Lead Actress in a Comedy or Musical. She was subsequently cast in Spike Jonze's surrealist fantasy film Being John Malkovich (1999), which earned her a second Golden Globe nomination, and in Oliver Stone's sports drama Any Given Sunday (1999).

Diaz would continue appearing in high-profile films in the early-2000s such as Charlie's Angels (2000) and its sequel, Charlie's Angels: Full Throttle (2003), as well as voicing Princess Fiona in the Shrek franchise (2001– present). She also co-starred with Selma Blair and Christina Applegate in the romantic comedy (2000) "The Sweetest Thing". She would gain two additional Golden Globe Award nominations for Best Supporting Actress for her roles in Cameron Crowe's Vanilla Sky (2001) and Martin Scorsese's period film Gangs of New York (2002).

In the late-2000s and early-2010s, Diaz continued to star in numerous comedies such as What Happens in Vegas (2008), Bad Teacher (2011), and What to Expect When You're Expecting (2012). She also starred in the psychological horror film The Box (2009) and the big-budget action film The Green Hornet (2011). Diaz had a supporting role in Ridley Scott's crime thriller The Counselor (2013), followed by a lead role in the comedy Sex Tape (2014) and the musical-comedy Annie (2014), an adaptation of the Broadway musical of the same name. After her appearance in Annie, Diaz announced in 2018 that she had formally retired from acting. In 2025, she came out of retirement to join the Netflix action-comedy Back in Action.

== Film ==
Year	Title	Role	Notes
1994	The Mask	Tina Carlyle	
1995	The Last Supper	Jude	
1996	She's the One	Heather Davis	
1996	Feeling Minnesota	Freddie Clayton	
1996	Head Above Water	Nathalie	
1997	Keys to Tulsa	Trudy	
1997	My Best Friend's Wedding	Kimmy Wallace	
1997	A Life Less Ordinary	Celine Naville	
1998	Fear and Loathing in Las Vegas	TV reporter	Cameo
1998	There's Something About Mary	Mary Jensen	
1998	Welcome to Hollywood	Herself	
1998	Very Bad Things	Laura Garrety	
1999	Being John Malkovich	Lotte Schwartz	
1999	Any Given Sunday	Christina Pagniacci	
2000	Things You Can Tell Just by Looking at Her	Carol Faber	
2000	Charlie's Angels	Natalie Cook	
2001	The Invisible Circus	Faith	
2001	Shrek	Princess Fiona	Voice
2001	Vanilla Sky	Julie Gianni	
2002	The Sweetest Thing	Christina Walters	
2002	Gangs of New York	Jenny Everdeane	
2002	Slackers	Herself	Cameo
2002	Minority Report	Woman on train	Uncredited cameo
2003	Charlie's Angels: Full Throttle	Natalie Cook	
2004	Shrek 2	Princess Fiona	Voice
2005	In Her Shoes	Maggie Feller	
2006	The Holiday	Amanda Woods	
2007	Shrek the Third	Princess Fiona	Voice
2008	What Happens in Vegas	Joy McNally	
2009	My Sister's Keeper	Sara Fitzgerald	
2009	The Box	Norma Lewis	
2010	Shrek Forever After	Princess Fiona	Voice
2010	Knight and Day	June Havens	
2011	The Green Hornet	Lenore Case	
2011	Bad Teacher	Elizabeth Halsey	
2012	What to Expect When You're Expecting	Jules Baxter	
2012	Gambit	PJ Puznowski	
2012	A Liar's Autobiography: The Untrue Story of Monty Python's Graham Chapman	Sigmund Freud	Voice
2013	The Counselor	Malkina	
2013	The Unbelievers	Herself	Documentary
2013	In a World...	Herself in trailer for The Amazon Games	Uncredited cameo
2014	The Other Woman	Carly Whitten	
2014	Sex Tape	Annie Hargrove	
2014	Annie	Miss Hannigan	
2025	Back in Action	Emily	
2026	Outcome	Kyle	
2026	Bad Day	Joy	Post-production
2027	Shrek 5	Princess Fiona	Voice; in production
TBA	Untitled Stephen Merchant film		Post-production

== Television ==
Year	Title	Role	Notes
1998–2014	Saturday Night Live	Herself	Host; 4 episodes
2005	Trippin'	Herself	10 episodes; also executive producer
2007	Shrek the Halls	Princess Fiona	Voice; TV special
2009	Sesame Street	Herself	3 episodes
2010	Top Gear	Herself	Guest in 'Star in a Reasonably Priced Car' segment; Series 15, Episode 5
2010	Scared Shrekless	Princess Fiona	Voice; TV special
2014	Bad Teacher	—N/a	Producer; 13 episodes
2022	RuPaul's Drag Race All Stars	Herself	Guest judge (season 7); episode: "Legends"

== Video games ==
Year	Title	Voice role	Notes
2003	Charlie's Angels	Natalie Cook	

== Theme parks ==
Year	Title	Voice role
2003	Shrek 4-D	Princess Fiona

== See also ==
- List of awards and nominations received by Cameron Diaz
