= Teen Choice Award for Choice Movie Actress – Comedy =

Entertainment award category

The following is a list of the Teen Choice Award winners and nominees for Choice Movie Actress – Comedy.

== Winners and nominees ==
=== 2000s ===
Year	Winner	Nominees	Ref.
2002	Sarah Michelle Gellar – Scooby-Doo	Selma Blair – The Sweetest Thing Cameron Diaz – The Sweetest Thing Anne Hathaway – The Princess Diaries Gwyneth Paltrow – Shallow Hal Christina Ricci – Pumpkin Winona Ryder – Mr. Deeds Reese Witherspoon – The Importance of Being Earnest	
2003	Queen Latifah – Bringing Down the House	Jennifer Aniston – Bruce Almighty Sandra Bullock – Two Weeks Notice Hilary Duff – The Lizzie McGuire Movie Kate Hudson – How to Lose a Guy in 10 Days Jennifer Lopez – Maid in Manhattan Brittany Murphy – Just Married Reese Witherspoon – Sweet Home Alabama	
2004	Lindsay Lohan – Mean Girls	Drew Barrymore – 50 First Dates Kate Bosworth – Win a Date with Tad Hamilton! Jennifer Garner – 13 Going on 30 Alyson Hannigan – American Wedding Kate Hudson – Raising Helen Queen Latifah – Barbershop 2: Back in Business Rachel McAdams – Mean Girls	
2005	Sandra Bullock – Miss Congeniality 2: Armed and Fabulous	Drew Barrymore – Fever Pitch Hilary Duff – A Cinderella Story Queen Latifah – Beauty Shop Lindsay Lohan – Herbie: Fully Loaded Jennifer Lopez – Monster-in-Law Eva Mendes – Hitch Amanda Peet – A Lot Like Love	
2006	Rachel McAdams – Wedding Crashers and The Family Stone	Jennifer Aniston – The Break-Up Hilary Duff – The Perfect Man and Cheaper by the Dozen 2 Queen Latifah – Last Holiday Lindsay Lohan – Just My Luck Sarah Jessica Parker – Failure to Launch	
2007	Sophia Bush – John Tucker Must Die	Katherine Heigl – Knocked Up Kate Hudson – You, Me & Dupree Emma Roberts – Nancy Drew Jessica Simpson – Employee of the Month	
2008	Elliot Page (Note: Credited as Ellen Page) – Juno	Amy Adams – Enchanted Kristen Bell – Forgetting Sarah Marshall Cameron Diaz – What Happens in Vegas Sarah Jessica Parker – Sex and the City	
2009	Anne Hathaway – Bride Wars	Amy Adams – Night at the Museum: Battle of the Smithsonian Jennifer Aniston – Marley and Me and He's Just Not That Into You Isla Fisher – Confessions of a Shopaholic Kate Hudson – Bride Wars	

=== 2010s ===
Year	Winner	Nominees	Ref.
2010	Tina Fey – Date Night	Kristen Bell – Couples Retreat Lizzy Caplan – Hot Tub Time Machine Zoe Saldaña – Death at a Funeral Emma Stone – Zombieland	
2011	Cameron Diaz – Bad Teacher	Anna Faris – Take Me Home Tonight Eva Mendes – The Other Guys Maya Rudolph – Bridesmaids Kristen Wiig – Bridesmaids	
2012	Emma Stone – Crazy, Stupid, Love	Cameron Diaz – What to Expect When You're Expecting Alyson Hannigan – American Reunion Jennifer Lopez – What to Expect When You're Expecting Reese Witherspoon – This Means War	
2013	Rebel Wilson – Pitch Perfect	Anna Kendrick – Pitch Perfect Melissa McCarthy – Identity Thief Kerry Washington – Peeples Olivia Wilde – The Incredible Burt Wonderstone	
2014	Emma Roberts – We're the Millers	Christina Applegate – Anchorman 2: The Legend Continues Drew Barrymore – Blended Zoey Deutch – Vampire Academy Cameron Diaz – The Other Woman	
2015	Anna Kendrick – Pitch Perfect 2	Raini Rodriguez – Paul Blart: Mall Cop 2 Emma Stone – Aloha Mae Whitman – The Duff Rebel Wilson – Pitch Perfect 2 Reese Witherspoon – Hot Pursuit	
2016	Chloë Grace Moretz – Neighbors 2: Sorority Rising	Jennifer Aniston – Mother's Day Anne Hathaway – The Intern Anna Kendrick – Mr. Right Melissa McCarthy – The Boss Nicki Minaj – Barbershop: The Next Cut	
2017	Ellen DeGeneres – Finding Dory	Alexandra Daddario – Baywatch Gal Gadot – Keeping Up with the Joneses Jennifer Hudson – Sandy Wexler Tori Kelly – Sing Anna Kendrick – Table 19	
2018	Anna Kendrick – Pitch Perfect 3	Anna Faris – Overboard Karen Gillan – Jumanji: Welcome to the Jungle Amy Schumer – I Feel Pretty Hailee Steinfeld – Pitch Perfect 3 Rebel Wilson – Pitch Perfect 3	
2019	Laura Marano – The Perfect Date	Awkwafina – Crazy Rich Asians Tiffany Haddish – Night School Marsai Martin – Little Rebel Wilson – Isn't It Romantic Constance Wu – Crazy Rich Asians	
