= Poorna =

Poorna may refer to:

== People ==
- Shamna Kasim, Indian actress also known as Poorna
- Poorna Bell, British journalist and author
- Poorna Jagannathan, Indian-American actress
- Malavath Purna (also spelt Poorna), Indian mountaineer

== Other ==
- Poorna: Courage Has No Limit, a 2017 Indian film
- Poorna Express, an express train in India

== See also ==
- Purna (disambiguation)
- Purnima (disambiguation)
