= Purnima (disambiguation) =

Purnima (also Poornima or Pournima), meaning "full moon" in Sanskrit.

Purnima may also refer to:

== Persons with the given name ==
- Purnima (Hindi actress) (1934–2013), Indian actress
- Poornima (Telugu actress), Indian actress mid 1980s
- Poornima (singer) (1960), Bollywood playback singer
- Purnima (Bangladeshi actress) (1981), Bangladeshi actress
- Purnima Banerjee (1911–1951), Indian freedom activist
- Poornima Bhagyaraj (born 1960), Indian film actress
- Purnima Choudhary (born 1971), Indian cricketer
- Purnima Devi (1884–1972), Indian educator
- Poornima Indrajith, Indian actress and television presenter
- Purnima Mahato, Indian archer and archery coach
- Poornima Arvind Pakvasa (1913–2016), Indian social worker
- Purnima Rau (born 1967), Indian cricketer
- Purnima Mane, Indian author and global health expert
- Purnima Shrestha, Nepalese mountaineer and photojournalist

== Other uses ==
- Purnima (film), a 1965 Hindi film starring Dharmendra, Meena Kumari and Mehmood
- Purnimaa - 2023 Television series aired on Dangal TV

== See also ==
- Purna (disambiguation)
- Poorna (disambiguation)
- Pournami (disambiguation)
- Poonam (disambiguation)
- Punnami Naagu (disambiguation)
- Purnam Allahabadi, Pakistani Urdu-language poet
- Purnamasi Jani, Indian social worker
- Poornam Viswanathan, Indian actor
- Poornamadah, track from the 1997 studio album Chants of India by Ravi Shankar
- Poornamma, poem from the 1910 Telugu poetry collection Mutyala Saralu by Indian writer Gurajada Apparao
