= The Body Book =

2013 health book

The Body Book: Feed, Move, Understand and Love Your Amazing Body
- First edition
- Authors: Sandra Bark, Cameron Diaz
- Language: English
- Publisher: HarperCollins
- Publication date: December 31, 2013
- Pages: 288

The Body Book: Feed, Move, Understand and Love Your Amazing Body is a 2013 health book co-written by Sandra Bark and actress Cameron Diaz. It was a New York Times Bestseller.

== Content ==
The book takes a scientific approach. It cites articles from the following peer-reviewed academic journals: the American Journal of Preventive Medicine, JAMA: The Journal of the American Medical Association, Archives of Internal Medicine, Medicine & Science in Sports & Exercise, The Lancet, Sleep, Diabetes Care, Diabetes Research and Clinical Practice, and the Journal of Applied Physiology.

It is divided into three sections: nutrition, fitness, and mind/body awareness. It looks at vitamins and minerals, muscle mass and bone strength. It suggests eating unprocessed, whole foods making gradual changes, and working out to sweat every day.

The book does not offer a diet or workout plan, but gives the basic information about having a healthy body. However, it suggests preparing the week's meals in advance every Sunday.

== Critical reception ==
The book was Number 2 on The New York Times Bestseller List in March 2014.

Writing for The Daily Beast, Abby Haglage said, "the book read[s] like a 400-page endorphin-induced love letter." She added it was "a positive message worth exploring." However, she suggested the book was written in "a slightly moronic" style and that it came "with a cringe—or two".

To the contrary, Poorna Bell of The Huffington Post praised her "genuinely likeable style," adding "you don't get the feeling you're being preached at." She argued that Cameron's use of anecdotes to introduce her pearls of wisdom was a good stylistic device. At the same time, she wondered "if this was edited properly," adding, "At certain points the book reads like it is an excerpt from Diaz's own diary (there are caps, exclamation points and italics galore) and this can get a bit wearing." She also questioned the usefulness of long scientific explanations.

In The Christian Science Monitor, Lisa Suhay praised the book for its acceptance of women's imperfect bodies.
