= Pournami =

Pournami may refer to:

- Pournami (film), a 2006 Indian Telugu-language film
- Pournami (TV series), a 2018–2021 Indian Telugu-language soap opera

== See also ==
- Starring Pournami, an unreleased Indian Malayalam-language film
- Purnima (disambiguation)
- Poonam (disambiguation)
- Punnami Naagu (disambiguation)
