= Arughat Rural Municipality =

Arughat Rural Municipality आरुघाट गाउँपालिका
- Gaunpalika
- Location in Nepal
- Coordinates: 28.048200°N 84.813770°E
- Country: Nepal
- Province: Gandaki
- District: Gorkha District

Area
  - Total: 148.5 km^{2} (57.3 sq mi)

Population
  - Total: 23,887
  - Density: 160.9/km^{2} (416.6/sq mi)
- Time zone: UTC+5:45 (Nepal Time)
- Website: http://aarughatmun.gov.np/

Arughat Rural Municipality (Nepali :आरूघाट गाँउपालिका) is a Gaunpalika in Gorkha District in Gandaki Province of Nepal. It is divided into 10 wards. On 12 March 2017, the government of Nepal implemented a new local administrative structure, with the implementation of the new local administrative structure, VDCs have been replaced with municipal and Village Councils. Arughat is one of these 753 local units.

== Demographics ==
At the time of the 2011 Nepal census, Arughat Rural Municipality had a population of 23,915. Of these, 71.5% spoke Nepali, 21.4% Gurung, 3.1% Tamang, 1.3% Newar, 1.0% Bajjika, 1.0% Ghale, 0.3% Magar, 0.1% Bhojpuri, 0.1% Rai, 0.1% Urdu and 0.1% other languages as their first language.

In terms of ethnicity/caste, 31.3% were Gurung, 15.0% Chhetri, 9.9% Hill Brahmin, 8.4% Brahmu/Baramo, 7.8% Magar, 6.3% Kami, 5.5% Sarki, 5.0% Newar, 3.3% Ghale, 3.2% Tamang, 2.3% Damai/Dholi, 0.5% Darai, 0.4% Musalman, 0.2% Gharti/Bhujel, 0.2% Majhi, 0.2% Sanyasi/Dasnami, 0.1% Rai, 0.1% Thakuri and 0.3% others.

In terms of religion, 64.7% were Hindu, 28.9% Buddhist, 4.2% Christian, 1.5% Prakriti, 0.4% Muslim and 0.3% others.

In terms of literacy, 60.3% could both read and write, 2.3% could read but not write and 37.4% could neither read nor write.

== Notable people ==
- Purnima Shrestha, mountaineer and photojournalist.

== Climate ==
Climate data for Arughat Bazar, elevation 518 m (1,699 ft)
Month	Jan	Feb	Mar	Apr	May	Jun	Jul	Aug	Sep	Oct	Nov	Dec	Year
Mean daily maximum °C (°F)	21.1 (70.0)	24.2 (75.6)	28.7 (83.7)	33.4 (92.1)	34.2 (93.6)	32.4 (90.3)	30.8 (87.4)	30.7 (87.3)	30.3 (86.5)	29.7 (85.5)	25.7 (78.3)	21.8 (71.2)	28.6 (83.5)
Daily mean °C (°F)	15.6 (60.1)	17.6 (63.7)	22.1 (71.8)	26.2 (79.2)	27.6 (81.7)	27.7 (81.9)	27.0 (80.6)	26.7 (80.1)	26.2 (79.2)	24.3 (75.7)	19.7 (67.5)	16.0 (60.8)	23.1 (73.5)
Mean daily minimum °C (°F)	10.1 (50.2)	11.0 (51.8)	15.5 (59.9)	19.0 (66.2)	21.0 (69.8)	23.0 (73.4)	23.2 (73.8)	22.8 (73.0)	22.1 (71.8)	19.0 (66.2)	13.8 (56.8)	10.1 (50.2)	17.6 (63.6)
Average precipitation mm (inches)	25.1 (0.99)	29.4 (1.16)	51.4 (2.02)	77.2 (3.04)	172.4 (6.79)	430.9 (16.96)	666.9 (26.26)	637.4 (25.09)	353.4 (13.91)	69.1 (2.72)	13.3 (0.52)	13.3 (0.52)	2,539.8 (99.98)
Source: FAO JICA
