= Punnami Naagu =

Punnami Naagu (lit. 'full moon day') may refer to:

- Punnami Naagu (1980 film), an Indian Telugu-language horror drama film
- Punnami Naagu (2009 film), a Telugu-language female-centric horror film

== See also ==
- Pournami (disambiguation)
- Purnima (disambiguation)
- Poonam (disambiguation)
