= MTV Movie Award for Best Dance Sequence =

The following is a list of the MTV Movie Award winners and nominees for Best Dance Sequence. It was first introduced in 1995. This award was last given out in 2004.

Year	Actor(s) Movie	Nominees
1995	John Travolta and Uma Thurman —Pulp Fiction (Quentin Tarantino)	Jim Carrey and Cameron Diaz - The Mask (Chuck Russell); Christopher Daniel Barnes, Christine Taylor, Paul Sutera, Jennifer Elise Cox, Jesse Lee and Olivia Hack - The Brady Bunch Movie (Betty Thomas); Arnold Schwarzenegger and Tia Carrere - True Lies (James Cameron)
1998	Mike Myers and Londoners —Austin Powers: International Man of Mystery (Jay Roach)	Robert Carlyle, Mark Addy, William Snape, Tom Wilkinson, Steve Huison, Paul Barber and Hugo Speer - The Full Monty (Peter Cattaneo); Cameron Diaz and Ewan McGregor - A Life Less Ordinary (Danny Boyle); Mark Wahlberg - Boogie Nights (Paul Thomas Anderson); Lisa Kudrow, Mira Sorvino and Alan Cumming - Romy and Michele's High School Reunion (David Mirkin)
2001	Cameron Diaz —Charlie's Angels (McG)	Kirsten Dunst, Lindsay Sloane, Clare Kramer, Nicole Bilderback, Tsianina Joelson, Rini Bell, Bianca Kajlich, Nathan West and Huntley Ritter - Bring It On (Peyton Reed); Jamie Bell and Julie Walters - Billy Elliot (Stephen Daldry); Julia Stiles and Sean Patrick Thomas - Save the Last Dance (Thomas Carter)
2004	Seann William Scott —American Wedding (Jesse Dylan)	Drew Barrymore, Cameron Diaz and Lucy Liu - Charlie's Angels: Full Throttle (McG); Steve Martin - Bringing Down the House (Adam Shankman); Omarion, Marques Houston and the Lil' Saint's Dance Crew - You Got Served (Chris Stokes); Jennifer Aniston and Ben Stiller - Along Came Polly (John Hamburg)
