= Poonam =

- Gender: Unisex
- Language: Hindi; Sanskrit

Origin
- Meaning: "full moon"
- Region of origin: India

Other names
- Alternative spelling: Punam

Poonam or Punam (Hindi: पूनम) is a Hindu/Sanskrit Indian predominantly feminine given name, which means "full moon". Notable people with the name include:

== Poonam ==
- Poonam Bajwa (born 1989), Indian actress and model
- Poonam Dhillon (born 1962), Indian actress
- Poonam Joshi (born 1970), Indian actress
- Poonam Kaur (born 1986), Indian actress and model
- Poonam Kishore Saxena (born 1953), Indian IRS officer
- Poonam Mahajan Rao (born 1980), Indian politician and member of Parliament from Mumbai North Central
- Poonam Pandey (born 1991), Indian actress and model
- Poonam Sinha (born 1949), Indian actress
- Poonam Chand Vishnoi (1924–2006), Indian politician, Speaker of the Rajasthan Legislative Assembly 1980–1985

== Punam ==
- Punam Anand Keller, American economist and professor of Management
- Punam Barla (born 1995), Indian field hockey player
- Punam Patel, American actress
- Punam Raut (born 1989), Indian cricketer
- Punam Reddy, Indian tennis player
- Punam Suri, Indian educator, journalist and editor
- Punam Yadav (born 1995), Indian weightlifter

== See also ==
- Purnima (disambiguation)
- Punnami Naagu (disambiguation)
- Poonam Ki Raat, a 1965 film directed by Kishore Sahu
- Poonam (1981 film), directed by Harmesh Malhotra starring Poonam Dhillon
- Punam, 2006 Serbian documentary film
- Pūnam, village in Iran
