= Punam =

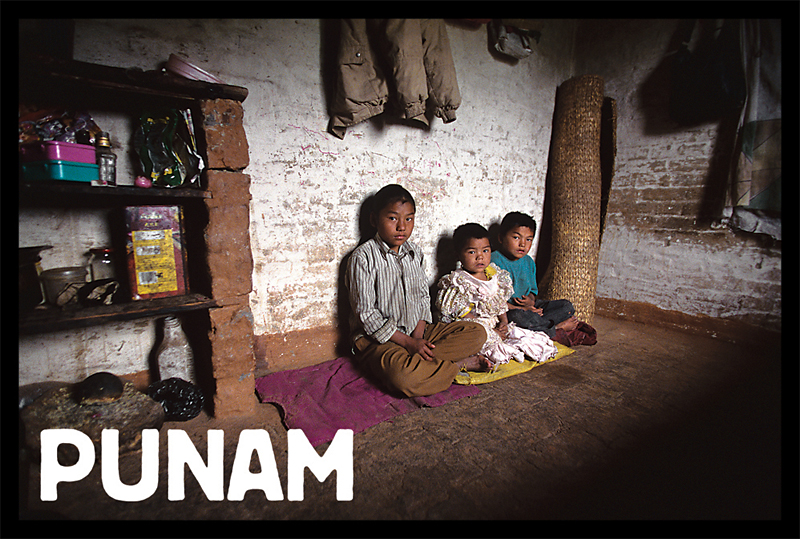
- Directed by: Natasa Urban, Lucian Muntean
- Produced by: Natasa Urban, Lucian Muntean
- Starring: Punam Tamang
- Narrated by: Punam Tamang
- Cinematography: Lucian Muntean
- Edited by: Natasa Urban
- Music by: Vladimir Moritz
- Distributed by: Seventh Art Releasing; Illumina Films
- Release date: March 2006
- Running time: 27 minutes
- Country: Serbia
- Languages: Nepali and Tamang

Punam is a 2006 documentary film about nine-year-old girl Punam Tamang from Bhaktapur, Nepal. It was directed and produced by Natasa Urban and Lucian Muntean (aka Lunam Docs), a Serbian independent documentary production duo specializing in telling the stories of working children.

== Synopsis ==
The child's voice of nine-year-old Punam Tamang transports us to the city of Bhaktapur in Nepal. There we are presented with a stark description of the hard life of this young girl and the dismal social conditions in which she lives. Punam's mother died when she was only five. She was left with her father, her newborn sister Rabina and her two-year-old brother Krishna. The Tamang children see little of their father because he works from sunrise to sundown in a rice factory, in order to earn enough money for their school fees (US$1.50 per month/student), and so during the daytime Punam assumes the roles of head of the family, caregiver and homemaker.

The film also takes us into the world of Punam's friends whose families do not make enough money to afford the school fee. Instead of studying, these children have to work in a stone quarry or brick-making factory to help their families get by. The film captures the hard work the children are required to perform and also takes a peek into the poor five-grade school that represents Punam's symbol of hope. She believes that education ushers in progress and is the only opportunity for improving their situation – perhaps bringing about new job opportunities in better conditions. We look at the situation through the eyes of this young Asian girl, who dreams of becoming a teacher and helping other children in situations like hers.

== Activism ==
The PUNAM FUND, a non-profit organisation, founded by Natasa Urban and Lucian Muntean, was established in September 2007 as a result of the enormous positive feedback regarding the documentary film Punam, which inspired people from all over the world to help the children presented in the film. The PUNAM FUND is dedicated to the elimination of and fight against child labour. For the time being, the activities of the PUNAM FUND are aimed at the children featured in the films Punam and Journey of a Red Fridge. Its main goal is to reduce the number of illiterate working children by providing scholarships for the children who work in stone quarries, brick kilns and carpet factories in the Bhaktapur region and for child porters working in Himalayan Mountains of Nepal.

== Alternate Titles ==
- Große Schwester Punam (Germany, Austria & Switzerland TV title; 3sat)
- Dotknij życia - Punam (Poland TV title; TVP)
- Punam - tyttö ilman lapsuutta (Finland TV title; YLE)
- Punam fra Nepal (Denmark TV title; DR)

== Exhibition & Awards ==
Alternate film poster for Punam

Punam premiered at the 2006 One World Film Festival, Prague, Czech Republic. Since then, Punam has been screened at more than 50 international festivals and received 8 awards, one of them the UNICEF Award for Children Rights.

In 2006, Punam was voted the most popular film among teachers in the Czech Republic. Punam was offered, for educational purposes, to more than 250 primary and secondary schools. About 10,000 children had the opportunity to view the documentary film Punam and debate on child labour issues. What is more, Human Rights Watch included it into its High School Program in the United States.

On 10 December 2006, on the occasion of the International Human Rights Day, Punam was screened at the UN Headquarters in New York City.

Punam was released on DVD in March 2009.

== Sequel ==
In March 2009, Natasa Urban and Lucian Muntean (Lunam Docs) returned to Bhaktapur, Nepal for the shooting of Punam sequel. This documentary was produced in association with The Global Fund for Children.
