= Purna (disambiguation) =

Purna is a town in Parbhani district in the Indian state of Maharashtra.

Purna may also refer to:

- Purna River (tributary of Godavari), a river of Maharashtra, India
- Purna River (tributary of Tapti), a river of Maharashtra, India
  - Purna Dam, an earthfill dam on the Purna River near Amravati District, Maharashtra
- Purna River (Gujarat), a river of Gujarat, India
- Punna or Pūrṇa Maitrāyanīputra, Buddhist arhat (awakened being) and one of the principal disciples of the Buddha

== See also ==
- Poorna (disambiguation)
- Purnima (disambiguation)
