= Trippin' (American TV series) =

- A shot of the opening sequence.
- Starring: Cameron Diaz
- Country of origin: United States
- Original language: English
- No. of episodes: 10

Production
- Executive producer: Cameron Diaz
- Running time: 26 minutes

Original release
- Network: MTV
- Release: March 28 – May 30, 2005

Trippin is a 2005 MTV environmental documentary television series hosted by Cameron Diaz. It also features many other celebrities, including Drew Barrymore, Redman, Jessica Alba, Eva Mendes, Mark Hoppus and Justin Timberlake. On the show, said celebrities visit various ecological locales around the world, in particular places of extraordinary beauty, such as the US, Chile, Costa Rica or Nepal.
