= Journey of a Red Fridge =

- Directed by: Natasa Urban, Lucian Muntean
- Produced by: Natasa Urban, Lucian Muntean
- Starring: Hari Rai
- Cinematography: Lucian Muntean
- Edited by: Natasa Urban
- Production company: The Global Fund for Children
- Distributed by: Cinema Guild; Illumina Films
- Release date: November 2007 (IDFA)
- Running time: 52 minutes
- Country: Serbia
- Languages: Nepali and Thulung Rai

Journey of a Red Fridge is a 2007 documentary film about 17-year-old porter Hari Rai working in the Himalayan Mountains of Nepal. It was directed and produced by Natasa Urban and Lucian Muntean (aka Lunam Docs), a Serbian independent documentary production duo specializing in telling the stories of working children. Journey of a Red Fridge was produced in association with The Global Fund for Children.

== Synopsis ==
Journey of a Red Fridge is a story of a 17-year-old boy named Hari Rai, who lives in a small village in the Himalayan Mountains of Nepal. Hari is a student. However, he also works as a porter so that he could pay for his tuition and cover his living expenses. Although very young, he already has three years of experience carrying loads up and down the mountain, mostly tourists' backpacks. This time, he gets a job to carry a huge red refrigerator from the top of the mountain, to the nearest town.

The audience follows Hari Rai on his journey through the Himalayan landscapes, alongside Hari’s inner life, his thoughts, hopes and dreams and also get to know the culture and the local people’s way of life in this region.

The film depicts Hari's attempts to gain an education, as out of 60,000 child porters in Nepal, he is one of the few to have a chance of going to school.

== Alternate titles ==
- Die Reise des roten Kühlschranks (Austria TV title; ORF)
- Die Reise des roten Kühlschranks (Germany TV title; ARTE)
- Les tribulations d'un frigo rouge (France TV title; ARTE)
- Punainen jääkaappi (Finland TV title; YLE)
- Putovanje crvenog frižidera (Serbia TV title)

== Exhibition and awards ==
Journey of a Red Fridge premiered at the 2007 IDFA Film Festival, Amsterdam, the Netherlands. Since then, Journey of a Red Fridge has been screened at more than 80 international festivals and received 24 awards.

Journey of a Red Fridge was released on DVD in March 2009.
