= Kate Upton =

American model and actress (born 1992)

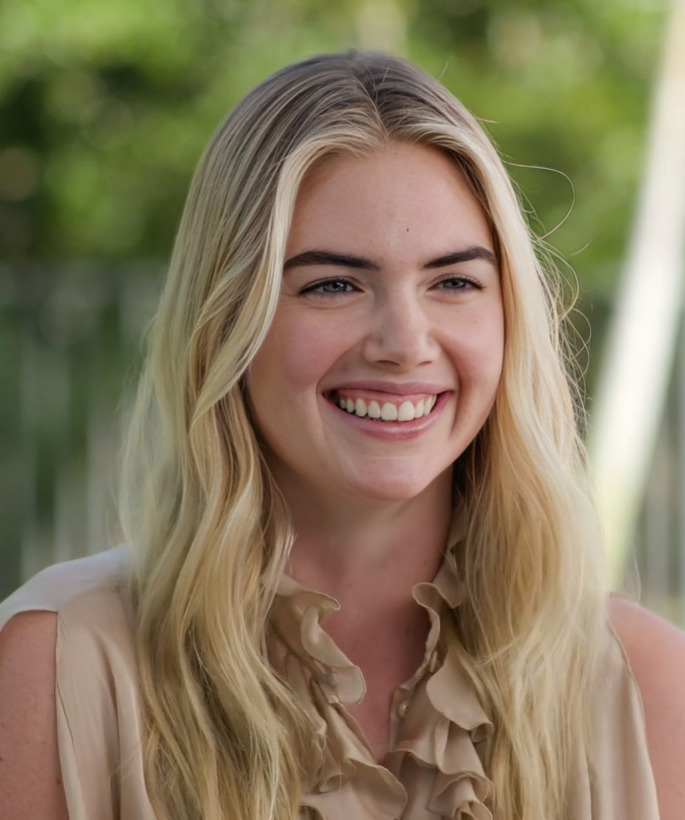
- Upton in 2021
- Born: Katherine Elizabeth Upton; June 10, 1992 (age 34); St. Joseph, Michigan, U.S.
- Occupations: Model; actress
- Years active: 2008–present
- Spouse: Justin Verlander (m. 2017)
- Children: 2
- Relatives: Fred Upton (uncle)
- Modeling information
- Height: 5 ft 10 in (1.78 m)
- Hair color: Blonde
- Eye color: Blue/green
- Agency: The Lions

Katherine Elizabeth Upton (born June 10, 1992) is an American model and actress. She first appeared in the Sports Illustrated Swimsuit Issue in 2011, and was the cover model for the 2012, 2013, and 2017 issues. In addition, she was the subject of the 100th-anniversary Vanity Fair cover. Upton has also appeared in the films Tower Heist (2011), The Other Woman (2014), and The Layover (2017).

== Early life ==
Katherine Elizabeth Upton was born in St. Joseph, Michigan. She is the daughter of Shelley (née Davis), a former Texas state tennis champion, and Jeff Upton, a high school athletic director. Her uncle is former U.S. Representative Fred Upton. Upton's great-grandfather, Frederick Upton, was co-founder of appliance manufacturer and marketer Whirlpool Corporation.

In 1999, Upton moved with her family to Melbourne, Florida, where she was a student at Holy Trinity Episcopal Academy, a private Christian school, although she did not graduate.

As a young equestrian, she showed at the American Paint Horse Association (APHA) and competed at a national level. With her horse Roanie, she won three APHA Reserve World Championships – 13 and Under Western Riding, 13 and Under Horsemanship, and 14–18 Western Riding. She was named the 13 and Under Reserve All-Around Champion, giving her a total of four reserve championships (second place). In addition, Upton ended up third overall on the APHA youth Top 20. With a second horse, Colby, she won 14–18 Western Riding and was included in the top five in 14–18 Horsemanship and 14–18 Western Pleasure in 2009.

== Career ==
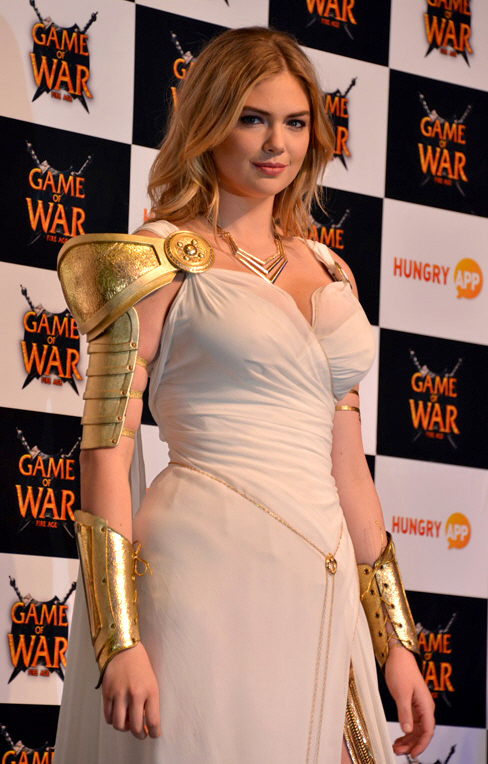
Upton at G-Star 2014

Upton attended a casting call in Miami for Elite Model Management in 2008 and was signed the same day. She eventually moved to New York City, where she then signed with IMG Models. Upton first modeled clothing for Garage and Dooney & Bourke. She was the 2010–11 face of Guess. In 2011, Upton appeared in the Sports Illustrated Swimsuit Issue. She was featured in the body paint section and named Rookie of the Year for the issue. She has since modeled for Beach Bunny Swimwear, and has appeared in Complex, as well as Esquire as "The Woman of the Summer". Upton wore one of the Beach Bunny suits in the 2014 Sports Illustrated Swimsuit Issue.

In April 2011, an Internet video of her doing the dougie hip-hop dance at a Los Angeles Clippers game went viral and served to increase her popularity. Guy Trebay of The New York Times observed that this served to illustrate the power of social media to bestow stardom upon a model, which had previously been the domain of top designer runway shows. In April 2012, Upton appeared in a video of herself performing the Cat Daddy dance to the song of the same name by The Rej3ctz, which also went viral.

Upton made an appearance in a June 2011 episode of Tosh.0 and participated in the 2011 Taco Bell All-Star Legends and Celebrity Softball Game at Chase Field in Phoenix, Arizona, in July 2011. Upton's acting debut was in the film, Tower Heist, as Mr. Hightower's mistress. It was released in November 2011. She also appeared in The Three Stooges as Sister Bernice.

In April 2012, she faced criticism for her raunchy portrayal the kind-hearted Sister Bernice, one of the sisters in the Sisters of Mercy Orphanage, in The Three Stooges, where according to Vanity Fair, towards the end of the film she emerges from a pool "in a nun habit, a rosary, and little else". The Catholic League criticised Upton's performance as "crudity", claiming that it was symptomatic of a willingness to "[trash] Christianity, especially Catholicism". However, the scene of Upton emerging from the pool in the revealing bikini only appears in the film's trailer. In the final film, her swimsuit only appears briefly in a couple of scenes.

Upton appeared on the cover of the 2012 Sports Illustrated Swimsuit Issue, released in February 2012. Upton has also recounted the negative aftereffects of the 2012 Sports Illustrated cover, as she was subjected to criticism and felt she had been objectified.

Upton has appeared in editorials for American, Italian, British, Spanish, German, and Brazilian Vogue, Harper's Bazaar, V, Mademoiselle, LOVE, Italian, German, and American GQ, Cosmopolitan, Glamour, and Esquire. She has appeared on the covers of Italian, American, and British Vogue, French and American Elle, American, Italian, and German GQ, Esquire, and Vanity Fair. She has appeared in advertising campaigns for David Yurman, Sam Edelman, Betsey Johnson, Guess, Victoria's Secret, Express, and Bare Necessities. She was named the "new face" of Bobbi Brown cosmetics in 2014.

In 2012, Upton was ranked the fifth-sexiest model by Models.com. She ranked number three on the American publication of AskMen's Top 99 Women for 2013. In 2012, she was listed on Maxim's Hot 100 list, citing her photo shoots with Sports Illustrated. Upton was the cover model for the 2013 Sports Illustrated Swimsuit Issue for the second consecutive year. Parts of her 2013 Sports Illustrated pictorial were filmed in Antarctica and Upton suffered from failing hearing and eyesight due to the extreme cold. After getting the November 2012 Vogue Italia cover photographed by Steven Meisel and the January 2013 Vogue UK cover, Upton landed the June 2013 Vogue cover by Mario Testino. She was then photographed by Annie Leibovitz for the October 2013 100th anniversary cover of Vanity Fair.

In September 2013, Upton was named Model of the Year at the 10th annual Style Awards at the Mercedes-Benz Fashion Week in New York City. Upton appeared on the flip-side cover of the 2014 50th-anniversary Sports Illustrated Swimsuit Issue, the first time that type of cover was used by that magazine. Part of her shoot took place at Cape Canaveral, capturing her in zero gravity. In April 2014, she appeared with Cameron Diaz, Leslie Mann, and Nikolaj Coster-Waldau in the comedy The Other Woman as Amber, one of Coster-Waldau's character's mistresses.

In 2014, Upton starred with Tony Hale in Lady Antebellum's music video "Bartender". People named Upton its Sexiest Woman for 2014, the first time the title has been awarded. Also in 2014, Upton was the centerpiece of a $40 million advertising campaign for Machine Zone's mobile app Game of War: Fire Age. In 2017, Upton starred with Alexandra Daddario in The Layover, a road trip sex comedy directed by William H. Macy. The film follows two best friends on vacation as they fight over the same man during a layover in St. Louis. Also that year, Upton filmed scenes in James Franco's film adaptation The Disaster Artist. Upton hosts fashion reality television show Dress My Tour, which premiered on Hulu in 2024.

== Personal life ==
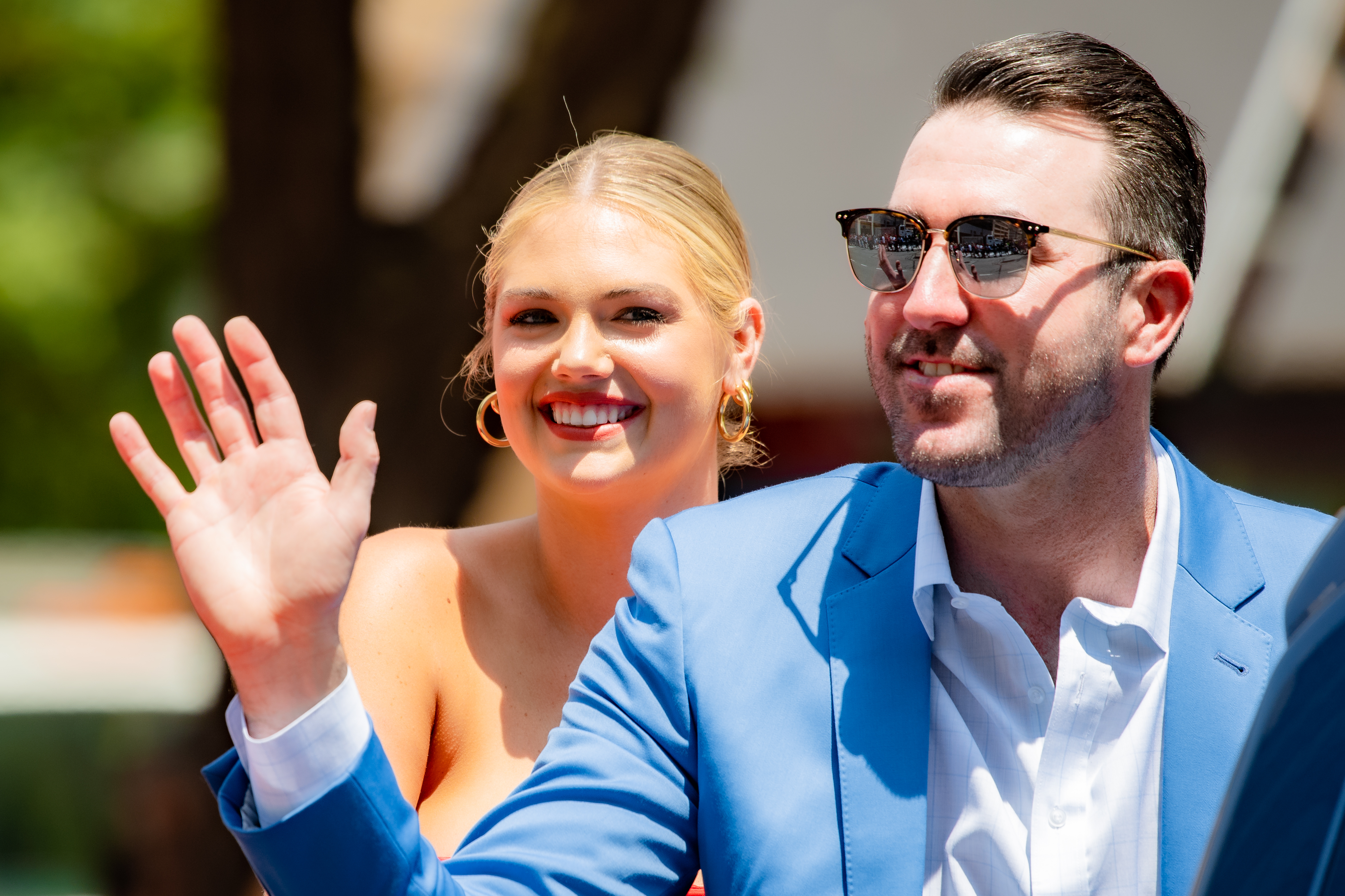
Upton and husband Justin Verlander in 2019

Upton is a committed Christian, who has been outspoken in defending her faith from critics who have suggested that her modeling career is incompatible with religious values.

During an interview with Elle magazine in 2013, she reflected on the importance of Christian faith to her life and career. Upton recalled an occasion during a photoshoot when someone joked about her cross necklace, saying "Why are you wearing a cross? Like you would be religious" and then removing the necklace from her for the shoot. She says the incident "really affected" her and galvanized her commitment to expressing her faith. As a result, she tattooed a cross on the inside of her finger so that she could have "a cross with me, at all times".

Upton started dating then-Detroit Tigers pitcher Justin Verlander in early 2014, and they were engaged in 2016. In 2017, the couple married in Tuscany, Italy. They have a daughter, Genevieve, born in 2018, and a son, Bellamy Brooks, born in 2025.

In 2014, nude photographs of Upton and several other female celebrities were illegally leaked to the Internet.

== Filmography ==
=== Film ===
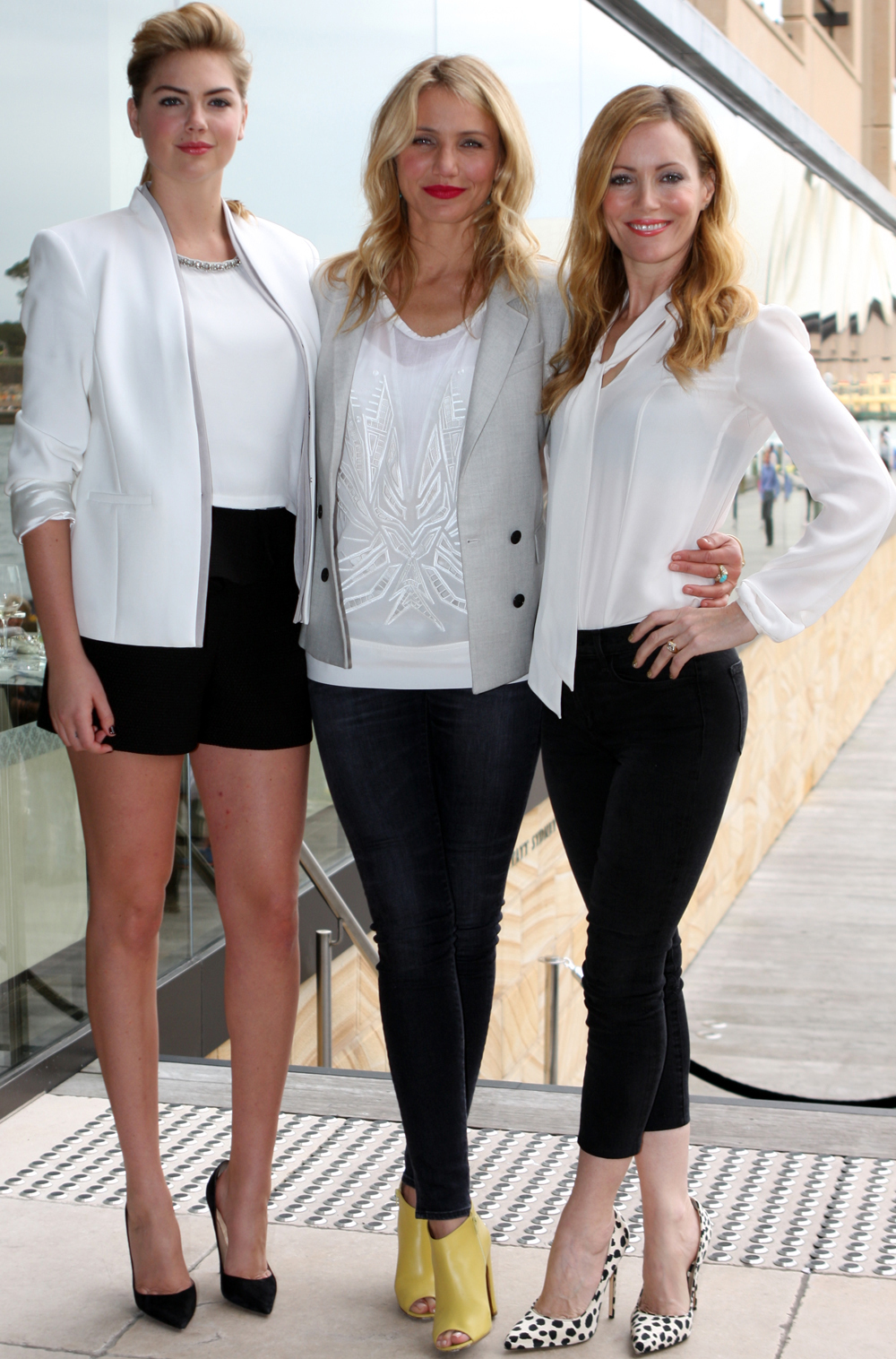
Upton (left) with her co-stars Cameron Diaz (middle) and Leslie Mann (right) in a promotional photo for The Other Woman (2014)

Year	Title	Role	Notes
2011	Tower Heist	Mr. Hightower's Mistress	Cameo
2012	The Three Stooges	Sister Bernice	
2014	The Other Woman	Amber	
2017	The Layover	Meg	
2017	The Disaster Artist	Herself	Scenes deleted
2019	Adult Interference	Talia	Previously known as Wild Man, shot in 2017
2024	Sweet Dreams	Kat	

=== Television ===
Year	Title	Role	Notes
2011	Tosh.0	Herself	Episode: "Bug in Mouth Reporter"
2012	Sports Illustrated: The Making of Swimsuit 2012	Herself	TV special; dated February 14
2012	Saturday Night Live	Herself	Episode: "Maya Rudolph/Sleigh Bells"
2012	GTTV Presents MLB 2K12: The Perfect Club	Herself	Episode dated May 24
2016	Barely Famous	Herself	Episode: "Love & Upton"
2017	Lip Sync Battle	Herself	Episode: "Ricky Martin vs. Kate Upton"
2017	Project Runway	Herself/Guest judge	Episode: "A "Little" Avant Garde"
2018	RuPaul's Drag Race	Herself/Guest judge	Episodes: "DragCon Panel Extravaganza", "Snatch Game"
2018	Robot Chicken	Unsinkable Molly Brown/Blonde Girl	Episode: "Your Mouth Is Hanging off Your Face"
2024	Dress My Tour	Herself/Host	9 episodes

=== Music videos ===
Year	Title	Role	Artist
2014	"Bartender"	Woman	Lady Antebellum

== Awards and nominations ==
Year	Awards	Category	Recipient	Result
2012	Teen Choice Awards	Choice Female Hottie	Herself	Nominated
2013	Style Awards	Model of the Year	Herself	Won
2014	People Magazine Awards	People's Sexiest Woman	Herself	Won
2014	Teen Choice Awards	Choice Movie: Chemistry (shared with Cameron Diaz and Leslie Mann)	The Other Woman	Nominated
2014	Young Hollywood Awards	Coolest Crossover Artist	Herself	Nominated
2014	Young Hollywood Awards	Hottest Body (of Work)	Herself	Nominated
2015	MTV Movie & TV Awards	Best Shirtless Performance	The Other Woman	Nominated

== See also ==
- Forbes list of the world's highest-paid models
