= Purnima Shrestha =

Nepalese mountaineer and photojournalist

Personal information
- Nationality: Nepali
- Born: Arughat, Gorkha, Nepal

Purnima Shrestha (Nepali: पूर्णिमा श्रेष्ठ) is a Nepalese mountaineer and photojournalist renowned for her achievements in high-altitude climbing. She is the first women to summit Mount Everest (Sagarmatha) three times within a single climbing season. Shrestha is also among the first Nepali women to successfully ascend Annapurna I and Dhaulagiri, two of the most challenging peaks in the Himalayas.

As of 2025, she has successfully climbed Mount Everest five times and has completed ascents of eight peaks above 8,000 meters, solidifying her status as one of Nepal's leading female high-altitude climbers.

== Early life ==
Shrestha was born in Arughat, Gorkha, Gandaki Province, Nepal. Growing up, she wanted to do "something big in life". Later she became a photojournalist. She is a member of the Photo Journalists’ (PJ) Club.

== Mountaineering ==
In 2017, Shrestha visited the Everest Base Camp to cover the Everest Marathon, she describes this event where she became attracted to the mountains. On 26 September 2017, Shrestha started her mountaineering career with Manaslu, the 8th-highest mountain in the world. Although she did not have any previous experience or training in mountaineering, Shrestha wanted her first climb to be on Mount Everest, but, after everyone told her to choose a smaller mountain she opted for Manaslu.

In 2018, she summited Mount Everest, her second eight-thousander. The next year, she climbed Ama Dablam. In 2021, Shrestha with six other women climbed the peak of Annapurna. They became the first Nepali women to reach the summit of Annapurna. For their climb, the team received various honours. In October 2021, Shrestha with Pasang Lhamu Sherpa Akita both became the first women to successfully climb Dhaulagiri, the seventh highest mountain in the world.
