= Poorna Bell =

English journalist and author (born 1980)

- Born: Poorna Devi Shetty; 5 December 1980 (age 45); Maidstone, Kent, England
- Education: Queen Mary University of London
- Years active: 2003–present
- Spouse: Rob Bell (m. 2011; died 2015)
- Website: www.poornabell.com

Poorna Devi Bell (née Shetty; born 5 December 1980) is an English journalist and author.

== Early life ==
Poorna Devi Shetty was born in Maidstone, Kent to Kannada South Indian parents Jaya and Ashok Shetty. Her older sister is science writer Priya Joi. Bell graduated with a degree in English from Queen Mary University of London in 2002.

== Career ==
Bell began her career in the 2000s as an editor for Asiana, then a commissioning editor for The London Paper and a launch features editor for Grazia India. She was also a contributor to the BBC Asian Network. Bell received a 2007 Women of the Future Award nomination in the Media category. After a stint as senior travel editor at MSN UK, Bell joined HuffPost in 2013, where she served as Executive Editor and Global Lifestyle Head until 2017. She has had columns in Marie Claire and The i Paper.

In the aftermath of her husband Rob's suicide, Bell penned him an open letter in HuffPost followed by a memoir and her debut non-fiction mental health book titled Chase the Rainbow, published in 2017 via Simon & Schuster. Bell reunited with Simon & Schuster for a follow-up in 2019 titled In Search of Silence. In Search of Silence was a 2019 Big Book winner, awarded by Hearst UK. Bell won the Rising Star Award at Stylist's inaugural Remarkable Women Awards.

Bell's third non-fiction book Stronger: Changing Everything I Knew About Women's Strength was published in spring 2021 via Bluebird (a Pan Macmillan imprint). The book advocates for "mental strength through fitness". Stronger won Sports Performance Book of the Year at the 2022 Sports Book Awards.

As announced in 2021, Century (a Penguin Books UK imprint) acquired the rights to publish Bell's debut fiction novel In Case of Emergency. Her second novel This is Fine followed in 2024, also via Century. Her next non-fiction book She Wanted More will be published by LEAP (a Bonnier Books imprint).

== Personal life ==
In 2011, she married New Zealand science journalist Rob Bell. Her husband died by suicide in May 2015. He had struggled with depression and drug addiction.

== Bibliography ==
=== Non-fiction ===
- Chase the Rainbow (2017)
- In Search of Silence (2019)
- Stronger: Changing Everything I Knew About Women's Strength (2021)
- She Wanted More (2026)

=== Novels ===
- In Case of Emergency (2022)
- This is Fine (2024)
