= Sex Tape (film) =

2014 film by Jake Kasdan

- Theatrical release poster
- Directed by: Jake Kasdan
- Screenplay by: Kate Angelo; Jason Segel; Nicholas Stoller
- Story by: Kate Angelo
- Produced by: Todd Black; Jason Blumenthal; Steve Tisch
- Starring: Cameron Diaz; Jason Segel; Rob Corddry; Ellie Kemper; Rob Lowe
- Cinematography: Tim Suhrstedt
- Edited by: Steve Edwards; Tara Timpone
- Music by: Michael Andrews
- Production companies: Columbia Pictures; MRC; LStar Capital; Escape Artists
- Distributed by: Sony Pictures Releasing
- Release date: July 18, 2014
- Running time: 94 minutes
- Country: United States
- Language: English
- Budget: $40 million
- Box office: $126.3 million

Sex Tape is a 2014 American sex comedy film directed by Jake Kasdan and written by Kate Angelo, Jason Segel, and Nicholas Stoller. Starring Segel, Cameron Diaz, Rob Corddry, Ellie Kemper, and Rob Lowe, the film follows a married couple who make a sex tape to spice up their relationship only to wake up the next morning to find that it has gone missing. This sparks a frantic search in an attempt to find it.

The film was produced by Columbia Pictures and was released on July 18, 2014. The film grossed $126 million worldwide, against a budget of $40 million and received generally negative reviews from critics.

== Plot ==
Jay and Annie Hargrove are a married couple who used to have sex at every opportunity. Now, after having two kids, they are rarely intimate.

Getting her mother to keep the kids overnight, the couple try roleplaying and try having sex in less orthodox parts of the house, but then Jay struggles to get an erection. So, Annie suggests making a sex tape and they film themselves having sex in every position listed in The Joy of Sex on his tablet.

When done, Annie asks Jay to delete the recording to be safe, but an application on the tablet ends up instead inadvertently synchronizing the video to several iPads he had given away over time. After failing to get it out of the cloud, they set out to get back all of the gifted iPads, leading to a series of awkward encounters and close calls.

The couple relatively easily manage to delete the video on both her mother's and their son's tablets. Their close friends, Robbie and Tess, invite them in and then Annie and Jay end up having to explain themselves. Their friends, without any real plans, tag along as they seek the tablets.

Their most challenging recovery of a tablet is from the house of Annie's potential boss, Hank Rosenbaum. Under the guise of seeking money for a charity, Annie distracts him while Jay searches the house for the tablet. In the process, she tries cocaine for the first time and Jay battles with Hank's German shepherd. In the end, Robbie and Tess are the ones who get it back.

After collecting the iPads and deleting the videos, their friend's son, Howard, threatens to upload a copy of their sex tape to YouPorn unless they give him $25,000. After failing to get the money, they break into the YouPorn headquarters and begin to destroy their web servers.

The couple's plan is quickly thwarted when an alarm sounds. The owner, his guards and his wife confront them and threaten to call the police. However, after explaining it was to protect their family, their two young children come out. The owner's wife convinces him to take pity on them, so he agrees not to do so in exchange for $15,000 to cover the damage. Removing their video, he explains that all they had to do to have a video removed was send him an email request to do so.

After they have deleted all videos, Howard comes over to the house and gives Jay the only remaining copy of the video on a USB flash drive. This is in exchange for being allowed to hang out with their son, Clive, since he is his only friend.

As the film comes to a close, Jay and Annie decide to watch the video once themselves. Afterwards, they take the USB flash drive and go outside to smash it with a hammer, blend it, burn it with fire, and bury the remains.

== Cast ==
- Cameron Diaz as Annie Hargrove
- Jason Segel as Jay Hargrove
- Rob Corddry as Robby Thompson
- Ellie Kemper as Tess Thompson
- Rob Lowe as Hank Rosenbaum, Annie's boss
- Nat Faxon as Max
- Nancy Lenehan as Linda
- Giselle Eisenberg as Nell Hargrove
- Harrison Holzer as Howard
- Sebastian Hedges Thomas as Clive Hargrove
- Randall Park as Edward
- Osmani Rodriguez as Principal Rodriguez
- Jack Black (uncredited cameo) as Lamont, the owner of YouPorn
- Jolene Blalock as Catalina, the wife of the owner of YouPorn
- Dave "Gruber" Allen as Mailman
- Kumail Nanjiani as Punit
- Artemis Pebdani as Kia

== Production ==
=== Development ===
Sony Pictures acquired the script in June 2011, which was based on an original story created by Kate Angelo. Nicholas Stoller was in early talks to direct but eventually backed out with Jake Kasdan instead directing the picture. Before Diaz signed on, Reese Witherspoon, Amy Adams, Emily Blunt, Rose Byrne, and Jennifer Garner were all considered for the female lead.

Principal photography began on September 12, 2013, in Newton, Massachusetts. Hank's house is situated in the western Greater Boston suburb of Weston.

== Release ==
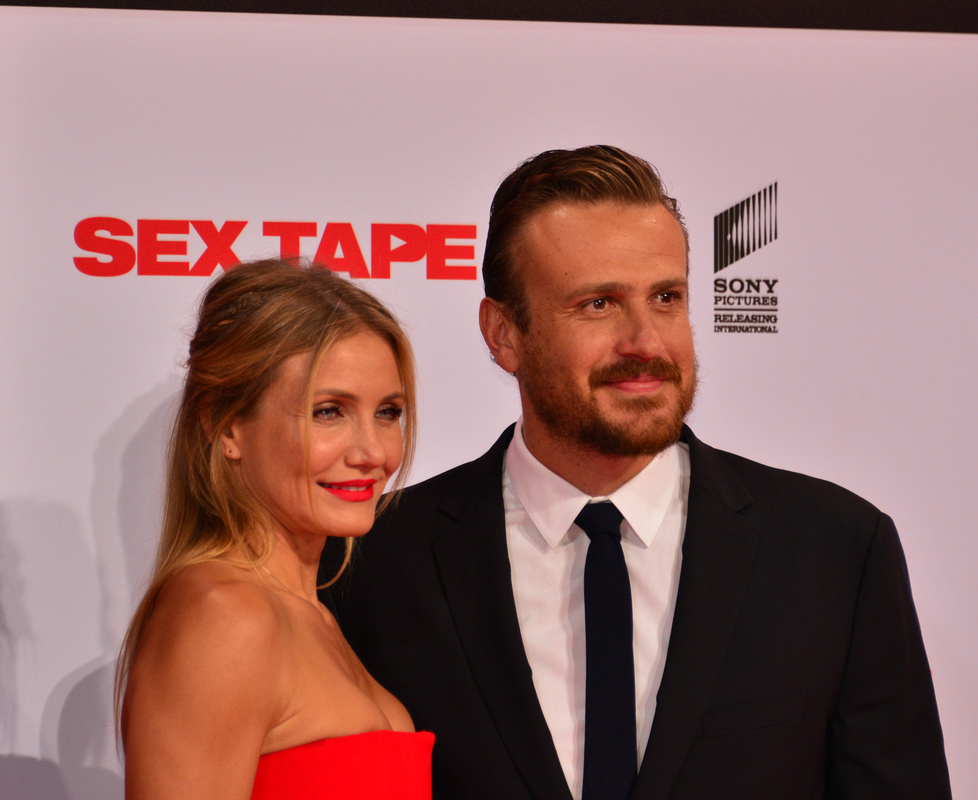
Diaz and Segel at the Berlin premiere of the film

On March 17, 2014, the first poster and some photos from the film were released, followed by a red band trailer on April 2, 2014, and a green band trailer on April 24, 2014. On June 5, Sony UK released an international trailer of the film.

On May 30, 2014, the film's release date was pushed up from July 25, 2014, to July 18.

On June 19, a final red band trailer was released, which was attached theatrically with the Melissa McCarthy comedy Tammy.

=== Indian censorship ===
The Examining Committee of the Central Board of Film Certification (CBFC) in India rejected its first version of the film. After some changes, they accepted the film and it was released in the country on August 29, 2014.

=== Box office ===
Sex Tape grossed $38.5 million in the United States and Canada, and $87.5 million in other territories, for a worldwide total of $126.3 million against a budget of $40 million.

The film was released in 2,457 theaters in North America and earned $5.7 million on its first day, including $1.1 million from Thursday night previews. In its opening weekend, the film grossed $14.6 million, finishing in fourth behind Dawn of the Planet of the Apes ($36.2 million), as well as newcomers The Purge: Anarchy ($29.8 million) and Planes: Fire & Rescue ($17.5 million).

The film topped the UK box office in its opening weekend with a gross of £1.43 million. It dropped to number 4 in its second week grossing £673,478. The film opened at #1 in markets like Bulgaria, Netherlands, Slovenia in their respective opening weekend. The biggest market in other territories being Germany, United Kingdom, Australia, where the film earned a gross of $12.14 million, $7.14 million and $6.9 million respectively.

=== Home media ===
Sex Tape was released on DVD and Blu-ray on October 21, 2014, by Sony Pictures Home Entertainment. DVD grossed $5,046,446 and Blu-ray grossed $2,308,984 in home video sales.

=== Critical response ===
Rotten Tomatoes, a review aggregator, reports that 16% of 157 surveyed reviews gave the film a positive review; the average rating is 4.1/10. The site's critical consensus reads, "With neither the conviction to embrace its smutty premise nor enough laughs to function as a worthwhile rom-com, the flaccid Sex Tape suffers from cinematic impotence." On Metacritic, the film has a score of 36 out of 100 based on 36 critics, indicating "generally unfavorable reviews". Audiences polled by CinemaScore gave the film an average grade of "C+" on an A+ to F scale.

Peter Bradshaw of The Guardian called the film "a timely naughty-but-nice romcom with too few laughs", giving it two out of five stars.

=== Accolades ===
Award	Date of Ceremony	Category	Recipient(s)	Result
Golden Raspberry Awards	February 21, 2015	Worst Actress	Cameron Diaz	Won (also for The Other Woman)
Golden Raspberry Awards	February 21, 2015	Worst Screen Combo	Cameron Diaz and Jason Segel	Nominated
Golden Raspberry Awards	February 21, 2015	Worst Screenplay	Kate Angelo, Jason Segel, and Nicholas Stoller	Nominated
