= The Other Woman (2014 film) =

2014 film by Nick Cassavetes

- Theatrical release poster
- Directed by: Nick Cassavetes
- Written by: Melissa K. Stack
- Produced by: Julie Yorn
- Starring: Cameron Diaz; Leslie Mann; Kate Upton; Nikolaj Coster-Waldau; Nicki Minaj; Taylor Kinney; Don Johnson
- Cinematography: Robert Fraisse
- Edited by: Alan Heim; Jim Flynn
- Music by: Aaron Zigman
- Production company: LBI Productions
- Distributed by: 20th Century Fox
- Release dates: March 31, 2014 (Amsterdam premiere); April 25, 2014 (United States)
- Running time: 109 minutes
- Country: United States
- Language: English
- Budget: $40 million
- Box office: $196.7 million

The Other Woman is a 2014 American romantic comedy film directed by Nick Cassavetes, written by Melissa K. Stack, and starring Cameron Diaz, Leslie Mann, Kate Upton, Nikolaj Coster-Waldau, Nicki Minaj, Taylor Kinney, and Don Johnson. The film follows three women—Carly (Diaz), Kate (Mann), and Amber (Upton)—who are all romantically involved with the same man (Coster-Waldau). After finding out about each other, the trio take their revenge on him.

Development of The Other Woman began in January 2012, when 20th Century Fox hired Stack to write the script, based on the original idea from the 1996 comedy The First Wives Club. Casting was done between November 2012 and June 2013. Filming began on April 29, 2013, in locations including Manhattan, Long Island, the Hamptons, Dockers Waterside Restaurant on Dune Road in Quogue, and the Bahamas, and it concluded on August 27 that year. Aaron Zigman composed the score and LBI Productions produced the film. The film was released on April 25, 2014, in the United States, and distributed worldwide by 20th Century Fox. The film received mostly negative reviews from critics, but was a box office success, grossing $196.7 million worldwide.

== Plot ==
Carly Whitten, a Manhattan attorney, has been dating handsome and charismatic businessman Mark King for two months. Carly plans to introduce Mark to her father Frank over dinner, but Mark cancels on them because of a "flood" at his Connecticut home. Encouraged by Frank, Carly dresses up in a sexy plumber's outfit and heads to Mark's house to seduce him. However, she is horrified to be met at the door by Mark's wife Kate, whom she had assumed to be Mark's housekeeper. Carly flees in embarrassment.

The next day, Kate unexpectedly shows up at Carly's law firm. Carly admits to a panicked Kate that Mark has been cheating on her, but assures her that she had no idea Mark was married. Initially annoyed by her constant presence at her apartment or work, Carly begins to warm up to Kate. When Kate discovers that Mark is seeing yet another woman, she suspects that Carly has secretly resumed her affair with Mark. The two argue before realizing that Mark is actually seeing a third woman, since both Carly and Kate have each been refusing to have sex with him.

Carly and Kate follow Mark to the Hamptons, where they stay at the house of Kate's brother Phil, who is immediately attracted to Carly. The duo find Mark with his mistress Amber, a young swimsuit supermodel, on the beach. When Mark leaves, they inform Amber that Mark has been cheating on all of them. Amber is shocked that Mark had lied to her, since he had claimed that Kate had cheated on him and that he was in the middle of divorcing her. All three women decide to exact revenge together by pulling pranks on him, including spiking his smoothies with estrogen pills, adding hair-removal cream to his shampoo, and lacing his water with laxatives.

The trio discovers Mark has been embezzling money from investors of various startup companies his workplace helps to develop. Meanwhile, Carly becomes romantically involved with Phil. The women's camaraderie begins to fall apart when Kate finds herself still in love with Mark after caving in and having sex with him. Carly exposes Mark's fraud before texting him, upsetting Kate and Amber. However, Kate later realizes that Mark has not changed after he catches a cold and suspects he has an STI (since Amber claimed she has one to avoid sleeping with him again) and he tries to trick her into taking medication for it too.

When Mark goes to the Bahamas on a supposed business trip, Kate decides to follow and expose him. She is joined by Carly and Amber, who explain that Mark has set up Kate as the owner of fake companies holding the embezzled money, which, if his fraud is discovered, would result in Kate going to prison rather than him. She also learns he has yet another mistress, whom he has met on this trip. This, and the possibility of facing prison, motivates her to take action, with the help of Carly's legal expertise. Amber confides to Carly that she is seeing someone else too.

Returning from the trip, Mark visits Carly at her office, only to find Kate, Carly, and Amber all sitting in the conference room together. The trio confronts him with his infidelities and embezzlement. With Carly as her attorney, Kate presents divorce papers and a list of their assets. She reveals how she, named CEO by Mark, has returned all of his embezzled money to the investors from whom it was stolen. While that saves Mark from jail time, it leaves him bankrupt, much to his shock and outrage. Mark's former business partner Nick fires him before acknowledging Kate's work. Everyone watches in amusement as an enraged Mark accidentally smashes into an empty room's glass paneling, severely injuring his nose. Exiting the building, he finds his car being towed away and is punched in the face by Frank.

A postscript states that Carly and Phil move in together and she becomes pregnant with his child. Kate takes over Mark's job with Nick, becoming CEO of several successful companies under her honest leadership. Frank is revealed as the man Amber is dating and the two travel the world together.

== Cast ==
- Cameron Diaz as Carly Whitten, an attorney in New York City who finds out that her boyfriend Mark is already married and has another girlfriend
- Leslie Mann as Kate King, a business-educated housewife in Connecticut who discovers that her husband Mark is cheating on her with two women
- Kate Upton as Amber, an Amazon swimsuit supermodel living in the Hamptons and Mark's second girlfriend who believes that Mark is in the process of divorcing his wife
- Nikolaj Coster-Waldau as Mark King, a wealthy businessman who is cheating by sleeping with his wife Kate and two girlfriends, Carly and Amber, at the same time, as well as embezzling money from his own company
- Nicki Minaj as Lydia, Carly's confidante and assistant
- Taylor Kinney as Phil, Kate's younger brother who becomes romantically involved with Carly
- Don Johnson as Frank Whitten, Carly's father who dates women half his age
- David Thornton as Nick, Mark's earlier business partner
- Victor Cruz as Fernando, a limousine driver Carly hired
- Olivia Culpo as raven-haired beauty, one of Mark's conquests in the Caribbean
- Radio Man as himself

== Production ==
=== Development ===
On January 16, 2012, it was announced that 2007 Black Listed screenwriter Melissa Stack was hired by 20th Century Fox to write an untitled female revenge comedy, which Julie Yorn would produce through LBI Productions. The film's script was described as the original idea from the 1996 film The First Wives Club, but with younger leads. The film's title was revealed to be The Other Woman on November 13. In January of the following year, Nick Cassavetes signed on to direct the film.

=== Casting ===
In November 2012, Cameron Diaz was in talks for the lead role. Diaz's representative also revealed that actress Kristen Wiig was under consideration for the wife role. In March 2013, Leslie Mann and Nikolaj Coster-Waldau were in talks to join the film, and Diaz was confirmed for her role. The following month, Kate Upton, Taylor Kinney, and Nicki Minaj, in her feature film debut, joined the film. Don Johnson was cast in June as Diaz's character's father.

=== Filming ===
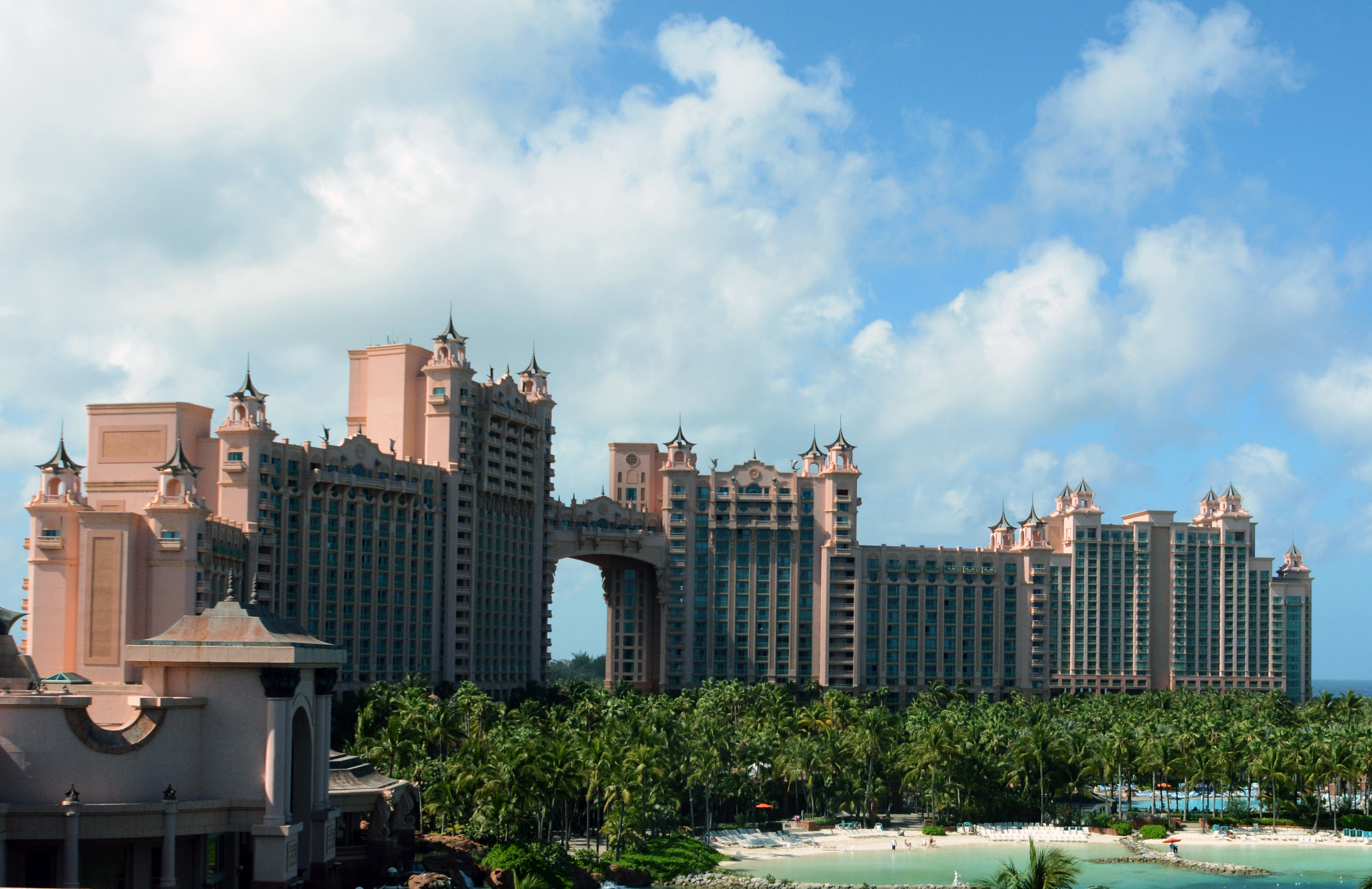
The Atlantis Paradise Island, used as a filming location

In March 2013, shooting was set to begin late spring or early summer 2013 in New York City. It was later reported that production would begin in May 2013. Principal photography began on April 29, 2013, and filming was completed by August 27, 2013. Most of the filming took place in parts of New York, including Long Island, the Hamptons, and Westhampton Beach. From July 18 to 23, filming took place in New Providence, where Nassau, the Bahamas, was used as the filming location. The Atlantis Paradise Island was also used as the shooting location. Isola Trattoria and Crudo Bar at Mondrian Hotel in SoHo, Manhattan, was used for the scene in which the women meet for a celebratory toast at the end of the film.

=== Music ===
The Other Woman's music was composed by Aaron Zigman, who was reportedly set to score the film on May 31, 2013. The film featured songs from various artists including Etta James, Ester Dean, Morcheeba, Cyndi Lauper, Britt Nicole, Patty Griffin, Lorde, Keyshia Cole, and Iggy Azalea.

== Release ==
On March 31, 2014, the film had a world premiere in Amsterdam; the next day, on April 1, it had a UK premiere at the Curzon Mayfair Cinema in London. The film later had a US premiere on April 21 in Westwood, California.

On March 25, 2014, Fox appealed the R-rating, which Motion Picture Association of America (MPAA) gave the film for sexual references. The studio wanted a PG-13 rating. On April 9, the MPAA's rating appeals board took back the R and gave the film a PG-13; the sources confirmed that there were no changes made to get the film PG-13. The Other Woman was released on April 25 in the United States.

=== Home media ===
The Other Woman was released on DVD and Blu-ray on July 29, 2014. The Blu-ray edition features a gag reel, giggle fits, a gallery and deleted scenes. In the United States, the film has grossed $9,592,336 from DVD sales and $4,163,463 from Blu-ray sales, making a total of $13,755,799.

== Reception ==
=== Box office ===
The Other Woman opened at number one in North America on April 25, 2014, in 3,205 theaters debuting atop the weekend box office with earnings of $24.7 million across the three days. The film grossed $83.9 million in the United States and Canada, and $112.8 million in other territories, for a worldwide total of $196.7 million, against a production budget of $40 million.

=== Critical response ===
The Other Woman received mainly negative reviews from critics. On the review aggregator website Rotten Tomatoes, the film holds an approval rating of 26% based on 165 reviews, with an average rating of 4.3/10. The website's critics consensus reads, "The Other Woman definitely boasts a talented pedigree, but all that skill is never fully brought to bear on a story that settles for cheap laughs instead of reaching its empowering potential." On Metacritic, the film has a score of 39 out of 100 based on reviews from 35 critics, indicating "generally unfavorable" reviews. Audiences polled by CinemaScore gave the film an average grade of "B+" on an A+ to F scale.

Audiences looking for a nonstop laugh riot may be disappointed, but the big laughs are there, and they benefit from the movie's underlying sincerity.

— Mick LaSalle — San Francisco Chronicle

Justin Chang of Variety said, "Beneath the wobbly pratfalls and the scatological setpieces, there's no denying the film's mean-spirited kick, or its more-than-passing interest in what makes its women tick." The Hollywood Reporter's critic Todd McCarthy said, "It would have helped if director Nick Cassavetes had something resembling a sure hand at comedy." Ignatiy Vishnevetsky of The A.V. Club gave the film grade C−, saying, "All of a sudden, a spotted Great Dane squats in the middle of a Manhattan apartment and out plop several gleaming, glistening CGI turds. It's one of those cases where a Hollywood movie inadvertently summarizes itself in a single shot." Michael Phillips of Chicago Tribune gave the film two and a half stars out of four, saying "Line to line, it's fresher than any number of guy-centric "Hangover"-spawned affairs, despite director Cassavetes' lack of flair for slapstick." The Boston Globe's Ty Burr gave the film one out of four stars and said, "It's The First Wives Club rewritten for younger, less demanding audiences, or a 9 to 5 with absolutely nothing at stake." Stephanie Zacharek of The Village Voice said, "The Other Woman doesn't give these actresses much to do except look ridiculous, if not sneaky and conniving."

The vapid story – and its intended humor – meanders and loses its way in predictable sit-com style.

— Claudia Puig — USA Today

Michael Sragow of The Orange County Register gave the film grade C, saying that the film is "a coarse, rickety comedy." Richard Corliss wrote for Time magazine that "All three women are less watchable and amusing than Nicki Minaj as Carly's legal assistant Lydia." Film critic Stephen Holden of The New York Times said that the film is "so dumb, lazy, clumsily assembled and unoriginal, it could crush any actor forced to execute its leaden slapstick gags and mouth its crude, humorless dialogue." James Berardinelli of ReelViews wondered, "Has it come to this for director Nick Cassavetes?", comparing his career negatively to that of his father, John Cassavetes. Berardinelli elaborated, "what a comedown to find him in charge of such an unfocused, unfunny, scatologically-obsessed 'comedy.'" Christy Lemire of RogerEbert.com gave the film two out of four stars and said, "While "The Other Woman" raises some thoughtful questions about independence, identity and the importance of sisterhood, ultimately it would rather poop on them and then throw them through a window in hopes of the getting the big laugh." Wesley Morris of Grantland said, "No one knows which takes are funny and which aren't. More than once, all three women, especially poor Upton, are caught looking like they don't know what they're doing."

Bilge Ebiri of Vulture said, "You can't shake the feeling that in a just world, all these women – even Kate Upton – would have better material than this." Connie Ogle of The Miami Herald gave the film three out of four stars and called the film a "goofy, ridiculous, with more gross-out humor than is strictly necessary but still funny. It falls into the category of Girlfriend Films – as in, go with your girlfriends and leave your date/partner/spouse at home with the PlayStation or the NBA playoffs." Colin Covert of Star Tribune gave the film three out of four stars, saying "It's an escapist women's empowerment comedy like many others, but elevated by the simple virtue of being, for most of its length, very, very funny." Ann Hornaday of The Washington Post gave the film one and a half stars out of four, saying "A movie as generic and forgettable as the sofa-size art on its characters' walls." Linda Holmes wrote for NPR, calling the film "a conceptually odious, stupid-to-the-bone enterprise ..." Betsy Sharkey of the Los Angeles Times advised guys to "Step away from the vehicle, because The Other Woman is out of control and intent on running down a certain kind of male."

=== Accolades ===
Awards and nominations for The Other Woman
Year	Award	Category	Recipient(s)	Result
2014	Teen Choice Awards	Choice Movie: Comedy	The Other Woman	Won
2014	Teen Choice Awards	Choice Movie Actress: Comedy	Cameron Diaz	Nominated
2014	Teen Choice Awards	Choice Movie: Chemistry	Cameron Diaz, Leslie Mann and Kate Upton	Nominated
2015	People's Choice Awards	Favorite Comedic Movie	The Other Woman	Nominated
2015	People's Choice Awards	Favorite Comedic Movie Actress	Cameron Diaz	Nominated
2015	Golden Raspberry Awards	Worst Actress	Cameron Diaz (also for Sex Tape)	Won
2015	MTV Movie Awards	Best Shirtless Performance	Kate Upton	Nominated
