= What Happens in Vegas =

2008 film by Tom Vaughan

- Theatrical release poster
- Directed by: Tom Vaughan
- Written by: Dana Fox
- Produced by: Michael Aguilar; Shawn Levy; Jimmy Miller
- Starring: Cameron Diaz; Ashton Kutcher; Rob Corddry; Treat Williams; Dennis Miller
- Cinematography: Matthew F. Leonetti
- Edited by: Matt Friedman
- Music by: Christophe Beck
- Production companies: 20th Century Fox; Regency Enterprises; 21 Laps Entertainment; Mosaic Media Group; Dune Entertainment; Penn Station Entertainment
- Distributed by: 20th Century Fox
- Release dates: April 22, 2008 (London); May 9, 2008 (United States)
- Running time: 101 minutes
- Country: United States
- Language: English
- Budget: $35 million
- Box office: $219.3 million

What Happens in Vegas (stylized as WHAT HAPPENS IN Vega$) is a 2008 American romantic comedy film directed by Tom Vaughan, written by Dana Fox, and starring Cameron Diaz and Ashton Kutcher. Its title is based on the Las Vegas marketing catchphrase "What Happens in Vegas, Stays in Vegas". The film follows New Yorkers Joy McNally (Diaz) and Jack Fuller (Kutcher); who meet inadvertently in Las Vegas, party so heavily that neither remembers getting married, and win a casino jackpot prize, but their simple plan to get a quick divorce and divide the money is complicated by the divorce court judge's ruling.

What Happens in Vegas had its world premiere in London on April 22, 2008, followed by a Los Angeles premiere on May 1, 2008. It was theatrically released in the United States on May 9, 2008, by 20th Century Fox. Despite negative reviews from critics, the film was a box office success, grossing $219.3 million worldwide against a production budget of $35 million.

== Plot ==
In New York City, high-strung commodity futures trader Joy Ellis McNally is dumped by fiancé Mason at the surprise birthday party that she threw for him. At the same time, easy-going carpenter Jack Fuller Jr. is fired by his father, Jack Sr. Both Joy and Jack are distraught and take debauched trips to Las Vegas with respective best friends, Toni "Tipper", who is a bartender, and Jeff "Hater", a lawyer.

Joy and Jack meet by chance when given the same hotel room due to a computer error. Once the misunderstanding is cleared up and receiving upgraded rooms and coupons to various clubs, they party and drink together and end up getting married. The next morning, agreeing it was a mistake, they plan to divorce.

Before they can do so, Jack uses a quarter Joy gives him in a slot machine, hitting a three-million-dollar jackpot. Joy reminds him that they are married and consequently she is entitled to half of the money. They return to New York, where they attempt to divorce. The judge declares they cannot divorce until they attempt to co-exist for six months, while attending weekly sessions with marriage counselor Dr. Twitchell. If they work at the marriage but still want to divorce after six months, each can keep half the winnings. If either party does not cooperate, the money will be tied up in litigation by the judge.

The newlyweds devise more and more cunning schemes to undermine each other, such as Jack telling Joy that their counseling session is canceled to show she is not committed, and Joy inviting girls to their apartment to seduce him, throwing a party. Jack gives Joy's ex-fiancé, Mason, her engagement ring back without her knowing. However, at Joy's work retreat, they unexpectedly find themselves attracted to each other.

Returning from the retreat, it is time for the judge to decide what happens to the money. On her way to the hearing, Joy sees Mason, who tells her he wants her back. Giving back the engagement ring, he tells her she is good enough for him. Joy thinks Jack set her up with Mason to cheat on him to guarantee divorce.

Joy walks away from Mason and goes to the hearing. There, the marriage counselor testifies that the couple worked on the marriage. The judge decides they will split the remaining 1.4 million dollars (after taxes, bills Joy ran up, and money Jack spent on his new woodworking business). Joy tells the judge she does not want any of the money and as she leaves she gives the engagement ring to Jack, telling him she wants nothing from him.

Joy is offered a promotion, but declines it, telling her boss she would rather be happy doing nothing than miserable doing something she hates. Jack's parents tell him it looks like he and Joy are in love. Realizing his mistake, he goes to find her. Tipper tells Jack that she quit her job and nobody knows where she is. He suspects that she has gone to Fire Island, New York, the only place that makes her feel truly happy. Finding her, Jack proposes (again) and she says yes.

During the closing credits, there are scenes from the day Jack and Joy get married, of Tipper and Hater subsequently enacting a plan of revenge on Mason.

== Cast ==
- Cameron Diaz as Joy McNally
- Ashton Kutcher as Jack Fuller Jr.
- Rob Corddry as Jeffrey "Hater" Lewis
- Lake Bell as Toni "Tipper" Saxson
- Treat Williams as Jack Fuller Sr.
- Dennis Farina as Richard "Dick" Banger
- Jason Sudeikis as Mason
- Dennis Miller as Judge Whopper
- Zach Galifianakis as Dave 'The Bear'
- Michelle Krusiec as Chong
- Deirdre O'Connell as Mrs. Judy Fuller
- Krysten Ritter as Kelly
- Queen Latifah as Dr. Twitchell
- Andy Daly as Curtis
- Billy Eichner as Band Leader

== Release ==
The film had its world premiere at the Odeon in Leicester Square, London, on April 22, 2008. Twentieth Century Fox held the U.S. premiere on May 1, 2008, at the Mann Village Theatre in Westwood, CA. It opened in wide release in the United States on May 9, 2008.

American Big Brother 9 housemates Ryan and Sharon were given a special screening of the film after winning a "luxury competition" in April. They were also awarded tickets to the May 1 Hollywood premiere.

== Reception ==
=== Box office ===
What Happens in Vegas grossed $80.3 million in the United States and Canada and $131.4 million in other territories for a total of $219.4 million worldwide, against a production budget of $35 million.

In its opening weekend, the film grossed $20.2 million in 3,215 theaters in the United States and Canada, finishing second at the box office behind Iron Man.

=== Critical response ===
What Happens in Vegas received generally negative reviews from critics. On Rotten Tomatoes the film has a rating of 25%, based on 135 reviews, with an average rating of 4.40/10. The site's critical consensus reads, "What Happens in Vegas has a few laughs, but mostly settles for derivative romantic comedy conventions and receives little help from a pair of unlikable leads." On Metacritic the film has a score of 36 out of 100, based on 31 critics, indicating "generally unfavorable reviews".

Manohla Dargis of The New York Times slammed it, stating that What Happens in Vegas is "one of those junky time-wasters that routinely pop up in movie theaters". Metromix Chicago's Matt Pais called it "bland, boring and not fun at all".

The film received two Razzie Award nominations including Worst Actress (Cameron Diaz) and Worst Screen Couple (Cameron Diaz and Ashton Kutcher). Both awards went to Paris Hilton for The Hottie and the Nottie.

== See also ==
- List of films set in Las Vegas
