= The Sweetest Thing (film) =

2002 film by Roger Kumble

- Theatrical release poster
- Directed by: Roger Kumble
- Written by: Nancy Pimental
- Produced by: Cathy Konrad
- Starring: Cameron Diaz; Christina Applegate; Selma Blair; Thomas Jane; Jason Bateman; Parker Posey
- Cinematography: Anthony B. Richmond
- Edited by: Wendy Greene Bricmont; David Rennie
- Music by: Edward Shearmur
- Production companies: Columbia Pictures; Konrad Pictures
- Distributed by: Sony Pictures Releasing
- Release date: April 12, 2002 (United States)
- Running time: 85 minutes
- Country: United States
- Language: English
- Budget: $43 million
- Box office: $68.7 million

The Sweetest Thing is a 2002 American romantic comedy film directed by Roger Kumble and written by Nancy Pimental, who based the characters on herself and an all-female crew of waitresses she used to work and party with. It stars Cameron Diaz, Christina Applegate, and Selma Blair.

Christina Walters spent years avoiding commitment, then suddenly meets Peter, someone impervious to her charms while out with her best friends, Courtney and Jane. Not able to get him out of her mind, and Courtney and she set out on a trip to find him at a wedding he mentioned.

The film was released on April 12, 2002, and received negative reviews from critics. However, according to screenwriter Nancy Pimental, the film later went on to gain a cult following.

== Plot ==
A group of men are interviewed regarding Christina Walters; they consider her a player and a user of men in the swinging singles market. She is a 28-year-old successful interior designer living in San Francisco near North Beach.

Christina meets up with her friend Courtney Rockcliffe, a divorce lawyer. They console their friend and roommate Jane, who had recently been dumped by her boyfriend, by taking her out to a dance club. Jane feels out of place, so Christina grabs a random man named Peter to set Jane up with. However, he berates her for her methods, leaving her standing there. While in the bathroom with Courtney, she refers to him by name, leading her to suspect that he got under Christina's skin and she is actually in love with him, which she denies.

After running into Peter again, Christina buys him a drink and they spend time together. He explains that he will be attending a wedding on Saturday, and that he is at the club with his obnoxious, womanizing brother Roger to celebrate. Peter invites Christina and Courtney to an after-party at their hotel, but Christina goes home and later regrets not going.

The next day, while having lunch with Courtney, Christina cannot stop talking about Peter, while Jane pays an embarrassing visit to the dry cleaner. (Note: In the unrated version, Jane also returns to the lunch and the women talk about always complimenting men for the sizes of their penises, eventually breaking out into a restaurant-wide "Penis Song".)

Courtney arranges for Christina and herself to travel to Somerset, where Peter's brother's wedding is to take place, and they meet Jane's new boyfriend, whom she previously met at the club. After they leave in Courtney's Saab 9-5, Christina and Courtney go on a series of misadventures including: an exploding toilet; a glory hole discovery; and a motorcyclist who believes that he is seeing Courtney receiving cunnilingus from Christina while driving after Courtney drops her lipstick on the floorboard and Christina bends over to retrieve it.

Meanwhile, Jane encounters her boyfriend at her retail job and is nearly caught having sex with him in a changing room. When Christina and Courtney finally arrive in Somerset, they visit a store to replace their wet and ruined clothes, only to come out in extremely gaudy, indiscreet outfits.

When they arrive at the wedding, Christina begins having second thoughts, but a series of coincidences, including a chance conversation with the bride, causes her to have a change of heart, and they attend. However, they discover that it is Peter, not Roger, who is getting married, and the pair nearly ruin the ceremony in their attempt to escape. Peter and his fiancée then decide that they do not want to marry each other and call off the wedding.

Christina and Courtney return home and help Jane get out of a sexual situation with her boyfriend where the emergency crew was called in. Sometime later, Courtney is dating a doctor and is clearly very attracted to him, and Christina is back to a newly unfulfilled life of being single again. Later, Peter finds Christina's address in the log at the store they bought their clothes in and tracks her down. Christina, determined not to fear the commitment, kisses Peter and then walks away, seemingly disappointed.

Peter is interviewed like the men at the beginning of the film, retelling his version of the events calling Christina a bitch and a player, but ultimately reveals that he and Christina are together, having gotten married and are living very happily with Jane, Courtney and Roger as well.

== Cast ==
- Cameron Diaz as Christina Walters
- Christina Applegate as Courtney Rockcliffe
- Thomas Jane as Peter Donahue
- Selma Blair as Jane Burns
- Jason Bateman as Roger Donahue
- Parker Posey as Judy Webb
- Nancy Priddy as Mrs. Franklin
- Warren Powers as Uncredited Extra

== Home media ==
The film was released on DVD and VHS on August 20, 2002, by Columbia TriStar Home Entertainment.

An unrated version was also released on DVD with some extra scenes added, including a musical performance by Diaz, Applegate and Blair, known as "The Penis Song".

== Reception ==
On its opening weekend, it earned US$9,430,667 on 2,670 screens, ranking #3 behind Changing Lanes and Panic Room. It eventually grossed US$68,696,770 worldwide.

=== Critical response ===
On Rotten Tomatoes, the film holds an approval rating of 25% based on 110 reviews, with an average rating of 4.30/10. The site's consensus called the film "a collection of hit-or-miss gags tied together by a thin plot." On Metacritic, the film has a weighted average score of 32 out of 100, based on 30 critics, indicating "generally unfavorable reviews". Audiences surveyed by CinemaScore gave the film an average grade of "C+" on an A+ to F scale.

It was among Ebert & Roeper's "Worst of 2002", in the category "Big Stars in Big Bombs".
