= Nightmare in the Daylight =

1992 television film directed by Lou Antonio

- Genre: Drama; Thriller
- Written by: Frederic Hunter
- Directed by: Lou Antonio
- Starring: Jaclyn Smith; Christopher Reeve
- Music by: David Shire
- Country of origin: United States
- Original language: English

Production
- Executive producers: Barbara Hiser; Anthony B. Richmond; Edgar J. Scherick
- Producer: Henry Colman
- Production locations: Los Angeles; San Francisco
- Cinematography: Gayne Rescher
- Editor: Gary Griffin
- Running time: 96 minutes
- Production companies: Saban/Scherick Productions; Smith Richmond Productions

Original release
- Network: CBS
- Release: November 22, 1992

Nightmare in the Daylight is a 1992 American made-for-television thriller film directed by Lou Antonio, starring Jaclyn Smith and Christopher Reeve. It premiered on CBS on November 22, 1992.

== Plot ==
Sean Farrell (Reeve) is a lawyer working in San Francisco, who in the past beat his long-lost wife, Jean, who disappeared in the 1985 Mexico City earthquake. One day, he notices Megan Lambert (Smith), a Wisconsin teacher visiting the city with her husband Peter (Mason) and son Jamie (Bell). He grows convinced that Megan is his wife and Jamie is his son, ignoring any denials she is making. After briefly abducting her, he contacts his lost wife's father, who tells Sean that Megan is not his daughter. Sean, by now, is too obsessed with Megan, resulting in the woman and her family living in constant fear.

== Cast ==
- Jaclyn Smith as Megan Lambert
- Christopher Reeve as Sean Farrell
- Tom Mason as Peter Lambert
- Glynnis O'Connor as Sloan Evans
- Christina Pickles as Sarah Jenner
- Eric Bell as Jamie Lambert
- John Ingle as Walter Scripps

== Production ==
The film was shot in San Francisco and Los Angeles.

== Reception ==
Variety wrote of the film: "The game-playing limps on, with Smith distressed and Reeve looking severe as though they'd both just read the script. Smith and Mason play well through some good naturalistic domestic scenes, but that doesn't much help the cause. By the end of the caper, Nightmare in the Daylight affirms the purposelessness of the venture. Tech credits are swell, with Michael Paul Clausen's production design a plus."
