= Roger Til =

French-American actor (1909–2002)

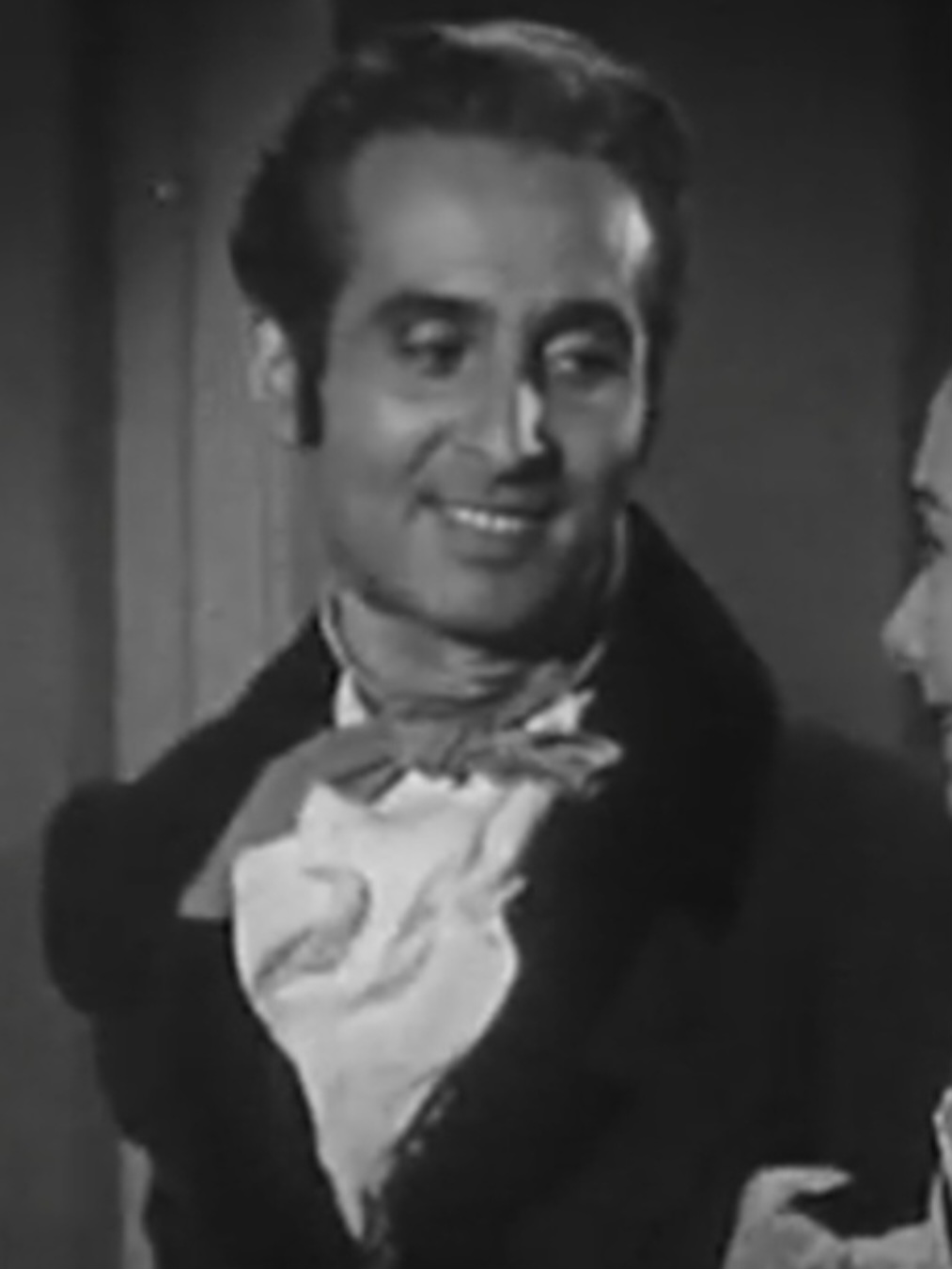
- Til in The Adventures of Jim Bowie, 1956
- Born: January 5, 1909; Paris, France
- Died: June 28, 2002 (aged 93); Los Angeles, California, U.S.
- Occupation(s): Film and television actor
- Years active: 1947–1994

Roger Til (January 5, 1909 – June 28, 2002) was a French-American film and television actor, often cast as a Maitre d' or Waiter.

== Life and career ==
Til was born in Paris, France. He played "Devillaine" in the miniseries The French Atlantic Affair, and guest-starred in numerous television programs including The Andy Griffith Show, Gomer Pyle, U.S.M.C., Laverne & Shirley, Mission: Impossible, The Bold and the Beautiful, Silver Spoons, The Facts of Life, Trapper John, M.D., The Rockford Files, Quincy, M.E., The Many Loves of Dobie Gillis, 77 Sunset Strip, The Man from U.N.C.L.E., Bosom Buddies, The Donna Reed Show, Fantasy Island and WKRP in Cincinnati.

Til died in June 2002 in Los Angeles, California, at the age of 93.

== Filmography ==
=== Film ===
Year	Title	Role	Notes
1947	Secret Cargo		
1948	Scandals of Clochemerie		
1950	Le Tampon du Capiston	Le Lieutenant	
1951	Les Memoires de la Vache Yolande		
1954	Le Rafle est Pour ce Soir	Raymond – Tami de Jean Duport	
1957	An Affair to Remember	French Commentator	Uncredited
1958	Lafayette Escadrille	Capitaine	Uncredited
1960	12 to the Moon	Dr. Etienne Martel	
1961	Valley of the Dragons	Vidal	
1963	Wall of Noise	Maitre d'	Uncredited
1963	Take Her, She's Mine	Inspector	Uncredited
1964	A Global Affair	Delegate	Uncredited
1969	Sweet Charity	Greeter at 'Pompeli Club'	Uncredited
1969	Topaz	Jean Chabrier	
1976	Harry and Walter Go to New York	Waiter	
1977	The Other Side of Midnight	Hotel Detective	
1977	Rollercoaster	Maitre d'	Uncredited
1984	Protocol	Belgium Ambassador	
1985	Brewster's Millions	Maitre d'	
1994	Stargate	Professor #2	(final film role)

=== Television ===
Year	Title	Role	Notes
1956	The Adventures of Hiram Holiday	High Dive Barker	Episode: "Dancing Mouse"
1957	The Adventures of Jim Bowie	Edward DuBios	Episode: "Monsieur Francois"
1958	The Walter Winchell File	Emil	Episode: "Flight to Freedom: File #36"
1958	Suspicion	Jacques	Episode: "Meeting in Paris"
1958	Northwest Passage	General Calgrenne	Episode: "The Red Coat"
1958	General Electric Theater	Herny Arnaud	Episode: "The World's Greatest Quarterback"
1958	The Donna Reed Show	Anton Duval	Episode: "Dough Re Mi"
1958–1959	Dragnet	Renald Bertello	3 episodes
1958–1960	The Millionaire	Doctor / Pierre – Antique Appraiser	2 episodes
1959–1960	77 Sunset Strip	Antoin Bonhomme / Inspector D'Avril	2 episodes
1960	The Loretta Young Show	Charles	Episode: "The Misfit"
1960	Surfside 6	Jacque Andre	Episode: "Deadly Male"
1961	Death Valley Days	Jean-Philippe Jacomet	Episode: "The Stolen City"
1962	The Andy Griffith Show	Waiter in French Restaurant	Episode: "Andy and Barney in the Big City"
1962	The New Loretta Young Show	Mr. Duprez	Episode: "Pony Tails and Politics"
1962	Combat!	French Priest	Episode: "Escape to Nowhere"
1963	The Many Loves of Dobie Gillis	Pierre	Episode: "Two for the Whipsaw"
1964	Burke's Law	Maitre d'	Episode: "Who Killed Annie Foran?"
1964	Kraft Suspense Theatre	Jacques, the Maitre d'	Episode: "One Tiger to a Hill"
1965	The Rogues	Bank Official	Episode: "The Laughing Lady of Luxor"
1965	Memorandum for Spy		TV movie
1965–1969	Gomer Pyle, U.S.M.C.	Waiter/Maitre d'	4 episodes
1965	Bob Hope Presents the Chrysler Theatre		2 episodes
1966	The Girl from U.N.C.L.E.	Bartender	Episode: "The Montori Device Affair"
1966	The Man from U.N.C.L.E.	Manager	Episode: "The Napoleon's Tomb Affair"
1966–1967	Mission: Impossible	Baccarat Croupier / Butler	2 episodes
1969	Dragnet	William Smith	TV movie
1973	Letters from Three Lovers	Maitre d'	TV movie
1975	Let's Switch		TV movie
1976	Kojak	Roget	Uncredited, Episode: "Justice Deferred"
1976	Raid on Entebbe	French President Valley Giscard d'Estaing	TV movie, Uncredited
1976–1977	The Bionic Woman	Maitre d' / Rochette / Robaire	3 episodes
1977	Laverne & Shirley	Maitre d'	Episode: "Hi Neighbor, Book 2"
1977	The Hardy Boys/Nancy Drew Mysteries	Paris Police Officer	Episode: "Hardy Boys and Nancy Drew Meet Dracula, Part I"
1978	Ziegfeld: The Man and His Women	Casino Manager	TV movie
1978	The Pirate	Dupree	TV movie
1979	Time Express	Crillon	Episode: "The Copy-Writer/The Figure Skater"
1979	The French Atlantic Affair	Devillaine	3 episodes
1979	The Rockford Files	Henri Tayir	Episode: "Lions, Tigers, Monkeys and Dogs"
1979	Quincy, M.E.	Claude Deschamps	Episode: "The Money Plague"
1980	Death Ray 2000	Henir	TV movie
1980	Doctor Franken	Anaesthesiologist	TV movie
1980	Fantasy Island	Old Man	Episode: "PlayGirl/Smith's Valhalla"
1980–1983	Hart to Hart	Maitre d' / Sommelier / Claude Luter	3 episodes
1981	Scruples	Phillipe Nizan	TV movie
1981	Jacqueline Bouvier Kennedy	Monnet	TV movie
1981	WKRP in Cincinnati	Andre	Episode: "Jennifer and the Will"
1981	Bosom Buddies	Maurice	Episode: "On the Road to Monte Carlo"
1982	Trapper John, M.D.	Maitre d'	Episode: "The Peter Pan Syndrome"
1982	The Facts of Life Goes to Paris	Chef Antoine	TV movie
1982	Knight Rider	Professor LeCalir	Episode: "Just My Bill"
1982	The Devlin Connection	Eli	Episode: "Ring of Kings, Ring of Thieves"
1982	Cagney & Lacey		Episode: "Internal Affairs"
1982	Benson	Monsieur Arnaud	Episode: "Pen Pal"
1983	Simon & Simon	Andre	Episode: "Murder Between the Lines"
1983	Grace Kelly	Bishop	TV movie
1983	The Facts of Life	Chef Antoine	Episode: "Guess Who's Coming to Dinner?"
1983	Bare Essence	Clemenseau	Episode: "Hour Seven"
1984	Blue Thunder	Francois	Episode: "Hour Seven"
1987	Silver Spoons	Maitre d'	Episode: "Pardon My French"
1987	The Bold and the Beautiful	Francois	1 episode
1987	Growing Pains	Waiter No. 2	Episode: "Confidentially Yours"
1990	Wings	Monsieur Busard	Episode: "A Standup Kind of Guy"
1992	Parker Lewis Can't Lose	Head Waiter	Episode: "Jerry's Journey"
