= In the Arms of a Killer =

- Genre: Drama; Thriller
- Written by: Robert L. Collins
- Directed by: Robert L. Collins
- Starring: Jaclyn Smith; John Spencer; Nina Foch
- Music by: Lee Holdridge
- Country of origin: United States
- Original language: English

Production
- Executive producer: Robert L. Collins
- Producer: Ronald A. Levinson
- Cinematography: Anthony B. Richmond
- Editor: Robert K. Lambert
- Running time: 93 minutes
- Production companies: MGM Television; Monarch Pictures Corporation; RLC Productions

Original release
- Network: NBC
- Release: January 5, 1992

In the Arms of a Killer is a 1992 American crime drama television film written and directed by Robert L. Collins.

== Plot ==
Maria Quinn (Smith) has only recently begun working as a detective in Manhattan, but is already assigned to investigate a horrendous murder involving a drug lord who is given an overdose of heroin at a party. The case takes a personal turn when the detective finds out that the prime suspect is her lover.

== Cast ==
- Jaclyn Smith as Maria Quinn
- John Spencer as Det. Vincent Cusack
- Nina Foch as Mrs. Venible
- Gerald S. O'Loughlin as Art Seidensticker
- Sandahl Bergman as Nurse Henninger
- Linda Dona as Chrissy
- Alan Blumenfeld as Arthur Golding
- Robert Miranda as Benny Rosen
- Kristoffer Tabori as Dennis
- Michael Nouri as Brian Venible
