= Christine Cromwell =

American crime drama television series

- Christine Cromwell title card
- Genre: Crime drama
- Created by: Dick Wolf
- Developed by: Michael Duggan
- Directed by: Harvey Hart; E.W. Swackhamer; Leo Penn
- Starring: Jaclyn Smith; Celeste Holm; Ralph Bellamy; Rebecca Cross
- Country of origin: United States
- Original language: English
- No. of seasons: 1
- No. of episodes: 4

Production
- Running time: 120 minutes (including commercials)
- Production companies: Wolf Films; Universal Television

Original release
- Network: ABC
- Release: November 11, 1989 – February 17, 1990

Christine Cromwell is an American crime drama television series that aired as a rotating element of the ABC Mystery Movie. It debuted on November 11, 1989, and ended on February 17, 1990, with four episodes presented semi-monthly.

== Premise and cast ==
Christine Cromwell, portrayed by Jaclyn Smith, is a lawyer for a prestigious law firm in San Francisco with cases that involve famous, wealthy people. She was valedictorian of her class in Harvard Law School and worked as a public defender for a decade.

Cromwell enjoys high-society activities with her mother, Samantha (Celeste Holm) and works in the law firm with senior partner Cyrus Blain (Ralph Bellamy). Other regulars were Sarah the secretary (Rebecca Cross) and Nanny the housekeeper (Ellen Albertini).

Dick Wolf was the executive producer.

== Reaction ==
Mark Dawidziak, in an article distributed by Knight Ridder newspapers, praised the first episode's production values but described the plot as "horribly hackneyed." He added that the program went from fun in the first hour to being a dud in its conclusion.

== Episodes ==
No.	Title	Original release date
1	"Things That Go Bump in the Night"	November 11, 1989
A friend of Christine's claims self-defense in the death of her husband, a wealthy client of the firm.
2	"Easy Come, Easy Go"	December 9, 1989
Two clients of the firm are accused of murdering a con artist who swindled a million dollars out of each of them.
3	"In Vino Veritas"	January 27, 1990
A winegrower's body turns up at the 100th-anniversary pressing following a feud with his brother.
4	"Only the Good Die Young"	February 17, 1990
Four members of a college tontine are murdered, leaving the three survivors to share millions.
