= Mrs. Munck =

- Directed by: Diane Ladd
- Screenplay by: Diane Ladd
- Based on: Mrs. Munck by Ella Leffland
- Produced by: Barbara Boyle; Michael Taylor
- Starring: Diane Ladd; Bruce Dern; Kelly Preston; Shelley Winters; Jim Walton; Scott Fisher
- Cinematography: James Glennon
- Edited by: Maysie Hoy
- Music by: Leonard Rosenman
- Production companies: Diane Ladd Inc. Showtime Networks; Viacom Productions
- Distributed by: Showtime
- Release dates: September 26, 1995 (TIFF); January 1, 1996 (United States)
- Running time: 90 minutes
- Country: United States
- Language: English

Mrs. Munck is a 1995 American comedy film written and directed by Diane Ladd. It is based on the 1970 novel Mrs. Munck by Ella Leffland. The film stars Diane Ladd, Bruce Dern, Kelly Preston, Shelley Winters, Jim Walton and Scott Fisher. The film premiered on Showtime on January 28, 1996.

== Plot ==
A widow exacts revenge on her wheelchair-using father-in-law for an affair they had in her youth.

== Cast ==
- Diane Ladd as Rose Munck
- Bruce Dern as Patrick Leary
- Kelly Preston as Young Rose Munck
- Shelley Winters as Aunt Monica
- Jim Walton as Harley
- Scott Fisher as Felix
- Vinnie Sciullo as Marino
- Chris Leavens as Steve
- Seymour Cassel as Gem
- Bernard Arene as Maitre / Waiter
- Phallon Carpino as Two Year Old Daughter
- Travis Kyle Davis as Boy
- Steve Bulen as Quigley

== Soundtrack ==
The film's theme song, "Not A Day Goes By", was written by Carol Connors and Steve Plunkett, and performed by David Hasselhoff.
