= Anthony B. Richmond =

British cinematographer

- Born: Anthony Barry Richmond; 7 July 1942 (age 84); London, England, UK
- Years active: 1963–2017
- Spouses: Jaclyn Smith (m. 1981; div. 1989) Amanda DiGiulio (m. 1995)
- Children: 6, including George
- Relatives: Fran Kranz (former-son-in-law)

Anthony Barry Richmond BSC, ASC (born 7 July 1942) is an English cinematographer, film producer, and director.

== Career ==
He was the cinematographer for the 10-camera filming of the final Beatles film Let It Be (1970), the original footage from which was re-edited by Peter Jackson into the highly acclaimed docu-series The Beatles: Get Back (2021).

For his work on Nicolas Roeg's Don't Look Now, Richmond received the 1973 BAFTA Award for Best Cinematography.

In 1985, he made his sole directorial credit with the drama Déjà Vu.

Richmond is a member of the American and British Societies of Cinematographers.

== Filmography ==
=== Feature film ===
Year	Title	Director	Notes
1968	Only When I Larf	Basil Dearden	
1968	Sympathy for the Devil	Jean-Luc Godard	
1971	The Insomniac	Rodney Giesler	
1972	Madame Sin	David Greene	
1973	Don't Look Now	Nicolas Roeg	
1974	Vampira	Clive Donner	
1974	Stardust	Michael Apted	
1975	Change	Bernd Fischerauer	
1976	The Man Who Fell to Earth	Nicolas Roeg	
1976	The Eagle Has Landed	John Sturges	
1977	Silver Bears	Ivan Passer	
1978	The Greek Tycoon	J. Lee Thompson	
1979	Love and Bullets	Stuart Rosenberg	European photography
1979	The American Success Company	William Richert	
1980	Bad Timing	Nicolas Roeg	
1980	Head On	Michael Grant	
1980	Nightkill	Ted Post	
1981	Improper Channels	Eric Till	
1982	Slapstick of Another Kind	Steven Paul	
1986	That's Life!	Blake Edwards	
1988	The In Crowd	Mark Rosenthal	
1988	Sunset	Blake Edwards	
1989	Cat Chaser	Abel Ferrara	
1991	Scissors	Frank De Felitta	
1991	Timebomb	Avi Nesher	
1991	The Indian Runner	Sean Penn	
1992	Candyman	Bernard Rose	
1993	The Sandlot	David Mickey Evans	
1995	Tales from the Hood	Rusty Cundieff	
1995	The Immortals	Brian Grant	
1996	Bastard Out of Carolina	Anjelica Huston	
1996	First Kid	David Mickey Evans	
1997	Playing God	Andy Wilson	
1999	Ravenous	Antonia Bird	
1999	A Walk on the Moon	Tony Goldwyn	
1999	Agnes Browne	Anjelica Huston	
1999	Cherry Falls	Geoffrey Wright	
2000	Men of Honor	George Tillman Jr.	
2001	Someone like You	Tony Goldwyn	
2001	Legally Blonde	Robert Luketic	
2002	The Sweetest Thing	Roger Kumble	
2003	My Teacher, My Friend II	David Mickey Evans	With Kim Lee Ong
2003	Shade	Damian Nieman	
2003	Dumb and Dumberer: When Harry Met Lloyd	Troy Miller	
2004	Dirty Dancing: Havana Nights	Guy Ferland	
2004	A Cinderella Story	Mark Rosman	
2005	Just Friends	Roger Kumble	
2006	John Tucker Must Die	Betty Thomas	
2006	Employee of the Month	Greg Coolidge	
2007	Good Luck Chuck	Mark Helfrich	
2007	The Comebacks	Tom Brady	
2008	The Rocker	Peter Cattaneo	
2008	Autopsy	Adam Gierasch	
2009	Miss March	Trevor Moore; Zach Cregger	
2009	Alvin and the Chipmunks: The Squeakquel	Betty Thomas	
2011	Big Mommas: Like Father, Like Son	John Whitesell	
2012	Diary of a Wimpy Kid: Dog Days	David Bowers	
2013	Coffee Town	Brad Copeland	
2017	Diary of a Wimpy Kid: The Long Haul	David Bowers	

Documentary film

Year	Title	Director	Notes
1968	One + One	Jean-Luc Godard	
1970	Let It Be	Michael Lindsay-Hogg	
1979	The Kids Are Alright	Jeff Stein	With Peter Nevard and Norman Warwick
1996	The Rolling Stones Rock and Roll Circus	Michael Lindsay-Hogg	

=== Television ===
Year	Title	Director	Notes
1969	ITV Saturday Night Theatre	Derek Bennett	Episode "In Another Country"
2012	Audrey	Betty Thomas	All 6 episodes

TV films

Year	Title	Director	Notes
1984	Sentimental Journey	William Cosel; James Goldstone	With Richard C. Kratina
1986	John Grin's Christmas	Robert Guillaume	
1988	The Loner	Abel Ferrara	
1989	The Road Raiders	Richard Lang	
1989	Prime Target	Robert L. Collins	
1989	Settle the Score	Edwin Sherin	
1992	In the Arms of a Killer	Robert L. Collins	
1992	Midnight's Child	Colin Bucksey	
1992	Four Eyes and Six Guns	Piers Haggard	
1992	Angie, the Lieutenant	Robert L. Collins	
1993	A Case for Murder	Duncan Gibbins	
1993	Heart of Darkness	Nicolas Roeg	
1994	Motorcycle Gang	John Milius	Part of the Rebel Highway series
1995	Full Body Massage	Nicolas Roeg	
1998	The Garbage Picking Field Goal Kicking Philadelphia Phenomenon	Tim Kelleher	
1999	And the Beat Goes On: The Sonny and Cher Story	David Burton Morris	
2001	Sister Mary Explains It All	Marshall Brickman	
2005	Riding the Bus with My Sister	Anjelica Huston	
2008	Sex and Lies in Sin City	Peter Medak	
2009	Acceptance	Sanaa Hamri	With Frank Byers
2011	William & Kate: The Movie	Mark Rosman	

Miniseries

Year	Title	Director	Notes
1997	Rough Riders	John Milius	
2014	The Assets	Peter Medak	Episodes "The Straw Poll" and "Avenger"
2021	The Beatles: Get Back	Peter Jackson	Re-edit of the original footage used for Let It Be (1970)

== Accolades ==
Year	Award	Category	Title	Result
1973	BAFTA Awards	Best Cinematography	Don't Look Now	Won
2024	British Society of Cinematographers	Lifetime Achievement Award		Won
