= An Unremarkable Life =

- Directed by: Amin Q. Chaudhri
- Written by: Marcia Dinneen
- Produced by: Amin Q. Chaudhri
- Starring: Patricia Neal; Shelley Winters
- Cinematography: Alan Hall
- Edited by: Sandi Gerling
- Music by: Avery Sharpe
- Production company: Continental Film Group Ltd.
- Distributed by: SVS Films
- Release date: October 12, 1989 (New York City)
- Running time: 92 minutes
- Country: United States
- Language: English

An Unremarkable Life is a 1989 American drama film directed by Amin Q. Chaudhri and starring Patricia Neal and Shelley Winters.

== Cast ==
- Patricia Neal as Frances McEllany
- Shelley Winters as Evelyn McEllany
- Mako as Max Chin
- Rochelle Oliver as Mary Alice
- Charles S. Dutton as Lou

== Release ==
The film premiered theatrically in New York City on October 12, 1989.

== Reception ==
Rita Kempley of The Washington Post gave the film a negative review and called it "an embarrassment for venerable Patricia Neal, who stars with hambone Shelley Winters, who blushes at nothing."

Michael Wilmington of the Los Angeles Times gave the film a mixed review and wrote, "we get a mostly unremarkable pastiche--in which three fine actors manage, occasionally, to shine."

Steve Simels of Entertainment Weekly also gave the film a mixed review and wrote, "In short, An Unremarkable Life is a sleeper in the literal sense of the term."
