= Jaclyn Smith =

American actress (born 1945)

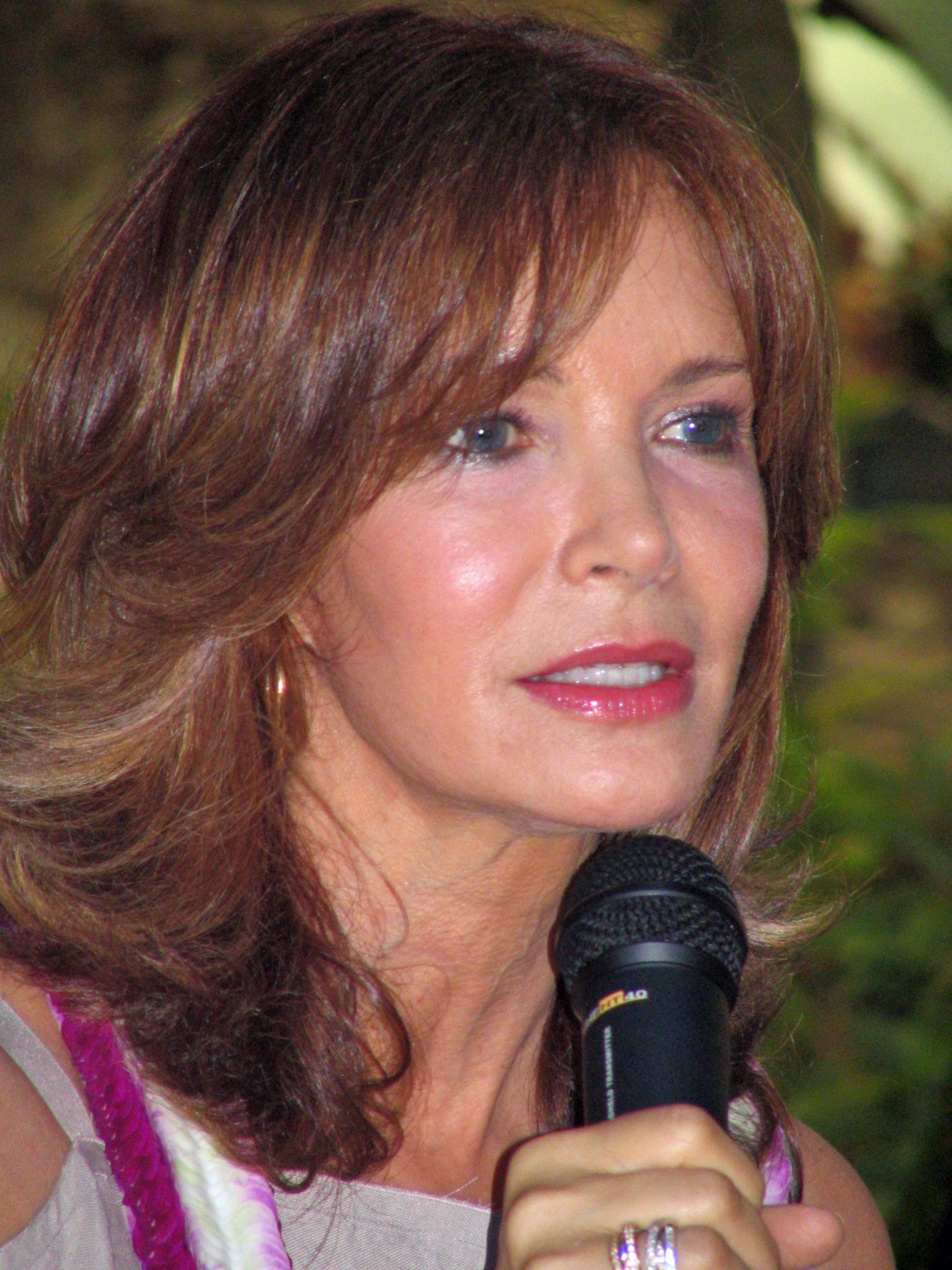
- Smith in June 2006
- Born: Jacquelyn Ellen Smith; October 26, 1945 (age 81); Houston, Texas, U.S.
- Education: Trinity University (Texas) (unfinished); Balanchine School of American Ballet
- Occupation: Actress
- Years active: 1968–present
- Known for: Charlie's Angels; The Bourne Identity; Christine Cromwell; The District; The Night They Saved Christmas
- Spouses: Roger Davis (m. 1968; div. 1975) Dennis Cole (m. 1978; div. 1981) Anthony B. Richmond (m. 1981; div. 1989) Brad Allen (m. 1997)
- Children: 2
- Relatives: Fran Kranz (former-son-in-law)
- Awards: Hollywood Walk of Fame
- Website: Official website

Jacquelyn Ellen "Jaclyn" Smith (born October 26, 1945) is an American actress. She is most notable for her role as Kelly Garrett in the television series Charlie's Angels (1976–1981), and was the only original female lead to remain with the series for its complete run. She reprised the role with cameo appearances in the films Charlie's Angels: Full Throttle (2003) and Charlie's Angels (2019). Her other films include Nightkill (1980) and Déjà Vu (1985). Beginning in the 1980s, she began developing and marketing her own brands of clothing and perfume.

Smith began her career in 1968 in minor roles. In 1976, she was cast in Charlie's Angels, alongside Kate Jackson and Farrah Fawcett. The show propelled all three to stardom, including an appearance on the front cover of Time magazine. She was nominated for the Golden Globe for Best Actress in a Miniseries or TV Film for the title role in the TV film Jacqueline Bouvier Kennedy (1981), and went on to star in numerous TV films and miniseries over the next 20 years, including Rage of Angels (1983), George Washington (1984), The Bourne Identity (1988), Kaleidoscope (1990) and Nightmare in the Daylight (1992). She had a recurring role from 2002 to 2004 in the drama series The District and appeared as Olivia Hodges in two episodes of CSI: Crime Scene Investigation in 2012.

== Early life ==
Smith was born in Houston, Texas, the daughter of Margaret Ellen (née Hartsfield) and Jack Smith (born Jacob Kupferschmidt), a dentist. She graduated from Mirabeau B. Lamar High School in 1964. She majored in psychology and drama at Trinity University (Texas) in San Antonio but completed only a year. Instead, she moved to New York and joined the Balanchine School of American Ballet.

== Career ==
=== Early career ===
Smith's career aspirations shifted to modeling and acting as she found work in television commercials and print ads, including one for Listerine mouthwash. In 1968, she was offered the role of Victoria Winters on the ABC daytime series Dark Shadows, which was being recast. The role went instead to Betsy Durkin, who replaced Alexandra Moltke.

First appearing uncredited in Goodbye, Columbus (1969), Smith had a noticeable role in The Adventurers (1970), in which she played a journalist. Both movies were filmed in 1968. Smith followed these with guest spots on shows like The Partridge Family, McCloud, Switch and The Rookies. She landed a job as a "Breck girl" for Breck Shampoo in 1971, and a few years later joined Farrah Fawcett as a spokesmodel for Wella Balsam shampoo. She was in the made-for-television movies Probe (1972) and Bootleggers (1974).

=== Charlie's Angels ===
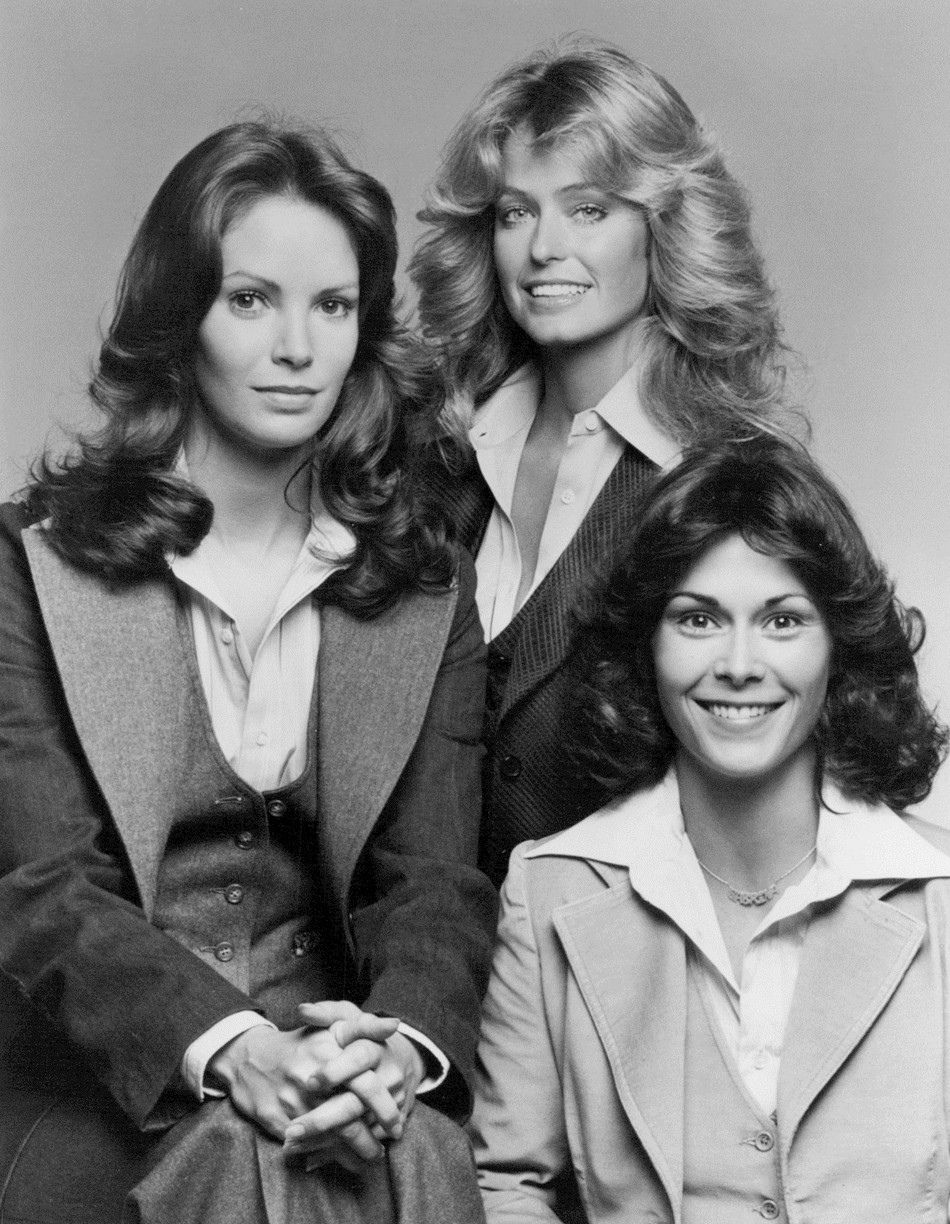
Smith (left) with Farrah Fawcett and Kate Jackson in Season 1 of Charlie's Angels

On March 21, 1976, Smith first played Kelly Garrett in Charlie's Angels; the show was aired as a movie of the week, starring Smith, Kate Jackson and Farrah Fawcett as private investigators for Townsend Associates, a detective agency run by a reclusive multi-millionaire whom the women had never met. Voiced by John Forsythe, the Charles Townsend character presented cases and dispensed advice via a speakerphone to his core team of three female employees, to whom he referred as "Angels". They were aided in the office and occasionally in the field by two male associates, played by character actors David Doyle and David Ogden Stiers. The program earned a huge Nielsen rating, causing the network to air it a second time and confirm production for a series, with all of the principal characters with the exception of Stiers. The series formally debuted on September 22, 1976, and ran for five seasons. The show would become a big success not only in the U.S. but, in successive years, in syndication around the world, spawning a cottage industry of peripheral products, particularly in the show's first three seasons, including several series of bubble gum cards, two sets of fashion dolls, numerous posters, puzzles, and school supplies, novelizations of episodes, toy vans, and a board game, all featuring Smith's likeness. The "Angels" also appeared on the covers of magazines around the world, from countless fan magazines to TV Guide (four times) to Time magazine.

Fawcett departed at the end of the first season, and Cheryl Ladd was a successful addition to the cast, remaining until the end of the series. Jackson departed at the end of the third season, and proved harder to replace, as first Shelley Hack and then Tanya Roberts were brought in to try re-igniting the chemistry, media attention and ratings success enjoyed by the earlier teams. Smith played her role for all five seasons of Charlie's Angels until 1981, also portraying the Garrett character in a cameo in the 2003 feature film Charlie's Angels: Full Throttle and later in the 2019 film Charlie's Angels.

In 1977 on the first episode of the Aaron Spelling produced comedy, The San Pedro Beach Bums, the Bums try to recruit the women of Charlie's Angels to judge the Miss Harbor Beauty Contest. The "Angels" – Smith, Jackson and Ladd – guest-star as themselves.

Christina Chambers portrayed Smith in the 2004 television film Behind the Camera: The Unauthorized Story of Charlie's Angels.

=== Interim work ===
Smith's first two acting ventures outside the Angels mold (as an actress of note) was the CBS-TV movie of the week Escape from Bogen County in 1977, and Season 1 Episode 2 of "The Love Boat" (aired October 1, 1977) where she played Janette Bradford cruising solo while being watched by the private eye her husband hired. Then came a leading role in Joyce Haber's The Users with Tony Curtis and John Forsythe in 1978. In 1980, Smith starred with Robert Mitchum in the suspense thriller Nightkill. Following the cancellation of Charlie's Angels in 1981, Smith starred in the title role of the critically acclaimed television movie Jacqueline Bouvier Kennedy, earning her a Golden Globe nomination for Best Actress. In 1983, Smith starred as Jennifer Parker in the TV movie Rage of Angels, based on the novel by Sidney Sheldon. The film was the highest rated in the Nielsen ratings the week it aired. Smith reprised the role in the 1986 sequel, Rage of Angels: The Story Continues.

=== After Charlie's Angels ===
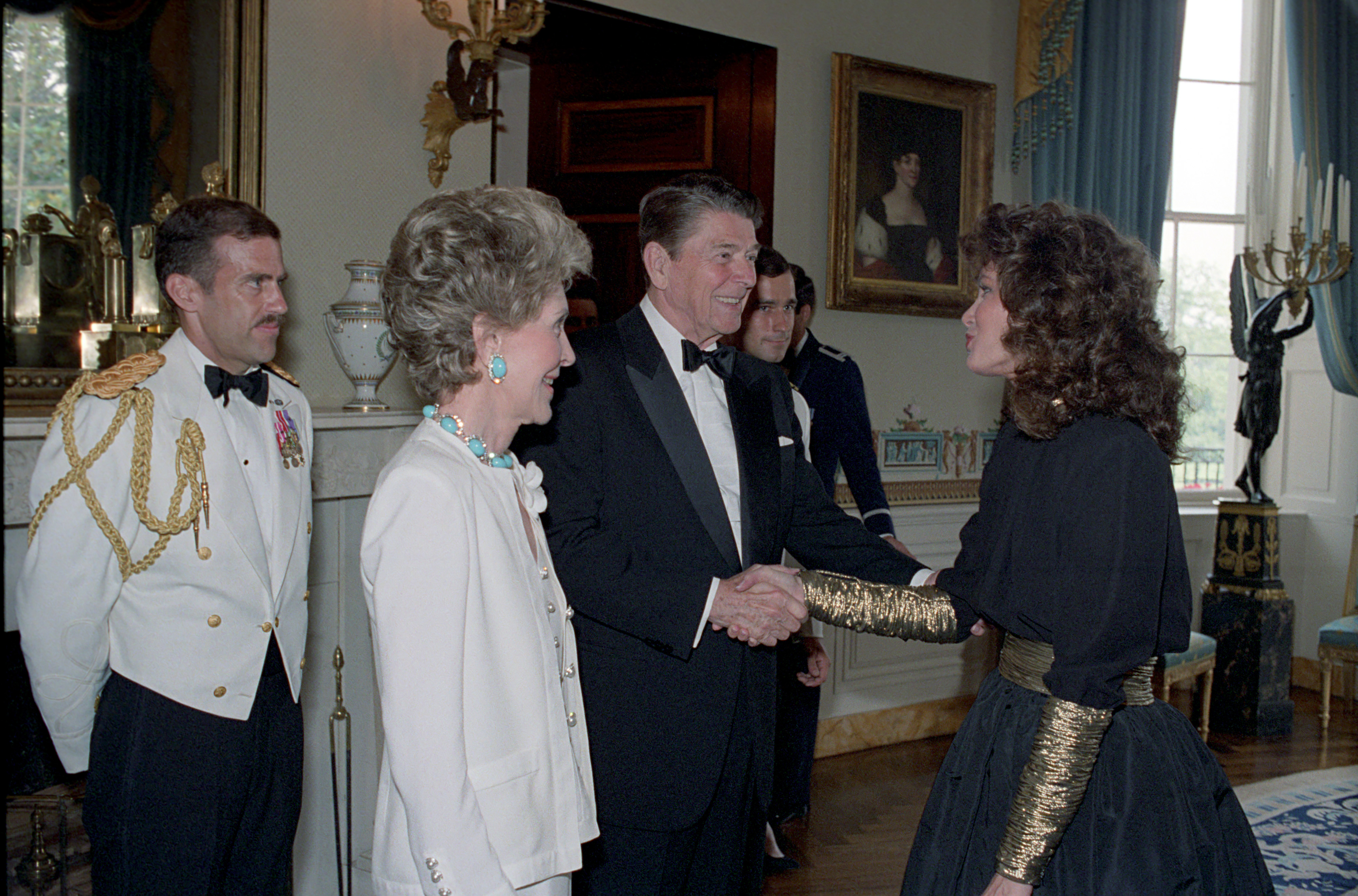
Smith greeting President Ronald Reagan and First Lady Nancy Reagan in 1986

Smith continued to appear in a number of television movies and miniseries during the 1980s and 1990s including George Washington (1984); The Night They Saved Christmas (1984); Florence Nightingale (1985); Windmills of the Gods (1988), another TV film based on a Sidney Sheldon novel; The Bourne Identity (1988), adapted from Robert Ludlum's novel of the same name; Settle the Score (1989); Lies Before Kisses (1991); The Rape of Dr. Willis (1991); In the Arms of a Killer (1992); and several TV versions of Danielle Steel novels, including Kaleidoscope (1990) and Family Album (1994).

In 1985, Smith starred in the feature film Deja Vu, directed by her then-husband Tony Richmond. In 1989, she played the title role in Christine Cromwell, a mystery television series based in San Francisco that only lasted one season. That same year, she received a star on the Hollywood Walk of Fame.

From 2002 to 2004, Smith had a recurring role as Vanessa Cavanaugh in the TV series The District. She reprised her role as Kelly Garrett for a cameo in the 2003 feature film Charlie's Angels: Full Throttle, the only "angel" from the original series to appear in a film adaptation. In August 2006, Smith reunited with her angels co-stars Farrah Fawcett and Kate Jackson at the 58th Primetime Emmy awards in tribute to producer Aaron Spelling who had died earlier that year. Her appearance there subsequently led Bravo TV's producers to cast Smith as the celebrity host of Bravo's weekly competitive reality series Shear Genius, which began airing in March 2007. Smith hosted the show for its first two seasons.

In March 2010, Smith returned to acting after a five-year absence with a guest role on the NBC television drama Law & Order: Special Victims Unit. In March 2012, Smith guest-starred on CSI: Crime Scene Investigation as Olivia Hodges, the mother of David Hodges (played by Wallace Langham).

In January 2019, Smith was seen promoting the Charlie's Angels television series on the MeTV network. She reprised her role as Kelly for a cameo appearance in the 2019 feature film Charlie's Angels, Smith's second cameo in the film franchise.

=== Designing ===
In 1985, Smith entered the business world with the introduction of her collection of women's apparel for Kmart. She pioneered the concept of celebrities developing their own brands rather than merely endorsing others. A season 15 episode of The Simpsons ("The Fat and the Furriest") lampooned Smith's many business successes, portraying her as having her own line of axe heads. In May 2009, Smith allowed a documentary crew to profile her home life, design philosophy and relationship with Kmart in an online video series sponsored by Kmart. Her foray into home furnishings was extended to Kmart stores in the fall of 2008, with the chain's introduction of its Jaclyn Smith Today product line of bedding and bath accessories.

In September 2008, Smith launched the STYLE by Jaclyn Smith wig collection for Paula Young Wigs. The wigs are designed by hair stylist José Eber. In 2024, she had a line of beautiful woman's clothing for sale on the Home Shopping channel (HSN).

== Personal life ==
Smith has been married four times. Her first marriage was to actor Roger Davis (1968–1975). She was married to Dennis Cole, who appeared on several episodes of Charlie's Angels, from 1978-1981. After they divorced, Smith remained close to Dennis's son, Joe, from a previous marriage. Joe was murdered in 1991 at the age of 30 during an attempted robbery, a crime which remains unsolved. In 1981, Smith married filmmaker Tony Richmond, with whom she had two children, Gaston (b. 1982) and Spencer Margaret (b. 1985), before divorcing Richmond in 1989. Smith has been married to Houston cardiothoracic surgeon, Brad Allen, since 1997.

Smith was treated for breast cancer in 2003. In 2010, Smith was featured in 1 a Minute, a documentary about breast cancer.

Smith released a memoir, I Once Knew a Guy Named Charlie, in 2026.

== Filmography ==
=== Films ===
Year	Film	Role	Other notes
1969	Goodbye, Columbus	Wedding Guest	Uncredited role
1970	The Adventurers	Girl journalist Belinda	
1972	Probe	Stewardess	Television film
1974	Bootleggers	Sally Fannie Tatum	
1974	Sin, American Style	Susan Cole	TV movie
1976	The Whiz Kid and the Carnival Caper	Cathy Martin	TV movie
1977	Escape from Bogen County	Maggie Bowman	TV movie
1978	The Users	Elena Scheider	TV movie
1980	Nightkill	Katherine Atwell	
1981	Jacqueline Bouvier Kennedy	Jacqueline Kennedy	TV movie Nominated - Golden Globe Award for Best Actress – Miniseries or Television Film
1983	Rage of Angels	Jennifer Parker	Miniseries
1984	Sentimental Journey	Julie Ross-Gardner	TV movie
1984	George Washington	Sally Fairfax	Miniseries
1984	The Night They Saved Christmas	Claudia Baldwin	TV movie
1985	Florence Nightingale	Florence Nightingale	TV movie
1985	Déjà Vu	Brooke/Maggie	
1986	Rage of Angels: The Story Continues	Jennifer Parker	Miniseries
1988	Windmills of the Gods	Mary Ashley	Miniseries
1988	The Bourne Identity	Marie St. Jacques	Miniseries
1989	Settle the Score	Katherine Whately	TV movie
1990	Kaleidoscope	Hilary Walker	TV movie
1991	Lies Before Kisses	Elaine Sanders	TV movie
1991	The Rape of Doctor Willis	Kate Willis	TV movie
1992	In the Arms of a Killer	Maria Quinn	TV movie
1992	Nightmare in the Daylight	Megan Lambert	TV movie
1992	Love Can Be Murder	Elizabeth Bentley	TV movie
1994	Cries Unheard: The Donna Yaklich Story	Donna Yaklich	TV movie
1994	Family Album	Faye Price Thayer	TV movie
1996	My Very Best Friend	Dana Griffin	TV movie
1997	Married to a Stranger	Megan Potter	TV movie
1998	Before He Wakes	Bridget Smith Michaels	TV movie
1999	Free Fall	Renee Brennan	TV movie
1999	Three Secrets	Diane	TV movie
2000	Navigating the Heart	Edith Iglauer	TV movie
2003	Charlie's Angels: Full Throttle	Kelly Garrett	Cameo
2005	Ordinary Miracles	Judge Kay Woodbury	TV movie
2015	Bridal Wave	Felice Hamilton	TV movie
2019	Charlie's Angels	Kelly Garrett	Cameo
2019	Random Acts of Christmas	Lauren Larkin	TV movie

=== Television series ===
Year(s)	Title	Role	Seasons	Notes
1976–1981	Charlie's Angels	Kelly Garrett / Dana Cameron	1–5	115 episodes (as Kelly Garrett); Episode: "Night of the Strangler" (as Dana Cameron)
1989–1990	Christine Cromwell	Christine Cromwell	1	4 episodes
2002–2004	The District	Vanessa Cavanaugh	3 & 4	13 episodes
2007–2009	Shear Genius	Host	1 & 2	19 episodes
2025	Doctor Odyssey	Delia	1	Episode: "Sophisticated Ladies Week"

=== Television appearances ===
Year	Title	Role	Episode titles	Notes
1970	The Partridge Family	Tina	"When Mother Gets Married"	Season 1, episode 5
1973	McCloud	Jackie Rogers	"Showdown at the End of the World"	Season 3, episode 4
1975	McCloud	Margaret 'Ellie' Hart	"The Man with the Golden Hat"	Season 5, episode 6
1975	Get Christie Love!	Sari Lancaster	"A Fashion Heist"	Season 1, episode 20
1975	Switch	Allie McGuiness	"Pilot Episode" AKA "Las Vegas Roundabout"	Pilot
1975	Switch	Allie McGuiness	"The Late Show Murders"	Season 1, episode 2
1975	Switch	Allie McGuiness	"Death Heist"	Season 1, episode 7
1975	The Rookies	Judy March	"The Code Five Affair"	Season 4, episode 15
1976	The Captain and Tennille Show	Herself		Season 1, episode 8
1977	The San Pedro Beach Bums	Herself	"The Angels and the Bums"	Season 1, episode 1
1977	The Love Boat	Janette Bradford	"A Tasteful Affair/Oh, Dale!/The Main Event"	Season 1, episode 2
2000	Becker	Megan	"The Wrong Man"	Season 3, episode 6
2001	Becker	Megan	"Pretty Poison"	Season 3, episode 14
2004	Hope & Faith	Dr. Anne Osvath	"Natal Attraction"	Season 2, episode 6
2004	Hope & Faith	Dr. Anne Osvath	"Stand by Your Mandi"	Season 2, episode 7
2006	Mornings with Kerri-Anne	Herself - Guest	TV series Australia, 1 episode	
2010	Law & Order: Special Victims Unit	Susan Delzio	"Bedtime"	Season 11, episode 18
2012	CSI: Crime Scene Investigation	Olivia Hodges	"Malice in Wonderland"	Season 12, episode 18
2012	CSI: Crime Scene Investigation	Olivia Hodges	"Homecoming"	Season 12, episode 22
2021	All American	Wendy Fine	"Ready or Not"	Season 3, episode 14
2023	All American	Wendy Fine	"Sabotage"	Season 5, episode 19
2024	All American	Wendy Fine	"Connection"	Season 6, episode 6
2024	All American	Wendy Fine	"I Do (Part II)"	Season 6, episode 15
2025	Doctor Odyssey	Cruise guest with terminal cancer	Episode “Sophisticated Ladies Week”	

== Tributes ==
- A number of style editorialists and magazine polls have attested to Smith's popularity and declared her one of the most beautiful women in the world. The difficult-to-please Mr. Blackwell once named her "The World's Best Dressed Woman". In 1979, McCall's ran a poll of "Whose Face Most Women Would Like To Have"; Smith topped the list.
- In the April 1984 issue of People, Smith was voted as having one of the "Ten Great Faces of Our Time".
- In 1985, McCall's named Smith as having one of "America's 10 Best Bodies". People named Smith twice in its annual list of the "Most Beautiful People in the World". Also in 1985, Ladies' Home Journal sampled 2,000 men and women in 100 locations in the United States to determine "America's Favorite Women"; Smith came top of the list as the "Most Beautiful Woman in America", with actress Linda Evans coming in second.
- In 1991, TV Guide readers voted Smith as the "Most Beautiful Woman Not on Television".
- The French band Air was inspired by Smith's Charlie's Angels character Kelly Garrett to record the song "Kelly Watch the Stars" for their critically acclaimed 1998 album Moon Safari, and the track was released as a single.
