= Nightkill =

1980 German film directed by Ted Post

- Official Swedish theatrical one-sheet
- Directed by: Ted Post
- Screenplay by: Joan Andre
- Story by: John Case
- Produced by: David Gil; Richard Hellman
- Starring: Jaclyn Smith; Mike Connors; James Franciscus; Robert Mitchum; Fritz Weaver; Sybil Danning; Belinda Mayne
- Cinematography: Anthony B. Richmond
- Edited by: Gary Griffin; Patrick McMahon
- Music by: Günther Fischer
- Production company: Cine Artists GmbH
- Distributed by: Avco Embassy Pictures
- Release date: December 18, 1980 (U.S.)
- Running time: 97 minutes
- Countries: United States; West Germany
- Language: English
- Budget: $4 million

Nightkill is a 1980 psychological thriller film directed by Ted Post, and starring Jaclyn Smith, Mike Connors, James Franciscus, Robert Mitchum, Fritz Weaver, and Sybil Danning. It follows the wife of a corrupt Phoenix, Arizona industrialist, who finds herself attempting to cover up his murder after her lover poisons him to death.

The film was produced by the German production company Cine Artists GmbH, in association with American distributor Avco Embassy Pictures. It was filmed on location in Arizona in the spring of 1980, with additional shooting taking place in Berlin. The film marked Jaclyn Smith's first major film role following her lead on the popular television series Charlie's Angels. Smith, who met the film's cinematographer, Anthony B. Richmond, while shooting the project, married him the following year. Mitchum's role is touted in Nightkill's promotion and credits, though his role in the film is minor with minimal screentime.

Avco Embassy intended to release Nightkill theatrically in the United States in the fall of 1980, but its theatrical release never materialized. Instead, it aired on television as an NBC Movie of the Week in December 1980 before it was released on home video, marketed as a slasher film. The film did, however, receive theatrical releases in some international markets, including Sweden and Turkey.

Nightkill has received some retrospective critical praise for its performances and atmosphere. Some critics and film scholars have also cited the film as an example of the neo-noir genre.

== Plot ==
Kathy Atwell, an unfulfilled Phoenix, Arizona housewife, has been carrying on an affair with Steve Fulton, the assistant of her industrialist husband, Wendell. Unbeknownst to Kathy, her liaisons with Steve at her luxurious hillside home are being audio recorded. Knowing that a million dollars in cash has been stashed by Wendell in an airport locker, Steve plots behind Kathy's back to poison Wendell, then impersonate him on a scheduled flight to Washington, D.C. to make it appear that he is still alive. Kathy unwittingly witnesses the poisoning, which kills Wendell.

When Steve reveals his plot, a panicked Kathy contemplates calling the police, but is convinced by him to keep Wendell's death a secret. Steve stores Wendell's corpse in a freezer before giving Kathy the key to the locker and departing for the airport to take the scheduled flight. That night, a shaken Kathy attends a charity event where she is honored for her philanthropic efforts helping troubled adolescents. Herbert Childs, Kathy's attorney and friend, drunkenly visits her after the event, but departs when she rebuffs his romantic advances.

The following morning, Kathy is visited by Lt. Donner, who reveals that Wendell's secretary, Christine, reported him missing after he failed to phone her as planned. Kathy inspects the freezer and finds Steve's dead body inside, and Wendell's inexplicably missing. Monika, Herbert's wife, who presented Kathy with her award the previous night, later arrives, but angrily leaves after noticing evidence that Herbert visited the house, leading her to believe that he and Kathy are having an affair.

Kathy drives to an abandoned mining camp on the outskirts of the city and dumps Steve's body down a mine shaft. Donner returns that night and continues to question Kathy about Wendell's disappearance, causing her to become evasive. That evening, Kathy books a flight to Denver. In the airport, she overhears a page on the intercom for Wendell, and glimpses a man resembling him at a bar, causing her to flee. In the parking lot, she is pursued by the man, driving Wendell's Rolls-Royce. The driver chases Kathy to an isolated cement plant, where Kathy crashes and the assailant pulls her from her car, unconscious, before hiding her vehicle behind pallets of concrete cinderblocks.

Kathy awakens the following morning on her living room floor. She calls Herbert, who agrees to visit her the next day. Later that night, Kathy senses that she is not alone in the house. After finding her pet dog's severed head in a cabinet and her pet monkeys dead, she stumbles upon Wendell's corpse, posed in his desk chair. Fleeing outside, she is met by Donner, who reveals that Wendell had hired private investigator Kelly Rodriguez to place recording devices in the house in an attempt to document evidence of her and Steve's affair. Donner says that he has listened to the recordings, which serve as evidence of Kathy's culpability, and that she could be charged as an accessory to murder for her failure to report Wendell's death to authorities.

When Donner asks if Kathy has an attorney, she refers him to Herbert. Donner requests that she provide him the key to the locker, which will need to be handed over to the police. At Donner's suggestion, Kathy goes to shower before the two depart to the police station, while he feigns a call to the district attorney. Donner is in fact Kelly Rodriguez, and has used the information that he has obtained to terrorize Kathy and steal Wendell's fortune for himself.

While Kathy bathes in her shower, Rodriguez barricades her in by tying rope around the doorhandles and tampers with the water heater, causing the water to scald Kathy. After Kathy loses consciousness, Rodriguez removes her from the shower and departs for the airport. Upon retrieving the money from the locker, Rodriguez is questioned by a police officer, and claims to be Steve. The disbelieving officer relents when Rodriguez offers him hush money. While Rodriguez absconds with Wendell's fortune, a severely burned Kathy, clinging to life, manages to phone police for help.

== Cast ==
- Jaclyn Smith as Katherine "Kathy" Atwell
- Robert Mitchum as Lieutenant Donner / Kelly Rodriguez
- James Franciscus as Steve Fulton
- Mike Connors as Wendell Atwell
- Fritz Weaver as Herbert Childs
- Sybil Danning as Monika Childs
- Tina Menard as Consuela
- Belinda Mayne as Christine
- Michael Anderson Jr. as Lieutenant Donner
- Melanie MacQueen as Alice

== Production ==
=== Development ===
The film was directed by Ted Post, who had previously mainly worked as a television director for the series Peyton Place before directing the western film Hang 'Em High (1968) and the drama The Harrad Experiment (1973).

=== Casting ===
Jaclyn Smith and Robert Mitchum's casting in the film was announced in February 1980. The film marked Smith's first major feature role outside her leading role on the television series Charlie's Angels. James Franciscus and Mike Conners were subsequently cast the following month. Angus Scrimm was cast in a minor part, having previously starred in Avco Embassy's box-office hit Phantasm (1979), though his scenes were ultimately deleted from the final cut.

=== Filming ===
Nightkill was originally planned to be shot in Dallas, Texas, but instead took place in Phoenix, Arizona, with establishing photography beginning on March 31, 1980. Principal photography began between April 7 and April 14, 1980. Its production budget was estimated at $4 million. The film was funded by the German company Cine Artists GMBH, and featured a mainly British crew. Anthony B. Richmond, the cinematographer, had previously shot several films for Nicolas Roeg, including Don't Look Now (1973), The Man Who Fell to Earth (1976), and Bad Timing (1980). The film went into production during a major strike by the Screen Actors Guild, and was one of the few films that were permitted to be shot during the time, alongside The Burning (1981), Fade to Black (1980), and The Howling (1981).

A private residence on Camelback Mountain was used as a central filming location for the Atwell residence, which was leased to the production for two months at a cost of $20,000. Following the completion of filming in the home, its owners told The Arizona Republic that that the production killed numerous houseplants due to the use of hot film lights and that "close to 100" pieces of wooden furniture had to be repaired, in addition to the home needing recarpeting and repainting. Additional photography occurred at the Phoenix Zoo, the Salt River Project facility, Sky Harbor International Airport, and rural desert locations in the Tempe area. Some interiors were filmed in Berlin, Germany.

Mitchum was scheduled to shoot his part in the film over a period of ten days. Commenting on his participation in the film, Mitchum said: "I figured we'd spend three weeks in Arizona. It wouldn't tie me up for too long. They'd pay me by the hour."

While making the film, Smith began a relationship with cinematographer Richmond, whom she married the following year. Smith recalled of her infatuation with Richmond on the set: "I saw this man literally paint with light—and I liked his looks the minute I saw him." Post recalled that the romance between the two had begun shortly into filming, and that Richmond was often inebriated throughout the shoot, causing him to occasionally fumble shots and camera angles.

Smith was originally asked to appear nude in the film during its shower sequence finale, but she refused. Commenting to a journalist during filming, she said: "I'll never take my clothes off in front of the camera. Believe me, I wasn't cavorting around naked in front of the cameras, although it may look that way... I'm not ashamed of my body, but audiences like to use their imagination."

== Release ==
Nightkill was produced by Cine Artists GmbH in association with distributor Avco Embassy Pictures, who intended it for a U.S. theatrical release in the fall of 1980. On December 9, 1980, it was reported that Avco Embassy had instead sold the film's rights for television broadcast on NBC. The film aired ten days later on NBC as the Movie of the Week on December 18, 1980. It did, however, receive theatrical releases in international markets, premiering in Sweden on January 22, 1982. In Turkey, the film was subsequently released theatrically as Gece Katilleri.

The film aired on British television on April 20, 1985, as part of Central's Saturday night programming.

=== Home media ===
A pre-certification videocasette of the film was released in the United Kingdom by Vipco in 1981. The film was marketed as a slasher film, featuring artwork showing star Jaclyn Smith screaming in a shower.

Kino Lorber released the film on DVD and Blu-ray in 2017, featuring a new interview with Smith, as well as an audio commentary with film historians Howard S. Berger and Nathaniel Thompson.

== Reception ==
In Horror and Science Fiction Films III (1981-1983), writer Donald C. Willis favorably described the film as "a perfect-crime suspenser." Leonard Maltin was less enthusiastic, deeming Nightkill a "confused suspense drama" and awarding it two and a half out of four stars. Critic Robert J. Pardi, reviewing the film in Movies on TV, 1988-1989, also awarded it two and a half out of four stars, describing it as "a brutal suspense-thriller." Ron Castell, writing in the 1995 Blockbuster Video Guide, similarly described the film as a "muddled suspenser" but conceded that it "has a few bright moments toward the end and pleasing Arizona scenery."

Assessing the film in a retrospective review for its Blu-ray release, Michael Barrett of PopMatters noted stylistic elements of film noir in Nightkill, summarizing: "This deceptively marketed film is no masterpiece, yet some may appreciate its arid atmosphere of downbeat nightmare." Ian Jane of DVD Talk wrote: "Nightkill is by no means a great movie but it has its interesting elements, most of which stem around the cast. If the story is a bit predictable, it is at least reasonably well paced and occasionally tense enough to keep us watching."

The film website Film Frenzy awarded it two out of five stars, deeming it a "lackluster thriller that begins promisingly before repeatedly hitting the “snooze” button." Lee Pfeiffer of the film website Cinema Retro noted that "Nightkill may be middling in some aspects but it does take some unexpected turns concerning the motivations of the main characters," and added that the "Arizona locations are a refreshing change of pace and the film keeps a zesty pace under Post's direction, right up until the rather surprising ending which some viewers may find unsatisfying."

== Sources ==
- Berger, Howard S.; Thompson, Nathaniel (2017). Nightkill (Blu-ray audio commentary). Kino Lorber. OCLC 1020707392.
- Castell, Ron (1994). Blockbuster Video Guide to Movies and Videos 1995. New York City, New York: Random House. ISBN 978-0-440-21766-4.
- Freese, Gene (2019). The Western Films of Robert Mitchum: Hollywood's Cowboy Rebel. Jefferson, North Carolina: McFarland. ISBN 978-1-476-67849-8.
- Grant, John (2023) [2013]. A Comprehensive Encyclopedia of Film Noir: The Essential Reference Guide. Milwaukee, Wisconsin: Limelight Editions. ISBN 978-1-493-08165-3.
- Maltin, Leonard (2008). Leonard Maltin's 2009 Movie Guide. New York City, New York: Penguin Books. ISBN 978-0-452-28978-9.
- Mitchum, John (1989). Them Ornery Mitchum Boys: The Adventures of Robert and John Mitchum. Pacifica, California: Creatures at Large. ISBN 978-0-940-06407-2.
- Pardi, Robert J. (1987). Scheuer, Steven H. (ed.). Movies on TV, 1988-1989 (11th ed.). New York City, New York: Bantam Books. ISBN 978-0-553-26851-5.
- Plaskin, Glenn (1992). Turning Point: Pivotal Moments in the Lives of Celebrities. New York City, New York: Carol Publishing Group. ISBN 978-1-559-72138-7.
- Spicer, Andrew (2010). Historical Dictionary of Film Noir. Lanham, Maryland: Scarecrow Press. ISBN 978-0-810-87378-0.
- Willis, Donald C. (1984). Horror and Science Fiction Films III (1981-1983). Vol. 3. Lanham, Maryland: Scarecrow Press. ISBN 978-0-810-81723-4.
