= Henry Colman =

American producer and screenwriter

- Born: Henry Cohen; September 15, 1923; Altoona, Pennsylvania, U.S.
- Died: November 7, 2012 (aged 89); Los Angeles, California
- Education: Altoona High School
- Alma mater: University of Michigan
- Occupations: Producer, screenwriter
- Years active: 1949–1993
- Spouse: Donna Brainard

Henry Colman (September 9, 1923 – November 7, 2012) was an American producer and screenwriter.

== Early life ==
Colman was born Henry Cohen in Altoona, Pennsylvania to Canadian-Russian parents Abe, a businessman, and Jenny, a homemaker. He had an older brother and sister. Colman attended and graduated from Altoona Area High School. He then spent two years at the University of Michigan before in 1943 being drafted into the Army Air Force, where he served for two years as a navigator on B-29 bombers. Colman then attended Columbia University, where he received a bachelor's degree in theatre.

== Career ==
After graduating from Columbia Colman worked as a lighting assistant in various colleges, becoming lighting director and also doing some acting. In 1949, Colman auditioned at a Los Angeles theatre, but got a job as stage manager working on three plays.

Colman then worked as a reporter for a Weekly Trade Paper.

In 1950s–1970s, Colman worked on the NBC show Kraft Television Theatre as a production coordinator, and on Dr. Kildare as an associate producer. He also worked on the American prime-time soap opera Peyton Place from 1965.

In 1970s–1980s, Colman worked on television films, including the two Love Boat television films. In 1977, he worked as a producer on The Love Boat for the first seven seasons. He left to produce the television series Hotel.

Colman continued to work on television films including The Rape of Dr. Willis, In the Shadows, Someone's Watching and Nightmare in the Daylight. He retired in 1993.

== Death ==
Colman died in November 2012 at his home in Los Angeles, California, at the age of 89.
