= Déjà Vu (1985 film) =

- Directed by: Anthony B. Richmond
- Written by: Anthony B. Richmond; Ezra D. Rappaport; Arnold Schmidt
- Based on: The novel Always by Trevor Meldal-Johnsen
- Produced by: Yoram Globus; Menahem Golan
- Starring: Jaclyn Smith; Nigel Terry; Shelley Winters; Claire Bloom
- Cinematography: David Holmes
- Edited by: Richard Trevor
- Music by: Pino Donaggio
- Production company: Cannon Films
- Distributed by: The Cannon Group
- Release date: 1985
- Running time: 90 minutes
- Countries: United Kingdom; Italy
- Languages: English; Italian

Déjà Vu is a 1985 British drama film produced by Cannon Films. The film, an adaptation of the novel Always by Trevor Meldal-Johnsen, is a reincarnation love story, directed by Anthony B. Richmond, and written by Richmond, Ezra D. Rappaport, and Arnold Anthony Schmidt. The film stars Jaclyn Smith, Claire Bloom, Nigel Terry and Shelley Winters.

== Cast ==
- Jaclyn Smith as Brooke
- Nigel Terry as Michael
- Shelley Winters as Olga Nabokova
- Claire Bloom as Eleanor Harvey
- Richard Kay as William Tanner (1935)
- Frank Gatliff as William Tanner (1984)
- Michael Ladkin as Willmer
- David Lewin as Reporter
- Marianne Stone as Mabel
- Virginia Guy as Lead Dancer
- David Adams as Chauffeur
- Josephine Buchan as Research Assistant
- Richard Graydon as Captain Wilson
- Claire Bayliss as Dancer
- Elizabeth Cantillon as Dancer
- Robin James as Dancer
- Philippa Luce as Dancer
- Wendy Roe as Dancer
