= The French Atlantic Affair =

- First edition (publ. Atheneum Books)
- Based on: The French Atlantic Affair by Ernest Lehman
- Written by: Douglas Heyes
- Directed by: Douglas Heyes
- Starring: Telly Savalas; Chad Everett; Michelle Phillips; Shelley Winters; Horst Buchholz
- Music by: John Addison
- Country of origin: United States
- Original language: English

Production
- Cinematography: Ralph Woolsey
- Editors: Tom Stevens; Jamie Caylor
- Running time: 278 minutes
- Production companies: Aaron Spelling Productions; MGM Television

Original release
- Release: November 15 – November 18, 1979

The French Atlantic Affair was a 3-part TV miniseries produced and broadcast in 1979, based on is the 1977 novel of the same title by Ernest Lehman.

== Plot ==
A luxury ocean liner, the SS Marseilles of the French Atlantic Line, is hijacked by Father Dunleavy, a messianic priest, and his cult followers for a $70 million ransom in gold. Harold Columbine, a novelist, and Charles Girodt, the ship's captain, attempt to save the lives of the passengers, some of whom are also members of the group.

Two young amateur radio enthusiasts are the only link between the ship and the outside world. The SS Marseilles was based on the ocean liner SS France (1961) of the French Line.

In the novel, the hijackers were a group of employees laid off by NASA and its contractors after the termination of the Apollo program. The amateur radio operators were a passenger (not a member of the terrorist group), and his on-shore friend, both of whom were physicians.

== Cast ==
- Jean-Pierre Aumont as Chief Jean-Claude Raffin
- Horst Buchholz as Dr. Chabot
- James Coco as George Sauvinage
- Chad Everett as Harold Columbine
- José Ferrer as President Aristide Brouchard
- John Houseman as Dr. Archady Clemens
- Carolyn Jones as Peg
- Richard Jordan as Julian Wunderlicht
- Louis Jourdan as Captain Charles Girodt
- Michelle Phillips as Jennie Barber
- Marie-France Pisier as Lisa
- Donald Pleasence as Max Dechambre
- John Rubinstein as Herb Kleinfeld
- Telly Savalas as Father Dunleavy
- Stella Stevens as Louise Crawford
- Shelley Winters as Helen Wabash
- Lance LeGault as Lester Foyles
- William Lucking as Don Crawford
- Nehemiah Persoff as Col. Schreiner
- Dane Clark as Admiral J. Elton Knox
- Richard Anderson as Terrence Crown
- Corinne Calvet as Madame Brouchard
- Harvey Jason as Plessier
- Dana Hill as Maggie Joy
- Army Archerd as Stanford Whitman
- M. Emmet Walsh as Harry
- Arielle Dombasle as Hotel Operator
- Roger Til as Devillaine
- James Jeter as Al

== Production ==
Exteriors and scenes on deck in the miniseries were shot in the Caribbean aboard Carnival Cruise Lines's SS Festivale. The liner retained its name and markings in the series, though it was said to be owned by the fictional French Atlantic Line. The vessel in the novel is called the SS Marseilles and is based upon the French Line's SS France. Interiors were shot on soundstages and in Long Beach, California aboard the RMS Queen Mary. The film also shot on location in Paris and surrounding areas.

== Literature ==
- Ernest Lehmann: The French Atlantic Affair Atheneum, New York 1977, ISBN 0-689-10803-6
