= Ella Leffland =

American writer (1931–2024)

Novelist Ella Leffland speaks with Sarah Broderick at The Sitting Room in 2014, photo by Carol Sklenicka

Ella Leffland (November 25, 1931 – September 18, 2024) was an American novelist and short story writer. Highly regarded by other writers, her novels demonstrate stunning mastery of the techniques of realistic fiction; but Leffland uses her facility to illuminate characters whose imaginative lives are rich and often strange. The settings of most of her works are in northern California, where she grew up; she is perhaps best known for her semi-autobiographical novel Rumors of Peace (1979; reprinted as a "rediscovered classic" in 2011) about a girl coming of age during World War II. The fascination with personal and social evil that Leffland explores in Rumors of Peace emerges powerfully in her ambitious historical novel based on the life of Hermann Göring, Knight, Death and the Devil, published in 1990.

== Biography ==
Leffland was born and raised in Martinez, California. She attended San Jose State University. Her story "Last Courtesies", published in Harper's Magazine, won an O. Henry Award First Prize in 1977. She has written five novels and a collection of short stories, including Mrs. Munck (1970), a gothic tale of a woman's vengeance on the man who abandoned her decades before, made into a film adapted, directed, and starring Diane Ladd. She has also written book reviews for The New York Times Book Review.

Leffland won the 2014 Gina Berriault Award from Fourteen Hills Review at San Francisco State University. Leffland resided and continued to write in San Francisco.

Leffland died on September 18, 2024, at the age of 92.

== Bibliography ==
- Mrs. Munck (1970)
- Love Out of Season (1974)
- Rumors of Peace (1979)
- Last Courtesies and Other Stories (1980)
- The Knight, Death and the Devil (1990)
- Breath and Shadows (1999)
