= Shelley Winters =

American actress (1920–2006)

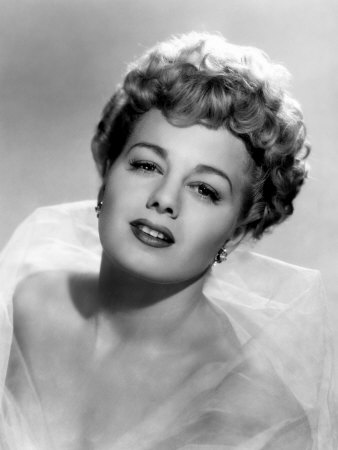
- Winters in 1951
- Born: Shirley Schrift; August 18, 1920; St. Louis, Missouri, U.S.
- Died: January 14, 2006 (aged 85); Beverly Hills, California, U.S.
- Resting place: Hillside Memorial Park Cemetery
- Education: The New School
- Occupation: Actress
- Years active: 1936–1999
- Spouses: Mack Paul Mayer (m. 1943; div. 1948) Vittorio Gassman (m. 1952; div. 1954) Anthony Franciosa (m. 1957; div. 1960) Gerry DeFord (m. 2006)
- Children: 1

Shelley Winters (born Shirley Schrift; August 18, 1920 – January 14, 2006) was an American actress, whose film career spanned seven decades. In 1943 she changed her name to Shelley, after her favorite poet, and Winter(s) taking her mother's maiden name. She won two Academy Awards for The Diary of Anne Frank (1959) and A Patch of Blue (1965), and received Oscar nominations for A Place in the Sun (1951) and The Poseidon Adventure (1972). She was also a Golden Globe Award winner for the Poseidon Adventure (out of six nominations), a Primetime Emmy Award winner, and a two-time BAFTA Award nominee. She was an active member of the Actors Studio.

Winters starred in the Broadway musical Oklahoma!. After a string of minor roles, she had a breakthrough role in A Double Life (1947), quickly rising to leading lady status. She was initially typified as the "blond bombshell" archetype, but balked at typecasting, and became known for her versatility as a performer. Some of her other well-known films include The Night of the Hunter (1955), Lolita (1962), Alfie (1966), Next Stop, Greenwich Village (1976), and Pete's Dragon (1977).

Winters also acted extensively on television, including a tenure as Nana Mary on the sitcom Roseanne. She wrote three autobiographies. In 1960, she received a star on the Hollywood Walk of Fame for her contributions to the film industry.

== Early life ==
Shelley Winters was born Shirley Schrift in St. Louis, Missouri, the daughter of Rose (née Winter, 1896–1966), a singer with St. Louis Municipal Opera Theatre ("The Muny"), and Jonas Schrift (1890–1955), a designer of men's clothing. Her parents were Jewish; her father was Ukrainian-Jewish and migrated from Grzymałów, Galicia, Austria-Hungary, (later Ukraine), while her mother was born in St. Louis to Austrian-Jewish immigrants who were also from Grzymałów. Her parents were third cousins. Her Jewish education included attendance at the Jamaica Jewish Center and learning Hebrew songs at her public school. Her family moved to Brooklyn, New York, when she was nine years old, and she grew up partly in Queens and New York City city. She worked in the Garment District and did some modeling while she was still in high school. Already drawn to acting, she participated as a singer and dancer in a popular amateur revue, Pins and Needles, staged by the Garment workers union.

When Winters was just three her Zeideh [grandfather] taught her the lesson of the Talmudic Rabbi Hillel: "If I'm not for myself, then who is for me? But if I am only for myself, what am I?" It seems to have been her motivation for helping people when she worked in Woolworth.

While Winters was trying her hand at drama she worked in Woolworth's selling hardware. During her time there she led a strike for unrestricted access to women's toilets with other female workers. The strike was a success, but she lost her job as a result. Years later she pointed out that the padlocks were removed from the Woolworth's bathrooms due to her success as a union organizer.

As a young woman, she worked as a model. Her sister Blanche Schrift (1916–2000) later married George Boroff (1912–1968), who ran the Circle Theatre (since named El Centro Theatre) in Los Angeles, California. At age 16, Winters relocated to Los Angeles where, as a newcomer to Los Angeles, she lied to studio head Harry Cohn when she signed with Columbia, saying she was born two years earlier than she actually was. Later she returned to New York to study acting at the New School. In the late 1940s she shared an apartment with Marilyn Monroe.

== Career ==
=== 1940–1946: Broadway debut and early films ===
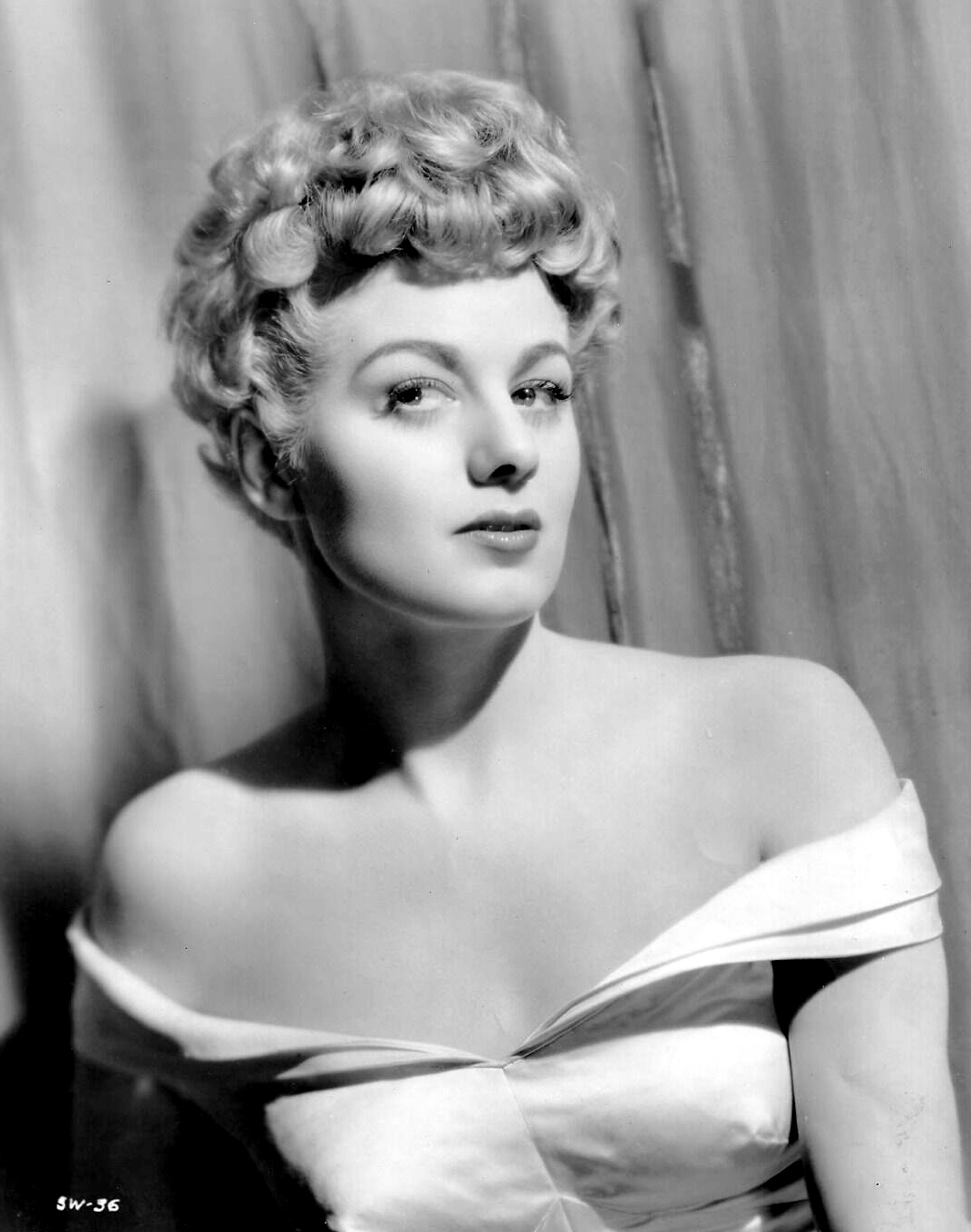
Studio publicity portrait of Winters c. 1940s

Winters made her Broadway debut in The Night Before Christmas (1941) which had a short run. She had a small part in Rosalinda, an adaptation of Die Fledermaus (1942–44) which ran for 611 performances. As Fifi in that show she drew the attention of Harry Cohn who noticed her attractiveness and comedic flare. He invited her to do a test, gave her a $150.00 contract, which led to her role in What a Woman! (1943), saying to Rosalind Russell: "You can't go in there now, miss." Meanwhile, Winters first received acclaim when she joined the cast of Oklahoma! in the role of Ado Annie, replacing Celeste Holm.

She received a long-term contract at Columbia and moved to Los Angeles. Winters' first film appearance was an uncredited bit in There's Something About a Soldier (1943) at Columbia. She had another small bit in What a Woman! (1943) but a bigger part in a B movie, Sailor's Holiday (1944). Winters was borrowed by the Producers Releasing Corporation for Knickerbocker Holiday (1944). Columbia put her in small bits in She's a Soldier Too (1944), Dancing in Manhattan (1944), Together Again (1944), Tonight and Every Night (1945), Escape in the Fog (1945), A Thousand and One Nights (1945), and The Fighting Guardsman (1946). Winters had bit parts in MGM's Two Smart People (1946), and a series of films for United Artists: Susie Steps Out (1946), Abie's Irish Rose (1946) and New Orleans (1947). She had bit parts in Living in a Big Way (1947) and Killer McCoy (1947) at MGM, The Gangster (1947) for King Brothers Productions and Red River (1948). She played Brenda Martingale in Siodmak's Cry of the City (1948).

=== 1947–1954: Breakthrough and acclaim ===
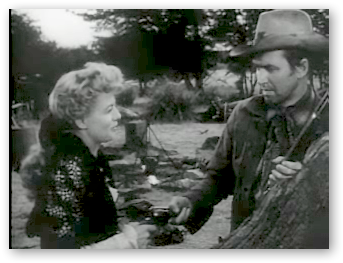
Winters with James Stewart in Winchester 73 (1950)

Winters first achieved stardom with her breakout performance as the victim of insane actor Tony John played by Ronald Colman in George Cukor's A Double Life (1947). It was distributed by Universal, which signed Winters to a long-term contract. She had a supporting role in Larceny (1948) then 20th Century Fox borrowed her for Cry of the City (1948). Winters was second-billed in Johnny Stool Pigeon (1949) with Howard Duff, and Take One False Step (1949) with William Powell. Paramount borrowed her to play Myrtle in The Great Gatsby (1949) with Alan Ladd. Back at Universal she was in Winchester 73 (1950), opposite James Stewart, a huge hit. Universal gave Winters top billing in South Sea Sinner (1950). She co-starred with Joel McCrea in Frenchie (1950).

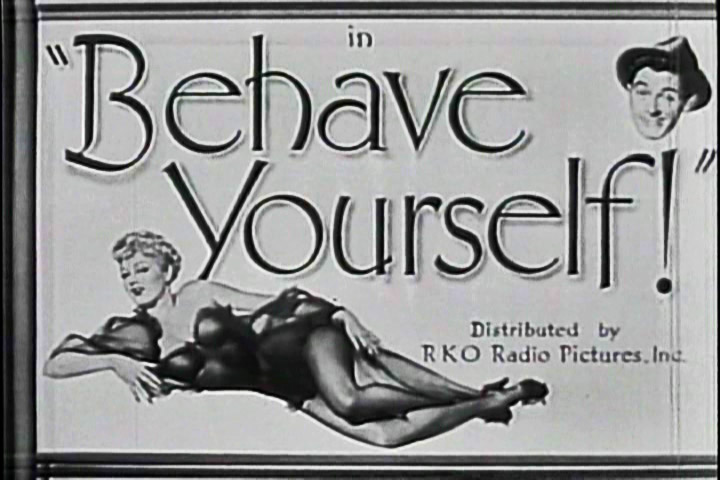
Title card of the movie Behave Yourself! (1951), featuring Winters

Winters originally broke into Hollywood films as a blonde bombshell type, but quickly tired of the role's limitations. She claims to have washed off her make-up to audition for the role of Alice Tripp, the factory girl, in A Place in the Sun, directed by George Stevens, now a landmark American film.

As the Associated Press reported, the general public was unaware of how serious a craftswoman Winters was. "Although she was in demand as a character actress, Winters continued to study her craft. She attended Charles Laughton's Shakespeare classes as well as the Hollywood Studio Club in Los Angeles and later studied and worked at the Method actors' haven Actors Studio in New York, both as student, moderator and teacher." While studying with Lee Strasberg at the Actors' Studio, she worked towards gaining the ability to reveal her inner self, to act with her scars. According to Winters, to get the best performance, one had to fight for it. She left Hollywood for Broadway and did not go back until 1959, when she had found her truer self. Lee Strasberg called Winters the actor of her generation; she could use his Method the most accurately. Winters also taught at the Circle in the Square and at colleges like Barnard. "UCLA has offered me a professorship -- not a full one -- and I never even finished high school!"

While on a publicity tour in 1950, she visited the two-year-old State of Israel. Also in the early 1950s, Winters rejected a trip to Germany to film the exterior scenes of the movie I Am a Camera. It reminded her too much of her uncle Yaekel who survived the Holocaust and his subsequent fruitless search for his family. A double was used in her place for the scenes needed to be shot in Germany.

Her performance in A Place in the Sun (1951), a departure from the sexpot image that her studio, Universal Pictures, was grooming her for at the time, brought Winters her first acclaim, earning her a nomination for the Academy Award for Best Actress. Winters went to United Artists for He Ran All the Way (1951) with John Garfield and RKO for Behave Yourself! (1951) with Farley Granger. Still in her blonde bombshell era, Winters was depicted on the film poster of Behave Yourself by pinup illustrator Alberto Vargas. She was top-billed in The Raging Tide (1951) at Universal. She was loaned to 20th Century Fox for Phone Call from a Stranger (1952), with Bette Davis.

At Universal she did Meet Danny Wilson (1952) with Frank Sinatra and Untamed Frontier (1952) with Joseph Cotten. She went to MGM for My Man and I (1952) with Ricardo Montalbán. She performed in A Streetcar Named Desire on stage in Los Angeles. Winters took some time off for the birth of her first child in 1953. She made her TV debut in "Mantrap" for The Ford Television Theatre in 1954. At MGM, she did Executive Suite (1954) and Tennessee Champ (1954), top-billed in the latter. Winters returned to Universal to appear in Saskatchewan (1954), shot on location in Canada with Alan Ladd and Playgirl (1954) with Barry Sullivan. She appeared in a TV version of Sorry, Wrong Number.

Winters traveled to Europe to make Mambo (1954) with Vittorio Gassman who became her husband. She then shot Cash on Delivery (1954) in England. Winters performed in a version of The Women for Producers' Showcase then had a key role in I Am a Camera (1955) starring opposite Julie Harris and Laurence Harvey. Even more highly acclaimed was Charles Laughton's 1955 The Night of the Hunter with Robert Mitchum and Lillian Gish. At Warner Bros, Winters was Jack Palance's leading lady in I Died a Thousand Times (1955), then for RKO she co starred with Rory Calhoun in The Treasure of Pancho Villa (1955). She was in The Big Knife (1955) for Robert Aldrich.

=== 1955–1969: Establishment ===
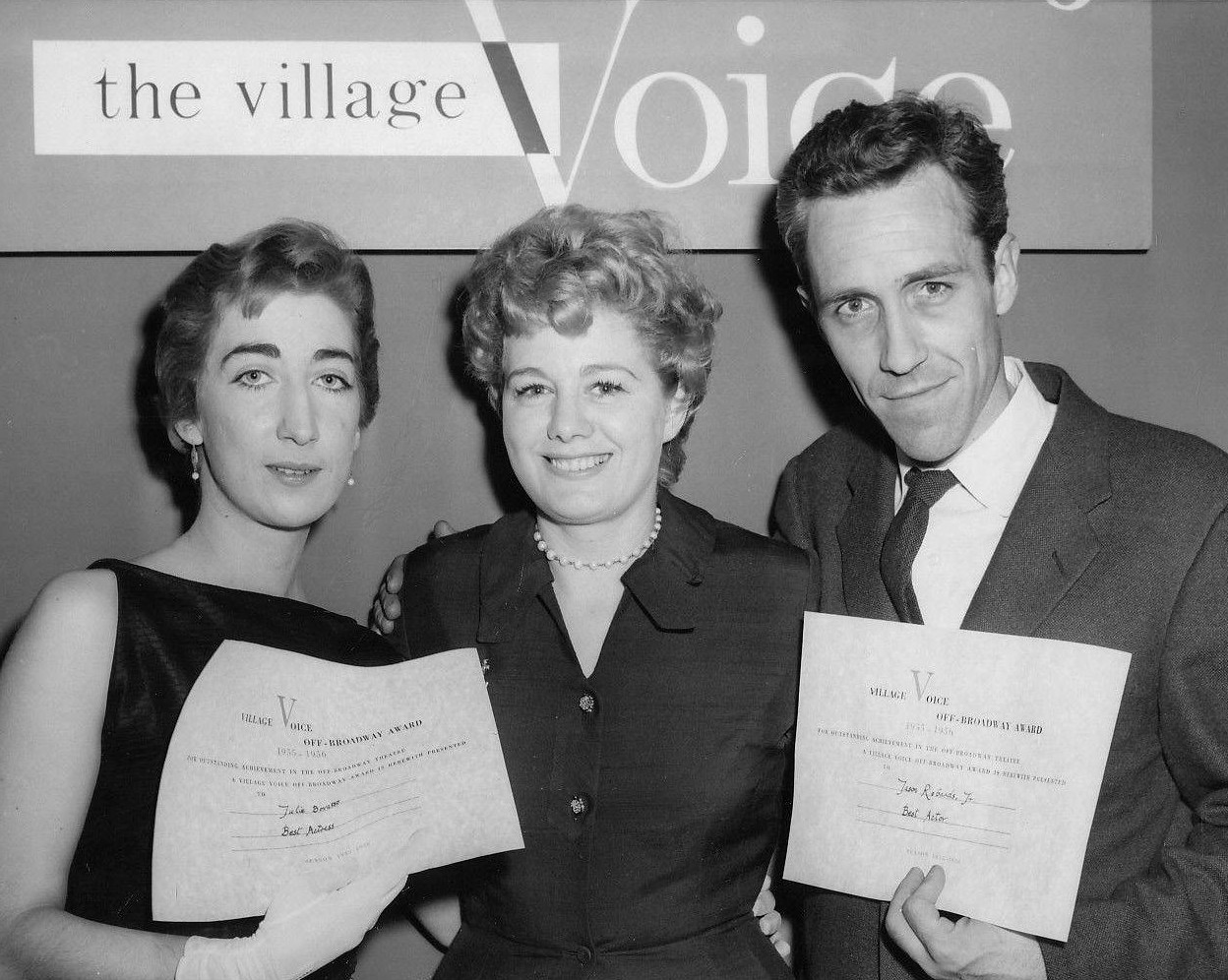
Winters with Julie Bovasso and Jason Robards, as the presenter of the first Obie Awards ceremony in 1956

Winters returned to Broadway in A Hatful of Rain, in 1955–1956, opposite Ben Gazzara and future husband Anthony Franciosa. It ran for 398 performances. Girls of Summer (1956–57) was directed by Jack Garfein and co-starred George Peppard but only ran for 56 performances. On TV she reprised her Double Life performance in The Alcoa Hour in 1957. She appeared in episodes of The United States Steel Hour, Climax!, Wagon Train, Schlitz Playhouse, The DuPont Show of the Month, and Kraft Theatre.

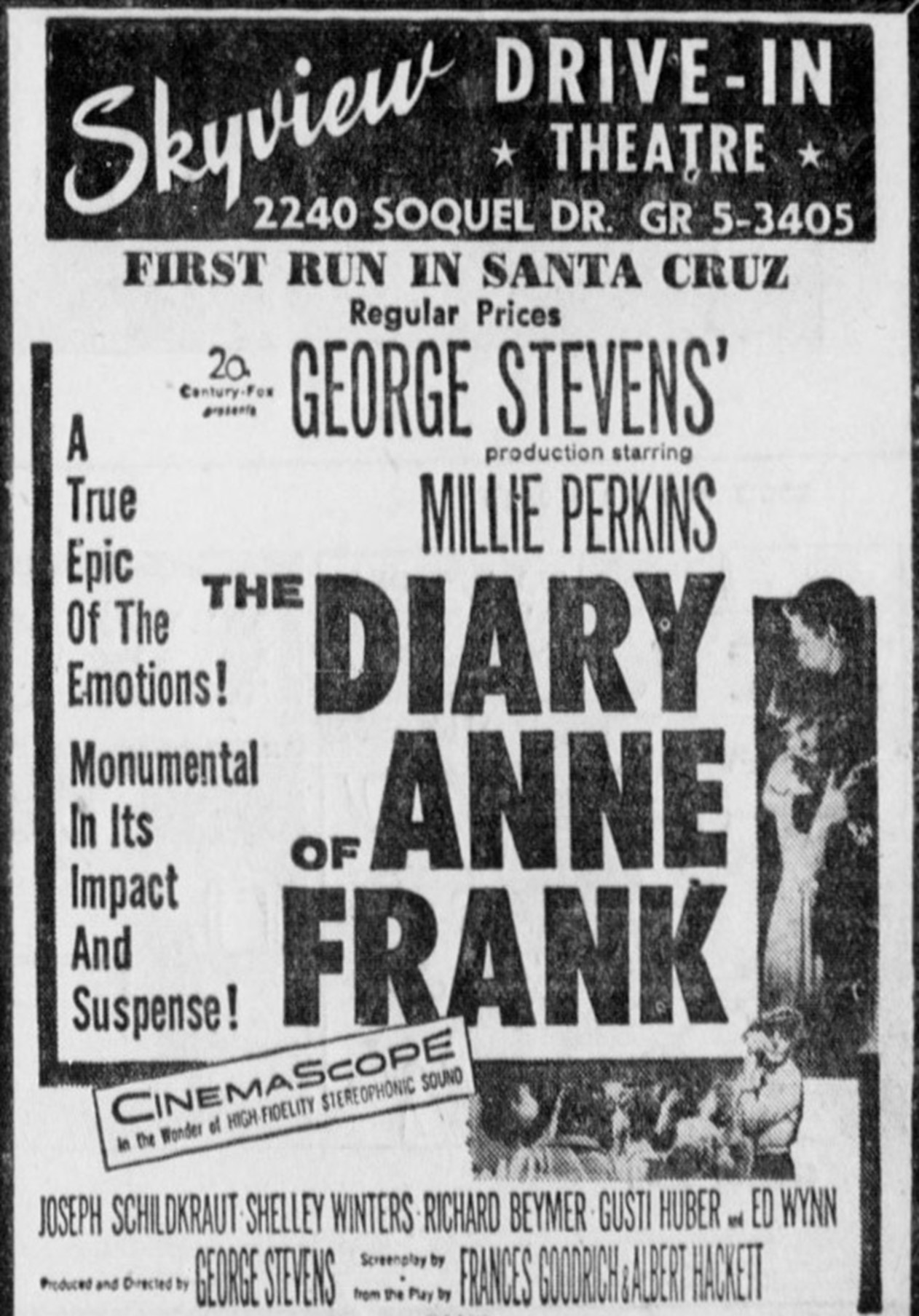
Diary of Anne Frank film 1960

In 1960, she won a Best Supporting Actress Oscar for her role as Mrs. Van Daan in George Stevens's film adaptation of The Diary of Anne Frank (1959). As Petronella van Daan, Winters emulated one of eight real-life Jewish refugees in the Netherlands during World War II who spent two years hiding in small attic quarters until they were betrayed and sent to Nazi death camps. She understood the significance of sharing Anne Frank's tragic story with its tough lessons of cruelty and dignity under duress, heightening her own awareness of antisemitism and the historic deep rooted past of Jewish suffering. In preparation for doing this film, the entire cast watched movies taken by the American soldiers who liberated the concentration camps. For Winters, she was never able to read or watch anything related to the Holocaust again. During the filming, she met Anne's father, Otto Frank. She promised him that in the event that she won an Oscar for that role, she would donate it to the Anne Frank Museum in Amsterdam. Making good on her promise Winters donated her award statuette to the Anne Frank House in Amsterdam in 1975. On the last day of shooting for the film, she spoke at an Israel bonds event that evening in Los Angeles. In her memoir she remembers asking the Jewish audience: "Who knows when you or your children or grandchildren will need the country of Israel?" The event raised millions of dollars. Winters called The Diary of Anne Frank her most important film. She attended its New York premiere accompanied by Harry Belafonte, Martin Luther King Jr., and their wives.

Winters was in much demand as a character actor now, getting good roles in Odds Against Tomorrow (1959), Let No Man Write My Epitaph (1960) and The Young Savages (1961). She received excellent reviews for her performance as the man-hungry Charlotte Haze in Stanley Kubrick's Lolita (1962).

Winters returned to Broadway on The Night of the Iguana (1962), playing Bette Davis' role. She performed Off Broadway in Cages by Lewis John Carlino in 1963. Many of her roles now had a sexual component: in The Chapman Report (1962) she played an unfaithful housewife and she played madams in The Balcony (1963) and A House Is Not a Home (1964). She appeared in Wives and Lovers (1963) and episodes of shows such as Alcoa Theatre, Ben Casey, and Thirty-Minute Theatre. Winters was featured in the Italian film Time of Indifference (1964) with Rod Steiger and Claudia Cardinale, and had one of the many cameos in the religious epic The Greatest Story Ever Told (1965), again for George Stevens.

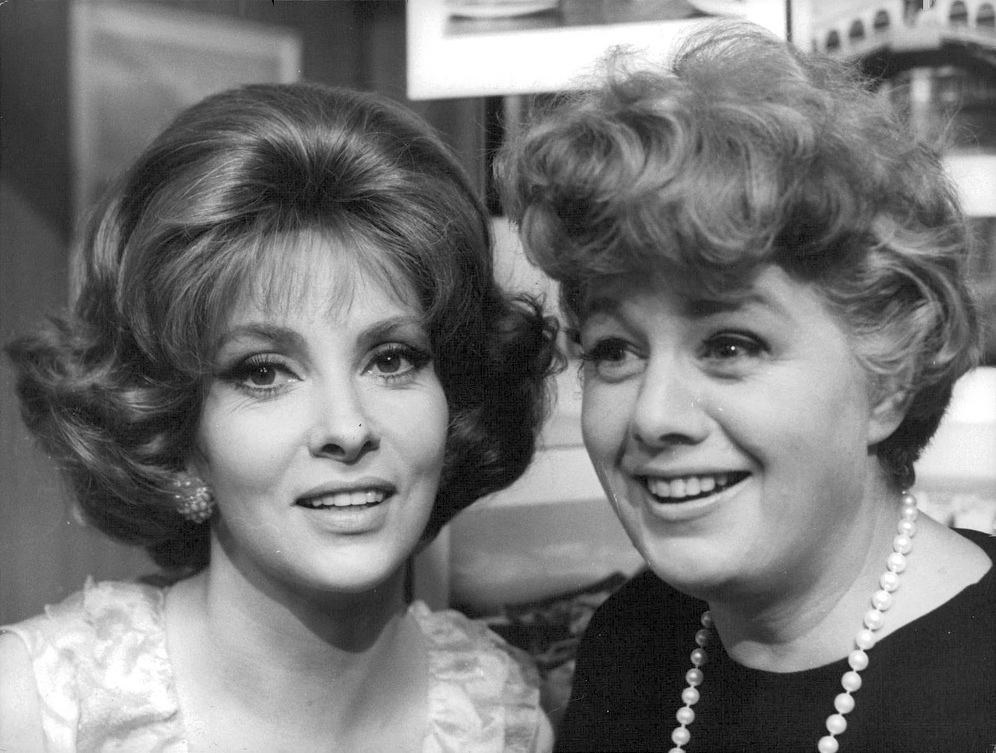
Winters with Gina Lollobrigida at the set of Buona Sera, Mrs. Campbell (1968) in Rome

Winters won her second Best Supporting Actress Oscar in A Patch of Blue (1965) for her performance as Rose-Ann D'Arcey, the cruel and vulgar mother of an illiterate blind girl. She had supporting roles opposite Michael Caine in Alfie (1966) and as the fading, alcoholic former starlet Fay Estabrook in Harper (1966). She returned to Broadway in Under the Weather (1966) by Saul Bellow which ran for 12 performances. Winters played "Ma Parker" the villain in Batman. She was in a TV version of The Three Sisters (1966) and had roles in Enter Laughing (1967) for Carl Reiner, Armchair Theatre, Bob Hope Presents the Chrysler Theatre (several episodes), The Scalphunters (1968) for Sydney Pollack, Wild in the Streets (1968), Buona Sera, Mrs. Campbell (1968), Arthur? Arthur! (1969), and The Mad Room (1969).

=== 1970–1999: Later roles ===
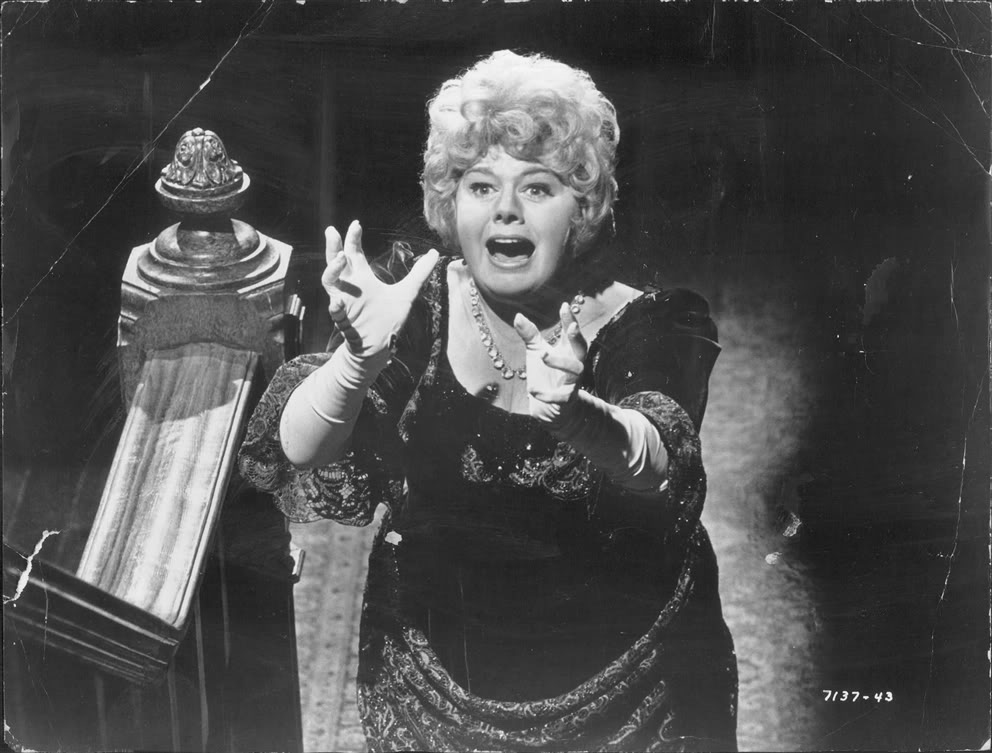
Winters as the title character in Whoever Slew Auntie Roo? (1971)

Winters played Ma Barker in Bloody Mama (1970) a big hit for Roger Corman. She had roles in How Do I Love Thee? (1970) and Flap (1970) for Carol Reed. She returned to the stage to play Minnie Marx, mother of the Marx Brothers in the Broadway musical Minnie's Boys (1970), which ran for 80 performances. Winters wrote an evening of three one-act plays titled One Night Stands of a Noisy Passenger (1970–1971), which ran for seven performances; the cast included Robert De Niro and Diane Ladd. Winters had the lead in two horror films, Whoever Slew Auntie Roo? (1971), and What's the Matter with Helen? (1971), and two TV movies, Revenge! (1971), and A Death of Innocence (1971). She had supporting roles in Adventures of Nick Carter (1972) and had a co-starring role in Something to Hide (1972) with Peter Finch. She starred in The Vamp for ITV Sunday Night Theatre. In The Poseidon Adventure (1972), she was Belle Rosen, a Jewish grandmother who selflessly attempts to lead her fellow passengers to escape the confines of the doomed ocean liner. For this film she received her final Oscar nomination.

Winters was top-billed in The Devil's Daughter (1973) for TV. She had a supporting role in Blume in Love (1973) for Paul Mazursky and Cleopatra Jones (1973) and leading parts in Big Rose: Double Trouble (1974) and The Sex Symbol (1974). Winters guest-starred on McCloud and Chico and the Man and was seen in Poor Pretty Eddie (1975), That Lucky Touch (1975), Journey into Fear (1975), Diamonds (1975), Next Stop, Greenwich Village (1976) for Paul Mazursky, The Tenant (1976) for Roman Polanski, Mimì Bluette... fiore del mio giardino (1977) with Monica Vitti, Tentacles (1977), An Average Little Man (1977) with Alberto Sordi, Pete's Dragon (1977), The Initiation of Sarah (1978), and King of the Gypsies (1978). She starred in a 1978 Broadway production of Paul Zindel's The Effect of Gamma Rays on Man-in-the-Moon Marigolds, which only had a short run. Winters starred in the Italian horror film Gran bollito (1977) and played Gladys Presley in Elvis (1979) for TV. She was in The Visitor (1979), City on Fire (1979), The Magician of Lublin (1979) for Menahem Golan, The French Atlantic Affair (1979) and an episode of the ABC series Vega$, with Vega$ star Robert Urich.

Winters' 1980s performances included Looping (1981), S.O.B., episodes of The Love Boat, Sex, Lies and Renaissance (1983), Over the Brooklyn Bridge (1984), Ellie (1984), Déjà Vu (1985), Alice in Wonderland (1985), and The Delta Force (1986). She did The Gingerbread Lady on stage. She had a starring role in Witchfire (1986) and was credited as executive producer. She was in Very Close Quarters (1986), Purple People Eater (1988), and An Unremarkable Life (1989).

In a 1989 interview at NPR, Winters recounts Gloria Steinem's comment about part of her work in film. Steinem noted that films like "Double Life," "A Place In the Sun," and "Night of the Hunter" were all about women who were victims. Steinem thought that these films were laying the groundwork for the women's lib movement. Winters explained that these women she portrayed were fighting against these situations.

Her final performances included Touch of a Stranger (1990), Stepping Out (1991) with Liza Minnelli, Weep No More, My Lady (1992), The Pickle (1993) for Mazursky, and The Silence of the Hams (1994). Later audiences knew her primarily for her autobiographies and for her television work, in which she usually played a humorous parody of her public persona. In a recurring role in the 1990s, Winters played the title character's grandmother on the sitcom Roseanne. Her final film roles were supporting ones: She played a restaurant owner and mother of an overweight cook in Heavy (1995) with Liv Tyler and Debbie Harry for James Mangold; an aristocrat in The Portrait of a Lady (1996), starring Nicole Kidman and John Malkovich; and an embittered nursing home administrator in 1999's Gideon. She was in comedies such as Backfire! (1995), Jury Duty (1995), and Mrs. Munck (1995) as well as Raging Angels (1995). Winters made an appearance at the 1998 Academy Awards telecast, which featured a tribute to Oscar winners past and present.

The Associated Press reported: "During her 50 years as a widely known personality, Winters was rarely out of the news. Her stormy marriages, her romances with famous stars, her forays into politics and feminist causes kept her name before the public. She delighted in giving provocative interviews and seemed to have an opinion on everything." That led to a second career as a writer. Winters became a best-selling author with her memoirs, Shelley, Also Known as Shirley (1980), Shelley II: The Middle of My Century (1989) and Shelley Winters: Best of Times, Worst of Times(1990). In these books she chronicled her life and career, as well as intimate relationships with such Hollywood legends as Errol Flynn, Burt Lancaster, William Holden and Sean Connery. Though not a conventional beauty, she claimed that her acting, wit, and chutzpah gave her a sex life to rival Monroe's. Her claimed partners also included William Holden and Marlon Brando.

== Honors ==
For her contributions to motion pictures, Winters has a star on the Hollywood Walk of Fame, at 1752 Vine Street.

She received the Lifetime Achievement Award at the 1998 Hollywood Film Festival, commenting "this award is bigger than the Oscars! It's about time Hollywood started to pay less attention to … violence, and more attention to human beings and relationships."

- 1948 and 1951 Photoplay Award: Best Performances of the Month (November/September): winner
- 1954 Special Jury Prize: winner
- Golden Laurel: Top Female Supporting Performance (1960) "The Diary of Anne Frank" winner; Best Supporting Performance, Female, in for "A Patch of Blue" (1966) winner
- Kansas City Film Critics Circle Award (1967) Best Supporting Actress i "A Patch of Blue" winner
- 1977 Special David award: winner

== Personal life ==
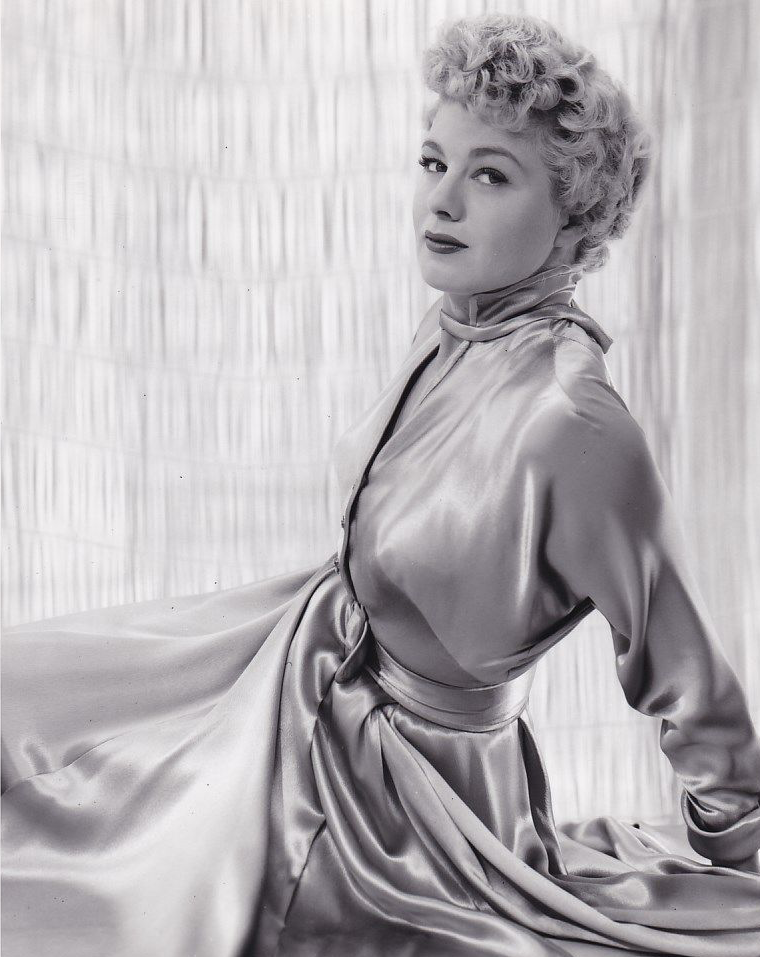
Winters in publicity photo, c. 1950

Winters was married four times. Her husbands were:

- Captain Mack Paul Mayer, whom she married on December 29, 1943, in Brooklyn. Winters and Mayer were divorced in October 1948. Mayer was unable to deal with Shelley's "Hollywood lifestyle" and wanted a "traditional homemaker" for a wife. Mayer wore his wedding ring up until her death and kept their relationship very private. There is some debate as to who kept wearing their wedding ring until the other's death because Mayer died in 1990. At least 2 external sources claim it was Shelley who continued to wear the ring.
- Vittorio Gassman, whom she married on April 28, 1952, in Juárez, Mexico; they divorced on June 2, 1954. They had one child: Vittoria, born February 14, 1953, a physician in Connecticut. She is Winters' only child.
- Anthony Franciosa, whom she married on May 4, 1957; they were divorced on November 18, 1960. He died five days after Winters, having had a stroke the day she died.
- Gerry DeFord, whom she married on January 13, 2006.

Hours before her death, Winters married long-time companion Gerry DeFord, with whom she had lived for 19 years. Though Winters' daughter objected to the marriage, actress Sally Kirkland performed the wedding ceremony while Winters was on her deathbed, declaring that Deford was the love of Shelley's life. Kirkland, a minister of the Movement of Spiritual Inner Awareness, also performed Winters's non-denominational last rites.

Winters had a much-publicized romance with Farley Granger that became a long-term friendship (according to their respective autobiographies). She starred with him in the 1951 film Behave Yourself! as well as in a 1957 television production of A. J. Cronin's novel Beyond This Place.

She was a great supporter of her friends in Hollywood. She participated in a 1983 exercise video created by Debbie Reynolds. Reynolds called it a workout for ladies: older women who might appreciate occasional low-impact leg lifts. To make sure she was noticed, Winters wore sweat pants with a sweatshirt that read "I'm Only Doing This for Debbie," then spent her time making jokes from the back row while she half heartedly participated in the routine. The filming took place in a studio decked out in bubble-gum-pink carpeting and a crystal chandelier, Debbie's name written in giant lights, the set looking like a Barbie Dreamhouse. Reynolds, fifty-one at the time, dressed in a burgundy leotard, matching tights, and a matching choker around her neck ready to show off her routine called "Do It Debbie's Way."

Being a Democrat, Winters attended the 1960 Democratic National Convention. In 1965, she addressed the Selma Marchers briefly outside Montgomery, Alabama, on the night before they marched into the state capitol. Winters endorsed Robert F. Kennedy's presidential campaign in 1968 and Michael Dukakis's presidential campaign in 1988.

Winters became friendly with rock singer Janis Joplin shortly before Joplin died in 1970. She invited Joplin to sit in on a class session at the Actors' Studio at its Los Angeles location. Joplin never did.

Critic Kevin Thomas described Winters' character as "a mass of contradictions as only a Method actress can be. She was mercurial, adorable, infuriating, loyal, brave."

== Death ==
Winters died at the age of 85 on January 14, 2006, of heart failure at the Rehabilitation Center of Beverly Hills; she had suffered a heart attack on October 14, 2005. She is interred at Hillside Memorial Park Cemetery in Culver City, California.

== Filmography ==
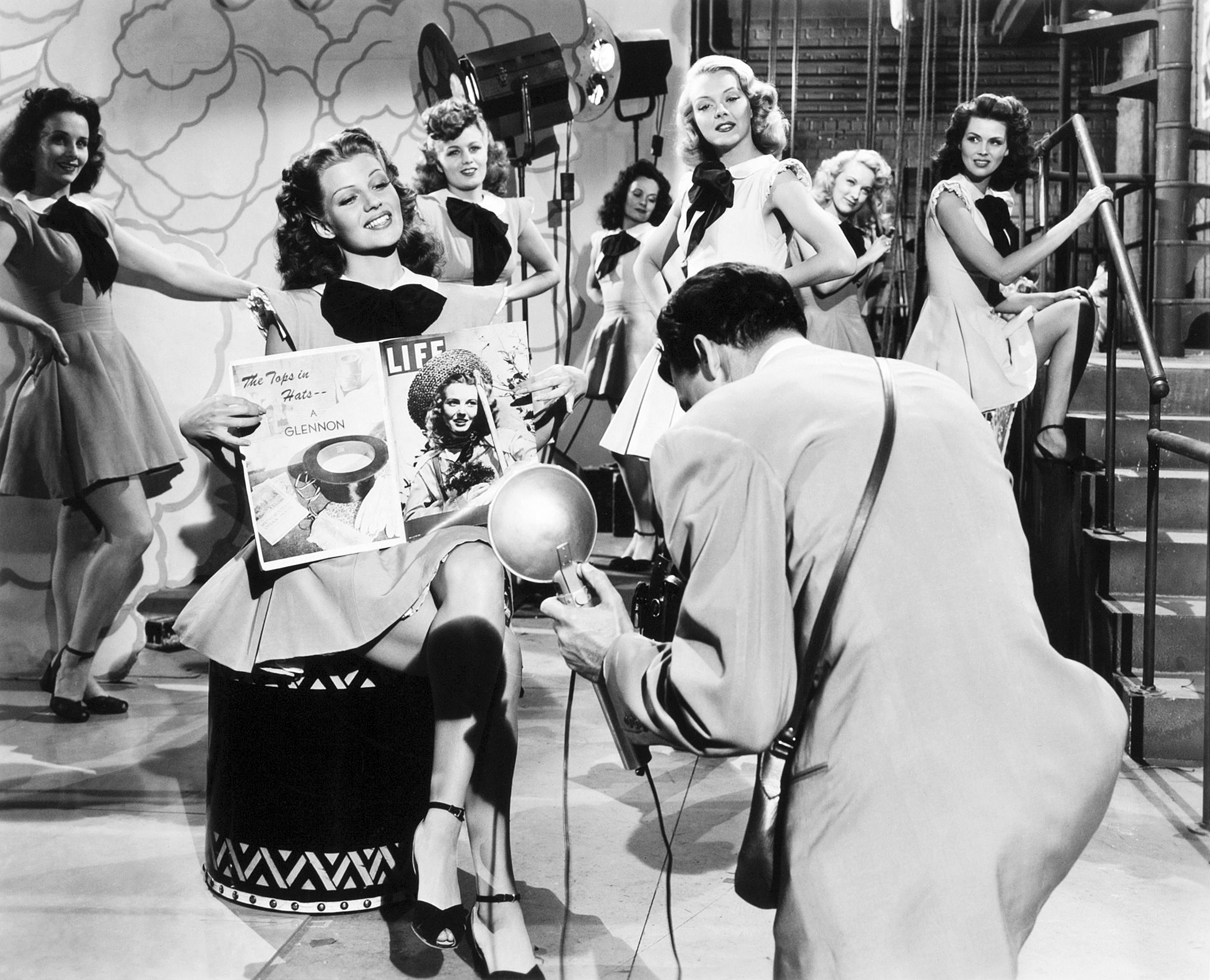
Uncredited in Tonight and Every Night (1945), Winters is behind Rita Hayworth.

=== Film ===
Year	Film	Role	Notes
1943	There's Something About a Soldier	Norma	Uncredited
1943	What a Woman!	Secretary	Uncredited
1944	Sailor's Holiday	Gloria Flynn	Credited as 'Shelley Winter'
1944	Knickerbocker Holiday	Ulda Tienhoven	Credited as 'Shelley Winter'
1944	Cover Girl	Chorus Girl	Uncredited
1944	She's a Soldier Too	'Silver' Rankin	Uncredited
1944	Dancing in Manhattan	Margie	Uncredited
1944	Together Again	Young Woman Fleeing Nightclub Raid	Uncredited
1945	Tonight and Every Night	Bubbles	Uncredited
1945	Escape in the Fog	Taxi Driver	Uncredited
1945	A Thousand and One Nights	Handmaiden	Uncredited
1946	The Fighting Guardsman	Nanette	Uncredited
1946	Two Smart People	Princess	Uncredited
1946	Susie Steps Out	Female Singer	
1946	Abie's Irish Rose	Bridesmaid	Uncredited
1947	New Orleans	Ms. Holmbright	Uncredited
1947	Living in a Big Way	Junior League Girl	Uncredited
1947	The Gangster	Hazel – Cashier	Uncredited
1947	Killer McCoy	Waitress / Autograph Hound	Uncredited
1947	A Double Life	Pat Kroll	
1948	Red River	Dance Hall Girl in Wagon Train	Uncredited
1948	Larceny	Tory	
1948	Cry of the City	Brenda Martingale	
1949	Take One False Step	Catherine Sykes	
1949	The Great Gatsby	Myrtle Wilson	
1949	Johnny Stool Pigeon	Terry Stewart	
1950	Winchester '73	Lola Manners	
1950	South Sea Sinner	Coral	
1950	Frenchie	Frenchie Fontaine	
1951	A Place in the Sun	Alice Tripp	
1951	He Ran All the Way	Peggy Dobbs	
1951	Behave Yourself!	Kate Denny	
1951	The Raging Tide	Connie Thatcher	
1952	Phone Call from a Stranger	Binky Gay	
1952	Meet Danny Wilson	Joy Carroll	
1952	Untamed Frontier	Jane Stevens	
1952	My Man and I	Nancy	
1954	Tennessee Champ	Sarah Wurble	
1954	Saskatchewan	Grace Markey	
1954	Executive Suite	Eva Bardeman	
1954	Playgirl	Fran Davis	
1954	Mambo	Toni Salermo	
1954	To Dorothy a Son	Myrtle La Mar	
1955	I Am a Camera	Natalia Landauer	
1955	The Night of the Hunter	Willa Harper	
1955	The Big Knife	Dixie Evans	Credited as 'Miss Shelley Winters'
1955	The Treasure of Pancho Villa	Ruth Harris	
1955	I Died a Thousand Times	Marie Garson	
1959	The Diary of Anne Frank	Petronella van Daan	
1959	Odds Against Tomorrow	Lorry	
1960	Let No Man Write My Epitaph	Nellie Romano	
1961	The Young Savages	Mary diPace	
1962	Lolita	Charlotte Haze	
1962	The Chapman Report	Sarah Garnell	
1963	The Balcony	Madame Irma	
1963	Wives and Lovers	Fran Cabrell	
1964	A House Is Not a Home	Polly Adler	
1964	Time of Indifference	Lisa	
1965	The Greatest Story Ever Told	Healed Woman	
1965	A Patch of Blue	Rose-Ann D'Arcey	
1966	Harper	Fay Estabrook	
1966	Alfie	Ruby	
1966	The Three Sisters	Natalya	
1967	Enter Laughing	Emma Kolowitz	
1968	The Scalphunters	Kate	
1968	Wild in the Streets	Daphne Flatow	
1968	Buona Sera, Mrs. Campbell	Shirley Newman	
1969	The Mad Room	Mrs. Armstrong	
1969	Arthur? Arthur!	Hester Green	
1970	Bloody Mama	"Ma" Kate Barker	
1970	How Do I Love Thee?	Lena Marvin	
1970	Flap	Dorothy Bluebell	
1971	What's the Matter with Helen?	Helen	
1972	Something to Hide	Gabriella	
1972	Whoever Slew Auntie Roo?	Mrs. Forrest	
1972	The Poseidon Adventure	Belle Rosen	
1973	Blume in Love	Mrs. Cramer	
1973	Cleopatra Jones	Mommy	
1973	The Stone Killer	Drunk Woman in Police Station	Uncredited cameo
1975	Poor Pretty Eddie	Bertha	
1975	That Lucky Touch	Diana Steedeman	
1975	Journey into Fear	Mrs. Mathews	
1975	Diamonds	Zelda Shapiro	
1976	The Tenant	The Concierge	
1976	Next Stop, Greenwich Village	Faye Lapinsky	
1976	Mimì Bluette... fiore del mio giardino	Caterina	
1977	Tentacles	Tillie Turner	
1977	An Average Little Man	Amalia Vivaldi	
1977	Pete's Dragon	Lena Gogan	
1977	Black Journal	Lea	
1978	King of the Gypsies	Queen Rachel	
1979	The French Atlantic Affair	Helen Wabash	
1979	The Visitor	Jane Phillips	
1979	City on Fire	Nurse Andrea Harper	
1979	The Magician of Lublin	Elzbieta	
1981	S.O.B.	Eva Brown	
1981	Looping	Carmen	
1983	Fanny Hill	Mrs. Cole	
1984	Over the Brooklyn Bridge	Becky	
1984	Ellie	Cora Jackson	
1985	Déjà Vu	Olga Nabokova	
1986	The Delta Force	Edie Kaplan	
1986	Witchfire	Lydia	
1986	Very Close Quarters	Galina	
1988	Purple People Eater	Rita	
1989	An Unremarkable Life	Evelyn McEllany	
1990	Touch of a Stranger	Ida	
1991	Stepping Out	Mrs. Fraser	
1992	Weep No More, My Lady	Vivian Morgan	
1993	The Pickle	Yetta	
1994	The Silence of the Hams	Mrs. Motel	
1995	Heavy	Dolly Modino	
1995	Backfire!	The Good Lieutenant	
1995	Jury Duty	Mom	
1995	Mrs. Munck	Aunt Monica	
1995	Raging Angels	Grandma Ruth	
1996	The Portrait of a Lady	Mrs. Touchett	
1998	Gideon	Mrs. Willows	
1999	La bomba	Prof. Summers	
2006	A-List	Herself	

=== Television ===
Year	Title	Role	Notes
1954	The Ford Television Theatre	Sally Marland	Episode: "Mantrap"
1955	Producers' Showcase	Crystal Allen	Episode: "The Woman"
1955–66	What's My Line	Herself (guest)	5 episodes
1957	The Alcoa Hour	Pat Kroll	Episode: "A Double Life"
1957	The United States Steel Hour	Evvie	Episode: "Inspired Alibi"
1957	Wagon Train	Ruth Owens	Episode: "The Ruth Owens Story"
1957	Schlitz Playhouse of Stars	Mildred Corrigan	Episode: "Smarty"
1957	DuPont Show of the Month	Louisa Burt	Episode: "Beyond This Place"
1960	Play of the Week	Rose	Episode: "A Piece of Blue Sky"
1962	Alcoa Premiere	Meg Fletcher, Millie Norman	2 episodes
1964	Ben Casey	Lydia Mitchum	Episode: "A Disease of the Heart Called Love"
1964–67	Bob Hope Presents the Chrysler Theatre	Jenny Dworak, Edith, Clarry Golden	3 episodes
1965	Thirty-Minute Theatre	Mrs. Bixby	Episode: "Mrs. Bixby and the Colonel's Coat"
1966	Batman	Ma Parker	2 episodes
1968	Here's Lucy	Shelley Summers	Episode: "Lucy and Miss Shelley Winters"
1974	McCloud	Thelma	Episode: "The Barefoot Girls of Bleecker Street"
1975	Chico and the Man	Shirley Schrift	Episode: "Ed Steps Out"
1978	Kojak	Evelyn McNeil	Episode: "The Captain's Brother's Wife"
1979	Vega$	J.D. Fenton	Episode: "Macho Murders"
1982	The Love Boat	Teresa Rosselli	Season 6, episode 1
1984	Hotel	Adele Ellsworth	Episode: "Trials"
1984	Hawaiian Heat	Florence Senkowski	Episode: "Andy's Mom"
1991–96	Roseanne	Nana Mary	10 episodes

==== TV films, miniseries, and specials ====
Year	Title	Role
1971	Revenge!	Amanda Hilton
1971	A Death of Innocence	Elizabeth Cameron
1972	Adventures of Nick Carter	Bess Tucker
1973	The Devil's Daughter	Lilith Malone
1974	Big Rose: Double Trouble	Rose Winters
1974	The Sex Symbol	Agathy Murphy
1976	Frosty's Winter Wonderland	Crystal (voice)
1978	The Initiation of Sarah	Mrs. Erica Hunter
1979	Rudolph and Frosty's Christmas in July	Crystal (voice)
1979	Elvis	Gladys Presley
1983	Parade of Stars	Sophie Tucker
1985	Alice in Wonderland	The Dodo Bird
1987	The Sleeping Beauty	Fairy

== Stage credits ==
Year	Title	Role	Venue	Notes	Ref.
1941	The Night Before Christmas	Flora	Morosco Theatre, New York		
1942	Rosalinda	Fifi	46th Street Theatre, New York		
1943–48	Oklahoma!	Ado Annie	St. James Theatre, New York	Replacement	
1955–56	A Hatful of Rain	Celia Pope	Lyceum Theatre, New York		
1955–56	A Hatful of Rain	Celia Pope	Plymouth Theatre, New York		
1956	Girls of Summer	Hilda Brookman	Longacre Theatre, New York		
1962	The Night of the Iguana	Maxine Faulk	Royale Theatre, New York	Replacement	
1966	Under the Weather	Marcella, Hilda, Flora	Cort Theatre, New York		
1970	Minnie's Boys	Minnie Marx	Imperial Theatre, New York		
1973	The Effect of Gamma Rays on Man-in-the-Moon Marigolds	Beatrice	Smith Memorial Playground & Playhouse, Philadelphia		
1978	The Effect of Gamma Rays on Man-in-the-Moon Marigolds	Beatrice	Biltmore Theatre, New York		

Summer Stock plays

- The Taming of the Shrew (1947)
- Born Yesterday (1950)
- Wedding Breakfast (1955)
- A Piece of Blue Sky (1959)
- Two for the Seasaw (1960)
- The Country Girl (1961)
- A View from the Bridge (1961)
- Days of the Dancing (1964)
- Who's Afraid of Virginia Woolf? (1965)
- 84 Charing Cross Road (1983)

== Radio credits ==
Year	Program	Episode	Ref.
1953	Lux Radio Theatre	Phone Call from a Stranger	

== Awards and nominations ==
=== Academy Awards ===
Year	Category	Title	Result	Ref(s)
1951	Best Actress	A Place in the Sun	Nominated	
1959	Best Supporting Actress	The Diary of Anne Frank	Won	
1965	Best Supporting Actress	A Patch of Blue	Won	
1972	Best Supporting Actress	The Poseidon Adventure	Nominated	

=== British Academy Film Awards ===
Year	Category	Title	Result	Ref(s)
1972	Best Supporting Actress	The Poseidon Adventure	Nominated	
1977	Best Supporting Actress	Next Stop, Greenwich Village	Nominated	

=== Golden Globe Awards ===
Year	Category	Title	Result	Ref(s)
1951	Best Actress – Drama Film	A Place in the Sun	Nominated	
1959	Best Supporting Actress	The Diary of Anne Frank	Nominated	
1962	Best Actress – Drama Film	Lolita	Nominated	
1966	Best Supporting Actress	Alfie	Nominated	
1972	Best Supporting Actress	The Poseidon Adventure	Won	
1976	Best Supporting Actress	Next Stop, Greenwich Village	Nominated	

=== Primetime Emmy Awards ===
Year	Category	Title	Result	Ref(s)
1964	Outstanding Lead Actress	Bob Hope Presents the Chrysler Theatre	Won	
1966	Outstanding Lead Actress	Bob Hope Presents the Chrysler Theatre	Nominated	
1974	Supporting Actress – Comedy/Drama Series	McCloud NBC Sunday Mystery Movie	Nominated	

== Bibliography ==
- Winters, Shelley (1980). Shelley: Also known as Shirley. Morrow. ISBN 978-0-688-03638-6.
- Winters, Shelley (1989). Shelley II: The Middle of My Century. Simon & Schuster. ISBN 978-0-671-44210-1.
- Shelley: The Middle of My Century (audiobook; audio cassette)
