= Jacqueline Bouvier Kennedy (film) =

- Genre: Biography, Drama
- Written by: Steve Gethers
- Directed by: Steve Gethers
- Starring: Jaclyn Smith (VF Evelyne Selena); James Franciscus (VF: Bernard Murat); Rod Taylor (VF: Roland Menard)
- Music by: Billy Goldenberg
- Country of origin: United States
- Original language: English

Production
- Producer: Louis Rudolph
- Production locations: King County, Washington; Universal Studios; Universal City, California; Boeing Field; Seattle, Washington; University of Washington; Seattle, Washington
- Cinematography: Isidore Mankofsky
- Editors: Edward A. Biery; Paul LaMastra; John Nielson; Kent State
- Running time: 150 minutes
- Production company: ABC Circle Films

Original release
- Network: ABC
- Release: October 14, 1981

Jacqueline Bouvier Kennedy is a 1981 American made-for-television biographical drama film starring Jaclyn Smith as Jacqueline Bouvier Kennedy, James Franciscus as John F. Kennedy and Rod Taylor as "Black Jack" Bouvier. Smith was nominated for a Golden Globe for her portrayal.
