= Robert L. Collins =

American director and screenwriter (1930–2011)

- Born: Robert Lee Collins; June 1, 1930; United States
- Died: October 21, 2011 (aged 81); Van Nuys, California, U.S.
- Occupations: Director, screenwriter
- Spouse: Dorothy Mark
- Children: 2

Robert Lee Collins (June 1, 1930 – October 21, 2011) was an American television director and screenwriter who created the American police procedural television series Police Woman, which starred Angie Dickinson.

Collins was scheduled to direct the pilot episode of the television series Star Trek: Phase II, but was replaced by Robert Wise when it was decided that the project would be a feature film instead. His other credits includes, Police Story, Marcus Welby, M.D., The Bold Ones: The New Doctors, Cannon and The Name of the Game. In 1975, Collins was nominated for an Primetime Emmy for Outstanding Writing in a Drama Series for his work on Police Story. He died in October 2011 of cardiopulmonary arrest in Van Nuys, California, at the age of 81.
