= Fernando Muylaert =

Brazilian comedian, journalist and television personality

- Born: São Paulo, SP
- Website: Fernano Muyalaert

Fernando Muylaert (July 6, 1976-), is a Brazilian comedian, journalist and television personality.

== Biography ==
Fernando Muylaert was born in São Paulo, Brazil. He began his career at age seven, after winning a camera from his father. At age 16 he joined the school drama club. He worked in radio and TV FAAP and Actors Theatre and Groundlings. He worked on various video productions as editor, camera and production.

Muylaert was a cast member of the Brazilian version of Saturday Night Live.

In 1998 he debuted at SBT, doing reports for cultural program Pascowich Joyce. While in Australia, he collaborated with H. Luciano Huck on a program led by the Band (Brazilian channel). He worked with Otavio Mesquita in RedeTV (Brazilian channel) producing and presenting the framework INSANE. For two years he presented the Muyloco TV show, which was webcast live. In 2004 he signed with Multishow (Brazilian channel from Globosat), where he led the Vida Loca TV show for 3 seasons, mixing entertainment and information.

In 2010 his stand up comedy show debuted in the United States at Gotham Comedy Club. In 2011 and 2012 he performed at LA Improv and The Comedy Store.

In 2013 hosted "SEM DIREÇÃO" "Without Direction" A crazy Talk Show in a BUS that run in Sao PAulo for MULTISHOW

Teach Comedy Sketch in O_Barco Art School.

=== Television career ===
- Sem Direção (TV Show) – Host Multishow
- Saturday Night Live – Rede TV
- Eliana (TV Show) – Reporter SBT
- Vida Loca Show (TV Show) – Host Multishow
- Muyloco (TV Show) – Host AllTV
- Insano (TV Show) – Funny Reporter Rede TV
- Programa H – with Luciano Huck (TV Show) – Reporter Band
- Programa São Paulo Brasil (TV Show) – Reporter TV Cultura e GNT
- Programa Joyce Pascowitch (TV Show) – Video Reporter SBT

=== Theater ===
- Boca de Ouro
- A Ópera de três vintens
- Medéia
