= LOL with The N =

- Genre: Stand-up comedy
- Directed by: Adam Idleson
- Presented by: Mike Birbiglia
- Country of origin: United States
- Original language: English
- No. of seasons: 1
- No. of episodes: 4

Production
- Production locations: Gotham Comedy Club, New York
- Running time: 21 minutes
- Production company: The N Original Productions

Original release
- Network: The N (Noggin)
- Release: May 30 – June 20, 2003

LOL with The N is a series of four stand-up comedy specials that aired on Noggin's teen programming block, The N. The miniseries aired from May 30, 2003 to June 20, 2003. Stand-up comedian Mike Birbiglia was the host of all four segments. Each special features two aspiring teen comedians who get the chance to perform alongside professional stand-up comics. Behind-the-scenes footage, showing all of the comedians preparing their routines, is played after the acts.

The specials compared professional and first-time comics to illustrate how talents can grow over time. Kenny Miller, the vice president of Noggin, explained that "at the beginning of your career and after 10 years, you're at a different stage, and we wanted to represent all of that." The production team aimed to make the specials relatable to all teenage viewers, not just those pursuing a career in comedy. The director, Adam Idleson, commented that "there is sort of a psychic link between being a teenager and being a stand-up comic. It feels like you're out there on the stage alone against the world, and you're dealing with it with humor."

== History ==
Production on the series began in January 2003, with filming taking place at the Gotham Comedy Club in New York City. The new performers were recruited from a training program in Manhattan called Kids 'N Comedy. Visitors were allowed to attend the taping sessions, which started on January 5. The series premiered in May 2003 as part of a programming event called "Summer in The N." Each special was shown on a Friday at 7:00 PM.

== Episodes ==
No.	Title	Original release date
1	"Special 1"	May 30, 2003
The first special featured performances from Frankie Marsico, a 16-year-old from Rutherford, and Ed Ubell, a 15-year-old New Yorker.
2	"Special 2"	June 6, 2003
3	"Special 3"	June 13, 2003
4	"Special 4"	June 20, 2003
