= The Wedding Ringer =

2015 film by Jeremy Garelick

- Theatrical release poster
- Directed by: Jeremy Garelick
- Written by: Jeremy Garelick; Jay Lavender
- Produced by: Adam Fields; Will Packer
- Starring: Kevin Hart; Josh Gad; Kaley Cuoco; Ken Howard; Cloris Leachman; Jenifer Lewis; Mimi Rogers; Olivia Thirlby
- Cinematography: Bradford Lipson
- Edited by: Jeff Groth; Shelly Westerman; Byron Wong
- Music by: Christopher Lennertz
- Production companies: Screen Gems; Miramax; LStar Capital; Adam Fields Productions; Will Packer Productions
- Distributed by: Sony Pictures Releasing
- Release date: January 16, 2015
- Running time: 101 minutes
- Country: United States
- Language: English
- Budget: $23 million
- Box office: $79.8 million

The Wedding Ringer is a 2015 American buddy romantic comedy film directed and co-written by Jeremy Garelick in his directorial debut. It stars Kevin Hart, Josh Gad, and Kaley Cuoco-Sweeting. The film was produced by Adam Fields, Will Packer Productions and Miramax, distributed by Screen Gems, and released on January 16, 2015.

Despite receiving generally negative reviews, the film was a box office success, grossing over $79 million against a $23 million budget.

== Plot ==
Jimmy Callahan provides best man services, through The Best Man Inc., for men who do not have the friends needed for a wedding. Successful tax attorney Doug Harris and his fiancée Gretchen Palmer are planning their wedding. Needing a best man and groomsmen, Doug contacts Jimmy's company.

Doug needs a "Golden Tux" (seven groomsmen) to match with Gretchen's bridesmaids, which has never been done before. Jimmy agrees to do it for $50,000, all expenses paid.

Three of Jimmy's friends are recruited as groomsmen: Fitzgibbons, a federal prison escapee, Lurch, who has a nagging wife and Reggie, an airport security guard. They interview for the four remaining spots: they choose Kip, who has a stutter; Endo, who has three testicles; Bronstein, who can dislocate and relocate his shoulder; and Otis, who can say sentences backwards.

Doug tells Gretchen that "Bic" is a military priest based in El Salvador, and she insists that he also come to the family brunch. There, Doug gets nervous, almost blowing his cover until Jimmy accidentally sets Gretchen's grandmother on fire. In the emergency room, Jimmy lies to Gretchen's father Ed, that they used to play football. So he challenges them to a match with some of his old college teammates.

Doug meets his groomsmen, all with fake identities based on the last names of famous Los Angeles sports figures. Jimmy takes Doug and the groomsmen on fake photo shoots of skydiving, scuba-diving, etc..

When Doug begins to have doubts, they visit Edmundo, who says the key is to please Gretchen and her mother Lois and nothing else. To prove how good he is at being a best man, Jimmy takes Doug to a wedding where the best man makes a terrible speech. They later have drinks and show off their dance moves. Jimmy reveals how he gave an excellent best man speech for an acquaintance which led to his career as a wedding ringer. Doug explains that he moved a lot with his parents, so he never got to make friends. When his parents died, Doug took over the business, and work consumed him, leaving him without friends. Jimmy drives Doug home, and reiterates that they are in a business relationship, and Doug, although hurt, agrees.

At Doug's bachelor party, he is introduced to Nadia, who tries to seduce him. Doug instead befriends her. A prank involving peanut butter, a dog and a blindfolded Doug goes awry, requiring the groomsmen and Nadia to rush him to a hospital. When he wakes up the next day, Nadia kisses him goodbye, hinting she would like to know him better. Later, the groomsmen play football with Ed and his college football friends, including famous professional players. A mud bowl ensues, Ed blows out his knee on the last play and the wedding party team wins.

At the rehearsal dinner, Gretchen's bridesmaids sing, while Doug's groomsmen create a slideshow of fake pictures they took, winning Gretchen over. That night, she notices the Bic razors and Mitchum deodorant in the cabinet, and recognizes the last names of the groomsmen, deducing the scheme. Asking Doug about it, he brushes it off, saying she is paranoid.

On the wedding day, the family priest cancels, so Doug suggests that Jimmy officiate. At the reception, Jimmy congratulates Gretchen, who exclaims that the wedding is a disaster as her zipper is torn, her grandmother has third degree burns, her dad's knee is blown out, the food is bad, and she does not love Doug (saying she only married him because he is nice and can afford her lavish lifestyle). Doug overhears and starts thinking that he cannot go through with it, but Jimmy dismisses this.

As Jimmy gives his best man speech, Doug stops him, revealing they are not married as "Bic" is not a real priest, nor are his groomsmen who they claim to be. Gretchen is livid that her wedding is ruined. Jimmy gets a date with Gretchen's sister, Allison. While leaving, Doug pays Jimmy his $50,000 fee, and they accept each other's friendship. Jimmy then has the idea to cash in Doug's first class honeymoon tickets to Tahiti, going instead on a guys trip, along with Nadia (who is now Doug's girlfriend).

== Cast ==
- Kevin Hart as Bic Mitchum/Jimmy Callahan
- Josh Gad as Doug Harris
- Kaley Cuoco as Gretchen Palmer
- Alan Ritchson as Kip Loyola/Carew
- Cloris Leachman as Grandma Palmer
- Mimi Rogers as Lois Palmer
- Ken Howard as Ed Palmer
- Affion Crockett as Reggie/Drysdale
- Jenifer Lewis as Doris Jenkins
- Olivia Thirlby as Allison Palmer
- Justine Ezarik as Pam Reinsdorf
- Jorge Garcia as Lurch/Garvey
- Josh Peck as Bad Best Man
- Eugenio Cobo as Roberto
- Aaron Hernan as Francisco
- Joe Namath as himself
- John Riggins as himself
- Ed "Too Tall" Jones as himself
- Francisco Gattorno as David
- Michelle Vieth as Martha
- Fernando Colunga as Jose
- Aaron Takahashi as Harvey Endo/Rambis
- Dan Gill as Gil Bronstein/Dickerson
- Corey Holcomb as Otis/Alzado
- Glozell Green as Attractive Traveler
- Tristin Mays as Cute Bridesmaid
- Colin Kane as Fitzgibbons/Plunkett
- Ignacio Serricchio as Edmundo Regal/Dirty Eddie Sanchez
- Nicole Whelan as Nadia
- Whitney Cummings as Holly Munk
- Jeff Ross as a Wedding Singer
- Nikki Leigh as The 15-Year-Old
- Lisa Donovan as The Flight Attendant
- Lindsay Pearce as Alexandra Plylow

== Production ==
=== Development ===
The film evolved from a spec script titled "The Golden Tux" that was purchased by Dimension Films as early as 2002, at that time Todd Phillips, director of The Hangover was attached as a producer. The film went through many revisions as many actors came and left the project. By 2013, Screen Gems and Miramax had agreed to produce the film, which by then had both Kevin Hart and Josh Gad attached and the name had officially changed to The Wedding Ringer and production had begun.

The film was officially given a date of February 6, 2015. However this was later moved to January 16 after Universal Pictures' Ride Along, another Kevin Hart comedy, proved viable during the previous year's MLK weekend.

=== Filming ===
The film was originally set in Chicago but was rewritten for Los Angeles after the producers won a $2.8-million California tax credit. Filming took place in Santa Monica and Marina del Rey, California over the course of 38 days in the fall 2013.

== Release ==
=== Promotion ===
Sony Pictures Entertainment released the first official trailer for The Wedding Ringer on June 19, 2014, a "Best Friends" official trailer on September 25, 2014, and a Restricted "Holiday" trailer on December 2, 2014.

On October 8, 2014, Kevin Hart announced through his Twitter account that he was "doing a college tour" to help promote The Wedding Ringer. Hart said that during this promotional tour, "he is focusing on college students because they are big social-media users" and can help promote the new film. He also encouraged the students to "tweet" about the film.

=== Home media ===
The Wedding Ringer was released on DVD and Blu-ray on April 28, 2015.

== Reception ==
=== Box office ===
The Wedding Ringer grossed $64.5 million in North America and $15.3 million in other territories for a worldwide total of $79.8 million against a budget of $23 million.

The film was released in North American theaters on January 16, 2015. It grossed $20.6 million in its opening weekend, finishing second at the box office behind American Sniper. For the 4-day MLK Holiday weekend, the film grossed a total of $24 million.

=== Critical response ===
The Wedding Ringer was poorly received by film critics upon its release. On Rotten Tomatoes the film holds a rating of 29%, based on 111 reviews, with an average rating of 4.60/10. The critical consensus reads, "Kevin Hart and Josh Gad might be two great comedians that go great together, but there's little evidence of it on display in The Wedding Ringer." On Metacritic, the film has a score of 35 out of 100, based on 27 critics, indicating "generally unfavorable reviews". On CinemaScore audiences gave the film a grade of "A−" on an A+ to F scale.

IGN gave the film a 6.2/10, stating that "the movie is actually pretty funny." ABCNews gave the movie 3.5/5 stars, stating "Hart and Gad make you laugh simply by showing up. Add a moderately funny script, and The Wedding Ringer is a winner." Richard Roeper gave the film 1.5 out of 4 stars, acknowledging the chemistry between Hart and Gad but criticizing the "cockamamie premise".

=== Accolades ===
Award	Category	Nominee	Result	Ref.
Golden Raspberry Awards	Worst Supporting Actor	Josh Gad	Nominated	
Golden Raspberry Awards	Worst Supporting Actress	Kaley Cuoco	Won	

== Possible sequel ==
Director Jeremy Garelick teased a possible sequel involving Vince Vaughn.
