= Colin Kane =

American comedian, actor, writer (b. 1979)

- Born: October 17, 1979 (age 46); New York City, New York, U.S.
- Education: Avon Old Farms

Comedy career
- Years active: 2002–present
- Medium: Stand-up, television, film
- Genre: Insult comedy
- Website: www.colinkane.com

Colin Kane (born October 17, 1979) was an American comedian, actor and writer. Kane was mainly known for his in-your-face style of insult comedy and off-the-cuff crowd work.

== Early life ==
Born in New York City, Kane grew up in Rockville Centre on Long Island, New York with his parents and two siblings. Colin Kane attended high school at Avon Old Farms, located in Connecticut. After high school, he attended Lynn University briefly, but ultimately returned to New York City to pursue comedy.

== Career ==
Previously based in New York City, Colin Kane resided in Los Angeles and then Florida. He had been performing since 2002. Colin's growth in popularity occurred mainly via word-of-mouth from a dedicated fan base. Kane has described his comedy as "an unlikely blend of piercing bite and authentic heart, [an] R-rated act [tackling] sex, relationships, race... and everyone who is brave enough to sit in the front row." Kane has had his own regular shows at Caroline's, Comix, and Gotham Comedy Club, and has been a frequent guest on the Opie and Anthony Show. Colin is currently touring many major US cities including Los Angeles, Boston, Philadelphia, Chicago and Washington, D.C. He has performed at the Stockholm Comedy Festival, and performs for US military personnel through the Wounded Warrior Project whenever possible.

== Recognition ==
In 2010, Kane was recognized as one of the New York Post's "King of Zings" alongside Jay Leno and Ricky Gervais. That year, comedian Dennis Miller called Colin Kane the "next really big comedian.” In 2015, Kane made his film debut in a breakout role opposite Kevin Hart in “The Wedding Ringer,” which was the #1 comedy in America for three weeks in a row. Colin has a special on Showtime, and in 2006 won Howard Stern's "Kill or Be Killed" comedy competition.

== Controversy ==
In 2012, Kane received criticism by several bloggers and comedy fans for jokes he made on both his Twitter and YouTube account. His material was perceived as misogynistic and hateful towards minorities. Dylan Gadino, founder and editor-in-chief of the comedy news website Laughspin, reported on the controversy, citing specific tweets written by Kane. On his Facebook account, Kane requested that his fans comment on the Laughspin article with their opinions on the matter. Comedian Kyle Kinane weighed in shortly after, suggesting that detractors of Kane's comedy should ignore the comedian if they are disgusted by his material, as Kane might thrive on any type of attention.
