= Duplex (film) =

2003 film by Danny DeVito

- Theatrical release poster
- Directed by: Danny DeVito
- Written by: Larry Doyle
- Produced by: Stuart Cornfeld; Ben Stiller; Jeremy Kramer; Nancy Juvonen; Drew Barrymore
- Starring: Ben Stiller; Drew Barrymore; Eileen Essell; Harvey Fierstein; Justin Theroux; James Remar
- Cinematography: Anastas Michos
- Edited by: Lynzee Klingman; Greg Hayden
- Music by: David Newman
- Production companies: Red Hour Films; Flower Films; Jersey Films
- Distributed by: Miramax Films
- Release date: September 26, 2003
- Running time: 89 minutes
- Country: United States
- Language: English
- Budget: $40 million
- Box office: $19.3 million

Duplex (released in the United Kingdom and Ireland as Our House) is a 2003 American black comedy film directed by Danny DeVito (who also narrated the film) and written by Larry Doyle. It stars Ben Stiller and Drew Barrymore, with Eileen Essell, Harvey Fierstein, Robert Wisdom, Justin Theroux, and James Remar in supporting roles.

The film was released by Miramax Films on September 26, 2003. It received mixed to negative reviews from critics and was a box office bomb, grossing $19.3 million against a $40 million budget.

== Plot ==
Young New York couple Alex and Nancy are sick of their tiny apartment in the city and are searching for their dream home. They find a Brooklyn brownstone duplex that is perfect except for the elderly tenant upstairs: Mrs. Connelly, an old, Irish lady who lives on the rent-controlled top floor. Assuming she won't live long, they buy the house.

Mrs. Connelly complains about the plumbing, blasts her television at all hours, and rehearses her dancing and brass band so the couple is soon sleep deprived and exhausted.

A novelist, Alex is struggling to meet his latest deadline, or have his contract cancelled.

When she can't get Alex, Mrs. Connelly calls Nancy at work so she can't work either.

Their dream is becoming a nightmare. They can't get her to move and their noise complaint is countered by Mrs. Connolly's harassment charge against them. The couple attempts to kill her multiple times. They try to give her the flu only for her to tell them she just had a flu shot. Alex pretends that he is fixing her pipes. He is actually making them leak. Once the ceiling (her floor) is damaged enough, they anticipate she will fall through and die. The ceiling caves in but she does not fall. For the last attempt, they both sneak into her apartment to smother her with a pillow. However, she is awake and informs them that they will not win.

Exhausted and desperate they hire a hitman, which will cost everything they have, who finally arrives on Christmas Eve.

After a desperate fight, the building catches fire from a fireplace that was one of the building's main selling points. Nancy and Alex can't leave the old lady to die in the fire so they rescue her.

With no other options, they sell the house, only to find that Mrs. Connelly has passed away in her sleep as they leave.

In an epilogue, it is revealed that this has been a long-running real estate scam. The realtor is Mrs. Connelly's son and the police officer is his partner. Mrs. Connelly has faked her own death so the mark won't return. Alex and Nancy were their latest victims, amongst many. Alex and Nancy relocate to the Bronx. Alex uses their unpleasant experience as inspiration for his next book entitled Duplex.

A final voice-over says that "Alex and Nancy's dream house may have been too good to be true, but did they live happily ever after? Well, read the book."

== Cast ==
- Ben Stiller as Alex Rose
- Drew Barrymore as Nancy Kendricks
- Eileen Essell as Mrs. Connelly
- Harvey Fierstein as Kenneth
- Justin Theroux as Coop
- James Remar as Chick
- Robert Wisdom as Officer Dan
- Swoosie Kurtz as Jean
- Wallace Shawn as Herman
- Maya Rudolph as Tara
- Amber Valletta as Celine
- Michelle Krusiec as Dr. Kang
- Tracey Walter as Pharmacy Customer
- Danny DeVito as Narrator (voice) (uncredited)

== Production ==
In November 2000, it was reported that Ben Stiller and Drew Barrymore had signed on to star in the Larry Doyle scripted The Duplex for Miramax Films. Barrymore's Flower Films and Stiller's Red Hour Productions were set to develop the project about a young New York couple who have a chance to move into a gorgeous duplex in the perfect neighborhood and circumstances arise that drive them to conflict with the current tenant, an elderly woman. In June 2001, it was reported that Greg Mottola had signed on to direct the film. However, in November of that year, Danny DeVito came on board to direct after Mottola amicably departed the film.

== Reception ==
On the review aggregator website Rotten Tomatoes, 35% of 111 critics' reviews are positive, with an average rating of 5/10. The website's consensus reads: "It was funnier when it was called Throw Momma From the Train." Metacritic, which uses a weighted average, assigned the film a score of 50 out of 100, based on 31 critics, indicating "mixed or average" reviews. Audiences polled by CinemaScore gave the film an average grade of "B−" on an A+ to F scale.

Roger Ebert of the Chicago Sun-Times gave the film two stars out of four and wrote that the "murder schemes aimed at Mrs. Connelly don't generate the laughter they should, maybe because no matter what she does, she still seems, irremediably, unredeemably, a sweet little old lady. [...] Duplex is all about plotting; it tries to impose emotions that we don't really feel. We can't identify with Mrs. Connelly, that's for sure, but we can't identify with Alex and Nancy, either, because we don't share their frustration -- and the reason we don't is because we don't believe it. There's too much contrivance and not enough plausibility, and so finally we're just enjoying the performances and wishing they'd been in a more persuasive movie."

Barrymore earned a Golden Raspberry Award nomination for Worst Actress for her performances in both Duplex and Charlie's Angels: Full Throttle, but lost to Jennifer Lopez for Gigli.

On a $40 million budget, it grossed $9,692,135 in the US, and $19,322,135 worldwide, making it a commercial failure.
