= Happy Camp (film) =

- Directed by: Josh Anthony
- Written by: Josh Anthony; Michael Barbuto; Anne Taylor
- Produced by: Drew Barrymore; Nancy Juvonen; Chris Miller; Ember Truesdell
- Starring: Josh Anthony; Michael Barbuto; Ben Blenkle
- Cinematography: Matthew H. Sanders
- Edited by: Sam Bauer; Omar Lagda
- Production companies: Flower Films; Hogtown Productions
- Distributed by: Gravitas Ventures
- Release date: March 25, 2014
- Running time: 75 minutes
- Country: United States
- Language: English

Happy Camp is a 2014 American found footage horror film written and directed by Josh Anthony in his directorial debut. It was released on video on demand on March 25, 2014, through Gravitas Ventures and was produced through Drew Barrymore's production company Flower Films. The movie stars Michael Barbuto as a man trying to discover the truth behind his brother's disappearance years ago.

== Plot ==
In the 1980s Mike (Michael Barbuto) was adopted by Walt and Sandy and was taken to live with them in Happy Camp, a small logging town, with their son Dean. Mike got along instantly with his new brother and was overjoyed that he would finally have a family. This happiness was cut short on October 22, 1989, when Dean is abducted by persons unknown. Mike, the only witness to the crime, can't remember anything about his brother's disappearance, the latest in a string of over 600 disappearances over the last 27 years. Twenty years later Mike's girlfriend Anne (Anne Taylor) has persuaded him to revisit Happy Camp to try to recover his memory of what happened that day. She also persuades him to allow a film crew to videotape the entire process. However rather than have an experience that will help him reconcile with his past, Mike finds that he, Anne, and the film crew are in serious danger.

== Cast ==
- Josh Anthony as Josh
- Michael Barbuto as Michael Tanner
- Ben Blenkle as Local
- Teddy Gilmore as Teddy
- Anne Taylor as Anne

== Reception ==
Critical reception for Happy Camp has been largely negative, and Twitch Film stated that the movie "provides a nice warning to future indie filmmakers looking to mine the nearly bankrupt found footage genre." Several reviewers criticized the movie's found footage angle, as they felt that it did not add anything to the film. Bloody Disgusting commented that the film took the concept of found footage too seriously, as they felt that "there’s no reason to try to pass it as authentic – especially if it bogs down whatever thin narrative there is." The final portion of Happy Camp was also heavily criticized, and reviewers from Dread Central and Film School Rejects felt that although the movie's premise showed promise, the film did not ultimately deliver. Ain't It Cool News gave a mixed review, commenting that although there were better films in the found footage genre there were also many that were worse and that Happy Camp was overall an "entertaining although typical found footage film."
