= Nancy Juvonen =

American film producer (born 1967)

- Born: 1967 (age 58–59); Connecticut, U.S.
- Education: University of Southern California (BA)
- Occupation: Film producer
- Years active: 1990s–present
- Spouse: Jimmy Fallon (m. 2007)
- Children: 2

Nancy Juvonen (born 1967) is an American film producer. She and Drew Barrymore own the production company Flower Films.

== Early life ==
Juvonen was born in Connecticut and raised in Mill Valley, California. Of Finnish descent, she is the daughter of aviation industry executive William H. Juvonen, a Stanford University alumnus and former Marine Aviator, and Pam Juvonen. Juvonen graduated from the University of Southern California with a degree in sociology and cooperative education.

== Career ==
After graduating, she worked odd jobs, including at a dude ranch in Wyoming, as a private flight attendant, and for an artist who was trying to eradicate homelessness. She later became an assistant to Clarence Clemons, a member of the E Street Band. In 1993, Juvonen met Drew Barrymore through the former's brother Jim, a writer and producer who was working on the set of Mad Love. The two subsequently founded Flower Films.

== Personal life ==
Juvonen married comedian Jimmy Fallon, host of The Tonight Show, on December 22, 2007. They met on the set of Saturday Night Live while Juvonen was producer on the film Fever Pitch. In August 2007, Fallon proposed on the dock at sunset with a bespoke engagement ring at Juvonen's family home in Wolfeboro on Lake Winnipesaukee in New Hampshire. They were married four months later. They have two daughters born in 2013 and 2014. Both were born via gestational surrogacy.

== Filmography ==
Producer

- Never Been Kissed (1999)
- Charlie's Angels (2000)
- Donnie Darko (2001)
- Charlie's Angels: Full Throttle (2003)
- Duplex (2004)
- 50 First Dates (2004)
- Fever Pitch (2005)
- He's Just Not That into You (2009)
- How to Be Single (2016)
- The Stand-In (2020)

Executive producer

- Music and Lyrics (2007)
- Whip It! (2009)
- Charlie's Angels (2011) (TV series)
- Charlie's Angels (2019)
