= Johnny Be Good =

1988 film by Bud S. Smith

- Theatrical release poster
- Directed by: Bud S. Smith
- Written by: Steve Zacharias; Jeff Buhai; David Obst
- Produced by: Adam Fields
- Starring: Anthony Michael Hall; Robert Downey Jr.; Paul Gleason; Jim McMahon; Howard Cosell
- Cinematography: Robert D. Yeoman
- Edited by: Scott Smith
- Music by: Jay Ferguson; Judas Priest
- Production company: Orion Pictures
- Distributed by: Orion Pictures
- Release date: March 25, 1988
- Running time: 91 minutes
- Country: United States
- Language: English
- Box office: $17.6 million

Johnny Be Good is a 1988 American comedy film directed by Bud S. Smith, starring Anthony Michael Hall as the main character, Johnny Walker. The film also features Robert Downey Jr. and Paul Gleason. Former Chicago Bears quarterback Jim McMahon and sportscaster Howard Cosell make cameo appearances. Despite starring famous actors and comedians, the film was both a critical and financial failure, grossing $18 million.

Judas Priest, Saga, Ted Nugent and Jon Astley among others, contributed to the soundtrack. The title track, "Johnny B. Goode", originally recorded by Chuck Berry, was re-recorded by Judas Priest for their album, Ram It Down.

== Plot ==
Johnny Walker, a student at Ashcroft High School, is the top high school quarterback prospect in the nation, and is being heavily recruited by many schools. His best friend, Leo Wiggins, thinks he should hold out for the best offer while his girlfriend, Georgia Elkans, wants him to go to State University with her and get a solid education.

The various colleges offer him everything he could possibly want—hot girls, cash, free room and board, etc. One school even buys Leo a car, while another offers to provide him with male companions if he isn't interested in women. His coach, Wayne Hisler (whom Johnny hates), even tries to sell him out by striking a deal with one of the interested colleges to become their next head coach, if Johnny signs their scholarship offer.

Although he has all the skills a coach would want in a quarterback, Johnny is unsure where he wants to go. Being tempted by the offers, praise, and attention, his ability to make good decisions is blurred. Johnny begins to get a "big head", which irritates his family. After he returns home dressed in a gaudy outfit, his mother reminds him not to forget about what's important. Johnny visits State University, and asks the head coach Ned Sanders what he can do for him in order to convince Johnny to sign with State. Sanders tells Johnny he will give him a scholarship, a good education, and a chance to earn the starting QB job, and that's all he'll give him. He tells Johnny that he is headed for a lot of trouble if he signs with the colleges that are giving him gifts and money, which is a violation of NCAA rules. Johnny dismisses him out-of-hand.

Later that night, Johnny and Leo end up in a motel room with three girls. Chief Elkans, the local sheriff (and Georgia's strict father, who has a grudge against Johnny), then turns up after the girls falsely accuse them of rape. Hisler visits the two in the local jail, and tells Johnny that either he can sign with Piermont University, the college that hired Hisler, so they can both prosper, or he can end up in prison on the fake charges for a long time, which would jeopardize Johnny's career. While sitting in jail, Johnny discovers that Leo has something to do with his predicament, and he is disappointed in him. Nevertheless, Johnny forgives Leo.

On signing day, the entire world watches Johnny's press conference with anticipation. Hisler then calls the other four top prospects from Johnny's high school team up onto the stage with him and Johnny, where he announces that they will all be at Piermont that next school year, with Hisler as head coach, and Johnny as quarterback. When Johnny has a chance to speak, he talks about the embarrassment and shame he has put on his family, friends and mostly himself. Johnny then decides that he would rather not play than to be treated special just for being able to throw a football, thus also choosing not to sign with Piermont or any schools. The Walker family and Georgia are pleased with Johnny's decision, but Hisler, refusing to accept this as fact, threatens him. When the other four players refuse to sign with Piermont as well, everyone begins to go crazy. Floyd Gondole, the NCAA recruitment investigator comes on stage, and announces that since day one he's been watching the recruitment of Johnny very closely. He then states several of the worst offending colleges will be under investigation for recruiting violations, including Ol' Tex & UCC (the first two colleges Johnny visited), and Piermont, the latter which framed Johnny and Leo for rape. Afterwards, many of the other schools think they still have a chance to sign him, and beg him to reconsider them. Sports agent Lou Landers causes a huge melee, but Johnny walks away with Leo and Georgia.

Johnny is then seen running down a hallway to Sanders' office at State University, who accepts Johnny, and officially offers him a scholarship, after he says that he just wants a good education and a chance to play football. After signing with State, he drives off with Georgia and Leo. Over the credits, Johnny plays the drums while watching the collateral damage for all of the people caught in the recruitment scandal (including Hisler, who is in jail).

== Cast ==
- Anthony Michael Hall as Johnny Walker
- Robert Downey Jr. as Leo Wiggins
- Paul Gleason as Wayne Hisler
- Uma Thurman as Georgia Elkans
- Steve James as Coach Ned Sanders
- Seymour Cassel as Wallace Gibson
- Michael Greene as Tex Wade
- Lucianne Buchanan as Lawanda Wade
- Marshall Bell as Chief Elkans
- Jennifer Tilly as Connie Hisler
- Deborah May as Mrs. Walker
- Megan Morris as Raylene Walker
- Michael Alldredge as Vinny Kroll
- Jim McMahon as Himself
- Howard Cosell as Himself
- Robert Downey Sr. as Floyd Gondole
- George Hall as Grandpa Walker
- Tim Rossovich as Gas Station Attendant
- Jon Stafford as Bad Breath Bannister
- Pete Koch as Pete Andropoulos
- Adam Faraizl as Randy Walker
- John Pankow as Lou Landers (uncredited)

== Production ==
Filming mainly took place in San Antonio, Texas. The San Antonio school campuses of Alamo Heights High School and University of the Incarnate Word were used as the backdrop of the film.

== Reception ==
The film was a box office bomb earning $17.6 million and also received negative reviews. At review aggregator Rotten Tomatoes, as of September 2026, Johnny Be Good had a 0% rating, based on 18 reviews, with an average score of 3/10. On Metacritic the film has a weighted average score of 10 out of 100, based on 8 critics, indicating "overwhelming dislike".

== Soundtrack ==
Johnny Be Good - Original Motion Picture Soundtrack

Soundtrack album by various artists
- Released: 1988
- Genres: Rock, Synth-pop
- Label: Atlantic

Singles from Johnny Be Good - Original Motion Picture Soundtrack
- 1. "Johnny B. Goode" Released: 1988

=== Track listing ===
Side one
No.	Title	Writer(s)	Performer	Length
1.	"Johnny B. Goode"	Chuck Berry	Judas Priest	4:36
2.	"Caviar"	Myles Goodwyn	Myles Goodwyn	4:34
3.	"Ring Around Rosie"	Donnie Purnell; Taylor Rhodes	Kix	4:43
4.	"If There's Any Justice"	Sam Lorber; Steven Diamond	Fiona	3:43
5.	"Been There, Done That"	Jon Astley	Jon Astley	4:25

Side two
No.	Title	Writer(s)	Performer	Length
1.	"Perfect Stranger"	Keith Olsen	Saga	4:29
2.	"Skintight"	Ted Nugent	Ted Nugent	3:07
3.	"Rock Still Rolls Me"	Arnold Lanni	Frozen Ghost and Friends	3:07
4.	"No Place Like Home"	Bernie Shanahan	Bernie Shanahan	4:01
5.	"It's Not The Way You Rock"	Dirty Looks	Dirty Looks	3:49

== Accolades ==
Ted Nugent's contribution to the soundtrack, "Skintight", earned nomination for a Golden Raspberry Award for Worst Original Song at the 9th Golden Raspberry Awards.

== See also ==
- List of American football films
