= Brokedown Palace =

1999 film by Jonathan Kaplan

- Theatrical release poster
- Directed by: Jonathan Kaplan
- Screenplay by: David Arata
- Story by: Adam Fields; David Arata
- Produced by: Adam Fields
- Starring: Claire Danes; Kate Beckinsale; Lou Diamond Phillips; Jacqueline Kim; Bill Pullman
- Cinematography: Newton Thomas Sigel
- Edited by: Curtiss Clayton
- Music by: David Newman
- Distributed by: 20th Century Fox
- Release date: August 13, 1999 (United States)
- Running time: 100 minutes
- Country: United States
- Languages: English; Thai
- Budget: $25 million
- Box office: $10.1 million

Brokedown Palace is a 1999 American drama film directed by Jonathan Kaplan, and starring Claire Danes, Kate Beckinsale, and Bill Pullman. It deals with two American friends imprisoned in Thailand for alleged drug smuggling. Its title is taken from a Grateful Dead song written by Jerry Garcia and Robert Hunter from their 1970 album American Beauty.

Brokedown Palace was released by 20th Century Fox on August 13, 1999. The film received mixed to negative reviews from critics and was a box office bomb, grossing $10.1 million against a $25 million budget.

== Plot ==
After graduating from high school, best friends Alice Marano and Darlene Davis take a trip to Thailand, despite some reluctance from Darlene who tells her dad they are going to Hawaii. While there, they meet a captivating Australian man (who calls himself Nick Parks); unknown to them, Nick is a drug smuggler.

Darlene is particularly smitten with Nick and persuades Alice to take him up on his offer to treat them both to a side trip to Hong Kong. While boarding their flight at Don Mueang International Airport, the girls are detained by the Thai police and shocked to discover that one of their bags contains heroin, which they insist must have been planted by Nick. They are interrogated and Darlene signs a confession written in Thai, believing it to be a transcript of her statement confirming she is innocent. At their trial, they are sentenced to 33 years in prison.

Alice and Darlene are advised to seek out Hank Greene, an expatriate American attorney living in Thailand. He tracks down another girl who had been used as an unwitting drug mule by a man named Skip K. Carn, whom he deduces to be the same person as Parks, since each name is an anagram of the other. Hank discovers Parks tipped off the Thai police about Alice and Darlene as a distraction to make sure his other mules could get through.

Darlene learns that Alice was with Nick the day of the trip to Hong Kong and believes that she agreed to help smuggle the heroin. She tells Alice she has ruined her life; Darlene's father also blames Alice since she was always causing trouble as a young child. As time goes by, Darlene begins to struggle with the violence and squalor of prison. When she becomes ill after a cockroach crawls into her ear, Alice pays a guard to arrange for both girls to escape, but they are caught and their sentences are extended.

Warned that Parks has influential friends in the Thai government, Hank arranges a deal with a corrupt prosecutor to secure a pardon for the girls if they recant their claim about his involvement and take full responsibility for smuggling the drugs. The girls agree, but the prosecutor double-crosses them. Knowing Darlene will not survive in prison, Alice tearfully takes the blame and begs the King of Thailand to allow her to serve both sentences in exchange for letting Darlene go. The deal is accepted and Darlene is released. She promises to continue working with Hank to try to free Alice.

In a voiceover, which is a tape recording to Hank, Alice tells him not many people will understand why she made her decision to take the blame, but says it was the right thing to do.

== Cast ==
- Claire Danes as Alice Marano
- Kate Beckinsale as Darlene Davis
- Bill Pullman as Hank Greene
- Lou Diamond Phillips as Roy Knox
- Jacqueline Kim as Yon Greene
- Daniel Lapaine as Nick Parks
- Tom Amandes as Doug Davis
- Aimee Graham as Beth Ann Gardener
- John Doe as Bill Marano
- Lori Lethin as Lori Davis
- Lim Kay Tong as Chief Detective Jagkrit
- Amanda de Cadenet as English Prisoner
- Paul Walker as Jason (uncredited)
- Victor Neri as Bellhop
- Ronnie Lazaro as Security

== Production ==
=== Development ===
Producer Adam Fields was inspired to make the film based on interviews he conducted with young American women serving life sentences in a Thailand prison for drug-related offenses, as well as with U.S. Embassy and Drug Enforcement Agency officials in Bangkok. Fields said the idea traces back to "'the self-assurance and naive arrogance I certainly had as an American teenager when I wanted to go to London or Amsterdam or Morocco and I said to my parents, 'I'm 16, I'm grown up, I ride the New York subways—what could happen?'" Fields developed the story with screenwriter David Arata, who expanded it into a screenplay.

Arata and director Jonathan Kaplan said a key emotional theme of the film is the friendship between the characters of Alice and Darlene. Said Kaplan, "You have this relationship between two young women that I've never seen on the screen before. And I just thought the script...treated them with so much respect. And I also think that when one girl [Danes' Alice] is incredibly needy and doesn't want to let go, and the other one [Beckinsale's Darlene] is ready to go out into the world, it's a major rite of passage that's almost a death—and a very compelling story."

=== Casting ===
Claire Danes said she was drawn to the project because of its depiction of female friendship; she deferred her enrollment at Yale for a year to do the film. Bill Pullman signed on for the opportunity to shoot in the Philippines. "Last fall, when I was in Guadalcanal doing Terry Malick's The Thin Red Line... I was seeing all these expatriates we were using as extras. And I got really curious about what it is to live outside your own country," Pullman said.

=== Filming ===
Because the film presents a critical view of the Thai legal system, most of the scenes were filmed in the Philippines. However, some panoramas and views were filmed in Bangkok. Manila-Ninoy Aquino International Airport's Ninoy Aquino terminal (Terminal 1) was used as a stand in for Don Mueang International Airport.

The prison scenes were shot inside the Sanctuary Center for Psychotic Female Vagrants, a mental asylum for women operated by the DSWD in Mandaluyong, Manila. A makeshift wall was erected down the site's grounds and filming took place in one half. Real inmates were crammed in the other half during the shoot. Amanda de Cadenet, who has a role in the film as a prisoner, recounted how disgruntled patients would sometimes throw faeces over the dividing wall in protest. Meanwhile, Claire Danes said in an interview that scenes were often interrupted by wailing women.

==== Controversy ====
Claire Danes caused controversy when she made derogatory comments regarding Manila during filming. In an interview for the April 1998 issue of Vogue, Danes called the city "ghastly and weird". Kim Atienza, a Manila city council member, dismissed these initial comments, reasoning they "could be chalked up as 'mere irresponsible statements of youth.'" Months later for the October issue of Premiere magazine, Danes further commented, "[Manila] just smelled like cockroaches", "there’s no sewage system and the people do not have anything", "[we saw] people with like, no arms, no legs, no eyes, no teeth", and “rats were everywhere." After these comments, Atienza and council members voted for a resolution to ban Danes and her films in Manila, a ban which has not been lifted. Danes issued an apology, explaining "because of the subject matter of 'Brokedown Palace,' the cast was exposed to the darker and more impoverished places of Manila,” rather than the tourist-friendly areas. She added that her comments were only meant to reflect the locations, not her attitudes towards the Filipino people, who she said were "nothing but warm, friendly and supportive."

== Reception ==
On the review aggregator website Rotten Tomatoes, 31% of 36 critics' reviews are positive. The website's consensus reads: "Lacks credibility and tension." Metacritic, which uses a weighted average, assigned the film a score of 44 out of 100, based on 21 critics, indicating "mixed or average" reviews. Audiences polled by CinemaScore gave the film an average grade of "B+" on an A+ to F scale.

Roger Ebert gave the film three out of four stars, saying, "The heart of the film is in the performances of Danes and Beckinsale". Stephen Holden of The New York Times wrote "Although the basic premise of the movie is similar to that of the better, more complex 'Return to Paradise,' which was set in Malaysia, ‘Brokedown Palace’, which tells the story of Alice's redemption from brattiness to something verging on martyrdom, rides on the steady emotional current of Ms. Danes' fine performance." He concluded the film "is good enough so that you wish it were better. Because the character of Darlene never comes into focus, the central theme of a close friendship put to the ultimate test isn't as compelling as it ought to be", and "at the very least, [the film] offers a disturbing reminder that being a willfully ignorant ugly American abroad with an attitude could be a recipe for disaster."

The film was a box-office disappointment, grossing only $10 million worldwide on a $25 million budget.

== See also ==
- Midnight Express
- Bangkok Hilton
- Return to Paradise
