= Donnie Darko =

2001 American film by Richard Kelly

- Theatrical release poster
- Directed by: Richard Kelly
- Written by: Richard Kelly
- Produced by: Sean McKittrick; Nancy Juvonen; Adam Fields
- Starring: Jake Gyllenhaal; Jena Malone; Drew Barrymore; Mary McDonnell; Katharine Ross; Patrick Swayze; Noah Wyle
- Cinematography: Steven Poster
- Edited by: Sam Bauer; Eric Strand
- Music by: Michael Andrews
- Production companies: Pandora Cinema; Flower Films
- Distributed by: Newmarket Films (United States); Pandora Cinema (International)
- Release dates: January 19, 2001 (Sundance); October 26, 2001 (United States)
- Running time: 113 minutes
- Country: United States
- Language: English
- Budget: $4.5 million
- Box office: $8.6 million

Donnie Darko is a 2001 American science fiction thriller film written and directed by Richard Kelly in his directorial debut. It stars Jake Gyllenhaal, Jena Malone, Drew Barrymore, Maggie Gyllenhaal, Mary McDonnell, Katharine Ross, Patrick Swayze and Noah Wyle. Set in October 1988, the film follows Donnie Darko (J. Gyllenhaal), a troubled teenager who inadvertently escapes a bizarre accident by sleepwalking, before having visions of Frank, a mysterious figure in a rabbit costume who informs him that the world will end in 28 days.

Development began in late 1997 when Kelly had graduated from film school and started writing scripts. He took an early idea of a jet engine falling onto a house with no one knowing its origin and built the story around it. Kelly insisted on directing the film himself and struggled to secure backing from producers until 2000, when Pandora Cinema and Barrymore's Flower Films agreed to produce it on a $4.5 million budget. Filming took 28 days in the summer of 2000, mostly in California. The soundtrack features a version of the Tears for Fears song, "Mad World" covered by American musicians Gary Jules and Michael Andrews, which went to number one on the UK Singles Chart for three weeks and was the Christmas number 1 in 2003.

Donnie Darko premiered at the Sundance Film Festival on January 19, 2001, followed by a limited theatrical release on October 26. Because the film's advertising featured a crashing plane and the September 11 attacks had occurred a month and a half before, it was scarcely advertised. This affected its box office performance and it grossed just $517,375 in its initial run. However, the film gained a cult following, and after reissues, it went on to gross $8.6 million worldwide, and earned more than $10 million in US home video sales. It was listed No. 2 in Empire's "50 Greatest Independent Films of All Time", and No. 53 in Empire's "500 Greatest Movies of All Time". Kelly released Donnie Darko: The Director's Cut in 2004. The film was adapted into a stage production in 2007 and a sequel, S. Darko, followed in 2009 without Kelly's involvement. In 2021, he announced that work on a new sequel is in progress.

== Plot ==
On October 2, 1988 in a Virginia suburb, troubled teenager Donald "Donnie" Darko sleepwalks outside, led by a mysterious voice. Once outside, he meets a figure named Frank in a monstrous rabbit costume. Frank tells Donnie that the world will end in 28 days, 6 hours, 42 minutes, and 12 seconds. Donnie wakes up the next morning on a local golf course and returns home to discover a jet engine has crashed into his bedroom. His older sister, Elizabeth, tells him the FAA investigators do not know its origin.

Over the next several days, Donnie continues to have visions of Frank, and his parents, Eddie and Rose, send him to psychotherapist Dr. Thurman. Thurman believes Donnie is detached from reality and that his visions of Frank are "daylight hallucinations", symptomatic of paranoid schizophrenia. Frank asks Donnie if he believes in time travel, and Donnie in turn asks his science teacher, Dr. Kenneth Monnitoff. Monnitoff gives Donnie The Philosophy of Time Travel, a book written by Roberta Sparrow, a former science teacher at the school who is now a seemingly senile old woman living outside of town, known to the local teenagers as Grandma Death.

Frank begins to influence Donnie's actions through his sleepwalking episodes, including causing him to flood his high school by breaking a water main, an act for which Donnie almost gets caught. Donnie later starts dating Gretchen Ross, who has recently moved into town with her mother under a new identity to escape her violent stepfather. Gym teacher Kitty Farmer begins teaching "attitude lessons" taken from local motivational speaker Jim Cunningham, but Donnie rebels against these, leading to friction between Kitty and Rose. Kitty arranges for Cunningham to speak at a school assembly, where Donnie insults him. He later finds Cunningham's wallet and address. Gretchen and Donnie go on a movie theater date, where Gretchen falls asleep and Frank reveals himself to be a teenager with his right eye hollow and bleeding. Frank then convinces Donnie to burn down Cunningham's house, which he does while Gretchen is at the theatre. Firefighters discover a hoard of child pornography at the burned remains. Cunningham is arrested, and Kitty, who wishes to testify in his defense, asks Rose to replace her as chaperone for their daughters' dance troupe on its trip to Los Angeles.

With Rose in Los Angeles and Eddie away for business, Donnie and Elizabeth hold a Halloween costume party to celebrate Elizabeth's acceptance to Harvard. At the party, Gretchen arrives distraught as her mother has gone missing, and she and Donnie have sex for the first time. When Donnie realizes that Frank's prophesied end of the world is only hours away, he takes Gretchen and two other friends to see Sparrow. Instead of Sparrow, they find two high school bullies, Seth and Ricky, who are trying to rob Sparrow's home. Donnie, Seth, and Ricky fight in the road in front of her house just as Sparrow returns home. The bullies and Donnie's two friends leave when an oncoming car runs over Gretchen, killing her. The driver turns out to be Elizabeth's boyfriend, Frank Anderson, wearing the same rabbit costume from Donnie's visions. Angered, and realizing what is happening, Donnie shoots Frank in the right eye with his father's gun and walks home carrying Gretchen's body.

Donnie returns home in the morning as a vortex forms over his house. He borrows one of his parents' cars, loads Gretchen's body into it, and drives to a nearby ridge that overlooks the town. There, he watches as the plane carrying Rose and the dance troupe home from Los Angeles gets caught in the vortex's wake, violently ripping off one of its engines and sending it back in time. Events of the previous 28 days unwind. Donnie wakes up in his bedroom, recognizes the date is October 2, and laughs as the jet engine falls into his bedroom, killing him. Around town, those whose lives Donnie would have touched wake up from troubled dreams. Gretchen rides by the Darko home the following day and learns of Donnie's death from his neighbor. Gretchen sees Rose, and the two wave at each other in a moment of déjà vu.

== Cast ==
- Jake Gyllenhaal as Donnie Darko
- Holmes Osborne as Eddie Darko
- Maggie Gyllenhaal as Elizabeth Darko
- Daveigh Chase as Samantha Darko
- Mary McDonnell as Rose Darko
- James Duval as 'Frank' / Franklin Anderson
- Arthur Taxier as Dr. Tad Fisher
- Patrick Swayze as Jim Cunningham
- David St. James as Bob Garland
- Jazzie Mahannah as Joanie James
- Seth Rogen as Ricky Danforth
- Jolene Purdy as Cherita Chen
- Stuart Stone as Ronald Fisher
- Gary Lundy as Sean Smith
- Alex Greenwald as Seth Devlin
- Beth Grant as Kitty Farmer
- Jena Malone as Gretchen Ross
- David Moreland as Principal Cole
- Noah Wyle as Dr. Kenneth Monnitoff
- Drew Barrymore as Karen Pomeroy
- Kristina Malota as Susie Bates
- Marina Malota as Emily Bates
- Carly Naples as Suzy Bailey
- Tiler Peck as Beth Farmer
- Patience Cleveland as Roberta Sparrow ("Grandma Death")
- Katharine Ross as Dr. Lillian Thurman
- Lisa K. Wyatt as Lindy Connie
- Rachel Winfree as Shanda Riesman
- Jack Salvatore Jr. as Larry Riesman
- Lee Weaver as Leroy
- Phyllis Lyons as Anne Fisher
- Ashley Tisdale as Kim
- Jerry Trainor as 'Lanky kid'
- Fran Kranz as Frank's friend

== Production ==
=== Writing ===
The film originated in late 1997 when Kelly, aged 22, had graduated from USC School of Cinematic Arts in Los Angeles. While earning money as a client's assistant at a post-production house, he thought about his future and decided to write his first feature-length script. The task frightened Kelly at first because he did not want to produce something that was poor in quality. It was not until October 1998 when Kelly felt the time was right to write a script and wrote Donnie Darko in 28 days, the same time period as the film. The time of year influenced Kelly to set the film around Halloween.

Kelly set out to write something "ambitious, personal, and nostalgic" about the 1980s which "pushed the envelope by combining science fiction with a coming-of-age tale". The New York Times homed in on the 1980s coming-of-age story aspect by observing the influence of John Hughes, noting the "ineffectual" adults and the fact that Donnie's "suffering is a way to make him more sensitive". Kelly summarized the script was to be "an amusing and poignant recollection of suburban America in the Reagan era". He recalled a news story that he had read as a child, which he later called an urban legend, about a large piece of ice falling from the wing of a plane and crashing through a boy's bedroom, who was not there at the time and thus escaped death. Kelly used this to develop an initial idea of a jet engine falling onto a house and no one could determine its origin. He then built the rest of the script with the aim of resolving the mystery at the end while taking a "most interesting voyage" to get there, although at this point he knew the plane was to be one that Donnie's mother was on and was from a different dimension. At one point Kelly considered replacing the jet engine with a piece of ice, like he had read. He based the film's concept of time travel and alternate universes from reading A Brief History of Time by Stephen Hawking.

Kelly was adamant about setting the film in 1988, thinking it would be fresh to explore the era and depict a society that he had not seen in a film before. Later he admitted that he felt pressured to make the setting more contemporary. However, he could not figure out how to make the story work in such a setting and retained the original setting. The first draft had Donnie originally wake up at a shopping mall, rather than a golf course. Kelly got ideas for Donnie's experiences of paranoid schizophrenia from researching the topic online. He considered such a broad disorder that is difficult to define was "a great way to ground a supernatural story" in a scientific sense. The first draft was between 145–150 pages; Kelly did not change what he had initially written as he was aware that stopping to review it would have caused him to second guess himself. He presented it to producer Sean McKittrick, who recalled he "had never read anything like this before", and helped refine the script while making the story understandable enough. After two more drafts were written, the pair finalized a 128-page script. Kelly felt that had he clarified the film's ending any further, "the film would collapse under its own pretension", and credited McKittrick, Juvonen, and Gyllenhaal, whom he said were "aggressive" and "vocal" in not letting there be one simple answer to the plot.

There are some autobiographical links with Kelly and the film; he said there is "plenty of me" in Donnie's character. Kelly grew up in Midlothian, Virginia, also a suburban town, where a local woman called Grandma Death would stand by the road and constantly open and close her mailbox. Kelly also incorporated the moment he almost ran over a homeless person while driving, arguments with his school teachers over the curriculum, and his personal experiences with sleepwalking into the narrative. The word "fuck-ass", used in the Darko family dinner scene, was something that two of Kelly's film school friends used during their occasional exchange of insults. Frank was to be a rabbit since the beginning, but Kelly was unsure whether the character originated from a dream or his longtime interest in the animal novel Watership Down by Richard Adams. The novel was to be taught in Karen's English class after the school had censored Graham Greene from her curriculum; it was a subplot that was abandoned in the theatrical version but included in the director's cut.

=== Development ===
Kelly knew that the film's complicated story would be difficult to pitch to producers without a script, so he had producers read it first before discussing it with them further. While pitching the script, Kelly and McKittrick insisted that Kelly direct the film, which hindered its chances at being picked up. Kelly recalled 1999 being a year of "meeting after meeting", all of which ended in rejection, and at this point declared the film "dead". McKittrick said Donnie Darko was "the challenging script in town that everybody wanted to make, but was too afraid".

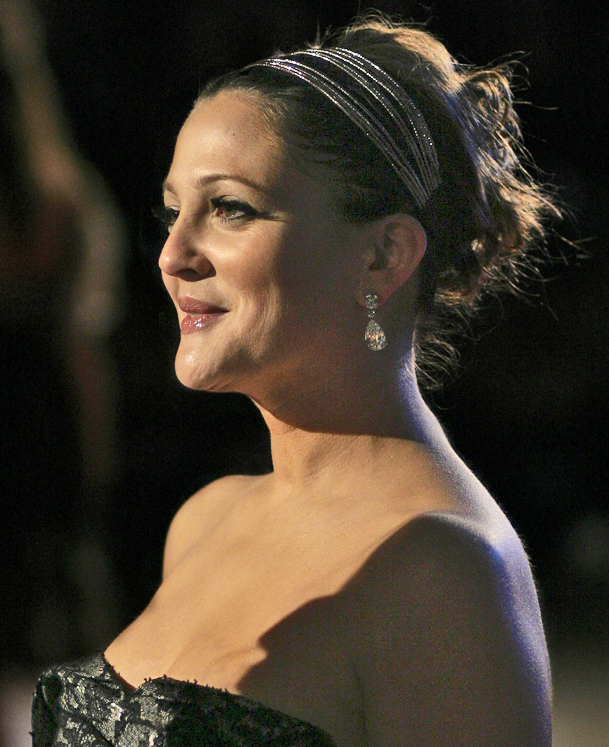
Drew Barrymore agreed to finance the film's production through her company, Flower Films.

A turning point arrived when agents John Campisi and Rob Paris at the Creative Artists Agency took an interest in the script and signed Kelly on. Kelly said his "jaw was on the floor" at the unexpected offer, which greatly boosted the chances of having the film made with the agency's stamp on the script. This led to further meetings with several prominent individuals, including Francis Ford Coppola, Ben Stiller, William Horberg, and Betty Thomas. Kelly's meeting with Coppola was particularly influential, as Coppola drew his attention to one of Karen's lines after she is fired—"The kids have to figure it all out these days, because the parents, they don't have a clue"—and Kelly recalled: "He slid the binder down the big table and very dramatically said: 'That's what your whole movie's about right there.'" Early on Vince Vaughn was offered the role of Donnie, but he turned it down as he felt he was too old for the part. Mark Wahlberg was also approached, but he insisted that he should play Donnie with a lisp.

Development progressed in early 2000, when actor Jason Schwartzman expressed an interest in the script and agreed to play as Donnie. Kelly said this moment "legitimized me as a director" and recalled "all of a sudden people came out of the woodwork, it was alive again". Around this time Pandora Cinema offered a $2.5 million production budget, and Schwartzman's agent sent the script to Nancy Juvonen, who co-owned Flower Films with actress Drew Barrymore. The pair liked the script and wanted to get involved, which led Kelly and McKittrick to a meeting with the pair in March 2000 on the set of Charlie's Angels (2000), where Barrymore was filming. Barrymore agreed to play as Karen, and Flower Films agreed to increase the budget to $4.5 million. Kelly later called the sum the "bare minimum" to make the film.

After securing enough financial backing, pre-production accelerated and filming was booked for the summer of 2000 and scheduled to accommodate Barrymore, who had just one week's availability. However, by July, Schwartzman had withdrawn due to scheduling conflicts. This led to an "exciting" period for Kelly who met several hopefuls, including Patrick Fugit and Lucas Black. Gyllenhaal, who was in Los Angeles auditioning for parts, was "mesmerised" by the script and recalled pulling over the side of the road to finish reading it. Filming was scheduled to start in one month, during which Kelly worked with Gyllenhaal to amend parts of his dialogue. Gyllenhaal was given "a lot of room" to incorporate his own ideas, including making his voice sound like "a child talking to its blanket" when he talks to Frank as he is a source of comfort for Donnie. Gyllenhaal also had the idea to have his real-life sister Maggie star as Elizabeth Darko. Jolene Purdy's audition for Cherita was the first of her career. Kelly credits Juvonen for being instrumental for getting Wyle and Swayze on board.

=== Design ===
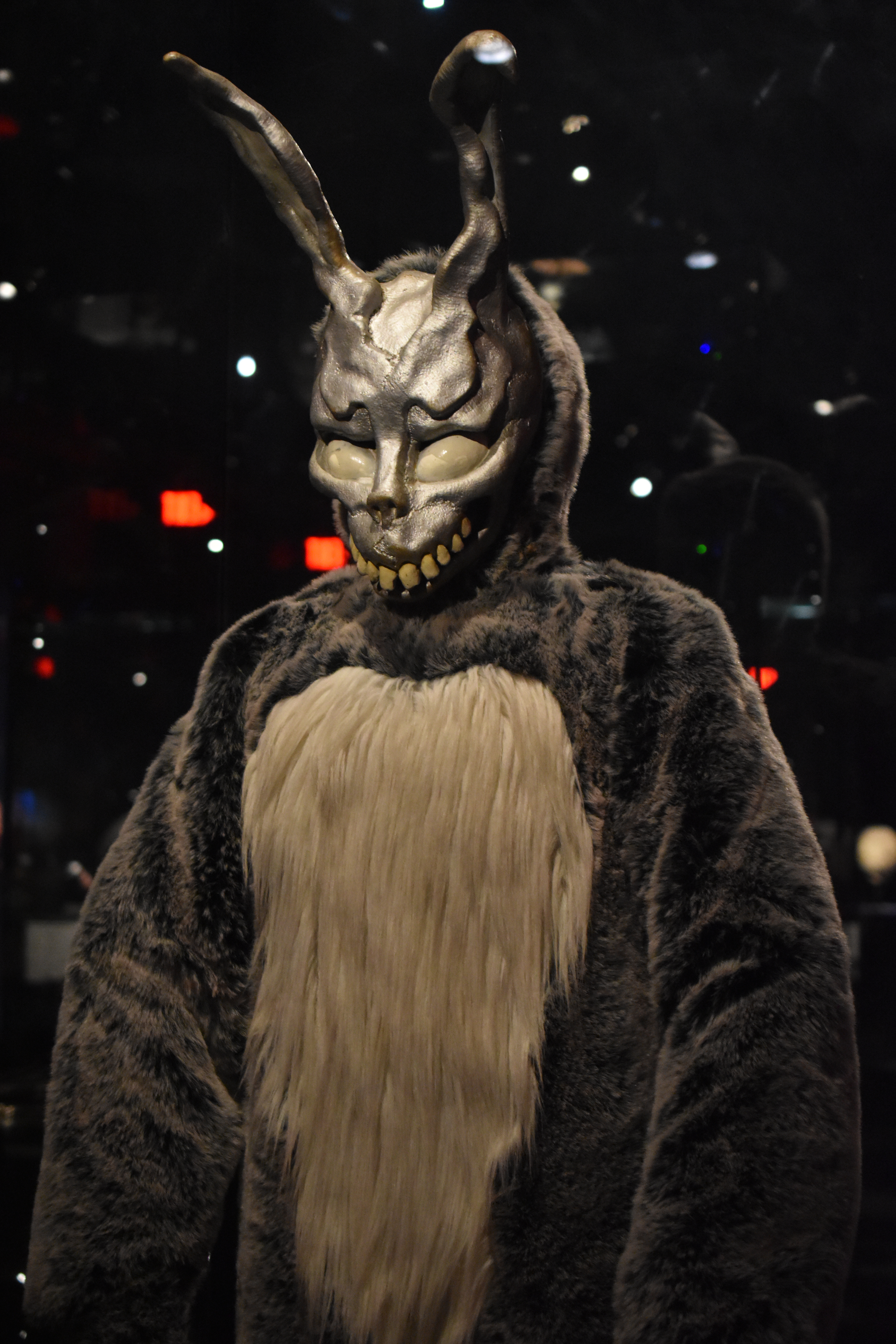
Frank's rabbit bodysuit was crafted by April Ferry

Kelly recalled several people showing him drawings of what they thought Frank should look like, describing them like an Easter Bunny. He wanted Frank to be "disturbing and animalistic". He produced initial sketches of Frank's face and presented them to production designer Alex Hammond, who then made front and side drawings of the mask and sketches of the full suit. Kelly also said that the 1972 novel Watership Down was also the inspiration for Frank. The design was given to costume designer April Ferry who built the costume from scratch and hired a sculptor to create Frank's altered grin. Kelly insisted that Frank's face had to disturb people and create an intense response with the audience. The costume was first presented to the cast and crew at Loyola High School, shortly after filming began. Although Duval wore the suit for almost every scene, a director stepped in for the initial shoot. Kelly recalled, "Everyone just got quiet [...] like, this is really intense. So I knew it was working, and I felt the sense of relief." Kelly wanted Frank's voice to sound as if he was speaking through liquid and "has the power of the ocean", and recalled spending a considerable amount of time with the sound designer to achieve the effect on Duval's voice. There was not enough money in the budget for Ferry to dress everyone in 1980s clothing, so she suggested to Kelly that the pupils should wear school uniforms. Kelly agreed, feeling that it would help to portray the idea of Donnie challenging conformity and the educational system.

Kelly chose Steven Poster as cinematographer from going through a stack of resumes and noted Poster had shot Someone to Watch Over Me (1987) for director Ridley Scott; to Kelly, this meant "you can retire, you made it." Poster had not shot a feature film in two years, and Kelly had to persuade him to accept the job for a reduced fee. Poster had Kelly dissect the script for him at their initial meeting: "We read every word, every sentence, every page, every scene in the movie. I made him justify to me why he wanted that in the movie. I wanted him to be able to tell me what each scene was going to tell the audience." Although the task created arguments between them, once complete the pair knew exactly what was needed to make the film. Poster's reputation and connections with Panavision allowed Kelly to shoot with "an unprecedented amount" of filming equipment from them at a reduced price. For night time shots, Kelly showed the crew scenes from Peggy Sue Got Married (1986) for its "idealised ... burnished nostalgia". The polished cinematography in Donnie Darko "creates a feeling of hyper-reality, suggesting that all is not what it seems."

The film was publicized at the Sundance Film Festival as being the first to feature significant digital effects. Kelly wanted to use them only "when absolutely necessary" and have them relate to the story, such as the water barrier seen between Donnie and Frank in his bathroom. The liquid spears that emerge from people's torsos are reminiscent of the water tentacle in The Abyss (1989), and can be seen as a representation of a character's psyche. Alternatively, they demonstrate the "metaphysical idea of predestination", suggesting Donnie is being guided, perhaps by God. Kelly got the idea from the on-screen chalkboard that American football commentator John Madden used to illustrate the movements of the players during a replay. Incidentally, the spears first appear when Donnie is watching a football game on television. The school flooding was inspired by a surreal photomontage by Scott Mutter, in which a giant escalator descends into a rough sea.

=== Filming ===
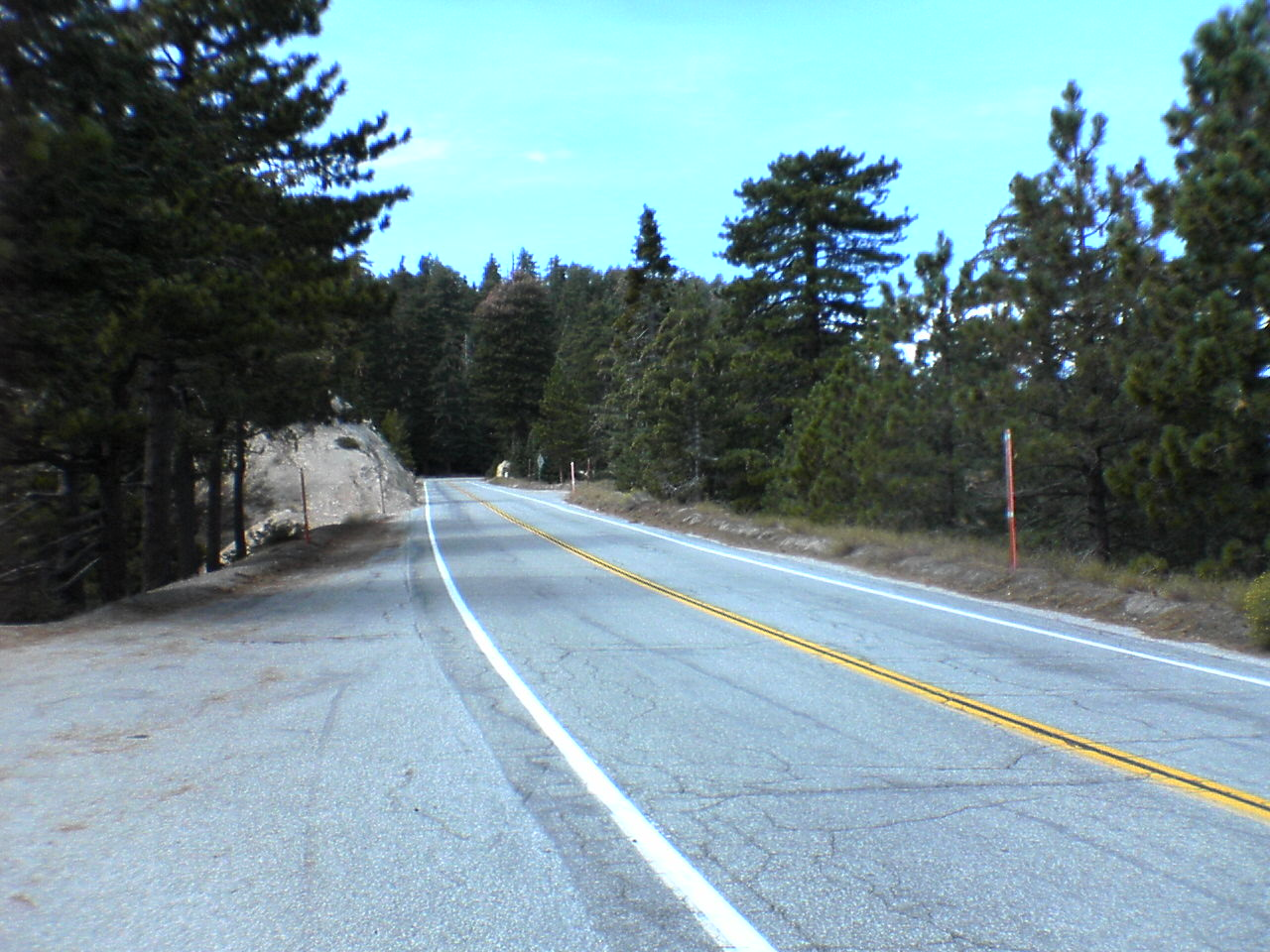
The film opens with a scene shot on the Angeles Crest Highway

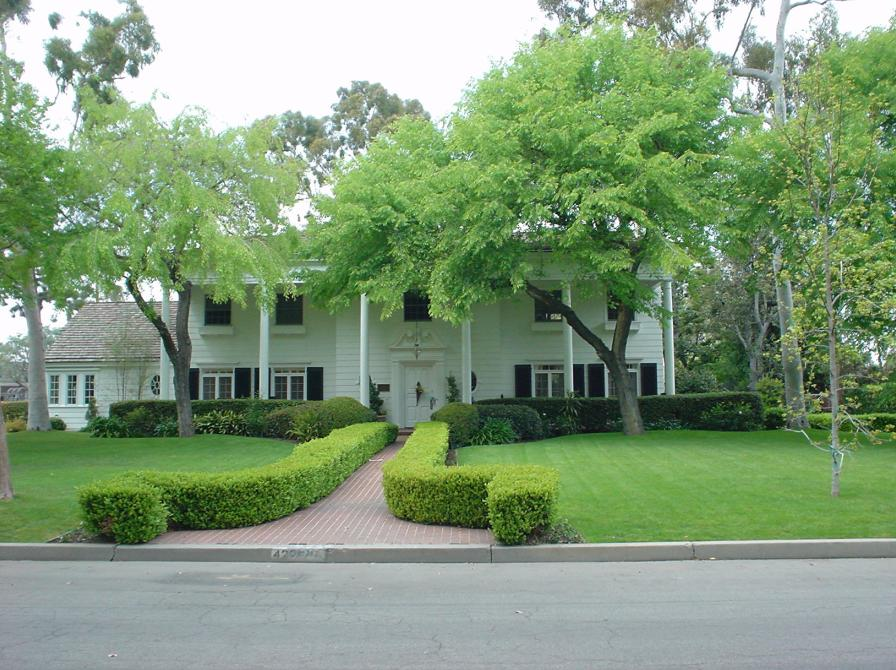
The Darko family home in Los Cerritos in Long Beach

Filming was completed across 28 days in July and August 2000, the same length of time as the film's events. Most of the film was shot in Long Beach, California; Kelly was uninterested in shooting elsewhere because he wanted to portray a strong suburban feel. The ongoing commercial actors strike had created a shortage of work, so additional actors and crew members willing to work for scale were hired for the film. The golf course scenes were filmed at Virginia Country Club and the school scenes were shot at Loyola High School. The opening scene with Donnie waking up was the first to be filmed; it was shot at sunrise on the Angeles Crest Highway. The theatre marquee was shot at the Aero Theatre in Santa Monica. Kelly lost twenty pounds from the stress of filming to a tight schedule, plus the pressure of justifying himself to others that he could direct the film. He openly stated to the actors that he was inexperienced and had no idea how to address them properly, so he talked to them like they were his friends.

Production designer Alex Hannold bought the jet engine used in the film for $10,000. The scene where it falls onto Donnie's bedroom was done in one shot. The shell of it was rigged above the set and sent through using an air pressure gun. Poster remembered people telling Kelly that jet engines do not fall off planes, but during production a "dishwasher-sized engine part" fell from the engine of a Boeing 747 and landed on a beach. Swayze frosted his hair specifically for his part and the infomercial clips were filmed at his ranch.

Kelly's goal was to "seduce the audience" from the film's opening shot. He was attentive to details and spoke to his transportation coordinator to ensure all cars in the film were era-specific. He wanted to avoid going "too kitsch" with the style and costumes and retain a conservative style of the Virginia suburb. The long shots at the school with "Head Over Heels" playing angered the production and line managers at first, who thought it was "an indulgent music video" that lacked dialogue and did nothing to advance the story. Upon viewing the finished sequence, they had changed their minds. Kelly choreographed the scene's action to the song before the rights to use it had been acquired. Sparkle Motion's performance scene was one of the more difficult shots for Poster, who used smoke to give the appearance that light is there and to achieve silhouettes of the girls on stage.

The film was shot with a Panavision Panastar camera and in anamorphic format, which involves filming in widescreen onto standard 35 mm film. Despite its setbacks and the need to have twice as much light, Kelly was adamant. Poster suggested using Kodak 800 ASA film stock, which people said looked "terrible and grainy", but he convinced the producers that anamorphic would reduce the amount of work with low ceiling lights that were common in the locations used for filming as they would be cut from the shot. The anamorphic process required Swayze to kneel down for some scenes so he could fit in the image. Early on Kelly made a promise to Sam Bauer that he would edit his first feature film when he had the opportunity, but Pandora Cinema disagreed with the choice initially. Kelly recalled he and McKittrick had to "fight like hell" to get Bauer onboard, and eventually Pandora agreed. The water barrier effects were produced by Kelly Carlton for $5,000.

=== Soundtrack ===
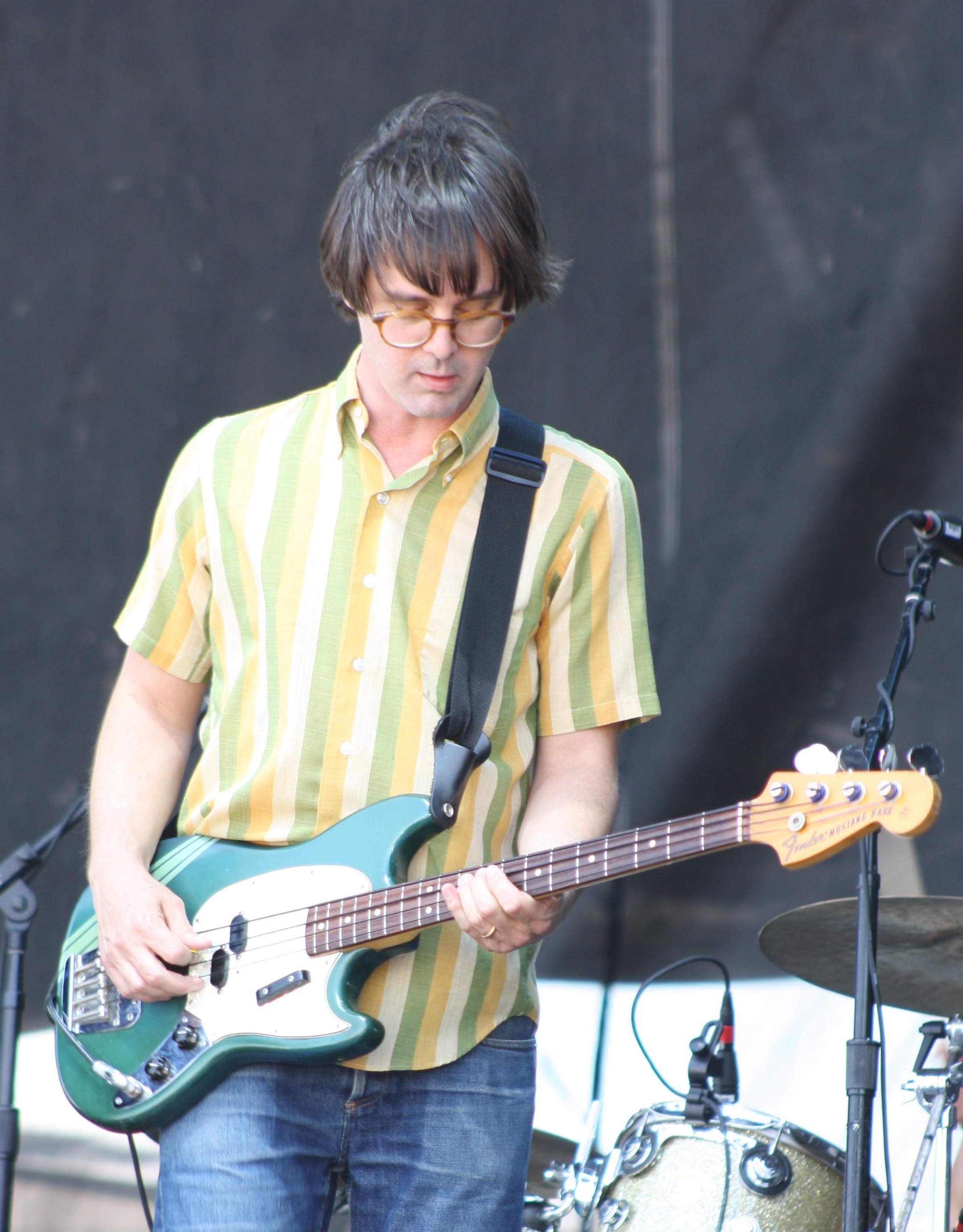
Mike Andrews composed the film's score, also including the piano-driven cover of "Mad World" sung by Gary Jules

The film's soundtrack was composed by San Diego musician and songwriter Michael Andrews. Kelly knew that the film's limited budget prevented him from hiring either "Thomas Newman or Danny Elfman" to compose the score for the film, so he decided to look for a composer who happens to be someone "very young, hungry, and really talented". Andrews was recommended by Juvonen's brother, Jim.

The film's opening sequence is set to "The Killing Moon" by Echo & the Bunnymen. The continuous shot of introduction of Donnie's high school prominently features the song "Head over Heels" by Tears for Fears. Samantha's dance group "Sparkle Motion" performs to "Notorious" by Duran Duran. When the scene was originally shot, the group danced to "West End Girls" by Pet Shop Boys. However, the rights to the song could not be obtained for the final release. "Under the Milky Way" by The Church is played after Donnie and Gretchen emerge from his bedroom during the party. "Love Will Tear Us Apart" by Joy Division also appears in the film diegetically during the party and shots of Donnie and Gretchen upstairs. Despite the film being set in 1988, the version played was not released until 1995. In the director's cut, the music in the opening sequence is replaced by "Never Tear Us Apart" by INXS; "Under the Milky Way" is moved to the scene of Donnie and Eddie driving home from Donnie's meeting with his therapist; and "The Killing Moon" is played as Gretchen and Donnie return to the party from Donnie's parents' room.

The film's end sequence features a piano-driven cover of "Mad World" by English new wave group Tears for Fears, sung by American musician Gary Jules, a schoolfriend of Andrews, and composed by Michael Andrews. In 2003, the cover of "Mad World" was released as a single that was number one in the United Kingdom for three weeks, during which it was the country's Christmas No. 1 of that year.

== Release ==
=== Theatrical release ===
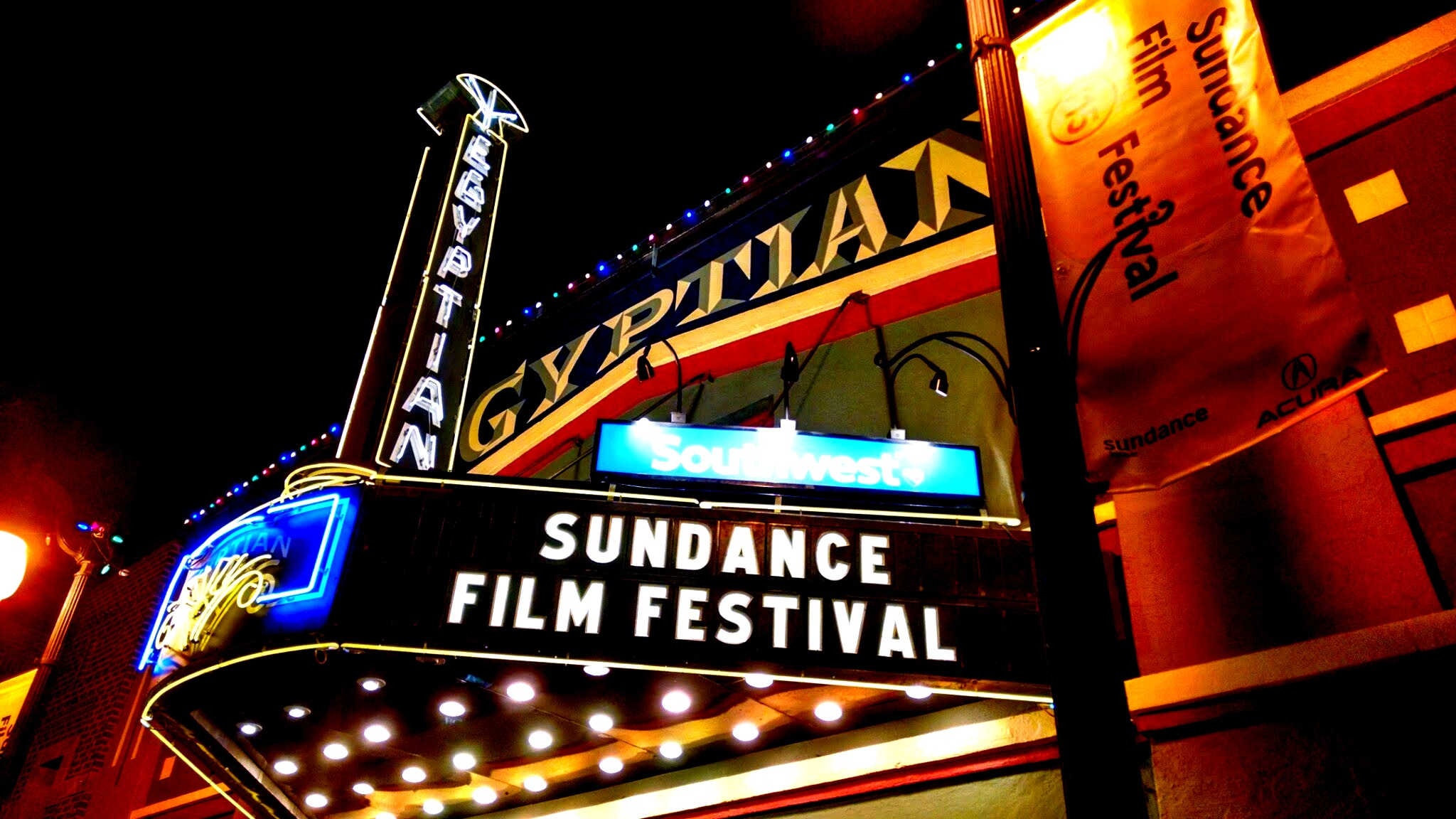
The film premiered at the Sundance Film Festival.

Donnie Darko premiered at the Sundance Film Festival in Park City, Utah, on January 19, 2001. Kelly said it took around six months to secure a theatrical release; at one point, he was close to having it on the premium cable and satellite television network Starz. Donnie firing a gun became one of Kelly's biggest problems while finding a distributor, as the Columbine High School massacre from 1999 raised concerns of the film promoting teenage suicide. The licensed songs in the film also presented problems as they had yet to be paid for, causing a risk of them being removed for a wide release. Kelly was also advised to cut 30 minutes from the film. Despite the problems, Newmarket Films agreed to buy the film and organise a theatrical release in a service deal with IFC Films. Kelly involved Barrymore in the negotiations and recalled getting her to "beg" Newmarket for a deal, who had initially considered a straight-to-video release for it. Kelly credits Christopher Nolan and his wife Emma Thomas in securing the deal, after Memento producer Aaron Ryder arranged a private screening of Donnie Darko for Newmarket executives Chris Ball and Will Tyrer and encouraged the pair to distribute it.

With a deal secured, the crew spent the summer of 2001 revisiting the film; Ryder said it was to get the film "in the best possible shape we could", but recalled the difficulty in the task. This involved an additional day of shooting to clarify some plot holes, such as Ryder's suggestion of including shots of Frank in the "Mad World" sequence. Nolan and Thomas had advised Kelly to insert title cards throughout the film to break down the events leading up to October 30, 1988, which he did.

Donnie Darko was theatrically released from October 26, 2001, to its peak of 58 theaters across the United States; its premiere was held at the Egyptian Theatre in Hollywood. The film grossed $110,494 on its opening weekend, ranking No. 34 on the box office. The film was released six weeks after the September 11 attacks and its trailer featured an accident involving an aircraft, which affected its chances of box office success. Kelly said the film was not "attractive to people in that emotional, very deeply traumatizing chapter in our history". Newmarket president Bob Berney said "the bleak mood and the timing" was the cause of the film's failure at the box office, and that critics failed to understand or accept the film for what it is. "The mood filtered through everything." When its theatrical run ended on April 11, 2002, the film had grossed $517,375. After reissues, it went on to gross $7.6 million worldwide, recouping its budget. Despite its initial poor box office showing, the film attracted a devoted fan base and gained a cult following. Following its release on home video in March 2002, the Pioneer Theatre in New York City began midnight screenings of Donnie Darko that ran for 28 consecutive months.

==== UK release ====
In October 2002, the film was released in the UK, which generated renewed critical and commercial interest in the film. It sold 300,000 tickets within the first six weeks of its release, based mostly on word-of-mouth marketing, and grossed the equivalent of $2.5 million in its theatrical run. Its UK distributor Metrodome Distribution organised They Made Me Do It, an art exhibition that ran for 28 days at cafe bar Dream Bags Jaguar Shoes in Shoreditch, London. The project involved several graffiti artists given 6 hours, 42 minutes, and 12 seconds to complete a work inspired by the film.

=== Book ===
Kelly published The Donnie Darko Book in October 2003. Jake Gyllenhaal wrote the foreword, in which he comments on the confusing nature of the film. The book includes an interview with Kelly who discusses the process of making and marketing the film, and questions about his personal life. The full shooting script of the film is included, plus several pages from The Philosophy of Time Travel and photographs and concept sketches such as Frank's mask and slides from Cunningham's school presentation.

=== Promotion ===
The official Donnie Darko website, donniedarko.com (which can still be found archived here), was an interactive experience and marketing tool for the film. The website was riddled with puzzles and secrets and contained never-before-seen information about the universe of the film, including information about the fate of many of the characters after the film ends. James Beck has commented on the website's validity as a narrative in and of itself due to the website's introduction of new content while reinforcing themes from the movie like fluidity of time, exemplified by the website's lack of concern for the chronology of the movie. Beck further argues that the Donnie Darko website differs from most other promotional websites in that it treats the user not as an outside viewer, but rather as someone within the universe of the film, creating an experience rather than an advertisement.

=== Home media ===
20th Century Fox Home Entertainment released the film for home video several times. The first was in March 2002 on VHS and DVD formats, of which the latter included bonus material, including audio commentaries, trailers and TV spots, concept art, galleries, and a virtual guide through The Philosophy of Time. Berney declared the film "a runaway hit" on DVD, the sales in the US alone brought in over $10 million.

In 2009, the film was released on Blu-ray, containing the theatrical and director's cuts. A four-disc set was released in 2011 to commemorate its tenth anniversary, containing the original theatrical version, director's cut, DVD cut from 2002, and digital cut. In 2017, Arrow Films released a limited edition Blu-ray and DVD set in the UK, taken from a new 4K scan of the original print, with supervision and approval by Kelly. In April 2021, Arrow Films released a two-disc Ultra HD Blu-ray box set containing both cuts in 4K resolution restorations from the original negatives, supervised by Kelly and Poster. The discs features Kelly's 1996 short film The Goodbye Place, deleted scenes, B-roll footage, a music video, trailers, and TV spots, as other features from the original DVD release of Donnie Darko: The Director's Cut.

=== Director's cut ===
The idea to produce a director's cut of the film originated in late 2003, when Kelly and Berney attended the first-anniversary screening at the Pioneer Theatre in New York City. Donnie Darko: The Director's Cut premiered on 29 May 2004, at the Seattle International Film Festival, followed by screenings in New York City and Los Angeles on 23 July. The tickets sold out within the day for the Seattle International Film Festival premiere, grossing nearly $33,000 over a five-day period. This cut includes 20 minutes of extra footage and an altered soundtrack.

Donnie Darko: The Director's Cut was released on DVD on February 15, 2005 in both single and double-disc versions; the latter was available in a standard DVD case or in a limited edition lenticular slipcase. Most additional features are exclusive to the two-DVD set, such as an audio commentary with Kelly and Smith, excerpts from the Donnie Darko storyboard, a 52-minute production diary with commentary by director of photography Steven Poster, featurettes, and the film's theatrical trailer.

The DVD of the director's cut includes text of the in-universe book, The Philosophy of Time Travel, written by Roberta Sparrow, which Donnie is given and reads in the film. The text expands on the philosophical and scientific concepts much of the film's plot revolves around, and has been seen as a way to understand the film better than from its theatrical release. As outlined by a Salon article, drawing from the book's text, much of the film takes place in an unstable tangent universe that is physically connected to the primary universe by a wormhole (the entrance to which is the vortex seen at the end of the film) and which is an exact duplicate of the primary, except for an extra metal object known as an "artifact" — which in this case is the jet engine. If the artifact is not sent [back] to the primary universe by the designated living receiver (Donnie) within 28 days, the primary universe will be destroyed upon the collapse of the tangent universe into a black hole. To aid in this task, the living receiver is given super-human abilities such as foresight, physical strength, and elemental powers, but at the cost of troubling visions and paranoia, while the manipulated living (all who live around the receiver) support him in unnatural ways, setting up a domino-like chain of events encouraging him to return the artifact. The manipulated dead (those who die within the tangent universe, like Frank and Gretchen) are more aware than the manipulated living, having the ability to travel through time, and will set an ensurance trap: a scenario which leaves the receiver no choice but to save the primary universe.

== Reception ==
=== Critical reception ===
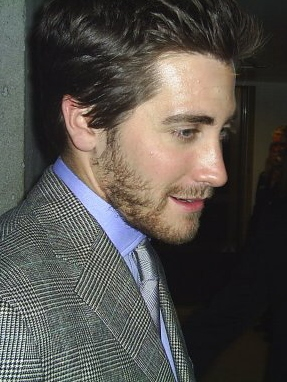
Jake Gyllenhaal was praised for his breakthrough performance.

The review aggregator website Rotten Tomatoes reported that 88% of critics gave the film a positive review based on 125 reviews, with an average rating of 8.1/10. The site's critics consensus reads, "Richard Kelly's debut feature Donnie Darko is a daring, original vision, packed with jarring ideas and intelligence and featuring a remarkable performance from Jake Gyllenhaal as the troubled title character." Metacritic gives the theatrical version of the film a weighted average score of 71 out of 100 based on 21 reviews, which indicates "generally favorable" reviews. Meanwhile the director's cut received a weighted average score of 88 out of 100 based on 15 reviews which indicates "universal acclaim". Despite this, many hardcore fans of the film tend to favor the theatrical cut over Kelly's director's cut.

Andrew Johnson cited the film in Us Weekly, as one of the outstanding films at Sundance in 2001, describing it as "a heady blend of science fiction, spirituality, and teen angst". Jean Oppenheimer of New Times (LA) praised the film, saying, "Like gathering storm clouds, Donnie Darko creates an atmosphere of eerie calm and mounting menace—[and] stands as one of the most exceptional movies of 2001." Writing for ABC Australia, Megan Spencer called the movie "menacing, dreamy and exciting" and noted "it could take you to a deeply emotional place lying dormant in your soul". Roger Ebert gave the theatrical version of the film two and a half stars out of four, but later gave the director's cut three stars out of four.

Other critics like Sam Adams called the movie an apparent "big mess", citing incoherent plot, sloppy writing, and an uneven tone. Adams also took issue with the "seemingly irrelevant" but oft-referenced setting of suburban America in the 1980s, claiming that it "serves as another example of the movie's struggle to find identity". Another review from the San Antonio Current lauds the build-up, citing vast build of mysteries with compelling characters, but claims the movie's ending "leaves much to be desired", calling it cheap and anti-climactic. The film has been praised for its 1980s nostalgia.

=== Accolades ===
- 2001: Richard Kelly's Donnie Darko script won "Best Screenplay" at the San Diego Film Critics Society. Donnie Darko also won the "Audience Award" for Best Feature at the Sweden Fantastic Film Festival. The film was nominated for "Best Film" at the Sitges Film Festival and for the "Grand Jury Prize" at the Sundance Film Festival. The film was nominated for three Independent Spirit Awards including Best First Feature, Best First Screenplay and Best Male Lead for Gyllenhaal.
- 2002: Donnie Darko won the "Special Award" at the Academy of Science Fiction, Fantasy and Horror Films's 28th Saturn Awards. The movie also won the "Silver Scream Award" at the Amsterdam Fantastic Film Festival. The film was also nominated for the "Best Breakthrough Filmmaker" at the Online Film Critics Society Awards.

Rankings

- 2005: Ranked in the top five on My Favourite Film, an Australian poll conducted by the ABC.
- 2006: #9 in FilmFour's 50 Films to See Before You Die.
- 2006: #2 in Empire's "50 Greatest Independent Films of All Time" list.
- 2006: #14 on Entertainment Weekly's list of the 50 Best High School Movies.
- 2008: #53 in Empire's "500 Greatest Movies of All Time" poll.
- 2025: #113 for the "Readers' Choice" edition of The New York Times' "The 100 Best Movies of the 21st Century" list.

== Sequels ==
=== S. Darko ===
A 2009 sequel, S. Darko, set seven years afterwards, centers on the now 18-year-old Sam, Donnie's younger sister. Sam is troubled by her brother's death and begins to have problems with sleepwalking, along with strange dreams that hint at an impending major catastrophe. The sequel received extremely negative reviews. Kelly said he had no involvement in the sequel as he no longer owns the rights to the original. In 2017, Kelly said that he resents being asked about the sequel and that he had never seen it.

=== Future ===
In 2017, Kelly revealed that he had ideas for a new sequel that is "much bigger and more ambitious" than the original. In January 2021, he announced that "an enormous amount of work" had been done on the script. He was inspired to do so after a 2010 meeting with James Cameron, who found the film "disturbing" and had Kelly explain what happened to Donnie at the end of the film. Cameron suggested to Kelly that he continue working on the project, which made Kelly realize that "there was really something big, something epic that could be done."

In August 2026, while announcing the release date for a literary sequel to Donnie Darko that he authored titled The Philosophy of Time Travel which takes place during the first fourteen months after the movie. During the announcement, Kelly revealed that there are plans for multiple feature film sequels in development at that time. The filmmaker detailed that the first installment would adapt the novel, with intentions being that the original cast will return via vocal performance with the release being animated through the use of motion capture technology. Kelly stated that a live action movie set decades later would follow, after having spent years mapping out how the story will continue.

== In other media ==
Marcus Stern, associate director of the American Repertory Theater, directed a stage adaptation of Donnie Darko at the Zero Arrow Theatre in Cambridge, Massachusetts, in the fall of 2007. It ran from October 27 until November 18, 2007, with opening night scheduled near Halloween. An article written by the production drama team says the director and production team planned to "embrace the challenge to make the fantastical elements come alive on stage". A playable skin based on Frank was released in Call of Duty: Black Ops Cold War in October 2021.

== See also ==
- List of cult films
