= Adam Fields =

American film producer

- Born: New York City, New York, U.S.
- Occupations: Film, television producer
- Years active: 1982–present
- Employer: Adam Fields Productions

Adam Fields is an American executive, entrepreneur, and film and television producer. During his career, he has produced movies for Sony Pictures, Miramax, 20th Century Fox, Universal, Warner Bros., Relativity Media, and Broad Green Pictures. He founded his own production company in 1984, producing movies including Great Balls of Fire!, Brokedown Palace, Johnny Be Good, Donnie Darko, Vision Quest, Limitless, The Wedding Ringer, and Money Train. Fields’ most notable contributions as an executive include An American Werewolf in London, Sixteen Candles, and The Breakfast Club. He also produced Bad Santa 2 and Sin City: A Dame to Kill For. Fields also executive produced the multi-platinum soundtracks for Flashdance and Endless Love. In 1990, Fields founded Preview Tech, a firm that partnered with national consumer electronics stores to air studio and network trailers on their in-store television monitors. Fields sold Preview Tech 18 months later in a multimillion-dollar deal.

== Early life ==
Fields was born in New York City and attended the University of California, Berkeley, where he started his first film company, running film festivals in the school auditoriums.

== Career ==
Fields began his career at Creative Artists Agency as assistant to agent Martin Baum. Later, he left CAA to join PolyGram Pictures and within a year became Executive Vice President of Production, overseeing development and production of their film slate. He supervised movies for PolyGram including An American Werewolf in London, Six Weeks, Missing, and Endless Love. Fields executive produced the soundtrack album and single for Endless Love. He later went on to supervise the multi-platinum soundtrack for the film Flashdance, which contributed to the film's box office success.

=== Universal Pictures ===
Fields partnered with studio chief Ned Tanen at Universal Pictures to oversee the development and production of John Hughes’ directorial debut, Sixteen Candles and The Breakfast Club.

=== Independent endeavors and entrepreneurship ===
In 1984, Fields created Adam Fields Productions and worked with Madonna, Uma Thurman, Dennis Quaid, and Winona Ryder to produce films, including Vision Quest, Johnny Be Good, and Great Balls of Fire!

In 1990, Fields started the film marketing company Preview Tech. The firm built a network where studio trailers and network previews were simultaneously displayed on all the television monitors in consumer electronic stores across the country. Fields sold Preview Tech 18 months later, turning a small startup investment into a multimillion-dollar acquisition target by New York investment-banking firm Veronis, Suhler & Associates.

After Preview Tech, he teamed with Jon Peters to develop Rosewood, My Fellow Americans, Ali, and he executive produced Money Train. In 1997, Fields re-established his own production company at 20th Century Fox, where he produced Ravenous, starring Guy Pearce and David Arquette. Fields then produced and co-wrote Brokedown Palace, starring Claire Danes, Kate Beckinsale, and Bill Pullman. The film was based upon his own original story.

His next film was the independent cult smash hit Donnie Darko, starring Drew Barrymore, Jake Gyllenhaal, Noah Wyle, Patrick Swayze, and Katherine Ross. In 2002, Adam Fields moved his production company to New Line Cinema.

He then executive produced Limitless, starring Bradley Cooper and Robert De Niro, Safe Haven starring Julianne Hough and Josh Duhamel, and 21 & Over with Miles Teller. He also produced Drive Angry for Summit Entertainment, starring Nicolas Cage and Amber Heard.

=== Miramax ===
In 2010, Fields joined Miramax as Head of New Content, and executive produced the 2014 release Sin City: A Dame to Kill For. He also launched Robert Rodriguez's film From Dusk Till Dawn into a TV series, which premiered in 2014 and has run 3 seasons to date.

=== Sony Pictures ===
Fields left Miramax in 2014 to join Sony Pictures as a producer and special consultant, where he produced the hit comedy The Wedding Ringer starring Kevin Hart and Josh Gad. He was executive producer on Bad Santa 2 for Broad Green Pictures, starring Billy Bob Thornton, released in November 2016.

== Current enterprises ==
Fields is involved in a number of projects currently in production, such as a film adaptation of Rob Liefeld's comic, Shrink, a reboot of Look Who's Talking, and a remake of Bunny Lake Is Missing.

== Filmography ==
He was a producer in all films unless otherwise noted.

=== Film ===
Year	Film	Credit
1985	Vision Quest	Executive producer
1986	The Whoopee Boys	
1988	Johnny Be Good	
1988	Journey to the Center of the Earth	Executive producer
1989	Great Balls of Fire!	
1995	Money Train	Executive producer
1999	Ravenous	
1999	Brokedown Palace	
2001	Donnie Darko	
2009	S. Darko	
2011	Drive Angry	
2013	Safe Haven	Co-producer
2013	21 & Over	Co-producer
2014	Sin City: A Dame to Kill For	Executive producer
2015	The Wedding Ringer	
2016	Bad Santa 2	Executive producer
2016	Masterminds	Executive producer

Music department

Year	Film	Role
1981	Endless Love	Music supervisor
1983	Flashdance	Music supervisor
1985	Vision Quest	Music supervisor

Production manager

Year	Film	Role	Notes
1984	Sixteen Candles	Executive in charge of production	Uncredited
1985	The Breakfast Club	Executive in charge of production	
2011	Limitless	Executive in charge of production	

As writer

Year	Film
1999	Brokedown Palace

As soundtrack executive producer

Year	Film
1981	An American Werewolf in London
1982	Six Weeks
1982	Missing
2001	Ali
