= Flower Films =

American film production company

Flower Films, Inc.
- Company type: Private
- Industry: Film, television production
- Founded: 1995; 31 years ago
- Founders: Drew Barrymore; Nancy Juvonen
- Headquarters: Los Angeles, California, U.S.
- Products: Never Been Kissed; Donnie Darko; Charlie's Angels; Whip It! Santa Clarita Diet; The Drew Barrymore Show

Flower Films, Inc. is an American film and television production company owned by Drew Barrymore and Nancy Juvonen.

== Filmography ==
=== Film ===
- Never Been Kissed (1999)
- Charlie's Angels (2000)
- Donnie Darko (2001)
- Duplex (2003)
- Charlie's Angels: Full Throttle (2003)
- 50 First Dates (2004)
- Fever Pitch (2005)
- Music and Lyrics (2007)
- He's Just Not That Into You (2009)
- Whip It! (2009)
- Happy Camp (2014)
- Animal (2014)
- How to Be Single (2016)
- Freak Show (2018)
- The Stand In (2020)

=== Television ===
- Olive, the Other Reindeer (1999)
- Choose or Lose Presents: The Best Place to Start (2004)
- Tough Love Couples (2010)
- Charlie's Angels (2011)
- Knife Fight (2013–2015)
- Santa Clarita Diet (2017–2019)
- The Drew Barrymore Show (2020–present)
- Princess Power (2023–2024)
- Hollywood Squares (2025–present)
