= Gotham Comedy Club =

Venue for stand-up comedy in New York City

Coordinates: 40.744308°N 73.996396°W

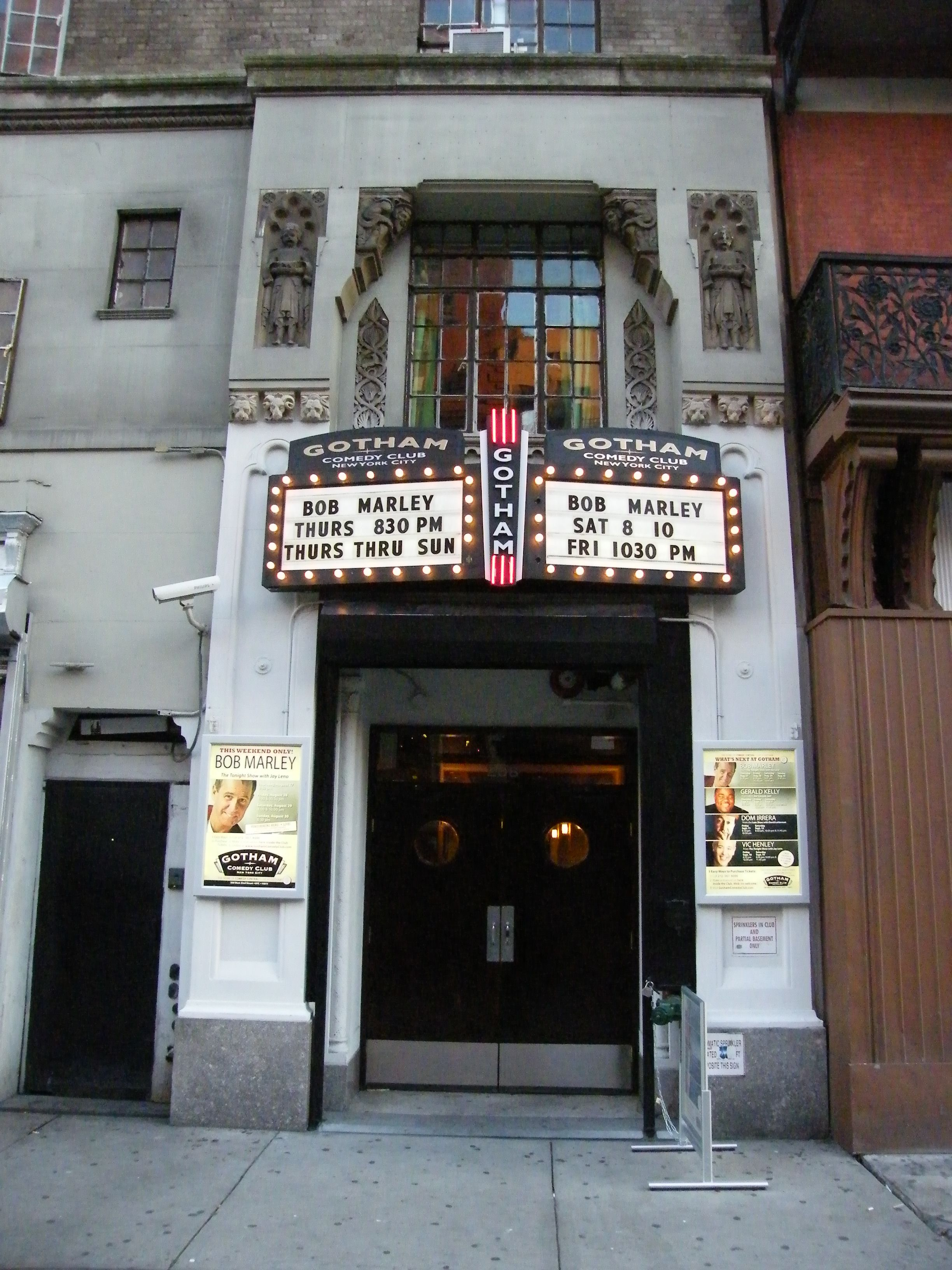
Entrance to the club in the Carteret Building

Gotham Comedy Club is a venue for stand-up comedy in New York City. The comedy club is located on 208 West 23rd Street between Seventh and Eighth avenues in Chelsea, Manhattan.

Several movies and television shows have been filmed at the club. Numerous mainstream comedians have performed at the venue, including Dave Chappelle, Jerry Seinfeld, Lewis Black, Chris Rock, Dane Cook, Artie Lange, Chris Rush, Amy Schumer, Colin Quinn, Greg Giraldo, Tom Papa, Adam Ferrara, Jay Mohr, Dean Edwards, Pablo Francisco, Jim Gaffigan, Gabriel Iglesias, Doug Stanhope, Rosie O'Donnell, and Colin Kane.

== History ==
Native New Yorkers Chris Mazzilli and Michael Reisman opened the original Gotham Comedy Club in May 1996 at a 3,300-square-foot (310 m^{2}) space at 34 West 22nd Street (now occupied by The Metropolitan Room).

In May 2006 the Club moved two blocks northwest to a 1929 structure adjacent to the Hotel Chelsea. The new 10,000-square-foot (930 m^{2}) venue has an Art Deco design with walls painted in red tones and hallways painted "Gotham Yellow." The entry walls feature photographer Dan Dion photographs of Robin Williams, Jerry Seinfeld, Lewis Black, and Chris Rock.

== Film and television ==
- Live at Gotham – Comedy Central began recording at the venue in 2006; past hosts include D.L. Hughley, Lewis Black, Jeff Dunham, Ralphie May, Gabriel Iglesias, Greg Behrendt, Patton Oswalt, and Joe Rogan.
- Last Comic Standing – beginning in 2007, NBC filmed the New York auditions at the club.
- LOL with The N – All four episodes of The N show was filmed at Gotham.
- Curb Your Enthusiasm – The pilot episode for HBO’s show with Larry David was filmed at the club.
- Comedian – Miramax’s feature with Jerry Seinfeld was filmed there in 2002.
- Gotham Comedy Live (AXS TV).
