= The Stand In (2020 film) =

2020 US comedy film by Jamie Babbit

- Official poster
- Directed by: Jamie Babbit
- Written by: Sam Bain
- Produced by: Tom McNulty; Chris Miller; Ember Trusedell; Caddy Vanasirkul; Chris Miller; Brian O'Shea
- Starring: Drew Barrymore; Michael Zegen; T.J. Miller; Holland Taylor
- Cinematography: Eric Moynier
- Edited by: Patrick Colman
- Music by: Daniel Wohl
- Production companies: The Exchange; Flower Films; Ingenious Media; Polyphemus Productions; Wrigley Media Group
- Distributed by: Saban Films
- Release date: December 11, 2020 (United States)
- Running time: 101 minutes
- Country: United States
- Language: English
- Box office: $100,884

The Stand In is a 2020 American romantic comedy film directed by Jamie Babbit, written by Sam Bain, and starring Drew Barrymore, Michael Zegen, T.J. Miller and Holland Taylor. It was released on December 11, 2020.

== Plot ==
Actress Candy Black was once a blockbuster comedic star, but after years of drug abuse and anger issues is considered difficult to work with. On the set of one of her movies, she refuses to work until her stand-in Paula reveals the director may replace her with Melissa McCarthy. During the scene, her co-star Jenna Jones hits her with a solid marble statue instead of a breakaway vase. In a rage, Black shatters an ashtray and a shard hits Jones' eye. The video goes viral, ruining her career.

Candy locks herself up in her Long Island mansion for five years, while facing many legal issues from her addictions and tax evasion. Her romantic pen pal relationship with Steve Grady, also passionate about Shaker carpentry is her one joy - however, she secretly writes as Cathy Tyler, her actual legal name. In May 2019, she is sentenced to months in rehab, jeopardizing their plan to finally meet. She asks her former manager Louis to find her former stand-in Paula, now a struggling actress living in her car. Inviting Paula to her mansion, Candy asks her to attend rehab for her. She agrees, only if Candy resumes acting, with Paula as her stand-in.

In rehab, Paula meets director's assistant Ingrid, who offers her a cameo in a reboot of their former collaboration Saddle Up. Upon release, Paula tells Cathy, but she refuses because filming conflicts with her first date with Steve. Desperate to resume work, Paula, as Steve, messages Cathy, claiming to be married and severing contact. Then as Cathy, attending her first date with Steve, initially planning to break up with him, but quickly falls for and begins dating him.

Paula convinces Cathy to appear in a series of six-figure talk show apology appearances. This puts Paula in contact with Louis (who doesn't know she's Paula), as well as their new publicist Simon. He asks her on a date and she accepts, but they are interrupted when Paula and Steve spot each other (Steve sees Cathy/Paula was Candy Black after watching her on a television interview). Paula and Steve go back to his apartment and have sex. Several days later, the Saddle Up offer is confirmed.

Paula drugs Cathy to host another date with Steve at the mansion, dumping her in the backyard. During the date, Steve admits he is actually Larry Cooper from Ann Arbor, Michigan, infamous for accidentally peeing on the New Orleans Holocaust Memorial while drunk. Cathy's high drug tolerance results in a quick recovery from being drugged, so she enters the mansion bathroom to vomit. Steve narrowly misses seeing her there before he leaves. Cathy and Paula then have a fight, leading to Paula dragging Cathy outside, locking her out, and getting the police to remove the 'crazed stalker'.

Cathy seeks help from Louis. However, when he discovers Paula is who's been making Candy Black's comeback, he drops her for Paula. Cathy then applies for a construction job as a carpenter, and breaks into the mansion to retrieve some certification papers. Steve spots Cathy, and recognizes her voice from the phone. Paula walks in behind him, and the three are in the same room for the first time. Confusion ensues over their respective secret identities, and Cathy realizes Paula sabotaged her relationship with Steve to further their career. Cathy storms out, and Steve dumps Paula to reunite with Cathy.

Steve and Cathy start building a relationship, while Paula films for the Saddle Up reboot as Candy Black. Uncomfortable doing the physical gags, Paula begs Cathy to resume working as Candy. She refuses Paula's offer, and after complimenting her Method acting skills over the past few months, she gut-punches her for trying to sabotage her and Steve. As Cathy goes inside, a group of teenagers take selfies next to a downed Paula.

One year later, Paula is successfully working as Candy Black and dating her publicist Simon. No longer living in her own shadow, Cathy and Steve have a happy, quiet, successful life as woodworkers in a Shaker community with her own business.

== Cast ==
- Drew Barrymore as Paula/Cathy Tyler/Candy Black
- Michael Zegen as Steve Grady/Larry Cooper
- Charlie Barnett as Simon
- Ellie Kemper as Jenna Jones
- Holland Taylor as Barbara Cox
- T.J. Miller as Louis
- Andrew Rannells as Nico
- Lena Dunham as Lisa
- Adrian Martinez as Reporter Banjo
- Michelle Buteau as Ingrid
- Richard Kind as Wes
- Dolly Wells as Second AD Daisy

Cameos

- Graham Norton
- Bridget Everett
- Jimmy Fallon
- Savannah Guthrie
- Meghan McCain
- Andy Cohen
- Giuliana Rancic
- Jason Kennedy
- Kelly Ripa
- Ryan Seacrest

== Production ==
In February 2018, Drew Barrymore joined the cast of the film and served as a producer under her company banner, with Jamie Babbit directing from a screenplay by Sam Bain. In January 2019, Michael Zegen joined the cast of the film. In February 2019, Charlie Barnett, Ellie Kemper, T.J. Miller and Holland Taylor joined the cast of the film.

Principal photography began in New York City in January 2019. In February, filming took place in Lexington and Versailles, Kentucky.

== Release ==
It was scheduled to premiere at the Tribeca Film Festival on April 23, 2020. However, the festival was canceled due to the COVID-19 pandemic. In July 2020, Saban Films acquired distribution rights to the film. It was released on December 11, 2020. It was released on Netflix on April 10, 2021.

== Reception ==
The film received negative reviews from film critics. It holds a 30% approval rating on review aggregator website Rotten Tomatoes, based on 37 reviews, with an average of 4.5/10. The website's critics consensus reads: "Despite impressively committed work from Drew Barrymore in a dual role, The Stand In struggles to find the humor in a premise with no shortage of comedic potential." On Metacritic, the film holds a rating of 38 out of 100, based on seven critics, indicating "generally unfavorable reviews".
