= The Hangover (film series) =

Trilogy of American comedy films

- UK cover art for the DVD box set
- Directed by: Todd Phillips
- Written by: Jon Lucas (1); Scott Moore (1); Todd Phillips (2–3, 1; uncredited rewriting); Scot Armstrong (2); Craig Mazin (2–3); Jeremy Garelick (1; uncredited rewriting)
- Produced by: Todd Phillips; Daniel Goldberg
- Starring: Bradley Cooper; Ed Helms; Zach Galifianakis; Justin Bartha; Jeffrey Tambor
- Cinematography: Lawrence Sher
- Edited by: Debra Neil-Fisher; Mike Sale (2); Jeff Groth (3)
- Music by: Christophe Beck
- Production companies: Legendary Pictures; Green Hat Films; BenderSpink
- Distributed by: Warner Bros. Pictures
- Country: United States
- Language: English
- Budget: $218 million
- Box office: $1.42 billion

The Hangover is a trilogy of American comedy films created by Jon Lucas and Scott Moore, and directed by Todd Phillips. All three films follow the misadventures of a quartet of friends (also known as "the Wolfpack") who go on their road trip to attend a bachelor party.

While all of the films find three of the four men on a mission to find their missing friend, the first two films focus on the events after the nights of debauchery before a party, respectively in Las Vegas and Bangkok, whereas the third and final film involves a road trip and a kidnapping in lieu of a bachelor party. Each film in the series focuses on how the friends deal with the aftermath of their antics, while they are being humiliated and occasionally physically beaten up at every turn.

All three films were released from 2009 to 2013, and have grossed a collective total of $1.4 billion in the United States and worldwide.

== Films ==
The Hangover films
Film	U.S. release date	Directed by	Screenplay by	Produced by
The Hangover	June 5, 2009	Todd Phillips	Jon Lucas & Scott Moore	Todd Phillips & Daniel Goldberg
The Hangover Part II	May 26, 2011	Todd Phillips	Todd Phillips, Scot Armstrong & Craig Mazin	Todd Phillips & Daniel Goldberg
The Hangover Part III	May 23, 2013	Todd Phillips	Todd Phillips & Craig Mazin	Todd Phillips & Daniel Goldberg

=== The Hangover (2009) ===
Phil Wenneck, Stu Price and Alan Garner, travel to Las Vegas for a bachelor party to celebrate the impending marriage of their friend, Doug Billings. However, Phil, Stu, and Alan have no memory of the previous night's events and must find Doug before the wedding can take place.

Lucas and Moore wrote the script after hearing how a friend of executive producer Chris Bender went missing following his bachelor party in Las Vegas. After Lucas and Moore sold it to Warner Bros. for $2 million, Phillips and Jeremy Garelick rewrote the script to include a tiger, a subplot involving a baby and a police cruiser, and real-life boxer Mike Tyson. Filming took place in Nevada for fifteen days.

=== The Hangover Part II (2011) ===
Phil, Stu, Alan and Doug travel to Thailand for Stu's wedding. After the previous film's bachelor party in Las Vegas, Stu takes no chances and opts for a safe, subdued pre-wedding brunch. However, things do not go as planned, resulting in another hangover with no memories of the previous night. After losing Teddy, Stu's future brother-in-law, Phil, Stu and Alan search for him in Bangkok.

Warner Bros. hired Phillips and Scot Armstrong to write a sequel to The Hangover after a trailer brought down the house at ShoWest in April 2009, two months before the film was released. The principal actors were cast in March 2010 to reprise their roles from the first film. Production began in October 2010, in Ontario, California, before moving on location in Thailand.

=== The Hangover Part III (2013) ===
Phil, Stu and Doug are happily living uneventful lives at home. The only member of the Wolfpack who is not content is Alan. Still lacking a sense of purpose, Alan has ditched his meds and given in to his natural impulses until the untimely death of his father forces him to finally re-evaluate his lifestyle and seek the help he needs. Phil, Stu and Doug are there to make sure Alan takes the first step. This time, Alan marries Cassandra, and resigns from The Wolfpack, but things still go awry when the Wolfpack hits the road.

Phillips first announced plans for a third film in May 2011, days before the release of The Hangover Part II. Craig Mazin, who co-wrote Part II, was also brought on board in May to script the film. The principal actors signed on in January 2012 and production began in September 2012 in Los Angeles, California, before moving to Nogales, Arizona, and Las Vegas, Nevada. The film was released on May 23, 2013.

=== Future ===
In October 2020, Ken Jeong said in an interview that the cast knew there would not be a fourth film when they finished filming The Hangover 3 and took time to commemorate its closure on the last day.

In October 2021, Zach Galifianakis said in an interview that a fourth film could happen if it would be a "Pixar family-friendly version". He then added: "I've written a lot of it, but I just send it to the other guys, and they send me videos of them burning it."

In November 2023, Bradley Cooper told The New Yorker Radio Hour that he would be open to reprising his role in a fourth film. "I would do probably Hangover 4 in an instant, yeah, just because I love Todd Phillips, I love Zach Galifianakis, I love Ed Helms so much. I probably would, yeah". Cooper, however, noted that Phillips had no apparent interest in a fourth film, remarking "I don’t think Todd’s ever going to do that." Later in the same month, Ed Helms expressed interest in a fourth Hangover film.

In May 2025, Zach Galifanakis said that he doesn't think there is an audience for a fourth Hangover film and said "I don't think people care".

== Cast ==
Character	The Hangover	The Hangover Part II	The Hangover Part III
Character	2009	2011	2013
Phil Wenneck	Bradley Cooper	Bradley Cooper	Bradley Cooper
Stu Price	Ed Helms	Ed Helms	Ed Helms
Alan Garner	Zach Galifianakis	Zach Galifianakis	Zach Galifianakis
Doug Billings	Justin Bartha	Justin Bartha	Justin Bartha
Mr. Leslie Chow	Ken Jeong	Ken Jeong	Ken Jeong
Sid Garner	Jeffrey Tambor	Jeffrey Tambor	Jeffrey Tambor
Linda Garner	Sondra Currie	Sondra Currie	Sondra Currie
Tracy Garner-Billings	Sasha Barrese	Sasha Barrese	Sasha Barrese
Stephanie Wenneck	Gillian Vigman	Gillian Vigman	Gillian Vigman
Jade	Heather Graham		Heather Graham
Black Doug	Mike Epps		Mike Epps
Tyler / Carlos	Grant Holmquist		Grant Holmquist
Neeco	Mike Vallely		Mike Vallely
Melissa	Rachael Harris		
Dr. Valsh	Matt Walsh		
Officer Franklin	Rob Riggle		
Officer Garden	Cleo King		
Mike Tyson	Himself	Himself	
Eddie / Samir	Bryan Callen	Bryan Callen	
Lauren Srisai-Price		Jamie Chung	Jamie Chung
Drug-Dealing Monkey		Crystal the Monkey	Crystal the Monkey
Kingsley / Detective Peters		Paul Giamatti	
Teddy Srisai		Mason Lee	
Fong Srisai		Nirut Sirijanya	
Kimmy		Yasmin Lee	
Marshall			John Goodman
Cassie			Melissa McCarthy

== Reception ==
=== Box office performance ===
Film	U.S. release date	Box office gross				Box office ranking		Budget	Reference
Film	U.S. release date	Opening weekend	North America	Other territories	Worldwide	All time domestic	All time worldwide	Budget	Reference
The Hangover	June 5, 2009	$44,979,319	$277,322,503	$190,161,409	$467,483,912	#99	#229	$35 million	
The Hangover Part II	May 26, 2011	$85,946,294	$254,464,305	$332,300,000	$586,764,305	#118	#293	$80 million	
The Hangover Part III	May 23, 2013	$41,671,198	$112,200,072	$249,800,000	$362,000,072	#600	#343	$103 million	
Total			$643,986,880	$772,261,409	$1,416,248,289			$218 million	

=== Critical and public response ===
Film	Rotten Tomatoes	Metacritic	CinemaScore
The Hangover	79% (241 reviews)	73/100 (31 reviews)	A
The Hangover Part II	34% (249 reviews)	44/100 (40 reviews)	A−
The Hangover Part III	20% (203 reviews)	30/100 (37 reviews)	B
