= The Hangover Part II =

2011 film by Todd Phillips

- Theatrical release poster
- Directed by: Todd Phillips
- Written by: Craig Mazin; Scot Armstrong; Todd Phillips
- Based on: The Hangover by: Jon Lucas; Scott Moore
- Produced by: Todd Phillips; Dan Goldberg
- Starring: Bradley Cooper; Ed Helms; Zach Galifianakis; Ken Jeong; Jeffrey Tambor; Justin Bartha; Paul Giamatti
- Cinematography: Lawrence Sher
- Edited by: Debra Neil-Fisher; Mike Sale
- Music by: Christophe Beck
- Production companies: Legendary Pictures; Green Hat Films (Note: Warner Bros. Pictures and Legendary Pictures serve as co-financiers and co-production companies for The Hangover Part II, while Green Hat Films is credited as the production company.)
- Distributed by: Warner Bros. Pictures
- Release dates: May 19, 2011 (TCL Chinese Theatre); May 26, 2011 (United States)
- Running time: 101 minutes
- Country: United States
- Language: English
- Budget: $80 million
- Box office: $586.8 million

The Hangover Part II is a 2011 American comedy film and sequel to the 2009 film The Hangover, and the second installment in The Hangover trilogy. The film was directed by Todd Phillips, who co-wrote the script with Craig Mazin and Scot Armstrong, and stars Bradley Cooper, Ed Helms, Zach Galifianakis, Ken Jeong, Jeffrey Tambor, Justin Bartha, and Paul Giamatti.

It tells the story of Phil, Stu, Alan, and Doug, as they travel to Thailand. After the bachelor party in Las Vegas, Stu takes no chances and opts for a safe, subdued pre-wedding brunch. Things do not go as planned, resulting in another bad hangover with no memories of the previous night.

Development began in April 2009, two months before The Hangover was released. The principal actors were cast in March 2010 to reprise their roles from the first film. Production began in October 2010, in Ontario, California, before moving on location in Thailand. Produced by Legendary Pictures and Green Hat Films, the film was distributed by Warner Bros. Pictures. It premiered at the TCL Chinese Theatre on May 19, 2011 and was released theatrically on May 26, 2011. It became the eighth-highest-grossing film of 2011 and the highest-grossing R-rated comedy during its theatrical run, and received mixed reviews.

A third installment, The Hangover Part III, was released in May 2013.

== Plot ==
Stu Price plans to travel to Thailand for his upcoming wedding to Lauren, his fiancée. To avoid what happened in Las Vegas two years earlier, (Note: As depicted in The Hangover (2009).) Stu does not allow his three best friends, Doug Billings, Phil Wenneck and Alan Garner to throw him a bachelor party. He instead hosts his bachelor party at IHOP with Phil and Doug.

Tracy convinces Doug to persuade Stu to let her brother Alan join their trip to Thailand. Stu agrees to bring his friends, including Alan, Tracy, and Phil's wife Stephanie. At the airport, Lauren's 16-year-old brother Teddy, a Stanford scholar, joins them, to Alan's disapproval.

During the rehearsal dinner, Lauren's father Fong expresses disapproval of Stu in a toast. Later, Stu joins Phil, Doug, Alan, and Teddy for beers around a campfire, toasting to Stu and Lauren's future happiness.

The next day, Phil, Stu, and Alan wake in a rundown Bangkok hotel room with no memory of how they got there. Stu has a face tattoo, Alan's head is shaved, and a capuchin monkey is in the room with them. They discover that Chinese gangster Leslie Chow followed them to Thailand on Alan's invite and can't find Teddy, only his severed finger. Chow begins recounting the previous night but passes out after snorting cocaine. Thinking he's dead, the panicked trio hides his body in the hotel's ice box.

Through a tip from Doug (who left the campfire earlier and stayed at the resort), they go to a police station to pick up Teddy, but are given a wheelchair containing an elderly Buddhist monk. He cannot reveal anything, having taken a vow of silence. After finding a business card, they travel to the smoldering ruins of a business, apparently destroyed in a riot the night before.

They enter a nearby parlor where Stu got his tattoo, and they learn that they started a fight that escalated into the riot. The trio returns the monk to his temple, where they are encouraged to meditate. Alan eventually recalls that they had been at a strip club, where they learn that Stu had sex with a trans woman. Upon exiting, the trio is attacked by two Russian mobsters who shoot Phil in his arm and take the monkey, which originally belonged to them.

After Phil is treated at a clinic, Alan confesses that he had drugged some of the marshmallows with muscle relaxers and his ADHD medication to sedate Teddy, but accidentally mixed up the bags. Furious, Stu attacks Alan.

During the scuffle, they find an address and time for a meeting on Alan's stomach. They meet Kingsley, a gangster demanding Chow's bank password by morning for Teddy. They seek Chow's password at the hotel, discovering he is still alive. They steal back the monkey, who has the code in his vest, and escape through a car chase in which the monkey is shot and injured.

After taking the code and leaving the monkey outside a veterinary, the group completes the deal with Kingsley the next morning. Interpol agents appear and arrest Chow. Kingsley, who reveals himself to be an undercover agent, does not know where Teddy is.

Desperate, Phil calls Tracy to say that they cannot find Teddy. During a rolling blackout, Stu realizes where Teddy is. The trio returns to the hotel to find Teddy in the elevator (though he still misses a finger). He had woken up earlier than the others, but became trapped after the power went out when he left to find ice for his finger. Using Chow's speedboat, the four return to the wedding reception.

Fong is about to cancel the wedding when Stu arrives, delivers a defiant speech, and insists he's wild, impressing Fong, who gives his blessing. At the reception, Alan gifts Stu a performance by Mike Tyson. Later, Teddy reveals he took pictures on his phone before the battery died. The group agrees to view the photos once before deleting them.

== Cast ==
- Bradley Cooper as Phil Wenneck, a teacher, and the leader of the Wolfpack
  - Tanner Maguire as young Phil (credited as "Phil - 12 Years Old")
- Ed Helms as Dr. Stu Price, a dentist traveling to Thailand to get married
  - William A. Johnson as young Stu (credited as "Stu - 12 Years Old")
- Zach Galifianakis as Alan Garner, brother-in-law to Doug, who idolizes Phil
  - Aedin Mincks as young Alan (credited as "Alan - 12 Years Old")
- Ken Jeong as Leslie Chow, the Chinese gangster the trio encountered in Vegas
  - William Jiang as young Chow (credited as "Chow - 12 Years Old")
- Jeffrey Tambor as Sid Garner, Alan and Tracy's father
- Justin Bartha as Doug Billings the bachelor from the previous film and member of the Wolf Pack
  - Dylan Boyack as young Doug (credited as "Doug - 12 Years Old")
- Paul Giamatti as Kingsley/Detective Peters, an undercover Interpol agent
- Jamie Chung as Lauren Srisai, Stu's fiancée
- Sasha Barrese as Tracy Billings, Doug's wife
- Mason Lee as Teddy Srisai, Lauren's brother
- Gillian Vigman as Stephanie Wenneck, Phil's wife
- Bryan Callen as Samir, a strip club owner in Bangkok
- Sondra Currie as Linda Garner, Tracy's and Alan's mother
- Yasmin Lee as Kimmy
- Nirut Sirijanya as Fong Srisai, Lauren's father
- Penpak Sirikul as Joi
- Crystal the Monkey as The Drug-Dealing Monkey

Mike Tyson reprises his role as himself and sings a cover of the 1984 Murray Head song "One Night in Bangkok" for the movie.

The film is the Hollywood debut of Mason Lee, son of director Ang Lee.

Nick Cassavetes has a cameo appearance as a Bangkok tattoo artist. Liam Neeson was initially cast in that role, which was originally envisioned for Mel Gibson.

== Production ==
=== Development and pre-production ===
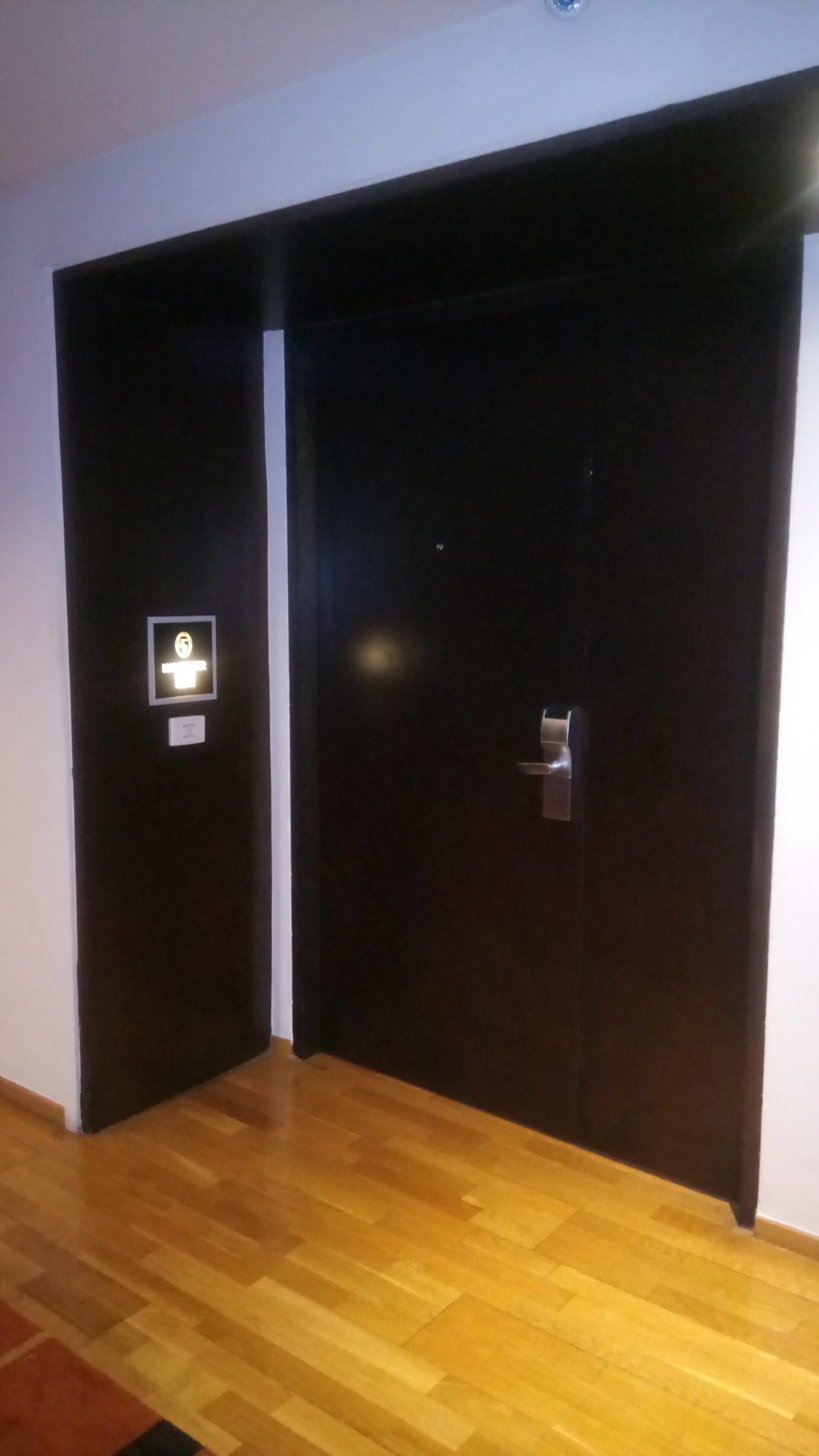
Hangover II Suite in the Lebua at State Tower hotel in Si Lom, Bang Rak District, Bangkok, where filming took place

In April 2009, Warner Bros. hired Todd Phillips, who directed The Hangover, to write a sequel with Scot Armstrong. The deal, reached two months before the release of The Hangover in June 2009, came as result of The Hangover's positive screen tests, and a trailer which drew a strong reaction from audiences at ShoWest. The writers from the first film, Scott Moore and Jon Lucas, decided not to come back to write the sequel because, according to Lucas, "they were done with that story…and didn't want to just write Hangover sequels their whole careers."

Variety reported in July 2009, that production on The Hangover 2 would begin in October 2010, for a May 26, 2011 release, following the same production schedule used for the first film. Also in July, Zach Galifianakis stated in an interview with Latino Review that the film will be set in Thailand, "Well, I think we're going to Thailand. The problem with Hangover 2 is that we have to live up to what we did which is very difficult. So we get, I think, kind of kidnapped. It has nothing to do with the bachelor party. We're definitely not doing that again but we do end up in an exotic place. That's all I know."

In January 2010, Phillips dismissed rumors that Zac Efron would join the cast of The Hangover 2, though Ed Helms stated that Efron would be a welcomed addition, commenting, "I love that guy. He's actually really funny."

In March 2010, Phillips denied reports that the film would take place in Mexico or Thailand stating, "I don't know. There's a lot of rumors. There was rumor also that it was going to Mexico or something and neither are true." Also by March, Galifianakis, Helms, Bradley Cooper, and Justin Bartha completed negotiations and signed deals to reprise their roles in the sequel.

Cooper stated that "we made [the] decision early on" to keep the same plot structure. "I remember we did this photo shoot for Vanity Fair and that was when we first talked about a sequel in a realistic way; and we were all in the room together afterwards and we were saying 'here's the choice: do we stray from the structure or do we run straight for it?' And we all agreed, no question about it, we hadn't earned the ability to take these 3 guys out and put them in a new structure. There needs to be a ticking clock, there needs to be a missed night and there needs to be someone who's gone and a woman who is waiting to get married and a guy who needs to get married."

In June 2010, before accepting the Guy Movie of the Year award on the Spike Guys Choice Awards, Phillips announced that there would be a Hangover 2 and that they were hoping to begin filming around October 15, 2010, for a July 4, 2011 weekend release.

In July 2010, it was confirmed that the film would indeed be set in Thailand and earlier comments made by Phillips denying such reports were a deliberate case of misdirection. The following month, Bradley Cooper stated he believed the rumors to be true and was looking forward to filming The Hangover 2 in Thailand.

In October 2010, Phillips confirmed that the film would take place in Bangkok and Los Angeles and that Galifianakis, Cooper, Helms and Ken Jeong would be returning.

=== Filming ===
On a budget of $80 million, principal photography began on October 8, 2010, in Ontario, California with the first images of production being released a few days later. It was also reported in October that actress Heather Graham would not be reprising her role as Jade from the first film. Later in the same month it was reported that Mel Gibson would have a cameo appearance in the film as a Bangkok tattoo artist. Four days later Warner Bros. Pictures, Legendary Pictures and director Todd Phillips confirmed that Gibson would not be appearing in the film. Phillips stated: "I thought Mel would have been great in the movie and I had the full backing of [WB president] Jeff Robinov and his team. But I realize filmmaking is a collaborative effort, and this decision ultimately did not have the full support of my entire cast and crew."

Liam Neeson replaced Gibson after being invited by Cooper, who worked with Neeson on The A-Team, to take the part. Neeson, a fan of the first film stated, "I just got a call to do a one-day shoot on 'Hangover 2' as a tattooist in Thailand, and that's all I know about it." Although, Neeson had filmed his scenes, his cameo was edited out when director Todd Phillips was forced to do reshoots and Neeson was not available. He was replaced by Nick Cassavetes.

In November 2010, it was reported that Jamie Chung had been cast in the film as Stu's fiancée as well as it being renamed, The Hangover Part II. In an interview director Todd Phillips revealed that Mike Tyson would be back in the sequel. Also in November, it was reported that Paul Giamatti had joined the cast. The next day it was reported that former U.S. President Bill Clinton filmed a cameo appearance for the film in Bangkok while he was in the city to deliver a speech on clean energy. Ed Helms clarified that Clinton merely visited the set and would be surprised if he appeared in the film.

In December 2010, it was reported that Bryan Callen, who played the owner of the wedding chapel in The Hangover, is working again in The Hangover Part II, as "a smarmy strip club owner in Bangkok." Also in December, Australian stuntman Scott McLean was seriously injured in a traffic accident while filming a stunt sequence near Bangkok. Warner Bros. issued a statement stating McLean was put into a medically induced coma but is expected to recover.

Bradley Cooper said that "logistically, to get from point A to point B [was] incredibly difficult and the bureaucracy and getting things done. There are always tons of people around the set and Todd loves a lean set and it was always the opposite, so watching a director deal with that—especially when it was Todd Phillips—was interesting." He then went on to say, in a later part of the interview, that "it was the hardest shoot that I had ever done, that Zach had ever done, that Ed had ever done and that Todd had ever done."

=== Post-production ===
In February 2011, it was reported that Christophe Beck would be reteaming with director Todd Phillips to score the film. The project marks the fourth collaboration between Beck and Philips, who also worked together on School for Scoundrels, The Hangover and Due Date.

In April 2011, Variety reported that Liam Neeson's cameo as a Bangkok tattoo artist had been accidentally cut and Nick Cassavetes had been re-cast in the role. While editing, Phillips cut the scene that immediately followed Neeson's cameo, meaning it no longer had the information necessary to logically get the main characters to the situation in the next scene. Three weeks later, Phillips decided to reshoot the scene, but with Neeson in London filming Wrath of the Titans, the actor was no longer available. Phillips explained, "We were in a complete time crunch so I called up Nick and asked if he would do the part. He came in and crushed it and that is the scene that you will ultimately see in the film. [I'm excited for everyone] to see the film. It turned out great".

== Soundtrack ==
The soundtrack was released on May 24, 2011, by WaterTower Music. The soundtrack contains 12 songs from the film, along with eight dialogue clips from the film. Though the song "Monster", by Kanye West featuring Jay-Z, Rick Ross, Bon Iver, and Nicki Minaj, was featured in the film, it does not appear on the soundtrack.

Among the songs included on the album is Ed Helms' version of the Billy Joel song "Allentown", rewritten in the spirit of his popular "Stu's Song" from the soundtrack of 2009's The Hangover. Additional music includes a song from Danzig, along with music from the Ska Rangers, Kanye West, Mark Lanegan, Deadmau5, Wolfmother, Billy Joel, and more.

== Release ==
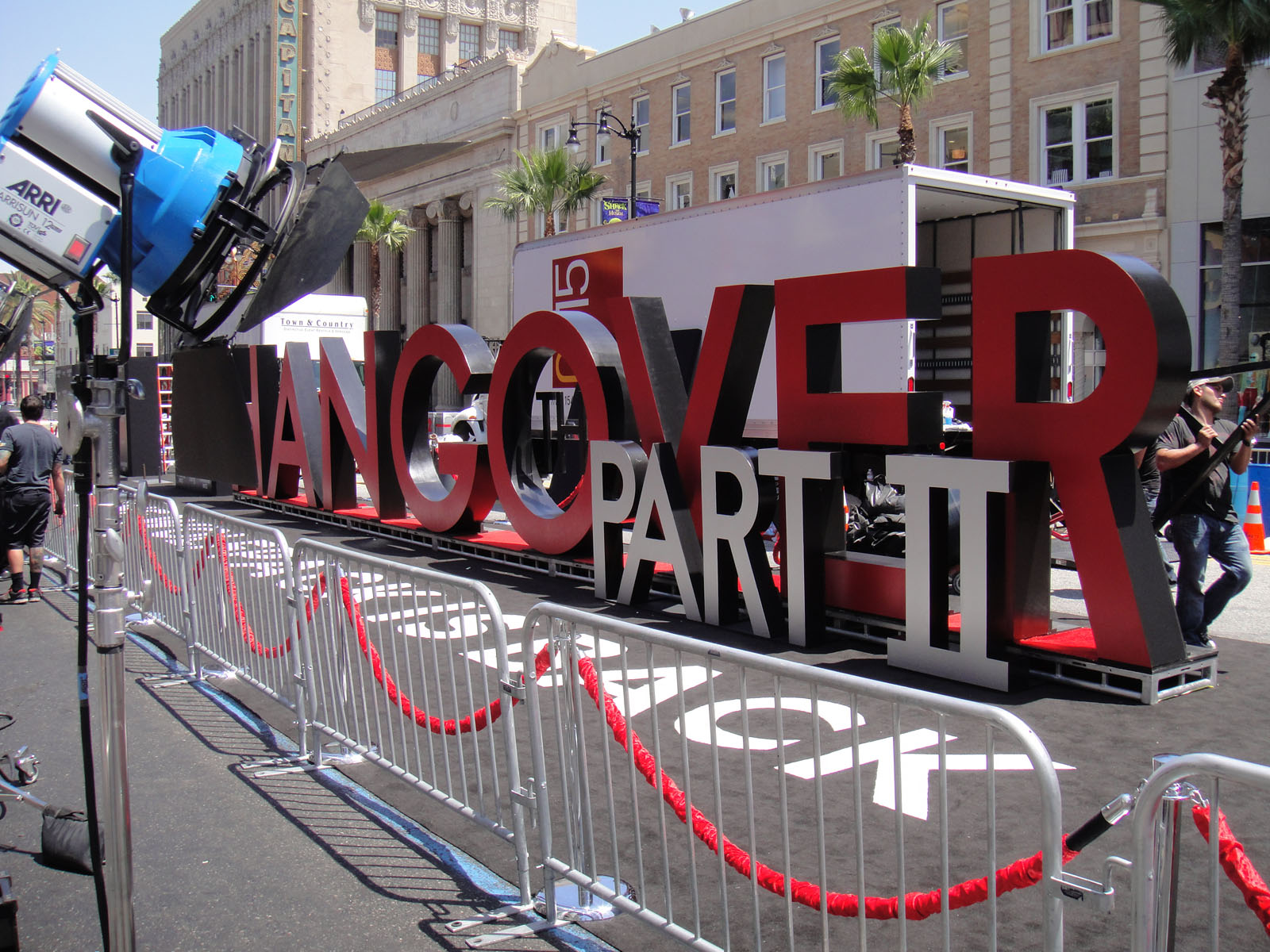
The marquee at The Hangover Part II premiere outside Grauman's Chinese Theatre in Hollywood, California

The Hangover Part II held its premiere on May 19, 2011, at Grauman's Chinese Theatre in Hollywood, California. And it was theatrically released on May 26, 2011, in the United States.

=== Marketing ===
The first teaser trailer was released online in February 2011. The first full trailer was released in April 2011. Later in the same month Warner Bros. Pictures pulled the trailer from theaters for violating an MPAA rule stating that films can only trailer before similarly rated movies. The trailer for the R-rated comedy was being promoted at screenings for the PG-13-rated Source Code against MPAA regulations. Warner Bros. released a statement saying, "In our haste to meet the placement schedule for this trailer, we failed to properly vet the final version with the MPAA. We acted immediately to correct the mistake and removed the trailer from screens".

=== Lawsuits ===
==== Tattoo ====
In the film, Stu wakes up with a copy of Mike Tyson's tattoo. In April 2011, tattoo artist S. Victor Whitmill, who designed and inked Tyson's tattoo, filed a lawsuit against Warner Bros. for copyright infringement, requesting an injunction against using the tattoo in the movie or its promotional materials. Warner Bros. asserted several defenses, including that tattoos are not copyrightable. Judge Catherine D. Perry denied the injunction due to harm to other businesses but allowed the case to go forward, calling most of the arguments put forward by Warner Bros. were "just silly" and affirming the copyrightability of tattoos. Warner Bros. said it would digitally modify the tattoo in the home video release if no agreement was reached; it settled with Whitmill on June 20 under undisclosed terms.

==== Stuntman ====
In 2011, Scott McLean, an Australian stuntman who was injured and suffered brain damage while filming in Bangkok sued Warner Bros. The case was settled out of court for an undisclosed sum, though several years later McLean was still fighting Warner Bros, who were disputing ongoing medical costs incurred in treatment for the injuries he sustained at work.

==== Louis Vuitton luggage ====
In June 2012, Warner Bros. successfully defended a lawsuit brought against them by Louis Vuitton over the use of a fake case in one scene.

=== Home media ===
The Hangover Part II was released on DVD and Blu-ray on December 6, 2011, in the United States by Warner Home Video, on December 5 in the United Kingdom and on November 30 in the Netherlands. The film was made available in four formats: DVD, UMD, Blu-ray, and a Blu-ray combo pack which included both high- and standard-definition versions of the film and an UltraViolet digital copy of the film. It was the last movie to officially be released on UMD for the PlayStation Portable.

== Reception ==
=== Box office ===
The Hangover Part II grossed $254.5 million in North America and $332.3 million in other territories for a worldwide gross of $586.8 million, against a budget of $80 million. It was the eighth-highest-grossing film of 2011. In its opening weekend, it earned $177.8 million, which was the highest-grossing worldwide opening for a comedy film. On the weekend of June 17–19, 2011, it out-grossed its predecessor in worldwide earnings to become the highest-grossing R-rated comedy of all time.

==== United States and Canada ====
The film was released on Thursday, May 26, 2011, in North America, coinciding with the U.S. Memorial Day weekend. During launch midnight showings in 2,600 theaters, the film earned $10.4 million, breaking the record for the biggest midnight opening for an R-rated film, replacing Paranormal Activity (2007) with $6.3 million. The film opened in a further 1,015 theaters during the launch day for a total of 3,615—becoming the widest opening ever for an R-rated film—and earned a further $21.2 million to accrue a launch-day total of $31.6 million; nearly doubling The Hangover's Friday launch opening ($16.7 million). By this point, it had the third-highest Thursday opening of any film, behind The Matrix Reloaded ($37.5 million) and Star Wars: Episode III – Revenge of the Sith ($50 million).

This amount broke two further records; the highest-grossing opening day for a live-action comedy and the highest-grossing opening day for an R-rated comedy film, replacing Sex and the City (2008) with $26.7 million. According to exit polling, the launch day audience was 51 percent female and 41 percent were aged between 18 and 24. On May 27, the film took an additional $30.0 million, dropping only 5 percent from the takings of the previous day and becoming the highest-grossing Friday for a live-action comedy. The three-day (Friday–Sunday) opening weekend accumulated $85,946,294—an average of $23,923 per theater—becoming the highest-grossing opening weekend for a comedy film, the highest-grossing opening weekend for a live-action comedy, replacing Austin Powers in Goldmember ($73 million), the highest-grossing opening weekend for an R-rated comedy, replacing Sex and the City ($79 million) and the second-highest-grossing opening weekend of all time for an R-rated film, after The Matrix Reloaded ($91.7 million).

For the Memorial Day four-day weekend, the film amassed $103.4 million to become the fourth-highest-grossing Memorial Day weekend opening. In its second weekend the film gross dropped 64 percent from the previous weekend—while the original film dropped only 27 percent during its second weekend—and grossed $31.4 million. The film ended its box office run on September 15, 2011, on 113th day of its release.

==== International market ====
The Hangover Part II debuted in 40 countries internationally over the weekend of May 26–29, 2011, across 5,170 screens. In total, the film accrued $60.3 million from its Friday-through-Monday opening weekend, more than tripling the international gross of The Hangover's debut in the same territories. The highest weekend gross came from the United Kingdom where the film earned £10,409,017 from 469 screens, breaking the record for the highest-grossing opening for a U.S. comedy, but this record was overtaken by The Inbetweeners Movie (£13,216,736). Australia accrued a gross of $12.1 million to replace Sex and the City in the country as the highest-grossing opening for an MA-rated film—no-one under the age of 15 permitted.

The film took $8.7 million in the Netherlands and $6.2 million in France and $3.1 million in Italy ($4.6 million with previews); a five-fold increase over the opening-weekend gross of The Hangover. On its second weekend, the film accrued $63.8 million from 53 territories, placing it second behind Pirates of the Caribbean: On Stranger Tides, the film having earned 79 percent of its predecessor's entire overseas run. On the weekend of June 10–12, 2011, it surpassed its predecessor and There's Something About Mary in international earnings to become the highest-grossing R-rated comedy overseas.

=== Critical reception ===
On Rotten Tomatoes, the film has an approval percentage of 35% based on 246 reviews, with the critics consensus reading: "A crueler, darker, raunchier carbon copy of the first installment, The Hangover Part II lacks the element of surprise -- and most of the joy -- that helped make the original a hit." On Metacritic, the film has a score of 44 out of 100 based on 40 critic reviews, meaning "Mixed or Average". Audiences polled by CinemaScore gave the film an average grade of "A−" on an A+ to F scale.

Andrew Barker of Variety gave the film a middling review, stating, "The stock dismissal 'more of the same' has rarely been more accurately applied to a sequel than to The Hangover Part II, which ranks as little more than a faded copy of its predecessor superimposed on a more brightly colored background". Christy Lemire of the Associated Press said, "Giving the people what they want is one thing. Making nearly the exact same movie a second time, but shifting the setting to Thailand, is just … what, lazy? Arrogant? Maybe a combination of the two". Roger Ebert of the Chicago Sun-Times gave the film two stars out of four stating, "The Hangover Part II plays like a challenge to the audience's capacity for raunchiness. It gets laughs, but some of them are in disbelief".

Conversely, Michael Rechtshaffen of The Hollywood Reporter gave The Hangover Part II a positive review remarking, "What happens in Bangkok isn't as much fun as when it happened in Vegas, but it's still worth the trip".

Crystal, a capuchin monkey who also appeared in the Night at the Museum films, portrays the drug-dealing monkey. Director Todd Phillips raised concerns after he joked that Crystal had become addicted to cigarettes after learning to smoke them for the film. Philips later explained that Crystal never actually held a lit cigarette on the film's set and the smoke was added digitally in post-production. Despite this, PETA protested about Crystal's appearance in the film for use of exotic animals for entertainment purposes and the film does not carry the American Humane Association's disclaimer that "no animals were harmed" since the group was denied set visits.

In an interview with New York magazine, Ken Jeong responded to criticisms of the character Mr. Chow as an offensive caricature and stated doing the character was "very cathartic" for him and said the character "has the inflections of Vietnamese, with kind of the anger of my own Korean nature" although "it's definitely not about an accent, or a stereotype."

The film has also been criticized for its portrayal of trans women. In the film, Stu finds out that, while drunk the previous night, he had sex with a trans woman. He reacts with shock and disgust and he calls the woman a "man with boobies".

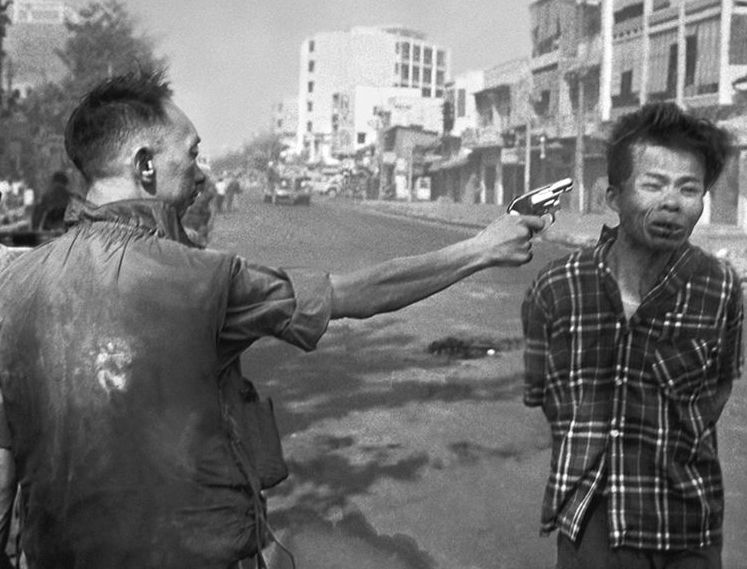
The film's closing montage includes a photo that mimics Eddie Adams' famous photograph of the Execution of Nguyễn Văn Lém

As the film comes to a close, many photos are revealed depicting the events of the previous night. Among them is a photo where Phil points a gun at Chow's head, mimicking Eddie Adams' famous photograph of the Execution of Nguyễn Văn Lém during the Vietnam War. Film critic Roger Ebert was amongst those who criticized use of the photo, calling it "a cruel shot that director Todd Phillips should never, ever have used."

=== Accolades ===
Group	Category	Recipient	Result
2011 Teen Choice Awards	Choice Movie Actor: Comedy	Ed Helms	Nominated
2011 Teen Choice Awards	Choice Movie Actor: Comedy	Zach Galifianakis	Nominated
2011 Teen Choice Awards	Choice Movie: Chemistry	Bradley Cooper, Ed Helms and Zach Galifianakis	Nominated
2011 Teen Choice Awards	Choice Hissy Fit	Ed Helms	Won
2011 Teen Choice Awards	Choice Movie: Male Scene Stealer	Ken Jeong	Nominated
2011 Teen Choice Awards	Choice Movie: Female Scene Stealer	Crystal the Monkey	Nominated
2012 People's Choice Awards	Favorite Comedy Movie		Nominated
2012 People's Choice Awards	Favorite Ensemble Movie Cast		Nominated
2012 People's Choice Awards	Favorite Comedic Movie Actor	Bradley Cooper	Nominated
32nd Golden Raspberry Awards	Worst Supporting Actor	Ken Jeong	Nominated
32nd Golden Raspberry Awards	Worst Prequel, Remake, Rip-off or Sequel		Nominated
MTV Movie Awards	Best Comedic Performance	Zach Galifianakis	Nominated
