= The Hangover Part III =

2013 film by Todd Phillips

- Theatrical release poster
- Directed by: Todd Phillips
- Written by: Todd Phillips; Craig Mazin
- Based on: The Hangover by Jon Lucas; Scott Moore
- Produced by: Todd Phillips; Dan Goldberg
- Starring: Bradley Cooper; Ed Helms; Zach Galifianakis; Ken Jeong; Heather Graham; Jeffrey Tambor; Justin Bartha; John Goodman
- Cinematography: Lawrence Sher
- Edited by: Debra Neil-Fisher; Jeff Groth
- Music by: Christophe Beck
- Production companies: Legendary Pictures; Green Hat Films (Note: Warner Bros. Pictures and Legendary Pictures serve as co-financiers and co-production companies for The Hangover Part III, while Green Hat Films is credited as the production company.)
- Distributed by: Warner Bros. Pictures
- Release dates: May 20, 2013 (Westwood Village Theatre); May 23, 2013 (United States)
- Running time: 100 minutes
- Country: United States
- Language: English
- Budget: $103 million
- Box office: $362 million

The Hangover Part III is a 2013 American comedy film co-produced and directed by Todd Phillips from a script he wrote with Craig Mazin. It is the sequel to The Hangover Part II (2011) and the final installment of The Hangover trilogy. The film stars Bradley Cooper, Ed Helms, Zach Galifianakis, Ken Jeong, Justin Bartha, Mike Epps, Sasha Barrese, Gillian Vigman, Mike Vallely, Grant Holmquist, Jamie Chung, Sondra Currie, Heather Graham, Jeffrey Tambor, and Phillips reprising their roles from the previous two installments joined by Melissa McCarthy and John Goodman. In the film, the "Wolfpack" (Phil, Stu, Doug, and Alan) seek help for Alan after his mental breakdown, only for things to go awry when an incident from the original film comes back to haunt them.

The Hangover Part III was announced days before the release of The Hangover Part II and Mazin, who co-wrote Part II, was brought on board. In January 2012, the principal actors re-signed to star. In March 2012, Warner Bros. Pictures announced a U.S. Memorial Weekend release. The supporting roles were cast between June and September 2012. Principal photography began in September 2012 in Los Angeles, California, before moving to Nogales, Arizona, and Las Vegas, Nevada, concluding that November.

The Hangover Part III premiered at the Westwood Village Theatre, in Los Angeles, on May 20, 2013, and was released theatrically on May 23, 2013, by Warner Bros. Pictures. The film received mixed to negative reviews from critics and grossed $362 million worldwide against its $103 million budget, making it a success but the lowest-grossing film of the trilogy.

== Plot ==
Two years after the events of the previous movie, Leslie Chow escapes from a high-security prison in Thailand during a prison riot. Meanwhile, back in the United States, Alan Garner causes a multi-car freeway pileup after he purchases a giraffe and accidentally decapitates it on a low overpass. Furious about the incident, Alan's father, Sid, gets into an argument with him, which causes him to die of a heart attack. Meanwhile, Alan's brother-in-law Doug Billings informs their friends Phil Wenneck and Stu Price that Alan has been off his ADHD medication for six months and is out of control. The group attends an intervention in which Alan agrees to visit a rehabilitation facility in Arizona and seek treatment as long as the "Wolfpack" take him there.

Phil's minivan is rammed off the road by a rental truck and the Wolfpack is taken hostage. Crime lord Marshall later confronts them. He says that a few weeks after their shenanigans in Las Vegas, Chow hijacked half of a $42 million gold heist, and, seeing how Alan has been the only one to communicate with Chow during his imprisonment, deduced that they could locate him and retrieve the gold. Marshall takes Doug as insurance and gives the others three days to find Chow, or else Doug will be killed. Alan sets up a meeting with Chow in Tijuana, where Stu and Phil hide and attempt to drug him. However, Alan accidentally reveals their location and Chow forces them to confess they are working for Marshall. Chow plans to retrieve the stolen gold from the basement of a Mexican villa he previously owned. They break into the house and retrieve the gold, but Chow double-crosses them by locking them in the basement, resetting the security system, and escaping in Phil's minivan. They are arrested but are mysteriously released from the police station. A limousine picks them up and takes them back to the same villa they helped Chow break into, where they discover that Chow had deceived them: the villa actually belonged to Marshall the entire time, and the gold they stole was the other half that Chow didn't get from Marshall. He spares the group for the oversight but kills his head enforcer, "Black Doug," after failing to stop the four, reminding them of their now two-day deadline.

The trio tracks Phil's phone, which was left in the minivan, and find it left outside a pawn shop in Las Vegas. The owner, Cassie, says that Chow traded a gold brick for only $18,000, far less than its actual $400,000 value and gives them a business card for an escort service Chow is using. Using Stu's former lover Jade as their contact, they learn that Chow is barricaded in the penthouse suite of Caesars Palace. Phil and Alan sneak into his suite from the roof, but Chow escapes, jumping from the balcony and parachuting down to the Strip. Stu catches up to him, locking him in the trunk of Marshall's limousine. The trio take the gold and meet with Marshall, who releases Doug when they reveal they cannot secure the original half as Chow lost it in Bangkok. Although Marshall had promised not to harm Chow, he shoots up the trunk of the car, presumably killing him. However, it was revealed that Alan had given Chow a chance to escape the trunk through a backseat compartment and armed him with a gun. When Marshall finds the trunk empty, Chow emerges from the limo moonroof and kills him and his bodyguard. Chow spares Phil, Stu, and Doug because Alan saved his life. Chow gives Alan a gold bar, but he declines and ends his friendship with Chow due to his bad influence. While retrieving Phil's minivan from the pawnshop, Alan stays behind to date Cassie. Six months later, before his wedding, Alan leaves the Wolfpack, though makes it clear he still wants to hang out with them once in a while.

The Wolfpack, with Cassie in tow, later stage another wild party that they cannot remember. Stu awakens to find himself wearing a lady's thong and breast implants. Alan remembers that the wedding cake was a gift from Chow, who emerges from the bathroom naked, (Note: A bath robe in TV versions.) wielding a katana. His monkey drops from the ceiling onto Stu, startling him.

== Cast ==
- Bradley Cooper as Phil Wenneck, a school teacher and leader of the Wolf Pack
- Ed Helms as Dr. Stu Price, a dentist and member of the Wolf Pack
- Zach Galifianakis as Alan Garner, the erratic man-child member of the Wolf Pack
- Ken Jeong as Leslie Chow, a Chinese gangster the trio met in Vegas
- Jeffrey Tambor as Sid Garner, Alan and Tracy's father
- Heather Graham as Jade, Stu's ex-wife
- Mike Epps as Black Doug, a drug dealer working for Marshall
- Justin Bartha as Doug Billings, Alan's brother-in-law and member of the Wolf Pack
- John Goodman as Marshall, a career drug lord and Chow's nemesis
- Sasha Barrese as Tracy Billings, Alan's sister and Doug's wife
- Jamie Chung as Lauren Price, Stu's wife
- Sondra Currie as Linda Garner, Sid's wife, Alan and Tracy's mother
- Gillian Vigman as Stephanie Wenneck, Phil's wife
- Melissa McCarthy as Cassie, a pawn shop worker whom Alan shows affection for.

Additionally, director Todd Phillips reprises his role from the first film as Mr. Creepy.

== Production ==
In May 2011, days before the release of The Hangover Part II, director Todd Phillips said that "there already are plans for a third film but no script or start date". About the possibility of The Hangover Part III, Phillips stated, "If we were to do a third one, if the audience, if the desire was there, I think we have a very clear idea where that would head. It's certainly not in the same template that you've seen these movies. The third would be very much a finale and an ending. The most I could say about it, what's in my head, and I haven't discussed it with these actors, is that it is not following that template but very much a new idea. As far as where it takes place, I said I'm very open." Also during May, Craig Mazin, who co-wrote The Hangover Part II, entered early talks to write the script for the third installment.

In December 2011, Bradley Cooper appeared on The Graham Norton Show to promote The Hangover Part II DVD and Blu-ray release, where he stated he "hoped" that The Hangover Part III would start shooting in September 2012, and also stated that Todd Phillips was working on the script. In January 2012, it was reported that stars Bradley Cooper, Zach Galifianakis, and Ed Helms were nearing deals to reprise their roles in the third installment with each receiving $15 million (against the backend) for their participation. In February 2012, Mike Tyson stated that he would return in the third film, although he later told TMZ that "I have no idea what's going on. I'm not in this one."

In March 2012, Warner Bros. announced that it was moving forward with the sequel and scheduled a release date of May 24, 2013, again aiming for a Memorial Day opening weekend. In June 2012, it was reported that the third installment would return to Las Vegas and would shoot on the Las Vegas Strip and at Caesars Palace. The report stated that much of the film would also be shot in Los Angeles and Tijuana and include a storyline that involves the guys rescuing Alan from a mental hospital.

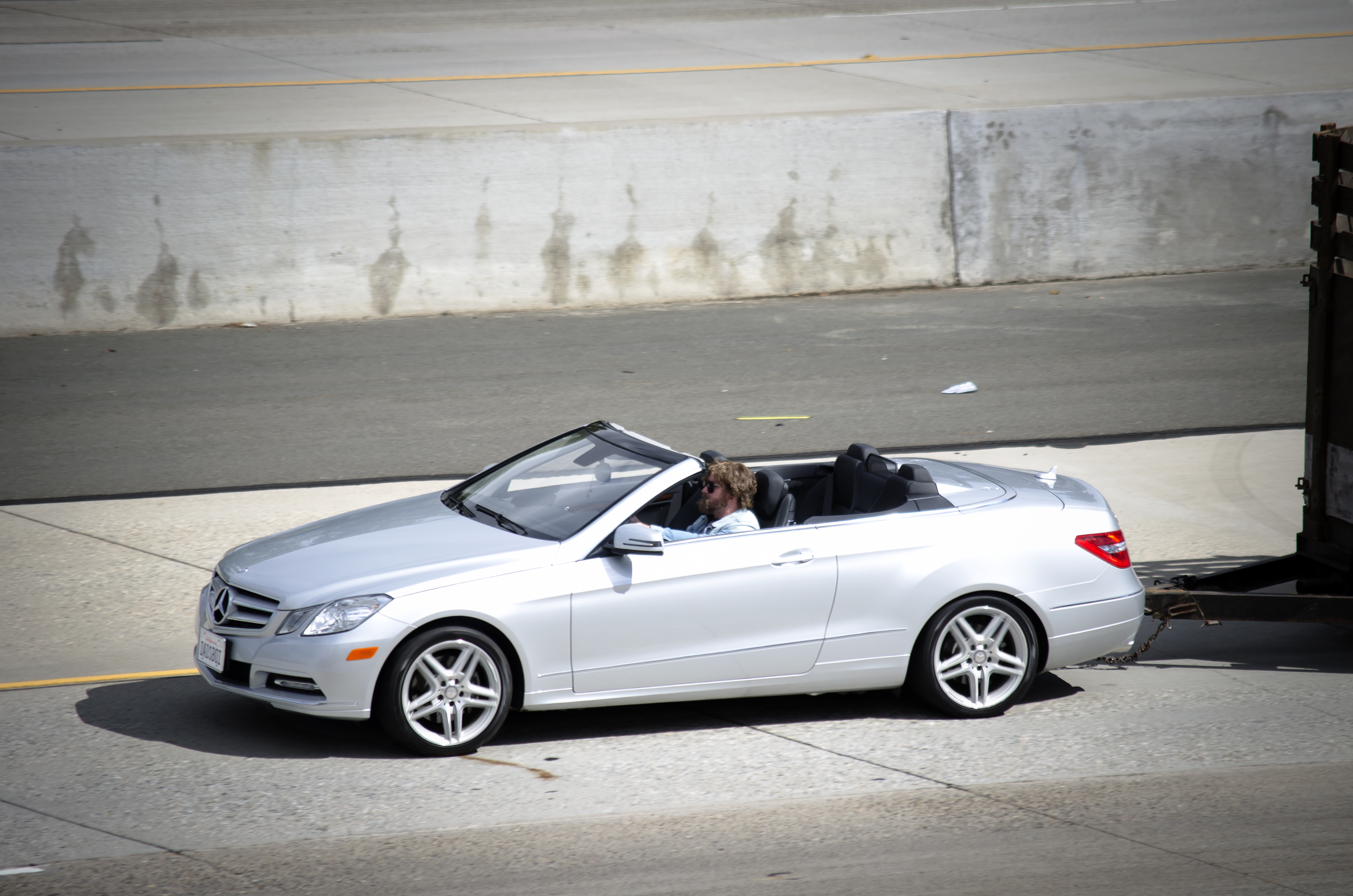
Zach Galifianakis driving the wrong way on California State Route 73 in a Mercedes-Benz E350 during filming in October 2012

In July 2012, Ken Jeong signed on to return in a significantly expanded role. The following week, Mike Epps entered negotiations to reprise his role of Black Doug. In August 2012, it was reported that Heather Graham would be back to play Jade the stripper. A few days later, Sasha Barrese was signed to reprise her role as Doug's wife, Tracy. In August, John Goodman began talks to join the cast in a small role, then described as an antagonist in the same vein as Paul Giamatti's character in Part II. In September 2012, Justin Bartha said he had signed on to return in the sequel.

Principal photography began on September 10, 2012, in Los Angeles. The following week, Melissa McCarthy entered negotiations to join the cast in a small role and Lela Loren was cast as a police officer. On October 8, 2012, production moved to Nogales, Arizona, which doubled as Tijuana in the film. On October 20 and 21, a stretch of California State Route 73, a toll road in Orange County was closed for filming. At the end of the month, production moved to Las Vegas for several weeks of filming. Principal photography concluded in Las Vegas on November 16, 2012.

== Soundtrack ==
The Hangover Part III: Original Motion Picture Soundtrack is the soundtrack of the film. It was released on May 21, 2013.

Track listing

No.	Title	Performer(s)	Length
1.	"MMMBop"	Hanson	4:30
2.	"My Life"	Billy Joel	4:43
3.	"Ave Maria"	Fletcher Sheridan	1:05
4.	"Everybody's Talkin'"	Harry Nilsson	2:50
5.	"Down in Mexico"	The Coasters	3:15
6.	"Hurt"	Ken Jeong	1:22
7.	"Mother ’93"	Danzig	3:24
8.	"Fuckin' Problems"	ASAP Rocky featuring 2 Chainz, Drake & Kendrick Lamar	3:53
9.	"I Believe I Can Fly"	Ken Jeong	0:12
10.	"Fever"	The Cramps	4:16
11.	"N.I.B."	Black Sabbath	6:04
Total length:			39:49

Other songs featured in the film, but not on the soundtrack include "Hurt" by Nine Inch Nails, "The Stranger" by Billy Joel, "N.I.B." by Black Sabbath, "Dark Fantasy" by Kanye West, "In the Air Tonight" by Phil Collins, and "Careless Whisper" by George Michael.

== Release ==
In early May 2013, Warner Bros. moved the release date for The Hangover Part III to Thursday, May 23, a day before Universal Pictures released Fast & Furious 6, in an attempt to beat the Memorial Day weekend rush. The Hangover Part III premiered on Monday, May 20, 2013, at the Westwood Village Theatre in Los Angeles, California.

=== Home media ===
The Hangover Part III was released on DVD and Blu-ray, on October 8, 2013, in the United States and December 2, 2013, in the United Kingdom by Warner Home Video.

== Reception ==
=== Box office ===
The Hangover Part III grossed $112.2 million in North America and $249.8 million in other territories for a total of $362 million, against a budget of $103 million.

The film grossed $3.1 million in late Wednesday night screenings, ahead of its wide release on Thursday, May 23, 2013. It was projected to earn $80 million in its first four days. The film ended up on second place during its opening weekend behind Fast & Furious 6, grossing $53.5 million over its first four days, including $41.7 million, far below the $135 million earned by The Hangover Part II in its opening days.

=== Critical response ===
On Rotten Tomatoes, the film has an approval percentage of 21% based on 202 reviews, with the critics consensus reading: "Less a comedy than an angrily dark action thriller, The Hangover Part III diverges from the series' rote formula but offers nothing compelling in its place." On Metacritic, the film has a score of 30 out of 100 based on 37 critic reviews, meaning "Generally Unfavorable". Audiences polled by CinemaScore gave the film an average grade of "B" on an A+ to F scale.

Describing the film's negative reception, Variety speculated that the series had become critic-proof.

Andrew Barker of Variety gave the film a negative review, writing, "Ditching the hangovers, the backward structure, the fleshed-out characters and any sense of debauchery or fun, this installment instead just thrusts its long-suffering protagonists into a rote chase narrative". Barker seemed to think that it was 'debatable' whether The Hangover Part III should be considered a comedy at all, seeing as it 'more often plays like a loopily plotted, exposition-heavy actioner.' He states: 'That the plot is convoluted and ridiculous isn't really a problem, but by playing things completely chronologically — and worse, soberly — this film's shenanigans feel witlessly arbitrary in a way that the previous installments avoided.'

Stephen Farber of The Hollywood Reporter wrote, "Young viewers looking for unbridled raunch will be sadly disappointed, and so will other moviegoers expecting more than a few wan chuckles." Steven Holden of The New York Times called The Hangover Part III "a dull, lazy walkthrough that along with The Big Wedding has a claim to be the year's worst star-driven movie." Betsy Sharkey of the Los Angeles Times said, "I'm not sure who let the dogs out this time, but they should be made to pay." Richard Roeper of the Chicago Sun-Times wrote, "Director Todd Phillips delivers a film so different from the first two, I'm not even sure it's supposed to be a comedy."

Christy Lemire of the Associated Press gave the film a positive review, writing, "The Hangover Part III runs a different sort of risk by going to darker and more dangerous places than its predecessors, both artistically and emotionally. It dares to alienate the very audience that made The Hangover the highest-grossing R-rated comedy of all time."

=== Accolades ===
At the 40th People's Choice Awards, The Hangover Part III received nominations for Favorite Comedic Movie and Favorite Comedic Movie Actor (Cooper and Galifianakis). Its teaser trailer was nominated for Best Comedy at the 2013 Golden Trailer Awards. The film garnered a nomination for Worst Remake, Rip-off or Sequel at the 34th Golden Raspberry Awards, Sequel or Remake That Shouldn't Have Been Made at the 2013 Alliance of Women Film Journalists Awards, and Hollywood Film Award at the 17th Hollywood Film Awards. Location manager Gregory Alpert won Location Professional of the Year – Features at the 2013 California On Location Awards.

== Future ==
In October 2020, Jeong said in an interview that the cast knew there would not be a fourth film when they finished filming The Hangover Part III and took time to commemorate its closure on the last day. In October 2021, Galifianakis said in an interview that a fourth film could happen if it would be a "Pixar family-friendly version". He then added: "I've written a lot of it, but I just send it to the other guys, and they send me videos of them burning it."

In November 2023, Cooper told The New Yorker Radio Hour that he would be open to reprising his role in a fourth film. "I would do probably Hangover 4 in an instant, yeah, just because I love Todd Phillips, I love Zach Galifianakis, I love Ed Helms so much. I probably would, yeah". Cooper, however, noted that Phillips had no apparent interest in a fourth film, remarking "I don't think Todd's ever going to do that." Later in the same month, Ed Helms expressed interest in a fourth Hangover film. In May 2025, Galifianakis said that he doesn't think there is an audience for a fourth Hangover film and said "I don't think people care".

== See also ==
- List of films set in Las Vegas
