= 21 & Over (film) =

- Theatrical release poster
- Directed by: Jon Lucas; Scott Moore
- Written by: Jon Lucas; Scott Moore
- Produced by: David Hoberman; Ryan Kavanaugh; Todd Lieberman
- Starring: Miles Teller; Skylar Astin; Justin Chon; Sarah Wright
- Cinematography: Terry Stacey
- Edited by: John Refoua
- Music by: Lyle Workman
- Production companies: Relativity Media; Mandeville Films; Virgin Produced
- Distributed by: Relativity Media
- Release date: March 1, 2013
- Running time: 93 minutes
- Country: United States
- Language: English
- Budget: $10–13 million
- Box office: $48.1 million

21 & Over is a 2013 American comedy film written and directed by Jon Lucas and Scott Moore, in their directorial debut. The film stars Justin Chon, Miles Teller, and Skylar Astin, and follows a trio of friends who go out drinking to celebrate one of their 21st birthdays despite having a medical school interview the following morning. The film was released on March 1, 2013, and received generally negative reviews from critics with a gross of $48 million.

== Plot ==
Casey and Miller invite their college friend, Jeff Chang, out to celebrate his 21st birthday. Jeff declines, citing an important medical school interview early the next morning that his domineering doctor father arranged; Jeff finally agrees to having one drink.

At a bar, Jeff accidentally hits a guy with a dart, and the trio flee, interrupting Casey's chat with Jeff's attractive friend, Nicole. Enthused about drinking legally, Jeff over imbibes and passes out. Casey and Miller want to take Jeff home but forget where he lives.

Thinking that Nicole knows Jeff's address, they sneak into what they believe is her sorority house, only to discover it is a Latina one. Upstairs, they encounter two blindfolded pledges undergoing initiation. Miller paddles the girls' buttocks, ordering them to make out. Upon realizing they were tricked, the entire sorority is furious. Casey and Miller escape, first tossing Jeff from an upstairs balcony onto a covered pool. Bouncing off, a drunken Jeff lands in a rose garden still passed out.

The boys locate Nicole at her sorority house across the street. She refers them to her boyfriend, Randy, a yell-leader who was the angry guy from the bar. When he refuses to look up the address in his phone, they steal it while startling a buffalo during the rally, in which mauled Randy. They learn that Jeff no longer lives at that address but a party is in progress there. Searching for somebody who knows Jeff's address, Casey and Miller leave him alone with two stoners. For fun, they strip Jeff, write "Douche Bag" on his forehead and glue a teddy bear to his crotch. He then wanders into the street, causing a commotion. The police apprehend and transfer him to the campus health center.

As Casey and Miller head to the clinic, the vengeful Latina sorority girls abduct them. They find themselves in a ritualistic setting, stripped and shackled to the floor. They are forced to endure what they tricked the two pledge girls into doing. Embarrassed, bruised, and sporting bright-red spanked buttocks, they are released and walk across campus wearing only tube socks over their genitals. Casey blames Miller's immaturity for their predicament, unleashing long-simmering mutual resentment that culminates into a brawl.

At the health center, Casey and Miller discover Jeff is on a 24-hour hold due to a previous suicide attempt. They encounter Nicole. She is there with Randy, who was injured at the pep rally, though she has just broken up with him. Casey and Miller eventually deduce where Jeff lives and smuggle him out of the clinic. Groggy and barely sober, Jeff steals Randy's truck, fleeing with Miller and Casey. Randy and his buddies, and also the police, chase them until the vehicle careens down an embankment, losing the pursuers.

They arrive at Jeff's apartment with barely enough time to prepare him for the interview. Randy arrives, threatening the boys, but Jeff's father shows up and beats Randy. Encouraged by Casey and Miller, Jeff confronts his father, saying he does not want to be a doctor. Dr. Chang berates him until Jeff orders him to leave, surprisingly earning him Randy's respect, who resents his own domineering father. Casey, meanwhile, realizes he has fallen for Nicole and goes after her.

Three months later, Casey, Nicole, Miller, and Jeff are partying at a music festival. Later, Miller, a college dropout who was an intelligent but academically lazy student, applies to Jeff's university. Casey is dating Nicole. Jeff is pursuing music and has a girlfriend.

== Cast ==
- Justin Chon as Jeff Chang
- Miles Teller as Miller
- Skylar Astin as Casey
- Sarah Wright as Nicole
- Francois Chau as Dr. Chang
- Jonathan Keltz as Randy
- Daniel Booko as Julian
- Samantha Futerman as Sally Huang
- Eddy Martin as Eddy
- Dustin Ybarra as PJ Bril
- Russell Hodgkinson as The Chief
- Christiann Castellanos as Pledge Gomez
- Jeremiah Sird as Dr. Cabahug

== Production ==
Jon Lucas and Scott Moore had worked together previously as writers on multiple films, including The Hangover, The Change-Up and Ghosts of Girlfriends Past.

=== Filming ===
Principal photography was scheduled to begin on September 22, 2011, at the University of Washington. Key scenes were filmed in Lewis Hall, the University of Washington Medical Center, University Way NE, locally known as The Ave, the Greek fraternities and sororities on 17th Ave NE, the UW's Husky Stadium area, and the UW's Quad and Red Square. The music festival scene was filmed at The Gorge Amphitheatre, which is located in George, Washington.

Relativity Media has been criticized by civil rights advocates for shooting part of the film in the city of Linyi, Shandong province in China, and choosing to ignore the area's bleak human rights records, notably the treatment suffered by activist lawyer Chen Guangcheng, who was being held under house arrest in a nearby village.

=== Chinese version ===
For the version of the film shown in China, the directors included additional scenes in the beginning and at the end of the film. The Chinese-American lead is changed to a Chinese student who briefly transfers to an American college. According to Jon Lucas, the Chinese version will be about "a boy who leaves China, gets corrupted by our wayward, Western partying ways and goes back to China a better person."

== Reception ==
The film was released on March 1, 2013, opening on 2,771 screens and grossing $8.7 million during its opening weekend. It took in a $45.5 million worldwide total.

=== Critical reaction ===
On Rotten Tomatoes, the film has an approval rating of 26% based on 106 reviews, and an average rating of 4.3/10. The site's critics consensus reads, "Though it strives to mimic The Hangover, 21 and Over is too predictable, too unabashedly profane, and too inconsistently funny to carry the torch." On Metacritic, the film has a weighted average score of 34 out of 100 based on 21 critics, indicating "generally unfavorable" reviews. Audiences polled by CinemaScore gave the film an average grade of "B" on an A+ to F scale.
