= List of 2016 box office number-one films in Venezuela =

This is a list of films which placed number one at the weekend box office for the year 2016.

#	Date	Film	Gross	Notes
1	January 3, 2016	Hotel Transylvania 2	$196,960	Hotel Transylvania 2 reclaimed the #1 spot in its fifteenth weekend of release.
2	January 10, 2016	Star Wars: The Force Awakens	$1,227,978	Star Wars: The Force Awakens reclaimed the #1 spot in its fourth weekend of release.
3	January 17, 2016	Point Break	$2,146,886	Point Break had the highest weekend debut of 2016 before the inflation.
4	January 24, 2016	Point Break	$1,673,720	
5	January 31, 2016	The 5th Wave	$70,238	Starting from this week Venezuela's Box Office suffered an inflation of over 3 points, for so, the box office numbers are lower than the past.
6	February 7, 2016	Point Break	$33,126	
7	February 14, 2016	Daddy's Home	$50,410	Daddy's Home reached the #1 spot in its second weekend of release.
8	February 21, 2016	Zootopia	$142,591	
9	February 28, 2016	Zootopia	$174,500	
10	March 6, 2016	Zootopia	$172,482	
11	March 13, 2016	Zootopia	$50,656	
12	March 20, 2016	Kung Fu Panda 3	$71,722	
13	March 27, 2016	Batman v Superman: Dawn of Justice	$125,468	
14	April 3, 2016	Batman v Superman: Dawn of Justice	$178,742	
15	April 10, 2016	Batman v Superman: Dawn of Justice	$210,146	
16	April 17, 2016	The Jungle Book	$153,714	
17	April 24, 2016	The Jungle Book	$100,483	
18	May 1, 2016	The Jungle Book	$82,146	
19	May 8, 2016	Captain America: Civil War	$578,489	
20	May 15, 2016	Captain America: Civil War	$394,782	
21	May 22, 2016	The Angry Birds Movie	$372,485	
22	May 29, 2016	X-Men: Apocalypse	$419,165	
23	June 5, 2016	Teenage Mutant Ninja Turtles: Out of the Shadows	$516,822	
24	June 12, 2016	The Conjuring 2	$116,852	
25	June 19, 2016	Finding Dory	$240,500	
26	June 26, 2016	Finding Dory	$376,505	
27	July 3, 2016	Finding Dory	$324,539	
28	July 10, 2016	Finding Dory	$225,000	
29	July 17, 2016	Finding Dory	$180,000	
30	July 24, 2016	Finding Dory	$130,976	
31	July 31, 2016	Finding Dory	$70,000	
32	August 7, 2016	The Secret Life of Pets	$148,000	
33	August 14, 2016	Pete's Dragon	$118,652	
34	August 21, 2016	Ben-Hur	$1,127,927	
35	August 28, 2016	Ben-Hur	$332,854	
36	September 4, 2016	Star Trek Beyond	$1,669,317	
37	September 11, 2016	Star Trek Beyond	$831,172	
38	September 18, 2016	Star Trek Beyond	$351,266	
39	September 25, 2016	The BFG	$89,988	
40	October 2, 2016	Deepwater Horizon	$73,728	
41	October 9, 2016	Deepwater Horizon	$51,369	
42	October 16, 2016	Inferno	$53,366	
43	October 23, 2016	Inferno	$37,590	
44	October 30, 2016	Inferno	$28,967	
45	November 6, 2016	Doctor Strange	$276,000	
46	November 13, 2016	Doctor Strange	$202,100	
47	November 20, 2016	Doctor Strange	$159,750	
48	November 27, 2016	Jack Reacher: Never Go Back	$1,878,293	
49	December 4, 2016	Jack Reacher: Never Go Back	$940,685	
50	December 11, 2016	Office Christmas Party	$3,594,391	Office Christmas Party had the highest weekend debut of 2016 after the ongoing inflation.
51	December 18, 2016	Office Christmas Party	$2,769,190	
52	December 25, 2016	Rogue One: A Star Wars Story	$99,495	Rogue One: A Star Wars Story reached the #1 spot in its second weekend of release.

== Highest-grossing films ==
Highest-grossing films of 2016 in Venezuela
Rank	Title	Studio	Domestic Gross
1.	Office Christmas Party	Paramount Pictures	$19,131,685
2.	Captain America: Civil War	Walt Disney Pictures / Marvel Studios	$8,483,874
3.	Teenage Mutant Ninja Turtles: Out of the Shadows	Paramount Pictures / Nickelodeon Movies	$7,306,069
4.	Moana	Walt Disney Pictures	$6,271,997
5.	Jack Reacher: Never Go Back	Paramount Pictures	$5,570,780
6.	Star Trek Beyond	Paramount Pictures	$4,874,184
7.	Point Break	Warner Bros. / Lionsgate	$4,539,227
8.	Finding Dory	Walt Disney Pictures / Pixar Animation Studios	$3,319,862
9.	Ben-Hur	Paramount Pictures / MGM	$2,533,605
10.	Doctor Strange	Walt Disney Pictures / Marvel Studios	$1,680,938

== See also ==
- List of American films — American films by year
