= Four Christmases =

2008 American Christmas comedy drama film

- Theatrical release poster
- Directed by: Seth Gordon
- Screenplay by: Matt R. Allen; Caleb Wilson; Jon Lucas; Scott Moore
- Story by: Matt R. Allen; Caleb Wilson
- Produced by: Gary Barber; Jonathan Glickman; Roger Birnbaum
- Starring: Vince Vaughn; Reese Witherspoon; Robert Duvall; Jon Favreau; Katy Mixon; Mary Steenburgen; Dwight Yoakam; Tim McGraw; Kristin Chenoweth; Jon Voight; Sissy Spacek
- Cinematography: Jeffrey L. Kimball
- Edited by: Mark Helfrich; Melissa Kent
- Music by: Alex Wurman
- Production companies: New Line Cinema; Spyglass Entertainment; Wild West Picture Show Productions; Type A Films
- Distributed by: Warner Bros. Pictures
- Release date: November 26, 2008
- Running time: 89 minutes
- Country: United States
- Language: English
- Budget: $80 million
- Box office: $163.7 million

Four Christmases is a 2008 American Christmas comedy-drama film starring Vince Vaughn and Reese Witherspoon with Robert Duvall, Jon Favreau, Mary Steenburgen, Dwight Yoakam, Tim McGraw, Kristin Chenoweth, Jon Voight, and Sissy Spacek in supporting roles. The film is director Seth Gordon's first studio feature film.

The plot surrounds the couple Brad McVie and Kate Kinkaid who must, when their vacation plans get canceled due to dense fog, travel to four different family Christmas parties.

The film was produced by New Line Cinema and Spyglass Entertainment and released by Warner Bros. Pictures on November 26, 2008. It received generally negative reviews from critics but earned $163 million worldwide.

== Plot ==
Brad McVie and Kate Kinkaid are a happily unmarried couple living in San Francisco. Three years into their relationship, they remain uninterested in marriage or children, preferring to role-play as strangers, take dance lessons for the fun of it, and avoid their dysfunctional families during the holiday by traveling abroad "for charity work".

At Christmas, Brad and Kate plan a relaxing vacation in Fiji, but heavy fog grounds the entire airport. They are unexpectedly interviewed by a television news crew, notifying their families that their holiday plans are now canceled, and forcing them to visit all four of their divorced parents in one day.

They make their first reluctant trip to see Brad's father Howard, where Brad is beaten up by his amateur cage-fighter brothers Denver and Dallas, and Kate is surprised to learn that Brad's real name is Orlando. Brad's expensive gifts for the family lead to more tension, while his out-of-control nephews and pregnant sister-in-law Susan leave Kate uncertain whether she does want children. The disastrous visit ends after Brad falls off the roof trying to install a satellite dish.

Brad and Kate arrive at her mother Marilyn's house, where Brad meets several generations of her flirtatious female relatives like Kate's sister Courtney. While he is shown embarrassing scrapbooks of Kate's childhood, Kate takes a pregnancy test on a whim. Her niece steals the test, forcing Kate to retrieve it from a mob of children inside an inflatable castle, but the test is negative. At a church service led by Marilyn's boyfriend Pastor Phil, Brad gets carried away and humiliates Kate when they are forced to play Mary and Joseph in the Christmas pageant.

The couple then visits Brad's mother Paula, whose boyfriend Darryl is his childhood best friend, much to Brad's discomfort. A game of Taboo with Paula, Darryl, Denver, and Susan further strains Brad and Kate's relationship, leading to an argument in the car about their future together. Kate tries to start a conversation about the negative pregnancy test, but Brad remains adamant that he does not want children.

Realizing that she wants a deeper commitment, Kate enters her father Creighton's house alone as Brad drives away. Her father encourages her to value her time with family and to embrace honesty, while Brad drives back to see his own father, realizing his fear of ending up similarly bitter and alone. Making up his mind as he revisits his childhood bedroom, Brad reunites with Kate, committing himself to her.

On New Year's Day a year later, Brad and Kate welcome their first child after keeping the pregnancy secret. As theirs is the first baby of the New Year, a news crew arrives to congratulate them — once again revealing the news to their families.

== Cast ==
- Vince Vaughn as Brad McVie, a man who was formerly known as Orlando McVie
- Reese Witherspoon as Kate Kinkaid, Brad's girlfriend
- Robert Duvall as Howard McVie, Brad's father
- Jon Favreau as Denver McVie, Brad's oldest brother
- Mary Steenburgen as Marilyn Kinkaid, Kate's mother
- Dwight Yoakam as Pastor Phil, Marilyn's pastor and boyfriend
- Tim McGraw as Dallas McVie, Brad's older brother
- Kristin Chenoweth as Courtney Kinkaid Cootie, Kate's older sister
- Jon Voight as Creighton Kinkaid, Kate's father who was divorced several times and still maintains contact with Marilyn
- Sissy Spacek as Paula McVie, Brad's mother
- Katy Mixon as Susan McVie, Denver's wife and Brad's sister-in-law
- Colleen Camp as Aunt Donna, Marilyn's younger sister and Kate's maternal aunt
- Carol Kane as Aunt Sarah, Marilyn's older sister and Kate's maternal aunt
- Jeanette Miller as Gram-Gram, Marilyn's mother and Kate's maternal grandmother
- Jack Donner as Kate's Grandpa
- Steve Wiebe as Jim Cootie, Courtney's husband and Kate's brother-in-law
- Patrick Van Horn as Darryl, Brad's old friend who is now Paula's younger boyfriend
- Marissa Tejada Benekos as a news reporter who interviews Brad and Kate
- Laura Johnson as Cheryl, Creighton's girlfriend
- Brian Baumgartner as Eric, Brad's co-worker
- Cedric Yarbrough as Stan, Brad's co-worker
- Skyler Gisondo as Connor McVie, Dallas's son and Brad's and Denver's nephew
- Zak Boggan as Cody McVie, Dallas's son and Brad's and Denver's nephew
- Haley Hallak as Baby Clementine, Denver & Susan's daughter, Brad's and Dallas' niece, Howard's granddaughter and Connor and Cody's cousin
- True Bella Pinci as Kasi Cootie, Courtney & Jim's daughter and Kate's niece
- Sterling Beaumon, Ty Brown, Ryder Bucaro, Callie Croughwell, Taylor Geare, Zachary Gordon, Reef Graham, Zai Moore, Destiny Petty, Diamond Petty, Bryce Robinson, Kort Rogers, Mackenzie Brooke Smith, Ava Rose Williams, and Haidyn Winther as the kids in the Jump-Jump
- Creagen Dow as Sheep
- Noah Munck and Matthew Glen Johnson as the screaming kids
- Daniel Hagen, Vernon Vaughn, Sharon Vaughn, Ronald D. Brown, Jimmy Gonzales, Constance Maris, and Didi Tossapon Banks as the church-goers.

One of the film's executive producers, Peter Billingsley has a credited role as an airline ticket agent.

== Production ==
Prior to Vince Vaughn and Reese Witherspoon's casting, it was announced that Spyglass Entertainment had set Adam Shankman to direct for Columbia Pictures. Howard Gould was brought in to provide rewrites.

Seth Gordon was brought in as director at the insistence of Vaughn, who had seen Gordon's documentary The King of Kong: A Fistful of Quarters, a film, Gordon points out, which, like Four Christmases, has a "traditional three-act structure".

The film began production in December 2007, during the 2007–2008 Writers Guild of America strike, which meant that no changes could be made to the script. During production, New Line Cinema became a "unit of Warner Bros.", which put the film's completion at risk.

== Reception ==
On Rotten Tomatoes, Four Christmases has an approval rating of 25% based on 145 reviews and an average rating of 4.3/10. The website's critical consensus reads, "Despite a strong cast, this sour holiday comedy suffers from a hackneyed script." At Metacritic, which assigns a normalized rating to reviews, the film has a score of 41 out of 100, based on 27 critics, indicating "mixed or average" reviews. Audiences polled by CinemaScore gave the film an average grade of "B" on an A+ to F scale.

The Hollywood Reporter called the film "one of the most joyless Christmas movies ever" with "an unearned feel-good ending [that] adds insult to injury"; it criticized the film's script for "situat[ing] Hollywood clichés about Southern rednecks incongruously within the tony Bay Area". Variety magazine called it an "oddly misanthropic, occasionally amusing but thoroughly cheerless holiday attraction that is in no way a family film". The Associated Press said the film "began with some promise" then segued into "noisy joylessness [that] sets the tone for the whole movie"; the review noted that "Vaughn makes the movie tolerable here and there, but this kind of slapsticky physical comedy doesn't suit Witherspoon at all." Frank Lovece of Film Journal International found "no core to their characters. They just embody whatever plot machination the movie needs at any given moment", and that, "Every predictable Christmas-comedy trope gets dragged out like the string of electric lights that is pulled from the wall to whipsaw through the living room". Roger Ebert gave the film two stars out of four, and wrote his review in the style of a pitch session between a filmmaker and his boss, whereby he derided the film's alleged lack of humour or narrative sense.

=== Box office ===
On its opening day, a Wednesday, it ranked second at the box office with $6.1 million, behind the previous week's new release blockbuster Twilight. It then went on to take the top spot each successive day from Thursday to Sunday, earning $46.1 million and ranking #1 over the entire extended Thanksgiving holiday weekend. In its second weekend, Four Christmases held on to the #1 spot, taking in another $18.1 million.

The film grossed $120.1 million in the U.S. and $43.6 million in foreign countries, for a worldwide gross of $163.7 million.

== Home media ==
The DVD and Blu-ray Disc were released on November 24, 2009.

== Soundtrack ==
Four Christmases: Music from the Motion Picture

Soundtrack album by Various artists
- Released: November 25, 2008
- Length: 32:35
- Labels: New Line (Digital); Watertower Music (Audio)

Four Christmases: Music from the Motion Picture was originally available to download from Amazon (MP3) or iTunes (MPEG-4), along with a digital booklet in portable document format which summarizes the credits of the album along with screenshots and other promotional images of the film. It was released on November 25, 2008, by New Line Records. The compact disc format was released on October 6, 2009, by Watertower Music.

Track listing

1. "Baby It's Cold Outside" by Dean Martin & Martina McBride – 2:55
2. "(There's No Place Like) Home for the Holidays" by Perry Como – 2:51
3. "Sleigh Ride" by Ferrante & Teicher – 2:16
4. "Christmas All Over Again" by Tom Petty – 4:15
5. "Season's Greetings" by Robbers On High Street – 2:23
6. "Jingle Bell Rock" by Bobby Helms with The Anita Kerr Singers – 2:11
7. "The Christmas Song" by Gavin DeGraw – 3:24
8. "Cool Yule" by Louis Armstrong – 2:55
9. "I'll Be Home for Christmas" by Dean Martin – 2:33
10. "White Christmas" by Bing Crosby – 2:59
11. "O Little Town of Bethlehem" by Sarah McLachlan – 3:53

== See also ==
- List of Christmas films
