= Flypaper (2011 film) =

2011 film by Rob Minkoff

- Theatrical release poster
- Directed by: Rob Minkoff
- Written by: Jon Lucas; Scott Moore
- Produced by: Mark Damon; Peter Safran; Patrick Dempsey
- Starring: Patrick Dempsey; Ashley Judd; Tim Blake Nelson; Mekhi Phifer; Matt Ryan; Jeffrey Tambor; John Ventimiglia; Pruitt Taylor Vince; Curtis Armstrong
- Cinematography: Steven Poster
- Edited by: Tom Finan
- Music by: John Swihart
- Production companies: Foresight Unlimited; The Safran Company
- Distributed by: IFC Films
- Release dates: January 28, 2011 (Sundance); August 19, 2011 (United States)
- Running time: 88 minutes
- Country: United States
- Language: English
- Budget: $8 million
- Box office: $1.2 million

Flypaper is a 2011 American crime comedy film directed by Rob Minkoff, written by Jon Lucas and Scott Moore, and distributed by IFC Films. Starring Patrick Dempsey and Ashley Judd, the film centers around two groups of criminals that stick up the same bank at the same time, holding all of the employees and bystanders hostage. One of the hostages (Dempsey) escapes captivity and attempts to deduce the unusual double-robbery, waggishly courting the affection of a bank teller (Judd) in the process. Dempsey also produced the film alongside Mark Damon and Peter Safran via the latter's The Safran Company

Lucas and Moore had previously written The Hangover (2009), and met Minkoff in the months leading up to that film's release. Minkoff, best known for co-directing The Lion King (1994), expressed a desire to work with them, and agreed to head Flypaper when he learned they had written the script, which he described as "terrific." Filming took place in Baton Rouge, Louisiana from June to September 2010.

Flypaper premiered at the Sundance Film Festival on January 28, 2011, and had a limited theatrical release on August 19 of the same year. It received generally mixed or negative reviews, with praise going to Tim Blake Nelson and Pruitt Taylor Vince for their performances, while Minkoff's direction and Dempsey's performance garnered more divided responses.

== Plot ==
As Credit International bank teller Kaitlin Nest prepares to end her shift, a customer, Tripp Kennedy, approaches her and requests to have a $100 bill broken up into a specific configuration of coins. As he flirts with her, the bank is simultaneously stuck up by two groups of criminals; three high-tech professionals - Darrien, Weinstein and Gates - and two unmasked rednecks - "Peanut Butter" and "Jelly." While the trio wants to rob the vault, the duo simply wants the ATMs. A bystander named Jack Hayes is fatally shot and a crossfire gunfight is initiated. Tripp throws himself in the middle of the commotion and convinces the criminals to rob the bank concurrently. The trio locks Tripp, Kaitlin and a group of hostages in an upstairs kitchen while Peanut Butter and Jelly attempt unsuccessfully to break open the ATMs with a series of weapons-grade plastic explosives. Tripp promptly escapes from the kitchen through the ceiling and ventures into the bank to deduce who killed Hayes.

The trio is repeatedly stymied in their efforts to break into the vault through a series of mishaps that exposes their identities to the hostages. When Tripp infiltrates the trio's workspace to inquire about Hayes' murder, Weinstein reveals that the bank's security system was deactivated and rebooted just prior to the criminals' arrival. Tripp is returned to the upstairs office where he pesters the bank's computer technician Mitchell Wolf into admitting that he sold intel about the security reboot to the criminals. During a bathroom break, Mitch has a panic attack and stress vomits, prompting Weinstein to retrieve medicine for him. Meanwhile, Gates fraternizes with Peanut Butter and Jelly as they compare the criminal groups' rankings among the FBI's most wanted bank robbers, including the #1 most wanted fugitive, Vicellous Drum.

Peanut Butter and Jelly ask for the hostages' help with detonating their explosives. Tripp volunteers so that he can search Hayes for clues. Tripp discovers that Hayes was an undercover agent carrying an FBI-issue gun, brandishing the firearm and drawing the attention of the criminals. When Tripp deduces that Weinstein must have killed Hayes, he, Darrien and Gates go searching for Weinstein, only to find he and Mitch both armed and fatally wounded by gunshot. As Gates and Tripp ponder how both men could have drawn and killed each other at the same time, Darrien decides to flee the bank. When he can't find the key to the trio's escape mechanism, he uses a blowtorch, but the blowtorch is rigged and he is killed in an explosion. Tripp finds the clicker Darrien was looking for in Weinstein's mouth, further suggesting that Weinstein had turned on his co-conspirators.

An exasperated Gates teams up with Peanut Butter and Jelly and plots to use their unconventional explosives in a last ditch effort to break into the vault. Tripp escapes captivity again and convinces Jelly to reveal that Vicellous Drum is the duo's point man who summoned them to the bank via a fax. Tripp pilfers Jelly's gun and barters the previously missing clicker for a similar fax that Gates and the trio received, also from Vicellous Drum. Tripp deduces that Drum summoned all of the criminals to the bank concurrently for the purpose of eliminating them all. This revelation is compounded when one of the hostages, a Swiss bank representative, is found dead in a cupboard, also in possession of a fax from Drum.

Tripp tries to convince Gates that the robbery is in fact an organized ambush and that Drum is in the bank. Ignoring him, Gates detonates the duo's explosives and finally breaches the vault. As the remaining criminals load their take into duffel bags and the hostages look on, the bank's security guard Mr. Clean arms himself in a fit of paranoia and urges the others to stay away from him. Tripp and Kaitlin devise a plan to cut the lights in the bank so that Drum will go searching for a pair of night-vision goggles that Tripp had previously discovered in the bathroom. This ploy reveals that Mr. Blythe, Kaitlin's hypoglycemic bank manager, is in fact Vicellous Drum. Drum kills Mr. Clean and Gates before cornering and striking Tripp in the bathroom. When Drum's identity is uncovered, he attempts to bribe the remaining hostages with money, but they fatally shoot him. Peanut Butter and Jelly gleefully take all of the money that the trio had originally wanted from the vault and flee for Cancún.

The following morning, Tripp receives medicine from an ambulance while Rex, a loan officer, talks to the press about the robbery and Madge, a bank teller, convenes with bank management about compensation for the night's misfortune. A group of police officers help Kaitlin load what appear to be wedding gifts into her car. Tripp follows Kaitlin into her car and opens her gifts, revealing large sums of money encased by currency straps and that Kaitlin herself is a bank robber. Admitting to being in love with her, Tripp persuades Kaitlin into forming a bank-robbing duo of their own, but devoid of murder or bloodshed. Kaitlin reveals that she is Alexis Black, the FBI's #3 most wanted bank-robbing fugitive and the two drive off together.

== Cast ==
- Patrick Dempsey as Tripp Kennedy
- Ashley Judd as Kaitlin Nest
- Tim Blake Nelson as Billy Ray 'Peanut Butter' McCloud
- Mekhi Phifer as Darrien
- Matt Ryan as Rupert Gates
- Jeffrey Tambor as Gordon Blythe/Vicellous Drum
- John Ventimiglia as Weinstein
- Pruitt Taylor Vince as Wyatt 'Jelly' Jenkins
- Curtis Armstrong as Mitchell Wolf
- Rob Huebel as Rex Newbauer
- Adrian Martinez as Mr. Clean
- Natalia Safran as 'Swiss Miss'
- Octavia Spencer as Madge Wiggins
- Eddie Matthews as Jack Hayes
- Rob Boltin as Credit Manager

== Production ==
Lucas and Moore had previously co-written the successful comedy The Hangover (2009). Minkoff, whose best known film credits include co-directing Disney's The Lion King (1994) and directing Columbia's Stuart Little (1999) and Stuart Little 2 (2002), met the pair in early 2009, prior to the release of The Hangover. The three discussed ideas for collaborating on a project together in the future. A short time later, Damon and Safran approached Minkoff with the script for Flypaper, insisting he read it. Upon learning that Lucas and Moore had written it, he immediately became attached to the film's development. Dempsey, who also co-produced the film, had already been cast in the lead role when Minkoff entered the fold. Nelson was, per Minkoff's recollection, the second main actor to join the cast. Shooting began in Baton Rouge, Louisiana in June 2010, with filming shutting down parts of the city's downtown for two days. Principal photography concluded in September of that same year.

Paul McGuigan was originally attached to direct before Minkoff was hired. Jessica Biel and Liv Tyler were considered for the lead female role that eventually went to Judd, with Biel even initially being cast during pre-production before withdrawing from the project.

The opening animatic sequence was created by Geefwee Boedoe. Boedoe, best known for the main title design on Pixar's Monsters, Inc. (2001), had been planning to fully animate the sequence, but was unable to due to the film's budget constraints. Production approved of the piece in its rudimentary condition, even though Boedoe insisted it was not a finished product, so it was included as is in the film's opening. Boedoe uploaded the animatic to his YouTube channel in 2025, further explaining in the description that, "This was intended as a rough animatic, but the production ran out of time and money and used it as is."

== Release ==
=== Theatrical ===
Flypaper initially premiered at the Sundance Film Festival on January 28, 2011, and had a brief theatrical run beginning on August 19, 2011.

=== Home media ===
Flypaper was released on DVD and Blu-ray in the United States on November 15, 2011.

== Reception ==
=== Box office ===
Flypaper grossed just $1.2 million against its $8 million budget in a limited theatrical release.

=== Critical response ===
Flypaper received mixed-to-negative reviews. Justin Lowe of The Hollywood Reporter enjoyed some aspects of the film, stating: "Minkoff smoothly choreographs the rapid-fire action sequences and adeptly integrates the movie’s intersecting plotlines, although directing the sprawling cast comes off less effectively." While mentioning the plot twists' "improbability" and comparing the film unfavorably to Clue (1985), he went on to say that, "Production values overall are top-quality, with cinematographer Steven Poster providing crisp visuals and Tom Finan’s editing ably underpinning the film’s frantic pace." He praised Dempsey's performance, stating that he embodied "nerdiness and charm", while also highlighting Nelson and Vince as Peanut Butter and Jelly, asserting they "consistently deliver with their absurdly incompetent routine." In a more negative review, Una LaMarche of The New York Observer gave the film a score of 0 out of 4, stating: "You know there’s something wrong with a comedy when you’d rather see the main characters killed off than live happily ever after." She said that Minkoff was "out of his depth" as director and criticized Dempsey's "manic" portrayal of Tripp, while also noting the broader group of hostages' lack of supervision, unfavorably comparing them to the cast of The Breakfast Club (1985).

Rachel Saltz of The New York Times also had a mixed response to the film, conferring praise to the performances of the criminals, saying that Nelson and Vince "wring some funny moments and even a bit of sweetness out of their Deliverance-reject characters." She went on to suggest the film is "trying too hard," stating: "Full of indie mannerisms — compulsive swearing, jokey violence, quirk-laden characters — Flypaper can’t quite manage to find a style or a comic groove of its own." Sara Stewart of the New York Post called the film "aimless" and "unremarkable", while Elizabeth Weitzman of the New York Daily News was more complimentary, saying: "There are some solid laughs, and the evident goal isn’t to pull off a great plan but to kick up some lighthearted amusement. In that regard, mission accomplished."

On Rotten Tomatoes, the film has an approval rating of 15% based on reviews from 20 critics. Metacritic, which uses a weighted average, assigned the film a score of 37 out of 100, based on 10 critics, indicating "generally unfavorable" reviews.
