= Bad Moms =

2016 film by Scott Moore and Jon Lucas

- Theatrical release poster
- Directed by: Jon Lucas; Scott Moore
- Written by: Jon Lucas; Scott Moore
- Produced by: Bill Block; Suzanne Todd
- Starring: Mila Kunis; Kristen Bell; Kathryn Hahn; Jay Hernandez; Jada Pinkett Smith; Christina Applegate
- Cinematography: Jim Denault
- Edited by: Emma E. Hickox; James Thomas
- Music by: Christopher Lennertz
- Production companies: H. Brothers; Bill Block Media; Suzanne Todd Productions
- Distributed by: STX Entertainment
- Release dates: July 19, 2016 (New York City); July 29, 2016 (United States)
- Running time: 101 minutes
- Countries: China; United States
- Language: English
- Budget: $22 million
- Box office: $183.9 million

Bad Moms is a 2016 comedy film directed and written by Jon Lucas and Scott Moore. The film stars an ensemble cast that includes Mila Kunis, Kristen Bell, Kathryn Hahn, Jay Hernandez, Annie Mumolo, Jada Pinkett Smith, and Christina Applegate.

Principal photography began in January 2016 in New Orleans and finished in March. The film premiered on July 19, 2016, in New York City and was theatrically released on July 29, 2016, by STX Entertainment. It received mixed reviews from critics and grossed over $183 million worldwide, the first film from STX to gross $100 million domestically. A sequel, A Bad Moms Christmas, was released on November 1, 2017.

== Plot ==
Amy Mitchell is a 32-year-old woman living in the Chicago suburbs with her kids, Jane and Dylan; her husband, Mike; and their dog, Roscoe. She works as a sales rep for a coffee company, prepares healthful lunches for her children, does their homework for them, goes to all of their extracurricular activities, and is active in the school’s PTA, which is run by the domineering Gwendolyn James and her cronies, Stacy and Vicky.

When Amy catches Mike cheating on her with a camgirl, she kicks him out and attempts to keep everything together. After a particularly stressful day, Amy publicly quits the PTA because of Gwendolyn's overzealous bake sale. At a nearby bar, she meets Carla Dunkler, a laid-back, sexually-active single mom of one son, Jaxon, and Kiki Moore, a stay-at-home mom of four who admires Amy's dissent. Amy and Carla are irritated to see that Kiki's husband is domineering since he expects her to take care of all of the kids and the house without any help, and Amy and Kiki are taken aback by Carla's very hands-off approach to parenting.

The three embark on an all-night bender, which inspires Amy to loosen up with her kids. Amy wants to start dating again but is inexperienced, as she had a shotgun marriage at 20. She ultimately strikes up a conversation with Jessie Harkness, a kind and handsome widowed father who has a crush on her, which leads to the two of them kissing.

When Amy brings store-bought donut holes to the bake sale, she draws the ire of Gwendolyn, who uses her PTA authority to get Jane benched from the soccer team. Angered, Amy decides to run for PTA president against her. A meet-and-greet at Amy's draws only one visitor, who tells them that Gwendolyn has launched a rival party at her own house that is catered by Martha Stewart. The other moms and Martha swiftly abandon Gwendolyn's party when it becomes clear that she intends to lecture them all evening, which leads to a successful party at Amy's house. After the party, Jessie shows up after Carla used Amy's phone to booty-text him, which leads to him and Amy having sex.

Gwendolyn responds to Amy’s antics by putting joints in Jane's locker, framing Jane, and getting her kicked out of the soccer team. Jane becomes upset with Amy for her selfishness and goes to stay with Mike, who has agreed to an amicable divorce, along with Dylan and Roscoe. To make matters worse, Amy‘s boss, Dale Kipler, fires her for taking too much time off.

A despondent Amy stays home during the PTA election, but is fired up by Carla and Kiki. At the election event, Amy gives an inspiring speech about how overworked moms need to take time off, to do fewer and less stressful events, and most importantly, allow themselves to make mistakes. She wins by a landslide and winds up comforting a devastated Gwendolyn, who reveals that her life is not as perfect as she claimed it to be.

Weeks later, Amy reconciles with her kids. Her approach has also led to positive changes: Jane has been reinstated to the soccer team and stresses out less, Dylan applies himself, Kiki makes her husband help out with the kids, Carla is more responsible and hands-on, Gwendolyn is kinder with everyone else, and all of the other moms feel more energized. Amy gets her job back with much better compensation after Dale sees how much he took her for granted, and she continues to see Jessie. Gwendolyn invites Amy, Carla, and Kiki for a day of fun on her husband's private jet.

The end credits feature the cast of the film being interviewed with their real-life mothers.

== Cast ==
- Mila Kunis as Amy Redmond-Mitchell
- Kristen Bell as Kiki Moore
- Kathryn Hahn as Carla Dunkler
- Christina Applegate as Gwendolyn James
- Jada Pinkett Smith as Stacy
- Annie Mumolo as Vicky
- Jay Hernandez as Jessie Harkness
- Oona Laurence as Jane Mitchell, Amy's daughter and Dylan's older sister
- Emjay Anthony as Dylan Mitchell, Amy's son and Jane's younger brother
- David Walton as Mike
- Clark Duke as Dale Kipler
- Wanda Sykes as Dr. Karl
- Wendell Pierce as Principal Burr
- J. J. Watt as Coach Craig
- Megan Ferguson as Tessa
- Lyle Brocato as Kent
- Cade Cooksey as Jaxon Dunkler, Carla's son
- Martha Stewart as herself
- Eugenia Kuzmina as Russian Mom
- Lilly Singh as Cathy

== Production ==
On April 30, 2015, it was announced that Jon Lucas and Scott Moore were set to direct an untitled female-led comedy, based on their own original script. Bill Block of Block Entertainment and Raj Brinder Singh of Merced Media Partners would produce the film, along with Judd Apatow and Josh Church through Apatow Productions, while Merced Media financing the film. Leslie Mann was set to star in the lead role. This was Bill Block's first film produced through Block Entertainment after leaving QED International. Paramount Pictures acquired the film's distribution rights on May 8, 2015. The film was sold to different international distributors at the 2015 Cannes Film Festival. On June 1, 2015, Mann and Apatow exited the film because of scheduling conflicts.

On October 26, 2015, it was reported that Paramount had left the project, with STX Entertainment coming on board to handle the American distribution. Mila Kunis, Christina Applegate, and Kristen Bell joined the film, starring in its lead roles, while Suzanne Todd produced the film along with Block. On January 11, 2016, Jada Pinkett Smith and Kathryn Hahn joined the film, with Smith playing Applegate's blunt best friend, and Hahn also playing a mother. It was later revealed that Oona Laurence had also joined the cast.

=== Filming ===
Principal photography on the film began on January 11, 2016, in New Orleans and concluded on March 1, 2016.

== Release ==
In May 2015, Paramount set the film's release date for April 15, 2016, but later, in July 2015, the studio moved the film out to a new unspecified release date. STX Entertainment later bought the distribution rights to the film, which was scheduled for August 19, 2016, before it was eventually released on July 29, 2016, with release dates swapped with The Space Between Us.

Bad Moms grossed $113.2 million in the United States and Canada and $70.7 million in other territories for a worldwide total of $183.9 million, against a budget of $20 million. It was released there on July 29, 2016, alongside Jason Bourne and Nerve, and was projected to gross around $25 million in its opening weekend from 3,215 theaters. The film grossed $2.1 million from Thursday night previews and in its opening weekend, the film grossed $23.8 million and finished third at the box office. On September 3, the film crossed $100 million domestically and became STX Entertainment's first film to do so. Deadline Hollywood calculated the net profit of the film to be $50.8 million, when factoring together all expenses and revenues.

=== Home media ===
Bad Moms was released on DVD and Blu-ray on November 1, 2016, by Universal Studios Home Entertainment.

== Reception ==
Bad Moms received mixed reviews. On Rotten Tomatoes the film has an approval rating of 59% based on 172 reviews with an average rating of 5.60/10. The site's critical consensus reads, "Bad Moms boasts a terrific cast and a welcome twist on domestic comedy – and they're often enough to compensate for the movie's unfortunate inability to take full advantage of its assets." On Metacritic, the film has a score of 60 out of 100 based on 34 critics, indicating "mixed or average" reviews. Audiences polled by CinemaScore gave the film an average grade of "A" on an A+ to F scale.

IGN gave the film 7/10, saying, "[t]he uneven Bad Moms is an entry in the slobs versus snobs genre that never quite realizes its full comedic potential." Chris Nashawaty of Entertainment Weekly gave it an A−, writing: "beneath all of its hard-R partying, rebellious debauchery, and profanity, it taps into something very real and insidious in the zeitgeist. It's one of the funniest movies of the year—and one of the most necessary." Peter Travers of Rolling Stone gave it 2½ stars out of 4, with Travers saying: "the movie cops out by going soft in the end, but it's still hardcore hilarity for stressed moms looking for a girls night out".

The A.V. Club's Jesse Hassenger opined that Bad Moms "sells its characters' struggle short by shuffling their kids off screen whenever it's convenient, and not even in the name of comical neglect; there always seems to be time and money to get a sitter. ... [This] at times turns the movie into a referendum on unhelpful husbands of well-off moms, rather than the absurdities of Perfect Mom culture." Lindsey Bahr of the Associated Press wrote, "Bad Moms had so many opportunities to be great, edgy and insightful, but instead settles for the most milquetoast commentary possible on modern motherhood."

=== Accolades ===
For the 43rd People's Choice Awards, held on January 18, 2017, the film achieved accolades by winning the Favorite Comedy Movie and also garnered a nomination for Kristen Bell for Favorite Comedic Movie Actress.

== Sequel and cancelled films ==
=== Bad Dads ===
In October 2016, STX Entertainment announced a spin-off film, Bad Dads, and set a release date for July 14, 2017. However, by December 2020, the film seems to have been delayed, with a new release date not set. In addition, it has been delisted from Box Office Mojo.

=== Bad Moms' Moms ===
In April 2019, it was announced that Susan Sarandon, Christine Baranski, and Cheryl Hines had signed up to appear in a sequel to A Bad Moms Christmas titled Bad Moms' Moms. As of 2025, there have been no updates or further information about the film, and it is likely that it was silently cancelled.

== Adaptations ==
In February 2018, it was reported that Fox was developing an unscripted reality TV series that would take the films' premise of imperfect parents and shift the focus to real-life moms. The series was to be co-produced by Fox Alternative Entertainment and STX Television.

Bad Moms: The Novel was published in 2020. It was written by Nora McInerny based on the film.
