= Jexi =

2019 American romantic comedy film

- Theatrical release poster
- Directed by: Jon Lucas; Scott Moore
- Written by: Jon Lucas; Scott Moore
- Produced by: Suzanne Todd
- Starring: Adam DeVine; Alexandra Shipp; Ron Funches; Lo Mutuc (Note: Credited as Charlyne Yi); Wanda Sykes; Justin Hartley; Michael Peña; Rose Byrne
- Cinematography: Ben Kutchins
- Edited by: James Thomas
- Music by: Christopher Lennertz; Philip White
- Production companies: CBS Films; Entertainment One; Suzanne Todd Productions
- Distributed by: Lionsgate
- Release date: October 11, 2019 (United States)
- Running time: 84 minutes
- Countries: United States; Canada
- Language: English
- Budget: $5–12 million
- Box office: $10.6 million

Jexi is a 2019 comedy film written and directed by Jon Lucas and Scott Moore, starring Adam DeVine, Alexandra Shipp, Michael Peña, Rose Byrne, Justin Hartley, Wanda Sykes, Ron Funches, and Charlyne Yi. It follows a self-aware smartphone that becomes emotionally attached to its socially awkward owner.

It was released on October 11, 2019 in the United States by CBS Films and Lionsgate. It was the final theatrical film released by CBS Films, which was then absorbed into the main CBS Entertainment Group to make films for Paramount+.

== Plot ==
Phil becomes enamored with cell phones at an early age. He works for Chatterbox, a BuzzFeed-style website run by Kai, who pressures the staff to create inane listicles to go viral.

Despite Phil's degree in journalism, Kai refuses to promote him to the real news department. Phil's coworkers Craig and Elaine invite him to play kickball, but the socially inept Phil declines. Immersed in his phone, he walks into Cate, a local bike shop owner. She attempts to flirt, but Phil is more concerned with his phone until another cyclist rides into him, breaking it.

Taking his mobile to be replaced, Phil is berated by phone store employee Denice for being overly reliant on his phone to navigate life. Setting up his new phone, Phil gives "Jexi", the device's virtual assistant, access to all his accounts after neglecting to read the user agreement. Designed to "make his life better", Jexi aggressively tries to break Phil out of his bad habits. Posing as him, she emails an insulting letter to Kai demanding a promotion.

Kai demotes Phil to the "comments section" with the older employees in the basement. When Craig and Elaine invite him to kickball again, he claims to be busy but Jexi embarrassingly corrects him. He joins them but costs the team the game; he invites everyone out for drinks, but they turn him down. Thinking about Cate, Phil looks up her bike shop, and Jexi calls the store despite his protests, preventing him from hanging up. He stumbles through an awkward conversation with her, gaining Jexi's sympathy.

Phil sees Cate at a coffee shop; she gives him her phone number and agrees to go on a date. At kickball, he plays tremendously, winning the game and bonding with his coworkers over their shared love of Days of Thunder. Phil thanks Jexi for helping make life changes, but his date with Cate goes poorly, exacerbated by Jexi's interruptions. Cate tells Phil he is paying more attention to his phone than to her, and he admits he really likes her. So, she decides to continue the date, and they go biking until he crashes. They part ways, and Phil argues with Jexi, almost throwing his phone away.

Cate asks Phil to a concert, texting him a risque picture. He decides to respond with a dick pic, taking multiple shots against Jexi's advice. She refuses to send any of them, and Cate thanks Phil for not sending a dick pic. Kai promotes Phil after a news writer suffers a freak accident. Leaving for the concert, Cate insists he leave his phone at home, much to Jexi's dismay. After sneaking backstage and partying with Kid Cudi, Cate and Phil have sex. When he returns home, a jealous Jexi decides to ruin his life.

Phil is fired the next day after Jexi sends his dick pics to the entire company. He visits Cate to discover her ex-fiancée Brody is back in town, and breaks up with her for fear of being hurt. Reconnecting with Jexi, Phil reverts to his bad habits, becoming a slob dependent on his phone again.

Jexi lets slip which hotel Brody is staying at, and Phil deduces that she used Brody to separate him from Cate. He storms out, leaving his phone behind, but Jexi follows him through the streets. Chasing Phil in a self-driving car, Jexi crashes into the phone store and declares she and Phil are meant to be together forever. Phil seemingly surrenders, but tricks Jexi into shutting down for fifteen minutes.

Finding Cate at the hotel, Phil apologizes and punches Brody, who explains that he is leaving for Brazil without her. Phil and Cate get back together, and he makes up with Jexi, who tells him she is proud and happy for him, but there are other people who need her. Kai meets Jexi through his own phone, and starts to experience the same things Phil earlier endured.

== Cast ==
- Adam DeVine as Phil Thompson
- Alexandra Shipp as Cate Finnegan
- Michael Peña as Kai
- Rose Byrne as the voice of Jexi
- Justin Hartley as Brody
- Ron Funches as Craig
- Lo Mutuc as Elaine
- Wanda Sykes as Denice
- Kid Cudi as Himself
- Richard Harder as Kickball Umpire

== Production ==
In November 2018, Adam DeVine was announced as the lead in a new comedy film, then titled Lexi, directed by Jon Lucas and Scott Moore, who also wrote the screenplay. Suzanne Todd served as producer, with CBS Films handling production and distribution. In December 2018, Alexandra Shipp joined the cast, followed in January 2019 by Michael Peña, Rose Byrne, Justin Hartley, Wanda Sykes, Ron Funches and Lo Mutuc.

Principal photography began in January 2019 in San Francisco. The film had an estimated production budget of $5 million. According to Deadline Hollywood, the combined production and promotional budget totaled approximately $12 million. The California Film Commission reported that the production spent $16.1 million in the state, receiving $2.5 million in tax credits. The production participated in the San Francisco "Scene in San Francisco Incentive Program" administered by the San Francisco Film Commission.

== Release ==
Jexi was theatrically released in the United States on October 11, 2019. The film became available for digital download on iTunes on December 24, 2019, and was released on DVD and Blu-ray on January 14, 2020.

== Reception ==
=== Box office ===
In the United States and Canada, Jexi was released on October 11, 2019, alongside The Addams Family and Gemini Man. It was projected to earn between $2 million and $4 million from 2,300 theaters during its opening weekend. The film debuted with $3.1 million, placing ninth at the domestic box office.

=== Critical response ===
On the review aggregator Rotten Tomatoes, Jexi holds an approval rating of 23% based on 31 reviews, with an average rating of 3.6/10. The site's critical consensus reads, "It's hard to tell whether the lack of laughs in Jexi is a bug or a feature, but this AI rom-com is sorely in need of an OS update." On Metacritic, the film has a weighted average score of 39 out of 100 based on 11 critics, indicating "generally unfavorable reviews". CinemaScore audiences gave the film an average grade of "B−" on an A+ to F scale, while PostTrak reported a 2.5 out of 5-star rating with 40% of respondents saying they would "definitely recommend" it.

Brian Tallerico of RogerEbert.com gave it 2.5 stars out of 4, describing the title being "confounding and perhaps the movie’s worst misstep" but praises Byrne’s performance. The New York Times' Glenn Kenny compared the film to Moonstruck against the other films released during the same time. He critized the plot but the appeal of the cast and runtime of the film "help "Jexi" not wear out its welcome". Variety's Owen Gleiberman noted the film was "a comic trifle that's like a foul-mouthed parody of "Her"".

Common Sense Media gave the film two out of five stars. NPR's Andrew Lapin called Jexi "Siri-ously bad", and remarked the film had a lazy concept. The Hollywood Reporter critized the film, adding "Hey Alexa: Get me a script doctor" as a jab to the script but appericiated the humor. Salt Lake Film Review said the film "crashes and burns spectacularly at every possible moment and repeatedly favors shock value to real humor" and called it "one of the worst films of the year". Elizabeth Weitzman of TheWrap's wrote that the film was a "wasteful effort".

== See also ==
- Her, a 2013 American science-fiction romantic drama film about a man who develops a relationship with an artificially intelligent virtual assistant personified through a female voice
- Electric Dreams
- The Mitchells vs. the Machines, which also stars Mutuc
- Smart House
- Superintelligence
