= Nora McInerny =

American author

Nora McInerny is an American author. She writes about dealing with grief and loss, drawing on her personal experience of miscarrying a child and losing both her father and husband to cancer within several weeks in 2014.

== Early life and education ==
Nora McInerny is from Minneapolis. She comes from an Irish Catholic family and attended high school at DeLaSalle High School, graduating in 2001. She attended college at Xavier University in Cincinnati, Ohio, graduating in 2005.

== Works ==
McInerny wrote about her husband's illness, subsequent death, and her feelings of grief on her blog "My Husband's Tumor", which had 200,000 followers. In 2016, McInerny published a memoir entitled It's Okay to Laugh (Crying Is Cool Too). In 2019, McInerny's book No Happy Endings was released. A third book, Hot Young Widows Club, was also published in 2019. Bad Vibes Only (2022) addressed toxic positivity.

In 2020 McInerny published Bad Moms: The Novel based on the 2016 movie.

She is also the host of a podcast called "Terrible, Thanks for Asking." She hosts and produces several other podcasts under the company Feelings & Co, which focuses on storytelling, empathy, and the human experience. In 2018, McInerny gave a talk about grief at TEDWomen.

== Nonprofit and support group ==
In 2015, McInerny founded the nonprofit "Still Kickin," which got its name from a phrase on one of her late husband's t-shirts. Each month the nonprofit designated a "Still Kickin Hero" struggling with illness, death, or other challenges, who then receives the proceeds from the sales of branded merchandise. The nonprofit has not been active since 2021.

McInerny created the Facebook grief support group called the "Hot Young Widows Club". The group has hundreds of members, approximately 6% of whom are men.

== Personal life ==
In 2010, McInerny began dating Aaron Purmort. While they were dating, Purmort was diagnosed with glioblastoma, an aggressive brain cancer. McInerny and Purmort became engaged at the hospital the night he was diagnosed. They were married and had a son together in 2013. In 2014, McInerny experienced a miscarriage shortly before the death of her father. Purmort died in November 2014 from his cancer. Before his death, McInerny and Purmort were able to co-write his obituary, which was covered by news outlets due to its humor.

In 2017, McInerny married Matthew Hart. Together, they have one son. They live together with their son and their three children from previous marriages.
