= A Bad Moms Christmas =

2017 American Christmas comedy film

- Theatrical release poster
- Directed by: Scott Moore; Jon Lucas
- Written by: Jon Lucas; Scott Moore
- Produced by: Suzanne Todd
- Starring: Mila Kunis; Kristen Bell; Kathryn Hahn; Cheryl Hines; Christine Baranski; Susan Sarandon
- Cinematography: Mitchell Amundsen
- Edited by: James Thomas
- Music by: Christopher Lennertz
- Production companies: STXfilms; H. Brothers; Tang Media Productions
- Distributed by: STXfilms
- Release dates: October 30, 2017 (Regency Village Theater); November 1, 2017 (United States)
- Running time: 104 minutes
- Country: United States
- Language: English
- Budget: $28 million
- Box office: $130 million

A Bad Moms Christmas is a 2017 American Christmas comedy film written and directed by Jon Lucas and Scott Moore. It is a sequel to the 2016 film Bad Moms. The plot follows the three moms from the first film (Mila Kunis, Kristen Bell, and Kathryn Hahn) dealing with their own mothers (Christine Baranski, Cheryl Hines, and Susan Sarandon) visiting during the Christmas holiday.

The film was released in the United States on November 1, 2017, and grossed over $130 million. It received mixed-to-negative reviews, with criticism aimed at the thin story and raunchiness. In April 2019, it was announced that a sequel was in development then scrapped.

== Plot ==
Amy Mitchell is now in a happy relationship with Jessie Harkness and plans to have a simple Christmas with her kids, Jane and Dylan; and Jessie’s daughter, Lori. However, her plans are derailed as her overly-critical mother, Ruth, texts her to inform her that she is coming to stay for the holidays. Meanwhile, Kiki Moore is still overworked with her four kids, but her husband, Kent, helps much more than before. Her mother, Sandy, overwhelms her by showing up earlier than expected and for three weeks. Carla Dunkler's mother, Isis, has arrived unexpectedly for the first time in years. Although happy to see Isis, Carla realizes that she probably wants money.

Amy, Kiki, and Carla go to the mall and commiserate over the holidays. Complaining about the pressure, they make a pact to "take Christmas back." Ruth tries to overdo Christmas, rather than keep it simple as Amy wants. Attempting to tamp down those plans, Amy takes the family to Sky Zone instead of Ruth's plan for the Russian version of the Nutcracker to meet up with Kiki, Carla, and their families. The grandmothers finally meet and chat, and Ruth admits that her mother abused her when she grew up.

Carla meets erotic dancer Ty at work, who is in town participating in a Sexy Santa competition. She enthusiastically accepts his offer to be her date. Continuing to struggle with her mother's overbearingness, Kiki brings Sandy to her therapist Dr. Karl, where they have a communication breakdown. Kiki scolds her and Sandy leaves, and the therapist blames Kiki for her "craziness." After caroling with the family, Amy finally convinces Ruth to let her plan Christmas.

Amy and Kiki join Carla at the Sexy Santa show. Everyone is impressed with Ty's dancing. Isis then gets on the bar and starts dancing with him. When Carla also gets up to get Ty back, Isis falls off and hits her head, which causes Carla to cancel her date with Ty. When Isis recovers, she asks for money for a new investment. Carla supposes that she will just gamble it away and then disappear, as always, but lends her the money.

On Christmas Eve, when Sandy tells Kiki that she is moving in next door to be closer with her, Kiki finally lashes out. Told that she needs space, Sandy leaves upset. At the same time, Amy loses it after she discovers Ruth lied and has invited strangers to her home for an elaborate Christmas party against her wishes.

Seeing that Ruth is doing that to make herself relevant rather than make her grandkids happy, she orders the guests to leave. Mother and daughter then fight and accidentally tear down the decorations. The enraged Amy tells Ruth to get out of her life forever. Jane and Dylan witness the outburst and become upset with Amy. Meanwhile, Carla finds Isis's goodbye note.

Ruth goes to church for Midnight Mass and is joined by Sandy and Isis. They criticize one another for their efforts as mothers. Amy's father Hank talks to her about her horrible fight with her mom, but he reveals that Ruth, while difficult to deal with at times, is actually incredibly insecure and has always worried whether or not she is doing a good job as a mother but has good intentions and loves Amy unconditionally.

Amy finds Ruth at the church and they reconcile and confess how much they genuinely love each other. As the clock strikes midnight, Amy and her mother rush home to redecorate the house.

On Christmas morning, Jane and Dylan come downstairs to see that all is wonderful. Kiki makes up with Sandy, who is reselling the neighboring house and admits that she has always felt lonely on Christmas since Kiki's father died. Isis visits Carla, who is turning her life around and has a new job at Sky Zone. Carla invites her to stay for a while, and she accepts.

All of the families get together for an unorthodox Christmas dinner. Amy, Kiki, and Carla applaud one another for doing what they set out to do; Ty, who has legitimately fallen in love with Carla, tracks her to Amy's to start a relationship with her; Ruth, Sandy, and Isis announce that they have become friends and are now heading to Las Vegas to see Wayne Newton, something that Kiki had suggested.

The end credits feature dancing from characters in the film.

== Cast ==
- Mila Kunis as Amy Redmond-Mitchell
- Kristen Bell as Kiki Wilson-Moore
- Kathryn Hahn as Carla Dunkler
- Christina Applegate as Gwendolyn James
- Christine Baranski as Ruth Redmond, Amy's mother and Hank's wife
- Cheryl Hines as Sandy Wilson, Kiki's mother
- Susan Sarandon as Isis Dunkler, Carla's mother
- Jay Hernandez as Jessie Harkness
- Peter Gallagher as Hank Redmond, Amy's father and Ruth's husband
- Justin Hartley as Ty Swindle
- Oona Laurence as Jane Mitchell
- Emjay Anthony as Dylan Mitchell
- Wanda Sykes as Dr. Elizabeth Karl
- Ariana Greenblatt as Lori Harkness
- Kenny G as himself
- Cade Cooksey as Jaxon Dunkler
- Jacks Dean as Bernard Moore
- Madison Muffley as Clare Moore
- Lyle Brocato as Kent Moore
- Phil Pierce as Mall Santa

== Production ==
In December 2016, it was announced that A Bad Moms Christmas would be released on November 3, 2017, and that it would be Christmas-themed, with Bell, Hahn, and Kunis returning to reprise their roles. The release date was subsequently moved up two days to November 1, 2017. In April 2017, Justin Hartley joined the cast of the film, and in May 2017, Susan Sarandon, Christine Baranski, and Cheryl Hines joined as the mothers' mothers, alongside Wanda Sykes and Jay Hernandez reprising their roles from the first film.

Principal photography on the film began in Atlanta on May 1, 2017.

== Release ==
A Bad Moms Christmas was released on Wednesday, November 1, 2017. It was originally scheduled for November 3, 2017, but was brought forward two days to avoid direct competition with Thor: Ragnarok.

In Australia, the film was released under the title Bad Moms 2.

=== Home media ===
The film was released by Universal Pictures Home Entertainment on DVD and Blu-ray on February 6, 2018, in the United States and Canada.

== Reception ==
=== Box office ===
A Bad Moms Christmas grossed $72.1 million in the United States and Canada and $58.5 million in other countries, for a worldwide total of $130 million, against a production budget of $28 million.

In North America, the film was projected to gross around $25 million from 3,615 theaters in its first five days, including $17 million over the weekend. It took in $2.7 million on its first day and $17 million over the weekend, for a five-day total of $21.6 million, finishing second at the box office behind Thor: Ragnarok.

=== Critical response ===
The review aggregator Rotten Tomatoes reports that 32% of 128 critics have given the film a positive review, with a rating average of 4.40/10. The site's critics consensus reads, "Featuring twice the moms but roughly half the laughs, A Bad Moms Christmas is a slapdash holiday sequel that falls short of the original with a disappointing dearth of good cheer." On Metacritic, which assigns a normalized rating to reviews, the film has a weighted average score of 42 out of 100, based on 30 critics, indicating "mixed or average" reviews. Audiences polled by CinemaScore gave the film an average grade of "B" on an A+ to F scale, down from the "A" earned by the first film, and PostTrak reported filmgoers gave it a "very low" 68% overall positive score.

Owen Gleiberman of Variety gave the film a mixed review and wrote, "A Bad Moms Christmas should appeal to the same—dare I say it?—demo that Bad Moms did, even though it's not nearly as wild a comedy. It has one halfway original idea, which is that when you're a mom yourself, the ability of your own mom to drive you nuts is heightened to the third power because you're competing on levels that are almost primal." Pete Hammond of Deadline Hollywood gave the film a positive review, calling it a "good time movie" and writing that "it goes way over the top, but I have to confess I laughed—a lot—and that's obviously the point even if this is not critic's fodder or meant to be. Subtle this is not, but A Bad Moms Christmas is the perfect tonic to lift your spirits and forget your troubles in these dark times."

== Canceled sequel ==
In April 2019 during CinemaCon, it was announced that a sequel titled Bad Moms' Moms was in development. Sarandon, Baranski, and Hines were due to reprise their roles. In June 2021, it was reported that Bad Moms' Moms had been postponed because of the COVID-19 pandemic and then canceled.

== See also ==
- List of Christmas films
