= Office Christmas Party =

2016 American comedy film

- Theatrical release poster
- Directed by: Will Speck Josh Gordon
- Screenplay by: Justin Malen; Laura Solon; Dan Mazer
- Story by: Jon Lucas; Scott Moore; Timothy Dowling
- Produced by: Scott Stuber; Guymon Casady; Daniel Rappaport
- Starring: Jason Bateman; Olivia Munn; T.J. Miller; Jillian Bell; Courtney B. Vance; Rob Corddry; Kate McKinnon; Jennifer Aniston
- Cinematography: Jeff Cutter
- Edited by: Jeff Groth; Evan Henke
- Music by: Theodore Shapiro
- Production companies: DreamWorks Pictures; Reliance Entertainment; Bluegrass Films; Entertainment 360
- Distributed by: Paramount Pictures
- Release dates: December 5, 2016 (New York City); December 9, 2016 (United States)
- Running time: 105 minutes
- Country: United States
- Language: English
- Budget: $45 million
- Box office: $114.5 million

Office Christmas Party is a 2016 American Christmas comedy film directed by Will Speck and Josh Gordon. The film stars an ensemble cast consisting of Jason Bateman, Olivia Munn, T.J. Miller, Jillian Bell, Vanessa Bayer, Courtney B. Vance, Rob Corddry, Kate McKinnon, and Jennifer Aniston. It tells the story of two co-workers who throw an extravagant Christmas party at their workplace in order to prevent a layoff of 40% of the company's employees.

Office Christmas Party premiered in New York City on December 5, 2016 and was released on December 9, 2016, by Paramount Pictures. It received mixed reviews from critics and was a modest success, grossing $114.5 million worldwide against a $45 million budget.

== Plot ==
Newly divorced Josh Parker works as the chief technology officer of Zenotek in Chicago. Carol Vanstone, the Interim CEO following the death of her father and former CEO, arrives to notify Josh and her brother Clay Vanstone, the Chicago branch manager, that they failed to meet its new quarterly quota. Carol, bitter over Clay being their father's favorite, threatens to shut down the branch if they do not cancel their employee bonuses and the annual Christmas party. Clay, desperate to appease the staff and impress Carol, informs her about a meeting with financial giant Walter Davis; they will attempt to acquire a $14 million contract with Walter's company, Data City, with the help of their R&D chief Tracey Hughes. Carol says that if they can land that contract, she will agree not to make cuts at the company.

At the meeting, Walter says he likes Zenotek's product but has concerns about its corporate culture. In a bid to secure the deal, Clay invites him to the Christmas party, hoping to show him their company has a healthy employee environment. On her way to the airport, Carol stops by Josh's apartment to offer him a position working for her at the company's headquarters in New York at twice his salary.

Clay funds an exorbitant Christmas party that vexes their head of Human Resources, Mary. The party struggles to pick up, even with Chicago Bulls player Jimmy Butler present. However, the party amps up with the arrival of Savannah, a prostitute hired by IT director Nate to pose as his girlfriend. Her cocaine is mistakenly placed in a snow-blowing machine, dousing the employees and Walter. They become even rowdier, resulting in orgies in the restroom and damage to the company's property. As Clay wins over Walter, Josh and Tracey nearly kiss on the roof.

Carol's flight to New York is cancelled due to bad weather, and she rushes back to the branch when she learns about the party. After Walter is hospitalized attempting to swing off a balcony, the team learns that Walter was fired from Data City earlier in the day, making their entire gambit to save the branch pointless. Carol shuts down the branch for defying her orders and loudly mentions her job offer to Josh in front of everyone. Despite not accepting the offer, he is confronted by Tracey for not having explicitly turned Carol down. Feeling betrayed, Clay rushes off with Savannah's gun-toting pimp, Trina, who wants to rob his personal safe. Josh, Tracey, Mary, and Carol race to save him.

Hearing the branch is shutting down instigates a riot, resulting in more property damage. Josh authorizes security guard Carla to shut down the party. Clay races Trina's car towards an opening drawbridge, attempting to jump the gap, a feat he had earlier mentioned to Josh. Driving Mary's minivan alongside him, Josh tries to convince Clay not to jump, but the despondent Clay refuses to listen. Carol takes the wheel and runs Clay's car into an internet hub to stop him, disconnecting the entire city.

Trina and Savannah are arrested, while Clay is taken to the hospital. The internet blackout inspires Tracey to implement an innovation combining internet Wi-Fi with wire connections through the power grid, which had previously failed. They race back to the destroyed office to set up her tech, which successfully restores internet access to the city and saves the branch. Clay apologizes to Carol for his behavior and for how their father treated her. Walter, in the same hospital, agrees to join the team. Josh and Tracey kiss amidst the ruins of the office. The team meets Carol and Clay at the hospital and they all go out for breakfast, driving recklessly on the way.

== Cast ==
- Jason Bateman as Josh Parker, the CTO of Zenotek's Chicago branch
- Olivia Munn as Tracey Hughes, the Chief of R&D at Zenotek's Chicago branch
- T.J. Miller as Clay Vanstone, the branch manager of Zenotek's Chicago branch
- Jennifer Aniston as Carol Vanstone, the interim CEO of Zenotek's Chicago branch and the sister of Clay
- Kate McKinnon as Mary Winetoss, the human resources representative of Zenotek's Chicago branch
- Jillian Bell as Trina, a gun-toting pimp
- Courtney B. Vance as Walter Davis, the representative of a huge financial company
- Vanessa Bayer as Allison Parker, Clay's assistant at Zenotek's Chicago branch
- Rob Corddry as Jeremy Parker, the customer service supervisor at Zenotek's Chicago branch
- Karan Soni as Nate Winetoss, the IT director at Zenotek's Chicago branch
- Sam Richardson as Joel, an employee at Zenotek's Chicago branch who serves as DJ during the party
- Randall Park as Fred, a new employee at Zenotek's Chicago branch
- Abbey Lee as Savannah, an escort who works with Trina
- Jamie Chung as Meghan, one of the office workers at Zenotek's Chicago branch
- Da'Vine Joy Randolph as Carla, a security guard at Zenotek's Chicago branch
- Fortune Feimster as Lonny, the Uber Driver
- Matt Walsh as Ezra, Josh's divorce lawyer
- Ben Falcone as a doctor who tends to Clay after he jumps out of the window during the office Christmas party at Zenotek's Chicago branch
- Chloe Wepper as Kelsey, one of the office workers at Zenotek's Chicago branch
- Oliver Cooper as Drew, one of Nate's staff members at Zenotek's Chicago branch
- Adrian Martinez as Larry, one of the office workers at Zenotek's Chicago branch
- Erick Chavarria as Alan, one of the office workers at Zenotek's Chicago branch
- Andrew Leeds as Tim, one of Nate's staff members at Zenotek's Chicago branch
- Jimmy Butler as himself, he attends the office Christmas party at Zenotek's Chicago branch
- Michael Tourek as Alexei

== Production ==
In 2010, Guymon Casady approached Will Speck and Josh Gordon with an original idea of his, to make a movie about a holiday office party. They subsequently set the concept up at DreamWorks Pictures, and it was later rewritten by Lee Eisenberg, Gene Stupnitsky, and Laura Solon. On February 19, 2016, it was announced that Speck and Gordon would also direct the film to be distributed by Paramount Pictures, which would star Jennifer Aniston, Jason Bateman, T.J. Miller, and Kate McKinnon. On March 8, 2016, Randall Park joined the film, and Olivia Munn was cast on March 17. On April 4, 2016, Abbey Lee Kershaw joined the cast. Karan Soni, Da'Vine Joy Randolph, and Jamie Chung were added on April 5, 2016, and on April 6, 2016, Rob Corddry, Andrew Leeds, and Oliver Cooper were cast as well.

Principal photography on the film began late March 2016 in Atlanta, Georgia. In early April, filming took place in Chicago, Illinois, and after that production moved to Hiram, Georgia, where it shot from April 19 to June 1, 2016.

On casting Aniston in the film, Gordon stated, "We created this character for Jennifer because she's absolutely fearless when it comes to playing somewhat unlikeable characters in comedies. For her, the more daring the role, the better."

== Release ==
Office Christmas Party was released in the United States on December 9, 2016, by Paramount Pictures. Paramount also distributed it internationally, except in several territories, where Mister Smith Entertainment handled international sales and India, where Reliance Entertainment distributed the film.

== Reception ==
=== Box office ===
Office Christmas Party grossed $54.8 million in the United States and Canada and $59.7 million in other territories for a worldwide total of $114.5 million, against a production budget of $45 million.

Office Christmas Party was released alongside The Bounce Back and the wide expansions of Miss Sloane and Nocturnal Animals, and was expected to gross $13–15 million from 3,210 theaters in its opening weekend. It went on to make $16.9 million in its opening weekend, finishing second at the box office and on par with recent R-rated comedies like How to Be Single and Sisters. The opening weekend audience was 56% male, and 83% was over the age of 25.

=== Critical response ===
Office Christmas Party received mixed reviews from critics. On Rotten Tomatoes, the film has an approval rating of 41% based on 185 reviews and an average rating of 4.9/10. The site's critical consensus reads, "Its cast of gifted comics is good for a handful of laughs, but Office Christmas Party's overstuffed plot ultimately proves roughly as disappointing as its clichéd gags and forced sentimentality." On Metacritic, the film had a weighted average score of 42 out of 100 based on 35 critics, indicating "mixed or average reviews". Audiences polled by CinemaScore gave the film an average grade of "B" on an A+ to F scale. Vanity Fair critic Jordan Hoffman gave the film a positive review, highlighting several comedic performances by the ensemble cast. Many critics highlighted that while the film featured a highly talented ensemble cast, their comedic abilities were largely wasted on an unfocused script. Sheri Linden of The Hollywood Reporter wrote that the film "hasn't the slightest satiric edge," calling it a "frenetic grab bag of strained shtick, however expertly delivered by ace comic performers." Similarly, Peter Debruge of Variety argued that the film suffered from pacing issues, noting that "every second spent justifying the company's existence is a second not invested in making this the funniest Office Christmas Party it can possibly be."

=== Home media ===
The film was released on Digital HD on March 21, 2017, before being released on DVD and Blu-ray on April 4, 2017.

In Germany the title was changed for the home release, with the film named Dirty Office Party.

== See also ==
- List of Christmas films
