= Ghosts of Girlfriends Past =

2009 film by Mark Waters

- Theatrical release poster
- Directed by: Mark Waters
- Written by: Jon Lucas; Scott Moore
- Based on: A Christmas Carol by Charles Dickens
- Produced by: Jon Shestack; Brad Epstein
- Starring: Matthew McConaughey; Jennifer Garner; Breckin Meyer; Lacey Chabert; Robert Forster; Anne Archer; Emma Stone; Michael Douglas
- Cinematography: Daryn Okada
- Edited by: Bruce Green
- Music by: Rolfe Kent
- Production company: New Line Cinema
- Distributed by: Warner Bros. Pictures
- Release date: May 1, 2009
- Running time: 100 minutes
- Country: United States
- Language: English
- Budget: $37.5 million
- Box office: $102.4 million

Ghosts of Girlfriends Past is a 2009 American fantasy romantic comedy film directed by Mark Waters. The script was written by Jon Lucas and Scott Moore, based on Charles Dickens' 1843 novella A Christmas Carol. The film stars Matthew McConaughey, Jennifer Garner, Breckin Meyer, Lacey Chabert, Robert Forster, Anne Archer, Emma Stone, and Michael Douglas. It was released in the United States on May 1, 2009, by Warner Bros. Pictures.

Ghosts of Girlfriends Past features a wedding day and the day before, rather than the familiar Christmas and Christmas Eve from A Christmas Carol. The three ghosts share similar appearances with the original descriptions, and the film shares the traditional plot points from the book.

== Plot ==
Connor Mead is a famous photographer and infamous womanizer. After breaking up with three women simultaneously on a conference call to save time, he travels to his late uncle Wayne's estate in Newport, Rhode Island, to attend the wedding of his younger brother Paul to Sandra. There, he becomes reacquainted with Jenny Perotti, the only woman who captured his heart.

At the rehearsal dinner, Connor delivers a drunken speech and makes a pass at Sandra's attractive and flirtatious mother Vonda, and also unintentionally offends her ex-husband, the stern Sergeant Volkom, Sandra's father. He is then visited by the ghost of the inveterate playboy Wayne, who warns Connor that he will be visited by three ghosts who will lead him through his romantic past, present, and future.

The first is the "Ghost of Girlfriends Past" in the form of Allison, his first lover. They revisit scenes from his past, focusing on his relationship with Jenny. She and Connor were very close at school; she gave him his first instant camera which he used to take her picture, promising to keep it forever, and was even there for Connor when his parents died. By middle school, they were on the verge of romance, but Connor's hesitation at a dance caused Jenny to dance with and kiss another boy.

Wayne, now Connor and Paul's legal guardian, advised a heartbroken Connor to avoid romance at all costs in order not to feel such pain again, and began to teach him his techniques as a pickup artist. When he next saw Jenny, he ignored her in favor of Allison. Several years later, Connor and Jenny met again and rekindled their romance. After spending the night together, Connor realized that he was falling in love and panicked, leaving Jenny to wake up alone and broken-hearted.

Back in the present, Connor accidentally destroys the wedding cake and fails to reconcile with Jenny. He is confronted by the "Ghost of Girlfriends Present" in the form of his assistant Melanie, who shows him the other members of the wedding party making fun of his shallow lifestyle. Paul expresses his love for Connor, noting all of the sacrifices he made to take care of him when their parents died, and his hope that he will someday improve. Meanwhile, Jenny is being comforted by Brad, which upsets Connor. Melanie and his newly jilted trio of lovers discuss his lack of empathy.

Sandra hears of Connor's accidental revelation that Paul slept with one of her bridesmaids early in their relationship, and furiously confronts Paul. A returned Connor attempts to mend the situation, but Paul tells him to leave. He is visited by the "Ghost of Girlfriends Future", who takes him forward in time to see that Jenny marries Brad while both Connor and Paul remain alone. Further in the future, Paul is the only mourner at Connor's funeral. Wayne appears and tells Connor that this is his fate if he continues on the same path, pushing him into the grave to be buried by his many ex-girlfriends.

Waking up in bed, Connor is relieved to find it is early on the day of the wedding, but discovers that Sandra has called it off and departed. Intercepting her car, he convinces her to forgive Paul, saying that the pain of heartbreak is outweighed by the regret of never risking one's heart in the first place. At the restored festivities—where he serves as the wedding photographer—Connor reconciles with Jenny by showing her the picture he still carries of her. They kiss and dance in the snow to the same song he once hesitated to ask her to dance to.

His work complete, Uncle Wayne strikes out with the Ghost of Girlfriends Future, tries to hit on Melanie before her corporeally present counterpart dances with Brad, and is finally rejected by Allison, the Ghost of Girlfriends Past, who still appears 16.

== Cast ==
- Matthew McConaughey as Connor "Dutch" Mead, a ladies man. Based on Ebenezer Scrooge.
  - Devin Brochu as young Connor
  - Logan Miller as teenage Connor
- Jennifer Garner as Jenny Perotti. Based on Ebenezer Scrooge's ex-fiancée Belle.
  - Kasey Russell as young Jenny
  - Christa B. Allen as teenage Jenny
- Michael Douglas as Wayne S. Mead, Connor and Paul's uncle and legal guardian. Based on Ebenezer Scrooge's business partner Jacob Marley, depicted as a not-so-thinly-veiled caricature of Hollywood producer Robert Evans.
- Breckin Meyer as Paul Mead, Connor's younger brother. Based on Ebenezer Scrooge's nephew Fred.
- Lacey Chabert as Sandra Volkom, Paul's fiancée
- Robert Forster as Sergeant Major Mervis Volkom
- Anne Archer as Vonda Volkom
- Emma Stone as Allison Vandermeersh, the Ghost of Girlfriends Past
- Daniel Sunjata as Brad Frye
- Noureen DeWulf as Melanie, the Ghost of Girlfriends Present. Based on Bob Cratchit.
- Rachel Boston as Deena
- Camille Guaty as Donna
- Amanda Walsh as Denice
- Emily Foxler as Nadja
- Olga Maliouk as the Ghost of Girlfriends Future
- Christina Milian as Kalia (uncredited)

== Production ==
Ghosts of Girlfriends Past was originally set up in 2004 at Touchstone Pictures with Ben Affleck attached to play the lead character and Kevin Smith to direct, but both opted out and Disney cancelled the project. Betty Thomas was also attached to direct at one point, and Affleck's LivePlanet was also on board to produce.

It was primarily filmed at Crane Castle in Ipswich, Massachusetts. The church scene with Garner marrying another man was filmed at the Martha-Mary Chapel in Sudbury, Massachusetts. It was built by Henry Ford in honor of his mother and mother in law. It is on the same property as the historic Wayside Inn, dating from 1716. It is the oldest operating inn in the country. The film also reunited Michael Douglas and Anne Archer for the first time since the 1987 thriller Fatal Attraction, but they shared no scenes together. Christa B. Allen played the younger version of Garner's character, as she did in 13 Going on 30 in 2004.

== Soundtrack ==
1. "Ghosts of Girlfriends Past" - All Too Much featuring Matthew Sweet
2. "Hush" - Gavin Rossdale and All Too Much
3. "Got a Lot of Love for You Baby" - The Ralph Sall Experience
4. "Keep on Loving You" - REO Speedwagon
5. "Time After Time" - Cyndi Lauper
6. "L-O-V-E" - Nat "King" Cole
7. "You Can't Hurry Love" - The Ralph Sall Experience
8. "Ladies Night" - Kool & the Gang
9. "The Safety Dance" - Men Without Hats
10. "Yeah (Dream of Me)" - All Too Much
11. "Holding Back the Years" - Simply Red
12. "Sleep" - All Too Much

== Home media ==
The film was released on DVD and Blu-ray on September 22, 2009.

== Reception ==
=== Box office ===
On the film's opening weekend, it debuted at number two with a gross of $15.4 million (3,175 theaters, $4,854 average), far behind X-Men Origins: Wolverine's $85.1 million gross. The film made $55.3 million in the United States and Canada along with $47.1 million from foreign territories for a worldwide total of $102.4 million.

=== Critical response ===
On the review aggregator website Rotten Tomatoes, Ghosts of Girlfriends Past holds an approval rating of 27% based on 143 reviews, with an average rating of 4.3/10. The website's critics consensus reads, "A retread of A Christmas Carol, featuring Matthew McConaughey in a retread of his Dazed and Confused role, Ghosts of Girlfriends Past lacks originality, humor, and any semblance of charm." Metacritic assigned the film a weighted average score of 34 out of 100 based on 29 critics, indicating "generally unfavorable" reviews. Audiences polled by CinemaScore gave the film an average grade of "B" on an A+ to F scale.

== See also ==
- Adaptations of A Christmas Carol
- List of ghost films
