= Jeff Groth (film editor) =

American film editor

- Occupation: Film editor

Jeff Groth is an American film editor. He has worked with Todd Phillips on The Hangover Part III, War Dogs, and Joker. His work on Joker earned him a nomination for the Academy Award for Best Film Editing at the 92nd Academy Awards.

Groth also edited the films Project X and The Wedding Ringer, and worked on episodes of the television series Entourage, Community, and Ballers.

== Filmography ==
Year	Film	Notes
2008	Man Maid	
2012	Project X	
2013	The Hangover Part III	Co-edited with Debra Neil-Fisher
2015	The Wedding Ringer	
2015	Entourage	
2016	War Dogs	
2016	Office Christmas Party	Co-edited with Evan Henke
2019	Joker	
2021	Cherry	
2022	The Gray Man	Co-edited with Pietro Scalia
2024	Joker: Folie à Deux	
2024	Better Man	Co-edited with Spencer Susser, Martin Connor, Lee Smith and Patrick Correll
2026	Mr. Irrelevant	In post-production
