= The Change-Up =

2011 film by David Dobkin

- Theatrical release poster
- Directed by: David Dobkin
- Written by: Jon Lucas; Scott Moore
- Produced by: David Dobkin; Neal H. Moritz
- Starring: Ryan Reynolds; Jason Bateman; Leslie Mann; Olivia Wilde; Alan Arkin
- Cinematography: Eric Edwards
- Edited by: Lee Haxall; Greg Hayden
- Music by: John Debney; Theodore Shapiro
- Production companies: Original Film; Relativity Media; Big Kid Pictures
- Distributed by: Universal Pictures
- Release date: August 5, 2011 (United States)
- Running time: 112 minutes
- Country: United States
- Language: English
- Budget: $52 million
- Box office: $75.5 million

The Change-Up is a 2011 American fantasy romantic comedy produced and directed by David Dobkin, and written by Jon Lucas and Scott Moore. The film stars Ryan Reynolds and Jason Bateman.

Mitch Planko and Dave Lockwood, best friends living in Atlanta, “switch bodies” after urinating into a fountain while wishing they had each other's lives.

The film was released on August 5, 2011, in North America by Universal Pictures, received negative reviews from critics and grossed $75.5 million against a $52 million budget.

== Plot ==
In Atlanta, Dave Lockwood is married with three children, while his best friend Mitch Planko is single and in his sexual prime. After getting drunk at a bar, Mitch and Dave urinate into a fountain, simultaneously wishing they had each other's lives.

The next morning, Mitch and Dave realize they have “switched bodies.” Returning to the park to wish for their lives back, they discover the fountain has been removed for restoration. Forced to wait until the parks department locates the fountain, Mitch and Dave have to pose as each other.

At Dave's law office, Mitch befriends Dave's associate Sabrina, but his lack of professionalism and legal knowledge sabotages an important merger with a Japanese firm. Dave arrives at Mitch's film shoot, discovering it is a "lorno" – "light" pornography.

Dave takes Mitch to tell his wife Jamie the truth, but she does not believe them. So, they reluctantly take on each other's lives. Dave advises him on how to behave professionally, and Mitch sets Dave up on a date with Sabrina, as Mitch has a crush.

After speaking with his father, Mitch rededicates himself to Dave's life. At her ballet recital, Dave's eldest child Cara takes Mitch's advice and throws her bully to the floor, which Mitch foul-mouthedly cheers. Cara tells him she loves him, and he says the same but feels guilty.

Dave takes the day off to take full advantage of being Mitch, who coaches him on how to act like him on the date and shaves off Dave's pubic hair. Sabrina meets Dave at a classy restaurant and, despite only going because Mitch told her to, genuinely likes him. After they spontaneously decide to get tattoos, Dave walks Sabrina home and she tells him to call her.

Mitch learns that Dave told Jamie not to invite him to their anniversary party, as he was afraid he would ruin it. Dave informs Mitch the fountain has been found, but they both want to stay as each other a bit longer. Mitch forgets about the "Dialogue Night" he planned with Jamie, so accidentally stands her up.

At the new merger meeting, the Japanese representatives offer only $625 million, $75 million short. As Dave's firm is about to agree, Mitch observes that the other representatives have not yet left, and compares the negotiations to sex and porn. He demands $725 million and has the representatives of Dave's firm begin to leave, scaring the other firm into an agreement. Mitch and Dave's family then go to a gala held by the firm in honor of Dave being made partner, but Jamie is upset by the speech that praises his family values.

Dave and Sabrina are at a baseball game when a thunderstorm hits, so they wait it out at Mitch's house. She tells him she is going to have sex with him, but when he sees her tattoo of a many-spotted skipperling – his daughter's favorite butterfly – his focus returns to his family, and he abruptly leaves.

At the gala, Dave's boss delivers a speech about his accomplishments and love for his family, filling Mitch with guilt. Dave rushes in and kisses Jamie, finally convincing her that he is her husband. He and Mitch find the fountain, now located at a mall, surrounded by people.

Proceeding with their plan to urinate in the fountain, Mitch is too embarrassed, especially after the crowd notices Dave doing so. Mitch asks why he did not invite him to his anniversary party, so Dave admits he was embarrassed by Mitch, but has grown to respect him while in his body. This relaxes Mitch enough to urinate, but their wish does not work. Security approaches, but on Mitch and Dave's third try, the mall's lights go out, and they run.

In an epilogue, Dave and Mitch are thrilled to have returned to their original bodies. Mitch gets breakfast with Sabrina, not realizing there is a tattoo of Dave's face on his back, captioned "I ♥ Dave.” Mitch speaks at his father's wedding and attends Dave's anniversary party. In a post-credits scene, Dave and Jamie get high and visit the aquarium, while Mitch and Sabrina have sex for the first time, and Mitch sends Dave the lorno he starred in.

== Cast ==
- Ryan Reynolds as Mitchell "Mitch" Planko Jr.
- Jason Bateman as David "Dave" Lockwood
- Leslie Mann as Jamie Lockwood, Dave's wife
- Olivia Wilde as Sabrina McKay, Dave's beautiful associate
- Alan Arkin as Mitchell "Mitch" Planko Sr., Mitch's father and namesake
- Mircea Monroe as Tatiana, Mitch's nymphomaniac ex-girlfriend
- Gregory Itzin as Flemming Steel, Dave's boss
- Ned Schmidtke as Theodore "Teddy" "Ted" Norton
- Dax Griffin as Blow-Dried Goon
- Craig Bierko as Valtan
- Taaffe O'Connell as Mona
- Fred Stoller as Movie Set PA
- T. J. Hassan as Kato

In addition, Sydney Rouviere and Lauren and Luke Bain portray Dave and Jamie's three children, Cara, Sarah, and Peter, respectively.

== Reception ==
On Rotten Tomatoes, The Change-Up has an approval rating of 26% based on 157 reviews, and an average rating of 4.7/10. The site's critical consensus reads, "There's a certain amount of fun to be had from watching Bateman and Reynolds play against type, but it isn't enough to carry The Change-Up through its crude humor and formulaic plot." On Metacritic, the film has a score of 39 out of 100 based on 35 critics, indicating "generally unfavorable reviews". Audiences polled by CinemaScore gave the film an average grade of "B" on an A+ to F scale.

British newspaper The Telegraph named The Change-Up one of the ten worst films of 2011, saying "Ryan Reynolds and Jason Bateman have skill, charm, timing – everything but the right script."

On its opening weekend, The Change-Up opened at #4, grossing $13,531,115 in 2,913 theaters with a $4,645 average. The film grossed $37.1 million in North America and $38.4 million in other territories for a worldwide total of $75.5 million against a budget of $52 million.

== See also ==
- The Hot Chick (2002)
- Trading Places (1983)
- Multiplicity (1996)
- Freaky Friday (2003)
