= Jon Lucas =

American screenwriter and director

- Born: Jonathan Lucas; October 29, 1975 (age 50); Summit, New Jersey, U.S.
- Education: Yale University
- Occupations: Director, Screenwriter
- Writing career
- Notable works: The Hangover (2009); The Change-Up (2011)

Jonathan Lucas (born October 29, 1975) is an American film director and screenwriter. He is best known for his collaborative work with Scott Moore, which includes The Hangover, 21 & Over and Bad Moms.

== Life and career ==
He is a graduate of Yale University as well as an alumnus of Pingry School. He started working as an assistant for screenwriter Daniel Petrie, Jr. in the '90s along with Scott Moore, who would become his longtime writing partner.

The first script Lucas and Moore ever wrote together was Flypaper, although the movie didn't get made until 2011. In addition, they both worked on providing uncredited rewrites on Wedding Crashers, 27 Dresses, Chicken Little, Monster-in-Law, and Mr. Woodcock.

In 2005 and 2007, they were hired to write the screenplays for the family comedies Rebound and Full of It. They also participated on the screenplay for the holiday comedy Four Christmases in 2008. The following year, they wrote the successful romantic comedy Ghosts of Girlfriends Past. However, their breakthrough success came with The Hangover, which became the highest-grossing R-rated comedy in the United States at the time. The movie spawned two sequels but did not include involvement by Lucas and Moore. Due to the success of The Hangover, the duo penned another R-rated comedy: the 2011 film, The Change-Up.

In 2013, Lucas and Moore made their co-directorial debuts with the comedy film, 21 & Over. In October 2012, they sold to ABC a pilot for a new comedy show named Mixology, which follows five guys and five girls "trying to find love at a trendy Manhattan bar," all over the course of a single night. The show was picked up to series in May 2013 and premiered on ABC on February 26, 2014, but was cancelled after only one season.

== Filmography ==
Year	Title	Director	Writer	Notes
2001	Rustin	No	Yes	Screenplay from a story by director Rick Johnson
2005	Chicken Little	No	Yes	Uncredited rewrite, special thanks
2005	Rebound	No	Yes	
2007	Full of It	No	Yes	
2008	Four Christmases	No	Yes	
2009	Ghosts of Girlfriends Past	No	Yes	
2009	The Hangover	No	Yes	Nominated - BAFTA Award for Best Original Screenplay
2011	Flypaper	No	Yes	
2011	The Change-Up	No	Yes	
2013	21 & Over	Yes	Yes	Directorial debut
2016	Bad Moms	Yes	Yes	People's Choice Award for Best Comedy
2016	Office Christmas Party	No	Story	
2017	A Bad Moms Christmas	Yes	Yes	
2019	Jexi	Yes	Yes	
2026	Spa Weekend	Yes	Yes	

== Television credits ==
- 2014: Mixology (co-creator)
