= Scott Moore (filmmaker) =

American screenwriter and film director

- Born: Honolulu, Hawaii, U.S.
- Education: University of Colorado Boulder
- Occupations: Screenwriter, Film director
- Writing career
- Notable works: The Hangover (2009); Bad Moms (2016)

Scott Moore is an American screenwriter and film director.

== Early life ==
Scott Moore was born and raised in Honolulu, Hawaii and is an alumnus of Punahou School and the University of Colorado Boulder.

== Career ==
Moore is one of the writers of The Hangover, one of the highest grossing R-rated comedies of all-time. He works with longtime writing partner Jon Lucas. They were nominated for Best Original Screenplay in 2009 by both the British Academy of Film and Television Arts (BAFTA) and the Writers Guild of America (WGA).

With Jon Lucas, Moore wrote and directed the comedy film 21 & Over, which was their directorial debut.

In October 2012, they sold to ABC a pilot for a new comedy show named Mixology, which follows five guys and five girls "trying to find love at a trendy Manhattan bar," all over the course of a single night. The show ran for 13 episodes.

In 2016 they wrote and directed Bad Moms, which became a surprise hit, grossing over $180 million worldwide and winning the People's Choice Award for Best Comedy. It was successful enough to spawn a sequel, A Bad Moms Christmas, which was also financially successful.

== Works ==
Year	Film	Director	Writer	Notes
2005	Chicken Little	No	Yes	Uncredited rewrite, special thanks
2005	Wedding Crashers	No	Yes	Uncredited rewrite
2005	Rebound	No	Yes	
2007	Full of It	No	Yes	
2008	Four Christmases	No	Yes	
2009	Ghosts of Girlfriends Past	No	Yes	
2009	The Hangover	No	Yes	Nominated - BAFTA Award for Best Original Screenplay
2011	Flypaper	No	Yes	
2011	The Change-Up	No	Yes	
2013	21 & Over	Yes	Yes	Directorial debut
2016	Bad Moms	Yes	Yes	People's Choice Award for Best Comedy
2016	Office Christmas Party	No	Story	
2017	A Bad Moms Christmas	Yes	Yes	
2019	Jexi	Yes	Yes	
2026	Spa Weekend	Yes	Yes	
