= List of American comedy films =

This is a list of American comedy films.

Comedy films are separated into two categories: short films and feature films. Any film over 40 minutes long is considered to be of feature-length (although most feature films produced since 1950 are considerably longer, those made in earlier eras frequently ranged from little more than an hour to as little as four reels, which amounted to about 44 minutes).

== Short comedy films ==
=== 1890s ===
==== 1894 ====
- Fred Ott's Sneeze

==== 1897 ====
- The Milker's Mishap
- New Pillow Fight
- Young America

==== 1898 ====
- The Dude's Experience with a Girl on a Tandem
- A Narrow Escape
- The Nearsighted School Teacher

=== 1900s ===
==== 1900 ====
- Above the Limit
- Clowns Spinning Hats
- The Enchanted Drawing

==== 1901 ====
- Another Job for the Undertaker
- Boxing in Barrels
- What Happened on Twenty-third Street, New York City

==== 1905 ====
- Everybody Works but Father
- The Little Train Robbery

==== 1906 ====
- Humorous Phases of Funny Faces

==== 1907 ====
- College Chums

==== 1908 ====
- Balked at the Altar
- A Calamitous Elopement
- The Taming of the Shrew
- The Thieving Hand

==== 1909 ====
- Ben's Kid
- The Curtain Pole
- Making It Pleasant for Him
- Mr. Flip
- Mrs. Jones' Birthday
- Those Awful Hats

=== 1910s ===
==== 1910 ====
- Davy Jones and Captain Bragg, directed by George D. Baker

==== 1911 ====
- Money to Burn, by Edwin S. Porter

==== 1912 ====
- Making a Man of Her, directed by Al Christie
- A Near-Tragedy, directed by Mack Sennett
- The New Neighbor, directed by Mack Sennett
- O'Brien's Busy Day, directed by Otis Turner

==== 1914 ====
- Between Showers
- A Busy Day
- Kid Auto Races at Venice
- Cruel, Cruel Love
- A Film Johnnie
- The Good for Nothing
- Recreation
- The Knockout
- Between Showers
- Making a Living
- The New Janitor
- Twenty Minutes of Love

==== 1915 ====
- A Night Out
- Fatty's Tintype Tangle
- A Night in the Show
- Ragtime Snap Shots
- The Tramp
- A Woman

==== 1916 ====
- American Aristocracy
- Behind the Screen
- The Fireman
- The Floorwalker
- The Mystery of the Leaping Fish
- The Pawnshop
- The Vagabond

==== 1917 ====
- The Adventurer
- Back Stage
- Easy Street
- The Immigrant

==== 1918 ====
- Triple Trouble
- The Cook
- Fireman Save My Child
- Good Night, Nurse!

==== 1919 ====
- A Day's Pleasure
- Sunnyside
- Back Stage
- The Hayseed
- Hoot Mon!, directed by Hal Roach, starring Stan Laurel
- Hustling for Health

=== 1920s ===
==== 1920 ====
- The Garage
- One Week

==== 1921 ====
- Among Those Present
- The Goat
- The Idle Class
- The Lucky Dog
- Never Weaken
- Now or Never

==== 1922 ====
- Cops
- Mixed Nuts
- Mud and Sand
- Our Gang - a long-running series of short films which began that year
- Pay Day

==== 1923 ====
- The Balloonatic
- Dogs of War
- Gas and Air
- Kill or Cure
- The Love Nest
- The Pilgrim

==== 1924 ====
- Mother, Mother, Mother Pin a Rose on Me
- Sherlock Jr.
- Why Men Work

==== 1925 ====
- Dr. Pyckle and Mr. Pryde
- Seven Chances

==== 1926 ====
- Bromo and Juliet
- Crazy like a Fox
- Dog Shy
- Mighty Like a Moose
- My Old Kentucky Home
- The Strong Man
- Tramp, Tramp, Tramp

==== 1927 ====
- Do Detectives Think?
- Fluttering Hearts
- Hats Off
- His First Flame
- Long Pants
- Love 'em and Weep
- The General

==== 1928 ====
- The Gallopin' Gaucho
- Pass the Gravy
- Plane Crazy
- Steamboat Willie
- Two Tars
- You're Darn Tootin'

==== 1929 ====
- Big Business
- Lambchops
- Unaccustomed As We Are

=== 1930s ===
==== 1930 ====
- Shivering Shakespeare
- Teacher's Pet

==== 1931 ====
- Beau Hunks
- Chickens Come Home
- Helpmates
- The House That Shadows Built
- Our Wife

==== 1932 ====
- County Hospital
- The Music Box

==== 1933 ====
- Busy Bodies
- The Midnight Patrol
- Twice Two

==== 1934 ====
- Going Bye-Bye!
- Odor in the Court
- Punch Drunks
- Woman Haters

==== 1935 ====
- Pop Goes the Easel
- Thicker than Water
- Tit for Tat

==== 1936 ====
- Movie Maniacs

==== 1938 ====
- Termites of 1938

==== 1940 ====
- The Heckler
- The New Pupil

== Feature-length films ==
=== 1910s ===
==== 1914 ====
- Brewster's Millions
- Tillie's Punctured Romance

==== 1916 ====
- The Habit of Happiness
- The Traveling Salesman

==== 1917 ====
- An Aerial Joy Ride
- The Poor Little Rich Girl
- Rebecca of Sunnybrook Farm

==== 1918 ====
- All Night
- Amarilly of Clothes-Line Alley
- Fair Enough
- Shoulder Arms

==== 1919 ====
- The Adventure Shop
- After His Own Heart
- Daddy-Long-Legs
- The Hoodlum

=== 1920s ===
==== 1920 ====
- Easy to Get
- Life of the Party
- Pollyanna
- The Round-Up
- The Saphead
- Suds

==== 1921 ====
- Brewster's Millions
- Crazy to Marry
- The Dollar-a-Year Man
- Eden and Return
- The Fast Freight or Freight Prepaid or Via Fast Freight
- Gasoline Gus
- The Girl in the Taxi
- Humor Risk
- The Kid
- Leap Year
- A Sailor-Made Man
- The Traveling Salesman

==== 1922 ====
- Don't Get Personal
- Dr. Jack
- Gay and Devilish
- Grandma's Boy
- The Ladder Jinx
- Red Hot Romance
- Up and at 'Em

==== 1923 ====
- The Near Lady
- Our Hospitality
- Safety Last!
- Souls for Sale
- Three Ages
- Why Worry?

==== 1924 ====
- Girl Shy
- Happiness
- Hot Water
- The Last Man on Earth
- Lover's Lane
- The Navigator

==== 1925 ====
- The Eagle
- The Freshman
- The Gold Rush

==== 1926 ====
- For Heaven's Sake
- The General
- The Strong Man
- Tramp, Tramp, Tramp

==== 1927 ====
- Fireman, Save My Child
- His First Flame
- The Kid Brother
- Long Pants
- Three's a Crowd

==== 1928 ====
- The Circus
- A Girl in Every Port
- The Matinee Idol
- Show People
- Speedy
- Steamboat Bill, Jr.

==== 1929 ====
- The Cocoanuts
- The Hollywood Revue of 1929
- Jazz Heaven
- Navy Blues
- Rio Rita
- Street Girl
- Tanned Legs
- The Vagabond Lover
- The Very Idea
- Welcome Danger
- The Wild Party
- Words and Music

=== 1930s ===
==== 1930 ====
- Animal Crackers
- Check and Double Check
- The Cuckoos
- Dixiana
- Feet First
- Half Shot at Sunrise
- He Knew Women
- Hook, Line & Sinker
- Leathernecking
- Lovin' the Ladies
- Queen High
- The Rogue Song
- The Runaway Bride
- She's My Weakness
- Sin Takes a Holiday
- Whoopee!
- A Woman Commands

==== 1931 ====
- Bachelor Apartment
- The Big Shot
- Caught Plastered
- City Lights
- Cracked Nuts
- Everything's Rosie
- Fanny Foley Herself
- The Front Page
- Girls Demand Excitement
- High Stakes
- Laugh and Get Rich
- Lonely Wives
- Monkey Business
- Pardon Us
- Peach O'Reno
- Platinum Blonde
- The Royal Bed
- The Runaround
- Sweepstakes
- The Tip-Off
- Too Many Cooks
- White Shoulders

==== 1932 ====
- The Animal Kingdom
- Fireman, Save My Child
- Girl Crazy
- The Half-Naked Truth
- Hold 'Em Jail
- Horse Feathers
- Ladies of the Jury
- Lady with a Past
- Little Orphan Annie
- Love Me Tonight
- Million Dollar Legs
- Movie Crazy
- Pack Up Your Troubles
- The Penguin Pool Murder
- That's My Boy
- This Is the Night

==== 1933 ====
- Bed of Roses
- Blind Adventure
- Bombshell
- Christopher Bean
- The Devil's Brother
- Dinner at Eight
- Diplomaniacs
- Duck Soup
- Flying Down to Rio
- Goldie Gets Along
- Goodbye Love
- His Private Secretary
- I'm No Angel
- International House
- It's Great to Be Alive
- Melody Cruise
- Our Betters
- Professional Sweetheart
- Rafter Romance
- Sailor Be Good
- She Done Him Wrong
- So This Is Africa
- Sons of the Desert
- Topaze

==== 1934 ====
- The Affairs of Cellini
- Babes in Toyland
- Bachelor Bait
- By Your Leave
- The Cat's-Paw
- Cockeyed Cavaliers
- The Dover Road
- Down to Their Last Yacht
- The Gay Divorcee
- Hips, Hips, Hooray!
- It Happened One Night
- It's a Gift
- Kentucky Kernels
- Lightning Strikes Twice
- The Meanest Gal in Town
- The Richest Girl in the World
- Sing and Like It
- Strictly Dynamite
- The Thin Man
- We're Rich Again

==== 1935 ====
- Another Face
- Bonnie Scotland
- Captain Hurricane
- Enchanted April
- The Farmer Takes a Wife
- Hi, Gaucho!
- His Family Tree
- Hooray for Love
- Hot Tip
- I Dream Too Much
- In Person
- Laddie
- A Night at the Opera
- The Nitwits
- Paradise Canyon
- The Rainmakers
- Romance in Manhattan
- Ruggles of Red Gap
- Star of Midnight
- To Beat the Band
- Top Hat

==== 1936 ====
- The Bohemian Girl
- The Bride Walks Out
- Bunker Bean
- Dancing Pirate
- The Ex-Mrs. Bradford
- The Farmer in the Dell
- Follow the Fleet
- Libeled Lady
- Love on a Bet
- Make Way for a Lady
- The Milky Way
- Modern Times
- Mr. Deeds Goes to Town
- Mummy's Boys
- My Man Godfrey
- Our Relations
- Silly Billies
- Smartest Girl in Town
- Swing Time
- Sylvia Scarlett
- Theodora Goes Wild
- Three Men on a Horse
- Walking on Air
- Wife vs. Secretary

==== 1937 ====
- All Over Town
- The Awful Truth
- The Big Shot
- Breakfast for Two
- A Damsel in Distress
- A Day at the Races
- Don't Tell the Wife
- Double Wedding
- Fight for Your Lady
- Fit for a King
- Forty Naughty Girls
- Hideaway
- High Flyers
- History Is Made At Night
- Hitting a New High
- The King and the Chorus Girl
- The Life of the Party
- Make a Wish
- Meet the Missus
- Music for Madame
- New Faces of 1937
- Nothing Sacred
- On Again-Off Again
- Quick Money
- Riding on Air
- Shall We Dance
- She's Got Everything
- Super-Sleuth
- That Girl from Paris
- There Goes the Groom
- There Goes My Girl
- They Wanted to Marry
- Too Many Wives
- Topper
- Way Out West
- We're on the Jury
- When's Your Birthday?
- Wise Girl
- You Can't Beat Love

==== 1938 ====
- The Affairs of Annabel
- The Amazing Dr. Clitterhouse
- Annabel Takes a Tour
- Block-Heads
- Blond Cheat
- Bringing Up Baby
- Carefree
- Crashing Hollywood
- Everybody's Doing It
- Go Chase Yourself
- Having Wonderful Time
- Joy of Living
- Love Finds Andy Hardy
- The Mad Miss Manton
- Maid's Night Out
- Mr. Doodle Kicks Off
- Next Time I Marry
- Night Spot
- Peck's Bad Boy with the Circus
- Professor Beware
- Radio City Revels
- Room Service
- A Slight Case of Murder
- Swiss Miss
- This Marriage Business
- Vivacious Lady
- You Can't Take It with You

==== 1939 ====
- At the Circus
- Bachelor Mother
- A Chump at Oxford
- The Cowboy Quarterback
- Dancing Co-Ed
- East Side of Heaven
- Escape to Paradise
- Fifth Avenue Girl
- The Flying Deuces
- The Girl from Mexico
- Honolulu
- It's a Wonderful World
- Mr. Smith Goes to Washington
- Ninotchka
- Topper Takes a Trip
- The Women

=== 1940s ===
==== 1940 ====
- Alias the Deacon
- Always a Bride
- American Matchmaker
- Andy Hardy Meets Debutante
- An Angel from Texas
- Arise, My Love
- The Bank Dick
- Blondie Has Servant Trouble
- Blondie on a Budget
- Blondie Plays Cupid
- Boys of the City
- Brother Orchid
- Brother Rat and a Baby
- Buck Benny Rides Again
- Calling All Husbands
- The Captain Is a Lady
- Chasing Trouble
- A Chump at Oxford
- Comin' Round the Mountain
- Comrade X
- Congo Maisie
- Cross-Country Romance
- Curtain Call
- Dance, Girl, Dance
- The Doctor Takes a Wife
- Dreaming Out Loud
- Dulcy
- Earl of Puddlestone
- East Side Kids
- The Farmer's Daughter
- Five Little Peppers at Home
- Five Little Peppers in Trouble
- Friendly Neighbors
- The Ghost Breakers
- The Ghost Comes Home
- Girl from Avenue A
- The Golden Fleecing
- Go West
- Grand Ole Opry
- Grandpa Goes to Town
- Granny Get Your Gun
- The Great Dictator
- The Great McGinty
- The Great Profile
- He Married His Wife
- He Stayed for Breakfast
- High School
- Hired Wife
- His Girl Friday
- Hold That Woman!
- Hullabaloo
- I Can't Give You Anything But Love, Baby
- I Love You Again
- In Old Missouri
- The Invisible Woman
- It All Came True
- La Conga Nights
- Ladies Must Live
- The Lady in Question
- The Leather Pushers
- Li'l Abner
- Little Nellie Kelly
- Little Orvie
- Love, Honor and Oh-Baby!
- Love Thy Neighbor
- Lucky Partners
- Ma! He's Making Eyes at Me
- Maisie Was a Lady
- Margie
- Meet the Missus
- Mexican Spitfire
- Mexican Spitfire Out West
- Millionaire Playboy
- Misbehaving Husbands
- My Favorite Wife
- My Little Chickadee
- No, No, Nanette
- No Time for Comedy
- Oh Johnny, How You Can Love
- One Night in the Tropics
- On the Spot
- Opened by Mistake
- The Philadelphia Story
- Pop Always Pays
- Private Affairs
- Public Deb No. 1
- The Quarterback
- Rhythm on the River
- Road to Singapore
- Sailor's Lady
- Sandy Gets Her Man
- Sandy Is a Lady
- Saps at Sea
- Scatterbrain
- Second Chorus
- Seventeen
- She Couldn't Say No
- Slightly Tempted
- The Shop Around the Corner
- So You Won't Talk
- Son of the Navy
- Spring Parade
- Susan and God
- That Gang of Mine
- Third Finger, Left Hand
- This Thing Called Love
- Those Were the Days!
- Three Cheers for the Irish
- Too Many Girls
- Too Many Husbands
- Up in the Air
- Village Barn Dance
- The Villain Still Pursued Her
- You Can't Fool Your Wife
- You'll Find Out

==== 1941 ====
- Affectionately Yours
- Andy Hardy's Private Secretary
- Angels with Broken Wings
- Appointment for Love
- Bachelor Daddy
- Ball of Fire
- Barnacle Bill
- Bedtime Story
- The Big Store
- Blonde Inspiration
- Blondie Goes Latin
- Blondie in Society
- The Body Disappears
- Bowery Blitzkrieg
- The Bride Came C.O.D.
- The Bride Wore Crutches
- Broadway Limited
- Buck Privates
- Buy Me That Town
- Cadet Girl
- Caught in the Act
- Caught in the Draft
- Charley's Aunt
- Come Live with Me
- Country Fair
- The Cowboy and the Blonde
- Cracked Nuts
- Design for Scandal
- The Devil and Miss Jones
- Double Date
- Double Trouble
- Father Takes a Wife
- Father Steps Out
- The Feminine Touch
- The Flame of New Orleans
- Footlight Fever
- For Beauty's Sake
- Free and Easy
- The Gay Vagabond
- A Girl, a Guy and a Gob
- Glamour Boy
- Golden Hoofs
- Go West, Young Lady
- Great Guns
- The Great American Broadcast
- The Great Mr. Nobody
- The Hard-Boiled Canary
- Harvard, Here I Come
- Hello, Sucker
- Hellzapoppin'
- Henry Aldrich for President
- Here Comes Happiness
- Here Comes Mr. Jordan
- Her First Beau
- Hit the Road
- Hold That Ghost
- Honeymoon for Three
- Honolulu Lu
- Hurry, Charlie, Hurry
- Ice-Capades
- In the Navy
- Keep 'Em Flying
- King of the Zombies
- Kiss the Boys Goodbye
- Kisses for Breakfast
- The Lady Eve
- Las Vegas Nights
- Let's Go Collegiate
- Life with Henry
- Look Who's Laughing
- Louisiana Purchase
- Love Crazy
- Married Bachelor
- Marry the Boss's Daughter
- Maisie Was a Lady
- Meet John Doe
- Meet the Chump
- Melody Lane
- The Mexican Spitfire's Baby
- Million Dollar Baby
- Miss Polly
- Mob Town
- Model Wife
- Moon Over Her Shoulder
- Moon Over Miami
- Mountain Moonlight
- Mr. Celebrity
- Mr. & Mrs. Smith
- My Life with Caroline
- Navy Blues
- Never Give a Sucker an Even Break
- New York Town
- Niagara Falls
- Nothing but the Truth
- Our Wife
- The Perfect Snob
- Petticoat Politics
- Play Girl
- Playmates
- Public Enemies
- Puddin' Head
- Reaching for the Sun
- Redhead
- Reg'lar Fellers
- The Reluctant Dragon
- Repent at Leisure
- The Richest Man in Town
- Ringside Maisie
- Rise and Shine
- Road to Zanzibar
- Sailors on Leave
- Scattergood Baines
- Scattergood Meets Broadway
- Scattergood Pulls the Strings
- She Knew All the Answers
- Sing Another Chorus
- Sis Hopkins
- Six Lessons from Madame La Zonga
- Skylark
- The Smiling Ghost
- Spooks Run Wild
- The Strawberry Blonde
- The Stork Pays Off
- Sullivan's Travels
- Tall, Dark and Handsome
- Tanks a Million
- That Uncertain Feeling
- Thieves Fall Out
- Three Girls About Town
- Three Sons o' Guns
- Tight Shoes
- Tillie the Toiler
- Time Out for Rhythm
- Tom, Dick and Harry
- Too Many Blondes
- Top Sergeant Mulligan
- Topper Returns
- Two-Faced Woman
- Two in a Taxi
- Two Latins from Manhattan
- Uncle Joe
- Unexpected Uncle
- Unfinished Business
- A Very Young Lady
- Week-End in Havana
- Week-End for Three
- West Point Widow
- When Ladies Meet
- Where Did You Get That Girl?
- Whistling in the Dark
- The Wild Man of Borneo
- World Premiere
- You Belong to Me
- You'll Never Get Rich
- You're in the Army Now
- You're the One

==== 1942 ====
- A-Haunting We Will Go
- Almost Married
- Andy Hardy's Double Life
- Are Husbands Necessary?
- Baby Face Morgan
- The Bashful Bachelor
- Behind the Eight Ball
- Blondie's Blessed Event
- Blondie Goes to College
- Blondie for Victory
- The Boogie Man Will Get You
- Brooklyn Orchid
- Butch Minds the Baby
- Cairo
- Call Out the Marines
- Careful, Soft Shoulders
- The Courtship of Andy Hardy
- Daring Young Man
- Don't Get Personal
- Duke of the Navy
- Fall In
- Footlight Serenade
- Freckles Comes Home
- A Gentleman at Heart
- George Washington Slept Here
- Get Hep to Love
- Girl Trouble
- The Great Gildersleeve
- Hay Foot
- Hello, Annapolis
- Henry Aldrich, Editor
- Henry and Dizzy
- Her Cardboard Lover
- Here We Go Again
- Hi, Neighbor
- Highways by Night
- Hillbilly Blitzkrieg
- House of Errors
- I Married a Witch
- Ice-Capades Revue
- Inside the Law
- It Happened in Flatbush
- Jail House Blues
- Joan of Ozark
- Johnny Doughboy
- Juke Box Jenny
- The Lady Has Plans
- Lady in a Jam
- The Lady Is Willing
- Larceny, Inc.
- Laugh Your Blues Away
- Let's Get Tough!
- Lucky Ghost
- Lucky Jordan
- Lucky Legs
- The Mad Martindales
- The Magnificent Dope
- The Major and the Minor
- The Male Animal
- The Man in the Trunk
- The Man Who Came to Dinner
- Maisie Gets Her Man
- The McGuerins from Brooklyn
- Mexican Spitfire at Sea
- Mexican Spitfire Sees a Ghost
- Mexican Spitfire's Elephant
- Moonlight Masquerade
- Mr. Wise Guy
- Mrs. Wiggs of the Cabbage Patch
- My Favorite Blonde
- My Favorite Spy
- My Heart Belongs to Daddy
- My Sister Eileen
- 'Neath Brooklyn Bridge
- The Night Before the Divorce
- A Night to Remember
- Obliging Young Lady
- The Old Homestead
- Once Upon a Honeymoon
- One Thrilling Night
- Over My Dead Body
- The Palm Beach Story
- Pardon My Sarong
- Pardon My Stripes
- The Postman Didn't Ring
- Private Snuffy Smith
- Ride 'Em Cowboy
- Right to the Heart
- Rings on Her Fingers
- Rio Rita
- Road to Morocco
- Roxie Hart
- Scattergood Rides High
- Scattergood Survives a Murder
- Seven Days' Leave
- She's in the Army
- Shepherd of the Ozarks
- Ship Ahoy
- Shut My Big Mouth
- Sleepytime Gal
- Small Town Deb
- Smart Alecks
- So's Your Aunt Emma
- Sunday Punch
- Sweetheart of the Fleet
- Take a Letter, Darling
- Tales of Manhattan
- The Talk of the Town
- That Other Woman
- There's One Born Every Minute
- They All Kissed the Bride
- This Time for Keeps
- Tish
- To Be or Not to Be
- Too Many Women
- Tortilla Flat
- A Tragedy at Midnight
- Tramp, Tramp, Tramp
- Twin Beds
- Two Yanks in Trinidad
- We Were Dancing
- Whispering Ghosts
- Whistling in Dixie
- Who Done It?
- The Wife Takes a Flyer
- Woman of the Year
- Yokel Boy
- You Were Never Lovelier
- You're Telling Me
- Youth on Parade

==== 1943 ====
- The Adventures of a Rookie
- Air Raid Wardens
- All by Myself
- The Amazing Mrs. Holliday
- Around the World
- Best Foot Forward
- Chatterbox
- Clancy Street Boys
- Claudia
- Cowboy in Manhattan
- Crazy House
- The Crystal Ball
- The Dancing Masters
- Danger! Women at Work
- Dixie Dugan
- DuBarry Was a Lady
- Fired Wife
- Footlight Glamour
- Gals, Incorporated
- Get Going
- The Ghost and the Guest
- Ghosts on the Loose
- Gildersleeve's Bad Day
- Gildersleeve on Broadway
- The Girl from Monterrey
- The Good Fellows
- Good Morning, Judge
- Government Girl
- Happy Go Lucky
- Heaven Can Wait
- He Hired the Boss
- Hello, Frisco, Hello
- He Hired the Boss
- Henry Aldrich Haunts a House
- Henry Aldrich Swings It
- Here Comes Elmer
- Here Comes Kelly
- Hi Diddle Diddle
- Hi'ya, Chum
- Hi'ya, Sailor
- Hit the Ice
- Holy Matrimony
- Hoosier Holiday
- I Dood It
- It Ain't Hay
- It's a Great Life
- Jitterbugs
- Keep 'Em Slugging
- Kid Dynamite
- Ladies' Day
- Lady Bodyguard
- Lady of Burlesque
- A Lady Takes a Chance
- Let's Face It
- The Meanest Man in the World
- Mexican Spitfire's Blessed Event
- The More the Merrier
- Mountain Rhythm
- Mr. Lucky
- Mr. Muggs Steps Out
- My Kingdom for a Cook
- Nearly Eighteen
- Never a Dull Moment
- No Time for Love
- Petticoat Larceny
- Pistol Packin' Mama
- The Powers Girl
- Princess O'Rourke
- Redhead from Manhattan
- Rhythm of the Islands
- Riding High
- Rookies in Burma
- Sarong Girl
- The Sky's the Limit
- Sleepy Lagoon
- Slightly Dangerous
- So This Is Washington
- So's Your Uncle
- A Stranger in Town
- The Sultan's Daughter
- Swing Shift Maisie
- Swing Your Partner
- Taxi, Mister
- That Nazty Nuisance
- They Got Me Covered
- Three Hearts for Julia
- Three Russian Girls
- Thousands Cheer
- Two Señoritas from Chicago
- Two Weeks to Live
- What a Woman!
- Whistling in Brooklyn
- Yanks Ahoy
- Young and Willing
- The Youngest Profession

==== 1944 ====
- Abroad with Two Yanks
- And the Angels Sing
- Andy Hardy's Blonde Trouble
- Arsenic and Old Lace
- Babes on Swing Street
- Barbary Coast Gent
- Beautiful but Broke
- Belle of the Yukon
- Block Busters
- Blonde Fever
- Bowery Champs
- Bowery to Broadway
- Brazil
- Bride by Mistake
- The Big Noise
- Call of the South Seas
- The Canterville Ghost
- Casanova Brown
- Casanova in Burlesque
- Chip Off the Old Block
- Crazy Knights
- Dancing in Manhattan
- Double Exposure
- The Doughgirls
- Ever Since Venus
- Follow the Boys
- Ghost Catchers
- The Ghost That Walks Alone
- Gildersleeve's Ghost
- Girl Rush
- Goin' to Town
- Going My Way
- Goodnight, Sweetheart
- The Great Mike
- Hail the Conquering Hero
- Hat Check Honey
- The Heavenly Body
- Henry Aldrich, Boy Scout
- Henry Aldrich Plays Cupid
- Henry Aldrich's Little Secret
- Her Primitive Man
- Here Come the Waves
- Hi, Beautiful
- Hi, Good Lookin'!
- Hollywood Canteen
- I'm from Arkansas
- The Impatient Years
- In Society
- It Happened Tomorrow
- Jamboree
- Janie
- Johnny Doesn't Live Here Anymore
- Leave It to the Irish
- Lost in a Harem
- Louisiana Hayride
- Maisie Goes to Reno
- Make Your Own Bed
- Marriage Is a Private Affair
- Meet the People
- The Merry Monahans
- Million Dollar Kid
- The Miracle of Morgan's Creek
- Moon Over Las Vegas
- Mr. Winkle Goes to War
- My Best Gal
- The National Barn Dance
- Nothing but Trouble
- Once Upon a Time
- One Body Too Many
- Our Hearts Were Young and Gay
- Practically Yours
- The Princess and the Pirate
- Rainbow Island
- Rationing
- Sailor's Holiday
- San Diego, I Love You
- See Here, Private Hargrove
- Sensations of 1945
- Seven Days Ashore
- Shadow of Suspicion
- Something for the Boys
- Song of the Open Road
- Standing Room Only
- Stars on Parade
- Swingtime Johnny
- Tahiti Nights
- Take It Big
- That's My Baby!
- This Is the Life
- Three Is a Family
- Three Little Sisters
- Three of a Kind
- The Thin Man Goes Home
- The Town Went Wild
- Trocadero
- Two Girls and a Sailor
- Up in Arms
- Up in Mabel's Room
- A WAVE, a WAC and a Marine
- Week-End Pass
- What a Man!
- You Can't Ration Love

==== 1945 ====
- Abbott and Costello in Hollywood
- The Affairs of Susan
- Along Came Jones
- An Angel Comes to Brooklyn
- Anchors Aweigh
- Bedside Manner
- The Big Show-Off
- Blonde from Brooklyn
- Brewster's Millions
- Bring on the Girls
- The Bullfighters
- The Captain from Köpenick
- Captain Tugboat Annie
- The Cheaters
- Christmas in Connecticut
- Come Out Fighting
- Docks of New York
- Doll Face
- Don Juan Quilligan
- Duffy's Tavern
- Eadie Was a Lady
- Easy to Look At
- Eve Knew Her Apples
- Follow That Woman
- The Gay Senorita
- G. I. Honeymoon
- Getting Gertie's Garter
- Guest Wife
- A Guy, a Gal and a Pal
- Having Wonderful Crime
- Here Come the Co-Eds
- Her Highness and the Bellboy
- Hit the Hay
- Hollywood and Vine
- Honeymoon Ahead
- The Horn Blows at Midnight
- How Doooo You Do!!!
- I Love a Bandleader
- I'll Remember April
- I'll Tell the World
- It's a Pleasure
- It's in the Bag!
- Lady on a Train
- Junior Miss
- The Kid Sister
- Kiss and Tell
- Leave It to Blondie
- Love, Honor and Goodbye
- Mama Loves Papa
- Man Alive
- Men in Her Diary
- Molly and Me
- Mr. Muggs Rides Again
- The Naughty Nineties
- Night Club Girl
- Out of This World
- Over 21
- Pardon My Past
- Penthouse Rhythm
- Pillow to Post
- Radio Stars on Parade
- Roughly Speaking
- A Royal Scandal
- The Sailor Takes a Wife
- Scared Stiff
- See My Lawyer
- Senorita from the West
- Shady Lady
- She Gets Her Man
- She Went to the Races
- She Wouldn't Say Yes
- Snafu
- Steppin' in Society
- The Stork Club
- Sunbonnet Sue
- That Night with You
- Ten Cents a Dance
- That Night with You
- That's the Spirit
- There Goes Kelly
- They Were Expendable
- Those Endearing Young Charms
- Trouble Chasers
- Twice Blessed
- Week-End at the Waldorf
- What a Blonde
- What Next, Corporal Hargrove?
- Where Do We Go from Here?
- Without Love
- Wonder Man
- You Came Along
- Zombies on Broadway

==== 1946 ====
- Abie's Irish Rose
- Affairs of Geraldine
- Angel on My Shoulder
- The Bachelor's Daughters
- Blondie Knows Best
- Blondie's Lucky Day
- Bowery Bombshell
- Breakfast in Hollywood
- The Bride Wore Boots
- Bringing Up Father
- Cluny Brown
- Colonel Effingham's Raid
- Cross My Heart
- Dangerous Business
- Ding Dong Williams
- The Fabulous Suzanne
- Easy to Wed
- Faithful in My Fashion
- Freddie Steps Out
- G.I. War Brides
- Gas House Kids
- Gay Blades
- Genius at Work
- The Gentleman Misbehaves
- The Green Years
- The Great Morgan
- Heartbeat
- Her Adventurous Night
- High School Hero
- Idea Girl
- In Fast Company
- It's Great to Be Young
- It Shouldn't Happen to a Dog
- Janie Gets Married
- Junior Prom
- The Kid from Brooklyn
- Lady Luck
- A Letter for Evie
- Little Giant
- Little Iodine
- Little Miss Big
- Live Wires
- Love Laughs at Andy Hardy
- Lover Come Back
- The Magnificent Rogue
- Margie
- Meet Me on Broadway
- Monsieur Beaucaire
- Mr. Hex
- Never Say Goodbye
- A Night in Casablanca
- Night in Paradise
- No Leave, No Love
- One Exciting Week
- One Way to Love
- Our Hearts Were Growing Up
- Partners in Time
- People Are Funny
- Rendezvous with Annie
- Riverboat Rhythm
- Road to Utopia
- The Runaround
- She Wrote the Book
- The Show-Off
- Singin' in the Corn
- Slightly Scandalous
- So Goes My Love
- Spook Busters
- Susie Steps Out
- Sweetheart of Sigma Chi
- Swing Parade of 1946
- Three Wise Fools
- The Time of Their Lives
- Two Guys from Milwaukee
- Up Goes Maisie
- Vacation in Reno
- The Well Groomed Bride
- White Tie and Tails
- Without Reservations
- Ziegfeld Follies

==== 1947 ====
- Always Together
- The Bachelor and the Bobby-Soxer (aka Bachelor Knight)
- The Bishop's Wife
- Blondie's Anniversary
- Blondie's Big Moment
- Blondie's Holiday
- Blondie in the Dough
- Bowery Buckaroos
- Buck Privates Come Home
- Christmas Eve
- Cigarette Girl
- Copacabana
- The Corpse Came C.O.D.
- Curley
- Cynthia
- Dear Ruth
- Easy Come, Easy Go
- The Egg and I
- The Fabulous Joe
- The Farmer's Daughter
- Fun on a Weekend
- Gas House Kids Go West
- The Gas House Kids "in Hollywood"
- The Ghost Goes Wild
- Hard Boiled Mahoney
- Heading for Heaven
- Her Husband's Affairs
- Honeymoon
- I'll Be Yours
- It Had to Be You
- It Happened in Brooklyn
- It Happened on 5th Avenue
- It's a Joke, Son!
- Joe Palooka in the Knockout
- Killer Dill
- Kilroy Was Here
- Ladies' Man
- The Late George Apley
- Life with Father
- Linda, Be Good
- Lost Honeymoon
- Love and Learn
- Magic Town
- Merton of the Movies
- Miracle on 34th Street
- Monsieur Verdoux
- My Brother Talks to Horses
- My Favorite Brunette
- News Hounds
- Out of the Blue
- The Perfect Marriage
- The Perils of Pauline
- The Pilgrim Lady
- Road to Rio
- Rose of Santa Rosa
- Sarge Goes to College
- The Secret Life of Walter Mitty
- The Senator Was Indiscreet
- The Sin of Harold Diddlebock
- Suddenly, It's Spring
- Sweet Genevieve
- That's My Gal
- That Way with Women
- The Trouble with Women
- Undercover Maisie
- Vacation Days
- The Voice of the Turtle
- Where There's Life
- When a Girl's Beautiful
- Where There's Life
- The Wistful Widow of Wagon Gap

==== 1948 ====
- Abbott and Costello Meet Frankenstein
- Alias a Gentleman
- Angels' Alley
- Apartment for Peggy
- Are You with It?
- Arthur Takes Over
- Blondie's Reward
- Blondie's Secret
- The Bride Goes Wild
- Campus Honeymoon
- Campus Sleuth
- The Countess of Monte Cristo
- Dream Girl
- The Dude Goes West
- The Emperor Waltz
- Every Girl Should Be Married
- Feudin', Fussin' and A-Fightin'
- A Foreign Affair
- For the Love of Mary
- French Leave
- The Fuller Brush Man
- The Gay Intruders
- The Girl from Manhattan
- Good Sam
- Here Comes Trouble
- If You Knew Susie
- An Innocent Affair
- The Inside Story
- Isn't It Romantic?
- Jiggs and Maggie in Court
- Jinx Money
- Julia Misbehaves
- June Bride
- Let's Live Again
- Let's Live a Little
- Lightnin' in the Forest
- Luxury Liner
- The Main Street Kid
- The Mating of Millie
- Mexican Hayride
- Mickey
- Mr. Blandings Builds His Dream House
- Mr. Peabody and the Mermaid
- Music Man
- My Dear Secretary
- No Minor Vices
- The Noose Hangs High
- On an Island with You
- One Sunday Afternoon
- On Touch of Venus
- On Our Merry Way
- The Paleface
- The Return of October
- The Sainted Sisters
- Scudda Hoo! Scudda Hay!
- Sitting Pretty
- Smugglers' Cove
- So This Is New York
- A Southern Yankee
- Strike It Rich
- That Wonderful Urge
- Two Guys from Texas
- The Time of Your Life
- Trouble Makers
- Unfaithfully Yours
- Variety Time
- Up in Central Park
- Wallflower
- Who Killed Doc Robbin
- You Gotta Stay Happy

==== 1949 ====
- Abbott and Costello Meet the Killer, Boris Karloff
- Adam's Rib
- Africa Screams
- Always Leave Them Laughing
- And Baby Makes Three
- And Baby Makes Three
- Angels in Disguise
- Blondie's Big Deal
- Blondie Hits the Jackpot
- Bride for Sale
- Chicken Every Sunday
- A Connecticut Yankee in King Arthur's Court
- Dancing in the Dark
- Dear Wife
- Everybody Does It
- Family Honeymoon
- The Fan
- Father Was a Fullback
- Fighting Fools
- Free for All
- The Girl from Jones Beach
- The Great Lover
- Hold That Baby!
- Holiday Affair
- Holiday in Havana
- The House Across the Street
- I Was a Male War Bride
- In the Good Old Summertime
- The Inspector General
- It Happens Every Spring
- It's a Great Feeling
- Jiggs and Maggie in Jackpot Jitters
- Joe Palooka in the Big Fight
- Joe Palooka in the Counterpunch
- John Loves Mary
- The Judge
- A Kiss for Corliss
- A Kiss in the Dark
- The Lady Takes a Sailor
- The Life of Riley
- The Lovable Cheat
- Love Happy
- The Lucky Stiff
- Ma and Pa Kettle
- Manhattan Angel
- Master Minds
- Miss Grant Takes Richmond
- Miss Mink of 1949
- Mother Is a Freshman
- Mr. Belvedere Goes to College
- My Dream Is Yours
- My Friend Irma
- Neptune's Daughter
- Once More, My Darling
- One Last Fling
- Red, Hot and Blue
- Shamrock Hill
- Slightly French
- Sorrowful Jones
- Tell It to the Judge
- Top o' the Morning
- Yes Sir, That's My Baby

=== 1950s ===
==== 1950 ====
- Abbott and Costello in the Foreign Legion
- The Admiral Was a Lady
- At War with the Army
- Belle of Old Mexico
- Beware of Blondie
- The Big Hangover
- Blonde Dynamite
- Born Yesterday
- Champagne for Caesar
- Cheaper by the Dozen
- Curtain Call at Cactus Creek
- Duchess of Idaho
- Emergency Wedding
- Fancy Pants
- Father Is a Bachelor
- Father of the Bride
- Father Makes Good
- Father's Wild Game
- Francis
- The Fuller Brush Girl
- The Goldbergs
- The Good Humor Man
- The Great Rupert
- The Happy Years
- Harvey
- He's a Cockeyed Wonder
- The Jackpot
- Jiggs and Maggie Out West
- Joe Palooka in Humphrey Takes a Chance
- Key to the City
- Kill the Umpire
- Let's Dance
- Louisa
- Love Happy
- Love That Brute
- Lucky Losers
- Ma and Pa Kettle Go to Town
- The Milkman
- Mrs. O'Malley and Mr. Malone
- My Friend Irma Goes West
- Never a Dull Moment
- Peggy
- The Petty Girl
- Please Believe Me
- Pretty Baby
- The Reformer and the Redhead
- The Skipper Surprised His Wife
- Stella
- The Traveling Saleswoman
- Tea for Two
- Two Weeks with Love
- Watch the Birdie
- The West Point Story
- When Willie Comes Marching Home
- A Woman of Distinction
- The Yellow Cab Man

==== 1951 ====
- Abbott and Costello Meet the Invisible Man
- An American in Paris
- Angels in the Outfield
- Bedtime for Bonzo
- Behave Yourself!
- Bowery Battalion
- As Young as You Feel
- Callaway Went Thataway
- Comin' Round the Mountain
- Corky of Gasoline Alley
- Crazy Over Horses
- Darling, How Could You!
- Dear Brat
- Double Dynamite
- Elopement
- Excuse My Dust
- Father Takes the Air
- Father's Little Dividend
- Francis Goes to the Races
- Gasoline Alley
- Ghost Chasers
- Gold Raiders
- Goodbye, My Fancy
- The Groom Wore Spurs
- Half Angel
- Havana Rose
- Honeychile
- Katie Did It
- The Lady from Texas
- Leave It to the Marines
- The Lemon Drop Kid
- Let's Go Navy!
- Let's Make It Legal
- Ma and Pa Kettle Back on the Farm
- The Mating Season
- A Millionaire for Christy
- The Model and the Marriage Broker
- Mr. Belvedere Rings the Bell
- My Favorite Spy
- Pardon My French
- Queen for a Day
- Sky High
- St. Benny the Dip
- Stop That Cab
- Strictly Dishonorable
- Sunny Side of the Street
- That's My Boy
- Three Husbands
- Too Young to Kiss
- Two Gals and a Guy
- Up Front
- Week-End with Father
- You Never Can Tell
- You're in the Navy Now

==== 1952 ====
- 3 for Bedroom C
- Abbott and Costello Meet Captain Kidd
- About Face
- Actor's and Sin
- Babes in Bagdad
- Back at the Front
- Bela Lugosi Meets a Brooklyn Gorilla
- The Belle of New York
- Belles on Their Toes
- Bonzo Goes to College
- Dreamboat
- The Fabulous Senorita
- Fearless Fagan
- Feudin' Fools
- Finders Keepers
- Francis Goes to West Point
- A Girl in Every Port
- Gobs and Gals
- Harem Girl
- Here Come the Marines
- Hold That Line
- It Grows on Trees
- Jack and the Beanstalk
- Jumping Jacks
- Just Across the Street
- Just This Once
- Limelight
- Lost in Alaska
- Love Island
- Ma and Pa Kettle at the Fair
- The Marrying Kind
- Monkey Business
- Mr. Walkie Talkie
- My Pal Gus
- My Wife's Best Friend
- No Holds Barred
- No Room for the Groom
- No Time for Flowers
- Oklahoma Annie
- One Big Affair
- Pat and Mike
- The Quiet Man
- Road to Bali
- Room for One More
- Sailor Beware
- Sally and Saint Anne
- She's Working Her Way Through College
- Singin' in the Rain
- Skirts Ahoy!
- Something for the Birds
- Son of Paleface
- Sound Off
- The Stooge
- Stop, You're Killing Me
- Tropical Heat Wave
- The WAC from Walla Walla
- We're Not Married!
- Young Man with Ideas

==== 1953 ====
- Abbott and Costello Go to Mars
- Abbott and Costello Meet Dr. Jekyll and Mr. Hyde
- The Affairs of Dobie Gillis
- The Band Wagon
- Beat the Devil
- The Caddy
- Confidentially Connie
- Dangerous When Wet
- Down Among the Sheltering Palms
- Dream Wife
- The Farmer Takes a Wife
- Fast Company
- Gentlemen Prefer Blondes
- The Girl Next Door
- The Girls of Pleasure Island
- Give a Girl a Break
- Here Come the Girls
- How to Marry a Millionaire
- It Happens Every Thursday
- Money from Home
- The Moon Is Blue
- Off Limits
- Remains to Be Seen
- Roman Holiday
- Scared Stiff
- Take Me to Town
- Trouble Along the Way
- Walking My Baby Back Home

==== 1954 ====
- 3 Ring Circus
- The Atomic Kid
- The Bowery Boys Meet the Monsters
- Casanova's Big Night
- Fireman, Save My Child
- Francis Joins the WACS
- The Great Diamond Robbery
- Her Twelve Men
- It Should Happen to You
- Jungle Gents
- Knock on Wood
- Living It Up
- The Long, Long Trailer
- Paris Playboys
- Phffft
- Ricochet Romance
- The Rocket Man
- Roogie's Bump
- Sabrina
- She Couldn't Say No
- Susan Slept Here
- Untamed Heiress

==== 1955 ====
- Abbott and Costello Meet the Keystone Kops
- Abbott and Costello Meet the Mummy
- Artists and Models
- The Girl Rush
- High Society
- How to Be Very, Very Popular
- Mister Roberts
- My Sister Eileen
- The Private War of Major Benson
- The Seven Little Foys
- The Seven Year Itch
- The Tender Trap
- The Trouble with Harry
- Three for the Show
- We're No Angels
- You're Never Too Young

==== 1956 ====
- Around the World in 80 Days
- The Birds and the Bees
- Bus Stop
- That Certain Feeling
- The Court Jester
- Dance with Me, Henry
- Forever, Darling
- The Girl Can't Help It
- High Society
- Hollywood or Bust
- The King and Four Queens
- The Lieutenant Wore Skirts
- Meet Me in Las Vegas
- The Opposite Sex
- Our Miss Brooks
- Pardners
- The Solid Gold Cadillac
- The Teahouse of the August Moon
- You Can't Run Away from It

==== 1957 ====
- The Delicate Delinquent
- Designing Woman
- Desk Set
- Don't Go Near the Water
- Funny Face
- The Girl Most Likely
- Joe Butterfly
- Love in the Afternoon
- Oh, Men! Oh, Women!
- Operation Mad Ball
- Pal Joey
- The Sad Sack
- Sayonara
- Silk Stockings
- Tammy and the Bachelor
- Ten Thousand Bedrooms
- Top Secret Affair
- Will Success Spoil Rock Hunter?

==== 1958 ====
- Andy Hardy Comes Home
- Auntie Mame
- Bell, Book and Candle
- The Geisha Boy
- Houseboat
- In the Money
- The Matchmaker
- Me and the Colonel
- Onionhead
- No Time for Sergeants
- Paris Holiday
- Rally Round the Flag, Boys!
- The Reluctant Debutante
- Rock-A-Bye Baby
- The Sheepman
- Teacher's Pet
- The Tunnel of Love
- This Happy Feeling

==== 1959 ====
- The 30 Foot Bride of Candy Rock
- 1001 Arabian Nights
- Alias Jesse James
- A Bucket of Blood
- But Not for Me
- Don't Give Up the Ship
- The Gazebo
- Gidget
- Have Rocket, Will Travel
- A Hole in the Head
- It Happened to Jane
- It Started with a Kiss
- Li'l Abner
- Operation Petticoat
- Pillow Talk
- Say One for Me
- The Shaggy Dog
- Some Like It Hot

=== 1960s ===
==== 1960 ====
- The Apartment
- The Bellboy
- Bells Are Ringing
- Cinderfella
- The Facts of Life
- G.I. Blues
- The Grass Is Greener
- It Started in Naples
- The Last Time I Saw Archie
- The Little Shop of Horrors
- North to Alaska
- Ocean's Eleven
- Pepe
- Please Don't Eat the Daisies
- Pollyanna
- Stop! Look! and Laugh!
- Tall Story
- Visit to a Small Planet
- The Wackiest Ship in the Army
- Wake Me When It's Over
- Where the Boys Are

==== 1961 ====
- The Absent-Minded Professor
- All Hands on Deck
- All in a Night's Work
- Bachelor in Paradise
- Blue Hawaii
- Breakfast at Tiffany's
- Come September
- Cry for Happy
- The Errand Boy
- Everything's Ducky
- Gidget Goes Hawaiian
- The Happy Thieves
- The Honeymoon Machine
- The Ladies Man
- The Last Time I Saw Archie
- Lover Come Back
- The Marriage-Go-Round
- Murder She Said
- Love in a Goldfish Bowl
- Lover Come Back
- A Majority of One
- The Marriage-Go-Round
- Murder She Said
- On the Double
- One Hundred and One Dalmatians
- One, Two, Three
- The Parent Trap
- The Pleasure of His Company
- Pocketful of Miracles
- Romanoff and Juliet
- Sail a Crooked Ship
- The Second Time Around
- The Sergeant Was a Lady
- Snow White and the Three Stooges
- Swingin' Along
- Tammy Tell Me True
- Teenage Millionaire
- The Two Little Bears
- The Wizard of Baghdad

==== 1962 ====
- 40 Pounds of Trouble
- Bachelor Flat
- The Bellboy and the Playgirls
- Bon Voyage!
- Boy's Night Out
- Follow That Dream
- Gay Purr-ee
- Gigot
- Girls! Girls! Girls!
- Hatari!
- The Horizontal Lieutenant
- If a Man Answers
- It Happened in Athens
- It's Only Money
- Moon Pilot
- Mr. Hobbs Takes a Vacation
- My Geisha
- The Notorious Landlady
- Paradise Alley
- Period of Adjustment
- The Pigeon That Took Rome
- The Road to Hong Kong
- Safe at Home!
- Saintly Sinners
- That Touch of Mink
- The Three Stooges in Orbit
- The Three Stooges Meet Hercules
- Tonight for Sure
- When the Girls Take Over
- Who's Got the Action?
- Zotz!

==== 1963 ====
- 4 for Texas
- Beach Party
- Bye Bye Birdie
- Call Me Bwana
- Charade
- Come Blow Your Horn
- The Courtship of Eddie's Father
- Critic's Choice
- Dime with a Halo
- Donovan's Reef
- Follow the Boys
- For Love or Money
- Fun in Acapulco
- Gidget Goes to Rome
- Irma la Douce
- Island of Love
- It Happened at the World's Fair
- It's a Mad, Mad, Mad, Mad World
- Love Is a Ball
- The Man from the Diners' Club
- Mary, Mary
- McLintock!
- Move Over, Darling
- A New Kind of Love
- The Nutty Professor
- Palm Springs Weekend
- Papa's Delicate Condition
- The Pink Panther
- The Prize
- Promises! Promises!
- Soldier in the Rain
- Son of Flubber
- Sunday in New York
- The Sword in the Stone
- Take Her, She's Mine
- Tammy and the Doctor
- The Three Stooges Go Around the World in a Daze
- The Thrill of It All
- A Ticklish Affair
- Under the Yum Yum Tree
- The Wheeler Dealers
- Who's Been Sleeping in My Bed?
- Who's Minding the Store?
- The Young Swingers

==== 1964 ====
- 3 Nuts in Search of a Bolt
- The Americanization of Emily
- Bedtime Story
- Bikini Beach
- The Brass Bottle
- Dear Heart
- Diary of a Bachelor
- The Disorderly Orderly
- Dr. Strangelove
- Ensign Pulver
- Father Goose
- For Those Who Think Young
- A Global Affair
- The Golden Head
- Good Neighbor Sam
- Goodbye Charlie
- A Hard Day's Night
- Hey There, It's Yogi Bear!
- Honeymoon Hotel
- I'd Rather Be Rich
- The Incredible Mr. Limpet
- Kiss Me, Stupid
- Kisses for My President
- Man's Favorite Sport?
- Mary Poppins
- McHale's Navy
- The Misadventures of Merlin Jones
- My Fair Lady
- Pajama Party
- The Patsy
- Quick, Let's Get Married
- Send Me No Flowers
- Sex and the Single Girl
- A Shot in the Dark
- The Unsinkable Molly Brown
- Viva Las Vegas
- What a Way to Go!
- The World of Henry Orient

==== 1965 ====
- The Art of Love
- Beach Ball
- Beach Blanket Bingo
- Billie
- Boeing Boeing
- Cat Ballou
- Clarence, the Cross-Eyed Lion
- Dear Brigitte
- Do Not Disturb
- Dr. Goldfoot and the Bikini Machine
- The Family Jewels
- That Funny Feeling
- The Girls on the Beach
- Goldstein
- The Great Race
- The Hallelujah Trail
- Harum Scarum
- Harvey Middleman, Fireman
- How to Murder Your Wife
- How to Stuff a Wild Bikini
- I'll Take Sweden
- John Goldfarb, Please Come Home!
- Lady L
- Love and Kisses
- The Loved One
- Marriage on the Rocks
- McHale's Navy Joins the Air Force
- The Monkey's Uncle
- Never Too Late
- One Way Wahine
- The Outlaws IS Coming
- Promise Her Anything
- The Rounders
- Sergeant Deadhead
- Situation Hopeless... But Not Serious
- Ski Party
- Spinout
- Strange Bedfellows
- A Swingin' Summer
- That Darn Cat!
- That Funny Feeling
- A Thousand Clowns
- Tickle Me
- A Very Special Favor
- What's New Pussycat?
- Wild on the Beach
- Winter A-Go-Go

==== 1966 ====
- After the Fox
- Any Wednesday
- A Big Hand for the Little Lady
- Birds Do It
- Blindfold
- Boy, Did I Get a Wrong Number!
- Don't Worry, We'll Think of a Title
- Dr. Goldfoot and the Girl Bombs
- Drop Dead Darling
- The Fat Spy
- A Fine Madness
- Fireball 500
- Follow Me, Boys!
- The Fortune Cookie
- Frankie and Johnny
- A Funny Thing Happened on the Way to the Forum
- Gambit
- The Ghost and Mr. Chicken
- The Glass Bottom Boat
- How to Steal a Million
- The Las Vegas Hillbillys
- The Last of the Secret Agents?
- Let's Kill Uncle
- Lord Love a Duck
- Made in Paris
- The Man Called Flintstone
- Munster, Go Home!
- Murderers' Row
- Not with My Wife, You Don't!
- Our Man Flint
- Out of Sight
- The Pad and How to Use It
- Paradise, Hawaiian Style
- Penelope
- The Russians Are Coming, the Russians Are Coming
- The Silencers
- Spinout
- Texas Across the River
- Three on a Couch
- The Trouble with Angels
- The Ugly Dachshund
- The Unkissed Bride
- Walk Don't Run
- Way...Way Out
- What Did You Do in the War, Daddy?
- What's Up, Tiger Lily?
- Wild Wild Winter
- You're a Big Boy Now

==== 1967 ====
- The Adventures of Bullwhip Griffin
- The Ambushers
- Barefoot in the Park
- The Ballad of Josie
- The Big Mouth
- Bikini Paradise
- The Busy Body
- The Caper of the Golden Bulls
- Caprice
- Casino Royale
- Catalina Caper
- David Holzman's Diary
- Divorce American Style
- Don't Make Waves
- Easy Come, Easy Go
- Eight on the Lam
- Enter Laughing
- The Fastest Guitar Alive
- Fitzwilly
- The Flim-Flam Man
- The Gnome-Mobile
- Good Times
- The Graduate
- The Gruesome Twosome
- Guess Who's Coming to Dinner
- The Happening
- How to Succeed in Business Without Really Trying
- In Like Flint
- It's a Bikini World
- The Jungle Book
- Luv
- Mars Needs Women
- Monkeys, Go Home!
- The Perils of Pauline
- The President's Analyst
- The Reluctant Astronaut
- Rosie!
- The Tiger Makes Out
- Three Bites of the Apple
- Who's Minding the Mint?

==== 1968 ====
- The Biggest Bundle of Them All
- Blackbeard's Ghost
- Buona Sera, Mrs. Campbell
- Bye Bye Braverman
- Candy
- Chitty Chitty Bang Bang
- Did You Hear the One About the Traveling Saleslady?
- Don't Just Stand There!
- Don't Raise the Bridge, Lower the River
- A Flea in Her Ear
- For Love of Ivy
- Funny Girl
- Greetings
- The Horse in the Gray Flannel Suit
- How Sweet It Is!
- How to Save a Marriage and Ruin Your Life
- The Impossible Years
- I Love You, Alice B. Toklas
- Live a Little, Love a Little
- Never a Dull Moment
- The Night They Raided Minsky's
- Nobody's Perfect
- The Odd Couple
- The One and Only, Genuine, Original Family Band
- Paper Lion
- The Party
- The Private Navy of Sgt. O'Farrell
- The Producers
- The Secret Life of an American Wife
- The Secret War of Harry Frigg
- The Shakiest Gun in the West
- Skidoo
- Stay Away, Joe
- What's So Bad About Feeling Good?
- Where Angels Go, Trouble Follows
- Where Were You When the Lights Went Out?
- The Wicked Dreams of Paula Schultz
- With Six You Get Eggroll
- Yours, Mine and Ours

==== 1969 ====
- 2000 Years Later
- Alice's Restaurant
- Angel in My Pocket
- The April Fools
- Bob & Carol & Ted & Alice
- A Boy Named Charlie Brown
- Cactus Flower
- The Comic
- Don't Drink the Water
- The Extraordinary Seaman
- Gaily, Gaily
- Generation
- The Great Bank Robbery
- Hello, Dolly!
- Hello Down There
- Hook, Line & Sinker
- How to Commit Marriage
- If It's Tuesday, This Must Be Belgium
- The Love Bug
- The Love God?
- The Maltese Bippy
- Midas Run
- Out of It
- Popi
- Putney Swope
- The Reivers
- The Secret of Santa Vittoria
- Some Kind of a Nut
- Support Your Local Sheriff!
- Take the Money and Run
- The Trouble with Girls
- Viva Max!
- The Wedding Party
- The Wrecking Crew

=== 1970s ===
==== 1970 ====
- The Aristocats
- The Boatniks
- Catch-22
- The Cheyenne Social Club
- The Computer Wore Tennis Shoes
- Doctor in Trouble
- Hi, Mom!
- Hoffman
- How Do I Love Thee?
- Kelly's Heroes
- Little Big Man
- M*A*S*H
- Myra Breckinridge
- The Out-of-Towners
- The Owl and the Pussycat
- Start the Revolution Without Me
- The Twelve Chairs
- There Was a Crooked Man...
- Which Way to the Front?

==== 1971 ====
- Dollars
- 200 Motels
- Bananas
- The Barefoot Executive
- Bedknobs and Broomsticks
- B.S. I Love You
- The Battle of Love's Return
- Bunny O'Hare
- Carnal Knowledge
- Drive, He Said
- Happy Birthday, Wanda June
- Harold and Maude
- The Hospital
- How to Frame a Figg
- Melody
- The Million Dollar Duck
- Mrs. Pollifax-Spy
- A New Leaf
- Plaza Suite
- Scandalous John
- The Skin Game
- Such Good Friends
- Support Your Local Gunfighter
- Taking Off
- Who Is Harry Kellerman and Why Is He Saying Those Terrible Things About Me?
- Willy Wonka & the Chocolate Factory

==== 1972 ====
- Another Nice Mess
- Avanti!
- Bluebeard
- Butterflies Are Free
- Cancel My Reservation
- The Candidate
- Come Back, Charleston Blue
- Everything You Always Wanted to Know About Sex* (*But Were Afraid to Ask)
- Every Little Crook and Nanny
- Fuzz
- Fritz the Cat
- Get to Know Your Rabbit
- Hammersmith Is Out
- The Heartbreak Kid
- The Honkers
- The Hot Rock
- The Life and Times of Judge Roy Bean
- Now You See Him, Now You Don't
- Pete 'n' Tillie
- Pink Flamingos
- Play It Again, Sam
- Pocket Money
- Pulp
- Slaughterhouse-Five
- Snoopy Come Home
- Snowball Express
- The Thing with Two Heads
- To Find a Man
- Travels with My Aunt
- The War Between Men and Women
- What's Up, Doc?
- Where Does It Hurt?

==== 1973 ====
- 40 Carats
- American Graffiti
- Blume in Love
- Charley and the Angel
- Class of '44
- Cops and Robbers
- Five on the Black Hand Side
- Harry in Your Pocket
- Kid Blue
- The Last Detail
- The Naked Ape
- Oklahoma Crude
- One Little Indian
- The Paper Chase
- Paper Moon
- Robin Hood
- Shamus
- Sleeper
- Slither
- Soft Beds, Hard Battles
- Steelyard Blues
- The Sting
- Superdad
- The Thief Who Came to Dinner
- The Train Robbers
- The World's Greatest Athlete

==== 1974 ====
- Blazing Saddles
- Dark Star
- Down and Dirty Duck
- Flesh Gordon
- Ginger in the Morning
- The Girl from Petrovka
- The Groove Tube
- Harry and Tonto
- Herbie Rides Again
- The Longest Yard
- The Nine Lives of Fritz the Cat
- Phantom of the Paradise
- Rhinoceros
- The Thorn
- Thunderbolt and Lightfoot
- Uptown Saturday Night
- Young Frankenstein

==== 1975 ====
- Aaron Loves Angela
- The Adventure of Sherlock Holmes' Smarter Brother
- The Apple Dumpling Gang
- At Long Last Love
- The Black Bird
- Blazing Stewardesses
- Cooley High
- Crazy Mama
- Dolemite
- Fore Play
- Funny Lady
- The Fortune
- Hearts of the West
- It Seemed Like a Good Idea at the Time
- Let's Do It Again
- Love and Death
- Lucky Lady
- Monty Python and the Holy Grail
- Moonrunners
- One of Our Dinosaurs Is Missing
- Peeper
- The Prisoner of Second Avenue
- Rancho Deluxe
- The Return of the Pink Panther
- The Rocky Horror Picture Show
- Rooster Cogburn
- Shampoo
- Sheila Levine Is Dead and Living in New York
- Sixpack Annie
- Smile
- The Strongest Man in the World
- The Sunshine Boys
- Whiffs
- W.W. and the Dixie Dancekings

==== 1976 ====
- Adiós Amigo
- The Bad News Bears
- The Big Bus
- The Bingo Long Traveling All-Stars & Motor Kings
- Cannonball
- Car Wash
- Chesty Anderson, USN
- The Duchess and the Dirtwater Fox
- Family Plot
- The First Nudie Musical
- Freaky Friday
- The Gumball Rally
- Gus
- Harry and Walter Go to New York
- Keep It Up Downstairs
- Mother, Jugs & Speed
- Murder by Death
- Network
- Nickelodeon
- No Deposit, No Return
- Norman... Is That You?
- The Pink Panther Strikes Again
- The Ritz
- The Shaggy D.A.
- Silent Movie
- Silver Streak
- Tunnel Vision

==== 1977 ====
- Annie Hall
- The Bad News Bears in Breaking Training
- The Billion Dollar Hobo
- Candleshoe
- The Chicken Chronicles
- Desperate Living
- Fun with Dick and Jane
- The Goodbye Girl
- Grand Theft Auto
- The Happy Hooker Goes to Washington
- Handle with Care
- Herbie Goes to Monte Carlo
- High Anxiety
- The Kentucky Fried Movie
- The Last Remake of Beau Geste
- The Late Show
- Mr. Billion
- Oh, God!
- A Piece of the Action
- Race for Your Life, Charlie Brown
- Semi-Tough
- Slap Shot
- Smokey and the Bandit
- Thieves
- Thunder and Lightning
- Which Way Is Up?
- The World's Greatest Lover

==== 1978 ====
- Almost Summer
- The Bad News Bears Go to Japan
- The Big Fix
- California Suite
- The Cat from Outer Space
- The Cheap Detective
- Corvette Summer
- Every Which Way but Loose
- Foul Play
- Goin' South
- The Great Bank Hoax
- Harper Valley PTA
- Heaven Can Wait
- Here Come the Tigers
- Hooper
- Hot Lead and Cold Feet
- Movie Movie
- National Lampoon's Animal House
- Rabbit Test
- Revenge of the Pink Panther
- Sextette
- Sgt. Pepper's Lonely Hearts Club Band
- Somebody Killed Her Husband
- Thank God It's Friday
- They Went That-A-Way & That-A-Way
- The End
- Up in Smoke
- A Wedding
- Who Is Killing the Great Chefs of Europe?

==== 1979 ====
- 10
- 1941
- Americathon
- The Apple Dumpling Gang Rides Again
- Being There
- Breaking Away
- The Bugs Bunny/Road Runner Movie
- The Electric Horseman
- Fast Break
- The Fish That Saved Pittsburgh
- The Frisco Kid
- Hair
- Hot Stuff
- The In-Laws
- The Jerk
- Love at First Bite
- The Main Event
- Manhattan
- Meatballs
- The Muppet Movie
- The North Avenue Irregulars
- North Dallas Forty
- A Perfect Couple
- The Prisoner of Zenda
- The Prize Fighter
- Real Life
- Richard Pryor: Live in Concert
- Rock 'n' Roll High School
- Scavenger Hunt
- Starting Over
- The Villain

=== 1980s ===
==== 1980 ====
- 9 to 5
- Airplane!
- Animalympics
- Any Which Way You Can
- The Blues Brothers
- Bon Voyage, Charlie Brown (and Don't Come Back!!)
- Caddyshack
- Can't Stop the Music
- A Change of Seasons
- Cheech and Chong's Next Movie
- Fatso
- First Family
- Galaxina
- Gilda Live
- The Gods Must Be Crazy
- Gorp
- Herbie Goes Bananas
- Hero at Large
- The Hollywood Knights
- Hopscotch
- How to Beat the High Cost of Living
- In God We Trust
- The Last Married Couple in America
- Little Darlings
- Melvin and Howard
- Midnight Madness
- The Nude Bomb
- Oh, God! Book II
- Oh! Heavenly Dog
- Popeye
- Pray TV
- Private Benjamin
- The Private Eyes
- Seems Like Old Times
- Serial
- Smokey and the Bandit II
- Stardust Memories
- Stir Crazy
- The Stunt Man
- Sunday Lovers
- Used Cars
- Up the Academy
- Where the Buffalo Roam
- Wholly Moses!

==== 1981 ====
- All Night Long
- ...All the Marbles
- Arthur
- Buddy Buddy
- Bustin' Loose
- The Cannonball Run
- Carbon Copy
- Caveman
- Chu Chu and the Philly Flash
- Condorman
- Continental Divide
- The Devil and Max Devlin
- Dirty Tricks
- First Monday in October
- The Four Seasons
- Full Moon High
- Going Ape!
- The Great Muppet Caper
- Hardly Working
- Heartbeeps
- History of the World, Part I
- The Incredible Shrinking Woman
- The Looney Looney Looney Bugs Bunny Movie
- Modern Problems
- Modern Romance
- My Dinner with Andre
- Neighbors
- Nice Dreams
- On the Right Track
- Paternity
- Polyester
- Porky's
- Private Lessons
- Shock Treatment
- S.O.B.
- So Fine
- Stripes
- Take This Job and Shove It
- They All Laughed
- Under the Rainbow
- Waitress!
- Zorro, The Gay Blade

==== 1982 ====
- 48 Hrs.
- A Little Sex
- A Midsummer Night's Sex Comedy
- Airplane II: The Sequel
- Annie
- Author! Author!
- Best Friends
- Bugs Bunny's 3rd Movie: 1001 Rabbit Tales
- Come Back to the 5 & Dime, Jimmy Dean, Jimmy Dean
- Creepshow
- Dead Men Don't Wear Plaid
- Deathtrap
- Diner
- Eating Raoul
- Fast Times at Ridgemont High
- Grease 2
- Hanky Panky
- Hey Good Lookin'
- Human Highway
- It Came from Hollywood
- Jekyll and Hyde... Together Again
- Jimmy the Kid
- Jinxed!
- The Junkman
- Kiss Me Goodbye
- The Last American Virgin
- Lookin' to Get Out
- My Favorite Year
- National Lampoon's Class Reunion
- National Lampoon's Movie Madness
- Neil Simon's I Ought to Be in Pictures
- Night Shift
- Pandemonium
- Partners
- The Pirate Movie
- Richard Pryor: Live on the Sunset Strip
- Six Pack
- Some Kind of Hero
- Soup for One
- Summer Lovers
- Tempest
- They Call Me Bruce?
- Things Are Tough All Over
- Tootsie
- The Toy
- Trail of the Pink Panther
- Victor/Victoria
- The World According to Garp
- Wrong Is Right
- Yes, Giorgio
- Young Doctors in Love
- Zapped!

==== 1983 ====
- A Christmas Story
- Baby It's You
- Better Late Than Never
- The Big Chill
- Bill Cosby: Himself
- Can She Bake a Cherry Pie?
- Class
- Cracking Up
- Curse of the Pink Panther
- Daffy Duck's Fantastic Island
- D.C. Cab
- Deal of the Century
- Doctor Detroit
- Easy Money
- Get Crazy
- Going Berserk
- The King of Comedy
- Local Hero
- Losin' It
- Lovesick
- The Man Who Loved Women
- The Man Who Wasn't There
- The Man With Two Brains
- Max Dugan Returns
- Mr. Mom
- My Tutor
- National Lampoon's Vacation
- Porky's II: The Next Day
- Private School
- Reuben, Reuben
- Richard Pryor: Here and Now
- Risky Business
- Romantic Comedy
- Screwballs
- Smokey and the Bandit Part 3
- Spring Break
- Still Smokin
- The Sting II
- Strange Brew
- Stroker Ace
- The Survivors
- To Be or Not to Be
- Trading Places
- Trenchcoat
- Twice Upon a Time
- Two of a Kind
- Valley Girl
- Yellowbeard

==== 1984 ====
- 16 Candles
- The Adventures of Buckaroo Banzai Across the 8th Dimension
- All of Me
- American Dreamer
- Bachelor Party
- Best Defense
- Beverly Hills Cop
- Blame It on Rio
- Broadway Danny Rose
- The Buddy System
- Cannonball Run II
- Cheech & Chong's The Corsican Brothers
- City Heat
- Crackers
- Electric Dreams
- Finders Keepers
- The Flamingo Kid
- Ghostbusters
- Grandview, U.S.A.
- Gremlins
- The Hotel New Hampshire
- Hot Dog…The Movie
- The Ice Pirates
- Irreconcilable Differences
- Johnny Dangerously
- Joy of Sex
- Kidco
- The Lonely Guy
- Lovelines
- Mass Appeal
- Meatballs Part II
- Micki & Maude
- Moscow on the Hudson
- The Muppets Take Manhattan
- Night Patrol
- No Small Affair
- Nothing Lasts Forever
- Oh, God! You Devil
- Police Academy
- Preppies
- Protocol
- Repo Man
- The Ratings Game
- Revenge of the Nerds
- Rhinestone
- Romancing the Stone
- Slapstick of Another Kind
- Splash
- Surf II
- Teachers
- This Is Spinal Tap
- Top Secret!
- The Toxic Avenger
- Unfaithfully Yours
- Up the Creek
- The Wild Life
- Where the Boys Are '84
- The Woman in Red

==== 1985 ====
- After Hours
- Back to the Future
- Bad Medicine
- Better Off Dead
- Breaking All the Rules
- The Breakfast Club
- Brewster's Millions
- Clue
- Cocoon
- Compromising Positions
- Creator
- Desperately Seeking Susan
- European Vacation
- Fandango
- Fletch
- Fraternity Vacation
- Girls Just Want to Have Fun
- The Goonies
- Head Office
- Heaven Help Us
- The Heavenly Kid
- Into the Night
- The Jewel of the Nile
- Just One of the Guys
- Key Exchange
- Lost in America
- Lust in the Dust
- The Man with One Red Shoe
- Maxie
- Mischief
- Moving Violations
- Movers & Shakers
- Murphy's Romance
- My Science Project
- Once Bitten
- Pee Wee's Big Adventure
- Police Academy 2: Their First Assignment
- Porky's Revenge
- Private Resort
- Prizzi's Honor
- The Purple Rose of Cairo
- Real Genius
- Remo Williams: The Adventure Begins
- Rustlers' Rhapsody
- Secret Admirer
- Sesame Street Presents: Follow That Bird
- The Slugger's Wife
- Spies Like Us
- Summer Rental
- The Sure Thing
- Teen Wolf
- Tomboy
- Transylvania 6-5000
- Turk 182
- Volunteers
- Weird Science

==== 1986 ====
- About Last Night
- April Fool's Day
- Armed and Dangerous
- Back to School
- The Best of Times
- Big Trouble in Little China
- Big Trouble
- The Boss' Wife
- Brighton Beach Memoirs
- The Class of Nuke 'Em High
- Club Paradise
- Crocodile Dundee
- Down and Out in Beverly Hills
- Echo Park
- Ferris Bueller's Day Off
- A Fine Mess
- The Golden Child
- Gung Ho
- Hamburger: The Motion Picture
- Hannah and Her Sisters
- Haunted Honeymoon
- Heartburn
- Heathcliff: The Movie
- Hollywood Vice Squad
- Howard the Duck
- Impure Thoughts
- Jake Speed
- Jo Jo Dancer, Your Life Is Calling
- Jumpin' Jack Flash
- Last Resort
- Legal Eagles
- Little Shop of Horrors
- The Longshot
- Lucas
- Miracles
- Modern Girls
- The Money Pit
- My Chauffeur
- Night of the Creeps
- Nobody's Fool
- Nothing in Common
- Odd Jobs
- Off Beat
- One Crazy Summer
- One More Saturday Night
- Peggy Sue Got Married
- Playing for Keeps
- Police Academy 3: Back in Training
- Running Scared
- Ruthless People
- Shanghai Surprise
- She's Gotta Have It
- Short Circuit
- Something Wild
- Soul Man
- Stewardess School
- Stoogemania
- Sweet Liberty
- ¡Three Amigos!
- Tough Guys
- True Stories
- Wildcats
- Wise Guys
- Zeisters

==== 1987 ====
- Adventures in Babysitting
- The Allnighter
- Amazon Women on the Moon
- Baby Boom
- Back to the Beach
- Barfly
- * batteries not included
- Beverly Hills Cop II
- Blind Date
- Born in East L.A.
- Broadcast News
- Burglar
- Can't Buy Me Love
- Creepshow 2
- Critical Condition
- Cross My Heart
- Disorderlies
- Dudes
- Dragnet
- Eddie Murphy Raw
- Ernest Goes to Camp
- Fatal Beauty
- From the Hip
- The Garbage Pail Kids Movie
- Going Bananas
- Good Morning, Vietnam
- Harry and the Hendersons
- He's My Girl
- Hello Again
- Hot Pursuit
- Housekeeping
- Hunk
- Innerspace
- In the Mood
- Ishtar
- Leonard Part 6
- Lethal Weapon
- Like Father Like Son
- Love at Stake
- Made in Heaven
- Maid to Order
- Making Mr. Right
- Mannequin
- Meatballs III: Summer Job
- Moonstruck
- Morgan Stewart's Coming Home
- Munchies
- My Demon Lover
- Nadine
- Nice Girls Don't Explode
- Outrageous Fortune
- Overboard
- The Pick-up Artist
- Planes, Trains and Automobiles
- Police Academy 4: Citizens on Patrol
- Pretty Smart
- The Princess Bride
- Project X
- Radio Days
- Raising Arizona
- Real Men
- Rent-a-Cop
- Revenge of the Nerds II: Nerds in Paradise
- Roxanne
- The Secret of My Success
- Spaceballs
- The Squeeze
- Stakeout
- Street Trash
- Summer School
- Surrender
- Teen Wolf Too
- The Trouble with Spies
- They Still Call Me Bruce
- Three for the Road
- Three Men and a Baby
- Three O'Clock High
- Throw Momma from the Train
- Tin Men
- The Underachievers
- Walk Like a Man
- Who's That Girl
- The Witches of Eastwick

==== 1988 ====
- 18 Again!
- A Fish Called Wanda
- Action Jackson
- And God Created Woman
- Arthur 2: On the Rocks
- Beetlejuice
- Big
- Big Business
- Big Top Pee-wee
- Biloxi Blues
- The Blue Iguana
- Bull Durham
- Caddyshack II
- Casual Sex?
- Cherry 2000
- Cocktail
- Coming to America
- Crash Course
- Crocodile Dundee II
- The Couch Trip
- Daffy Duck's Quackbusters
- Dangerous Curves
- Dead Heat
- Dirty Rotten Scoundrels
- Doin' Time on Planet Earth
- Drowning by Numbers
- Earth Girls Are Easy
- Elvira: Mistress of the Dark
- Ernest Saves Christmas
- Feds
- For Keeps
- Funny Farm
- The Great Outdoors
- Hairspray
- Heartbreak Hotel
- High Spirits
- Hot to Trot
- I'm Gonna Git You Sucka
- Johnny Be Good
- Killer Klowns from Outer Space
- License to Drive
- Mac and Me
- Married to the Mob
- Memories of Me
- Midnight Run
- Moon over Parador
- Moving
- Mr. North
- Mystic Pizza
- My Stepmother Is an Alien
- The Naked Gun: From the Files of Police Squad!
- A New Life
- The Night Before
- Not of This Earth
- Pass the Ammo
- Plain Clothes
- Police Academy 5: Assignment Miami Beach
- The Prince of Pennsylvania
- Punchline
- Purple People Eater
- Rain Man
- Red Heat
- Satisfaction
- School Daze
- Scrooged
- She's Having a Baby
- Short Circuit 2
- Some Girls
- Stars and Bars
- Sticky Fingers
- Sweet Hearts Dance
- Switching Channels
- Tapeheads
- Things Change
- The Telephone
- Twins
- Vibes
- Vice Versa
- Who Framed Roger Rabbit
- Without a Clue
- Working Girl
- You Can't Hurry Love

==== 1989 ====
- Back to the Future Part II
- Beverly Hills Brats
- The Big Picture
- Bill & Ted's Excellent Adventure
- Bloodhounds of Broadway
- Breaking In
- The 'Burbs
- Cannibal Women in the Avocado Jungle of Death
- Chances Are
- Checking Out
- Christmas Vacation
- C.H.U.D. II: Bud the C.H.U.D.
- Cold Feet
- Cookie
- Cousins
- Crimes and Misdemeanors
- Dad
- Disorganized Crime
- Dream a Little Dream
- The Dream Team
- The Experts
- The Fabulous Baker Boys
- Family Business
- Fletch Lives
- Ghostbusters II
- The Gods Must Be Crazy II
- Going Overboard
- Harlem Nights
- Heathers
- Her Alibi
- Homer and Eddie
- Honey, I Shrunk the Kids
- How I Got into College
- Identity Crisis
- The January Man
- K-9
- Lethal Weapon 2
- Let It Ride
- Little Monsters
- Look Who's Talking
- Loverboy
- Major League
- Meet the Feebles
- Miss Firecracker
- New York Stories
- Out Cold
- Parenthood
- Parents
- Penn & Teller Get Killed
- Pink Cadillac
- Police Academy 6: City Under Siege
- Powwow Highway
- Roger & Me (documentary)
- Rude Awakening
- Say Anything...
- Scenes from the Class Struggle in Beverly Hills
- Second Sight
- See No Evil, Hear No Evil
- See You in the Morning
- Shag
- She-Devil
- She's Out of Control
- Shocker
- Skin Deep
- Society
- Slaves of New York
- Speed Zone
- Staying Together
- Steel Magnolias
- Tango & Cash
- Teen Witch
- The Toxic Avenger Part II
- The Toxic Avenger Part III: The Last Temptation of Toxie
- Three Fugitives
- Transylvania Twist
- Traveling Man
- Troop Beverly Hills
- True Love
- Turner & Hooch
- Twister
- UHF
- Uncle Buck
- Vampire's Kiss
- The War of the Roses
- Weekend at Bernie's
- We're No Angels
- When Harry Met Sally...
- Who's Harry Crumb?
- Wicked Stepmother
- The Wizard
- Worth Winning
- Young Einstein

=== 1990s ===
==== 1990 ====
- The Adventures of Ford Fairlane
- Air America
- Another 48 Hrs.
- Arachnophobia
- Back to the Future Part III
- Basket Case 2
- Betsy's Wedding
- Bird on a Wire
- The Bonfire of the Vanities
- Cadillac Man
- Crazy People
- Don't Tell Her It's Me
- Downtown
- Ernest Goes to Jail
- Far Out Man
- Flashback
- The Freshman
- Funny About Love
- Ghost Dad
- Gremlins 2: The New Batch
- Green Card
- Heart Condition
- Home Alone
- House Party
- I Love You to Death
- In the Spirit
- Jetsons: The Movie
- Joe Versus the Volcano
- Kindergarten Cop
- The Lemon Sisters
- Look Who's Talking Too
- Loose Cannons
- Love Hurts
- Madhouse
- A Man Called Sarge
- Men at Work
- Metropolitan
- Modern Love
- My Blue Heaven
- Ninja Academy
- Opportunity Knocks
- Postcards from the Edge
- Pretty Woman
- Problem Child
- Quick Change
- Repossessed
- A Shock to the System
- Short Time
- Sibling Rivalry
- Spaced Invaders
- The Spirit of '76
- Taking Care of Business
- Teenage Mutant Ninja Turtles
- Three Men and a Little Lady
- Tune in Tomorrow
- Why Me?

==== 1991 ====
- The Addams Family
- Age Isn't Everything
- And You Thought Your Parents Were Weird
- Another You
- Bill & Ted's Bogus Journey
- Bingo
- Career Opportunities
- City Slickers
- Defending Your Life
- Delirious
- Doc Hollywood
- Don't Tell Mom the Babysitter's Dead
- Drop Dead Fred
- Dutch
- Ernest Scared Stupid
- Fast Getaway
- Father of the Bride
- The Fisher King
- Frankie & Johnny
- The Hard Way
- Hook
- Hot Shots!
- House Party 2
- Hudson Hawk
- King Ralph
- L.A. Story
- Life Stinks
- The Linguini Incident
- Mannequin Two: On the Move
- Meet the Applegates
- Mystery Date
- The Naked Gun 2 1/2: The Smell of Fear
- Necessary Roughness
- Night on Earth
- Nothing but Trouble
- Only the Lonely
- Oscar
- Other People's Money
- Problem Child 2
- Pure Luck
- A Rage in Harlem
- Rover Dangerfield
- Scenes from a Mall
- Sgt. Kabukiman N.Y.P.D.
- Shadows and Fog
- Soapdish
- Strictly Business
- Suburban Commando
- The Super
- Switch
- Talkin' Dirty After Dark
- Teenage Mutant Ninja Turtles II: The Secret of the Ooze
- V.I. Warshawski
- What About Bob?

==== 1992 ====
- 3 Ninjas
- Bebe's Kids
- Beethoven
- Big Girls Don't Cry... They Get Even
- Boomerang
- Blame It on the Bellboy
- Boris and Natasha: The Movie
- Brain Donors
- Buffy the Vampire Slayer
- Captain Ron
- Class Act
- Cool World
- The Cutting Edge
- Death Becomes Her
- The Distinguished Gentleman
- Enchanted April
- Encino Man
- Frozen Assets
- The Gun in Betty Lou's Handbag
- Hero
- Home Alone 2: Lost in New York
- Honey, I Blew Up the Kid
- Honeymoon in Vegas
- Housesitter
- Inside Monkey Zetterland
- In the Soup
- Kuffs
- Ladybugs
- A League of Their Own
- Leap of Faith
- Lethal Weapon 3
- Little Sister
- Love Potion No. 9
- Man Trouble
- Memoirs of an Invisible Man
- The Mighty Ducks
- Mo' Money
- Mom and Dad Save the World
- Mr. Baseball
- Mr. Saturday Night
- My Cousin Vinny
- Nervous Ticks
- Noises Off
- Once upon a Crime
- Only You
- Out on a Limb
- Passed Away
- The Player
- Revenge of the Nerds III: The Next Generation
- Shakes the Clown
- Singles
- Sister Act
- Sneakers
- Stay Tuned
- Stop! Or My Mom Will Shoot
- Straight Talk
- There Goes the Neighborhood
- Toys
- Wayne's World
- White Men Can't Jump

==== 1993 ====
- Addams Family Values
- Amos & Andrew
- Another Stakeout
- Beethoven's 2nd
- Benny & Joon
- The Beverly Hillbillies
- Born Yesterday
- Cannibal! The Musical
- CB4
- Coneheads
- Cool Runnings
- Cop and a Half
- Dave
- Dazed and Confused
- Dennis the Menace
- The Double 0 Kid
- Ed and His Dead Mother
- Ernest Rides Again
- Fatal Instinct
- Father Hood
- For Love or Money
- Freaked
- Groundhog Day
- Grumpy Old Men
- Heart and Souls
- Hexed
- Homeward Bound
- Hocus Pocus
- Hot Shots! Part Deux
- Josh and S.A.M.
- Just One of the Girls
- Last Action Hero
- Life with Mikey
- Loaded Weapon 1
- Look Who's Talking Now!
- Mad Dog and Glory
- Made in America
- Manhattan Murder Mystery
- The Meteor Man
- Mrs. Doubtfire
- My Boyfriend's Back
- Much Ado About Nothing
- The Night We Never Met
- The Positively True Adventures of the Alleged Texas Cheerleader-Murdering Mom
- Robin Hood: Men in Tights
- Rookie of the Year
- The Sandlot
- Sister Act 2: Back in the Habit
- Sleepless in Seattle
- So I Married an Axe Murderer
- Son in Law
- Son of the Pink Panther
- Surf Ninjas
- Teenage Mutant Ninja Turtles III
- Undercover Blues
- Wayne's World 2
- Weekend at Bernie's II
- We're Back! A Dinosaur's Story

==== 1994 ====
- Ace Ventura: Pet Detective
- Airheads
- The Air Up There
- Angels in the Outfield
- Baby's Day Out
- Barcelona
- Beverly Hills Cop III
- Blank Check
- Blankman
- Bullets Over Broadway
- Cabin Boy
- Camp Nowhere
- Car 54, Where Are You?
- City Slickers II: The Legend of Curly's Gold
- Clean Slate
- Clerks
- Clifford
- Cops & Robbersons
- The Cowboy Way
- The Crazysitter
- D2: The Mighty Ducks
- Don't Drink the Water
- Dumb and Dumber
- Ed Wood
- Ernest Goes to School
- Exit to Eden
- Fast Getaway II
- Fear of a Black Hat
- The Flintstones
- Getting Even with Dad
- Greedy
- Guarding Tess
- Hail Caesar
- House Party 3
- The Hudsucker Proxy
- I Love Trouble
- In the Army Now
- The Inkwell
- I.Q.
- It Could Happen to You
- It's Pat
- Jimmy Hollywood
- Junior
- Lightning Jack
- Little Big League
- Little Giants
- The Little Rascals
- A Low Down Dirty Shame
- Major League II
- The Mask
- Maverick
- Mixed Nuts
- My Summer Story
- Naked Gun 33 1/3: The Final Insult
- National Lampoon's Last Resort
- Next Door
- Nobody's Fool
- North
- Only You
- PCU
- Police Academy: Mission to Moscow
- Radioland Murders
- Prêt-à-Porter
- Reality Bites
- The Ref
- Renaissance Man
- Revenge of the Nerds IV: Nerds in Love
- Ri¢hie Ri¢h
- The Road to Welville
- The Santa Clause
- The Scout
- Serial Mom
- Spanking the Monkey
- The Stoned Age
- Swimming with Sharks
- Threesome
- Trapped in Paradise
- True Lies
- Wagons East

==== 1995 ====
- Ace Ventura: When Nature Calls
- The American President
- Bad Boys
- Billy Madison
- Blue in the Face
- Blue Juice
- The Brady Bunch Movie
- Bushwhacked
- A Bucket of Blood
- Bye Bye Love
- Canadian Bacon
- Casper
- Clueless
- Dracula: Dead and Loving It
- Dream a Little Dream 2
- Empire Records
- Father of the Bride Part II
- Forget Paris
- Four Rooms
- French Kiss
- Friday
- Get Shorty
- Grumpier Old Men
- Heavyweights
- Home for the Holidays
- Houseguest
- It Takes Two
- Jeffrey
- The Jerky Boys: The Movie
- Jumanji
- Jury Duty
- A Kid in King Arthur's Court
- The Last Supper
- Live Nude Girls
- Living in Oblivion
- Major Payne
- Mallrats
- Man of the House
- Mighty Aphrodite
- National Lampoon's Senior Trip
- Nine Months
- Operation Dumbo Drop
- Problem Child 3: Junior in Love
- Sabrina
- Showgirls
- Slam Dunk Ernest
- Things to Do in Denver When You're Dead
- Tommy Boy
- Toy Story
- Vampire in Brooklyn
- While You Were Sleeping

==== 1996 ====
- 101 Dalmatians
- The Associate
- Beautiful Girls
- Beavis and Butt-Head Do America
- Big Bully
- Bio-Dome
- The Birdcage
- Black Sheep
- Bottle Rocket
- Bulletproof
- The Cable Guy
- Carpool
- Celtic Pride
- Curdled
- D3: The Mighty Ducks
- Dear God
- Don't Be a Menace to South Central While Drinking Your Juice in the Hood
- Down Periscope
- Dunston Checks In
- Ed
- Eddie
- Emma
- Faithful
- Fargo
- Feeling Minnesota
- First Kid
- The First Wives Club
- Flirting with Disaster
- The Frighteners
- Getting Away with Murder
- The Great White Hype
- Happy Gilmore
- Harriet the Spy
- Head Above Water
- High School High
- Homeward Bound II: Lost in San Francisco
- House Arrest
- I’m Not Rappaport
- Jack
- Jerry Maguire
- Jingle All the Way
- Joe's Apartment
- Kazaam
- Kingpin
- Larger than Life
- Mad Dog Time
- Mars Attacks!
- Matilda
- Michael
- The Mirror Has Two Faces
- Mother
- Mr. Wrong
- Mrs. Winterbourne
- Multiplicity
- Muppet Treasure Island
- My Fellow Americans
- The Nutty Professor
- One Fine Day
- The Pallbearer
- Palookavlle
- Phat Beach
- Puddle Cruiser
- Santa with Muscles
- Sgt. Bilko
- She's the One
- Space Jam
- Spy Hard
- Striptease
- The Stupids
- SubUrbia
- Swingers
- That Thing You Do!
- Theodore Rex
- A Thin Line Between Love and Hate
- Tin Cup
- The Truth About Cats & Dogs
- Two Much
- A Very Brady Sequel
- Waiting for Guffman

==== 1997 ====
- The 6th Man
- 8 Heads in a Duffel Bag
- A Smile Like Yours
- As Good as It Gets
- Addicted to Love
- Air Bud
- An American Werewolf in Paris
- Austin Powers: International Man of Mystery
- B.A.P.S.
- Beverly Hills Ninja
- Bean the Ultimate Disaster Movie
- Booty Call
- Breast Men
- Chasing Amy
- Deconstructing Harry
- Def Jam's How to Be a Player
- Ernest Goes to Africa
- Fathers' Day
- Fierce Creatures
- Flubber
- For Richer or Poorer
- George of the Jungle
- Gone Fishin'
- Good Burger
- Grosse Pointe Blank
- Hercules
- Home Alone 3
- Honey, We Shrunk Ourselves
- The House of Yes
- In & Out
- Jungle 2 Jungle
- Liar Liar
- The Man Who Knew Too Little
- The Matchmaker
- McHale's Navy
- Men in Black
- Money Talks
- Mouse Hunt
- Mr. Magoo
- Nothing to Lose
- Orgazmo
- Out to Sea
- The Pest
- Picture Perfect
- The Real Blonde
- RocketMan
- Romy and Michele's High School Reunion
- Six Ways to Sunday
- Snowboard Academy
- Sprung
- Toothless
- Trial and Error
- Two Girls and a Guy
- Under Wraps
- Vegas Vacation
- Wag the Dog

==== 1998 ====
- Almost Heroes
- An Alan Smithee Film: Burn Hollywood Burn
- Antz
- Barney's Great Adventure
- BASEketball
- The Big Hit
- The Big Lebowski
- Billy's Hollywood Screen Kiss
- Blues Brothers 2000
- Bongwater
- A Bug's Life
- Bulworth
- Can't Hardly Wait
- Celebrity
- Chairman of the Board
- Cousin Bette
- Dead Man on Campus
- Dirty Work
- Dog Park
- Dr. Dolittle
- Ernest in the Army
- Fear and Loathing in Las Vegas
- Free Enterprise
- Free Money
- The Godson
- Hairshirt
- The Hairy Bird
- Half Baked
- High Freakquency
- Holy Man
- How Stella Got Her Groove Back
- How to Make the Cruelest Month
- I Got the Hook-Up
- I'll Be Home for Christmas
- The Impostors
- Jack Frost
- Kissing a Fool
- Krippendorf's Tribe
- Lethal Weapon 4
- Mafia!
- Meet the Deedles
- Major League: Back to the Minors
- Mulan
- My Giant
- A Night at the Roxbury
- The Object of My Affection
- The Odd Couple II
- The Opposite of Sex
- Overnight Delivery
- The Parent Trap
- Patch Adams
- Paulie
- Pecker
- Playing by Heart
- Pleasantville
- Practical Magic
- Primary Colors
- The Rugrats Movie
- Rush Hour
- Rushmore
- Safe Men
- Senseless
- Shakespeare in Love
- Simon Birch
- Six Days, Seven Nights
- Sliding Doors
- Slums of Beverly Hills
- Small Soldiers
- The Truman Show
- There's Something About Mary
- Very Bad Things
- The Waterboy
- The Wedding Singer
- With Friends Like These...
- The Wonderful Ice Cream Suit
- Woo
- Wrongfully Accused
- You've Got Mail

==== 1999 ====
- 10 Things I Hate About You
- 20 Dates
- A Midsummer Night's Dream
- The Adventures of Elmo in Grouchland
- The Adventures of Sebastian Cole
- The All New Adventures of Laurel & Hardy in For Love or Mummy
- American Pie
- Analyze This
- Austin Powers: The Spy Who Shagged Me
- Baby Geniuses
- The Bachelor
- Being John Malkovich
- The Best Man
- Bicentennial Man
- The Big Tease
- Big Daddy
- Blast from the Past
- Bowfinger
- Breakfast of Champions
- The Breaks
- But I'm a Cheerleader
- Chutney Popcorn
- Cookie's Fortune
- Coming Soon
- Detroit Rock City
- Deuce Bigalow: Male Gigolo
- Diamonds
- Dick
- Dogma
- Drive Me Crazy
- Drop Dead Gorgeous
- Doug's 1st Movie
- Dudley Do-Right
- EDtv
- Election
- Foolish
- Forces of Nature
- Galaxy Quest
- Go
- Happy, Texas
- Holy Smoke!
- Illuminata
- Inspector Gadget
- Life
- Lost & Found
- Love and Action in Chicago
- The Love Letter
- Love Stinks
- Man of the Century
- Man on the Moon
- Mickey Blue Eyes
- Muppets from Space
- The Muse
- My Favorite Martian
- Mystery Men
- Mystery, Alaska
- Mumford
- Never Been Kissed
- Notting Hill
- Office Space
- The Other Sister
- Outside Providence
- The Out-of-Towners
- Pros & Cons
- Runaway Bride
- The Sex Monster
- She's All That
- SLC Punk
- South Park: Bigger, Longer & Uncut
- Splendor
- The Story of Us
- Stuart Little
- Superstar
- Sweet and Lowdown
- Tarzan
- Teaching Mrs. Tingle
- Three to Tango
- Toy Story 2
- Trick
- Trippin'

=== 2000s ===
==== 2000 ====
- 28 Days
- 100 Girls
- 102 Dalmatians
- 3 Strikes
- 2001: A Space Travesty
- The Adventures of Rocky and Bullwinkle
- An Extremely Goofy Movie
- Bedazzled
- Beethoven's 3rd
- Best in Show
- Big Momma's House
- Boys and Girls
- Bring It On
- Bruno
- Charlie's Angels
- Committed
- Coyote Ugly
- The Crew
- Down to You
- Dr. T & the Women
- Drowning Mona
- Dude, Where's My Car?
- Duets
- The Emperor's New Groove
- The Family Man
- The Flintstones in Viva Rock Vegas
- Gun Shy
- Held Up
- High Fidelity
- How the Grinch Stole Christmas
- Isn't She Great
- Keeping the Faith
- The Kid
- The Ladies Man
- Little Nicky
- The Little Vampire
- Loser
- Lucky Numbers
- Me, Myself & Irene
- Meet the Parents
- Miss Congeniality
- My Dog Skip
- My 5 Wives
- The Next Best Thing
- Next Friday
- Nurse Betty
- Nutty Professor II: The Klumps
- O Brother, Where Art Thou?
- The Original Kings of Comedy
- Picking Up the Pieces
- Playing Mona Lisa
- Play It to the Bone
- Ready to Rumble
- The Replacements
- Return to Me
- The Road to El Dorado
- Road Trip
- Rugrats in Paris: The Movie
- Scary Movie
- Screwed
- Shanghai Noon
- Small Time Crooks
- Snow Day
- The Specials
- State and Main
- The Tigger Movie
- What Planet Are You From?
- What Women Want
- Whipped
- The Whole Nine Yards

==== 2001 ====
- 3000 Miles to Graceland
- The American Astronaut
- American Desi
- American Pie 2
- America's Sweethearts
- The Animal
- Bandits
- Black Knight
- Bridget Jones's Diary
- The Brothers
- Bubble Boy
- Camouflage
- Cats & Dogs
- Corky Romano
- Crocodile Dundee in Los Angeles
- The Curse of the Jade Scorpion
- Double Take
- Down to Earth
- Dr. Dolittle 2
- Elvira's Haunted Hills
- Evolution
- Festival in Cannes
- Freddy Got Fingered
- Get Over It
- Gosford Park
- Head over Heels
- Heartbreakers
- How High
- Human Nature
- Jay and Silent Bob Strike Back
- Jimmy Neutron: Boy Genius
- Joe Dirt
- Joe Somebody
- Josie and the Pussycats
- Just Visiting
- Kate & Leopold
- Kevin of the North
- Kingdom Come
- A Knight's Tale
- Legally Blonde
- Living in Missouri
- The Lost Skeleton of Cadavra
- Love and Support
- Lovely & Amazing
- Made
- Max Keeble's Big Move
- The Mexican
- Monkeybone
- Monsters, Inc.
- Not Another Teen Movie
- Novocaine
- Ocean's Eleven
- One Night at McCool's
- Osmosis Jones
- Out Cold
- Pootie Tang
- The Princess Diaries
- Rat Race
- Riding in Cars with Boys
- The Royal Tenenbaums
- Rush Hour 2
- Saving Silverman
- Say It Isn't So
- Scary Movie 2
- See Spot Run
- Serendipity
- Shallow Hal
- Shrek
- Someone like You
- Spy Kids
- Sugar & Spice
- Summer Catch
- Title to Murder
- Tomcats
- Town & Country
- Two Can Play That Game
- The Wash
- The Wedding Planner
- Wet Hot American Summer
- What's the Worst That Could Happen?
- Zoolander

==== 2002 ====
- 40 Days and 40 Nights
- About Schmidt
- Adaptation.
- The Adventures of Pluto Nash
- All About the Benjamins
- American Girl
- Analyze That
- Austin Powers in Goldmember
- The Banger Sisters
- Barbershop
- Big Fat Liar
- Big Trouble
- Birthday Girl
- Boat Trip
- Brown Sugar
- Buying the Cow
- Catch Me If You Can
- Cherish
- Chicago
- Clockstoppers
- The Country Bears
- Crossroads
- Death to Smoochy
- Eight Crazy Nights
- Eight Legged Freaks
- Frank McKlusky, C.I.
- Friday After Next
- The Good Girl
- Hey Arnold!: The Movie
- Hollywood Ending
- The Hot Chick
- I Spy
- Ice Age
- Igby Goes Down
- Jackass: The Movie
- Juwanna Mann
- Kung Pow! Enter the Fist
- Like Mike
- Lilo & Stitch
- Maid in Manhattan
- Martin Lawrence Live: Runteldat
- The Master of Disguise
- Men in Black II
- Mr. Deeds
- My Big Fat Greek Wedding
- The New Guy
- Orange County
- Pumpkin
- Punch-Drunk Love
- Real Women Have Curves
- Repli-Kate
- The Santa Clause 2
- Scooby-Doo
- Serving Sara
- Showtime
- Snow Dogs
- Sorority Boys
- Spy Kids 2: The Island of Lost Dreams
- Stealing Harvard
- Stuart Little 2
- Super Troopers
- Sweet Home Alabama
- The Sweetest Thing
- Tadpole
- The Tuxedo
- Two Weeks Notice
- Undercover Brother
- Van Wilder
- Waking Up in Reno

==== 2003 ====
- Agent Cody Banks
- Alex & Emma
- American Splendor
- American Wedding
- Anger Management
- Anything Else
- Bad Boys II
- Bad Santa
- Bringing Down the House
- Brother Bear
- Bruce Almighty
- The Cat in the Hat
- Charlie's Angels: Full Throttle
- Cheaper by the Dozen
- Cosmopolitan
- Daddy Day Care
- Death of a Dynasty
- Deliver Us from Eva
- Dickie Roberts: Former Child Star
- Down with Love
- Dumb and Dumberer: When Harry Met Lloyd
- Duplex
- Dysfunktional Family
- Elf
- The Fighting Temptations
- Finding Nemo
- From Justin to Kelly
- G-Sale
- George of the Jungle 2
- Gigli
- Good Boy!
- Grind
- A Guy Thing
- The Haunted Mansion
- Head of State
- Hollywood Homicide
- How to Lose a Guy in 10 Days
- The In-Laws
- Inspector Gadget 2
- Intolerable Cruelty
- Just Married
- Kangaroo Jack
- Legally Blonde 2: Red, White & Blonde
- The Lizzie McGuire Movie
- Looney Tunes: Back in Action
- Lost in Translation
- Love Actually
- Malibu's Most Wanted
- Matchstick Men
- The Medallion
- A Mighty Wind
- National Lampoon Presents Dorm Daze
- National Lampoon's Gold Diggers
- National Security
- Old School
- Pauly Shore Is Dead
- Pieces of April
- Piglet's Big Movie
- Rugrats Go Wild
- Run Ronnie Run!
- The Rundown
- Scary Movie 3
- School of Rock
- Scorched
- Secondhand Lions
- Shanghai Knights
- Something's Gotta Give
- Spy Kids 3-D: Game Over
- Stuck on You
- Under the Tuscan Sun
- Uptown Girls
- View from the Top
- What a Girl Wants

==== 2004 ====
- 13 Going on 30
- 50 First Dates
- After the Sunset
- Agent Cody Banks 2: Destination London
- Along Came Polly
- Anchorman: The Legend of Ron Burgundy
- Around the World in 80 Days
- Barbershop 2: Back in Business
- The Big Bounce
- Breakin' All the Rules
- Catch That Kid
- Christmas with the Kranks
- Chasing Liberty
- Club Dread
- Connie and Carla
- Confessions of a Teenage Drama Queen
- The Cookout
- D.E.B.S.
- A Dirty Shame
- DodgeBall: A True Underdog Story
- Ella Enchanted
- Employee of the Month
- Envy
- Eulogy
- EuroTrip
- Fat Albert
- First Daughter
- Garden State
- Garfield: The Movie
- The Girl Next Door
- Harold & Kumar Go to White Castle
- Home on the Range
- I Heart Huckabees
- In Good Company
- The Incredibles
- Jiminy Glick in Lalawood
- Johnson Family Vacation
- Knots
- Kung Fu Hustle
- The Ladykillers
- Laws of Attraction
- The Life Aquatic with Steve Zissou
- The Lion King 1½
- Mean Girls
- Meet the Fockers
- Mr. 3000
- My Baby's Daddy
- Napoleon Dynamite
- New York Minute
- Nora's Hair Salon
- Ocean's Twelve
- The Perfect Score
- Raising Helen
- Saved!
- Saving Star Wars
- Scooby-Doo 2: Monsters Unleashed
- Shark Tale
- Shrek 2
- Sideways
- Sleepover
- Soul Plane
- Spanglish
- The SpongeBob SquarePants Movie
- Starsky & Hutch
- The Stepford Wives
- Straight-Jacket
- Surviving Christmas
- Taxi
- Teacher's Pet
- Team America: World Police
- The Terminal
- Welcome to Mooseport
- White Chicks
- The Whole Ten Yards
- Win a Date with Tad Hamilton!
- Without a Paddle

==== 2005 ====
- The 40-Year-Old Virgin
- Adam & Steve
- American Pie Presents: Band Camp
- Are We There Yet?
- Bad News Bears
- The Baxter
- Be Cool
- Beauty Shop
- Bewitched
- Bob the Butler
- Broken Flowers
- Cheaper by the Dozen 2
- Chicken Little
- Corpse Bride
- Deuce Bigalow: European Gigolo
- Dirty Deeds
- The Dukes of Hazzard
- Doogal
- The Family Stone
- Fever Pitch
- Formosa
- Fun with Dick and Jane
- Guess Who
- Herbie: Fully Loaded
- Hitch
- The Hitchhiker's Guide to the Galaxy
- The Honeymooners
- The Ice Harvest
- In Her Shoes
- In the Mix
- Junebug
- Just Friends
- Just Like Heaven
- Kicking & Screaming
- King's Ransom
- Kiss Kiss, Bang Bang
- The Longest Yard
- A Lot like Love
- Love Wrecked
- Madagascar
- The Man
- Man of the House
- Miss Congeniality 2: Armed and Fabulous
- Monster-in-Law
- Mr. & Mrs. Smith
- Must Love Dogs
- Never Been Thawed
- The Pacifier
- The Perfect Man
- Pervert!
- Pooh's Heffalump Movie
- Pretty Persuasion
- Prime
- The Producers
- Racing Stripes
- Rebound
- The Ringer
- Robots
- Rumor Has It
- Shopgirl
- The Sisterhood of the Traveling Pants
- Sky High
- Son of the Mask
- Southern Belles
- The Thing About My Folks
- Transamerica
- Underclassman
- Waiting...
- Wannabe
- Wedding Crashers
- The Wedding Date

==== 2006 ====
- 10 Items or Less
- Accepted
- The Alibi
- Aquamarine
- American Dreamz
- American Pie Presents: The Naked Mile
- The Ant Bully
- Art School Confidential
- Artie Lange's Beer League
- Barnyard
- Beerfest
- The Benchwarmers
- Big Momma's House 2
- Borat: Cultural Learnings of America for Make Benefit Glorious Nation of Kazakhstan
- The Break-Up
- Caffeine
- Cars
- Church Ball
- Clerks II
- Click
- The Darwin Awards
- Date Movie
- Dave Chappelle's Block Party
- Deck the Halls
- The Devil Wears Prada
- Employee of the Month
- The Ex
- Failure to Launch
- Flushed Away
- Friends with Money
- Funny Money
- Garfield: A Tail of Two Kitties
- Grandma's Boy
- The Guatemalan Handshake
- Happy Feet
- The Holiday
- Hood of Horror
- Hoodwinked!
- Hoot
- I Am a Sex Addict
- Ice Age: The Meltdown
- Idiocracy
- Jackass Number Two
- John Tucker Must Die
- Just My Luck
- Larry the Cable Guy: Health Inspector
- Last Holiday
- Let's Go to Prison
- Like Mike 2: Streetball
- Little Man
- Little Miss Sunshine
- Man of the Year
- My Super Ex-Girlfriend
- Nacho Libre
- Night at the Museum
- The Night of the White Pants
- The Oh in Ohio
- Open Season
- Over the Hedge
- Penelope
- The Pink Panther
- A Prairie Home Companion
- Puff, Puff, Pass
- Relative Strangers
- RV
- The Santa Clause 3: The Escape Clause
- Scary Movie 4
- Scoop
- School for Scoundrels
- The Shaggy Dog
- She's the Man
- Stick It
- Stranger Than Fiction
- Talladega Nights: The Ballad of Ricky Bobby
- Tenacious D in The Pick of Destiny
- Trailer Park Boys: The Movie
- Unaccompanied Minors
- Wedding Daze
- The Wild
- You, Me and Dupree
- Zoom

==== 2007 ====
- Alvin & the Chipmunks
- American Pie Presents: The Naked Mile
- Aqua Teen Hunger Force Colon Movie Film for Theaters
- Are We Done Yet?
- Balls of Fury
- Because I Said So
- Bee Movie
- Big Stan
- Blades of Glory
- Blonde Ambition
- The Brothers Solomon
- The Bucket List
- Catch and Release
- Chaos Theory
- Code Name: The Cleaner
- The Comebacks
- Daddy Day Camp
- Dan in Real Life
- The Darjeeling Limited
- Dedication
- Delta Farce
- Enchanted
- Epic Movie
- Evan Almighty
- Fred Claus
- The Game Plan
- Good Luck Chuck
- Hairspray
- The Heartbreak Kid
- Hot Rod
- I Could Never Be Your Woman
- I Now Pronounce You Chuck & Larry
- I Think I Love My Wife
- Juno
- Kabluey
- Kickin' It Old Skool
- Knocked Up
- License to Wed
- Meet Bill
- Meet the Robinsons
- Mr. Magorium's Wonder Emporium
- Mr. Woodcock
- Music and Lyrics
- The Nanny Diaries
- No Reservations
- Norbit
- Numb
- Ocean's Thirteen
- The Perfect Holiday
- Ratatouille
- Reno 911!: Miami
- Rush Hour 3
- Shrek the Third
- The Simpsons Movie
- Smiley Face
- Superbad
- Surf's Up
- Sydney White
- The Ten
- This Christmas
- Underdog
- Walk Hard: The Dewey Cox Story
- Wild Hogs

==== 2008 ====
- 27 Dresses
- The Accidental Husband
- An American Carol
- American Pie Presents: Beta House
- Angus, Thongs and Perfect Snogging
- Assassination of a High School President
- Baby Mama
- Be Kind Rewind
- Bedtime Stories
- Beverly Hills Chihuahua
- Bolt
- Burn After Reading
- College
- College Road Trip
- Definitely, Maybe
- Disaster Movie
- Dog Gone
- Drillbit Taylor
- Extreme Movie
- First Sunday
- Fool's Gold
- Forgetting Sarah Marshall
- Four Christmases
- Get Smart
- Ghost Town
- Hamlet 2
- Harold
- Harold & Kumar Escape from Guantanamo Bay
- Horton Hears a Who!
- The House Bunny
- Kung Fu Panda
- The Love Guru
- Madagascar: Escape 2 Africa
- Made of Honor
- Mamma Mia!
- Management
- Marley & Me
- Meet Dave
- Meet the Browns
- Meet the Spartans
- Miss Conception
- My Best Friend's Girl
- Nick & Norah's Infinite Playlist
- Nobel Son
- Nothing like the Holidays
- The Other End of the Line
- Over Her Dead Body
- Pineapple Express
- Private Valentine: Blonde & Dangerous
- The Rocker
- Role Models
- Run Fatboy Run
- Semi-Pro
- Sex and the City
- Sex Drive
- The Sisterhood of the Traveling Pants 2
- Space Chimps
- Step Brothers
- Strange Wilderness
- Superhero Movie
- Surfer, Dude
- Tropic Thunder
- War, Inc.
- Welcome Home Roscoe Jenkins
- What Happens in Vegas
- What Just Happened
- Wieners
- Wild Child
- The Women
- Yes Man
- You Don't Mess with the Zohan
- Zack and Miri Make a Porno

==== 2009 ====
- 17 Again
- 500 Days of Summer
- Adventureland
- Aliens in the Attic
- All About Steve
- All's Faire in Love
- Alvin and the Chipmunks: The Squeakquel
- American High School
- American Pie Presents: The Book of Love
- Away We Go
- Baby on Board
- Balls Out: Gary the Tennis Coach
- Bandslam
- Bride Wars
- The Brothers Bloom
- Brüno
- Confessions of a Shopaholic
- Cold Souls
- Couples Retreat
- Cloudy with a Chance of Meatballs
- Dance Flick
- Did You Hear About the Morgans?
- Dr. Dolittle: Million Dollar Mutts
- Duplicity
- Extract
- Fanboys
- Fantastic Mr. Fox
- Fired Up!
- Funny People
- G-Force
- Gentlemen Broncos
- Ghosts of Girlfriends Past
- Good Hair
- The Hangover
- Hannah Montana: The Movie
- He's Just Not That Into You
- Hotel for Dogs
- House Broken
- I Hate Valentine's Day
- I Hope They Serve Beer in Hell
- I Love You, Beth Cooper
- I Love You, Man
- I Love You Phillip Morris
- Ice Age: Dawn of the Dinosaurs
- Imagine That
- The Invention of Lying
- It's Complicated
- Janky Promoters
- Land of the Lost
- Leaves of Grass
- Legally Blondes
- Madea Goes to Jail
- The Maiden Heist
- Miss March
- Monsters vs. Aliens
- The Mother of Invention
- My Life in Ruins
- Mystery Team
- New in Town
- Next Day Air
- Night at the Museum: Battle of the Smithsonian
- Observe and Report
- Old Dogs
- Paper Heart
- Paper Man
- Paul Blart: Mall Cop
- The Pink Panther 2
- Planet 51
- Play the Game
- Post Grad
- The Princess and the Frog
- The Proposal
- The Rebound
- Serious Moonlight
- Shorts
- The Six Wives of Henry Lefay
- The Slammin' Salmon
- Stan Helsing
- Stay Cool
- Sunshine Cleaning
- Taking Woodstock
- Timer
- The Ugly Truth
- Up
- Without a Paddle: Nature's Calling
- Women in Trouble
- World's Greatest Dad
- Year One
- Zombieland

=== 2010s ===
==== 2010 ====
- The Back-up Plan
- The Bounty Hunter
- Chickens in the Shadows
- Cop Out
- Crazy on the Outside
- Date Night
- Death at a Funeral
- Despicable Me
- Dinner for Schmucks
- The Drawn Together Movie: The Movie!
- Due Date
- Easy A
- The Extra Man
- Furry Vengeance
- Get Him to the Greek
- Going the Distance
- Greenberg
- Grown Ups
- Gulliver's Travels
- Hot Tub Time Machine
- How Do You Know
- How to Train Your Dragon
- It's Kind of a Funny Story
- Jackass 3D
- Just Wright
- Kick-Ass
- Killers
- Knight and Day
- Leap Year
- Letters to Juliet
- Life as We Know It
- Little Fockers
- Lottery Ticket
- MacGruber
- Marmaduke
- Machete
- Megamind
- Morning Glory
- The Other Guys
- Our Family Wedding
- Peep World
- Pete Smalls Is Dead
- Ramona and Beezus
- Ratko: The Dictator's Son
- Scott Pilgrim vs. the World
- Sex and the City 2
- She's Out of My League
- Shrek Forever After
- Space Chimps 2: Zartog Strikes Back
- The Spy Next Door
- Super
- The Switch
- Tangled
- Tooth Fairy
- Toy Story 3
- Tucker & Dale vs. Evil
- Valentine's Day
- Vampires Suck
- The Virginity Hit
- When in Rome
- Yogi Bear
- You Again
- Youth in Revolt
- You Will Meet a Tall Dark Stranger

==== 2011 ====
- 30 Minutes or Less
- 50/50
- Alvin and the Chipmunks: Chipwrecked
- Arthur
- Arthur Christmas
- Bad Teacher
- Beethoven's Christmas Adventure
- Bernie
- Big Mommas: Like Father, Like Son
- The Big Year
- Bridesmaids
- Bucky Larson: Born to Be a Star
- Butter
- Carnage
- Cars 2
- Cedar Rapids
- The Change-Up
- The Chaperone
- Crazy, Stupid, Love
- The Descendants
- The Details
- Diary of a Wimpy Kid: Rodrick Rules
- The Dilemma
- Flypaper
- Friends with Benefits
- From Prada to Nada
- Gnomeo & Juliet
- God Bless America
- A Good Old Fashioned Orgy
- The Green Hornet
- Hall Pass
- The Hangover Part II
- Hoodwinked Too! Hood vs. Evil
- Hop
- Horrible Bosses
- I Don't Know How She Does It
- Jack and Jill
- Judy Moody and the Not Bummer Summer
- Just Go with It
- Kung Fu Panda 2
- Larry Crowne
- Life Happens
- Love, Wedding, Marriage
- Madea's Big Happy Family
- Mean Girls 2
- Midnight in Paris
- Monte Carlo
- Mr. Popper's Penguins
- The Muppets
- New Year's Eve
- No Strings Attached
- Our Idiot Brother
- Paul
- Puss in Boots
- Rango
- Rio
- The Sitter
- The Smurfs
- Something Borrowed
- Spy Kids: All the Time in the World
- Stonerville
- Take Me Home Tonight
- Tower Heist
- A Very Harold & Kumar 3D Christmas
- We Bought a Zoo
- What's Your Number?
- Win Win
- Winnie the Pooh
- Your Highness
- Zookeeper

==== 2012 ====
- 21 Jump Street
- A Thousand Words
- American Reunion
- The Babymakers
- Bachelorette
- Breaking Wind
- The Campaign
- Casa de mi padre
- A Christmas Story 2
- Dark Shadows
- The Dictator
- Exit Strategy
- The First Time
- The Five-Year Engagement
- For a Good Time, Call...
- Frankenweenie
- Friends with Kids
- Fun Size
- The Guilt Trip
- Here Comes the Boom
- Hotel Transylvania
- I Heart Shakey
- Ice Age: Continental Drift
- Jeff, Who Lives at Home
- Joyful Noise
- Lola Versus
- The Lorax
- Madagascar 3: Europe's Most Wanted
- Madea's Witness Protection
- Men in Black 3
- One for the Money
- One Small Hitch
- ParaNorman
- Parental Guidance
- Pitch Perfect
- Playing for Keeps
- Project X
- Ruby Sparks
- Safety Not Guaranteed
- Secret of the Wings
- Seeking a Friend for the End of the World
- Seven Psychopaths
- Silver Linings Playbook
- Ted
- Thanks for Sharing
- That's My Boy
- The Three Stooges
- Think Like a Man
- This Is 40
- This Means War
- Tim and Eric's Billion Dollar Movie
- To Rome with Love
- Vamps
- Wanderlust
- The Watch
- Wreck-It Ralph

==== 2013 ====
- 3 Geezers!
- 21 and Over
- Admission
- American Hustle
- Anchorman 2: The Legend Continues
- Are You Here
- Bad Milo!
- The Big Wedding
- Baggage Claim
- The Brass Teapot
- Clear History
- Cloudy with a Chance of Meatballs 2
- The Croods
- Delivery Man
- Despicable Me 2
- Don Jon
- Drinking Buddies
- Enough Said
- The Family
- Family Weekend
- Free Birds
- Frozen
- Girl Most Likely
- Grown Ups 2
- Grudge Match
- The Hangover Part III
- A Haunted House
- The Heat
- Her
- I Give It a Year
- Identity Thief
- In a World...
- Inappropriate Comedy
- The Incredible Burt Wonderstone
- The Internship
- Jackass Presents: Bad Grandpa
- John Dies at the End
- Kick-Ass 2
- Last Vegas
- Life of Crime
- Machete Kills
- A Madea Christmas
- Monsters University
- Movie 43
- Pain & Gain
- Peeples
- Planes
- Rapture-Palooza
- R.I.P.D.
- Scary Movie 5
- The Smurfs 2
- Some Girl(s)
- The Starving Games
- The To Do List
- This Is the End
- Turbo
- Warm Bodies
- The Way, Way Back
- We're the Millers
- The Wolf of Wall Street

==== 2014 ====
- 22 Jump Street
- About Last Night
- Adult Beginners
- Alexander and the Terrible, Horrible, No Good, Very Bad Day
- The Angriest Man in Brooklyn
- Annie
- Bad Words
- Behaving Badly
- Big Hero 6
- Birdman
- Blended
- Chef
- Date and Switch
- Dear White People
- Dumbbells
- Dumb and Dumber To
- The Grand Budapest Hotel
- Happy Christmas
- A Haunted House 2
- Horrible Bosses 2
- How to Train Your Dragon 2
- The Hungover Games
- The Interview
- Jingle All the Way 2
- Kingsman: The Secret Service
- Laggies
- The Lego Movie
- Let's Be Cops
- Life After Beth
- Lust for Love
- Magic in the Moonlight
- A Merry Friggin' Christmas
- A Million Ways to Die in the West
- Moms' Night Out
- Mr. Peabody & Sherman
- Muppets Most Wanted
- Neighbors
- Night at the Museum: Secret of the Tomb
- Not Cool
- The Nut Job
- Obvious Child
- The Other Woman
- Paddington
- Penguins of Madagascar
- Playing It Cool
- Ride Along
- Rio 2
- Saving Christmas
- School Dance
- Search Party
- Sex Tape
- The Single Moms Club
- The Skeleton Twins
- Someone Marry Barry
- St. Vincent
- Tammy
- That Awkward Moment
- They Came Together
- Think Like a Man Too
- Top Five
- Veronica Mars
- Walk of Shame

==== 2015 ====
- Absolutely Anything
- Accidental Love
- Addicted to Fresno
- Aloha
- Alvin and the Chipmunks: The Road Chip
- Barely Lethal
- Daddy's Home
- Danny Collins
- The D Train
- The DUFF
- Entourage
- Get Hard
- The Good Dinosaur
- Goosebumps
- Home
- Home Sweet Hell
- Hot Pursuit
- Hot Tub Time Machine 2
- Hotel Transylvania 2
- Inside Out
- The Intern
- Irrational Man
- Kitchen Sink
- Krampus
- The Last 5 Years
- Love, Rosie
- Love the Coopers
- The Man from U.N.C.L.E.
- Minions
- Mortdecai
- Mr. Right
- The Night Before
- Our Brand Is Crisis
- The Overnight
- Paper Towns
- Paul Blart: Mall Cop 2
- The Peanuts Movie
- Pitch Perfect 2
- Pixels
- Ricki and the Flash
- The Ridiculous 6
- Rock the Kasbah
- Scouts Guide to the Zombie Apocalypse
- She's Funny That Way
- Sisters
- Sleeping with Other People
- The SpongeBob Movie: Sponge Out of Water
- Spy
- Ted 2
- Trainwreck
- Unfinished Business
- The Wedding Ringer
- Vacation
- A Very Murray Christmas

==== 2016 ====
- Absolutely Fabulous: The Movie
- Almost Christmas
- The Angry Birds Movie
- Bad Moms
- Bad Santa 2
- Barbershop: The Next Cut
- Boo! A Madea Halloween
- The Boss
- The Bounce Back
- Bridget Jones's Baby
- The Bronze
- Central Intelligence
- The Cleanse
- Deadpool
- The Do-Over
- Dirty Grandpa
- The Edge of Seventeen
- Everybody Wants Some!!
- Fifty Shades of Black
- Finding Dory
- Get a Job
- Ghostbusters
- The Brothers Grimsby
- Hail, Caesar!
- Hello, My Name is Doris
- How to Be Single
- Ice Age: Collision Course
- Joshy
- Keanu
- Keeping Up with the Joneses
- Kung Fu Panda 3
- La La Land
- Masterminds
- Meet the Blacks
- Middle School: The Worst Years of My Life
- Mike and Dave Need Wedding Dates
- Moana
- Mother's Day
- Mr. Right
- My Blind Brother
- Neighbors 2: Sorority Rising
- Nerdland
- The Nice Guys
- Nine Lives
- Norm of the North
- Office Christmas Party
- Pee-wee's Big Holiday
- The Perfect Match
- Popstar: Never Stop Never Stopping
- Punching Henry
- Ride Along 2
- The Ridiculous 6
- Sausage Party
- The Secret Life of Pets
- Sing
- Storks
- Swiss Army Man
- Trolls
- True Memoirs of an International Assassin
- War Dogs
- Why Him?
- Zoolander 2
- Zootopia

==== 2017 ====
- The Babysitter
- A Bad Moms Christmas
- Battle of the Sexes
- Baywatch
- The Big Sick
- Boo 2! A Madea Halloween
- The Boss Baby
- Captain Underpants: The First Epic Movie
- Cars 3
- CHiPs
- Coco
- Crash Pad
- Daddy's Home 2
- Dean
- Despicable Me 3
- Diary of a Wimpy Kid: The Long Haul
- A Dog's Purpose
- Downsizing
- The Emoji Movie
- Father Figures
- Ferdinand
- Fist Fight
- Fun Mom Dinner
- Girls Trip
- Going in Style
- Happy Death Day
- The Hitman's Bodyguard
- Home Again
- Hotel Transylvania 3: Summer Vacation
- The House
- How to Be a Latin Lover
- I, Tonya
- Ingrid Goes West
- Jumanji: Welcome to the Jungle
- Just Getting Started
- Killing Gunther
- Kingsman: The Golden Circle
- The Layover
- The Lego Batman Movie
- The Little Hours
- Little Evil
- Logan Lucky
- The Lovers
- Monster Trucks
- My Entire High School Sinking into the Sea
- The Nut Job 2: Nutty by Nature
- Pitch Perfect 3
- Pottersville
- Rough Night
- Sandy Wexler
- Skin: The Movie
- Smurfs: The Lost Village
- Snatched
- Table 19
- Wilson
- Woody Woodpecker

==== 2018 ====
- Action Point
- Alex Strangelove
- An Evening with Beverly Luff Linn
- Blockers
- Blindspotting
- Book Club
- Boundaries
- Can You Ever Forgive Me?
- Candy Jar
- The Christmas Chronicles
- Christopher Robin
- The Con Is On
- Crazy Rich Asians
- Deadpool 2
- Dude
- Father of the Year
- Game Night
- Game Over, Man!
- Goosebumps 2: Haunted Halloween
- The Grinch
- Gringo
- The Happytime Murders
- Holmes & Watson
- Hotel Transylvania 3: Summer Vacation
- The House with a Clock in Its Walls
- Ibiza
- I Feel Pretty
- Incredibles 2
- Instant Family
- Johnny English Strikes Again
- Juliet, Naked
- The Kissing Booth
- Life of the Party
- Like Father
- Love, Simon
- Mamma Mia! Here We Go Again
- Mary Poppins Returns
- Most Likely to Murder
- Nappily Ever After
- Night School
- Nobody's Fool
- The Nutcracker and the Four Realms
- The Oath
- Ocean's 8
- Overboard
- The Package
- Paddington 2
- Peter Rabbit
- The Princess Switch
- Ralph Breaks the Internet
- The Samuel Project
- Second Act
- Set It Up
- Seven Stages to Achieve Eternal Bliss
- Sherlock Gnomes
- Show Dogs
- Sierra Burgess Is a Loser
- The Spy Who Dumped Me
- Super Troopers 2
- Tag
- Teen Titans Go! To the Movies
- To All the Boys I've Loved Before
- Tully
- Uncle Drew
- The Week Of
- When We First Met

==== 2019 ====
- Abominable
- The Addams Family
- Airplane Mode
- Always Be My Maybe
- The Angry Birds Movie 2
- The Art of Self-Defense
- The Beach Bum
- Booksmart
- Brittany Runs a Marathon
- Buffaloed
- Charlie's Angels
- The Day Shall Come
- The Dead Don't Die
- Detective Pikachu
- Dolemite Is My Name
- Dora and the Lost City of Gold
- Drunk Parents
- Fighting with My Family
- Good Boys
- Grand-Daddy Day Care
- Happy Death Day 2U
- Hobbs & Shaw
- The Hustle
- Isn't It Romantic
- Jay and Silent Bob Reboot
- Jexi
- Jojo Rabbit
- Jumanji: The Next Level
- Klaus
- Knives Out
- The Lego Movie 2: The Second Part
- Last Christmas
- Late Night
- The Last Laugh
- Let It Snow
- Little
- Long Shot
- Loqueesha
- A Madea Family Funeral
- Men in Black: International
- Missing Link
- Murder Mystery
- Noelle
- Once Upon a Time in Hollywood
- Otherhood
- The Perfect Date
- Playing with Fire
- Poms
- The Secret Life of Pets 2
- A Rainy Day in New York
- Ready or Not
- Sextuplets
- Shaft
- Shazam!
- Someone Great
- Spies in Disguise
- Stuber
- Sword of Trust
- Tall Girl
- Toy Story 4
- UglyDolls
- Undercover Brother 2
- Unicorn Store
- The Upside
- What Men Want
- Where'd You Go, Bernadette
- Wine Country
- Wonder Park
- Yesterday
- Zombieland: Double Tap

=== 2020s ===
==== 2020 ====
- An American Pickle
- Bad Boys for Life
- Bad Therapy
- Bad Trip
- Bill & Ted Face the Music
- Birds of Prey (and the Fantabulous Emancipation of One Harley Quinn)
- The Broken Hearts Gallery
- The Christmas Chronicles 2
- The Croods: A New Age
- Dolittle
- Downhill
- Freaky
- Friendsgiving
- Friend of the World
- Godmothered
- Half Brothers
- Happiest Season
- Holidate
- Hooking Up
- Hubie Halloween
- Irresistible
- Kajillionaire
- The King of Staten Island
- The Kissing Booth 2
- Like a Boss
- The Lovebirds
- Love, Guaranteed
- The Main Event
- My Spy
- On the Rocks
- Onward
- Palm Springs
- Reboot Camp
- Scoob!
- Sister of the Groom
- The Sleepover
- Sonic the Hedgehog
- Soul
- Spenser Confidential
- The SpongeBob Movie: Sponge on the Run
- Spy Intervention
- The Stand In
- Superintelligence
- The Thing About Harry
- Trolls World Tour
- To All the Boys: P.S. I Still Love You
- Valley Girl
- The War with Grandpa
- The Willoughbys
- The Witches
- Work It
- The Wrong Missy

==== 2021 ====
- 8-Bit Christmas
- The Addams Family 2
- Afterlife of the Party
- Aquarium of the Dead
- America: The Motion Picture
- Bad Trip
- Barb and Star Go to Vista Del Mar
- Benny Loves You
- The Boss Baby: Family Business
- Breaking News in Yuba County
- Clifford the Big Red Dog
- Coming 2 America
- Cruella
- Diary of a Wimpy Kid
- Don't Look Up
- Dream Horse
- Encanto
- Extinct
- Fatherhood
- Finding You
- Flora & Ulysses
- Free Guy
- French Exit
- Ghostbusters: Afterlife
- Good on Paper
- Happily
- He's All That
- Here Today
- Hitman's Wife's Bodyguard
- Home Sweet Home Alone
- The House Next Door: Meet the Blacks 2
- How It Ends
- I Care a Lot
- Jungle Cruise
- Lady of the Manor
- Long Weekend
- Locked Down
- The Loud House Movie
- The Map of Tiny Perfect Things
- The Mitchells vs. the Machines
- Moxie
- The Paper Tigers
- Peter Rabbit 2: The Runaway
- Plan B
- Queenpins
- Red Notice
- Red Rocket
- Ride the Eagle
- Ron's Gone Wrong
- Rumble
- Senior Moment
- Shiva Baby
- Sing 2
- Space Jam: A New Legacy
- The Starling
- The Suicide Squad
- Supercool
- Thunder Force
- Together Together
- Tom & Jerry
- To All the Boys: Always and Forever
- Trouble
- The Ultimate Playlist of Noise
- Vacation Friends
- Vivo
- We Broke Up
- Werewolves Within
- Willy's Wonderland
- Wish Dragon
- Yes Day

==== 2022 ====
- The Adam Project
- Amsterdam
- Apollo 10 1/2: A Space Age Childhood
- The Bad Guys
- Bar Fight!
- Beavis and Butt-Head Do the Universe
- Better Nate Than Ever
- The Bob's Burgers Movie
- Bros
- The Bubble
- Bullet Train
- Cheaper by the Dozen
- Chip 'n Dale: Rescue Rangers
- A Christmas Story Christmas
- Confess, Fletch
- Crush
- The Curse of Bridge Hollow
- DC League of Super-Pets
- Disenchanted
- Dog
- Do Revenge
- Doula
- Easter Sunday
- Everything Everywhere All at Once
- Family Camp
- Falling for Christmas
- Fire Island
- Glass Onion: A Knives Out Mystery
- The Good House
- The Greatest Beer Run Ever
- Hocus Pocus 2
- Home Team
- Hotel Transylvania: Transformania
- Hundreds of Beavers
- The Hyperions
- I Want You Back
- The Ice Age Adventures of Buck Wild
- Jackass Forever
- The Lost City
- Luck
- Lyle, Lyle, Crocodile
- A Madea Homecoming
- A Man Called Otto
- The Man from Toronto
- Marmaduke
- Marry Me
- Me Time
- Metal Lords
- Minions: The Rise of Gru
- Moonshot
- The Munsters
- Night at the Museum: Kahmunrah Rises Again
- The People We Hate at the Wedding
- On the Count of Three
- Paws of Fury: The Legend of Hank
- Puss in Boots: The Last Wish
- Rosaline
- Secret Headquarters
- Senior Year
- Slayers
- Sneakerella
- Sonic the Hedgehog 2
- Spin Me Round
- Spirited
- Studio 666
- Tall Girl 2
- Ticket to Paradise
- Turning Red
- The Unbearable Weight of Massive Talent
- Unplugging
- The Valet
- Vengeance
- Violent Night
- Wendell & Wild
- When You Finish Saving the World
- White Noise

==== 2023 ====
- 80 for Brady
- About My Father
- Ant-Man and the Wasp: Quantumania
- Anyone but You
- Are You There God? It's Me, Margaret
- Asteroid City
- Back on the Strip
- Barbie
- The Beanie Bubble
- Biosphere
- The Blackening
- Bottoms
- Camp Hideout
- Candy Cane Lane
- Champions
- Cocaine Bear
- Cora Bora
- Corner Office
- Dashing Through the Snow
- Down Low
- Dumb Money
- The Family Plan
- Family Switch
- First Time Female Director
- Fool's Paradise
- Freelance
- Genie
- Ghosted
- Good Burger 2
- Haunted Mansion
- Hemet, or the Landlady Don't Drink Tea
- The Holdovers
- House Party
- Joy Ride
- Jules
- The Kill Room
- Leo
- Life Upside Down
- A Little White Lie
- The Machine
- Mafia Mamma
- Maybe I Do
- Migration
- Moving On
- Murder Mystery 2
- My Big Fat Greek Wedding 3
- No Hard Feelings
- Old Dads
- Operation Fortune: Ruse de Guerre
- The Other Zoey
- The Out-Laws
- Please Don't Destroy: The Treasure of Foggy Mountain
- The Plus One
- Poolman
- Quiz Lady
- Red, White & Royal Blue
- The Re-Education of Molly Singer
- Renfield
- The Retirement Plan
- Robots
- Ruby Gillman, Teenage Kraken
- Self Reliance
- Shazam! Fury of the Gods
- Shortcomings
- Shotgun Wedding
- Sick Girl
- Sitting in Bars with Cake
- Spy Kids: Armageddon
- Strays
- The Super Mario Bros. Movie
- Teenage Mutant Ninja Turtles: Mutant Mayhem
- Totally Killer
- Trolls Band Together
- Vacation Friends 2
- What Happens Later
- White Men Can't Jump
- Wonka
- Your Place or Mine
- You Are So Not Invited to My Bat Mitzvah
- You Hurt My Feelings
- You People
- Zoey 102

==== 2024 ====
- The 4:30 Movie
- Almost Popular
- And Mrs
- Argylle
- Babes
- Bad Boys: Ride or Die
- Between the Temples
- Beetlejuice Beetlejuice
- The Best Christmas Pageant Ever
- Between the Temples
- Beverly Hills Cop: Axel F
- Borderlands
- Brothers
- The Casagrandes Movie
- Chosen Family
- Christmas Eve in Miller's Point
- Deadpool & Wolverine
- Dear Santa
- Despicable Me 4
- Don't Tell Mom the Babysitter's Dead
- Drive-Away Dolls
- Drugstore June
- F*** Marry Kill
- The Fabulous Four
- The Fall Guy
- A Family Affair
- Fly Me to the Moon
- The Garfield Movie
- Ghostbusters: Frozen Empire
- Goodrich
- Greedy People
- The Gutter
- Harold and the Purple Crayon
- Hitpig!
- Hot Frosty
- IF
- Incoming
- Inside Out 2
- Irish Wish
- Jackpot
- The Killer's Game
- Kinds of Kindness
- Kung Fu Panda 4
- The Idea of You
- Lift
- Lisa Frankenstein
- Lousy Carter
- Mean Girls
- Mother of the Bride
- My Old Ass
- My Spy: The Eternal City
- Not Another Church Movie
- Nutcrackers
- Old Guy
- Orion and the Dark
- Our Little Secret
- Players
- Poolman
- The Present
- Problemista
- Prom Dates
- A Real Pain
- Red One
- Reunion
- Role Play
- Saturday Night
- Saving Bikini Bottom: The Sandy Cheeks Movie
- Snack Shack
- Sonic the Hedgehog 3
- Space Cadet
- Spellbound
- A Sudden Case of Christmas
- Summer Camp
- Sweethearts
- Thelma
- The Underdoggs
- Unfrosted
- The Union
- We Live in Time
- Wicked
- Wolfs
- Woody Woodpecker Goes to Camp
- Y2K

==== 2025 ====
- A Tree Fell in the Woods
- Adulthood
- Alexander and the Terrible, Horrible, No Good, Very Bad Road Trip
- All-Star Weekend
- Anaconda
- Back in Action
- The Bad Guys 2
- Bridget Jones: Mad About the Boy
- Bob Trevino Likes It
- Borderline
- Bride Hard
- Bugonia
- Caught Stealing
- Code 3
- The Day the Earth Blew Up: A Looney Tunes Movie
- Death of a Unicorn
- Die My Love
- Dog Man
- Doin' It
- Dora and the Search for Sol Dorado
- Ella McCay
- Eternity
- Fight or Flight
- Fixed
- Freakier Friday
- Freaky Tales
- Friendship
- Gabby's Dollhouse: The Movie
- Good Fortune
- Happy Gilmore 2
- Heads of State
- Heart Eyes
- Honey Don't!
- I Don't Understand You
- Is This Thing On?
- Jay Kelly
- Jingle Bell Heist
- Kinda Pregnant
- The Life List
- Lilo & Stitch
- London Calling
- Love Hurts
- Maddie's Secret
- Madea's Destination Wedding
- Magic Farm
- Marty Supreme
- Materialists
- A Merry Little Ex-Mas
- Mickey 17
- A Minecraft Movie
- The Monkey
- My Mother's Wedding
- My Oxford Year
- The Naked Gun
- Nonnas
- Novocaine
- Oh, Hi!
- Oh. What. Fun.
- Old Guy
- One Battle After Another
- One of Them Days
- The Parenting
- The Phoenician Scheme
- The Pickup
- Plankton: The Movie
- Playdate
- Rental Family
- Riff Raff
- Roofman
- The Roses
- Sacramento
- Screamboat
- Sketch
- Smurfs
- Sneaks
- Spinal Tap II: The End Continues
- Splitsville
- The SpongeBob Movie: Search for SquarePants
- Stealing Pulp Fiction
- Summer of 69
- Twinless
- The Twits
- A Very Jonas Christmas Movie
- The Wedding Banquet
- Wake Up Dead Man
- The Wrong Paris
- You're Cordially Invited
- Zootopia 2

==== 2026 ====
- 72 Hours
- The Angry Birds Movie 3
- Basic
- Bad Day
- The Breadwinner
- Brian
- Buddy
- The Cat in the Hat
- Chili Finger
- The Christophers
- Coyote vs. Acme
- The Devil Wears Prada 2
- Digger
- The Dink
- Double Trouble
- Driver's Ed
- Focker-in-Law
- Forgotten Island
- F*ck Valentine's Day
- Gail Daughtry and the Celebrity Sex Pass
- Goat
- Hoppers
- How to Rob a Bank
- The Invite
- I Love Boosters
- I Want Your Sex
- Idiots
- In Memoriam
- Influenced
- Italianna
- Jackass: Best and Last
- Joe's College Road Trip
- Jumanji: Open World
- Kill Me
- Ladies First
- Little Brother
- Loves Company
- The Man with the Bag
- Matchbox
- Mayday
- Mermaid
- Mike & Nick & Nick & Alice
- Minions & Monsters
- The Musical
- Never Change!
- Nimrods
- Nutmeg & Mistletoe
- Office Romance
- One Night Only
- Outcome
- Over Your Dead Body
- People We Meet on Vacation
- Pizza Movie
- Practical Magic 2
- Rolling Loud
- Roommates
- Scary Movie
- The Sheep Detectives
- Spa Weekend
- Stop! That! Train!
- The Super Mario Galaxy Movie
- Super Troopers 3
- Swapped
- Toy Story 5
- Violent Night 2
- Whitney Springs
- The Wrecking Crew
- The Wrong Girls
- You're Dating a Narcissist!

==== 2027 ====
- 4 Kids Walk Into a Bank
- Animal Friends
- Air Bud Returns
- Bad Fairies
- Beach Read
- Buds
- The Catch
- Drag
- Family Movie
- Gatto
- Gremlins 3
- The Haunting of Hotel Transylvania
- Ice Age: Boiling Point
- Jason Statham Stole My Bike
- Margie Claus
- A Minecraft Movie Squared
- Naughty
- The New Simpsons Movie
- Not Alone
- Untitled Ocean's Eleven prequel
- Paris Paramount
- Poetic License
- Romy and Michele 2
- Shrek 5
- Sonic the Hedgehog 4
- Spaceballs: The New One
- Wishful Thinking
