= Why Men Work =

1924 film

- Directed by: Leo McCarey
- Produced by: Hal Roach
- Starring: Charley Chase
- Release date: August 31, 1924
- Country: United States
- Languages: Silent; English intertitles

Why Men Work is a 1924 short comedy film featuring Charley Chase, directed by Leo McCarey The Los Angeles Times described it as "the adventures of an amateur news-reel photographer when he attempts to take some pictures of a visiting governor".

== Cast ==
- Charley Chase
- Olive Borden
- Billy Engle
- William Gillespie
- Katherine Grant
- Earl Mohan

== See also ==
- List of United States comedy films
