= Puddle Cruiser =

- DVD cover.
- Directed by: Jay Chandrasekhar
- Written by: Broken Lizard
- Produced by: Richard Perello
- Starring: Jay Chandrasekhar; Kevin Heffernan; Steve Lemme; Paul Soter; Erik Stolhanske
- Cinematography: Tony Foresta
- Edited by: Jay Chandrasekhar (Note: Credited in the film as "Jumbulingam"); Kevin Heffernan
- Music by: Jim Kremens
- Distributed by: 20th Century Fox
- Release date: 1996
- Running time: 102 minutes
- Country: United States
- Language: English
- Budget: $160,000

Puddle Cruiser is a 1996 American comedy film, the first full-length film created by the Broken Lizard comedy group. It premiered at the Hamptons International Film Festival, then went on to play at the Sundance Film Festival. The movie was filmed entirely on the campus of Colgate University, the alma mater of all five members of the comedy quintet. It was released on DVD in December 2005; the disc also features a 17-minute documentary called Rodeo Clowns on the marketing of Puddle Cruiser and Super Troopers with free previews on college campuses and using specially-painted tour buses. The extras and actors are almost entirely friends, family and other alumni, due to the very tight budget of the film. The film is repeatedly shown on Comedy Central.

== Plot ==
While breaking in to the Coburn University dining hall, college friends Felix, (Steve Lemme), Matt (Paul Soter), and Grogan (Kevin Heffernan) are discovered by campus police. Felix manages to escape, but Matt and Grogan are caught, and await a disciplinary trial. Felix meets Suzanne (Kayren Butler), the student lawyer assigned to his friends' case, and begins a casual relationship with her. Suzanne is still dating her boyfriend, Traci (Jamison Selby), who is a rugby player at another school. Suzanne attempts to hide her relationship with Felix from Traci, causing Felix to sleep with Jennifer (Laura Arieh), another student. Suzanne becomes angry with Felix for pursuing another woman, while he insists that she is hypocritical, as she is still dating Traci. Matt and Grogan inform Suzanne that Felix was with them on the night they were caught breaking into the dining hall, forcing her to resign from the case, causing a guilty verdict and a community service sentence. Suzanne breaks up with Traci, only to find that he is scheduled to play against the Coburn rugby team. Suzanne begs Felix not to play in the upcoming game for his own safety and attempts to have him removed from the game by reporting his crime to campus police. The attempt is foiled when the players from both teams parody the climactic scene from Spartacus ("I'm Felix Bean!"). He succeeds in playing but is significantly injured by Traci who single-mindedly pursued him for the entire match. He is sentenced to community service during his recovery from the injuries. Felix and Suzanne admit that they love each other, as Felix begins carrying out his community service. Meanwhile, Matt, Grogan, and Freaky Reaky (Erik Stolhanske) are caught later that night stealing food from the kitchen.

== Cast ==
- Steve Lemme as Felix Bean
- Jay Chandrasekhar as Zach Strader
- Paul Soter as Matthew "Matt" Phister
- Kevin Heffernan as Bartholomew Grogan
- Erik Stolhanske as Sean "Freaky Reaky" Reaker
- Alison Clapp as Emily Cooper
- Kayren Butler as Suzanne McKenna
- Jamison Selby as Traci Shannon
- Laura Arieh as Jennifer Montgomery

== Accolades ==
It won the 1996 Golden Starfish Award at the 1996 Hamptons International Film Festival where it received a positive review from Variety (magazine) and split the award with Matt Mahurin's Mugshot.
