= Young America (1897 film) =

1897 short silent film

- Production company: American Mutoscope & Biograph Company
- Release date: 1897
- Running time: 188ft
- Country: United States

Young America is a 1897 American silent short comedy film. The film was taken near Buzzard's Bay.

== Plot ==
A couple love-making in a picturesque garden. A youngster spoils it all by tying a bunch of fire-crackers to the young man's coat tails, and setting them off, with comedic results.
