= The Dude's Experience with a Girl on a Tandem =

1898 silent short film

- Produced by: American Mutoscope and Biograph Company
- Release date: August 1898
- Country: United States
- Languages: Silent film; English intertitles

The Dude's Experience with a Girl on a Tandem, also known as The Dude and the Bathing Girl, is a silent, comedy film made in August 1898 by the American Mutoscope and Biograph Company. The film location was Far Rockaway, Queens, New York City, New York.

== Plot ==
The plot revolves around a young man on the beach who is persuaded to join a lady in a bathing costume on a tandem bicycle, during which she drives it into the water, when he is dragged off the tandem into the water by the other girls on the beach.
