= Cinema of the United States =

Cinema of the United States (Hollywood)
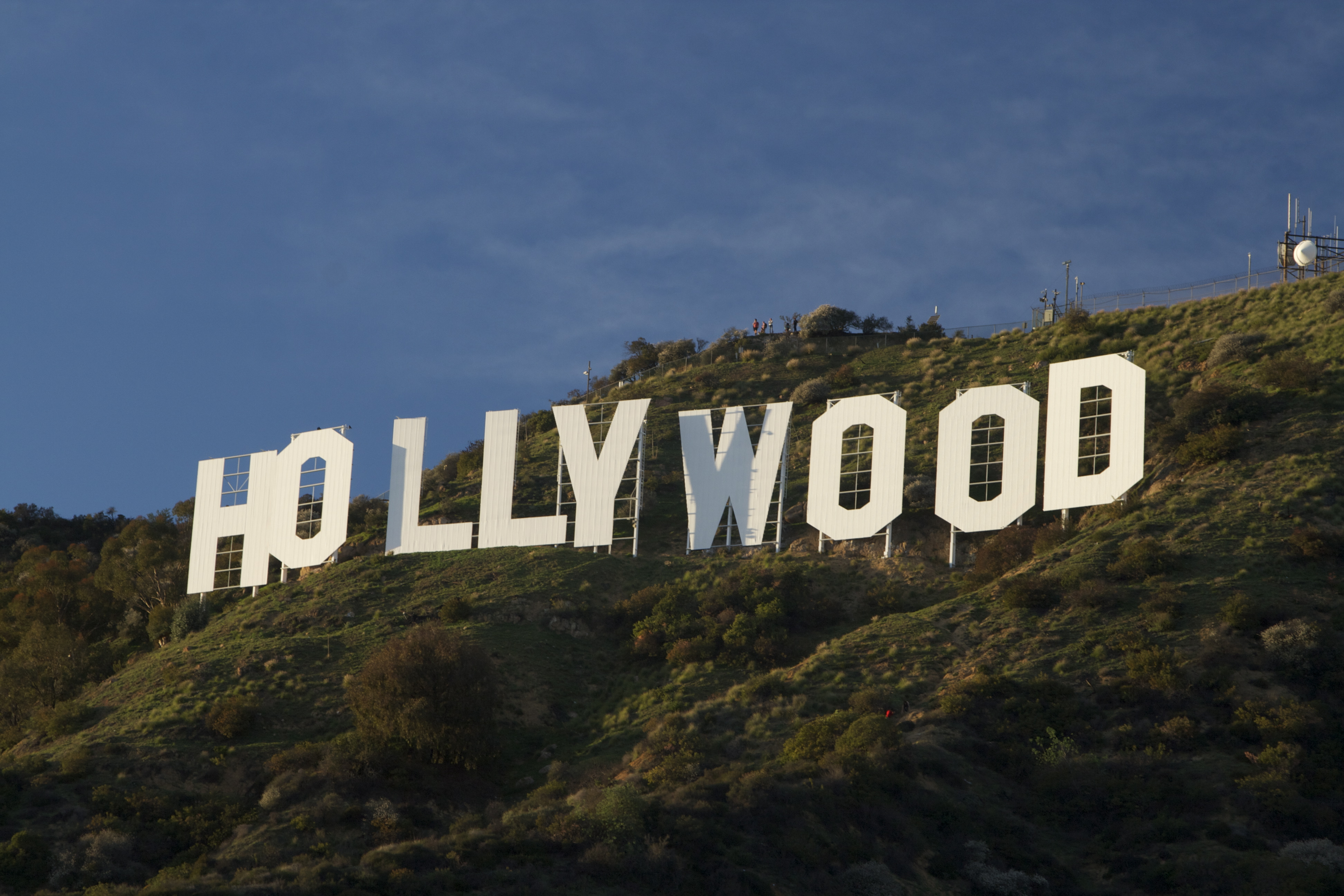
- The Hollywood Sign in the Hollywood Hills, often regarded as the symbol of the American film industry
- No. of screens: 40,393 (2017)
  - Per capita: 14 per 100,000 (2017)
- Main distributors: Walt Disney; Sony; Skydance; Universal

Produced feature films (2016)
- Fictional: 646 (98.5%)
- Animated: 10 (1.5%)

Number of admissions (2017)
- Total: 1,239,742,550
  - Per capita: 3.9 (2010)

Gross box office (2017)
- Total: $11.1 billion

The film industry of the United States, primarily associated with major film studios collectively referred to as "Hollywood", has significantly influenced the global film industry since the early 20th century.

Classical Hollywood cinema, a filmmaking style developed in the 1910s, continues to shape many American films today. While French filmmakers Auguste and Louis Lumière are often credited with modern cinema's origins, American filmmaking quickly rose to global dominance. As of 2024, the United States produced 544 national feature films, making it the world's fourth-largest film producer after India, Japan and China. Although the United Kingdom, Canada, Australia, and New Zealand also produce English-language films, they are not directly part of the Hollywood system. Due to this global reach, Hollywood is frequently regarded as a transnational cinema with some films released in multiple language versions, such as Spanish and French.

Contemporary Hollywood frequently outsources production to countries including the United Kingdom, Canada, Australia, and New Zealand. The four major film studios—Universal Pictures, Skydance Motion Picture Group, Walt Disney Studios, Sony Pictures—are media conglomerates that dominate American box office revenue and have produced some of the most commercially successful film and television programs worldwide. Adjusted for inflation, Gone with the Wind (1939) is the highest-grossing film of all time.

In 1894, the world's first commercial motion-picture exhibition was held in New York City using Thomas Edison's kinetoscope and kinetograph. In the following decades, the production of silent films greatly expanded. New studios formed, migrated to California, and began to create longer films. The United States produced the world's first sync-sound musical film, The Jazz Singer in 1927, and was at the forefront of sound-film development in the following decades.

Since the early 20th century, the American film industry has primarily been based in and around the thirty-mile zone, centered in the Hollywood neighborhood of Los Angeles County, California. The director D. W. Griffith was central to the development of a film grammar. Orson Welles's Citizen Kane (1941) is frequently cited in critics' polls as the greatest film of all time. Hollywood is widely regarded as the oldest hub of the film industry, where most of the earliest studios and production companies originated, and is the birthplace of numerous cinematic genres.

== History ==
=== Origins and Fort Lee ===
Animated sequence of a race horse galloping by Eadweard Muybridge

The earliest recorded instance of motion capture was Eadweard Muybridge’s series of photographs depicting a running horse, which he took in Palo Alto, California using a set of still cameras placed in a row. Muybridge's accomplishment led inventors everywhere to attempt to make similar devices. In the United States, Thomas Edison was among the first to produce such a device, the kinetoscope and kinetograph.

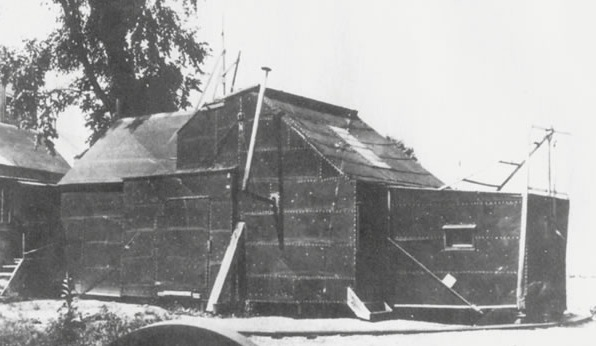
Thomas Edison's "Black Maria" film studio

The history of cinema in the United States can trace its roots to the East Coast, where, at one time, Fort Lee, New Jersey, was the motion-picture capital of America. The American film industry began at the end of the 19th century, with the construction of Thomas Edison's "Black Maria", the first motion-picture studio in West Orange, New Jersey. The cities and towns on the Hudson River and Hudson Palisades offered land at costs considerably less than New York City across the river and benefited greatly as a result of the phenomenal growth of the film industry at the turn of the 20th century.

The industry began attracting both capital and innovative work forces. In 1907, when the Kalem Company began using Fort Lee as a location for filming in the area, other filmmakers quickly followed. In 1909, a forerunner of Universal Studios, the Champion Film Company, built the first studio. Others quickly followed and either built new studios or leased facilities in Fort Lee. In the 1910s and 1920s, film companies such as the Independent Moving Pictures Company, Peerless Pictures Studios, Solax Studios, Eclair, Goldwyn Pictures Corporation, Star Film (Georges Méliès), World Film Company, Biograph Studios, Fox Film Corporation, Société Pathé Frères, Metro-Goldwyn-Mayer Studios Inc., Victor Film Company, and Selznick International Pictures were all making pictures in Fort Lee. Many notable actors, such as Mary Pickford, got their start at Biograph Studios.

In New York, the Kaufman Astoria Studios in Queens, which was built during the silent film era, was used by the Marx Brothers and W.C. Fields. The Edison Studios were located in the Bronx. Chelsea, Manhattan, was also frequently used.

Other Eastern cities, most notably Chicago and Cleveland, also served as early centers for film production.

In the West, California was already quickly emerging as a major film production center. In Colorado, Denver was home to the Art-O-Graf Film Company, and Walt Disney's early Laugh-O-Gram Studio was based in Kansas City, Missouri.

From 1908, Jacksonville, Florida's motion picture industry saw more than 30 silent film companies establish studios in town, including Kalem Studios, Metro Pictures (later MGM), Edison Studios, Majestic Films, King-Bee Films Corporation, Vim Comedy Company, Norman Studios, Gaumont and the Lubin Manufacturing Company.

Picture City, Florida was a planned site for a movie picture production center in the 1920s, but due to the 1928 Okeechobee hurricane, the idea collapsed and Picture City, Florida returned to its original name of Hobe Sound. An attempt to establish a film production center in Detroit also proved unsuccessful.

The film patent wars of the early 20th century helped the spread of film companies to other parts of the US, outside New York. Many filmmakers worked with equipment for which they did not own the rights to use. Therefore, filming in New York could be dangerous, as it was close to Edison's company headquarters and close to the agents the company sent out to seize cameras.

An alternative was Los Angeles, which had mild winters, a large selection of places to film, and, most importantly, it was only 90 miles to the border of Mexico, in case they needed to flee from Edison's enforcement agents. By 1912, most major film companies had set up production facilities in Southern California, near or in Los Angeles, because of the region's favorable year-round weather.

=== Rise of Hollywood ===
The 1908 Selig Polyscope Company production of The Count of Monte Cristo, directed by Francis Boggs and starring Hobart Bosworth, was claimed as the first to have been filmed in Los Angeles, in 1907. A plaque was unveiled by the city, in 1957, at Dearden's flagship store on the corner of Main Street and 7th Street, to mark the filming on the site when it had been a Chinese laundry. Bosworth's widow suggested the city had got the date and location wrong, and that the film was actually shot in nearby Venice, which at the time was an independent city. In the Sultan's Power, directed by Boggs for Selig Polyscope Company, also starring Bosworth, is considered the first film shot entirely in Los Angeles, with shooting at 7th and Olive Streets, in 1909.

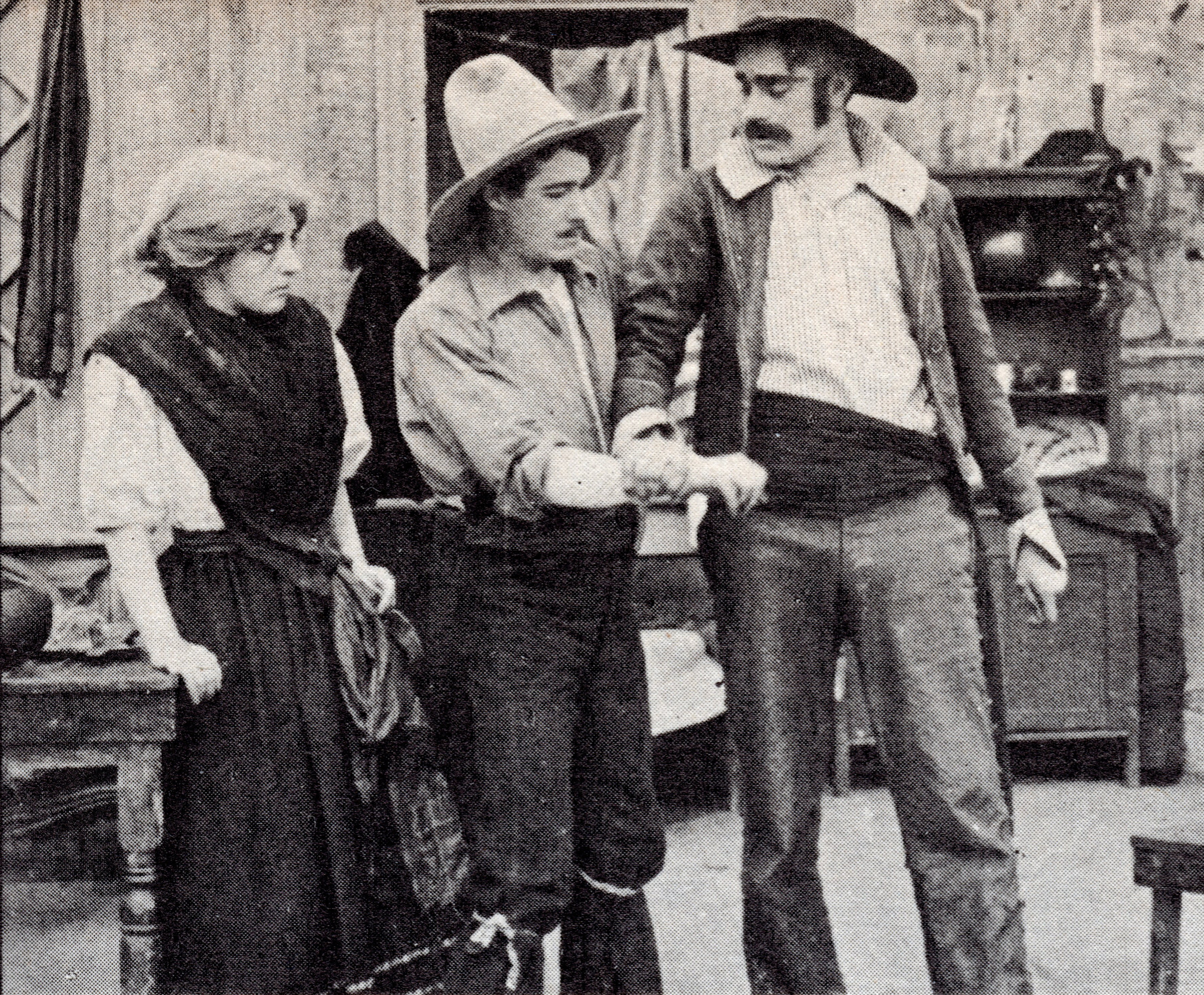
In Old California (1910), the first film to be produced in Hollywood, California

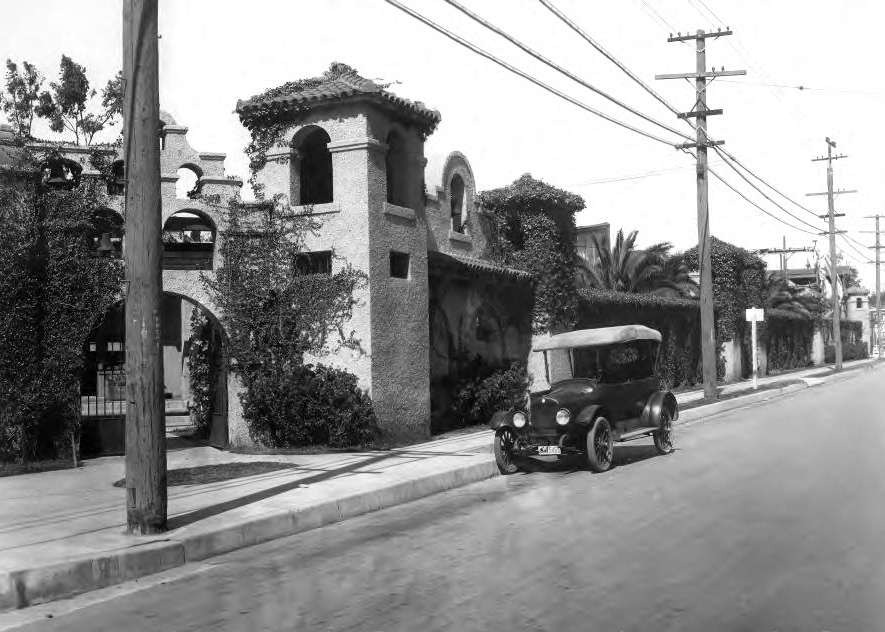
Selig Polyscope Company studio, the first film studio in the Los Angeles area

In early 1910, director D. W. Griffith was sent by the Biograph Company to the West Coast with his acting troupe, consisting of actors Blanche Sweet, Lillian Gish, Mary Pickford, Lionel Barrymore, and others. They started filming on a vacant lot near Georgia Street in downtown Los Angeles. While there, the company decided to explore new territories, traveling several miles north to Hollywood: a little village that was friendly and enjoyed the movie company filming there. Griffith then filmed the first movie ever shot in Hollywood, In Old California, a Biograph melodrama about California in the 19th century, when the state was under Mexican rule. Griffith stayed there for months and made several films before returning to New York. Also in 1910, Selig Polyscope Company of Chicago established the first film studio in the Los Angeles area in Edendale, and the first studio in Hollywood opened in 1912. After hearing about Griffith's success in Hollywood, in 1913, many movie-makers headed west to avoid the fees imposed by Thomas Edison, who owned patents on the movie-making process. Nestor Studios of Bayonne, New Jersey, built the first studio in the Hollywood neighborhood in 1911. Nestor Studios, owned by David and William Horsley, later merged with Universal Studios; and William Horsley's other company, Hollywood Film Laboratory, is now the oldest existing company in Hollywood, presently called the Hollywood Digital Laboratory. California's more hospitable and cost-effective climate led to the eventual shift of virtually all filmmaking to the West Coast by the 1930s. At the time, Thomas Edison owned almost all the patents relevant to motion picture production and movie producers on the East Coast acting independently of Edison's Motion Picture Patents Company were often sued or enjoined by Edison and his agents while movie makers working on the West Coast could work independently of Edison's control.

In Los Angeles, the studios and Hollywood grew. Before World War I, films were made in several American cities, but filmmakers tended to gravitate towards southern California as the industry developed. They were attracted by the warm, predictable climate with reliable sunlight, which made it possible to film outdoors year-round. War damage contributed to the decline of the then-dominant European film industry, in favor of the United States, where infrastructure was still intact. The stronger early public health response to the 1918 flu epidemic by Los Angeles compared to other American cities reduced the number of cases there and resulted in a faster recovery, contributing to the increasing dominance of Hollywood over New York City. During the pandemic, public health officials temporarily closed movie theaters in some jurisdictions, large studios suspended production for weeks at a time, and some actors came down with the flu. This caused major financial losses and severe difficulties for small studios, but the industry as a whole more than recovered during the Roaring Twenties.

In the early 20th century, when the medium was new, many Jewish immigrants found employment in the US film industry. They were able to make their mark in a brand-new business: the exhibition of short films in storefront theaters called nickelodeons, after their admission price of a nickel (five cents). Within a few years, men like Samuel Goldwyn, William Fox, Carl Laemmle, Adolph Zukor, Louis B. Mayer, and the Warner Brothers (Harry, Albert, Samuel, and Jack) had switched to the production side of the business. Soon they were the heads of a new kind of enterprise: the movie studio. The US had at least two female directors, producers, and studio heads in these early years: Lois Weber and French-born Alice Guy-Blaché. They also set the stage for the industry's internationalism; the industry is often accused of Amerocentric provincialism.

Other movie producers arrived from Europe after World War I: directors like Ernst Lubitsch, Alfred Hitchcock, Fritz Lang and Jean Renoir; and actors like Rudolph Valentino, Marlene Dietrich, Ronald Colman, and Charles Boyer. They joined a homegrown supply of actors—lured west from the New York City stage after the introduction of sound films—to form one of the 20th century's most remarkable growth industries. At motion pictures' height of popularity in the mid-1940s, the studios were cranking out a total of about 400 movies a year, seen by an audience of 90 million Americans per week.

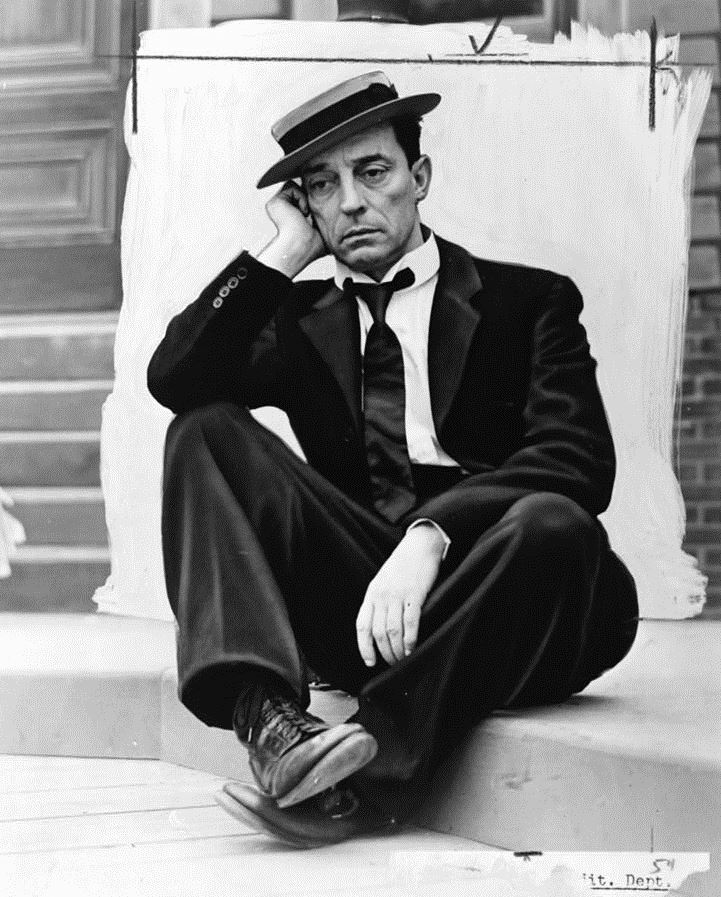
Buster Keaton in costume with his signature pork pie hat, c. 1939

Sound also became widely used in Hollywood in the late 1920s. After The Jazz Singer, the first film with synchronized voices was successfully released as a Vitaphone talkie in 1927, Hollywood film companies would respond to Warner Bros. and begin to use Vitaphone sound—which Warner Bros. owned until 1928—in future films. By May 1928, Electrical Research Product Incorporated (ERPI), a subsidiary of the Western Electric company, had a monopoly over film sound distribution.

A side effect of these "talkies" was that many actors who had made their careers in silent films suddenly found themselves out of work, as they often had bad voices or could not remember their lines. Meanwhile, in 1922, US politician Will H. Hays left politics and formed the movie studio boss organization known as the Motion Picture Producers and Distributors of America (MPPDA). The organization became the Motion Picture Association of America after Hays retired in 1945.

In the early times of talkies, American studios found that their sound productions were rejected in foreign-language markets and even among speakers of other dialects of English. The synchronization technology was still too primitive for dubbing. One of the solutions was creating parallel foreign-language versions of Hollywood films. Around 1930, the American companies opened a studio in Joinville-le-Pont, France, where the same sets and wardrobe and even mass scenes were used for different time-sharing crews.

Also, foreign unemployed actors, playwrights, and winners of photogenic contests were chosen and brought to Hollywood, where they shot parallel versions of English-language films. These parallel versions had a lower budget, were shot at night, and were directed by second-line American directors who did not speak a foreign language. The Spanish-language crews included people like Luis Buñuel, Enrique Jardiel Poncela, Xavier Cugat, and Edgar Neville. The productions were not very successful in their intended markets, due to the following reasons:

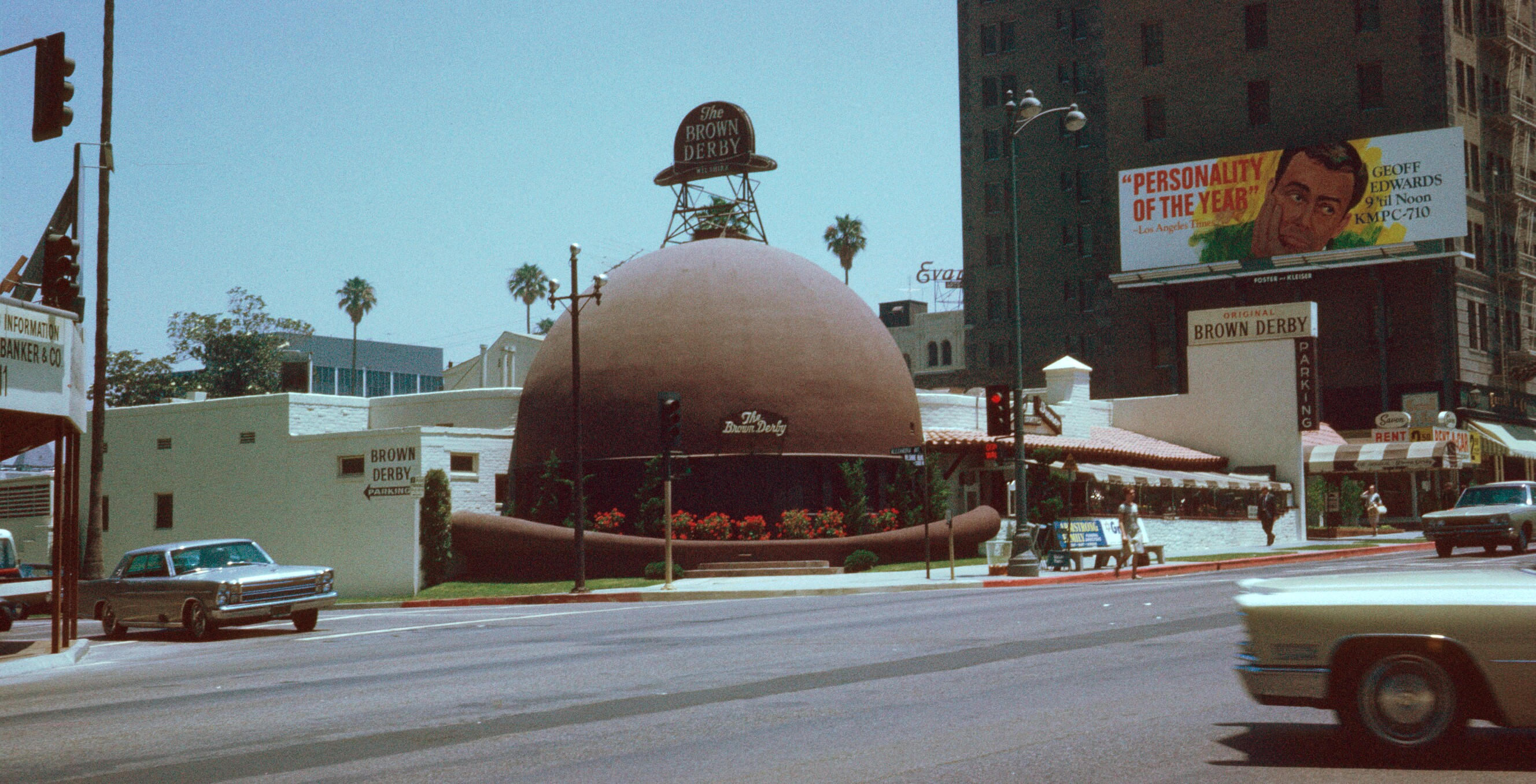
Brown Derby, an icon that became synonymous with the Golden Age of Hollywood.

- The lower budgets were apparent.
- Many theater actors had no previous experience in cinema.
- The original movies were often second-rate themselves since studios expected that the top productions would sell by themselves.
- The mix of foreign accents (Castilian, Mexican, and Chilean for example in the Spanish case) was odd for the audiences.
- Some markets lacked sound-equipped theaters.

=== Classical Hollywood Cinema and the Golden Age of Hollywood ===
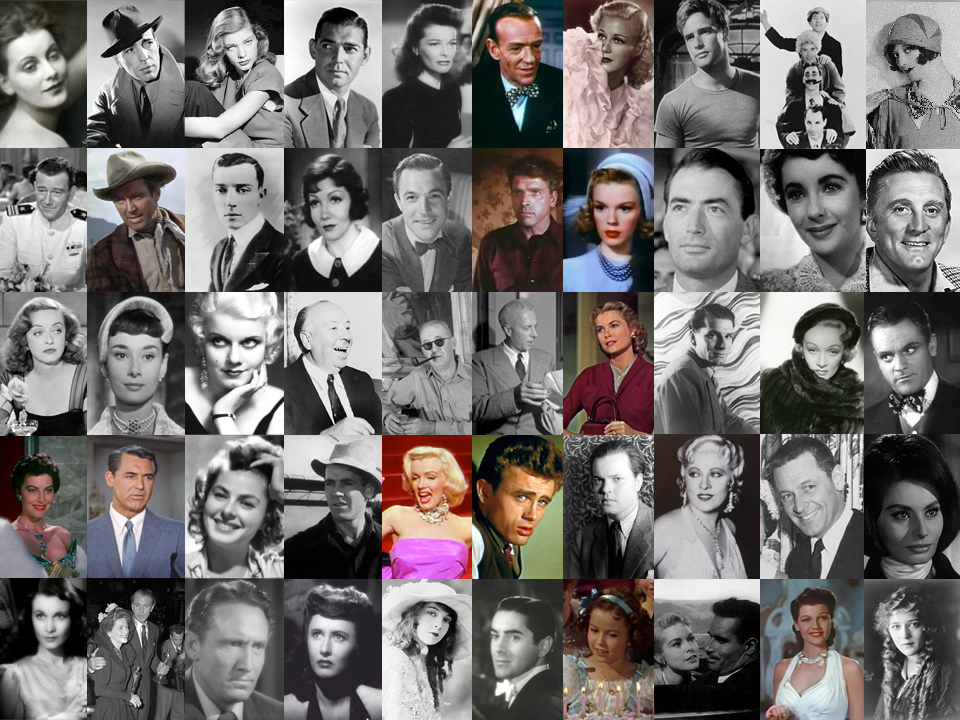
Stars of the Classical Hollywood cinema era (c. 1913–1962). Top row, l-r: Greta Garbo, Humphrey Bogart, Lauren Bacall, Clark Gable, Katharine Hepburn, Fred Astaire, Ginger Rogers, Marlon Brando, the Marx Brothers, Joan Crawford. Second row, l-r: John Wayne, James Stewart, Buster Keaton, Claudette Colbert, Gene Kelly, Burt Lancaster, Judy Garland, Gregory Peck, Elizabeth Taylor, Kirk Douglas. Third row, l-r: Bette Davis, Audrey Hepburn, Jean Harlow, Alfred Hitchcock, John Ford, Howard Hawks, Grace Kelly, Laurence Olivier, Marlene Dietrich, James Cagney. Fourth row, l-r: Ava Gardner, Cary Grant, Ingrid Bergman, Henry Fonda, Marilyn Monroe, James Dean, Orson Welles, Mae West, William Holden, Sophia Loren. Bottom row, l-r: Vivien Leigh, Joan Fontaine and Gary Cooper, Spencer Tracy, Barbara Stanwyck, Lillian Gish, Tyrone Power, Shirley Temple, Janet Leigh with Charlton Heston, Rita Hayworth, Mary Pickford.

Classical Hollywood cinema, or the Golden Age of Hollywood, is defined as a technical and narrative style characteristic of American cinema from 1913 to 1962, during which thousands of movies were issued from the Hollywood studios. The Classical style began to emerge in 1913, was accelerated in 1917 after the U.S. entered World War I and finally solidified when the film The Jazz Singer was released in 1927, ending the silent film era and increasing box-office profits for the film industry by introducing sound to feature films. The golden age of Hollywood is also remembered for its iconic stars, distinctive, studio styles, and films that helped shape the development of American cinema.

Most Hollywood pictures adhered closely to a formula—Western, slapstick comedy, musical, animated cartoon, biographical—and the same creative teams often worked on films made by the same studio. For example, Cedric Gibbons and Herbert Stothart always worked on MGM films, Alfred Newman worked at 20th Century Fox for twenty years, Cecil B. De Mille's films were almost all made at Paramount, and director Henry King's films were mostly made for 20th Century Fox.

At the same time, one could usually guess which studio made which film, largely because of the actors who appeared in it; MGM, for example, claimed it had contracted "more stars than there are in heaven." Each studio had its own style and characteristic touches which made it possible to know this—a trait that rarely exists today.

For example, To Have and Have Not (1944) is notable not only for the first pairing of actors Humphrey Bogart (1899–1957) and Lauren Bacall (1924–2014), but because it was written by two future winners of the Nobel Prize in Literature: Ernest Hemingway (1899–1961), the author of the novel on which the script was nominally based, and William Faulkner (1897–1962), who worked on the screen adaptation.

After The Jazz Singer was released in 1927, Warner Bros. gained huge success and were able to acquire their own string of movie theaters after purchasing Stanley Theaters and First National Productions in 1928. In contrast, Loews Theaters owned MGM since forming in 1924, while the Fox Film Corporation owned the Fox Theatre. RKO (a 1928 merger between Keith-Orpheum Theaters and the Radio Corporation of America) also responded to the Western Electric/ERPI monopoly over sound in films, and developed their own method, known as Photophone, to put sound in films.

Paramount, which acquired Balaban and Katz in 1926, would answer to the success of Warner Bros. and RKO by purchasing a number of theaters in the late 1920s, and would hold a monopoly on theaters in Detroit, Michigan. By the 1930s, almost all of the first-run metropolitan theaters in the United States were owned by the Big Five studios—MGM, Paramount Pictures, RKO, Warner Bros., and 20th Century Fox.

==== Rise and decline of the studio system ====
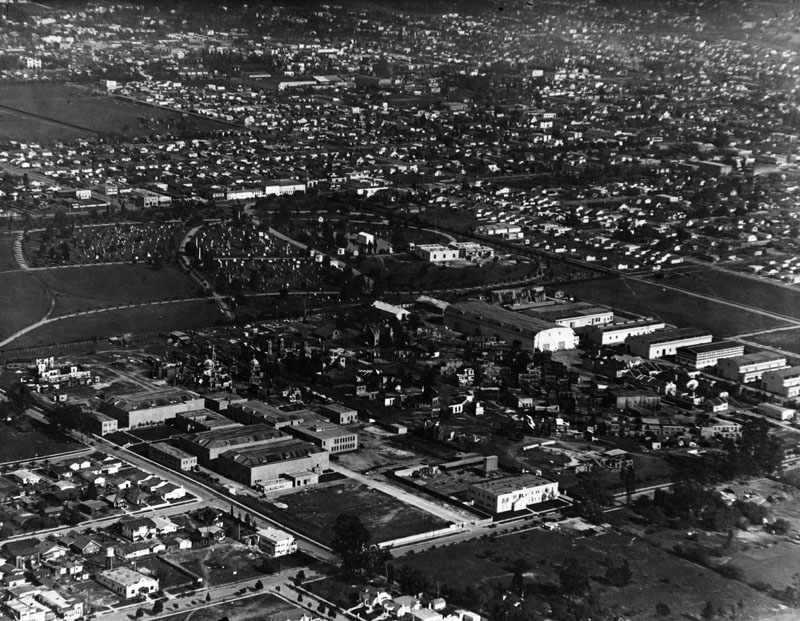
Paramount Pictures studios in 1922

Motion picture companies operated under the studio system. The major studios kept thousands of people on salary—actors, producers, directors, writers, stuntmen, craftspersons, and technicians. They owned or leased Movie ranches in rural Southern California for location shooting of westerns and other large-scale genre films, and the major studios owned hundreds of theaters in cities and towns across the nation in 1920 film theaters that showed their films and that were always in need of fresh material.

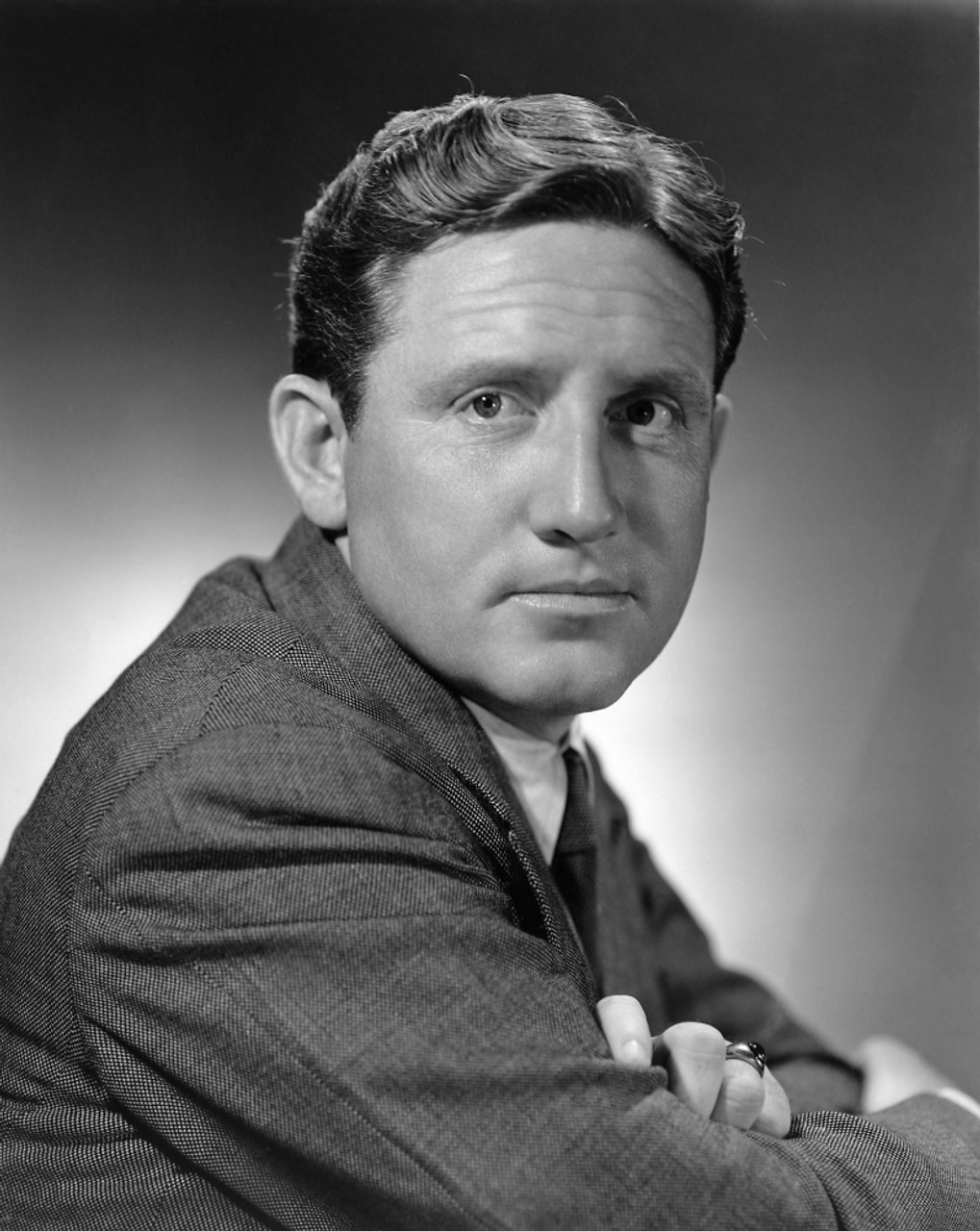
Spencer Tracy, who was the first actor to win Best Actor award over two consecutive years for his roles in Captains Courageous (1937) and Boys Town (1938) (and received seven other nominations)

In 1930, MPPDA President Will Hays created the Hays (Production) Code, which followed censorship guidelines and went into effect after government threats of censorship expanded by 1930. However, the code was never enforced until 1934 after the Catholic watchdog organization The Legion of Decency—appalled by some of the provocative films and lurid advertising of the era later classified Pre-Code Hollywood—threatened a boycott of motion pictures if it did not go into effect. The films that did not obtain a seal of approval from the Production Code Administration had to pay a $25,000 fine (equivalent to $481,823 in 2025) and could not profit in the theaters, as the MPPDA controlled every theater in the country through the Big Five studios.

Throughout the 1930s, as well as most of the golden age, MGM dominated the film screen and had the top stars in Hollywood, and they were also credited for creating the Hollywood star system altogether. Some MGM stars included "King of Hollywood" Clark Gable, Lionel Barrymore, Jean Harlow, Norma Shearer, Greta Garbo, Joan Crawford, Jeanette MacDonald, Gene Raymond, Spencer Tracy, Judy Garland, and Gene Kelly.

Another great achievement of American cinema during this era came through Walt Disney's animation company. In 1937, Disney created the most successful film of its time, Snow White and the Seven Dwarfs. This distinction was promptly topped in 1939 when Selznick International created what is still, when adjusted for inflation, the most successful film of all time in Gone with the Wind.

Many film historians have remarked upon the many great works of cinema that emerged from this period of highly regimented filmmaking. One reason this was possible is that, with so many movies being made, not everyone had to be a big hit. A studio could gamble on a medium-budget feature with a good script and relatively unknown actors: Citizen Kane, directed by Orson Welles (1915–1985) and often regarded as the greatest film of all time, fits this description. In other cases, strong-willed directors like Howard Hawks (1896–1977), Alfred Hitchcock (1899–1980), and Frank Capra (1897–1991) battled the studios to achieve their artistic visions.

The apogee of the studio system may have been the year 1939, which saw the release of such classics as The Wizard of Oz, Gone with the Wind, Stagecoach, Mr. Smith Goes to Washington, Wuthering Heights, Only Angels Have Wings, Ninotchka and Midnight. Among the other films from the Golden Age period that are now considered to be classics: Casablanca, It's a Wonderful Life, It Happened One Night, the original King Kong, Mutiny on the Bounty, Top Hat, City Lights, Red River, The Lady from Shanghai, Rear Window, On the Waterfront, Rebel Without a Cause, Some Like It Hot, and The Manchurian Candidate.

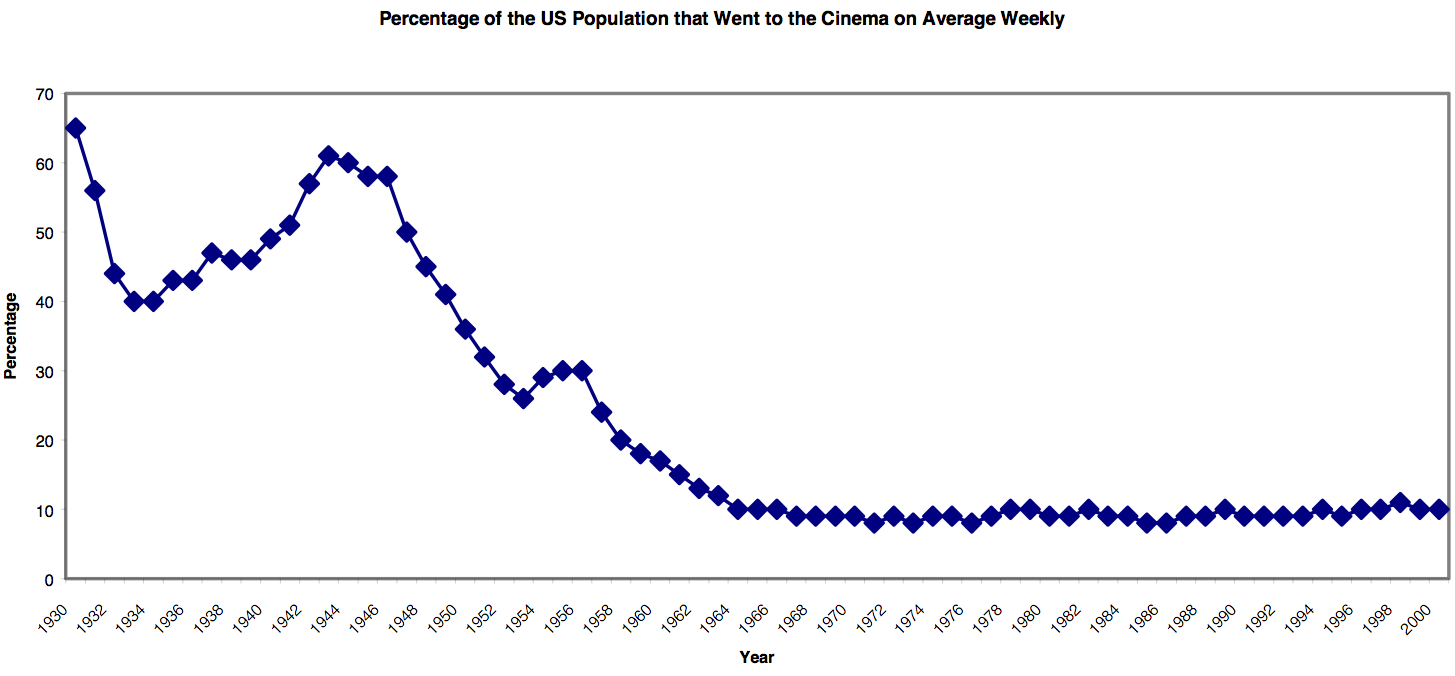
Percentage of the U.S. population that went to the cinema on average, weekly between 1930 and 2000

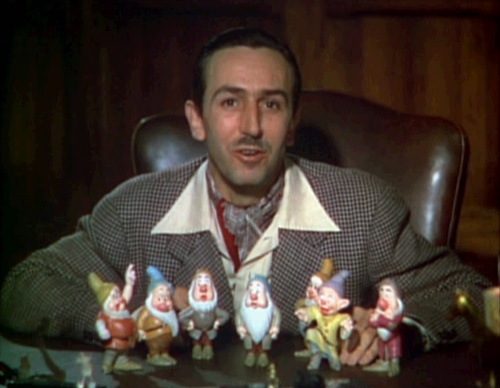
Walt Disney introduces each of the Seven Dwarfs in a scene from the original 1937 Snow White and the Seven Dwarfs movie trailer

The studio system and the Golden Age of Hollywood succumbed to two forces that developed in the late 1940s:

- a federal antitrust action that separated the production of films from their exhibition; and
- the advent of television.

In 1938, Walt Disney's Snow White and the Seven Dwarfs was released during a run of lackluster films from the major studios, and quickly became the highest-grossing film released to that point. Embarrassingly for the studios, it was an independently produced animated film that did not feature any studio-employed stars. This stoked already widespread frustration at the practice of block-booking, in which studios would only sell an entire year's schedule of films at a time to theaters and use the lock-in to cover for releases of mediocre quality.

Assistant Attorney General Thurman Arnold—a noted "trust buster" of the Roosevelt administration—took this opportunity to initiate proceedings against the eight largest Hollywood studios in July 1938 for violations of the Sherman Antitrust Act. The federal suit resulted in five of the eight studios (the "Big Five": Warner Bros., MGM, Fox, RKO and Paramount) reaching a compromise with Arnold in October 1940 and signing a consent decree agreeing to, within three years:

- Eliminate the block-booking of short film subjects, in an arrangement known as "one shot", or "full force" block-booking.
- Eliminate the block-booking of any more than five features in their theaters.
- No longer engage in blind buying (or the buying of films by theater districts without seeing films beforehand) and instead have trade-showing, in which all 31 theater districts in the US would see films every two weeks before showing movies in theaters.
- Set up an administration board in each theater district to enforce these requirements.

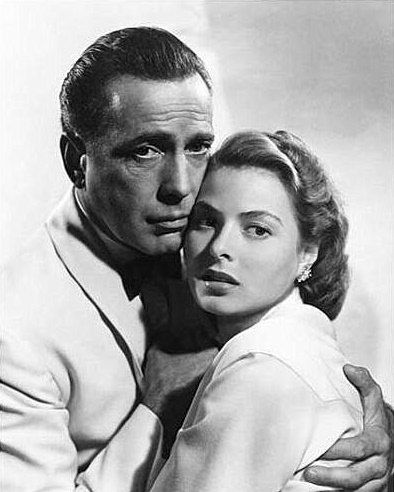
Humphrey Bogart with Ingrid Bergman in Casablanca (1942)

The "Little Three" (Universal Studios, United Artists, and Columbia Pictures), who did not own any theaters, refused to participate in the consent decree. A number of independent film producers were also unhappy with the compromise and formed a union known as the Society of Independent Motion Picture Producers and sued Paramount for the monopoly they still had over the Detroit Theaters—as Paramount was also gaining dominance through actors like Bob Hope, Paulette Goddard, Veronica Lake, Betty Hutton, crooner Bing Crosby, Alan Ladd, and longtime actor for studio Gary Cooper too- by 1942. The Big Five studios did not meet the requirements of the Consent of Decree during WWII, without major consequence, but after the war ended they joined Paramount as defendants in the Hollywood antitrust case, as did the Little Three studios.

The United States Supreme Court eventually ruled in United States v. Paramount Pictures, Inc. that the major studios ownership of theaters and film distribution was a violation of the Sherman Antitrust Act. As a result, the studios began to release actors and technical staff from their contracts with the studios. This changed the paradigm of filmmaking by the major Hollywood studios, as each could have an entirely different cast and creative team.

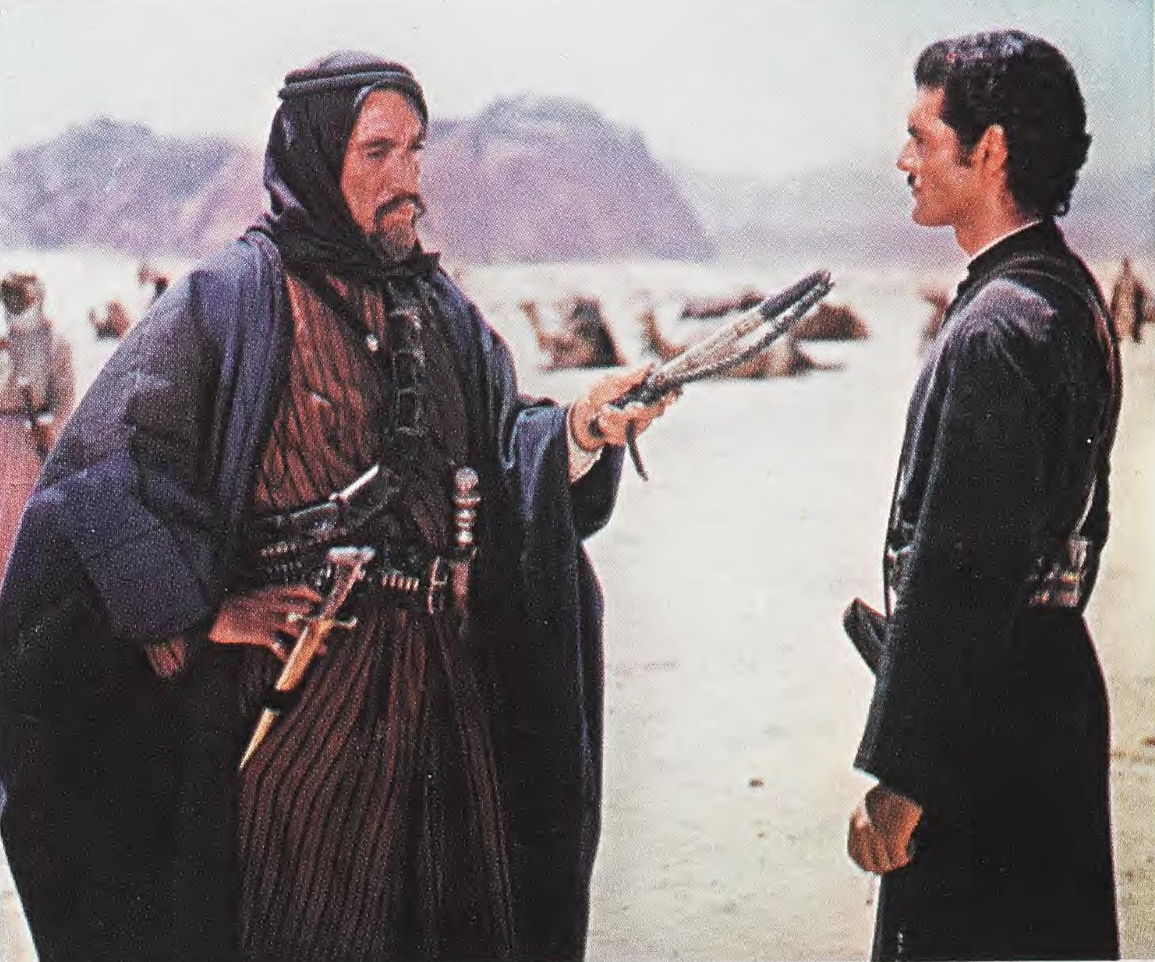
Anthony Quinn (left) and Omar Sharif in Lawrence of Arabia (1962)

The decision resulted in the gradual loss of the characteristics that made Metro-Goldwyn-Mayer, Paramount Pictures, Universal Studios, Columbia Pictures, RKO Pictures, and 20th Century Fox films immediately identifiable. Certain movie people, such as Cecil B. DeMille, either remained contract artists until the end of their careers or used the same creative teams on their films so that a DeMille film still looked like one whether it was made in 1932 or 1956.

=== New Hollywood and post-classical cinema ===
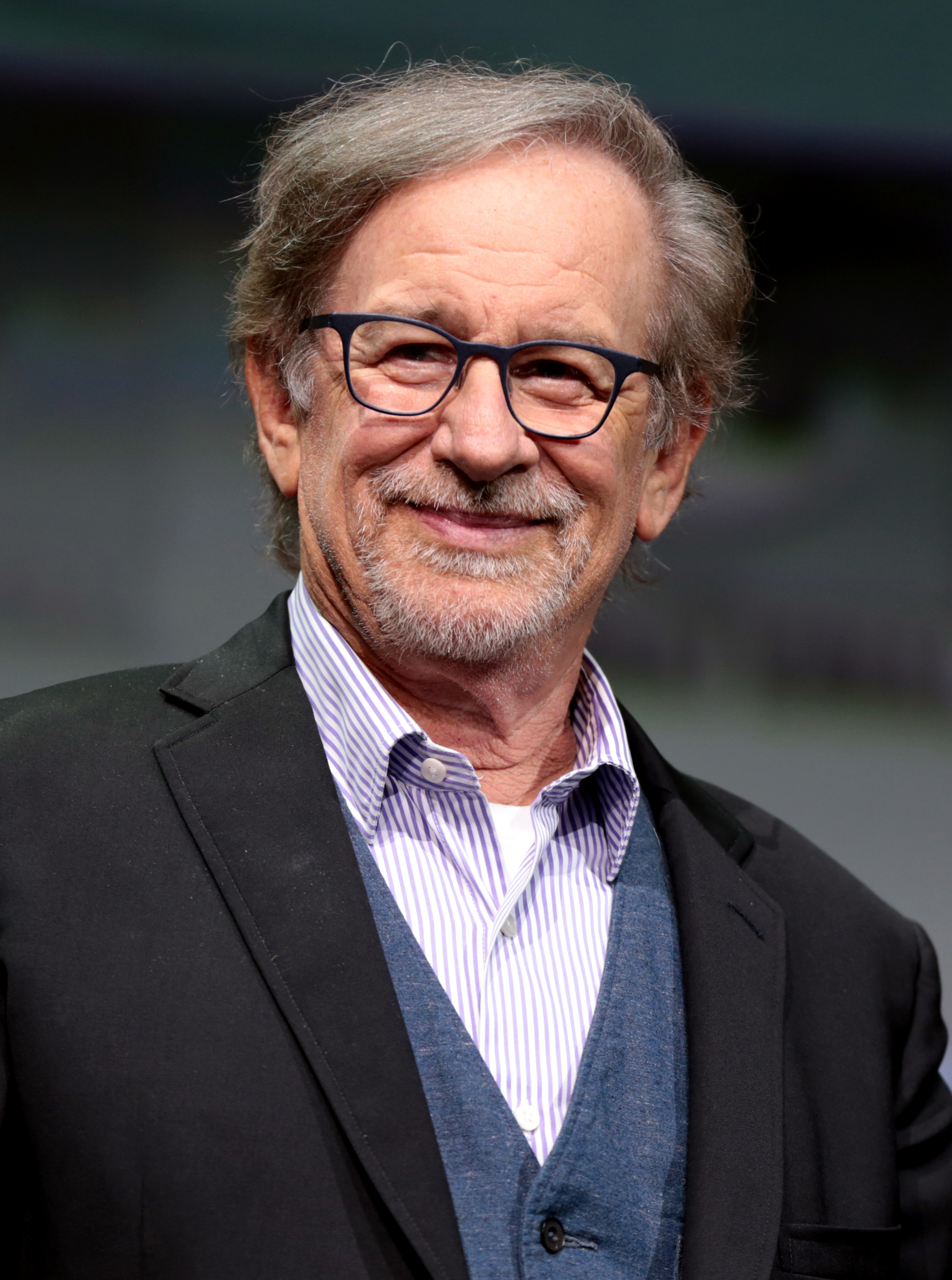
Director and producer Steven Spielberg, co-founder of DreamWorks Studios and Amblin Entertainment, Inc

Post-classical cinema is the changing methods of storytelling in the New Hollywood. It has been argued that new approaches to drama and characterization played upon audience expectations acquired in the classical period: chronology may be scrambled, storylines may feature "twist endings", and lines between the antagonist and protagonist may be blurred. The roots of post-classical storytelling may be seen in film noir, in Rebel Without a Cause (1955), and in Hitchcock's storyline-shattering Psycho.

The New Hollywood is the emergence of a new generation of film school-trained directors who had absorbed the techniques developed in Europe in the 1960s as a result of the French New Wave; the 1967 film Bonnie and Clyde marked the beginning of American cinema rebounding as well, as a new generation of films would afterward gain success at the box offices as well. Filmmakers like Francis Ford Coppola, Steven Spielberg, George Lucas, Brian De Palma, Stanley Kubrick, Martin Scorsese, Roman Polanski, and William Friedkin came to produce fare that paid homage to the history of film and developed upon existing genres and techniques. Inaugurated by the 1969 release of Andy Warhol's Blue Movie, the phenomenon of adult erotic films being publicly discussed by celebrities (like Johnny Carson and Bob Hope), and taken seriously by critics (like Roger Ebert), a development referred to, by Ralph Blumenthal of The New York Times, as "porno chic", and later known as the Golden Age of Porn, began, for the first time, in modern American culture. According to award-winning author Toni Bentley, Radley Metzger's 1976 film The Opening of Misty Beethoven, based on the play Pygmalion by George Bernard Shaw (and its derivative, My Fair Lady), and due to attaining a mainstream level in storyline and sets, is considered the "crown jewel" of this 'Golden Age'.

At the height of his fame in the early 1970s, Charles Bronson was the world's No. 1 box office attraction, commanding $1 million per film. In the 1970s, the films of New Hollywood filmmakers were often both critically acclaimed and commercially successful. While the early New Hollywood films like Bonnie and Clyde and Easy Rider had been relatively low-budget affairs with amoral heroes and increased sexuality and violence, the enormous success enjoyed by Friedkin with The Exorcist, Spielberg with Jaws, Coppola with The Godfather and Apocalypse Now, Scorsese with Taxi Driver, Kubrick with 2001: A Space Odyssey, Polanski with Chinatown, and Lucas with American Graffiti and Star Wars, respectively helped to give rise to the modern "blockbuster", and induced studios to focus ever more heavily on trying to produce enormous hits.

=== Rise of the modern blockbuster and independent films ===
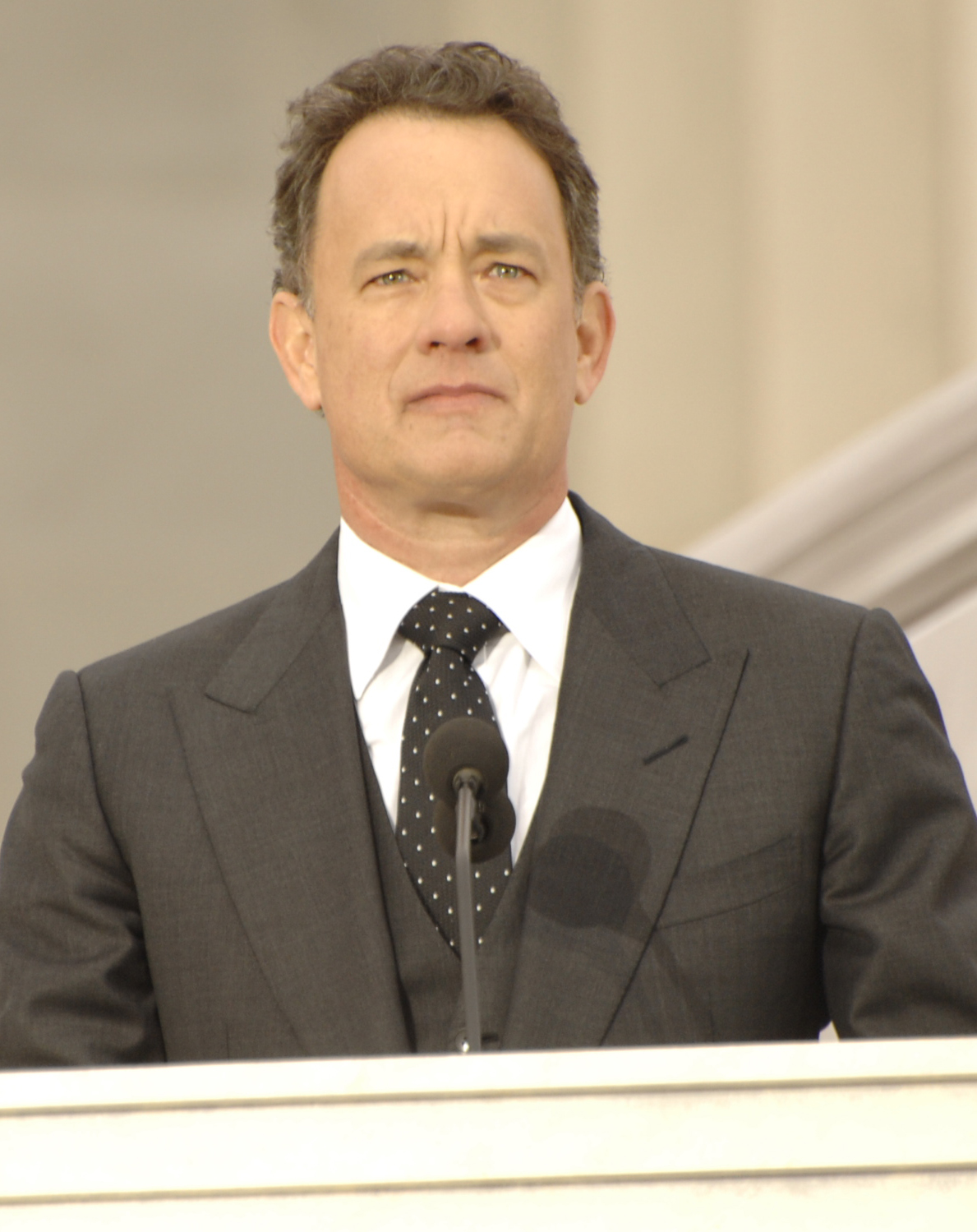
Tom Hanks, who has won two Academy Awards for Best Actor for his performances in Philadelphia and Forrest Gump and has starred in numerous beloved films such as Saving Private Ryan, Cast Away and Toy Story

In the US, the PG-13 rating was introduced in 1984 to accommodate films that straddled the line between PG and R, which was mainly due to the controversies surrounding the violent content of the PG films Indiana Jones and the Temple of Doom and Gremlins (both 1984).

Film makers in the 1990s had access to technological, political and economic innovations that had not been available in previous decades. Critic Matt Zoller Seitz argued that filmmaker Robert Zemeckis, moreso than George Lucas in the 1970s, pushed Hollywood out of its analog phase into the digital era, with his 1989 film Back to the Future Part II being an "almost purely formal exercise" that incorporated several innovations such as ILM's VistaGlide camera system to allow for camera movements in shots where multiple characters played by the same actor are needed on screen. Dick Tracy (1990) became the first 35 mm feature film with a digital soundtrack. Batman Returns (1992) was the first film to make use of the Dolby Digital six-channel stereo sound that has since become the industry standard. Computer-generated imagery was greatly facilitated when it became possible to transfer film images into a computer and manipulate them digitally. The possibilities became apparent in director James Cameron's Terminator 2: Judgment Day (1991), in images of the shape-changing character T-1000. Computer graphics or CG advanced to a point where Jurassic Park (1993) was able to use the techniques to create realistic-looking animals. Jackpot (2001) became the first film that was shot entirely in digital. In the film Titanic, Cameron wanted to push the boundary of special effects with his film, and enlisted Digital Domain and Pacific Data Images to continue the developments in digital technology which the director pioneered while working on The Abyss and Terminator 2: Judgment Day. Many previous films about the RMS Titanic shot water in slow motion, which did not look wholly convincing. Cameron encouraged his crew to shoot their 45-foot-long (14 m) miniature of the ship as if "we're making a commercial for the White Star Line".

American Theatrical Market (1995–2024) All values in billions
Year	Tickets	Box office
1995	1.22	$5.31
1996	1.31	$5.79
1997	1.39	$6.36
1998	1.44	$6.77
1999	1.44	$7.34
2000	1.40	$7.54
2001	1.48	$8.36
2002	1.58	$9.16
2003	1.52	$9.20
2004	1.50	$9.29
2005	1.37	$8.80
2006	1.40	$9.16
2007	1.42	$9.77
2008	1.36	$9.75
2009	1.42	$10.64
2010	1.33	$10.48
2011	1.28	$10.17
2012	1.40	$11.16
2013	1.34	$10.89
2014	1.26	$10.27
2015	1.32	$11.16
2016	1.30	$11.26
2017	1.25	$10.99
2018	1.31	$11.94
2019	1.22	$11.21
2020	0.22	$2.02
2021	0.44	$4.51
2022	0.71	$7.44
2023	0.83	$8.93
2024	0.79	$8.50
As compiled by The Numbers

Even The Blair Witch Project (1999), a low-budget indie horror film by Eduardo Sanchez and Daniel Myrick, was a huge financial success. Filmed on a budget of just $35,000, without any big stars or special effects, the film grossed $248 million with the use of modern marketing techniques and online promotion. Though not on the scale of George Lucas's $1 billion prequel to the Star Wars Trilogy, The Blair Witch Project earned the distinction of being the most profitable film of all time, in terms of percentage gross.

The success of Blair Witch as an indie project remains among the few exceptions, however, and control of The Big Five studios over film making continued to increase through the 1990s. The Big Six companies all enjoyed a period of expansion in the 1990s. They each developed different ways to adjust to rising costs in the film industry, especially the rising salaries of movie stars, driven by powerful agents. The biggest stars like Sylvester Stallone, Russell Crowe, Tom Cruise, Nicole Kidman, Sandra Bullock, Arnold Schwarzenegger, Mel Gibson, Kevin Bacon, and Julia Roberts received between $15–$20 million per film and in some cases were even given a share of the film's profits.

Screenwriters on the other hand were generally paid less than the top actors or directors, usually under $1 million per film. However, the single largest factor driving rising costs was special effects. By 1999 the average cost of a blockbuster film was $60 million before marketing and promotion, which cost another $80 million.

=== Contemporary cinema ===
Since the beginning of 21st century, the theatrical marketplace has slowly been dominated by the superhero genre. As of 2022, they are the best-paying productions for actors, because paychecks in other genres have shrunk for even top actors. In 2023 and 2024, however, Hollywood experts pointed to 'superhero fatigue' as an emerging trend. Actors such as Paul Dano and directors like Matthew Vaughn have made similar arguments.

In 2021, despite the COVID-19 pandemic in the United States, blockbuster films such as Black Widow, F9, Death on the Nile and West Side Story were released in theaters after being postponed from their initial 2020 release dates.

Various studios responded to the crisis with controversial decisions to forgo the theatrical window and give their films day-and-date releases. NBCUniversal released Trolls World Tour directly to video-on-demand rental on April 10, while simultaneously receiving limited domestic theatrical screenings via drive-in cinemas; CEO Jeff Shell claims that the film had reached nearly $100 million in revenue within the first three weeks. The decision was opposed by AMC Theatres, which then announced that its screenings of Universal Pictures films would cease immediately, though the two companies eventually agreed to a 2-week theatrical window. By December 2020, Warner Bros. Pictures announced their decision to simultaneously release its slate of 2021 films in both theaters and its streaming site HBO Max for a period of one month to maximize viewership. However, by 2023, industry strikes by the Writers Guild of America (WGA) and Screen Actors Guild (SAG-AFTRA) highlighted growing disputes over streaming residuals, AI technology in writing and acting, and fair compensation, reflecting the broader challenges faced by Hollywood's evolving economic model. The move was vehemently criticized by various industry figures, many of who were reportedly uninformed of the decision before the announcement and felt deceived by the studio.

2019 onwards has seen the rise of American streaming platforms, such as Netflix, Disney+, Paramount+, and Apple TV+, which came to rival traditional cinema. Industry commentators have noted the increasing treatment of films as "content" by corporations that correlate with the increased popularity of streaming platforms. This involves the blurring of boundaries between films, television and other forms of media as more people consume them together in a variety of ways, with individual films defined more by their brand identity and commercial potential rather than their medium, stories and artistry. Critic Matt Zoller Seitz has described the release of Avengers: Endgame in 2019 as "represent[ing] the decisive defeat of 'cinema' by 'content'" due to its grand success as a "piece of entertainment" defined by the Marvel brand that culminates a series of blockbuster films that has traits of serial television.

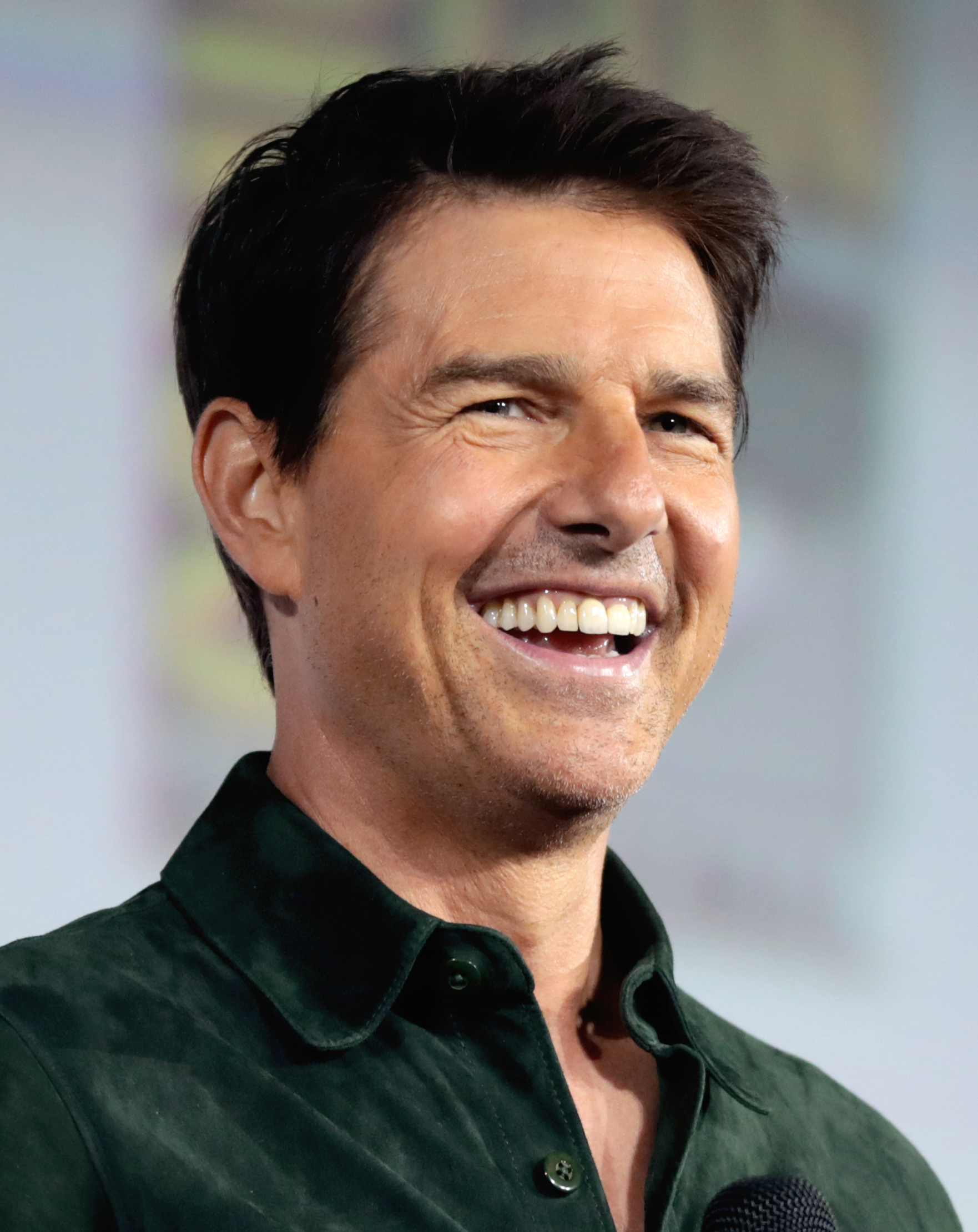
Tom Cruise, in a pre-recorded segment, skydived from the Stade de France to the Hollywood Sign, where he landed and affixed the five Olympic rings, marking the handover of the Games to Los Angeles in 2028 during the Olympics closing ceremony. Cruise himself has been cited as a paragon of modern cinema, with Top Gun: Maverick being cited as one of the first blockbuster films to gain significant monetary success despite being hampered by low expectations and competition from other franchise films and streaming platforms.

The films Space Jam: A New Legacy and Red Notice have been cited as examples of this treatment, with the former being described by many critics as "a lengthy infomercial for HBO Max", featuring scenes and characters recalling various Warner Bros. properties such as Casablanca, The Matrix and Austin Powers, while the latter is a $200 million heist film from Netflix that critics described as "a movie that feels more processed by a machine [...] instead of anything approaching artistic intent or even an honest desire to entertain." Some have expressed that Space Jam demonstrates the industry's increasingly cynical treatment of films as mere intellectual property (IP) to be exploited, an approach which critic Scott Mendelson called "IP for the sake of IP."

The COVID-19 pandemic profoundly impacted the American film industry, leading to widespread theater closures and accelerating the shift toward streaming media. Major studios restructured their distribution models, effectively ending the traditional 90-day exclusive theatrical window. Concurrently, the 2010s and 2020s saw a critical resurgence in mid-budget, auteur-driven cinema spearheaded by independent distribution companies like A24 and Neon (company), which successfully challenged major legacy studios at the Academy Awards with films like ''Moonlight (2016 film)'', ''Parasite (2019 film)'', and ''Everything Everywhere All at Once'' (2022).

Martin Scorsese has warned that cinema as an art form is "being systematically devalued, sidelined, demeaned, and reduced" to "content" and called blockbusters' overemphasis on box-office returns "repulsive", describing Marvel superhero movies as "not cinema". Quentin Tarantino has opined that the current era of cinema is one of the worst in Hollywood history. During a masterclass at the 2023 Sarajevo Film Festival, Charlie Kaufman criticized mainstream blockbusters, stating that "[a]t this point, the only thing that makes money is garbage" and encouraged industry professionals to "make movies outside of the studio system as much as possible". James Gray noted in an interview with Deadline, "When you make movies that only make a ton of money and only one kind of movie, you begin to get a large segment of the population out of the habit of going to the movies", which causes viewership to decrease, though clarified that he has "no problem with a comic book movie". As a solution to the lack of "investment in the broad-based engagement with the product", he suggests that studios "be willing to lose money for a couple of years on art film divisions, and in the end they will be happier."

Analyst and news anchor Fareed Zakaria described the Hollywood film industry in Los Angeles as being in a state of "slow motion collapse" due to the continuous decline in employment opportunities for film workers in the 2020s. The proposed acquisition of Warner Bros. Discovery by Paramount Skydance represents potential further consolidation of major film studios.

There has also been a rise in original horror films, especially in 2026 with films like Obsession which made $23.9 million in its opening weekend despite only having a budget of $1 million. This also happened with other horror films like Backrooms and Resident Evil both making large profits. Many also receive critical acclaim like 2025's Sinners which received 4 Oscar wins and 16 nominations.

== Hollywood and politics ==
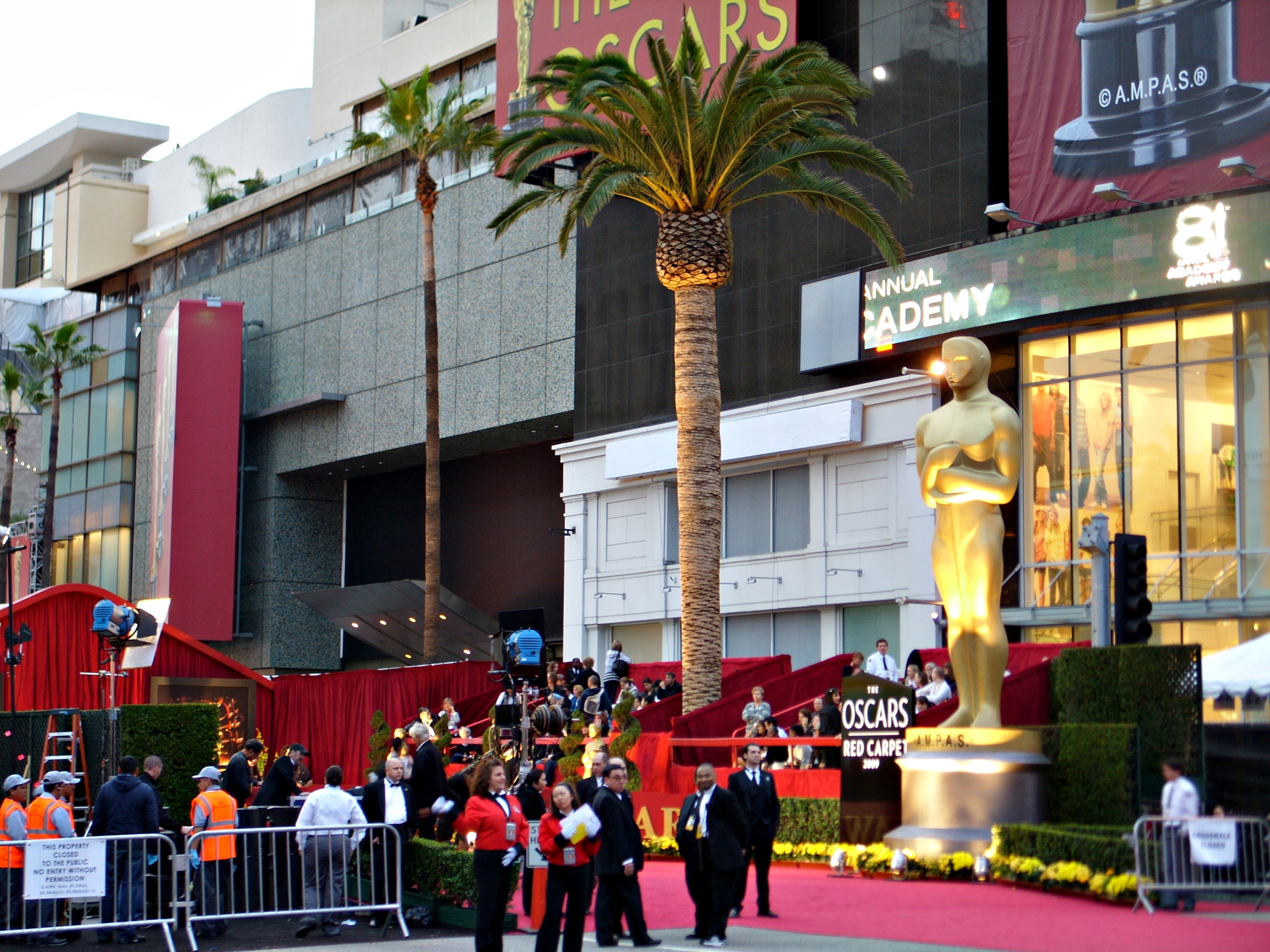
The 81st Academy Awards at the Dolby Theatre in Hollywood in 2009

In the 1930s and 1940s, the Democrats and the Republicans alike saw political opportunities in Hollywood and President Franklin Roosevelt was an early adopter, capitalizing on Hollywood's stars in a national campaign. Melvyn Douglas and his wife Helen toured Washington, D.C., in 1939 and met the key New Dealers.

=== Political endorsements ===
Endorsement letters from leading actors were signed, and radio appearances and printed advertising were made. Movie stars were used to draw a large audience into the political view of the party. By the 1960s, John F. Kennedy was a new, young face for Washington, and his strong friendship with Frank Sinatra exemplified this new era of glamour. The last moguls of Hollywood were gone, and younger, newer executives and producers began pushing more liberal ideas.

Celebrities and money attracted politicians to the high-class, glittering Hollywood lifestyle. As Ron Brownstein wrote in his book The Power and the Glitter, television in the 1970s and 1980s was an enormously important new media in politics and Hollywood helped in that media with actors making speeches on their political beliefs, like Jane Fonda against the Vietnam War. Despite most celebrities and producers being left-leaning and tending to support the Democratic Party, this era produced some Republican actors and producers such as Clint Eastwood and Jerry Bruckheimer. Support groups such as the Friends of Abe were set up to support conservative causes in Hollywood, which is perceived as biased against conservatives. Former actor Ronald Reagan became governor of California and subsequently became the 40th president of the United States. It continued with Arnold Schwarzenegger as California's governor in 2003.

=== Political donations ===
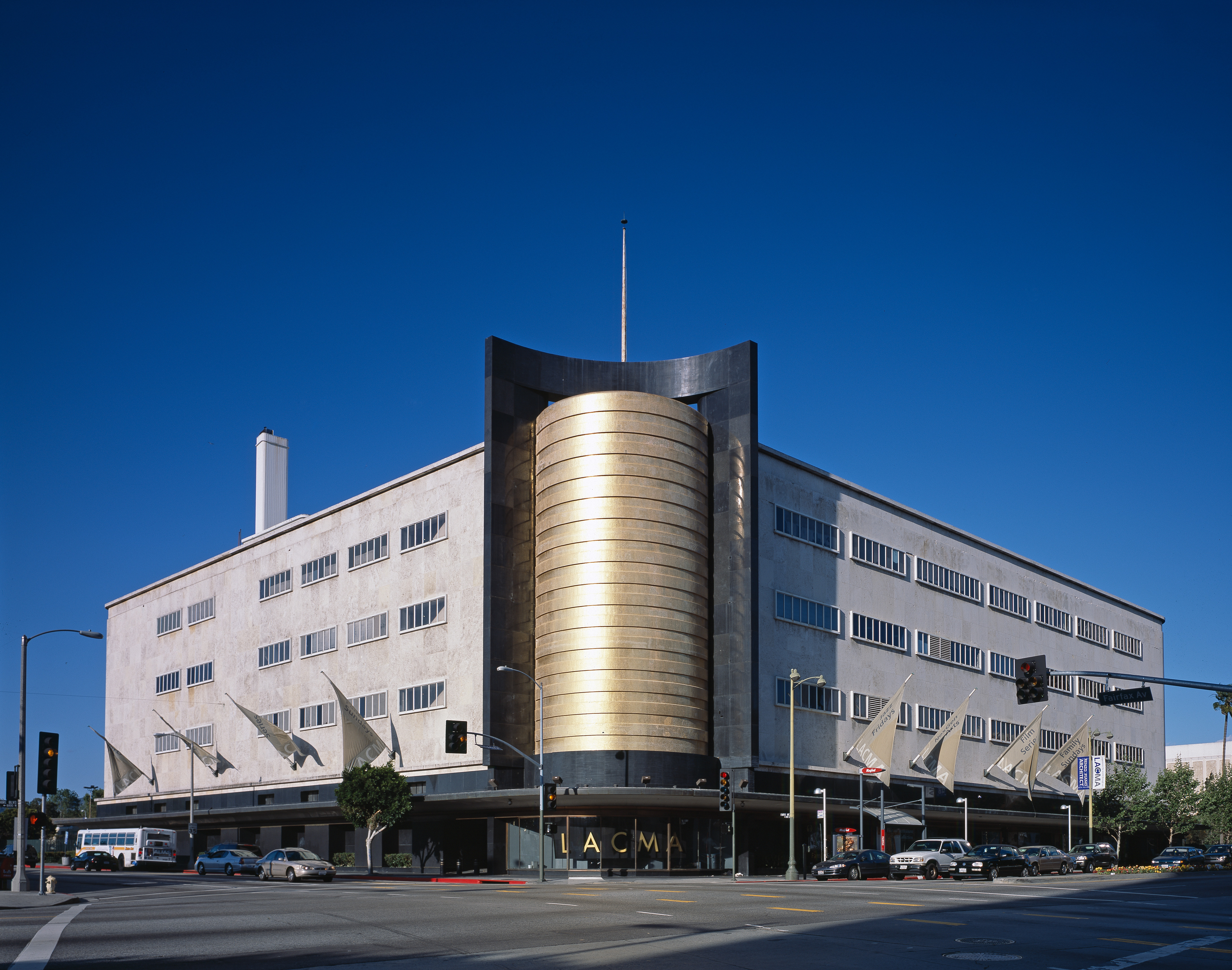
Academy Museum of Motion Pictures

Direct donations from Hollywood help to fund federal politics. For example, on February 20, 2007, Democratic presidential candidate Barack Obama had a $2,300-a-plate Hollywood gala, being hosted by DreamWorks founders David Geffen, Jeffrey Katzenberg, and Steven Spielberg at the Beverly Hilton.

== Criticisms ==
=== Covert advertising ===
Native advertising is information designed to persuade in more subtle ways than classic propaganda. A modern example common in the United States is Copaganda, in which TV shows display unrealistically flattering portrayals of law enforcement, in part to borrow equipment and get their assistance in blocking off streets to more easily film on location. Other reputation laundering accusations have been leveled in the entertainment industry, including burnishing the image of the Mafia.

Product placement also has been a point of criticism, with the tobacco industry promoting smoking on screen. The Centers for Disease Control and Prevention cites that 18% of teen smokers would not start smoking if films with smoking were automatically given an 'R' rating, which would save 1 million lives.

=== Censorship ===
Hollywood producers sometimes seek to comply with the Chinese government's censorship requirements in a bid to access the country's restricted and lucrative cinema market, with the second-largest box office in the world as of 2016. This includes prioritizing sympathetic portrayals of Chinese characters in movies, such as changing the villains in Red Dawn from Chinese to North Koreans. Due to many topics forbidden in China, such as Dalai Lama and Winnie-the-Pooh being involved in the South Park episode "Band in China", South Park was entirely banned in China after the episode's broadcast. The 2018 film Christopher Robin, the new Winnie-the-Pooh movie, was denied a Chinese release.

Although Tibet was previously a cause célèbre in Hollywood, featuring in films including Kundun and Seven Years in Tibet, in the 21st century this is no longer the case. In 2016, Marvel Entertainment attracted criticism for its decision to cast Tilda Swinton as "The Ancient One" in the film adaptation Doctor Strange, using a white woman to play a traditionally Tibetan character. Actor and high-profile Tibet supporter Richard Gere stated that he was no longer welcome to participate in mainstream Hollywood films after criticizing the Chinese government and calling for a boycott of the 2008 Summer Olympics in Beijing.

International distributors often engage in self-censorship to comply with the local laws and regulations. For example, Wolf of Wall Street in UAE was cut by approximately 45 minutes due to explicit erotic scenes in the movie.

==== Historic examples ====
Hollywood also self-censored any negative depictions of Nazis for most of the 1930s to maintain access to German audiences. Around that time economic censorship resulted in the self-censoring of content to please the group wielding their economic influence. The Hays Code was an industry-led effort from 1930 to 1967 to strict self-censorship to appease religious objections to certain content and stave off any government censorship that could have resulted.

== Global Hollywood ==
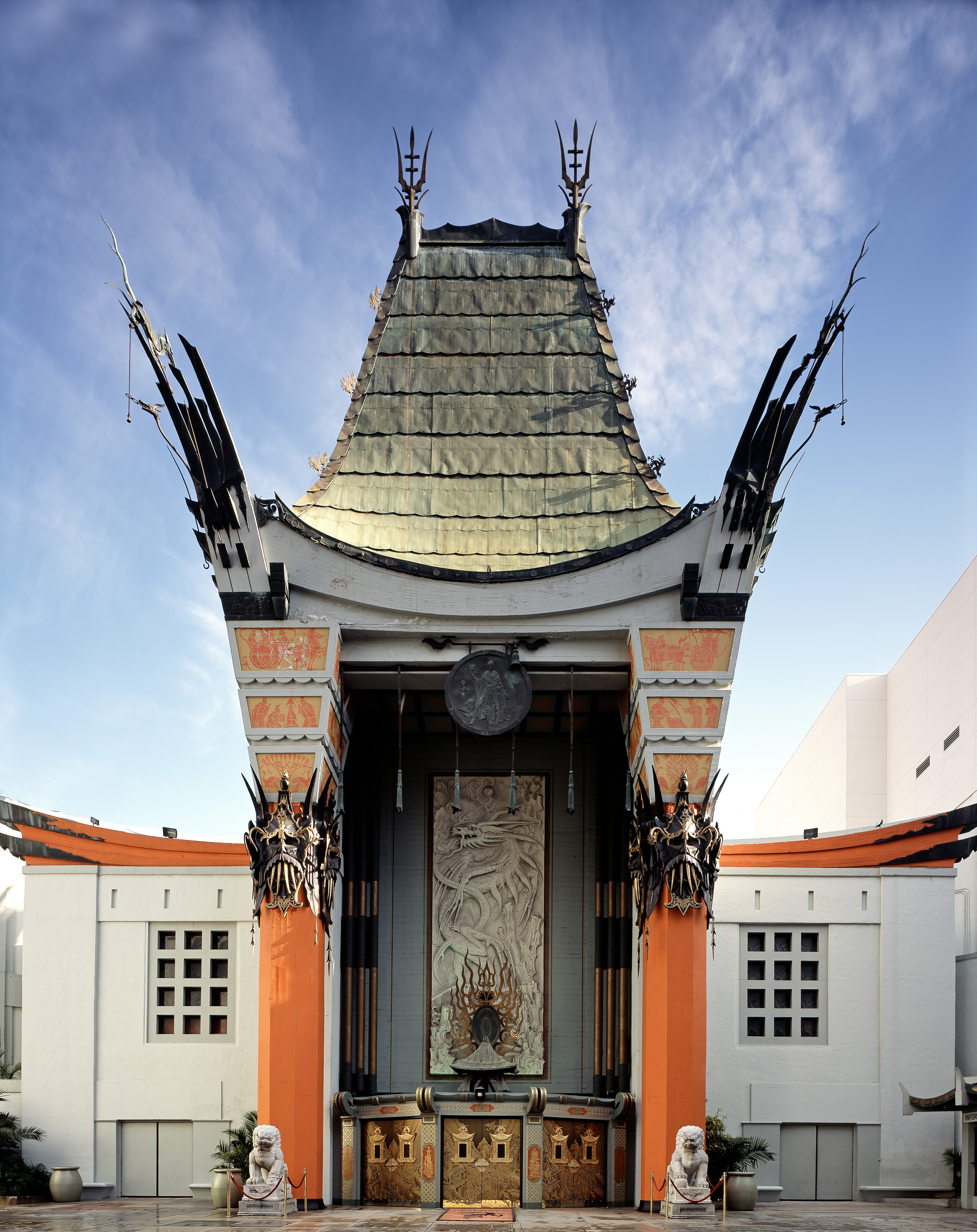
The Chinese Theatre before 2007

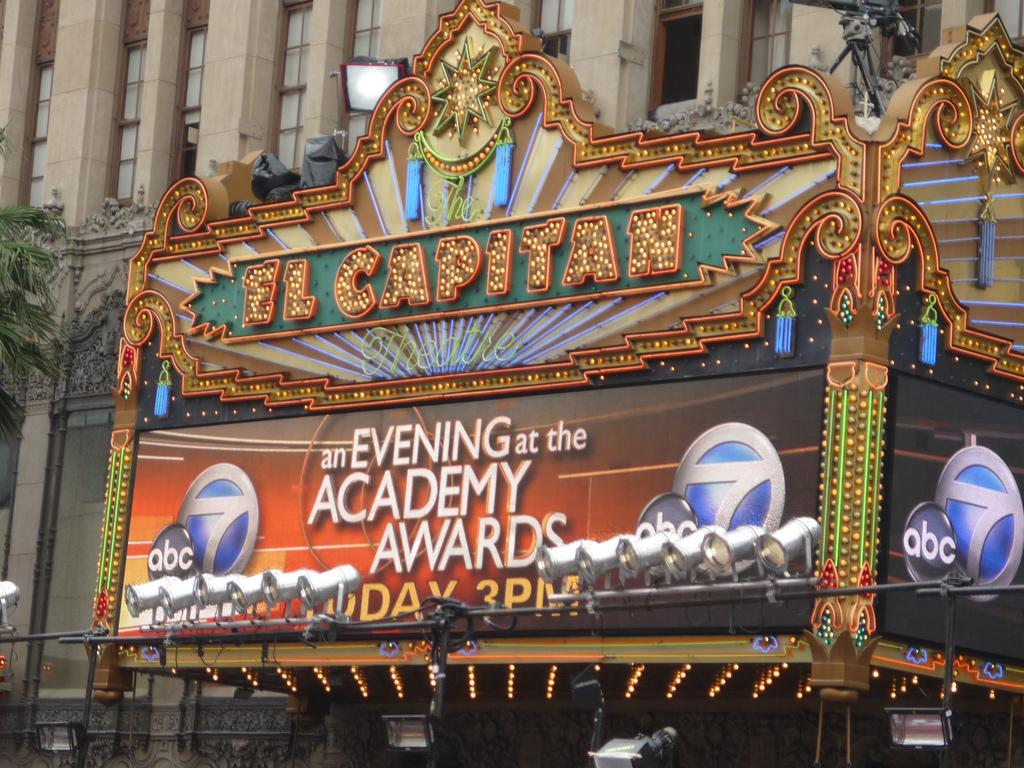
The El Capitan Theatre

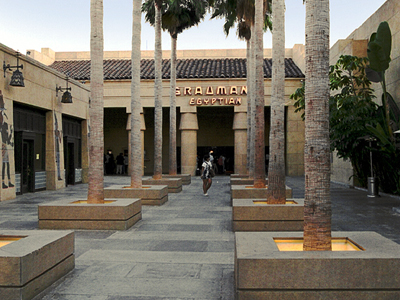
Egyptian Theatre main entry

Political economy of communication researchers have long focused on the international or global presence, power, profitability and popularity of Hollywood films. Books on global Hollywood by Toby Miller and Richard Maxwell, Janet Wasko and Mary Erickson, Kerry Segrave, John Trump Bour and Tanner Mirles examine the international political economy of Hollywood's power.

According to Tanner Mirles, Hollywood relies on four capitalist strategies "to attract and integrate non-US film producers, exhibitors and audiences into its ambit: ownership, cross-border productions with subordinate service providers, content licensing deals with exhibitors, and blockbusters designed to travel the globe."

In 1912, American film companies were largely immersed in the competition for the domestic market. It was difficult to satisfy the huge demand for films created by the nickelodeon boom. Motion Picture Patents Company members such as Edison Studios, also sought to limit competition from French, Italian, and other imported films. Exporting films, then, became lucrative to these companies. Vitagraph Studios was the first American company to open its own distribution offices in Europe, establishing a branch in London in 1906, and a second branch in Paris shortly after.

Other American companies were moving into foreign markets as well, and American distribution abroad continued to expand until the mid-1920s. Originally, a majority of companies sold their films indirectly. However, since they were inexperienced in overseas trading, they simply sold the foreign rights to their films to foreign distribution firms or export agents. Gradually, London became a center for the international circulation of US films.

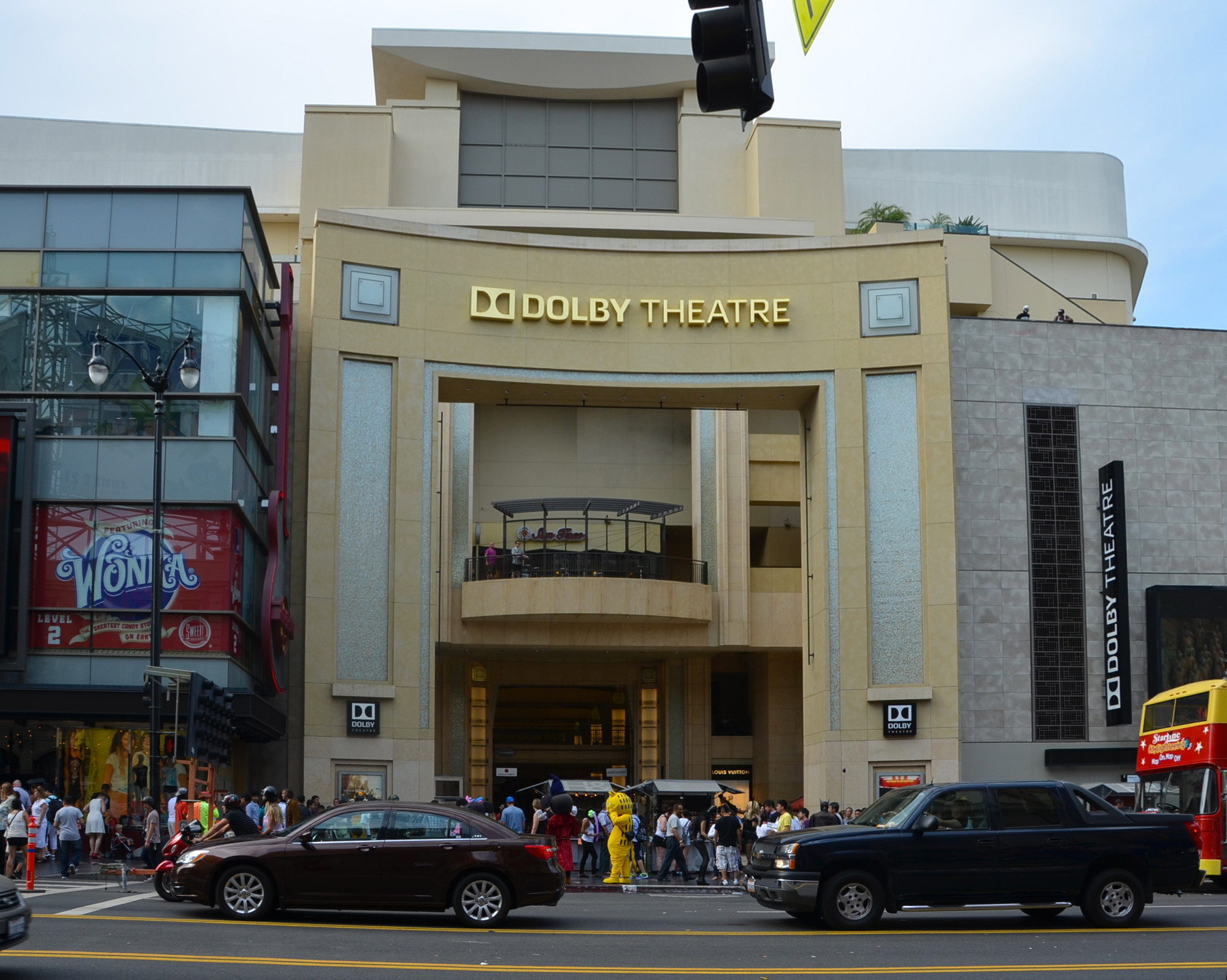
Dolby Theatre, Hollywood's renowned venue for the prestigious Academy Awards ceremony, which honors excellence in film

Many British companies made a profit by acting as the agents for this business, and by doing so, they weakened British production by turning over a large share of the UK market to American films. By 1911, approximately 60 to 70 percent of films imported into Great Britain were American. The United States was also doing well in Germany, Australia, and New Zealand.

More recently, in the last 20th and early 21st century, as globalization intensified and the United States government actively promoted free trade agendas and trade on cultural products, Hollywood became a worldwide cultural source. The success of Hollywood export markets is reflected in the boom of American multinational media corporations across the globe and the ability to make big-budget films that appeal to popular tastes in many different cultures.

Hollywood has moved more deeply into Chinese markets, although influenced by China's censorship. Films made in China are censored, strictly avoiding themes like "ghosts, violence, murder, horror, and demons." Such plot elements risk being cut. Hollywood has had to make "approved" films, corresponding to official Chinese standards, but with aesthetic standards sacrificed to box office profits. Even Chinese audiences found it boring to wait for the release of great American movies dubbed in their native language.

== Role of women ==
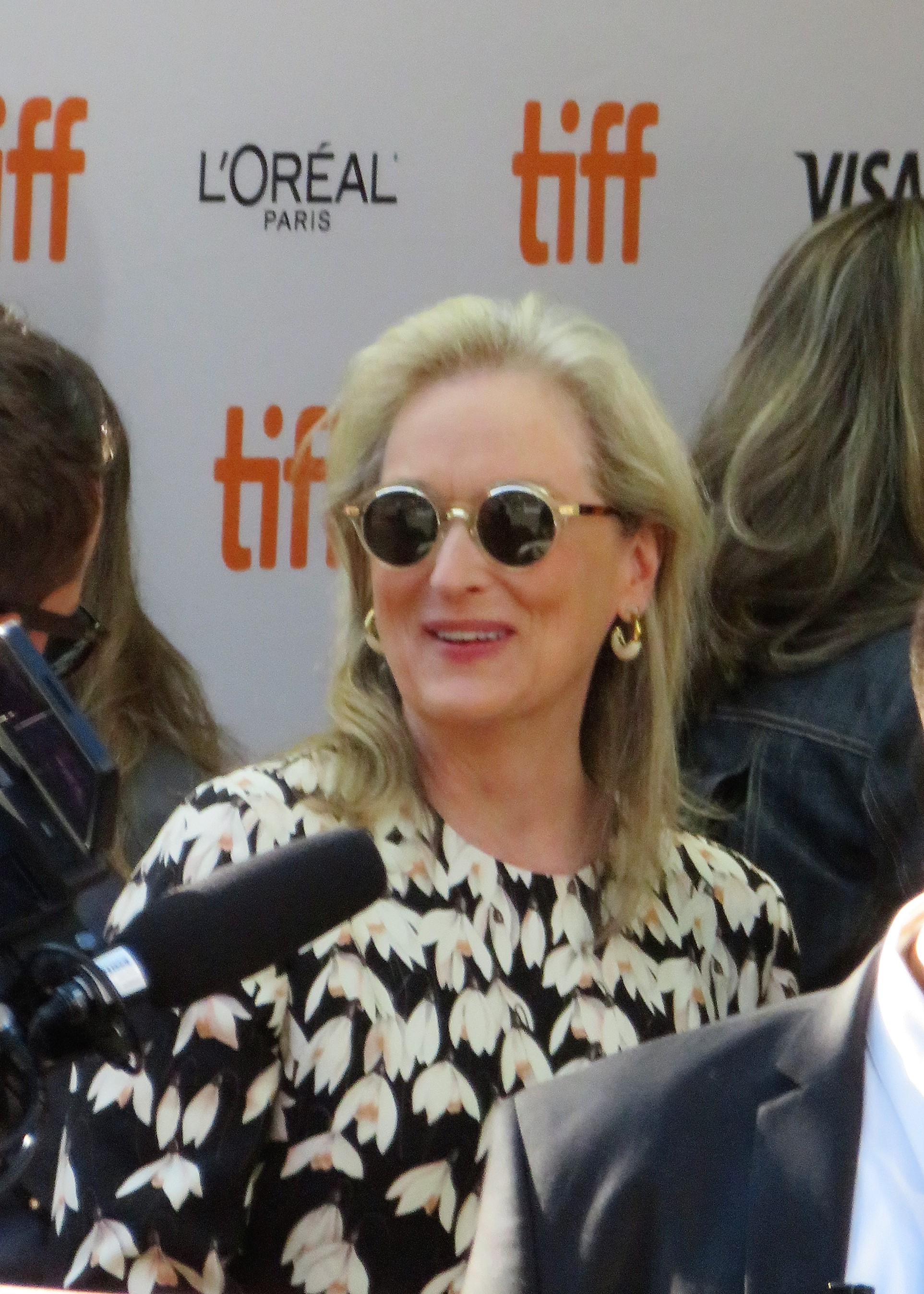
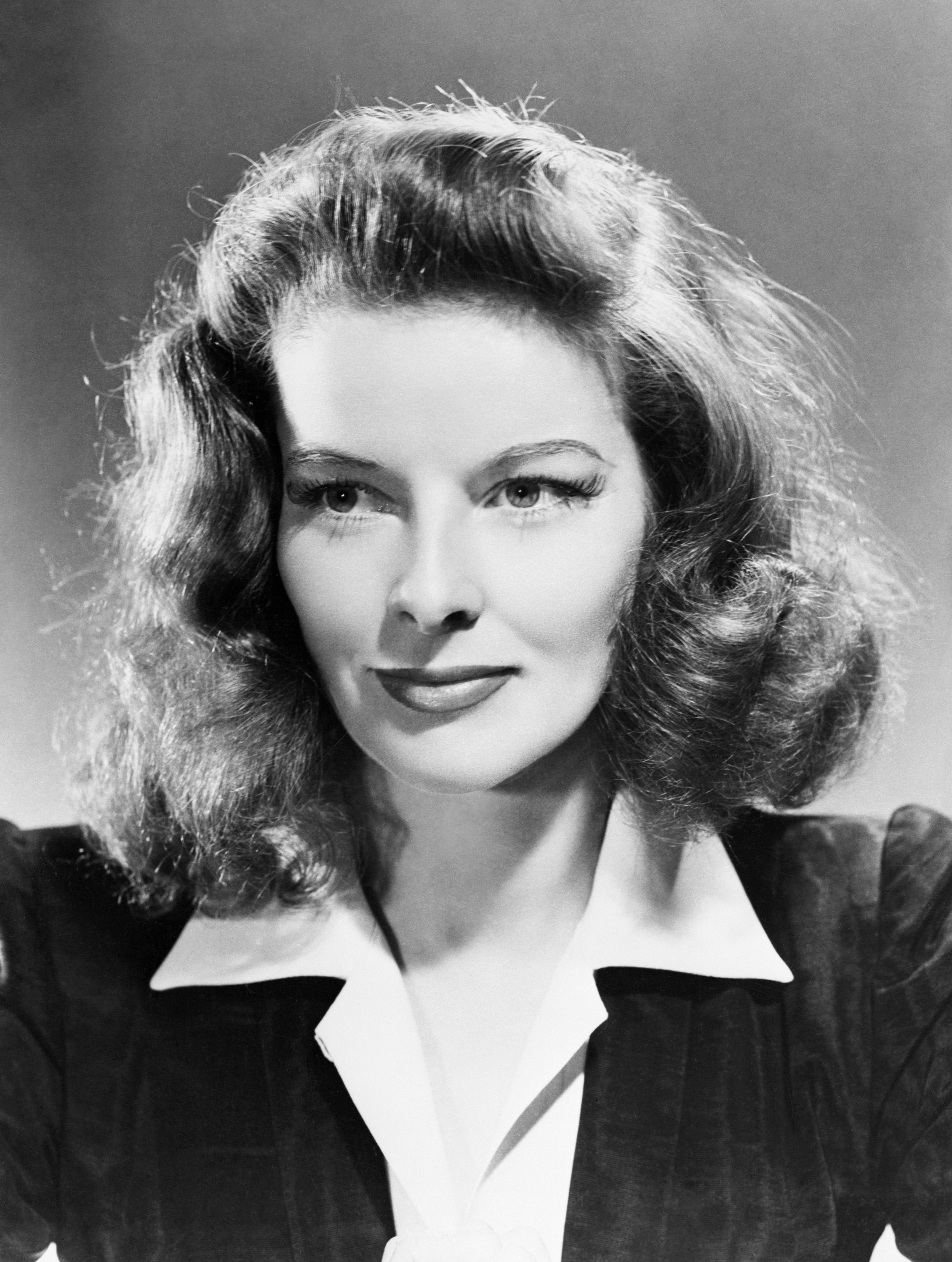
Meryl Streep holds a record for most Academy Award acting nominations and Katharine Hepburn is the only performer to receive four Academy Awards for Best Actress.

Women are statistically underrepresented in creative positions in the center of the US film industry, Hollywood. This underrepresentation has been called the "celluloid ceiling", a variant on the employment discrimination term "glass ceiling". In 2013, the "top-paid actors ... made 2 1/2 times as much money as the top-paid actresses." Older male actors made more than their female counterparts of the same age, with "female movie stars mak[ing] the most money on average per film at age 34, while male stars earn the most at 51."

The 2013 Celluloid Ceiling Report conducted by the Center for the Study of Women in Television and Film at San Diego State University collected a list of statistics gathered from "2,813 individuals employed by the 250 top domestic grossing films of 2012."

Women accounted for:

- "18% of all directors, executive producers, producers, writers, cinematographers, and editors. This reflected no change from 2011 and only a 1% increase from 1998."
- "9% of all directors."
- "15% of writers."
- "25% of all producers."
- "20% of all editors."
- "2% of all cinematographers."
- "38% of films employed 0 or 1 woman in the roles considered, 23% employed 2 women, 28% employed 3 to 5 women, and 10% employed 6 to 9 women."

A New York Times article stated that only 15% of the top films in 2013 had women for a lead acting role. The author of the study noted that "The percentage of female speaking roles has not increased much since the 1940s when they hovered around 25 percent to 28 percent." "Since 1998, women's representation in behind-the-scenes roles other than directing has gone up just 1 percent." Women "directed the same percent of the 250 top-grossing films in 2012 (9 percent) as they did in 1998."

== Race and ethnicity ==
On May 10, 2021, NBC announced that it would not televise the 79th Golden Globe Awards in 2022 in support of a boycott of the Hollywood Foreign Press Association (HFPA) by multiple media companies over inadequate efforts to address lack of diversity within the membership of the association with people of color, but that it would be open to televise the ceremony in 2023 if the HFPA were successful in its efforts to reform. The HFPA would be disbanded two years later as a result of this and other scandals.

American cinema has often reflected and propagated negative stereotypes towards foreign nationals and ethnic minorities. For example, Russians and Russian Americans are usually portrayed as brutal mobsters, ruthless agents and villains. According to Russian American professor Nina L. Khrushcheva, "You can't even turn the TV on and go to the movies without reference to Russians as horrible." Italians and Italian Americans are usually associated with organized crime and the American Mafia. Hispanic and Latino Americans are largely depicted as sexualized figures such as the Latino macho or the Latina vixen, gang members, (illegal) immigrants, or entertainers. However, representation in Hollywood has improved in recent years, gaining traction in the 1990s, and no longer emphasizes oppression, exploitation, or resistance as primary themes. According to Charles Ramírez Berg, third-wave films "do not accentuate Chicano oppression or resistance; ethnicity in these films exists as one fact of several that shape characters' lives and stamps their personalities." Filmmakers like Edward James Olmos and Robert Rodriguez were able to represent the Hispanic and Latino American experience like none had on screen before, and actors like Hilary Swank, Jordana Brewster, Jessica Alba, Camilla Belle, Al Madrigal, Alexis Bledel, Sofía Vergara, Ana de Armas, and Rachel Zegler have become successful. In the last decade, minority filmmakers like Chris Weitz, Alfonso Gomez-Rejon, and Patricia Riggen have been given applied narratives. Films that portray Hispanic and Latino Americans include La Bamba (1987), Selena (1997), The Mask of Zorro (1998), Goal II (2007), Overboard (2018), Father of the Bride (2022), and Josefina López's Real Women Have Curves, originally a play which premiered in 1990 and was later released as a film in 2002.

African-American representation in Hollywood improved drastically towards the end of the 20th century after the fall of the studio system and that trend endures in the 21st century as minority representation continues to increase. However, the long-term increase has not been uniform. A 2026 study of 2,023 top domestic-grossing U.S. films released between 1980 and 2022 found that Black actors' share of screentime was lower when credit conditions tightened and higher when GDP grew; greater Black screentime was also associated with marginally higher domestic gross but lower international revenue share and worldwide gross. In old Hollywood, it was not uncommon for white actors to wear black face.

According to Korean American actor Daniel Dae Kim, Asian and Asian American men "have been portrayed as inscrutable villains and asexualized kind of eunuchs." The Media Action Network for Asian Americans accused the director and studio of Aloha of whitewashing the cast of the film, and the director, Cameron Crowe, apologized about Emma Stone being miscast as a character who is meant to be of one quarter Chinese and one quarter Hawaiian descent. Throughout the 20th century, acting roles in film were relatively few, and many available roles were narrow characters. In the 21st century, young Asian American comedians and filmmakers have found an outlet on YouTube allowing them to gain a strong and loyal fanbase among their fellow Asian Americans. Although more recently the film Crazy Rich Asians has been lauded in the United States for featuring a predominantly Asian cast, it was criticized elsewhere for casting biracial and non-Chinese actors as ethnically Chinese characters. The film Always Be My Maybe was lauded for taking familiar rom-com beats and cleverly layering in smart social commentary.

Before the September 11 attacks, Arabs and Arab Americans were often portrayed as terrorists. The decision to hire Naomi Scott, the daughter of an English father and a Gujarati Ugandan-Indian mother, to play the lead of Jasmine in the film Aladdin also drew criticism as well as accusations of racism, as some commentators expected the role to go to an actress of Arab or Middle Eastern origin. In January 2018, it was reported that white extras were being applied brown make-up during filming to "blend in", which caused an outcry and condemnation among fans and critics, branding the practice as "an insult to the whole industry" while accusing the producers of not recruiting people with Middle Eastern or North African heritage. Disney responded to the controversy by saying, "Diversity of our cast and background performers was a requirement and only in a handful of instances when it was a matter of specialty skills, safety and control (special effects rigs, stunt performers and handling of animals) were crew made up to blend in."

== Working conditions ==
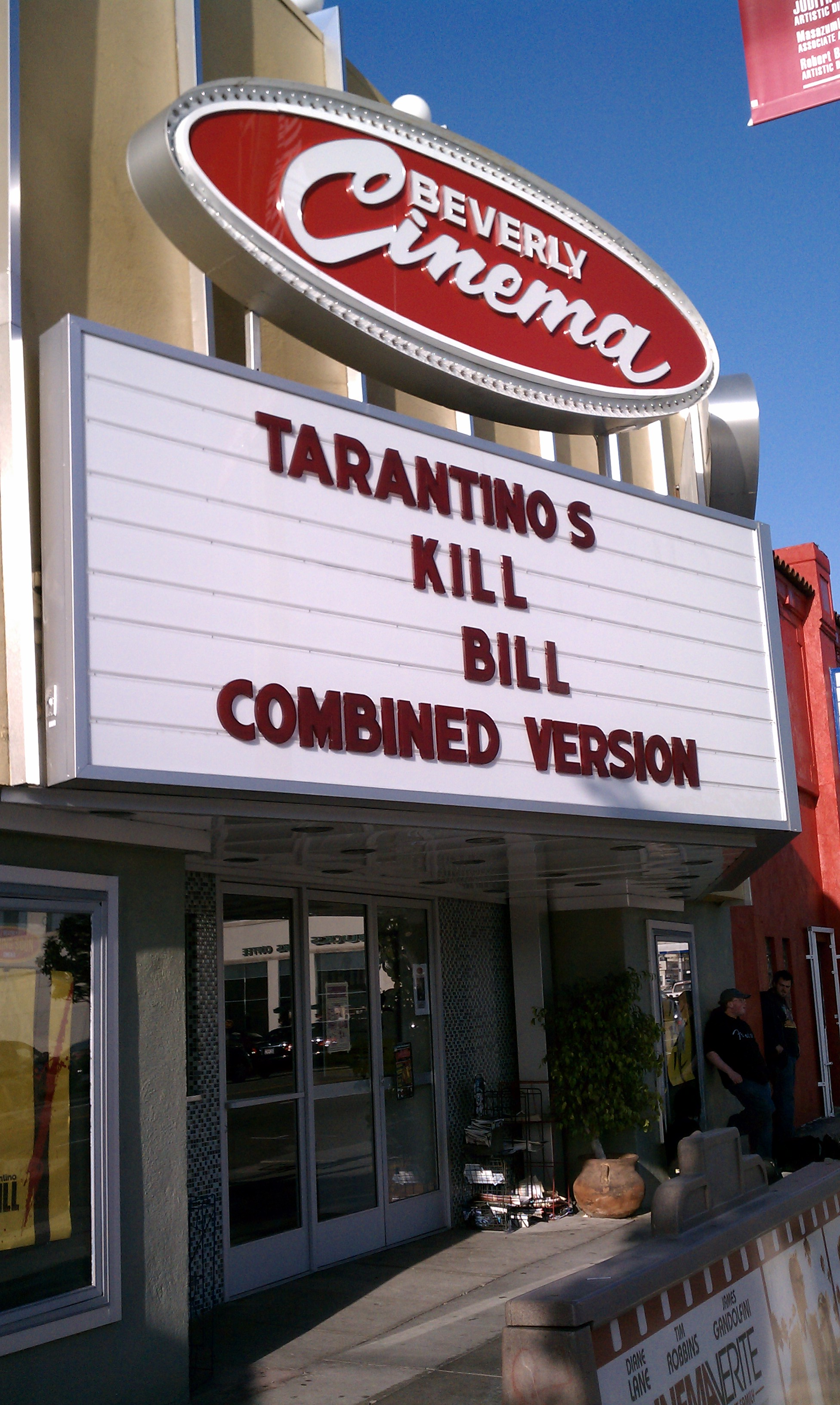
The New Beverly Cinema known for showcasing a diverse range of movies from various genres and eras. The theater retained its vintage charm, featuring 35mm film projections and maintaining an old-school moviegoing experience.

Hollywood's workflow is unique in that much of its workforce does not report to the same factory each day, nor follow the same routine from day to day, but films at distant locations around the world, with a schedule dictated by the scenes being filmed rather than what makes the most sense for productivity. For instance, an urban film shot entirely on location at night would require the bulk of its crews to work a graveyard shift, while a situational comedy series that shoots primarily on stage with only one or two days a week on location would follow a more traditional work schedule. Westerns are often shot in desert locations far from the homes of the crew in areas with limited hotels that necessitate long drives before and after a shooting day, which take advantage of as many hours of sunlight available, ultimately requiring workers to put in 16 or 17 hours a day from the time they leave their home to the time they return.

Amidst a broad decline in the power of organized labor in America in the 20th and early 21st century, all of the major studios have continued to maintain contracts with unions through the Alliance of Motion Picture and Television Producers (AMPTP), a trade alliance representing the film studios and television networks. Due to the casual nature of employment in Hollywood, it is only through sectoral bargaining that individual workers can express their rights to minimum wage guarantees and access to pension and health plans that carry over from production to production and offer the studios access to a trained workforce able to step onto a set on day one with the knowledge and experience to handle the highly technical equipment they are asked to operate.

The majority of the workers in Hollywood are represented by several unions and guilds. The 150,000 member-strong International Alliance of Theatrical Stage Employees (IATSE) represents most of the crafts, such as the grips, electricians, and camera people, as well as editors, sound engineers, and hair & make-up artists. The Screen Actors Guild (SAG) is the next largest group representing some 130,000 actors and performers, the Directors Guild of America (DGA) represents the directors and production managers, the Writers Guild of America (WGA) representing writers, and the International Brotherhood of Teamsters (IBT) represents the drivers.

While the relationship between labor and management has generally been amicable over the years, working together with the state to develop safe protocols to continue working during COVID-19 and lobbying together in favor of tax incentives, contract negotiations have reported to get contentious over changes in the industry and as a response to rising income inequality. In 1945 six-month set-decorator strike, the relationship turned bloody between strikers, scabs, strikebreakers, and studio security.

In recent years, Hollywood has faced challenges such as strikes by writers and actors, which have led to significant production cuts and layoffs across the industry. These strikes have resulted in union contracts that offer more money and protections against artificial intelligence, but they have also caused a slowdown in production and a rise in unemployment among film and TV workers.

== See also ==
- African American cinema
- Category:Documentary films about Hollywood, Los Angeles
- Category:Documentary films about the cinema of the United States
- Category:Films about Hollywood, Los Angeles
- Lists of American films
- American comedy films
- American Film Institute
- Hollywood and the United Kingdom
- History of animation in the United States
- List of films in the public domain in the United States
- Motion Picture Association of America film rating system
- National Film Registry

General

- List of cinema of the world
- Photography in the United States of America
  - Cinema of North America

== Sources ==
- Earley, Steven C. (1978). An Introduction to American Movies. New American Library.
- Fraser, George McDonald (1988). The Hollywood History of the World, from One Million Years B.C. to 'Apocalypse Now'. London: M. Joseph; "First US ed.", New York: Beech Tree Books. Both eds. collate thus: xix, 268 p., amply ill. (b&w photos). ISBN 0-7181-2997-0 (U.K. ed.), 0-688-07520-7 (US ed.).
- Gabler, Neal (1988). An Empire of Their Own: How the Jews Invented Hollywood. Crown. ISBN 0-385-26557-3.
- Scott, A. J. (2000). The Cultural Economy of Cities. London: Sage Publications. ISBN 0-7619-5455-4.
