= American comedy films =

American comedy films are comedy films produced in the United States. The genre is one of the oldest in American cinema; some of the first silent movies were comedies, as slapstick comedy often relies on visual depictions, without requiring sound. With the advent of sound in the late 1920s and 1930s, comedic dialogue rose in prominence in the work of film comedians such as W. C. Fields and the Marx Brothers. By the 1950s, the television industry had become serious competition for the movie industry. The 1960s saw an increasing number of broad, star-packed comedies. In the 1970s, black comedies were popular. Leading figures in the 1970s were Woody Allen and Mel Brooks. One of the major developments of the 1990s was the re-emergence of the romantic comedy film. Another development was the increasing use of "gross-out humour".

== History ==
=== 1895–1930 ===
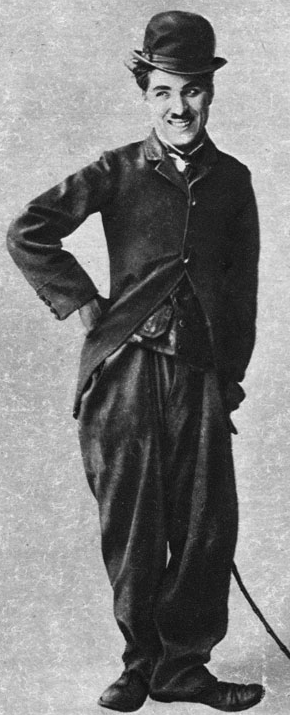
Chaplin as the Tramp in 1915, cinema's "most universal icon"

Comic films began to appear in significant numbers during the era of silent films, roughly 1895 to 1930. The visual humour of many of these silent films relied on slapstick and burlesque. In American film, the most prominent comic actors of the silent era were Charlie Chaplin (although born in England, his success was principally in the U.S.), Buster Keaton and Harold Lloyd.

A popular trend during the 1920s and afterward was comedy in the form of animated cartoons. Several popular characters of the period received the cartoon treatment. Among these were Felix the Cat, Mickey Mouse, Oswald the Lucky Rabbit, and Betty Boop.

=== 1930–1950s ===
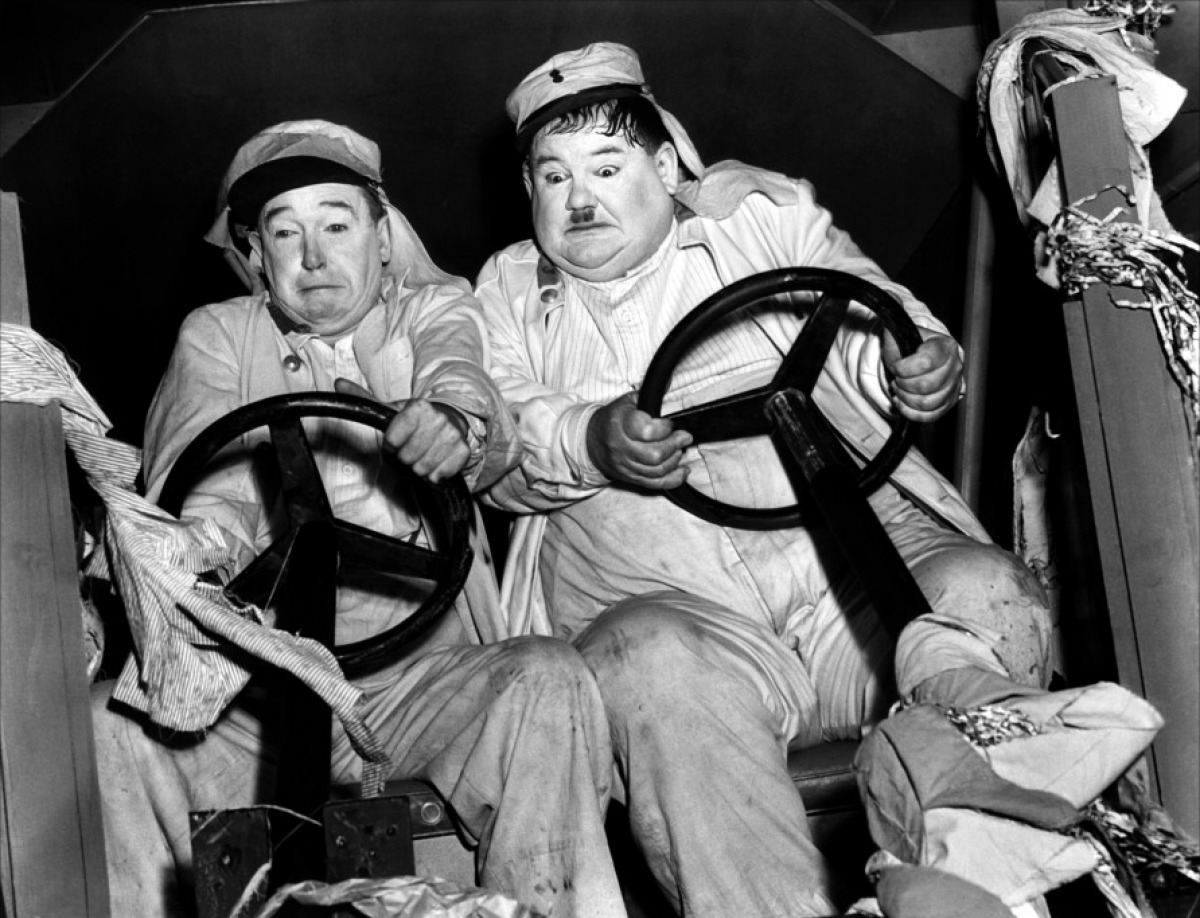
Laurel and Hardy in the 1939 film The Flying Deuces

Toward the end of the 1920s, the introduction of sound into movies made possible dramatic new film styles and the use of verbal humour. During the 1930s, the silent film comedy was replaced by dialogue from film comedians such as W. C. Fields, the Marx Brothers, and Our Gang. Stan Laurel and Oliver Hardy, who had made a number of very popular short silent films, used the arrival of sound to deepen their well-formed screen characterizations and enhance their visual humour, and went on to great success in talking films. The use of sound was used to the advantage for ribaldry for comedians like Mae West. These films were known as Pre-Code. As the Great Depression came to improve, the film industry no longer needed to use shock value to draw in moviegoers. Meanwhile, the Roman Catholic Church recognized the off-color humor in Hollywood and led a moral crusade. By 1934, the Hays Code was enforced years after its original enactment. Film censorship became strong throughout the next three decades. The comedian Charlie Chaplin was one of the last silent film hold-outs, and his films during the 1930s were devoid of dialogue, although they did employ sound effects.

Screwball comedies, such as produced by Frank Capra, and notably "Bringing Up Baby", exhibited a pleasing, idealized climate that portrayed reassuring social values and a certain optimism about everyday life. Movies still included slapstick humour and other physical comedy, but these were now frequently supplemental to the verbal interaction. Another common comic production from the 1930s was the short subject. Hal Roach Studio specialized in this form. While Columbia was prolific, producing 190 Three Stooges releases, alone. These non-feature productions only went into decline in the 1950s when they were migrated to the television.

As the rise of Adolf Hitler and Nazism rose in Germany, Adolf Hitler in popular culture became more common in the American film industry. Bosko's Picture Show became the first American cartoon to parody Hitler, however brief. Der Fuehrer's Face and Herr Meets Hare became cartoons to expand the parody of the Fuhrer. As Jews, the Three Stooges felt personally concerned for antisemitism in the Holocaust. In 1940, they decided to turn their fears into comedy. They parodied Hitler in their shorts, You Nazty Spy and I'll Never Heil Again Chaplin followed with his The Great Dictator. The film was not only Chaplin's first sound film, it was the final appearance of his Tramp character, who he reveals is Jewish.

With the entry of the United States into World War II, Hollywood became focused on themes related to the conflict. Comedies portrayed military themes such as service, civil defense, boot-camp and shore-leave. Abbott and Costello became a popular comedy duo who appeared in films, such as "Buck Privates." The war-time restrictions on travel made this a boom time for Hollywood, and nearly a quarter of the money spent on attending movies.

The post-war period was an age of reflection on the war, and the emergence of a competing medium, the television. In 1948, television began to acquire commercial momentum and by the following year there were nearly a hundred television transmitters in American cities.

By the 1950s, the television industry had become a serious competition for the movie industry. Despite the technological limitations of the TV medium at the time, more and more people chose to stay home to watch the television. The Hollywood studios at first viewed the television as a threat, and later as a commercial market. Several comic forms, such as Burns and Allen, Ed Wynn, Groucho Marx, and Lucille Ball, that had previously been a staple of movie theaters transitioned to the television. Both the short subject and the cartoon now appeared on the television rather than in the theater, and the "B" movie also found its outlet on the television.

As television became filled with family-oriented comedies, the 1950s saw a trend toward more adult social situations. Only the Walt Disney studios continued to steadily release family comedies. The release of comedy films also went into a decline during this decade. In 1947 almost one in five films had been comic in nature, but by 1954 this was down to ten percent.

The 1950s saw the decline of past comedy stars and a certain paucity of new talent in Hollywood. Among the few popular new stars during this period were Judy Holliday and the comedy team phenom of Dean Martin and Jerry Lewis. Lewis followed the legacy of such comedians as Keaton and Harold Lloyd, but his work was not well received by critics in the United States (in contrast to France where he proved highly popular). As in the United Kingdom, in the next decade much of this talent would move into television.

Sex symbols, particularly Marilyn Monroe and Tony Curtis, established the sex comedy by the end of the decade. Set in the 1920s, Some Like It Hot borrowed elements from the Pre-Code era with its subtle undertones and suggestions. Doris Day and Rock Hudson also offered material that set the stage for the sexual revolution of the next decade.

=== 1960s–1980s ===
The next decade saw an increasing number of broad, star-packed comedies including It's a Mad, Mad, Mad, Mad World (1963), Those Magnificent Men in Their Flying Machines (1965) and The Great Race (1965). By the middle of the decade, some of the 1950s generation of American comedians, such as Jerry Lewis, went into decline, while Peter Sellers found success with international audiences in his first American film The Pink Panther. The bumbling Inspector Clouseau was a character Sellers would continue to return to over the next decade.

Toward the end of the 1950s, darker humour and more serious themes had begun to emerge, including satire and social commentary. Dr. Strangelove (1964) was a satirical comedy about Cold War paranoia, while The Apartment (1960), Alfie (1966) and The Graduate (1967) featured sexual themes in a way that would have been impossible only a few years previously.

In the year 1970, the black comedies Catch 22 and M*A*S*H reflected the anti-war sentiment then prevalent, as well as treating the sensitive topic of suicide. M*A*S*H would be toned down and brought to television in the following decade as a long-running series.

Among the leading lights in comedy films of the next decade were Woody Allen and Mel Brooks. Both wrote, directed and appeared in their movies. Brooks' style was generally slapstick and zany in nature, often parodying film styles and genres, including Universal horror films (Young Frankenstein), westerns (Blazing Saddles) and Hitchcock films (High Anxiety). Following his success on Broadway and on film with The Odd Couple playwright and screenwriter Neil Simon would also be prominent in the 1970s, with films like The Sunshine Boys and California Suite. Other notable film comedians who appeared later in the decade were Richard Pryor, Steve Martin and Burt Reynolds.

In 1980, the gag-based comedy Airplane!, a spoof of the previous decade's disaster film series was released and paved the way for more of the same including Top Secret! (1984) and the Naked Gun films. Popular comedy stars in the 1980s included Dudley Moore, Tom Hanks, Eddie Murphy, Robin Williams, and Dan Aykroyd. Many had come to prominence on the American TV series Saturday Night Live, including Bill Murray, Steve Martin and Chevy Chase. Eddie Murphy made a success of comedy-action films including 48 Hrs. (1982) and the Beverly Hills Cop series (1984–1993).

Also popular were the films of John Hughes such as the "National Lampoon's Vacation (film series)" and Ferris Bueller's Day Off. He would later become best known for the Home Alone series of the early 1990s. The latter film helped a revival in comedies aimed at a family audience, along with Honey, I Shrunk the Kids and its sequels.

=== 1990s–2010s ===
One of the major developments of the 1990s was the re-emergence of the romantic comedy film, encouraged by the success of When Harry Met Sally... in 1989. Other examples included Sleepless in Seattle (1993), Clueless (1995) and You've Got Mail (1998). Spoofs remained popular as well, especially with the Scary Movie franchise and Not Another Teen Movie.

There were also "stoner" comedies, which often involve two men on an adventure with random things happening to them along the way. Based on Cheech and Chong, big movies of this subgenre would be Dude, Where's My Car, Big Nothing, Harold & Kumar Go to White Castle, and Pineapple Express. These movies usually have drug-related jokes and crude content.

Another development was the increasing use of "gross-out humour" usually aimed at a younger audience, in films like the "Austin Powers" films, There's Something About Mary, American Pie and its sequels, and Freddy Got Fingered. In mid-2000s, the trend of "gross-out" movies is continuing, with adult-oriented comedies picking up the box office. But serious black comedies (also known as dramatic comedies or dramedies) were performing also well, such as The Weather Man, Broken Flowers and Shopgirl. In late 2006, Borat: Cultural Learnings of America for Make Benefit Glorious Nation of Kazakhstan blended vulgar humour with cultural satire.

Since the late 2000s, the live-action comedy film has entered a period of severe decline, with studios green-lighting far fewer of them each year. The problem is that faced with brutal competition in developed markets in the same timeframe, major film studios became dependent upon distributing their films to increasingly diverse international audiences in emerging markets to maintain their profits; but the humor in most comedy films is tightly bound to the home culture of the films' creators and does not translate well.

== Bibliography ==
- Austerlitz, Saul (2010). Another Fine Mess: A History of American Film Comedy. Cappella Books. Chicago Review Press. ISBN 978-1-55652-951-1.
- Beach, Christopher (2002). Class, Language, and American Film Comedy. Cambridge University Press. ISBN 978-0-521-80749-4.
- Karnick, Kristine Brunovska; Jenkins, Henry, eds. (1994). Classical Hollywood Comedy. AFI Film Readers. Routledge. ISBN 978-0-415-90640-1.
- Krutnik, Frank; Neale, Steve (1990). Popular Film and Television Comedy. Popular Fictions Series. Routledge. ISBN 978-0-415-04692-3.

== See also ==
- List of American comedy films
