= List of films shot in Las Vegas =

This is an incomplete list of films shot in the Las Vegas Valley in the U.S. state of Nevada.

== Films ==
Film title	Year released	Location(s) used	Ref(s)
Heldorado	1946		
Ocean's 11	1960	Riviera Hotel and Casino, Sands Hotel and Casino, Desert Inn, Sahara Hotel and Casino, Flamingo Las Vegas	
The Incredibly Strange Creatures Who Stopped Living and Became Mixed-Up Zombies	1964		
Viva Las Vegas	1964	The Little Church of the West	
Machine Gun McCain	1969		
Elvis: That's the Way It Is	1970		
Diamonds Are Forever	1971	Circus Circus Las Vegas, Fremont Street, The Landmark Hotel and Casino, McCarran International Airport, Tropicana Las Vegas, Riviera Hotel and Casino	
Turn to Love	1973		
The Gambler	1974		
The Godfather Part II	1974		
Harry and Tonto	1974		
Gone with the Pope	1976		
Going in Style	1979		
History of the World, Part I	1981	Caesars Palace	
Things Are Tough All Over	1982		
Megaforce	1982		
Rocky III	1982		
Love Streams	1984	Imperial Palace Hotel and Casino	
Oxford Blues	1984		
Oh, God! You Devil	1984	Caesars Palace	
Starman	1984		
Hell Squad	1985		
Rocky IV	1985		
Desert Bloom	1986		
Heat	1986		
Aria	1987		
Cherry 2000	1987		
Rain Man	1988	Caesars Palace	
Casino Raiders	1989		
Las Vegas Bloodbath	1989		
Another 48 Hrs.	1990		
Harley Davidson and the Marlboro Man	1991		
Honey, I Blew Up the Kid	1992	Hard Rock Hotel and Casino, Fremont Street, various casino-hotel exteriors	
Cool World	1992	Union Plaza Hotel, Fremont Street	
Honeymoon in Vegas	1992	Bally's Las Vegas	
Best of the Best 2	1993		
The Good Son	1993		
Saved by the Bell: Wedding in Las Vegas	1994		
Casino	1995	Riviera Hotel and Casino, The Landmark Hotel and Casino, Atomic Liquors	
Leaving Las Vegas	1995	Bally's Las Vegas, Circus Circus Las Vegas, Flamingo Las Vegas, The Mirage, Excalibur Hotel and Casino, various street locations along the Las Vegas Strip	
Leprechaun 3	1995 filmed on Fremont Street and shows Riveria and circus circus Las Vegas		
Night of the Running Man	1995		
Showgirls	1995	The Forum Shops at Caesars, Riviera Hotel and Casino, Stardust Resort and Casino	
Bogus	1996		
Mars Attacks!	1996	Las Vegas Strip, The Landmark Hotel and Casino	
Swingers	1996	Stardust Resort and Casino, Fremont Hotel and Casino	
Wedding Bell Blues	1996		
Vegas Vacation	1997	The Mirage, MGM Grand Las Vegas, Fremont Street, Riviera Hotel and Casino	
Con Air	1997	Sands Hotel and Casino, Fremont Street	
Fools Rush In	1997		
Austin Powers: International Man of Mystery	1997	Las Vegas Strip, Riviera Hotel and Casino and Imperial Palace Hotel and Casino	
Schizophreniac: The Whore Mangler	1997		
Fear and Loathing in Las Vegas	1998	Stardust Resort and Casino, Riviera Hotel and Casino	
L.A. Without a Map	1998		
Lethal Weapon 4	1998	Minor role: I-215 (then unopened) doubled as a Los Angeles freeway	
Speedway Junky	1999	Las Vegas Strip, desert areas beyond Vegas, other various areas	
Baby Geniuses	1999	Adventuredome (Circus Circus Las Vegas)	
Siegfried & Roy: The Magic Box	1999	Siegfried and Roy Theater at The Mirage	
The Conmen in Vegas	1999	Las Vegas Strip	
Go	1999	Riviera Hotel and Casino, New Frontier Hotel and Casino	
Memento	2000	Minor role	
Pay it Forward	2000	The school scenes were shot in Centennial High School, and other locations in Vegas were used (primarily the northwest section of town)	
Cowboy Up	2001		
3000 Miles To Graceland	2001		
Rush Hour 2	2001	The last appearance of the Desert Inn in film, which was used for shooting most of Rush Hour 2 before it was imploded	
Ocean's Eleven	2001	The Fountains of Bellagio	
Rat Race	2001	The Venetian Las Vegas	
The Mexican	2001	Minor role	
America's Sweethearts	2001		
Gambling, Gods and LSD	2002		
Getting There	2002		
The Brown Bunny	2003		
The Cooler	2003		
Looney Tunes: Back In Action	2003		
Dodgeball: A True Underdog Story	2004	Monte Carlo Resort and Casino, Fremont Street	
Murder-Set-Pieces	2004		
Ocean's Twelve	2004		
Miss Congeniality 2: Armed and Fabulous	2005	Treasure Island Hotel and Casino	
Domino	2005	Stratosphere Las Vegas	
Rocky Balboa	2006	Mandalay Bay Resort and Casino	
Alpha Dog	2007		
Elton John: Me, Myself & I	2007		
Lucky You	2007	Binion's Gambling Hall & Hotel; film shot in 2005	
Ocean's Thirteen	2007	Bellagio, McCarran International Airport, Mandalay Bay	
Knocked Up	2007	Cirque du Soleil	
No Country for Old Men	2007		
Redline	2007		
Three Days to Vegas	2007		
Crazy Girls Undercover	2008		
Dasavathaaram	2008		
Inconceivable	2008		
Iron Man	2008	Caesars Palace	
21	2008	Riviera Hotel and Casino, Red Rock Resort	
What Happens in Vegas	2008	Planet Hollywood Resort & Casino	
Charlie Valentine	2009		
The Casino Job	2009		
Dolan's Cadillac	2009		
The Hangover	2009	Riviera Hotel and Casino, Caesars Palace	
Saint John of Las Vegas	2009		
Anjaana Anjaani	2010		
Get Him to the Greek	2010		
I'm Still Here	2010		
Kites: The Remix	2010		
Somewhere	2010	Planet Hollywood Resort & Casino	
Kites	2010		
This Is Not a Movie	2010		
Hostel: Part III	2011		
Take Me Home	2011		
Ben Banks	2012		
Ek Main Aur Ekk Tu	2012		
The Guilt Trip	2012		
Lay the Favorite	2012	Shot in Rio, Fremont Street and Caesars Palace Parking Lot.	
Nitro Circus: The Movie	2012		
Até que a Sorte nos Separe 2	2013		
The Hangover Part III	2013	Caesars Palace, Fremont Street Experience, Antique Alley	
The Incredible Burt Wonderstone	2013		
Last Vegas	2013	Mainly taking place at Aria Resort and Casino and Binion's Gambling Hall and Hotel.	
Now You See Me	2013	MGM Grand Las Vegas	
Bachelor Night	2014		
Blood Valley: Seed's Revenge	2014		
Step Up: All In	2014		
Think Like a Man Too	2014		
ABCD 2	2015		
Paul Blart: Mall Cop 2	2015	Wynn Las Vegas	
Wild Card	2015		
Jason Bourne	2016	Shot inside Aria and around Sands Expo Convention Center, with a chase scene on the Las Vegas Strip in front of The Bellagio, ending at The Riviera.	
Sarkar	2018	The intro scenes of the film's trailer depicts the city. Most likely that the protagonist resides in Las Vegas in the film.	
Kaaviyyan	2019		
Army of the Dead	2021		
Mirreyes contra Godínez: Las Vegas	2025	Shot at Caesars Palace.	
F1	2025	Shot at the Encore and the Cosmopolitan.	

== See also ==
- List of films set in Las Vegas
- List of television shows set in Las Vegas
- Cinema of the United States
- Cinema of the world
