= Where It's At (film) =

1969 film by Garson Kanin

- Theatrical release poster
- Directed by: Garson Kanin
- Written by: Garson Kanin
- Produced by: Frank Ross
- Starring: David Janssen; Rosemary Forsyth; Robert Drivas; Brenda Vaccaro; Don Rickles
- Cinematography: Burnett Guffey
- Edited by: Stefan Arnsten
- Music by: Benny Golson
- Production companies: Frank Ross Productions; TFT Productions
- Distributed by: United Artists
- Release date: May 7, 1969
- Running time: 106 minutes
- Country: United States
- Language: English

Where It's At is a 1969 American drama film written and directed by Garson Kanin and starring David Janssen, Rosemary Forsyth, Robert Drivas, Brenda Vaccaro and Don Rickles. The film was released on May 7, 1969, by United Artists.

== Plot ==
A.C. Smith owns and operates the Caesars Palace hotel and casino in Las Vegas. During the visit of his adult son Andy, A.C. Smith wishes Andy showed interest in women or the hotel, which he prioritizes.

Andy stays to learn the business after losing a cut of cards to A.C. He soon begins flirtations with Molly Hirsch and Diana Mayhew, who respectively happen to be A.C.'s secretary and mistress. A chip off the old block, Andy saves the hotel for A.C. by winning a game of chance. He ends up with Molly, and his dad ends up with the family business in good hands.

== Cast ==
- David Janssen as A.C. Smith
- Rosemary Forsyth as Diana Mayhew
- Robert Drivas as Andy Smith
- Brenda Vaccaro as Molly Hirsch
- Don Rickles as Willie
- Edy Williams as Phyllis Horrigan
- Anthony Holland as Henry
- Vince Howard as Ralph
- Warrene Ott as Betty Avery
- The Committee as Themselves

== See also ==
- List of American films of 1969
- List of films set in Las Vegas
