= The Lady Gambles =

1949 film by Michael Gordon

- Directed by: Michael Gordon
- Screenplay by: Roy Huggins; Halstead Welles (adaptation)
- Story by: Lewis Meltzer; Oscar Saul
- Produced by: Michael Kraike
- Starring: Barbara Stanwyck; Robert Preston; Stephen McNally
- Cinematography: Russell Metty
- Edited by: Milton Carruth
- Music by: Frank Skinner
- Production company: Universal Pictures
- Distributed by: Universal Pictures
- Release date: May 20, 1949 (New York City)
- Running time: 99 minutes
- Country: United States
- Language: English
- Budget: $930,000

The Lady Gambles is a 1949 American film noir drama film directed by Michael Gordon and starring Barbara Stanwyck, Robert Preston and Stephen McNally.

== Plot ==
When his estranged wife Joan is found badly beaten after using loaded dice in a back-alley game, David Boothe looks back on how she came to this sorry state.

A reporter from Chicago, he is on an assignment at Boulder Dam, so he and his wife stay at a hotel in Las Vegas. There the casino's owner, Corrigan, introduces her to gambling with a few chips on the house. Joan eventually loses $600 of David's expense money, as well as pawning a camera, before winning it back. Gambling excites her. When her sister Ruth joins them in Nevada, her husband decides to leave. Ruth has always been a divisive presence, manipulative and neurotic. Corrigan flirts with Joan and persuades her to be his proxy in a poker game. She wins $4,000 and is given a share. But the game lasts till dawn, and when David phones from the road, Ruth tells him Joan has not slept in her bed all night. He returns to Vegas and can see how gambling has her hooked.

David quits his job and takes her to Mexico, where he intends to write a book. A couple Joan met in Vegas get her into a dice game, where she loses all of their life savings. David leaves, intending to file for a divorce.

Not knowing where else to go, Joan returns to Vegas, where she is hired by Corrigan to front a horse-racing operation. But she double-crosses his partners just to cash in on a long-shot bet. On her own again, Joan descends into a world of disreputable characters, partnering in Shreveport with a crooked gambler named Frenchy.

By the time David reunites with her after her beating, Joan is hospitalized and suicidal. He must fight to convince her that it is not too late to kick her gambling habit and save their marriage.

== Cast ==
- Barbara Stanwyck as Joan Phillips Boothe
- Robert Preston as David Boothe
- Stephen McNally as Horace Corrigan
- Edith Barrett as Ruth Phillips
- John Hoyt as Dr. Rojac
- Elliott Sullivan as Barky
- John Harmon as Frenchy
- Philip Van Zandt as Chuck Benson
- Leif Erickson as Tony
- Curt Conway as Bank Clerk
- Houseley Stevenson as Pawnbroker
- Don Beddoe as Mr. Dennis Sutherland
- Nana Bryant as Mrs. Dennis Sutherland
- Tony Curtis as Bellboy (as Anthony Curtis)
- Peter Leeds as Jack Harrison, Hotel Clerk
- Frank Moran as Murphy
- Esther Howard as Gross Lady
- John Indrisano as Bert

This is Tony Curtis's third film, in a bit part lasting less than 10 seconds on screen. He has four lines.

== Reception ==
The Philadelphia Inquirer was unimpressed: "The long story of her transformation from a happy wife to a fanatic who would shoot her husband’s last dollar is unfolded in all its far from fascinating detail. The role...hardly calls for Miss Stanwyck’s best. She does what she can, which isn't too much considering the ridiculous motivation of the part and the preposterousness of that hysterical condition. Robert Preston has a terrible time as the husband, but Stephen McNally at least manages to put some color into the Casino proprietor who leads Barbara farther and farther astray before leaving her flat..."

== See also ==
- List of films set in Las Vegas
