= Russell Metty =

American cinematographer (1906-1978)

- Promotion image of Metty during the filming of Spartacus (1960).
- Born: Russell Louis Metty; September 20, 1906; Los Angeles, California, U.S.
- Died: April 28, 1978 (aged 71); Los Angeles, California, U.S.
- Occupation: Cinematographer
- Awards: See below

Russell Louis Metty, ASC (September 20, 1906 – April 28, 1978) was an American cinematographer. Described by Charlton Heston as “unquestionably one of the great cameramen,” he worked on over 170 film and television productions between 1934 and 1977, and was noted for his versatility across many different genres and styles.

Metty was best known for his collaborations with directors Douglas Sirk, with whom he worked on in 11 films, and Orson Welles. He won the Academy Award for Best Cinematography (Color) for his work on Stanley Kubrick’s 1960 film Spartacus, with a second nomination for the musical Flower Drum Song (1961).

== Early life ==
Metty was born and raised in Los Angeles, California, to George Andrew Metty and Ida Blanche Campbell. His career began around 1925 as an assistant with Standard Film Laboratory, then was hired by Paramount Pictures to work in the camera department. He left for RKO in 1929.

== Career ==
His first film as cinematographer was the 1934 Richard Dix Western West of the Pecos.

Metty became a regular cameraman at Universal. He became known for his versatility across different genres and styles, both in black-and-white and color photography. He was a collaborator of Orson Welles during the 1940s. He was the pre-production test photographer for Citizen Kane, shot additional scenes for The Magnificent Ambersons, and was the main director of photography for The Stranger and Touch of Evil.

Beginning with 1952’s Against All Flags, Metty began a long collaboration with director Douglas Sirk. He shot a total of 11 films for Sirk, becoming known for his lush Technicolor palettes.

He won an Academy Award for Best Cinematography (Color) for his work on Stanley Kubrick's Spartacus (1960), although his duties on that project had been largely superseded by its director during production. He received a second Oscar nomination for the musical Flower Drum Song (1961).

He also worked with notable directors like Dorothy Arzner, Edward Dmytryk, William A. Wellman, Raoul Walsh, Norman Jewison, King Vidor, John Huston (The Misfits, 1961), Franklin J. Schaffner (The War Lord, 1965), and George Roy Hill (Thoroughly Modern Millie, 1967).

Later in his career, Metty worked mainly on television, earning Primetime Emmy nominations for The Waltons and Tribes. He shot the first five episodes of Columbo and the miniseries Rich Man, Poor Man. One of his last film credits was shooting test footage for Martin Scorsese's Alice Doesn't Live Here Anymore (1974).

== Personal life ==
Metty was married to actress Edith Haskins, with whom he had two children. After their divorce, he married Glenna Lee (née Rice), and they had a daughter, Andrea (b. 1969).

=== Death ===
A longtime resident of the Canoga Park neighborhood of Los Angeles, Metty died there in 1978, five years after his second wife.

== Filmography ==
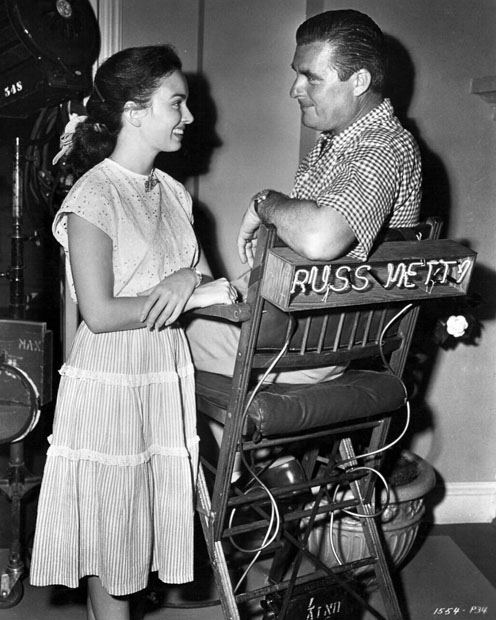
With Ann Blyth (left) on the set of A Woman's Vengeance (1948)

- West of the Pecos (1934)
- Night Waitress (1936)
- They Wanted to Marry (1937)
- Behind the Headlines (1937)
- You Can't Beat Love (1937)
- Forty Naughty Girls (1937)
- Annapolis Salute (1937)
- Bringing Up Baby (1938)
- The Affairs of Annabel (1938)
- Mr. Doodle Kicks Off (1938)
- Annabel Takes a Tour (1938)
- Next Time I Marry (1938)
- The Great Man Votes (1939)
- The Girl and the Gambler (1939)
- The Spellbinder (1939)
- Bad Lands (1939) (uncredited)
- Everything's on Ice (1939)
- Three Sons (1939)
- That's Right – You're Wrong (1939)
- Curtain Call (1940)
- Irene (1940)
- Dance, Girl, Dance (1940)
- No, No Nanette (1940)
- A Girl, a Guy, and a Gob (1941)
- Sunny (1941)
- Weekend for Three (1941)
- Joan of Paris (1942)
- Four Jacks and a Jill (1942)
- Mexican Spitfire Sees a Ghost (1942)
- The Big Street (1942)
- The Falcon's Brother (1942)
- Army Surgeon (1942)
- Hitler's Children (1943)
- Forever and a Day (1943) (uncredited)
- The Sky's the Limit (1943)
- Behind the Rising Sun (1943)
- Around the World (1943)
- Tender Comrade (1943)
- Seven Days Ashore (1944)
- The Master Race (1944)
- Music in Manhattan (1944)
- Betrayal from the East (1945)
- It's in the Bag! (1945)
- The Story of G.I. Joe (1945)
- Pardon My Past (1945)
- Whistle Stop (1946)
- Breakfast in Hollywood (1946)
- The Stranger (1946)
- The Perfect Marriage (1946)
- The Private Affairs of Bel Ami (1947)
- Ivy (1947)
- Ride the Pink Horse (1947)
- A Woman's Vengeance (1947)
- Arch of Triumph (1948)
- All My Sons (1948)
- Mr. Peabody and the Mermaid (1948)
- You Gotta Stay Happy (1948)
- Kiss the Blood Off My Hands (1948)
- We Were Strangers (1949)
- The Lady Gambles (1949)
- Bagdad (1949)
- Buccaneer's Girl (1950)
- Sierra (1950)
- Curtain Call at Cactus Creek (1950)
- Peggy (1950)
- The Desert Hawk (1950)
- Wyoming Mail (1950)
- Katie Did It (1950)
- Up Front (1951)
- Little Egypt (1951)
- The Golden Horde (1951)
- The Raging Tide (1951)
- Flame of Araby (1951)
- The Treasure of Lost Canyon (1952)
- Scarlet Angel (1952)
- The World in His Arms (1952)
- Yankee Buccaneer (1952)
- Because of You (1952)
- Against All Flags (1952)
- Seminole (1953)
- It Happens Every Thursday (1953)
- Take Me to Town (1953)
- The Man from the Alamo (1953)
- Veils of Bagdad (1953)
- Tumbleweed (1953)
- Taza, Son of Cochise (1954)
- Magnificent Obsession (1954)
- Naked Alibi (1954)
- Four Guns to the Border (1954)
- The Sign of the Pagan (1954)
- Crashout (1955)
- Man Without a Star (1955)
- Cult of the Cobra (1955)
- The Man from Bitter Ridge (1955)
- There's Always Tomorrow (1956)
- All That Heaven Allows (1956)
- Miracle in the Rain (1956)
- Congo Crossing (1956)
- Written on the Wind (1956)
- Battle Hymn (1957)
- Mister Cory (1957)
- Man Afraid (1957)
- The Midnight Story (1957)
- Man of a Thousand Faces (1957)
- The Female Animal (1958)
- Touch of Evil (1958)
- A Time to Love and a Time to Die (1958)
- The Thing That Couldn't Die (1958)
- Step Down to Terror (1958)
- Monster on the Campus (1958)
- Imitation of Life (1959)
- This Earth is Mine (1959)
- Platinum High School (1960)
- Portrait in Black (1960)
- Spartacus (1960)
- Midnight Lace (1960)
- The Misfits (1961)
- By Love Possessed (1961)
- Flower Drum Song (1961)
- That Touch of Mink (1962)
- The Interns (1962)
- If a Man Answers (1962)
- Tammy and the Doctor (1963)
- The Thrill of It All (1963)
- Captain Newman, M.D. (1963)
- I'd Rather Be Rich (1964)
- Bus Riley's Back in Town (1965)
- The Art of Love (1965)
- The War Lord (1965)
- Madame X (1966)
- The Appaloosa (1966)
- Texas Across the River (1966)
- Thoroughly Modern Millie (1967)
- Rough Night in Jericho (1967)
- Counterpoint (1968)
- The Secret War of Harry Frigg (1968)
- Madigan (1968)
- The Pink Jungle (1968)
- Eye of the Cat (1969)
- Change of Habit (1969)
- How Do I Love Thee? (1970)
- Tribes (1970)
- The Omega Man (1971)
- Ben (1972)
- Cancel My Reservation (1972)

== Awards and nominations ==
Award	Year	Category	Work	Result	Ref.
Academy Award	1961	Best Cinematography, Color	Spartacus	Won	
Academy Award	1962	Best Cinematography, Color	Flower Drum Song	Nominated	
Primetime Emmy Award	1971	Outstanding Cinematography for a Series or a Single Program	Tribes	Nominated	
Primetime Emmy Award	1973	Outstanding Cinematography for a Series or a Single Program	The Waltons	Nominated	
Laurel Award	1959	Top Cinematography – Color	Imitation of Life	5th place	
