= How Do I Love Thee? =

1970 film by Michael Gordon

- Directed by: Michael Gordon
- Written by: Everett Freeman; Karl Tunberg
- Based on: Let Me Count the Ways by Peter De Vries
- Produced by: Robert Enders; Everett Freeman
- Starring: Jackie Gleason
- Cinematography: Russell Metty
- Edited by: Ronald Sinclair
- Music by: Randy Sparks
- Production companies: ABC Pictures; Freeman-Enders
- Distributed by: Cinerama Releasing Corporation
- Release date: October 1, 1970
- Running time: 110 mins.
- Country: United States
- Language: English
- Budget: $1,975,000
- Box office: $275,000

How Do I Love Thee? is a 1970 American comedy-drama film directed by Michael Gordon. It stars Jackie Gleason and Maureen O'Hara and is based on Peter De Vries's 1965 novel Let Me Count the Ways.

== Plot ==
Tom Waltz, a college professor, finds out that Stanley, his father, is in Lourdes, France. He quickly catches a flight there over his wife Marion's objections.

Stanley is a furniture mover, happily married to Elsie but tempted by Lena, an artist. No actual affair takes place, but Lena does give him a poem as a parting gift that Stanley later enters in a contest. He wins a $10,000 prize and donates the money to Tom's department at the university. Tom is rewarded with a promotion over his rival, Littlefield.

Trouble develops when the "original" poem is exposed as being one of Elizabeth Barrett Browning's sonnets. Littlefield gets the job and Tom's reputation is sullied. Stanley prays for divine intervention and Littlefield promptly dies. Stanley flies to Lourdes to atone and pray for forgiveness, but is relieved when Tom informs him that Littlefield's death occurred before his request for help from above.

== Cast ==
- Jackie Gleason as Stanley Waltz
- Maureen O'Hara as Elsie Waltz
- Shelley Winters as Lena Mervin
- Rosemary Forsyth as Marion Waltz
- Rick Lenz as Tom Waltz
- Jeffrey Orloff as University of Miami student wearing TKE shirt during campus demonstration

== Production notes ==
Filming began in Florida in June 1969. Maureen O'Hara, who accepted the role after a five year absence from the screen, later said she regretted making the film because the script was bad and there were numerous problems on the set.

== Reception ==
How Do I Love Thee? premiered in Los Angeles on October 1, 1970. It was a box office failure and recorded an overall loss of $2,425,000. It earned rentals of $150,000 in North America and $125,000 in other countries.

== Home media ==
How Do I Love Thee? was released on Region 1 Blu-ray by Kino Lorber Studio Classics on May 15, 2018.

== See also ==
- List of American films of 1970
