= West of the Pecos (1934 film) =

1934 film by Phil Rosen

- Directed by: Phil Rosen
- Written by: Milton Krims; John Twist
- Based on: West of the Pecos by Zane Grey
- Produced by: Cliff Reid
- Starring: Richard Dix; Martha Sleeper
- Cinematography: James Van Trees; Russell Metty
- Edited by: Archie Marshek
- Music by: Roy Webb
- Production company: RKO Radio Pictures
- Release dates: December 27, 1934 (New York City); January 4, 1935 (United States)
- Running time: 70 minutes
- Country: United States
- Language: English

West of the Pecos is a 1934 American Western film directed by Phil Rosen and starring Richard Dix and Martha Sleeper. The screenplay was written Milton Krims and John Twist, who adapted the serial of the same name by Zane Grey, appearing beginning in The American Magazine in 1931 and later as the 1937 novel. The film, which is thought to be lost, was remade as West of the Pecos in 1945.
