= The Hangover =

2009 film by Todd Phillips

- Theatrical release poster
- Directed by: Todd Phillips
- Written by: Jon Lucas; Scott Moore
- Produced by: Todd Phillips; Dan Goldberg
- Starring: Bradley Cooper; Ed Helms; Zach Galifianakis; Heather Graham; Justin Bartha; Jeffrey Tambor
- Cinematography: Lawrence Sher
- Edited by: Debra Neil-Fisher
- Music by: Christophe Beck
- Production companies: Legendary Pictures; Green Hat Films (Note: Warner Bros. Pictures and Legendary Pictures serve as co-financiers and co-production companies for The Hangover, while Green Hat Films is credited as the production company.)
- Distributed by: Warner Bros. Pictures
- Release dates: May 30, 2009 (The Hague); June 5, 2009 (United States)
- Running time: 100 minutes
- Country: United States
- Language: English
- Budget: $35 million
- Box office: $469.3 million

The Hangover is a 2009 American comedy film directed by Todd Phillips, and written by Jon Lucas and Scott Moore. It is the first installment in The Hangover trilogy. The film stars Bradley Cooper, Ed Helms, Zach Galifianakis, Heather Graham, Justin Bartha, and Jeffrey Tambor. It tells the story of Phil Wenneck (Cooper), Stu Price (Helms), Alan Garner (Galifianakis), and Doug Billings (Bartha), who travel to Las Vegas for a bachelor party to celebrate the Doug's upcoming marriage. However, Phil, Stu, and Alan wake up with Doug missing and no memory of the previous night, and must piece together what happened so they can get Doug home in time for the wedding.

Lucas and Moore wrote the script after executive producer Chris Bender's friend disappeared and had a large bill after being sent to a strip club. After Lucas and Moore sold it to the studio for $2 million, Phillips and Jeremy Garelick rewrote the script to include a tiger as well as a subplot involving a baby and a police cruiser, and also including boxer Mike Tyson. Filming took place in Nevada for 15 days, and during filming, the three main actors (Cooper, Helms, and Galifianakis) formed a real friendship.

The Hangover was produced by Legendary Pictures and Green Hat Films, and released by Warner Bros. Pictures on June 5, 2009. It was a critical and commercial success and became the tenth-highest-grossing film of 2009, with a worldwide gross of over $467 million. The film won the Golden Globe Award for Best Motion Picture – Musical or Comedy, and received multiple other accolades. It became the highest-grossing R-rated comedy ever in the United States, surpassing a record previously held by Beverly Hills Cop for almost 25 years.

The film was followed by two sequels: The Hangover Part II (2011) and The Hangover Part III (2013).

== Plot ==
Two days before his wedding, Doug Billings goes to Las Vegas with his best friends Phil Wenneck, a teacher, and Stu Price, a dentist. They are accompanied by Alan Garner, his childish future brother-in-law. Sid, the father of Doug's fiancée Tracy, lends Doug his vintage Mercedes-Benz W111 for the trip. They book a suite at Caesars Palace and celebrate by sneaking onto the hotel rooftop and drinking Jägermeister.

The next day, Phil, Stu, and Alan awaken, unable to remember the previous night. Doug is nowhere to be found, Stu's tooth is missing, the suite is a mess, a Bengal tiger is in the bathroom, and a baby is in the closet. They see Doug's mattress impaled on a statue outside, and when they ask for their Mercedes, the valet delivers a Las Vegas police cruiser.

Retracing their steps, the trio travels to a hospital, discovering they were drugged with Rohypnol, causing their memory loss, and that they went there from a chapel the previous night. At the chapel, they learn that Stu married a call girl named Jade, despite his relationship with his controlling girlfriend Melissa. Outside the chapel, the trio is ambushed by a gang of men demanding to know where "he" is. Bewildered, they flee and track down Jade, who is revealed to be the baby's mother.

The police arrest them for having stolen the cruiser. To get the Mercedes out of impound and an early release, the trio unwittingly volunteer to be targets for a taser demonstration. While driving the car, the trio discover a naked Chinese man named Leslie Chow in the trunk; he beats them up and flees. Alan confesses that he was the person who drugged their drinks with what he believed to be ecstasy, to ensure they had a good night.

Returning to their suite, they encounter Mike Tyson, who knocks Alan unconscious and demands they return his tiger. After Stu sedates it, they load it into the Mercedes and drive to Tyson's mansion. The tiger awakens, scratches Phil's neck and damages the car. They push the car to the mansion and deliver the tiger. Tyson shows them security camera footage of their drunken behavior from the night before, revealing they lost Doug only after returning to the hotel.

While driving back, their car is rammed by a black Cadillac Escalade manned by Chow and his gang from the chapel. Chow accuses them of kidnapping him and stealing $80,000 in poker chips. As they deny it, he tells them he has Doug and threatens to kill him if the chips are not returned. Unable to find Chow's chips, Alan, with help from Stu and Jade, uses his knowledge of card counting to win $82,400 playing blackjack.

They meet Chow in the Mojave Desert to exchange the chips for Doug, only to find that the "Doug" in question is actually the drug dealer Black Doug, who accidentally sold the wrong drugs to Alan earlier. With the real Doug's wedding set to occur in five hours, Phil calls Tracy to tell her they cannot find him. Simultaneously, Black Doug remarks that someone who takes roofies is more likely to end up on the floor than on the roof, causing Stu to deduce where Doug is.

The trio return to Caesars Palace to find a dazed and sunburned Doug on the roof. He was moved there as a joke and forgotten when the roofies wore off; Doug threw his mattress onto a statue to signal for help. Before leaving, Stu arranges to meet Jade for a date the following week.

With no flights, the four drive home in the damaged Mercedes, where Doug reveals he has Chow's original $80,000. Despite their late arrival, Doug and Tracy are married. At the reception, Stu gleefully breaks up with Melissa after she sees his tooth gone. Alan finds Stu's camera with photos from their Las Vegas night, and they decide to view the pictures once before deleting them. The photos play over the closing credits.

== Cast ==
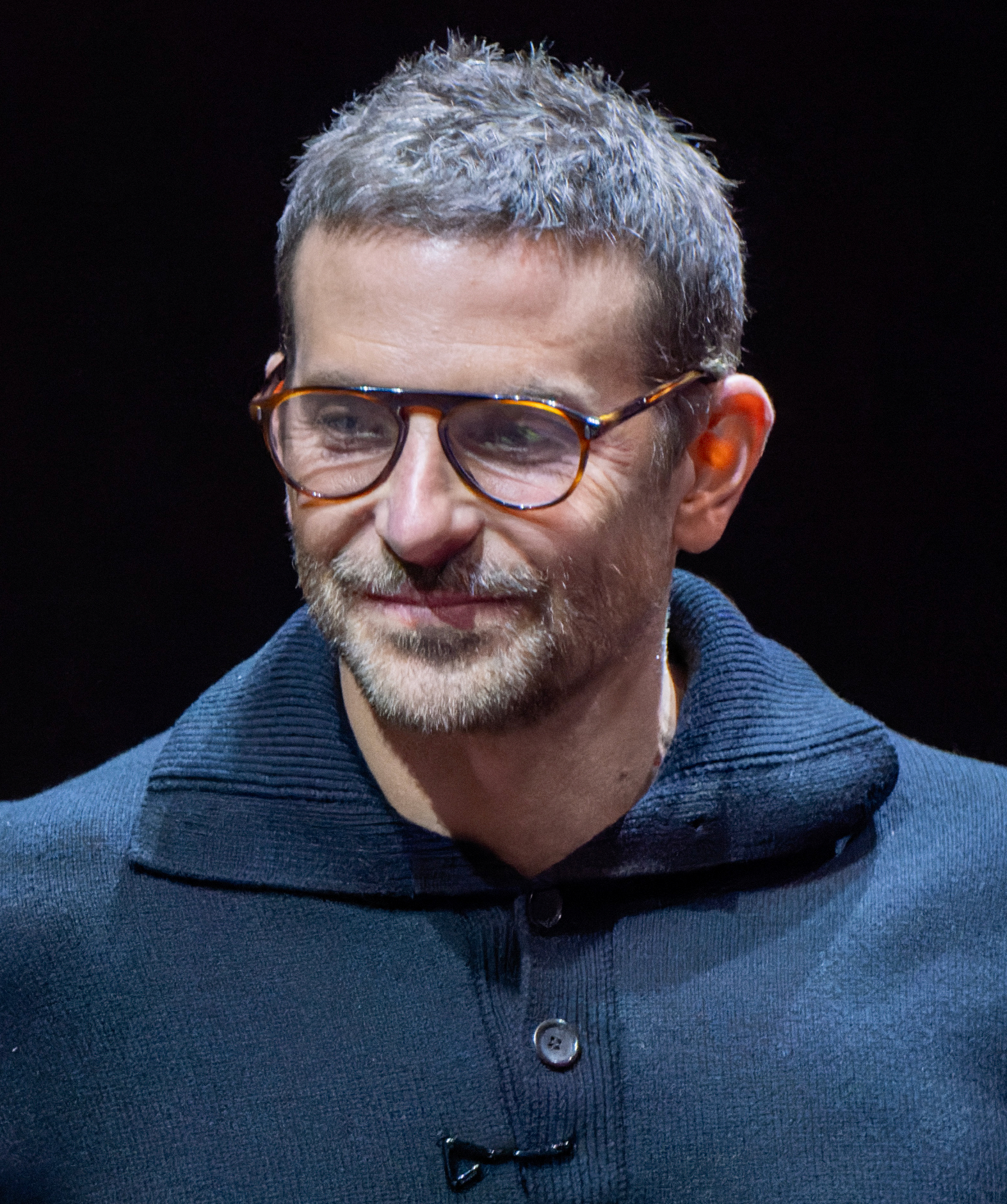
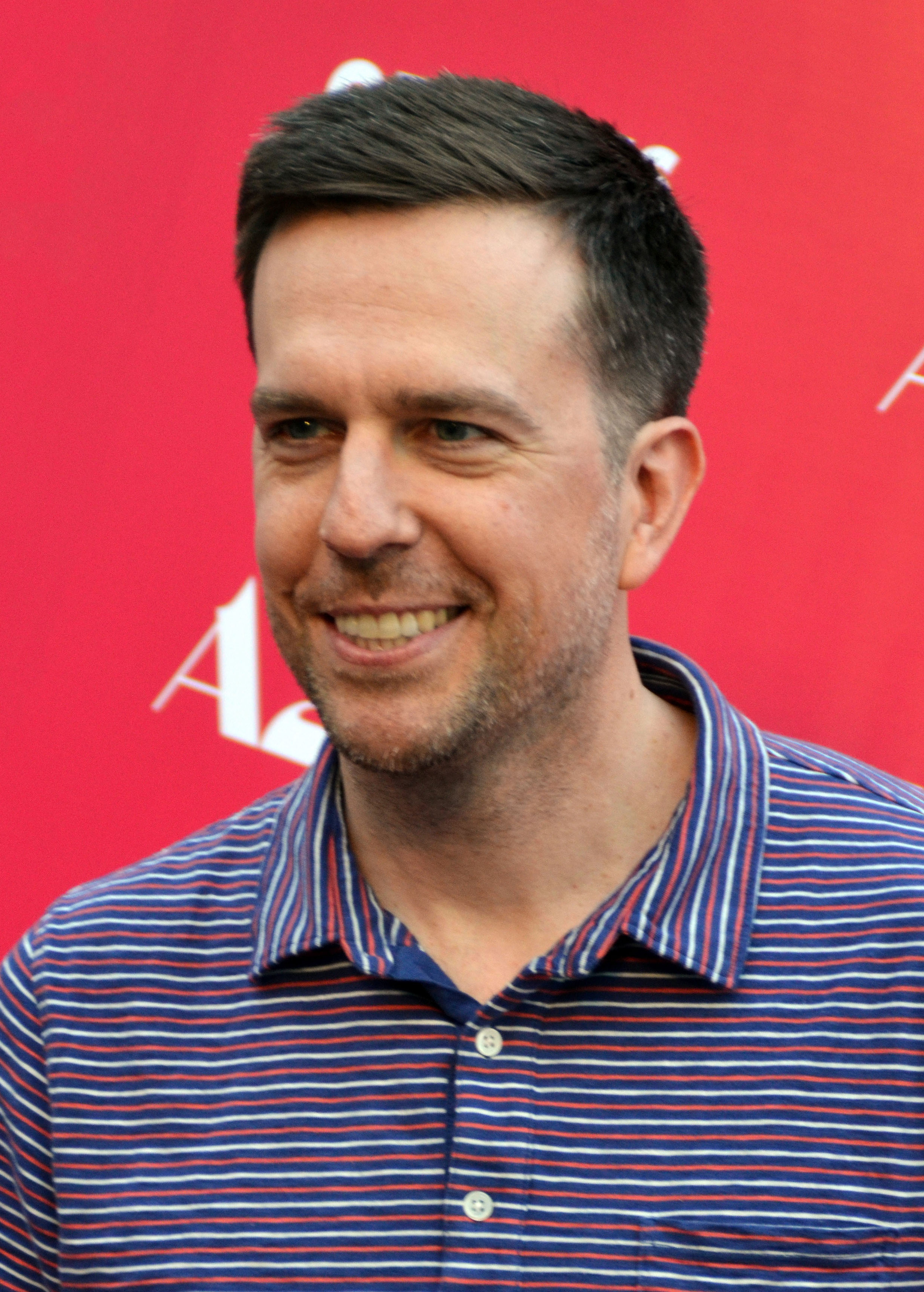
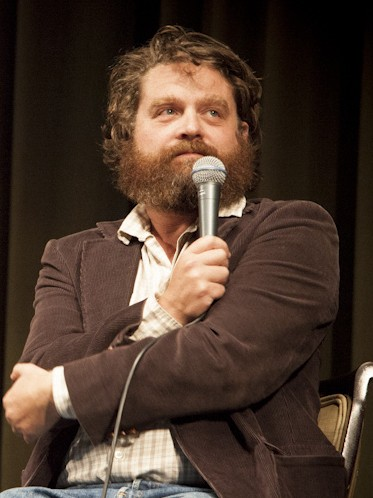
(Left to right) Bradley Cooper (pictured in 2023), Ed Helms (2014), and Zach Galifianakis (2012)
- Bradley Cooper as Phil Wenneck, a teacher and the leader of the Wolfpack
- Ed Helms as Dr. Stu Price, a dentist
- Zach Galifianakis as Alan Garner, Doug's socially inept future brother-in-law, who has ADHD and acts childishly and erratically
- Justin Bartha as Doug Billings, the groom, who goes missing for most of the film
- Heather Graham as Jade, a stripper and escort
- Sasha Barrese as Tracy Garner, Doug's bride and Alan's sister
- Jeffrey Tambor as Sid Garner, Tracy's and Alan's father
- Ken Jeong as Mr. Leslie Chow, a flamboyant Chinese gangster
- Rachael Harris as Melissa, Stu's uptight, abusive and unfaithful girlfriend
- Mike Tyson as himself
  Tyson originally refused to appear in the film, but he changed his mind when he found out that Todd Phillips had directed Old School, which Tyson liked. Tyson later said that working on the film convinced him to change his lifestyle.
- Mike Epps as Black Doug, a drug dealer who is mistaken for Doug
- Jernard Burks as Leonard
- Rob Riggle as Officer Franklin
- Cleo King as Officer Garden
- Bryan Callen as Eddie, the wedding organizer
- Matt Walsh as Dr. Valsh
- Ian Anthony Dale as Chow's #1
- Michael Li as Chow's #2
- Sondra Currie as Linda Garner, Tracy's and Alan's mother
- Gillian Vigman as Stephanie Wenneck, Phil's wife
- Murray Gershenz as Felix (hospital elderly man)
- Nathalie Fay as Lisa (Caesar's Palace Clerk)

Todd Phillips, the film's director, appears as Mr. Creepy, who appears briefly in an elevator. Professional skateboarder Mike Vallely portrays Neeco, the high-speed tuxedo delivery man. Las Vegas personalities Wayne Newton and Carrot Top appear as themselves in the photo slide show.

== Production ==
"I think part of what's special about this movie is that none of the comedy comes from the characters being clever, like you see in a lot of sitcoms or movies, where the characters actually have a funny sense of humor. That's not the case in this movie. So as an actor, you can really play the intensity and gravity and seriousness of the moment, and just rely on the circumstances being funny. The joke is kind of the situation you're in, or the way you're reacting to something, as opposed to the characters just saying something witty."

— Ed Helms

=== Writing ===
The plot of The Hangover was inspired by a real event that happened to Tripp Vinson, a producer and friend of executive producer Chris Bender. Vinson had gone missing from his own Las Vegas bachelor party, blacking out and waking up "in a strip club being threatened with a very, very large bill I was supposed to pay".

Jon Lucas and Scott Moore sold the original script of The Hangover to Warner Bros. Pictures for over $2 million. The story was about three friends who lose the groom at his Las Vegas bachelor party and then must retrace their steps to figure out what happened. It was then rewritten by Jeremy Garelick and director Todd Phillips, who added additional elements such as Mike Tyson and his tiger, the baby, and the police cruiser. However, Lucas and Moore retained writing credit in accordance with the Writers Guild of America, West's screenwriting credit system.

=== Casting ===
Ed Helms, Zach Galifianakis, and Bradley Cooper were all casual acquaintances before The Hangover was filmed, which Helms said he believed helped in establishing a rapport and chemistry amongst their characters. Helms credited Phillips for "bringing together three guys who are really different, but really appreciate each others' humor and sensibilities". Helms also said the fact that the story of the three characters growing closer and bonding forged the friendship between the three actors: "As you spend 14 hours a day together for three months, you see a lot of sides of somebody. We went through the wringer together, and that shared experience really made us genuine buddies."

Lindsay Lohan was in talks with Phillips for the role of Jade in the film but was ultimately not cast due to being considered too young for what was discussed.

=== Filming ===
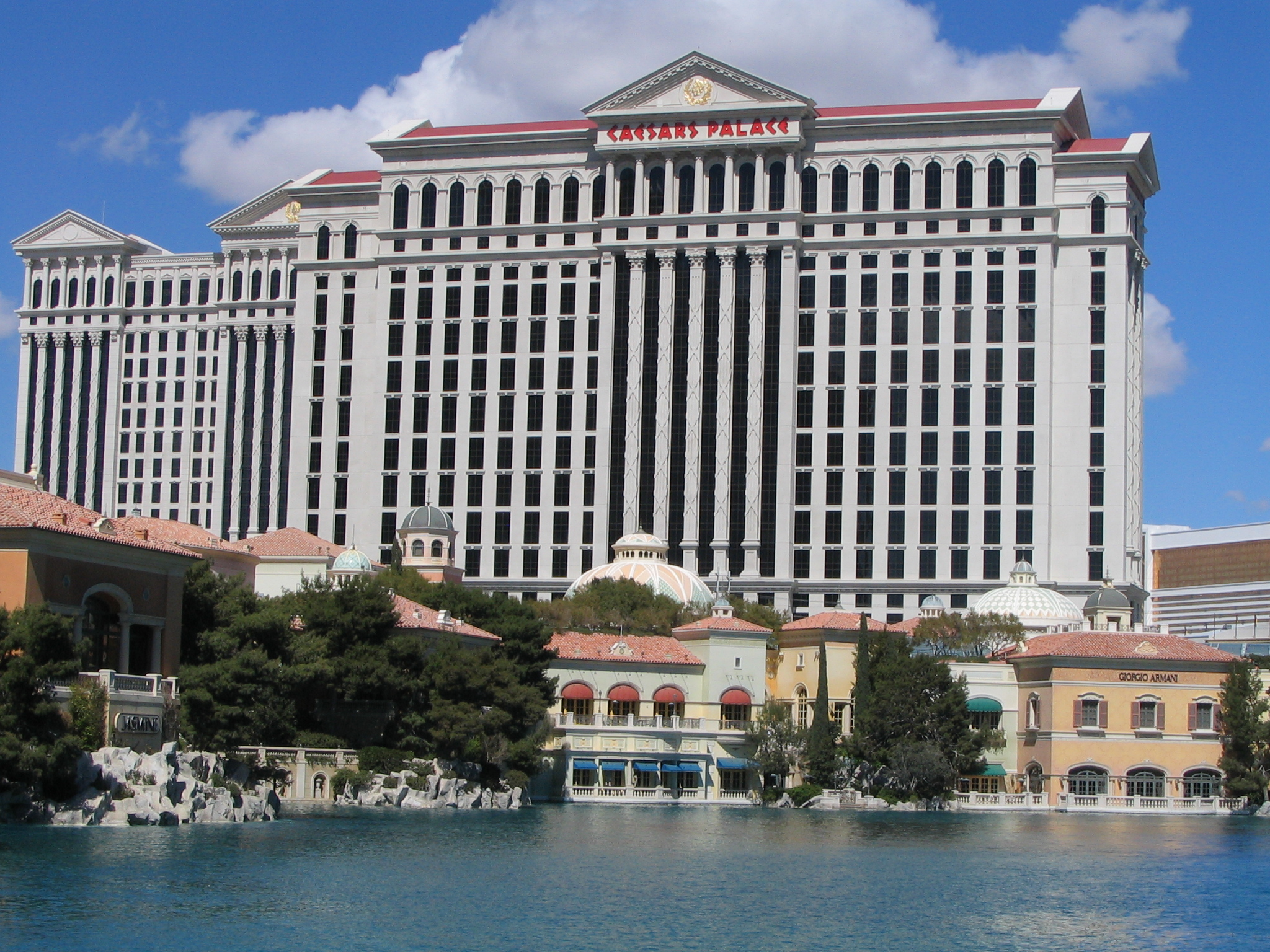
Caesars Palace

On a budget of $35 million, principal photography took place in Nevada for fifteen days.

The Hangover was mostly filmed on location at Caesars Palace, including the front desk, lobby, suite, entrance drive, pools, corridors, elevators, and roof, but the suite damaged in the film was built on a soundstage. While the hospital, the police station, Mike Tyson's house and several interior scenes were filmed on soundstages in the Los Angeles area, other Vegas locations included the exteriors of Atomic Liquors and the El Cortez Hotel and Casino on Fremont Street. The Bungalows Hostel (then known as Hostel Cat) featured a facade built by the production team to appear as a wedding chapel. Jade's home was depicted at the Wild Wild West Gambling Hall & Hotel, and Alan is portrayed counting cards while playing blackjack at The Riviera; both buildings have since been demolished. The scene where Mr. Chow jumps out of the trunk of the Mercedes-Benz 220SE and assaults the protagonists with a crowbar was filmed at the intersection of East Mandalay Bay Road and Haven Street, which remains a dirt lot adjacent to the Las Vegas Strip.

Since there was a piano in the real suite, Phillips allowed Helms to improvise a scene with the piano on the soundstage, which became known as "Stu's song" in the film. According to Helms in a 2011 interview on The Graham Norton Show, he had to be tutored on how to use a piano for the scene.

Helms said filming The Hangover was more physically demanding than any other role he had done, and that he lost eight pounds while making the film. He said the most difficult day of shooting was the scene when Mr. Chow rams his car and attacks the main characters, which Helms said required many takes and was very painful, such as when a few of the punches and kicks accidentally landed and when his knees and shins were hurt while being pulled out of a window. The missing tooth was not created with prosthetics or visual effects, but is naturally occurring: Helms never had an adult incisor grow, and got a dental implant as a teenager, which was removed for filming.

Jeong stated that his jumping on Cooper's neck naked wasn't a part of the script, but rather improvisation on their part. It was added with Phillips' blessing. Jeong also stated that he had to receive his wife's permission to appear nude in the film.

Phillips tried to convince the actors to allow him to use a real Taser until Warner Bros. lawyers intervened.

Regarding the explicit shots in the final photo slide show in which his character is seen receiving fellatio in an elevator, Galifianakis confirmed that a prosthesis was used for the scene, and that he had been more embarrassed than anyone else during the creation of the shot. "You would think that I wouldn't be the one who was embarrassed; I was extremely embarrassed. I really didn't even want it in there. I offered Todd's assistant a lot of money to convince him to take it out of the movie. I did. But it made it in there."

The scenes involving animals were filmed mostly with trained animals. Trainers and safety equipment were digitally removed from the final version. Some prop animals were used, such as when the tiger was hidden under a sheet and being moved on a baggage cart. Such efforts were given an "Outstanding" rating by the American Humane Association for the monitoring and treatment of the animals.

=== Music ===
The film's score was composed by Christophe Beck. The film featured 20 songs, consisting of music by Kanye West, Danzig, The Donnas, Usher, Phil Collins, The Belle Stars, T.I., Wolfmother and The Dan Band, who tend to feature in Phillips' films as the inappropriate, bad-mouthed wedding band. The Dan Band's cover of the 50 Cent single "Candy Shop" appeared in Part I. Pro-skater and punk musician Mike Vallely was invited with his band, Revolution Mother, to write a song for the film and also makes a cameo appearance as the high speed tuxedo delivery guy.

"Right Round" by Flo Rida is played over the ending credits. The film uses the Kanye West song "Can't Tell Me Nothing" for which Zach Galifianakis made an alternative music video.

== Release ==
=== Box office ===
The Hangover was a financial success. As of December 17, 2009, it had grossed $467,416,722, of which $277,322,503 was in Canada and the United States. It was the tenth-highest-grossing film of 2009 in the world, the sixth-highest-grossing film of 2009 in the United States and the highest-grossing R-rated comedy ever in the United States, surpassing a record previously held by Beverly Hills Cop for almost 25 years. Out of all R-rated films, As of 2026, it is the twelfth-highest-grossing ever in the United States, behind Deadpool & Wolverine, The Odyssey, The Passion of the Christ, Deadpool, American Sniper, Joker, Oppenheimer, It, Deadpool 2, The Matrix Reloaded, and Sinners. However, adjusted for inflation The Hangover earned less than half the total earned by Beverly Hills Cop and is out grossed by several comedies, including Porky's.

On its first day of release in the United States, the film drew $16,734,033 on approximately 4,500 screens at 3,269 sites, and exceeded the big-budgeted Land of the Lost—the other major new release of the weekend—for first day's box office takings. Although initial studio projections had the Disney·Pixar film Up holding on to the number one slot for a second consecutive weekend, final revised figures, bolstered by a surprisingly strong Sunday showing, ultimately had The Hangover finishing first for the weekend, with $44,979,319 from 3,269 theaters, averaging $13,759 per venue, narrowly edging out Up for the top spot, and more than twice that of Land of the Lost, which finished third with $18.8 million. The film exceeded Warner Bros.' expectations—which had anticipated it would finish third behind Up and Land of the Lost—benefiting from positive word-of-mouth and critical praise, and a generally negative buzz for Land of the Lost. It stayed at the number one position in its second weekend, grossing another $32,794,387, from 3,355 theaters for an average of $9,775 per venue, and bringing the 10-day amount to $104,768,489.

=== Home media ===
The Hangover was released on DVD, Blu-ray, and UMD on December 15, 2009, by Warner Home Video. There is a single-disc theatrical version featuring both fullscreen and widescreen options (DVD only), as well as a widescreen two-disc unrated version of the film, also containing the theatrical version (DVD, Blu-ray, and UMD). The unrated version is approximately seven minutes longer than the theatrical version. The unrated version is on disc one and the theatrical version, digital copy, and the different features are on disc two. The Hangover beat Inglourious Basterds and G-Force (the latter of which also starred Galifianakis) in first week DVD and Blu-ray sales, as well as rentals, selling more than 8.6 million units and making it the best-selling comedy ever on DVD and Blu-ray, beating the previous record held by My Big Fat Greek Wedding.

== Reception ==
=== Critical response ===
On Rotten Tomatoes, The Hangover has an approval rating of 79% based on 240 reviews with an average rating of 6.8/10. The site's critical consensus reads, "With a clever script and hilarious interplay among the cast, The Hangover nails just the right tone of raunchy humor, and the non-stop laughs overshadow any flaw." On Metacritic, the film has a score of 73 out of 100 based on 31 critics, indicating "generally favorable reviews". Audiences polled by CinemaScore gave the film an average grade of "A" on an A+ to F scale.

Roger Ebert of the Chicago Sun-Times gave it three-and-a-half stars out of four and praised the film for its comedic approach. A. O. Scott of The New York Times praised Cooper, Helms and Galifianakis for their performances in the film as well as Todd Phillips for its direction. Scott later went on to say that the film is "safe as milk". Mick LaSalle of the San Francisco Chronicle also praised Phillips' direction. LaSalle also praised the film's comedic scenes and called it "the funniest movie so far this year [2009]". Betsy Sharkey of the Los Angeles Times praised the film for its perverseness. Sharkey also said that the film is "filled with moments as softhearted as they are crude, as forgiving as unforgivable". Although Joe Leydon of Variety criticized the film's trailers and TV-spots for its "beer-and-boobs, party-hearty farce", he also praised the film for its cleverness.

Conversely, Richard Corliss of Time said that "virtually every joke [in the film] either is visible long before it arrives or extends way past its expiration date" and added, "Whatever the other critics say, this is a bromance so primitive it's practically Bro-Magnon." In his review in The Baltimore Sun, Michael Sragow called the film a "foul mesh of cheap cleverness and vulgarity." Joe Neumaier of the Daily News gave the film two-and-a-half out of five stars and noted, "Amusing as it is, it never feels real. That may not seem like a big deal—a lot of funny movies play by their own rules—except that The Hangover keeps doubling-down on the outlandishness." Family-oriented reviewers have harangued the film, noting that Galifianakis said he tried to forbid his own mother from seeing it and that he yells at parents of kids who tell him they like the film.

Anton Trees criticised the film for what he viewed as the weak character development, especially in its female characters. Critics also focused on misogyny and stereotyping, in particular the portrayal of the Asian gangster. Ebert, despite his praise, stated, "I won't go so far as to describe it as a character study", and said that the film is more than the sum of its parts—parts that may at first seem generic or clichéd, since similar films (such as Very Bad Things) have already explored the idea of a weekend in Vegas gone wrong. The film's premise has several similarities to Dude, Where's My Car? Both films are about "a couple guys waking up after a night of getting trashed, only to find they are missing something important", whose adventures include "a trail of clues, a missing car, dubious encounters with strippers and wild animals, a brush with the law and gangs chasing them for something they don't realize they have".

=== Accolades ===
Award	Date of ceremony	Category	Recipients	Result
American Film Institute Awards	December 14, 2009	Top 10 Films	The Hangover	Won
American Cinema Editors	February 14, 2010	Best Edited Feature Film - Comedy or Musical	Debra Neil-Fisher	Won
Art Directors Guild	February 13, 2010	Excellence in Production Design for a Contemporary Film	Bill Brzeski	Nominated
Artios Awards	November 2, 2009	Outstanding Achievement in Casting - Feature - Studio or Independent Comedy	Juel Bestrop and Seth Yanklewitz	Won
British Academy Film Awards	February 21, 2010	Best Original Screenplay	Jon Lucas and Scott Moore	Nominated
British Comedy Awards	December 12, 2009	Best Comedy Film	The Hangover	Nominated
Critics' Choice Movie Awards	January 15, 2010	Best Comedy	The Hangover	Won
Detroit Film Critics Society	December 11, 2009	Best Ensemble	The Hangover	Won
Empire Awards	March 28, 2010	Best Comedy	The Hangover	Nominated
Golden Globe Awards	January 17, 2010	Best Motion Picture – Musical or Comedy	The Hangover	Won
Houston Film Critics Society	December 19, 2009	Best Supporting Actor	Zach Galifianakis	Nominated
MTV Movie Awards	June 6, 2010	Best Movie	The Hangover	Nominated
MTV Movie Awards	June 6, 2010	Best Breakout Star	Zach Galifianakis	Nominated
MTV Movie Awards	June 6, 2010	Best Comedic Performance	Bradley Cooper	Nominated
MTV Movie Awards	June 6, 2010	Best Comedic Performance	Zach Galifianakis	Won
MTV Movie Awards	June 6, 2010	Best Villain	Ken Jeong	Nominated
MTV Movie Awards	June 6, 2010	Best WTF Moment	Ken Jeong	Won
People's Choice Awards	January 6, 2010	Favorite Movie	The Hangover	Nominated
People's Choice Awards	January 6, 2010	Favorite Comedy Movie	The Hangover	Nominated
Satellite Awards	December 20, 2009	Best Actor in a Motion Picture Musical or Comedy	Bradley Cooper	Nominated
St. Louis Gateway Film Critics Association	December 21, 2009	Best Comedy Film	The Hangover	Won
Teen Choice Awards	August 9, 2009	Choice Movie – Comedy	The Hangover	Nominated
Teen Choice Awards	August 9, 2009	Choice Summer Movie – Comedy	The Hangover	Nominated
Teen Choice Awards	August 9, 2009	Choice Summer Movie Star – Male	Bradley Cooper	Nominated
Teen Choice Awards	August 9, 2009	Choice Movie Villain	Ken Jeong	Nominated
Teen Choice Awards	August 9, 2009	Choice Movie Rockstar Moment	Bradley Cooper, Zach Galifianakis, Ed Helms and Mike Tyson	Nominated
Writers Guild of America	February 20, 2010	Best Original Screenplay	Jon Lucas and Scott Moore	Nominated

== Impact and legacy ==
By depicting and celebrating Las Vegas as the "ultimate guys' getaway", The Hangover had a major impact on Caesars Palace and Las Vegas. It was reported in 2013 that as of that year, guests were still continuing to quote to Caesars Palace staff two lines from the film's check-in scene: "Did Caesar live here?" and "Do you know if the hotel is pager-friendly?" As a result of the film, Hangover-themed slot machines became popular at casinos throughout the Las Vegas Valley, the Caesars Palace gift shop sold tens of thousands of Hangover-related souvenirs, and the Las Vegas Convention and Visitors Authority received numerous inquiries from persons interested in recreating some of the film's most wild scenes, such as those involving a tiger.

The Las Vegas branch of Madame Tussauds added Hangover-themed rooms recreating the hotel room and the wedding chapel and a tie-in rooftop cocktail bar.

In 2018, Hasbro issued a parody version of their board game Clue where players have to locate a missing friend somewhere in the city after a wild night of carousing.

In 2025, the film was among those voted for the "Readers' Choice" edition of The New York Times' list of "The 100 Best Movies of the 21st Century," finishing at number 234.

In the 2025 film Nirvanna the Band the Show the Movie, the fictionalized version of Matt Johnson attends a screening of The Hangover in a movie theatre in Toronto, and is disturbed when the entire audience bursts into laughter at a scene where Ed Helms' character is repeatedly called a homophobic slur. This causes him to realize that he has travelled back in time to 2008; a test screening was shown in Toronto that year.

== Sequels ==
Principal photography of The Hangover Part II began in October 2010, with Bradley Cooper, Ed Helms, Justin Bartha, and Zach Galifianakis returning, in addition to Ken Jeong who appears in a much larger role. The film was released on May 26, 2011.

Filming of The Hangover Part III began in September 2012, and was released on May 23, 2013.

== See also ==
- List of films set in Las Vegas
