= List of films set in Las Vegas =

This is a list of films set in Las Vegas.

Shot	Released	Title	Comments
	1936	Boulder Dam	
	1941	Las Vegas Nights	
	1944	Moon Over Las Vegas	
	1946	Heldorado	
	1949	The Lady Gambles	
	1952	The Las Vegas Story	
	1952	Sky Full of Moon	
	1954	The Atomic Kid	
	1956	Crashing Las Vegas	
	1956	Meet Me in Las Vegas	
	1957	The Amazing Colossal Man	
	1960	Ocean's Eleven	
	1964	Viva Las Vegas	
	1966	The Las Vegas Hillbillys	
	1968	They Came to Rob Las Vegas	
	1969	Where It's At	
	1970	The Grasshopper	
	1970	The Only Game in Town	
	1971	Diamonds Are Forever	
	1972	The Godfather	
	1972	The Night Stalker	
	1977	The Gauntlet	
	1978	Corvette Summer	Dantley spots his stolen car as he works at a Las Vegas car wash.
	1982	One from the Heart	
	1982	Lookin' to Get Out	Filmed inside the original MGM Grand. Angelina Jolie's film debut.
	1985	Lost in America	Linda loses her and David's savings playing roulette at the Desert Inn.
	1985	Fever Pitch	A reporter becomes a gaming addict while doing a piece on a gambler in Las Vegas.
	1987	Over the Top	The World Armwrestling Championship is held in Las Vegas.
	1988	Rain Man	An autistic savant uses his skills to count cards at blackjack at Caesars Palace.
	1988	Midnight Run	
	1989	Las Vegas Bloodbath	
	1991	Harley Davidson and the Marlboro Man	
	1991	Bugsy	
	1991	Father Christmas	The titular character goes on holiday here after visiting Scotland.
	1992	Honey, I Blew Up The Kid	A giant two year-old toddler causes havoc on Fremont Street.
	1992	Cool World	Filmed at the Union Plaza Hotel in Fremont Street.
	1992	Honeymoon in Vegas	
	1993	Indecent Proposal	Filmed at the Westgate (formerly Las Vegas Hilton).
	1995	Casino	Filmed at the Riviera and other locations throughout Las Vegas.
	1995	Showgirls	Filmed at the Stardust and other locations throughout Las Vegas.
	1995	Leaving Las Vegas	
	1995	Leprechaun 3	
	1996	Hard Eight	Scene in the MGM Grand.
	1996	Swingers	
	1996	Mars Attacks!	
	1996	Beavis and Butt-head Do America	
	1997	Austin Powers: International Man of Mystery	Filmed at the Riviera Hotel and Casino and on the Strip.
	1997	Con Air	The finale takes place in Las Vegas.
	1997	Vegas Vacation	Filmed at The Mirage and Fremont Street.
	1997	Fools Rush In	
	1998	Fear and Loathing in Las Vegas	
	1998	Speedway Junky	
	1998	Very Bad Things	The bachelor party scenes are set in Las Vegas.
	1999	Go	
	1999	The Conmen in Vegas	Scene in the Las Vegas Strip.
	1999	Wishmaster 2: Evil Never Dies	
	2000	The Flintstones in Viva Rock Vegas	
	2000	Pay It Forward	
	2000	Luckytown	
	2001	3000 Miles to Graceland	
	2001	Rush Hour 2	A villain is tracked to the Red Dragon Casino in Las Vegas.
	2001	Rat Race	
	2001	Ocean's Eleven	
	2003	The Cooler	
	2003	George of the Jungle 2	
	2003	Looney Tunes: Back in Action	
	2004	Kangaroo Jack: G'Day U.S.A.!	
	2005	Double Down	
	2005	Miss Congeniality 2: Armed and Fabulous	
	2005	"¡Mucha Lucha!: The Return of El Maléfico"	
	2005	Domino	Shot at the Stratosphere Hotel and Casino.
	2006	The Ant Bully	
	2007	Resident Evil: Extinction	
	2007	Ocean's Thirteen	Filming locations included the Bellagio, THEHotel at Mandalay Bay, McCarran International Airport, Lake Las Vegas in Henderson, Nevada.
	2007	Lucky You	
	2007	Next	
	2008	The Grand	A poker tournament is held at the Golden Nugget.
	2008	21	
	2008	What Happens in Vegas	
	2008	Bolt	
	2009	Up in the Air	Bingham takes a picture of the Luxor Las Vegas for his sister's wedding.
	2009	Race to Witch Mountain	
	2009	2012	Las Vegas is destroyed by a large earthquake.
	2009	The Hangover	A bachelor party goes horribly wrong when the groom goes missing and his friends can not remember what happened the night before.
	2010	Percy Jackson & the Olympians: The Lightning Thief	Percy travels to Las Vegas and enters a fictional casino modeled after Caesar's Palace.
	2010	Get Him to the Greek	
	2011	Fright Night	
	2011	Rango	Set in the desert around Las Vegas.
	2012	Lay the Favorite	
	2013	The Hangover Part III	
	2013	Behind the Candelabra	
	2013	Last Vegas	
	2013	The Incredible Burt Wonderstone	
	2013	Now You See Me	
	2014	Godzilla	The female MUTO destroys Las Vegas.
	2014	Step Up: All In	
	2014	Earth to Echo	
	2014	The Bride From Vegas	
	2014	Think Like a Man Too	
	2015	Wild Card	
	2015	Paul Blart: Mall Cop 2	
	2016	Jason Bourne	Bourne pursues the Asset on the Las Vegas Strip.
	2016	The Trust	
	2017	Sleepless	
	2017	The Boss Baby	
	2017	What Happened in Vegas	
	2018	Sarkar	
	2019	Kaaviyyan	
	2019	Las Vegas Vietnam: The Movie	
	2019	7 Days to Vegas	
	2020	Date in Vegas	
	2020	Vegas High	
	2020	Fatale	
	2021	Army of the Dead	
	2021	Engaged in Vegas	
	2022	Elvis	
	2024	Anora	Locations include Palms Casino; Fremont Street Experience; A Little White Wedding Chapel.
	2024	Venom: The Last Dance	Part of the 2nd arc is set in several locations in and around Las Vegas, including the Paris hotel and casino and the Las Vegas Strip.
	2024	On Swift Horses	

== See also ==
- List of films shot in Las Vegas
- List of television shows set in Las Vegas
