= Texas Across the River =

1966 film by Michael Gordon

Texas Across The River
- Theatrical release poster
- Directed by: Michael Gordon
- Written by: Wells Root; Harold Greene; Ben Starr
- Produced by: Harry Keller
- Starring: Dean Martin; Alain Delon; Rosemary Forsyth; Joey Bishop
- Cinematography: Russell Metty
- Edited by: Gene Milford
- Music by: Frank De Vol (as DeVol)
- Color process: Technicolor
- Production company: Universal Pictures
- Distributed by: Universal Pictures
- Release dates: October 26, 1966 (Houston, Texas)
- Running time: 101 minutes
- Country: United States
- Language: English
- Box office: $4.5 million (est. US/ Canada rentals); 707,549 admissions (France)

Texas Across The River is a 1966 American Techniscope comedy Western film directed by Michael Gordon and starring Dean Martin, Alain Delon, Rosemary Forsyth and Joey Bishop.

== Plot ==
Phoebe Ann Naylor is about to be wed to Don Andrea Baldazar, El Duce de la Casala, in Louisiana in 1845. The festivities are broken up by the arrival of Yancey Cottle and his relatives, who form a U.S. Dragoons troop under the command of Cottle's cousin, Captain Rodney Stimpson. Yancy, who wishes to marry Phoebe himself, duels Don Andrea, but is accidentally defenestrated and killed by the actions of his comrade, Lt. Howard, who then accuses Don Andrea of murder. Andrea flees, promising to meet up with Phoebe Ann across the river in Texas, not yet a U.S. state.

In the wake of the failed wedding, Phoebe Ann is sent to Texas to lie low until the scandal blows over. Sam Hollis, a trek guide, and his Indian sidekick Kronk hire Don Andrea as an additional escort because the Army refuses to provide troops for their latest job until Texas has become an official part of the Union. Along the way, Hollis and Andrea, whom Hollis nicknames "Baldy", get into a clash of cultures, but also end up rescuing Indian maiden Lonetta from getting ritually killed by a Comanche medicine man. At the same time, the Comanches under their chief, Iron Jacket (who is named after his Spanish breastplate), and his inept son Yellow Knife prepare an attack on Phoebe Ann's wagon train and the other settlers in the area. Hollis and Kronk join the trek, where Hollis becomes romantically interested in Phoebe Ann, and despite his lack of social graces gradually manages to win her heart.

Andrea decides to settle down, and with Lonetta's help tames a small number of wild cattle, inspiring the other local settlers to do the same. Eventually, Andrea discovers Phoebe Ann's presence and Hollis' designs on her, but before they can duel, news arrive that Texas has now joined the Union, and Cpt. Stimpson's arriving cavalry detachment forces Andrea and Lonetta to flee into the wilderness. The Comanches launch an attack against the settlers, and with the soldiers too fixated on capturing him to take notice, Andrea heroically lures them back to the town. Meanwhile, the Comanches' attack is broken up by a stampede of the newly tamed cattle from a fire.

In the aftermath, Andrea is arrested and about to be executed despite Phoebe Ann's testimony and protests on his behalf. In desperation, Phoebe Ann pushes Howard against Cpt. Stimpson, which causes the latter to topple into a watering trough and thus exonerate Andrea. Hollis and Andrea prepare to settle their differences once and for all, but just before things get serious, Phoebe Ann and Lonetta start a fight in order to distract their respective love interests from killing each other. The disgraced Howard, who was assigned to finish Andrea's grave for the prospective loser of the duel, accidentally hits a crude oil deposit. As the oil sprays to the surface, the dismayed settlers are faced with the prospect of having to relocate their town, while the worn-out Comanches simply return home.

== Cast ==
- Dean Martin as Sam Hollis
- Alain Delon as Don Andrea
- Rosemary Forsyth as Phoebe
- Joey Bishop as Kronk
- Tina Aumont as Lonetta (credited as Tina Marquand)
- Peter Graves as Captain Stimpson
- Michael Ansara as Iron Jacket
- Linden Chiles as Yellow Knife
- Andrew Prine as Lieutenant Sibley
- Stuart Anderson as Yancy
- Roy Barcroft as Morton
- George Wallace as Willet
- Don Beddoe as Mr. Naylor
- Kelly Thordsen as Turkey Shoot Boss
- Nora Marlowe as Emma
- John Harmon as Gabe
- Richard Farnsworth as Medicine Man (credited as Dick Farnsworth)

== Production ==
Ken Annakin was offered the film to direct but felt the schedule was too short and turned it down.

Filming began January 1966 with the film being shot in Techniscope. Portions of the film were shot at North Ranch in Thousand Oaks, California as well as San Diego, California.

Michael Gordon later said he enjoyed making the film "from most points of view. I didn't enjoy working with Dean Martin because he didn't have the attitude toward work that I do. He liked to play around and just wing a performance. We were on totally different wave lengths. But I liked the idea of the picture, and some of the things in it I thought were very funny. Ben Starr worked on that screenplay, and he and I had a very close collaboration."

== Musical score ==
The title song for the film, also known as "Texas Across the River", was written by Sammy Cahn and James Van Heusen and performed by The Kingston Trio.

== Home media ==
The film is now available on DVD through Universal's MOD program. The VHS version is long out of print. On January 5, 2021, it was released on Region 1 Blu-Ray by Kino Lorber.
