= Rosemary Forsyth =

Canadian actress (born 1943)

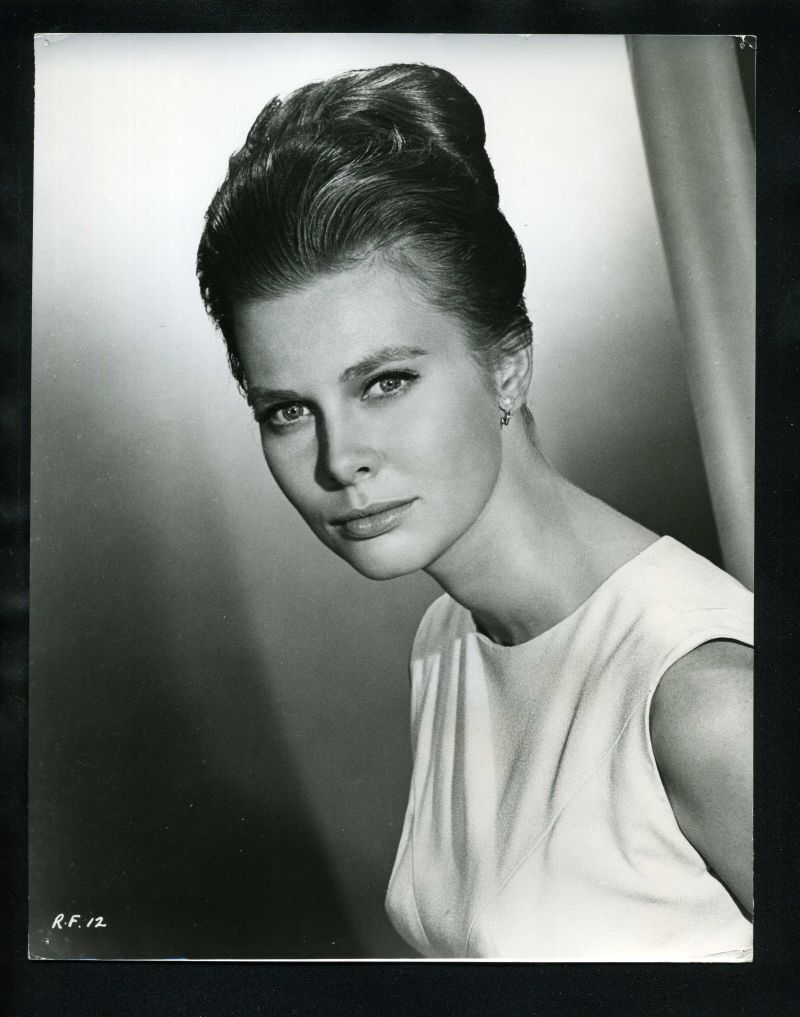
- Forsyth in 1966
- Born: July 6, 1943 (age 82); Montreal, Quebec, Canada
- Citizenship: Canada; United States
- Occupation: Actress
- Years active: 1963–2008
- Known for: Laura Horton on Days of Our Lives
- Spouse(s): Michael Tolan (1966–1970); Ron Waranch (1972–1975); Alan Skip Horwits (1980–1983); Robert Yuro (1983–2020, his death)
- Children: 1

Rosemary Forsyth (born July 6, 1943) is a Canadian-born American actress. She made her big screen debut in the 1965 Western film Shenandoah, for which she received Golden Globe Award nomination for New Star of the Year – Actress. Forsyth later starred in films The War Lord (1965), Texas Across the River (1966), Where It's At (1969), What Ever Happened to Aunt Alice? (1969), Some Kind of a Nut (1969), How Do I Love Thee? (1970), Black Eye (1974) and Gray Lady Down (1978).

Forsyth mostly acted in a made-for-television movies and series during the 1970s and 1980s. From 1976 to 1980, she played Laura Horton on the NBC soap opera, Days of Our Lives. She went on to originate the role of Sophia Wayne Capwell in another soap opera, Santa Barbara in 1984. She later returned to film, playing supporting roles in Disclosure (1994), Daylight (1996), Valerie Flake (1999) and Ghosts of Mars (2001).

== Early years ==
Forsyth was born in Montreal, Quebec. Her father, David Forsyth, was Scots-Canadian; her mother was an Irish American who worked as a model in New York using her maiden name, Rosemary Collins. Her parents separated when she was an infant, and at five years of age she and her mother moved to New York. She studied drama in high school and college and became a model as a teenager. Educated in Stockbridge, Massachusetts, she added to her acting studies by attending the Wynn Handman Drama School in New York. Before she became a model, she worked as a file clerk and a counselor at a camp.

== Career ==
Forsyth made her screen debut in 1963 on the television series Route 66 as Claire in episode No. 101, "I Wouldn't Start from Here" and also that year had a recurring role on the NBC daytime soap opera, The Doctors. In 1964 she guest starred on the crime drama series, Mr. Broadway. A caption under Forsyth's picture in 1964 Life magazine reported, "Rosemary ... was plucked out of a magazine by Universal, then sent to New York for 18 months to act in TV, summer stock, anywhere she could find seasoning jobs." Forsyth made her big screen debut in 1965 in the Western film Shenandoah from Universal Pictures as James Stewart's daughter. In 1966, Forsyth was nominated for a Golden Globe Award as New Star of the Year-Actress for her work in Shenandoah. Later that year, Forsyth starred in the epic historical film The War Lord with Charlton Heston, playing the female lead.

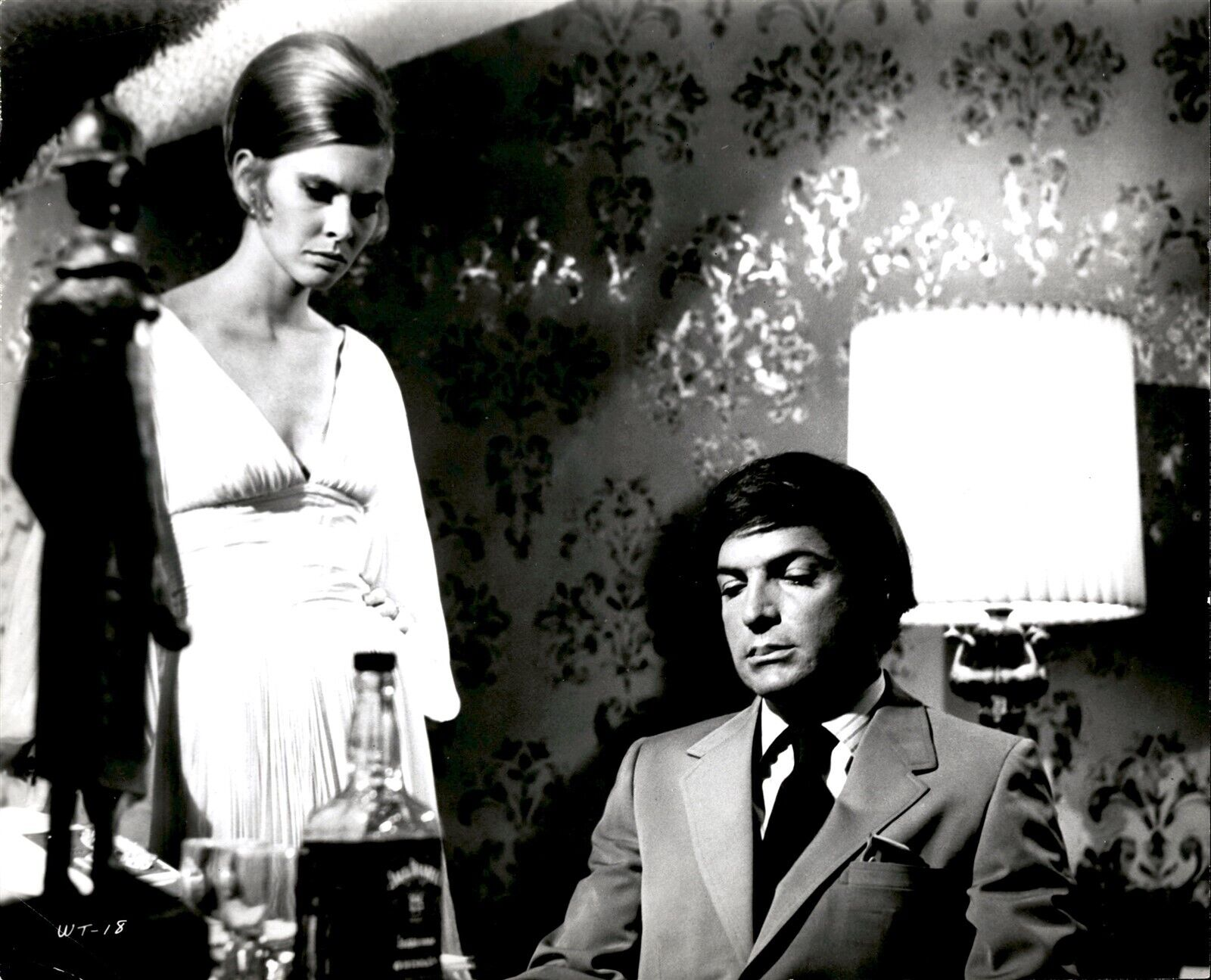
Forsyth with Robert Drivas in Where It's At (1969)

In 1966, Forsyth played the female lead in the western comedy film Texas Across the River with Dean Martin and Alain Delon. Marrying actor Michael Tolan in 1966, Forsyth took an acting break to raise their daughter. She returned to cinema in 1969, starring alongside David Janssen in the drama Where It's At for United Artists, neo-noir thriller What Ever Happened to Aunt Alice? opposite Geraldine Page, and the comedy Some Kind of a Nut alongside Dick Van Dyke and Angie Dickinson. In 1970, Forsyth starred in the box-office bomb comedy-drama film, How Do I Love Thee?. Later that year she starred alongside Glenn Ford in the made-for-television drama film, The Brotherhood of the Bell. The following year she starred in the science fiction film and television pilot City Beneath the Sea, and the spy film The Death of Me Yet. On the big screen, Forsyth made an uncredited cameo appearance in the 1973 Western comedy One Little Indian, starred opposite Fred Williamson in the neo-noir action film Black Eye (1974), and with Heston again in the disaster film Gray Lady Down (1978).

During the 1970s, Forsyth mostly acted on television. She starred in a pilot for the television series Is There a Doctor in the House?, about a young city doctor who moves to the country to work with a crusty older doctor played by William Windom, but the series was not picked up by the networks. She was featured in the 1971 Columbo television series episode titled "Murder by the Book", directed by Steven Spielberg. She made appearances on Night Gallery, Kung Fu, Mannix, Barnaby Jones, Petrocelli, Charlie's Angels and CHiPs. From August 24, 1976, to March 25, 1980, Forsyth played Laura Horton on the NBC daytime soap opera, Days of Our Lives, becoming the fourth actress to play the part. After leaving that soap, Forsyth guest-starred on The Incredible Hulk, WKRP in Cincinnati, T. J. Hooker, Fantasy Island and Magnum, P.I.. In 1984, she was cast as Sophia Wayne Capwell on the new NBC daytime soap opera, Santa Barbara. Forsyth left the series after 40 episodes on October 26, 1984. The following year she had a recurring role as Ann McFadden in the CBS prime time soap opera, Dallas. In 1986 she appeared in the made-for-television action film The Gladiator. Since then, Forsyth appeared in made-for-television movies and series, notable having guest shots on Murder, She Wrote, JAG, Star Trek: Voyager, Chicago Hope, Dharma & Greg, ER and Ally McBeal.

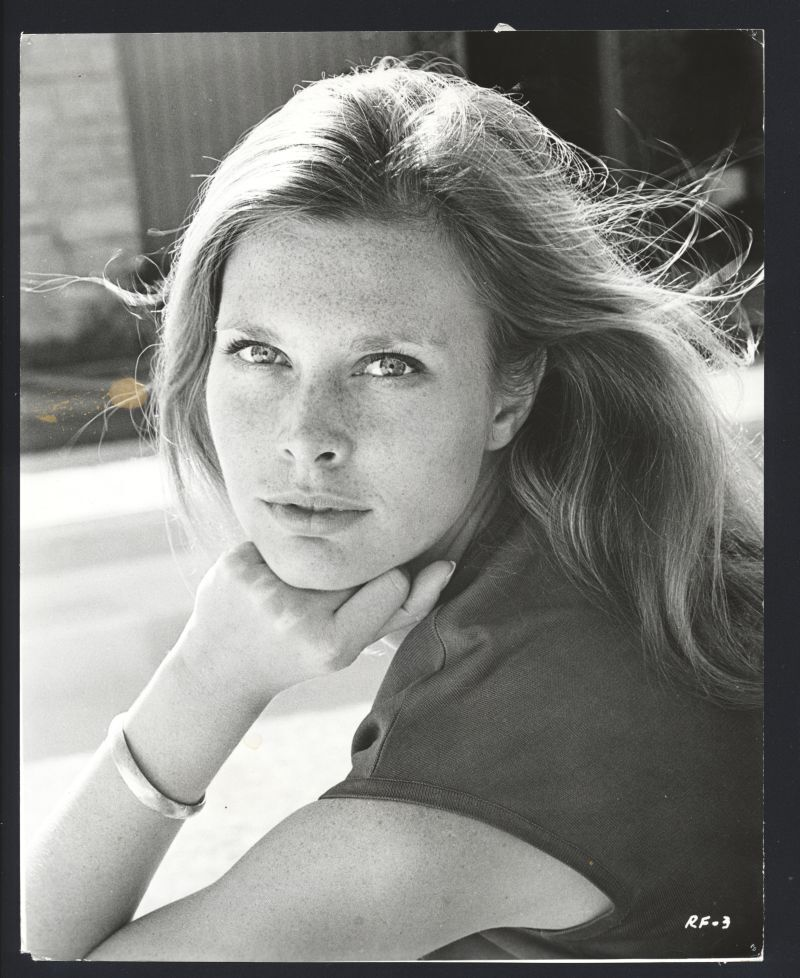
Forsyth in 1965

In 1994, after a 16-year absence, Forsyth made her return to the big screen, playing mature supporting roles in the comedy film Exit to Eden based on Anne Rice's novel of the same name, and the thriller film Disclosure starring Michael Douglas based on a novel by Michael Crichton. She played a psychologist in the 1995 drama film Melissa and played the head of a New York engineering company in the disaster film Daylight (1996). She played mother roles in the films Girl (1998) and Valerie Flake (1999). In 2001, Forsyth made her final big screen appearance in the space Western horror film, Ghosts of Mars. She has since appearanced on Boston Public, Monk, NYPD Blue and Without a Trace, as well made-for-television films A Time to Remember (2003) and Sweet Nothing in My Ear (2008). In 2003, Forsyth was elected to the Screen Actors Guild's Hollywood Division Board.

== Personal life ==
Forsyth was married to actor Michael Tolan. In 1972, she married Ron Waranch. In 1980, she married Alan Skip Horwits. In 1983 she married actor Robert Yuro, with whom she appeared in an episode of Mannix, and remained married to him until his death in 2020.

== Filmography ==
=== Film ===
Year	Title	Role	Notes
1965	Shenandoah	Jennie Anderson	
1965	The War Lord	Bronwyn	
1966	Texas Across the River	Phoebe Ann Naylor	
1969	Where It's At	Diana	
1969	What Ever Happened to Aunt Alice?	Harriet Vaughan	
1969	Some Kind of a Nut	Pamela Anders	
1970	How Do I Love Thee?	Marion Waltz	
1973	One Little Indian	Cameo	Uncredited
1974	Black Eye	Miss Francis	
1978	Gray Lady Down	Vickie Blanchard	
1994	Exit to Eden	Mrs. Brady	
1994	Disclosure	Stephanie Kaplan	
1995	Secret Sins	Dr. Gardner	
1996	Daylight	Ms. London	
1998	Girl	Mom	
1999	Valerie Flake	Irene Flake	
2001	Ghosts of Mars	Inquisitor	

=== Television ===
Year	Title	Role	Notes
1963	The Doctors	Susan Dean	Season 2 (recurring, 5 episodes)
1963	Route 66	Claire Leventhal	Season 4 (guest, 1 episode)
1964	Mr. Broadway	Pearl	Season 1 (guest, 1 episode)
1968	It Takes a Thief	Miss Harris	Season 1 (guest, 1 episode)
1970	The Brotherhood of the Bell	Vivian Masters Patterson	TV movie
1970	The Immortal	Dr. Anne Koster	Season 1 (guest, 1 episode)
1971	The Name of the Game	Jean Ulster	Season 3 (guest, 1 episode)
1971	City Beneath the Sea	Lia Holmes	TV movie
1971	Is There a Doctor in the House	Dr. Michael Griffin	TV movie
1971	Columbo	Joanna Ferris	Season 1 (guest, 1 episode)
1971	Mannix	Leslie Fielding	Season 5 (guest, 1 episode)
1971	The Death of Me Yet	Sybil Towers	TV movie
1972	Longstreet	Hannah Aalborg	Season 1 (guest, 1 episode)
1972	Night Gallery	Barbara Bennett	Season 2 (guest, 1 episode)
1972	Cade's County	Gail Hyland	Season 1 (guest, 1 episode)
1972	Assignment Vienna	Annalisa	Season 1 (guest, 1 episode)
1974	Mannix	Liz Farrell	Season 7 (guest, 1 episode)
1974	Petrocelli	Nancy Holbrook	Season 1 (guest, 1 episode)
1974	Kung Fu	Ellie Crowell	Season 3 (guest, 1 episode)
1975	My Father's House	Judith Lindholm	TV movie
1975	Barbary Coast	Laurelee Bell	Season 1 (guest, 1 episode)
1975	Barnaby Jones	Ruth Hanley	Season 4 (guest, 1 episode)
1975	Joe Forrester	(unknown role)	Season 1 (guest, 1 episode)
1975	Petrocelli	Lauren	Season 2 (guest, 1 episode)
1976	Charlie's Angels	Michelle St. Clair	Season 1 (guest, 1 episode)
1976–80	Days of Our Lives	Laura Horton	Soap opera (regular, 355 episodes)
1979	Vega$	Elizabeth	Season 2 (guest, 1 episode)
1979	CHiPs	Joan Manette	Season 3 (guest, 1 episode)
1980	Fantasy Island	Dr. Melanie Elizabeth Griffin	Season 3 (guest, 1 episode)
1974	Mannix	Carol Britton	Season 8 Episode Picture of a Shadow(guest, 1 episode)
1980	The Incredible Hulk	Ellen	Season 4 (guest, 1 episode)
1981	ABC Afterschool Special	Jean Gilbert	Season 9 (guest, 1 episode)
1981	Fantasy Island	Margo Glenn	Season 4 (guest, 1 episode)
1981	WKRP in Cincinnati	Joyce Armor	Season 4 (guest, 2 episodes)
1983	T.J. Hooker	Irene King	Season 2 (guest, 1 episode)
1983	Fantasy Island	Lily Burton	Season 6 (guest, 1 episode)
1983	Magnum, P.I.	Margaret Chase	Season 3 (guest, 1 episode)
1983	Simon & Simon	Lisa Bannon	Season 3 (guest, 1 episode)
1984	Call to Glory	Elaine Farrell	Season 1 (guest, 1 episode)
1984	Santa Barbara	Sophia Wayne Capwell	Soap opera (regular, 40 episodes)
1984	Remington Steele	Marjorie Flowers	Season 3 (guest, 1 episode)
1985	Dallas	Ann McFadden	Season 8 (guest, 3 episodes)
1985	Murder, She Wrote	Dr. Andrea Jeffreys Reed	Season 1 (guest, 1 episode)
1985	Finder of Lost Loves	Mrs. Bennetts	Season 1 (guest, 1 episode)
1985	Simon & Simon	Ellen Lottick	Season 5 (guest, 1 episode)
1986	The Gladiator	Loretta Simpson	TV movie
1987	Hunter	Dr. Paxton	Season 4 (guest, 3 episodes)
1988	Addicted to His Love	Lady in Dress Shop	TV movie
1988	A Friendship in Vienna	Inge's and Lise's Main Teacher	TV movie
1989	Mr. Belvedere	Ilsa Shoemaker	Season 5 (guest, 1 episode)
1989	Nashville Beat	Kate O'Neal	TV movie
1990	Mr. Belvedere	Louise Marie Gilbert	Season 6 (guest, 2 episode)
1991	Murder, She Wrote	Estelle Freelander	Season 8 (guest, 1 episode)
1992	General Hospital	Dr. James	Soap opera (guest, 3 episodes)
1993	A Case for Murder	Judge Helen McCoy	TV movie
1995	Abandoned and Deceived	Judge	TV movie
1995	The Other Woman	Dr. Angela Crane	TV movie
1996	JAG	Senator Grace Marion	Season 1 (guest, 1 episode)
1997–2000	Chicago Hope	Dr. Edith Strauss	Season 3, 6 (guest, 2 episodes)
1997	Orleans	Luther's Ex-wife	Season 1 (guest, 1 episode)
1997	Star Trek: Voyager	Alzen	Season 4 (guest, 1 episode)
1997–98	Dharma & Greg	Merrill	Season 1–2 (guest, 2 episodes)
1998	L.A. Doctors	Phyllis Bergold	Season 1 (guest, 1 episode)
1998	Nothing Sacred	Sister Mary Germaine	Season 1 (guest, 1 episode)
2000	Chicken Soup for the Soul	(unknown role)	Season 1 (guest, 1 episode)
2000–01	Ally McBeal	Judge Martha Graves	Season 3–4 (guest, 2 episodes)
2000	ER	Judy	Season 7 (guest, 1 episode)
2002	Without a Trace	Nancy Highsmith	Season 1 (guest, 1 episode)
2002	Providence	Elaine	Season 5 (guest, 1 episode)
2002	Boston Public	Judge Toft	Season 3 (guest, 1 episode)
2003	A Time to Remember	Dorothy Walderson	TV movie
2004	Monk	Marcia Ellison	Season 3 (guest, 1 episode)
2005	NYPD Blue	Felicia Heilbrenner	Season 12 (guest, 1 episode)
2005	Without a Trace	Martha Scoggins	Season 3 (guest, 1 episode)
2008	Sweet Nothing in My Ear	Louise Miller	TV movie

== Awards and nominations ==
Year	Award	Category	Nominated work	Result	Ref.
1966	Golden Globe Awards	Most Promising Newcomer – Actress	Shenandoah	Nominated	
1966	Laurel Awards	New Faces – Female	Shenandoah	2nd place	
1966	Photoplay Awards	Most Promising New Star (Female)	Shenandoah	Nominated	
1972	Photoplay Awards	Favorite Female Star	How Do I Love Thee?	Nominated	
