= Some Kind of a Nut =

1969 film by Garson Kanin

- Theatrical release poster by Jack Davis
- Directed by: Garson Kanin
- Screenplay by: Garson Kanin
- Produced by: Walter Mirisch
- Starring: Dick Van Dyke; Angie Dickinson; Rosemary Forsyth; Zohra Lampert; Elliott Reid; Dennis King
- Cinematography: Enrique Bravo; Burnett Guffey; Gerald Hirschfeld
- Edited by: Richard W. Farrell
- Music by: Johnny Mandel
- Production companies: DFI; The Mirisch Production Company
- Distributed by: United Artists
- Release date: October 1, 1969 (New York City)
- Running time: 90 minutes
- Country: United States
- Language: English

Some Kind of a Nut is a 1969 American comedy film written and directed by Garson Kanin and starring Dick Van Dyke, Angie Dickinson and Rosemary Forsyth.

This was the final film of Dennis King.

== Plot ==
Fred Amidon is a Manhattan bank teller whose wife Rachel is divorcing him. Fred already has a new fiancée, bank colleague Pamela Anders, with whom he is about to embark on a vacation.

While on a picnic in the park, Fred is stung on the chin by a bee. Because it hurts him to shave, Fred lets a full beard grow. He returns to work from vacation and is surprised when his boss orders him to shave. Pamela doesn't care for the beard, either, but Fred is tired of always conforming to everyone else's desires and demands. He refuses and is fired.

Colleagues come to Fred's defense. The male ones grow beards in support. Co-workers go on strike and carry picket signs outside the bank, soon joined by hippies and jazz musicians with beards. Fred becomes an overnight media sensation.

Rachel likes the new Fred's backbone and fortitude. Pamela does not. She drugs his wine and has her brothers shave him. Fred wakes up with their work half-finished. He flees on foot, wearing half a beard and nothing else but underwear and shoes. Police arrest him and place him in a psychiatric ward. Rachel rescues him, they reconcile and Fred shaves the beard, which he never intended to keep.

== Cast ==
- Dick Van Dyke as Fred Amidon
- Angie Dickinson as Rachel Amidon
- Rosemary Forsyth as Pamela Anders
- Zohra Lampert as Bunny Erickson
- Elliott Reid as Gardner Anders
- Steve Roland as Baxter Anders
- Dennis King as Otis Havemeyer
- Pippa Scott as Dr. Sara
- Heywood Hale Broun as Himself
- Peter Brocco as Mr. Suzumi
- Benny Baker as Cab Driver
- Harry Davis as Dr. Phillip D. Ball
- Roy Roberts as 1st Vice President
- Jonathan Hole as 2nd Vice President
- Robert Ito as George Toyota
- Danny Crystal as Dr. Abrams
- Lucy Saroyan as Samantha
- David Doyle as Larry, Bank Teller
- Carole Shelley as Rita, Bank Teller
- Jennifer O'Neill as the beauty (uncredited)
- Howard Hesseman as bartender (uncredited)
