= Black Eye (film) =

1974 film by Jack Arnold

- VHS cover
- Directed by: Jack Arnold
- Screenplay by: Mark Haggard; Jim Martin
- Based on: Murder on the Wild Side by Jeff Jacks
- Starring: Fred Williamson
- Cinematography: Ralph Woolsey
- Edited by: Gene Ruggiero
- Music by: Mort Garson
- Production companies: Pat Rooney Productions; Jerry Buss Presentations
- Distributed by: Warner Bros.
- Release date: May 17, 1974
- Running time: 98 minutes
- Country: United States
- Language: English

Black Eye is a 1974 American neo-noir action blaxploitation film produced by Pat Rooney, directed by Jack Arnold and starring Fred Williamson. The film was based on the 1971 novel Murder on the Wild Side by Jeff Jacks.

== Plot ==
A Los Angeles private investigator, Stone, is enlisted to investigate multiple murders that are connected to a cane that was stolen from a deceased silent movie star. Stone is drawn into intrigues involving a young woman who has run away from home to join a religious cult, and ultimately uncovers a heroin ring.

== Cast ==
- Fred Williamson as Shepherd "Shep" Stone
- Rosemary Forsyth as Miss Francis
- Teresa Graves as Cynthia
- Richard Anderson as Dole
- Richard X. Slattery as Bowen
- Larry Mann as Avery
- Brett Morrison as Majors
- Susan Arnold as Amy
- Frank Ashmore as Chess
- Theodore Wilson as Lindy
- Belinda Balaski as Mary
- Nick Ramus

== Production ==
Black Eye, originally entitled simply Stone (the protagonist's name), was conceived as “a Raymond Chandler-style detective story," and is set in Santa Monica and Venice, California. Director Jack Arnold shot the entire movie on location, none which was filmed in a studio. Arnold's “speed and efficiency” in executing the picture earned him high praise from producer Pat Rooney, who thanked Arnold publicly in a promotional advertisement in The Hollywood Reporter.

== Release ==
Black Eye was released in April 1974, and targeted exclusively toward black audiences in order to capitalize on the recent slew of “black exploitation films” such as Shaft (1971) and Super Fly (1972).

== Reception and appraisal ==
In a contemporary review for the Los Angeles Times, critic Kevin Thomas called the film a "modest, entertaining private detective caper" and wrote: "If 'Black Eye' ... lacks both originality and individuality it is nonetheless serviceable, mainly credible and not unduly violent." Thomas also praised Williamson, who "continues to impress in one of his best opportunities to date."

Biographer and film critic Dana M. Reemes registered this assessment of Black Eye:

Staging and performances are good, but the film’s major attraction is the excellent location work...The sleazy ambience of the Venice boardwalk is used to great effect, and there is a spectacular car chase over the Venice canals reputedly shot surreptitiously without police permits.

Reemes adds: “The irony is that Black Eye would have probably made more money for Warner Bros. if it had not been targeted solely at a black audience.”

== See also ==
- List of American films of 1974

== Sources ==
- Reemes, Dana M. 1988. Directed by Jack Arnold. McFarland & Company, Jefferson, North Carolina 1988. ISBN 978-0899503318
