= The War Lord =

1965 film by Franklin J. Schaffner

- Film poster by Howard Terpning
- Directed by: Franklin J. Schaffner
- Screenplay by: John Collier; Millard Kaufman
- Based on: The Lovers; 1956 play by Leslie Stevens
- Produced by: Walter Seltzer
- Starring: Charlton Heston; Richard Boone; Rosemary Forsyth; Maurice Evans; Guy Stockwell
- Cinematography: Russell Metty
- Edited by: Folmar Blangsted
- Music by: Jerome Moross; Hans J. Salter
- Color process: Technicolor
- Production company: Court Productions
- Distributed by: Universal Pictures
- Release date: November 17, 1965
- Running time: 123 minutes
- Country: United States
- Language: English
- Budget: $3,500,000

The War Lord is a 1965 American historical drama film directed by Franklin J. Schaffner and starring Charlton Heston. The film, which concerns medieval warfare and culture in 11th-century Normandy, is an adaptation of the play The Lovers by Leslie Stevens. The film also features Richard Boone, Rosemary Forsyth, Guy Stockwell, Maurice Evans, Niall MacGinnis, Henry Wilcoxon and James Farentino, with Jon Alderson, Allen Jaffe, Sammy Ross, and Woodrow Parfrey.

== Plot ==
Chrysagon de la Cruex is a Norman knight whose duke gives him a Flemish village to rule and protect, commanding him to keep their goodwill. He and his men arrive in time to beat off Frisian raiders who leave behind a boy, the son of their leader, who conceals his identity. Chrysagon encounters Bronwyn, his future love, as she is being harassed by his own men. Gradually he finds himself falling for the girl he has rescued. Odins, the village chief, later asks Chrysagon's permission for Bronwyn to marry Odins' son Marc, to whom Bronwyn has been betrothed since childhood. Chrysagon gives approval but soon regrets the decision. He now wants Bronwyn for himself.

Noticing Chrysagon's discomfort, his brother Draco has the village priest suggest he claim the pagan practice of "droit du seigneur"; though condemned by the church, it still survives. Bronwyn and Marc are married in church and also in a riotous pagan celebration. Chrysagon appears at the latter to claim the right of the lord to sleep with a virgin on her wedding night. While three men restrain Marc, Odins declares that Chrysagon has the right, but all must be done according to the ancient ways, which are rooted in the sacrifice of a virgin to ensure fruitful harvests. Otherwise, it is rape. Chrysagon agrees to the Druid way, to prepare a ring of fire in a high place, with his men “wearing iron and standing.” Chrysagon says that he has a high place, referring to the stone tower he commands. Bronwyn will be brought at the rising of the moon and reclaimed at sunrise.

Odins leads the torchlit procession past Chrysagon's men standing as an armed guard, to the chamber at the top of the keep. He tells her she can go but confesses his love for her. She loves him too. Outside, Odins comforts his son Marc, telling him that he will soon have Bronwyn back.

Bronwyn and Chrysagon watch the sunrise. He puts his father's ring on her finger and later tells his outraged brother he will not give her up.

Marc admits that Chrysagon had the right but he and the villagers are outraged when Bronwyn is not returned. They do not realize that she is staying of her own free will.

The village sends Marc to contact the Frisians, with evidence that the boy is alive. When Bronwyn and Chrysagon are on top of the keep, he talks of carrying her to a far place, after his duty to his Duke is done. They see the Frisians hacking at the drawbridge and sound the alarm. Chrysagon climbs down to attack them, wearing only his braies.

The raiders lay siege to the place, with nearly all the village now with them. They call for the return of the boy prince, but Draco demands ransom. Later he leaves, alone, perhaps for help. Chrysagon tells his men his brother is riding for help from the Duke in Ghent.

The besiegers bring up a battering ram. Lacking a grappling hook, Bors slides down to retrieve the anchor of a boat sunk in the moat. They use it to overturn the battering ram into the moat. That night, sheltering behind hurdles, the Frisians set fire to the entry door. The defenders pour boiling oil down on them, which also burns up the drawbridge.

The Friesians and villagers build a siege tower, with a bridge that will carry them to the top of the keep. Suddenly, boulders and balls of fire crash into the siege tower. It is Draco, come with help from the Duke, including a catapult. He has also been given the demesne. Later, when they argue inside the tower, he attacks Chrysagon, who stabs him unwillingly in the struggle. Draco falls to his death down the stairwell.

Chrysagon takes the boy to the Frisian camp. The Frisian prince offers him a place with them, and sanctuary for Bronwyn, who Chrysagon calls “my lady”. Chrysagon plans to go to the Duke and mend things for the people of the village. When Marc jumps from a high tree wielding a sickle, wounding Chrysagon under his arm and running to attack Bronwyn, he is collared by Bors on horseback and impaled on a jagged tree branch. Chrysagon confers the fief to one of his men, until he returns. Bors and Chrysagon, clutching his wounded side, ride off.

== Cast ==
- Charlton Heston as Chrysagon
- Rosemary Forsyth as Bronwyn
- Richard Boone as Bors
- Guy Stockwell as Draco
- Maurice Evans as the priest
- James Farentino as Marc
- Niall MacGinnis as Odins, Marc's father
- Henry Wilcoxon as Frisian Prince
- Johnny Jensen as the Boy Prince
- Sammy Ross as Volc, the Falcon Master
- Michael Conrad as Rainault

== Soundtrack ==
The film's score was composed by Jerome Moross. The main musical theme was released as a guitar instrumental by The Shadows. A soundtrack album was released by Decca Records in 1965.

== Reception ==
On Rotten Tomatoes the film has an approval rating of 67% based on reviews from 9 critics.

Critics largely lauded its "gritty" realistic portrayal of the times, both in physical aspects, such as armor and weapons, structures and scenes, but also in its portrayal of social circumstances and behaviors of Medieval lords and serfs.

Medieval historian Andrew E. Larsen praises the movie's realistic portrayal of the physical objects and social relationships of the time. But he asserts the film's presentation of paganism among the serfs is an extreme exaggeration, and that the key "custom" of "droit du seigneur" was mythical. He criticizes the film's romanticizing of "what is, essentially, rape," adding that—while such rapes have happened, at the time—they lacked any legal standing.

== See also ==
- List of American films of 1965
- Middle Ages in film
