= Michael Gordon (film director) =

American theater and film director

- Gordon in 1949
- Born: Irving Kunin Gordon; September 6, 1909; Baltimore, Maryland, U.S.
- Died: April 29, 1993 (aged 83); Century City, Los Angeles, California, U.S.
- Spouse: Elizabeth Cohn
- Relatives: Joseph Gordon-Levitt (grandson)

Michael Gordon (born Irving Kunin Gordon; September 6, 1909 – April 29, 1993) was an American stage actor and stage and film director.

== Life and career ==
Gordon was born in Baltimore, Maryland, to Jewish parents: Paul Luis Gordon (1876–1957), who was born in Lithuania, and Eva "Rachel" Kuhen (1885–1940), who was born in Russia. Michael was the second of three boys born to the Gordon family; first born was Bertram Ira Gordon (1914–1985), who was a lieutenant in the U.S. Navy, and the third born was Leo Allenby Gordon (1919–2005).

Michael Gordon was a member of the Group Theatre (1935–1940), and was blacklisted as a Communist in the McCarthy era. He later joined the faculty of the UCLA Theater Department. Gordon summered at Pine Brook Country Club in Nichols, Connecticut. Pinebrook is best known for becoming the summer home of the Group Theatre.

As a result of being blacklisted, Gordon's Hollywood career fell into two phases. In 1940, he started as a dialogue director and directed B-movies. In the late 1940s, he distinguished himself by directing action movies, melodramas, and films noir. He also directed the 1950 film Cyrano de Bergerac, for which José Ferrer won a Best Actor Academy Award.

After being blacklisted, he was forced to stop directing films temporarily, but was called back to Hollywood at the end of the 1950s by producer Ross Hunter, who wanted him to direct Pillow Talk, a vehicle for Doris Day and Rock Hudson. Gordon's second creative phase was concerned with light-hearted, comedy films.

Gordon and his wife Elizabeth Cohn had three children: Jonathan, Jane (mother of actor Joseph Gordon-Levitt), and Susannah.

== Filmography ==
(Per AFI database)

- Boston Blackie Goes Hollywood (1942)
- Underground Agent (1942)
- Crime Doctor (1943)
- One Dangerous Night (1943)
- Crime Doctor (1943)
- The Web (1947)
- Another Part of the Forest (1948)
- An Act of Murder (1948)
- The Lady Gambles (1949)
- Once More, My Darling (1949)
- Woman in Hiding (1949)
- Cyrano de Bergerac (1950)
- I Can Get It for You Wholesale (1951)
- The Secret of Convict Lake (1951)
- Pillow Talk (1959)
- Portrait in Black (1960)
- Boys' Night Out (1962)
- Move Over, Darling (1963)
- For Love or Money (1963)
- A Very Special Favor (1965)
- Texas Across the River (1966)
- The Impossible Years (1968)
- How Do I Love Thee? (1970)
