= Las Vegas Bloodbath =

1989 American film by David Schwartz

- VHS released by Burning Moon Home Video
- Directed by: David M. Schwartz
- Written by: David M. Schwartz
- Produced by: David M. Schwartz
- Starring: Ari Levin
- Cinematography: Daryll Kilby
- Edited by: Lisa D. Coatney
- Music by: Chris Crump
- Production company: Schwartz Kilby Mayhugh Dalton Productions
- Distributed by: Burning Moon Home Video
- Release date: 1989 (United States)
- Running time: 78 minutes
- Country: United States
- Language: English

Las Vegas Bloodbath is a 1989 American slasher film written and directed by David M. Schwartz.

== Plot ==
After a successful business deal in Sacramento, Sam Butler returns to his Las Vegas home, and stumbles onto his pregnant wife, Ruth, in bed with a sheriff's deputy. Whipped into a homicidal rage, Sam grabs the deputy's discarded gun, and uses it to shoot him and Ruth. After cutting Ruth's head off, Sam leaves the house with it, and picks up a prostitute named Tina. Taking Tina to the back of a motel, Sam ties her up and stabs her in the jaw, then rips one of her legs off by attaching it to the back of his car.

Sam proceeds to shoot a bartender in the head, and follow a car advertising the Beautiful Lady Oil Wrestlers to an apartment complex, where he uses a shovel to crush the head of a gardener. Inside the apartment, the oil wrestlers are holding a baby shower for one of their members, Barbara, who is the first to be killed when Sam breaks in, having her unborn child cut out after Sam unsuccessfully attempts to rape her. Sam goes on to murder the other five wrestlers (as well as a man who tries to come to their aid) with various weapons, including a knife, a drill, a hammer, a gun, and his bare hands, topping the massacre off by beheading a visiting Jehovah's Witness.

Hours later, a police officer arrives, and finds Sam bathing in blood and body parts. Sam shoots the officer, and glares at the camera as the song "Las Vegas Blood Bath" plays.

== Cast ==
- Ari Levin as Sam Butler
- Rebecca Gandara as Wet & Wild Wendy
- Barbara Bell as Barbara
- Susanne Cidio as Suzanne
- Tiffany Heisler as Tiffany
- Leah Luchette as Bambi
- Jennifer Quinn as Cherry Blossom
- Elizabeth Anderson as Ruth Butler
- Tina Prunty as Tina

== Reception ==
Horror News had an indifferent response to the film, writing, "Las Vegas Bloodbath is one part S.O.V. and two parts P.O.S., with a handful of decent special effects and a surprisingly interesting ending thrown in for good measure" before concluding, "If this movie had been cut in half and made as a shot-on-video short, with all the filler scenes cut out and more time spent on the actors getting their lines down, I think we'd all be singing a different tune. The gore was there, as was the all-important desire and excitement to make a genre film. Unfortunately, as it stands, Las Vegas Bloodbath is a missed opportunity that feels like it goes on way too long". In a review written for Something Awful, Evan Wade awarded the film a score of -40 out of -50, and wrote, "It saddens me to say that the rest of Las Vegas Blood Bath fails to live up to the makeshift abortion scene. It's like crawling through a hallway covered in rat traps, nailing a supermodel halfway through, and then realizing the remainder of the path is covered in dirty diapers and rusty thumbtacks". Retro Slashers called Las Vegas Bloodbath an "endurance test for even the most seasoned gorehounds" that was nevertheless still somewhat watchable "shlock" due to its audaciousness.

== See also ==
- List of films set in Las Vegas
