= Atomic Liquors =

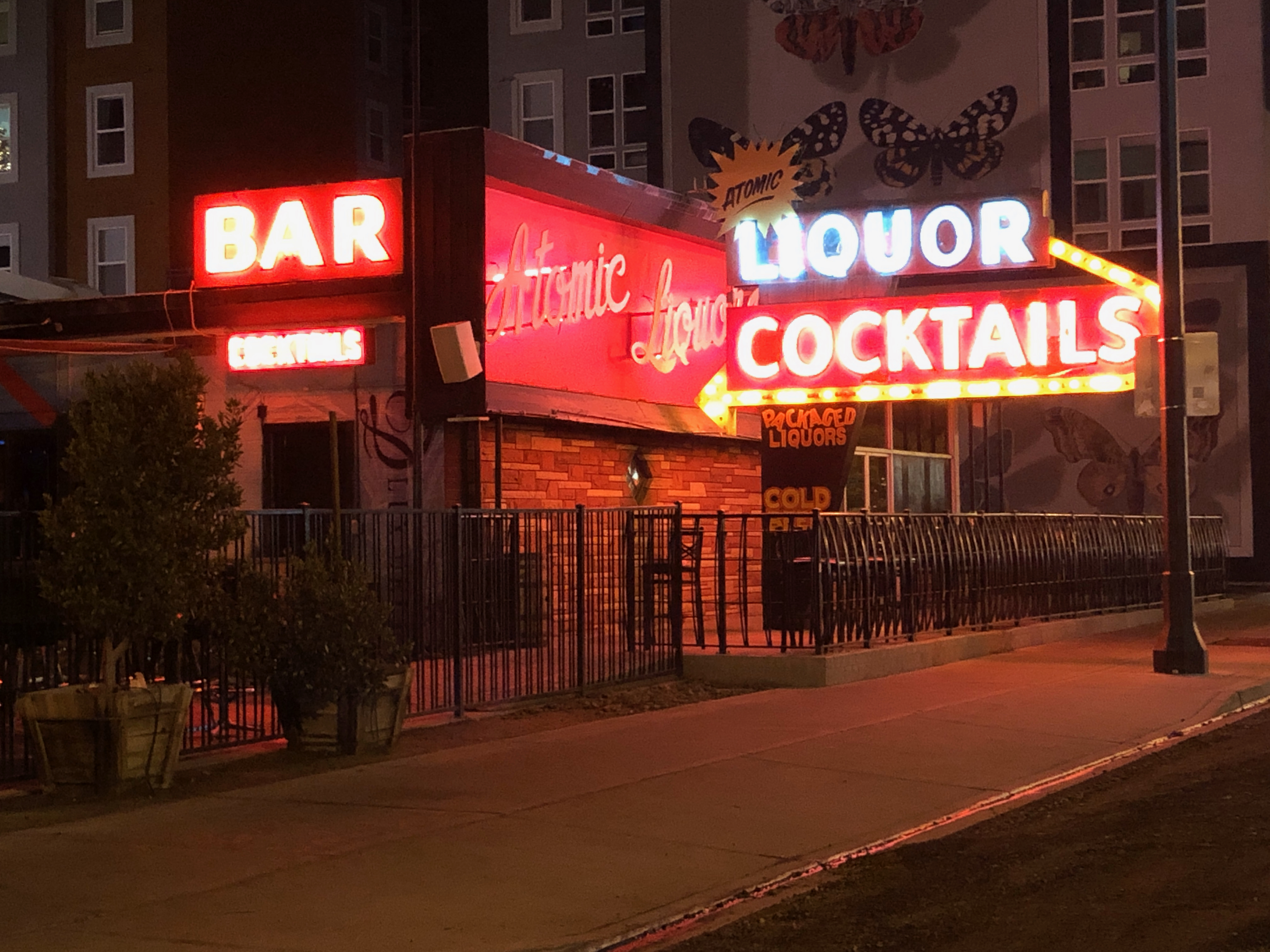
- Atomic Liquors in 2019
- Interactive map of Atomic Liquors
- Former names: Virginia's Café
- Address: 917 E Fremont Street; Las Vegas, Nevada; United States
- Location: Downtown Las Vegas
- Coordinates: 36.1668°N 115.1354°W
- Owner: Kent Johns, Lance Johns, Derek Stoneberger
- Type: Bar & Restaurant

Construction
- Opened: 1954
- Renovated: 2012

Website
- atomic.vegas

Atomic Liquors is a bar in Las Vegas, Nevada, opened April 17, 1954. In the popular culture, Atomic Liquors is the "oldest freestanding bar in Las Vegas," with its established date erroneously stated as 1952, and is said to be "the first business in Las Vegas to be given a tavern license to sell liquor and operate an onsite bar."

== History ==
Virginia Barrett inherited the property from Las Vegas pioneer Richard Busteed, her former employer. In 1945, Virginia and husband Jack Barrett, along with Virginia's daughter Stella and husband Joe Sobchick, opened Virginia's Café on this property. Virginia Barrett was the sole licensee of Virginia’s Cafe. In 1954, Virginia's Cafe was replaced with newly built and newly licensed Atomic Liquors, originally licensed to the Barretts.

The Sobchicks operated the bar until they died in 2010. Their son, Ron Sobchick, operated the bar. In 2011, the bar closed. In 2012, it was purchased by brothers Kent Johns, a commercial real estate broker, and Lance Johns, an attorney, and Derek Stoneberger.

In popular media, famous people who are said to have visited the bar include Bugsy Siegel despite the fact that Siegel was killed seven years before the bar opened, along with other such claims. A bar stool with a star on it sits at the end of the inside bar, the preferred seat of Barbra Streisand when "she visited regularly." Atomic Liquors has appeared in The Hangover, Casino, and The Twilight Zone. Anthony Bourdain filmed a segment of his show Parts Unknown at the bar in 2013.

== In popular culture ==
The Atomic Wrangler, a bar and casino in the 2010 video game Fallout: New Vegas is inspired by Atomic Liquors.
