= Big Helium Dog =

- Directed by: Brian Lynch
- Written by: Brian Lynch
- Produced by: View Askew
- Starring: Matt Kawczynski; Michael Linstroth
- Edited by: Brian Lynch
- Release date: 1999
- Running time: 89 minutes
- Language: English

Big Helium Dog is a 1999 comedy film. It is produced by Kevin Smith's View Askew production company and also features members of the Broken Lizard comedy troupe in starring (Kevin Heffernan) and supporting (Jay Chandrasekhar, Steve Lemme, and Erik Stolhanske) roles.

== Story description ==
A sketch comedy which spoofs its own production: A guy trying to cope with losing his friend is pulled against his will into a lucrative TV deal that later falls through, nonetheless he saves the world from destruction.

== Cast ==
- Matt Kawczynski as Charlie Osgood
- Michael Linstroth as Ray Cross
- Kevin Smith as Director
- Kevin Heffernan as Phil
- Michael Ian Black as Martin Huber
- Lorene Scafaria as Chastity
- Pete Capella as High School Jock
- Jay Chandrasekhar as Movie Producer (scenes deleted)
- Damien Furey as Autograph Seeker
- Ralph Lambiase as BHD Interviewer
- Alyce LaTourelle as Law Bitch
- Dicky Barrett as Mr. Blocko
- Steve Lemme as Kendrick
- Brian Lynch as Director's Assistant
- Vincent Pereira as Cigarette Fairy
- Richard Perello as Bartender
- Brian Quinn as Vance
- Blanchard Ryan as Beautiful Dancer
- Erik Stolhanske as Father Joeb
- Bryan W. Strang as Carl Dunlop
- Kelli Strang as Little Susie
- Kris VanCleave as Immense Gay Trucker
- Bryan Johnson as Undercover Jesus
- Ming Chen as Club Patron
- Gary Dell'Abate as Trevor Lehigh

== See also ==
- List of American films of 1999
