= Quasi (film) =

2023 film by Kevin Heffernan

- Official release poster
- Directed by: Kevin Heffernan
- Written by: Kevin Heffernan; Steve Lemme; Jay Chandrasekhar; Paul Soter; Erik Stolhanske
- Based on: The Hunchback of Notre-Dame by Victor Hugo
- Produced by: Richard Perello
- Starring: Jay Chandrasekhar; Kevin Heffernan; Steve Lemme; Paul Soter; Erik Stolhanske; Adrianne Palicki
- Cinematography: Joe Collins
- Edited by: Frank McGrath
- Music by: Jason Akans
- Production companies: Cataland Films; Broken Lizard Industries
- Distributed by: Searchlight Pictures
- Release date: April 20, 2023
- Running time: 99 minutes
- Country: United States
- Language: English

Quasi is a 2023 American satirical comedy film directed by Kevin Heffernan and written by Heffernan and Broken Lizard members Steve Lemme, Jay Chandrasekhar, Paul Soter, and Erik Stolhanske. The film takes a satirical take on Victor Hugo's 1831 novel The Hunchback of Notre-Dame. It was released by Searchlight Pictures as a Hulu original film on April 20, 2023.

== Plot ==
In medieval France, Quasi Modo, a hunchback, works as a torturer along with his co-worker and "hut mate" Duchamp; they torture culinary student Michel. Meanwhile, the sinister King Guy is set to marry Queen Catherine in a planned ceremony to unite their kingdoms during Pope Week, which is to be attended by Pope Cornelius, with whom King Guy has a bitter rivalry. During Pope Week, a papal drawing is held, with the winner getting a chance to meet the pope in person. Out of sympathy, Duchamp gives Quasi a ticket so that he can participate. It happens to be the winning ticket, causing Quasi to suddenly become popular and Duchamp visibly becoming jealous.

Catherine takes an interest in Quasi when he leads his coworkers in a brief rebellion against their boss Lucien, and sees potential in him. Later, Quasi is invited to eat with King Guy, who asks him to assassinate Cornelius, much to his shock. He tells Duchamp and Michel, and declares that he must go through with it or else he will be killed. When it is time kill Cornelius, the Pope orders him to kill King Guy during the union ceremony. When King Guy sees that Quasi has not killed Cornelius he threatens him, but then decides to also have the assassination done during the ceremony. He tells his assistant Henri that he plans to kill Quasi afterwards, news that is heard by Catherine.

When he is approached by Catherine, who tells him what she heard, Quasi becomes depressed. They concoct a plan, which Quasi then tells Duchamp about. During the ceremony, Quasi appears to attack both King Guy and Cornelius, but Duchamp "kills" Quasi and becomes a hero. Quasi is whisked away to a cave, where Duchamp promises to look out for him. When Duchamp returns to the kingdom, his heroic deed is forgotten, but everyone is saddened over Quasi's death. Catherine comes to visit Quasi and when Duchamp sees the two of them getting along, he leaves heartbroken. Duchamp gets drunk and tells Lucien that Quasi is still alive, and then Lucien tells Henri, who comes and captures Quasi to have him tortured.

Catherine sneaks into the dungeon and kills Lucien before freeing Quasi. The two of them learn that they are both of royal blood and are cousins, news that excites them into having sex. Quasi escapes and seeks out Duchamp, who confesses to betraying him. Quasi escapes the guards, while Duchamp is captured and ordered to be publicly executed. Quasi plans to leave town, but Michel manages to convince him to return and rescue Duchamp. They arrive at the execution, where Quasi discloses that King Guy and Pope Cornelius had ordered each other's deaths, and Catherine reveals that Quasi is of royal blood. A fight breaks out resulting in the deaths of Henri, Cornelius' assistant Claude, and Michel, who in his dying breath asks Quasi and Duchamp to remain friends.

The people of France soon rally behind Quasi, not because of his royal lineage, but because they relate to him. King Guy and Cornelius both fatally stab one another and in their dying moments reveal that they were once lovers at university and broke up due to each of them cheating on the other, with the same man. They die admitting that they still love each other. Quasi renews his friendship with Duchamp, and he and Catherine admit their love for each other, and become the new rulers of France. During the credits, Quasi and Duchamp hold a funeral for Michel, who asked that he have a proper burial so that animals do not eat him. However, they have trouble fitting him in the grave due to his height, the result of being repeatedly stretched on the rack. In a post-credits scene, Michel's hands get eaten by dogs.

== Cast ==
- Jay Chandrasekhar as:
  - King Guy, the sadistic and foppish king of France.
  - Blouin, the owner of the pub that Quasi and his friends visit.
- Kevin Heffernan as:
  - Duchamp Rousseau, Quasi's optimistic, but later jealous, hut mate.
  - Henri-Francoise, King Guy's personal aid.
- Steve Lemme as:
  - Quasi Modo, a hunchback who is tasked with an assassination.
  - Jester, the King's fool who is constantly punished.
- Paul Soter as:
  - Pope Cornelius, the Pope who wants power.
  - Lucien, Quasi and Duchamp's mean and cynical boss.
- Erik Stolhanske as:
  - Cardinal Claude, Pope Cornelius' personal aid.
  - Michel Demek, a culinary student and Quasi and Duchamp's friend.
- Adrianne Palicki as Queen Catherine, the smart and seductive queen of France.
- Eugene Cordero as Pascal, Quasi and Duchamp's co-worker.
- Marcus Henderson as Stefan, Quasi and Duchamp's co-worker.
- Gabriel Hogan as Jonathan, King Guy's guard.
- Gabby Lane as Emmanuel.
- Hassie Harrison as Margot.
- Brian Cox as Narrator.

== Production ==
On November 3, 2021, Broken Lizard announced a new film titled Quasi, which would be a co-production with Searchlight Pictures. The film would be a satirical take on by Victor Hugo's novel The Hunchback of Notre-Dame, with Kevin Heffernan directing the film and starring with Broken Lizard members Steve Lemme, Jay Chandrasekhar, Paul Soter, and Erik Stolhanske. Adrianne Palicki would also star in the film. While working on Super Troopers 3, the troupe showed the script to Searchlight, with the film being greenlit.

At the film's announcement, production had started in Los Angeles. By April 20, 2022, filming had wrapped up. Filming also took place in Santa Clarita.

== Release ==
Quasi was released by Searchlight Pictures on Hulu in the United States on April 20, 2023. It will also be released on Disney+ via the Star content hub internationally and Star+ in Latin America.

== Reception ==
On the review aggregator website Rotten Tomatoes, 41% of 32 critics' reviews are positive, with an average rating of 4.6/10. Metacritic, which uses a weighted average, assigned the film a score of 51 out of 100, based on eight critics, indicating "mixed or average" reviews.
