= Club Dread =

2004 film by Jay Chandrasekhar

- Theatrical release poster
- Directed by: Jay Chandrasekhar
- Written by: Broken Lizard
- Produced by: Richard Perello; Arturo Brito
- Starring: Jay Chandrasekhar; Kevin Heffernan; Steve Lemme; Paul Soter; Erik Stolhanske; Brittany Daniel; Jordan Ladd; Lindsay Price; M. C. Gainey; Bill Paxton
- Cinematography: Lawrence Sher
- Edited by: Ryan Folsey
- Music by: Nathan Barr
- Production companies: Broken Lizard Industries; Cataland Films
- Distributed by: Fox Searchlight Pictures
- Release date: February 27, 2004 (United States)
- Running time: 103 minutes
- Countries: United States; Mexico
- Language: English
- Budget: $8.6 million
- Box office: $7.5 million

Club Dread (also known as Broken Lizard's Club Dread) is a 2004 comedy slasher film directed by Jay Chandrasekhar and written by and starring the comedy troupe Broken Lizard, Chandrasekhar, Kevin Heffernan, Steve Lemme, Paul Soter, and Erik Stolhanske, along with Brittany Daniel, Jordan Ladd, Lindsay Price, M. C. Gainey, and Bill Paxton. The film follows a group of staff members (Chandrasekhar, Heffernan, Lemme, Soter, Stolhanske, Daniel, and Stone) on Pleasure Island, a hedonistic tropical island resort in Costa Rica, owned by washed up musician Peter "Coconut Pete" Wabash (Paxton), where a masked machete wielding figure begins targeting the staff and goes on a killing spree. As they wait for help from the mainland to arrive, the staff, with the help of Coconut Pete's bodyguard Hank (Gainey), band together to protect the guests, including Penelope (Ladd), uncover the identity of the killer, and end their violent rampage.

Club Dread was theatrically released in the United States on February 27, 2004, to mixed reviews from critics and was a box office failure, grossing $7.5 million against its $8.6 million production budget.

== Plot ==
Pleasure Island is a resort off the coast of Costa Rica, owned by famous, washed-up musician Coconut Pete. Staff members Rolo, Stacy, and Kelly sneak into the jungle to have sex, where they are ambushed and murdered by a masked figure. Meanwhile, Lars, the new fill-in masseur, arrives at the resort.

The resort staff discover another body behind the kitchen, and Dave relates a story about a former employee named Phil Colletti who lost his mind and murdered his fellow staff members, before castrating himself and running away. Putman alerts the others when he finds Cliff murdered in a hedge maze. A message left by the killer suggests that he is targeting only the staff. It later comes out that notes being left by the killer relate to Coconut Pete's songs. All communication devices and transportation have been stolen or destroyed while the staff tries to keep the guests from being panicked.

Hank, a former FBI serial killing investigator, convinces the staff to continue with their jobs and allow him to catch the killer. Two staff members decide to warn the guests and they (alongside Hank) are soon found dead by the hands of the killer.

The staff begins to suspect one of the guests, Penelope. Juan, believing her innocent, tries to eliminate her as a suspect. Putman disappears into the jungle after having a nightmare. Sam and Dave find a shrine of photos of Lars and his friends, in which all of the faces except Lars' have been replaced with Pete's; suspicion turns on Lars and the staff lock Lars in the resort's drunk tank. The killer attempts to kill Jenny by dropping a television into the swimming pool, but Jenny escapes just in time, ultimately killing Dirk and causing a power failure. Putman returns, and he and Jenny deduce that Lars is not the killer, and return to the drunk tank to release him, only to find that he has escaped.

When Pete is found dead, the staff members turn on each other. Partway through the argument, Lars returns and discovers Pete's body. Just as everything escalates, Jenny calms everyone else down and tries to convince the group that they must work together to survive until the shuttle from the mainland returns for the guests. The staff split up and Dave restores the electricity, seconds before being beheaded by the killer. Jenny and Lars find Dave's severed head and, thinking the killer is coming for them, hide under a bed. Jenny places a nearby pair of handcuffs on what she believed to be the killer's feet, only to realize that she handcuffed Putman by mistake. Just as Jenny and Lars come out of hiding, the killer appears and Putman tells them to hide before being killed.

During a party in the nightclub, the killer then reveals the corpses of his previous victims to the guests, causing a panic. Juan returns to join Lars and Jenny, with the killer's machete in his hand. Penelope, Juan, Lars and Jenny find Sam's body in a mud bath. While they consider their next move, Sam leaps from the bath and snatches his machete from Lars, revealing himself as the killer. He grabs Lars before revealing his motive: Pete had intended to sell the island, but ultimately decided to give the island to Dave, who Sam assumed would mismanage the resort and destroy it, instead of him. Lars grabs the machete, allowing the others to escape. Jenny and Juan lock themselves in the nightclub. They see Sam drowning Penelope in a large tank. Juan smashes the tank and rescues Penelope. Sam prepares to kill them, but Lars appears and stabs Sam.

Sam pursues the four as they escape through the jungle. Cornered on a cliff, they jump to the water below. They find the resort's damaged boats, and try to cobble together enough working parts to leave the island. Sam appears and kills Juan, then attacks Jenny and Penelope. Lars breaks his vow of pacifism and overcomes Sam, and Sam is bisected by a rope attached to the power boat. Just as everything seems to settle down, Sam's upper half emerges and grabs Penelope, but Lars tosses him into the ocean, before they motor away. As they do so, Sam's lower half continues to pursue them.

== Cast ==
Pleasure Island staff (Note: The end credits only list the characters' first names.)

- Brittany Daniel as Jenny, the aerobics instructor on Pleasure Island and Lars' love interest
- Kevin Heffernan as Lars Bronkhorst, a Swedish–American buddhist, pacifist, and the recently hired Masseur on Pleasure Island
- Erik Stolhanske as Sam, the aptly named "Fun Police", in charge of games and activities on Pleasure Island
- Steve Lemme as Juan Castillo, a Nicaraguan staff member and water sports instructor on Pleasure Island
- Jay Chandrasekhar as Putman Livingston, a British staff member and tennis instructor on Pleasure Island
- Paul Soter as David "DJ Dave/DJ Drugs" Conable, a staff member and the disk jockey for the nightclub on Pleasure island, and Coconut Pete's nephew
- Bill Paxton as Peter "Coconut Pete" Wabash, a washed up musician, owner of Pleasure Island, and Dave's uncle
- M. C. Gainey as Hank, a former director of the FBI Homicide Department and Coconut Pete's bodyguard and best friend
- Lindsay Price as Yu, a Japanese–American staff member and waitress on Pleasure Island
- Julio Bekhor as Carlos, the groundskeeper on Pleasure Island
- Dan Montgomery Jr. as Rolo, a polygamist and staff member on Pleasure Island
- Elena Lyons as Stacy, an assistant to Putman on Pleasure Island and one of Rolo's lovers
- Tanja Reichert as Kellie, an understudy to Yu, waitress on Pleasure Island, and one of Rolo's lovers
- Richard Perello as Cliff, a menial worker on Pleasure Island
- Ryan Falkner as Marcel, one of the officials on Pleasure Island

Other characters

- Greg Cipes as Trevor, Pleasure Island guest
- Michael Weaver as Roy, Pleasure Island guest and Manny's best friend
- Nat Faxon as Manny, Pleasure Island guest and Roy's best friend
- Jordan Ladd as Penelope, an Alaskan gymnast, Pleasure Island guest, and Juan's love interest
- Samm Levine as Dirk, Pleasure Island guest
- Paco Mauri as Mainland detective
- Tony Amendola as Mainland detective's partner

== Production ==
After their previous project, Super Troopers, had a roughly $3 million budget, Broken Lizard had a $8.5 million budget to work with on Club Dread, secured via Broken Lizard Industry, Cataland Films, Baja Studios, and distributed by 20th Century Fox's Searchlight Pictures. The script was written by Broken Lizard collectively and was directed by Jay Chandrasekar, his third directorial project. While on the set of a previous project, Chandrasekar was referred to cinematographer Lawrence Sher by a makeup artist who had worked with both men before; the two met and got along, leading to Broken lizard hiring Sher to be the cinematographer for Club Dread. Sher, while not an official member of Broken Lizard, would shoot other projects with the group, including The Dukes Of Hazzard just a year later.

The film was shot in Mexico, portraying the film's setting of a private island off the coast of Costa Rica. Most of footage was captured in Jalisco, Mexico, and the resort scenes were shot at Hotel Cabo Blanco. While having a significantly bigger budget than their previous films, Broken Lizard still opted to take on extra on-set responsibilities, including stunts. other actors would also go beyond the screen to help with the project, such as Bill Paxton writing and performing all of the songs of his character, Coconut Pete.

== Soundtrack ==
In 2017, Enjoy The Ride Records released "Coconut Pete - Take Another Hit"

== Track listing ==
| No. | Title | Length |
|---|---|---|
| 1. | "Pina Coladaburg" | 2:07 |
| 2. | "Pleasure Island" | 2:53 |
| 3. | "Ponytails Cocktails (live)" | 1:19 |
| 4. | "She's A Comin', She's A Blowin'" | 3:12 |
| 5. | "Naughty Cal" | 3:19 |

In an interview, Bill Paxton, who had read biographies about Jimmy Buffett prior to filming, took it upon himself to ask the filmmakers to screen the film to Buffett, who was so amused that he requested permission to sing some of the film's songs on one of his live tours.

== Critical reception ==
On the review aggregator website Rotten Tomatoes, 30% of 100 critics' reviews are positive, with an average rating of 4.4/10. The website's consensus reads: "Comedy is too hit-or-miss in this slasher spoof.". Metacritic, which uses a weighted average, assigned the film a score of 45 out of 100, based on 28 critics, indicating "mixed or average" reviews.

Dave Kehr of The New York Times wrote that "From Broken Lizard, the comedy troupe that delivered the low-budget sleeper Super Troopers in 2001, Club Dread is a disappointingly routine horror movie spoof that follows the well-worn path of the Scream and Scary Movie franchises".

Critic Roger Ebert gave the film a rating of two-and-a-half out of 4 stars and wrote that "Whether it works or not is a little hard to say; like "Super Troopers" (2001), the previous film by the Broken Lizard comedy troupe, it has lovable performances, very big laughs, and then some down time while everybody (in the cast as well as the audience) waits to see what willhappen [sic] next".

== Alternate version ==
On September 28, 2004, an unrated edition was released to DVD. This version of the film contains an additional 14 minutes of footage for a 118-minute running time. It features several extended scenes, and also restores a subplot involving two cops that was absent in the theatrical edition. Director Jay Chandrasekhar states in one of the disc's commentary tracks that the original R-rated version is still the director's cut.
