= The Dukes of Hazzard (film) =

2005 film by Jay Chandrasekhar

- Theatrical release poster
- Directed by: Jay Chandrasekhar
- Screenplay by: John O'Brien
- Story by: John O'Brien; Jonathan L. Davis
- Based on: Characters by Gy Waldron
- Produced by: Bill Gerber
- Starring: Johnny Knoxville; Seann William Scott; Jessica Simpson; Burt Reynolds; Joe Don Baker; Lynda Carter; Willie Nelson
- Cinematography: Lawrence Sher
- Edited by: Lee Haxall; Myron Kerstein
- Music by: Nathan Barr
- Production companies: Village Roadshow Pictures; Gerber Pictures; Broken Lizard
- Distributed by: Warner Bros. Pictures
- Release date: August 5, 2005
- Running time: 104 minutes
- Country: United States
- Language: English
- Budget: $53 million
- Box office: $109.8 million

The Dukes of Hazzard is a 2005 American action comedy film loosely based on the television series of the same name. It is the third Dukes of Hazzard film. It was directed by Jay Chandrasekhar and stars Johnny Knoxville, Seann William Scott, Jessica Simpson in her feature film debut, Burt Reynolds, Joe Don Baker, Lynda Carter, and Willie Nelson.

As in the television series, the film depicts the adventures of cousins Bo, Luke, and Daisy, and their Uncle Jesse, as they outfox crooked Hazzard County Commissioner Boss Hogg and Sheriff Rosco P. Coltrane.

The film was released on August 5, 2005, by Warner Bros. Pictures. While financially successful with an opening debut of $30 million and a worldwide gross of $109.8 million, the film met with generally negative reviews from critics. The film was followed by a standalone prequel titled The Dukes of Hazzard: The Beginning (2007).

== Plot ==
Cousins Bo, Luke, and Daisy Duke run a moonshine business for their Uncle Jesse in Hazzard County, Georgia. The cousins' primary mode of transportation is an orange 1969 Dodge Charger that the boys affectionately refer to as the "General Lee", named after General Robert Edward Lee. Along the way, the family is tormented by corrupt Hazzard County Commissioner Jefferson Davis Hogg, widely known as "Boss Hogg", and his willing but dimwitted henchman, Sheriff Rosco P. Coltrane.

Bo and Luke Duke are on a moonshine delivery when one of their customers finds Luke with his sister and he and his father give chase, but get the General Lee stuck at a construction site on a farm. The Dukes arrive at the Boar's Nest, where their cousin Daisy works, and see Billy Prickett, a famous stock-car driver, enter Hazzard to participate in the annual Hazard County Rally, having won four times before becoming a professional racer, a record Bo seeks to break. A fight breaks out between the Dukes and Prickett's crew, which is stopped by Rosco, who tells the Dukes the construction workers vandalized their car and it was towed to a local mechanic, Cooter Davenport. Meanwhile, Rosco plants a fake moonshine still in Uncle Jesse's barn and seizes the Duke property in the interest of eminent domain for Boss Hogg, forcing the family to temporarily reside with neighbor Pauline. She informs the Dukes that Rosco seized another farm on charges, so Bo and Luke investigate a local construction site and find their farm and neighboring farms marked on a map. They also discover a safe which they believe contains information that Boss Hogg wants to keep secret. Unable to get the safe open, they drag it to Sheev's. With his help they blow open the safe and discover geologic core samples but are unsure on what the samples are. Having learned Rosco plans to impound and auction off the General Lee, Cooter calls his friends to repair and soup up the General Lee. Bo and Luke meet him and drive off in the General to Atlanta.

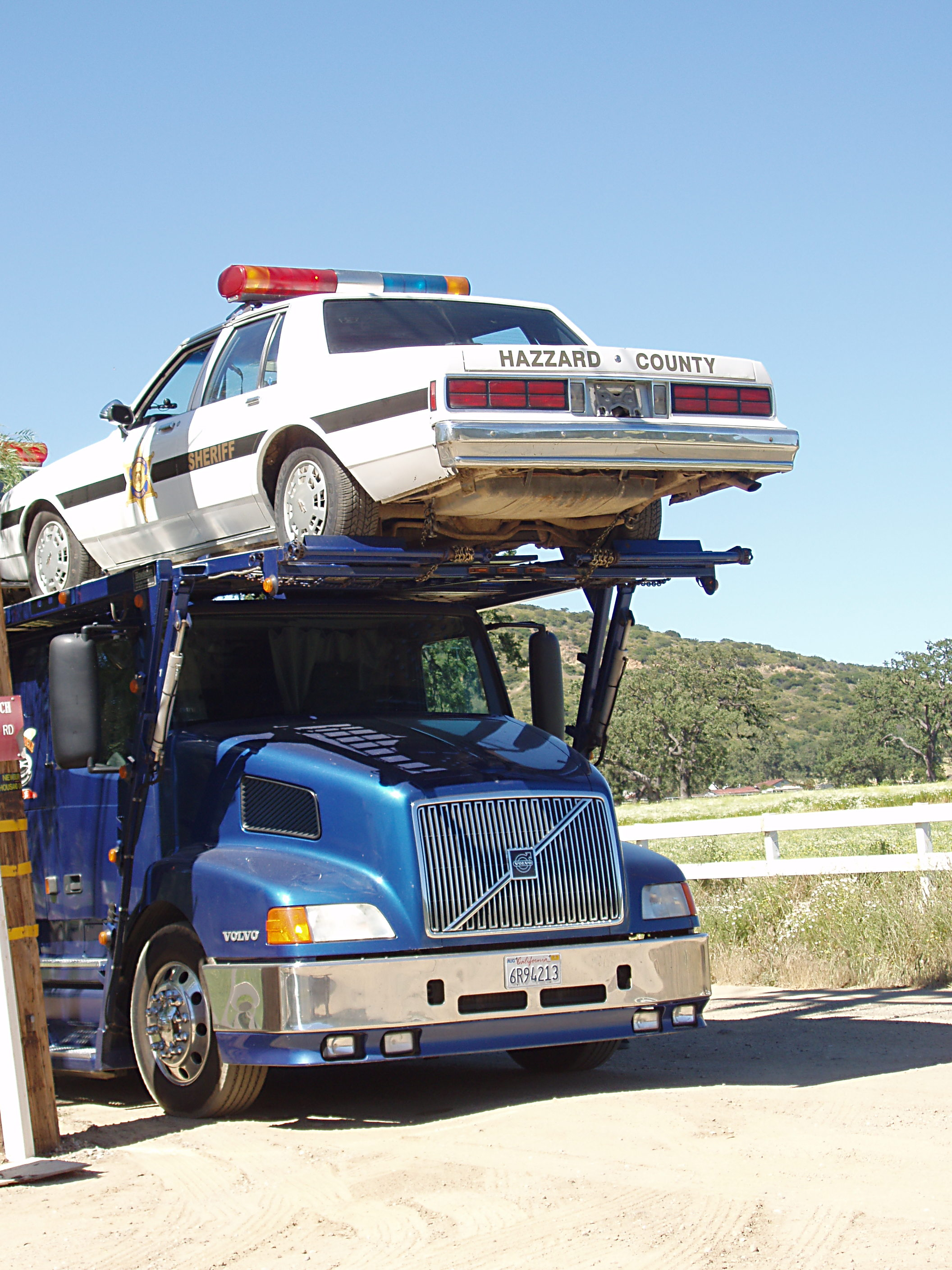
Sheriff's car at location in Thousand Oaks, California

The Dukes go to Atlanta to visit a local university geology lab, meeting with Katie-Lynn Johnson, a Hazzard county girl. They discover Boss Hogg's intentions of turning the county into a strip coal mine. However, before they can return to Hazzard county, they are arrested. Boss Hogg visits their prison cell, where he informs the Dukes that the vote on Hogg's proposition is at the same time as the rally, with Billy Prickett providing a distraction. During a transfer from detainment, Daisy helps the boys escape from the patrol car, and they speed home to try to inform the townsfolk, escaping the Atlanta Police, and the Georgia State Patrol.

Upon returning home, the Dukes discover that Boss Hogg and Rosco had taken Uncle Jesse and Pauline hostage. The two race to the farmhouse to cause a distraction to the waiting Hazzard County Sheriff's deputies and Georgia State Troopers, while Daisy and Cooter rescue Jesse and Pauline. Meanwhile, the college girls head to the rally with Sheev to inform the townsfolk about the vote on the strip-mining ordinance; however, because Sheev is a known conspiracy theorist, no one listens to them. Bo leaves for the rally while Luke and Jesse team up to foil the county and state police. Upon crossing the finish line first before Billy, the two then continue racing across town, leading the townsfolk to the courthouse, where the proposal is rejected.

Boss Hogg attempts to have the boys locked up but Daisy takes advantage of the governor of Georgia's presence and TV cameras to convince him to pardon them. The final scene shows a cook-out at the Dukes' house where the Dukes and the townspeople celebrate.

== Cast ==
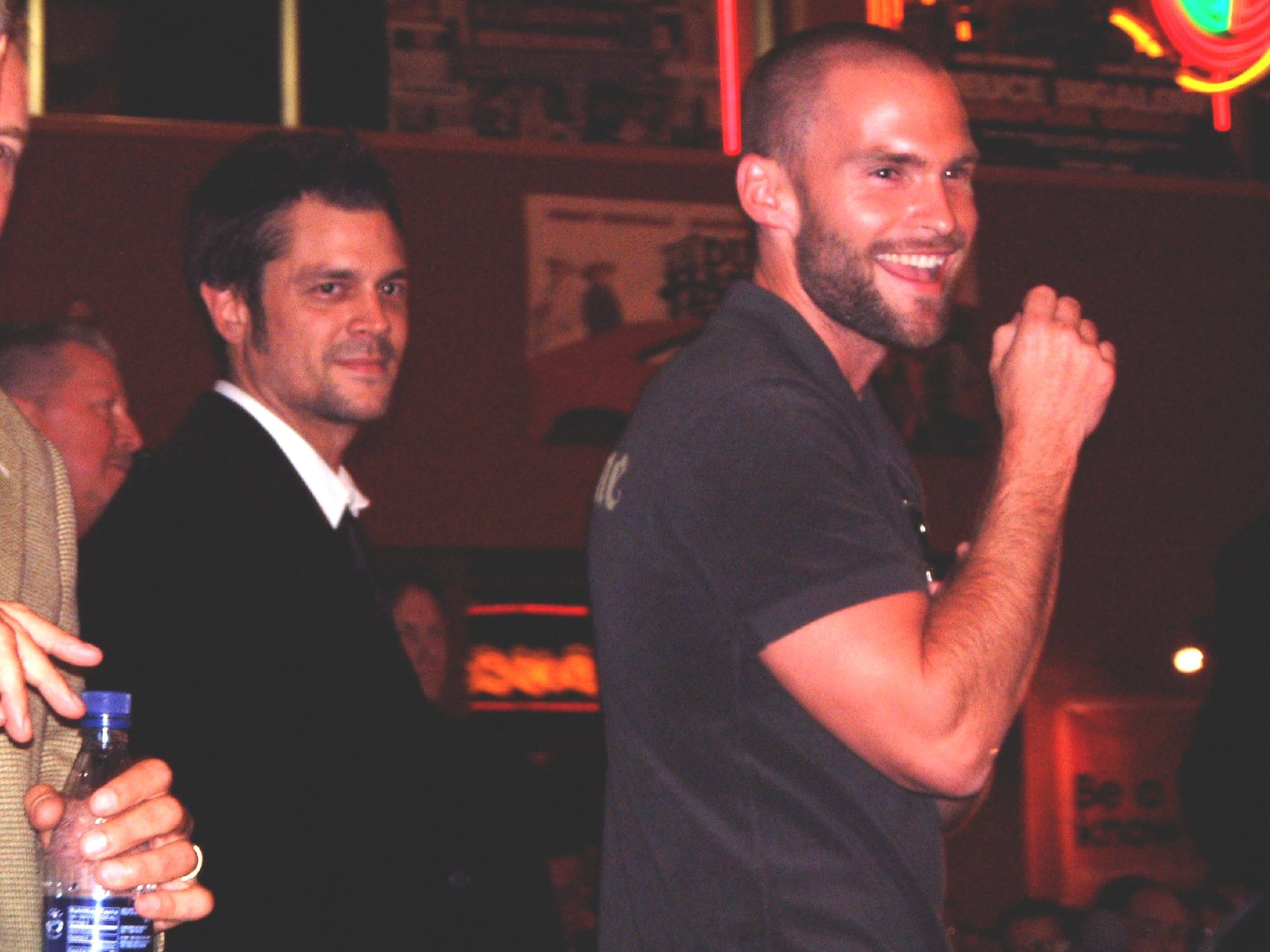
Knoxville and Scott at the premiere

- Johnny Knoxville as Luke Duke
- Seann William Scott as Bo Duke
- Jessica Simpson as Daisy Duke
- Burt Reynolds as Boss Hogg
- Willie Nelson as Uncle Jesse Duke
- David Koechner as Cooter Davenport
- M. C. Gainey as Sheriff Rosco P. Coltrane
- Michael Weston as Deputy Enos Strate
- Lynda Carter as Pauline Powers
- James Roday Rodriguez as Billy Prickett
- Kevin Heffernan as Derek "Sheev" Sheevington
- Nikki Griffin as Katie-Lynn Johnson
- Jacqui Maxwell as Annette
- Alice Greczyn as Laurie Pullman
- Junior Brown as The Balladeer (narrator)
- Joe Don Baker as Governor Jim Applewhite
- Barry Corbin as Bill Pullman
- Andrew Prine as Angry Man
- Brendan Schetter as Random Stoner
- Michael Roof as Dil Driscoll

=== Cameos ===
All five members of the comedy film troupe Broken Lizard appear in the film, four as cameos and Kevin Heffernan in a speaking role as Sheev.

Broken Lizard cameos

- Steve Lemme appears as Bill Pullman's son Jimmy, in a car-chase scene in which he accidentally shoots the inside of his father's truck.
- Jay Chandrasekhar and Erik Stolhanske reprise their roles as Ramathorn and Rabbit from the Broken Lizard comedy Super Troopers. The characters are now campus police officers, who warn the Duke boys for driving too slowly.
- Paul Soter appears as TV newsman Rick Shakely reporting from the Hazzard Road Rally.
- Charlie Finn appears as Royce Wilson, a dimwitted geology student who assists the Duke boys with the coal samples.

Other cameos

- Indy-car driver A. J. Foyt IV appears as himself during the bar fight.
- Rip Taylor appears in the final bloopers roll, interrupting the bedroom scene with Luke and the college girls.

== Production ==
=== Stunts ===
Knoxville said he was initially reluctant to take on the role, but was persuaded by script changes and the presence of Dan Bradley as stunt coordinator and second unit for the car-chase scenes. Knoxville praised him, saying, "everyone in Hollywood wants Dan Bradley to shoot their car stuff".

=== Locations ===
Principal photography for the film began on November 15, 2004, before wrapping up the following February. The majority of the film was shot in and around Clinton and French Settlement, Louisiana. The Boar's Nest was Moonlight Inn located in French Settlement. The street scenes are set in Atlanta, but filmed in the New Orleans Central Business District, and the university scenes were shot on the campus of Louisiana State University.

== Reception ==
=== Box office ===
The film was number one at the box office its opening weekend and grossed $30.7 million on 3,785 screens. It also had an adjusted-dollar rank of number 24 all-time for August releases. The film eventually collected $109.8 million worldwide, although it was much less successful financially outside the United States.

=== Critical reception ===
On Rotten Tomatoes, 14% of 169 reviews were positive. The website's consensus called the film "A dumb, goofy, and vacuous adaptation of a TV show where plot is simply an excuse to string together the car chases." On Metacritic the film has a weighted average score of 33% based on 36 reviews, indicating "Generally unfavorable reviews". Audiences polled by CinemaScore gave the film a grade "B+" on scale of A to F. Longtime fans of the original Dukes of Hazzard series were generally disappointed by the film.

Roger Ebert gave the film one star, calling it a "lame-brained, outdated wheeze" and wondered if Burt Reynolds' part in the film is "karma-wise... the second half of what Smokey and the Bandit was the first half of". Ebert also named it the second-worst film of the year and Richard Roeper named it the worst film of 2005. Ebert also included the film on his most hated list.

Owen Gleiberman of Entertainment Weekly gave it B+ grade and wrote: "It's trash, all right, but perfectly skewed trash — a comedy that knows just how smart to be about just how dumb it is."

=== Awards ===
At the 26th Golden Raspberry Awards, the film received seven nominations, but did not win any.

- Worst Picture - lost to Dirty Love
- Worst Director (Jay Chandrasekhar) - lost to John Mallory Asher for Dirty Love
- Worst Screenplay (John O'Brien) - lost to Jenny McCarthy for Dirty Love
- Worst Supporting Actor (Burt Reynolds) - lost to Hayden Christensen in Star Wars: Episode III – Revenge of the Sith
- Worst Supporting Actress (Jessica Simpson) - lost to Paris Hilton in House of Wax
- Worst Screen Couple (Jessica Simpson and her Daisy Dukes) - lost to Nicole Kidman and Will Ferrell in Bewitched
- Worst Remake or Sequel - lost to Son of the Mask

At the People's Choice Awards, Simpson won the "Favorite Song from a Movie" award for her cover of Nancy Sinatra's "These Boots Are Made for Walkin'".

The film was nominated for two MTV Movie Awards, including Best On-Screen Team (Johnny Knoxville, Seann William Scott, and Jessica Simpson), and Sexiest Performance (Jessica Simpson).

Simpson won the Choice Breakout Female award for her role in the film at the Teen Choice Awards.

== Controversies ==
Before the release of this film, Warner Bros. Pictures reportedly paid $17.5 million to the producer of Moonrunners, the movie that inspired the television series. This was soon followed by a claim from screenwriter Gy Waldron. The Hollywood Reporter reported that James Best, who portrayed Rosco P. Coltrane in the original series, filed suit in late July 2011 over royalties he was contracted to receive over spinoffs that "used his identity".

Ben Jones, who played Cooter Davenport in the original series, criticized the film for its emphasis on sexual content, suggesting that the original series was more family-oriented and not as sexualized. He called for fans of the television series to boycott the film "unless they clean it up before the August 5th release date." Some have countered that the original series also contained sexual themes, primarily Catherine Bach's (Daisy Duke) much-displayed "short shorts" (which have become so ubiquitous in American culture that skimpy blue jean cutoff shorts are now often simply called "Daisy Dukes"). In a film review, a New York Daily News entertainment columnist said the movie's sex humor is "cruder" than the TV series, but that it is "nearly identical to the TV series in... its ogling of the posterior of cousin Daisy Duke."

Although initially he commented that he enjoyed the new style of relationship between the movie versions of Bo and Luke, John Schneider, who played Bo Duke in the original series, was later asked if he saw the film and said: "My gosh... it was terrible! It wasn't Dukes. It was true to whatever it was; I just don't know what that was!"

John Schneider has said that when he arrived at the premiere, Johnny Knoxville came up to him and apologized for how bad the film was. Schneider has also questioned why TV channels show the film but are not prepared to rerun the original series.

== Soundtrack ==
Jessica Simpson recorded her own version of "These Boots Are Made for Walkin'" (and added her own lyrics) for the soundtrack to the film. Performed from the point of view of her character in the movie, Simpson's cover was co-produced by Jimmy Jam and Terry Lewis, and was released as the soundtrack's first single in 2005. It became Simpson's fifth top-20 single in the United States and its music video drew some controversy because of its sexual imagery. Both the original Ram Jam version of "Black Betty", and the Sylvia Massy–produced remake by Spiderbait appear in the film. AC/DC's "If You Want Blood (You've Got It)" and "Shoot to Thrill" are also played.

== Home media ==
The Dukes of Hazzard was released on DVD in December 2005 and on HD DVD in July 2006, but was never released on Blu-ray following the discontinuation of the HD DVD format in 2008.
