= Beerfest =

2006 comedy film directed by Jay Chandrasekhar

- Theatrical release poster
- Directed by: Jay Chandrasekhar
- Written by: Broken Lizard
- Produced by: Bill Gerber; Richard Perello
- Starring: Jay Chandrasekhar; Kevin Heffernan; Steve Lemme; Paul Soter; Erik Stolhanske; Will Forte; Ralf Möller; Mo'Nique; Eric Christian Olsen; Jürgen Prochnow; Cloris Leachman
- Cinematography: Frank G. DeMarco
- Edited by: Lee Haxall
- Music by: Nathan Barr
- Production companies: Legendary Pictures; Gerber Pictures; Cataland Films; Broken Lizard
- Distributed by: Warner Bros. Pictures
- Release date: August 25, 2006
- Running time: 111 minutes
- Country: United States
- Language: English
- Budget: $17.5 million
- Box office: $20.4 million

Beerfest is a 2006 American comedy film directed by Jay Chandrasekhar and written by the comedy group Broken Lizard (Chandrasekhar, Kevin Heffernan, Steve Lemme, Paul Soter, and Erik Stolhanske), who also star in the film alongside Nat Faxon, Will Forte, Ralf Möller, Mo'Nique, Eric Christian Olsen, Jürgen Prochnow, Cloris Leachman, and Donald Sutherland. The film was theatrically released on August 25, 2006.

== Plot ==
At the funeral of their German-born grandfather Johann von Wolfhausen, brothers Jan and Todd Wolfhouse discover that family tradition demands that they travel to Munich at Oktoberfest to spread his cremated ashes at the Theresienwiese. There, the brothers unintentionally start an altercation that takes down an entire Oktoberfest tent. They then encounter Mr. Schniedelwichsen and get led to the location of and participate in Beerfest, an underground international drinking game tournament run by Baron Wolfgang von Wolfhausen, after discovering that the von Wolfhausens are related to the Wolfhouses, with the German team angrily denying the family ties, revealing that Johann was a stable boy who stole the recipe for "ze greatest beer in all ze world" decades ago and ran away with his prostitute mother (the brothers' great-grandmother), Great Gam Gam and then killing Schiedelwichsen for leading the boys to Beerfest. Enraged by the mockery of their ancestors, Jan and Todd challenge the Germans to a drinking game. The brothers' defeat humiliates them in front of everybody, with Wolfgang pouring their grandfather's ashes on them and Jan gets punched in the eye.

Swearing to get revenge on the Germans, Jan and Todd return to Colorado where they recruit their drinking friends from college—binge drinker and competitive eater Phil "Landfill" Krundle, Jewish scientist Charlie "Fink" Finklestein, and male prostitute and ex-competitive drinking gamer Barry Badrinath—to assemble an American Beerfest team, though they do not divulge this to Great Gam Gam. During the team's year of training, Jan and Todd find out that their grandfather did not steal the family beer recipe, but was actually the rightful heir to the family brewery in Bavaria. The team finds the family recipe in Johann's puppet, Po-Po, and uses the recipe to brew Schnitzengiggle Beer, whose delicious taste fills them with awe.

After the German team receives a bottle of Schnitzengiggle in the mail, the Wolfhausen clan goes to America vowing to take the recipe back. Following a confrontation between the Wolfhausens and Jan and Todd, the Wolfhausens forge evidence and pose as immigrant workers claiming that the brothers' restaurant has health issues to put them out of business. Barry quits the team after a fallout with Todd involving his past with Todd's wife. Fink quits the team, having been fired due to a slipping performance at the lab. Meanwhile, Landfill catches Great Gam Gam's caregiver Cherry stealing the beer recipe for the Germans. He overwhelms Cherry in a fight, but is pushed into a vat full of beer in which the yeast ingredient submerges him, during which he attempts to drink his way out only to drown. Minutes later, Jan discovers Landfill's body. Thinking Landfill committed suicide because of the strain that his involvement was putting on their marriage, the team decides to disband.

After the funeral, Great Gam Gam reveals that she knew about Beerfest the entire time while stating that she was a whore. She then motivates the bereaved team with a rousing speech, and everyone except Barry change their minds. Barry explains that he cannot join due to a traumatizing incident years ago during a game of table tennis in Thailand that he won, in which the big end of a racket was forcefully shoved up his anus. Sympathizing with Barry, Great Gam Gam encourages him to rise above it, causing him to relent and join the team. Shortly after, Landfill's Southern twin brother Gil reveals himself to the group and offers to join the team, which they accept. Like his brother; Gil can drink copious amounts of beer, stating that he taught his brother everything he knew about drinking, and he even invites the other members of the team to call him "Landfill" in his memory.

The team arrives in Germany and uses an empty wooden keg as a Trojan Horse to get inside, where they emerge to boos and jeers. The Americans are allowed to participate after Jan and Todd show how uncannily they resemble the two Beerfest founders, thus convincing the crowd and some of the competitors of their von Wolfhausen ancestry. During this time, Fink discovered how to beat Das Boot while everyone sees that Cherry was working for the von Wolfhausens the whole time. The Americans and the Germans face off in the finals, and upon reaching the tie-breaking bootline chug, Cherry gibes Gil about the death of his brother, causing him to crack under pressure and the Germans to win. Jan offers the Germans a double or nothing opportunity, The family recipe and their family's brewery are put up for grabs. The Germans tell Jan they already have the recipe and thus no need for a rematch, but Fink points out that Cherry only stole a recipe for a low-carbohydrate strawberry beer, prompting Wolfgang to have Cherry killed. They face off in another bootline chug this time with 10 boots. When one of the von Wolfhausens knocks off Fink's yarmulke, he enters into a state of purely concentrated rage which allows him to coach the team to victory, barely gaining the win when the German team's anchor fails to finish "Das Boot" (beer boot) by one drop, breaking a tie between them. Some time later they meet Willie Nelson in Amsterdam and agree to participate in a pot-smoking competition.

== Cast ==
- Paul Soter as Jan Wolfhouse, Johann's youngest Grandson
- Erik Stolhanske as
  - Todd Wolfhouse, Johann's oldest Grandson
  - Baron Ludwig von Wolfhausen, Germany's greatest brewmeister
- Cloris Leachman as Great Gam Gam Wolfhouse, Jan and Todd's great grandmother and Ludwig's lover
- Donald Sutherland as Johann von Wolfhouse, oldest legitimate son of Baron Ludwig, died before the start of the film
- Jay Chandrasekhar as
  - Barry Badrinath, a former drinking game champ who Todd has a past with
  - Blind Sikh
- Kevin Heffernan as
  - Phil "Landfill" Krundle, a competitive eater and former brewery worker whom Jan and Todd recruited for their USA team
  - Gil "Landfill" Krundle, Phil's twin brother, took on the mantle after Phil died
  - Random Sausage Lady
- Blanchard Ryan as Krista Krundle, Phil's wife
- Steve Lemme as
  - Charlie "Fink" Finkelstein, a University scientist with knowledge of beer, recruited on the USA team
  - Emcee
- Jürgen Prochnow as Baron Wolfgang von Wolfhausen, Ludwig's youngest son in possession of the Von Wolfhausen brewery and host of Beerfest
- Nat Faxon as Rolf, Wolfgang's grandson
- Will Forte as Otto, Wolfgang's grandson
- Eric Christian Olsen as Gunther, Wolfgang's grandson
- Ralf Möller as Hammacher, Wolfgang's grandson, one of the muscular sets
- Gunter Schlierkamp as Schlemmer, Wolfgang's grandson, one of the muscular sets
- Mo'Nique as Cherry, Great Gam Gam's housekeeper who turned out to be Wolfgang's mistress
- M. C. Gainey as Priest
- James Roday Rodriguez as German messenger
- Philippe Brenninkmeyer as Herr Referee
- Chauntal Lewis as Girl Sprayed by Keg
- Willie Nelson as himself (uncredited cameo)
- Simona Fusco as Ulsa
- Isaac Kappy as Antonio the Hustler
- Bjorn Johnson as Mr. Schniedelwichsen, the guide that led Jan and Todd to Beerfest

== Production ==
Beerfest was initially set up at Sony Pictures but was acquired by Warner Bros. Pictures, who had distributed earlier films by Broken Lizard.

When asked about where the concept for the film came from, Jay Chandrasekhar said "We were at a beer garden in Australia (wearing our police uniforms) and we went on stage and challenged the top five drinkers in the room to a chug off. The place exploded. We were winning, but then Paul Soter started drinking and we quickly lost. Then we had arm wrestling contests. Then Steve Lemme insulted national treasure, Russell Crowe and we had to be escorted out by security. We thought that would be a fun movie. The drinking beer part."

The film was shot in Albuquerque, New Mexico.

== Release ==
Beerfest was theatrically released on August 25, 2006.

Two versions of the film have been released on home media: the theatrical version and an unrated version. The unrated version runs ten minutes longer and includes another eight brief scenes.

=== Critical response ===
On Rotten Tomatoes, the film holds an approval rating of 41% based on 106 reviews, with an average rating of 5.04/10. The website's critical consensus reads, "Beerfest features some laugh-inducing gags, but is too long and the pacing too uneven to form a coherent, functioning comedy." On Metacritic, the film has a weighted average score of 46 out of 100, based on 25 critics, indicating "mixed or average" reviews.

David Jenkins in Time Out magazine wrote it "appears to have been conceived on the back of a beermat and its trashy direction, nonexistent plot and dismal comic mugging would seem to suggest that preparations progressed no further". Jeannette Catsoulis of The New York Times disagreed: "Best viewed while sloshed, Beerfest is idiotic, tasteless and irrepressibly good-natured in other words, a frat-house classic".

== Planned sequel ==
Despite the statement at the end of Beerfest that Potfest is "coming soon", Broken Lizard intended this as a joke to get publicity. They have stated both that fans were very supportive of the title and that Broken Lizard may decide to make an animated film of the same name. In July 2012, Broken Lizard member Jay Chandraskehar revealed the Smokefest might actually happen, and that Willie Nelson, Cheech of Cheech & Chong and Snoop Dogg agreed to appear in the movie. In June 2013, it was confirmed that the movie would be released after Super Troopers 2. In 2014, it was confirmed that it would be a live action film rather than the proposed animated film. It was later announced, in 2016, that a Beerfest TV series will air on CW Seed. Beerfest: Thirst for Victory was released as a television film in 2018, with no involvement from Broken Lizard.
