= Jay Chandrasekhar =

American film director

- Born: Jayanth Jambulingam Chandrasekhar; 1967 or 1968 (age 58–59); Chicago, Illinois, U.S.
- Education: Colgate University
- Occupations: Actor; screenwriter; director
- Years active: 1996–present
- Known for: Broken Lizard
- Spouse: Susan Clarke (m. 2005)
- Children: 3
- Relatives: Sendhil Ramamurthy (cousin)

Jayanth Jambulingam Chandrasekhar (born 1967 or 1968) is an American actor, screenwriter, and director. He is best known for his work with the sketch comedy group Broken Lizard and for directing and starring in the Broken Lizard films such as the Super Troopers film series, Club Dread, and Beerfest. Since 2001, he has also worked frequently as a television director on many episodes of Community and The Goldbergs, among dozens of comedy series. He has also occasionally worked as a film director outside of Broken Lizard projects, most notably on the 2005 film The Dukes of Hazzard.

== Early life and education ==
Chandrasekhar was born at Cook County Hospital in Chicago, Illinois. His parents are physicians of Tamil origin originally from Chennai, India. Chandrasekhar grew up in Hinsdale, Illinois, and attended high school at the Lake Forest Academy. After attending Loyola University for a semester, he graduated from Colgate University with a major in European history and a minor in philosophy.

== Career ==
=== Broken Lizard comedy troupe ===
Chandrasekhar formed Broken Lizard with former members of comedy troupe Charred Goosebeak and Beta Theta Pi, people he met during college at Colgate University. Chandrasekhar said he found his path to comedy after acting in high school and college. He did some open mic standup comedy work in Chicago and founded a sketch group called "Charred Goose Beak" at college. After moving to New York, the group was renamed Broken Lizard.

Chandrasekhar began making shorts featuring the troupe, then made the self-funded movie Puddle Cruiser in 1996. The film made it into the Sundance Film Festival in 1997. Then in 2001, they made Super Troopers as an independent movie, which Harvey Weinstein helped to develop at Miramax Films, but did not end up distributing.

=== Directing ===
In 2005, Chandrasekhar directed The Dukes of Hazzard. The action comedy film based on the 1970s American television series of the same name was the debut of pop singer Jessica Simpson as an actress. While financially successful, the film was met with negative reviews from critics. He has become an established television comedy director, directing episodes of Undeclared, Happy Endings, Chuck, Community, Psych, New Girl, and Arrested Development. He says that the earlier a director joins a show, the more impact he or she will have on its look and feel.

In 2012, Chandrasekhar made the movie The Babymakers. He directed several episodes of Blue Mountain State. Amazon released a pilot in the 2014 Amazon Original Series that he wrote and directed called Really.

Between 2014 and 2018, he directed 16 episodes of The Goldbergs.

In June 2018, the filmmaker revealed that he is in discussions with Marvel Studios to direct one of their upcoming movies.

In February 2021, Chandrasekhar was announced as the director of the family comedy Easter Sunday, starring Jo Koy.

=== Acting ===
Chandrasekhar guest starred alongside his cousin Sendhil Ramamurthy in a 2009 episode of Psych, which Chandrasekhar also directed. He appeared as the cab driver in the "Terror Taxi" skit from Jackass: Number Two. He appeared as racist comedian Gupta Gupti Gupta in the episode "Basic Email Security" of Community, which Chandrasekhar also directed. In 2018 Chandrasekhar Appeared in the Brooklyn Nine-Nine episode “Nutriboom” as himself.

=== Stand-up ===
Chandrasekhar often does stand-up comedy, sometimes touring with fellow Broken Lizard friends, Steve Lemme and Kevin Heffernan.

== Personal life ==
Chandrasekhar has been married to actress Susan Clarke since 2005. They have twin daughters and a son. Chandrasekhar's middle name, Jambulingam, is in honor of his grandfather, and is also his son's middle name. He used the name Jumbulingam for his editorial credits.

Chandrasekhar's cousin is the actor Sendhil Ramamurthy.

== Filmography ==
=== Films ===
Year	Title	Credited as		Notes
Year	Title	Director	Writer	Notes
1996	Puddle Cruiser	Yes	Yes	
2001	Super Troopers	Yes	Yes	
2004	Club Dread	Yes	Yes	
2005	The Dukes of Hazzard	Yes	No	
2006	Beerfest	Yes	Yes	
2009	The Slammin' Salmon	No	Yes	
2010	Held Up	Yes	No	
2010	Broken Lizard Stands Up	Yes	Yes	
2012	The Babymakers	Yes	No	Also co-producer
2018	Super Troopers 2	Yes	Yes	
2022	Easter Sunday	Yes	No	
2023	Quasi	No	Yes	Also executive producer
2026	Super Troopers 3	Yes	Yes	Also executive producer Post-production
TBA	Yogi Bear 2	Yes	No	

=== Acting roles ===
Year	Title	Role
1996	Puddle Cruiser	Zach
2001	Super Troopers	Arcot "Thorny" Ramathorn
2004	Club Dread	Putman Livingston
2005	The Dukes of Hazzard	Arcot "Thorny" Ramathorn
2006	Beerfest	Barry Badrinath/Blind Sikh
2006	Jackass Number Two	Himself/Terror Taxi host
2009	I Love You, Man	Party Guest
2009	The Slammin' Salmon	Nuts/Zongo
2009	The 2 Bobs	Spam King
2010	Broken Lizard Stands Up	Self
2012	The Babymakers	Ron Jon
2012	Freeloaders	Porn Director
2015	Community	Gupta Gupti Gupta
2018	Super Troopers 2	Arcot "Thorny" Ramathorn
2021	Plan B	Pharmacist
2022	Easter Sunday	Nick
2023	Quasi	King Guy/Blouin
2026	Super Troopers 3	Arcot "Thorny" Ramathorn

=== Editor ===
Year	Title
1996	Puddle Cruiser
1999	Los Enchiladas!
1999	Two Ninas
2001	Super Troopers
2005	The Dukes of Hazzard

=== Director ===
Year	Title	Episode
2001–2002	Undeclared	"Hal and Hillary"; "Hell Week" "Rush and Pledge"
2003	Andy Richter Controls the Universe	"Saturday Early Evening Fever"
2004	Oliver Beene	"Kissing Babies"
2004	Cracking Up	"Grudge Match"
2003–2004	Arrested Development	"Justice is Blind"; "Altar Egos"; "Beef Consommé"; "My Mother The Car"
2006–2007	The Loop	"The Dutch"; "CSI: Donut Idol Bowl"; "The Rusty Trombone"; "The Tiger Express"
2007	Human Giant	"Ta Da"; "Lil 9-11"; "Let's Go"
2008	Lipstick Jungle	"Chapter 4: Bombay Highway"; "Chapter 17: Bye, Bye Baby"
2008–2009	Knight Rider	"Knight of the Hunter"; "Fly by Knight"
2008–2012	Psych	"Let's Doo-Wop It Again"; "Chivalry Is Not Dead... But Someone Is"; "Bollywood Homicide"; "The Greatest Adventure in the History of Basic Cable"
2008–2012	Chuck	"Chuck Versus the Ex"; "Chuck Versus the Suburbs"; "Chuck Versus the Living Dead"; "Chuck Versus the Balcony"; "Chuck Versus Sarah"
2009–2012	Royal Pains	"The Hankover"; "A Guest House Divided"; "Hank and the Deep Blue Sea"; "Am I Blue?"
2010–2011	Blue Mountain State	"Superstition"; "The Peak"; "Riot"; "Drunk Tank"; "Marathon Monday"
2010–2015	Community	"Mixology Certification"; "Intro to Political Science"; "Applied Anthropology and Culinary Arts"; "The First Chang Dynasty"; "Advanced Documentary Filmmaking"; "Introduction to Teaching"; "Basic Story"; "Basic Email Security"; "Basic RV Repair and Palmistry"
2011–2012	Happy Endings	"The Girl with the David Tattoo"; "Meet the Parrots"; "You Snooze, You Bruise"; "More Like Stanksgiving"
2011–2012	Up All Night	"First Night Away"; "Baby Fever"
2012	Warehouse 13	"No Pain, No Gain"
2012	Animal Practice	"Dr. Yamamazing"
2012	Ben & Kate	"Career Day"
2014	Really	"Pilot" (Also wrote and produced)
2014–2018	New Girl	"Sister III"; "The Crawl"; "Jeff Day"; "Mario"; "The Cubicle"
2014–2021	The Goldbergs	23 episodes
2015–2016	The Grinder	"The Curious Disappearance of Mr. Donovan"; "A System on Trial"; "Full Circle"
2016	Crazy Ex-Girlfriend	"When Will Josh See How Cool I Am?"
2017–2019	Fresh Off the Boat	"A League of Her Own"; "Workin' the Ween"; "TMI: Too Much Integrity"
2018	The Mayor	"The Lockdown"
2018	Instinct	"Long Shot"
2018	Us & Them	"Corn & Cancer"
2019	Lethal Weapon	"Dial M for Murtaugh"
2019	Single Parents	"That Elusive Zazz"
2019–2020	Schooled	"Tamagotchis and Bells"; "CB Likes Lainey"; "The Rudy-ing of Toby Murphy"; "FeMellor"
2019-2023	Good Trouble	"In The Middle"; "New Moon"; "Baby, Just Say Yes"; "About Damn Time"
2021	Resident Alien	"Birds of a Feather"; "Love Language"
2022	Monarch	"About Last Night"
2022	The Mighty Ducks: Game Changers	"Trade Rumors"; "Summer Breezers"
2023	Home Economics	"Gallon of Milk, $4.35"
2023–2026	Animal Control	"Dogs and Bears and Minks"; "Cows and Raccoons"; "Peacocks and Pumas"; "Dogs and Chickens"; "Goats, Snakes and Dogs"; "Baby Kangaroos and Chickens"; "Bats and Camels"; "Scaredy Cats and Card Sharks"; "Crows and Lizard Dogs"; "Tortoises and Billy Goats"

=== Acting roles ===
Year	Title	Role	Note
2004	The 100 Scariest Movie Moments	Himself	TV special
2007	Attack of the Show	Co-host	
2007	Welcome to the Parker		Episode 1
2009	Psych	Jawaharlal "Jay" Singh	Episode "Bollywood Homicide"
2012	Royal Pains	Jake	Episode "A Guesthouse Divided"
2013	Call Me Crazy: A Five Film	Joey	TV movie
2013	Franklin & Bash	JD Altero	Episode "Gone in a Flash"
2014	Really		
2015	Community	Gupta Gupti Gupta	Episode "Basic Email Security"
2016	Family Guy	Indian Man / Census Taker	Episode "Road to India"
2018	Nailed It	Guest judge	Episode 6: "In Your Face!"
2018	Brooklyn Nine-Nine	Himself	Episode NutriBoom
