= Nat Faxon =

American actor (born 1975)

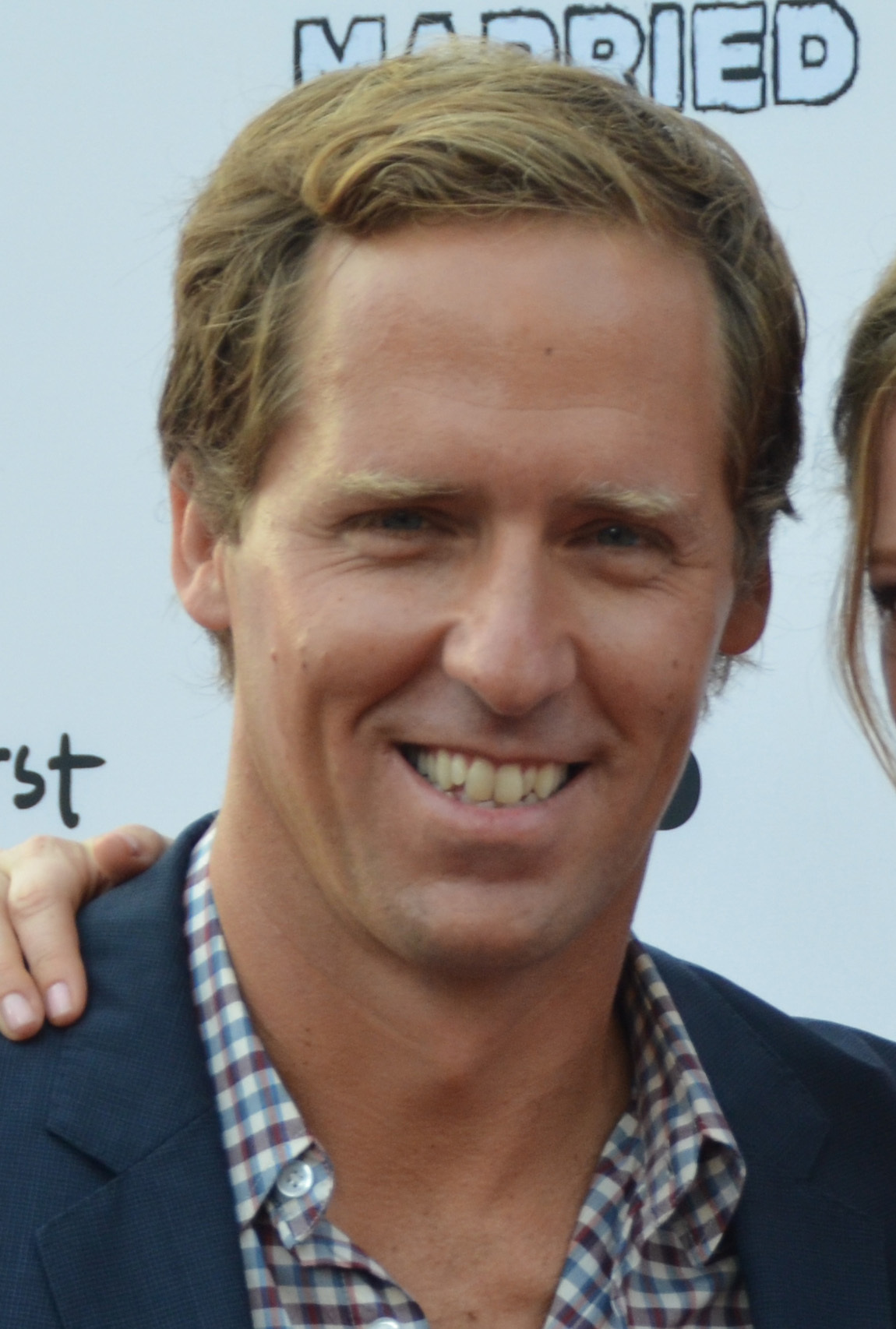
- Faxon at the series premiere of Married in July 2014
- Born: Nathaniel Wales Faxon; October 11, 1975 (age 51); Boston, Massachusetts, U.S.
- Education: Hamilton College
- Occupations: Actor, comedian, screenwriter, director
- Years active: 1999–present
- Spouse: Meaghan Gadd (m. 2007)
- Children: 3

Nathaniel Wales Faxon (born October 11, 1975) is an American actor and comedian. A frequent presence on comedic films and TV series, he won the Academy Award for Best Adapted Screenplay for co-writing The Descendants (2011). He starred in the Fox comedy series Ben and Kate (2012–2013) and the FX comedy series Married (2014–2015), and voices Elfo in the Netflix adult animated television series Disenchantment (2018–2023).

He co-wrote The Descendants (2011) alongside writing partners Alexander Payne and Jim Rash, for which they received the Academy Award, Independent Spirit Award and Writers Guild of America Award for Best Adapted Screenplay. They were also nominated for the BAFTA Award, Golden Globe Award, and Critics' Choice Movie Award. Faxon has since, with Rash, written and directed the comedy films The Way, Way Back (2013), and Downhill (2020).

== Early life ==
Faxon was born Nathaniel Wales Faxon on October 11, 1975, in Boston, Massachusetts to Monica (née Kersten) and David Faxon.

Faxon's early years were spent in the seaside community of Manchester-by-the-Sea, Massachusetts, where he attended the Brookwood School. He later graduated from the Holderness School near Plymouth, New Hampshire, and then Hamilton College in 1997.

== Career ==
=== Acting ===
Faxon is an alumnus of the Los Angeles-based improvisational and sketch comedy troupe The Groundlings, where he began performing in 2001.

He may be best known for his appearances in comedic films such as Orange County (2002), Walk Hard: The Dewey Cox Story (2007), Bad Teacher (2011), and several Broken Lizard films including Beerfest (2006). He co-starred in Darren Star's semi-autobiographical satire Grosse Pointe and had recurring roles in several television series, including The Cleveland Show, Joey, Up All Night and Reno 911!. He has also appeared on the Roseanne spin-off The Conners since 2020 as Neville Goldufski.

Faxon has been featured in a series of prominent Holiday Inn commercials featuring Joe Buck, as well as an ad by Blockbuster. In 2012, he was cast as Ben Fox on the Fox sitcom Ben and Kate. He starred with Judy Greer in the FX comedy series Married, which ran for two seasons.

=== Writing and directing ===
Faxon and writing partner Jim Rash, whom he met while performing with The Groundlings, co-wrote the screenplay for the film The Descendants, starring George Clooney and directed by Alexander Payne. On February 26, 2012, the screenplay for The Descendants won an Oscar, with Faxon, Rash, and Payne sharing the award. The duo made their directorial debut with The Way, Way Back (2013), based on their original screenplay, and starring Steve Carell, Toni Collette and Sam Rockwell. It premiered at the Sundance Film Festival, where Fox Searchlight Pictures acquired it for $10 million; it was released domestically to positive reviews that July.

== Personal life ==
Faxon is married to Meaghan Gadd. They have three children.

== Filmography ==
=== Film ===
| Year | Title | Role | Notes |
|---|---|---|---|
| 2002 | Orange County | Kip | |
| 2002 | Slackers | Karl, the Grad Student | |
| 2004 | Club Dread | Manny | |
| 2006 | The TV Set | Reporter | |
| 2006 | Beerfest | Rolf | |
| 2007 | Walk Hard: The Dewey Cox Story | Awards Show Stage Manager | |
| 2008 | Hamlet 2 | Glenn from Copy Shop | |
| 2008 | Lower Learning | Turner Abernathy | |
| 2009 | The Slammin' Salmon | Carl the Manager | |
| 2011 | Freeloaders | Fritz | |
| 2011 | Bad Teacher | Mark | |
| 2011 | Zookeeper | Dave | |
| 2011 | The Descendants | —N/a | Co-screenwriter; Academy Award for Best Adapted Screenplay |
| 2012 | The Babymakers | Zig-Zag | |
| 2013 | The Way, Way Back | Roddy | Also co-screenwriter and co-director |
| 2014 | Tammy | Greg | |
| 2014 | Sex Tape | Max | |
| 2016 | Operator | Gregg | |
| 2017 | Thoroughbreds | —N/a | Producer |
| 2017 | A Happening of Monumental Proportions | Paramedic #2 | |
| 2018 | Life of the Party | Lance | |
| 2018 | Father of the Year | Mardy | |
| 2019 | Ready or Not | Justin (voice) | |
| 2019 | Charlie's Angels | Peter Fleming | |
| 2020 | Downhill | —N/a | Co-director and co-screenwriter |
| 2021 | Yes Day | Mr. Deacon | |
| 2022 | Beavis and Butt-Head Do the Universe | Jim Hartson (voice) | |
| 2024 | Orion and the Dark | Worrisome Insomnia (voice) | |
| 2026 | Miss You, Love You | —N/a | Producer |
| 2026 | Super Troopers 3 | Captain Todd Markowski | |
| TBA | The Decline of Fucking Western Civilization | | Filming |

=== Television ===
| Year | Title | Role | Notes |
|---|---|---|---|
| 1999 | Rude Awakening | Slackula | Episode: "Slackula" |
| 2000–2001 | Grosse Pointe | Kevin the P.A. | 17 episodes |
| 2003–2004 | Reno 911! | Milk Shake | 6 episodes |
| 2004 | Significant Others | Breck | Episode: "A Breck, a Brother & a Funeral" |
| 2004–2005 | Joey | Bodie | 3 episodes |
| 2005 | Romy and Michele: In the Beginning | Chad | TV movie |
| 2005 | NCIS | Carter Finch | Episode: "The Voyeur's Web" |
| 2005 | Reba | Elder Care Worker | Episode: "Grannies Gone Wild" |
| 2005–2014 | American Dad! | Various voices | 4 episodes |
| 2006–2008 | Happy Hour | Brad Cooper | 14 episodes |
| 2008 | Mad Men | Flatty | Episode: "The Benefactor" |
| 2009 | DJ & the Fro | The Fro (voice) | 12 episodes |
| 2009 | Glenn Martin, DDS | Trailer Park Teen (voice) | Episode: "Halloween Hangover" |
| 2009 | The Big D | Brady | Pilot |
| 2009 | The Burr Effect | Dale | Pilot |
| 2009–2012 | The Cleveland Show | Raymond the Bear (voice) | 10 episodes |
| 2010 | Party Down | Garlan Greenbush | Episode: "Party Down Company Picnic" |
| 2011 | Allen Gregory | Jeremy (voice) | 7 episodes |
| 2011 | Happy Endings | Chef Leslie | Episode: "Bo Fight" |
| 2012 | Are You There, Chelsea? | Tim Kornick | Episode: "How to Succeed in Business Without Really Crying" |
| 2012 | Up All Night | Lawrence | Episode: "Couple Friends" |
| 2012–2013 | Ben and Kate | Ben Fox | Main role |
| 2013 | Comedy Bang! Bang! | Earl of Crathmore | Episode: "Jessica Alba Wears a Jacket with Patent Leather Pumps" |
| 2013 | Spy | Alan | Pilot |
| 2013–2014 | Trophy Wife | Sad Steve | 3 episodes |
| 2014 | Randy Cunningham: 9th Grade Ninja | Sinjin Knightfire (voice) | Episode: "Julian's Birthday Surprise/True Bromance" |
| 2014 | Marry Me | Scooby | Episode: "Win Me" |
| 2014 | Benched | Harold | Episode: "Solitary Refinement" |
| 2014–2015 | Married | Russ Bowman | Main role |
| 2014–2016 | TripTank | Various voices | 8 episodes |
| 2014–2022 | Robot Chicken | Various voices | 6 episodes |
| 2014–2025 | Blaze and the Monster Machines | Pickle, Joe (voice) | Main role |
| 2015 | Community | —N/a | Director, 2 episodes |
| 2015 | The Grinder | Lyle | Episode: "Little Mitchard No More" |
| 2015–2018 | SuperMansion | Ivan Whiff (voice) | 3 episodes |
| 2015–2023 | Family Guy | Various voices | 5 episodes |
| 2016 | Black-ish | Joseph Everton | Episode: "Super Rich Kids" |
| 2016, 2020 | Mike Tyson Mysteries | Will / Nat O'Sullivan (voice) | 2 episodes |
| 2017 | Jeff & Some Aliens | Farmer (voice) | Episode: "Jeff & Some Energy Trading" |
| 2017 | Speechless | Undercover Boss | Episode: "J-J'S D-R-- DREAM" |
| 2017 | Dogs in a Park | Various dogs (voice) | 8 episodes |
| 2017–2018 | Nobodies | Himself | 3 episodes |
| 2017–2019 | Friends from College | Nick | Main role |
| 2018 | Great News | Anthony Lyon | Episode: "Early Retirement" |
| 2018 | Dallas & Robo | Clark (voice) | 3 episodes |
| 2018 | Summer Camp Island | Popular Banana Split (voice) | Episode: "Popular Banana Split" |
| 2018 | The Guest Book | Derek | Episode: "Finding Reality" |
| 2018 | The Kids Are Alright | Tom | Episode: "Christmas 1972" |
| 2018–2020 | The Epic Tales of Captain Underpants | Captain Underpants/Mr. Krupp (voice) | Main role |
| 2018–2023 | Disenchantment | Elfo (voice) | Main role |
| 2019 | Harvey Street Kids | Stu (voice) | 3 episodes |
| 2019 | Catastrophe | Pat | Episode #4.6 |
| 2019 | Life in Pieces | Hayes | Episode: "Jungle Push Resort Anniversary" |
| 2019 | Euphoria | Rick | Episode: "The Trials and Tribulations of Trying to Pee While Depressed" |
| 2019–2020 | Harvey Girls Forever! | Stu (voice) | 5 episodes |
| 2019, 2021 | Tacoma FD | Frenchie Willikers | 2 episodes |
| 2020 | Narcos: Mexico | Ted Faye | 2 episodes |
| 2020 | Solar Opposites | Bryson (voice) | Episode: "The Lavatic Reactor" |
| 2020–2021 | It's Pony | Mr. Underwood (voice) | 3 episodes |
| 2020–2025 | The Conners | Neville Goldufskyi | Recurring role |
| 2021 | The Great North | Calvin Prescott (voice) | Episode: "Avocado Barter Adventure" |
| 2021 | Archibald's Next Big Thing Is Here! | Randy (voice) | Episode: "A Star is Hatched/Say Cheese" |
| 2021 | The Chicken Squad | Endicott (voice) | 2 episodes |
| 2021–2023 | HouseBroken | Chief/Various (voice) | Main role |
| 2022 | Gaslit | Bob Haldeman | 4 episodes |
| 2022 | A League of Their Own | Marshall | 4 episodes |
| 2022–2023 | Our Flag Means Death | The Swede | Recurring role |
| 2022–2024 | Firebuds | Throttle / Uncle Dan (voice) | 5 episodes |
| 2022–present | Loot | Arthur | Main role |
| 2023–2024 | Frog and Toad | Frog (voice) | Main role |
| 2023–2024 | Mulligan | Matty Mulligan (voice) | Main role |
| 2024 | Hit-Monkey | Boone (voice) | 8 episodes |
| 2025 | Ghosts | Alexander Hamilton | Episode: "Alexander Hamilton and the Ruffle Kerfuffle" |
| 2025 | Love, Death & Robots | Waffle Maker (voice) | Episode: "Smart Appliances, Stupid Owners" |
| 2025 | Watson | Hobie McSorley | 2 episodes |
| 2026 | Sofia the First: Royal Magic | King Ziggy (voice) | Guest role |
| 2026 | President Curtis | Michael (voice) | 2 episodes |
| 2026 | Futurama | Elfo (voice) | Episode: "A New New York Yankee in King Elfo's Court" |
| 2026 | Elsbeth | Perry Macintyre | Episode: "A Bad Lie" |

== Awards and nominations ==
| Year | Award | Category | Title of work | Result |
|---|---|---|---|---|
| 2011 | Washington D.C. Area Film Critics Association Awards | Best Adapted Screenplay | The Descendants | Won |
| 2011 | Toronto Film Critics Association Awards | Best Adapted Screenplay | The Descendants | Nominated |
| 2011 | Satellite Awards | Best Adapted Screenplay | The Descendants | Won |
| 2011 | San Diego Film Critics Society Awards | Best Adapted Screenplay | The Descendants | Nominated |
| 2011 | Phoenix Film Critics Society Awards | Best Adapted Screenplay | The Descendants | Nominated |
| 2011 | Southeastern Film Critics Association Awards | Best Adapted Screenplay | The Descendants | Won |
| 2011 | Florida Film Critics Circle Awards | Best Adapted Screenplay | The Descendants | Won |
| 2011 | Dallas-Fort Worth Film Critics Association Awards | Best Adapted Screenplay | The Descendants | Won |
| 2011 | Chicago Film Critics Association Awards | Best Adapted Screenplay | The Descendants | Nominated |
| 2011 | National Board of Review | Best Adapted Screenplay | The Descendants | Won |
| 2012 | Writers Guild of America | Best Adapted Screenplay | The Descendants | Won |
| 2012 | Vancouver Film Critics Circle | Best Adapted Screenplay | The Descendants | Nominated |
| 2012 | USC Scripter Award | Best Adapted Screenplay | The Descendants | Won |
| 2012 | Online Film Critics Society Awards | Best Adapted Screenplay | The Descendants | Nominated |
| 2012 | London Critics Circle Film Awards | Best Adapted Screenplay | The Descendants | Nominated |
| 2012 | Independent Spirit Awards | Best Adapted Screenplay | The Descendants | Won |
| 2012 | Golden Globe | Best Adapted Screenplay | The Descendants | Nominated |
| 2012 | Central Ohio Film Critics Association | Best Adapted Screenplay | The Descendants | Nominated |
| 2012 | Broadcast Film Critics Association Awards | Best Adapted Screenplay | The Descendants | Nominated |
| 2012 | BAFTA Awards | Best Adapted Screenplay | The Descendants | Nominated |
| 2012 | Australian Film Institute | Best Adapted Screenplay | The Descendants | Nominated |
| 2012 | Academy Award | Best Adapted Screenplay | The Descendants | Won |
| 2013 | Newport Beach Film Festival Audience Award | Feature Film | The Way Way Back | Won |
| 2013 | Filmfest Hamburg | Art Cinema Award | The Way Way Back | Nominated |
| 2014 | St. Louis Film Critics Association | Best Comedy | The Way Way Back | Nominated |
| 2014 | Critics' Choice Movie Awards | Best Comedy | The Way Way Back | Nominated |
| 2022 | Peabody Awards | Entertainment | Our Flag Means Death | Nominated |
