= Kevin Heffernan (actor) =

American actor and comedian (born 1968)

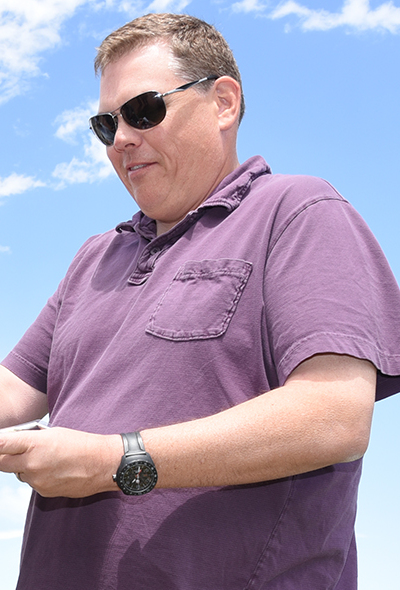
- Heffernan signs autographs during a visit to Cheyenne Mountain Air Force Station in 2016.
- Born: May 25, 1968 (age 58); West Haven, Connecticut, U.S.
- Education: Colgate University (BA); Brooklyn Law School (JD)
- Occupations: Actor, director, producer, writer, comedian
- Years active: 1996–present

Kevin Heffernan (born May 25, 1968) is an American actor, filmmaker, and member of the Broken Lizard comedy group.

== Life and career ==
Heffernan was born in West Haven, Connecticut. His mother, Catheryn Jane (née Eiby), is the West Haven treasurer, and his father, Eugene Michael Heffernan, worked as a probate judge. His paternal grandfather, William J. Heffernan, was mayor of West Haven.

Heffernan is a graduate of Fairfield College Preparatory School and later Colgate University, the latter where he was a part of comedy group Charred Goosebeak with other members of the Beta Theta Pi fraternity. This group would stay together outside college, and become the group Broken Lizard. Heffernan is a graduate of Brooklyn Law School, and passed the bar exams in Connecticut and New York, but does not practice law.

Instead, he and the other members of Broken Lizard spent several years to make the film Super Troopers. They took it to the Sundance Film Festival, and sold the distribution rights to Fox Searchlight Pictures for $3.25 million. It grossed $23.1 million when released in 2001, and Heffernan's comedy acting career was made. Heffernan is best known for his role of Vermont State Trooper Rod Farva in Super Troopers and its 2018 sequel Super Troopers 2.

He works especially closely with fellow Broken Lizard member Steve Lemme. They do a two-man touring standup comedy show, a podcast, a web series, and a Netflix special.

Heffernan also played Landfill and Gil in Beerfest, and co-starred in the Dukes of Hazzard film as "Sheev".

He has also appeared on How I Met Your Mother (ep. "I'm Not That Guy"), Curb Your Enthusiasm, Veep, Arrested Development, Agent Carter, and in two episodes of season 5 of The Goldbergs, as Ms.Torg's favorite "chalk throwing" teacher.

From 2019 to 2023, he portrayed Chief Terry McConky in the TruTV cable television firefighter comedy series Tacoma FD. This series launched in March 2019, and was partly based on the stories of Heffernan's cousin William "Bill" Heffernan , who is the historian for the West Haven Fire Department, a Connecticut State legislator and a consultant for the program. In February 2024, TruTV canceled the series after four seasons.

== Filmography ==
Year	Title	Role	Notes
1994	The Tinfoil Monkey Agenda	Lieutenant Henry Fowler / Large Green Bay Packer Fan	
1996	Puddle Cruiser	Grogan	With Broken Lizard
1998	No Looking Back	Guy in Diner #1	
1999	Big Helium Dog	Phil	
2001	Super Troopers	Rod Farva	Also editor With Broken Lizard
2004	Club Dread	Lars Bronkhorst	With Broken Lizard
2004	The 100 Scariest Movie Moments	Himself	
2005	Sky High	Ron Wilson	
2005	The Dukes of Hazzard	Sheev	
2006	Preaching to the Choir	Amish Man	Also screenwriter
2006	The Lather Effect	Pink Panty Dude	
2006	Beerfest	Landfill/Gil/Sausage Lady	With Broken Lizard
2008	Strange Wilderness	Whitaker	
2008	Management	Jed	
2009	The Slammin' Salmon	Rich Ferente	Director debut; with Broken Lizard
2012	The Babymakers	Wade	
2012	Freeloaders	Scotty the Boom Guy	
2014	Life	The Runner	Short film
2015	Super Troopers Boot Camp	Rod Farva	Short film; with Broken Lizard
2018	The Goldbergs: 1990 Something	Doc	TV movie
2018	Super Troopers 2	Rod Farva	With Broken Lizard
2018	Beerfest: Thirst for Victory	Landfill	TV movie
2018	Miss Arizona	Bigs	
2019	Airplane Mode	Gary Marshall	
2020	Fulfillment	Harold	Short film
2020	Scoob!	Bike Cop Gary	Voice debut
2020	Calls	Jerk Store Call	Short film
2023	Quasi	Duchamp Rousseau / Henri-Francoise	Also director and writer; with Broken Lizard
2026	Super Troopers 3	Rod Farva	Post-production

== Television ==
Year	Title	Role	Notes
2002	Comedy Central Canned Ham	Rod Farva	Episode: "Super Troopers"; with Broken Lizard
2005	Arrested Development	Announcer	Episode: "Sword of Destiny"
2007	Curb Your Enthusiasm	TiVo Guy	Episode: "The TiVo Guy"
2007	How I Met Your Mother	Ted Mosby Porn Star	Episode: "I'm Not That Guy"
2007	iThunes	Parking Enforcement Officer	2 episodes
2012	Veep	Fast Food Executive	Episode: "Baseball"
2012	Animal Practice	Max Ricketts	Episode: "Dr. Yamamazing"
2014	Workaholics	Officer Don Burton	Episode: "DeputyDong"
2015	Agent Carter	Madison Avenue Guy	Episode: "Now is Not the End"
2015	MOCKpocalypse	Himself	Episode: "Metal"
2015	GGN: Snoop Dogg's Double G News Network	Farva	Episode: "GGN Super Troopers"
2016	Time Traveling Bong	Donnie	2 episodes
2017	The Goldbergs	Doc	2 episodes
2019–2023	Tacoma FD	Chief Terry McConky	Main cast; also creator and executive producer
2020	Hell Den	C.H.A.Z.	Episode: "BET-C Versus the House"
2022	The Fairly OddParents: Fairly Odder	Police Chief	Episode: "The Show Off"
