= Broken Lizard =

American comedy troupe

- Notable work: Puddle Cruiser (1996); Super Troopers (2001); Club Dread (2004); Beerfest (2006); The Slammin' Salmon (2009); Super Troopers 2 (2018); Tacoma FD (2019–2023); Quasi (2023); Super Troopers 3 (2026)

Comedy career
- Years active: 1989–present
- Medium: Film and Television
- Genres: Physical comedy, Gross-out humor
- Members: Jay Chandrasekhar; Kevin Heffernan; Steve Lemme; Paul Soter; Erik Stolhanske
- Former members: Ted Griffin
- Website: www.brokenlizard.com

Broken Lizard is an American comedy troupe that consists of Jay Chandrasekhar, Kevin Heffernan, Steve Lemme, Paul Soter, and Erik Stolhanske. They collaborate on the screen-writing, acting and productions of their films, with Chandrasekhar and Heffernan being the primary directors; the team however does not have any single leader and they work collaboratively when choosing material and writing projects.

== History ==
The group formed at Colgate University in 1989 when Jay Chandrasekhar was asked by a friend and fellow student, Ira Liss, to put together a comedy show. Chandrasekhar agreed and assembled a sketch comedy troupe which included Kevin Heffernan, Steve Lemme, Paul Soter, and Erik Stolhanske, all members of the Beta Theta Pi fraternity. The team performed a combination of live stage sketches and short videos under the name "Charred Goosebeak". Charred Goosebeak continues to exist at Colgate to this day.

After graduation, the members reunited in New York City and spent the next few years performing at various clubs, mostly Greenwich Village mainstay The Duplex, under the name "Broken Lizard". The group offered various explanations of the origin of this moniker over the years, ranging from a euphemism for loss of virility to a tribute to Chandrasekhar's pet allergies. Most recently, the members admitted that Chandrasekhar simply made up the name "off the top of his head" when he had their first flyer printed. Another possible name that was discarded was "Chocolate Speedo".

Broken Lizard spent the next few years performing at clubs and college campuses. Its membership dwindled to the five current performers. By the mid-1990s, the group's interests shifted away from live material as they became more interested in filmed content. They wrote and acted in Dante's Levels of Hell, a series of interstitial shorts for Comedy Central's "Is This On?" feature.

At this time, the Broken Lizard members also made their first foray into long-form film, shooting the 30-minute 16 mm project, The Tinfoil Monkey Agenda, an absurdist media spoof that earned them a trip to the Ft. Lauderdale Film Festival, and cemented in the group's minds that they should be creating full-length feature films. Their first feature, Puddle Cruiser (1996), was filmed entirely on the campus of their alma mater, Colgate University. It premiered at the Hamptons International Film Festival, then went on to play at the Sundance Film Festival.

The group put together the script for their next feature, and first wide-release movie Super Troopers. The film, which portrays rural highway patrolmen as regular men desperate to make their jobs entertaining, was shot in 2000, and was also invited to Sundance, where raucous screenings earned the film a distribution deal from Fox Searchlight Pictures, a unit of 20th Century Fox. The movie was released in February 2002 and only enjoyed moderate theatrical success, but it eventually developed a cult following.

Fox Searchlight sponsored and distributed the group's next feature, 2004's Club Dread, a parody of slasher films that takes place at an idyllic tropical resort.

After Chandrasekhar directed The Dukes of Hazzard for Warner Bros., Broken Lizard was offered a three-year first look deal with the studio. This relationship resulted in Broken Lizard's third feature, 2006's Beerfest, about two brothers who discover an underground Oktoberfest beer-drinking Olympics and assemble a team to compete.

In late May 2010, Broken Lizard had completed their fourth feature, The Slammin' Salmon, about a group of waiters who are terrorized over the course of a busy night by their unstable boss (Michael Clarke Duncan). Heffernan directed The Slammin' Salmon.

In 2012, both Chandrasekhar and Heffernan confirmed that a sequel to Super Troopers was in the works, and that the script had been finished. In 2015, Broken Lizard had launched a crowdfunding campaign to fund filming of Super Troopers 2. On a Funemployment Radio episode May 26, 2016, Jay Chandrasekhar confirmed that a small test segment of the film has been shot and full production would start in August 2016. On August 2, 2017, Broken Lizard announced, via their website, that they had finished post-production on the movie. Super Troopers 2 was released on April 20, 2018.

In 2023, Broken Lizard released the film Quasi and announced that Super Troopers 3 would be next.

== Other projects ==
Receiving financial support from 20th Century Fox enabled Chandrasekhar to establish a career as a television director. He directed episodes of the Fox television shows Undeclared, Andy Richter Controls the Universe, Arrested Development, Oliver Beene, and Cracking Up. In addition, he directed three episodes of Psych, including the episode "Bollywood Homicide," in which he also guest starred. Chandrasekhar directed the 2005 film The Dukes of Hazzard, in which each of the members of Broken Lizard also appeared. He likewise appeared in Jackass 2 as the taxi driver in the last main sketch of the movie, performing a "prank on a prank."

Heffernan co-wrote the screenplay to the 2005 film On the One and also acted in the films Sky High and Strange Wilderness.

Lemme was a co-producer of the movies The Decade and Boxes, and also appeared in Open Water and Big Helium Dog.

Soter wrote and directed the film noir comedy film Watching the Detectives, which starred Cillian Murphy and Lucy Liu. Soter, Lemme, and Stolhanske also appeared in the film. He also directed the horror film Dark Circles.

Stolhanske acted in a number of television shows and films, including Curb Your Enthusiasm, Six Feet Under, Undeclared, and The Onion Movie. Stolhanske was also in the Plyometrics DVD that was part of the P90X program that fitness expert Tony Horton created.

Heffernan and Lemme co-created Tacoma FD for TruTV, which ran from 2019 to 2023.

== Filmography ==
- Puddle Cruiser (1996)
- Super Troopers (2001)
- Club Dread (2004)
- The Dukes of Hazzard (2005) (directed by Chandrasekhar with cameos by each of the troupe members)
- Beerfest (2006)
- The Slammin' Salmon (2009)
- Broken Lizard Stands Up (2010)
- Freeloaders (2012) (produced by Broken Lizard with cameos by each of the troupe members)
- The Babymakers (2012) (directed & produced by Chandrasekhar who appears in a supporting role along with Heffernan)
- Super Troopers 2 (2018)
- Tacoma FD (2019–2023) (Kevin Heffernan and Steve Lemme, not the Broken Lizard group)
- Quasi (2023)
- Super Troopers 3 (2026)
