= Super Troopers 2 =

- Theatrical release poster
- Directed by: Jay Chandrasekhar
- Written by: Broken Lizard
- Produced by: Richard Perello
- Starring: Jay Chandrasekhar; Kevin Heffernan; Steve Lemme; Paul Soter; Erik Stolhanske; Rob Lowe; Brian Cox
- Cinematography: Joe Collins
- Edited by: Spencer Houck
- Music by: Eagles of Death Metal
- Production companies: Broken Lizard Industries; Cataland Films
- Distributed by: Fox Searchlight Pictures
- Release date: April 20, 2018 (United States)
- Running time: 99 minutes
- Country: United States
- Language: English
- Budget: $13.5 million
- Box office: $32 million

Super Troopers 2 is a 2018 American comedy film directed by Jay Chandrasekhar. A sequel to the 2001 film Super Troopers, the film was written by and stars the Broken Lizard comedy team, made up of Chandrasekhar, Kevin Heffernan, Steve Lemme, Paul Soter and Erik Stolhanske. The plot follows the Super Troopers being called upon to set up a new Highway Patrol station when an international border dispute arises between the United States and Canada.

The film had a troubled development period as studios were skeptical that a sequel, produced over a decade after the original, would find an audience. After a successful crowdfunding campaign produced $2 million in seed money in 24 hours (and $4.7 million overall), the film was greenlit, and test filming began in the Central Massachusetts area on October 23, 2015. The film was released in the United States on April 20, 2018, by Fox Searchlight Pictures.

== Plot ==
Several years after the first film, the officers have been fired from the Spurbury Police Department after they had taken actor Fred Savage on a ride-along that resulted in his death. Farva is now a construction supervisor, with Mac and Rabbit working for him. Thorny works in logging, and Foster lives with his girlfriend and former co-worker, Spurbury Police Chief Ursula Hanson. Mac receives a call from his former boss, Captain O'Hagan, to gather the group and meet for a fishing trip in Canada.

Once the group arrives, they find that O'Hagan's intention had been for them to have a meeting with Vermont Governor Jessman. She explains that during a recent land survey, it was discovered that land in Canada was originally designated for the U.S. Canada has agreed to hand over the land, and Jessman needs to set up a police department to take over from the Royal Canadian Mounted Police in the region. She invites the group to become state troopers again, with the promise that they will become full-time officers should they succeed at this task.

At a reception for the police officers, they meet town mayor Guy Le Franc, the Canadian Mounties they will be replacing, and cultural attaché Genevieve Aubois. The Americans are received poorly by the townspeople who wish to remain Canadian. The next day, Foster and Mac accompany the Mounties on their patrol to meet the local townspeople, where they are attacked in Le Franc's strip club. Thorny and Rabbit are tasked with replacing metric road signs with their U.S. equivalent measurements, and Farva is assigned as the dispatcher.

Thorny and Rabbit encounter several young children under the influence of drugs. They ask the kids to lead them to where they found the drugs and arrive at an abandoned lake house where they encounter unmarked pills and counterfeit cell phones. The next day, the Canadian Mounties play a prank on the Vermont State Troopers by releasing a bear into their station. In retaliation, the State Troopers kidnap the Mounties and release them in the woods. They then don Mountie uniforms and attempt to discredit their Canadian counterparts by performing pranks on the people they pull over. However, their pranks are cut short when Le Franc reveals that he will use the serious crime of impersonating an officer to keep the territory from becoming American.

The State Troopers discover that they will not be given their original jobs after failing at this task, and intend to return to the United States. During a botched highway stop, Farva and Mac encounter another cache of drugs and cell phones, as well a model of gun that is illegal in the U.S. The troopers realize that these items are all more valuable in the U.S. than in Canada, and that someone has been planting these items around the town in preparation for the turnover to the U.S., to avoid being required to bring the contraband back to the border. Back at the station, Genevieve, who has been flirting with Rabbit, arrives, and the two begin to have sex, only to be attacked and carried off. The rest of the State Troopers learn about Rabbit's kidnapping by reviewing his dash-cam, and suspect the Canadian Mounties are involved.

Using a cell phone triangulator on the counterfeit phones, the State Troopers arrive at a sawmill. They encounter the Mounties, only to realize the Mounties had suspected the State Troopers as drug smugglers. Guy Le Franc reveals himself as the leader of the smuggling operation, and has captured Genevieve and Rabbit and tied them to a board placed on the saw. Genevieve reveals herself to be a double agent working for Le Franc, and the groups engage in a shootout. The State Troopers and Mounties are successful, and Rabbit is rescued. Le Franc and his employees are arrested, and Genevieve reveals that she is actually Andrea Spooner, and part of the Ontario Provincial Police and is working undercover.

Jessman arrives to congratulate the officers on their success. At a press conference, the Canadian Mounties congratulate their American counterparts and give praise for their efforts. Jessman announces that, due to the hidden contraband, the territory will remain in Canadian control for the time being, causing both nations' officers to insult each other and begin brawling once again.

In a mid-credits scene, body-cam footage is shown from the ill-fated ride along with Fred Savage. The police officers have been called to rescue a cat out of a tree. After Fred Savage learns that their job entails them calling the fire department for the rescue, he begins climbing the tree to rescue the cat himself. He falls out of the tree and manages to land safely, only to be hit and killed by the arriving firetruck.

In a post-credits scene, Farva blends his pinky toe into a smoothie and drinks it straight out of the blender, the result of losing a bet with Rabbit during the movie.

== Cast ==
State Troopers

- Jay Chandrasekhar as Senior Trooper Arcot "Thorny" Ramathorn, a veteran of the Vermont State Police who is the second-in-command of his barracks.
- Paul Soter as Trooper Carl Foster, arguably the most calm and reserved Trooper of the department.
- Steve Lemme as Trooper MacIntyre "Mac" Womack, the Trooper who enjoys pranks the most.
- Erik Stolhanske as Trooper Robbie "Rabbit" Roto, a rookie State Trooper.
- Kevin Heffernan as Trooper Rodney "Rod" Farva, a fat, loud, ill-tempered, obnoxious and arrogant radio operator and occasional patrolman.
- Brian Cox as Captain John O'Hagan, the cantankerous commander of his Vermont State Trooper barracks.

Other cast

- Rob Lowe as Guy "The Halifax Explosion" Le Franc, a former Montreal Canadiens hockey player and the current mayor of a Canadian border town in Quebec.
- Emmanuelle Chriqui as Andrea Spooner/Genevieve Aubois, a French-Canadian cultural attaché focused on relations with the U.S., who is later revealed to be an undercover Officer for Ontario Provincial Police.
- Tyler Labine as Sergeant Christophe Bellefuille, a patriotically jingoistic Canadian Mountie
- Will Sasso as Sergeant Major Roger Archambault, an obnoxious French-Canadian Mountie
- Hayes MacArthur as Staff Sergeant Major Henri Podien, an arguably calm and reserved Canadian Mountie who serves as their leader
- Damon Wayans Jr. as Trooper Wagner
- Seann William Scott as Trooper Callaghan
- Lynda Carter as Vermont Gov. Jessman
- Marisa Coughlan as Ursula Hansen, Foster's girlfriend, a dispatcher-turned-Chief of the Spurbury Police
- Paul Walter Hauser as Lonnie Laloush, an obnoxious office manager
- Jim Gaffigan as Larry Johnson, a speeding motorist previously seen in the first film
- Fred Savage as a fictionalized version of himself
- Jimmy Tatro as Lance Stonebreaker, a speeding motorist
- Clifton Collins Jr. as Bus Driver
- Bruce McCulloch as Border Officer Charles Lloyd

== Production ==
=== Crowdsourcing ===
Initially as revealed in the 2006 San Diego Comic-Con, the followup to Super Troopers was to be a prequel taking place in the 1970s and following the fathers of the main characters in the original film. Jay Chandrasekhar later told Rotten Tomatoes, "The joke is that we'll make it Super Troopers '76, set during the Bicentennial." "We'll have a little shaggier hair and mustaches...We might do it, I don't know. That movie has sort of a special place in a lot of people's hearts, so all we can do is mess it up."

However, in a January 2009 interview with MovieWeb, Paul Soter and Jay Chandrasekhar revealed that the movie would be a sequel. Chandrasekhar stated "We pick up the story essentially right where we left off. Maybe about three months later. We are all working undercover for the lumber industry. What has happened is that there are all of these eco-terrorists that are trying to blow up the lumber mills. And we are there working as security." Soter added to that: "The big picture is that we are on the Canadian border. And in reality, what has happened is that the government has found places where the markers were off, or wrong. And there are these areas of land that were thought to be Canada but are actually part of the U.S. We are enlisted to patrol this area that was always thought to be Canadian soil. But no, it is actually the United States. We are enlisted because they have to send someone there to help make it part of the U.S. territory now. We get recruited to be the Highway Patrolmen there. And we are surrounded by all of these Canadian people that aren't happy about this. We essentially have to impose U.S. law on a bunch of Canadians that aren't at all happy about it."

In November 2009, Broken Lizard revealed that they had finished three drafts of the sequel's screenplay and that independent financiers had agreed to finance the movie. They also revealed that the character of Captain O'Hagan was part of the screenplay and that actor Brian Cox was planning on returning to the role.

On March 24, 2015, Broken Lizard announced that they had received studio permission to film the sequel, but had to locate production funding themselves. Due to this requirement, Broken Lizard initiated an Indiegogo crowdfunding campaign, asking for $2 million in contributions. For the campaign Broken Lizard teamed up with Fandango to offer tickets to the movie as a potential backer reward. Broken Lizard noted that they made this decision after noticing that many other crowdfunded films left backers feeling "ripped off" as they offered no financial compensation for them to see the movie in a theater.

Just 14 hours after the funding window opened, Broken Lizard Industries had raised over 73% of the necessary funds ($1,459,446). The $2,000,000 funding goal was reached just 26 hours after the window opened but contributions continued to be added in force. Large ticket perks were offered as incentives to get this funding including tickets to a real beerfest in Chicago, a producer title in the credits ($10,000), a "director" listing ($12,500), a speaking actor role ($10,000), a trip to the ballpark with the five main actors ($15,000), and even the patrol car that will be used in the filming of the movie ($35,000) were all sold out within 12 hours of funding. This project is also, as of March 2016, #38 on the list of highest funded crowdfunding projects and is the #7 largest successfully completed Indiegogo project; its campaign was completed on April 24. The campaign raised $4.7 million for the film, and Fox Searchlight Pictures was scheduled to release the film.

=== Filming ===
On top of the raised $4.7 million, Chandrasekhar was able to collect $8 million more in private financing, and received a $2.8 million tax rebate from Massachusetts, bringing the entire production budget of the film to $13.5 million. Test filming began on October 23, 2015. On a Funemployment Radio episode May 26, 2016, Jay Chandrasekhar confirmed that a small test segment of the film has been shot. In September 2016, it was announced that Emmanuelle Chriqui, Tyler Labine, Lynda Carter, Rob Lowe, Will Sasso, and Hayes MacArthur joined the cast. Principal photography began in the Ware, Massachusetts area on September 7, 2016, and ended on October 3, 2016.

On August 2, 2017, Broken Lizard announced, via their website, that they had finished post-production on the film.

=== Music ===
Eagles of Death Metal composed the score for the film.

== Release ==
Super Troopers 2 was released by Fox Searchlight Pictures on April 20, 2018, more than 17 years after the original film premiered.

=== Home media release ===
Super Troopers 2 was released on Digital HD from Amazon Video and iTunes on July 3, 2018, and on DVD and Blu-ray on July 17, 2018.

== Reception ==
=== Box office ===
In the United States and Canada, Super Troopers 2 was released alongside I Feel Pretty and Traffik, and was originally projected to gross around $6 million from 2,038 theaters in its opening weekend. However, after making $7.9 million on its first day (including $1.35 million from Thursday night previews), weekend estimates were raised to $16 million. It went on to open to $15.2 million, finishing fourth behind A Quiet Place, Rampage and I Feel Pretty, and nearly matching the $18.5 million the original film made in its entire theatrical run. In its second weekend the film dropped 76% to $3.6 million, finishing 6th.

=== Critical response ===
On review aggregator website Rotten Tomatoes, the film holds an approval rating of 35% based on 103 reviews, and an average rating of 4.6/10. The website's critical consensus reads, "Meow that the wait for Super Troopers 2 is finally over, all but the most devoted fans mustache themselves why they waited so long for such cruel and tragic shenanigans." On Metacritic, the film has a weighted average score of 41 out of 100, based on 29 critics, indicating "mixed or average reviews". Audiences polled by CinemaScore gave the film an average grade of "B+" on an A+ to F scale.

Variety's Owen Gleiberman said the jokes in the film felt "even mustier than they did the first time" and wrote, "Super Troopers 2 is an aggressively lame and slobby comedy full of cardboard characters and in-your-face naughty jokes that feel about as dangerous as old vaudeville routines."

Conversely, The New York Times named the film an NYT Critic's Pick, with reviewer Glenn Kenny calling it "very funny indeed" and adding that "[t]he antics ... almost never fail to amuse."

== Sequel ==
Super Troopers 2 director Jay Chandrasekhar has stated that a second sequel is possible, and on July 21, 2018, Chandrasekhar announced the title, Super Troopers 3: Winter Soldiers, and that they began writing the script. As of 2022, the script was still in the drafting phase, until August 2025, when production officially started. In 2026, Searchlight released a trailer for Super Troopers 3, which was released in movie theaters on August 7, 2026.
