= Tacoma FD =

American television sitcom (2019–2023)

- Genre: Sitcom
- Created by: Kevin Heffernan; Steve Lemme
- Starring: Kevin Heffernan; Steve Lemme; Eugene Cordero; Hassie Harrison; Marcus Henderson; Gabriel Hogan; Chris Avila
- Opening theme: "Hot Blooded" by Foreigner
- Composer: Jason Akana
- Country of origin: United States
- Original language: English
- No. of seasons: 4
- No. of episodes: 49

Production
- Executive producers: Kevin Heffernan; Steve Lemme; David Miner; Greg Walter; Kyle Clark
- Editor: Frank McGrath
- Production companies: Fat Man Little Boy (seasons 1–3); Wet Mouth (season 4); 3 Arts Entertainment; Silverscreen Pictures (seasons 1–2); Broken Lizard (seasons 1–3); A24 (seasons 3–4)

Original release
- Network: truTV
- Release: March 28, 2019 – October 5, 2023

Tacoma FD is an American television sitcom set in a firehouse in Tacoma, Washington. The series premiered on March 28, 2019, on truTV. In November 2021, the series was renewed for a fourth season, premiering on July 20, 2023. In February 2024, the series was canceled after four seasons.

== Premise ==
Tacoma FD takes place in a firehouse in Tacoma, Washington. Without many fires to extinguish, the firefighters are always ready to fight fires. However, they end up tackling the less-glamorous elements of the job. Leading the firehouse crew are Chief Terry McConky and Captain Eddie Penisi.

== Cast and characters ==
=== Main cast ===
- Kevin Heffernan as Fire Chief Terrance Leslie McConky. Lucy's father, married to Eddie's sister, Vicky. "Popped" a nut saving Eddie's life
- Steve Lemme as Captain Edward Caesar Penisi, Jr. Son of Fire Commissioner Edward "Eddie" Caesar Penisi, Sr. Lucy's uncle and Vicky's brother
- Marcus Henderson as Granfield "Granny" Smith. Paramedic of A-shift.
- Eugene Cordero as Kaponko "Andy" Myawani (seasons 1–3). Ike's best friend, also works at his uncle's carpet company, decides to take a permanent position there at the beginning of season 4.
- Gabriel Hogan as Ike Crystal. Andy's best friend a dim-witted rig engineer/driver, who is a stripper on the side, and has a twin brother named, Mike.
- Hassie Harrison as Lucy McConky. Terry's daughter, formerly the rookie of A-shift until season 3, episode 2 (Hell Week).
- Christopher Avila as Andres "Andy" Mickleberry (season 4). Newest rookie of A-shift.

=== Recurring cast ===
- Heather Mazur as Vicky Penisi–McConky, Terry's wife, Lucy's mother, Eddie Jr.'s sister and Eddie Sr.'s daughter
- Kelsey Heffernan as Kelsey McConky, Terry and Vicky's daughter, Eddie Sr.'s granddaughter, Eddie Jr.'s niece and Lucy's sister
- Quinn Heffernan as Quinn McConky, Terry and Vicky's daughter, Eddie Sr.'s granddaughter, Eddie Jr.'s niece and Lucy's sister
- Suzy Nakamura as Linda Price, a councilwomen of Tacoma's city council
- Paul Soter as Wolf Boykins, a firefighter and a Certification Trainer for the Tacoma Fire Department
- Buck Heffernan as Hunter
- Alexie Gilmore as Hunter's mother
- Jamie Kaler as Captain Gerald "Jerry" Polonsky, Sr., captain of the Tacoma Police Department
- Jimmy Tatro as Sgt. Brad Shuck, Sergeant of the Tacoma Police Department
- Maria Russell as Lt. Liz Salazar, Lieutenant of the Tacoma Police Department and Andy's ex-girlfriend
- Karen Maruyama as Mrs. Myawani, Andy's "mother," later revealed to be his grandmother
- Anthea Neri Best as Kailani Myawani, Andy's "sister," later revealed to be his mother
- Nat Faxon as Frenchy, a member of the B-Shift on Station 24
- Martin Starr as Toethar
- Tina Arning as Lola Polonsky, Jerry's wife
- Jessica Lowe as Delilah
- Joe Pantoliano as Fire Commissioner Edward "Eddie" Caesar Penisi, Sr., Eddie and Vicky's father, Terry's father-in-law and Lucy's grandfather
- Jeff Pierre as Captain Tad, captain of the C-Team on Station 24
- Pierson Fode as Jan Damme, a member of the C-Team on Station 24
- Brett Davis as Shorty, a member of the C-Team on Station 24
- Jon Rudnitsky as Officer Gerald Polonsky, Jr., officer of the Tacoma Police Department
- Dexter Lumis as Dex
- David Arquette as Captain Teddy Dickosi

== Episodes ==
Season	Episodes	Originally released	
Season	Episodes	First released	Last released
1	10	March 28, 2019	May 30, 2019
2	13	March 26, 2020	September 3, 2020
3	13	September 16, 2021	December 9, 2021
4	13	July 20, 2023	October 5, 2023

=== Season 1 (2019) ===
No. overall	No. in season	Title	Directed by	Written by	Original release date	U.S. viewers (millions)
1	1	"On the Hot Seat"	Kevin Heffernan	Kevin Heffernan & Steve Lemme	March 28, 2019	0.44
2	2	"Cop Wars"	Kevin Heffernan	Kevin Heffernan & Steve Lemme	April 4, 2019	0.40
3	3	"A New Hope"	Kevin Heffernan	Kevin Heffernan & Steve Lemme	April 11, 2019	0.41
4	4	"Training Day"	Steve Lemme	Kevin Heffernan & Steve Lemme	April 18, 2019	0.39
5	5	"The B-Team"	Steve Lemme	Sivert Glarum & Michael Jamin	April 25, 2019	0.33
6	6	"Full Moon Fever"	LP	Carrie Clifford	May 2, 2019	0.33
7	7	"Old Flame"	LP	Jessica Polonsky	May 9, 2019	0.32
8	8	"Where's the Beefcake"	Alex Reid	Paul Soter	May 16, 2019	0.23
9	9	"I'm Eddie Penisi"	Alex Reid	Sivert Glarum & Michael Jamin	May 23, 2019	0.37
10	10	"Fire at the Dispensary"	Kevin Heffernan	Kevin Heffernan & Steve Lemme	May 30, 2019	0.32

=== Season 2 (2020) ===
No. overall	No. in season	Title	Directed by	Written by	Original release date	U.S. viewers (millions)
11	1	"Payday"	Kevin Heffernan	Kevin Heffernan & Steve Lemme	March 26, 2020	0.41
12	2	"Fire in Sex Town"	Kevin Heffernan	Natasha Kanury	April 2, 2020	0.30
13	3	"Whodunnit"	Kevin Heffernan	Carrie Clifford	April 9, 2020	0.35
14	4	"Lucy Wants a Friend"	Steve Lemme	Emilia Barrosse	April 16, 2020	0.28
15	5	"I'm Eddie Penisi...Sr"	Steve Lemme	Kevin Heffernan & Steve Lemme	April 23, 2020	0.32
16	6	"The C-Team"	LP	Mike Culbert & Mike Pellettieri	April 30, 2020	0.30
17	7	"Fire Choir"	LP	Sivert Glarum & Michael Jamin	July 23, 2020	0.20
18	8	"The Crying Game"	Nancy Hower	Paul Soter	July 30, 2020	0.25
19	9	"Ike and Mike"	Nancy Hower	Sivert Glarum & Michael Jamin	August 6, 2020	0.20
20	10	"Firefighter's Ball Part 1"	Steve Lemme	Kevin Heffernan & Steve Lemme	August 13, 2020	0.27
21	11	"Firefighter's Ball Part 2"	Steve Lemme	Kevin Heffernan & Steve Lemme	August 20, 2020	0.22
22	12	"To Nightmare Manor"	Kevin Heffernan	Mike Culbert & Mike Pellettieri	August 27, 2020	0.30
23	13	"A Christmas Story"	Kevin Heffernan	Paul Soter	September 3, 2020	0.19

=== Season 3 (2021) ===
No. overall	No. in season	Title	Directed by	Written by	Original release date	U.S. viewers (millions)
24	1	"Quarantine"	Kevin Heffernan	Kevin Heffernan & Steve Lemme	September 16, 2021	0.31
25	2	"Hell Week"	Kevin Heffernan	Rachelle Williams	September 23, 2021	0.26
26	3	"The Big Chill"	Steve Lemme	Mike Culbert & Mike Pellettieri	September 30, 2021	0.26
27	4	"How I Met Your Mother"	Steve Lemme	Mike Repp	October 7, 2021	0.20
28	5	"Carpet Diem"	Kevin Heffernan	Kevin Heffernan & Steve Lemme	October 14, 2021	0.24
29	6	"Rise of the Machines"	Kevin Heffernan	Paul Soter	October 21, 2021	0.22
30	7	"The Quiet Party"	Kevin Heffernan	Sivert Glarum & Michael Jamin	October 28, 2021	0.20
31	8	"Eddie the Chief"	LP	Jessica Polonsky	November 4, 2021	0.19
32	9	"Wedding Crashers"	Steve Lemme	Joanna Hausmann	November 11, 2021	0.19
33	10	"Eddie's Exes"	LP	Kevin Heffernan & Steve Lemme	November 18, 2021	0.24
34	11	"Thanksgiving"	Steve Lemme	Paul Soter	November 25, 2021	0.14
35	12	"Pickleball"	Steve Lemme	Sivert Glarum & Michael Jamin	December 2, 2021	0.22
36	13	"Fire At The Fire Station"	Kevin Heffernan	Mike Culbert & Mike Pellettieri	December 9, 2021	0.19

=== Season 4 (2023) ===
No. overall	No. in season	Title	Directed by	Written by	Original release date	U.S. viewers (millions)
37	1	"Pirate World FD"	Kevin Heffernan	Kevin Heffernan & Steve Lemme	July 20, 2023	0.155
38	2	"The Probie Imbroglio"	Kevin Heffernan	Sivert Glarum & Michael Jamin	July 27, 2023	N/A
39	3	"The Penisi Way"	Kevin Heffernan	Mike Culbert & Mike Pellettieri	August 3, 2023	N/A
40	4	"Who Gives A-Shift?"	Steve Lemme	Paul Soter	August 10, 2023	0.131
41	5	"Death Photo"	Steve Lemme	Jessica Polonsky	August 17, 2023	0.168
42	6	"Valentine's Day"	LP	Mike Repp	August 24, 2023	0.192
43	7	"Big Trouble in Little Belgium"	Steve Lemme	Kevin Heffernan & Steve Lemme	August 31, 2023	0.186
44	8	"Chicken Fight"	Steve Lemme	Kevin Heffernan, Steve Lemme & Tiffany Spring	September 7, 2023	0.158
45	9	"Gone Dutch"	LP	Kevin Heffernan, Steve Lemme & Mike Repp	September 14, 2023	0.151
46	10	"Firefighters Only"	Kevin Hefferman	Mike Culbert & Mike Pellettieri	September 21, 2023	0.075
47	11	"It's a Penisi-ful Life"	Kevin Hefferman	Paul Soter	September 28, 2023	0.106
48	12	"Kangaroo Court"	Steve Lemme	Kevin Heffernan & Steve Lemme	October 5, 2023	0.103
49	13	"Bad Blood"	Kevin Hefferman	Sivert Glarum & Michael Jamin	October 5, 2023	0.110

== Production ==
=== Development ===
On January 10, 2018, it was announced that truTV had given the production a pilot order. The series was created by Broken Lizard comedy troupe members Kevin Heffernan and Steve Lemme, who also executive produce alongside David Miner, Greg Walter, and Kyle Clark. Production companies involved with the series include 3 Arts Entertainment and Silverscreen Pictures. On May 9, 2018, it was announced that truTV had given the production a series order for a first season consisting of ten episodes. On February 11, 2019, it was announced that the series would premiere on March 28, 2019. truTV renewed the series for a second season on June 18, 2019, which premiered on March 26, 2020. On August 5, 2020, truTV renewed the series for a third season, which premiered on September 16, 2021. On November 3, 2021, truTV renewed the series for a fourth season, which premiered on July 20, 2023. On February 13, 2024, truTV cancelled the series after four seasons.

=== Casting ===
Along with the pilot order announcement, it was confirmed that Kevin Heffernan and Steve Lemme had been cast in lead roles for the series. On February 5, 2018, it was announced that Kirby Bliss Blanton, Marcus Henderson, Eugene Cordero and Gabriel Hogan had joined the main cast of the pilot. On September 19, 2018, it was reported that Blanton's role had been recast with Hassie Harrison assuming the part of Lucy McConky.

=== Filming ===
Principal photography for the series' pilot was begun in February 2018. Filming for the rest of season one began in late 2018.

== Ratings ==
=== Season 1 ===
Viewership and ratings per episode of Tacoma FD
No.	Title	Air date	Rating (18–49)	Viewers (millions)	DVR (18–49)	DVR viewers (millions)	Total (18–49)	Total viewers (millions)
1	"On the Hot Seat"	March 28, 2019	0.2	0.44	0.3	0.46	0.5	0.90
2	"Cop Wars"	April 4, 2019	0.2	0.40	0.3	0.45	0.5	0.85
3	"A New Hope"	April 11, 2019	0.2	0.41	—N/a	—N/a	—N/a	—N/a
4	"Training Day"	April 18, 2019	0.2	0.39	0.3	0.48	0.5	0.87
5	"The B-Team"	April 25, 2019	0.1	0.33	0.3	0.41	0.4	0.74
6	"Full Moon Fever"	May 2, 2019	0.2	0.33	0.2	0.40	0.4	0.73
7	"Old Flame"	May 9, 2019	0.2	0.32	0.2	0.43	0.4	0.75
8	"Where's the Beefcake"	May 16, 2019	0.1	0.23	0.2	0.34	0.3	0.56
9	"I'm Eddie Penisi"	May 23, 2019	0.2	0.37	0.3	0.47	0.5	0.84
10	"Fire at the Dispensary"	May 30, 2019	0.2	0.32	—N/a	0.38	—N/a	0.70

=== Season 2 ===
Viewership and ratings per episode of Tacoma FD
No.	Title	Air date	Rating (18–49)	Viewers (millions)	DVR (18–49)	DVR viewers (millions)	Total (18–49)	Total viewers (millions)
1	"Payday"	March 26, 2020	0.2	0.41	0.3	0.44	0.5	0.85
2	"Fire in Sex Town"	April 2, 2020	0.2	0.30	0.2	0.35	0.4	0.65
3	"Whodunnit"	April 9, 2020	0.2	0.35	0.2	0.37	0.4	0.71
4	"Lucy Wants a Friend"	April 16, 2020	0.1	0.28	0.2	0.32	0.3	0.60
5	"I'm Eddie Pensi...Sr"	April 23, 2020	0.2	0.32	0.2	0.38	0.4	0.70
6	"The C - Team"	April 30, 2020	0.2	0.30	0.2	0.39	0.4	0.69
7	"Fire Choir"	July 23, 2020	0.1	0.20	0.1	—N/a	0.2	—N/a
8	"The Crying Game"	July 30, 2020	0.1	0.25	0.1	—N/a	0.2	—N/a
9	"Ike and Mike"	August 6, 2020	0.1	0.20	0.1	—N/a	0.2	—N/a
10	"Firefighter's Ball Part 1"	August 13, 2020	0.1	0.27	TBD	TBD	TBD	TBD
11	"Firefighter's Ball Part 2"	August 20, 2020	0.1	0.22	TBD	TBD	TBD	TBD
12	"To Nightmare Manor"	August 27, 2020	0.1	0.30	TBD	TBD	TBD	TBD
13	"A Christmas Story"	September 3, 2020	0.1	0.19	TBD	TBD	TBD	TBD

=== Season 3 ===
Viewership and ratings per episode of Tacoma FD
No.	Title	Air date	Rating (18–49)	Viewers (millions)	DVR (18–49)	DVR viewers (millions)	Total (18–49)	Total viewers (millions)
1	"Quarantine"	September 16, 2021	0.1	0.31	TBD	TBD	TBD	TBD
2	"Hell Week"	September 23, 2021	0.1	0.26	TBD	TBD	TBD	TBD
3	"The Big Chill"	September 30, 2021	0.1	0.26	TBD	TBD	TBD	TBD
4	"How I Met Your Mother"	October 7, 2021	0.1	0.20	TBD	TBD	TBD	TBD
5	"Carpet Diem"	October 14, 2021	0.1	0.24	0.2	0.41	0.3	0.65
6	"Rise of the Machines"	October 21, 2021	0.1	0.22	0.2	0.41	0.3	0.63
7	"The Quiet Party"	October 28, 2021	0.1	0.20	TBD	TBD	TBD	TBD
8	"Eddie the Chief"	November 4, 2021	0.1	0.19	TBD	TBD	TBD	TBD
9	"Wedding Crashers"	November 11, 2021	0.1	0.19	TBD	TBD	TBD	TBD
10	"Eddie's Exes"	November 18, 2021	0.1	0.24	0.2	0.41	0.3	0.66
11	"Thanksgiving"	November 25, 2021	0.0	0.14	0.2	0.49	0.3	0.63
12	"Pickleball"	December 2, 2021	0.1	0.22	0.2	0.42	0.3	0.64
13	"Fire At The Fire Station"	December 9, 2021	0.1	0.19	TBD	TBD	TBD	TBD
