= Paul Soter =

American actor, writer, director, and comedian (born 1969)

- Born: August 16, 1969 (age 57); Sacramento, California, U.S.
- Occupations: Actor, director, producer, writer, comedian
- Years active: 1996–present

Paul Soter (born August 16, 1969) is an American actor, writer, and director, and one of the members of the Broken Lizard comedy group. As a child, he lived in Sacramento, Anchorage, Phoenix, and Denver. He graduated from Colgate University.

Soter serves as Creative Director at Americans for Prosparody, a satire website.

== Career ==
=== Broken Lizard ===
Soter is a founding member of the comedy troupe Broken Lizard, which has produced several films including Super Troopers, Club Dread, and Beerfest. The group collaboratively writes and performs in their productions.

=== Solo work ===
In addition to his work with Broken Lizard, Soter has directed independent films including Watching the Detectives and Dark Circles. He has also worked as a writer and producer on the television series Tacoma FD.

== Filmography ==
=== Film/Television ===
| Year | Title | Role | Notes |
|---|---|---|---|
| 1996 | Puddle Cruiser | Matt | with Broken Lizard |
| 2001 | Super Troopers | Trooper Carl Foster | with Broken Lizard |
| 2004 | Club Dread | Dave/DJ Drugs | with Broken Lizard |
| 2005 | The Dukes of Hazzard | Rick Shakely | |
| 2006 | Beerfest | Jan Wolfhouse | with Broken Lizard |
| 2009 | The Slammin' Salmon | Donnie/Dave | with Broken Lizard |
| 2012 | Freeloaders | Porn Producer | |
| 2016 | Badlands of Kain | Terry | |
| 2018 | Super Troopers 2 | Trooper Carl Foster | with Broken Lizard |
| 2019–2023 | Tacoma FD | Wolf Boykins | |
| 2023 | The Re-Education of Molly Singer | | |
| 2025 | Marshmallow | Hugh Collins | |
| 2026 | Super Troopers 3 | Trooper Carl Foster | with Broken Lizard |

=== Writer/Director/Producer ===
| Year | Title | Notes |
|---|---|---|
| 1996 | Puddle Cruiser | written by - as Broken Lizard |
| 2001 | Super Troopers | written by - as Broken Lizard |
| 2004 | Club Dread | written by - as Broken Lizard |
| 2006 | Beerfest | written by - as Broken Lizard |
| 2007 | Watching the Detectives | Director, straight to DVD |
| 2009 | The Slammin' Salmon | written by - as Broken Lizard |
| 2012 | The Babymakers | co-executive producer |
| 2013 | Dark Circles | Writer & director |
| 2015 | Quality Time | TV show, Writer, Director, and executive producer |
| 2018 | Super Troopers 2 | written by - as Broken Lizard |
| 2019 | Tacoma FD | Writer |
| 2026 | Super Troopers 3 | written by - as Broken Lizard |
