= Super Troopers =

2001 film by Jay Chandrasekhar

- Theatrical release poster
- Directed by: Jay Chandrasekhar
- Written by: Broken Lizard
- Produced by: Richard Perello
- Starring: Jay Chandrasekhar; Kevin Heffernan; Steve Lemme; Paul Soter; Erik Stolhanske; Brian Cox; Daniel von Bargen; Marisa Coughlan
- Cinematography: Joaquín Baca-Asay
- Edited by: Jacob Craycroft; Jay Chandrasekhar (Note: Credited in the poster and closing credits as "Jumbulingam"); Kevin Heffernan; George Folsey Jr. (add)
- Production companies: Jersey Shore; Cataland Films; Arpad Productions; Broken Lizard
- Distributed by: Fox Searchlight Pictures
- Release dates: January 19, 2001 (Sundance); February 15, 2002 (United States)
- Running time: 103 minutes
- Country: United States
- Language: English
- Budget: $1.5–3 million
- Box office: $23.2 million

Super Troopers is a 2001 American comedy film directed by Jay Chandrasekhar and written by and starring the Broken Lizard comedy group (Chandrasekhar, Kevin Heffernan, Steve Lemme, Paul Soter and Erik Stolhanske). Marisa Coughlan, Daniel von Bargen and Brian Cox co-star while Lynda Carter has a cameo appearance. In total, Fox Searchlight paid $3.25 million for distribution rights of the film and it grossed $23 million at the box office. A sequel, Super Troopers 2, was released on April 20, 2018, and a third film, Super Troopers 3, was released on August 7, 2026.

== Plot ==
In the fictional town of Spurbury, Vermont, four Vermont state troopers patrol a 50-mile (80 km) section of highway and have a rivalry with the local police department. Their station is at risk of closure because of low productivity. The troopers, Lieutenant Arcot "Thorny" Ramathorn, "Rabbit" Roto, "Mac" Womack, and Carl Foster, frequently play practical jokes on unsuspecting motorists and each other, rather than enforcing the law. They also target fellow trooper Rodney Farva, who has been suspended from road duty for an incident involving a school bus.

The troopers, led by Captain John O'Hagan, are called to investigate an abandoned Winnebago off the highway, only to find the Spurbury police have already arrived. Entering the RV the police and troopers discover the body of a murdered woman. Claiming the investigation, the Spurbury police chief, Bruce Grady, hopes to force the closure of the troopers' station, thereby securing increased funding for his agency. The animosity leads to a brawl between the assembled officers. The troopers observe a tattoo on the dead woman depicting a monkey. During a routine traffic stop of a semi-truck shortly after, Foster and Mac discover a large shipment of marijuana marked with stickers depicting the same monkey. The troopers suspect the dead woman and the marijuana are related. However, Grady laughs off the claim and refuses O'Hagan's suggestion that the troopers and local police cooperate on the investigation.

Foster begins a relationship with Spurbury police officer Ursula Hanson and, while attempting to have sex with her in the now-impounded Winnebago, discovers hidden bundles of marijuana, all bearing the same monkey sticker. Foster conspires with Ursula, who hates her coworkers and is stuck manning the front desk, to reveal the bust at an upcoming visit by the governor, thereby proving the troopers' suspicions and embarrassing the local police. Meanwhile, Farva is reinstated to patrol and partnered with an exasperated Thorny. However, Farva attacks a restaurant cashier and is arrested by the Spurbury police. Grady offers Farva a job with his department in exchange for information about the drug investigation, but Farva refuses. Farva is subsequently reprimanded by an infuriated O'Hagan, who re-suspends Farva.

The governor arrives in Spurbury; Thorny and Foster break into the police impound and steal the Winnebago, planning to reveal the marijuana discovered by Foster at a press conference. They barely make it in time, only to discover the marijuana has already been seized by the Spurbury police, with Chief Grady claiming credit. Foster accuses Ursula of revealing the location of the marijuana in exchange for a favorable assignment. Having nothing to show for their efforts, the state troopers expect their station to be shut down.

Back at the station, the troopers find Farva dressed in a Spurbury police uniform; Foster realizes that it was Farva, not Ursula, who betrayed the location of the marijuana. The troopers, including O'Hagan, handcuff Farva to a toilet and drunkenly vandalize Grady's house. Ursula offers to help the troopers get back at Grady and tips them off to intercept a drug-running truck. As they attempt to pursue it, the troopers encounter an escaped Farva, who holds them at gunpoint and berates them for not taking him seriously as a cop. O'Hagan intervenes and the troopers convince Farva to help them stop the drug smugglers. Following the truck to a nearby airfield, the troopers observe it being loaded with marijuana from a Canadian-marked plane. Grady and several Spurbury officers then arrive, and the troopers realize that the local police are running protection for the smugglers. After creating a diversion, the troopers brawl with the Spurbury officers and smugglers, ultimately arresting them.

Some days later, the governor sends O'Hagan a letter thanking him for his efforts, but telling him the station will still be shut down. Three months later, Thorny and Rabbit, as deliverymen, find themselves bringing a keg of beer to a party hosted by underage college students they previously arrested. As the teenagers torment the seemingly powerless ex-troopers, they remove their deliverymen's uniforms to reveal that they are Spurbury police officers, having replaced their corrupt predecessors.

== Cast ==
Vermont State Troopers

- Jay Chandrasekhar as Lieutenant Arcot "Thorny" Ramathorn, a veteran of the Vermont State Police who is the second-in-command of his barracks.
- Paul Soter as Trooper Carl Foster, arguably the most calm and reserved Trooper of the force.
- Steve Lemme as Trooper MacIntyre "Mac" Womack, the Trooper who enjoys pranks the most.
- Erik Stolhanske as Trooper Robbie "Rabbit" Roto, a rookie State Trooper.
- Kevin Heffernan as Trooper Rodney "Rod" Farva, a fat, loud, ill-tempered, obnoxious and arrogant radio operator.
- Brian Cox as Captain John O'Hagan, the cantankerous commander of his Vermont State Trooper barracks.

Spurbury Police Department

- Daniel von Bargen as Police Chief Bruce Grady, the sassy chief of the Spurbury Police
- Marisa Coughlan as Officer Ursula Hanson, an underappreciated dispatcher
- James Grace as Officer Jim Rando, a rude, ill-tempered, wisecracking police officer
- Michael Weaver as Officer Samuel Smy, an obnoxious, intellectually stupid police officer
- Dan Fey as Officer Jack Burton, an obnoxious, intellectually stupid police officer

Other characters

- Amy de Lucia as Bobbi , Thorny's girlfriend
- Jimmy Noonan as Frank Galikanokus, one of the ringleaders in the drug smuggling ring
- Jim Gaffigan as Larry Johnson, a speeding motorist
- Blanchard Ryan as Casino La Fantastique Sally
- Lynda Carter as Vermont Governor Jessman
- John Bedford Lloyd as "Mad Bill" Timber, the Mayor of Spurbury
- Charlie Finn as Ted, a wisecracking yet dim-witted employee at the fictitious Dimpus Burger.

== Production ==
Broken Lizard member Steve Lemme stated that the idea for the film came from road-tripping to various weddings in his friend and fellow BL member Jay Chandrasekhar's car and frequently getting pulled over by cops. As they were frequently under the influence of drugs, the gang began to wonder what would happen if the cops were aware of the situation and "had a sense of humor", theorizing that if they did that they "could have fucked with us so much."

The opening chase scene that ended at Thin Queen Tavern was actually The Golden Rail Ale House, located in Newburgh, New York.

The syrup-chugging scene was filmed in M's Cozy Corner located in Fishkill, New York, which has since closed.

Jay Chandrasekhar stated that they had approached Bill Murray for the role of Captain John O'Hagan. They reached out to Murray's agent and made an offer of $100,000, but Murray's agent said that he did not have Murray's phone number and that Murray would probably not accept such a small payment anyway. They instead cast Brian Cox.

== Reception ==
=== Critical response ===
On the review aggregator website Rotten Tomatoes, 36% of 91 critics' reviews are positive, with an average rating of 5.2/10. The website's consensus reads: "A more-miss -than-hit affair, Super Troopers will most likely appeal to those looking for something silly." On Metacritic, the film has a weighted average score of 48 out of 100, based on 24 critics, indicating "mixed or average reviews".

Film critic Roger Ebert awarded the film 2 1/2 stars out of 4, saying "I can't quite recommend it — it's too patched together — but I almost can; it's the kind of movie that makes you want to like it". A. O. Scott of The New York Times gave the film a negative review and opined that the film is "bad and tasteless".

=== Box office ===
Overall, the film grossed $18.5 million in the United States and a total of $23.2 million worldwide. The film would eventually become a cult film with Esquire describing it as "shaggy-dog classic for Generation Y." It made $60 million from VHS, DVD, and Blu-ray rentals, and as of December 2006 another $10.6 million from sales.

== Soundtrack ==
1. "Trooper with an Attitude" - 38 Special
2. "Geez Louise" - The Unband
3. "Shoot First, Run Like Hell" - Nashville Pussy
4. "Pass the Hatchet" - Southern Culture on the Skids
5. "Big Bear" - Steak
6. "Cheap Motels" - Southern Culture on the Skids
7. "Cannot One Night Stand It (Anymore)" - Jack Grace Band
8. "Bad Apples" - Royal Fingerbowl
9. "Bidibodi Bidibu" - The Bubbles
10. "Wrong Side of a Gun" - Nashville Pussy
11. "The Corn Rocket" - Southern Culture on the Skids
12. "King of the Mountain" - Southern Culture on the Skids
13. "Worm Farm" - Jack Grace Band
14. "Second to the Bottle" - Steak
15. "Pink Slip" - The Unband
16. "Who's the King (You Know That's Me)" - Joseph Henry

== Accolades ==
In 2001, Super Troopers won the Audience Award at the South by Southwest Film Competition. The film tied with Lady Porn (2001) and Wave Twisters (2001).

== Sequels ==
A sequel was funded partly through crowdfunding site Indiegogo, and was released in April 2018 with most of the main cast returning and released by Fox Searchlight Pictures on April 20, 2018, more than 17 years after the original film premiered.

Director Jay Chandrasekhar stated that a second sequel was possible, and on July 21, 2018, Chandrasekhar announced the title, Super Troopers 3: Winter Soldiers, and that they began writing the script. The script was still in the drafting phase in 2022, and production officially started in August 2025.
