= Super Troopers 3 =

- Theatrical release poster
- Directed by: Jay Chandrasekhar
- Written by: Broken Lizard
- Produced by: Richard Perello
- Starring: Jay Chandrasekhar; Kevin Heffernan; Steve Lemme; Paul Soter; Erik Stolhanske; Hannah Simone; Nat Faxon; Chace Crawford; Brian Cox
- Cinematography: Joe Collins
- Edited by: Spencer Houck
- Music by: Leo Birenberg; Zach Robinson
- Production companies: Broken Lizard Industries; Cataland Films
- Distributed by: Searchlight Pictures
- Release date: August 7, 2026 (United States)
- Running time: 104 minutes
- Country: United States
- Language: English
- Box office: $7.7 million

Super Troopers 3 (billed as Super Troopers 3: Farva’s Wedding, onscreen only) is a 2026 American comedy film directed by Jay Chandrasekhar. A sequel to the 2018 film Super Troopers 2, the film was written by and stars the Broken Lizard comedy team, made up of Chandrasekhar, Kevin Heffernan, Steve Lemme, Paul Soter and Erik Stolhanske.

Super Troopers 3 was released in the United States by Searchlight Pictures on August 7, 2026, it received mixed reviews from critics.

== Plot ==
The Super Troopers - Thorny, Farva, Rabbit, Mac, and Foster - gather for Farva's wedding to Thorny's sister Sarita after he saves her from a car accident two months earlier. Thorny does everything he can to show his family that Farva is not a good guy so that he can break up the wedding.

Foster and Ursula break up as well since Foster freaked out because Ursula wanted to buy a home together. Farva manages to charm Thorny and Sarita's parents, Mr. and Mrs. Makundan, to Thorny's dismay. The Troopers also have to deal with a new drug called "Canadian Crystal". Thorny decides to have his father see how unhinged Farva is at his bachelor party. During the bachelor party the Troopers' new captain, Markowski, accidentally eats Rabbit's mushroom-filled chocolates and hallucinates.

Mr. Makundan ends up having sex with strippers whom Thorny wanted Farva to hook up with and injures his leg. Mrs. Makundan forgives her husband after he confesses but tells him she will have sex with someone else to make them even. After Sarita sees what Thorny is trying to do, she disinvites him from the wedding. After the bachelor party ends Mac ends driving the stations new electric vehicle and ends up discovering that former local pot dealers, Steve and Baker Buchanan, plus their cousin Bettie, whose cover are wedding planners (they are hired for Farva's wedding) are the ones making Canadian Crystal, and the Troopers' rookie Coy is in on the scheme.

Coy knocks out Mac, and they freeze him in solid frozen syrup that has Canadian Crystal in it, but the electric car saves him since the car notices his life support is low and drives him to the wedding. Meanwhile, Thorny discovers through Farva's dashcam footage that he's the one who ran Sarita off the road. Thorny goes to stop the wedding this way, but Farva admits to what he did first. A partially melted Mac reveals the Buchanans' scheme during the ceremony and that the drugs are stashed in an elephant statue. After a gunfight, the Buchanans are arrested and Rabbit kills Coy with a knife to the chest.

Mrs. Makundan tells her husband that she wants her revenge sex to be with Captain Markowski since he jumped in front of a bullet to save her life and got shot. She gives him the Kama Sutra book and tells him to look at a specific page. Thorny begrudgingly officiates Sarita and Farva's wedding, as well as Foster and Ursula after he apologizes for freaking out about the house, and Mac and the electric car. Farva tells Thorny he's going to be an uncle, and Thorny sticks him with an EpiPen.

In a mid-credits scene, Captain O'Hagan, who has been retired and been visiting the troopers during the course of the movie, is in a tub with his girlfriend, former Governor Jessman, and reveals his real reason for constantly visiting the old station is to find $4 million he hid many years ago. A title card appears that reads, "Super Troopers 4: The Search for O'Hagan's Gold".

== Cast ==
- Jay Chandrasekhar as Senior Trooper Arcot "Thorny" Ramathorn, a veteran of the Vermont State Police who is the second-in-command of his barracks
- Kevin Heffernan as Trooper Rodney "Rod" Farva, a radio operator and occasional patrolman
- Paul Soter as Trooper Carl Foster
- Steve Lemme as Trooper MacIntyre "Mac" Womack
- Erik Stolhanske as Trooper Robbie "Rabbit" Roto
- Brian Cox as Captain John O'Hagan, retired commander of the Vermont barracks
- Marisa Coughlan as Ursula Hansen, Foster's girlfriend, a dispatcher-turned-Chief of the Spurbury Police
- Nat Faxon as Captain Todd Markowski
- Chace Crawford as Baker Buchanan
- Andrew Dismukes as Trooper Coy Burns
- Hannah Simone as Sarita Makundan, Thorny's sister
- Iqbal Theba as Dr. Makundan, Thorny's father
- Sakina Jaffrey as Mehta Makundan, Thorny's mother
- Jon Rudnitsky as Steve Buchanan
- Lisa Gilroy as Bettie
- Lynda Carter as Governor Jessman
- Rory Scovel as Truck Driver
- Will Sasso as the voice of Electric Car

== Production ==
After the release of Super Troopers 2, director Jay Chandrasekhar stated that a sequel was possible, and on July 21, 2018, Chandrasekhar announced the title, Super Troopers 3: Winter Soldiers, and that Broken Lizard began writing the script. As of 2022, the script was still in the drafting phase.

In November 2024, Chandrasekhar revealed that a third installment of Super Troopers was a possibility, and that they were having discussions with The Walt Disney Company on making the film happen.

In August 2025, the film was officially deep in development, with Kevin Heffernan, Steve Lemme, Paul Soter, Erik Stolhanske, Brian Cox, and Marisa Coughlan returning.

In September 2025, Hannah Simone and Iqbal Theba joined the cast in undisclosed roles. Sakina Jaffrey, Jon Rudnitsky, and Lisa Gilroy were added in the following month.

Leo Birenberg and Zach Robinson were revealed to be composing the score for the film in late April 2026.

Principal photography began in late August 2025, and wrapped on October 2.

== Release ==
Super Troopers 3 was released in the United States by Searchlight Pictures on August 7, 2026.

=== Home media ===
Super Troopers 3 was released for digital download on September 22, 2026. The film will be released on DVD and Blu-ray on November 3.

In the United States, Super Troopers 3 ranked No. 2 on Fandango at Home's weekly digital sales and rental chart for the week ending September 27, following its premium digital release on September 22.

== Reception ==
=== Box office ===
As of September 7, 2026, Super Troopers 3 has made $8 million at the box office.

=== Critical response ===
On the review aggregator website Rotten Tomatoes, 50% of 48 critics' reviews are positive, with an average rating of 4.9/10. The website's consensus reads: "While this lackadaisical third installment sure ain't super-duper, there's some fun to be had watching these troopers continuing to enjoy each other's company after all these years." Metacritic, which uses a weighted average, assigned the film a score of 37 out of 100, based on 9 critics, indicating "generally unfavorable" reviews. Audiences polled by CinemaScore gave the film an average grade of "B-" on an A+ to F scale, down from the previous film’s "B+".
