= Gross-out =

Shock effect technique in media and art

Gross-out is a movement in art (often with comical connotations), which is intended to shock the viewer(s) and disgust the wider audience by presenting them with controversial material (such as toilet humor and fetishes) that might be ill received by a mainstream audience.

== Cinema ==
=== Features ===
Gross-out is a subgenre of comedy films in which the makers employ humor that is willfully "tasteless" or even downright disgusting. It usually involves gratuitous nudity, unrealistic aggressiveness towards property or Schadenfreude. The movies are generally aimed at young adults, aged between 18 and 24. One boon of this genre is that it provides an inexpensive way to make a movie "edgy" and to generate media attention for it.

=== History ===
In the United States, following the abolition of the film industry's censorious Production Code and its replacement with the MPAA film rating system in the late 1960s, some filmmakers began to experiment with subversive film comedies, which explicitly dealt with taboo subjects such as sex and other bodily functions. Noteworthy examples include the 1972 midnight movie classic Pink Flamingos (in which the central character eats dog excrement) and other films by John Waters, and the 1974 sketch comedy film The Groove Tube. As these films emerged from the counterculture movement and gained a measure of audience success, they inspired more mainstream films to follow their example.

The label "gross-out movie" was first applied by the mainstream media to 1978's National Lampoon's Animal House, a comedy about the fraternity experience at US colleges. Its humor included explicit use of bodily functions (like projectile vomiting). It was a great box office success despite its limited production costs and thus started an industry trend. Since then, gross-out films increased in number, and became almost the norm for American comedy films. Some films of this genre could be aimed at teen audiences (such as Porky's, Billy Madison, American Pie and Van Wilder), while others are targeted at adult audiences (such as Caddyshack, The Nutty Professor, There's Something About Mary and Movie 43).

== Theatre ==
Gross-out theatre is practiced on stage, particularly in the Edinburgh Festival. However, it is also displayed in British theatres.

The prime examples of the above are the stage version of the contemporary drama Trainspotting by bestselling playwright and author Irvine Welsh; the controversial Tony Award-winning New York musical Urinetown by Kotis and Hollmann; the outrageous anarchistic schlockomedy (shock horror comedy) musical about a Manchester jobcentre Restart by Komedy Kollective; and performances by another United Kingdom-based act, Forced Entertainment, who devised the iconic theatrical gorefest Bloody Mess.

== Comedy ==
Tom Green used gross-out humor in The Tom Green Show and his feature film directoral debut Freddy Got Fingered. Eric Andre, who was influenced by Green, engaged in similarly provocative gross-out comedy in The Eric Andre Show.

Comedian and Saturday Night Live cast member Sarah Sherman has incorporated gross-out humor into much of her comedy. In addition to writing sketches such as Season 47's "Meatballs," she also performs surrealist body horror comedy under the stage name "Sarah Squirm."

== Art ==
American cartoonist Basil Wolverton invented his trademark "spaghetti and meatballs" style of artwork.

Various artists helped create a flourishing gross-out art scene, which began mainly in the 1990s, the most famous of which were Damien Hirst, known for encasing mutilated, rotting cattle in formaldehyde, and making art of endangered marine species such as sharks in formaldehyde tanks, and Tracey Emin, whose exhibit of an unmade bed featured used tampons, condoms and blood-stained underwear.

== Music ==
Gross-out themes are common in popular music genres, such as hip hop and hard rock, where shock value helps create notoriety. Bands include Gwar, Cannibal Corpse and Agoraphobic Nosebleed.

GG Allin was infamous for his transgressive music act, which included eating excrement, mutilating himself and attacking audience members.

Similar themes are also sometimes conveyed in music videos, such as Gross Out, a single from indie/garage rock band, The Vines.

== See also ==
- Garbage Pail Kids
- Off-color humor
- Screwball comedy film
- Teen movie
- Low culture
