= Erik Stolhanske =

American actor and comedian (born 1971)

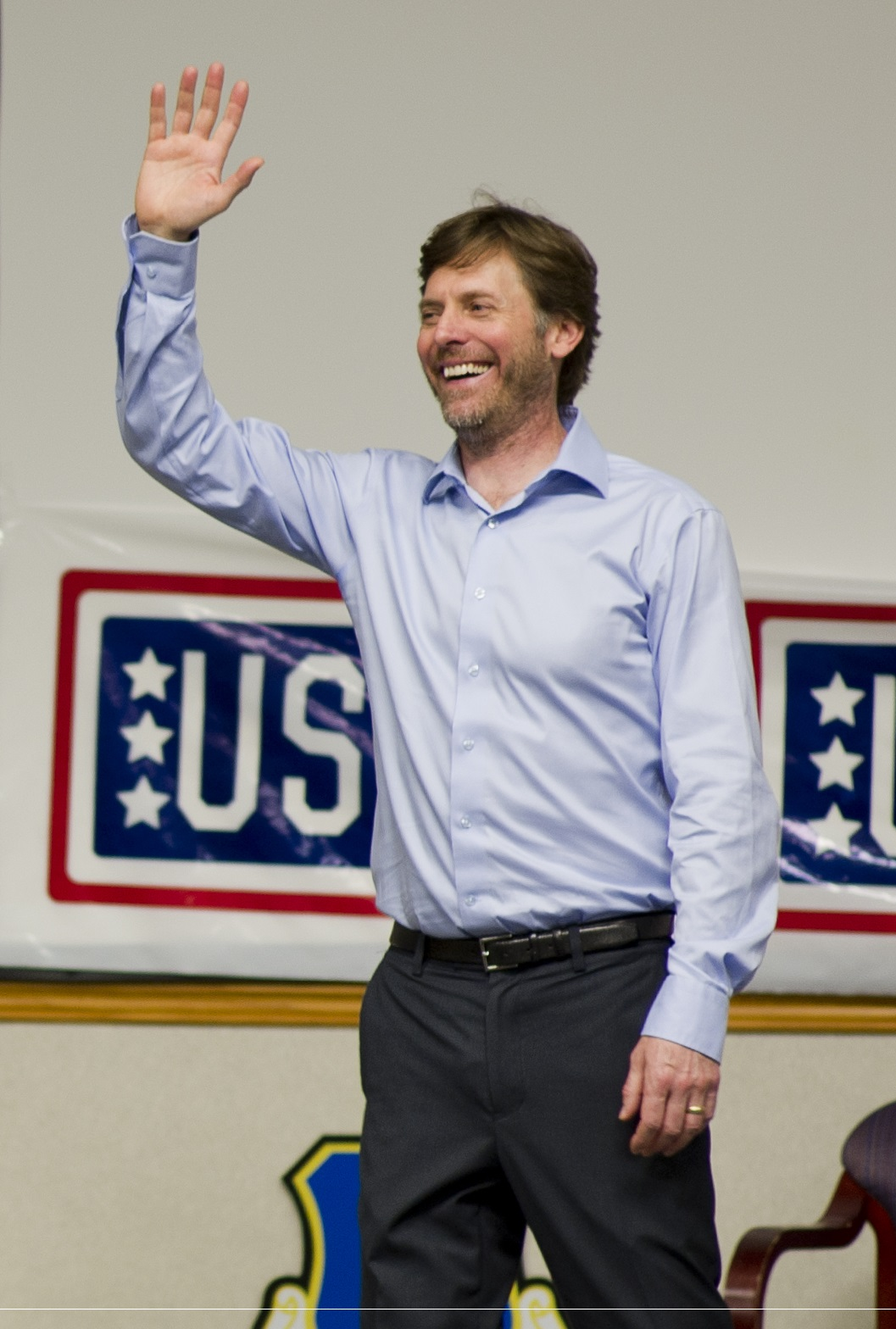
- Born: August 23, 1968 (age 58); Minneapolis, Minnesota, U.S.
- Education: Colgate University
- Notable work: Super Troopers (2001); Club Dread (2004); Beerfest (2006)

Comedy career
- Years active: 1996–present
- Medium: Film, Television, Stand-up comedy
- Genres: Physical comedy, Satire, Gross-out humor
- Website: www.brokenlizard.com

Erik J. Stolhanske (born August 23, 1968) is an American actor, writer, producer and a member of the Broken Lizard comedy group. He is best known as "Officer Rabbit" from the Super Troopers film series.

As one of the five principal members of the Broken Lizard comedy troupe, he has starred in all of the group's films, including Puddle Cruiser (1996), Club Dread (2004), Beerfest (2006), and The Slammin' Salmon (2009). Additionally, he has made cameo appearances in The Sweetest Thing (2002) and The Onion Movie (2008). On television, Stolhanske has appeared in HBO’s critically acclaimed series Curb Your Enthusiasm and Six Feet Under, as well as in the Comedy Central special Broken Lizard Stands Up.

The Broken Lizard Group continues to develop new projects, including the much-anticipated Super Troopers 3 and Quasi, which was released on Hulu on April 20, 2023.

== Early life ==
Stolhanske was born in Minneapolis, Minnesota, and has a multicultural background of Swedish, Norwegian, and Native American descent.

He attended Colgate University and graduated with a Bachelor of Arts in English. After college, Stolhanske moved to New York City, where he studied acting at the William Esper Studio and trained under Wynn Handman at The American Place Theatre.

== Career ==
Stolhanske has written, produced, and starred in all of the Broken Lizard comedies, including the latest Super Troopers 3. He has collaborated with notable actors such as Cloris Leachman, Monique, Michael Clarke Duncan, Brian Cox, Rob Lowe, and Bill Paxton.

He is also known for working alongside comedians such as Jim Gaffigan, Will Forte, and Johnny Knoxville. Additionally, he has co-written screenplays, including one with NFL star Jared Allen of the Minnesota Vikings.

An avid sports fan, Stolhanske is an occasional guest on KFAN Minnesota Sports Radio Station's top rated morning show The Power Trip.

== Film ==
The Broken Lizard Group wrote and starred in the comedy short The Tinfoil Monkey Agenda. Their first full-length film, Puddle Cruiser (1996), premiered at the Hamptons Film Festival, winning the Grand Prize for Best Film, and later screened at Sundance, SXSW, and the London International Film Festival.

Their breakthrough film, Super Troopers (2001), premiered at Sundance and earned a distribution deal with Fox Searchlight Pictures. This success was followed by Club Dread (2004), Beerfest (2006), and The Slammin’ Salmon (2009).

Stolhanske also starred in the independent comedy RockBarnes: The Emperor in You (2013), for which he won "Best Performance" at the Orlando Film Festival.

== Television ==
On television, Stolhanske appeared in HBO’s Curb Your Enthusiasm as “Sven Johnson” in the episode "The 5 Wood" and in the Six Feet Under episode "In Place of Anger". He also starred in the Comedy Central special Broken Lizard Stands Up.

== Charitable work ==
Stolhanske is an advocate for disabled veterans, collaborating with organizations like the Wounded Warrior Project to mentor and support veterans reintegrating into civilian life.
