= Steve Lemme =

American actor, writer, and producer (born 1968)

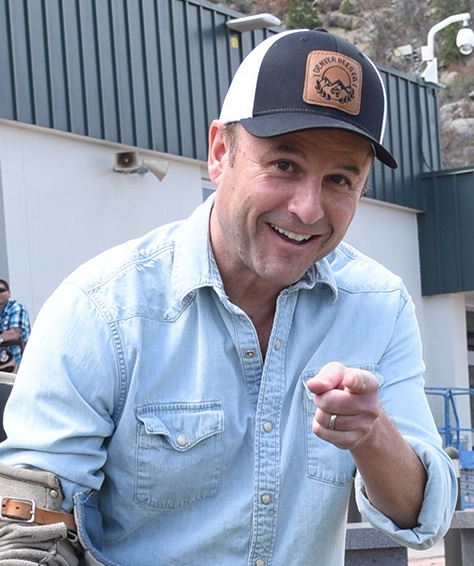
- Lemme at Cheyenne Mountain Air Force Station in 2016.
- Born: Stephen Carlos Lemme; November 13, 1968 (age 57); New York City, New York, U.S.
- Education: Colgate University
- Occupations: Actor, director, producer, writer, comedian
- Years active: 1996–present
- Spouse: Tiffany Chadderton (m. 2010)
- Children: 2

Stephen Carlos Lemme (born November 13, 1968) is an American actor, writer, and producer, and one of the members of the Broken Lizard comedy group.

== Early life ==
Lemme attended Dalton School, a high school in New York, but after one year transferred to Fountain Valley School of Colorado, graduating in 1987 (in 2017 he was inducted into the Fountain View School Arts Guild). He attended Colgate University and was a member of the Beta Theta Pi fraternity. Before leaving Colgate, he was part of Charred Goosebeak, a comedy troupe with the future members of Broken Lizard.

His father is originally from Argentina. Through his mother's side, Lemme is of Puerto Rican and French descent. As a child, Lemme developed polio as a result of a very rare side effect of a vaccination against the disease, which resulted in the decay of his right calf muscle.

== Filmography ==
Year	Title	Role	Notes
1996	Puddle Cruiser	Felix Bean	with Broken Lizard
2001	Super Troopers	State Trooper MacIntyre "Mac" Womack	with Broken Lizard
2003	Open Water	cameo	uncredited
2004	Club Dread	Juan	with Broken Lizard
2004	The 100 Scariest Movie Moments	Himself	Television special
2005	The Dukes of Hazzard	Jimmy	with Broken Lizard
2006	Beerfest	Fink	with Broken Lizard
2008	The Brooklyn Heist	FBI Director	
2009	The Slammin' Salmon	Connor	with Broken Lizard
2012	The Babymakers		with Broken Lizard
2018	Super Troopers 2	MacIntyre "Mac" Womack	with Broken Lizard
2019 - 2023	Tacoma FD	Captain Eddie Penisi Jr.	with part of Broken Lizard
2023	Quasi	Quasi/Jester	with Broken Lizard
2026	Super Troopers 3	MacIntyre "Mac" Womack	with Broken Lizard
