= Dave Shalansky =

American actor

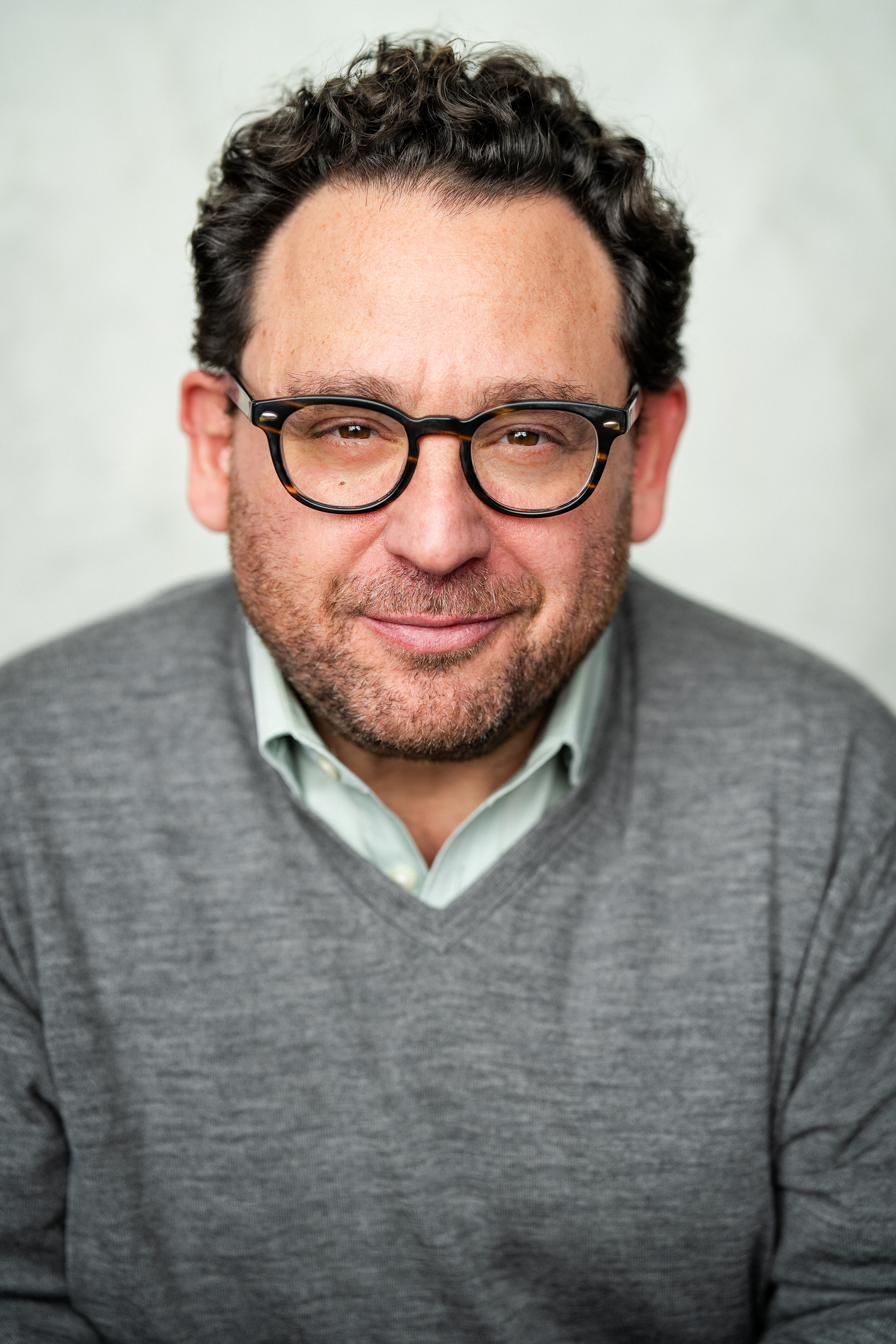
- Shalansky in 2026
- Born: Warwick, Rhode Island
- Education: Boston University (BFA)
- Occupation: Actor
- Years active: 1996-present
- Spouse: Cassandra Shalansky (m. 2012)
- Children: 1

Dave Shalansky is an American actor, writer, and director, known for his role as Harry on Gilmore Girls. His television credits include Grey's Anatomy, The Offer, Law & Order: Special Victims Unit, and FBI: Most Wanted. His film work includes Rosemead and the short film The Missing Peace, written and directed by Michael Raymond-James. In 2026, Shalansky made his directorial debut with the dark comedy short film Dirt Down.

== Early life and education ==
Shalansky was born and raised in Warwick, Rhode Island, in a Reform Jewish family. He is the son of Leonard "Len" and Ruby Shalansky. His father was a fine artist and illustrator who studied at Cooper Union and Pratt Institute in New York City. His artwork appeared on several Hasbro toys during the 1970s, including the Weeble. His mother worked as an elementary school teacher and later served as executive director of Temple Beth-El (Providence, Rhode Island).

Shalansky earned a BFA in acting from Boston University. He later studied improv comedy at the Upright Citizens Brigade in Los Angeles and trained in the Meisner technique with acting teacher Sandy Marshall.

== Career ==
After graduating from Boston University, Shalansky moved to New York City, where he worked in television commercials and in New York and regional theater. In 1997, he appeared in a production of Balm in Gilead. He moved to Los Angeles in 2003 and subsequently began appearing regularly in television and film. Among his early television roles was Harry on Gilmore Girls.

In October 2016, Shalansky participated in a staged reading of the screenplay Good Will Hunting at the Skirball Center for the Performing Arts in New York City. The cast included Matt Damon, Ben Affleck, John Krasinski, Emily Blunt, Daveed Diggs, Tom McCarthy, Keegan-Michael Key, and Margo Martindale.

Shalansky had a recurring guest role on Grey's Anatomy from 2016 to 2017. He later appeared in Law & Order: Special Victims Unit and FBI: Most Wanted. In 2022, he portrayed Henry Kissinger in the Paramount+ limited series The Offer.

In 2023, Shalansky made his Off-Broadway debut in King of the Jews, Leslie Epstein's stage adaptation of his 1979 novel of the same name.

Shalansky also appeared in The Missing Peace, a short film written and directed by Michael Raymond-James and executive produced by Jason Momoa. The film received Best Short Film and Best Acting Ensemble at the 2024 Indie Short Fest in Los Angeles and was selected for the New York Short Film Festival.

In 2025, Shalansky appeared as Principal Stephens in the feature film Rosemead (film), starring Lucy Liu.

In 2026, Shalansky made his directorial debut with the dark comedy short film Dirt Down, written by Barbara Moreno. Shalansky also received an additional writing credit on the film.

As a writer, Shalansky has written his first feature-length screenplay, a comedy-drama currently in development.

Shalansky has also worked as a drummer in rock and power-pop bands in New York and Los Angeles, including Nice Guy Eddie with guitarist Chris Jackson and bassist Robbie Rist.

== Personal Life ==
Shalansky resides in New York City. He and his wife, Cassandra, married in 2012 and they have one child. Cassandra serves as chief of staff to the president of Lincoln Center for the Performing Arts.

== Filmography ==
=== Film ===
Year	Title	Role	Notes
2006	Idol	The Agent	
2009	According to Greta	Cable Guy	
2012	Divorce Invitation	Victor	
2013	How Sweet It Is	Rogers	
2015	Midnight Sex Run	Jeff	
2017	Doobious Sources	Mr. X	
2018	The Betrothed	Jim	Short Film
2018	The Small	Graham	Short Film
2019	Others	Ted	Short Film
2022	My Cricket and Me	Uncle Dave	
2023	A Killer Romance	Jerry	
2023	The Missing Peace	Ben Jacobs	Award Winning Short Film
2024	Rosemead (film)	Principal Stephens	
2024	Double Happiness	Rabbi Ben	Short Film
2026	Dirt Down	Director, Co-writer	Short Film
2026	Coming Up Next	Writer	In Development

=== Television ===
Year	Title	Role	Notes
2004	Six Feet Under	Male Robber	Episode: "Terror Starts at Home"
2005	NCIS	Delivery Man	Episode: "The Meat Puzzle"
2005	Entourage	Nerd #6	Episode: "I Love You Too"
2005	Gilmore Girls	Harry	3 episodes
2006	E-Ring	Ricky	Episode: "Friends and Enemies"
2006	Freddie	Todd	Episode: "Two Times a Lady"
2006	Help Me Help You	Naked Dude #2	Episode: "Pink Freud"
2007	ER	Mr. Saltzman	Episode: "The Honeymoon Is Over"
2008	CSI: Crime Scene Investigation	Tim O'Shea	Episode: "Grissom's Divine Comedy"
2008	Without a Trace	Curtis	Episode: "A Dollar and a Dream"
2008	Bones	Joe	Episode: "The Man in the Outhouse"
2009	Curb Your Enthusiasm	Norm's Son	Episode: "The Black Swan"
2010	Dark Blue	Steve	Episode: "High Rollers"
2011	Lie to Me	Harvey	Episode: "Fun House"
2011	From Rags to Reuben	Gordon	Television film
2011	Let It Go Already	Max	Miniseries
2012	Castle	Tech #1	Episode: "Pandora"
2012	Ringer	Accountant	Episode: "P.S. You're an Idiot"
2012	Hollywood Heights	Mr. Stephens	2 episodes
2013	Fitz and Slade	Fitz	Television film
2013	Southland	Lucky Barnes	Episode: "Hats and Bats"
2013	Perception	Kurt Simpson	Episode: "Caleidoscope"
2013	Firsts	Dave	3 episodes
2013	Mob City	Cop #3	Episode: "Oxpecker"
2014	Legends	Doorman	Episode: "Quicksand"
2014	Newsreaders	Best Man Mike	Episode: "Roswell, New Mexico; Skip Goes to a Wedding"
2015	Nurse Jackie	Rick	Episode: "Godfathering"
2015	The Mysteries of Laura	William Davis	Episode: "The Mystery of the Ghost in the Machine"
2016	So, Then Tell Me	Jordan	4 episodes
2016	Vinyl	Stuart Blume	Episode: "The King and I"
2016	Divorce	Brad Zimmer	Episode: "Another Party"
2016, 2017	Grey's Anatomy	Jeremy	2 episodes
2017	Famous in Love	Dustin	Episode: "Prelude to a Diss"
2019	How to Get Away with Murder	Seth Keough	Episode: "Don't Go Dark on Me"
2019	Elementary	Tony	Episode: "The Further Adventures"
2020	Law & Order: SVU	Eddie Klein	Episode: "I Deserve Some Loving Too"
2020	Big Dogs	Agent Gilliard	3 episodes
2020–2022	Naysayer	Austin	10 episodes
2022	The Offer	Henry Kissinger	Episode: "Brains and Balls"
2022	Law & Order: SVU	Ethan Schmidt	Episode: "Controlled Burn"
2023	FBI: Most Wanted	Shawn	Episode: "Wanted: America"

=== Video games ===
Year	Title	Role	Notes
2011	Super Star Kartz	B.O.B.	
