= Henry LeBlanc =

American actor

Henry LeBlanc is an American actor. He has credits including Scrubs, Law & Order and Everybody Loves Raymond. He also frequently appeared on the Jay Leno Show. In addition, he teaches an acting course at UCLA Extension. In 2006, he starred as Jimmy, a nondescript middle manager in the film Resislience.

== Filmography ==
=== Film ===
Year	Title	Role	Notes
1996	West New York	Bill	
2006	Resilience	Jimmy	
2007	Naked Under Heaven	Victor	
2010	The Penthouse	Literary Agent	
2011	The Custom Mary	Paul Sr.	
2011	Reckless	Detective	
2011	Horrorween	Uncle Henry	
2012	Mont Reve	Osvaldo della Riva	
2013	Blood Type: Unknown	George Landale	
2014	The Activist	The Senator	
2015	Reset	Louis	
2016	Fantastic	Donald	
2016	I Love You Both	Dean	
2016	After the Rain	Steve	
2016	Beyond the Gates	Bob Hardesty	
2017	Doobious Sources	Mayor Jessup	
2017	The Lay of LaLa Land	Mr. Gallagher	
2018	Food for Thought	Henry	
2019	The Long Way	Sam's Dad	
2019	2nd Chance for Christmas	Doug	
2021	The Disappearance of Mrs. Wu	Local Sheriff	

=== Television ===
Year	Title	Role	Notes
1998	ER	Bartender	Episode: "Family Practice"
2000	The Practice	Detective Foster	Episode: "Checkmates"
2000	Boston Public	Laurence Holt	Episode: "Chapter Seven"
2000	JAG	Captain Jones	Episode: "Family Secrets"
2000	Everybody Loves Raymond	Board Member	Episode: "Homework"
2003	24	Officer Brooks	Episode: "Day 3: 6:00 p.m.-7:00 p.m."
2004	Strong Medicine	Augustus	Episode: "Weights and Measures"
2004	Judging Amy	Thomas Massante	Episode: "Roadhouse Blues"
2006	Scrubs	Eric McNair	Episode: "His Story III"
2007–2008	The Bold and the Beautiful	Minister	6 episodes
2008	Danny Fricke	Detective McCoy	Television film
2008–2014	The Tonight Show with Jay Leno	Various characters	35 episodes
2011	The Wankers	Narrator	Episode: "Reluctantly Related"
2012	Chuzhoe litso	TV Host	Episode #1.5
2012	Far from the Tree	Nick	Episode: "Poker Night"
2013	Mad Men	Emcee	Episode: "The Flood"
2014	Winners	Club Manager	Episode: "Big Win"
2014	Lost Angeles	Casting Director	Episode: "Pilot"
2015	CSI: Cyber	Warden	Episode: "Crowd Sourced"
2015	Deadball	Jerry Easton	Episode: "Pilot"
2016	Agents of S.H.I.E.L.D.	Mourner	Episode: "Paradise Lost"
2017	FANtasies	Father	Episode: "Meet Mikey"
2017	Deadly Vows	Stuart Dillon	Television film
2017	Tosh.0	Tosh's Father	Episode: "ASMR Thanksgiving"
2018	American Crime Story	Older Barfly / Older Gay Man	3 episodes
2018	Deadly Shores	Samuel	Television film
2020	Perry Mason	Reformed Radiant	2 episodes
