= Bojack =

Bojack may refer to:

- BoJack Horseman, an American animated television series
  - BoJack Horseman (character), the protagonist and title character of the television series
- Dragon Ball Z: Bojack Unbound, a 1993 Japanese animated film
- Paul Bojack, American film director and writer
