= Rhythm of Destiny =

1992 Hong Kong film by Andrew Lau

- Film poster
- Traditional Chinese: 伴我縱橫
- Simplified Chinese: 伴我纵横
- Hanyu Pinyin: Bàn Wǒ Zòng Héng
- Jyutping: Bun6 Ngo2 Zung3 Waang4
- Directed by: Andrew Lau
- Screenplay by: James Fung; Chan Po-sun
- Produced by: Danny Lee
- Starring: Danny Lee; Aaron Kwok; Sharla Cheung
- Cinematography: Tony Miu
- Edited by: Chan Kei-hop
- Music by: Philip Chan
- Production company: Magnum Films
- Distributed by: Golden Princess Amusement
- Release date: 2 April 1992
- Running time: 93 minutes
- Country: Hong Kong
- Language: Cantonese
- Box office: HK$7,775,386

Rhythm of Destiny is a 1992 Hong Kong drama film directed by Andrew Lau, produced by and starring Danny Lee as a criminal who decides to retire and take straight path. However, during an attempt to help his younger brother's (Aaron Kwok) singing career, he gets framed and convicted once again.

== Plot ==
Lee Ka-yin (Danny Lee), nicknamed Bee, a diamond smuggler and former triad member and ex-con, who has been imprisoned four times in the past, arrives in Taiwan for a business deal with the Taiwanese triad leader, Hark (Blackie Ko). During the trade, Hark suggests Bee that he smuggle cocaine, which Bee refuses. When Hark takes it as a joke, Bee pulls a gun on Hark, while one of Hark's henchman attempt to attack Bee and his underling, Kwan (Felix Lok), but Bee slices Hark's henchman with a sword. After the trade, Bee tells Kwan he wants to go straight and leave his criminal life, while Kwan also longs to return to Hong Kong after hiding in Taiwan for three years due to an assault charge. Bee returns to Hong Kong and gives Kwan some cash to illegally enter Hong Kong by boat.

Bee's younger brother, Kevin (Aaron Kwok) is a college student studying music and dance, who aspires to be a singer. When Bee returns home, Kevin is delighted to see him except his mother (Lisa Chiao Chiao), because of his criminal past and proceeds to kick him out of the house. Bee assures his mother that he has left the criminal life and they move into a 1,400 square feet condo, he bought for his family.

Bee then reconnects with his lover Hung (Sharla Cheung), a pub hostess. There, he also reconnects with Kwan and Superman (Shing Fui-On). Hung suggests Bee that he acquire a nightclub from the owner, who is ready to emigrate, where Superman appoints himself as manager. Kevin also arrives at the pub where he works as a part-time singer and performs on stage but Bee gets in an argument with the rowdy patrons for being too loud. Kevin attempts to break up the argument but was punched and Bee attacks the patrons aided by Kwan and Superman.

At school, Kevin is persuaded by his classmates to participate in a singing contest. There, he also witnesses classmate Donna (Lucy Liu) during a dance rehearsal and asks her out afterwards. Bee then meets with Uncle Kau (Wu Ma) to lend money for acquiring the nightclub mentioned to him by Hung and mortgages his condo to Kau for an extra funds as well.

Kevin auditions for the singing contest and gets selected. Bee, Superman and Kwan march in to the office of Yip Hon-leung, one of the judges of the singing contest and attempt to bribe him for Kevin to win. Bee, Hung, Superman and Kwan arrive to the singing contest to support Kevin, who ends up losing. Hung, Superman and Kwan assaults Yip while Bee attempts to stop them and Kevin gets arrested for assault and bribery. Bee admits to the charges and gets convicted while Kevin is freed. Officer Wong (Parkman Wong) orders his subordinates to raid Bee's nightclub, where they find a bag of cocaine hidden in his office, by Kwan. Consequently, Bee is charged with drug possession along with assault and bribery, which causes his mother to faint in court. She eventually dies in the hospital and Bee pleads with Officer Wong to allow him to attend his mother's funeral, where Kevin blames him for the death of their mother. Afterwards, Bee pleads guilty to his crimes and is sentenced for 2 years and 9 months of imprisonment, while his condo is seized by the court.

During this depressing moment for Kevin, he is approached with a contract by record producer Peter Lai, who was one of the judges of the singing contest. Kevin's singing career takes off during Bee's time in prison and Hung visits him with a photo book of Kevin. After his release, Bee reunites with Hung and Superman, who has become a cleaner due to huge debts. Bee and Hung attempt to visit Kevin in a birthday party with his fans, but Lai stops them in order to not affect his career and Bee leaves a gift of a necklace of a Christian cross. When Lai hands it to Kevin, he rushed out to see his brother who had left. Later, Hung gives Bee a ticket to Kevin's upcoming concert held in Taiwan.

Meanwhile, Kwan, who is hiding in Taiwan for framing Bee, owes a huge debt to Hark. As Hark is about to chop his fingers off, Kwan then suggests Hark to kidnap Kevin in order to clear his debts. Bee attends Kevin's concert in Taiwan where his final song is dedicated to his brother. Kevin spots Bee at the audience when he throws a coin on stage. Afterwards, Bee goes backstage to see his brother and sees Kwan kidnapping Kevin. Bee saves his brother and kills Kwan with a samurai sword, before Hark arrives and stabs Bee. Kevin then kills Hark and his henchmen and Bee dies in Kevin's arms.

== Cast ==
- Danny Lee as Lee Ka-yin (李嘉賢) / Bee (阿B)
- Aaron Kwok as Kevin Lee (李嘉華) / Dee (阿Dee)
- Sharla Cheung as Hung (阿紅)
- Shing Fui-On as Superman (超人)
- Wu Ma as Uncle Kau (九叔)
- Blackie Ko as Hark (克哥)
- Lisa Chiao Chiao as Bee and Kevin's mother
- Felix Lok as Chan Kwan (陳坤)
- Lucy Liu as Donna
- Peter Lai as himself
- Yip Hon-leung as himself
- Parkman Wong as Officer Wong (王Sir)
- James Ha as Hark's thug
- Chan Chi-fai as Pub guest fighting Bee
- Ricky Wong as Guest of Bee's nightclub
- Lam Ching as himself
- Yu Mo-lin as Madam Mui (梅姑)
- Simon Lui as Contest emcee
- Ng Kwok-kin as Leung
- Jacky Cheung Chun-hung as Hark's thug
- Lam Kwok-kit as Pub guest fighting Bee
- Joe Chu as Pub guest fighting Bee
- Diego Swing as Father Ko (高神父)
- Philip Chan as himself
- Law Shu-kei as Judge
- Eric Kei as Policeman
- John Wakefield as Attorney
- Hung Yan-yan as Hark's thug
- Kong Foo-keung as Hark's thug
- King Kong Lam as Student
- Cash Chin as Judicial officer
- Choi Kwok-keung as Thug
- Yu Ming-hin as Policeman
- Tam Kon-chung
- Chu Tat-kwong
- Dave Lam

== Music ==
Song	Composer	Lyricist	Singer	Notes
After All, Who Can Tell Me (到底誰能告訴我)	Yutaka Ozaki	Chang Fang-lu	Aaron Kwok	Theme song
Farewell Kiss During Midnight (午夜的吻別)	Hsu Chia-liang	Chiang Tung-liang	Aaron Kwok	Insert theme
Heart Breaker	Klarmann/Weber	Fred Chen	Aaron Kwok	Insert theme
I Do Not Admit Defeat (我不認輸)	Andy Goldnark, Steve Kipner	Fred Chen	Aaron Kwok	Insert theme
Should I Quietly Walk Away (我是不是該安靜的走開)	Chen Hsiu-nan	Chang Fang-lu	Aaron Kwok	Insert theme
Say Love If You Like (喜歡就說愛)	Ricky Ho	He Hou-hua	Aaron Kwok	Insert theme
I Give You All My Love (我給你全部的愛)	Wang Yi-ping	Lin Mei-hsing	Aaron Kwok	Insert theme

== Production notes ==
- Rhythm of Destiny featured the big-screen debut of American actress Lucy Liu.

== Reception ==
=== Critical reception ===
Rhythm of Destiny earned a score of 6.9/10 stars on the Chinese media rating site, Douban.

=== Box office ===
The film grossed a total of HK$7,775,386 at the Hong Kong box office during its theatrical run from 2 to 25 April, 1992.

== See also ==
- Aaron Kwok filmography
