= Magic Wonderland =

- Directed by: Wu Jianrong; Fang Lei
- Starring: Yi Yi; Ge Yuying; Yang Ying; Ling Juan; Zhang Lu
- Release date: May 30, 2014
- Running time: 90 minutes
- Country: China
- Language: Mandarin
- Box office: US$3.06 million

Magic Wonderland (Chinese: 魔幻仙踪) is a 2014 Chinese animated fantasy adventure film directed by Wu Jianrong and Fang Lei.

== Plot ==
A baby princess named Ocean is sent away from the North Pole by her mother because of the tyranny of the magma dragon who controls the volcano. The next twelve years, Princess Ocean lives on a local island and encounters a transforming polar bear whom she names Roly Poly. And she talks to a duo of little fish. While encountering the pirates, she meets an inventor named Momo. Their plan is to subdue and defeat the magma dragon.

== Cast ==
=== English version ===
- Lucy Liu as Princess Ocean
- Grey DeLisle as Little Roly Poly
- Denis Leary as Big Roly Poly

=== Chinese version ===
- Lucy Liu
- Yi Yi
- Ge Yuying
- Yang Ying
- Ling Juan
- Zhang Lu

== Related TV series ==
This contains the following episodes:

Season 1

1. The Birth of the Magic Globe
2. The Winner of the Fish Race
3. The Magic Amulet
4. The Pirates
5. The Escape
6. Ocean's Footprints
7. Lurking Danger
8. Life on the Pirate Ship
9. The Secret Plan
10. Mysteries
11. Castaway
12. Mystika - The Dangerous One
13. The Journey to the Celestial City

Season 2

1. The Unexpected Happens
2. The Darkest Day
3. Danger Awaits
4. The Maze
5. Malcolm the Giant Child
6. The Mysterious Trench
7. A Light in the Dark
8. Malcolm Takes on the Demon
9. The Lost Dragon
10. The Snail Fields
11. The Gate at the Center of the Earth
12. A Strong Enemy
13. The Wonderland

== Reception ==
The film has grossed US$3.06 million at the Chinese box office.
