= Watching the Detectives (film) =

2007 film by Paul Soter

- Promotional poster
- Directed by: Paul Soter
- Written by: Paul Soter
- Produced by: Celine Rattray; Daniela Taplin Lundberg; Galt Niederhoffer
- Starring: Cillian Murphy; Lucy Liu
- Cinematography: Christophe Lanzenberg
- Edited by: Jeff W. Canavan
- Music by: Nathan Barr
- Production company: Plum Pictures
- Distributed by: Peace Arch Entertainment
- Release dates: May 1, 2007 (Tribeca); August 12, 2008 (United States)
- Running time: 93 minutes
- Country: United States
- Language: English
- Budget: $2 million
- Box office: $15,006

Watching the Detectives is a 2007 American romantic comedy film written and directed by Paul Soter in his feature directorial debut. The film stars Cillian Murphy as the film geek owner of an independent video rental store whose life is upended when he meets a thrill-seeking femme fatale (Lucy Liu).

The film had its world premiere at the Tribeca Film Festival on May 1, 2007, and was released on DVD in the United States on August 12, 2008.

== Plot ==
Neil Lewis is the owner of the independent video store Gumshoe Video. He premieres a new, film noir-inspired commercial for Gumshoe Video. His girlfriend Denise, who appears in the commercial, does not attend the celebration. The next day, Neil meets Denise at a restaurant, but before he goes to the table, he pranks her by having a waiter spill a glass of water on her. Unamused by the prank, she tells him he needs to get his life together. He casually breaks up with her.

Back at Gumshoe Video, Neil is watching a film with his friend and employee Jonathan when spontaneous, thrill-seeking femme fatale Violet enters the store. Violet has no identification or credit card for her rental deposit, so she persuades him to take $50 in cash, which he puts in an envelope under his antique cash register. When she returns, she steals back the deposit, making him think he lost it, but she says he can take her out for a $50 dinner to make it up to her.

At the date, Violet arrives first and feigns intoxication. When Neil does not try to take advantage of the situation, she reveals her joke and they proceed with dinner. At her urging, they go to a Media Giant store—his corporate competitor—and prank the employees by switching DVDs into the wrong cases after the store closes. The police arrive, and they knock over some displays while fleeing. After evading the police, they hide behind a fence and Violet suggests they separate. While standing on opposite sides, they kiss through a hole.

The next day, they spy on Media Giant and see an employee talking to a police officer. Later, police detectives stop by Gumshoe Video to question Neil about the Media Giant break-in, terrifying Neil. Violet appears and laughs at Neil with the police officers, revealing that the whole ordeal was a prank and that the officers were actually her friends. A flummoxed Neil secretly trails Violet back to her house, where they end up in bed. The following morning, they go for a romantic swim.

Some time later, Neil is leaving to meet Violet at the park when he runs into friends who beg to come along and meet Violet. She feeds them another party's picnic meal and leaves them to answer for it. Neil tries to make their next date quieter, by watching a basketball game, but Violet grows bored and leaves. Later, he goes to see a band play at Jonathan's bar and spots Violet flirting with a musician. Jealous, he stages a private rock concert for her on their next date. After they have sex, she reveals that she knows he was spying on her at the bar. She tells him about all the musicians she has dated, including a bald, Polish avant-garde musician called the Bald Giant who stalks her from city to city. Paranoid, Neil imagines that every bald white man he sees is the stalker until Violet stages a scene where she has been tied to a chair by the Bald Giant, who turns out to be her friend Dennis. Frustrated by Violet's tomfoolery, Neil breaks up with her.

Neil encounters Denise and realizes that he treated her somewhat like Violet has treated him, and that he misses Violet and the excitement she created. When she calls and tells him to come to her workplace dressed as a cowboy, he does. She tricks him into stealing money from her job at an illegal casino, with Neil thinking it is another one of her pranks. He is shot at and chased. Neil is exhilarated by the crime, but Violet takes the money and informs him that he has been used. Neil mourns another breakup, but Violet returns to say that the breakup was a joke, too. Neil is initially infuriated, but Violet convinces him that his life is more interesting and adventurous with her in it. They reconcile and drive off to Graceland in the new car Violet bought with some of money from the robbery.

== Cast ==
- Cillian Murphy as Neil Lewis
- Lucy Liu as Violet
- Jason Sudeikis as Jonathan
- Michael Panes as Lucien
- Heather Burns as Denise
- Callie Thorne as Marcia
- Michael Yurchak as Buddy
- Lonny Ross as eager customer
- Josh Pais as Andy
- Erik Stolhanske as Chad
- Steve Lemme as the waiter
- Brett Gelman as Glenn
- Mark Harelik as Detective Barlow
- Ali Reza as Detective Lowenstein
- Paul Scheer as know-it-all customer
- Richard Waddingham as Dennis/the Bald Giant
- Josh Gad as Mark
- Paul Soter as Jason, the UPS delivery man (uncredited)

== Production ==
This film marks comedian Paul Soter's directorial debut. Soter and his fellow Broken Lizard troupe members Eric Stolhanske and Steve Lemme have cameos in the film.

== Release ==
Watching the Detectives had its world premiere at the Tribeca Film Festival on May 1, 2007. The film was originally planned to be released theatrically by Peace Arch Entertainment in North America in early 2008, to coincide with Valentine's Day. Instead, it was released in the United States on DVD on August 12, 2008. The film was first released on DVD in Poland on February 20, 2008, under the title Uwaga Violet.

== Reception ==
On DVD Talk, Phil Bacharach wrote that "Watching the Detectives would like to be a screwball romantic comedy in the tradition of What's Up, Doc? (...) but its head is in a much more precarious position."
