= Rosemead (film) =

2025 American drama film

- Theatrical release poster
- Directed by: Eric Lin
- Screenplay by: Marilyn Fu
- Based on: A dying mother’s plan: Buy a gun. Rent a hotel room. Kill her son. by Frank Shyong
- Produced by: Mynette Louie; Andrew D Corkin; Lucy Liu
- Starring: Lucy Liu; Lawrence Shou; Orion Lee; Jennifer Lim; Madison Hu; James Chen
- Cinematography: Lyle Vincent
- Edited by: Joseph Krings
- Music by: Will Bates
- Production companies: The Population; LA Times Studios; Untapped
- Distributed by: Vertical
- Release dates: June 6, 2025 (Tribeca); December 5, 2025 (United States)
- Running time: 97 minutes
- Country: United States
- Languages: English; Mandarin
- Box office: $285,983

Rosemead is a 2025 American drama film, directed by Eric Lin, in his directorial debut, from a screenplay by Marilyn Fu, inspired by Frank Shyong's 2017 Los Angeles Times article, "A dying mother’s plan: Buy a gun. Rent a hotel room. Kill her son.", regarding events that took place in Rosemead, California. It stars Lucy Liu, Lawrence Shou, Orion Lee, Jennifer Lim, Madison Hu and James Chen. It is set in the San Gabriel Valley of southern California and follows a terminally ill widow, Irene (Liu), dealing with her medical condition while handling her son Joe's (Shou) schizophrenia.

The film premiered at the 2025 Tribeca Festival on June 6, 2025, and it was released in the United States on December 5, 2025.

== Plot ==
Irene is a terminally ill widow who lives with her 17-year-old son Joe in the San Gabriel Valley of southern California. Since being diagnosed with schizophrenia, Joe has been seeing a therapist and taking medication. Irene hides the fact of her cancer diagnosis from Joe. Joe is a former star student and swimmer, whose schizophrenia symptoms worsen. Joe is usually dropped off at therapy sessions, but one day Irene decides to join Joe in a session, where the therapist has Joe reminisce of a happy time. Joe recounts a memory where Irene, his father, and Joe are dancing and singing in a motel at night.

Irene and Joe are eating food while listening to the radio talk about recent school shooting events. Joe turns up the volume before Irene turns it off. Joe has an active shooter drill at school and is overwhelmed. Immediately afterward, he has a psychotic break in which he runs between empty classrooms and destroys school property. The school discovers the damage, and also that Joe has sneaked into the school pool at night with friends. School administrators bring this situation to Irene, but she dismisses their suggestion to transfer Joe to another school with allegedly better resources to manage Joe's condition.

Joe stops taking his medication, and has more frequent episodes with bursts of violence. He shatters his iPad screen, destroys rooms, and eventually self-harms. One day, Irene finds Joe's laptop open with browser tabs on school shooting events (notably incidents from Sandy Hook, Virginia Tech, and Aurora, Colorado). Irene finds Joe in his room with the television volume turned up while the news details of victims and weapons. Irene tells Joe's therapist about his recent concerning search history. Irene also visits a local gun shop to check on whether Joe has visited the shop, and the shop owner confirms that Joe has visited and was interested in a gas mask.

Irene’s doctor tells her the experimental drug she is taking for her cancer is not working, and she only has months to live. Joe is arrested for jaywalking at night. Picking Joe up at the police station, Irene learns that upon Joe's 18th birthday, she will have much less control over Joe’s medical care.

Joe has another episode after learning that Irene plans to sell the printing shop. He goes missing, and his friends try to locate him. Irene drives around the city to look for Joe, while putting up missing person flyers. After a couple of days, Irene receives a call that Joe has been spotted at the same motel where his happy memories took place. Irene finds Joe behind a dumpster and takes him home. She visits her friend who owns an herbal medicine shop and drops off the deed to her printing shop, so the friend will get the money when it’s sold. She also visits the gun shop again and has a conversation with the owner.

Upon Joe's 18th birthday, Irene takes Joe to the motel that he has fond memories of. After eating cake, Irene gives Joe white sneakers, and Joe suggests to Irene that they should stay in the motel room forever so no one can bother them. Once Joe falls asleep, Irene meticulously cleans the room, then goes to her car to make a call to her friend to burn pictures of their family. Irene returns to the motel room and fatally shoots Joe. She is distraught over her actions and calls the police to turn herself in. She is arrested, but dies from her cancer before she can be tried in court. The friend prepares to burn the pictures, but blows out the match instead.

== Cast ==
- Lucy Liu as Irene
- Lawrence Shou as Joe
- Orion Lee as Charles
- Jennifer Lim as Kai-Li
- Madison Hu as Jeannie
- James Chen as Dr. Hsu
- Dave Shalansky as Principal Stephens

== Production ==
In September 2020, it was announced Lucy Liu had joined the cast of the film, with Eric Lin directing from a screenplay by Marilyn Fu, with Mynette Louie set to produce. Liu served as a producer and stayed with the project for over five years. Moreover, Liu practiced Mandarin to portray Irene's accent mannerisms.

Principal photography took place in New York.

== Release ==
Rosemead had its world premiere at the 2025 Tribeca Festival on June 6, 2025. It had its international premiere at the 78th Locarno Film Festival on August 14, 2025, at Piazza Grande, and won the festival's Prix du Public UBS audience award. In August 2025, Vertical acquired North American distribution rights to the film, scheduling it for a limited theatrical releasein the United States on December 5, 2025, and a wide release on January 9, 2026.

== Reception ==
On the review aggregator website Rotten Tomatoes, 87% of 52 critics' reviews are positive, with an average rating of 6.8/10. The website's consensus reads: "Tackling difficult subject matter with sensitivity, Rosemead is a superb showcase for Lucy Liu in one of her most emotionally-layered performances yet." Metacritic, which uses a weighted average, assigned the film a score of 72 out of 100, based on 8 critics, indicating "generally favorable" reviews.

Writing for NPR, A Martínez and Olivia Hampton notes Liu's performance "paints a wrenchingly compassionate portrait of an immigrant mother struggling to navigate multiple challenges in the wake of her husband's death". RogerEbert.com gives the film three out of four stars, saying the film has a "refreshing level of candor, straightforward but delicate in delivery".

== Accolades ==
Award	Date of the ceremony	Category	Nominee(s)	Result	Ref.
Tribeca Film Festival	June 15, 2025	US Narrative Competition	Rosemead	Nominated	
Bentonville Film Festival	June 22, 2025	Best Narrative Feature	Rosemead	Won	
Bentonville Film Festival	June 22, 2025	Rising to the Challenge Award	Lucy Liu	Won	
Locarno Film Festival	August 17, 2025	Prix du Public UBS	Rosemead	Won	
Miami Film Festival	October 25, 2025	Precious Gem Award	Lucy Liu	Won	
Belfast Film Festival	November 2, 2025	Réalta Award	Lucy Liu	Won	
Celebration of Asian Pacific Cinema and Television	November 14, 2025	Trailblazer Award	Lucy Liu	Won	
Golden Horse Awards	November 22, 2025	Best Adapted Screenplay	Marilyn Fu	Nominated	
Golden Horse Awards	November 22, 2025	FIPRESCI Prize	Rosemead	Nominated	
AARP Movies for Grownups Awards	January 10, 2026	Best Actress	Lucy Liu	Nominated	
AARP Movies for Grownups Awards	January 10, 2026	Best Intergenerational Film	Rosemead	Nominated	
