= Tom Kiesche =

American actor (born 1967)

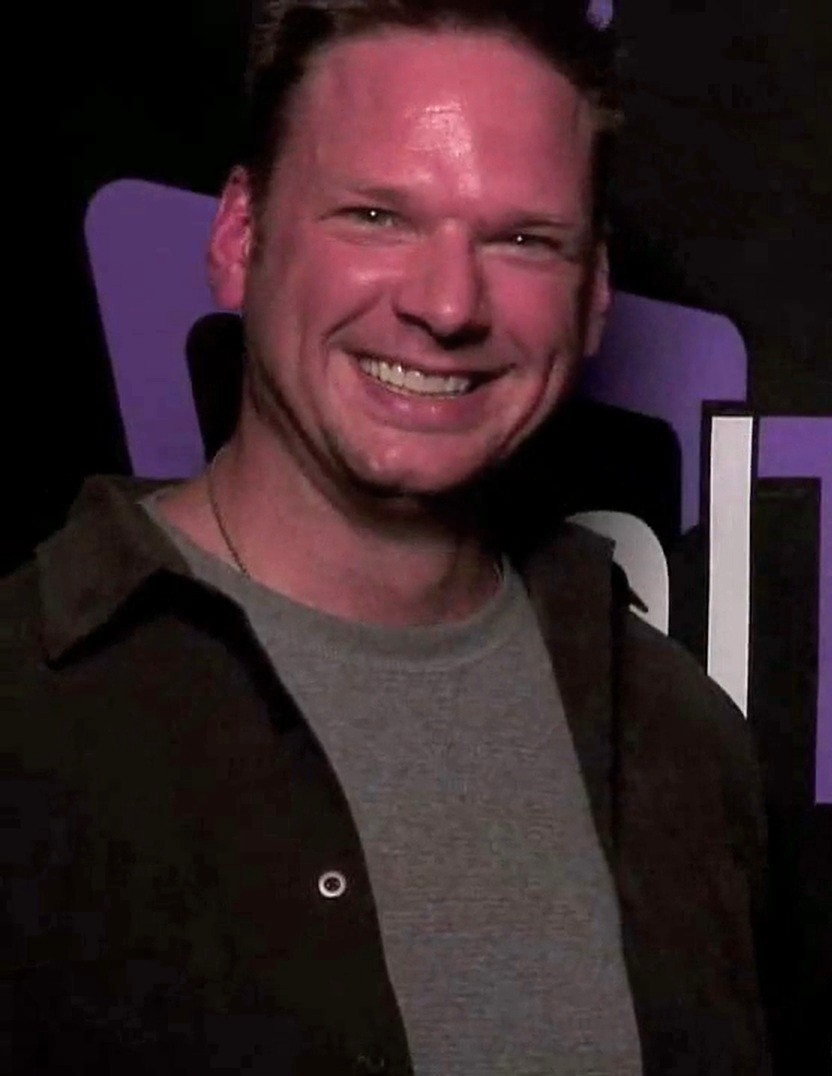
- Kiesche in 2009
- Born: October 2, 1967 (age 58); Hackensack, New Jersey, U.S.
- Occupations: Actor, novelist
- Years active: 1997–present
- Organization: Big Quiche Productions

Thomas Joseph Kiesche (born October 2, 1967) is an American film, television and stage actor, and novelist. In the AMC series Breaking Bad, he played the role of Clovis in seasons 2 and 3.

== Television ==
Kiesche has had recurring roles in Monk, Breaking Bad and Lights Out. His television guest appearances include Law & Order, Diagnosis Murder, 3rd Rock from the Sun, Angel, ER, Buffy the Vampire Slayer, Alias, JAG, The Guardian, Judging Amy, That '70s Show, CSI: Crime Scene Investigation, The Drew Carey Show, Las Vegas, Bones, Big Love, Weeds, NCIS, Without a Trace, CSI: Miami, Criminal Minds, Chuck, NCIS: Los Angeles, The Mentalist and Masters of Sex.

=== Television credits ===
Year	Film	Role	Notes
1997	As the World Turns	Fed #2	
1997	Law & Order	Court Clerk	
1998	LateLine	State Trooper	
1999	Diagnosis Murder	Dino Valenti	
2000	Chicago Hope	Pilgrim	
2000	3rd Rock from the Sun	Large Man	
2000	18 Wheels of Justice	Jenks	
2000	Angel	Detective Broomfield	
2001	Arrest & Trial	Defense Lawyer	
2001	ER	Officer Monroe	
2001	Buffy the Vampire Slayer	Vampire	
2002	Passions	Burly Guy	
2002	Alias	Agent Cooper	
2003	JAG	Security Guard	
2003	The Guardian	Leo Widenski	
2003	Judging Amy	Officer Cooke	
2003	24	Prison guard	
2003	Grounded for Life	Customer	
2003	Arrested Development	Umpire/Guard	
2004	That '70s Show	Mr. Romine	
2004	CSI: Crime Scene Investigation	Larry Coombs	
2004	The Drew Carey Show	Carl, the Dinosaur Guy	
2004	Las Vegas	Drew Higgins	
2003	McBride: Murder Past Midnight	Homicide Detective	TV movie
2005	Bones	Sheriff Chris Scutter	
2006	Desolation Canyon	Billy McAllister	TV movie
2006	Big Love	Officer Chuck Tuttle	
2006	The Unit	Gerald Thomas	
2006	Weeds	Plumber	
2006	NCIS: Naval Criminal Investigative Service	Bob Whitehead	
2006	Without a Trace	Jake West	
2007	CSI: Miami	Walter Dunley	
2007	Criminal Minds	Lt. Nellis	
2006	Monk	Annoyed Mover	Recurring
2006	The Unit	Gerald Thomas	
2010	Chuck	Julius	
2009-2010	Breaking Bad	Clovis	Recurring
2010	Justified	Drunk #1	
2010	Warrior Showdown	Gladiator	Also associate producer
2011	Lights Out	Big Yuppie	Recurring
2012	Ben and Kate	Bouncer	
2010	School and Board	Nelson Tuttleson	Recurring
2012	NCIS: Los Angeles	Remo the Receptionist	
2013	The Glades	Dave Hartwell	
2013	2 Hopeful Spinsters	Single Guy	
2010	The Mentalist	Ronald Hendricks	
2015	Romantically Speaking	Kenny the Driver	TV movie
2016	Masters of Sex	Jerry	
2020	Into The Arms of Danger	Sheriff Langford	TV movie

== Film ==
Kiesche's film roles include Logan in Alien Raiders, Captain Hank Garrison in W.M.D. and Zimmer in Resilience.

=== Film credits ===
Year	Film	Role	Notes
2001	The Animal	Bar Patron	
2005	Crazylove	Market Manager	
2006	True Men	Cop	
2006	Resilience	Zimmer	
2008	Alien Raiders	Logan	
2009	Alpha Males Experiment	Commercial Cop	
2013	W.M.D.	Captain Hank Garrison	
2016	She's Allergic to Cats	Exterminator	
2017	Watch the Sky	Jurassic Bob	
2017	The Purple Rose	Detective Bill Hansen	

=== Youtube show credits ===
Year	Film	Role	Notes
2018	A Girl Named Jo	Russel Fitzroy	

== Novelist ==
Kiesche's published works include Park Ranger Park, Sympathy for the Devil and Weakday Drifter & Other Writings.
