= Neil Bonnett =

American racing driver (1946–1994)

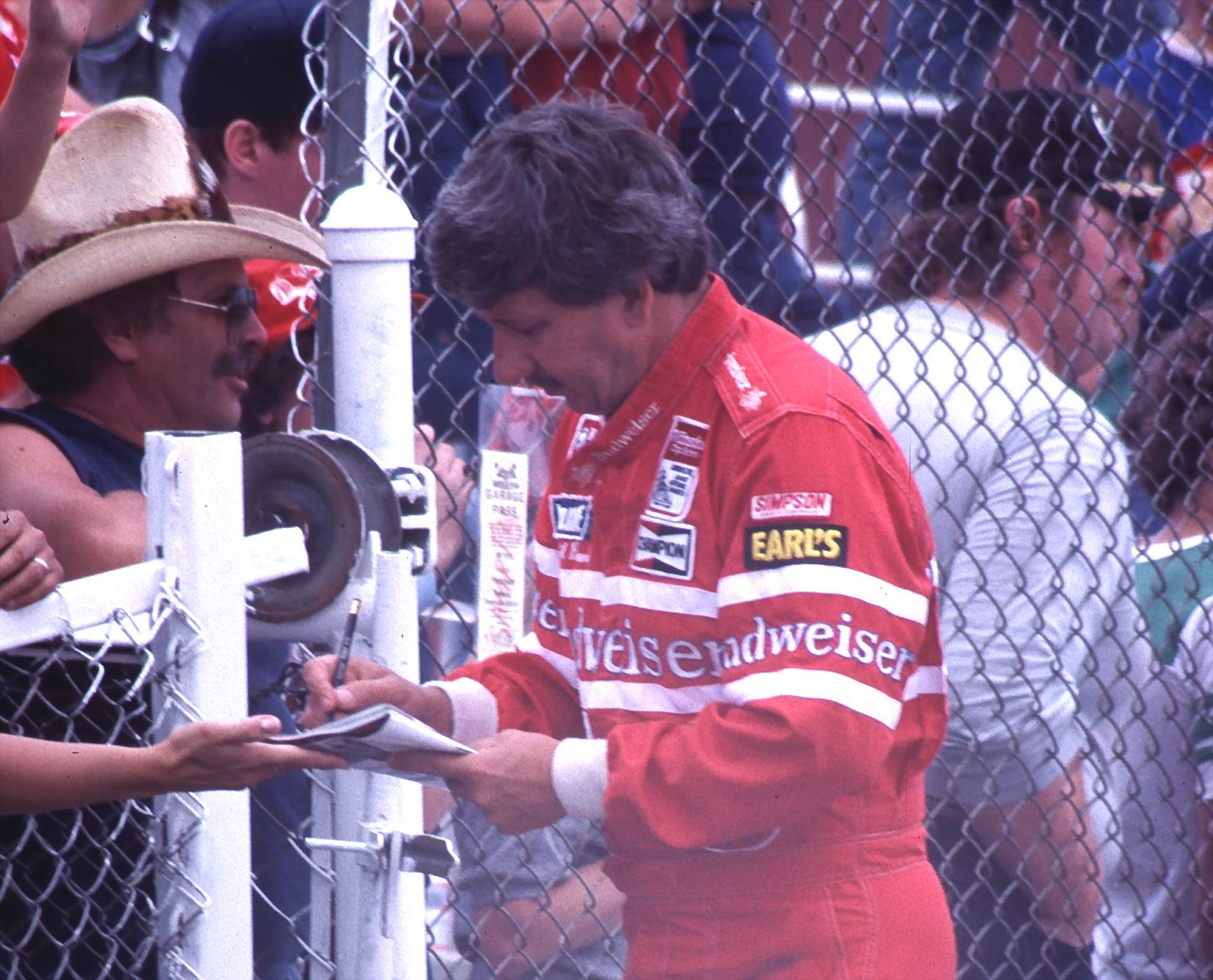
- Bonnett in 1985
- Born: July 30, 1946; Hueytown, Alabama, U.S.
- Died: February 11, 1994 (aged 47); Daytona Beach, Florida, U.S.
- Cause of death: Autoracing accident during practice for the 1994 Daytona 500
- Achievements: 1981 Southern 500 Winner; 1982, 1983 World 600 Winner; 1979 Firecracker 400 Winner; 1983, 1984 Busch Clash Winner; Winner of the first ever NASCAR race run outside of North America, the Goodyear NASCAR 500 held in Australia (1988)
- Awards: National Motorsports Press Association Hall of Fame (1997); Named one of NASCAR's 50 Greatest Drivers (1998); International Motorsports Hall of Fame (2001); Motorsports Hall of Fame of America (2012); Named one of NASCAR's 75 Greatest Drivers (2023)

NASCAR Cup Series career
- 362 races run over 18 years
- Best finish: 4th (1985)
- First race: 1974 Winston 500 (Talladega)
- Last race: 1993 Hooters 500 (Atlanta)
- First win: 1977 Capital City 400 (Richmond)
- Last win: 1988 Goodwrench 500 (Rockingham)
Wins	Top tens	Poles
18	156	20

NASCAR O'Reilly Auto Parts Series career
- 13 races run over 6 years
- Best finish: 29th (1983)
- First race: 1983 Goody's 300 (Daytona)
- Last race: 1993 Slick 50 300 (Atlanta)
- First win: 1983 Darlington 250 (Darlington)
Wins	Top tens	Poles
1	7	0
- Statistics up to date as of June 14, 2015.

Lawrence Neil Bonnett (July 30, 1946 – February 11, 1994) was an American NASCAR driver who compiled 18 victories and 20 poles over his 18-year career. Bonnett was a member of the Alabama Gang, and started his career with the help of Bobby and Donnie Allison. He rose to prominence in the late 1970s with his performances in cars owned by Jim Stacy and Wood Brothers Racing, becoming one of the top competitors in the 1980s. The Alabama native currently ranks 47th in all-time NASCAR Cup victories. He appeared in the 1983 film Stroker Ace and the 1990 film Days of Thunder. Bonnett hosted the TV show Winners for TNN from 1991 to 1994, and was a color commentator for CBS, TBS, and TNN in the years until his death. Bonnett's racing career was interrupted in 1990 when he suffered a severe brain injury in a crash that left him with amnesia and chronic dizziness. While working towards a much-anticipated comeback to the NASCAR circuit, Bonnett died as a result of injuries he sustained in a crash during a practice run for the 1994 Daytona 500. He lost control of his vehicle and collided with the outside wall in turn four, resulting in massive head injuries that proved fatal.

== NASCAR career ==
Bonnett was born in the Birmingham suburb of Hueytown, Alabama on July 30, 1946. Bonnett began his NASCAR career as a protégé of 1983 Winston Cup champion Bobby Allison, working on the team's cars. He later became part of the famous "Alabama Gang" that included himself, Red Farmer and the Allison family: father Bobby, brother Donnie and, later, son Davey. He began driving in NASCAR in 1974 and earned his first victory in 1977 at the Capital City 400 in Richmond, Virginia driving for Harry Hyde-Jim Stacy Racing, which had bought out the K&K Insurance team that he had previously driven for. He earned another victory in 1977 at the Los Angeles Times 500, which would be the last Dodge win in NASCAR until 2001. Many were anticipating a dominant year for Bonnett in 1978, but issues with his cars (stemming from financial problems between Hyde and Stacy) forced him to drop out of many races. In addition, Bonnett had grown tired of Stacy's dictatorial management style and tendency to miss payments, which led to Hyde suing Stacy for unpaid bills. In 1979, he signed with Wood Brothers Racing to replace David Pearson and revived his career with three victories. He then went on to win back-to-back World 600s (NASCAR's longest race, which is now the Coca-Cola 600) in 1982 and 1983, and back-to-back Busch Clash victories in 1983 and 1984.

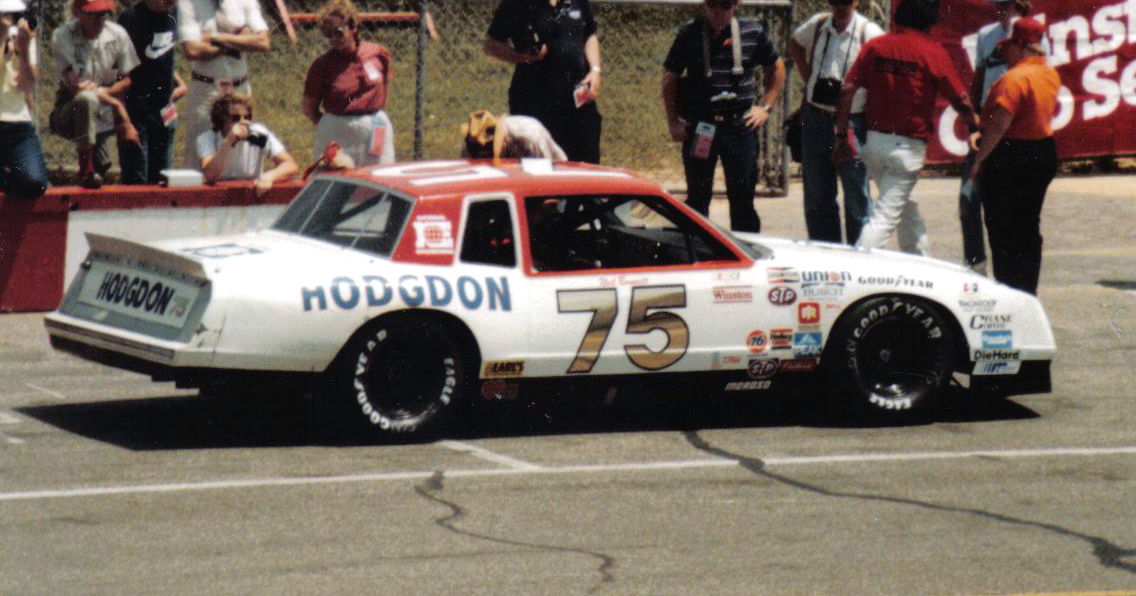
Neil Bonnett's 1983 NASCAR Winston Cup Series racecar.

In 1984, Bonnett joined Junior Johnson's racing team, becoming teammates with Darrell Waltrip. In 1985, he had his best statistical season, finishing fourth in the points standings. Waltrip went on to win his third Winston Cup championship.

Bonnett participated in International Race of Champions (IROC) during three seasons (1979, 1980, and 1984), and finished second twice.

Bonnett holds the distinction of being the winner of the first ever NASCAR race held outside of North America when he won the 1988 Goodyear NASCAR 500 at the Calder Park Thunderdome in Melbourne, Australia (at the time the newly opened Thunderdome was also the first NASCAR style speedway to be built outside of North America). The race, which ran two weeks after the Daytona 500, was not a Winston Cup race but featured some drivers from the circuit including fellow Alabama Gang member Bobby Allison, Michael Waltrip, Dave Marcis and Kyle Petty, who were up against Australian drivers somewhat new to NASCAR racing. Bonnett, who had won the Pontiac Excitement 400 at Richmond International Raceway the previous weekend, started from the pole driving his Valvoline sponsored Pontiac Grand Prix. He and Allison (who had won the Daytona 500 two weeks previous), driving a Buick LeSabre, dominated the 280 lap 500 km (310 mile) crash-marred race, finishing first and second, respectively, with Dave Marcis finishing third. Cabin temperatures in the cars were reported to have reached over 57 °C (135 °F) as the race was held during Australia's notoriously hot summer.

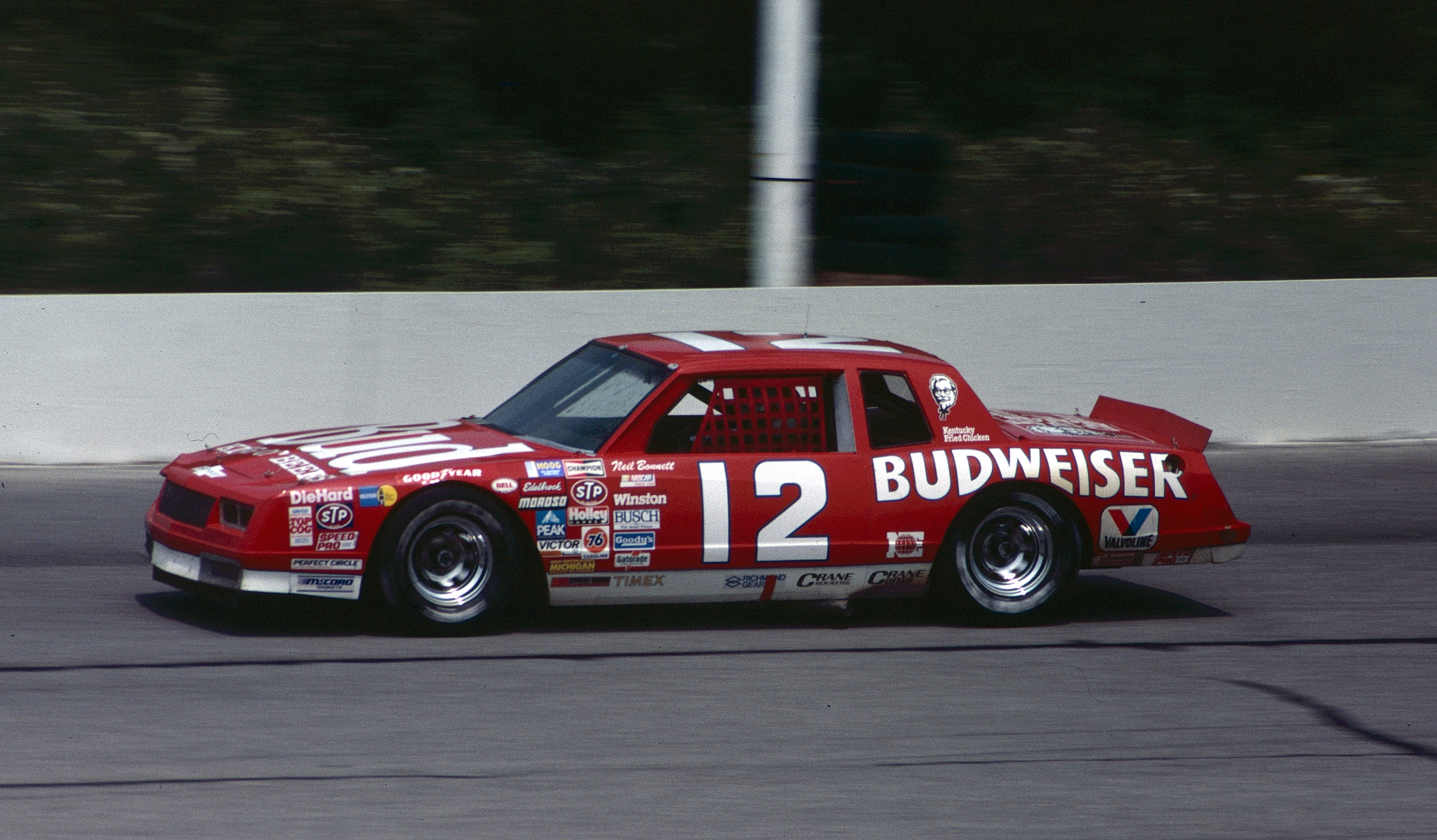
Bonnett at Pocono Raceway in 1985

On April 1, 1990, Bonnett was involved in a life-threatening crash during the TranSouth 500 at Darlington, South Carolina, when his car slammed into Sterling Marlin's car during a fourteen-car crash on lap 212. He was left with amnesia and dizziness, and ultimately chose to retire from racing and turn to television, where he became a race color commentator for TNN, CBS Sports, and TBS Sports, and hosted the TV show Winners for TNN.

However, Bonnett still desired to continue racing. In 1992, he began testing cars for his good friends, fellow racer Dale Earnhardt and car owner Richard Childress. Bonnett was medically cleared to race again in 1993 and upon Earnhardt's suggestion, Childress gave Bonnett a ride for the 1993 DieHard 500 at Talladega Superspeedway which was numbered 31 and sponsored by GM Goodwrench. His comeback race was marred by a crash in which his car spun, became airborne, and crashed into the spectator fence. He walked away from the wreck unharmed and called the remainder of the race from the CBS broadcast booth after being cleared at the infield care center. He would also start the final race of the 1993 season in Atlanta, but he dropped out after just three laps. The reason the team gave for removing the car from the race was a blown engine; however, he was teamed with points leader Earnhardt, and the car was retired to assist Earnhardt in winning the season's championship. Earnhardt needed to maximize his finishing position, and by Bonnett quitting the race he was assured of those three championship points. This would become Bonnett's final NASCAR Winston Cup Series start.

== Death ==
Despite the challenges and setbacks, Bonnett was determined to continue racing. He secured a ride and sponsorship for at least five races in the 1994 season with car owner James Finch, including the season-opening race, the Daytona 500, for Phoenix Racing. But on February 11, 1994, during the first practice session for the 1994 Daytona 500, a shock mount broke, causing him to lose control of his Chevrolet on the track's high-banked fourth turn. The car swerved onto the track apron, and then up the steep bank, before crashing into the wall nearly head-on. Bonnett did not survive the accident; he was 47 years old.

That weekend, another racing death occurred, as 1993 Goody's Dash (four-cylinder) champion Rodney Orr was also killed in a racing crash during the practices surrounding the first weekend. In the middle of the second Goodyear-Hoosier tire war, Hoosier withdrew from the race immediately. Five years later, the broken shock mounts became an issue again in NASCAR, as cars bottoming out were evident during the first night race at Daytona in 1998. By 2000, NASCAR imposed a new rule where the sanctioning body built the shocks and had mandatory specification springs for the cars to prevent this tactic, to stop the dangerous tactics being used to reduce drag that led to the fatal crashes.

Bonnett is buried in Pleasant Grove's cemetery, Forest Grove Memorial Gardens. A road called "Allison-Bonnett Memorial Drive" in his hometown honors him, along with fellow native Davey Allison, who died seven months earlier.

When Earnhardt, Bonnett's colleague, won the 1998 Daytona 500, he dedicated the victory to Bonnett among others.

Earnhardt himself died in a racing accident during the final lap of the 2001 Daytona 500. About three weeks after the accident, magazine photographers released photographs of Bonnett's autopsy, as well as those of another driver who died a few days later, Rodney Orr, to the public, which led to a lawsuit.

When Brad Keselowski scored Phoenix Racing's first Sprint Cup win fifteen years later in the 2009 Aaron's 499 at Talladega Superspeedway, Finch dedicated the win to Bonnett. During the 2013 season, Finch designed the No. 51 car's paint scheme in the Sprint Cup and Nationwide Series like Bonnett's 1994 Country Time Chevrolet that he drove shortly before his death.

== In popular culture ==
Bonnett was portrayed by the actor Sean Bridgers in the TV movie 3: The Dale Earnhardt Story.

== Motorsports career results ==
=== NASCAR ===
(key) (Bold – Pole position awarded by qualifying time. Italics – Pole position earned by points standings or practice time. * – Most laps led.)

==== Winston Cup Series ====
NASCAR Winston Cup Series results
Year	Team	No.	Make	1	2	3	4	5	6	7	8	9	10	11	12	13	14	15	16	17	18	19	20	21	22	23	24	25	26	27	28	29	30	31	NWCC	Pts	Ref
1973	K&K Insurance Racing	1	Dodge	RSD	DAY	RCH	CAR	BRI	ATL	NWS	DAR	MAR	TAL; DNQ	NSV	CLT	DOV	TWS	RSD	MCH	DAY	BRI	ATL	TAL	NSV	DAR	RCH	DOV	NWS	MAR	CLT	CAR				NA	-	
1974	Roberts Racing	77	Chevy	RSD	DAY	RCH	CAR	BRI	ATL	DAR	NWS	MAR	TAL; 45	NSV	DOV	CLT	RSD	MCH	DAY	BRI	NSV	ATL	POC												87th	3.52	
1974	Bobby Allison Motorsports	1	Chevy																					TAL; 39	MCH	DAR	RCH	DOV	NWS	MAR	CLT	CAR	ONT		87th	3.52	
1975	Bobby Allison Motorsports	12	Chevy	RSD	DAY	RCH	CAR	BRI	ATL	NWS	DAR	MAR	TAL	NSV	DOV	CLT	RSD	MCH	DAY	NSV; 14	POC	TAL; 35	MCH	DAR	DOV	NWS	MAR	CLT	RCH	CAR	BRI	ATL	ONT		NA	0	
1976	Bonnett Racing	12	Chevy	RSD	DAY; 5	CAR	RCH	BRI	ATL; 8	NWS	DAR; 30	MAR; 19	TAL; 39	NSV	DOV	CLT	RSD; 29	MCH	DAY; 33			TAL; 38	MCH; 6	BRI	DAR; 24	RCH	DOV	MAR	NWS; 28	CLT; 35	CAR	ATL; 8	ONT		32nd	1130	
1976	Penske Racing	2	Mercury																	**NSV**; QL^{†}	POC														32nd	1130	
1977	K&K Insurance Racing	71	Dodge	RSD; 17	DAY; 37	**RCH**; 7	CAR; 5	ATL; 12	**NWS**; 21	DAR; 33	BRI; 4	**MAR**; 12	TAL; 29	NSV	DOV	CLT; 7	RSD	MCH																	18th	2649	
1977	Jim Stacy Racing	5	Dodge																**DAY**; 8	NSV; 21	POC	TAL; 25	MCH	BRI; 17	DAR	RCH; 1*	**DOV**; 17	**MAR**; 22	NWS; 3	CLT; 8	CAR; 28	ATL; 38	ONT; 1*		18th	2649	
1978	Jim Stacy Racing	5	Dodge	RSD; 4	DAY; 27	**RCH**; 9	**CAR**; 6	ATL; 33	**BRI**; 26	DAR; 32	NWS; 24	MAR; 2		DOV; 5		NSV; 5	RSD; 10	MCH; 36																	12th	3129	
1978	Jim Stacy Racing	5	Olds										TAL; 39		CLT; 35								MCH; 9												12th	3129	
1978	Osterlund Racing	5	Chevy																DAY; 23	NSV; 28	POC; 36	TAL; 8		BRI; 20	DAR; 34	RCH; 3*		MAR; 4	NWS; 5	CLT; 30	CAR; 31	ATL; 34	ONT; 37		12th	3129	
1978	Osterlund Racing	5	Olds																								DOV; 29								12th	3129	
1979	Jim Stacy Racing	5	Chevy	RSD; 34																															26th	2223	
1979	Jim Stacy Racing	5	Olds		DAY; 32																														26th	2223	
1979	Ellington Racing	5	Olds			CAR; 33	RCH	ATL	NWS	BRI																									26th	2223	
1979	Kennie Childers Racing	12	Olds								DAR; 13																								26th	2223	
1979	Wood Brothers Racing	21	Mercury									MAR; 25	TAL; 17*	NSV	DOV; 1	**CLT**; 25	TWS	RSD; 28	**MCH**; 4	DAY; 1*	NSV	POC; 8	**TAL**; 34	MCH; 33	BRI	DAR; 32	RCH	DOV; 21	MAR; 18	**CLT**; 31	NWS	CAR; 29	ATL; 1	ONT; 6	26th	2223	
1980	Wood Brothers Racing	21	Mercury	RSD; 34	DAY; 3	RCH	CAR; 6	ATL; 41	BRI	DAR; 36	NWS	MAR; 6	TAL; 27	NSV	DOV; 18	CLT; 5	TWS	RSD; 2	MCH; 4	DAY; 34	NSV	POC; 1*	TAL; 1	MCH; 2	BRI	DAR; 5	RCH	DOV; 6	NWS	MAR; 19	CLT; 30	CAR; 25	ATL; 2	ONT; 2	19th	2865	
1981	Wood Brothers Racing	21	Ford	RSD; 27	DAY; 33	RCH	CAR; 4	ATL; 28	BRI	NWS	DAR; 29	MAR; 2	TAL; 32	NSV	DOV; 13*	**CLT**; 29	TWS	RSD; 4	MCH; 9	DAY; 30	NSV	POC; 34	TAL; 37	MCH; 28	BRI	DAR; 1*	RCH	DOV; 1*	MAR; 4	NWS	CLT; 29*	CAR; 35	ATL; 1*	RSD; 33	22nd	2449	
1982	Wood Brothers Racing	21	Ford	DAY; 25	RCH; 7		ATL; 27	CAR; 19	DAR; 24		MAR; 3	TAL; 19		DOV; 19	CLT; 1	POC	RSD; 5	MCH; 11	DAY; 32	NSV	POC	TAL; 16	MCH; 9	BRI	DAR; 34	RCH; 5	DOV; 21	NWS	CLT; 28	MAR; 22	CAR; 3	ATL; 11	RSD; 4		17th	2966	
1982	Rogers Racing	37	Buick			BRI; 22				NWS; 10			NSV; 5																						17th	2966	
1983	RahMoc Enterprises	75	Chevy	DAY; 22	RCH; 3	CAR; 12	ATL; 2	DAR; 7	**NWS**; 4	MAR; 16	TAL; 15	NSV; 13	DOV; 28	**BRI**; 4	CLT; 1	RSD; 13	POC; 7	MCH; 31	DAY; 28	NSV; 6	POC; 4	TAL; 35	MCH; 35	BRI; 10	**DAR**; 4	RCH; 8	DOV; 7	MAR; 6	NWS; 13	CLT; 26	**CAR**; 4	ATL; 1	RSD; 3		6th	3842	
1984	Junior Johnson & Associates	12	Chevy	DAY; 4	RCH; 5	CAR; 28	ATL; 33	BRI; 11	NWS; 9	DAR; 10	MAR; 5	TAL; 23	NSV; 2*	DOV; 15	CLT; 12	RSD; 2	POC; 14	MCH; 17	DAY; 9	NSV; 10	POC; 19	TAL; 19	MCH; 13	BRI; 23	DAR; 30	RCH; 7	DOV; 6	MAR; 5	CLT; 16	NWS; 4	CAR; 33	ATL; 21	RSD; 6		8th	3802	
1985	Junior Johnson & Associates	12	Chevy	DAY; 10	RCH; 23	CAR; 1	**ATL**; 3	BRI; 19	DAR; 6	NWS; 1*	MAR; 5	TAL; 26	DOV; 8	CLT; 15	RSD; 27	POC; 5	MCH; 8	DAY; 12	POC; 2*	TAL; 2	MCH; 11	BRI; 3	DAR; 4	RCH; 9	DOV; 5	MAR; 9	NWS; 10	CLT; 42	CAR; 15	ATL; 12	RSD; 3				4th	3902	
1986	Junior Johnson & Associates	12	Chevy	DAY; 32	RCH; 7	CAR; 9	ATL; 34	BRI; 30	DAR; 4	NWS; 11	MAR; 26	TAL; 40	DOV; 28	CLT; 13	RSD; 8	POC; 23	MCH; 25	DAY; 11	POC; 31	TAL	GLN; 5	MCH; 34	BRI; 11	DAR; 24	RCH; 5	DOV; 2	MAR; 8	NWS; 12	CLT; 3	CAR; 1	ATL; 6	RSD; 9			13th	3369	
1987	RahMoc Enterprises	75	Pontiac	DAY; 12	CAR; 3	RCH; 22	ATL; 7	DAR; 6	NWS; 3	BRI; 11	MAR; 9	TAL; 7	CLT; 13	DOV; 9	POC; 8	RSD; 3	MCH; 17	DAY; 18	POC; 7	TAL; 32	GLN; 37	MCH; 9	BRI; 10	DAR; 32	RCH; 10	DOV; 3	MAR; 4	NWS; 11	CLT; 36	CAR	RSD	ATL			12th	3352	
1988	RahMoc Enterprises	75	Pontiac	DAY; 4	RCH; 1	CAR; 1*	ATL; 22	DAR; 19	BRI; 11	NWS; 19	MAR; 30	TAL; 14	CLT; 36	DOV; 35	RSD; 10	POC; 11	MCH; 19	DAY; 18	POC	TAL	GLN; 38	MCH; 40	BRI; 14	DAR; 16	RCH; 9	DOV; 8	MAR; 19	CLT; 18	NWS; 28	CAR; 10	PHO; 21	ATL; 13			16th	3040	
1989	Wood Brothers Racing	21	Ford	DAY; 42	CAR; 14	ATL; 7	RCH; 21	DAR; 39	BRI; 12	NWS; 13	MAR; 10	TAL; 9	CLT; 7	DOV; 7	SON; 11	POC; 8	MCH; 24	DAY; 21	POC; 23	TAL; 10	GLN; 36	MCH; 15	BRI; 9	DAR; 15	RCH; 7	DOV; 26	MAR	CLT	NWS	CAR; 6	PHO; 34	ATL; 9			20th	2995	
1990	Wood Brothers Racing	21	Ford	DAY; 11	RCH; 25	CAR; 36	ATL; 18	DAR; 30	BRI	NWS	MAR	TAL	CLT	DOV	SON	POC	MCH	DAY	POC	TAL	GLN	MCH	BRI	DAR	RCH	DOV	MAR	NWS	CLT	CAR	PHO	ATL			43rd	455	
1993	Richard Childress Racing	31	Chevy	DAY	CAR	RCH	ATL	DAR	BRI	NWS	MAR	TAL	SON	CLT	DOV	POC	MCH	DAY	NHA	POC	TAL; 34	GLN	MCH	BRI	DAR	RCH	DOV	MAR	NWS	CLT	CAR	PHO	ATL; 42		67th	98	
1994	Phoenix Racing	51	Chevy	DAY; Wth^{‡}	CAR	RCH	ATL	DAR	BRI	NWS	MAR	TAL	SON	CLT	DOV	POC	MCH	DAY	NHA	POC	TAL	IND	GLN	MCH	BRI	DAR	RCH	DOV	MAR	NWS	CLT	CAR	PHO	ATL	NA	-	
^{†} – Qualified for Bobby Allison · ^{‡} – Fatal accident

===== Daytona 500 =====
Year	Team	Manufacturer	Start	Finish
1976	Bonnett Racing	Chevrolet	13	5
1977	K&K Insurance Racing	Dodge	11	37
1978	Jim Stacy Racing	Dodge	12	27
1979	Jim Stacy Racing	Oldsmobile	20	32
1980	Wood Brothers Racing	Mercury	3	3
1981	Wood Brothers Racing	Ford	3	33
1982	Wood Brothers Racing	Ford	14	25
1983	RahMoc Enterprises	Chevrolet	4	22
1984	Junior Johnson & Associates	Chevrolet	7	4
1985	Junior Johnson & Associates	Chevrolet	19	10
1986	Junior Johnson & Associates	Chevrolet	12	32
1987	RahMoc Enterprises	Pontiac	15	12
1988	RahMoc Enterprises	Pontiac	14	4
1989	Wood Brothers Racing	Ford	38	42
1990	Wood Brothers Racing	Ford	31	11
1994	Phoenix Racing	Chevrolet	Wth^{†}	
^{†} – He died during practice before season started

==== Busch Series ====
NASCAR Busch Series results
Year	Team	No.	Make	1	2	3	4	5	6	7	8	9	10	11	12	13	14	15	16	17	18	19	20	21	22	23	24	25	26	27	28	29	30	31	32	33	34	35	NBSC	Pts	Ref
1983	Butch Mock Motorsports	75	Pontiac	DAY; 3	RCH	CAR; 6	HCY	MAR	NWS	SBO	GPS	LGY	DOV	BRI	CLT; 2	SBO	HCY	ROU	SBO	ROU	CRW	ROU	SBO	HCY	LGY	IRP	GPS	BRI	HCY	DAR; 1*	RCH	NWS	SBO	MAR	ROU	CLT; 5	HCY	MAR	29th	820	
1984		89	Olds	DAY; 22	RCH	CAR	HCY	MAR	DAR	ROU	NSV	LGY	MLW	DOV	CLT	SBO	HCY	ROU	SBO	ROU	HCY	IRP	LGY	SBO	BRI	DAR	RCH	NWS	CLT	HCY	CAR	MAR							87th	97	
1985	Darrell Waltrip Motorsports	17	Chevy	DAY	CAR	HCY	BRI	MAR	DAR	SBO	LGY	DOV	CLT; 2	SBO	HCY	ROU	IRP	SBO	LGY	HCY	MLW	BRI	DAR	RCH	NWS	ROU	CLT	HCY	CAR	MAR									66th	170	
1987	RahMoc Enterprises	51	Pontiac	DAY; 35	HCY	MAR	DAR	BRI	LGY	SBO	CLT	DOV	IRP	ROU	JFC	OXF	SBO	HCY	RAL	LGY	ROU	BRI	JFC	DAR; 4	RCH	DOV	MAR	CLT; 26	CAR	MAR									45th	303	
1988		51	Pontiac	DAY; 41	HCY	CAR	MAR	DAR	BRI	LNG	NZH	SBO	NSV	CLT	DOV	ROU	LAN	LVL	MYB	OXF	SBO	HCY	LNG	IRP	ROU	BRI	DAR	RCH	DOV	MAR									71st	164	
1988	Bobby Allison Motorsports	12	Buick																												CLT; 13	CAR	MAR						71st	164	
1993	Dale Earnhardt, Inc.	3	Chevy	DAY	CAR	RCH	DAR	BRI	HCY	ROU	MAR	NZH	CLT	DOV	MYB	GLN	MLW	TAL	IRP	MCH	NHA	BRI	DAR	RCH	DOV	ROU	CLT	MAR	CAR	HCY	ATL; 35								106th	58	

=== International Race of Champions ===
(key) (Bold – Pole position. * – Most laps led.)

International Race of Champions results
Year	Make	Q1	Q2	Q3	1	2	3	4	Pos.	Pts	Ref
1978–79	Chevy	MCH; 4	MCH	RSD	RSD; 7	ATL; 1			2nd	NA	
1979–80	Chevy	MCH; 1	MCH	RSD	**RSD**; 7	ATL; 7			7th	20	
1984	Chevy				MCH; 1	CLE; 6	TAL; 11	MCH; 1	2nd	55	

== See also ==
- List of NASCAR fatal accidents

Preceded by J. D. McDuffie	NASCAR Sprint Cup Series fatal accidents 1994	Succeeded by Rodney Orr
