= Creagen Dow =

American actor, writer, producer

- Born: May 1, 1991 (age 35); Lake Wales, Florida, U.S.
- Citizenship: United States; Canada
- Occupations: Actor; writer; producer; programmer
- Years active: 2004–present
- Website: http://www.creagendow.com

Creagen Dow (born May 1, 1991) is an American and Canadian actor, writer, producer, and programmer who had a recurring role as Jeremiah Trottman on the Nickelodeon series Zoey 101. He has also guest-starred on The Big Bang Theory, Rizzoli & Isles, Hannah Montana, Castle, Entourage, Hot in Cleveland, CSI: NY, and other shows. Creagen received a Best Supporting Actor – Platinum Award for his role in the feature film Hamlet's Ghost at the 2015 CineRockom Film Festival, and also appeared alongside Reese Witherspoon and Vince Vaughn in Four Christmases, with Sean Astin in Amazing Love and provided the voice of "Mullet Boy" in the film The Ant Bully. Creagen appears in various TV commercials, including the GEICO Horror Movie - It's What You Do campaign.

He has developed applications for iOS and Android. Outside of his work in acting, Creagen invented a line of ash & resin-removing ashtrays called Poke A Bowl. Poke A Bowl makes an appearance in the music video to "Mind of a Stoner" by rapper Machine Gun Kelly (featuring Wiz Khalifa), and American actress Kathy Bates used it on the Netflix series Disjointed. It is currently among the most popular ashtrays.

== Filmography ==
=== Film ===
Year	Film	Role	Other notes
2004	Costume Party Capers: The Incredibles	Joey	TV film
2004	From the Ashes	Traveller's Son	Cameo appearance
2006	Auteur	Young Eric	
2006	The Ant Bully	Mullet Boy	voice
2007	The Last Day of Summer	Gus	Television movie
2008	Four Christmases	Sheep	
2008	The Least of These	Patrick	
2012	Amazing Love	Gameboy	
2015	Hamlet's Ghost	Jerry Vaughn	
2017	Doobious Sources	Ky Kittridge	

=== Television ===
Year	Television series	Role	Other notes
2006	Hannah Montana	Donny	2 episodes
2007	Chuck	Teenage Boy	2 episodes
2005–2008	Zoey 101	Jeremiah Trottman	14 episodes
2012	CSI: NY	Gear Soldier	2 episodes
Television guest appearances
Year	Television series	Role	Other notes
2006	Without a Trace	Peter Hoyt - Age 14	"Check Your Head" (Season 4, Episode 17)
2006	Veronica Mars	Ferret Boy	"Welcome Wagon" (Season 3, Episode 1)
2008	Greek	Geek	"Crush Landing" (Season 2, Episode 2)
2009	Castle	Max Heller	"Hedge Fund Homeboys" (Season 1, Episode 3)
2009	Numb3rs	Leonard Philber	"Disturbed" (Season 5, Episode 21)
2009	Entourage	Dude	"Murphy's Lie" (Season 6, Episode 6)
2009	FlashForward	Billy	"Rules Of The Game" (Season 1, Episode 8)
2011	Hot in Cleveland	Dan	"I Love Lucci: Part Two" (Season 2, Episode 6)
2014	Suburgatory	Manager	"Dalia Nicole Smith" (Season 3, Episode 11)
2015	Rizzoli & Isles	Cecil "Spike" Wilson	"The Platform" (Season 6, Episode 1)
2016	The Big Bang Theory	Glenn	"The Valentino Sublimation" (Season 9, Episode 15)
2017	Disjointed	Ethan	"Olivia's S***balls" (Season 1, Episode 9)

== See also ==
- List of celebrities who own cannabis businesses
