= Bill McKinney =

American actor (1931–2011)

- McKinney in Every Which Way but Loose
- Born: William Denison McKinney; September 12, 1931; Chattanooga, Tennessee, U.S.
- Died: December 1, 2011 (aged 80); San Fernando, California, U.S.
- Occupation: Actor
- Years active: 1967–2011
- Spouse(s): Norma Shannon, Janelle Booth, Donna Lamana, Felicity McKinney
- Children: 2

William Denison McKinney (September 12, 1931 – December 1, 2011) was an American character actor. He played the sadistic mountain man in John Boorman's 1972 film Deliverance and appeared in seven Clint Eastwood films, most notably as Captain Terrill, the commander pursuing the last rebels to "hold out" against surrendering to the Union forces in The Outlaw Josey Wales.

== Early life ==
William Denison McKinney was born September 12, 1931, in Chattanooga, Tennessee. He had an unsettled life as a child, moving 12 times. At the age of 19, he joined the Navy during the Korean War. He served two years on a mine sweeper in Korean waters, and was stationed at Port Hueneme in Ventura County, California. After being discharged in 1954, he settled in California, attending acting school at the Pasadena Playhouse in 1957. His classmates included Dustin Hoffman and Mako Iwamatsu. During this time, McKinney became an arborist to earn money, a job which he would hold until the mid-1970s.

== Career ==
After the Pasadena Playhouse, McKinney moved on to Lee Strasberg's Actors Studio, making his movie debut in exploitation pic She Freak (1967). For 10 years he was a teacher at Cave Spring Middle School. He made his television debut in 1968 on an episode of The Monkees and attracted attention as Lobo in Alias Smith and Jones. The film Deliverance (1972) proved to be his breakthrough, playing the backwoods mountain man who violently rapes Ned Beatty's character.

McKinney's other films in the early 1970s included appearances in Junior Bonner (1972), The Life and Times of Judge Roy Bean (1972) and The Parallax View (1974).

It was with Clint Eastwood that McKinney would become most associated, becoming part of Eastwood's stock company after they worked together in Michael Cimino's Thunderbolt and Lightfoot (1974).

He appeared in The Outlaw Josey Wales (1976) under Eastwood's direction. He appeared in six more Eastwood films, including The Gauntlet (1977), Every Which Way but Loose (1978), Any Which Way You Can (1980) and Pink Cadillac (1989).

Other memorable roles include Jay Cobb, who is done in by John Wayne in Wayne's final film The Shootist (1976). He also appeared in such later films as First Blood (1982), Back to the Future Part III (1990) and The Green Mile (1999). He appeared in the television film The Execution of Private Slovik (1974) and guest-starred on such television shows as Sara, The Young Indiana Jones Chronicles, Starsky & Hutch, The A-Team, Hunter, Murder, She Wrote, Columbo: Swan Song and In The Heat of The Night.

McKinney took up singing in the late 1990s, eventually releasing an album of standards and country and western songs appropriately titled Love Songs from Antri, reflecting Don Job's pronunciation of the infamous town featured in Deliverance. One of his songs featured in the film Undertow, directed by David Gordon Green. He voiced Jonah Hex in an episode of Batman: The Animated Series called "Showdown". He appeared in a cameo in 2001 Maniacs (2005) and had a role in the Robin Hood–inspired horror film Sherwood Horror (2010).

== Death ==
On December 1, 2011, McKinney died from esophageal cancer at his home in San Fernando, California. He was 80. McKinney's death was announced on his Facebook page on the same day. The announcement read:

Today our dear Bill McKinney passed away at Valley Presbyterian Hospice. An avid smoker for 25 years of his younger life, he died of cancer of the esophagus. He was 80 and still strong enough to have filmed a Dorito's commercial 2 weeks prior to his passing, and he continued to work on his biography with his writing partner. Hopefully 2012 will bring a publisher for the wild ride his life was. He is survived by son Clinton, along with several ex-wives. R.I.P. Bill sept.12 1931 – dec. 1 2011 [sic].

== Selected filmography ==
=== Film ===
Year	Title	Role	Notes
1967	She Freak	Steve St. John	
1968	Firecreek	Bearded Gunfighter	Uncredited
1968	The Road Hustlers	Hays	
1970	Angel Unchained	Shotgun	
1972	Deliverance	Mountain Man	
1972	Junior Bonner	Red Terwiliger	
1972	Kansas City Bomber	Buddy Taylor	Uncredited
1972	The Life and Times of Judge Roy Bean	Fermel Parlee	
1973	Cleopatra Jones	Purdy	
1973	The Outfit	Buck Cherney	
1974	Thunderbolt and Lightfoot	Crazy Driver	
1974	The Parallax View	Parallax Assassin	
1974	For Pete's Sake	Rocky	Uncredited
1975	Breakheart Pass	Reverend Peabody	
1976	The Outlaw Josey Wales	Captain Terrill	
1976	Cannonball	Cade Redman	
1976	The Shootist	Cobb	
1977	Valentino	Policeman	
1977	The Gauntlet	Constable	
1978	Every Which Way but Loose	Dallas	
1979	When You Comin' Back, Red Ryder?	Tommy Clark	
1980	Carny	Marvin Dill	
1980	Bronco Billy	Lefty LeBow	
1980	Any Which Way You Can	Dallas	
1981	St. Helens	Kilpatrick	
1982	Tex	Pop McCormick	
1982	First Blood	Dave Kern	
1983	Heart Like a Wheel	Don Garlits	
1984	Against All Odds	Head Coach	
1985	Final Justice	Chief Wilson	
1987	Under the Gun	Miller	
1988	War Party	Mayor	
1989	Kinjite: Forbidden Subjects	Father Burke	
1989	Pink Cadillac	Coltersville Bartender	
1990	Back to the Future Part III	Engineer	
1994	City Slickers II: The Legend of Curly's Gold	Matt	
1998	Where's Marlowe?	Uncle Bill	
1999	The Green Mile	Jack Van Hay	
2001	True Legends of the West	Mayor	
2003	Asylum of the Damned	Gas Station Attendant	
2003	The Commission	Roy Truly	
2003	Looney Tunes: Back in Action	Acme Vice President	
2004	Undertow	Grandfather	
2005	2001 Maniacs	Chef	
2006	The Garage	Bernie	
2006	The Devil Wears Spurs	Barkeeper	
2007	Take	Benjamin Gregor	
2007	Lucky You	Satellite Cashier	
2007	Ghost Town	Victor Burnett	
2008	Pride and Glory	Cop	
2009	Fuel	Jake	
2010	How Do You Know	Maitre d'	
2011	The Custom Mary	Silent Boss	

=== Television ===
Year	Title	Role	Notes
1968	The Monkees	Janitor	Episode: "Some Like It Lukewarm"
1970	I Dream of Jeannie	Crewman #1	Episode: "The Solid Gold Jeannie"
1970	The Bold Ones: The New Doctors	Apartment Crasher	Episode: "This Will Really Kill You"
1970	McCloud	Reuben	Episode: "The Concrete Corral"
1971-1972	Alias Smith and Jones	Lobo Briggs	4 episodes
1973	Ironside	Augie Morris	Episode: "All About Andrea"
1974	Mannix	Derek Lewis	Episode: "A Rage to Kill"
1974	Columbo	Luke Basket	Episode: "Swan Song"
1974	Get Christie Love!	Coleman	Episode: "Bullet from the Grave"
1974	Kodiak	Abel	Episode: "Capture"
1974	The Strange and Deadly Occurrence	The Man	—
1975	The Manhunter	Smiley	Episode: "Day of Execution"
1975	Strange New World	Badger	Television film
1975	Baretta	Treach/Tobias	2 episodes
1975	Bronk	Hank	Episode: "Wheels of Death"
1975	The Family Holvak	Sheriff Shanks	3 episodes
1976	Sara	Tom Sellers	Episode: "Half Breed"
1978	Starsky & Hutch	Johnny Bagley	Episode: "The Trap"
1979	The Runaways	Frank Bedsole	Episode: "They'll Never Forgive Me"
1979	Young Maverick	Smokey Trumbull	Episode: "Hearts O' Gold"
1979-1981	B. J. and the Bear	Various	4 episodes
1980	Palmerstown, U.S.A.		Episode: "The Black Travelers"
1980	Galactica 1980	Barrett	Episode: "Space Croppers"
1981-1985	The Fall Guy	Various	3 episodes
1981	The Misadventures of Sheriff Lobo	Ernie Kelbow	Episode: "Bang, Bang...You're Dead"
1981	Bret Maverick	Ramsey Bass	Episode: "The Lazy Ace"
1982	Knight Rider	Cop	Episode: "Knight of the Phoenix"
1982	Father Murphy	Joseph Redstone	Episode: "Stopover in a One-Horse Town"
1983-1985	The A-Team	Clint/Rokyo	2 episodes
1983	The Yellow Rose	Buck	2 episodes
1984	The Master	Sheriff Kyle	Episode: "Max"
1984	Legmen	Billy Ray	Episode: "I Shall Be Re-Released"
1984	Cover Up	Sgt. Oliver	Episode: "Golden Opportunity"
1985	Riptide	Sheriff	Episode: "Fuzzy Vision"
1986	Murder, She Wrote	Charlie Demsey	Episode: "Powder Keg"
1987	Falcon Crest	Mr. Warner	Episode: "Lovers and Friends"
1987	Ohara	Jake Gordon	Episode: "Silver in the Hills"
1987	Houston Knights	Sgt. Dale Lipscomb	3 episodes
1990	Yellowthread Street	Hicks	Episode: "Key Murders"
1990	The China Lake Murders	Captain Finney	Television film
1990	Hunter	Harlan Pinder	Episode: "Deadly Encounters"
1991	In the Heat of the Night	Ashe Crowe	Episode: "Obsession"
1992	Baywatch	Drew/Major Nicholas Slade	2 episodes
1993	The Young Indiana Jones Chronicles	Mack	Episode: "Young Indiana Jones and the Scandal of 1920"
1993	Love, Cheat & Steal	Kolchak	Television film
1993	The New WKRP in Cincinnati		
1995	Pointman	Hosey	Episode: "A Polecat Runs Through It"
1995	Batman: The Animated Series	Jonah Hex (voice)	Episode: "Showdown"
1995	Walker, Texas Ranger	Sheriff Bridges	Episode: "Point After"
1996	The Lazarus Man		Episode: "The Wallpaper Prison"
2000	The Magnificent Seven	Liver-Eating Jones	Episode: "Serpents"
