= Resilience (film) =

2006 film directed by Paul Bojack

- Directed by: Paul Bojack
- Written by: Paul Bojack
- Starring: Henry LeBlanc; Al Rossi; Julie Alexander; Steve Wilcox; Amy Arce
- Cinematography: Michael Parry
- Edited by: Brad Mays
- Music by: Markian Fedorowycz; Michael Lengies
- Release date: 2006
- Running time: 96 min.
- Country: United States
- Language: English

Resilience is a 2006 American drama/thriller film. It was written and directed by Paul Bojack, and starred Henry LeBlanc, Al Rossi, Julie Alexander, Steve Wilcox, and Amy Arce. Resilience garnered strong reviews from The New York Times, Variety, and Film Threat. The Library of the Academy of Motion Picture Arts and Sciences acquired the screenplay for its permanent core collection.

== Cast ==
- Henry LeBlanc
- Al Rossi
- Julie Alexander
- Steve Wilcox
- Amy Arce
- Eric Cadora
- Kristen Davidson
- Ron E. Dickinson
- Jake Eberle
- Stephen Full
- Alejandro Furth
- Kevin Goulet
- Jennifer Jalene
- Tom Kiesche
- Jayne Amelia Larson
