= Doobious Sources =

- Directed by: Clif Lord
- Written by: Clif Lord; Tommy Sowards
- Produced by: Samuel Burton; Concetta Halstead; JJ Lee; Clif Lord
- Starring: Jason Weissbrod; Jeff Lorch
- Cinematography: Stephen Treadway
- Edited by: Concetta Halstead; Miki Miyazaki Gilmour
- Music by: Christopher Lord; E. Shepherd Stevenson
- Production company: Doobious Sources
- Distributed by: Gravitas Ventures
- Release date: 2 January 2017 (Cannabis Film Festival)
- Running time: 98 minutes
- Country: United States
- Language: English

Doobious Sources is a 2017 American comedy film directed by Clif Lord, starring Jason Weissbrod and Jeff Lorch.

== Cast ==
- Jason Weissbrod as Zorn Tappadapo
- Jeff Lorch as Reginald Block-Hunsleigh
- Creagen Dow as Ky Kittridge
- Joe Cortese as Magnus Martindale
- Edward James Gage as Evander Bagby
- Dan Warner as Greg Newman
- Mark Costello as Blake Morgan
- Henry LeBlanc as Mayor Simon Jessup
- Dave Shalansky as Mr. X
- Patrick O'Connor as Ritchie Pagosi
- Kara Luiz as Megan Jessup
- Maggie Rowe as Dr. Laura Ingall
- Brynn Thayer as Josie Martindale
- Ilya Jordanov as Bart Hosing

== Release ==
The film premiered at the Maine Cannabis Film Festival on 2 January 2017, where it won the Golden Leaf award.

== Reception ==
Michael Rechtshaffen of the Los Angeles Times called the film "wildly unfunny".

Edward Douglas of Film Journal International wrote that the film does not contain "anything even remotely funny".

Frank Scheck of The Hollywood Reporter wrote that the film "manages to take the fun out of smoking pot."
