= Lucy Liu =

American actress (born 1968)

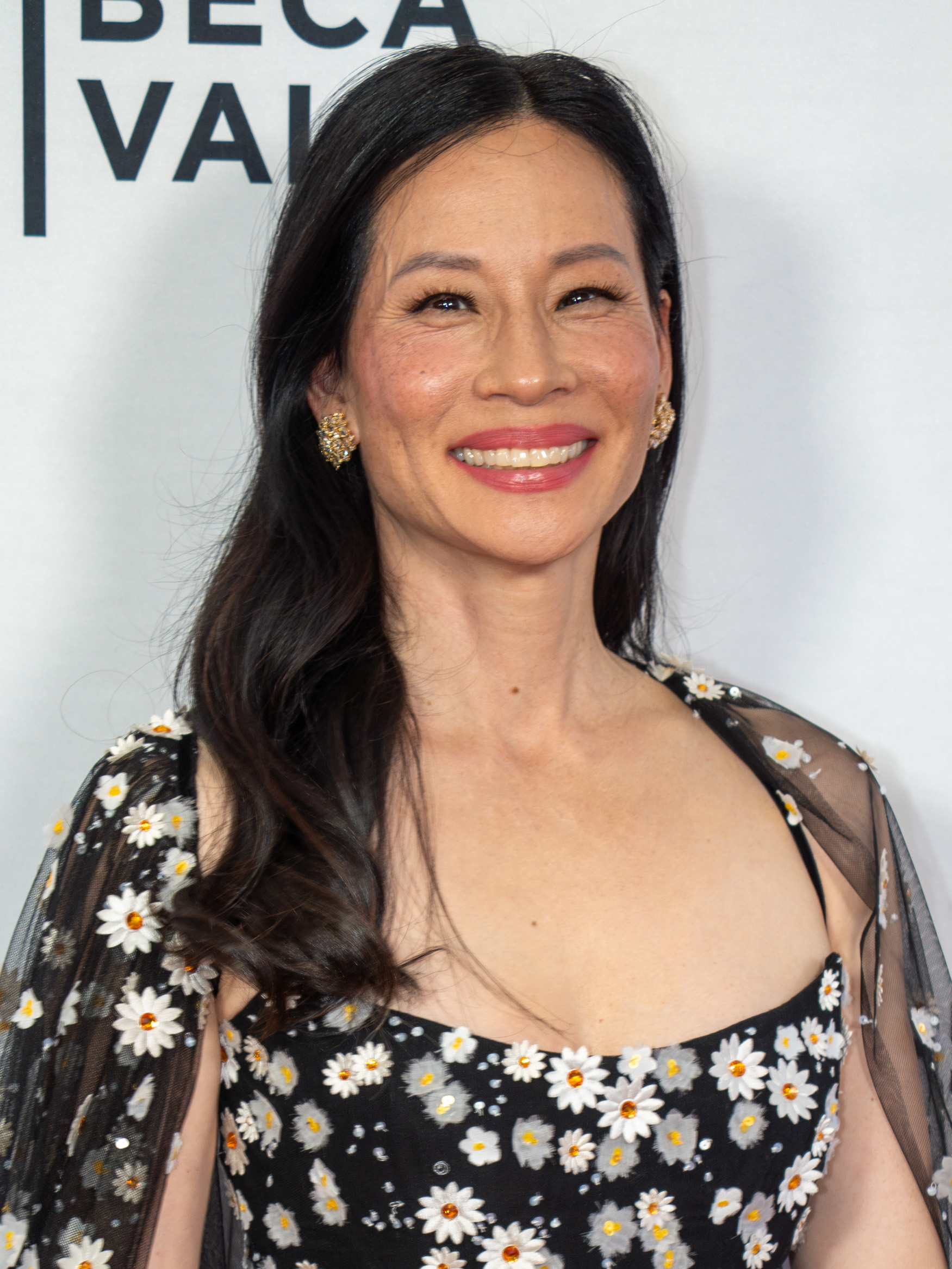
- Liu at the 2025 Tribeca Festival
- Born: December 2, 1968 (age 57); New York City, U.S.
- Education: New York University; University of Michigan (BA)
- Occupations: Actress; director; artist; producer
- Years active: 1991–present
- Children: 1

Chinese name
- Traditional Chinese: 劉玉玲
- Simplified Chinese: 刘玉玲
Transcriptions
Standard Mandarin
- Hanyu Pinyin: Liú Yùlíng
- Website: lucyliuofficial.com

Lucy Alexis Liu (/ˈljuː/) (born Lucy Liu; December 2, 1968) is an American actress, producer, and artist. Regarded as a Hollywood icon and a trailblazer for Asian-American representation in Hollywood, she is the recipient of numerous accolades, including two Critics' Choice Awards, two Screen Actors Guild Awards, and nominations for two Primetime Emmy Awards. A prominent sex symbol in the late 1990s and early 2000s, she has been recognized for shifting Western mainstream beauty standards. In 2019, Liu became the second Chinese American woman to be honored with a star on the Hollywood Walk of Fame.

Liu had her breakthrough role as Ling Woo in the Fox legal comedy-drama series Ally McBeal (1998–2002). She received further recognition for starring in the action comedy film Charlie's Angels (2000) and its sequel Charlie's Angels: Full Throttle (2003), and the martial arts action film Kill Bill: Volume 1 (2003) and its sequel Kill Bill: Volume 2 (2004). She also starred in the films Payback (1999), Shanghai Noon (2000), Chicago (2002), Lucky Number Slevin (2006), Watching the Detectives (2007), The Man with the Iron Fists (2012), Set It Up (2018), Shazam! Fury of the Gods (2023), and Presence (2024). In 2025, she received renewed critical attention for her performance in the psychological drama Rosemead.

Liu starred as Dr. Joan Watson in the CBS crime drama series Elementary (2012–2019) and Simone Grove in Why Women Kill (2019). She also voiced Master Viper in the first three films of the Kung Fu Panda franchise (2008–2016) and Silvermist in the Tinker Bell series (2008–2015). Her other voice credits include the children's series Maya & Miguel (2004–2007) on PBS Kids, the animated films Mulan II (2004) and Strange World (2022), as well as the English and Mandarin-dubbed versions of the animated films The Tale of the Princess Kaguya (2013) and Magic Wonderland (2014). She also appeared in The Devil Wears Prada 2 (2026) as Sasha Barnes.

== Early life and education ==
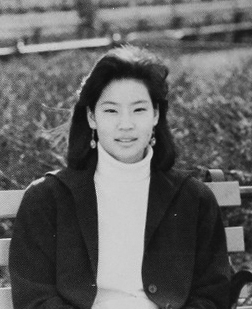
Liu as a high school senior in 1986

Lucy Liu was born in on December 2, 1968, in the Jackson Heights neighborhood of Queens, New York City. In high school, she adopted a middle name, Alexis. She is the youngest of three children. Her mother, Cecilia, worked as a biochemist, and her father, Tom Liu, was a civil engineer who also sold digital clock pens. Liu's parents originally came from Beijing and Shanghai and immigrated to Taiwan as adults before meeting in New York. She has an older brother, John, and an older sister, Jenny. Her parents had many jobs while Lucy and her siblings were growing up.

Liu has stated that she grew up in a diverse neighborhood. She learned to speak Mandarin at home and began studying English when she was five. She studied the martial art kali-eskrima-silat as a hobby when she was young. Liu attended Joseph Pulitzer Middle School (I.S.145), and graduated from Stuyvesant High School. She entered New York University before transferring to the University of Michigan, where she was a member of the Chi Omega sorority and graduated in 1990 with a Bachelor of Arts degree in Asian languages and cultures.

== Career ==
=== 1990s: Beginnings and Ally McBeal ===
Liu became interested in acting as a child, after hearing about someone her own age who had been in a television commercial. At the age of 19 she was discovered by an agent while traveling on the subway, and appeared in one commercial as a result. As a member of the Basement Arts student-run theater group, she auditioned in 1989 for the University of Michigan's production of Alice in Wonderland during her senior year of college. Although she had originally tried out for only a supporting role, Liu was cast in the lead. While in line to audition for the musical Miss Saigon in 1990, she told The New York Times, "There aren't many Asian roles, and it's very difficult to get your foot in the door." In May 1992, Liu made her New York stage debut in Fairy Bones at Pan Asian Repertory Theatre, directed by Tina Chen.

Liu had small roles in films and TV, marking her debut. In 1992, she made her big-screen debut in the Hong Kong film Rhythm of Destiny, which starred Danny Lee and Aaron Kwok. In 1993, she appeared in an episode of L.A. Law as a Chinese widow giving her evidence in Mandarin. Liu co-starred on the Rhea Perlman sitcom Pearl, which lasted one season. She appeared in The X-Files (Season 3, Episode 19 "Hell Money") as well. Shortly after the end of Pearl's run in 1997, Liu was cast in a role on Ally McBeal. Liu originally auditioned for the role of Nelle Porter (played by Portia de Rossi), and the character Ling Woo was later created specifically for her. Liu's part on the series was originally temporary, but high audience ratings secured Liu as a permanent cast member. Additionally, she earned a Primetime Emmy Award nomination for Outstanding Supporting Actress in a Comedy Series and a Screen Actors Guild Award nomination for Outstanding Performance by a Female Actor in a Comedy Series.

=== 2000s: Breakthrough in film ===
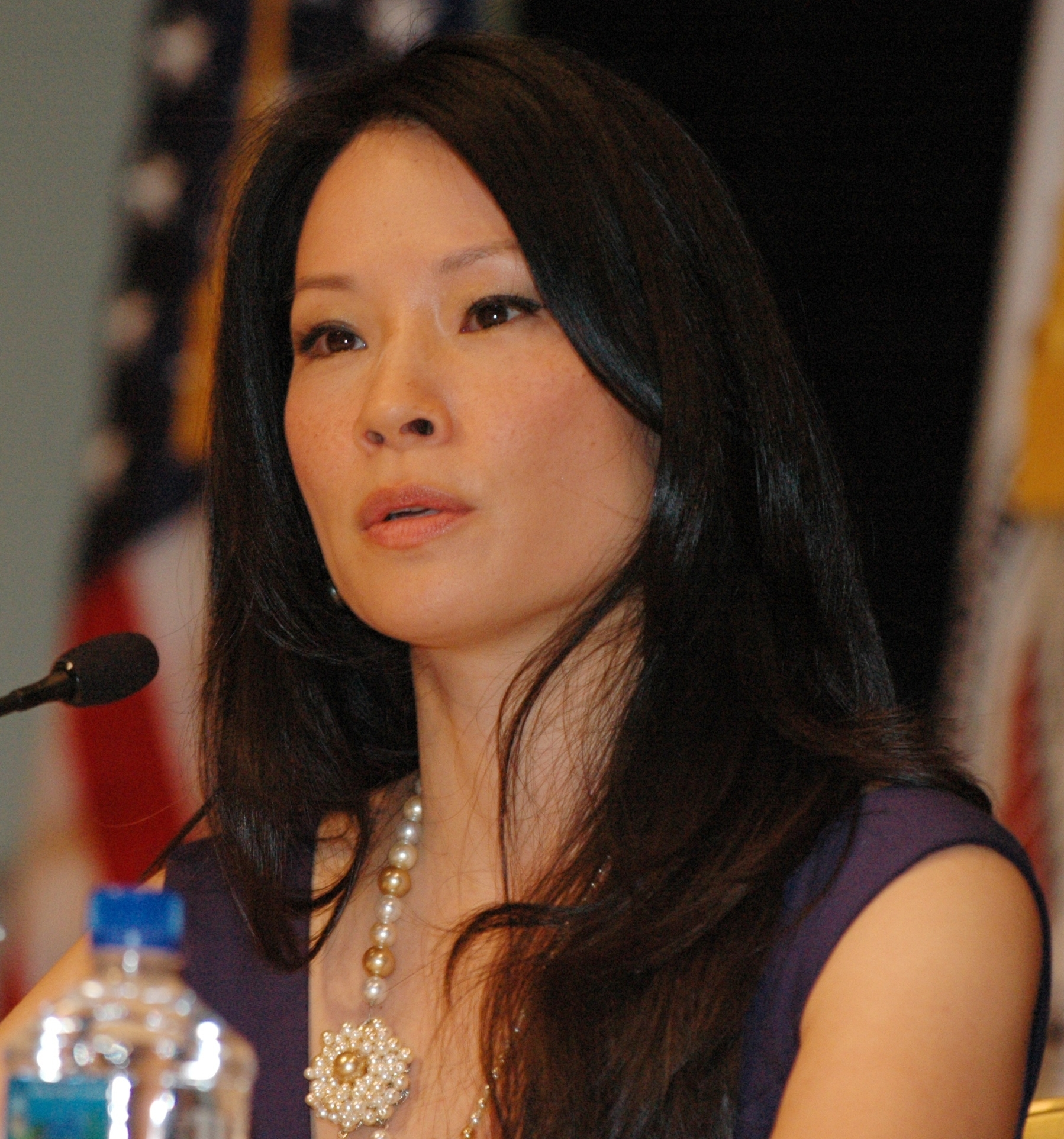
Liu speaking at the USAID Human Trafficking Symposium in September 2009

In 2000, Liu starred in Charlie's Angels along with Drew Barrymore and Cameron Diaz. In 2001, Liu was the spokeswoman for the Lee National Denim Day fundraiser, which raises money for breast cancer research and education. In 2004 Liu was appointed an ambassador for U.S. Fund for UNICEF. She traveled to Pakistan and Lesotho, among several other countries. In 2002, Liu played Rita Foster in Vincenzo Natali's Brainstorm. She appeared as O-Ren Ishii in Quentin Tarantino's 2003 film, Kill Bill. While in negotiations for Kill Bill with Tarantino the two joined to help produce the Hungarian sports documentary Freedom's Fury. She won an MTV Award for Best Movie Villain for her part in Kill Bill. Subsequently, Liu appeared on several episodes of Joey with Matt LeBlanc, who played her love interest in the Charlie's Angels films. She also had minor roles as Kitty Baxter in the film Chicago and as a psychologist opposite Keira Knightley in the thriller Domino. In Lucky Number Slevin, she played the leading love interest to Josh Hartnett. 3 Needles was released on December 1, 2006, Liu portrayed Jin Ping, an HIV-positive Chinese woman.

Liu had previously presented her artwork under her Chinese name, Yu Ling. Liu, who is an artist in several media, has had several gallery shows showcasing her collage, paintings, and photography. She began doing collage mixed media when she was 16 years old, and became a photographer and painter. Liu attended the New York Studio School for drawing, painting, and sculpture from 2004 to 2006. In September 2006, Liu held an art show and donated her share of the profits to UNICEF. She also had another show in 2008 in Munich. Her painting, "Escape", was incorporated into Montblanc's Cutting Edge Art Collection and was shown during Art Basel Miami 2008, which showed works by contemporary American artists. Liu has stated that she donated her share of the profits from the NYC Milk Gallery gallery show to UNICEF. In London, a portion of the proceeds from her book Seventy Two went to UNICEF.

Early in 2006, Liu received an "Asian Excellence Award" for Visibility. She also hosted an MTV documentary, Traffic, for the MTV EXIT campaign in 2007. In 2008, she produced and narrated the short film The Road to Traffik, about the Cambodian author and human rights advocate Somaly Mam. The film was directed by Kerry Girvin and co-produced by photographer Norman Jean Roy. This led to a partnership with producers on the documentary film Redlight.

In 2007, Liu appeared in Code Name: The Cleaner; Rise: Blood Hunter, a supernatural thriller co-starring Michael Chiklis in which Liu plays an undead reporter (for which she was ranked number 41 on "Top 50 Sexiest Vampires"); and Watching the Detectives, an independent romantic comedy co-starring Cillian Murphy. She also planned to make her producing debut and star in a remake of Charlie Chan, which had been planned as early as 2000. In 2007 Empire named Liu number 96 of their "100 Sexiest Movie Stars". The producers of Dirty Sexy Money created a role for Liu as a series regular. Liu played Nola Lyons, a powerful attorney who faced Nick George (Peter Krause). Liu voiced Silvermist in Disney Fairies and Viper in Kung Fu Panda.

=== 2010s: Mainstream transition ===
In March 2010, Liu made her Broadway debut in the Tony Award–winning play God of Carnage as Annette on the second replacement cast alongside Jeff Daniels, Janet McTeer, and Dylan Baker. Liu is a supporter of marriage equality for same-sex marriage, and became a spokeswoman for the Human Rights Campaign in 2011. She has teamed up with Heinz to combat the widespread global health threat of iron deficiency anemia and vitamin and mineral malnutrition among infants and children in the developing world.

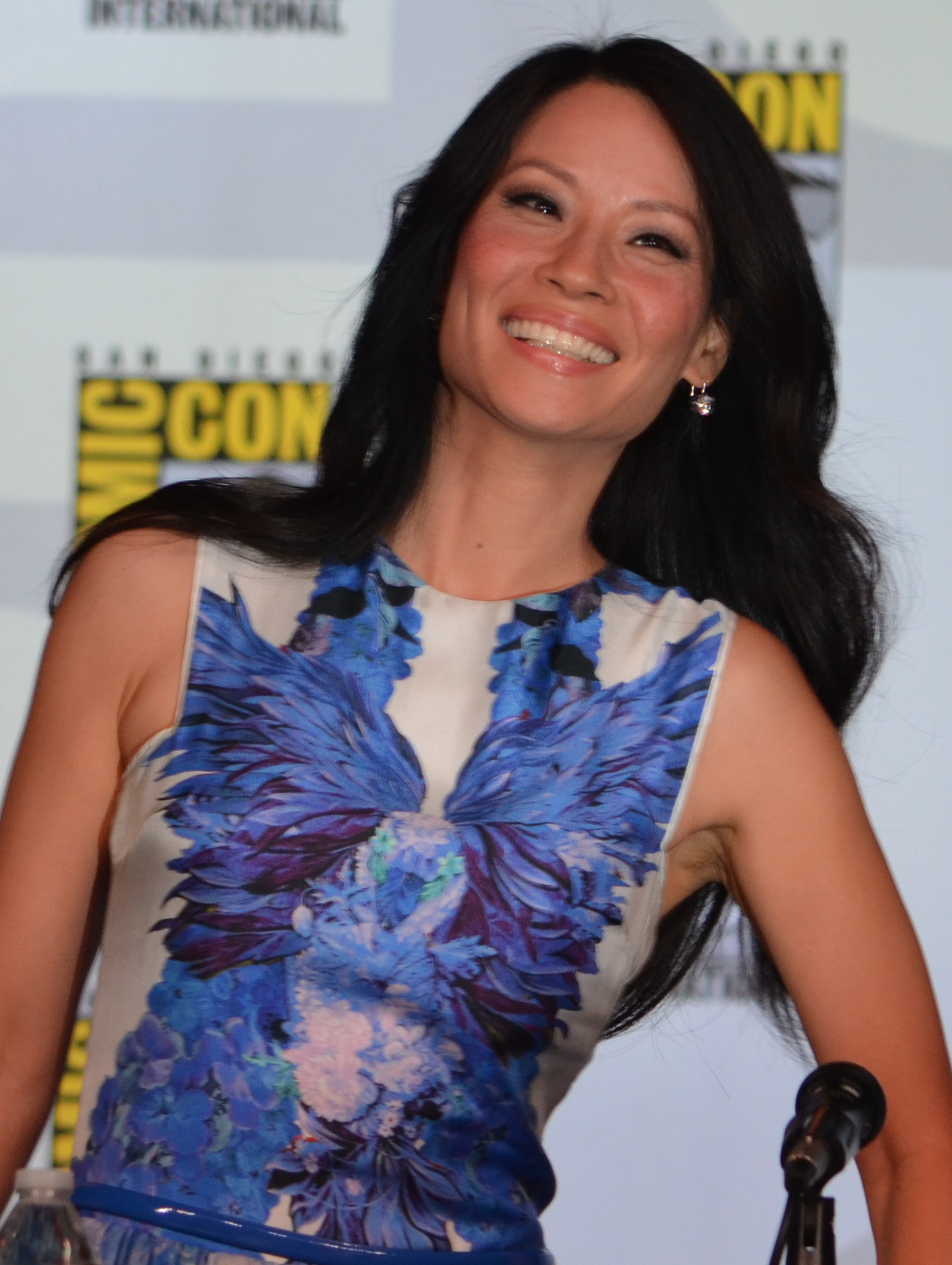
Liu at the 2012 San Diego Comic-Con

In March 2012, she was cast as Joan Watson for Elementary. Elementary is an American Sherlock Holmes adaptation, and the role Liu was offered is traditionally played by men. She has gained praise for her role as Watson, including three consecutive nominations for the People's Choice Awards for Favorite TV Crime Drama Actress. She also has played police officer Jessica Tang on Southland, a television show focusing on the lives of police officers and detectives in Los Angeles, as a recurring guest actor during the fourth season. She received the Critics' Choice Television Award for Best Drama Guest Actress for this role. Liu's other directorial credits include 6 episodes of Elementary, an episode of Graceland, the episode "Dearly Beloved" of Law & Order: Special Victims Unit, and the second-season premiere of Luke Cage.

In August 2011, Liu became a narrator for the musical group The Bullitts. In 2013, Liu was invited to become a member of the Academy of Motion Picture Arts and Sciences. Liu was named Harvard's 2016 Artist of the Year. She was awarded the Harvard Foundation's arts medal at the annual Harvard Foundation Award ceremony, during the Cultural Rhythms Festival in Sanders Theatre. She is also part of the cast in the post-apocalyptic thriller Future World, directed by James Franco and Bruce Thierry Cheung. Her first national museum exhibition was held at the National Museum of Singapore in early 2019 and was titled "Unhomed Belongings."

In 2019, she played houselite Simone Grove in the first season of the CBS series Why Women Kill.

=== 2020s: Continued film roles ===
In April 2021, Liu was cast as the villainess Kalypso in the superhero film Shazam! Fury of the Gods. In 2022, she voiced the role of Callisto Mal in the Walt Disney Animation Studios film Strange World. In 2024, she starred in Steven Soderbergh's psychological thriller film Presence and Jake Kasdan's Christmas action comedy film Red One.

In 2025, Liu starred in and produced Rosemead as a mother diagnosed with a terminal illness who has a troubled child. It had its world premiere at the Tribeca Festival in June 2025. Liu will next star and executive produce Superfakes for Peacock. In August 2026, Liu joined the executive production team of Reset, an upcoming science fiction film based on a short film of the same name that won the Silver Audience award at the Fantasia International Film Festival in 2026.

== Personal life ==
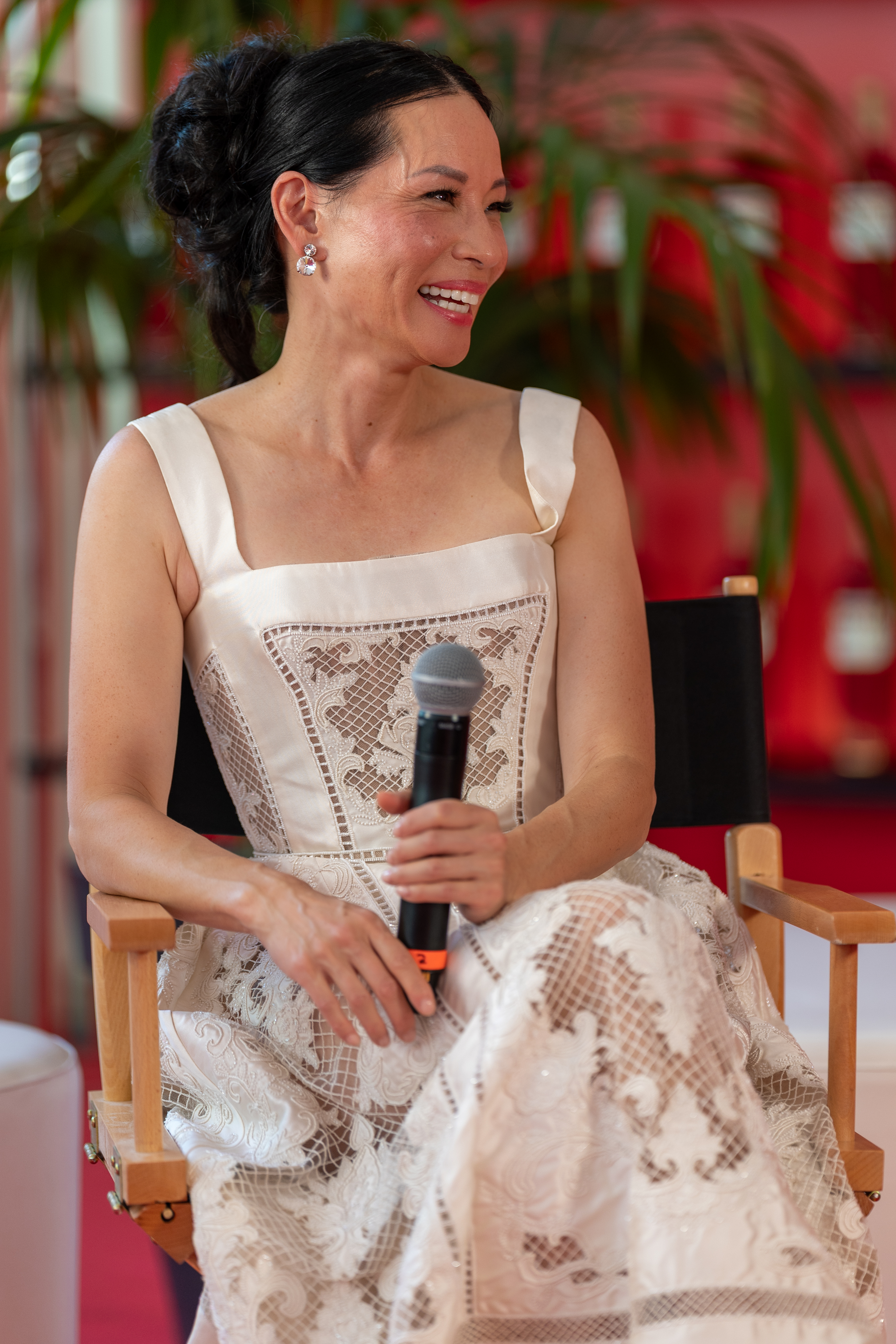
Liu in 2025

Liu has been vegetarian since childhood. Liu has studied various religions, mainly Buddhism and Taoism, and briefly Kabbalah. She has stated, "I'm into all things spiritual—anything to do with meditation or chants or any of that stuff. I studied Chinese philosophy in school. There's something in the metaphysical that I find very fascinating." She has been a member of the Chinese-American organization Committee of 100 since 2004.

Liu has a son, Rockwell, who was born in 2015 via gestational surrogate. She has stated that surrogacy was the right option for her because, "I was working and I didn't know when I was going to be able to stop." She has decided to raise him as a single parent. She was involved in Tylenol's #HowWeFamily Mother's Day Campaign, which celebrated non-traditional families.

== Performances and works ==
=== Film ===
Year	Title	Role	Notes
1992	Rhythm of Destiny	Donna	
1993	Protozoa	Ari	Short
1995	Bang	Hooker	
1996	Guy	Woman at Newsstand	
1996	Jerry Maguire	Former Girlfriend	
1997	Gridlock'd	Cee-Cee	
1997	City of Industry	Cathi Rose	
1998	Flypaper	Dot	
1998	Love Kills	Kashi	
1999	Payback	Pearl	
1999	True Crime	Toy Shop Girl	
1999	Molly	Brenda	
1999	The Mating Habits of the Earthbound Human	The Female's Friend (Lydia)	
1999	Play It to the Bone	Lia	
2000	Shanghai Noon	Princess Pei Pei	
2000	Charlie's Angels	Alex Munday	
2001	Hotel	Kawika	
2002	Ballistic: Ecks vs. Sever	Agent Sever	
2002	Cypher	Rita Foster	
2002	Chicago	Kitty Baxter	
2003	Charlie's Angels: Full Throttle	Alex Munday	
2003	Kill Bill: Volume 1	O-Ren Ishii	
2004	Kill Bill: Volume 2	O-Ren Ishii	
2004	Kill Bill: The Whole Bloody Affair	O-Ren Ishii	
2004	Mulan II	Mei (voice)	Video
2005	3 Needles	Jin Ping	
2005	Domino	Taryn Mills	
2006	Lucky Number Slevin	Lindsey	
2007	Code Name: The Cleaner	Gina	
2007	Rise: Blood Hunter	Sadie Blake	
2007	Watching the Detectives	Violet	
2008	The Year of Getting to Know Us	Anne	
2008	Kung Fu Panda	Master Viper (voice)	
2008	Tinker Bell	Silvermist (voice)	Video
2009	Tinker Bell and the Lost Treasure	Silvermist (voice)	Video
2010	Tinker Bell and the Great Fairy Rescue	Silvermist (voice)	
2010	Nomads	Susan	
2011	Detachment	Dr. Doris Parker	
2011	The Trouble with Bliss	Andrea	
2011	Kung Fu Panda 2	Master Viper (voice)	
2011	Someday This Pain Will Be Useful to You	Rowena	
2012	Secret of the Wings	Silvermist (voice)	
2012	The Man with the Iron Fists	Madame Blossom	
2013	The Tale of the Princess Kaguya	Lady Sagami (voice)	
2014	The Pirate Fairy	Silvermist (voice)	Video
2014	Tinker Bell and the Legend of the NeverBeast	Silvermist (voice)	Video
2014	Magic Wonderland	Princess Ocean (voice)	
2016	Kung Fu Panda: Secrets of the Scroll	Master Viper (voice)	Short
2016	Kung Fu Panda 3	Master Viper (voice)	
2018	Future World	The Queen	
2018	Set It Up	Kirsten Stevens	
2020	Stage Mother	Sienna	
2022	Strange World	Callisto Mal (voice)	
2023	Shazam! Fury of the Gods	Kalypso	
2024	Presence	Rebecca Payne	
2024	The Tiger's Apprentice	Nu Kua/Cynthia (voice)	
2024	Old Guy	Anata	
2024	Red One	Zoe Harlow	
2025	Rosemead	Irene	Also producer
2026	The Devil Wears Prada 2	Sasha Barnes	
2026	Moonfish		Also executive producer

=== Television ===
Year	Title	Role	Notes
1991	Beverly Hills, 90210	Courtney	Episode: "Pass, Not Pass"
1993	L.A. Law	Mei Lin	Episode: "Foreign Co-Respondent"
1994	Hotel Malibu	Co-Worker	Episode: "Do Not Disturb"
1994	Coach	Nicole Wong	Episode: "It Should Happen to You" & "Out of Control"
1995	Home Improvement	Woman #3	Episode: "Bachelor of the Year"
1995	Hercules: The Legendary Journeys	Oi-Lan	Episode: "The March to Freedom"
1995	ER	Mei-Sun Leow	Recurring cast (season 2)
1996	Nash Bridges	Joy Powell	Episode: "Genesis"
1996	The X-Files	Kim Hsin	Episode: "Hell Money"
1996	High Incident	Officer Whin	2 episodes
1996–1997	Pearl	Amy Li	Main cast
1997	The Real Adventures of Jonny Quest	Melana (voice)	2 episodes
1997	NYPD Blue	Amy Chu	Episode: "A Wrenching Experience"
1997	Riot	Tiffany	Episode: "Empty"
1997	Dellaventura	Yuling Chong	Episode: "Pilot"
1997	Michael Hayes	Alice Woo	Episode: "Slaves"
1998–2002	Ally McBeal	Ling Woo	Main cast (season 2–4), recurring cast (season 5)
2000	MADtv	Herself/Host	Episode: "Episode #6.6"
2000	Live & Kicking	Herself	Episode: "Episode #8.8"
2000	Saturday Night Live	Herself	Episode: "Lucy Liu/Jay-Z"; Cut for Time Sketch: "How the Grinch Stole Christmas"
2001	Sex and the City	Herself	Episode: "Coulda, Woulda, Shoulda"
2001–2002	Futurama	Herself (voice)	2 episodes
2002	Rank	Herself	Episode: "25 Toughest Stars"
2002	VH-1 Behind the Movie	Herself	Episode: "Chicago"
2002	King of the Hill	Tid Pao (voice)	Episode: "Bad Girls, Bad Girls, Whatcha Gonna Do"
2003	Biography	Herself	Episode: "Bernie Mac: TV's Family Man"
2003	Bo' Selecta!	Herself	Episode: "Episode #2.5"
2004	Jackie Chan Adventures	Adult Jade Chan (voice)	Episode: "J2: Rise of the Dragons"
2004	Game Over	Raquel Smashenburn (voice)	Main cast
2004–2005	Joey	Lauren Beck	Recurring cast (season 1)
2004–2007	Maya & Miguel	Maggie Lee (voice)	Recurring cast (season 1–5)
2005	Clifford's Puppy Days	Teacup (voice)	Episode: "Adopt-a-Pup"
2005	The Simpsons	Madam Wu (voice)	Episode: "Goo Goo Gai Pan"
2006	Getaway	Herself/Celebrity Traveller	Episode: "Episode #15.38"
2007	Ugly Betty	Grace Chin	2 episodes
2008	Cashmere Mafia	Mia Mason	Main cast
2008	Ben & Izzy	Yasmine (voice)	Main cast
2008	Little Spirit: Christmas in New York	Leo's Mom (voice)	Television film
2008–2009	Dirty Sexy Money	Nola Lyons	Main cast (season 2)
2009	Afro Samurai: Resurrection	Sio (voice)	Television film
2010	Marry Me	Rae Carter	Episode: "Part 1 & 2"
2010	Ni Hao, Kai-Lan	Bear Queen (voice)	Episode: "Princess Kai-Lan"
2010	Kung Fu Panda Holiday	Master Viper (voice)	Television film
2011	Pixie Hollow Games	Silvermist (voice)	Television film
2011–2016	Kung Fu Panda: Legends of Awesomeness	Master Viper (voice)	Main cast
2012	Southland	Officer Jessica Tang	Recurring cast (season 4)
2012–2019	Elementary	Dr. Joan Watson	Main cast
2013	Pixie Hollow Bake Off	Silvermist (voice)	Television film
2014	Huading Awards	Herself/Host	Main host
2015–2016	Jeopardy!	Herself/Video Clue Presenter	2 episodes
2016	Girls	Detective Mosedale	Episode: "Japan"
2017	Difficult People	Veronica Ford	Recurring cast (season 3)
2017	Sesame Street	Cinderella	Episode: "Cinderella's Slippery Slippers"
2017	Michael Jackson's Halloween	Conformity (voice)	Television film
2018	Animals	Yumi (voice)	Recurring cast (season 3)
2019	Why Women Kill	Simone	Main cast (season 1)
2020	A World of Calm	Herself/Narrator (voice)	Episode: "The Coral City"
2021	Star Wars: Visions	Bandit Leader (voice)	Episode: "The Duel"
2021	Scooby-Doo and Guess Who?	Herself (voice)	Episode: "The Tao of Scoob!"
2021	Curb Your Enthusiasm	Herself	Episode: "The Five-Foot Fence"
2021	Death to 2021	Snook Austin	Television special
2024	A Man in Full	Joyce Newman	Main cast
2024	Jentry Chau vs. the Underworld	Moonie Chau (voice)	6 episodes
2025	The Mighty Nein	Empress Leylas Kryn (voice)	3 episodes
2026	The View	Herself	Episode: "First Episode of 2026 Year"
TBA	Superfakes		Also executive producer

=== Video games ===
Year	Title	Voice role
2001	SSX Tricky	Elise Riggs
2003	Charlie's Angels	Alex Munday
2012	Sleeping Dogs	Vivienne Lu
2023	The Pirate Queen: A Forgotten Legend	Ching Shih

=== Documentary ===
Year	Title	Role	Notes
2004	My Date with Drew	Herself	
2009	Redlight	Narrator	Producer
2019	QT8: The First Eight	Herself	
2022	If You Have	Herself	

=== Director ===
Year	Title	Notes
2014	Meena	Short film
2014–2019	Elementary	7 episodes
2015	Graceland	Episode: "Master of Weak Ties"
2018	Luke Cage	Episode: "Soul Brother#1"
2019	Law & Order: Special Victims Unit	Episode: "Dearly Beloved"
2019	Why Women Kill	Episode: "Marriages Don't Break Up on Account of Murder - It's Just A Symptom That Something Else Is Wrong"
2020	New Amsterdam	Episode: "Hiding Behind My Smile"
2023	American Born Chinese	Episode: "Hot Stuff"

== Art exhibitions ==
Year	Title	Location	Notes
1993	Unraveling	As Liu Yu-ling, Cast Iron Gallery, SoHo, New York, US	Collection of multimedia art pieces, photographs
2006	Antenna	Emotion Picture Gallery, Halifax, Nova Scotia, Canada	Incorporating paint and drawing into photographs. Seven pieces of which two new. March 5 to June 30.
2007	—	Art Basel Miami, Casa Tua in South Beach Miami, US as part of Montblanc's Cutting Edge Art Collection	Painting Escape, a black and white abstraction
2008	je suis. envois-moi	As Yu Ling, Six Friedrich Lisa Ungar, Munich, Germany	Six oil paintings, four prints and ten sculptures. Revenue was donated to UNICEF. May 8 to 31
2010	—	As Yu Ling. Painting included in the Bloomsbury Auctions 20th Century Art and Editions sale in New York, US	Painting
2011	Seventy Two	Salon Vert, London, UK	Personal canvases – hand-stitched and stuck with funny little found objects, pieces of rubbish
2013	Totem	The Popular Institute gallery, Manchester, UK	Series of work on linen, explores the fragility of the human form
2019	Unhomed Belongings	National Museum of Singapore	First museum exhibit, included works by Shubigi Rao
2023	what was	The New York Studio School, New York City, US	Collection of multimedia art pieces, acrylic on canvas, books and found objects

== Awards and nominations ==
Year	Award	Category	Nominated work	Result	Ref.
1997	Screen Actors Guild Award	Outstanding Performance by an Ensemble in a Comedy Series	Ally McBeal	Nominated	
1998	Screen Actors Guild Award	Outstanding Performance by an Ensemble in a Comedy Series	Ally McBeal	Won	
1999	NAACP Image Award	Outstanding Supporting Actress in a Drama Series	Ally McBeal	Nominated	
1999	Primetime Emmy Award	Outstanding Supporting Actress in a Comedy Series	Ally McBeal	Nominated	
1999	Screen Actors Guild Award	Outstanding Performance by a Female Actor in a Comedy Series	Ally McBeal	Nominated	
2000	Screen Actors Guild Award	Outstanding Performance by an Ensemble in a Comedy Series	Ally McBeal	Nominated	
2000	Blockbuster Entertainment Award	Favorite Supporting Actress – Action	Shanghai Noon	Won	
2001	Blockbuster Entertainment Award	Favorite Team	Charlie's Angels	Won	
2001	MTV Movie Award	Best On-Screen Duo	Charlie's Angels	Won	
2001	MTV Movie Award	Best Dressed	Charlie's Angels	Nominated	
2001	Saturn Award	Best Supporting Actress	Charlie's Angels	Nominated	
2003	Broadcast Film Critics Association Award	Best Cast	Chicago	Won	
2003	Phoenix Film Critics Society Award	Best Cast	Chicago	Nominated	
2003	Screen Actors Guild Award	Outstanding Performance by a Cast in a Motion Picture	Chicago	Won	
2003	Teen Choice Award	Choice Hissy Fit	Chicago	Nominated	
2003	MTV Movie Award	Best Dance Sequence	Charlie's Angels: Full Throttle	Nominated	
2004	MTV Movie Award	Best Villain	Kill Bill: Volume 1	Won	
2004	Saturn Award	Best Supporting Actress	Kill Bill: Volume 1	Nominated	
2011	NAACP Image Award	Outstanding Actress in a Television Movie, Mini-Series or Dramatic Special	Marry Me	Nominated	
2012	Muse Award	Best Actress	Elementary	Won	
2013	Prism Awards	Female Performance in a Drama Series Multi-Episode	Elementary	Nominated	
2013	Seoul International Drama Awards	Best Actress	Elementary	Won	
2013	Teen Choice Awards	Choice TV Actress: Action	Elementary	Won	
2013	Critics' Choice Television Award	Best Guest Performer in a Drama Series	Southland	Won	
2013	NAACP Image Award	Outstanding Supporting Actress in a Drama Series	Southland	Nominated	
2015	People's Choice Awards	Favorite TV Crime Drama Actress	Elementary	Nominated	
2016	People's Choice Awards	Favorite TV Crime Drama Actress	Elementary	Nominated	
2017	People's Choice Awards	Favorite TV Crime Drama Actress	Elementary	Nominated	
2024	Golden Raspberry Award	Worst Supporting Actress	Shazam! Fury of the Gods	Nominated	
2024	Primetime Emmy Award	Outstanding Emerging Media Program	The Pirate Queen with Lucy Liu	Nominated	
2025	78th Locarno Film Festival	Lifetime Achievement Award	—N/a	Honoured	

== See also ==
- Chinese Americans in New York City
