= Paul Bojack =

American film director and writer

- Occupations: Film director and writer
- Notable work: Resilience and Glass, Necktie

Paul Bojack is an American film director and writer. His feature films Resilience and Glass, Necktie received acclaim from major publications and distribution in the United States, Canada and abroad. His short films Don't Call Me and The Truth About Mutual Funds screened at various U.S. festivals. The screenplay for Resilience was acquired by the Library of The Academy of Motion Picture Arts and Sciences for its permanent core collection.

== Filmography ==
Feature films

- Resilience
- Glass, Necktie

Short films

- Don't Call Me (The Infidel)
- The Truth About Mutual Funds
