= Winners (American TV series) =

Television series

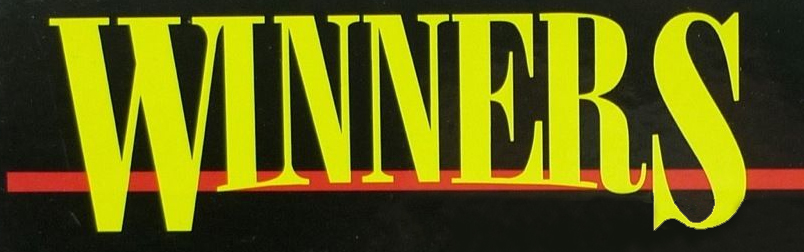
- Genre: Sports highlights
- Starring: Neil Bonnett
- Country of origin: United States
- Original language: English
- No. of seasons: 4

Production
- Running time: 30 minutes

Original release
- Network: TNN (1991-1994)
- Release: April 7, 1991 – July 17, 1994

Related
- Inside NASCAR

Winners is a half-hour motorsports television show hosted by NASCAR driver Neil Bonnett that aired for four seasons from April 7, 1991, to July 17, 1994. The show aired on TNN and each episode profiled a different championship racer. Following Bonnett's death on February 11, 1994, the show was renamed Neil Bonnett's Winners and continued for one additional season with guest hosts.

== Episodes ==
Season 1 (1991)

No. in Series	No. in Season	Driver Featured	Original air date
1	1	Dale Earnhardt (pt. 1)	April 7, 1991
2	2	Dale Earnhardt (pt. 2)	April 14, 1991
3	3	John Force	April 21, 1991
4	4	Davey Allison	April 28, 1991
5	5	Kenny Bernstein	May 5, 1991
6	6	Mark Martin	May 12, 1991
7	7	Rusty Wallace	May 19, 1991
8	8	Rick Mears	May 26, 1991
9	9	Steve Kinser	June 2, 1991
10	10	Joe Amato	June 9, 1991
11	11	Ernie Irvan	June 16, 1991
12	12	Scott Parker	June 23, 1991
13	13	Junior Johnson	June 30, 1991
14	14	Al Unser Jr.	July 7, 1991
15	15	Doug Wolfgang	July 14, 1991
16	16	Bob Senneker	July 21, 1991
17	17	Mario Andretti	July 28, 1991

Season 2 (1992)

No. in Series	No. in Season	Driver Featured	Original air date
18	1	Darrell Waltrip (pt. 1)	April 5, 1992
19	2	Darrell Waltrip (pt. 2)	April 12, 1992
20	3	Jeff Gordon	April 19, 1992
21	4	Roger Mears	April 26, 1992
22	5	Ed McCulloch	May 3, 1992
23	6	Bobby Allison	May 10, 1992
24	7	Pat Austin	May 17, 1992
25	8	Bobby Rahal	May 24, 1992
26	9	Dale Jarrett	May 31, 1992
27	10	Willy T. Ribbs	June 7, 1992
28	11	Ken Schrader	June 14, 1992
29	12	Eddie Hill	June 21, 1992
30	13	Ricky Rudd	June 28, 1992
31	14	Bobby Labonte	July 5, 1992
32	15	Michael Andretti	July 12, 1992
33	16	Hershel McGriff	July 19, 1992
34	17	Kyle Petty	July 26, 1992

Season 3 (1993)

No. in Series	No. in Season	Driver Featured	Original air date
35	1	Neil Bonnett (pt. 1 - Guest Host: Darrell Waltrip)	April 4, 1993
36	2	Neil Bonnett (pt. 2 - Guest Hosts: Dale Earnhardt and Bobby Allison)	April 11, 1993
37	3	Cory McClenathan	April 18, 1993
38	4	Bill Elliott	April 25, 1993
39	5	Cruz Pedregon	May 2, 1993
40	6	Alan Kulwicki	May 9, 1993
41	7	Sammy Swindell	May 16, 1993
42	8	Dave Schultz	May 23, 1993
43	9	Danny Sullivan	May 30, 1993
44	10	Joe Nemechek	June 6, 1993
45	11	Geoff Brabham	June 13, 1993
46	12	Sleepy Tripp	June 20, 1993
47	13	Terry Labonte	June 27, 1993
48	14	Lyn St. James	July 4, 1993
49	15	Emerson Fittipaldi	July 11, 1993
50	16	Larry Morgan	July 18, 1993
51	17	Don Prudhomme	July 25, 1993

Season 4 (1994)

For the fourth season, the show was named Neil Bonnett's Winners. A variety of guest hosts were used including Darrell Waltrip, Rusty Wallace, John Force, Kenny Bernstein, and Lyn St. James. Bonnett was still featured in the show conducting interviews with drivers filmed before his death. The Steve Grissom episode is noteworthy as it was filmed at the Indigo Lake Golf and Tennis Club in Daytona Beach, Florida the day before Bonnett died.

No. in Series	No. in Season	Driver Featured (Guest Host)	Original air date
52	1	Neil Bonnett Tribute (Mike Joy)	February 13, 1994
53	2	Steve Grissom (Darrell Waltrip)	April 3, 1994
54	3	Darrell Gwynn (Kenny Bernstein)	April 10, 1994
55	4	Joe Gibbs (Darrell Waltrip)	April 17, 1994
56	5	Warren Johnson (Kenny Bernstein)	April 24, 1994
57	6	Harry Gant (Rusty Wallace)	May 1, 1994
58	7	Connie Kalitta (John Force)	May 8, 1994
59	8	Morgan Shepherd (Rusty Wallace)	May 15, 1994
60	9	Kenny Bernstein (John Force)	May 22, 1994
61	10	Geoff Bodine (Darrell Waltrip)	May 29, 1994
62	11	Chuck Etchells (Kenny Bernstein)	June 5, 1994
63	12	Ned Jarrett (Darrell Waltrip)	June 12, 1994
64	13	John Force (Kenny Bernstein)	June 19, 1994
65	14	Sterling Marlin (Rusty Wallace)	June 26, 1994
66	15	Dave Blaney (Lyn St. James)	July 3, 1994
67	16	Richard Petty (Rusty Wallace)	July 10, 1994
68	17	Robby Gordon (Lyn St. James)	July 17, 1994
69	18	Series Recap (Ken Squier)	July 23, 1994
