= List of Colgate University people =

This is a list of notable students, alumni, faculty or academic affiliates associated with Colgate University in the United States. As Colgate is an undergraduate school only, all the graduates listed below earned bachelor's degrees there.

== Colgate alumni ==
=== The arts ===
- Charles Addams (1933), New Yorker cartoonist known for macabre drawings; creator of The Addams Family
- Ralph Arlyck (1962), documentary filmmaker who has won many awards at film festivals including Sundance and Cannes
- Ivy Austin (1979), television and radio actress (A Prairie Home Companion, Sesame Street)
- Ken Baker (1992), E! chief news correspondent, author
- Bob Balaban, television and movie actor
- Joe Berlinger (1983), producer (Book of Shadows: Blair Witch 2; documentary Brother's Keeper)
- Edgar Peters Bowron (1965), art historian
- Lin Brehmer (1976), disc jockey and radio personality at WXRT in Chicago
- Broken Lizard, comedy troupe (Super Troopers, Club Dread, Beerfest)
- Steven Cantor (1990), director and producer (DANCER, Chasing Tyson, What Remains, Between Me and My Mind)
- Jay Chandrasekhar (1991), director (Super Troopers, Arrested Development, Club Dread, The Babymakers)
- Rex Cherryman (1916), actor of the stage and screen, most prolific during the 1920s
- Alison Fields (2001), art historian
- Jonathan Glatzer (1991), television writer (Bloodline, Better Call Saul, Succession)
- Ted Griffin (1993), film writer (Ocean's Eleven, Matchstick Men)
- Kevin Heffernan (1990), actor and comedian (Super Troopers, Club Dread, Beerfest)
- Lisa Heller (2018), alternative pop artist and songwriter
- James D. Hornfischer (1987), literary agent
- John J.A. Jannone (1991), composer, animator, film producer (Small Time), founder of Performance and Interactive Media Arts MFA program at Brooklyn College
- Barnet Kellman (1969), producer and director of film and television (Murphy Brown, Mad About You) and multiple Emmy and DGA Award winner
- R. J. Kern (2000), artist and photographer
- Steve Lemme (1991), actor, comedian (Super Troopers, Club Dread, Beerfest)
- Poppy Liu (2013), actress (Sunnyside and Hacks), activist and poet
- Brent Maddock (1972), screenwriter (Short Circuit, Tremors)
- Paul Mariani, poet, professor at Boston College
- Johnny Marks (1931), composer of "Rudolph the Red-Nosed Reindeer"
- Chris Paine (1983), documentary filmmaker (Who Killed the Electric Car?)
- Martin Ransohoff (1949), founder and chief executive officer of Filmways
- John Romano (1970), screenwriter and television writer and producer
- Peter Rowan, bluegrass musician, songwriter ("Panama Red")
- David Rosengarten, chef, author and host of the Food Network show Taste
- Todd Rosenthal (1989), Tony Award-winning scenic designer
- Rachel Scott, fashion designer
- Jeffrey Sharp (1989), producer (Boys Don't Cry, You Can Count On Me, Proof)
- Paul Soter (1991), actor and comedian (Super Troopers, Club Dread, Beerfest)
- Erik Stolhanske (1991), actor and comedian (Super Troopers, Club Dread, Beerfest)
- Gillian Vigman (1994), actor and comedian (Sons and Daughters, MADtv)
- Mel Watkins (1962), writer, editor, social commentator
- Francesca Zambello (1978), director of the Glimmerglass Opera and the Washington National Opera

=== Business ===
- John Acropolis (1909–1952), labor leader
- Warren Anderson (1942), former CEO of Union Carbide
- Jonathan Michael Ansell (1972), current CEO of Fusion Company
- J. Darius Bikoff (1983), creator, Energy Brands, Inc, makers of Glaceau, vitaminwater, and Glaceau smartwater
- Lawrence Bossidy (1957), chairman, CEO, Honeywell International; former CEO, AlliedSignal Inc.
- Bruce Buck (1967), partner, Skadden, Arps, Slate, Meagher & Flom; Chairman, Chelsea Football Club
- Steve Burke (1980), president and CEO, NBCUniversal; former COO, Comcast
- Chase Carey (1976), vice chairman of the 21st Century Fox media conglomerate and the Chairman of the Formula One Group
- Ben Cohen (1973), co-founder and president, Ben & Jerry's Ice Cream (did not graduate)
- John C. Cushman III (1963), founder of Cushman Realty Corporation; CEO and chairman of global transactions, Cushman & Wakefield
- Carmine Di Sibio (1985), global chairman and CEO, Ernst & Young
- Mark Divine (1985), founder of SEALFIT and former United States Navy SEAL
- Robert Duffy (1962), former owner, Duffy Broadcasting
- Cyrus Eaton (1941), chairman, Eaton Corp.
- David Fialkow (1981), co-founder, General Catalyst Partners
- Robert Kindler (1976), vice chairman and global head of mergers and acquisitions, Morgan Stanley
- William Brian Little (1964), founding partner of Forstmann Little & Company, namesake of Little Hall at Colgate University
- Jim Manzi (1973), former CEO, Lotus Development Corp.
- Raymond W. McDaniel Jr. (1980), CEO, Moody's Corporation which operates Moody's Analytics and Moody's Investor Services
- Duncan L. Niederauer (1981), former CEO, NYSE Euronext
- Jack Shafer (1966), former division president, Allied Domecq (Dunkin Donuts, Baskin-Robbins)
- Bill Winters (1983) (CBE), current CEO, Standard Chartered; former co-head of investment banking, JPMorgan Chase

=== Culture ===
- Peter Ackerman (1968), founding chair of the International Center on Nonviolent Conflict
- Jack L. Anson (1948), leader in the American college interfraternity movement; known as "Mr. Fraternity"
- Thomas J. Pilgrim, in 1829, founded the first school in Texas, an all-boys school called the "Austin Academy"
- Justus H. Rathbone, founder of the international fraternal order of the Knights of Pythias
- Tim Walsh (1987), inventor of the game TriBond
- Armand Zildjian (1944), former CEO of the Avedis Zildjian Company, the maker of cymbals, started in 1623 in Istanbul

=== Education ===
- Alida Anderson (1991), widely published academic researcher, author and professor of education at American University
- Jack L. Anson (1948), former executive director, North American Interfraternity Conference
- Shepard B. Clough (1923), professor of European history at Columbia University
- Andrew Dolkart (1973), James Marston Fitch Professor of Historic Preservation at Columbia University
- Emil Frei (1944), physician, oncologist and the Richard and Susan Smith Distinguished Professor of Medicine at Harvard Medical School
- Hall Gardner (1976), professor of International Politics at the American University of Paris
- Charles A S Hall (1965), professor at State University of New York in the College of Environmental Science & Forestry
- A. Thomas McLellan, psychiatry professor at the University of Pennsylvania
- Charles Franklin Phillips (1931), economics professor at Colgate, President of Bates College
- Kevin M. Ross (1994), president of Lynn University
- William J. Simmons (1868), the second president of the eponymous Simmons College of Kentucky
- Herbert Storing (1950), Robert Kent Gooch Professor of Government and Foreign Affairs at the University of Virginia
- Ken Hoyte (2002), - Associate Provost and Assistant Vice President (former Dean, former Director of the Center for Cognitive Development Medgar Evers College - City University of New York

=== Government and politics ===
- William M. Anderson (1937), New York state senator 1953–1989
- Doug Bailey (1954), founder of The Hotline
- Daniel P. Baldwin (?), Indiana attorney general, 1880–1882
- Edward D. Banta (1986), United States Marine Corps lieutenant general (three star), deputy commandant for Installations and Logistics since 2021
- Peter Burleigh (1963), U.S. ambassador to India (acting), 2011–2012
- Kristie Canegallo (2001), White House deputy chief of staff for Policy Implementation, 2014–2017
- Paul Carey (1986), appointed U.S. Securities and Exchange Commission commissioner by President William Jefferson Clinton, confirmed by US Senate in 1997, formerly special assistant to the president for Legislative Affairs at the White House
- James M. Catterson (1980), associate justice, Appellate Division of the New York Supreme Court, First Judicial Department, 2004–2012
- James Colgate Cleveland (1942), member of the U.S. House of Representatives from New Hampshire's 2nd congressional district, 1963–1981
- E. Virgil Conway (1951), former chairman and CEO, New York Metropolitan Transportation Authority, 1995–2001
- James Courter (1963), member of the U.S. House of Representatives from New Jersey's 12th congressional district, 1983–1991
- John Dean, White House counsel, 1970–1973, during the administration of U.S. President Richard Nixon, witness to the Watergate scandal
- Antonio Delgado (1999), U.S. congressman, New York, 2019–2022. lieutenant governor of New York 2022–present
- Kathleen A. Doherty (1985), first female U.S. ambassador to Cyprus, 2015–2019
- John Durham (1972), U.S. attorney for the District of Connecticut, 2018–present
- Perry B. Duryea Jr. (1942), speaker of the New York State Assembly, 1969–1974
- Henry D. Edelman (1970), first president and chief executive officer of the Federal Agricultural Mortgage Corporation
- Peter Feldman (2004), commissioner of the U.S. Consumer Product Safety Commission
- Louis Frey (1955), member of the U.S. House of Representatives from Florida's 9th congressional district, 1973–1979
- Dario Frommer (1974), majority leader of the California State Assembly, 2004–2006
- Alan Frumin (1968), parliamentarian of the United States Senate, 2001–2012
- Drew Gattine (1983), member of the Maine House of Representatives, 2018–present
- Edward M. Grout (1861–1931), lawyer and New York City comptroller
- James Howard Holmes (1965), U.S. ambassador to Latvia, 1998–2001
- Charles Evans Hughes (attended), chief justice, U.S. Supreme Court, 1930–1941
- Gary A. Lee (1960), member of the U.S. House of Representatives from New York's 33rd congressional district, 1979–1983
- Richard Harrington Levet (1916), judge, United States District Court for the Southern District of New York, 1956–1976
- Patricia A. McInerney, judge, First Judicial District of Pennsylvania, 1996–2018
- Monique Mehta, humanitarian and political activist
- Thomas R. Morgan (1952), USMC general, assistant commandant of the United States Marine Corps, 1986–1988
- Darryl Nirenberg, U.S. ambassador to Romania
- Harlow S. Orton (1837), member of the Wisconsin Supreme Court 1878–1895, author of Vosburg v. Putney
- Sarah Peake (1979), member of the Massachusetts House of Representatives from the 4th Barnstable district
- Peter N. Perretti Jr. (1953), attorney general of New Jersey 1989–1990
- Peter Peyser (1943), former U.S. congressman 1971–1977, 1979–1983
- Adam Clayton Powell (1930), New York congressman and civil rights leader
- William P. Rogers (1934), United States secretary of state, United States attorney general
- Mary Gay Scanlon (1980), U.S. congresswoman, Pennsylvania 2019–present
- Richard B. Spencer (1997), alt-right leader and white nationalist (transferred to the University of Virginia)
- Peter Tarnoff (1958), undersecretary of state, United States Department of State
- Dean P. Taylor (1925), U.S. congressman, New York 1943–1961
- Donald S. Taylor (1919), judge, New York State Supreme Court, Appellate Div. 1948–1968
- Claudia Tenney (1983), U.S. congresswoman, New York 2017–2019, 2021–2023 (NY-22) 2023–present (NY-24)
- Ralph W. Thomas (1883), New York State senator 1910–1914
- Gary Trauner (1980), politician from Wyoming
- Dennis Vacco (1974), 62nd New York State attorney general
- Martha M. Walz (1983), Democratic member of the Massachusetts House of Representatives
- Perry Warren (1984), member, Pennsylvania House of Representatives, 2017–present
- F. Clifton White (1940), political consultant, best remembered as the moving force behind the Draft Goldwater Committee
- Elizabeth A. Wolford (1989), United States district judge of the United States District Court for the Western District of New York

=== Journalism ===
- Jack Belden (1932), war correspondent, Life, Time, author, China Shakes the World
- Gloria Borger (1974), CNN, U.S. News & World Report, Washington Week, CBS special correspondent
- Monica Crowley (1990), Richard Nixon biographer; political and international affairs analyst, Fox
- Thomas A. Dine (1962), president, Radio Free Europe
- Jeff Fager (1977), chairman, CBS News; executive producer, 60 Minutes
- Howard Fineman (1970), chief political correspondent, senior editor, Newsweek
- Michael Gordon (1972), chief military correspondent, bestselling author, New York Times
- Chris Hedges (1979), war correspondent, New York Times
- Bud Hedinger (1969), talk radio host
- Michael Hiltzik (1973), Pulitzer Prize-winning journalist, Los Angeles Times
- David Lloyd (1983), sportscaster for ESPN
- Austin Murphy (1983), senior writer, Sports Illustrated
- Kevin Phillips (1961), publisher, American Political Research Corp.
- Andy Rooney (1942), 60 Minutes commentator, columnist
- Rob Stone (1991), reporter and commentator, Fox Soccer
- Priit Vesilind (1964), National Geographic Society expeditions editor and senior writer
- Bob Woodruff (1983), ABC News foreign correspondent

=== Literature ===
- Bill Barich (1965), author of Laughing in the Hills (1980) and Hard to Be Good; Big Dreams: Into the Heart of California
- Philip Beard (1985), novelist
- Frederick Busch (1967), author, Fairchild Professor of Literature at Colgate (1976–2003)
- Pamela Druckerman (1991), novelist, Bringing Up Bébé
- Kim Edwards (1981), novelist
- James D. Hornfischer (1987), author, The Last Stand of the Tin Can Sailors, Neptune's Inferno, The Fleet at Flood Tide
- Stephanie LaCava (2004), author of An Extraordinary Theory of Objects: A Memoir of an Outsider in Paris
- Michael Lassell (1969), writer and editor
- John McGahern, novelist, adjunct professor of English at Colgate (1981–2006)
- Theodore Pratt, writer, journalist, author of numerous novels set in Florida
- Nathaniel Schmidt (1887), author, Baptist minister, educator and orientalist

=== Religion ===
- David Standish Ball (1950), bishop of Episcopal Diocese of Albany, NY
- George Ricker Berry (1897), professor of Semitic Languages; professor emeritus of Colgate-Rochester Divinity School
- James A. Corbett (1954), co-founder of the Sanctuary movement
- Harry Emerson Fosdick (1900), pastor, author
- John Tecumseh Jones (attended 1829), Native American leader, Ottawa translator, Baptist minister, anti-slavery advocate in Kansas, founder of Ottawa University
- Joseph Endom Jones (1876), Baptist minister, professor at Virginia Union University
- Philip L. Wickeri, adviser to the archbishop of Hong Kong for theological and historical studies, professor of Church History at Hong Kong Sheng Kung Hui Ming Hua Theological College

=== Science, technology and medicine ===
- Oswald Avery (1900), helped lead groundbreaking DNA research
- Albert Allen Bartlett (1944), physicist at University of Colorado Boulder, super conducting quantum interference device; arithmetic, population & energy
- David DeWitt (1970), technical fellow at Microsoft, leading the Microsoft Jim Gray Systems Lab at Madison, Wisconsin
- Gerald Fischbach (1960), scientific director overseeing the Simons Foundation Autism Research Initiative
- Emil Frei (1944), helped establish the concept of combinatorial chemotherapy as a way of treating cancer
- Alan A. Jones (1966), leading researcher in the field of NMR and polymer physics and professor of chemistry at Clark University
- Jay Jordan, president and CEO of OCLC
- Cris Kobryn (1974), technologist, system architect, entrepreneur
- Rudolph Leibel (1963), scientist at Columbia University whose co-discovery at Rockefeller University of the hormone leptin has had a major role in the area of understanding human obesity
- Cyrus Colton MacDuffee (1917), former president of the Mathematical Association of America
- A. Thomas McLellan (1970), executive director of the Treatment Research Institute in Philadelphia
- Kevin Padian (1972), president of the National Center for Science Education
- H. Guyford Stever (1938), former head of National Science Foundation/NASA

=== Sports ===
- Ockie Anderson (1916), All-American football player and coach for the Buffalo All Americans Champion in cross country and indoor track (3000m)
- Peter Baum (2013), 2012 Tewaaraton Trophy winner and first overall pick of the 2012 Major League Lacrosse draft
- Kathryn Bertine (1997), professional racing cyclist, writer and former figure skater and triathlete
- Jamaal Branch (2005), running back, New Orleans Saints practice squad, winner of the 2003 Walter Payton Award for Division I-AA football
- Tad Brown (1986), CEO, Houston Rockets
- Tom Burgess (1986), former quarterback, Ottawa Rough Riders and Winnipeg Blue Bombers, MVP of 1990 Grey Cup
- Joe Castiglione (1968), former TV play-by-play man for the Cleveland Indians, currently radio play-by-play man for the Boston Red Sox
- Frank Castleman (1906), while at Colgate, won the silver medal in the 200 metre hurdles at the 1904 Summer Olympics
- Beth Combs, former basketball coach
- Brad Dexter (1996), former minor-league hockey player, assistant coach of the Princeton men's hockey team
- Kiira Dosdall (2009), retired professional ice hockey player for the Metropolitan Riveters of the National Women's Hockey League (2015–23)
- Chris Dunn, Olympic high jumper (Munich 1972), NCAA Indoor High Jump Champion (1972)
- Nate Eachus (2011), running back for the Kansas City Chiefs
- Rich Erenberg (1984), former running back, Pittsburgh Steelers
- Dan Fortmann (1936), Hall of Fame guard, Chicago Bears in the 1930s
- Adonal Foyle (1998), center, Orlando Magic
- David Gagnon (1990), former goalie, Detroit Red Wings
- Kenny Gamble (1988), former running back, Kansas City Chiefs, also an assistant athletic director at Colgate and executive with Reebok
- Milt Graham (1958), former professional football player, Boston Patriots
- Greg Hadley (2010), former linebacker and current coach for St. Lawrence University
- Nick Hennessey (2009), offensive lineman for the Buffalo Bills
- Marvin Hubbard (1968), fullback for the Oakland Raiders (1969–1975), Detroit Lions (1977)
- Ryan Johnston (2016), defenseman for the Montreal Canadiens
- Greg Manusky (1988), former linebacker, Washington Redskins, Minnesota Vikings, and Kansas City Chiefs, now defensive coordinator for the San Francisco 49ers
- Andy McDonald (2000), center for the St. Louis Blues
- David McIntyre (2010), Canadian professional ice hockey forward, currently with the Houston Aeros of the American Hockey League
- Lyndsay Meyer (1996), competitive ski mountaineer
- Mike Milbury (1974), former defenseman for the Boston Bruins, former coach for Boston and the New York Islanders, former general manager of the Islanders, and TV analyst for ESPN, NBC, TSN, and NESN
- Joey Mormina (2005), defenseman for the Pittsburgh Penguins
- Cory Murphy (2001), defenseman for the New Jersey Devils
- Mark Murphy (1977), former safety, Washington Redskins, former athletic director at Colgate and Northwestern University, president of the Green Bay Packers
- Clem Neacy (1924), former end and tackle, Milwaukee Badgers and Chicago Bears
- John Orsi (1932), All-American football player, College Football Hall of Fame member
- Bill Parcells (1958), NFL head coach, Pro Football Hall of Fame member
- Babe Parnell, National Football League player
- Steve Poapst (1991), former defenseman, Chicago Blackhawks
- Will Rayman (2020), American-Israeli basketball player for Hapoel Haifa in the Israeli Basketball Premier League
- Doug Reffue (1992), vice president for operations for Sports Club/LA
- Mike Reidy (2012), soccer player, USL
- Eugene Robinson (1985), former safety, Carolina Panthers, Atlanta Falcons, Green Bay Packers, and Seattle Seahawks
- Lauren Schmetterling (2010), Olympic gold medalist, 2016 Summer Olympics in Rio de Janeiro
- Dick Sisler (1942), professional baseball player and manager
- Steve Spott (1990), assistant coach Dallas Stars (NHL)
- Ebba St. Claire (1941), professional baseball player
- Mark van Eeghen (1974), former running back, Oakland Raiders
- Ernest Vandeweghe (1949), former player for New York Knicks, former surgeon for Los Angeles Lakers
- Ryan Vena (2000), professional arena football player (quarterback) for Wilkes-Barre/Scranton Pioneers
- Chris Wagner (2014), professional forward for Anaheim Ducks
- Kyle Wilson (2006), center for Columbus Blue Jackets
- Jesse Winchester (2008), center for Ottawa Senators

== Current faculty ==
- Anthony Aveni, professor of astronomy and anthropology, one of the founders of archaeoastronomy
- Peter Balakian, professor of English, poet and writer, awarded the Pulitzer Prize for Poetry in 2016
- Thomas J. Balonek, professor of physics and astronomy
- DeWitt Godfrey, associate professor art and art history
- Joscelyn Godwin, professor of musicology
- Graham Russell Gao Hodges, professor of history and Africana & Latin American studies
- Amy Leventer, professor of geology, Antarctic researcher
- Beth Parks, associate professor of physics & astronomy, editor-in-chief of American Journal of Physics

== List of presidents ==
- Nathaniel Kendrick (1836–1848)
- Stephen William Taylor (1851–1856)
- George Washington Eaton (1856–1868)
- Ebenezer Dodge (1868–1890)
- George William Smith (1895–1897)
- George Edmands Merrill (1899–1908)
- Elmer Burritt Bryan (1909–1921)
- George Barton Cutten (1922–1942)
- Everett Needham Case (1942–1962)
- Vincent MacDowell Barnett Jr. (1963–1969)
- Thomas A. Bartlett (1969–1977)
- George D. Langdon Jr. (1978–1988)
- Neil R. Grabois (1988–1999)
- Charles Karelis (1999–2001)
- Rebecca Chopp (2002–2009)
- Jeffrey Herbst (2010–2015)
- Brian Casey (2016–present)
