= DePauw University Delta Zeta discrimination controversy =

2006 sorority controversy

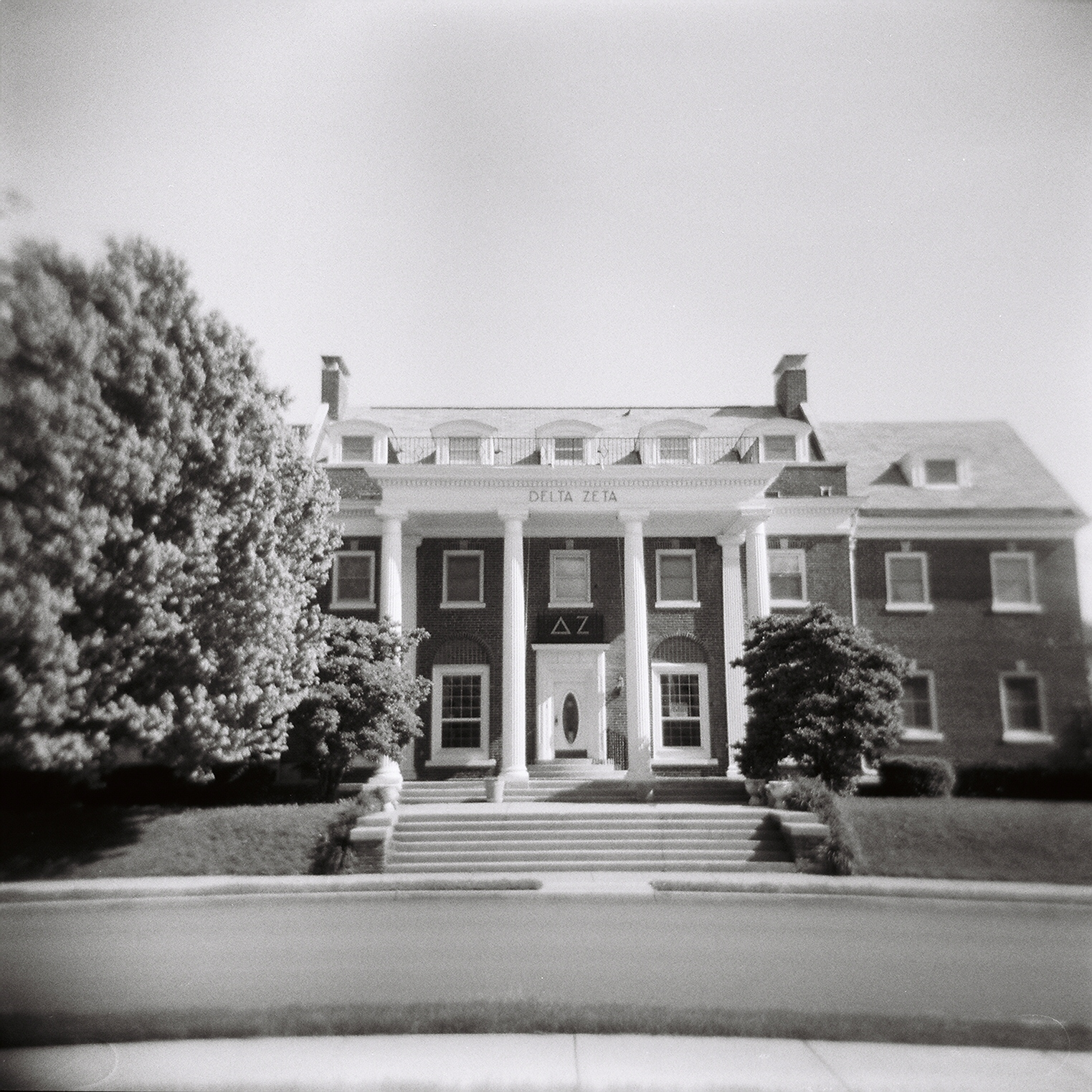
The former Delta Zeta house on the DePauw University campus

The DePauw University Delta Zeta discrimination controversy occurred at the end of 2006 when the Delta Zeta national leadership was criticized after The New York Times published an article accusing the sorority of deactivating certain members of the Delta chapter at DePauw University based on their perceived attractiveness. The controversy made national headlines, resulting in the chapter's closing and various legal actions.

== Background ==
Founded in 1902, the Delta chapter of Delta Zeta (ΔΖ) was the sorority's second oldest active and fourth oldest chapter overall. Despite its long history at DePauw, however, the Delta chapter in recent years had struggled with declining membership and acquired a negative reputation on campus.

In August 2006, national representatives, concerned about the Delta chapter's inability to recruit new members, announced that the chapter would be closed at the end of the 2006–7 school year if they failed to increase their numbers substantially or elected not to participate in active recruitment or informal rush. At a school where an estimated 70% of the student body belongs to a fraternity or sorority, the Delta Zeta house was two-thirds empty. A DePauw psychology professor's survey of students found that members of the sorority were considered "socially awkward." The sorority attracted "brainy women", many with science and math majors, along with the gifted and disabled. Many current members felt that it might be in their best interest to let the chapter close without recruiting new members.

In anticipation of the sorority's 2009 centennial, its executive director, Cynthia Winslow Menges, planned to close the chapter temporarily. In September 2006, however, the university informed Delta Zeta headquarters that if the chapter were closed, it would not be allowed to reopen on the sorority's chosen timetable, out of fairness to other National Panhellenic Conference (NPC) sororities with dormant chapters at DePauw. Instead, Delta Zeta would have to wait for the campus to open for NPC extension and then compete for consideration with whichever NPC groups were not represented at DePauw.

== Membership review ==
In an emergency attempt to salvage the chapter, a team of national representatives came to the university in November 2006 to conduct a membership review, interviewing women individually about their dedication to the sorority. (Delta Zeta representatives have repeatedly asserted that they undertook the review on the advice of the university, whereas DePauw officials "vehemently" deny this.) A few days after the interview process, the national team with women from Delta Zeta's Epsilon chapter at nearby Indiana University held a recruiting event in the house, where 25 of the chapter members were asked not to participate and to remain out of sight. A February 25, 2007 article in The New York Times quoted one former Delta chapter member as saying, "They had these unassuming freshman girls downstairs with these plastic women from Indiana University, and 25 of my sisters hiding upstairs. It was so fake, so completely dehumanized."

Subsequently, 23 out of 35 active members, including Delta chapter's president, were assigned early alumna status and asked to vacate the house. Four members resigned in September after the review was announced, and three others who were living off-campus at the time have claimed they were never contacted about their membership status. Former members later told university officials that when they first learned of the review, they were led to believe that they would be allowed to decide for themselves whether to continue their involvement in the sorority. However, in early December 2006—shortly before finals week at DePauw—national headquarters sent out letters informing members that they were either still active or had been recommended for alumnae status and were to move out of the house by the end of January 2007. Each new alumna received $300 to cover the difference between sorority housing and campus housing; nonetheless, many of the women were unsure that they would find another place to live. The university eventually found housing for the evicted women.

== Effects ==
In the months following the review, reports began appearing on the Internet alleging that the evicted women had been threatened with expulsion if they refused to take alumnae status and accusing the national team of choosing which women got to stay active according to their perceived attractiveness. In response to growing criticism from DePauw students and administrators, Delta Zeta representatives stated that the women who had been asked to leave lacked commitment to the chapter's future, but according to The New York Times report, the 23 evicted members included all of the overweight women in the chapter, as well as three of the four minorities; conversely, the twelve women invited to stay "were slender and popular with fraternity men," but eventually half of that group also resigned as a show of solidarity.

In the days following The New York Times article, other national media outlets picked up the story, including CNN, CBS News, Good Morning America, MSNBC, Newsweek, and People. On February 19, 2007, DePauw president Robert G. Bottoms formally reprimanded Delta Zeta's national headquarters for its actions and instituted a new rule requiring that all housed fraternities and sororities at the university provide housing for their members throughout the school year, except when risk-management violations or behavioral problems make eviction necessary.

During a February 26 interview with Paula Zahn of CNN, Cynthia Menges, then executive director of Delta Zeta, denied the chapter's allegations of discrimination based on religion, race, or ethnicity and maintained that the 23 affected women left voluntarily. She also justified the reorganization because the chapter had voted to close anyway, and that DePauw officials would not guarantee Delta Zeta an opportunity to return shortly. Asked whether appearance had played a part in the evictions, Menges did not directly respond.

On March 1, 2007, Delta Zeta headquarters announced that it would no longer respond to media inquiries about the DePauw chapter. As of March 6, the sorority's national website featured an apology to the evicted students but still includes a letter calling into question those women's loyalty to the chapter and blaming them in part for its recent struggles.

On March 12, 2007, Bottoms withdrew Delta Zeta's status as a recognized campus organization, stating that the national organization's values, as demonstrated by the evictions, are not compatible with the university's. The sorority was required to leave DePauw following the conclusion of the 2006–2007 academic year. Delta Zeta responded with a statement on the front page of its website expressing disappointment with Bottoms's decision and reiterating its position that the review was necessary, but conceding that the 23 alumnae should probably have been notified of their change in status in person and at a different point in the school year. Bottoms characterized The New York Times story as inaccurate and a misrepresentation of the school.

As of December 2021, Delta Zeta has not returned to the DePauw campus. Meanwhile, ten Delta chapter alumnae formed a college-sanctioned local student organization, Psi Lambda Xi (ΨΛΞ), to become a new local sorority. A founder said, "The founding purpose of the sorority is to promote a positive self-image in each other, the University, and the community."

== Legal actions ==
On March 29, 2007, it was reported in The New York Times that Delta Zeta's national office, based in Oxford, Ohio, had filed suit in U.S. Federal District Court in Indianapolis against DePauw University for expelling the sorority from campus. The university said the lawsuit completely lacks merit. "From the beginning, DePauw University has acted to protect its students." In November 2007, Delta Zeta withdrew the lawsuit and DePauw agreed that the sorority would have the opportunity to compete with other sororities attempting to colonize a chapter on the campus beginning in the academic year 2010–2011. However, Delta Zeta elected not to compete for the 2010–2011 academic year and, as of May 2010 has no plans to do so.

Meanwhile, eight former members hired an attorney seeking an apology and other corrective actions from Delta Zeta's national office.

In 1999, eight former members of the sorority's Alpha Theta chapter at the University of Kentucky sued the national organization, claiming they had been forced to take early alumnae status based on their appearance during a similar reorganization. Delta Zeta settled the lawsuit in 2001. The attorney who represented the women from Kentucky called the sorority's actions toward the DePauw chapter "egregious".

== Student response ==
=== DePauw University ===
In response to the controversy, Delta chapter's six remaining active members issued a statement alleging that their chapter had been misrepresented in the original article in The New York Times. They claimed that one of their current members had offered an opposing viewpoint to Sam Dillon, the reporter who wrote the story, but that her comments were not used. They went on to deny the allegations that "race, weight, and academic majors were used as criteria in the membership review process".

Concern was expressed by other students that at a meeting held February 2, 2007, an educational leadership consultant from Delta Zeta national stated, "Image, I'm not going to lie to you, is a huge part of it."

Since the reorganization and before the national publicity, eight of eleven freshman women who received invitations to join Delta Zeta during formal recruitment chose not to become members. One said, "We all got together and talked about it and tried to have an open mind. But all of us were really against what they did, and we didn't want to be associated with it."

=== Texas Christian University ===
Texas Christian University selected Gamma Phi Beta International Sorority over Delta Zeta as a new member of its Panhellenic community on February 28, 2007. "It will be a concern because if you bring on a sorority with nationwide conflict," said the Panhellenic director of recruitment, "that's taking a big liability." The Panhellenic president stated that the recent events at DePauw were a factor in the decision.

== See also ==
- DePauw University Greek organizations
- Fits and Starts
