= George Merrill =

George Merrill may refer to:

- George Merrill (Medal of Honor) (1847–1925), American Civil War soldier
- George Merrill (life partner of Edward Carpenter) (1867–1928), lifelong companion of English poet and gay activist Edward Carpenter
- George Merrill (songwriter) (born 1956), American songwriter
- George Sargent Merrill (1837–1900), U.S. Commander-in-Chief of the Grand Army of the Republic
- George W. Merrill (1837–1914), American politician and diplomat
- George Edmands Merrill (1846–1908), American Baptist clergyman and educator
- George F. Merrill (1847–1941), former member of the Wisconsin Legislature
- George Perkins Merrill (1854–1929), American geologist
- George Knox Merrill (1864–1927), American lichenologist
