= George Edmonds =

George Edmonds may refer to:

- George Edmonds (footballer) (1893–1989), association footballer for Watford and Wolverhampton Wanderers
- George W. Edmonds (1864–1939), U.S. Representative from Pennsylvania
- George Edmonds (lawyer) (1788–1868), English teacher, lawyer, and scholar

== See also ==
- George F. Edmunds (1828–1919), Republican senator from Vermont
- George Edmands Merrill (1846–1908), American Baptist clergyman and educator
