= Grabois =

Grabois is a surname. Notable people with this surname include:

- Daniel Grabois, American musician
- Juan Grabois (born 1983), Argentine social leader and activist
- Maurício Grabois (1912–1973), Brazilian politician
- Neil R. Grabois (1935–2024), American mathematician
- Stuart GraBois, retired American prosecuting attorney
