= Greg Hadley =

American football player (born 1988)

Gregory Dean Hadley (born March 15, 1988, in Syracuse, New York) is an American former football linebacker, current coach and concussion prevention advocate. He is the son of Michael and Clee Hadley.

== High school ==
Hadley attended Christian Brothers Academy in Syracuse where he was coached by Joseph Casamento. He was a 3-year lettermen and captain his senior year. In his final year he recorded 147 tackles, nine sacks and one blocked punt.

== College ==
Greg attended Colgate University where he majored in Studio Art and a minor in Theater. He played under Head Coach Dick Biddle.

=== Freshman (2006) ===
He earned his first varsity letter playing in six games and recorded one tackle against Holy Cross. Hadley missed the middle part of the season due to contracting mono.

=== Sophomore (2007) ===
Greg started all 11 games at middle linebacker. He was the third on the team in tackling with recording 62.

=== Junior (2008) ===
In his Junior year he was named second team all-Patriot League. He started all 12 games and was the leading tackler with 80. He was named Patriot League Defensive Player of the Week against Lafayette College and Lehigh, College Sporting News' National All-Star of the week against Lafayette.

=== Senior (2009) ===
Hadley played in all 11 games in his Senior year at Colgate. He recorded 67 tackles and was named all-Pariot League.

== Post-college ==
In 2009 Hadley became a concussion awareness supporter after suffering from 4 diagnosed concussions during his college career. Hadley works with Dr. Ann McKee, a Boston University neurological researcher on chronic traumatic encephalopathy. Hadley is a strong advocate for safety changes and concussion awareness on all football levels. In 2010, following a short career playing professionally for the Tampere Saints (Tampere, Finland), Hadley was a Defensive Assistant at the University of Rhode Island. He coached the cornerbacks and assisted with special teams as well as film breakdown. In February 2011, Hadley joined the coaching staff of the St. Lawrence University football team as the linebacker coach. In the Summer of 2012, Hadley was promoted to Co-Defensive Coordinator at St. Lawrence University. Following a two-year stint coaching linebackers at Ithaca College (Ithaca, NY), Hadley was named Defensive Coordinator at Endicott College (Beverly, MA) in 2015.
