= Jack L. Anson =

American fraternity leader

- Born: Jack Lee Anson; August 3, 1924; Huntington, Indiana, US
- Died: September 15, 1990 (aged 66)
- Education: Colgate University
- Occupation: Executive Director
- Employers: Phi Kappa Tau; North American Interfraternity Conference

Jack Lee Anson (August 3, 1924 – September 15, 1990) was a leader in the American college interfraternity movement. Under his leadership as the first executive director of the North American Interfraternity Conference, college fraternities and sororities gained an exemption from Title IX legislation to preserve the single-sex nature of the organizations.

== Early life ==
Anson was born in Huntington, Indiana, on August 3, 1924. He graduated from high school there. He worked as a sports reporter and editor for the Huntington Herald-Press. He then served in the U.S. Army during World War II and the Korean War.

He graduated from Colgate University in 1948 where he was a member of Phi Kappa Tau fraternity. He did graduate work at Miami University in Oxford, where he started a professional association with Phi Kappa Tau.

== Career ==
He spent his entire career in the service of the North American college fraternity movement. Starting in 1948, he worked for Phi Kappa Tau in a number of positions of twenty years, from field secretary, to assistant national secretary and then executive director. He was also the editor of the fraternity's publication, The Laurel. He was president of the Fraternity Communications Association in 1960 to 1961.

In 1971, Anson became the first executive director of the National Interfraternity Conference, a position he held until his retirement in 1982. His most significant achievement was his leadership in the effort to gain an exemption from Title IX to retain the single-sex character of American college fraternities and sororities. When Title IX was first passed, it looked as though student organizations such as fraternities and sororities would have to become co-educational. With the help of Senator Birch Bayh, a fraternity man and other friendly members of Congress, an exemption was gained that has not been in significant jeopardy of repeal since that time.

He was the author of The Golden Jubilee History of Phi Kappa Tau (1957) and, A Diamond Jubilee History of the National Interfraternity Conference: 75 Glorious Years (1984). At the time of his death he was serving as editor of the current edition of Baird's Manual of American College Fraternities.

== Personal life ==
Anson raised pedigree dogs and was president of the Cincinnati Kennel Club. He served as a trustee of the National Interfraternity Council. He was also a director of the Phi Kappa Tau Foundation and was it president-elect at the time of his death.

Anson died from a heart attack on September 15, 1990, on his farm in Bright, Indiana.

== Legacy and honors ==
In 1982, he was awarded the key to the city of Indianapolis, and the Indiana's Sagamore of the Wabash award. In 1985, Anson won the Interfraternity world's highest honor, the Gold Medal of the North American Interfraternity Conference. In addition, he was widely honored by men's and women's Greek-letter organizations for his contributions to the North American college fraternity movement including awards from Lambda Chi Alpha, Delta Gamma and others.

Starting in 1982, the Association of Fraternity/Sorority Advisors began presenting its annual Jack L. Anson Award; Anson was the awards first recipient. The National Interfraternal Foundation presents Jack L. Anson Fellowships. The National Interfraternity Council established the Jack Anson graduate study fellowship. The Phi Kappa Tau Foundation formed the Jack L. Anson Scholarship in 1990, now called the Jack L. Anson Undergraduate Award.
