= Tim Walsh (game inventor) =

American game designer (born 1964)

Tim Walsh (born December 25, 1964) is an American game inventor, writer and former sportsman.

He attended Colgate University, with a major in biology and minors in art and art history. Here, he invented the game TriBond together with classmates Dave Yearick, and Ed Muccini in 1990. He invented Blurt! in 1994. After inventing TriBond he got a job at the game's license holder, Patch Products, as Corporate VP of Product Development and Marketing.

At college, Walsh played varsity football and was a baseball pitcher. He also played baseball in Mexico, as well as for the barnstorming team Indianapolis Clowns in 1988.

He later pursued a career as a game writer. He self-published the book The Playmakers: Amazing Origins of Timeless Toys after it was refused by publishers. It was later picked up by Andrews McMeel Universal and published as Timeless Toys. A history book about the company Wham-O, Wham-O Super-Book: Celebrating 60 Years Inside the Fun Factory, followed on Chronicle Books in 2008. In his book Monopoly: The World's Most Famous Game—And How it Got that Way, Philip Orbanes called Timeless Toys "a must-have reference among toy and game collectors, include Monopolyphiles".

Walsh currently lives in Sarasota, Florida.
