= TriBond =

Board game

- Genres: Trivia
- Players: 3 or more players or teams
- Setup time: 1-2 minutes
- Playing time: 30 minutes to 1 hour
- Chance: Low, dice rolling for movement and category
- Skills: Trivia knowledge, Lateral Thinking

TriBond is a board game that has sold over 3 million copies in 14 countries since its release in 1990. It requires players to determine a common bond between three subjects. It follows in the tradition of Trivial Pursuit, Outburst and other adult boardgames that require a wide range of knowledge but TriBond requires some problem solving ability as well.

== History ==
TriBond was invented by Tim Walsh, Dave Yearick, and Ed Muccini. The idea first came to them in 1987 while they were students at Colgate University. The inspiration came when they learned that John Haney and Ed Werner, who invented Trivial Pursuit, had also attended Colgate. They wanted to invent a game that provided an intellectual challenge but also had a broader appeal than games of straight trivia questions that had been very popular in the 80's. Within two years, they had their first prototype of TriBond and were ready to market the game.

Initial marketing for the game was difficult. Parker Brothers, Mattel, Tyco and several other game companies all turned TriBond down. At the time they were working with Patch Products to manufacture the game. Tim Walsh talked them into hiring him on as a marketing manager to sell TriBond. With some clever promoting techniques they were able to sell around 150,000 copies of TriBond in 1993. By 1999 TriBond had sold over 1.5 million copies. In 2015, for TriBond's 25th Anniversary, Tim Walsh entered into business with Everest Toys in Ancaster, Ontario, Canada. Together the game was revamped to have a more party game type of feel, by adding more fun and exciting ways to play.

Since its release, there have been six major releases of TriBond:

- TriBond (Original) (1990)
- TriBond Diamond Edition (1998)
- The Best of TriBond (2001)
- TriBond 2005
- Will Shortz TriBond (2009)
- Everest Toys TriBond (2015)

== The game ==
The main feature of the game is the TriBond "Threezer". This word was invented by the maker of TriBond to describe the three word clues the players must analyze and determine what all three have in common. Some of the threezers are not difficult while others are quite challenging. The threezers originally came in four different categories listed below.

- Entertainment
- Sports and Recreation
- Academics
- Miscellaneous

With the TriBond 2005 release, the Miscellaneous category was removed and some new categories added. Listed below are the 2005 categories.

- Entertainment
- Academics
- Wordplay
- Loose Connections
- Sports

TriBond can be played by individual players or teams. Each game comes with 12 game pieces, three for each team. The gameboard is unusual, being triangular, and has three start and finish tracks that go around each corner of the board with 17 spaces for each track. All players place each of their three-game pieces on the starting points for each track. Two dice are used, one being a regular, numbered dice and the other a category dice. A player rolls the dice and one of the opposing players will read to them the threezer for the category they rolled. If they are able to guess the common bond they will advance one of their game pieces the number of spaces rolled on the numbered die and continue playing until they answer incorrectly. This rule changed in the 2005 version to 'one question, one turn'. Unless the player lands on a challenge square, it is the next team's turn regardless of whether or not they answered correctly.

If the player lands on a green challenge square they can 'challenge' another player who's ahead of them in one of the three tracks. In the first version of TriBond, the card would identify which of the four categories would be the challenge threezer. Starting with the 2005 Edition each card lists an additional challenge threezer along with the other categories. A third player will read the challenge threezer to the challenger and the player he challenged. Whoever shouts out the correct answer first wins the challenge. If the challenger wins, he gets to swap places on the board with the other player, otherwise both players' pieces remain as they are. Challenging is not always possible; if the player is ahead on all three tracks there is no point in offering a challenge to another player.

The first player or team to move all their game pieces around the tracks wins the game.

== Game show ==
An unsold pilot for a television version of TriBond (which was hosted by Graham Elwood) was filmed by Game Show Network in early 2002.

Three contestants competed in the game show, which was played in three rounds:

- Round 1 – Three items were presented, and the contestant who buzzed in had to determine the common bond. 25 points were awarded for each correct bond.
- Round 2 – The first two items were presented, and the contestant who buzzed in had to determine the third item (which had two possible answers) as well as the common bond. 50 points were awarded for each correct bond. At the end of this round, the lowest-scoring contestant was eliminated from the game.
- Round 3 – Two contestants competed in this round. The first item was presented, and the contestant who buzzed in had to determine both the second item (which had two possible answers) and the third item (which had three possible answers) as well as the common bond. 100 points were awarded for each correct bond.

At the end of the third round, the contestant with the highest number of points was declared the winner and advanced to the bonus round. If there was a tie at the end of the second or third rounds, a tiebreaking bond would be played between the tied contestants under that particular round's rules; the first contestant to buzz in with a correct answer advanced to the next round.

=== Endgame ===
The contestant who won the main game was given 45 seconds to identify seven bonds; a correct answer on each bond reveals one of the items that is present in the final bond. The contestant can pass on each bond and return to it, depending on the time remaining. Once the 45 seconds had expired, the contestant was told which three of the seven answers shared a common bond with each other; the contestant was given 10 additional seconds to determine the common bond shared by those answers. Contestants correctly identifying the final common bond wins $10,000.

== Reviews ==
- Games #115
