= Henry D. Edelman =

Henry D. Edelman (born 1948) was the first president and chief executive officer of the Federal Agricultural Mortgage Corporation, a United States government sponsored enterprise (also known as Farmer Mac) that serves as a secondary market in loans for agricultural real estate and rural housing.

== Early life ==
Edelman graduated from Colgate University in 1970, and participated in a special program that enabled him to receive both his B. A. and M. A. at the same time. He also attended Eton College in England after graduating high school a year early. He received a law degree from Cornell University in 1973.

== Career ==
Edelman entered private practice for three years before joining the legal staff of General Motors. He left the company ten years later, having worked his way up to the position of director of corporate finance, and became vice president of government finance at Citicorp. Six months after joining Citicorp, he left to join Paine Webber as first vice president of the company's government finance group.

Edelman first came to Farmer Mac in July 1988 as a financial consultant for its interim board. The agency was created by the Agricultural Credit Act of 1987, and Edelman's initial endeavors were to help launch the agency and determine how it could best reach the investment markets. John Dahl, the first chairman of Farmer Mac and president of the Dahl Land and Cattle Company of Gackle, N.D., told The New York Times that Edelman "helped the interim board devise strategy for last fall's very successful initial public offering of $22 million of Farmer Mac stock." Dahl added the initial public offering was bought by 1,600 financial institutions

Edelman joined Farmer Mac on June 1, 1989, as president and CEO. When he was hired, he told an interviewer the job was a "real challenge" since no staff had been hired to work with him.

In May 2008, Edelman successfully lobbied the U.S. Congress to expand Farmer Mac's charter to authorize it to purchase and guarantee securities backed by rural utilities loans. The expansion was a provision in the Food, Conservation and Energy Act of 2008.

On September 30, 2008 the Board of Directors removed him as President and CEO of Farmer Mac as part of a restructuring endeavor. Endelman joined the faculty of Cornell Law School.
