= Charles Karelis =

Academic background
- Education: Oxford University (PhD)
- Thesis: Some Concepts in Hegel's Aesthetics (1972)

Academic work
- Era: Contemporary philosophy
- Region: Western philosophy
- School or tradition: German Idealism
- Institutions: Colgate University

Charles Karelis is a philosophy researcher at the George Washington University. He was Colgate University's 14th president from 1999 to 2001.

== Life and works ==
=== Monographs ===
- Karelis, Charles (2007). The persistence of poverty : why the economics of the well-off can't help the poor. Internet Archive. New Haven : Yale University Press. ISBN 978-0-300-12090-5.

=== Translations ===
- Hegel, Georg Wilhelm Friedrich (1979). Hegel's Introduction to aesthetics : being the introduction to the Berlin aesthetics lectures of the 1820s. Internet Archive. Oxford : Clarendon Press; New York : Oxford University Press. ISBN 978-0-19-824377-9.
