= Mark Divine =

American author and podcaster

- Born: Mark D. Divine; July 14, 1963 (age 63); Utica, New York
- Education: Colgate University
- Spouse: Sandy Divine
- Military career
- Allegiance: United States
- Branch: United States Navy
- Service years: 1989–2011
- Rank: Commander
- Nickname: Cyborg
- Commands: Naval Special Warfare Group One; SEAL Team ONE; SEAL Team THREE; SEAL Delivery Vehicle

Mark Divine (born July 14, 1963) is an American author and retired Navy SEAL Commander. His military service spanned 20 years (1989–2011), overseeing various missions around the world, including Asia, the Pacific, Africa, Bahrain, and Iraq. He retired at the rank of Commander in 2011.

== Early life ==
Divine was born in Utica, New York. He attended Colgate University (graduated in 1985 with a degree in economics) while competing on the men's swim and crew teams. Upon graduation, Divine joined PricewaterhouseCoopers (then Coopers & Lybrand) as a senior consultant while working towards a Master's in Business Administration at the New York University Stern School of Business (graduated 1989) to become a Certified Public Accountant. During this time, Divine began a parallel journey into Zen meditation and Seido karate under the tutelage of Grandmaster Tadashi Nakamura, changing paths to pursue a career as a U.S. Navy SEAL Officer.

== Naval Career ==
=== Active duty (1989–1996) ===
After being commissioned into the United States Navy in November 1989 through Officer Candidate School, Divine reported to Basic Underwater Demolition/SEAL (BUD/S) training in 1990 and graduated as the Honor Man of Class 170 (#1 ranked trainee; 19 graduated out of 185 starting candidates). Following SEAL Qualification Training, Divine reported to SEAL Team THREE as an Assistant Platoon Commander and Platoon Commander. Following Team THREE, Divine served as the Operations Commander at SEAL Delivery Vehicle Team ONE (SDVT-1) stationed in Hawaii.

=== Reserves (1997–2011) ===
Divine later led various special operations missions in support of SEAL Team THREE as the executive officer at Reserve SEAL Team THREE (1996–1999). Divine was then promoted to lieutenant commander and was mobilized from the reserves to lead a Naval Special Warfare-wide initiative requested by the Department of Defense for a proof of concept deployment in conjunction with SEAL Team ONE to study the proposal to bring the U.S. Embassy into Special Operations Command as a combatant command.

Divine was then contracted by Naval Special Warfare Group One to design and lead the final capstone certification exercises (CERTEX) for deploying SEAL squadrons. Later, Divine was hired by the Naval Recruiting Command (NRC) to design and implement a nationwide mentoring program to increase the caliber of candidates entering the special operations pipeline. In his final years of service, Divine commanded Reserve SEAL Team THREE and Reserve SEAL Team ONE by serving as the Executive Officer overseeing various deployments and missions. He retired at the rank of Commander (CDR) in 2011 after 20 years of service.

== Professional career ==
After transitioning to the Navy Reserves, Divine launched SEALFIT in 2007 to serve as an immersive academy to strengthen the caliber of SOF candidates entering the Special Operations pipeline. He later founded Unbeatable, LLC in 2014 as a sister company to SEALFIT to bring leadership development to the civilian population using his five-mountain development training plan. Divine has authored several personal development and leadership books, such as Unbeatable Mind, The Way of the SEAL, and Staring Down the Wolf, throughout his professional career. In addition, Divine launched the Courage Foundation in 2017 as a 501(c)(3) organization to increase awareness about veteran suicide by raising money through the completion of 22 million burpees (one million burpees for every veteran who commits suicide per day). Divine surpassed his goal on November 11, 2020.

== Bibliography ==
- Unbeatable Mind, about how to achieve 20x your potential in life. ISBN 978-1508730514
- The Way of the SEAL, about developing Navy SEAL mental toughness and training discipline ISBN 978-1621454038
- 8 Weeks to SEALFIT, teaches how to get in shape for SEAL training. ISBN 978-1250762177
- Staring Down the Wolf: 7 Leadership Commitments that Forge Elite Teams, talks about the qualities that define successful teams. ISBN 978-1250231581
- Kokoro Yoga, guidance for yoga practice. ISBN 978-1250067210

== Awards and decorations ==
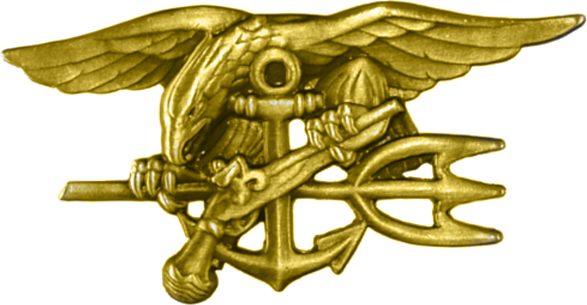
