= John J.A. Jannone =

John J.A. Jannone (born July 8, 1969) is an American artist, composer, and educator living in New York City.

== Life ==
Jannone was born in Towanda, Pennsylvania. He studied philosophy at Colgate University where he received a BA in 1991. He studied Electronic Arts at Rensselaer Polytechnic Institute where he received an MFA in 1993. He has lived in New York City since 1999.

== Teaching ==
Jannone has taught at Brooklyn College of the City University of New York since 2000. There he founded the graduate programs in Performance and Interactive Media Arts which he directed from 2003-2008, and again from Fall 2011-Spring 2013. In 2014 he was a Visiting Associate Professor in the Arts and Media Graduate Program at Osaka University.

== Business ==
Jannone is owner and director emeritus of Camp Ballibay for the Fine and Performing Arts, an arts summer camp for children in Pennsylvania, founded by his parents Gerard and Dorothy Jannone in 1964. Ballibay is the #1 rated arts camp overall, and #1 rated summer camp in Pennsylvania according to the CampRatingZ.com website. Ballibay's foodservice was featured in the New York Times.
