= Hascall Hall =

- Old Biology Hall
- U.S. National Register of Historic Places
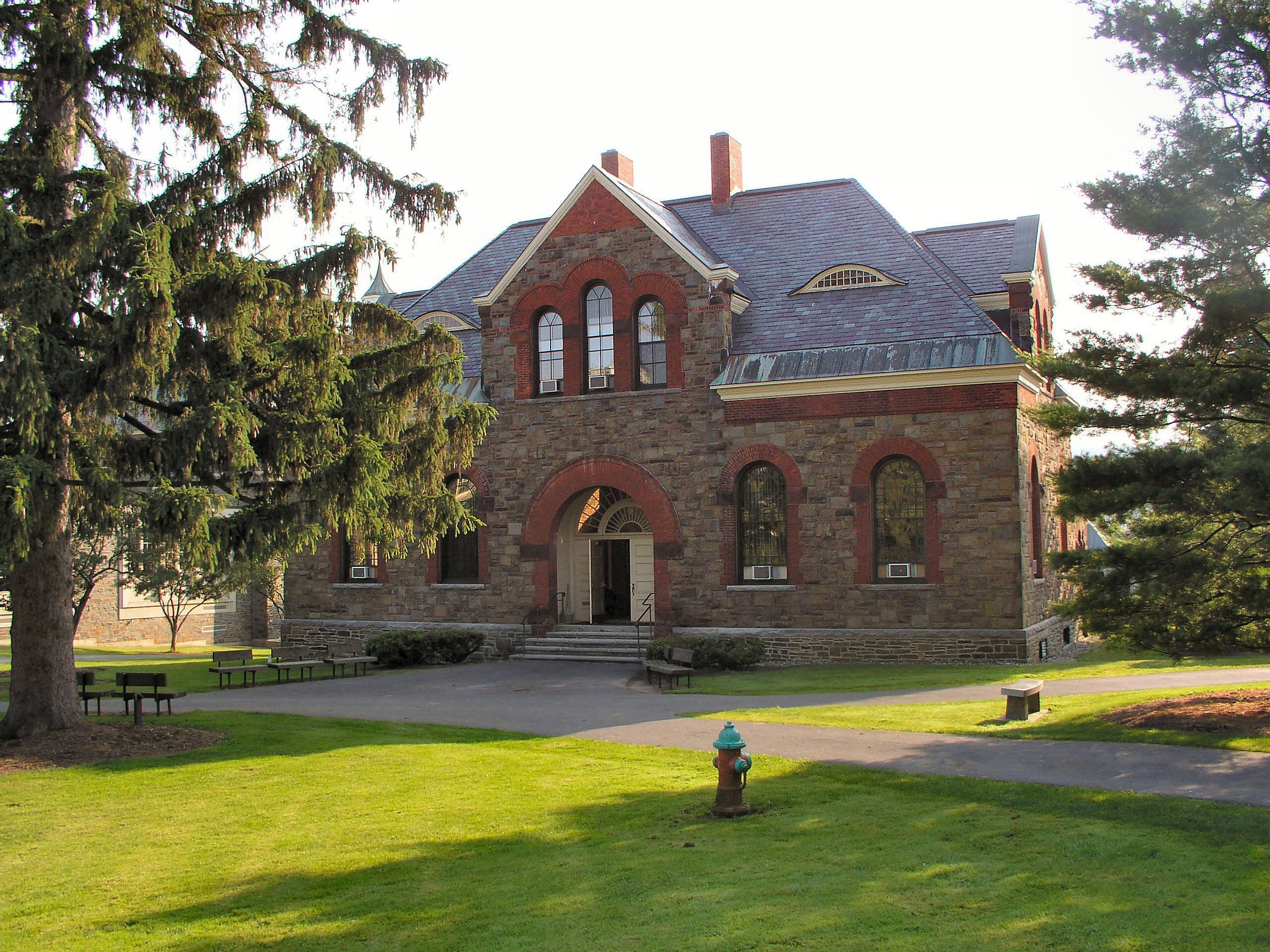
- Old Biology Building

- Location within New York Location within the United States
- Location: Colgate University, Hamilton, New York
- Coordinates: 42°49′4″N 75°32′6″W
- Area: less than one acre
- Built: 1884
- Architectural style: Richardsonian
- NRHP reference No.: 73001199
- Added to NRHP: September 20, 1973

Hascall Hall is a historic institutional building located on the campus of Colgate University at Hamilton in Madison County, New York. It was built in 1884 and is a two-story stone building with brick trim measuring 40 feet by 70 feet. An addition was completed in 1906. The original section features a hipped roof of slate, eyebrow windows, and a large semicircular archway entrance.

It was added to the National Register of Historic Places in 1973 as the Old Biology Hall. It shares its Richardsonian Romanesque architectural style with the Colgate Administration Building.

Probably the most significant science student ever to attend classes in this building, referred to commonly as "Old Bio", was Oswald Avery, class of 1900, who discovered that DNA was responsible for the transference of genetic information while later working on carefully executed experiments at the Rockefeller Institute on specimens of pneumonia found in victims of the 1918 flu outbreak. Although not well known for his work, he is credited with one of the most significant discoveries of the 20th century. Many people confuse Crick and Watson with the discovery of DNA, but in fact they discovered the helical structure and not the existence and purpose of DNA.

After Olin Hall was built at the end of the Colgate quadrangle for the biological sciences, "Old Bio" was used as an art studio in the 1970s. It was slated for demolition in 1975 but students protested around the rallying cry "Save Old Bio." T-shirts for protesters to wear during protests were printed in the "Old Bio" art studios. The protests were successful and the building was preserved. The interior was later renovated, converted back into small classrooms, and renamed Hascall Hall. The building is now home to Colgate's Philosophy department.
