= George Barton Cutten =

Canadian-born American psychologist and university administrator

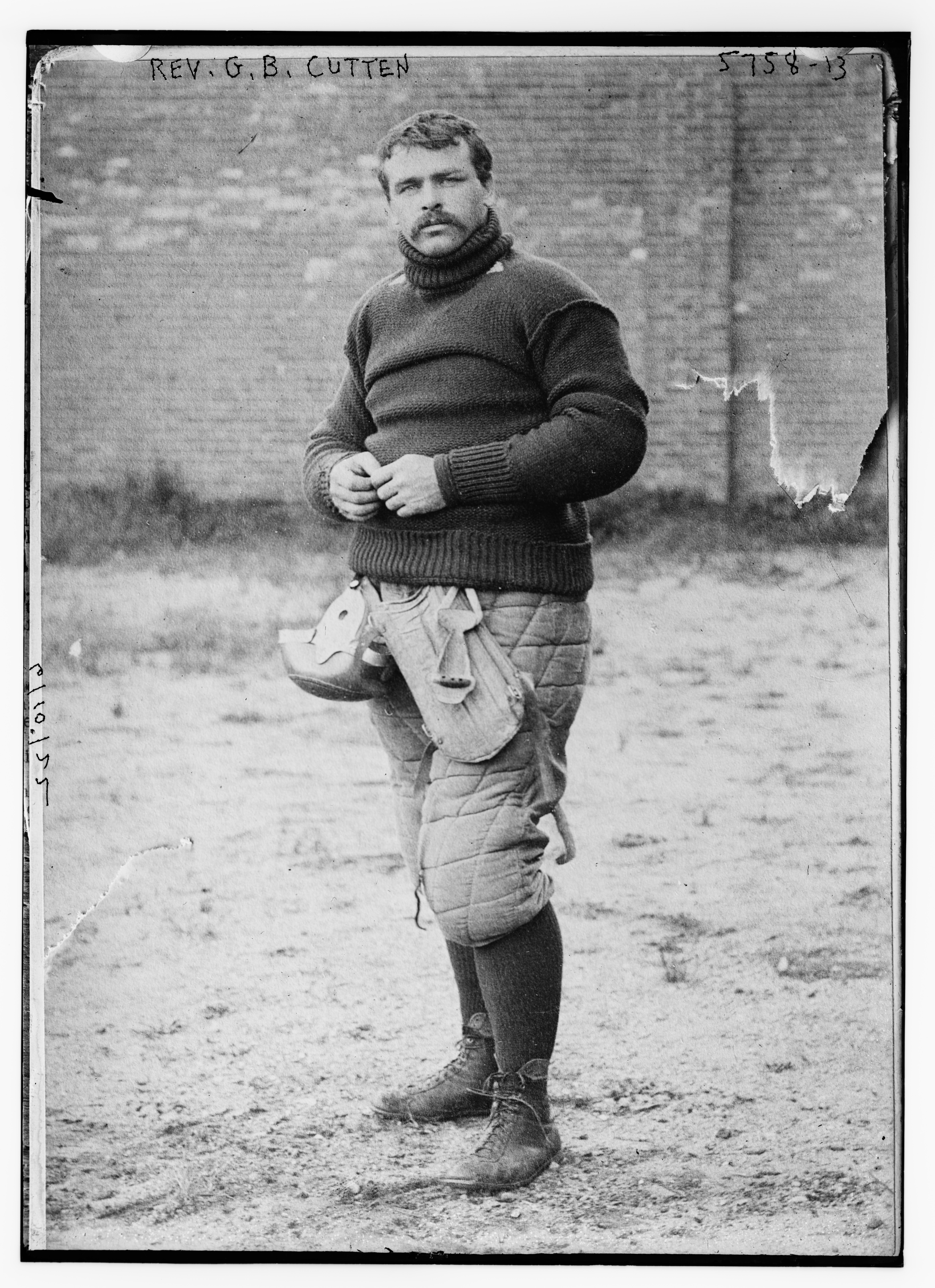

8th President of Colgate University
- In office 1922–1942
- Preceded by: Elmer Burritt Bryan
- Succeeded by: Everett Needham Case

8th President of Acadia University
- In office 1910–1922
- Preceded by: W.B. Hutchinson
- Succeeded by: Frederic Patterson

Personal details
- Born: April 11, 1874 Amherst, Nova Scotia, Canada
- Died: November 2, 1962 (aged 88) Northampton, Massachusetts
- Spouse: Minnie Warren Brown
- Children: Muriel, Claire, William F., and Sarah (d. 1926)
- Education: Acadia University (BA, 1895); Yale University (PhD, 1902)

George Barton Cutten (1874–1962) was a Canadian-born psychologist, moral philosopher, historian and university administrator. He was president of Acadia University from 1910 to 1922 and Colgate University from 1922 to 1942.

== Career ==
Born in Amherst, Nova Scotia, the son of a stipendiary magistrate, he was uncertain about what path his life should take. He had various jobs including reporter, salesman, and pipe fitter before his uncle locked him in a room, refusing to let him out until he agreed to go to university. By the fall of 1892, he had enrolled at Acadia University, Wolfville, where he joined the varsity rugby team and within three years had led the team to victory over rival Dalhousie University in 1895. He earned his BA in 1896 and a year later he was ordained a Baptist minister.

He went on to Yale University and by 1902 he had earned a degree in divinity and a PhD in psychology. There he continued playing football and, on Sundays, served as a preacher at local churches. His thesis was titled The Psychology of Alcoholism which was published, in revised form, in 1907. He was appointed professor of moral philosophy, but returned to Wolfville in 1910 to accept a position as president of the university. For more than a decade at Acadia, he actively supported the university's sporting programs and opened the Memorial Gym in 1920, a facility which continues to function today.

At the onset of the First World War, Cutten took time off to recruit for the war effort. In February 1916, he asked the board at Acadia to grant him, "a leave of absence to enable him to pursue recruitment full time" This leave would be extended to June 1917, and Cutten then took another leave to go to Halifax and help the city recover from the Halifax Explosion. Cutten actively encouraged students of Acadia to join the war effort as well. He would later become embroiled in a feud with Sir Sam Hughes over the breaking up of Nova Scotian battalions in order to reinforce other provincial battalions.

After twelve years at Acadia, in 1922 he moved to Hamilton, New York, where he had accepted the presidency of Colgate University. He altered the university admissions policy to block the admissions of African Americans and severely limited the admissions of Jewish students. Finding the university's financial affairs in disorder he set out to turn its finances around. For the next seventeen years the school declared a surplus, in the meantime doubling its faculty, plant and assets. His football teams also won championships. In 1928, he introduced the "Colgate Plan", an influential curriculum.

He retired from Colgate in 1942. After his retirement, he served as the acting president of Colgate Rochester Divinity School from 1943 to 1944 while the school was searching for a new president.

== Later work and personal life ==
In his retirement, Cutten devoted his efforts to a vocation entirely divorced from his academic pursuits. Arising from an interest in American silver which began in the 1930s, in which he amassed one of the finest private collections of his time, he published several pioneering works on the history of silver design and manufacture.

He was married to Minnie W. Brown who shared his passion for silver and contributed to his books on the subject. They had four children. He died in 1962.

== Legacy and latter reassessment ==
A women's residence named after Cutten opened at Acadia University in 1975. A residence hall complex and its associated dining hall at Colgate were named for him in 1966. Controversy erupted over the name in 2001 and resulted in a serious debate about his role as a eugenicist. At issue was his statement to the Canadian Society of New York in 1923 that "the melting pot is destructive to our race ... we must build up from our resources and conserve our race power, or else we must admit only such immigrants as shall strengthen and not weaken our race, or both. The danger the melting pot brings to the nation is the breeding out of the higher division of the white race and the breeding in of the lower divisions." He followed through with this belief by actively restricting racial diversity at the university. Though a substantial number of students organized and signed petitions calling for the renaming of the residence hall complex, the name remained at the time. However, in 2017 the hall was renamed by the Colgate Board of Trustees, after renewed advocacy by students, faculty, the University Planning Committee, and the Student Government Association.

== Publications include ==
- The Psychology of Alcoholism, Scribners, 1907.
- The Psychological Phenomena of Christianity, Scribners, 1908, (Review in The New York Times).
- Three Thousand Years of Mental Healing, New York : C. Scribner's sons, 1911.
- Mind, Its Origin and Goal, Yale University Press, 1925
- The Threat of Leisure, Ayer, 1926 (Google Books)
- Speaking with Tongues Historically and Psychologically Considered, Yale, 1927
- The Silversmiths of Utica, Hamilton, 1936
- The Silversmiths of Georgia (Together With Watchmakers and Jewellers), 1733–1850
- The Silversmiths, Watchmakers and Jewellers of The State of New York Outside of New York City, private, 1939
- Instincts and Religion, Harper and Brothers, 1940
- Silversmiths of North Carolina 1696-1860, 1948
- Silversmiths of Virginia: Together With Watchmakers and Jewellers, 1694 to 1950, 1952

Academic offices
Preceded by W. B. Hutchinson	President of Acadia University; 1910-1922	Succeeded by Frederic William Patterson
Preceded by Elmer Burritt Bryan	President of Colgate University; 1922-1942	Succeeded by Everett Needham Case
