= Robert G. Bottoms =

American academic (1944–2026)

18th President of DePauw University
- In office October 16, 1986 – June 30, 2008
- Preceded by: Richard Franklin Rosser
- Succeeded by: Brian Casey

Personal details
- Born: June 28, 1944 Birmingham, Alabama, U.S.
- Died: January 27, 2026 (aged 81)
- Spouse: Gwen Vickers Bottoms
- Education: B.A. Birmingham–Southern College 1966; B.D. Emory University 1969; D.Min. Vanderbilt University 1972

Robert G. Bottoms (June 28, 1944 – January 27, 2026) was an American higher education executive who served as the 18th President of DePauw University from 1986 to June 30, 2008. Following his presidency, he was named president emeritus and served as the founding director of the Janet Prindle Center for Ethics, serving until January 1, 2010.

During Bottoms's tenure as president, enrollment at DePauw increased, as did its standing in national rankings. The university endowment increased from $83.2 million to $521.9 million during his presidency. In 2018, the university dedicated the Robert G. Bottoms Alumni and Development Center in his honor.

== Education ==
Bottoms earned a bachelor's degree at Birmingham–Southern College, a bachelor of divinity degree at Emory University, and a PhD at Vanderbilt University.

== Personal life and death ==
Bottoms was married to Gwen Vickers Bottoms. They had two children and four grandchildren. He died on January 27, 2026, at the age of 81.
