= Brian Casey (lawyer) =

President of Colgate University since 2016

17th President of Colgate University
- Incumbent
- Assumed office July 1, 2016
- Preceded by: Jeffrey Herbst

19th President of DePauw University
- In office July 1, 2008 – June 30, 2016
- Preceded by: Robert G. Bottoms
- Succeeded by: D. Mark McCoy

Personal details
- Education: University of Notre Dame (BA); Stanford University (JD); Harvard University (PhD)

Brian W. Casey is an American lawyer who has been president of Colgate University since 2016. He was president of DePauw University from 2008 to 2016.

== Life ==
Casey graduated from the Christian Brothers Academy in Lincroft, New Jersey. He later earned his undergraduate degree in philosophy and economics from the University of Notre Dame, where he was invited to join Phi Beta Kappa and was also a member of the varsity swim team.

He earned his J.D. from Stanford University Law School in 1988, and practiced law at the Wall Street law firm Davis Polk & Wardwell before continuing on to Harvard University to obtain his PhD. He was Associate Dean for Academic Affairs at Harvard before joining DePauw in 2008.

== Third-Century Plan ==
The Third-Century Plan is a strategic framework designed to strengthen Colgate academically, financially, and reputationally. It was unveiled in 2019.

Academic offices
Preceded by Jeffrey Herbst	President of Colgate University; 2016-present	Succeeded by N/A (incumbent)
