= List of DePauw University fraternities and sororities =

Coordinates: 39°38′25.3″N 86°51′42″W

DePauw University, a small liberal arts college located in Greencastle, Indiana, bears the distinction of having an unusually high membership rate in Greek fraternities and sororities, rating consistently above 70% in recent years. For 2014, DePauw University was again ranked #1 in Greek Life by the Princeton Review. A position the school has held several times since over the past fifteen years including a stretch of seven consecutive years (2002–2008).

Following is a list of DePauw University fraternities and sororities.

== Active fraternities ==
- Alpha Tau Omega – ΑΤΩ, ATOs, founded at DePauw in 1924.
- Beta Theta Pi – ΒΘΠ, Betas, founded at DePauw in 1845.
- Delta Tau Delta – ΔΤΔ, Delts, founded at DePauw in 1882.
- Delta Upsilon – ΔΥ, DUs, founded at DePauw in 1887.
- Lambda Sigma Upsilon – ΛΣΥ, Elegua, founded at DePauw in 2012.
- Phi Delta Theta – ΦΔΘ, Phi Delts, founded at DePauw in 1868.
- Phi Gamma Delta – ΦΓΔ (Fiji), founded at DePauw in 1856. Currently the oldest active chapter of its fraternity.
- Phi Kappa Psi – ΦΚΨ, Phi Psis, founded at DePauw in 1865.
- Sigma Chi – ΣΧ, Sigs, founded at DePauw in 1859.
- Sigma Alpha Epsilon – ΣΑΕ, SAEs, founded at DePauw in 1949. Suspended by its national organization during the 2016–2017 academic year. The fraternity became active again in 2019.

== Active sororities ==
- Alpha Chi Omega – ΑΧΏ -Alpha chapter, founded at DePauw in 1885.
- Alpha Phi – ΑΦ -Gamma chapter, founded at DePauw in 1887
- Delta Gamma – ΔΓ -Gamma Iota, founded at DePauw in 1949
- Kappa Alpha Theta – ΚΑΘ -Alpha chapter, founded at DePauw in 1870, Theta is the first Greek-letter women's fraternity.
- Kappa Kappa Gamma – ΚΚΓ -Iota chapter, founded at DePauw in 1875.
- Pi Beta Phi – ΠΒΦ -Indiana Epsilon chapter, founded at DePauw in 1942.
- Psi Lambda Xi – ΨΛΞ -A local sorority founded in March, 2007.
- Alpha Kappa Alpha
- Zeta Phi Beta
- Sigma Lambda Gamma
- Omega Phi Beta
- Delta Sigma Theta

== Inactive fraternities ==
- Delta Kappa Epsilon
- Lambda Chi Alpha
- Delta Chi

Sigma Nu

== Inactive sororities ==
- Alpha Gamma Delta
- Alpha Omicron Pi
- Delta Delta Delta
- Delta Zeta

== Specialized Greek-letter organizations ==
- Alpha Phi Omega – A coeducational volunteerism/service fraternity. Active.
- Alpha Psi Omega – A coeducational honor society for students involved in the theatrical arts. Active.
- Eta Sigma Phi – A coeducational honor society for students involved in the Classics. Active.
- Chi Alpha Sigma – A coeducational honor society for athletes. Alpha chapter was founded at DePauw by former head football coach Nick Mourouzis. Active.
- Mu Phi Epsilon – A coeducational music fraternity. Active.
- Phi Mu Alpha Sinfonia – A men's music fraternity. Inactive.
- Sigma Delta Chi – Now known as the Society of Professional Journalists, the national organization was founded at DePauw in 1909. Active.
