= Neil Grabois =

American mathematician (1935–2024)

Neil R. Grabois

13th President of Colgate University
- In office 1988–1999
- Preceded by: George D. Langdon Jr.
- Succeeded by: Charles Karelis

Personal details
- Born: December 10, 1935
- Died: October 6, 2024 (aged 88)
- Spouse: Miriam Grabois
- Children: 2
- Education: Swarthmore College (BA); University of Pennsylvania (MA, PhD)

Neil R. Grabois (December 11, 1935 – October 6, 2024) was an American mathematician and university administrator. He held positions as the dean, provost, and chair of the department of mathematical sciences of Williams College; as the thirteenth President of Colgate University, from 1988 to 1999; as Vice President at the Carnegie Corporation in New York; and as the dean of the Milano School of International Affairs, Management, and Urban Policy at The New School, where he served from 2010 until his departure in 2013.

== Life and career ==
Grabois received his doctorate and master's degree from the University of Pennsylvania after attending Swarthmore College. He graduated from Stuyvesant High School in 1953.

Grabois sat on the boards of Project Pericles, Swarthmore College, The Jewish Foundation for the Education of Women and the Michael Wolk Heart Foundation. He was an adjunct faculty member of Teachers College at Columbia University.

Grabois and his wife Miriam had two children and one grandchild. He died in his sleep on October 6, 2024, at the age of 88.
