= George Edmands Merrill =

6th President of Colgate University
- In office 1899–1908
- Preceded by: George William Smith
- Succeeded by: Elmer Burritt Bryan

Personal details
- Born: December 19, 1846 Charlestown, Boston, Massachusetts, United States
- Died: January 1, 1908 (aged 61) Hamilton, New York
- Education: Harvard University (AB, 1869); Newton Theological Institution (AM, 1872)

George Edmands Merrill (December 19, 1846 – June 11, 1908) was an American Baptist clergyman and educator, born at Charlestown, Mass.

== Early life ==
Merrill was born on December 19, 1846, in Charlestown, Boston. He was a son of Nathan Merrill and Amelia G. (née Edmands) Merrill.

He attended Harvard University, graduating in 1869, followed by Newton Theological Institution, where he graduated in 1872. Merrill received the honorary degrees of D.D. from Colby College in 1895 and that of LL.D. from the University of Rochester in 1901.

== Career ==
The house of Colgate University's president, George Edmands Merrill, in 1911

After ordination, he became pastor of Baptist churches in Massachusetts at Springfield (1872–77), Salem (1877–85), and Newton (1890–99). Two years (1885–87) he spent at Colorado Springs, Colorado. From 1899 until his death he was president of Colgate University. His writings include: The Story of the Manuscripts (third edition, 1881); Crusaders and Captives (1890); The Reasonable Christ (1893); The Parchments of the Faith (1895); "The Songs of Solomon," in the American Commentary on the Old Testament (1905).

== Personal life ==
On October 1, 1872, Merrill was married to Florence A. Whittemore, a daughter of George W. and Synia H. Whittemore. Before her death on December 18, 1875, they were the parents of one daughter, Elinor Merrill.

After the death of his first wife, he married Carrie A. Beebe on April 5, 1877. With Carrie, a daughter of Jared and Mary Beebe, he had a daughter, who died during birth on March 7, 1878, a few months before Carrie's death on September 28, 1878.

On September 19, 1882, he married for the third time to Emma M. Bateman, a daughter of Evan John and Ruth Ann (née Botsford) Bateman.

Merrill died on June 11, 1908, at Hamilton, New York.
