= Colgate University =

Private university in Hamilton, New York, US

- Former names: Baptist Education Society of the State of New York (1819–1823); Hamilton Literary & Theological Institution (1823–1846); Madison University (1846–1890)
- Motto: Deo ac Veritati (Latin)
- Motto in English: For God and Truth
- Type: Private liberal arts college
- Established: 1819; 207 years ago
- Academic affiliations: Space-grant
- Endowment: $1.345 billion (2025)
- President: Brian W. Casey
- Provost: Lesleigh Cushing
- Faculty: 355 (2018)
- Undergraduates: 3,219 (2022)
- Postgraduates: 11 (2018)
- Location: Hamilton Village, New York, United States; 42°49′10″N 75°32′11″W
- Campus: Rural, 575 acres (233 ha)
- Colors: Maroon & white
- Nickname: Raiders
- Sporting affiliations: NCAA Division I FCS – Patriot League, ECAC Hockey; MAISA
- Mascot: Raider
- Website: colgate.edu

Colgate University is a private liberal arts college in Hamilton, New York, United States. It was founded in 1819 as the Baptist Education Society of the State of New York and operated under that name until 1823, when it was renamed Hamilton Theological and Literary Institution, often called Hamilton College (1823–1846), then Madison College (1846–1890), and its present name since 1890.

Colgate enrolls approximately 3,200 students in 56 undergraduate majors that culminate in a Bachelor of Arts degree. The student body is 54% female and 46% male. Students participate in over 200 clubs and organizations. While Colgate offers an almost entirely undergraduate program, it also has a small graduate program leading to the Master of Arts in Teaching. The college competes in NCAA Division I sports and is part of the Patriot League athletic conference and ECAC Hockey.

== History ==
In 1817, the Baptist Education Society of the State of New York was founded by thirteen men (six clergymen and seven laymen). Two years later, in 1819, the state granted the school a charter, and it opened a year later, in 1820. The first classes were held in a building in the town of Hamilton. Three years later, in 1823, the Baptist Theological Seminary at New York City incorporated with the Baptist Education Society and subsequently changed its name to the Hamilton Literary & Theological Institution. Among the trustees was William Colgate, founder of the Colgate Company.

In 1826, the school's trustees bought farmland that later became the focal point of the campus, known as "The Hill". One year later, the current students and faculty of the school built West Hall, using stone cut from a quarry on the property. Originally called West Edifice before being renamed to West Hall, it is the oldest structure on campus. On March 26, 1846, the State of New York granted a college charter to Hamilton's Collegiate Department; in the two years prior to that, at the request of Hamilton trustees, degrees of forty-five Bachelor's students and at least one Master's candidate were awarded by Columbian College in Washington, D.C. (now the George Washington University), a fellow Baptist institution. In 1846, the school changed its name to Madison University. In 1850, the Baptist Education Society planned to move the university to Rochester, but was halted by legal action. Dissenting trustees, faculty, and students founded the University of Rochester. Another group of Baptist dissenters, calling for an end to racial and gender discrimination, had founded New-York Central College in 1849.

In 1853, the first African American known to graduate from Madison University (AB degree) was Henry Livingston Simpson. He continued his studies and earned a theological degree in 1855.

In 1890, Madison University changed its name to Colgate University in recognition of the family and its gifts to the school. James B. Colgate, one of William Colgate's sons, established a $1 million endowment called the Dodge Memorial Fund. In 1912 Colgate Academy, a preparatory and high school that had operated in Hamilton since the early 1800s, was closed and its facility became Colgate University's administration building.

During World War II, Colgate University was one of 131 colleges and universities nationally that took part in the V-12 Navy College Training Program which offered students a path to a Navy commission.

Beginning with undergraduate students admitted in 2022, Colgate became fully tuition-free for students from families making $80,000 or less, charged between 5 and 10% of income for families making between $80,000 and $150,000, and met 100% of demonstrated need for students from families making more than $150,000.

=== Coeducation ===
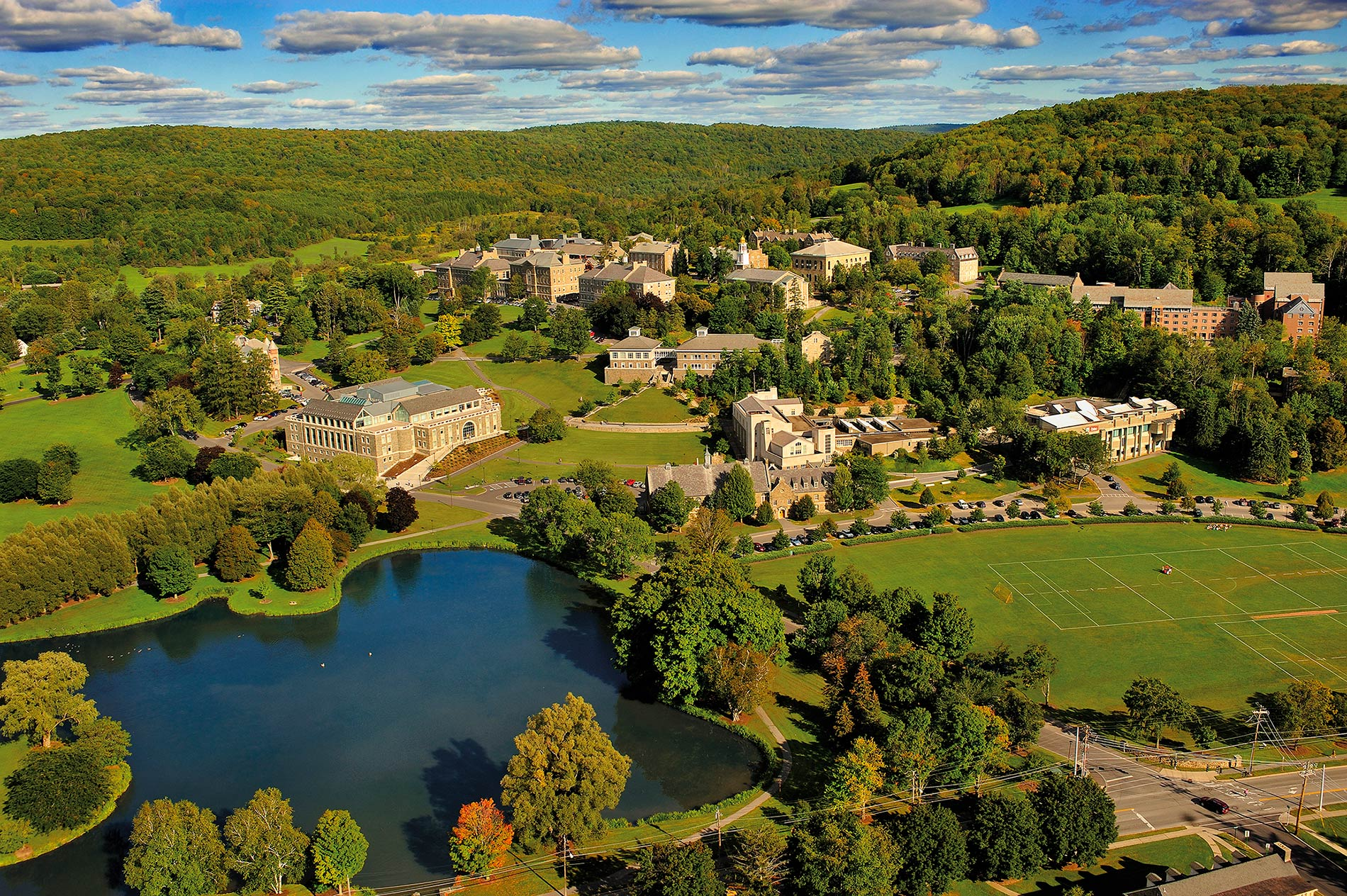
The Colgate University campus in Hamilton, New York

At its inception, the institution was an all-male institution but started to see female students attend in a limited capacity as early as the mid-1800s when Emily Taylor, daughter of then-president Stephen W. Taylor (1851–56), attended her father's moral philosophy class.

The institution's first full-time female student was Mabel Dart (later Colegrove), who participated in classes from 1878 to 1882. At the time, university officials deemed it best that female students not be embarrassed by graduating from an all-male college, and made arrangements for Dart officially to receive her degree from the then all-female Vassar College.

In the ensuing years, additional female students participated in courses, including faculty spouses and the wives of enrolled veterans in the post-WWII era. Colgate became fully coeducational in 1970.

=== University presidents ===
The house of Colgate University's president, George Edmands Merrill, in 1911

List of presidents
Number	President	Years served
1	Nathaniel Kendrick	1836–1848
2	Stephen William Taylor	1851–1856
3	George Washington Eaton	1856–1868
4	Ebenezer Dodge	1868–1890
5	George William Smith	1895–1897
6	George Edmands Merrill	1899–1908
7	Elmer Burritt Bryan	1909–1921
8	George Barton Cutten	1922–1942
9	Everett Needham Case	1942–1962
10	Vincent MacDowell Barnett Jr.	1963–1969
11	Thomas Alva Bartlett	1969–1977
12	George D. Langdon Jr.	1978–1988
13	Neil R. Grabois	1988–1999
14	Charles Karelis	1999–2001
15	Rebecca Chopp	2002–2009
16	Jeffrey Herbst	2010–2015
17	Brian Casey	2016–present

==== Cutten's controversial legacy ====
The national monument at Ellis Island displays a statement by Colgate's eighth president, George Barton Cutten, which has been criticized for its jingoistic anti-immigration sentiment. He warned, "The danger [that] the 'melting pot' brings to the nation is the breeding out of the higher divisions of the white race."

While Cutten's legacy has been marred by the espousal of racist beliefs, the contributions he made to developing the prestige and facilities of Colgate were significant. Student protests in 2006 around campus facilities bearing Cutten's name became emblematic of the division surrounding how modern American universities should reconcile their own history with racism. Colgate removed the Cutten name from a residential complex located between Whitnall Field and Huntington Gym in 2017. Each of the four houses that compose the building—Brigham, Shepardson, Read, and Whitnall—is now known by its existing name and street address, 113 Broad Street.

== Campus ==
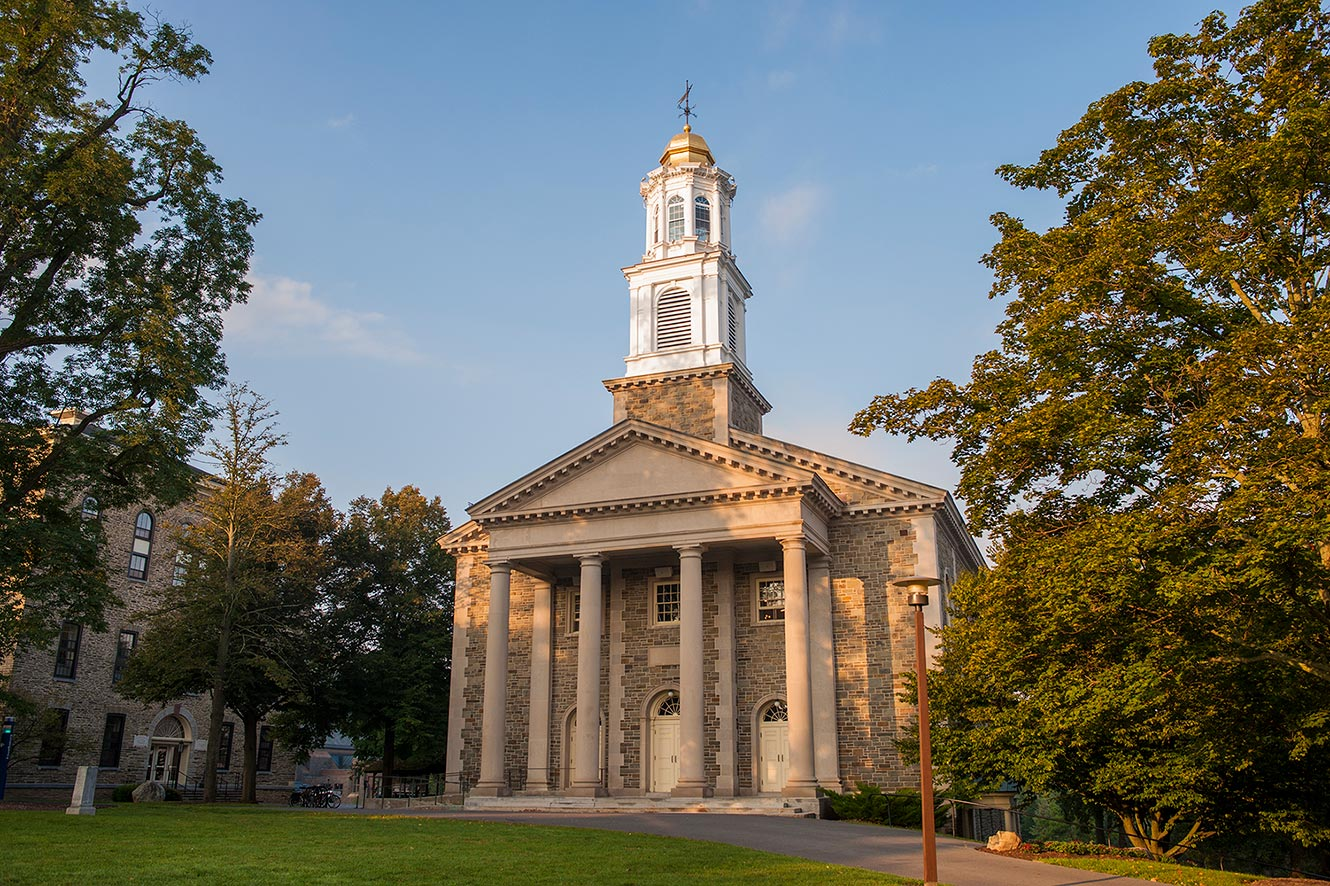
Memorial Chapel is the anchor of the Colgate University Academic Quad.

All of Colgate University is in Hamilton Town. Additionally, almost all of the land is also in Hamilton Village. The campus is situated on 575 acres (2.33 km^{2}) of land. The university owns an additional 1,100 acres (4.5 km^{2}) of undeveloped forested lands.

Colgate's first building, West Hall, was built by students and faculty from stones from Colgate's own rock quarry. Nearly all the buildings on campus are built of stone, and newer buildings are built with materials that fit the style. Old Biology Hall (now renamed to Hascall Hall) was built in 1884 and added to the National Register of Historic Places in 1973. The principal campus plan was created by Ernest W. Bowditch in 1891–1893, drawing on earlier recommendations by Frederick Law Olmsted.

Probably the most distinctive building on campus is Colgate Memorial Chapel, which was built in 1918 and is used for lectures, performances, concerts, and religious services.

Most of the campus's heat is generated from a wood boiler which burns wood chips, a renewable resource. Supplemental natural gas boilers are used to reduce operational costs and provide additional steam generating capacity. Almost all of Colgate's electricity comes from a hydroelectric dam at Niagara Falls; the rest comes from nuclear sources. The campus also has a Green Bikes program with over two dozen bikes that are loaned out in an effort to encourage students to rely less on cars. Colgate Dining Services currently provides organic rice, beans, and other dry foods, and is working to offer more local foods options. Dining Services take-out containers are also made from natural materials, and are compostable. On August 13, 2015, Colgate received a perfect sustainability score from the Princeton Review. As a result, it was recognized as one of only 24 schools (out of 861 evaluated) to make their Green Honor Roll.

=== Outreach ===
Colgate founded the Upstate Institute in 2003. The institute was created to connect the Colgate community to its surrounding region, as well as to give back and help economically and socially sustain the area. Currently, they do research on counties in the area, as well as support outreach and volunteer organizations.

Colgate was an initial sponsor of Partnership for Community Development, a local nonprofit organization which seeks to support the community through the revitalization of buildings and small business development.

Colgate administers Chapel House, a non-denominational retreat and meditation garden. Opened in 1959, the building was designed by Skidmore, Owings, and Merrill and is an example of late international-style modernism.

=== Longyear Museum of Anthropology ===
The Longyear Museum of Anthropology is part of the Department of Sociology and Anthropology at Colgate University. The Longyear Museum exhibition gallery is centrally located in Alumni Hall on campus.

=== Picker Art Gallery ===
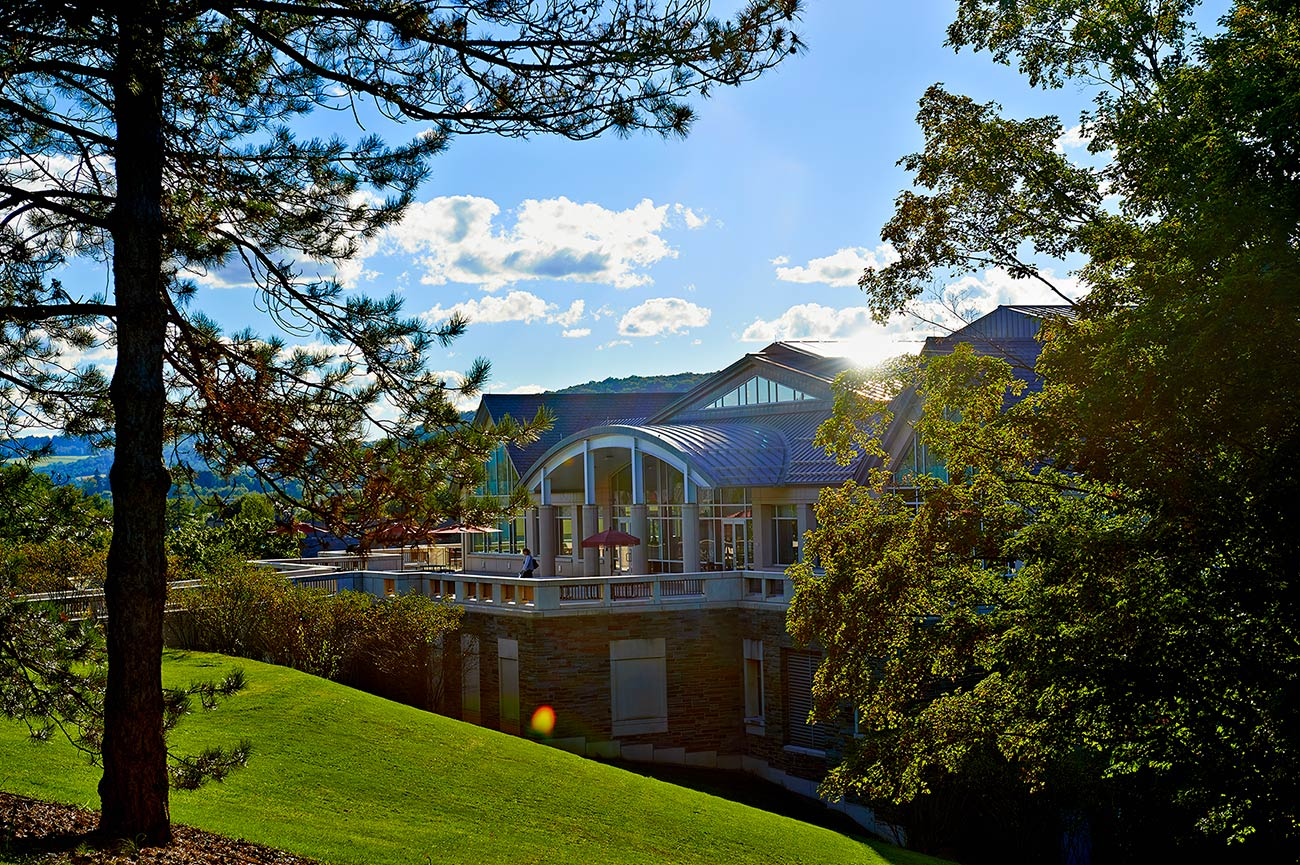
Case Library and Geyer Center for Information Technology

The Picker Art Gallery is a fine arts museum that is housed in the Dana Arts Center at Colgate University in Hamilton, New York. It was named after Evelyn Picker, class of '36 and trustee emeritus, and opened in 1969. The Museum houses 11,000-some art objects in its permanent collections. Highlights include old master paintings from Europe, woodblock prints from China and Japan, and a series of original photographs from famed Soviet wartime photographer Yevgeny Khaldei.

Since 2013, there have been plans to move the Picker collection to a new facility, which Colgate University has named the Center for Art and Culture.

==== Exhibitions ====
In 2013, the Picker Art Museum launched an online campaign to display works as a digital exhibition, their first being "Selected Old Masters From the Picker Art Gallery". Other than this online gallery, all exhibition, and educational programs have been temporarily ceased due to the university's thorough assessment of the works in anticipation for the move to the new Center for Arts and Culture.

=== Academic journal ===
Colgate University edits and publishes an international academic journal entitled Medieval & Renaissance Drama in England. It was founded in 1984 and publishes academic content related to the study of drama prior to 1642. It is part of the English Department. This journal is also indexed and available on JSTOR.

== Academics ==
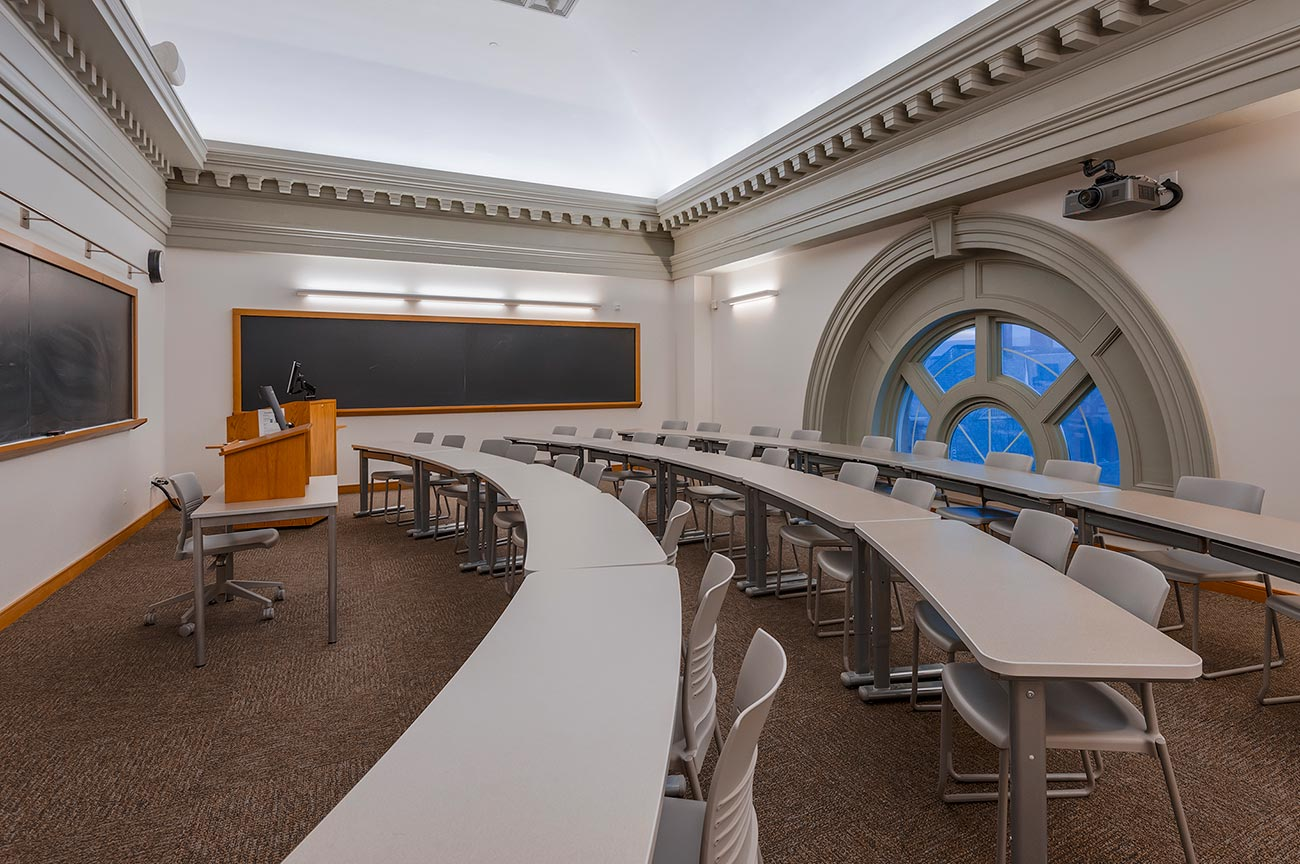
A classroom in Colgate University's Lathrop Hall

Colgate offers 57 undergraduate majors leading to a Bachelor of Arts degree, all of which are registered officially with the New York State Department of Education. The university also has a small Master of Arts in Teaching degree program, which graduates 3–7 students each year. Its most popular undergraduate majors, by 2021 graduates, were:

Econometrics and Quantitative Economics (76)
Political Science and Government (65)
English Language and Literature (44)
Research and Experimental Psychology (43)
Biology/Biological Sciences (41)
Computer Science (35)

In addition to regular campus courses, the university offers 22 semester-long off-campus study groups each year, including programs in Australia, China, Japan, India, several Western European countries, Washington, D.C., and the National Institutes of Health.

Colgate University is among the 100 most selective colleges and universities in the United States, and is considered a Hidden Ivy as well as one of the Little Ivies.

=== Admissions ===
For the class of 2030 (entering fall 2026), 16,774 students applied, 3,416 (20%) were admitted, and 824 matriculated. Enrolled students had an average high school GPA of 3.81 out of 4.0, with 78% of students in the top 10% of their class and 89% in top 20%. The middle 50% SAT range was 1460 to 1530, while the ACT composite range was 33 to 35. The university met 100% of the demonstrated need with financial aid, with 44% of students receiving financial aid. For the admitted domestic students with a total family income of under $175,000, Colgate offers financial aid packages that involve no loan.

=== Reputation and rankings ===
Academic rankings

Liberal arts
- U.S. News & World Report: 22 (tie) of 186
- Washington Monthly: 22 of 194

National
- Forbes: 45 of 500
- WSJ/College Pulse: 52 (tie) of 600

In 2024, U.S. News & World Report ranked Colgate as the 22nd out of 211 best liberal arts colleges in the country, tied with University of Richmond. In 2024, Washington Monthly ranked Colgate 22nd among 194 liberal arts colleges in the U.S. based on its contribution to the public good, as measured by social mobility, research, and promoting public service.

== Administration ==
On July 1, 2016, Brian Casey began serving as Colgate's 17th president.

=== Board of trustees ===
Colgate is governed by a board of trustees composed of 35 members: 31 alumni, three parents of students, and the current president. As of June 30, 2025, Colgate's endowment was $1.341 billion.

== Student life ==
=== Housing and student life facilities ===
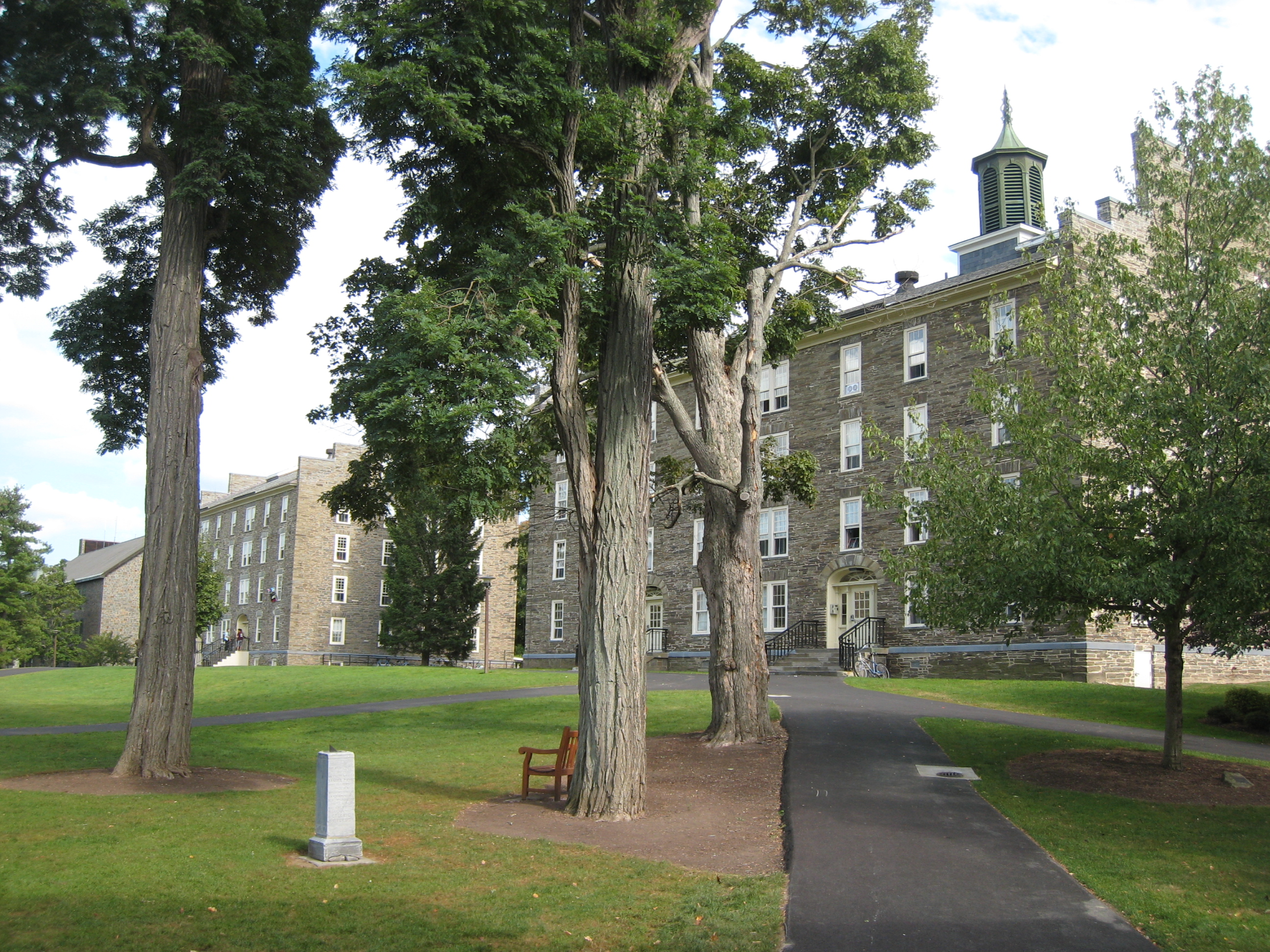
East and West Halls, the oldest residential halls of the university

Colgate has ten residence halls located on its central campus, which is often referred to as "up the hill." Located near the academic buildings, freshmen live in six of these halls, whereas sophomores live in the other three, or in townhouses or one house on Broad Street. Juniors and seniors live down the hill in a number of residences, such as theme houses on Broad Street, apartment complexes or in "townhouses" located further away from campus.

The O'Connor Campus Center, commonly referred to as the Coop, serves as the center for student life and programming. Renovations on it were completed in 2004, and it now houses the offices for student organizations, a cafeteria, post office, printing center, a computer facility, as well as the new Blackmore Media Center, home to WRCU, Colgate's radio station.

=== Fraternities and sororities ===
Following a number of incidents related to Greek Life on campus, the university began purchasing sorority and fraternity houses in 2005. The only fraternity or sorority not purchased, Delta Kappa Epsilon, was subsequently derecognized.

=== Student groups ===
Colgate has close to 200 student groups and organizations.

=== Media ===
WRCU is Colgate University's student-operated radio station, broadcasting throughout central New York on 90.1 FM, and the station was re-modeled in 2010. Colgate's student-run TV station, CUTV, broadcasts on the university's local cable system and provides a mix of student-created content and first-run movies 24 hours a day. The Colgate Maroon-News is the oldest college weekly in America. The first student newspaper was the Hamilton Student, launched on November 2, 1846.

== Traditions ==
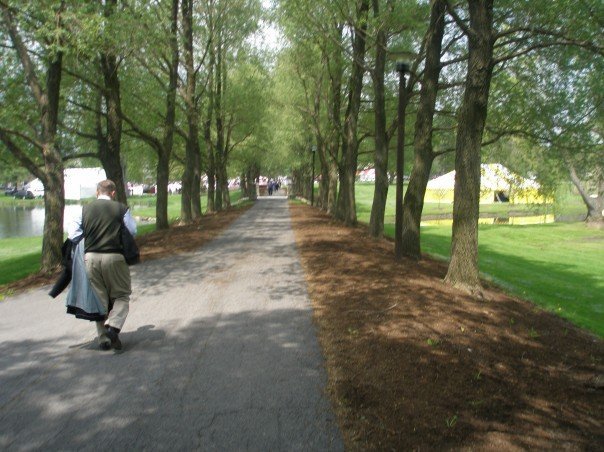
The "Willow Path"

The number 13 is considered to be lucky at Colgate. It is said that Colgate was founded by thirteen men with thirteen dollars, thirteen prayers and thirteen articles. This tradition is expressed in many ways. Colgate's address is 13 Oak Drive, and its zip code is 13346, which begins with 13 and ends with three digits that sum to 13. The Tredecim Senior Honor Society (formerly Konosioni) is composed of 13 men and 13 women. Alumni wear Colgate apparel on every Friday the 13th, which is designated as Colgate Day. In addition to this, Colgate University also enforces a 13 mile per hour speed limit on its upper campus area.

In 1936, the Colgate swim team made its first trip to Fort Lauderdale, Florida, for spring break training at the Casino Pool. This became a regular tradition for Colgate that caught on with other schools across the country and proved to be the genesis of the college spring break trip.

== Athletics ==
Official athletics logo

Approximately 25% of students are involved in a varsity sport, and 80% of students are involved in some form of varsity, club, or intramural athletics. There are 25 varsity teams, over 30 club sports teams, and 18 different intramural sports. Colgate is part of NCAA Division I for all varsity sports.

The football program competes within the Division I Football Championship Subdivision (FCS). The athletic teams are nicknamed the "Raiders", and the traditional team colors are maroon and white, with a more recent addition of gray in the 1970s. Maroon replaced orange as the school's primary color on March 24, 1900. Colgate is a member of the Patriot League for all varsity sports except for hockey, in which both its men's and women's teams are members of ECAC Hockey.

Starting in 1932, Colgate athletics teams were called the "Red Raiders" in reference to the new maroon uniforms of that season's "undefeated, untied, unscored upon, and uninvited" football team, which was the first to use the moniker. Apocryphal explanations for the name include the team's ability to defeat its much larger rival, the Cornell University Big Red, or that a rainstorm caused one Colgate football team's maroon jerseys to blend into a reddish color. Regardless, after the adoption of a Native American mascot, the school debated changing the name and mascot in the 1970s out of sensitivity to Native Americans. At that time the nickname was retained, but the mascot was changed to a hand holding a torch. In 2001, the administration acknowledged concerns that the adjective "Red" still had a Native American implication, and the school shortened the nickname to the "Raiders" starting in the 2001–02 school year. A new mascot was introduced in 2006.

=== Outdoor education ===
Colgate makes use of its rural location by having a full outdoor education program. A base camp is located on campus and allows students to rent equipment for skiing, camping, and other outdoor events. Each year, twelve to fifteen students are selected to become staffers for Outdoor Education. The training takes more than six months and includes a Wilderness First Responder certification. Incoming first-year students are offered a week-long trip spent backpacking, canoeing, kayaking, caving or rock climbing in the Adirondacks.

== Alumni ==
Colgate has more than 34,000 living alumni. As of 2016, Colgate alumni have a median starting salary of $53,700 and have a median mid-career salary of $119,000. In 2016, Forbes ranked Colgate 16th in colleges that produce the highest-earning graduates. As of 2009, among small schools, Colgate was the tenth-largest producer of alumni who go onto the Peace Corps.

Some of the most notable alumni from the list of Colgate University people are:

Name	Class year	Notability
Charles Evans Hughes	(attended 1876–1878)	11th chief justice of the United States, 36th governor of New York, presidential candidate, 44th U.S. secretary of state
Adam Clayton Powell Jr.	1930	New York congressman and civil rights leader
Johnny Marks	1931	Songwriter of Christmas classics including "Rudolph, the Red-Nosed Reindeer" and "Rockin' Around the Christmas Tree"
Andy Rooney	1942	CBS-TV: 60 Minutes commentator, columnist
Ben Cohen	Did not graduate	Co-founder of Ben & Jerry's
Gloria Borger	1974	CNN journalist and columnist
Jeff Fager	1977	Former chairman of CBS News
Mark Murphy	1977	Former NFL player with Washington Redskins, former CEO of Green Bay Packers; two-time Super Bowl champion, once as a player and once as an executive; former athletics director for Colgate and Northwestern
Chris Hedges	1979	Pulitzer Prize-winning journalist
Bob Woodruff	1983	ABC News foreign correspondent
Carmine Di Sibio	1985	Global chairman and CEO, EY
Steve Burke	1980	President and CEO, NBCUniversal; former COO, Comcast
Kevin Heffernan		Actor and member of Broken Lizard Comedy Troupe
Monica Crowley	1990	Spokesperson and assistant secretary of state for Public Affairs for the U.S. Department of the Treasury; Fox News contributor
Adonal Foyle	1998	Former NBA player with Golden State Warriors, Orlando Magic, and Memphis Grizzlies
