= Kenwood Historic District =

Kenwood Historic District may refer to the following places in the United States:

- Kenwood Historic District (St. Petersburg, Florida), listed on the NRHP in Florida
- Hyde Park–Kenwood Historic District, listed on the NRHP in South Side of Chicago, Illinois
- Kenwood District, the southern Kenwood neighborhood designated as a Chicago Landmark District, in Illinois
  - North Kenwood District
- Kenwood Historic District (Enid, Oklahoma), NRHP-listed
- Kenwood Park–Prospect Hill Historic District, Milwaukee, Wisconsin, listed on the NRHP in Milwaukee, Wisconsin
