= Sue Duncan Children's Center =

Non-profit organization on the South Side of Chicago

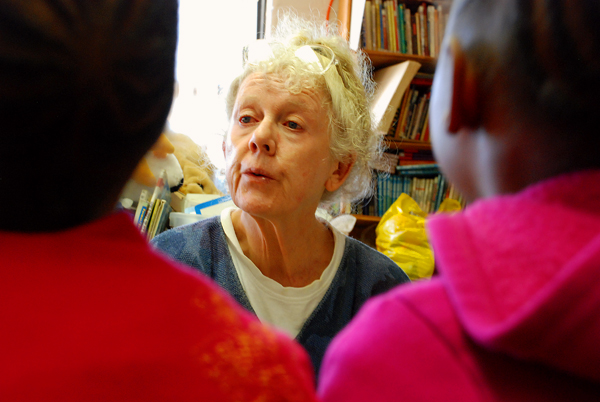
Sue Duncan has taught children at her center since 1961.

The Sue Duncan Children's Center is a non-profit organization on the South Side of Chicago founded in 1961 by Susan Duncan, mother of former Secretary of Education (under President Barack Obama) Arne Duncan. The center runs afterschool and summer programs to provide children of all ages free tutoring and academic support as well as access to extracurricular activities such as basketball and art. The center currently serves approximately 80 students.

== History ==
Duncan started the center in 1961 after a friend at the Kenwood United Church of Christ asked her to teach Bible school to nine girls, ages 8 to 10, at the church and she discovered none of them could read. Over the years, the tutoring program has moved around to several different neighborhood churches and is now situated inside Jackie Robinson Elementary School in North Kenwood District.

Duncan faced troubles early on because of her novel position as a Caucasian starting an afterschool program in an almost completely African American community. During Arne Duncan's confirmation hearing to become Secretary of Education, he said:

"One of my earliest memories was in -- in -- I was about 6 years old, in 1970, the church that we were working out of was firebombed by the Blackstone Rangers. And I remember salvaging what we could from the church and walking down the block to another church and carrying crates of books and asking that -- that minister to allow us to come in and work, and having to deal with that.

Our lives were threatened. My mother's life was threatened. I remember leaving work one night and a guy coming by and saying if we came back the next day we'd be killed. And so we had an interesting conversation that -- that night at home at dinner. Our dinnertime conversations may be a little bit different than other families. And we tried to figure out what to do and really decided that you can't -- you can't run. And once you start running, you know, you'll be chancing your shadow eventually. So we showed up the next day and luckily he didn't."

Duncan's three children, Arne, Sarah and Owen, spent much of their childhoods at the center. Other alumni of the center include Oscar nominee Michael Clarke Duncan and top IBM engineer Kerrie Holley.

== Program overview ==
The children's center provides academic help to primarily low-income African American children living on the South Side of Chicago. According to the center's website:

"SDCC further recognizes that the needs of its children are deeper than educational, that many have experienced and witnessed violence in their neighborhoods and homes leading to deep anger and subsequent behavioral problems.

The Center, through a range of programmatic components, aims to support the whole child, fostering academic achievement and emotional and social well being. To this end, the first part of the day is focused on academics with the children participating in small reading groups, intensive one-on-one tutoring, small group tutoring, and group discussions.

After all the children receive a warm nutritious meal, they participate in various activities focused more on social and emotional growth. SDCC provides violin lessons, a teenage girl's discussion group, weekly meditation aimed at teaching anger management techniques and Spanish class. SDCC also provides individual and group art therapy with a licensed Art Therapist weekly. The day ends with recreational activities in the gym."
