= Kenwood =

Kenwood may refer to:

== Businesses ==
- Kenwood Corporation, Japanese consumer electronics brand owned by JVCKenwood
- Kenwood Limited, British kitchen appliances manufacturer owned by De'Longhi

== Places ==
=== United Kingdom ===
- Kenwood, Hampstead Heath, or Ken Wood, London, England
  - Kenwood House
- Kenwood, St George's Hill, John Lennon's home in Weybridge, Surrey, England

=== United States ===
==== Settlements ====
- Kenwood, California
- Kenwood, Chicago, Illinois
  - 47th Street/Kenwood station
  - Kenwood District
  - North Kenwood District
- Kenwood (Duluth), Minnesota
- Kenwood, Minneapolis, Minnesota
- Kenwood, Missouri
- Kenwood, New York
- Kenwood, Albany, New York
- Kenwood, Ohio
- Kenwood, Oklahoma
- Kenwood, Roanoke, Virginia
- Kenwood Historic District (disambiguation), several places

==== Buildings ====
- Kenwood (Gloucester, Virginia), a historic house and property
- Kenwood (Huntington, West Virginia), a historic house
- Kenwood Towne Centre, a shopping mall in Cincinnati, Ohio

== Schools ==
- Kenwood Academy, opened as Kenwood High School, Chicago, Cook County, Illinois
- Kenwood High School (Maryland), in Essex, Baltimore County, Maryland, US
- Kenwood High School (Tennessee), in Clarksville, Montgomery County, Tennessee, US

== Fiction ==
- Mary Kenwood, fictional burglar in the manga series Death Note

== See also ==
- Ken Wood (disambiguation)
