= Kenwood station =

Kenwood station may refer to:

- Kenwood station (California), a former train station in Kenwood, California
- 47th Street/Kenwood station, a train station in Chicago, Illinois

== See also ==
- Kenwood (disambiguation)
