= Kentwood =

Kentwood may refer to:

United Kingdom

- Kentwood (Reading ward), part of Tilehurst

United States

- Kentwood, Louisiana
- Kentwood, Michigan
- Kentwood High School (Washington), in Covington

== See also ==
- Kenwood (disambiguation)
