= Ken Wood =

Ken or Kenneth Wood may refer to:

== People ==
- Ken Wood (athlete) (1933–2008), British middle-distance runner
- Ken Wood (baseball) (1924–2007), baseball player
- Ken Wood (coach) (1929–2018), Australian swimming coach
- Ken Wood (manufacturer) (1916–1997), founder of Kenwood Manufacturing Co.
- Ken Wood (rugby league) (1906–1942), Australian rugby league
- Kenneth Berridge Wood (1885–1968), English rugby union player
- Kenneth H. Wood (1917–2008), Seventh-day Adventist minister and author
- Giovanni Cianfriglia (1935–2024), Italian actor and stuntman, often billed as Ken Wood

== Places ==
- Ken Wood, a section of Hampstead Heath Woods in London

== See also ==
- Kenneth Woods (disambiguation)
- Kenwood (disambiguation)
