= The Slammin' Salmon =

- Theatrical release poster
- Directed by: Kevin Heffernan
- Written by: Broken Lizard
- Produced by: Peter Lengyel; Richard Perello
- Starring: Michael Clarke Duncan; Jay Chandrasekhar; Kevin Heffernan; Steve Lemme; Paul Soter; Erik Stolhanske; Cobie Smulders; April Bowlby; Olivia Munn
- Cinematography: Robert Barocci
- Edited by: Brad Katz
- Music by: Nathan Barr
- Production companies: Cataland Films; Broken Lizard
- Distributed by: Anchor Bay Films
- Release dates: January 17, 2009 (Slamdance Film Festival); December 11, 2009 (United States)
- Running time: 99 minutes
- Country: United States
- Language: English

The Slammin' Salmon is a 2009 American comedy film by the comedy troupe Broken Lizard. It is about the owner of a restaurant who holds a contest to see which one of his waiters can earn the most money in a single night. The winner receives $10,000, and the loser receives a "beat down" by the owner, Cleon Salmon, a former heavyweight boxer (played by Michael Clarke Duncan). Kevin Heffernan directed the film, his first time for a Broken Lizard film.

== Plot summary ==
In Miami, Florida, retired heavyweight boxing champion Cleon Salmon owns the restaurant The Slammin' Salmon. His staff consists of manager Rich, eccentric waiter Nuts, callous Guy, pre-med Tara, ballet student Mia, aspiring actor Connor, angry chef Dave and his busboy twin brother Donnie. Cleon informs Rich that the restaurant needs to make $20,000 by the end of the night so that he can pay off a wager he made with the yakuza. If they can't make enough money, the yakuza will take the restaurant.

Rich initially offers the top-selling waiter two tickets to an upcoming Norah Jones concert. After a slow start, Rich realizes he needs to offer a better prize. He perfectly impersonates Cleon's voice and books a vacation at a resort hotel in Key Largo. Now motivated, the staff steps up their sales efforts. Connor is approached by movie star Marlon Specter, who asks him to hide an engagement ring for his girlfriend in her dessert. Rich eats the dessert and swallows the engagement ring after Connor is distracted by Mia. Connor tells Marlon what happened, and Marlon threatens to beat both Rich and Connor if they don't get it back. Meanwhile, Nuts begins acting strange while serving, and Mia suffers a first-degree burn after Guy trips over Donnie and spills a piping hot soup in her face. Tara looks at Mia's burn and tells her she should go home, but Mia refuses, and Rich encourages her to keep selling.

Cleon tracks down Rich and asks for the total so far. Rich informs them they are at $12,000, and an angry Cleon demands that the entire wait staff gather in his office immediately. Cleon starts by humiliating Rich in front of the staff, then yells at everyone for their poor results so far. Nuts begins acting weirder by spitting on Cleon's boxing trophy. To further motivate them, Cleon changes the prize for the top seller to $10,000 in cash, awarded at the end of the night. He also warns them that the bottom seller will earn themselves a beating from Cleon. After the staff leaves, Rich tries to explain to Cleon that he's making it worse by offering the money, but Cleon tells him to make the needed money or face a beating himself.

The staff begins using every trick they know to pad their customers' checks. Rich promotes an inebriated Donnie to a waiter and adds extra tables for him against his objections. Donnie makes a mess at his first table and then panics after Cleon stops him in the kitchen and reminds him that if he finishes last, Cleon will beat him. A panicked Donnie attempts to run away from the restaurant, only to be stopped by Cleon, who forces him to go back. Connor is embarrassed when the cast of the TV show he was fired from shows up to eat and get seated in his section. Connor corners his old boss in the restroom to ask why he was fired, and is angrily told off. Meanwhile, Guy grows impatient with a customer who won't order anything and gives the table to Donnie. Tara reminds Nuts to take his medication, but Rich distracts him, and he misses his dose. Nuts then transforms into his bizarre split personality Zongo. Zongo becomes a selling machine, moving Nuts from last place to first. The rest of the staff grab Zongo and force him to take his medication, transforming him back into Nuts. After Guy fills Nuts in on what he missed, Nuts runs to the bathroom and vomits out his medication, becoming Zongo again. Rich consumes a bowl of pasta made by Dave and finally expels the engagement ring.

Guy gets angry when Donnie overtakes him on the scoreboard. Desperate to avoid a beating, Guy sabotages both Donnie and Mia's biggest tables. Tara gets stiffed on her tip by pop star Nutella, pushing her out of first place. Connor finally delivers dessert to Marlon's table and watches in disgust as Marlon's girlfriend eagerly eats it. She finds the engagement ring and accepts Marlon's proposal. Zongo finally snaps and is knocked out by Cleon after attacking a customer and trying to force-feed him an entire fish. Rich asks Tara to check on Nuts, but instead, she admonishes him for how he has treated the staff because he's afraid of Cleon.

At closing time, the man at the table that Guy gave to Donnie leaves Donnie a $1,000 tip. Donnie refuses it at first, but the man explains that he is dying and that he appreciates that Donnie let him sit there without bothering him. The man is then trampled to death by Cleon's horse as he leaves the restaurant. Rich gathers the wait staff and announces Tara as the top seller, who is shocked to learn that Donnie gave her his $1,000 tip so she'd win. Cleon finds out that they only made $19,000 for the night and decides to take the waiters' tips to make up the difference. He also tells Tara that he lied about the $10,000 prize. Rich finally confronts Cleon, taking the waiter's tips back and demanding that he pay Tara. Tara realizes that Cleon only needed 20,000 yen ($170), not dollars. Cleon takes the $170 out, gives Tara her $10,000 prize, and then throws the rest up in the air for the waiters to fight over. Cleon is later shown with Guy tied up in his office, about to receive a beating for being last.

== Cast ==
Staff
- Michael Clarke Duncan as Cleon "Slammin'" Salmon, the owner of the restaurant
- Jay Chandrasekhar as Nuts, a waiter with an alternate personality known as Zongo
- Kevin Heffernan as Richardo "Rich" Perente, the manager
- Steve Lemme as Connor Rhodes, a waiter
- Paul Soter in a dual role as busboy Donnie Kanogi and his twin brother, executive chef Dave Kanogi
- Erik Stolhanske as Guy "Meat-drapes" Metdrapedes, a waiter
- Cobie Smulders as Tara, a waitress
- April Bowlby as Mia, a waitress
- Nat Faxon as Carl, the manager

Customers

- Will Forte as Horace, a terminally-ill avid reader.
- Lance Henriksen as Dick Lobo, a TV producer
- Sendhil Ramamurthy as Marlon Specter, a TV star
- Olivia Munn as Samara Dubois, Marlon's fiancée
- Vivica A. Fox as Nutella, a famous singer
- Morgan Fairchild as Herself
- Jeff Chase as Anthony
- Carla Gallo as Stacy
- Jim Gaffigan as Stanley Ballin
- Jim Rash as Disgusted Businessman
- Candace Smith as Mrs. Eva Salmon Parente
- Marc Evan Jackson as Dry Sack Customer

== Release ==
The film premiered at the Slamdance Film Festival on January 17, 2009. It was released to limited theaters in the United States on December 11, 2009. On April 13, 2010, the film was released on DVD and Blu-ray.

== Reception ==
The film received mostly negative reviews. Rotten Tomatoes reported that 35% of critics gave the film a positive review based on a sample of 26, and an average score of 4.9 out of 10. Neil Genzlinger of The New York Times praised Duncan's performance, but noted that many of the jokes in the film are tired and old. Michael O'Sullivan, writing for The Washington Post, noted that the film engages in "lowbrow insults and slapsticky shenanigans" and its humor "hovers around crotch level."
