= Kenneth Woods (disambiguation) =

Kenneth Woods may refer to:

- Kenneth Woods (born 1968), American musician
- Kenny Woods (born 1969), American musician
- Kenny Woods (footballer) (born 1974), English footballer, see List of Bury F.C. players (1–24 appearances)

== See also ==
- Ken Woods (born 1942), Australian lawn bowler
- Ken Wood
