= St. Thomas Church and Convent =

Historic church in Illinois, United States

- St. Thomas the Apostle Church
- U.S. National Register of Historic Places
- U.S. Historic district – Contributing property
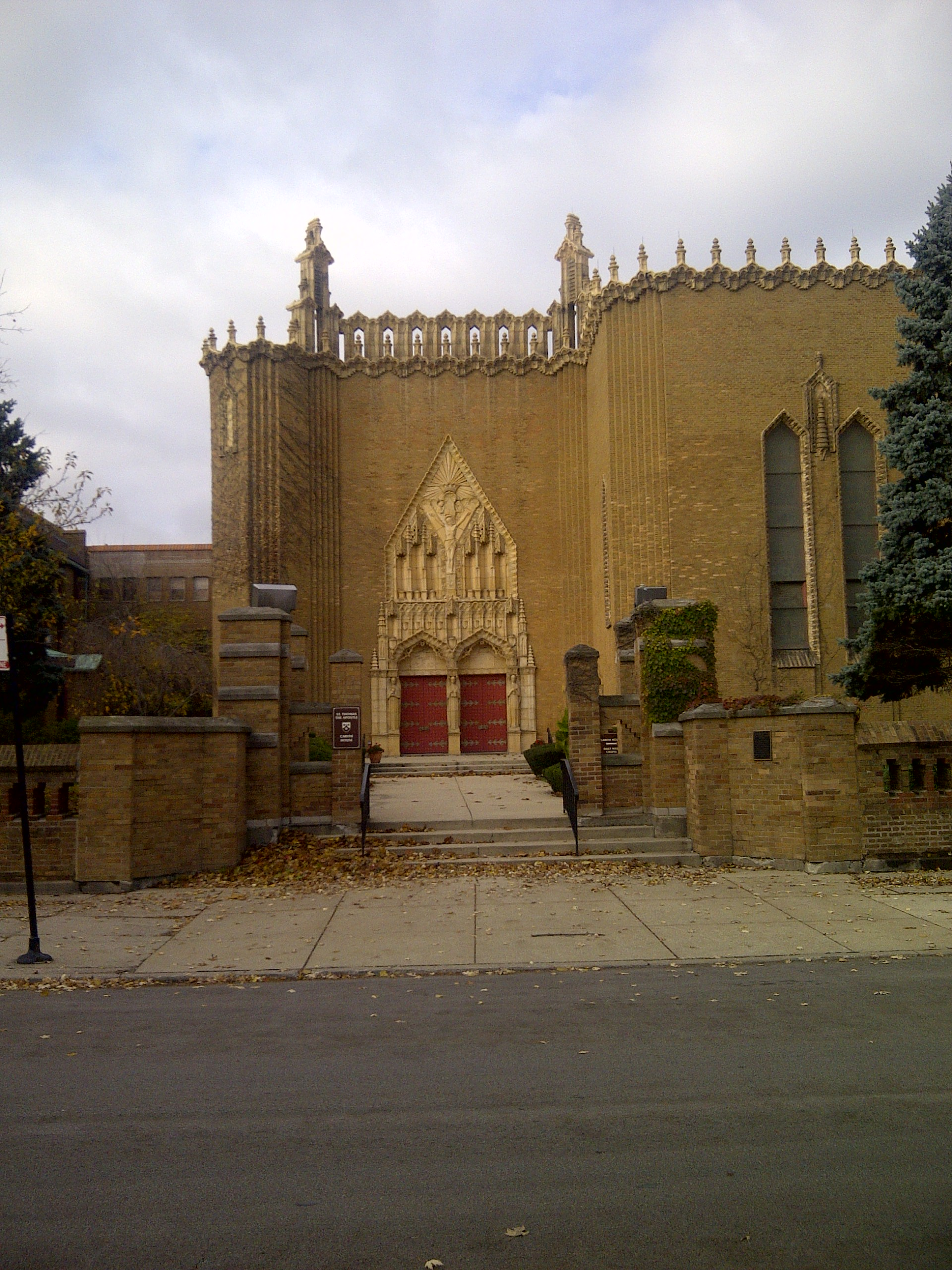

- Location within Chicago metropolitan area Location within Illinois Location within the United States
- Location: 5472 S. Kimbark Ave., Chicago, Illinois
- Coordinates: 41°47′44″N 87°35′43″W
- Area: less than one acre
- Built: 1922
- Architect: Barry Byrne
- Part of: Hyde Park–Kenwood Historic District (ID79000824)
- NRHP reference No.: 78001132
- Added to NRHP: December 18, 1978

St. Thomas the Apostle Church is a historic site at 5472 S. Kimbark Avenue in Hyde Park, Chicago, Illinois, at 55th Street.

A Roman Catholic church of the Archdiocese of Chicago, it was built in 1922 and opened in 1925 and added to the National Register of Historic Places in 1978. It was designed by Barry Byrne, who was a student of Frank Lloyd Wright and incorporated elements from Wright's Prairie School of design and from the modernist movement. Byrne had previously built the convent at St. Thomas Apostle in 1919. It was built during a period of liturgical renewal that was just reaching the U.S. It is often cited as anticipating the liturgical reforms of the Second Vatican Council by some 40 years due to its projecting altar and lack of interior columns.

== St. Thomas School ==
In 1886, following renovations to the church building, a parochial school was established, staffed by Dominican Sisters of Sinsinawa. By 1916, the school facilities were found to be inadequate and the parish began renting a nearby vacant public school building and in 1929, a new school was built. In 1980 the school merged with other nearby Catholic schools.

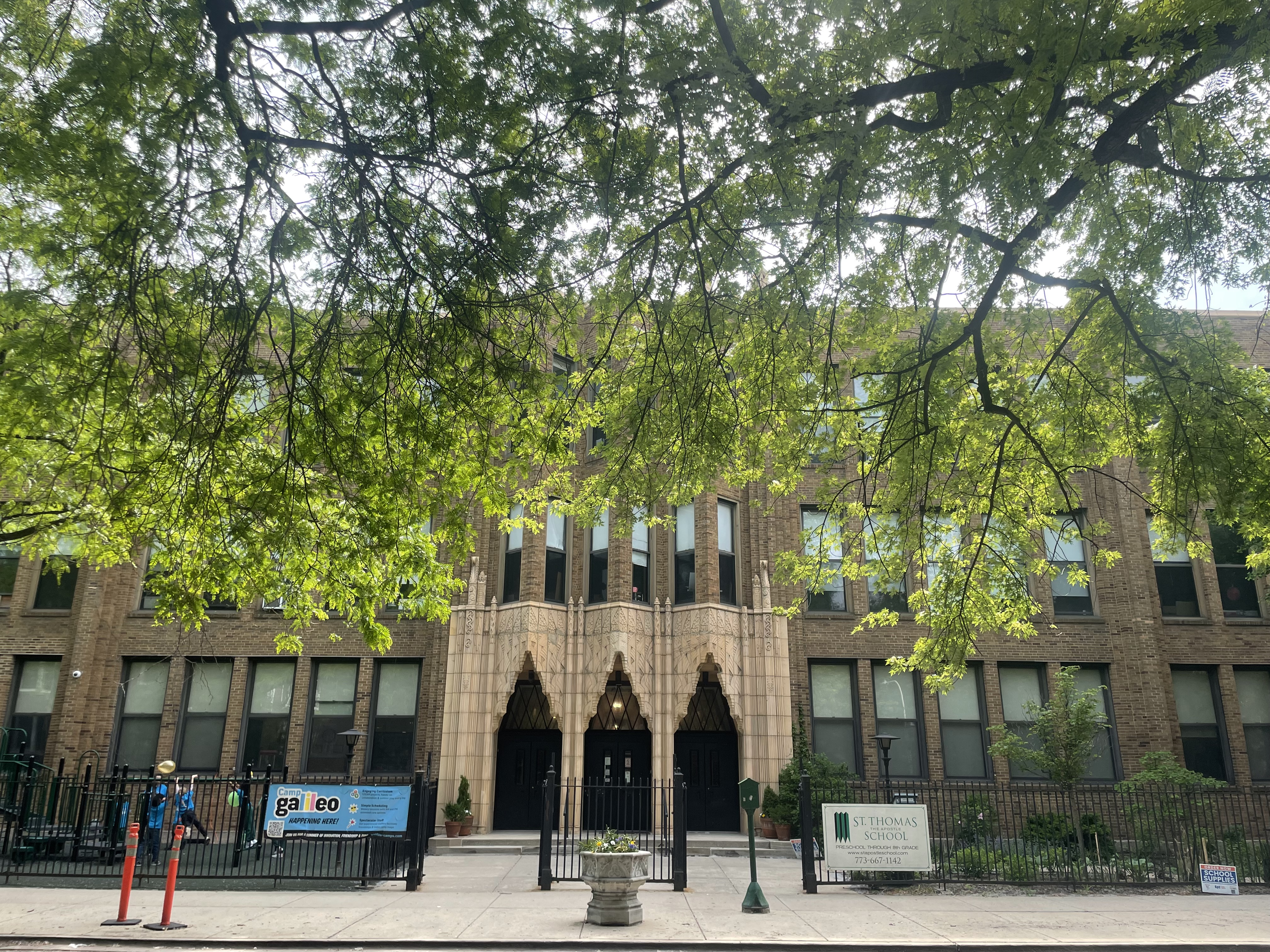
St. Thomas School

In 2021, the school was involved in controversy when reporting showed that the Augustinian-owned St. John Stone Friary, less than a block away, began to house James Ray, a priest of the Chicago archdiocese who had been accused of sexual abuse of minors multiple times, beginning in 2000. Neither Augustinian nor Archdiocese of Chicago officials raised the proximity of St. Thomas School as a possible concern, with church records incorrectly stating that there was no school in the immediate area of the friary. This is in spite of the fact that Ray had taken students out of class at prior assignments. While Augustinians at the friary understood the priest's case and the need for compliance with restrictions on his ministry, this was not communicated to school officials. The arrangement of the accused priest, James Ray, residing at the friary was approved by the provincial superior of the Augustinians, Robert Prevost, who would become Pope Leo XIV in 2025.
