= George Herbert Jones Laboratory =

- Room 405, George Herbert Jones Laboratory
- U.S. National Register of Historic Places
- U.S. National Historic Landmark
- U.S. Historic district – Contributing property
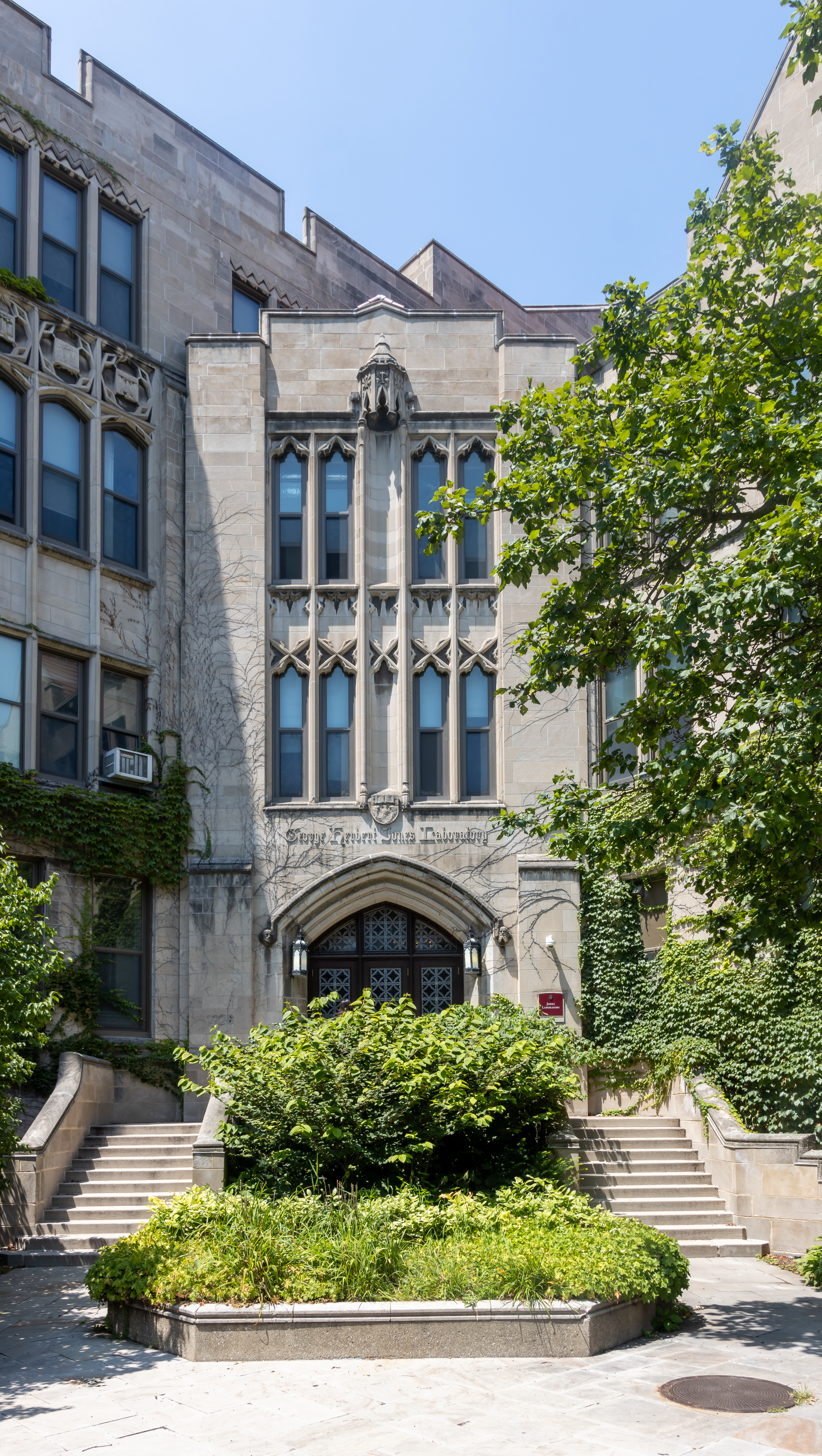
- George Herbert Jones Laboratory

- Location within Chicago metropolitan area Location within Illinois Location within the United States
- Location: 5747 S. Ellis Ave. Chicago, Illinois
- Coordinates: 41°47′24″N 87°36′4″W
- Built: 1942
- Part of: Hyde Park–Kenwood Historic District (ID79000824)
- NRHP reference No.: 67000005
- Added to NRHP: May 28, 1967

The George Herbert Jones Laboratory is an academic building at 5747 S. Ellis Avenue in Chicago, Illinois, on the main campus of the University of Chicago. Room 405 of the building was named a National Historic Landmark in 1967; it was the site where plutonium, the first man-made element, was isolated and measured.

== Description and history ==
The George Herbert Jones Laboratory is at the northwest corner of the main quadrangle of the University of Chicago campus, between East 58th and 57th Streets. It is a four-story masonry structure, built in 1928-29 as facility and instructional space for the university's staff of research chemists and graduate students in chemistry. Room 405 is a relatively non-descript chamber on the fourth floor, measuring 6 by 9 feet (1.8 m × 2.7 m), with shelves and counters lining its walls. It is accessed via a wooden door with a glass window in its upper half.

As part of the Manhattan Project under the United States Department of War, University of Chicago chemists began to study the newly manufactured radioactive element, plutonium. Room 405 was the site where, for the first time on August 18, 1942, a team led by physicist Glenn Seaborg isolated a trace quantity of this new element. Measurements, performed on September 10, 1942, enabled chemists to determine the new element's atomic weight. This important step was to change the world, making possible both nuclear power and nuclear weapons. Seaborg later said of this event: "These memorable days will go down in scientific history to mark the first sight of a synthetic element, and the first isolation of a weighable amount of an artificially produced isotope of any element."

The U.S. Department of Energy remediated Jones Laboratory in the 1980s by studying and removing almost all of the building's World War II-era radioactive waste. The remediation took place in 1982, 1983, and 1987.

Although room 405 looks nothing like the original condition, the lobby of the laboratory maintains a collection of the specialized equipment used to perform the measurements. Although the building's basement and ground floor were significantly damaged by an explosion in 1973, Room 405 was not affected.

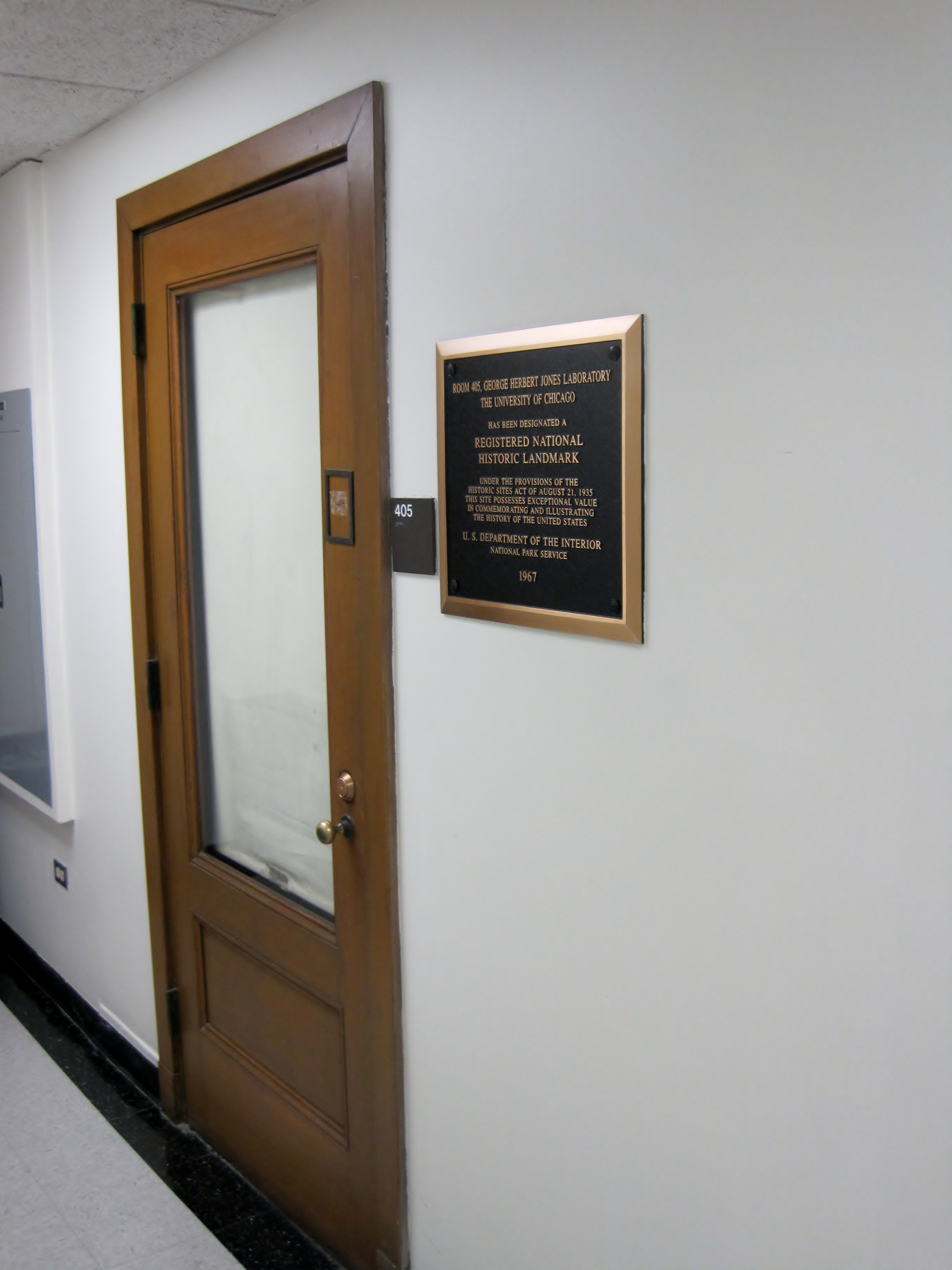
Room 405

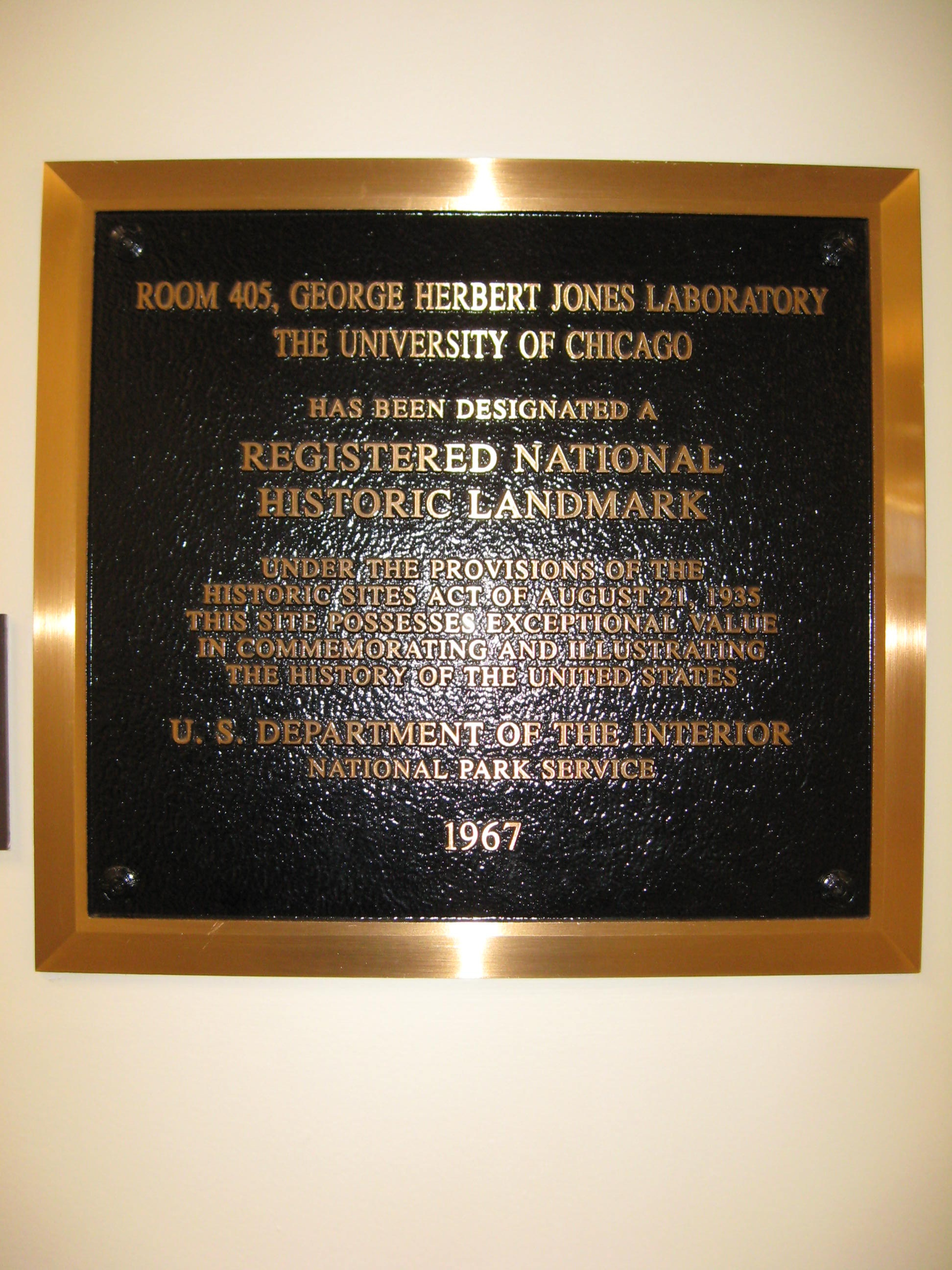
National Historic Landmark Dedication Plaque

University President Robert Maynard Hutchins (left) and namesake donor George Herbert Jones (right) pose with a bust of Jones during the dedication of the building in December 1929
