= Michael Clarke Duncan =

American actor (1957–2012)

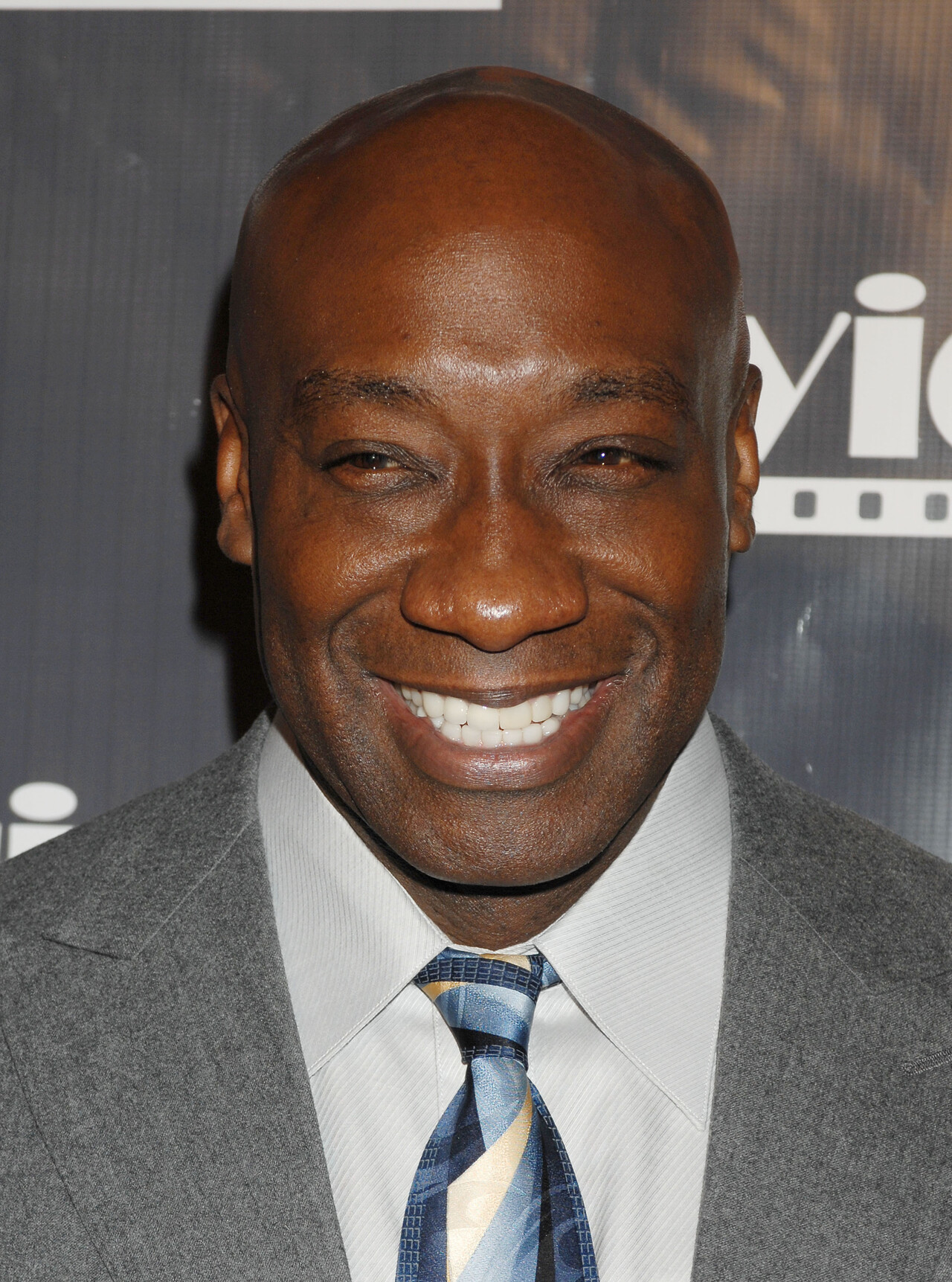
- Duncan in 2009
- Born: December 10, 1957; Chicago, Illinois, U.S.
- Died: September 3, 2012 (aged 54); Los Angeles, California, U.S.
- Resting place: Forest Lawn Memorial Park (Hollywood Hills), California, U.S.
- Occupation: Actor
- Years active: 1994–2012
- Partner: Omarosa Manigault Newman (2010–2012)

Michael Clarke Duncan (December 10, 1957 – September 3, 2012) was an American actor best known for his breakout role as John Coffey in The Green Mile (1999), for which he was nominated for the Academy Award for Best Supporting Actor and other honors. He also played Kingpin in Daredevil and Spider-Man: The New Animated Series (both 2003). In addition, he appeared in movies such as Armageddon (1998), The Whole Nine Yards (2000), Planet of the Apes (2001), The Scorpion King (2002), Sin City (2005), and Talladega Nights: The Ballad of Ricky Bobby (2006), as well as in the role of Leo Knox in the television series Bones (2011) its spin-off The Finder (2012); and also in episodes of Two and a Half Men. His voice roles in films included Brother Bear (2003), The Land Before Time XI: Invasion of the Tinysauruses (2005), Brother Bear 2 (2006), Kung Fu Panda (2008), and Green Lantern (2011); he had the voice role of Benjamin King in the video game Saints Row (2006).

== Early life ==
Duncan was born in Chicago and raised in a single-parent household along with his sister, Judy, by his mother, Jean Duncan (a house cleaner) after his father left. When he was young, he wanted to play football for the Chicago Bears of the National Football League (NFL) but decided to become an actor instead when his mother refused to let him play, fearing he would get injured. He always wanted to act but had to drop out of the communications program at Alcorn State University to support his family when his mother became ill.

Duncan's large frame, 6 feet 5 inches (196 cm) and 315 pounds (143 kg) helped him in his jobs digging ditches for Peoples Energy and as a bouncer at several Chicago clubs. He also played basketball at Kankakee Community College and, for one season, for the Alcorn State Braves.

In 1979, he participated in the Disco Demolition Night at Comiskey Park, home of the Chicago White Sox, where he was among the first 100 people to run onto the field and slide into third base. During the ensuing riot, his silver belt buckle was stolen while he was stealing a baseball bat from the dugout.

== Career ==
Duncan took various security jobs in Los Angeles while trying to get some acting and modeling work in commercials. During this time, he worked as a bodyguard for celebrities like Will Smith, Martin Lawrence, Jamie Foxx, LL Cool J, and The Notorious B.I.G., all the while doing bit parts in television and films. When rapper Notorious B.I.G. was killed in 1997, Duncan quit the personal protection business.

After beginning his career with several bit parts playing bouncers in films such as Bulworth and A Night at the Roxbury, Duncan came to prominence when he was cast as Bear in the blockbuster Michael Bay action film Armageddon (1998). During the production of the film, he became friends with cast mate Bruce Willis, and it was Willis' influence that helped him get his breakout role as the gentle giant John Coffey in the Frank Darabont film The Green Mile (1999). Starring with Tom Hanks, Duncan's performance netted him an Academy Award nomination for Best Actor in a Supporting Role, and a Golden Globe nomination for Best Performance by an Actor in a Supporting Role in a Motion Picture.

Following his role as Coffey, Duncan was then cast in a string of films that helped to establish him as an actor in both action and comedy roles: The Whole Nine Yards (2000), See Spot Run (2001), Planet of the Apes (2001), The Scorpion King (2002) and Daredevil (2003), where he played Kingpin.

When Duncan was cast as Kingpin in 2002, he faced the dual challenge of portraying a typically white character, having to gain 40 pounds (18 kg) to fit the character's large physique. In July 2006, Duncan showed interest in returning for the role of Kingpin, but stated that he would not be willing to regain the weight that he had lost. In 2009, he stopped eating meat and later appeared in a PETA ad campaign, touting the health benefits and his increased strength from a vegetarian diet.

In 2005, Duncan appeared in The Island and Sin City, in which he played Manute, a powerful mobster. Critic Roger Ebert praised him for his performance in The Island, writing that '[Duncan] has only three or four scenes, but they're of central importance, and he brings true horror to them.' Duncan appeared in a supporting role in the 2006 comedy Talladega Nights: The Ballad of Ricky Bobby as Lucius Washington, and in 2009, he played Balrog in Street Fighter: The Legend of Chun-Li and starred as the titular Cleon "Slammin'" Salmon in Broken Lizard's farce The Slammin' Salmon.

With his deep voice, Duncan did voice roles for films such as Brother Bear (2003) and its sequel Brother Bear 2 (2006), Kung Fu Panda (2008), and Green Lantern (2011); playing the voice of Kilowog from DC Comics alongside Ryan Reynolds.

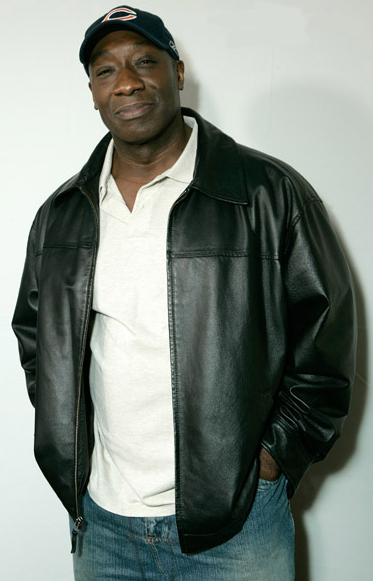
Duncan in 2009

His other voice roles include TV series such as Loonatics Unleashed and Operation: Z.E.R.O., Quiznos commercials, and a number of video games such as Demon Stone, SOCOM II U.S. Navy SEALs, The Suffering: Ties That Bind, Saints Row, Soldier of Fortune, and God of War II, where he provided the voice of the Titan Atlas. He additionally reprised his role as the Kingpin in Spider-Man: The New Animated Series.

In addition to his film roles, Duncan guest starred in a number of television shows including Coach Little in an episode of The Suite Life of Zack & Cody and a first season episode of CSI: NY. In 2008, he appeared as Mr. Colt in the second season premiere of Chuck, "Chuck Versus the First Date" and as a guest star on two episodes of Two and a Half Men. Most notably, in April 2011, he guest starred on an episode of the TV series Bones as Leo Knox, which, in 2012, led to him receiving his first starring role as the same character in the spinoff series The Finder. The Bones Season 8 episode "The Partners in the Divorce", which aired three weeks after his death, was dedicated to him.

== Personal life ==
Duncan trained in Brazilian jiu-jitsu at the Gracie Academy in Torrance, California, and held a purple belt. At the time of his death, Duncan was dating reality television personality Omarosa Manigault. His family later claimed that Manigault changed his will and testament, manipulated Duncan in his final days, lied about their engagement, and sold his belongings without the family's knowledge. In 2013, Omarosa appeared in the cast of The All-Star Celebrity Apprentice and played in Duncan's honor for his favorite charity and one he had benefited from himself, the Sue Duncan Children's Center. In episode two of the season, Omarosa won $40,000 for the charity.

== Death ==
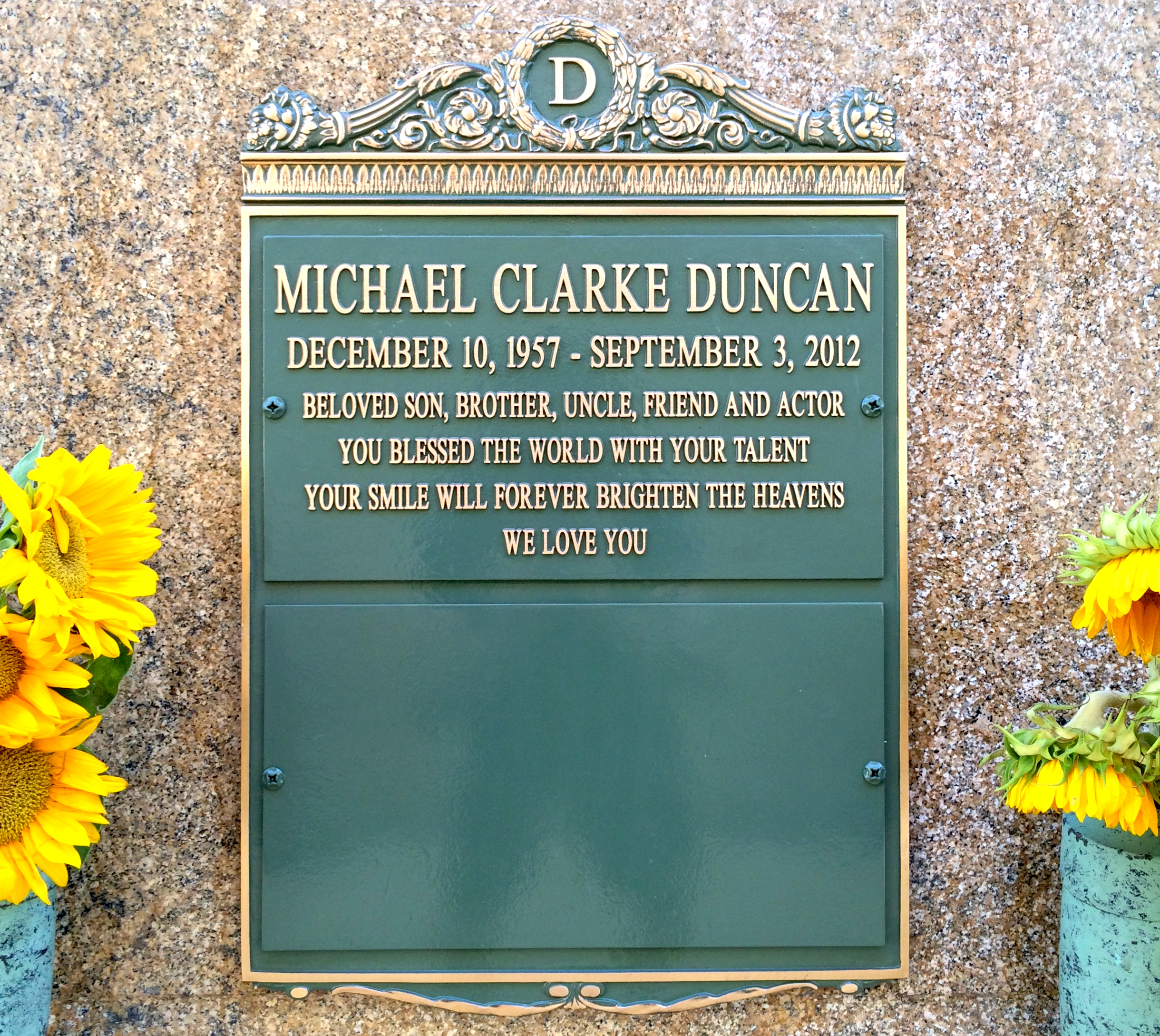
Crypt of Duncan at Forest Lawn Hollywood Hills

Duncan was taken to Cedars-Sinai Medical Center after suffering a heart attack on July 13, 2012. By August 6, 2012, he had been moved from the intensive care unit but remained hospitalized. On September 3, 2012, while in the hospital, Duncan died of respiratory failure. He was 54 years old.

On September 10, 2012, a private funeral was held for Duncan in Los Angeles. Among the attendees at his memorial service were Tom Hanks, Jack Black, Christopher Showerman, comedian Jay Leno, and professional wrestler Mark Henry, the latter having served as one of the pallbearers. He was interred at Forest Lawn Memorial Park, Hollywood Hills.

== Filmography ==
=== Films ===
Year	Title	Role	Notes
1995	Friday	Craps Player (uncredited)	
1997	Back in Business	Huge Guard	
1998	Caught Up	"Big Black"	
1998	The Players Club	Bodyguard	Credited as Big Mike Duncan
1998	Bulworth	Bouncer	Credited as Michael "Big Mike" Duncan
1998	Armageddon	"Bear"	
1998	A Night at the Roxbury	Roxbury Bouncer	Credited as Michael "Big Mike" Duncan
1999	The Underground Comedy Movie	Gay Virgin	
1999	Breakfast of Champions	Eli	Credited as Michael Duncan
1999	The Green Mile	John Coffey	Broadcast Film Critics Association Award for Best Supporting Actor; Saturn Award for Best Supporting Actor; Black Reel Award for Best Supporting Actor; Nominated—Academy Award for Best Supporting Actor; Nominated—Chicago Film Critics Association Award for Best Supporting Actor; Nominated—Chicago Film Critics Association Award for Most Promising Actor; Nominated—Golden Globe Award for Best Supporting Actor – Motion Picture; Nominated—NAACP Image Award for Outstanding Actor in a Motion Picture; Nominated—MTV Movie Award for Best Breakthrough Performance; Nominated—Online Film Critics Society Award for Best Supporting Actor; Nominated—Screen Actors Guild Award for Outstanding Performance by a Male Actor in a Supporting Role; Nominated—Screen Actors Guild Award for Outstanding Performance by a Cast in a Motion Picture
2000	The Whole Nine Yards	Franklin "Frankie Figs" Figueroa	
2001	See Spot Run	Murdoch	
2001	Cats & Dogs	Sam	Voice
2001	Planet of the Apes	Colonel Attar	
2001	They Call Me Sirr	Coach Griffin	TV movie
2002	The Scorpion King	Balthazar	
2003	Daredevil	Wilson Fisk / "Kingpin"	
2003	George of the Jungle 2	Mean Lion	Voice, direct-to-video
2003	Brother Bear	Tug	Voice
2003	Kim Possible: A Sitch in Time	Future Wade	Voice
2004	D.E.B.S.	Mr. Phipps	
2004	George and the Dragon	Tarik	
2004	Pursued	Franklin	
2005	Racing Stripes	Clydesdale	Voice
2005	Sin City	Manute	
2005	The Golden Blaze	Thomas Tatum / "Quake"	
2005	Dinotopia: Quest for the Ruby Sunstone	Stinktooth	Voice, direct-to-video
2005	The Island	Starkweather Two Delta / Jamal Starkweather	
2005	Stewie Griffin: The Untold Story	The Stork	Voice, direct-to-video
2005	The Land Before Time XI: Invasion of the Tinysauruses	Big Daddy	Voice, direct-to-video
2006	Talladega Nights: The Ballad of Ricky Bobby	Lucius Washington	
2006	Brother Bear 2	Tug	Voice, direct-to-video
2006	School for Scoundrels	Lesher	
2006	One Way	The General	
2006	Air Buddies	Wolf	Voice
2007	The Last Mimzy	Nathanial Broadman	
2007	Slipstream	Mort / Phil Henderson / Patrolman	
2008	Welcome Home Roscoe Jenkins	Otis Jenkins	
2008	Delgo	Elder Marley	Voice
2008	Kung Fu Panda	Commander Vachir	Voice
2008	American Crude	Spinks	
2009	The Slammin' Salmon	Cleon Salmon	
2009	Street Fighter: The Legend of Chun-Li	Balrog	
2010	Redemption Road	Augy	
2010	Cats & Dogs: The Revenge of Kitty Galore	Sam	Voice; cameo
2011	Cross	Erlik	Direct-to-video
2011	A Crush on You	Jim "Big Jim" Nelson	TV movie
2011	Green Lantern	Kilowog	Voice
2011	Legend of Kung Fu Rabbit	Slash	Voice; English dub posthumously released in September 2013
2012	In the Hive	Mr. Hollis	Posthumous release
2013	A Resurrection	Addison	Posthumous release
2013	From the Rough	Roger	Posthumous release
2015	The Challenger	Duane Taylor	Posthumous release; final film role

=== Television ===
Year	Title	Role	Notes
1995	The Bold and the Beautiful	"Slash"	2 episodes
1995	Renegade	"Shake"	Episode: "Living Legend"
1995	The Fresh Prince of Bel-Air	"Tiny"	Episode: "Bourgie Sings the Blues"
1995	Married... with Children	Bouncer	Episode: "Flight of the Bumblebee"
1996	Skwids	Body Builder	
1996	Weird Science	Cardinal Carnage	Episode: "Men in Tights"
1997	The Jamie Foxx Show	Inmate	Episode: "Little Red Corvette"
1997	Sparks	Frank	Episode: "Self Defense"
1997	The Wayans Bros.	Mike "Big Mike"	Episode: "I Do..."
1997	Living Single	Security Guard	Episode: "High Anxiety"
1997	Built to Last	Unknown	Episode: "A Family Affair"
1998	Arliss	Lucian Balboa	Episode: "Fans First"
1999	Sister, Sister	Earl "Big Earl"	Episode: "Before There Was Hip Hop..."
2002	King of the Hill	Coach Webb	Episode: "The Son Also Roses"
2003, 2005	The Adventures of Jimmy Neutron: Boy Genius	Commander Baker	Voice, 2 episodes
2003	Spider-Man: The New Animated Series	Wilson Fisk / "Kingpin"	Voice, episode: "Royal Scam"
2003	The Proud Family	Mongo	Voice, episode: "Smackmania 6: Mongo vs. Mama's Boy"
2004	Static Shock	Rashid "The Rocket" Randall	Voice, episode: "Linked"
2004	The Fairly OddParents	Rockwell	Voice, episode: "Crash Nebula"
2004	George Lopez	Dr. Holland	Episode: "George to the Third Power"
2005–2007	Loonatics Unleashed	Massive	Voice, 3 episodes
2005	Teen Titans	Hayden / Krall	Voice, episode: "Cyborg the Barbarian"
2005	CSI: NY	Quinn Sullivan	Episode: "The Closer"
2006–2012	Family Guy	Black Co-Worker / Boy On Mushrooms / Wrong-Sounding Fozzie Bear / The Stork	Voice, 4 episodes
2006	Minoriteam	Balactus	Episode: "Balactus: Part 1" and "Balaztus: Part 2"
2008–2009	Two and a Half Men	Jerome Burnette	Episodes: "The Mooch at the Boo", "The Two Finger Rule"
2008	The Suite Life of Zack & Cody	Coach Little	Episode: "Benchwarmers"
2008	Chuck	Colt	Episode: "Chuck Versus the First Date"
2011	Bones	Leo Knox	Episode: "The Finder"
2012	The Finder	Leo Knox	13 episodes
2012	The High Fructose Adventures of Annoying Orange	Chunkee Cheeses / Marshmallow King	Voice, 2 episodes
2013	Ultimate Spider-Man	Groot	Voice, episode: "Guardians of the Galaxy"; posthumous release; dedicated in memory
2013	Fish Hooks	Guardian Cat	Voice, episode: "Labor of Love"; posthumous release

=== Video games ===
Year	Title	Role	Notes
1995	Varuna's Forces	Carl Tomas	Unreleased title for 3DO Interactive Multiplayer, Atari Jaguar CD, Dreamcast, PC, PlayStation and Sega Saturn
1995	Panic in the Park	Security Guard	—N/a
2000	Star Trek: Klingon Academy	Opening Movie Klingons	—N/a
2000	Soldier of Fortune	"Hawk"	—N/a
2003	SOCOM II U.S. Navy SEALs	SEAL Operative WARDOG	Credited as Michael Clark Duncan
2003	Brother Bear	Tug	—N/a
2004	Forgotten Realms: Demon Stone	Slaad Lord Ygorl	—N/a
2005	The Suffering: Ties That Bind	"Torque" \ Blackmore	—N/a
2006	Saints Row	Benjamin King	—N/a
2007	God of War II	Atlas	—N/a
2013	Saints Row IV	Benjamin King	Credited as Benjamin King in the game's credits in memoriam to him

=== Music videos ===
Year	Artist	Title	Role	Notes
1994	Quo featuring Redman	"Huh What"		
1995	Quo	"Quo Funk"		
1995	R. Kelly featuring The Isley Brothers	"Down Low (Nobody Has to Know)"	Security Guard	Cameo
