= Hyde Park–Kenwood Historic District =

Historic district in Illinois, United States

- U.S. National Register of Historic Places
- U.S. Historic district
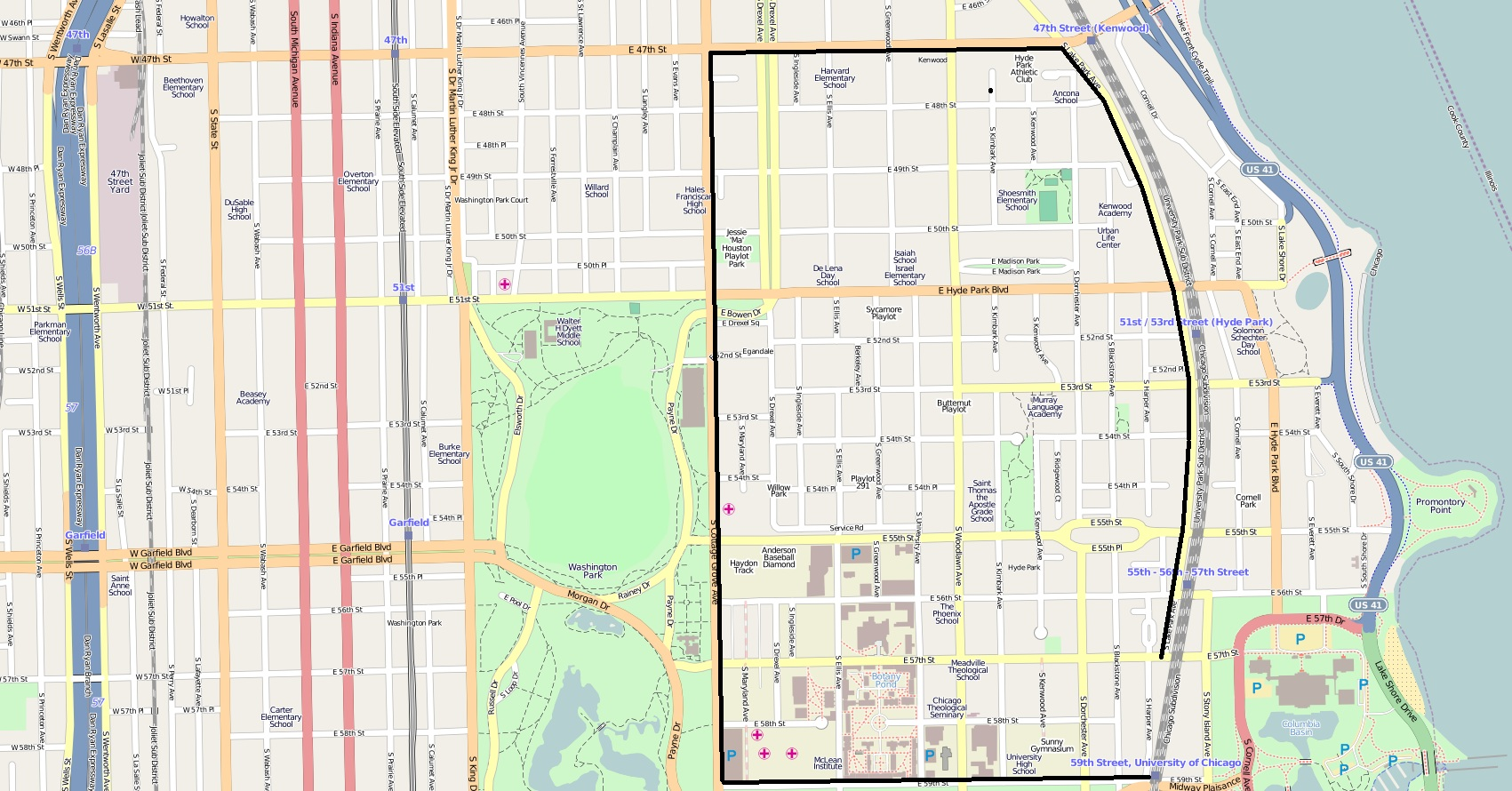
- Rough boundaries of the district

- Location within Chicago metropolitan area
- Location: Roughly bounded by 47th and 59th Sts., Cottage Groves and Lake Park Aves., Chicago, Illinois
- Coordinates: 41°47′56″N 87°35′51″W
- Area: 745 acres (301.5 ha)
- Built: 1885
- Built by: Multiple
- Architect: Multiple
- Architectural style: Late 19th And 20th Century Revivals, Prairie School, Late Victorian
- NRHP reference No.: 79000824
- Hyde Park–Kenwood Historic District (Boundary Increase I and II)
- U.S. National Register of Historic Places
- U.S. Historic district
- Location: 821–829 and 816–826 E. 49th St., Chicago, Illinois (increase 1); 825–833 and 837–849 E. Fifty-second St., Chicago, Illinois (increase 2)
- Area: 1 acre (0.4 ha)
- Built: 1916, 1924
- Architect: France, Roy F.; Northquist, R.A., Holpuch, Joseph A., Co.
- Architectural style: Mission/Spanish Revival, Other, Courtyard Apartments
- NRHP reference No.: 79000824 (original); 84000996 (increase 1); 86001041 (increase 2)

Significant dates
- Added to NRHP: February 14, 1979
- Boundary increases: August 16, 1984; May 16, 1986

Hyde Park–Kenwood Historic District is a National Register of Historic Places (NRHP) district on the South Side of Chicago that includes parts of the Hyde Park and Kenwood community areas of Chicago, Illinois. The northern part of this district overlaps with the officially designated Chicago Landmark Kenwood District. This northern part of the Hyde Park–Kenwood Historic District contains the Chicago home of Barack Obama. The entire district was added to the NRHP on February 14, 1979, and expanded on August 16, 1984, and May 16, 1986. The district is bounded to the north, south, east and west, respectively by 47th Street, 59th Street, Lake Park Avenue and Cottage Groves Avenue. Despite the large amount of property associated with the University of Chicago, the Hyde Park–Kenwood Historic District is mostly residential. The district is considered to be significant for its architecture and education.

Among the Hyde Park–Kenwood Historic District's contributing properties are numerous NRHP listings in Hyde Park: Frank R. Lillie House, Isidore H. Heller House, Amos Jerome Snell Hall and Charles Hitchcock Hall, Arthur H. Compton House, Chicago Pile-1, St. Thomas Church and Convent, Frederick C. Robie House, George Herbert Jones Laboratory and Robert A. Millikan House. No NRHP listings from Kenwood are within the historic district's boundaries. The NRHP-listed University Apartments are also within the district. Additionally, Chicago Pile-1 and Robie House, which are in the district, are two of the four Chicago Registered Historic Places from the original October 15, 1966 NRHP list.

== See also ==
- National Register of Historic Places listings in South Side Chicago
