= Ken Wood (rugby league) =

Australian rugby league footballer

Personal information
- Full name: Kenneth Thomas Wood
- Born: 15 May 1906 Petersham, New South Wales, Australia
- Died: 11 November 1942 (aged 36) Kokoda Track, New Guinea

Playing information
- Position: Centre, Lock, Wing
Club
Years	Team	Pld	T	G	FG	P
1928–34	North Sydney	68	15	0	0	45
Representative
Years	Team	Pld	T	G	FG	P
1930	Metropolis	1	1	0	0	3
- Source: As of 28 February 2019
- Military career
- Allegiance: Australia
- Branch: Australian Army
- Service years: 1940-1942
- Unit: Second Australian Imperial Force
- Conflicts: World War II; Kokoda Track

Kenneth Thomas Wood (15 May 1906 – 11 November 1942) was an Australian rugby league footballer who played in the 1920s and 1930s. He played for North Sydney in the NSWRL competition.

== Background ==
Wood was born in Petersham, New South Wales on 15 May 1906.

== Playing career ==
Wood made his first grade debut for North Sydney against St George in Round 14 1928 at the Sydney Cricket Ground. In 1928, Norths finished 4th on the table and qualified for the finals. Wood scored a try in the club's semi final defeat against Eastern Suburbs.

Wood played representative football for Metropolis against New Zealand in 1930. Wood played with Norths up until the end of 1934 before retiring.

== Post playing ==
Wood enlisted in the Australian Army in 1940 whilst he was living in Brisbane, Queensland.

== Death ==
Wood served in World War II and fought on battles in the Kokoda Track against the Japanese. On 11 November 1942, Wood was killed in action and was later buried at the Bomana war cemetery in Port Moresby.
