= North Kenwood District =

Historic district in Chicago, Illinois

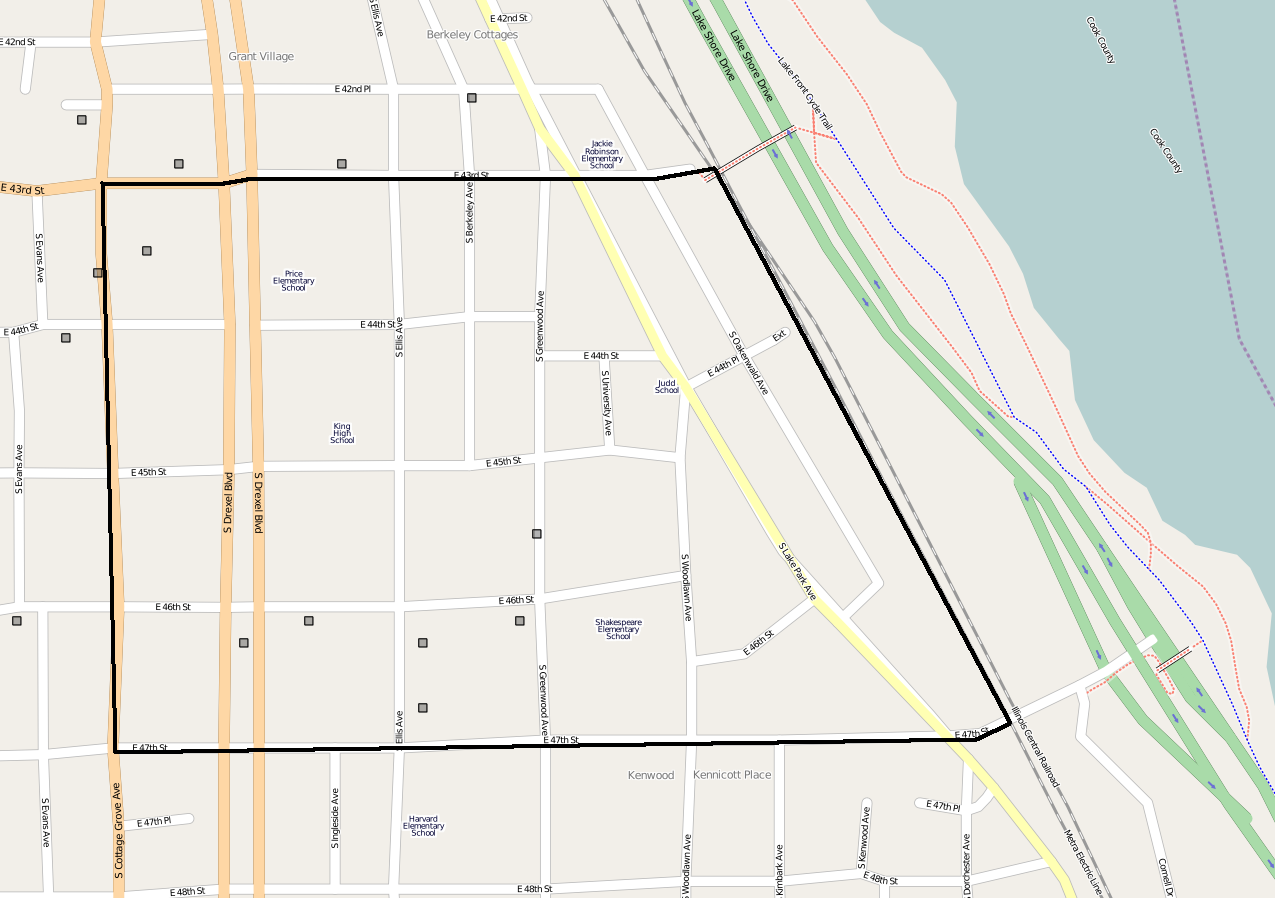
Streetmap of district

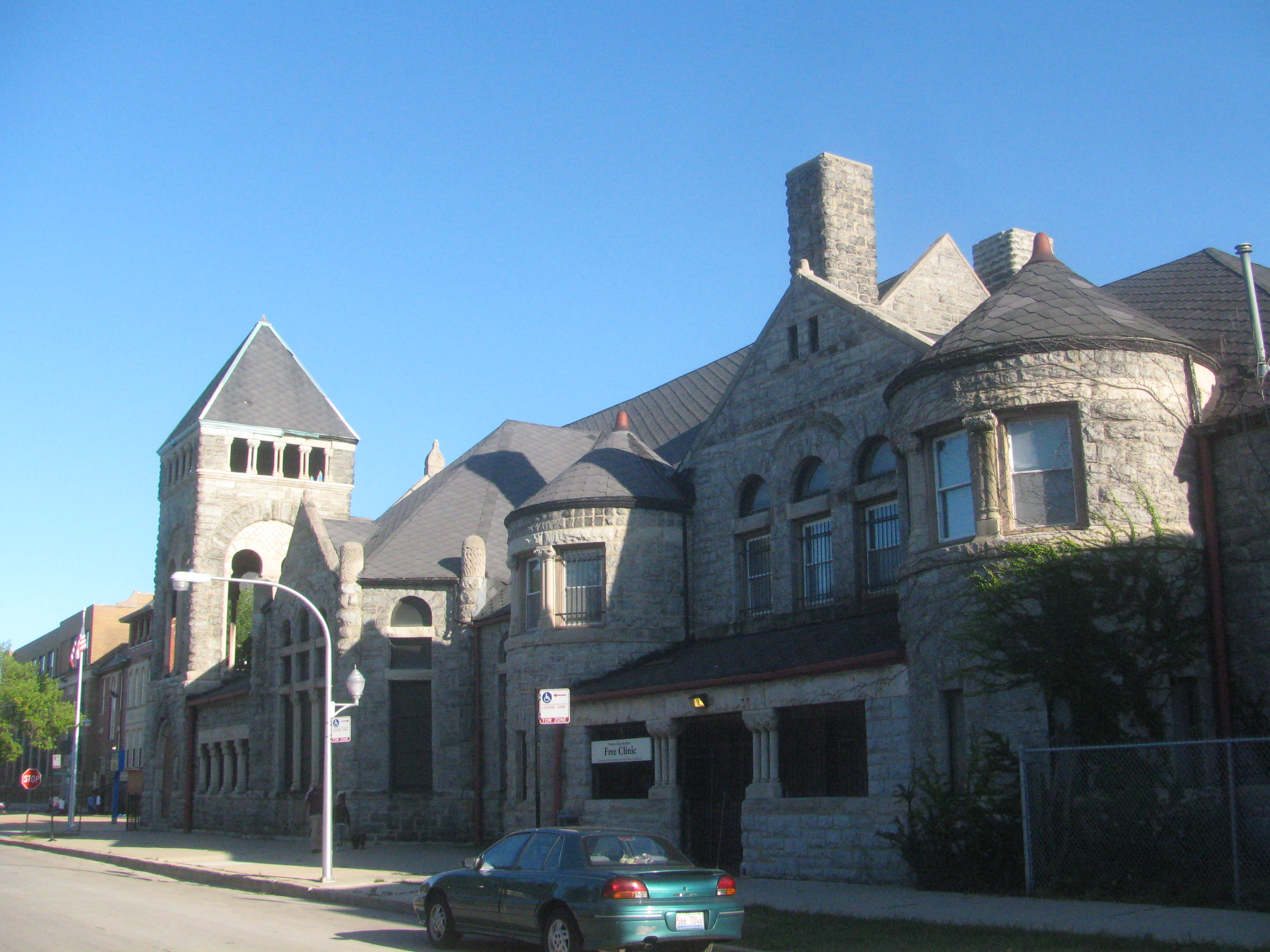
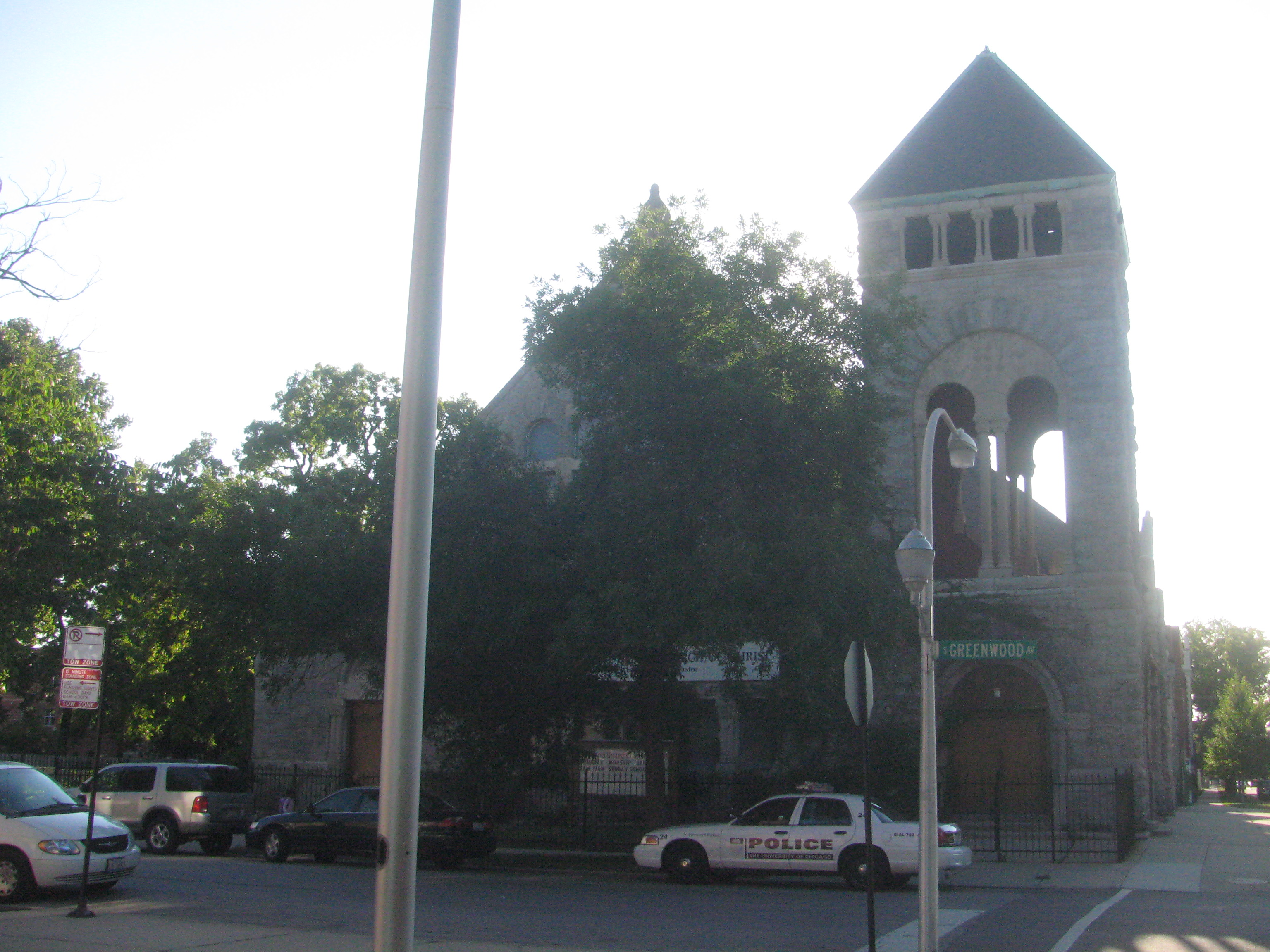
Kenwood Evangelical Church from west (left) and east (right)

The North Kenwood District is a historic district within the Kenwood community area of South Side, Chicago, Illinois.

== Description ==
It includes the 4500-block of South Berkeley, as well as surrounding historic structures in an area bounded by 43rd Street, 47th Street, Cottage Grove, and the Illinois Central Railroad tracks.

The Kenwood Evangelical Church, which is listed on the National Register of Historic Places is in this neighborhood.

The area was designated a Chicago Landmark district on June 9, 1993.

== See also ==
- Kenwood District
- National Register of Historic Places listings in Chicago, Illinois
