= Kenwood Evangelical Church =

Historic church in Illinois, United States

- U.S. National Register of Historic Places
- Chicago Landmark
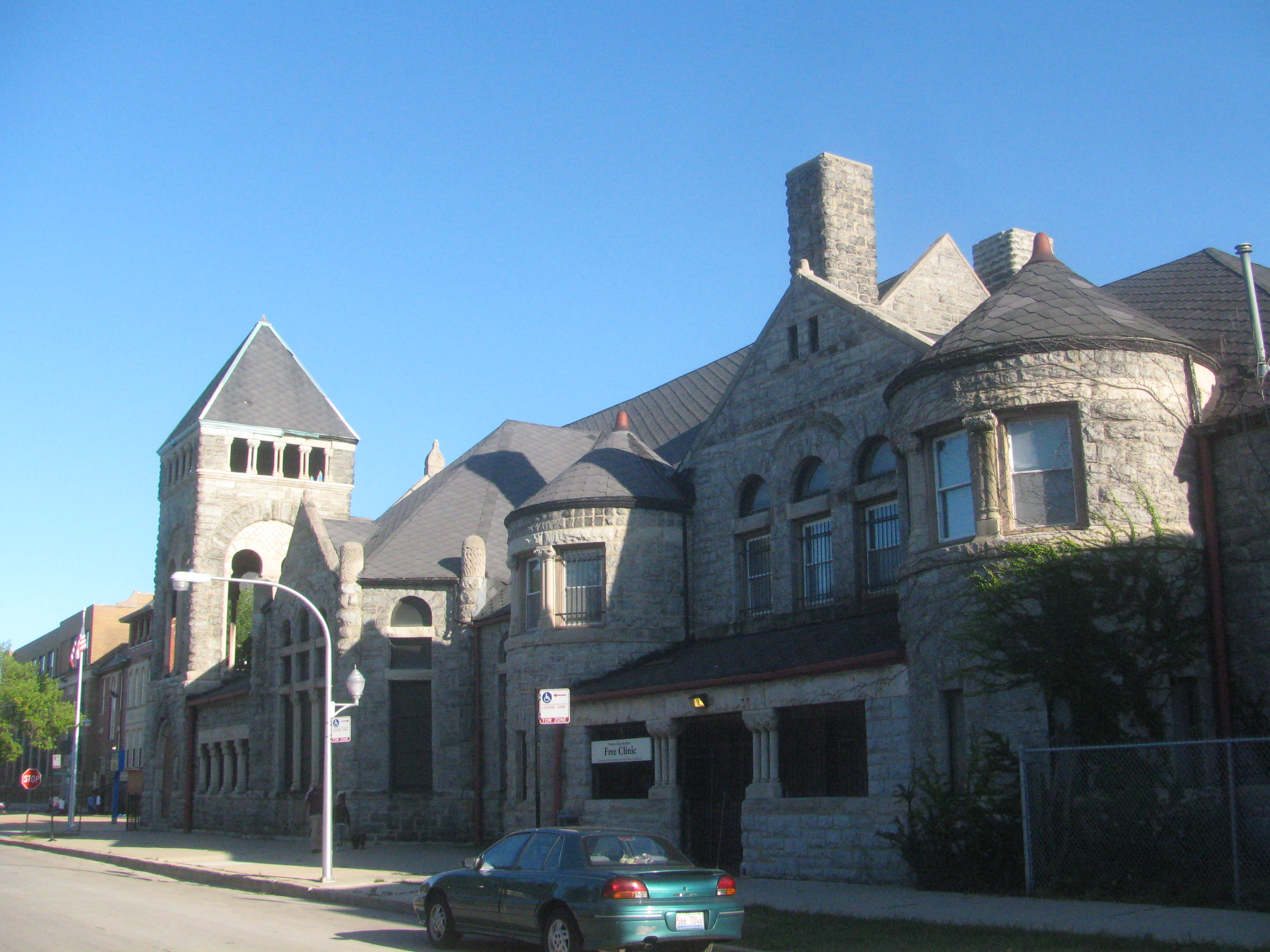

- Location within Chicago metropolitan area Location within Illinois Location within the United States
- Location: 4600--4608 S. Greenwood Ave., Chicago, Illinois
- Coordinates: 41°48′41″N 87°36′0″W
- Area: less than one acre
- Built: 1887
- Architect: William W. Boyington; H.B. Wheelock
- Architectural style: Romanesque
- NRHP reference No.: 91000570

Significant dates
- Added to NRHP: May 16, 1991
- Designated CHICL: October 5, 2011

Kenwood United Church of Christ (formerly known as Kenwood Evangelical Church) is a congregation of the United Church of Christ that worships in a historic church building at 4600-4608 South Greenwood Avenue in Chicago, Illinois.

The Romanesque building was constructed in 1887 and added to the National Register of Historic Places in 1991.

The church is also a designated Chicago Landmark, as of October 5, 2011.
