= Kenwood District =

Coordinates: 41°48′22″N 87°35′48″W

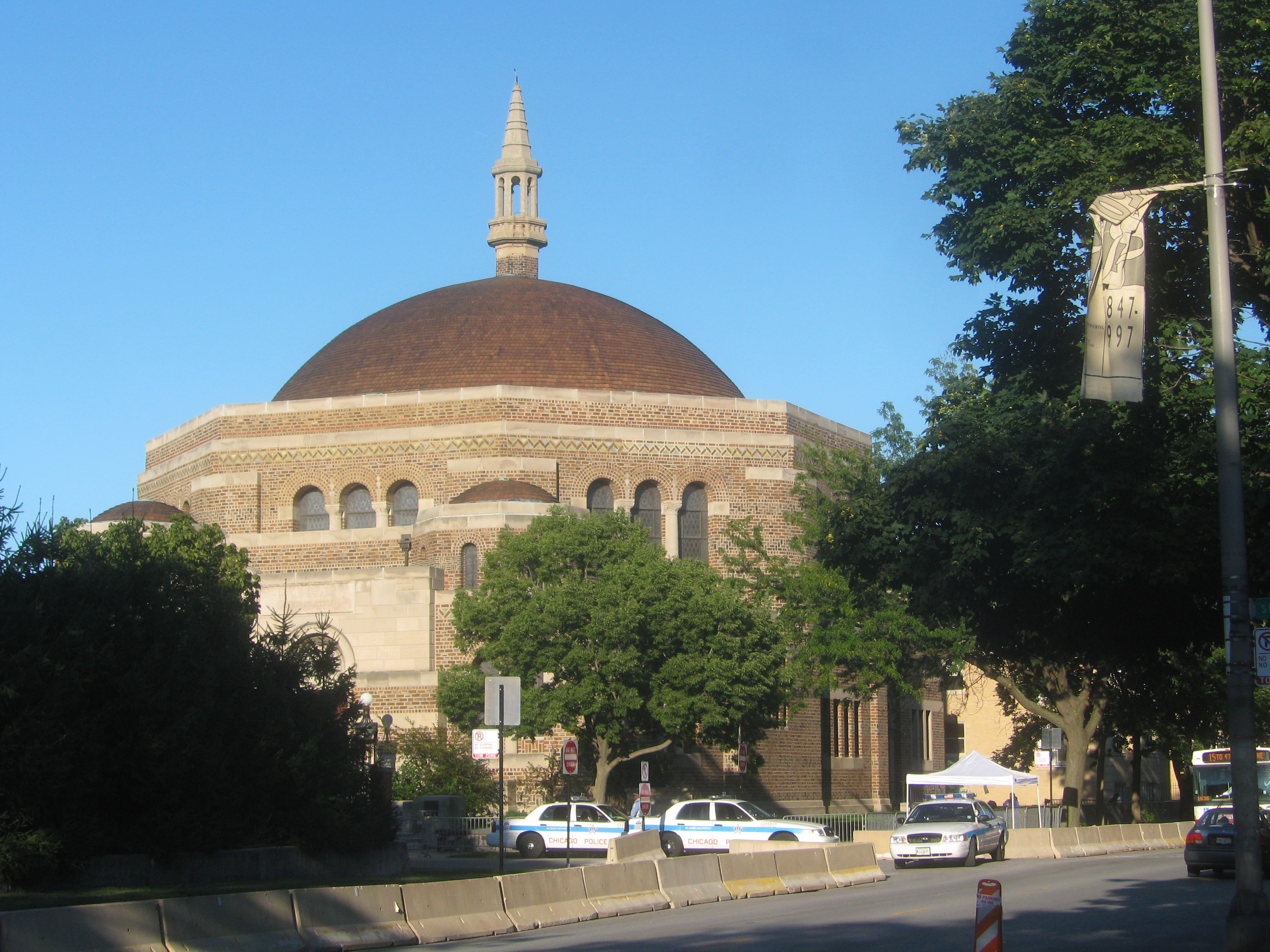
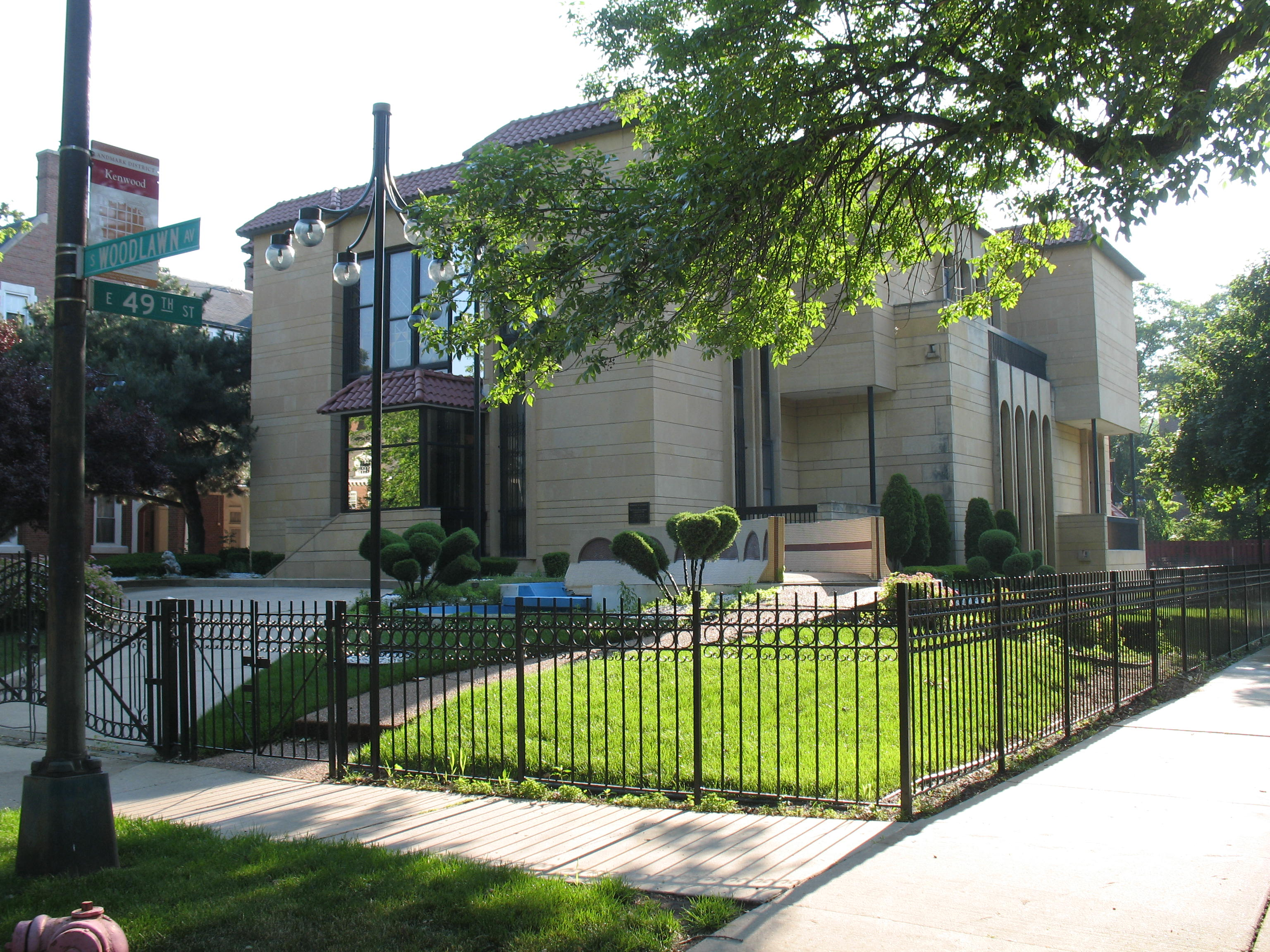
- K.A.M. Isaiah Israel Temple and Barack Obama security detail The Residence of Muhammad was built in 1973 for Elijah Muhammad.

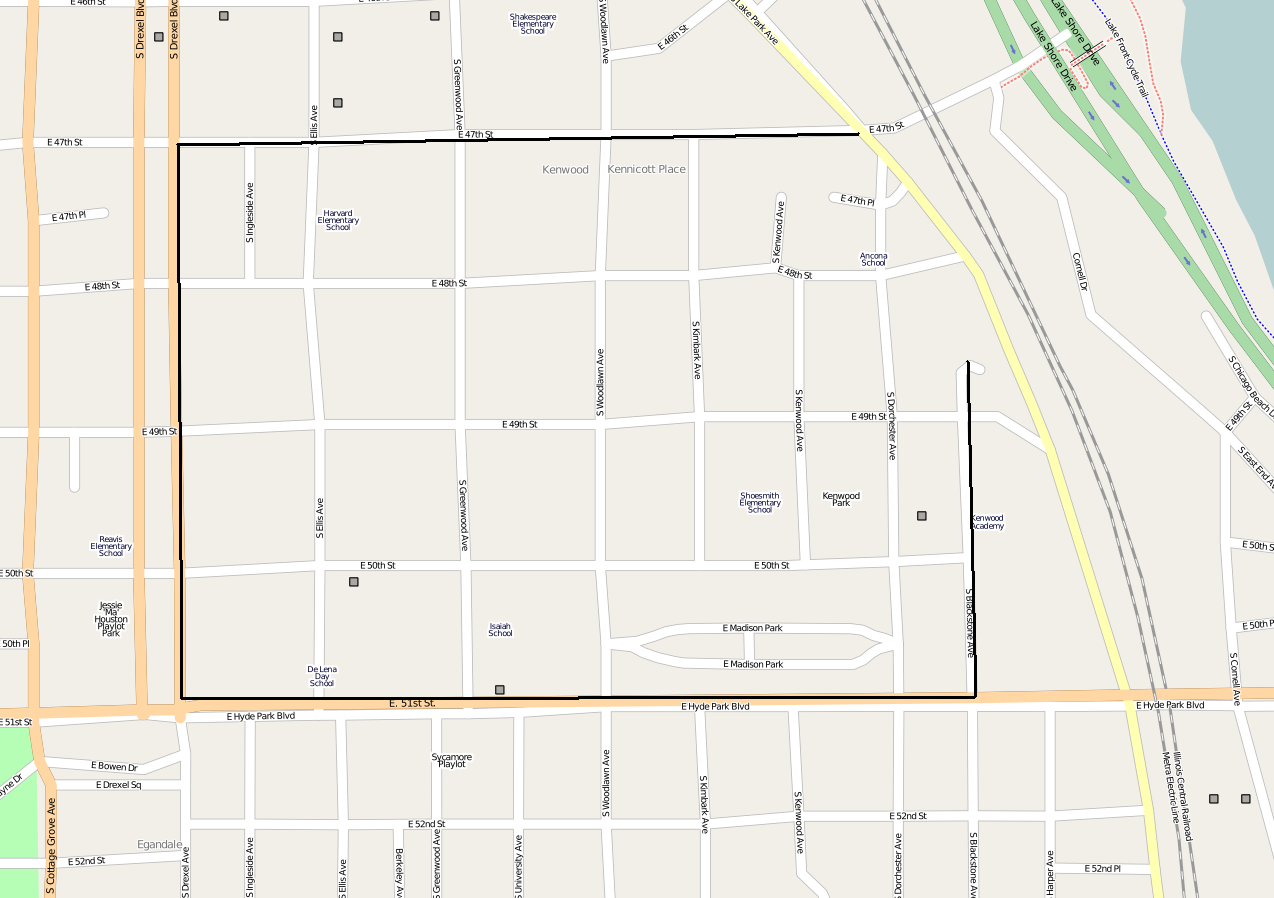
- Country: United States
- State: Illinois
- County: Cook
- City: Chicago

The Kenwood District is a historic district in the officially designated Kenwood community area of Chicago, Illinois bounded by E. 47th and E. 51st Streets, S. Blackstone and S. Drexel Avenues. It was designated a Chicago Landmark on June 29, 1979. The official community areas were defined in the early 20th century and the current meaning of the Hyde Park neighborhood includes the area between 47th Street and 51st Street ("E. Hyde Park Blvd.") as a part of Hyde Park, although this area is officially the south half of the official Kenwood neighborhood. The region is part of the Hyde Park-Kenwood Historic District.

== See also ==
- North Kenwood District - Landmark District in North Kenwood
