= Terrible twos =

Terrible twos may refer to:

- A child development stage which normally occurs around the age of two; see Toddler § Emotions and self-image
- The Terrible Twos, an American children's music band
- A 1982 novel by Ishmael Reed
- A book by Sarah Kennedy
- Episode 6 of Season 4 of the American sitcom Dinosaurs

== See also ==
- The Terrible Two, a 2018 American film written and directed by Billy Lewis
