= Hell Ride =

- Promotional poster
- Directed by: Larry Bishop
- Written by: Larry Bishop
- Produced by: Larry Bishop; Shana Stein; Michael Steinberg
- Starring: Larry Bishop; Michael Madsen; Vinnie Jones; David Carradine; Dennis Hopper
- Cinematography: Scott Kevan
- Edited by: Blake West; William Yeh
- Music by: Daniele Luppi
- Production company: Dimension Films
- Distributed by: Third Rail Releasing
- Release date: August 8, 2008
- Running time: 83 minutes
- Country: United States
- Language: English
- Box office: $390,128

Hell Ride is a 2008 American action/neo-outlaw biker film written and directed by Larry Bishop, and starring Bishop, Michael Madsen, Dennis Hopper, Eric Balfour, Vinnie Jones, Leonor Varela and David Carradine. It was released under the "Quentin Tarantino Presents" banner. The film is an homage to the original outlaw biker films of the 1960s and 1970s.

== Plot ==
Biker Pistolero is the leader, or "Prez", of the Victors, a Southern California motorcycle gang. He has two faithful lieutenants, The Gent and the young Comanche.

In 1976, Cherokee Kisum, the girlfriend of Pistolero (then known as Johnny) is viciously murdered by The Deuce and Billy Wings, leaders of the arch-rival gang the Six-Six-Six'ers, as a message to the Victors. The Deuce later moves into large scale business efforts, leaving the biker life behind and the Sixers dry up as a gang. Cherokee has also hidden away a small fortune from under-the-table drug deals she made behind the Deuce's back - another reason behind her murder. The stash of money is intended for her young son, who disappears after her death.

Years later, after The Deuce returns to the area to close up unfinished business and Billy Wings reforms the Sixers in Los Angeles, the rival gang infiltrates the Victors in an attempt to take over their territory. One member from 1976, St. Louie, is murdered in the same manner as Cherokee Kisum. Bob the Bum, the Victors' treasurer, is similarly killed. Pistolero then begins to make moves to eliminate the Sixers and finally gain his revenge. While loyal bikers are killed by the Sixers, the more treacherous and less faithful Victors try to influence The Gent, Comanche, and Goody Two-Shoes to switch sides - or kill them. Goody Two-Shoes is eventually killed after being located and chased down by Billy Wings.

With the aid of his beautiful & mysterious "medicine woman" Nada and his old friend and ally Eddie Zero, Pistolero and the remaining Victors try to locate and kill The Deuce, Billy Wings and the Sixers before they themselves are killed.

== Cast ==
- Larry Bishop as Johnny "Pistolero", The Victors M.C.
- Michael Madsen as "The Gent", The Victors M.C.
- Dennis Hopper as Eddie "Zero" / Scratch, The Victors M.C.
- Eric Balfour as Sonny "Comanche" Kisum / Bix, The Victors M.C.
  - Austin Galuppo as Young Sonny Kisum
- Vinnie Jones as Billy "Wings", The 666ers M.C.
- Leonor Varela as Nada
- Michael Beach as "Goody Two-Shoes", The Victors M.C.
- Laura Cayouette as Dani
- Julia Jones as "Cherokee" Kisum
- Francesco Quinn as "Machete"
- Cristos as "Speed"
- Allison McAtee as "The Swede"
- Cassandra Hepburn as Maria
- David Carradine as "The Deuce", The 666ers M.C.
- Pete Randall as Louie "St. Louie", The Victors M.C.
- Dean Delray as "Ape-Shit", The Victors M.C.
- Lee Alfred as "Joint", The Victors M.C.
- David Grieco as "Dr. Cement", The Victors M.C.
- Kanin Howell as "Opium"
- Michael Macecsko as "Shyster"
- Terry Fradet as "Holy Smoke"
- Steve McCammon as Bob "The Bum"
- Theresa Alexandria as Carmen
- Andrea Fellers as "Echo"
- Alyson Sullivan as Gigi
- Tracy Phillips as Yvonne
- Maja Mandzuka as Danka
- Amber Hay as "Flower" (uncredited)
- Claudia Salinas as Angelina (uncredited)
- Natasha Yi as Jucinda (uncredited)
- Diana Prince as Topless Waitress (uncredited)

== Production notes ==
Larry Bishop's character Pistolero is named after the original title for Robert Rodriguez’s Desperado. The dialogue spoken by the character Nada (Leonor Varela) is made up almost entirely of double entendres and clichés.

Bishop took extra duties on this film by not only starring in it, but also writing, directing and co-producing with producers Michael Steinberg and Shana Stein, and executive producer Quentin Tarantino. This film is Bishop's modern-day take on those 1960s motorcycle flicks he used to turn out for B-movie masters American International Pictures. It is the project Tarantino inspired Bishop to begin some five and a half years before, when he told Bishop: "It is your destiny to write, direct and star in a movie". Tarantino also assured Bishop that he would help to produce his film.

== Release ==
Hell Ride premiered at the 2008 Sundance Film Festival. It had a brief theatrical run via Third Rail Releasing before being released to DVD worldwide.

== Reception ==
On the review aggregator website Rotten Tomatoes, 10% of 59 critics' reviews are positive, with an average rating of 3.5/10. The website's consensus reads: "Hell Ride misses out on the rusting zeitgeist of the biker genre, sucking the glee from a saucy premise." Metacritic, which uses a weighted average, assigned the film a score of 25 out of 100, based on 19 critics, indicating "generally unfavorable" reviews.

Michael Phillips of the Chicago Tribune gave the film a negative review, writing, "Hell Ride should've been a scuzzy disreputable low-budget hoot, flying down the highway at 110 m.p.h. Instead it revs its engine for 83 minutes in a cul-de-sac." Roger Ebert of the Chicago Sun-Times gave it one out of four stars and wrote, "The movie was executive produced by Quentin Tarantino. Shame on him. He intends it no doubt as another homage to grindhouse pictures, but I've seen a lot of them, and they were nowhere near this bad."
