= All Rise (TV series) =

American television series (2019–2023)

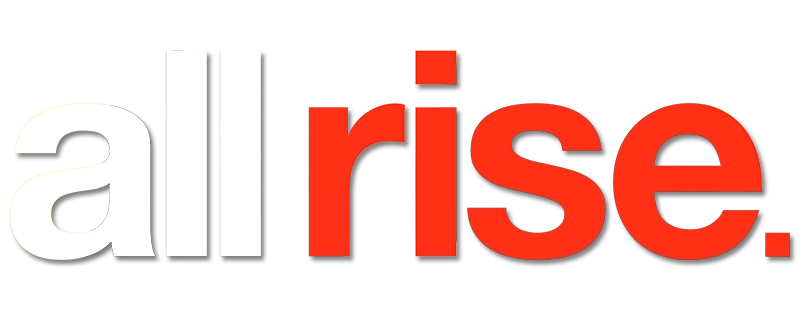
- Genre: Legal drama
- Created by: Greg Spottiswood
- Based on: Courtroom 302 by Steve Bogira
- Developed by: Greg Spottiswood
- Starring: Simone Missick; Wilson Bethel; Jessica Camacho; J. Alex Brinson; Ruthie Ann Miles; Lindsay Mendez; Marg Helgenberger; Lindsey Gort; Audrey Corsa; Reggie Lee
- Composer: Joey Newman
- Country of origin: United States
- Original language: English
- No. of seasons: 3
- No. of episodes: 58

Production
- Executive producers: Greg Spottiswood; Michael M. Robin; Leonard Goldstein; Sunil Nayar; Lydia Woodward; Simone Missick; Oprah Winfrey; Denitria Harris-Lawrence
- Producer: Ronald Chong
- Camera setup: Single-camera
- Running time: 44 minutes
- Production companies: Shimmering Pictures (seasons 1–2); Skyemac Productions; Tall Baby Productions; CBS Studios (seasons 1–2); Harpo Films (season 3); Warner Bros. Television Studios

Original release
- Network: CBS
- Release: September 23, 2019 – May 24, 2021
- Network: OWN
- Release: June 7, 2022 – November 18, 2023

All Rise is an American legal drama television series created and developed by Greg Spottiswood for CBS and later the Oprah Winfrey Network. It aired from September 23, 2019, to November 18, 2023.

In May 2021, the series was canceled by CBS after two seasons before being picked up for a third season by the Oprah Winfrey Network (OWN) that September. The third season premiered on June 7, 2022. In August 2023, it was announced that the third season would be its final season. The series finale aired on November 18, 2023.

== Premise ==
All Rise revolves around the personal lives of judges, prosecutors, and public defenders in a Los Angeles courthouse.

The plot follows newly appointed Judge Lola Carmichael, a highly regarded and impressive former deputy district attorney who does not intend to sit back on the bench in her new role but instead leans in, immediately pushing the boundaries and challenging the expectations of what a judge can be.

== Cast ==
=== Main ===
- Simone Missick as Lola Carmichael, an idealistic former prosecutor and newly appointed judge of the Los Angeles County Superior Court. In her new role, she immediately pushing the boundaries and challenging the expectations of what a judge can be. Lola is married to Robin Taylor, an FBI agent, and gives birth to their first baby in season 2, Bailey. She was arrested during a Black Lives Matter protest for defending a girl who was being threatened and was about to be arrested without reason.
- Wilson Bethel as Mark Callan, a deputy district attorney in the Los Angeles County District Attorney's Office and Lola's best friend. Mark is in a relationship with Amy Quinn. He came under scrutiny in season 2 for going after the LA Sheriff's office for a wrongful shooting. He is promoted to chief deputy district attorney in season 3.
- Jessica Camacho as Emily Lopez (formerly Emily Lopez-Batista), an attorney with the Los Angeles County Public Defender's office who is in a relationship with Luke Watkins.
- J. Alex Brinson as Luke Watkins, a four-year deputy sheriff working as a court bailiff to Judge Charmichael while attending law school. He joins the district attorneys office after passing the bar in season 2 and later joins the public defenders office in season 3. He is in a relationship with Emily Lopez.
- Lindsay Mendez as Sara Castillo, a court reporter and friend of Emily Lopez. She moves to the DA office as a victim's advocate in season 3.
- Ruthie Ann Miles as Sherri Kansky, an experienced judge's assistant assigned to new Judge Lola Carmichael despite their difficult relationship.
- Marg Helgenberger as Lisa Benner (seasons 1–2; special guest season 3), a veteran supervisory judge in the HOJ who is a mentor to Lola. She is later confirmed as a Justice to the California Court of Appeal which she transfers to in season 3.
- Lindsey Gort as Amy Quinn (seasons 2–3; recurring season 1), a high-powered criminal defense attorney who shares a complicated history with Mark and who also later becomes Mark's girlfriend. Amy leaves her law firm to join Rachel's law firm. She and Mark get engaged at the end of season 2 and married in the Series Finale.
- Audrey Corsa as Samantha Powell (season 2; recurring season 1), a clerk for the LA County DA's office who works with Mark and Luke
- Reggie Lee as Thomas Choi (season 2; recurring season 1; guest season 3), the chief deputy district attorney and Mark's supervisor. He is promoted and transferred to Pomona in between seasons 2 and 3.

=== Recurring ===
- Mitch Silpa as Clayton Berger (season 1; guest season 2–3), a hard-charging deputy district attorney who clashes with Lola
- Tony Denison as Vic Callan (season 1; guest seasons 2–3), Mark's father and a small-time bookie who gives Mark a hard time
- Paul McCrane as Jonas Laski (seasons 1–2; guest season 3), a conservative judge known as the "Punisher". He dislikes Mark for apparently injuring him during a game of hockey and has since always given Mark a difficult time prosecuting in his courtroom.
- Suzanne Cryer as Maggie Palmer (seasons 1–2; guest season 3), an old colleague of Lola's and current deputy district attorney who accuses her of bias towards defendants.
- Todd Williams (seasons 1–2) and Christian Keyes (season 3) as Robin Taylor, Lola's husband who works for the FBI.
- Joe Williamson as Kevin Harris (season 1; guest season 2), a LAPD detective and romantic interest for Sherri
- Peter MacNicol as Albert Campbell (seasons 1–2), a judge who is one of Lola's colleagues
- Ryan Michelle Bathe as Rachel Audubon (seasons 1–2; special guest season 3), a rare powerhouse attorney who can handle both civil litigation and criminal law and who has known Lola since they were in Howard University together and has been best friends with Mark since they were in law school together. She goes to Los Angeles to start her own law firm known as Audubon and Associates, later renamed Audubon, Quinn, and Associates in season 3, after she makes Amy Quinn a partner.
- Patricia Rae as Abigail Delgado (seasons 1–3), a judge who is one of Lola's colleagues
- Nicholas Christopher as David Sanders (seasons 1-3), Judge Benner's former campaign manager
- L. Scott Caldwell as Roxy Robinson (seasons 1–2), Lola's mother.
- Brent Jennings as Charles Carmichael (seasons 1, 3), Lola's father
- Bret Harrison as Ben Benner (season 1), Judge Benner's son and Sara's boyfriend
- Rebecca Field as Carol Coleman (season 2; guest seasons 1, 3)
- Samantha Marie Ware as Ness Johnson (seasons 2–3), Lola's new law clerk. She later joins Audubon, Quinn, and Associates in season 3.
- Shalim Ortiz as Joaquin Luna (season 2)
- Ian Anthony Dale as Louis Bravo (seasons 2–3), the Los Angeles County District Attorney
- Steven Williams as Tony Carver (season 2; guest seasons 1, 3)
- Louis Herthum as Wayne McCarthy (season 2), a corrupt sheriff responsible for encouraging and covering up police misconduct among his deputies. He believes that it is ok for police to bend or break the law for their benefit because of their badge and self sacrifices for the job.
- Anne Heche as Corrine Cuthbert (season 2; guest season 3) A police union representative and a defense attorney who represented Deputy Rashel and Sheriff Wayne McCarthy. She adamantly believes that McCarthy was not guilty of any of his crimes, and she repeatedly denies whenever policemen are accused/guilty of misconduct or illegal acts. She and McCarthy seemingly both believe that it is ok for police to bend or break the law for their benefit because of their badge and self sacrifices for the job.
- Ashley Jones as Whitney Gessner (season 2)
- Nev Scharrel as Nikki Gessner (season 2)
- Rick Fox as August Fox (season 2)
- Roger Guenveur Smith as Marshall Thomas (season 3), a judge
- Ronak Gandhi as Teddy Biswas (season 3)
- Sean Blakemore as André Armstrong (season 3)

=== Notable guest stars ===
- Colin Ford as Billy Webb ("Fool for Liv")
- Jere Burns as Adam Pryce, an over-theatrical attorney to several Hollywood stars. ("Fool for Liv", "Bette Davis Eyes")
- Ever Carradine as Felice Bell, Lola's old nemesis from her days as a district attorney. ("How to Succeed in Law Without Really Re-trying")
- Alicia Coppola as Wanda Taylor ("What the Constitution Greens to Me")
- Brenda Strong as Jean Rubenstein-Frost, Judge Benner's lawyer ex-girlfriend. ("My Fair Lockdown")
- Dorian Missick as Tailwind Turner ("Dancing at Los Angeles"), a DJ
- Tyler Barnhardt as Jesse Frost ("A Changes Is Gonna Come" and "Keep Ya Head Up")
- Robyn Lively as Nancy Frost ("A Changes Is Gonna Come" and "Keep Ya Head Up")
- Joel Gretsch as Frank Frost ("A Changes Is Gonna Come" and "Keep Ya Head Up")
- Lesley Ann Warren as Samara Strong, an actress whom Mark idolized whom he prosecutes for the murder of her husband ("Bette Davis Eyes")
- Amy Acker as Georgia Jennings ("Georgia" and "Leap of Faith")
- Ray Wise as Richard Walker ("Georgia")
- Sarah Levy as Debbie Daines ("Georgia")
- Charlayne Woodard as Prudence Jenkins ("Caught Up in Circles"), a judge
- Isaiah Johnson as Leon Parson ("The Perils of the Plea" and "Bounceback")

== Episodes ==
=== Series overview ===
Season	Episodes		Originally released		
Season	Episodes		First released	Last released	Network
1	21		September 23, 2019	May 4, 2020	CBS
2	17		November 16, 2020	May 24, 2021	CBS
3	20	10	June 7, 2022	August 9, 2022	OWN
3	20	10	September 16, 2023	November 18, 2023	OWN

=== Season 1 (2019–20) ===
No. overall	No. in season	Title	Directed by	Written by	Original release date	Prod. code	U.S. viewers (millions)
1	1	"Pilot"	Michael M. Robin	Greg Spottiswood	September 23, 2019	T15.10156	6.03
On her first day as a judge, Lola Carmichael decides not to accept a plea deal after public defender Emily Lopez argues that the arresting officer, Det. Jackie Leyland, framed her client Daphne Rivas for theft; after being pressured by the police chief not to charge Leyland, Judge Carmichael instead forces both the defense and the prosecution to submit new evidence that contradicts the officer's testimony, allowing Rivas to go free; she then warns Leyland never to lie in her courtroom again. DDA Mark Callan is set to try a man accused of robbery who insists on representing himself and uses the opportunity to cross-examine Mark, revealing that his father Victor Callan is a known grifter and criminal. Through a clever trick, however, Mark convinces the jury that his opponent is guilty. Emily meets Luke, a bailiff training to be a lawyer, but having already been through an abusive relationship, she decides she is not ready for a new one with him. Lola tells Daphne that she knows her mother was the real culprit and made her take the fall by threatening to abandon her and her unborn baby; she encourages her to leave and start her own life.
2	2	"Long Day's Journey into ICE"	Michael M. Robin	Gregory Nelson	September 30, 2019	T13.22102	5.66
An ICE agent illegally enters Lola's courtroom to arrest a defendant, sparking a confrontation between the courthouse and the federal government over California's status as a sanctuary for undocumented immigrants. Mark discovers that the father of a young woman he's prosecuting paid a witness to lie on the stand, which puts him into conflict with defense attorney Amy Quinn. Realizing this, Lola points out that Mark always had "a thing" for Amy, annoying him. Aware of the pressure of having to protect a criminally inclined parent, he persuades the girl to testify against her father, getting him sentenced to two years with the help of his superior, DA Thomas Choi. Emily prepares to enter a guilty plea on her client's behalf that would result in a four-year sentence and strip him of his right to asylum, but Lola refuses to accept it. Instead, she finds a loophole that allows the defendant to instead be charged with a misdemeanor, ensuring that he will only have to serve three months and protecting him from deportation. Later that night, Mark gives Lola a housewarming gift: a framed photo of her childhood hero, Nyota Uhura.
3	3	"Sweet Bird of Truth"	Anthony Hemingway	Sunil Nayar & Iturri Sosa	October 7, 2019	T13.22103	5.27
An unusual case is presented to Lola: a gamer, Janny Cartwright, accusing her friend of hacking into the popular online game Skyrise and "murdering" her avatar Errk. To facilitate her testimony, Lola allows Cartwright to testify while in character as Errk, leading to the prosecution threatening to file a complaint against her for incompetence. Recognizing that the case is civil, not criminal, in nature, Lola persuades both sides to agree to a settlement, in which no jail time will be served. Against Choi's wishes, Mark chooses to file charges in a racially-charged incident for which there is no clear proof and the victim refuses to testify. Faced with near-certain defeat, he wins only by submitting evidence proving that the man intended to commit violence. While jogging to work, Luke is mistaken for a vandal and arrested by one of his fellow deputies, Murphy, who eventually lets him go free but refuses to admit his mistake. At an evening gala to receive a medal for heroic actions, Luke confronts Murphy in uniform and tells him off before the ceremony. Emily accepts Luke's invitation to have dinner with him at a nearby diner.
4	4	"A View from the Bus"	Bronwen Hughes	Aaron Carter	October 14, 2019	T13.22104	5.03
Emily obtains permission from Lola to execute a "jury view" so that the jurors can experience a recreation of the crime scene involving her client, Dylan Frank, accused of taking part in a shooting. The trip initially goes well, but when police report an active shooter in the area, the court is forced to take shelter. This causes Lola to fear that her decision will lead to a biased verdict, and she insists on personally meeting with each of the jurors individually before deciding whom to strike. Mark is prosecuting a powerful heroin kingpin; his entire case is based on video footage provided by Det. Leyland. Warned by Lola, Mark takes a closer look at Leyland's evidence and quickly realizes that the warrant she used to obtain it was based on a CI's false testimony. Despite his misgivings about challenging the police, he informs Choi, who calls in the police chief and gets him to have Leyland investigated. Mark is forced to dismiss the charges, but Choi congratulates him, noting that the business of prosecutors is to get justice, not convictions. In spite of Lola's fears, the jury finds Dylan not guilty. Luke decides that he will train to be a public defender like Emily.
5	5	"Devotees in the Courthouse of Love"	Michael M. Robin	Shernold Edwards	October 21, 2019	T13.22105	5.44
The courthouse prepares for Marriage Day, an annual tradition in which anyone can get married free of charge. Lola is stunned to learn that her latest defendant will be charged hefty court fees, so she works out a plan for him to serve a few hours in jail instead. Emily's client, a Catholic nun (Emma Dumont), falsely confesses to stealing from her church; Emily determines that she did so in order to protect her mentor, the church's accountant, who stole the money in a dispute over how it was to be spent. Emily arranges for the stolen funds to be returned, and Lola sentences her client to community service. Mark is prosecuting a woman who is a serial dine-and-dasher. Amy Quinn is her lawyer and beats Mark in court by using dirty tactics. Amy surprises him afterwards by informing her guilty client that she will not be representing her in the future. They agree to have dinner together when possible. Luke helps Emily remove her engagement ring so she can return it to her former mother-in-law. Judge Benner arrives to officiate the weddings, despite confiding to Lola that her partner dumped her earlier that day.
6	6	"Fool for Liv"	Stacey K. Black	Conway Preston	October 28, 2019	T13.22106	5.49
A celebrity trial pits Lola against Adam Pryce, a lawyer willing to use every trick in the book to win: submitting illegal evidence, making prejudicial statements, intimidating the jury, and even going after the judge herself, resulting in a highly charged atmosphere where Lola and her court must find a way to ensure the fairness of the proceedings. Emily tries to get Mark to sign off on a more favorable deal to her client, who belongs to a family of criminals; after a difficult conversation about how they both know what it's like to have family issues, Mark agrees. After being forced to stay with Sherri for the night when her home address is posted online, Lola has had enough and orders a formal complaint written up against Pryce, threatening him with potential disbarment to keep him in line. Choi then delivers a powerful cross-examination of the defendant, forcing her to incriminate herself and sealing her fate. Lola is disgusted to find that Pryce does not even care that he lost, only that he was outmaneuvered. While helping Luke prepare for his exams, Emily gives into her feelings and kisses him.
7	7	"Uncommon Women and Mothers"	Paul McCrane	Sunil Nayar	November 4, 2019	T13.22107	5.11
A minor earthquake strikes the courthouse. Lola discovers her social activist mother, Roxy, is testifying on behalf of Jax, a non binary homeless youth who uses they/them pronouns and is accused of arson. Mark is prosecuting the case and hammers Roxy with questions implying Jax's guilt, leading to Roxy being found in contempt of court for refusing to answer. Only when Lola tells Roxy to have faith in the system does she agree to finish her testimony. Emily tells Luke that while she kissed him, she does not want to pursue their relationship any further for now. Sherri and Sara compete with each other for the chance to be named the building's new earthquake safety warden. Lola refuses to sign off on a warrant over Fourth Amendment concerns, but Benner overrules her and signs it; Lola angrily confronts her but recognizes that she does not have the same experience and foresight as her mentor. Jax is found guilty but only on a minor charge with no prison time. Encouraged by Roxy, Mark has a drink with his father. Luke tells Emily that she needs to decide what she wants. Benner assigns Lola to be the safety warden.
8	8	"Maricela and the Desert"	Sheelin Choksey	Mellori Velasquez	November 18, 2019	T13.22108	5.33
Luke shadows Mark for the day as he travels to Las Vegas to pick up a witness arrested for assaulting an officer. After beating a judge in a game of pai gow, Mark gets the witness released and brings him back in time to testify. Lola's latest defendant, Felix Flores, is accused of murdering his wife Linda despite no body having been found. Among the witnesses is his eleven-year old daughter Maricela, whose unwillingness to put her father in prison results in Emily and Lola crossing swords as the latter goes above and beyond to avoid breaking up their family. Following state guidelines, Lola modifies her courtroom to make Maricela comfortable so she can testify. Emily spots an inconsistency in the testimony of another witness, Linda's best friend, and has the police look into it. A search of the witness' house reveals the truth: Linda, a recovering addict, had an overdose and was buried by her friend in secret to hide her own habit. Felix and Maricela are reunited, and Emily goes to apologize to Lola, who is annoyed by her lack of respect but concurs she would have done the same as a lawyer.
9	9	"How to Succeed in Law Without Really Re-trying"	Cheryl Dunye	Gregory Nelson	November 25, 2019	T13.22109	5.12
Lola's old nemesis, Felice Bell (Ever Carradine), announces she is appealing one of Lola's biggest cases while she was at the district attorney's office: putting an alt-right sympathizer in jail for a bombing that killed a young woman. As Mark's case for the appeal begins to fall apart due to gaps in the evidence, and Lola confronts Felice about intimidating her, she begins to wonder if she put an innocent man behind bars. However, Mark is able to convince one of the original witnesses to bring forward new evidence, leading to the appeal being curbed. Emily defends a former prisoner accused of conspiring to kill the judge who sentenced him. However, his theatrics cause Emily to attempt to create doubt by suggesting he may be incompetent — which puts her in a difficult position when she discovers he is faking it. After some advice from Luke, she gets him to enter a guilty plea by threatening to quit. Emily and Sara decide to become roommates since Emily is unable to find an apartment of her own.
10	10	"Dripsy"	Patricia Cardoso	Sunil Nayar & Aaron Carter	December 9, 2019	T13.22110	5.30
Lola suspends a carjacker's sentence when he expresses remorse. The courtroom is shut down for an asbestos check, so Lola, Sara, and Luke are transferred to a different room to try Carissa Shaw, who is facing a potential third strike for a stickup. Lola becomes concerned that the defendant's attorney, Fisk, is too inexperienced to handle the defense and removes him; Emily is appointed in his place even though Carissa blames her for mishandling her defense when she was first charged. Mark witnesses his father being arrested and learns he is being charged with murder. A therapist working with him on a different case helps open his eyes to his lack of sympathy, and he contemplates leaving the DA's office to help organize Vic's defense. Emily demonstrates her professionalism by defending Carissa to the best of her abilities, and wins the case. Lola is informed that the man she spared stole a car and died trying to escape from the police, leaving her wracked with guilt. Judge Benner then tells her that a complaint accusing her of bias has been filed by several of her former colleagues.
11	11	"The Joy from Oz"	Claudia Yarmy	Conway Preston	December 16, 2019	T13.22111	5.54
Lola's hearing sees her squaring off against Judge Jonas "The Punisher" Laski, who openly intervenes on behalf of her accusers by demanding Lola offer a credible rational for favoring defendants. Mark hires Amy Quinn to represent his father and meets with Liam, a mob captain prepared to turn on his boss, Trevor Mabbit. Liam refuses to explain why until Mark forces him to, revealing that it was Mabbit's heroin that killed his sister. Mark sympathizes, and tells Amy that he intends to stay involved with Vic's case. For Family Day, Judge Benner organizes a mock trial based on The Wizard of Oz, with Emily prosecuting Dorothy (played by Sara) while DA Choi defends her and Luke acts as the judge. Emily's annoyance at Choi for Lola's predicament, however, nearly derails the whole event. The commissioners ultimately decide the complaint is baseless and dismiss it. Lola appears in court as the Good Witch and sets Dorothy free. Laski asks her to meet with him, admitting that he tilted the process in part because he wanted to hear her justify her actions. He also warns her to beware of Judge Benner, hinting at a dark past.
12	12	"What the Constitution Greens to Me"	Steve Robin	Shernold Edwards & James Rogers III	January 6, 2020	T13.22112	5.96
Lola accepts an invitation from her colleague Albert Campbell to attend an annual charity gala. Benner gets her assigned to handle the case of Jeremy Moore, whose estranged mother, congresswoman Valerie Moore, exerts pressure on Lola to clear her son after Emily succeeds in getting a bench trial approved. Mark has to prosecute a doctor accused of racially motivated malpractice that led to a black woman, Joy Allen, dying of complications from childbirth. He and Joy's husband, Niles, mount a vigorous effort to sway the jury to their side; Campbell, who is presiding, asks Lola for her perspective as he cannot comprehend how race has anything to do with Joy's death. A witness in Jeremy's trial lies under oath, claiming he planned the crime in advance. Emily forces him and his mother to reveal the truth: the witness blackmailed Jeremy by threatening to publicize Valerie's bipolar disorder. This information enables Lola to have the witness arrested and give Jeremy a lighter sentence. Mark loses the case but makes up for it by arranging for Niles to give a press conference addressing medical discrimination against black mothers.
13	13	"What the Bailiff Saw"	Scott Ellis	Gregory Nelson	January 20, 2020	T13.22113	5.81
Emily is forced to defend a young gang member facing a charge of murder, but her attempt to get him immunity in exchange for the names of his gang's leaders fails when the prosecution bugs the room and tries to get the recordings admitted as evidence. Lola must decide whether to exclude the recordings, potentially antagonizing the cops and lawyers she works with, or admit them and condemn Emily's client in a case where it's uncertain if he is truly guilty. Amy informs Mark that she has the means to clear Vic's name, but having already lost faith in his father, Mark feels that he should be convicted anyway. Lola's husband, Robin, tells her he's been offered a promotion that will keep him in D.C. for the foreseeable future. Mark reconciles with Vic, deciding that while he still hates him for his negligence as a parent, that does not change the fact that he's innocent. Lola admits the recordings but successfully pressures the prosecution to offer Emily a deal giving her client immunity if he testifies against his gang. Sherri agrees to go on a date with a detective who has been pursuing her for some time.
14	14	"Bye Bye Bernie"	Michael M. Robin	Mellori Velasquez	February 3, 2020	T13.22114	5.50
Roxy makes a public statement attacking the judicial system, which opens a rift between her and Lola when she refuses to apologize. Emily cannot shake a feeling of distrust towards her newest client, Izzy Ruiz; Izzy is also hostile and argues with Emily, saying she does not understand what it is like to be seen as a criminal. Sara starts a betting pool for which clerkship offer Luke will accept. Mark works with an elderly widow, Bernie, to prepare for the trial of the man who mugged her. The two befriend each other, and Bernie urges Mark to make peace with Vic, who will soon be freed because of Amy's work. Emily wins her case when a witness confesses on the stand that Izzy did not commit murder, and consoles her client over the guilt she feels for her crime. Mark goes to see Bernie one last time, but her son tells him she died in her sleep. He takes Vic to the bus station, and then decides to tell Amy that he likes her and just as he is about to, Amy makes the first move and they spend the night together. Luke accepts an offer to clerk in the DA's office. Despite their raw feelings, Roxy and Lola have dinner together. Judge Benner informs Lola she's running for State Attorney General.
15	15	"Prelude to a Fish"	Steve Robin	Aaron Carter	February 10, 2020	T13.22115	5.66
Asked to conduct research for Judge Benner's campaign, Lola digs up an old case involving a private firm she worked for years ago, which allegedly engaged in unethical practices. Despite her feelings of loyalty to Benner, Lola chooses not to tell her about the case. Emily becomes emotionally involved with a client named Laura when her ex releases naked photos of her; Emily is able to use them to get a guilty plea, but not before Laura loses her job. Mark picks Luke to work with him on a case where a disabled man claims his health aide stole money from him; the man's lawyer is Amy Quinn. Mark and Amy agree to keep things professional, so Amy goes on a date with a different man. Luke and his fellow clerk Sam determine that the man committed Social Security fraud, and Mark settles the case, dropping the charges while offering to help the "victim" keep his disability benefits. Emily talks to Laura about how she also escaped an abusive relationship, and agrees to accompany her when she reports her ex's actions to the police. Luke gifts Emily a fish, and even though it brings up bad memories of her marriage, she accepts it. After the prelim, Amy meets Mark in his office and kisses him. He asks her if she would like to date and she says yes, so they start dating for real.
16	16	"My Fair Lockdown"	David Harp	Conway Preston	February 17, 2020	T13.22116	5.37
The courthouse goes into lockdown when a defendant, Ephraim Bowles (Ben Browder), steals a bailiff's gun and takes Lola, Choi, Emily, and the jury hostage. Mark and Luke are forced to shelter in place with Judge Laski after Luke violates court rules by speaking out of turn, earning a reprimand. Mark correctly deduces that Luke's outburst is tied to his feeling that he and Emily are drifting apart; Laski advises Luke to either start listening to Emily or end things. Lola convinces Bowles to release the jury members, but he then threatens to shoot Choi; Emily intervenes to save him. Judge Benner is locked in her office with Jean Frost, an old acquaintance who had previously spoken with Lola about her case. Frost tears into Benner, accusing her of being heartless, to which Benner confesses that she leaked documents her firm tried to hide, an offense that could get her disbarred. Ephraim contemplates suicide before his estranged daughter sends a video message urging him to surrender, which he does. Everyone is reunited with their loved ones, and Lola catches Benner and Frost embracing each other.
17	17	"I Love You, You're Perfect, I Think"	Paul McCrane	Gregory Nelson	March 9, 2020	T13.22117	4.62
Lola presents her findings to Judge Benner, which leads to an argument as Benner insists that an ethical violation is nothing compared to all the good work she intends to do as Attorney General. Mark makes an unexpected discovery: a burglary suspect may be responsible for a murder he prosecuted eight years ago in which an innocent man was convicted. He ignores Choi's orders to turn the case over to the Conviction Review Unit and has the man arrested, and Choi angrily suspends him. Emily finds herself hastily assigned to several new cases, including that of a veteran who she deduces is suffering from untreated PTSD. Her motion to have the charges dropped is denied by Lola, who asks instead for a deal in which her client will receive treatment while serving a one-year sentence. The experience brings her and Luke (sitting second chair in the trial) closer together than they've been in weeks. Sara forces Judge Campbell to acknowledge a mistake he made and wins his respect for standing up for herself. Judge Benner tells Lola she was wrong for challenging her, and will drop out of the race immediately.
18	18	"The Tale of Three Arraignments"	Claudia Yarmy	Denitria Harris-Lawrence	March 16, 2020	T13.22118	5.80
Lola is selected by Judge Benner to handle arraignments for the day, while Mark is penalized for his conduct with an assignment in the Case Review Unit. Lola runs into her old classmate Rachel, who is opening her own firm and wants to take Lola and Mark on as partners. Emily determines that her client Pamela, a prostitute, is being made to take the fall for her pimp. She and DDA Palmer have him arrested and cut a deal with his lawyer, Rachel, to get him to flip on his boss. Emily also gets Pamela help starting a new life. Robin suddenly returns home with news that he may be getting a job in L.A., to his wife's surprise. Mark contemplates the benefits of joining a private firm but decides that he can put the decision off while he resumes his normal job. Amy, however, accepts Rachel's offer. Luke questions whether Emily truly loves him, and she explains that her failed marriage has warped her understanding of what love is. Luke tells her they'll find a way to work past that. Lola receives an unexpected visit from David Sanders, Judge Benner's former campaign manager, who encourages her to consider a run for Attorney General.
19	19	"In the Fights"	Stacey K. Black	Mellori Velasquez	April 6, 2020	T13.22119	6.07
Lola anxiously awaits news from Robin of whether he will be transferring to Los Angeles. Emily defends a young man, Aiden, charged with felony domestic violence, while Mark, as prosecutor, works with the defendant's girlfriend Molly. Emily becomes personally affected by the case, and allows the pressure to build up until she has a full-blown panic attack in Judge Benner's courtroom. Amy and Samantha find themselves facing off in Lola's courtroom, where Lola's reprimand of Amy for her theatrics lands Mark in a difficult position in their relationship as Amy is mad that he treats their relationship far too casually. Sherri steps outside of her comfort zone by going on a lunch date with Detective Harris and ends up getting drunk, which Lola finds amusing. Lola eventually learns that Robin did not get the job in Los Angeles. Mark meets with Amy, and they have sex after he tells her that from now on, he's going to respect her boundaries. Emily gets herself removed from Aiden's case and goes home, where she breaks down and starts crying hysterically until Sara calms her. The next day, she has a peaceful breakfast with Luke.
20	20	"Merrily We Ride Along"	Cheryl Dunye	Gregory Nelson & Aaron Carter	April 13, 2020	T13.22120	5.95
Lola deals with the growing rift between her and Robin, as well as Roxy's depression over being forced out of her work at a non-profit organization. She gains some insight into her problems after learning that her first defendant, Daphne Rivas, has changed her life for the better and is applying for a job at the courthouse. Emily defends a woman charged with murder, who admits that she is a severe alcoholic with frequent blackouts. Emily believes from reading her file that she was coerced by the police to confess, and is successful in getting the charges dismissed. Lola notices Emily's struggles with her mental health, and suggests she seek help with a therapist she knows. While on a ride-along with a police officer, Mark witnesses the officer being attacked by a man he claims went for his gun. But when he is called to testify on the officer's behalf, Mark believes that he may have witnessed an episode of police brutality. Although the man is ultimately charged with a lesser crime, he begins to ponder whether being a DDA is right for him. Sara worries about her relationship with Ben, while Sherri hits a road bump in her relationship with Detective Harris.
21	21	"Dancing at Los Angeles"	Michael M. Robin	Greg Spottiswood & Gregory Nelson	May 4, 2020	T13.22121	5.09
In response to the COVID-19 pandemic, Judge Benner confers with her fellow judges and accepts Lola's proposal to hold Los Angeles' first virtual bench trial as a test run to restore the shuttered judicial system. Lola's case involves two brothers, Kurt and Joey Beto; Joey says his brother assaulted him and stole his car. Mark is surprised to learn that he is appearing before Lola for the first time, and the two agree to keep things professional. Luke decides to visit the local jail to help out, but Emily and Choi plead with him to reconsider and he agrees to instead recruit Sam to help find housing and accommodations for newly-released inmates. The virtual trial initially goes well but quickly devolves into a complete disaster when everyone starts arguing over each other. Kurt becomes disheartened and demands his right to a jury trial, forcing Lola into a difficult position. She convinces the brothers to reconcile, and Emily and Mark are able to work out a plea deal so Kurt can be released early. Emily and Luke have a virtual date, Mark and Amy discuss moving in with each other until the pandemic subsides, and Sara invites everyone, including the judges, to attend a virtual house party being hosted by local DJ Tailwind Turner.

=== Season 2 (2020–21) ===
No. overall	No. in season	Title	Directed by	Written by	Original release date	Prod. code	U.S. viewers (millions)
22	1	"A Change Is Gonna Come"	Michael M. Robin	Denitria Harris-Lawrence	November 16, 2020	T13.22801	4.24
23	2	"Keep Ya Head Up"	Erica Watson	Kimberly Ann Harrison	November 23, 2020	T13.22802	4.10
24	3	"Sliding Floors"	Pete Chatmon	Damani Johnson	November 30, 2020	T13.22803	4.25
25	4	"Bad Beat"	Paul McCrane	Gregory Nelson	December 7, 2020	T13.22804	4.22
26	5	"The Perils of the Plea"	Stacey K. Black	Briana Belser	December 14, 2020	T13.22805	4.13
27	6	"Bounceback"	Michael M. Robin	Greg Spottiswood	January 4, 2021	T13.22806	4.73
28	7	"Almost the Meteor"	David Harp	Aaron Carter	January 25, 2021	T13.22807	4.24
29	8	"Bette Davis Eyes"	Cheryl Dunye	Felicia Hilario	February 8, 2021	T13.22808	4.05
30	9	"Safe to Fall"	Bethany Rooney	Lucy Luna	February 22, 2021	T13.22809	4.14
31	10	"Georgia"	Scott Ellis	Annie Brunner	March 15, 2021	T13.22810	4.16
32	11	"Forgive Us Our Trespasses"	Paul McCrane	Kimberly Ann Harrison & Nicole Feste	April 12, 2021	T13.22811	3.86
33	12	"Chasing Waterfalls"	Mo McRae	Damani Johnson	April 19, 2021	T13.22812	3.22
34	13	"Love's Illusions"	Claudia Yarmy	Briana Belser	April 26, 2021	T13.22813	3.53
Lola returns to work after maternity leave. Choi is prosecuting a swatting case and asks Samantha to be his second chair. Emily confesses to Joaquin she kissed Luke. Mark and Luke have secret meetings where they ask police staff about Sheriff Wayne McCarthy, a suspect for corruption. Marnie Forstall is defended by Amy. She tells Amy she swatted her ex's gamertag GrayArea54 because he had nudes of her and was blackmailing her for more. Lola is invited to a Hamilton Club event. After Rachel figures out GrayArea54 is Norman Heines, the swatting victim, she gives Amy the info. She recalls Norman and questions him about this and the deletion of his gamer account. Marnie's parents become enraged at Norman but are kept separate by court officers. Luke meets with Lee Lori and the latter says he signed a statement for McCarthy when fresh out of the academy. Sara tutors a child named Nikki. They later have a videochat before being interrupted by Whitney, who yells degrading words at her daughter, followed by an offscreen thud. Sara visits Benner and voices her concern for Nikki's safety, but she is dismissive. Lola rules Marnie guilty of misdemeanor swatting. She gives a short speech stating COVID was hard without any hugs. Choi is pleased with Samantha and offers her first chair in the prosecution of Norman. Sara gives a report about her suspicions. Amy asks to become an equal partner in Audubon and Associates, due to Rachel kissing Mark.
35	14	"Caught Up in Circles"	Ramaa Mosley	Aaron Carter & Michael Slefinger	May 3, 2021	T13.22814	3.63
36	15	"Hear My Voice"	Michael M. Robin	Felicia Hilario & Annie Brunner	May 10, 2021	T13.22815	3.63
37	16	"Leap of Faith"	Denitria Harris-Lawrence	Lucy Luna & Denitria Harris-Lawrence	May 17, 2021	T13.22816	3.82
38	17	"Yeet"	Pete Chatmon	Kimberly Ann Harrison & Briana Belser	May 24, 2021	T13.22817	3.30

=== Season 3 (2022–23) ===
No. overall	No. in season	Title	Directed by	Written by	Original release date	Prod. code	U.S. viewers (millions)
Part 1
39	1	"Wanna Be Startin' Somethin'"	Michael M. Robin	Denitria Harris-Lawrence	June 7, 2022	T13.23651	0.32
40	2	"The Game"	Marie Jamora	Gina Gold & Aurorae Khoo	June 14, 2022	T13.23652	0.32
41	3	"Give It Time"	Lionel Coleman	Lucy Luna	June 21, 2022	T13.23653	0.28
42	4	"Trouble Man"	Rob Greenlea	Corey Moore	June 28, 2022	T13.23654	0.30
43	5	"It Ain't Over Till It's Over"	Paul McCrane	Katrina O'Gilvie	July 5, 2022	T13.23655	0.27
44	6	"I'll Be There"	Neema Barnette	Annie Brunner	July 12, 2022	T13.23656	0.28
45	7	"Through the Fire"	Mo McRae	Dylan Park-Pettiford	July 19, 2022	T13.23657	0.33
46	8	"Lola Through the Looking Glass"	David Harp	Deborah Swisher & Marty Scott	July 26, 2022	T13.23658	0.30
47	9	"Truth Hurts"	Wilson Bethel	Nicole Feste	August 2, 2022	T13.23659	0.34
48	10	"Fire and Rain"	Denitria Harris-Lawrence	Denitria Harris-Lawrence	August 9, 2022	T13.23660	0.35
On his friend Leo Sykes' online orders, Page's followers storm the HOJ, forcing a lockdown, trashing Courtroom 802, and forcing Lola and Andre to sequester in her chambers, where they confront their shared past in full. Ness' joy in passing the bar is cut short when Sykes stabs her in a stairwell, leaving her bleeding heavily. Luke squares off with him in defense of Emily but is wounded by a gunshot before she takes control using Sykes' own gun until deputies arrive. Mark and Robin make up and Mark turns Page over to the U.S. Attorney after Sykes decides to become a witness following his arrest. Ness is found by Amy and brought to a hospital. Luke and Emily whisper their love for each other before Luke is taken for medical attention. Teddy is also shot during the melee and may be wounded more gravely. As the lockdown ends, Andre apologizes to Lola for leaving her two decades earlier and they share an impulsive kiss, which is seen by a shocked Robin.
Part 2
49	11	"Unwanted Guest"	Mo McRae	Gina Gold & Aurorae Khoo	September 16, 2023	T13.23661	0.27
50	12	"Guilt Is a Bully"	Martina Lee	Lucy Luna	September 23, 2023	T13.23662	0.20
51	13	"Trouble Woman"	Jackie Tejada	Corey Moore	September 30, 2023	T13.23663	0.23
52	14	"We Are Family"	Jes Macallan	Katrina O'Gilvie	October 7, 2023	T13.23664	0.28
53	15	"Say Something"	Neema Barnette	Annie Brunner	October 14, 2023	T13.23665	0.30
54	16	"Passionfruit"	Dantonio Alvarez	Dylan Park-Pettiford	October 21, 2023	T13.23666	0.24
55	17	"I Will Not Go Quietly"	Maryam Keshavarz	Deborah Swisher & Marty Scott	October 28, 2023	T13.23667	0.20
56	18	"Pretty Ugly"	Lou Diamond Phillips	Gina Gold & Aurorae Khoo	November 4, 2023	T13.23668	0.29
57	19	"Come Hell or High Water"	Nijla Mu'min	Lucy Luna & Corey Moore	November 11, 2023	T13.23669	0.25
58	20	"Sometimes Truth Is Stranger Than Fiction"	Denitria Harris-Lawrence	Heyward Thomas & Denitria Harris-Lawrence	November 18, 2023	T13.23670	0.27

== Production ==
=== Development ===
On January 31, 2019, it was announced that CBS had given the production, then titled Courthouse, a pilot order. The pilot was written by Greg Spottiswood, who also served as an executive producer. Production companies involved with the pilot included Warner Bros. Television.

On May 9, 2019, it was announced that CBS had given the production, now titled All Rise, a series order. A day later, it was announced that the series would premiere during the 2019 U.S. fall TV season and air on Mondays at 9:00 p.m. A trailer for the series was released on May 15, 2019. The series debuted on September 23, 2019.

On October 22, 2019, the series received a full season order. On December 5, Dee Harris-Lawrence was announced to be replacing Sunil Nayar as a co-showrunner; she would be working alongside series developer Greg Spottiswood.

On April 6, 2020, it was announced that, amid the COVID-19 pandemic, an all-virtual episode would be produced about how the characters on the show handle a case while social distancing. The episode was filmed at the actors' respective homes using FaceTime, WebEx, and Zoom, and visual effects were used to replace the insides of their homes with that of their characters' homes.

On May 6, 2020, CBS renewed the series for a second season, which premiered on November 16, 2020. On May 15, 2021, CBS canceled the series after two seasons. On August 20, 2021, it was reported that OWN was negotiating with Warner Bros. Television for a potential third season. On September 29, 2021, OWN officially picked up the series for a third season, consisting of 20 episodes, which premiered on June 7, 2022. On August 22, 2023, it was announced that the third season would be its last. The series finale aired on November 18, 2023.

=== Controversy ===
On August 20, 2020, it was reported that five writers left the series after clashing with the series's showrunner, Greg Spottiswood, over how race – specifically people of color – and gender were depicted. After complaints from staff members about Spottiswood's leadership, the human resources department of Warner Bros. Television Studios reviewed the series's workplace and "decided to keep him as the showrunner" but hired an African American female corporate coach to guide him. On March 24, 2021, Warner Bros. Television fired Spottiswood from the series due to the misconduct allegations.

=== Casting ===
In February 2019, it was announced that Simone Missick had been cast in the pilot's lead role. The next month, it was reported that J. Alex Brinson, Lindsay Mendez, Marg Helgenberger, Ruthie Ann Miles, Jessica Camacho and Wilson Bethel had joined the cast. On August 20, 2019, Reggie Lee and Nadia Gray were cast in recurring roles. On September 10, 2019, it was reported that Mitch Silpa had been cast in a recurring capacity. On August 4, 2020, Lindsey Gort was promoted to a series regular for the second season. On September 29, 2020, Audrey Corsa was promoted to a series regular for the second season. On October 21, 2020, Reggie Lee was promoted to a series regular for the second season. On November 30, 2020, Anne Heche was cast in a recurring role for the second season. On February 9, 2022, Roger Guenveur Smith and Christian Keyes were cast in recurring roles for the third season; Keyes' role was originally played by Todd Williams.

== Reception ==
=== Critical response ===
The review aggregator website Rotten Tomatoes reported a 56% approval rating with an average rating of 5.98/10, based on 16 reviews. The website's critical consensus states, "While All Rise can't quite rise above the shows it aspires to be, it shows potential for future growth while providing a decent showcase for Simone Missick." On Metacritic, it has a weighted average score of 62 out of 100, based on 10 critics, indicating "generally favorable reviews".

=== Ratings ===
Viewership and ratings per season of All Rise
Season	Timeslot (ET)	Network	Episodes	First aired		Last aired		TV season	Viewership rank	Avg. viewers (millions)
Season	Timeslot (ET)	Network	Episodes	Date	Viewers (millions)	Date	Viewers (millions)	TV season	Viewership rank	Avg. viewers (millions)
1	Monday 9:00 p.m.	CBS	21	September 23, 2019	6.03	May 4, 2020	5.09	2019–20	41	7.64
2	Monday 9:00 p.m.	CBS	17	November 16, 2020	4.24	May 24, 2021	3.30	2020–21	46	5.69
3	Tuesday 8:00 p.m. (1–10); Saturday 9:00 p.m. (11–20)	OWN	20	June 7, 2022	0.32	November 18, 2023	0.27	2021–22	TBD	0.28

==== Season 1 ====
Viewership and ratings per episode of All Rise
No.	Title	Air date	Rating/share (18–49)	Viewers (millions)	DVR (18–49)	DVR viewers (millions)	Total (18–49)	Total viewers (millions)
1	"Pilot"	September 23, 2019	0.7/3	6.03	0.3	2.49	1.0	8.53
2	"Long Day's Journey into ICE"	September 30, 2019	0.6/3	5.66	0.4	2.36	1.0	8.02
3	"Sweet Bird of Truth"	October 7, 2019	0.6/3	5.27	0.3	2.20	0.9	7.48
4	"A View from the Bus"	October 14, 2019	0.6/3	5.03	—N/a	2.10	—N/a	7.14
5	"Devotees in the Courthouse of Love"	October 21, 2019	0.7/3	5.44	—N/a	2.03	—N/a	7.48
6	"Fool for Liv"	October 28, 2019	0.7/3	5.49	—N/a	2.13	—N/a	7.62
7	"Uncommon Women and Mothers"	November 4, 2019	0.6/3	5.11	—N/a	2.22	—N/a	7.33
8	"Maricela and the Desert"	November 18, 2019	0.6/3	5.33	—N/a	2.08	—N/a	7.41
9	"How to Succeed in Law Without Really Re-trying"	November 25, 2019	0.6/3	5.12	0.3	2.42	0.9	7.54
10	"Dripsy"	December 9, 2019	0.5/3	5.30	—N/a	2.14	—N/a	7.43
11	"The Joy from Oz"	December 16, 2019	0.7/3	5.54	0.3	2.02	1.0	7.56
12	"What the Constitution Greens to Me"	January 6, 2020	0.5/3	5.96	—N/a	2.23	—N/a	8.20
13	"What the Bailiff Saw"	January 20, 2020	0.6/3	5.81	—N/a	2.19	—N/a	8.00
14	"Bye Bye Bernie"	February 3, 2020	0.6	5.50	0.3	2.27	0.9	7.79
15	"Prelude to a Fish"	February 10, 2020	0.7	5.66	—N/a	2.03	—N/a	7.69
16	"My Fair Lockdown"	February 17, 2020	0.6	5.37	—N/a	2.03	—N/a	7.40
17	"I Love You, You're Perfect, I Think"	March 9, 2020	0.6	4.62	—N/a	2.38	—N/a	7.00
18	"The Tale of Three Arraignments"	March 16, 2020	0.7	5.80	—N/a	2.12	—N/a	7.92
19	"In the Fights"	April 6, 2020	0.7	6.07	0.3	1.95	1.0	8.02
20	"Merrily We Ride Along"	April 13, 2020	0.6	5.95	—N/a	2.06	—N/a	8.01
21	"Dancing at Los Angeles"	May 4, 2020	0.6	5.09	—N/a	1.82	—N/a	6.91

Throughout its first eight episodes, All Rise was the highest-rated freshman program of the 2019–20 television season. The series averaged 7 million viewers a week, in Nielsen's Live-plus-three day viewership.

==== Season 2 ====
Viewership and ratings per episode of All Rise
No.	Title	Air date	Rating (18–49)	Viewers (millions)	DVR (18–49)	DVR viewers (millions)	Total (18–49)	Total viewers (millions)
1	"A Change Is Gonna Come"	November 16, 2020	0.5	4.24	0.2	2.05	0.7	6.29
2	"Keep Ya Head Up"	November 23, 2020	0.5	4.10	—N/a	—N/a	—N/a	—N/a
3	"Sliding Floors"	November 30, 2020	0.5	4.25	0.2	1.84	0.7	6.09
4	"Bad Beat"	December 7, 2020	0.5	4.22	0.2	1.67	0.7	5.89
5	"The Perils of the Plea"	December 14, 2020	0.4	4.13	—N/a	—N/a	—N/a	—N/a
6	"Bounceback"	January 4, 2021	0.5	4.73	0.3	1.71	0.8	6.44
7	"Almost the Meteor"	January 25, 2021	0.5	4.24	—N/a	—N/a	—N/a	—N/a
8	"Bette Davis Eyes"	February 8, 2021	0.5	4.05	—N/a	2.02	—N/a	6.08
9	"Safe to Fall"	February 22, 2021	0.4	4.14	0.3	2.07	0.7	6.21
10	"Georgia"	March 15, 2021	0.4	4.16	—N/a	—N/a	—N/a	—N/a
11	"Forgive Us Our Trespasses"	April 12, 2021	0.4	3.86	0.2	1.62	0.6	5.48
12	"Chasing Waterfalls"	April 19, 2021	0.4	3.22	0.2	1.75	0.6	4.97
13	"Love's Illusions"	April 26, 2021	0.4	3.53	0.2	1.56	0.6	5.09
14	"Caught Up in Circles"	May 3, 2021	0.4	3.63	0.2	1.54	0.6	4.99
15	"Hear My Voice"	May 10, 2021	0.4	3.63	0.2	1.55	0.7	5.18
16	"Leap of Faith"	May 17, 2021	0.5	3.82	0.2	1.46	0.7	5.27
17	"Yeet"	May 24, 2021	0.4	3.30	0.2	1.40	0.6	4.70

==== Season 3 ====
Viewership and ratings per episode of All Rise
No.	Title	Air date	Rating (18–49)	Viewers (millions)	DVR (18–49)	DVR viewers (millions)	Total (18–49)	Total viewers (millions)
1	"Wanna Be Startin' Somethin'"	June 7, 2022	0.0	0.32	—N/a	—N/a	—N/a	—N/a
2	"The Game"	June 14, 2022	0.0	0.32	—N/a	—N/a	—N/a	—N/a
3	"Give It Time"	June 21, 2022	0.0	0.28	—N/a	—N/a	—N/a	—N/a
4	"Trouble Man"	June 28, 2022	0.0	0.30	—N/a	—N/a	—N/a	—N/a
5	"It Ain't Over Till It's Over"	July 5, 2022	0.0	0.27	—N/a	—N/a	—N/a	—N/a
6	"I'll Be There"	July 12, 2022	0.0	0.28	—N/a	—N/a	—N/a	—N/a
7	"Through the Fire"	July 19, 2022	0.0	0.33	—N/a	—N/a	—N/a	—N/a
8	"Lola Through the Looking Glass"	July 26, 2022	0.0	0.30	—N/a	—N/a	—N/a	—N/a
9	"Truth Hurts"	August 2, 2022	0.0	0.34	—N/a	—N/a	—N/a	—N/a
10	"Fire and Rain"	August 9, 2022	0.0	0.35	—N/a	—N/a	—N/a	—N/a
11	"Unwanted Guest"	September 16, 2023	0.0	0.27	—N/a	—N/a	—N/a	—N/a
12	"Guilt Is a Bully"	September 23, 2023	0.0	0.20	—N/a	—N/a	—N/a	—N/a
13	"Trouble Woman"	September 30, 2023	0.0	0.23	—N/a	—N/a	—N/a	—N/a
14	"We Are Family"	October 7, 2023	0.0	0.28	—N/a	—N/a	—N/a	—N/a
15	"Say Something"	October 14, 2023	0.1	0.30	—N/a	—N/a	—N/a	—N/a
16	"Passionfruit"	October 21, 2023	0.0	0.24	—N/a	—N/a	—N/a	—N/a
17	"I Will Not Go Quietly"	October 28, 2023	0.0	0.20	—N/a	—N/a	—N/a	—N/a
18	"Pretty Ugly"	November 4, 2023	0.0	0.29	—N/a	—N/a	—N/a	—N/a
19	"Come Hell or High Water"	November 11, 2023	0.0	0.25	—N/a	—N/a	—N/a	—N/a
20	"Sometimes Truth Is Stranger Than Fiction"	November 18, 2023	0.0	0.27	—N/a	—N/a	—N/a	—N/a

== Accolades ==
Association	Year	Work	Category	Result	Ref.
ASCAP Screen Music Awards	2020	Joey Newman	Top TV Series – Composer	Won	
Black Reel Awards	2020	All Rise	Outstanding Drama Series	Nominated	
Black Reel Awards	2020	Simone Missick	Outstanding Actress, Drama Series	Nominated	
Black Reel Awards	2020	L. Scott Caldwell	Outstanding Guest Actress, Drama Series	Nominated	
NAACP Image Awards	2020	Simone Missick	Outstanding Actress in a Drama Series	Nominated	
NAACP Image Awards	2021	Simone Missick	Outstanding Actress in a Drama Series	Nominated	
NAACP Image Awards	2021	All Rise	Outstanding Drama Series	Nominated	
Young Artist Awards	2020	Eva Ariel Binder	Best Guest Starring Young Actress	Nominated	
