= Underworld (1996 film) =

- Theatrical release poster
- Directed by: Roger Christian
- Written by: Larry Bishop
- Produced by: Robert Vince; William Vince
- Starring: Denis Leary; Joe Mantegna; Annabella Sciorra
- Cinematography: Steven Bernstein
- Edited by: Robin Russell
- Music by: Anthony Marinelli
- Production company: Keystone Entertainment
- Distributed by: Legacy Releasing
- Release dates: June 1996 (Mystfest); May 9, 1997 (US)
- Running time: 95 minutes
- Country: United States
- Language: English

Underworld is a 1996 neo-noir action comedy film directed by Roger Christian and starring Denis Leary, Joe Mantegna and Annabella Sciorra.

== Plot ==
Just out of prison, Johnny Crown (Denis Leary) is running late for a meeting he has been waiting seven years to attend. Before the meeting, he plans to find those responsible for his father's murder. Accompanied by his friend Frank Gavilan (Joe Mantegna), Johnny seeks to uncover who arranged the murder and to take revenge.

== Cast ==
- Denis Leary as Johnny Alt / Johnny Crown
- Joe Mantegna as Frank Gavilan / Frank Cassady / Richard Essex
- Annabella Sciorra as Dr. Leah
- Larry Bishop as Ned Lynch
- Abe Vigoda as Will Cassady
- Robert Costanzo as Stan
- Traci Lords as Anna
- Jimmie F. Skaggs as Phil "Smilin' Phil" Fox / Todd Streeb
- James Tolkan as Dan "Iceberg" Eagan
- Heidi Schanz as Joyce Alt
- Cristi Conaway as Julianne
- Angela Jones as Janette
- Michael David Simms as Mitch Reed
- Amy Moon as Ava
- Marc Baur as Leo

== Production ==
After Roger Christian directed the successful The Final Cut for producers Robert and William Vince of Keystone Entertainment, the Vinces presented Christian with the script for Underworld by Larry Bishop. Christian responded positively to the script which allegedly Quentin Tarantino had read and responded to positively a few years ago and inspired him to write Reservoir Dogs and the Vinces hired Christian to direct after being satisfied with his work on The Final Cut while they were trying to convince Denis Leary to sign on to lead as the financing was contingent upon his involvement in the film. Leary had issues with a final scene in the script until Christian described how he'd approach it which helped clear away Leary's reservations and seeing him agree to lead the film.

Principal photography on Underworld took place from November through December 1995. Trimark Pictures was initially set to distribute the film with chairman Mark Amin an executive producer on the film, but following disagreements between Keystone and Trimark over how to market the film, with Trimark favoring selling Underworld as an art film while Keystone wanted to play to a broader commercial audience, the two companies came to an agreement where Keystone would handle the theatrical release of the film themselves with input and advice from Trimark while Trimark would handle the home video distribution of the film. Keystone would eventually partner with Legacy Releasing on the film's theatrical release.

== Release ==
Underworld first premiered at the 1996 Cannes Film Festival in May of that year. The following June, the film played at Italy's Mystfest, where it was nominated for Best Film. It was also shown at the Austin Film Festival on October 10, 1996. The film was given a limited theatrical release in the United States by Legacy Releasing on May 9, 1997 in New York, Los Angeles, Boston, Chicago, Houston, San Francisco, Seattle and Washington, D.C.. The film's home video release followed on July 22, 1997 by Trimark Pictures.

== Reception ==
CNN reviewer Paul Tatara gave a highly negative review of the film, dubbing it as "...very violent, very profane, and very bad. There's less killing at your local slaughterhouse, and the dialogue is probably sharper." Anita Gates of The New York Times noted that the film with all its flaws was "Fine actors in the lead roles [struggling] to maintain their dignity and to breathe some believability into these characters, who all talk strangely alike, and to an admirable degree they succeed."
