= Forgotten Pills =

- Promotional poster
- Directed by: David Hefner
- Written by: David Hefner
- Produced by: Fiona Walsh
- Starring: Chris Blasman; Christina Murphy; Tye Alexander; Shane Callahan; Larry Bishop
- Cinematography: Pierluigi Malavasi
- Edited by: David Hefner
- Music by: Robert ToTeras
- Release date: June 5, 2010 (Dances With Films)
- Running time: 79 minutes
- Country: United States
- Language: English

Forgotten Pills is a 2010 American indie film written and directed by David Hefner. It stars Chris Blasman, Christina Murphy, Tye Alexander, Shane Callahan and Larry Bishop as the drug dealer Mathis.

The film is a feature-length version of an original short film of the same name. It was shot in Los Angeles, California in late 2007. The film was released on June 5, 2010, as an Official Selection for the 2010 Dances With Films festival in Los Angeles, where it was awarded the Grand Jury Award for Features.

== Plot ==
Patrick and his girlfriend Megan meet up with their childhood friends, Ryan and Sean. Ryan is a hothead who constantly torments Patrick, while Sean is more interested in flirting with Megan than catching up with friends. They have met again in order to experiment with new pills called “Blue and Whites” that cause instant amnesia at the stroke of midnight. Patrick is hesitant to partake, but he eventually gives in to peer pressure. The four friends meet a crazy, gun-wielding drug dealer at a local bar and proceed to take the pills. Patrick becomes increasingly upset with the actions of his friends during the evening, and the uncontrolled promiscuity of his girlfriend feeds his jealousy and paranoia. The animal desires and loose inner demons of the friends eventually take over what was intended to be a night devoid of consequence.

== Cast ==
- Chris Blasman as Patrick
- Christina Murphy as Megan
- Tyler Alexander as Ryan
- Shane Callahan as Sean
- Larry Bishop as Mathis
- Jessica Raskin as Cynthia
- Jesse Harley as Bus Bitch Dave
- Lindsey Gort as Alicia
- Dalton O'Dell as Patrick (age 10)
- Shane Carter Thomas as Ryan (age 10)
- Charlotte Barrielle as Megan (age 10)
- Richie Hicks as Sean (age 10)
- Masam Holden as Patrick (age 15)
- Jordan-Claire Green as Megan (age 15)
- Patrick McCaffery as Ryan (age 15)
- Zachariah Palmer as Sean (age 15)
- Jeremiah Graves as College Kid # 1
- Patrick Daley as College Kid # 2

== Production ==
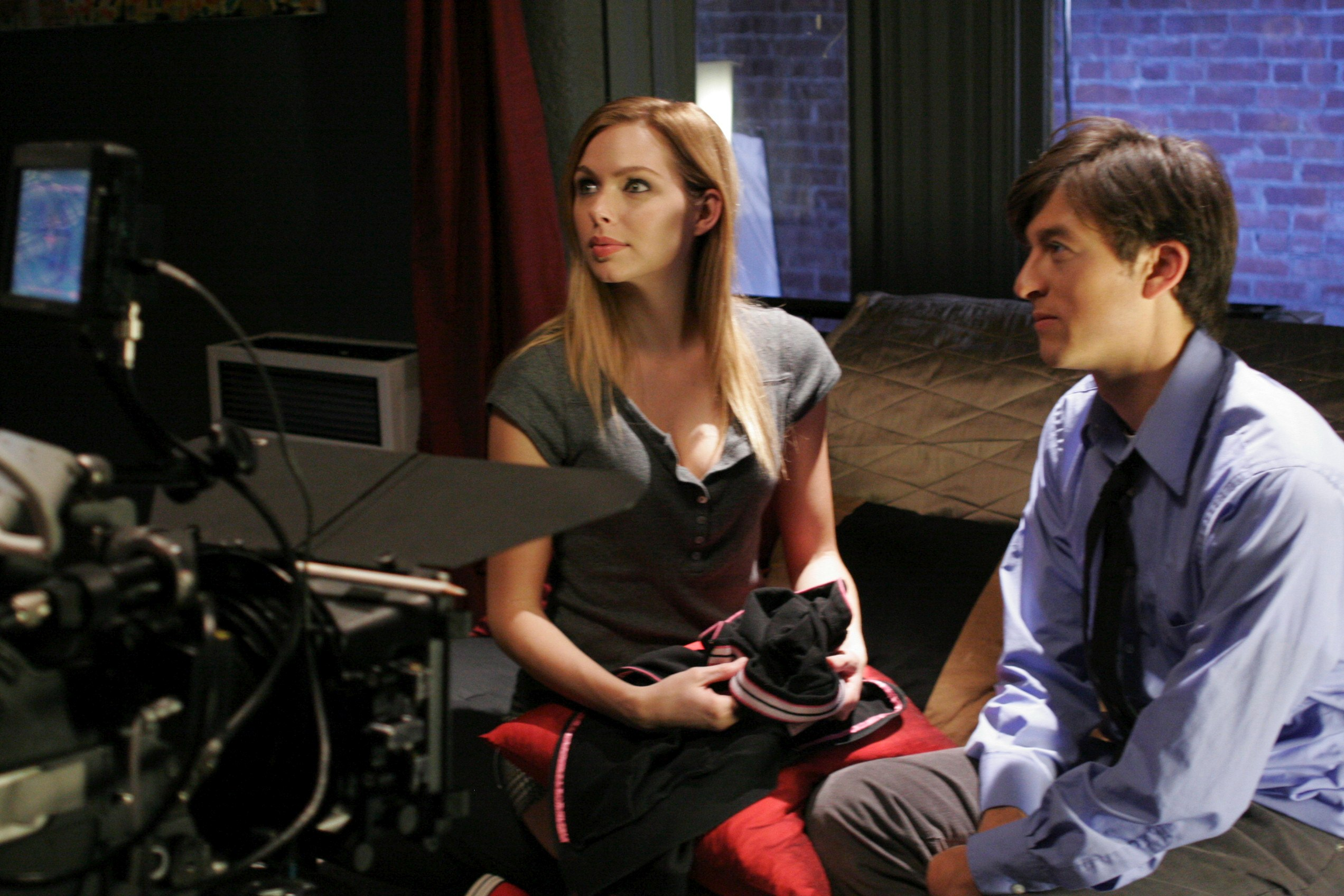
A behind the scenes shot of Christina Murphy and Chris Blasman.

Forgotten Pills was originally a 20-minute short film written, filmed and released in 2005. After its completion, writer/director David Hefner decided to expand the story into a full-length screenplay. In the press kit for full-length's release, David offers some insight on the creation of the story itself: "The idea for Forgotten Pills came to me one evening while I was lying in bed. I was still in college and my mind was full of 'what if?' scenarios. ...I began to wonder how people might behave if their actions had no consequences. This sparked the idea of a pill that grants a person some measure of immunity to guilt and the repercussions of their actions."

Shooting for the full-length film began in November 2007 in various locations in Los Angeles, California. Notably, Tye Alexander, who appeared in the first short film as Ryan, reprised his role in the feature. The film was shot over the course of 18 days on Super 16mm film. The apartment, which was the main location, proved to be the most difficult place to secure due to the length of the stay needed for shooting. Eventually, it was acquired for free by a friend of the Line Producer Fiona Walsh. The Green Frog, a bar in Van Nuys California, was used for the bar scenes in the film, and it also served as the location for the film's wrap party.

== Release ==
The film was released as part of the 2010 Dances With Films Festival on June 5, 2010. At the conclusion of the Dances With Films festival, Forgotten Pills was awarded the Grand Jury Award for Features.
