= Shane Callahan =

American film and television actor

- Born: Michael Shane Callahan; Titusville, Pennsylvania, U.S.
- Education: Art Institute of Pittsburgh
- Occupation: Actor
- Years active: 1989–present
- Spouse: Karen Labbe

Michael Shane Callahan is an American film and television actor. Callahan graduated from Titusville Area High School in 1992 and then went on to graduate from the Art Institute of Pittsburgh in 1995 with a video business degree and a music degree. He has had prominent roles in feature films such as Well Wishes as well as television series including Under the Dome and theatre productions such as True West. Callahan has also produced short films including Acito on the Mound.

== Filmography ==
=== Film ===
Year	Title	Role	Notes
2002	The Mothman Prophecies	Nat Griffin	
2003	Gods and Generals	Bowdoin Student	
2003	Vampires Anonymous	Tucker Sanders	
2003	Dog Nights	Van	
2004	Invisible Mountains	Paul	
2010	Forgotten Pills	Sean	
2012	Jack Reacher	SWAT Guy	
2013	Killing Lincoln	Lieutenant J.T. Bolton	
2013	Don't Know Yet	Creature	
2014	Million Dollar Arm	Procorp Agent #1	
2015	The Longest Ride	Buyer 3	
2015	The Last Witch Hunter	Hipster Man at Parlour	
2015	Well Wishes	Miles	
2016	Indiscretion	Neil	
2016	Allegiant	Trail Factionless Member #1	
2016	Term Life	Police Officer	
2018	The Terrible Two	Reggie	

=== Television ===
Year	Title	Role	Notes
1999	Dawson's Creek	James Lowell	Episode: "High Risk Behavior"
1999	Shake, Rattle and Roll: An American Love Story	Woody	Television film
2001	The New Detectives: Case Studies in Forensic Science	Michael Kinney	Episode: "Cold Blooded"
2006	The War That Made America	Matthew Smith	4 episodes
2007	The Kill Point	Roger Coombs	Episode: "Visiting Hours"
2010	One Tree Hill	Customer #2	Episode: "Lists, Plans"
2011	The Vampire Diaries	Liam	Episode: "The End of the Affair"
2012–2013	Revolution	Jimmy	5 episodes
2013	Army Wives	LT Higgins	Episode: "Hearth and Home"
2013	Drop Dead Diva	Kevin Jacobs	Episode: "Back From the Dead"
2014	Turn: Washington's Spies	Andre's Guard (Frederic)	Episode: "Epiphany"
2015	Under the Dome	Roger Lopez	4 episodes
2017	Outsiders	Barnabis McGintuk	10 episodes
2019	Reprisal	Bru	8 episodes
2021	Dopesick	Dr. Russell Portenoy	2 episodes
2022	American Horror Stories	Historian	Episode: "Bloody Mary"
