= Larry Bishop =

American actor

- Born: November 30, 1948 (age 77); Philadelphia, Pennsylvania, U.S.
- Occupations: Actor; screenwriter; film director
- Years active: 1966–present

Larry Bishop (born November 30, 1948) is an American actor, screenwriter and film director. He is the son of Sylvia Ruzga and comedian Joey Bishop. He has appeared in movies such as The Sting II, Underworld, and Kill Bill: Volume 2.

== Early life ==
Bishop attended Beverly Hills High School. His fellow alumni Rob Reiner and Richard Dreyfuss appear with him in Mad Dog Time, as does Joey Bishop.

== Career ==
His television credits include writing for (and appearances on) The Hollywood Palace (with then-partner Rob Reiner), and appearances on I Dream of Jeannie, Love, American Style, Barney Miller, Laverne & Shirley and Kung Fu.

His movie credits include roles in Kill Bill: Volume 2, The Big Fix, The Savage Seven, and as the hook-handed musician Abraham "The Hook" Salteen in Wild in the Streets. He wrote, directed and appeared in Mad Dog Time in 1996, reuniting him with Streets costar Christopher Jones in Jones' final film appearance. His most recent movies are 2008's Hell Ride, in collaboration with Quentin Tarantino, and 2010's Forgotten Pills.

== Filmography ==
=== Actor ===
- 1968: Wild in the Streets by Barry Shear: Abraham "The Hook" Salteen
- 1968: The Savage Seven by Richard Rush: "Joint"
- 1969: The Devil's 8 by Burt Topper: Chandler
- 1969: I Dream of Jeannie - Season 5, episode 14: Dick
- 1970: Angel Unchained by Lee Madden: Pilote
- 1971: Chrome and Hot Leather by Lee Frost: Gabe
- 1973: Love, American Style - Season 4, episode 20
- 1973: Kung Fu - Season 1, episode 12 : Major Trapnell
- 1973: The Third Girl from the Left (TV) by Peter Medak: Bradford
- 1973: Soul Hustler by Burt Topper: Brian
- 1974: Shanks by William Castle: Napoleon
- 1975: How Come Nobody's on Our Side? by Richard Michaels: Brandy
- 1975: All Together Now (TV) by Randal Kleiser: Mike
- 1976: Barney Miller - Season 2, episode 18: Hurley
- 1976: The Day the Lord Got Busted by Burt Topper: Brian
- 1978: Laverne & Shirley - Season 4, episode 4: Jake
- 1978: The Big Fix by Jeremy Kagan: Wilson
- 1979: Barnaby Jones - Season 7, episodes 14 and 15: Harley Jessup / Lee Henderson
- 1979: Beanes of Boston - Pilot: Mr. Lucas
- 1979: The Dukes of Hazzard - Season 1, episode 4: Joey Sagalo
- 1979: High Midnight (TV) by Daniel Haller
- 1979: C.H.O.M.P.S. by Don Chaffey: Ken Sharp
- 1980: Condominium (TV) by Sidney Hayers: Julian Higbee
- 1982: Hey Good Lookin' by Ralph Bakshi: "Stomper" (voice)
- 1983: The Sting II by Jeremy Kagan: Gellecher, One of Lonnegan's Bodyguards
- 1996: Underworld by Roger Christian: Ned Lynch
- 1996: Mad Dog Time by Larry Bishop: Nick
- 2004: Kill Bill: Volume 2 by Quentin Tarantino: Larry Gomez
- 2004: Kill Bill: The Whole Bloody Affair by Quentin Tarantino: Larry Gomez
- 2006: The Lather Effect by Sarah Kelly
- 2008: Hell Ride by Larry Bishop: Johnny "Pistolero"
- 2010: Forgotten Pills by David Hefner: Mathis
- 2015: Misirlou by Trevor Simms: Larry With Guns

=== Director ===
- 1996: Mad Dog Time
- 2008: Hell Ride

=== Producer ===
- 1996: Mad Dog Time
- 2008: Hell Ride

=== Screenwriter ===
- 1996: Underworld by Roger Christian
- 1996: Mad Dog Time
- 2008: Hell Ride
