= Well Wishes =

- Release poster
- Directed by: Anderson Boyd
- Screenplay by: Anderson Boyd
- Produced by: Anderson Boyd; Juan Cruz Pochat
- Starring: Shane Callahan; Anna Stromberg; Cullen Moss; Don Henderson Baker
- Cinematography: Daniel Satinoff
- Edited by: Anderson Boyd
- Music by: Eric Kaye; Jason Payne
- Production companies: Caronova Pictures; Heads Up Film
- Release dates: September 24, 2015 (Hollywood Film Festival); May 10, 2016 (United States)
- Running time: 94 minutes
- Country: United States
- Language: English

Well Wishes is a 2015 American independent comedy film written and directed by Anderson Boyd and starring Shane Callahan, Anna Stromberg, Cullen Moss and Don Henderson Baker. The film was released digitally on May 10, 2016 and began streaming on Netflix in the United States, Canada, France, United Kingdom, Italy, and Japan on July 1, 2016.

== Premise ==
After losing his job on a coin-toss a man concocts a fantastical plan to get rich by harvesting coins from wishing fountains. Aided by his friend and a gentle vagrant, his journey leads to the American highway and an indebted traveler who challenges his notions of wealth and true happiness.

== Cast ==
- Shane Callahan as Miles
- Anna Stromberg as Penelope
- Cullen Moss as Jack
- Don Henderson Baker as Durwood
- Nick Basta as Shane
- Audrey Speicher as Melissa
- Jane McNeill as Penelope's Mother
- John Stafford as Eli
- Nate Panning as Hans

== Production ==
After qualifying for the now-defunct North Carolina Film Incentive 25% refund, Well Wishes entered principal photography in October 2013 with a 29-day schedule and 65 shooting locations. The production crew consisted largely of University of North Carolina School of the Arts graduate filmmakers and the cast was filled out with veteran regional actors.

== Release ==
The film premiered at the Hollywood Film Festival on September 24, 2015 and screened at a dozen film festivals across the United States, including in juried competition at the San Diego Film Festival and the Napa Valley Film Festival. Well Wishes won Best Narrative, Best Director, Best Actress and Best Screenplay at the Williamsburg International Film Festival in Brooklyn, NY. After garnering offers from Gravitas Ventures and several mid-level distributors the film was independently released on digital platforms and Netflix on May 10, 2016 and July 1, 2016, respectively.
