= Reprisal (TV series) =

2019 American drama TV series

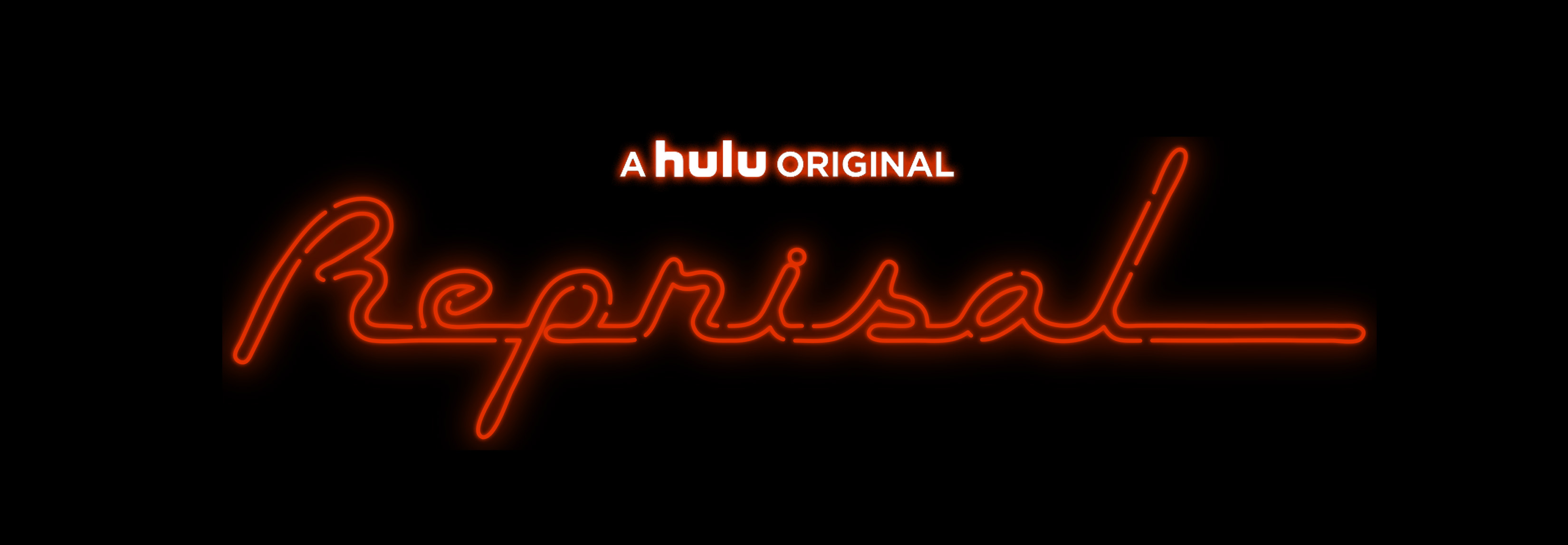
- Genre: Drama
- Created by: Josh Corbin
- Starring: Abigail Spencer; Rodrigo Santoro; Mena Massoud; Rhys Wakefield; Madison Davenport; David Dastmalchian; Gilbert Owuor; W. Earl Brown; Craig Tate; Wavyy Jonez; Shane Callahan; Rory Cochrane
- Country of origin: United States
- Original language: English
- No. of seasons: 1
- No. of episodes: 10

Production
- Executive producers: Josh Corbin; Warren Littlefield; Barry Jossen
- Running time: 41–57 minutes
- Production companies: A+E Studios; The Littlefield Company

Original release
- Network: Hulu
- Release: December 6, 2019

Reprisal is an American television drama series that premiered on Hulu on December 6, 2019. In June 2020, the series was canceled after one season.

== Premise ==
Reprisal follows "a relentless femme fatale who, after being left for dead, leads a vengeful campaign against a bombastic gang of gearheads."

== Cast and characters ==
=== Main ===
- Abigail Spencer as Katherine Harlow / Doris Quinn, originally a member of the Banished Brawlers who was left for dead, reinventing herself as a respectable Detroit caterer named Doris. After being threatened by mobsters, she returned to her roots to wage a calculated war of revenge against the men who betrayed her
- Rodrigo Santoro as Joel Kelly, Burt’s pragmatic second-in-command and a former bare-knuckle champion. While he struggles to maintain the peace between gangs, he is a violent man who uses his daughter, Lyla, to justify his continued involvement in the gang's exploitative lifestyle
- Mena Massoud as Ethan Hart, an employee in Tommy's restaurant, recruited by Katherine to act as her mole within the Brawlers. Though loyal and protective, he struggles with his identity as he finds a sense of belonging among the Phoenixes
- Rhys Wakefield as Matty, one of the Three River Phoenixes, idealistic and intensely devoted believer in the Brawlers' mythology. He views the gang as a sacred family that saved him from his own lack of direction
- Madison Davenport as Meredith Harlow, Burt’s daughter and a prominent Pin-Up at the Bang-A-Rang. Sheltered and restless, she sells illegal drugs on the side while longing for a life beyond the confines of the Brawler compound.
- David Dastmalchian as Johnson, the silent and observant third Phoenix. He is a reliable foundation for his brothers and understands the dark truths of the compound better than anyone else.
- Gilbert Owuor as Bash Brannigan, a high-ranking Brawler and Katherine’s former husband who participated in her attempted murder. Ever since, he has retreated into a solitary life of self-pity and old records after betraying the only person he truly cared about.
- W. Earl Brown as Witt, a location scout for the Brawlers and Katherine's initial informant. He romanticizes his involvement with Katherine but also questions her more dangerous plans.
- Craig Tate as Earl, a war veteran and member of the Monster Ring who specializes in robbing other criminals. He is a methodical, grieving father who eventually accepts Katherine’s quest for revenge as his own.
- Wavyy Jonez as Cordell, Earl’s cousin and a veteran who provides emotional support and perspective to Molly as she adjusts to their violent lifestyle.
- Shane Callahan as Bru, Joel's right hand in managing the Brawlers during Burt's absence.
- Rory Cochrane as Burt, Katherine’s brother and the charismatic, psychopathic leader of the Banished Brawlers.

=== Recurring ===
- Lea DeLaria as Queenie, the emcee and financial manager of the Bang-A-Rang and manager of the Pin-Ups. She is a veteran of the criminal world, prepared to use extreme violence to protect her girls and her home.
- John Ventigmilia as Tolly, the manager of Mr. Bolo's bowling alley after his disappearance, who aids Big Graham in tracking down the Monster Ring.
- Bethany Anne Lind as Molly Quinn, Doris's mousy step-daughter-in-law and a former war nurse, who finds her own strength after plotting the murder of her abusive husband and becoming a getaway driver for the Monster Ring. Lind also plays Grace, Molly's twin sister.
- Scarlett Blum as Lyla, Joel and Rita's young daughter, who processes the violence around her by creating sophisticated mythological stories that often mirror real-life events.
- Louise Barnes as Rita, Lyla's mother and a former River Phoenix, struggling with PTSD while protecting her daughter from the current violence.
- Bill Sage as Jukes, the leader of the Ghouls and a longtime secret confidante of Joel until their relationship is destroyed by the escalating gang war.
- Blake Sheldon as Avron, an unpopular Brawler fast-tracked for membership, constantly harassing the Phoenixes until he takes things too far by accusing Matty of being the mole.
- Ron Perlman as Big Graham, a notorious and physically imposing Detroit mobster who uses Tommy's restaurant as a front and attempts to steal it from Katherine through intimidation.

== Episodes ==
No.	Title	Directed by	Written by	Original release date
1	"The Tale of Harold Horpus"	Jonathan Van Tulleken	Josh Corbin	December 6, 2019
Katherine Harlow confronts her brother Burt, the leader of the Banished Brawlers gang, and threatens to expose him for framing another gang for the murders of Brawlers. Burt chains her to a truck to drag her behind and kill her, but Katherine promises they will see each other again. Years later, under the name Doris Quinn, she cares for her sick husband, Tommy, while facing challenges from her stepson Colin and local gangster "Big" Graham regarding ownership of the family's restaurant. Doris begins plotting revenge against the Brawlers with Witt, her inside contact with the Brawlers. Ethan Hart joins the Three River Phoenixes, who handle supply runs for the Brawlers, and goes through a violent initiation against rival gang the Ghouls with members Matty and Johnson. He also catches the attention of Burt's daughter, Meredith, who has been reprimanded by Joel, the Brawler's acting manager, for drug dealing at the Brawler's club, the Bang-a-Rang. After Tommy encourages Doris to reclaim her strength before passing away, she takes charge of her life by first confronting Colin at home and ultimately shooting him. As she leaves with Colin's wife, Molly, Doris reaches out to Ethan, hinting at further plans as the Brawlers and Phoenixes prepare for a confrontation with the Ghouls.
2	"A Flintlock & A Hound"	Jonathan Van Tulleken	Josh Corbin	December 6, 2019
Several weeks prior, Ethan, a worker at Doris' restaurant in Detroit, was arrested for fatally injuring a rude customer during a fight. Doris bails him out and sends him to the Brawlers for his safety. In the present, tensions rise as the Brawlers meet with the Ghouls, led by Konstantinov. Bash, a high-ranking Brawler, attacks Konstantinov, escalating the conflict despite the warnings of Joel. Doris and Molly go into hiding after being questioned about Colin's death. Doris learns about the threat Big Graham poses, but decides to focus on expanding her operations. Meanwhile, Meredith continues dealing drugs at the Bang-a-Rang, leading to an overdose. When Joel confronts her about it, she brushes him off. Molly and Doris reflect on their choices while hiding in a motel. When Doris leaves, Molly calls her sister, which is overheard by Big Graham, who sends his lawyer, Davie, after her. Doris and Witt visit a bowling alley to recruit criminals against the Brawlers, but when a masked gang robs the bowling alley, Doris decides to pursue the robbers instead.
3	"The Emboldened Conflict"	Jonathan Van Tulleken	Nate Crocker	December 6, 2019
Cousins Cordell and Earl, known as The Monster Ring, successfully rob Mr. Bolo’s gaming room at the bowling alley, prompting the chase with Doris, who sees an opportunity to partner with them. Meanwhile, tensions rise within the Brawlers over the Ghouls' unpaid tax, which Joel warns could escalate conflicts with other gangs and potentially lead to war. Doris encounters misogyny from Earl when she initially proposes a collaboration. Meredith flirts with Ethan and gives drugs to Matty before meeting with her dealer, Gertrude, a member of the Ghouls. After a close call with the police, Ethan questions the Phoenixes' reasons for being involved with the Brawlers. Under the influence of Meredith's drugs, Matty and Johnson explain that Burt and the Brawlers prioritized family and unity until Katherine's betrayal led to a violent war for control among the gangs, causing the Brawlers to grow as they attracted outsiders seeking belonging. Doris brings Mr. Bolo to meet with the Monster Ring, but when he mocks everyone and refuses to help, she shoots him, with Earl and Cordell providing backup.
4	"On the Principles of Horsehound"	Cherie Nowlan	Justin Boyd	December 6, 2019
In a flashback, Burt invites Joel, then a Phoenix, to join the Brawlers, using the deaths of the members they killed to emphasize the importance of family and collective strength. They begin placing Ghoul masks on the bodies when Katherine arrives. In the present, Joel meets with Jukes, his contact with the Ghouls, to discuss their tax payments, earning criticism from Queenie, the Bang-a-Rang's financial manager. Doris begins planning a robbery with Earl and Cordell. Joel discovers Burt is alive as tensions rise between the Brawlers, Phoenixes, and Ghouls. Molly intends to frame Doris for kidnapping as she plots her return to Detroit, but when Davie confronts and threatens her in her room, she kills him. Doris tells Ethan to observe money management at the Bang-A-Rang vault, while Meredith expresses a desire to leave the Bang-A-Rang lifestyle. Doris invites Earl and Cordell to the motel for further planning, where they find Molly with Davie's body. Excited by their upcoming plans, Earl gives Doris monster masks to welcome her and Molly into their group.
5	"The Tiniest Battle"	Cherie Nowlan	Elizabeth Hunter	December 6, 2019
Years earlier, the Three River Phoenixes - Joel, Johnson, and a third member, Rita - get into a fight with a rival gang, after which Joel confesses his love for Rita. In the present, Joel and Rita meet to discuss their daughter, Lyla, but their conversation is tense, with Rita accusing Joel of keeping Lyla from her. Joel suggests shared custody, but Rita wants exclusive custody if she takes Lyla. Doris plans to cause chaos among the Brawlers, using information from Ethan about a Phoenix checkpoint. Witt criticizes Doris' plans and team and expresses romantic interest in her, which she rebuffs. Cordell comforts Molly about her feelings after killing Davie, encouraging her to embrace her identity. Meanwhile, Ethan shares with Matty and Johnson that he doesn't regret fleeing after the murder since it led him to the Phoenixes. Meredith expresses her desire for freedom, rejecting Joel's concerns about her feeling trapped. Lyla tells Bash a story about a war between owls and how she dreamed of being the last mouse. Katherine Harlow infiltrates the checkpoint, kills the Brawlers present, and steals tickets to the Bang-a-Rang. Bash investigates the checkpoint deaths and, finding a Ghouls' mask, goes to the Ghouls' bar and kills several members.
6	"For Love of the Archipelago"	Eva Sørhaug	Lisa Long	December 6, 2019
In flashback, Bash encourages his brother Percy to join the Brawlers for a sense of belonging. In the present, Burt Harlow leads a calm life in the countryside until Queenie tells him about Percy’s death at the checkpoint and urges him to return to his family. Doris struggles to reach Ethan, who ignores her calls, while Molly, a former army nurse, earns respect from veterans Earl and Cordell. Earl shares his painful history with Katherine about the Monster Ring and the loss of his son, who was recruited into it and later killed. Meredith and Gertrude plan to leave town, while Matty questions the accusations against the Ghouls. Burt rallies the Brawlers during Percy's funeral and declares war, though the Phoenixes remain silent. Katherine secretly visits the Brawlers' compound, leaving behind a carved bird for Bash. The next day, Joel dismisses Lyla's story idea about a lost character before Rita takes her home. While at a diner, the Phoenixes discuss Burt's speech, with Matty eager to prove himself, as Katherine reconnects with Ethan under the pretense of not knowing him. Gertrude takes Meredith to the Ghouls’ hideout, where Meredith realizes she's being kidnapped and shoots the Ghouls present, except for Gertrude, who says she had no choice. Meredith takes Gertrude’s bike and leaves.
7	"25 or 6 to 4"	Eva Sørhaug	Adam Lash & Cori Uchida	December 6, 2019
A flashback shows Queenie and Burt kill a couple for assaulting a dancer, and then adopt the couple's young daughter, naming her Meredith. In the present, Meredith escapes the Ghouls, seeking help from Matty, and connects with Ethan, who helps her cope with her shock. She has a tense reunion with Burt, who blames her for her kidnapping due to her drug dealing, while she points out their troubled relationship. Katherine recruits Molly as the getaway driver for the robbery at the Bang-a-Rang, despite Molly's reservations. At the club, Burt tries to reassure Joel about their troubles and joins the Phoenixes on a supply run, assuring them of their importance and promising to make it up to them later. Ethan confronts Katherine about her identity and Meredith's kidnapping, but gets little clarity and is given a bag of guns to hide in the Bang-A-Rang. On the night of the robbery, Katherine and her crew disguise themselves and attempt to steal from the vault, only to find it empty. A confrontation ensues at the club, with Molly joining in to defend Cordell against attackers. Queenie recognizes Katherine but lets her go without a fight. The robbers escape without money, and the dancers clean up the scene before Joel's return.
8	"The Horse Cabbage Heart"	Jonathan Van Tulleken	Salvatore Stabile	December 6, 2019
As a young man, Witt promotes the Bang-A-Rang while avoiding questions about Katherine, the original Pin-Up girl. Years later, he reconnects with her, now known as Doris, as they discuss their future. Joel, Burt, and Queenie investigate the robbery, while new Brawler Avron suspects an informant among them. Cordell and Molly talk about the impact of violence and trauma during his recovery. Earl and Katherine reflect on their misunderstandings about the Brawlers, and Earl considers leaving, while Doris seeks his support. Witt advises Ethan to leave before things get worse, but Ethan decides to stay loyal to his friends. Joel and Matty talk to Jukes about the recent violence and impending war. Matty believes the Brawlers give his life meaning, despite Joel's warnings about the dangers, especially with Katherine seeking revenge. Bash confronts Burt about misleading him regarding Katherine. Ethan and Meredith go on a date at a carnival, where they discuss the robbery and Katherine's disappearance. When Earl takes Ethan to Katherine's motel, he reveals his desire to leave the Brawlers, prompting Meredith, who has followed them, to enter with a gun. She is shocked to find Katherine, but Molly knocks her unconscious.
9	"dammit"	Salli Richardson-Whitfield	Nate Crocker	December 6, 2019
In a flashback, young Bash surprises Katherine with a dilapidated house for their anniversary, but she's unsure about leaving the Bang-A-Rang. In the present, Matty is determined to become a Brawler, despite Joel's warnings about getting involved with Burt. Katherine comforts Meredith, who is uncertain about her role in the family and worried about Ethan's safety. Katherine sends Ethan and Meredith away, but Meredith, after questioning Ethan about the robbery, agrees to keep his secret. Matty faces aggressive questioning from Burt regarding his loyalties. Meredith seeks answers about her family history from Burt, who spins a false narrative blaming Katherine for her parents' deaths. Katherine, feeling defeated, tries to motivate her group to steal money from the Phoenixes and rescue Ethan, and goes out alone for her anniversary. Meredith accuses Queenie of lying about her family and confronts her about Katherine’s alleged involvement in her parents’ deaths. Ethan kills Avron and turns to Matty for help. Burt, Joel, and Queenie pressure Meredith for information about Katherine. A group of Brawlers searches her motel room but finds it empty. Katherine confronts Bash at the house, shooting him and tying him up for a heated discussion about his trying to kill her on Burt's orders. She ultimately stabs him multiple times and leaves just before the Brawlers arrive.
10	"The Horpus Horrendous"	Jonathan Van Tulleken	Josh Corbin	December 6, 2019
12-year-old Katherine Harlow witnesses her brother Burt kill their abusive father and burn their home. Burt manipulates Katherine into joining the Banished Brawlers, but years later, he leaves her for dead after framing her for crimes. Queenie helps Katherine recover and encourages her to leave town to avoid revenge, giving her a gun for protection. The Phoenixes dispose of Avron's body while Bru, Joel, and Burt tend to Bash's wounds, though his survival is unclear. Earl grapples with grief and past conflicts, while Joel suspects a spy among the Brawlers. Ethan confronts Meredith about her betrayal. Katherine feels guilty for not checking in on Molly and reveals her trip is about confronting past pains. The Monster Ring robs the Phoenixes, but Ethan chooses to stay with the Phoenixes. He admits to being the mole, yet Matty and Johnson stand with Ethan and gun down the Brawlers sent to capture him. Joel rescues Lyla from the Ghouls, killing Jukes in the process. Katherine confronts Burt in the farmhouse and shoots him, leaving with a sense of satisfaction at being home. Meredith sees the dead Brawlers and rides forward, rather than turning back.

== Production ==
=== Development ===
On June 18, 2018, it was announced that Hulu had given the production a pilot order. The episode was written by Josh Corbin and directed by Jonathan Van Tulleken. Corbin also served as an executive producer alongside Warren Littlefield and Barry Jossen. Production companies involved with the pilot were A+E Studios and The Littlefield Company. On February 11, 2019, it was announced during the Television Critics Association's annual winter press tour that Hulu had given the production a series order. The series premiered on December 6, 2019. On June 10, 2020, Hulu canceled the series after one season.

=== Casting ===
In August 2018, it was announced that Abigail Spencer, Mena Massoud, David Dastmalchian, and Rhys Wakefield had been cast in the pilot's starring roles. On July 10, 2019, it was reported that Craig Tate, Wavyy Jonez, Shane Callahan, and Rory Cochrane were cast as series regulars. On July 22, 2019, Lea DeLaria was cast in a recurring role.

=== Filming ===
The pilot episode was filmed in Wilmington, North Carolina, and the rest of the first season was filmed in Wilmington.

== Reception ==
On Rotten Tomatoes, the series holds an approval rating of 44% with an average rating of 7/10, based on 16 reviews. The website's critical consensus reads, "Solid performances and a fast pace move Reprisal along, but its style over substance approach is all pulp, little juice." On Metacritic, it has a weighted average score of 53 out of 100, based on 7 critics, indicating "mixed or average reviews".
