= Cry-Baby =

1990 film by John Waters

- Theatrical release poster
- Directed by: John Waters
- Written by: John Waters
- Produced by: Rachel Talalay
- Starring: Johnny Depp; Amy Locane; Susan Tyrrell; Iggy Pop; Ricki Lake; Traci Lords; Polly Bergen
- Cinematography: David Insley
- Edited by: Janice Hampton
- Music by: Patrick Williams
- Production company: Imagine Entertainment
- Distributed by: Universal Pictures
- Release dates: March 14, 1990 (Baltimore); April 6, 1990 (United States)
- Running time: 85 minutes
- Country: United States
- Language: English
- Budget: $8–12 million
- Box office: $8.3 million

Cry-Baby is a 1990 American teen musical romantic comedy film written and directed by John Waters. The film stars Johnny Depp as 1950s teen rebel Wade "Cry-Baby" Walker. It features a large cast, including Amy Locane, Susan Tyrrell, Ricki Lake, Traci Lords, and Polly Bergen; it also has appearances by Troy Donahue, Mink Stole, Joe Dallesandro, Joey Heatherton, David Nelson, Patricia Hearst, and Willem Dafoe.

The film centers on a group of delinquent youth who refer to themselves as "drapes" and their interaction with the rest of the town and its other subculture, the "squares", in 1950s Baltimore, Maryland. "Cry-Baby" Walker, a drape, and Allison, a square, disturb Baltimore society by breaking the subculture taboos and falling in love. The film shows what the young couple has to overcome to be together and how their actions affect the rest of the town.

Part of the film takes place at the now-closed Enchanted Forest amusement park in Ellicott City, Maryland. Others take place in the historic neighborhoods and towns of Hampden, Baltimore, Reisterstown, Jessup, Milford Mill, and Sykesville in Maryland. The only scenes not filmed in Maryland were shot at Golden Oak Ranch in Santa Clarita, California and Hershey Park in Hershey, Pennsylvania.

A box office failure during its initial release, the film has subsequently become a cult classic and spawned a 2008 Broadway musical of the same name, which was nominated for four Tony Awards, including Best Musical.

== Plot ==
In Baltimore 1954, Wade "Cry-Baby" Walker, known for his ability to shed a single tear, leads a group of "drapes". The group includes his sister Pepper, a teenage single mother of two; facially disfigured tough girl Mona "Hatchet-Face" Malnorowski and her devoted boyfriend, runaway rockabilly bass player Milton Hackett; and sexually precocious Wanda Woodward, whose post-World War II conventional parents Hector (a school bus driver) and Maggie (a school traffic warden) constantly embarrass her. One day after school, Allison Vernon-Williams, a beautiful upper-class girl tired of being a "square", approaches Cry-Baby, and the two fall in love. That same day, he interrupts a talent show at the R.S.V.P. Charm School run by Allison's grandmother, and introduces himself to her, though she doubts his overall motives. Cry-Baby invites Allison to a party at Turkey Point, a local hangout spot for the drapes.

Despite her grandmother's skepticism, Allison ultimately accompanies Cry-Baby to Turkey Point, where Hatchet-Face, Pepper, and Wanda give her a "drape" makeover before she sings a duet onstage with him. Later, both commiserate over their shared tragic experiences of losing their parents; he shares that his father was sentenced to the electric chair for being the notorious "Alphabet Bomber" (a killer who bombed places in alphabetical order) along with his mother as an accomplice, while she reveals that her parents took separate flights for safety, but one time, both of their planes went down, killing them. During their conversation, Allison's jealous boyfriend, Baldwin, leads a group of fellow squares in inciting a riot, vandalizing the Drapes' cars with graffiti and setting Cry-Baby's motorcycle, which was a birthday gift from his maternal uncle Belvedere Ricketts and maternal grandmother Ramona Ricketts, ablaze. In court, the judge releases most of the Drapes to their parents and Allison to her grandmother, but consigns Pepper's young children, "Snare-Drum" and "Susie-Q", to the Chatterbox Orphanage and sentences the wrongfully blamed Cry-Baby to the Maryland Training School for Boys until his 21st birthday, outraging his friends and even Allison's grandmother, who is impressed by Cry-Baby's unwavering devotion to Allison.

When Lenora Frigid, who has an unrequited crush on Cry-Baby, claims to be pregnant with his child, Allison feels betrayed and tentatively returns to Baldwin and the squares, though her grandmother warns her against prematurely rushing into such a decision. In the penitentiary, Cry-Baby gets a teardrop tattoo under his left eye from fellow drape Dupree, which he dedicates to Allison. Cry-Baby later escapes through a grate into the prison sewer system, while Milton and Hatchet-Face purloin a helicopter, steer it into the jail yard, and scour the cell block hoping to locate and rescue Cry-Baby. Unsuccessful in doing so, they escape in a garbage collection truck. Cry-Baby finally escapes the sewers, but he encounters a room full of prison guards. Meanwhile, Belvedere and Ramona assist Pepper in freeing her children from the Chatterbox Orphanage, before proceeding to release all the other children as well.

After Allison performs with Baldwin and his clean-cut vocal group, the Whiffles, at the newly constructed Enchanted Forest theme park, her grandmother allies with the Drapes (led by Belvedere), who have successfully infiltrated the area, in convincing her to campaign for Cry-Baby's release. Her performance outside the jail persuades the judge, who has become romantically interested in Allison's grandmother, to release Cry-Baby. As the judge announces Cry-Baby's rehabilitation to reporters, Baldwin immediately provokes Cry-Baby by tauntingly revealing that his grandfather electrocuted Cry-Baby's father. Responsively, Cry-Baby challenges him to a chicken race between his jalopy and Baldwin's car, under the condition that they ride on the roofs and allow their closest friends to drive. With Belvedere driving, several Drapes squeeze themselves into Cry-Baby's car, while Baldwin's friends climb into his car. As the cars race toward each other, Pepper delivers an infant son in the backseat, and she happily accepts her boyfriend's marriage proposal. Baldwin chickens out and his car crashes into a chicken house, allowing Cry-Baby to ultimately emerge victorious. Dupree speeds toward him on his motorcycle, with Allison riding on the back, before slamming on the brakes, sending her somersaulting through the air into Cry-Baby's arms. All spectators cry a single tear, except for Cry-Baby and Allison, who cry from both eyes.

== Cast ==
- Johnny Depp as Wade "Cry-Baby" Walker
  - James Intveld as Cry-Baby's singing voice
- Amy Locane as Allison Vernon-Williams
  - Rachel Sweet as Allison's singing voice
- Susan Tyrrell as Ramona Rickettes, Cry-Baby´s grandmother
- Polly Bergen as Mrs. Vernon-Williams, Allison´s grandmother
- Iggy Pop as Belvedere Rickettes, Ramona´s husband and Cry-Baby´s stepgrandfather
- Ricki Lake as Pepper Walker, Cry Baby´s older sister
- Traci Lords as Wanda Woodward
- Kim McGuire as Mona "Hatchet-Face" Malnorowski
- Darren E. Burrows as Milton Hackett
- Stephen Mailer as Baldwin, boy who wants to be Allison´s boyfriend
- Kim Webb as Lenora Frigid
- Alan J. Wendl as Joe "Toe-Joe" Jackson
- Troy Donahue as Mr. Malnorowski
- Mink Stole as Mrs. Malnorowski
- Joe Dallesandro as Mr. Hackett
- Joey Heatherton as Mrs. Hackett
- David Nelson as Hector Woodward
- Patricia Hearst as Maggie Woodward
- Willem Dafoe as hateful guard
- Jonathan Benya as "Snare-Drum"
- Jessica Raskin as Susie "Susie Q"
- Robert Tyree as Dupree
- Robert Walsh as judge
- Robert Marbury as angelic boyfriend
- Kelly Goldberg as Pepper's baby

== Musical numbers ==
1. "Women in Cadillacs" – Doc Starkes and The Night Riders *(sung along)* – Cry-Baby
2. "Gee" – The Crows *(sung along)* – Cry-Baby, Hatchet-Face, Milton, Pepper, Wanda
3. "Sh-Boom" – Baldwin, the Whiffles
4. "A Teenage Prayer" – Allison
5. "King Cry-Baby" – Cry-Baby, Allison, Hatchet-Face, Milton, Pepper, Wanda
6. "Teardrops Are Falling" – Cry-Baby, Dupree, Prisoners
7. "Doin' Time for Bein' Young" – Cry-Baby, Prisoners
8. "The Naughty Lady of Shady Lane" (Director's Cut) – Baldwin, the Whiffles
9. "Mr. Sandman" – Allison, Baldwin, the Whiffles
10. "Please, Mr. Jailer" – Allison, Cry-Baby, Company, Prisoners
11. "Chicken" (deleted scene) – Baldwin, the Whiffles
12. "High School Hellcats" – Cry-Baby, Allison, Pepper, Company

== Development ==
Cry-Baby was John Waters' first film following the death of his frequent collaborator, drag queen Divine.

== Release ==
Cry-Baby premiered in Baltimore on March 14, 1990, and was released on April 6. It was screened out of competition at the 1990 Cannes Film Festival.

== Reception ==
=== Box office ===
The film opened on April 6, 1990, in 1,229 North American theaters—an unprecedented number for a Waters film. It grossed $3,004,905 ($2,445 per screen) on its opening weekend and $8,266,343 by the end of its theatrical run, against an $8 million budget ($12 million including advertising and promotion).

=== Critical response ===
Cry-Baby received positive reviews from critics. On the website Rotten Tomatoes, the film holds an approval rating of 72% based on 64 reviews, with an average rating of 6.5/10. The website's critics consensus reads, "John Waters' musical ode to the teen rebel genre is infectious and gleefully camp, providing star Johnny Depp with the perfect vehicle in which to lampoon his pin-up image." Metacritic, which uses a weighted average, assigned the film a score of 63 out of 100, based on 22 critics, indicating "generally favorable" reviews. Audiences polled by CinemaScore gave the film an average grade of "B−" on an A+ to F scale. Roger Ebert of the Chicago Sun-Times awarded the film 3 out of 4 stars.

== Musical adaptation ==
Following the 2002 success of the Hairspray musical on Broadway, Cry-Baby became the second Waters film adapted for the musical comedy stage. On Broadway in 2008, the Cry-Baby musical has an original score and adapts no songs from the film.
