= Mad Dog Time =

1996 film by Larry Bishop

- DVD cover
- Directed by: Larry Bishop
- Written by: Larry Bishop
- Produced by: Judith James
- Starring: Ellen Barkin; Gabriel Byrne; Richard Dreyfuss; Jeff Goldblum; Diane Lane
- Cinematography: Frank Byers
- Edited by: Norman Hollyn
- Music by: Earl Rose
- Production companies: United Artists; Bruin Grip Services; Dreyfuss/James Productions; Skylight Films
- Distributed by: MGM/UA Distribution Co.
- Release date: November 8, 1996
- Running time: 93 minutes
- Country: United States
- Language: English
- Budget: $8 million
- Box office: $107,874

Mad Dog Time (also known as Trigger Happy) is a 1996 American ensemble crime comedy film written and directed by Larry Bishop and starring Ellen Barkin, Gabriel Byrne, Richard Dreyfuss, Jeff Goldblum and Diane Lane. The film is notable for the various cameo appearances, including the first (and final) film appearance by Christopher Jones in over a quarter-century.

== Plot ==
The story takes place in a mysterious underworld of swanky nightclubs where armed criminals listen to Rat Pack music and hold shootouts from a seated position, behind desks. Mickey Holliday is the top enforcer for Vic, the mob boss, who is about to be released from a psychiatric facility. In his absence, Ben London has been running Vic's nightclub while Mickey has been romancing both Rita and Grace Everly, which is doubly dangerous inasmuch as they are sisters and Grace was previously Vic's girl.

A rival, Jake Parker, recruits a number of hired guns in an attempt to seize power. Mickey kills the first to challenge him, Lee Turner. The next one brought in by Parker, identified as Nicholas Falco and supposedly the fastest draw of all, murders Mickey's close friend, Jules Flamingo, who is unarmed. A showdown is arranged and Mickey ends up eliminating both Parker and the apparently overrated Falco.

Vic returns to resume his reign as mob boss. He brings with him a new enforcer, the "real" Nicholas Falco, the previous one having been an impostor. "Brass Balls" Ben London promptly challenges Vic for control of the organization (while singing "My Way" on stage in the nightclub) and is shot dead. Falco proceeds to gun down the remaining opposition, including "Wacky" Jackie Jackson, and is eager to shoot it out with Mickey Holliday once and for all.

Mickey attempts to repair his relationship with Rita, who is furious that he has been seeing her sister on the side. Mickey finally confesses to Grace that he has been seeing her in the daytime and Rita at night. She also has been unaware that Vic is back in town. At a final confrontation held in a private office, Grace reveals that she is pregnant with Vic's child. Forced to choose between Holliday and Falco before they shoot it out, Vic sides with his old friend and Grace kills Falco. He and Mickey end up (apparently) living happily ever after with the Everly sisters.

== Cast ==
- Jeff Goldblum as Mickey Holliday
- Richard Dreyfuss as Vic
- Gabriel Byrne as Ben London
- Ellen Barkin as Rita Everly
- Diane Lane as Grace Everly
- Gregory Hines as Jules Flamingo
- Kyle MacLachlan as Jake Parker
- Burt Reynolds as Jackie Jackson
- Larry Bishop as Nicholas Falco
- Henry Silva as Joe "Sleepy Joe" Carlisle
- Michael J. Pollard as "Red" Mash
- Christopher Jones as Fake Falco
- Billy Idol as Lee Turner
- Angie Everhart as Gabriella
- Billy Drago as Wells
- Paul Anka as Danny Marks
- Rob Reiner as Albert
- Joey Bishop as Mr. Gottlieb
- Richard Pryor as Jimmy "The Gravedigger"
- Frank Licari as Vic's Guy

=== Cameo appearances ===
The writer-director's father, Joey Bishop, is briefly seen and speaks one word: "Hello". His character runs Gottlieb's Mortuary ("Gottlieb" being Bishop's real name).

Richard Pryor appears as Gottlieb's sidekick, Jimmy the Grave Digger. Despite his character being mentioned throughout the film, he is in only one scene and speaks few lines. It is Pryor's second-to-last film appearance. He is shown in a wheelchair, and his voice is garbled. His physical deterioration was obvious at the time the film was made.

One scene irrelevant to the plot features Rob Reiner as a limo driver, explaining his humorous philosophy on life to Dreyfuss. Reiner and Larry Bishop were once professional comedy partners.

== Production ==
The film was initially in development for producer Edward R. Pressman before he departed the project. In November 1995, it was reported that Richard Dreyfuss and producing partner Judith James would produce Trigger Happy in which Dreyfus would star alongside Gabriel Byrne and Jeff Goldblum from a script by Larry Bishop who would make his directorial debut. Skylight Films raised the film's budget through foreign pre-sales. Many of the ensemble cast who appeared in the film agreed to appear as they were friends or colleagues of Dreyfuss and Bishop with Rob Reiner having worked with Dreyfuss and Bishop in the improv troupe Sessions and Richard Pryor having acted with Bishop in Wild in the Streets. Bishop's real life father Joey Bishop agreed to film a cameo as Mr. "Gottlieb" (Bishop's real last name) initially for one word, "Hello", but Joey Bishop ad libbed "go to Hell" which was kept in. Bishop himself described the film as a spoof of the films done by the Rat Pack in the 1950s with his experiences meeting Dean Martin and Frank Sinatra laying the ground work for the film.

While Bishop had shot the film under the title Trigger Happy and intended to release the film under that title, Bishop was forced to retitle it to Mad Dog Time in order to avoid confusion with Universal's The Trigger Effect. Upon the film's home video release, the film was distributed under its original title of Trigger Happy.

== Release ==
The film opened on November 8, 1996, on 18 screens in New York, Los Angeles, San Francisco and Toronto. It grossed $41,480 in its opening weekend.

== Critical reception ==
The film was not well received by critics on release. Roger Ebert of the Chicago Sun-Times gave the film a rare zero-star rating, noting:

Mad Dog Time is the first movie I have seen that does not improve on the sight of a blank screen viewed for the same length of time. Oh, I've seen bad movies before. But they usually made me care about how bad they were. Watching Mad Dog Time is like waiting for the bus in a city where you're not sure they have a bus line. ... Mad Dog Time should be cut into free ukulele picks for the poor.

Roger Ebert and partner Gene Siskel of the Chicago Tribune voted this the worst film of 1996 on their television show Siskel & Ebert at the Movies. Ebert repeated his written statement that watching this movie was not preferable to 1 hour and 45 minutes of looking at a blank wall, and mentioned how upset that he was that Siskel won the right to choose this film after a coin toss, so he had to pick the second-worst film of the year, Un indien dans la ville (Little Indian, Big City), a film that Ebert also gave zero stars. Siskel said that he still did not know what the film was about six months after he saw it, and that because, in addition to starring in the film, Richard Dreyfuss is listed as a co-producer, he deserves most of the blame for helping get the story on screen.

A review by Stephen Holden in The New York Times on November 8, 1996, called Mad Dog Time "a rat's nest of hip pretensions posing as a comedy".

In Entertainment Weekly on November 22, 1996, reviewer Ken Tucker described it as "jaw-droppingly incoherent".

The film holds a 17% rating on Rotten Tomatoes, based on 6 reviews.

Bishop was unfazed by the divisive reception stating:

I always viewed the movie as a secret jazz club that you have to go underground to find. Someone will have to dig a little further to find it, but that is the personality who would appreciate the movie anyway.
