= Jessica Raskin =

American actress (born 1982)

- Born: April 26, 1982 (age 44); Woodbridge, Virginia, U.S.
- Occupation: Actress
- Years active: 1989–present

Jessica Raskin (born April 26, 1982) is an American actress. She is perhaps best known for her role as Susie Q in the John Waters film Cry-Baby.

== Select filmography ==
Year	Title	Role
1990	Cry-Baby	Susie Q
2007	Travesty	Hostage
2008	A Darker Reality	Sharon
2010	Forgotten Pills	Cynthia
