= Joey Bishop =

American entertainer (1918–2007)

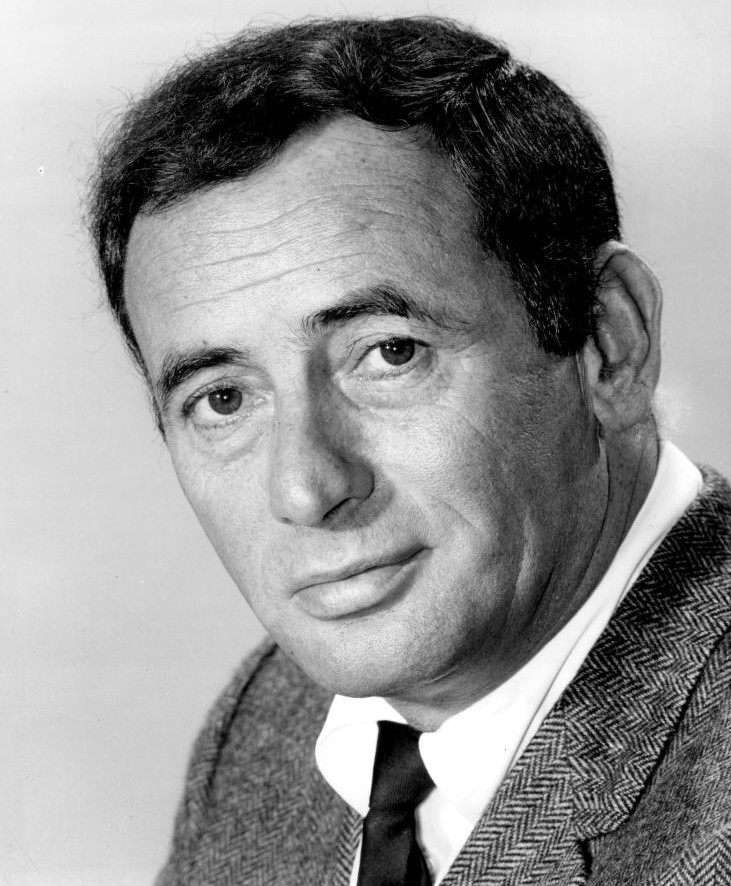
- Bishop in 1967
- Born: Joseph Abraham Gottlieb; February 3, 1918; New York City, U.S.
- Died: October 17, 2007 (aged 89); Newport Beach, California, U.S.
- Occupations: Actor; comedian; talk show host
- Years active: 1948–1996
- Spouse: Sylvia Ruzga (m. 1941; died 1999)
- Children: Larry Bishop

Joseph Abraham Gottlieb (February 3, 1918 – October 17, 2007), known professionally as Joey Bishop, was an American entertainer who appeared on television as early as 1948 and eventually starred in his own weekly comedy series playing a talk/variety show host, then later hosted a late-night talk show with Regis Philbin as his young sidekick on ABC. He also was a member of the "Rat Pack" with Frank Sinatra, Dean Martin, Sammy Davis Jr. and Peter Lawford. He is listed as the 96th entry on Comedy Central's list of 100 greatest comedians.

== Early life and education ==
Bishop, the youngest of five children, was born on February 3, 1918, in the Bronx, New York City, the son of Polish-Jewish immigrants Anna (née Siegel) and Jacob Gottlieb. His father was a bicycle repairman. Bishop was raised in South Philadelphia, Pennsylvania.

Bishop was drafted into the US Army during World War II, and he rose to the rank of sergeant in the Special Services, serving at Fort Sam Houston in Texas.

== Career ==
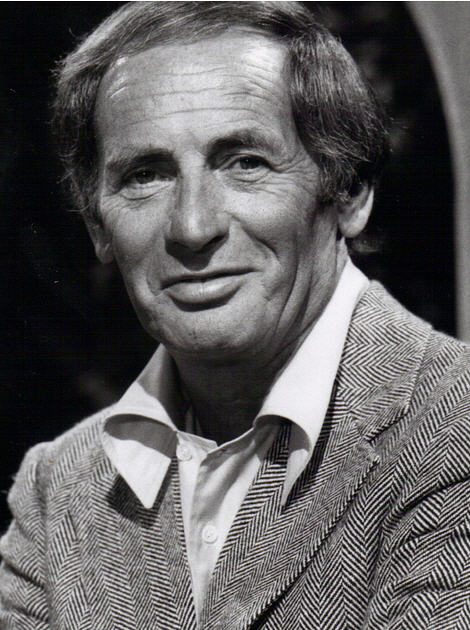
Bishop appearing on The Tonight Show Starring Johnny Carson, c. 1975

Bishop began his career in the 1930s when he skipped his final semester of high school to form a comedy trio with two other boys, performing in nightclubs and burlesque houses in Pennsylvania, New Jersey, and throughout the East Coast. The boys were not related, but called themselves the "Bishop Brothers", borrowing the name of their driver, Glenn Bishop, with each adopting "Bishop" as their stage name. The act was originally made up of Morris "Rummy" Spector, Joey, and Sammy Reisman - who soon dropped out and was replaced by Mel Farber - and were individually known as Rummy Bishop, Joey Bishop, and Mel Bishop - stage names they would keep throughout their careers. The act broke up when Rummy was drafted during World War II, with Joey Bishop continuing as a solo performer until he himself was drafted in 1942. Bishop would later include his former partners in his projects, with Rummy Bishop having a small role in Oceans 11 and Mel Bishop appeared in several roles on The Joey Bishop Show, including one episode. "Must the Show Go On?" in which all three "Bishop Brothers" were reunited for the first time since the 1940s.

Bishop resumed his solo career after he was discharged from the military in August 1945, working at the Casablanca Roadhouse in New Jersey and then becoming an opening act in New York City at the Greenwich Village Inn. He became a regular performer at New York's Latin Quarter nightclub for $1,000 a week, which led to appearances on television and film. Bishop appeared on The Ed Sullivan Show on May 28, 1950. In 1952, Frank Sinatra saw Bishop perform at the Latin Quarter and, impressed, asked Bishop to be his opening act at the Bill Miller's Riviera in Fort Lee, New Jersey and then at the Copacabana in New York and at other venues, leading to Bishop becoming known as "Sinatra's comic" as Sinatra's career ascended in the 1950s.

Bishop's growing celebrity led to his being a headliner in top nightclubs his own right, and television appearances on The Dinah Shore Chevy Show on April 19, 1957, and many other variety programs in the early days of television. He guest-hosted The Tonight Show substituting for Jack Paar, and then guest-hosted The Tonight Show Starring Johnny Carson at least 175 times in the 1960s, and from 1971 to 1976 more than anyone else until that time (Jay Leno and Joan Rivers later surpassed his record). He also frequently appeared on Steve Allen's and Jack Paar's previous versions of The Tonight Show. He later had his own late-night show.

Bishop starred in the situation comedy The Joey Bishop Show that premiered on September 20, 1961, and ran for 123 episodes over four seasons, first on NBC and later CBS. Bishop played Joey Barnes, at first a publicity agent and then later a talk show host. Abby Dalton joined the cast in 1962 as his wife.

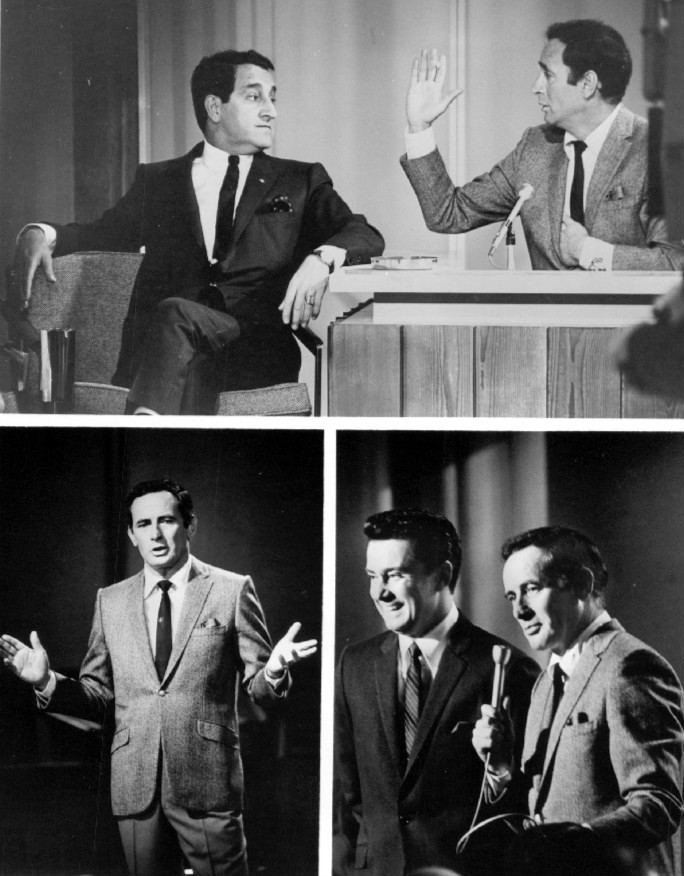
Publicity stills for The Joey Bishop Show, including singer and actor Danny Thomas as guest (top) and newcomer Regis Philbin as Bishop's sidekick (bottom right)

Bishop later hosted a 90-minute late-night talk show, also titled The Joey Bishop Show, that was launched by ABC on April 17, 1967, as competition to Carson's Tonight Show and ran until December 26, 1969. His sidekick was then-newcomer Regis Philbin.

Bishop was among the stars of the original Ocean's 11 film about military veterans who reunite in a plot to rob five Las Vegas casinos on New Year's Eve. He co-starred with Frank Sinatra, Dean Martin, Sammy Davis Jr., and Peter Lawford, also known as the Rat Pack, although the five of them did not publicly acknowledge that name.

During filming, the five entertainers performed together onstage in Vegas at the Sands Hotel. Bishop did only a little singing and dancing, but he told jokes and wrote most of the act's material. He later appeared with Sinatra, Martin, Davis, and Lawford in the military adventure Sergeants 3 (1962), a loose remake of Gunga Din (1939), and with Martin in the Western comedy Texas Across the River (1966), in which he portrayed an American Indian.

Sinatra fell out with Bishop in 1964 when Sinatra asked him to fill in for him at the Cal-Neva Lodge in Lake Tahoe as a favor and Bishop demanded $50,000 and to be flown in a private jet. Sinatra, offended, hung up on Bishop and cut him out of the Rat Pack.

Bishop was the only member of the Rat Pack to work with members of a younger group of actors dubbed the Brat Pack, appearing (as a ghost) in the film Betsy's Wedding (1990) with Molly Ringwald and Ally Sheedy. His final appearance in a film was a non-speaking role in Mad Dog Time (1996), written and directed by his son, Larry. His character was named Gottlieb, which was his real surname. The film was panned by critics.

Bishop was portrayed by Bobby Slayton in the HBO film The Rat Pack (1998).

== Personal life and final years ==
Bishop wed Sylvia Ruzga in 1941, and they were married for 58 years until her death from lung cancer in 1999. They had one son, Larry Bishop, a film director and actor.

As a widower, Bishop had a longtime companion, Nora Garibotti. In failing health for some time, Bishop died at age 89 of multiple organ failure on October 17, 2007, in his home on Lido Isle, a man-made island in the harbor of Newport Beach, California, as the last surviving Rat Pack member. Per Bishop's wishes, his remains were cremated and scattered in the Pacific Ocean near his home.

The Broadcast Pioneers of Philadelphia posthumously inducted Bishop into their Hall of Fame in 2009.

== Filmography ==
- 1958 The Deep Six as "Ski" Krokowski
- 1958 The Naked and the Dead as Roth
- 1958 Onionhead as Sidney Gutsell
- 1960 Ocean's 11 as "Mushy" O'Connors
- 1960 Pepe as Joey Bishop (Cameo)
- 1962 Sergeants 3 as Sergeant Major Roger Boswell
- 1963 Johnny Cool as Holmes, Used Car Salesman
- 1966 Texas Across the River as Kronk
- 1967 A Guide for the Married Man as Charlie, Technical Adviser
- 1967 Who's Minding the Mint? as Ralph Randazzo
- 1967 Valley of the Dolls as M.C. At Telethon
- 1986 The Delta Force as Harry Goldman, Passenger
- 1990 Betsy's Wedding as Mr. Hopper, Eddie's Father
- 1996 Mad Dog Time as Mr. Gottlieb (final film role)

== Television work ==
- The Polly Bergen Show (May 3, 1958) (guest star) as himself
- Richard Diamond, Private Detective in "No Laughing Matter" (1959) as Joey Kirk
- The Frank Sinatra Timex Show: Welcome Home Elvis (May 12, 1960) as himself
- What's My Line? (1960–1966) (frequent panelist) as himself
- Make Room for Daddy (1961)
- The Joey Bishop Show (1961–1965) situation comedy co-starring Abby Dalton, originally on NBC, then CBS as Joey Barnes / Joey Barnes Jr. / Louie
- Password (1961–1967) (frequent guest)
- Get Smart (September 23, 1967) (cameo guest) as himself
- The Tonight Show Starring Johnny Carson (1962–1992) (frequent guest & substitute host) as himself
- The Hollywood Squares (1966–1981) (frequent panelist) as himself
- The Joey Bishop Show (1967–1969) late-night 90-minute talk show on ABC
- Rowan & Martin's Laugh-In (March 25, 1968/April 29, 1968/January 18, 1971) as himself
- Chico and the Man (1976) as Charlie
- The Jacksons Variety Show (July 7, 1976) special guest star as himself
- Celebrity Sweepstakes (1974–1977) (frequent panelist) as himself
- Match Game (1976) as a panelist
- Liar's Club (1976–1978) (frequent panelist) as himself
- Break the Bank (1976–1977) (frequent panelist) as himself
- Murder, She Wrote (1985) as Buster Bailey
- Glory Years (1987) as Sydney Rosen
