= Lindsey Gort =

American actress

- Born: April 24, 1984 (age 42); Scottsdale, Arizona
- Years active: 2009–present
- Spouse: Beau Laughlin (m. 2015)

Lindsey Gort (born April 24, 1984) is an American actress. She is known for her portrayals of Samantha Jones on CW's The Carrie Diaries and Amy Quinn on the legal drama series All Rise.

== Career ==
Gort was born in Scottsdale, Arizona. She got involved in the local theater at a young age and her first appearance was in 2009 in a short drama titled Goodbye Horses.

In 2010, she starred in the drama thriller Forgotten Pills and the TV movie Wing Bitches. Gort appeared in a minor role in the 2013 action film 2 Guns.

Her first major break came in 2013, when after being turned down for the role twice, she was cast as a young Samantha Jones in the Sex and the City prequel series "The Carrie Diaries". The older and previous version of the character from Sex and the City was played by Kim Cattrall. Cattrall congratulated Gort on Twitter for winning the role and also offered her some advice on playing the character.

In March 2015, Gort joined the dark-comedy sitcom series Impastor in a recurring role of Ashlee. During 2015, she also starred in a Christmas themed TV movie called How Sarah Got Her Wings.

In 2016, she starred in the CBS TV comedy movie Real Good People. In September 2017, Gort was cast as the DC comics character Detective Amy Rohrbach on the superhero show Titans. Her appearance on the show was short-lived as the character was killed off in the second episode of the series.

In late 2019, Gort was cast as Amy Quinn on the CBS legal drama series All Rise. Gort made recurring appearances throughout the first season of the show and was subsequently promoted to series regular for the second season of the series. She returned in the show's third season.

Gort has guest starred on such shows as Lucifer, Baby Daddy, Modern Family and American Housewife''. She starred in TV movie Love is a Piece of Cake in 2020.

== Personal life ==
Gort married her boyfriend Beau Laughlin in July 2015 in a ceremony at The Paramour Mansion in Silver Lake, California.

== Filmography ==
=== Film ===
Year	Title	Role	Notes
2009	Goodbye Horses	Alex	Short film
2010	Forgotten Pills	Alicia	
2010	Wing Bitches	Lindsey	TV movie
2010	T.V.	Usher	Short film
2011	Our Footloose Remake	Rusty	
2012	Destinea, Our Island	Abbie Garner	
2012	Body Languages	Girl	Short film
2012	Phoenix	Susan	
2013	Marvel One-Shot: Agent Carter	Poolside Woman #1	Short film
2013	2 Guns	Waitress Marjorie	
2013	Social Media Anonymous	Cindy	Short film
2015	How Sarah Got Her Wings	Sarah	TV movie
2015	Self Promotion	Tess	TV movie
2016	Urban Cowboy	Vivian	TV movie
2016	Real Good People	June	TV movie
2019	Best Intentions	Katie Baxter	TV movie
2019	A Merry Christmas Match	Jillian Winters	TV movie
2020	Love is a Piece of Cake	Jessie Dale	TV movie

=== Television ===
Year	Title	Role	Notes
2012	All the Wrong Notes	Unknown	1 episode
2012	Sketchy	Cindy	1 episode
2013	Vegas	Ginny Binder	1 episode
2013	Jimmy Kimmel Live!	Kymm	1 episode
2013–14	The Carrie Diaries	Samantha Jones	Main (season 2), 13 episodes
2014	Two Popular Girls' Guide	Lindsey	3 episodes, also writer
2015	Baby Daddy	Ashley	2 episodes
2015–16	Impastor	Ashlee	13 episodes
2016	Modern Family	Cindy	1 episode
2016	The Last Tycoon	Hazel Ward	1 episode
2017	Pure Genius	Georgia Ray	1 episode
2017	American Housewife	Holly	1 episode
2017	Lucifer	Candy Morningstar / Fletcher	2 episodes
2017	Do You Want to See a Dead Body?	Marissa	1 episode
2017	S.W.A.T.	Jilly	1 episode
2018	Titans	Amy Rohrbach	2 episodes
2018	Single Parents	Judith	1 episode
2019	A Million Little Things	Joanna	1 episode
2019–2023	All Rise	Amy Quinn	Main (season 2–3), recurring (season 1)
2021	Station 19	Ingrid Saunders	4 episodes
2024	Dead Boy Detectives (TV series)	Maxine	3 episodes
