= Donny Boaz =

American actor

- Born: Waxahachie, Texas, U.S.
- Occupation: Actor
- Years active: 2003–present

Donny Boaz is an American actor who recently portrayed the role of Chance Chancellor on The Young and the Restless.

== Career ==
Boaz began his career as a male model for brands such as Abercrombie, Mothers Against Drunk Driving, and runway work in Milan, Italy. However, it was a Calvin Klein underwear shoot that cost him his university scholarship just before his junior year at Southwestern Assemblies of God University because the school didn't believe it was very "Christ-like" to model men's underwear. After losing his scholarship, Boaz spent the next six years working as a model in various countries.

In 2003, he left Paris, France and returned to Dallas to pursue a career as a working actor. That same year, Boaz appeared in the "America's Sexiest Man" contest in which one of the prizes was a multi-episode role on soap opera All My Children; from that series he went to Guiding Light and appeared in several episodes.

Although he lacked formal training as an actor, he successfully auditioned for several projects, including the role of "Pfc. Patrick Miller" in the television movie Saving Jessica Lynch. He was able to use the experience of the role later on to help him get cast as "Buckley" in the television series SIX.

In 2015, Boaz was cast as "Bill Bradley" in the film My All American where he worked with director Angelo Pizzo.

In 2019, Boaz was cast in the role of Chance Chancellor in The Young and the Restless.

In 2020, Boaz appeared in the role of James Cranbourne in the movie "When We Last Spoke" and in 2022 he had a memorable cameo in the HBO series "The Staircase."

== Filmography ==
=== Film ===
Year	Title	Role	Notes
2003	Saving Jessica Lynch	Pfc. Patrick Miller	TV movie
2005	Devon's Ghost: Legend of the Bloody Boy	Scott	Video
2007	The Great Debaters	Oklahoma City College Debater #1	
2008	Soul Flyers	Chris Cutler	Short
2008	A Noble Way	Mark Noble	Short
2008	Redemption	Sloane	Short
2008	Ready or Not (Any Other Way)	Alan	
2009	Midgets vs. Mascots	Baseball Player	
2009	Martini the Movie	Muscle Stud	Short
2010	Drop Me Off	A&R Executive	
2010	The Ascent	Pete	
2010	Manifest Destiny: A Fates Calling	Manifest Lactue	Short
2010	Tryst	Adam	Short
2011	Killer School Girls from Outer Space	Ben	
2011	Cold War	Agent Thomas	Short
2011	A Schizophrenic Love Story	Leo	
2011	Tale of the Time Thieves	Joshua Franklin Jacobs	Short
2011	Reunited	Tonya's Finacee	
2012	Return to Vengeance	Don	
2012	Deep in the Heart	Danny	
2012	Because I Love You	Sheriff Jenkins	
2012	Mixtape	Jake	Short
2012	Victims	Jason Wells	Short
2012	Supernatural Activity	Brock Haas	
2012	Shades of Julia	Jason Wells	
2012	Into the South	Jeff	Short
2012	Harvester of Terror 2: Redneck's Revenge	The Cop	Short
2012	The Significant Other	Rick	
2012	Unknown Caller	James	Short
2012	Raptor Ranch	Lucas Young	
2013	Inventing Adam	Jeff Whitborn	
2013	Faith	Doctor	Short
2013	Dreamer	Kevin	
2013	Office Rehab	Darren	Short
2013	Synapse	Jake	Short
2013	The Anna Nicole Story	Larry Birkhead	TV movie
2013	CrazySexyCool: The TLC Story	Bill Diggins	TV movie
2014	13 Sins	Witter	
2014	Elsa & Fred	Waiter #2	
2014	The Furies	Kyle Banks	Short
2014	Amazin' Grace	Brad Tillson	Short
2014	Flashes	John Rotit	
2014	Could This Be Love	Angelo	
2014	Left Behind	Passenger #2	
2014	Faded	Driskell	Short
2014	The Rolling Road	Young Alton	Short
2015	Kill or Be Killed	Minister	
2015	The Adventures of Pepper and Paula	Malcolm	
2015	Sorrow	Detective Farrell	
2015	Higher Mission	Barber	
2015	Discredit	Patrick	Short
2015	My All-American	Bill Bradley	
2015	The Foreign Exchange Student	Mr. Adams	
2016	Silent Retreat	Zacry Stabard	
2016	Divorce Texas Style	Blake	
2016	Second Impression	Dan McPherson	
2017	The Perfect Wife	Officer Addison	
2017	Forsaken	Duffy	
2017	Color Me You	James Zorn	
2017	Osprey	Mark Brennan	
2017	Road Less Traveled	Ray	TV movie
2017	Afterburn/Aftershock	Chad Williams	
2018	The Terrible Two	Fred P.	
2018	The Beach House	Palmer	TV movie
2018	The Iron Orchard	Charlie Dupree	
2018	A Sister's Secret	Grady	TV movie
2018	Heaven's War	Gabriel	
2018	Hometown Christmas	Will Collins	TV movie
2019	When We Last Spoke	James Cranbourne	
2019	Fear Bay	Tony Sorno	
2019	Polly	Mike	Short
2019	Magnolia	Noah	
2019	12 Pups of Christmas	Martin	
2020	Assassin 33 A.D.	Brandt	
2021	Black Easter	Brandt	
2021	Girls Getaway Gone Wrong	Antonio	TV movie
2022	Flip Turn	Coach Mitch	
2023	Dawn at Dominion	Shiloh Taylor	
2023	Hidden Murder Island	Frank	TV movie
2023	I'll Be There	Jack	
2023	The Con-Test	Jacob	
2023	Smoke N Love	Billy	
2023	Body in the Attic	Ethan	TV movie
2024	The Actor	Pastor William Turpin	
2024	Bissonnet 2: Back on the Blade	Detective Benjamin	

=== Television ===
Year	Title	Role	Notes
2007	Friday Night Lights	Miles Handford	Episode: "Seeing Other People"
2008-09	Pink	Cliff	Guest Cast: Season 2-3
2010	The Good Guys	Ryan Winkler	Episode: "Broken Door Theory"
2010	Exposed	Chase	Main Cast
2010	Lone Star	Travis	Episode: "Pilot"
2010	Chase	Neil Collins	Episode: "Under the Radar"
2012	GCB	Reverend John Tudor	Episode: "Pilot"
2012	Monkey Tales	The Gentleman	Episode: "I Know This Great Place"
2013	The Glades	Grant	Episode: "Three's Company"
2013	Graceland	Vance	Recurring Cast: Season 1
2013	Drop Dead Diva	George Randal	Episode: "Secret Lives"
2013-14	Dallas	Bo McCabe	Guest: Season 2, Recurring Cast: Season 3
2014	NCIS	Navy Lieutenant Kit Jones	Episode: "Page Not Found"
2014	Red Band Society	Sam Houston	Episode: "How Did We Get Here?"
2015	The Originals	Guy	Episode: "Fire with Fire"
2015	NCIS: New Orleans	Navy Lieutenant Brad Ryder	Episode: "Foreign Affairs"
2016	Mercy Street	Ezekial Davis	Episode: "The Dead Room"
2017	SIX	Buckley	Recurring Cast: Season 1
2017	Chicago Justice	Mike Soto	Episode: "Friendly Fire"
2017	Daytime Divas	Reverend Dylan	Episode: "Shut It Down"
2018	Lucifer	“Dangerous Doug” Libby	Episode: "All About Her"
2018	NCIS: New Orleans	Max Burris	Recurring Cast: Season 4
2019–21	The Young and the Restless	Chance Chancellor	Regular Cast
2020	Star Trek: Picard	Skantal	Episode: "Absolute Candor"
2020	P-Valley	Wyatt Kyle	Recurring Cast: Season 1
2021-22	All American	Jacob	Guest: Season 3, Recurring Cast: Season 4
2022	The Staircase	Tyrone Lacour	Recurring Cast
2023	FBI: Most Wanted	Cole Dewey	Episode: "Rangeland"
2026	R.J. Decker	Preston Howard	Episode: "In Vanity Veritas"
