= Anderson Boyd =

American film director

- Born: November 18, 1985 (age 40); Raleigh, North Carolina
- Education: Ravenscroft School; University of North Carolina at Wilmington
- Occupation: Filmmaker
- Years active: 2009–present

Anderson Drew Boyd (born November 18, 1985) is an American director, screenwriter, producer and film editor from Raleigh, North Carolina. He studied filmmaking at the University of North Carolina at Wilmington and is best known for his debut feature film, Well Wishes (2015).

== Career ==
After leaving Wilmington, North Carolina for Manhattan, Boyd matriculated into then worked for a post-production trade school before hiring into its sister company. His first major screen credit was the Academy Award nominated Winter's Bone (2010), of which he was attributed by director Debra Granik with shaping into a neo-noir, away from observational iterations. During this period he cut scenes for the films Cold Weather (2010) and Up Heartbreak Hill (2011).

He worked as an on-line editor for the Sundance documentaries Joan Rivers: A Piece of Work, The Tillman Story, the SXSW documentary Strange Powers: Stephin Merritt and the Magnetic Fields and subsequently in creative offline editing with the Independent Spirit Award nominated film The History of Future Folk and the Adult Swim television series The Heart, She Holler and Delocated.

Boyd's feature directorial debut, Well Wishes, was a 2013 quarter-finalist of Francis Ford Coppola's American Zoetrope Screenplay Contest before entering production in October 2013. The film was lensed at 65 locations across North Carolina over a period of 29 days with a production budget of only $300,000, qualifying it for the now-defunct North Carolina Film Incentive 25% refund. Boyd won Best Director, Best Screenplay and Best Feature Narrative for the film at the 2015 Williamsburg International Film Festival. He is currently writing a follow-up feature film, an international crime drama concerning 3D printing.

== Filmography ==
=== Feature films ===
Year	Title	Credited as			
Year	Title	Director	Writer	Producer	Editor
2019	The Fox Hunter			Yes	Yes
2018	Dead Envy			Yes	Yes
2015	Well Wishes	Yes	Yes	Yes	Yes

=== Short films ===
Year	Title	Credited as			
Year	Title	Director	Writer	Producer	Editor
2013	The Redwoods	Yes		Yes	
2013	Every Story Ends in Stone	Yes	Yes	Yes	Yes
2010	The Last Dinner	Yes	Yes	Yes	Yes
