= Andrea Fellers =

American film director

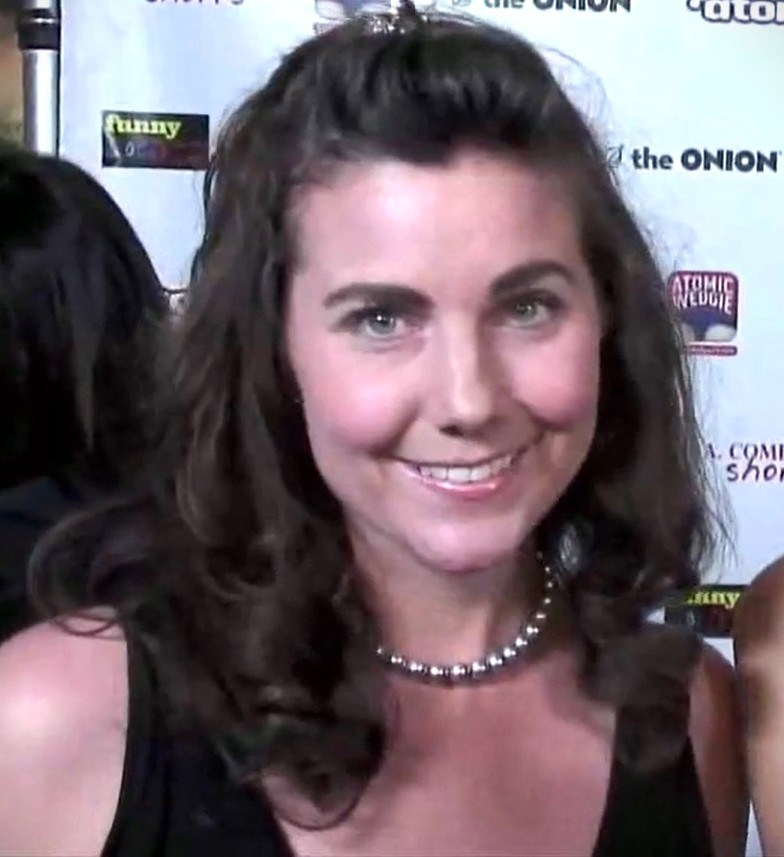
- Fellers in 2009
- Occupations: Artist; film director; producer

Andrea Fellers is an American artist, film director, and producer.

She produced and directed The Truth About You (2014) and created artwork for the movie, which was included in a solo art exhibit “Hollywood Love Letters” at the ArcLight in Hollywood, California. The exhibit included several of her earlier works, as well as commissioned pieces in which she did abstract interpretations of movies that influence her.

She began her career in the film industry as an actress, and has appeared opposite Amy Smart, Sean Hayes, Laura Cayouette and Richard Dreyfus.

In 2009, Fellers was one of seven filmmakers chosen to direct and produce an experimental film based on a song from the Linda Perhacs album, Parallelograms. Fellers incorporated all elements of nature in "Call of the River" and created in-camera effects by shooting reflections of nature and water in mirrors and other reflective objects. "Call of the River" premiered at the Redcat Disney Hall Theatre in Los Angeles during "Thought Forms & Parallelograms: An Evening of Visual Music With Linda Perhacs and Friends."

Fellers produced the film Isle of Dogs (2014) which starred Andrew Howard and Barbara Nedeljáková.
