= The Terrible Two =

- Directed by: Billy Lewis
- Written by: Billy Lewis
- Produced by: Reid Doyle; Jonathan Landau
- Starring: Cari Moskow; Reid Doyle; Devin McGee; Arielle Breslerman; Ariana Baron
- Cinematography: Stephen Thompson
- Music by: Dizi Johnson; Matt Rose
- Production company: Orange St Films
- Distributed by: Uncork’d Entertainment
- Release date: March 6, 2018
- Running time: 84 minutes
- Country: United States
- Language: English

The Terrible Two is an American psychological/paranormal/horror film written and directed by Billy Lewis. The film stars Reid Doyle, Cari Moscow, Donny Boaz, Devin McGee, and Shane Callahan.

It was filmed during an eleven-day period in Wilmington, North Carolina using Lewis's home.

== Plot ==
One year after the deaths of their daughters Addie and Jade, Albert Poe tries to move on while his wife Rose is still stuck in her grief, baking a birthday cake for the girls and speaking of them in present tense.

Talking to her therapist Dr. Connor, Rose describes seeing evidence that her daughters are alive and mentions finding a manuscript about demons in the attic. Dr. Connor urges the couple to sell the house, sensing something bad lurking there. Researching the house and its prior owner Jack Wilson, Rose discovers newspaper archives about suspicious activity in the house.

Albert lists the house for sale but dismisses the manuscript as religious propaganda. However, he discovers a tape recording showing that their daughters were coaxed onto the roof by an unseen entity, only to fall to their deaths. S strange woman named Nebula, appears in their home and chastised Albert and Rose for not properly researching the house. She cuts Albert's face with a knife before leaving, stating that nothing can save them. Later that night, Albert wakes to find Rose in a trance-like state, brushing a doll's hair while saying that Albert never loved them nor made them a priority. A scene then shows that a local realtor named Fred is plotting with Nebula to force the couple out of the house, but that they must now allow events to play out on their own.

The next day, Dr. Connor arrives at the house and informs Albert that Jack Wilson was a pseudonym for a man named Donovan Peebles. Twenty-six years ago, Donovan murdered two Girl Scouts in the house in order to rid his body of demons. The two then discover that Rose is in the girls' room and has been possessed. Albert subdues Rose and seemingly frees her from possession but is unable to convince her to leave. He discovers a drawing of their deaths by the girls' hands and decides that they must leave. While going to get his gun, Albert discovers Dr. Connor's corpse. While trying to flee the house Albert is confronted by his daughters, who demand that he tell the truth. It is revealed that Albert killed them by breaking their necks. Rose, now possessed, stabs Albert to death.

Sometime later, Fred shows the house to another family with two daughters, saying it became too much for the previous owners.

== Cast ==
- Cari Moscow as Rose Poe
- Reid Doyle as Albert Poe
- Arielle Breslerman as Addie Poe
- Ariana Baron as Jade Poe
- Devin McGee as Dr. Connor
- Martyn Woleben as Scott
- Tracy McMullan as Nebula
- Donny Boaz as Fred
- Eric Johann as Donovan Peebles

== Release ==
The Terrible Two was released through video-on-demand on March 6, 2018, by Uncork’d Entertainment.

== Reception ==
Horror Society rated the movie a 6.5 out of 10, stating that "It looks great, it’s shot well, the actors are phenomenal, the story is emotionally-charged and enthralling. The only thing that hinders it is the amount of horror. I’m sorry, I just wasn’t impressed. That needed to be turned up a notch…or two." Film Threat and Starburst both criticized the film, which Film Threat noted "struggles to find its footing, pulled apart by horror tropes, dodgy acting and unrealistic characters" and Starburst called "painful". Daily Grindhouse was also critical.
