= List of American films of 2005 =

This is a list of American films released in 2005.

== Box office ==
The highest-grossing American films released in 2005, by domestic box office gross revenue, are as follows:

Highest-grossing films of 2005
Rank	Title	Distributor	Domestic gross
1	Star Wars: Episode III – Revenge of the Sith	20th Century Fox	$380,270,577
2	The Chronicles of Narnia: The Lion, the Witch and the Wardrobe	Disney	$291,710,957
3	Harry Potter and the Goblet of Fire	Warner Bros. Pictures	$290,013,036
4	War of the Worlds	Paramount Pictures	$234,271,354
5	King Kong	Universal Pictures	$218,080,025
6	Wedding Crashers	New Line Cinema	$209,255,921
7	Charlie and the Chocolate Factory	Warner Bros. Pictures	$206,459,076
8	Batman Begins	Warner Bros. Pictures	$205,343,774
9	Madagascar	DreamWorks Distribution	$193,595,521
10	Mr. & Mrs. Smith	20th Century Fox	$186,283,815

== January–March ==
Opening		Title	Production company	Cast and crew	Ref.
J A N U A R Y	7	White Noise	Universal Pictures / Gold Circle Films	Geoffrey Sax (director); Niall Johnson (screenplay); Michael Keaton, Deborah Kara Unger, Chandra West, Ian McNeice, Mike Dopud, Nicholas Elia, Keegan Connor Tracy, Sarah Strange, Amber Rothwell, Suzanne Ristic, Mitchell Kosterman	
J A N U A R Y	14	Coach Carter	Paramount Pictures / MTV Films / Tollin/Robbins Productions	Thomas Carter (director); Mark Schwahn, John Gatins (screenplay); Samuel L. Jackson, Robert Ri'chard, Rob Brown, Ashanti, Debbi Morgan, Vincent Laresca, Antwon Tanner, Channing Tatum, Rick Gonzalez, Texas Battle, Adrienne Bailon, Dana Davis, Octavia Spencer, Chauntal Lewis, Robert Hoffman, Denise Dowse, Nana Gbewonyo, Matt Jaworski	
J A N U A R Y	14	Elektra	20th Century Fox / Regency Enterprises / Marvel Enterprises	Rob Bowman (director); Zak Penn, Stuart Zicherman, Raven Metzner (screenplay); Jennifer Garner, Goran Višnjić, Kirsten Prout, Will Yun Lee, Cary-Hiroyuki Tagawa, Terence Stamp, Colin Cunningham, Hiro Kanagawa, Natassia Malthe, Bob Sapp, Jason Isaacs, Kurt Max Runte, Chris Ackerman, Edison T. Ribeiro, Jana Mitsoula	
J A N U A R Y	14	Racing Stripes	Warner Bros. Pictures / Alcon Entertainment	Frederik Du Chau (director); David Schmidt (screenplay); Bruce Greenwood, Hayden Panettiere, M. Emmet Walsh, Wendie Malick, Gary Bullock, Frankie Muniz, Mandy Moore, Dustin Hoffman, Whoopi Goldberg, Michael Clarke Duncan, Jeff Foxworthy, Joshua Jackson, Joe Pantoliano, Michael Rosenbaum, Steve Harvey, David Spade, Snoop Dogg, Fred Dalton Thompson, Jansen Panettiere, Phil Proctor, Mona Marshall, Chris Edgerly, Dee Bradley Baker, Jess Harnell, Robert Clotworthy, Nicholas Guest, Archie Hahn, Paul Pape, Eddie Frierson, Jason Harris, Anne Lockhart, Joshua Seth, Claudette Wells	
J A N U A R Y	18	Tom and Jerry: Blast Off to Mars	Warner Home Video / Warner Bros. Animation / Turner Entertainment	Bill Kopp (director/screenplay); Bill Kopp, Dee Bradley Baker, Jeff Bennett, Corey Burton, Kathryn Fiore, Jess Harnell, Brad Garrett, Tom Kenny, Rob Paulsen, Frank Welker, Billy West	
J A N U A R Y	19	Assault on Precinct 13	Rogue Pictures	Jean-François Richet (director); James DeMonaco (screenplay); Ethan Hawke, Laurence Fishburne, John Leguizamo, Maria Bello, Ja Rule, Drea de Matteo, Matt Craven, Brian Dennehy, Gabriel Byrne, Kim Coates, Dorian Harewood, Currie Graham, Titus Welliver, Aisha Hinds	
J A N U A R Y	21	Are We There Yet?	Columbia Pictures / Revolution Studios	Brian Levant (director); Steven Gary Banks, Claudia Grazioso, J. David Stem, David N. Weiss (screenplay); Ice Cube, Nia Long, Aleisha Allen, Philip Daniel Bolden, Jay Mohr, Tracy Morgan, M. C. Gainey, C. Ernst Harth, Nichelle Nichols, Sean Millington, Henry Simmons, David Barclay	
J A N U A R Y	21	The Phantom of the Opera	Warner Bros. Pictures	Joel Schumacher (director/screenplay); Andrew Lloyd Webber (screenplay); Gerard Butler, Emmy Rossum, Patrick Wilson, Miranda Richardson, Minnie Driver, Simon Callow, Ciaran Hinds, Victor McGuire, Jennifer Ellison, Murray Melvin, Kevin McNally, James Fleet, Ramin Karimloo, Margaret Preece	
J A N U A R Y	28	Alone in the Dark	Lions Gate Films	Uwe Boll (director); Elan Mastai, Michael Roesch, Peter Scheerer (screenplay); Christian Slater, Tara Reid, Stephen Dorff, Frank C. Turner, Matthew Walker, Will Sanderson, Mike Dopud, Francoise Yip, Mark Acheson, Darren Shahlavi, Karin Konoval, Ed Anders, Brendan Fletcher	
J A N U A R Y	28	Hide and Seek	20th Century Fox	John Polson (director); Ari Schlossberg (screenplay); Robert De Niro, Dakota Fanning, Famke Janssen, Elisabeth Shue, Amy Irving, Dylan Baker, Melissa Leo, Robert John Burke	
F E B R U A R Y	1	Mulan II	Walt Disney Home Entertainment	Darrell Rooney, Lynne Southerland (directors); Michael Lucker, Chris Parker, Roger S.H. Schulman (screenplay); Ming-Na Wen, B.D. Wong, Mark Moseley, Lucy Liu, Harvey Fierstein, Sandra Oh, Gedde Watanabe, Lauren Tom, Jerry Tondo, Pat Morita, George Takei, June Foray, Freda Foh Shen, Soon-Tek Oh, Frank Welker, Jeff Bennett, Michelle Kwan, Lea Salonga, Judy Kuhn, Mandy Gonzalez, Tress MacNeille, Liliana Mumy, Rob Paulsen, Kevin Michael Richardson, Brian Tochi, April Winchell, Keone Young, Hayley Westenra, Grace Rolek, Jillian Henry, Beth Blankenship, Randy Crenshaw, Jessica Rotter	
F E B R U A R Y	4	Boogeyman	Screen Gems / Ghost House Pictures	Stephen Kay (director); Eric Kripke, Juliet Snowden, Stiles White (screenplay); Barry Watson, Emily Deschanel, Skye McCole Bartusiak, Tory Mussett, Andrew Glover, Lucy Lawless, Charles Mesure, Phil Gordon, Jennifer Rucker, Robyn Malcolm, Michael Saccente, Louise Wallace, Brenda Simmons, Josie Tweed, Ian Campbell, Andrew Eggleton, Olivia Tennet	
F E B R U A R Y	4	The Wedding Date	Universal Pictures / Gold Circle Films	Clare Kilner (director); Dana Fox (screenplay); Debra Messing, Dermot Mulroney, Amy Adams, Peter Egan, Holland Taylor, Jeremy Sheffield, Jack Davenport, Sarah Parish, Jolyon James, Linda Dobell, Jay Simon	
F E B R U A R Y	8	Aloha, Scooby-Doo!	Warner Home Video / Warner Bros. Animation	Tim Maltby (director); Temple Mathews (screenplay); Frank Welker, Casey Kasem, Mindy Cohn, Grey DeLisle, Mario Lopez, Ray Bumatai, Teri Garr, Adam West, Tom Kenny, Dee Bradley Baker, Tia Carrere	
F E B R U A R Y	11	Hitch	Columbia Pictures / Overbrook Entertainment	Andy Tennant (director); Kevin Bisch (screenplay); Will Smith, Eva Mendes, Kevin James, Amber Valletta, Michael Rapaport, Adam Arkin, Julie Ann Emery, Robinne Lee, Nathan Lee Graham, Jeffrey Donovan, Paula Patton, Kevin Sussman, Ato Essandoh	
F E B R U A R Y	11	Inside Deep Throat	Universal Pictures / Imagine Entertainment / HBO Documentary Films / World of Wonder	Fenton Bailey, Randy Barbato (directors/screenplay); Dennis Hopper, John Waters, Hugh Hefner, Larry Flynt, Annie Sprinkle, Gore Vidal, Gerard Damiano, Dick Cavett, Wes Craven, Bill Maher, Harry Reems, David Winters, Norman Mailer, Erica Jong, Catharine MacKinnon, Camille Paglia, Tony Bill, Dr. Ruth Westheimer, Linda Lovelace, Francis Ford Coppola, Warren Beatty, Johnny Carson, Bob Hope, Jack Nicholson, Gloria Steinem, New York City Mayor John Lindsay, Charles Keating, Alan Dershowitz, Larry Parrish, Al Goldstein, Georgina Spelvin, Andrea True, Sepy Dobronyi, Helen Gurley Brown, Ralph Blumenthal, Xaviera Hollander, Carl Bernstein, Dan Rowan, Dick Martin, Peter Bart, Roy Cohn, Susan Brownmiller, Tom Snyder, Warren Burger, Jimmy Carter, Rosalynn Carter, John Chancellor, Jeff Conaway, Walter Cronkite, Phil Donahue, Eric Edwards, Eddie Fontaine, Redd Foxx, Whitman Mayo, Roger Mudd, Pat Nixon, Richard Nixon, Harry Reasoner, Tina Russell, Morley Safer, Howard K. Smith, Arlen Specter, Chuck Traynor, Demond Wilson	
F E B R U A R Y	11	Pooh's Heffalump Movie	Walt Disney Pictures	Frank Nissen (director); Brian Hohlfeld, Evan Spiliotopoulos (screenplay); Jim Cummings, John Fiedler, Ken Sansom, Peter Cullen, Kath Soucie, Brenda Blethyn, Nikita Hopkins, Kyle Stanger	
F E B R U A R Y	12	Lackawanna Blues	HBO Films	George C. Wolfe (director); Ruben Santiago-Hudson (screenplay); S. Epatha Merkerson, Marcus Carl Franklin, Mos Def, Carmen Ejogo, Louis Gossett Jr., Macy Gray, Terrence Dashon Howard, Delroy Lindo, Rosie Perez, Liev Schreiber, Jimmy Smits, Jeffrey Wright, Ernie Hudson, Julie Benz, Patricia Wettig, Ruben Santiago-Hudson, Charlayne Woodard, Robert Bradley, Thomas Jefferson Byrd, Kathleen Chalfant, Hill Harper, Barry Shabaka Henley, Lou Myers, Adina Porter, Henry Simmons, Michael Kenneth Williams, Saul Williams, Eugene Lee, Ryan Michelle Bathe	
F E B R U A R Y	18	Because of Winn-Dixie	20th Century Fox / Walden Media	Wayne Wang (director); Joan Singleton (screenplay); AnnaSophia Robb, Jeff Daniels, Cicely Tyson, Dave Matthews, Eva Marie Saint, Lara Grice, Marca Price, Luke Benward, Courtney Jines, BJ Hopper, Nick Price, Elle Fanning, Becca Lish, Lenore Banks, John McConnell, Jared Day, Harland Williams, Julia Lashae	
F E B R U A R Y	18	Constantine	Warner Bros. Pictures / Village Roadshow Pictures / Vertigo DC Comics / The Donners' Company	Francis Lawrence (director); Kevin Brodbin, Frank Cappello (screenplay); Keanu Reeves, Rachel Weisz, Shia LaBeouf, Djimon Hounsou, Tilda Swinton, Pruitt Taylor Vince, Gavin Rossdale, Peter Stormare, Francis Guinan, José Zúñiga, Jesse Ramirez	
F E B R U A R Y	18	Son of the Mask	New Line Cinema	Lawrence Guterman (director); Lance Khazei (screenplay); Jamie Kennedy, Alan Cumming, Traylor Howard, Steven Wright, Kal Penn, Bob Hoskins, Ben Stein, Magda Szubanski, Sandy Winton, Rebecca Massey, Ryan Johnson, Victoria Thaine, Duncan Young, Peter Flett, Amanda Smyth, Ryan and Liam Falconer, Bear the Dog, Bill Farmer, Richard Steven Horvitz, Joyce Kurtz, Mona Marshall, Mary Matilyn Mouser, Neil Ross	
F E B R U A R Y	25	Cursed	Dimension Films	Wes Craven (director); Kevin Williamson (screenplay); Christina Ricci, Joshua Jackson, Jesse Eisenberg, Judy Greer, Milo Ventimiglia, Portia de Rossi, Shannon Elizabeth, Mýa, Kristina Anapau, Michael Rosenbaum, Eric Ladin, Michelle Krusiec, Nick Offerman, Derek Mears, Scott Baio, Craig Kilborn, Lance Bass, Bowling for Soup	
F E B R U A R Y	25	Diary of a Mad Black Woman	Lions Gate Films / The Tyler Perry Company	Darren Grant (director); Tyler Perry (screenplay); Kimberly Elise, Steve Harris, Shemar Moore, Cicely Tyson, Tyler Perry, Lisa Marcos, Tamara Taylor, Tiffany Evans, Gary Anthony Sturgis, Tamela Mann, Chandra Currelley, Judge Mablean Ephriam, Whitney Houston, Bobby Brown, Wilbur Fitzgerald	
F E B R U A R Y	25	Man of the House	Columbia Pictures / Revolution Studios	Stephen Herek (director); Robert Ramsey, Matthew Stone, John J. McLaughlin (screenplay); Tommy Lee Jones, Christina Milian, Paula Garcés, Monica Keena, Vanessa Ferlito, Kelli Garner, Anne Archer, Brian Van Holt, Cedric the Entertainer, Shea Whigham, R. Lee Ermey, Terrence Parks, Paget Brewster, Shannon Marie Woodward, Liz Vassey, Rick Perry	
M A R C H	4	Be Cool	Metro-Goldwyn-Mayer / Jersey Films	F. Gary Gray (director); Peter Steinfeld (screenplay); John Travolta, Uma Thurman, Vince Vaughn, Cedric the Entertainer, André Benjamin, Robert Pastorelli, Christina Milian, Harvey Keitel, The Rock, Danny DeVito, Paul Adelstein, Debi Mazar, Gregory Alan Williams, Seth Green, James Woods, Anthony J. Ribustello, Carol Duboc, Minae Noji, Arielle Kebbel, Kimberly J. Brown, Margaret Travolta, Scott Adsit, Nick Loren, Shanell Woodgett, Dan Brown, Aerosmith, Wyclef Jean, Sergio Mendes, The Black Eyed Peas, Gene Simmons, RZA, Fred Durst, Anna Nicole Smith, The Pussycat Dolls, Russ Irwin	
M A R C H	4	The Jacket	Warner Independent Pictures / Mandalay Pictures	John Maybury (director); Massy Tadjedin (screenplay); Adrien Brody, Keira Knightley, Kris Kristofferson, Jennifer Jason Leigh, Kelly Lynch, Brad Renfro, Daniel Craig, Steven Mackintosh, Brendan Coyle, Mackenzie Phillips, Jason Lewis, Richard Dillane, Jonah Lotan, Angel Coulby, Paul Birchard, Nigel Whitmey, Ian Porter, Anthony Edridge, Kerry Shale, Angus MacInnes, Richard Durden, Tristan Gemmill, Colin Stinton, Tara Summers, Angelo Andreou, Teresa Gallagher, Charneh Demir, Garrick Hagon, Fish	
M A R C H	4	The Pacifier	Walt Disney Pictures / Spyglass Entertainment	Adam Shankman (director); Thomas Lennon, Robert Ben Garant (screenplay); Vin Diesel, Lauren Graham, Faith Ford, Brittany Snow, Max Thieriot, Carol Kane, Brad Garrett, Morgan York, Kegan and Logan Hoover, Bo and Luke Vink, Chris Potter, Tate Donovan, Denis Akiyama, Scott Thompson	
M A R C H	11	Hostage	Miramax Films / Stratus Film Company / Cheyenne Enterprises / Equity Pictures	Florent Siri (director); Doug Richardson (screenplay); Bruce Willis, Kevin Pollak, Ben Foster, Jonathan Tucker, Jimmy Bennett, Michelle Horn, Marshall Allman, Serena Scott Thomas, Rumer Willis, Kim Coates, Robert Knepper, Tina Lifford, Ransford Doherty, Marjean Holden, Michael D. Roberts, Art LaFleur, Keith Hines, Randy McPherson, Hector Luis Bustamante, Kathryn Joosten, Johnny Messner, Glenn Morshower, Jamie McShane, Jimmy 'Jax' Pinchak	
M A R C H	11	Robots	20th Century Fox Animation / Blue Sky Studios	Chris Wedge (director); David Lindsay-Abaire, Lowell Ganz, Babaloo Mandel (screenplay); Ewan McGregor, Halle Berry, Greg Kinnear, Mel Brooks, Amanda Bynes, Drew Carey, Jim Broadbent, Stanley Tucci, Robin Williams, Dianne Wiest, Jennifer Coolidge, Paul Giamatti, Dan Hedaya, Jay Leno, Natasha Lyonne, Harland Williams, Chris Wedge, Lucille Bliss, Paula Abdul, Randy Jackson, Simon Cowell, Al Roker, Stephen Tobolowsky, Lowell Ganz, James Earl Jones, Will Denton, Jansen Panettiere, Terry Bradshaw, Damien Fahey, Jackie Hoffman, Alan Rosenberg, Chris Moyles, Chingy, James Brown, Lara Cody, Darin De Paul	
M A R C H	18	Ice Princess	Walt Disney Pictures	Tim Fywell (director); Hadley Davis (screenplay); Michelle Trachtenberg, Joan Cusack, Kim Cattrall, Hayden Panettiere, Trevor Blumas, Erik King, Diego Klattenhoff, Kirsten Olson, Signe Ronka, Juliana Cannarozzo, Paul Sun-Hyung Lee, Martha MacIsaac, Connie Ray, Michelle Kwan, Jocelyn Lai, Shanique Ollivierre-Lake, Amy Stewart, Kristina Whitcomb	
M A R C H	18	The Ring Two	DreamWorks Pictures	Hideo Nakata (director); Ehren Kruger (screenplay); Naomi Watts, Simon Baker, David Dorfman, Elizabeth Perkins, Gary Cole, Sissy Spacek, Ryan Merriman, Emily VanCamp, Kelly Stables, Mary Elizabeth Winstead, Kelly Overton, James Lesure, Daveigh Chase, Marilyn McIntyre, Jesse Burch, Michael Dempsey, Kirk B.R. Woller, Chane't Johnson, Aleksa Palladino, Shannon Cochran, Bonnie Morgan	
M A R C H	24	Miss Congeniality 2: Armed and Fabulous	Warner Bros. Pictures / Castle Rock Entertainment / Village Roadshow Pictures	John Pasquin (director); Marc Lawrence (screenplay); Sandra Bullock, Regina King, Enrique Murciano, William Shatner, Ernie Hudson, Heather Burns, Diedrich Bader, Treat Williams, Vic Chao, John DiResta, Abraham Benrubi, Nick Offerman, Eileen Brennan, Stephen Tobolowsky, Elisabeth Röhm, Leslie Grossman, Lusia Strus, Megan Cavanagh, Dolly Parton, Regis Philbin, Joy Philbin, Octavia Spencer, Molly Gottlieb, Christopher Ford, Ross Adam	
M A R C H	25	Guess Who	Columbia Pictures / Regency Enterprises	Kevin Rodney Sullivan (director); David Ronn, Jay Scherick, Peter Tolan (screenplay); Bernie Mac, Ashton Kutcher, Zoe Saldaña, Judith Scott, Hal Williams, Kellee Stewart, Lawrence Hilton-Jacobs, Sherri Shepherd, Robert Curtis Brown, RonReaco Lee, Phil Reeves, Nicole Sullivan, Jessica Cauffiel, Niecy Nash, Kimberly Scott, Richard Lawson	
M A R C H	25	The Ballad of Jack and Rose	IFC Films	Rebecca Miller (director/screenplay); Daniel Day-Lewis, Catherine Keener, Camilla Belle, Ryan McDonald, Paul Dano, Jason Lee, Jena Malone, Beau Bridges, Susanna Thompson	
M A R C H	25	Oldboy	Egg Film / CJ Entertainment	Park Chan-wook (director/screenplay); Hwang Jo-yun, Lim Jun-hyung (screenplay); Choi Min-sik, Yoo Ji-tae, Kang Hye-jung	
M A R C H	25	D.E.B.S.	Samuel Goldwyn Films / Screen Gems	Angela Robinson (director/screenplay); Sara Foster, Jordana Brewster, Meagan Good, Devon Aoki, Jill Ritchie, Geoff Stults, Jimmi Simpson, Holland Taylor, Michael Clarke Duncan, Jessica Cauffiel, Aimee Garcia, Jennifer Carpenter, Scoot McNairy |	
M A R C H	30	Beauty Shop	Metro-Goldwyn-Mayer	Bille Woodruff (director); Kate Lanier, Norman Vance Jr. (screenplay); Queen Latifah, Alicia Silverstone, Andie MacDowell, Alfre Woodard, Mena Suvari, Kevin Bacon, Djimon Hounsou, Sherri Shepherd, Golden Brooks, Bryce Wilson, Keshia Knight Pulliam, Paige Hurd, Lil' JJ, Omari Hardwick, Adele Givens, Sheryl Underwood, LisaRaye McCoy, Kimora Lee Simmons, Della Reese, Andrew Levitas, Octavia Spencer, Birdman, Wilmer Valderrama, Reagan Gomez-Preston, Nancy Lenehan, Laura Hayes, Jim Holmes, Joyful Drake, Tawny Dahl, Ki Toy Johnson	

== April–June ==
Opening		Title	Production company	Cast and crew	Ref.
A P R I L	1	Sin City	Dimension Films / Troublemaker Studios	Frank Miller, Robert Rodriguez (directors/screenplay); Jessica Alba, Benicio del Toro, Brittany Murphy, Clive Owen, Mickey Rourke, Bruce Willis, Elijah Wood, Devon Aoki, Alexis Bledel, Powers Boothe, Rosario Dawson, Michael Clarke Duncan, Carla Gugino, Josh Hartnett, Rutger Hauer, Jaime King, Michael Madsen, Nick Stahl, Rick Gomez, Nick Offerman, Marley Shelton, Tommy Flanagan, Jude Ciccolella, Lisa Marie Newmyer, Nicky Katt, Clark Middleton, Patricia Vonne, Scott Teeters, Frank Miller, Robert Rodriguez	
A P R I L	1	The Upside of Anger	New Line Cinema	Mike Binder (director/screenplay); Joan Allen, Kevin Costner, Erika Christensen, Keri Russell, Alicia Witt, Evan Rachel Wood, Mike Binder, Tom Harper, Sarah Coomes, Dane Christensen, Danny Webb, Magdalena Manville, Suzanne Bertish, David Firth, Rod Woodruff, Stephen Greif, Arthur Penhallow	
A P R I L	8	Fever Pitch	20th Century Fox	Peter Farrelly, Bobby Farrelly (directors); Lowell Ganz, Babaloo Mandel (screenplay); Drew Barrymore, Jimmy Fallon, James B. Sikking, JoBeth Williams, Jason Spevack, Jack Kehler, Lenny Clarke, Ione Skye, Siobhan Fallon Hogan, KaDee Strickland, Marissa Jaret Winokur, Evan Helmuth, Zen Gesner, Jackie Burroughs, Stephen King, Kris Williams, Steve Levy, Willie Garson, Armando Riesco, Brett Murphy, Andrew Wilson, Johnny Damon, Trot Nixon, Jason Varitek, Jim Rice, Joe Castiglione, Don Orsillo, Dennis Eckersley	
A P R I L	8	Kim Possible Movie: So the Drama	Buena Vista Television	Steve Loter (director); Bob Schooley, Mark McCorkle (screenplay); Christy Carlson Romano, Will Friedle, Nancy Cartwright, Tahj Mowry, John DiMaggio, Nicole Sullivan, Ricky Ullman, Gary Cole, Jean Smart, Shaun Fleming, Raven-Symoné, Kirsten Storms, Rider Strong, Diedrich Bader, Eddie Deezen, Clyde Kusatsu, Lauren Tom, Kevin Michael Richardson, Maurice LaMarche, Stephen Root, Tara Strong, April Winchell	
A P R I L	8	Sahara	Paramount Pictures / Bristol Bay Productions	Breck Eisner (director); Thomas Dean Donnelly, Joshua Oppenheimer, John C. Richards, James V. Hart (screenplay); Matthew McConaughey, Steve Zahn, Penélope Cruz, Lambert Wilson, Glynn Turman, Delroy Lindo, William H. Macy, Lennie James, Rainn Wilson, Patrick Malahide, Robert Cavanah, Jude Akuwudike, Rakie Ayola, Paulin Fudouop, Maurice Lee	
A P R I L	13	Palindromes	Wellspring Media	Todd Solondz (director/screenplay); Matthew Faber, Ellen Barkin, Richard Masur, Hillary B. Smith, Danton Stone, John Gemberling, Stephen Adly Guirgis, Debra Monk, Walter Bobbie, Tyler Maynard, David Castro, Richard Riehle, Will Denton, Sharon Wilkins, Shayna Levine, Jennifer Jason Leigh, Angela Pietropinto, Bill Buell, Robert Agri, Stephen Singer, Maggie Moore, Sydney Matuszak, Emani Sledge, Valerie Shusterov, Hannah Freiman, Rachel Corr	
A P R I L	13	State Property 2	Lions Gate Films	Damon Dash (director); Adam Moreno (screenplay); Beanie Sigel, N.O.R.E, Damon Dash, Michael Bentt, Omillio Sparks, DJ Clue?, Roselyn Sanchez, Juelz Santana, Winky Wright, Cam'ron, Kanye West, Ol' Dirty Bastard, Oschino, Freeway, Young Gunz, Jim Jones, Duan Grant, Sundy Carter, Nicole Wray, Mariah Carey, 'Fame' Jamal Grinnage MOP, 'Billy' MOP, 'Fox' MOP, Loon, Angie Martinez, Omahyra Mota, Bernard Hopkins	
A P R I L	15	The Amityville Horror	Metro-Goldwyn-Mayer / Dimension Films / Platinum Dunes / Radar Pictures	Andrew Douglas (director); Scott Kosar (screenplay); Ryan Reynolds, Melissa George, Jesse James, Jimmy Bennett, Chloë Grace Moretz, Rachel Nichols, Philip Baker Hall	
A P R I L	15	House of D	Lions Gate Films / Tribeca Productions / Ovation Entertainment / Bob Yari Productions / Southpaw Entertainment	David Duchovny (director/screenplay); Anton Yelchin, Téa Leoni, David Duchovny, Erykah Badu, Robin Williams, Frank Langella, Zelda Williams, Magali Amadei, Olga Sosnovska, Orlando Jones, Stephen Spinella, Alice Drummond, Mark Margolis, Claire Lautier, Willie Garson, Adam LeFevre, Leslie Lyles, Jonah Meyerson, Lisby Larson, Andrée Damant, Étienne Draber, Chantal Garrigues, Erica Tazel, Mikey Reid	
A P R I L	16	Reefer Madness: The Movie Musical	Showtime	Andy Fickman (director); Kevin Murphy, Dan Studney (screenplay); Kristen Bell, Christian Campbell, Neve Campbell, Alan Cumming, Ana Gasteyer, Steven Weber, John Kassir, Amy Spanger, Robert Torti, Christine Lakin, John Mann, Ken Kirzinger, Britt Irvin, Alexz Johnson, Kevin McNulty, Lynda Boyd, Michael Goorjian, Harry S. Murphy, Tom Arntzen, Stephen Sisk, Robert Clarke, Ruth Nichol	
A P R I L	22	Madison	Metro-Goldwyn-Mayer	William Bindley (director/screenplay); Scott Bindley (screenplay); Jim Caviezel, Jake Lloyd, Mary McCormack, Bruce Dern, Paul Dooley, Brent Briscoe, Mark Fauser, Reed Diamond, Frank Knapp Jr., Chelcie Ross, Byrne Piven, William Shockley, Matt Letscher, Richard Lee Jackson, Kristina Anapau, Vincent Ventresca, Cody McMains, Carl Amari, Jim Hendrick, Troy Waters, Dean Biasucci, Brie Larson, John Mellencamp	
A P R I L	22	The Interpreter	Universal Pictures / Working Title Films	Sydney Pollack (director); Charles Randolph, Scott Frank, Steven Zaillian (screenplay); Nicole Kidman, Sean Penn, Catherine Keener, Jesper Christensen, Yvan Attal, Earl Cameron, Curtiss Cook, George Harris, Michael Wright, Tsai Chin, Clyde Kusatsu, Eric Keenleyside, Hugo Speer, Maz Jobrani, Yusuf Gatewood, Robert Clohessy, Terry Serpico, David Zayas, Sydney Pollack, Adrian Martinez, Byron Utley	
A P R I L	22	King's Ransom	New Line Cinema	Jeffrey W. Byrd (director); Wayne Conley (screenplay); Anthony Anderson, Jay Mohr, Kellita Smith, Nicole Ari Parker, Regina Hall, Loretta Devine, Donald Faison, Charlie Murphy, Leila Arcieri, Brooke D'Orsay, Roger Cross, Jackie Burroughs, Christian Potenza, Lawrence Dane, Lisa Marcos, Robert Norman Smith	
A P R I L	22	A Lot like Love	Touchstone Pictures / Beacon Pictures	Nigel Cole (director); Colin Patrick Lynch (screenplay); Ashton Kutcher, Amanda Peet, Kathryn Hahn, Kal Penn, Ali Larter, Taryn Manning, Gabriel Mann, Jeremy Sisto, Tyrone Giordano, Amy Aquino, Moon Bloodgood, Sam Pancake	
A P R I L	22	Kung Fu Hustle	Columbia Pictures Film Production Asia/ Star Overseas/ Beijing Film Studio [zh]/ Taihe Film Investment/ China Film Group/ Huayi Brothers	Stephen Chow (director/screenplay); Huo Xin, Chan Man-keung, Tsang Kan-cheung (screenplay); Stephen Chow, Danny Chan, Yuen Wah, Yuen Qiu, Eva Huang, Leung Siu-lung	
A P R I L	29	The Hitchhiker's Guide to the Galaxy	Touchstone Pictures / Spyglass Entertainment	Garth Jennings (director); Douglas Adams, Karey Kirkpatrick (screenplay); Martin Freeman, Sam Rockwell, Mos Def, Zooey Deschanel, Bill Nighy, Warwick Davis, Anna Chancellor, Alan Rickman, Helen Mirren, Stephen Fry, John Malkovich, Thomas Lennon, Simon Jones	
A P R I L	29	XXX: State of the Union	Columbia Pictures / Revolution Studios	Lee Tamahori (director); Simon Kinberg (screenplay); Ice Cube, Willem Dafoe, Samuel L. Jackson, Scott Speedman, Peter Strauss, Xzibit, Michael Roof, Sunny Mabrey, Nona Gaye, John G. Connolly, Ramon De Ocampo	
A P R I L	30	Warm Springs	HBO Films	Joseph Sargent (director); Margaret Nagle (screenplay); Kenneth Branagh, Cynthia Nixon, Kathy Bates, Tim Blake Nelson, Jane Alexander, David Paymer, Matthew O'Leary, Matt Malloy, Nelsan Ellis, Melissa Ponzio, Mike Pniewski, Brian F. Durkin, Devon Gearhart, Felicia Day, E. Roger Mitchell, Jody Thompson, Teal Sherer, Franklin D. Roosevelt, Andy Davoli, Marianne Fraulo, Turner Dixon, Tripp Hennington, Sam Frihart, Carrie Adams, Wilbur Fitzgerald, Ron Clinton Smith, Steve Coulter	
M A Y	3	The Sandlot 2	20th Century Fox Home Entertainment	David Mickey Evans (director/screenplay); Brett Kelly, Sean Berdy, Reece Thompson, Teryl Rothery, Greg Germann, James Earl Jones, Steve Garvey, David Mickey Evans, Tom Guiry, Mike Vitar, James Willson, Max Lloyd-Jones, Samantha Burton, Cole Evan Weiss, Neilen Benvegnu, Jessica King, McKenzie Freemantle, Griffin Reilly Evans, Austin Dunn	
M A Y	6	Crash	Lions Gate Films / Bob Yari Productions / DEJ Productions / Bull's Eye Entertainment	Paul Haggis (director/screenplay); Bobby Moresco (screenplay); Sandra Bullock, Don Cheadle, Matt Dillon, Jennifer Esposito, Brendan Fraser, Terrence Howard, Chris "Ludacris" Bridges, Thandie Newton, Michael Peña, Ryan Phillippe, Larenz Tate, Shaun Toub, Bahar Soomekh, Ashlyn Sanchez, Karina Arroyave, Loretta Devine, Beverly Todd, William Fichtner, Keith David, Daniel Dae Kim, Nona Gaye, Bruce Kirby, Tony Danza, Kathleen York, Sylvia Kelegian, Marina Sirtis	
M A Y	6	House of Wax	Warner Bros. Pictures / Village Roadshow Pictures / Dark Castle Entertainment	Jaume Collet-Serra (director); Chad Hayes, Carey W. Hayes (screenplay); Elisha Cuthbert, Chad Michael Murray, Brian Van Holt, Paris Hilton, Jared Padalecki, Jon Abrahams, Robert Ri'chard, Damon Herriman, Andy Anderson, Emma Lung, Dragicia Debert, Murray Smith	
M A Y	6	Jiminy Glick in Lalawood	Metro-Goldwyn-Mayer / Gold Circle Films	Vadim Jean (director); Martin Short, Michael Short, Paul Flaherty (screenplay); Martin Short, Jan Hooks, Janeane Garofalo, Mo Collins, Aries Spears, Linda Cardellini, John Michael Higgins, Elizabeth Perkins, Larry Joe Campbell, Carlos Jacott, Corey Pearson, Robert Trebor, Gary Anthony Williams, Alex Diakun, Peter Breck, Ellie Harvie, Darren Shahlavi, Christine Willes, Peter Kelamis, Willem Dafoe, Whoopi Goldberg, Jake Gyllenhaal, Kevin Kline, Rob Lowe, Steve Martin, Kurt Russell, Susan Sarandon, Chloë Sevigny, Sharon Stone, Kiefer Sutherland, Forest Whitaker	
M A Y	6	Kingdom of Heaven	20th Century Fox / Scott Free Productions	Ridley Scott (director); William Monahan (screenplay); Orlando Bloom, Eva Green, Jeremy Irons, David Thewlis, Brendan Gleeson, Marton Csokas, Liam Neeson, Edward Norton, Michael Sheen, Kevin McKidd, Ulrich Thomsen, Nikolaj Coster-Waldau, Iain Glen, Alexander Siddig, Eriq Ebouaney, Bronson Webb, Velibor Topić, Ghassan Massoud, Khaled Nabawy, Jon Finch, Martin Hancock, Nathalie Cox, Jouko Ahola, Giannina Facio, Philip Glenister, Steven Robertson, Angus Wright	
M A Y	13	Kicking & Screaming	Universal Pictures	Jesse Dylan (director); Leo Benvenuti, Steve Rudnick (screenplay); Will Ferrell, Robert Duvall, Kate Walsh, Mike Ditka, Dylan McLaughlin, Josh Hutcherson, Musetta Vander, Steven Anthony Lawrence, Rachael Harris, Peter Jason, Phill Lewis, Karly Rothenberg, Alex Borstein, Laura Kightlinger, David Herman, Timm Sharp, Martin Starr, Dallas McKinney, Francesco Liotti, Alessandro Ruggiero, Elliott Cho, Jeremy Bergman, Erik Walker, Sammy Fine, Timmy Deters, Joseph R. Sicari	
M A Y	13	Layer Cake	Sony Pictures Classics	Matthew Vaughn (director); J.J. Connolly (screenplay); Daniel Craig, Colm Meaney, Kenneth Cranham, George Harris, Jamie Foreman, Sienna Miller, Michael Gambon, Tamer Hassan, Ben Whishaw, Tom Hardy, Dexter Fletcher, Steve John Shepherd, Burn Gorman, Sally Hawkins, Marcel Iureș, Louis Emerick, Stephen Walters, Francis Magee, Dragan Mićanović, Nathalie Lunghi, Jason Flemyng, Matt Ryan, Ivan Kaye, Don McCorkindale, Daniel Moorehead, Paul Orchard	
M A Y	13	Mad Hot Ballroom	Paramount Classics / Nickelodeon Movies	Marilyn Argrelo (director); Madeleine Hackney	
M A Y	13	Mindhunters	Dimension Films / Intermedia Films	Renny Harlin (director); Wayne Kramer, Kevin Brodbin (screenplay); LL Cool J, Jonny Lee Miller, Kathryn Morris, Patricia Velásquez, Clifton Collins Jr., Eion Bailey, Will Kemp, Val Kilmer, Christian Slater, Trevor White, Cassandra Bell, Jasmine Sendar, Anthonie Kamerling, Daniël Boissevain	
M A Y	13	Monster-in-Law	New Line Cinema	Robert Luketic (director); Anya Kochoff (screenplay); Jennifer Lopez, Jane Fonda, Michael Vartan, Wanda Sykes, Adam Scott, Monet Mazur, Annie Parisse, Will Arnett, Elaine Stritch, Stephen Dunham, Randee Heller, Mark Moses, Tomiko Fraser, Jenny Wade, Bruce Gray, Harriet Sansom Harris, Jimmy Jean-Louis, John Aylward	
M A Y	13	Scooby-Doo! in Where's My Mummy?	Warner Home Video / Warner Bros. Animation	Joe Sichta (director/screenplay); Joseph Barbera, George Doty IV, William Hanna, Ed Scharlach, Catherine Trillo, Thommy Wojciechowski (screenplay); Frank Welker, Casey Kasem, Mindy Cohn, Grey DeLisle, Christine Baranski, Ajay Naidu, Ron Perlman, Jeremy Piven, Wynton Marsalis, Oded Fehr, Virginia Madsen	
M A Y	13	Unleashed	Rogue Pictures / EuropaCorp	Louis Leterrier (director); Luc Besson (screenplay); Jet Li, Morgan Freeman, Bob Hoskins, Kerry Condon, Vincent Regan, Tamer Hassan, Scott Adkins, Dylan Brown, Michael Jenn, Mike Ian Lambert	
M A Y	19	Star Wars: Episode III – Revenge of the Sith	20th Century Fox / Lucasfilm	George Lucas (director/screenplay); Ewan McGregor, Natalie Portman, Hayden Christensen, Ian McDiarmid, Samuel L. Jackson, Jimmy Smits, Anthony Daniels, Kenny Baker, Frank Oz, Christopher Lee, Keisha Castle-Hughes, Silas Carson, Jay Laga'aia, Bruce Spence, Wayne Pygram, Temuera Morrison, David Bowers, Oliver Ford Davies, Ahmed Best, Rohan Nichol, Jeremy Bulloch, Amanda Lucas, Matt Sloan, Peter Mayhew, Joel Edgerton, Bonnie Piesse, Katie Lucas, Genevieve O'Reilly, Kee Chan, Rena Owen, Christopher Kirby, Matthew Wood, Rob Coleman, Ben Cooke, Nick Gillard, Roger Guyett, James Earl Jones, John Knoll, Bai Ling, George Lucas	
M A Y	20	Dominion: Prequel to the Exorcist	Warner Bros. Pictures / Morgan Creek Productions	Paul Schrader (director); William Wisher, Caleb Carr (screenplay); Stellan Skarsgård, Gabriel Mann, Clara Bellar, Billy Crawford, Ralph Brown, Julian Wadham, Israel Aduramo, Andrew French, Eddie Osei, Antonie Kamerling, Mary Beth Hurt	
M A Y	27	The Longest Yard	Paramount Pictures / Columbia Pictures / MTV Films / Happy Madison Productions	Peter Segal (director); Sheldon Turner (screenplay); Adam Sandler, Chris Rock, Burt Reynolds, James Cromwell, William Fichtner, Nelly, David Patrick Kelly, Tracy Morgan, Cloris Leachman, Terry Crews, Nicholas Turturro, Bill Goldberg, Bob Sapp, Steve Reevis, Dalip Singh Rana, Joey "Coco" Diaz, Eddie Bunker, Michael Irvin, D12, Bill Romanowski, Brian Bosworth, Kevin Nash, Steve Austin, Michael Papajohn, Conrad Goode, Allen Covert, Rob Schneider, Chris Berman, Jim Rome, Patrick Bristow, Lauren Sanchez, Dan Patrick, Ed Lauter, Sean Salisbury, Rob "Revolution" Moore, Big Boy, Courteney Cox, Lobo Sebastian, Brandon Molale, Todd Holland, Walter Williamson, John Hockridge, Christopher Neiman, Marc S. Ganis, Shane Ralston,	
M A Y	27	Madagascar	DreamWorks Animation / PDI/DreamWorks	Eric Darnell, Tom McGrath (directors/screenplay); Mark Burton, Billy Frolick (screenplay); Ben Stiller, Chris Rock, David Schwimmer, Jada Pinkett Smith, Sacha Baron Cohen, Cedric the Entertainer, Andy Richter, John DiMaggio, Tom McGrath, Chris Miller, Jeffrey Katzenberg, Cody Cameron, Christopher Knights, Conrad Vernon, Eric Darnell, Elisa Gabrielli, Bob Saget, Devika Parikh	
M A Y	27	Saving Face	Sony Pictures Classics / Destination Films	Alice Wu (director/screenplay); Michelle Krusiec, Joan Chen, Lynn Chen, Jin Wang, Guang Lan Koh, Jessica Hecht, Ato Essandoh, Wang Luoyong, Brian Yang,	
J U N E	1	The Sisterhood of the Traveling Pants	Warner Bros. Pictures / Alcon Entertainment	Ken Kwapis (director); Delia Ephron, Elizabeth Chandler (screenplay); Amber Tamblyn, Alexis Bledel, America Ferrera, Blake Lively, Jenna Boyd, Bradley Whitford, Nancy Travis, Rachel Ticotin, Erica Hubbard, Kyle Schmid, Mike Vogel, Michael Rady, Kristie Marsden, Emily Tennant, Leonardo Nam, Maria Konstandarou, George Touliatos	
J U N E	3	Cinderella Man	Universal Pictures / Miramax Films / Imagine Entertainment	Ron Howard (director); Cliff Hollingsworth, Akiva Goldsman (screenplay); Russell Crowe, Renée Zellweger, Paul Giamatti, Craig Bierko, Bruce McGill, Paddy Considine, Connor Price, Rosemarie DeWitt, Linda Kash, Nicholas Campbell, Chuck Shamata, Ron Canada, Troy Amos-Ross, Art Binkowski, Rance Howard, Robert Norman Smith, Angelo Dundee, David Huband, Ariel Waller, Patrick Louis, Gene Pyrz, Alicia Johnston, Mark Simmons, David Litzinger, Matthew G. Taylor	
J U N E	3	Lords of Dogtown	Columbia Pictures / TriStar Pictures	Catherine Hardwicke (director); Stacy Peralta (screenplay); Emile Hirsch, Victor Rasuk, John Robinson, Heath Ledger, Michael Angarano, Nikki Reed, Rebecca De Mornay, William Mapother, Vincent Laresca, Elden Henson, Mitch Hedberg, Stephanie Limb, Mike Ogas, Don Nguyen, Melonie Diaz, Eddie Cahill, Laura Ramsey, Steve Badillo, Pablo Schreiber, America Ferrera, Sofia Vergara, Chelsea Hobbs, Ned Bellamy, Shea Whigham, Johnny Knoxville, Charles Napier, Jay Adams, Tony Alva, Stacy Peralta, Skip Engblom, Tony Hawk, Jeremy Renner, Joel McHale, Alexis Arquette, Bai Ling, Lance Mountain, Craig Stecyk	
J U N E	10	The Adventures of Sharkboy and Lavagirl in 3-D	Dimension Films / Columbia Pictures / Troublemaker Studios	Robert Rodriguez (director/screenplay); Marcel Rodriguez (screenplay); Cayden Boyd, Taylor Lautner, Taylor Dooley, David Arquette, Kristin Davis, George Lopez, Jacob Davich, Sasha Pieterse, Robert Rodriguez	
J U N E	10	The Honeymooners	Paramount Pictures	John Schultz (director); Danny Jacobson, David Sheffield, Barry W. Blaustein, Don Rhymer (screenplay); Cedric the Entertainer, Mike Epps, Gabrielle Union, Regina Hall, Eric Stoltz, Jon Polito, John Leguizamo, Carol Woods, Doreen Keogh, Lenny Venito, Ajay Naidu, Alice Drummond, Kevin Corrigan	
J U N E	10	Mr. & Mrs. Smith	20th Century Fox / Regency Enterprises	Doug Liman (director); Simon Kinberg (screenplay); Brad Pitt, Angelina Jolie, Vince Vaughn, Adam Brody, Kerry Washington, Keith David, Chris Weitz, Michelle Monaghan, Stephanie March, Jennifer Morrison, Perrey Reeves, William Fichtner, Angela Bassett, Rachael Huntley	
J U N E	10	Howl's Moving Castle	Studio Ghibli	Hayao Miyazaki (director/screenplay);Chieko Baisho, Takuya Kimura, Akihiro Miwa, Emily Mortimer, Jean Simmons, Christian Bale, Lauren Bacall	
J U N E	14	Tarzan II	Walt Disney Home Entertainment	Brian Smith (director); Bob Tzudiker, Noni White, Jim Kammerud, Brad Smith (screenplay); Harrison Chad, George Carlin, Brad Garrett, Ron Perlman, Estelle Harris, Glenn Close, Lance Henriksen, Frank Welker, Hamilton Camp, Baron Davis, Iona Morris, Patricia Parris, April Winchell, Tiffany Evans, Mary Matilyn Mouser, Grace Rolek, Brenda Glate, Harrison Fahn, Connor Hutcherson	
J U N E	15	Batman Begins	Warner Bros. Pictures / DC Comics	Christopher Nolan (director/screenplay); David S. Goyer (screenplay); Christian Bale, Michael Caine, Liam Neeson, Katie Holmes, Gary Oldman, Cillian Murphy, Tom Wilkinson, Rutger Hauer, Ken Watanabe, Morgan Freeman, Mark Boone Junior, Linus Roache, Rade Šerbedžija, Larry Holden, Colin McFarlane, Gus Lewis, Emma Lockhart, Christine Adams, Vincent Wong, Sara Stewart, Richard Brake, Gerard Murphy, John Nolan, Karen David, Tamer Hassan, Tom Wu, Jamie Cho, Jo Martin, Lucy Russell, Charles Edwards, Karl Shiels, Stephen Walters, Tim Booth, Risteárd Cooper, Andrew Pleavin, Shane Rimmer, Jeremy Theobald, Alexandra Bastedo, Jack Gleeson, Roger Yuan, John Foo, Joey Ansah, Spencer Wilding, Mark Smith, Dave Legeno, Khan Bonfils, Dominic Burgess, T. J. Ramini, Rick Avery, Jimmy Star, Mark Strange, Grant Guirey, Rodney Ryan, Dean Alexandrou	
J U N E	17	The Perfect Man	Universal Pictures	Mark Rosman (director); Gina Wendkos (screenplay); Hilary Duff, Heather Locklear, Chris Noth, Ben Feldman, Vanessa Lengies, Mike O'Malley, Caroline Rhea, Kym Whitley, Aria Wallace, Carson Kressley, Michelle Nolden, Gerry Mendicino, James McGowan, Philip Akin, Jeff Lumby, Monique Mojica, Amelia Winchester	
J U N E	22	Herbie: Fully Loaded	Walt Disney Pictures	Angela Robinson (director); Thomas Lennon, Robert Ben Garant, Alfred Gough, Miles Millar (screenplay); Lindsay Lohan, Justin Long, Breckin Meyer, Cheryl Hines, Matt Dillon, Michael Keaton, Thomas Lennon, Jimmi Simpson, Jill Ritchie, Jeremy Roberts, Monica Manning, Allen Bestwick, Benny Parsons, Stuart Scott	
J U N E	24	Bewitched	Columbia Pictures / Red Wagon Entertainment	Nora Ephron (director/screenplay); Delia Ephron (screenplay); Nicole Kidman, Will Ferrell, Shirley MacLaine, Michael Caine, Jason Schwartzman, Kristin Chenoweth, Heather Burns, Jim Turner, Stephen Colbert, David Alan Grier, Michael Badalucco, Katie Finneran, Carole Shelley, Steve Carell, Amy Sedaris, Richard Kind, Elizabeth Montgomery, Dick York, Agnes Moorehead, Paul Lynde, Ed McMahon, Conan O'Brien, James Lipton, Nick Lachey, Kate Walsh, Abbey McBride	
J U N E	24	Land of the Dead	Universal Pictures / Atmosphere Pictures	George A. Romero (director/screenplay); Simon Baker, John Leguizamo, Dennis Hopper, Asia Argento, Robert Joy, Eugene Clark, Joanne Boland, Tony Nappo, Jennifer Baxter, Boyd Banks, Jasmin Geljo, Maxwell McCabe-Lokos, Tony Munch, Shawn Roberts, Pedro Miguel Arce, Sasha Roiz, Krista Bridges, Bruce McFee, Phil Fondacaro, Alan van Sprang, Earl Pastko, Peter Outerbridge, Gene Mack, Devon Bostick, Simon Pegg, Edgar Wright, Tom Savini, Gregory Nicotero	
J U N E	24	Yes	Sony Pictures Classics	Sally Potter (director/screenplay); Joan Allen, Simon Abkarian, Sam Neill, Gary Lewis, Shirley Henderson, Wil Johnson, Raymond Waring, Stephanie Leonidas, Samantha Bond, Kev Orkian, Sheila Hancock, Lol Coxhill	
J U N E	29	War of the Worlds	Paramount Pictures / DreamWorks Pictures / Amblin Entertainment / Cruise/Wagner Productions	Steven Spielberg (director); Josh Friedman, David Koepp (screenplay); Tom Cruise, Dakota Fanning, Miranda Otto, Justin Chatwin, Tim Robbins, Rick Gonzalez, Yul Vazquez, Lenny Venito, Lisa Ann Walter, Ann Robinson, Gene Barry, David Alan Basche, Roz Abrams, Camillia Sanes, Amy Ryan, Danny Hoch, Morgan Freeman, Columbus Short, Channing Tatum, Dee Bradley Baker	

== July–September ==
Opening		Title	Production company	Cast and crew	Ref.
J U L Y	1	Rebound	20th Century Fox	Steve Carr (director); Jon Lucas, Scott Moore (screenplay); Martin Lawrence, Wendy Raquel Robinson, Breckin Meyer, Horatio Sanz, Katt Williams, Oren Williams, Patrick Warburton, Megan Mullally, Eddy Martin, Steven C. Parker, Steven Anthony Lawrence, Logan McElroy, Gus Hoffman, Tara Correa, Alia Shawkat, Amy Bruckner, Beau Billingslea, Cody Linley, Fred Stoller, Robert Rusler	
J U L Y	8	Dark Water	Touchstone Pictures	Walter Salles (director); Rafael Yglesias (screenplay); Jennifer Connelly, John C. Reilly, Tim Roth, Dougray Scott, Pete Postlethwaite, Camryn Manheim, Ariel Gade, Perla Haney-Jardine	
J U L Y	8	Fantastic Four	20th Century Fox / Marvel Enterprises	Tim Story (director); Mark Frost, Michael France (screenplay); Ioan Gruffudd, Jessica Alba, Chris Evans, Michael Chiklis, Julian McMahon, Kerry Washington, Laurie Holden, Hamish Linklater, Kevin McNulty, Maria Menounos, Michael Kopsa, Stan Lee, Terry David Mulligan, Ben Mulroney, Lauren Sanchez, Kenny Bartram, Brian Deegan, Jamie Little	
J U L Y	15	Charlie and the Chocolate Factory	Warner Bros. Pictures / Village Roadshow Pictures / Plan B Entertainment	Tim Burton (director); John August (screenplay); Johnny Depp, Freddie Highmore, David Kelly, Helena Bonham Carter, Noah Taylor, Missi Pyle, James Fox, Adam Godley, Franziska Troegner, Deep Roy, Christopher Lee, AnnaSophia Robb, Julia Winter, Jordan Fry, Philip Wiegratz, Blair Dunlop, Liz Smith, Eileen Essell, David Morris, Nitin Ganatra, Shelley Conn, Geoffrey Holder, Todd Boyce, Nayef Rashed, Garrick Hagon, Kevin Eldon, Mark Heap, Annette Badland, Brigitte Millar, Jack Angel, Greg Berg, Bob Bergen, Rodger Bumpass, Jennifer Darling, Debi Derryberry, Danny Elfman, Bill Farmer, Donald Fullilove, Teresa Ganzel, Sherry Lynn, Mona Marshall, Ryan O'Donohue, Patrick Pinney, Phil Proctor, Jan Rabson, Danny Mann, Mickie McGowan	
J U L Y	15	Wedding Crashers	New Line Cinema / Tapestry Films	David Dobkin (director); Steve Faber, Bob Fisher (screenplay); Owen Wilson, Vince Vaughn, Christopher Walken, Rachel McAdams, Isla Fisher, Bradley Cooper, Jane Seymour, Ellen Albertini Dow, Keir O'Donnell, Henry Gibson, Ron Canada, Dwight Yoakam, Rebecca De Mornay, David Conrad, Jenny Alden, Geoff Stults, Larry Joe Campbell, Kathryn Joosten, Will Ferrell, Richard Riehle, John McCain, James Carville	
J U L Y	22	Bad News Bears	Paramount Pictures	Richard Linklater (director); Bill Lancaster, Glenn Ficarra, John Requa (screenplay); Billy Bob Thornton, Greg Kinnear, Marcia Gay Harden, Ridge Canipe, Troy Gentile, Tyler Patrick Jones, Sammi Kane Kraft, Arabella Holzbog, Carter Jenkins, Brandon Craggs, Jeffrey Davies, Timmy Deters, Carlos Estrada, Emmanuel Estrada, Kenneth "K.C." Harris, Aman Johal, Jeffrey Tedmori	
J U L Y	22	The Devil's Rejects	Lions Gate Films	Rob Zombie (director/screenplay); Sid Haig, Bill Moseley, Sheri Moon Zombie, Ken Foree, Matthew McGrory, Leslie Easterbrook, Priscilla Barnes, William Forsythe, Dave Sheridan, E.G. Daily, Geoffrey Lewis, Kate Norby, Lew Temple, Danny Trejo, Diamond Dallas Page, Brian Posehn, Ginger Lynn Allen, Tom Towles, Michael Berryman, P.J. Soles, Deborah Van Valkenburgh, Jossara Jinaro, Chris Ellis, Mary Woronov, Daniel Roebuck, Duane Whitaker, Tyler Mane, Jordan Orr, Robert Trebor, Kane Hodder	
J U L Y	22	Hustle & Flow	Paramount Classics / MTV Films / New Deal Entertainment	Craig Brewster (director/screenplay); Terrence Howard, Anthony Anderson, Taryn Manning, Taraji P. Henson, Paula Jai Parker, Elise Neal, Isaac Hayes, D.J. Qualls, Ludacris, Juicy J, Haystak, DJ Paul, I-20, Josey Scott, Al Kapone, William 'Poon' Engram, Claude Phillips	
J U L Y	22	The Island	DreamWorks Pictures / Warner Bros. Pictures / Parkes/MacDonald Productions	Michael Bay (director); Caspian Tredwell-Owen, Alex Kurtzman, Roberto Orci (screenplay); Ewan McGregor, Scarlett Johansson, Djimon Hounsou, Sean Bean, Michael Clarke Duncan, Steve Buscemi, Kim Coates, Ethan Phillips, Noa Tishby, Max Baker, Brian Stepanek, Siobhan Flynn, Phil Abrams	
J U L Y	22	Last Days	Picturehouse / HBO Films	Gus Van Sant (director/screenplay); Michael Pitt, Lukas Haas, Asia Argento, Ricky Jay, Harmony Korine, Rodrigo Lopresti, Kim Gordon, Scott Patrick Green, Nicole Vicius, Ryan Orion, Adam Friberg, Andy Friberg	
J U L Y	22	March of the Penguins	Warner Independent Pictures / Wild Bunch / National Geographic Films	Luc Jacquet (director); Morgan Roberts (screenplay); Morgan Freeman	
J U L Y	22	November	Sony Pictures Classics	Greg Harrison (director/screenplay); Benjamin Brand (screenplay); Courteney Cox, James LeGros, Michael Ealy, Nora Dunn, Anne Archer, Nick Offerman, Brittany Ishibashi, Matthew Carey	
J U L Y	29	Must Love Dogs	Warner Bros. Pictures	Gary David Goldberg (director/screenplay); John Cusack, Diane Lane, Dermot Mulroney, Elizabeth Perkins, Stockard Channing, Christopher Plummer, Brad William Henke, Colin Egglesfield, Ali Hillis, Victor Webster, Julie Gonzalo, Jordana Spiro, Glenn Howerton, Michael Spound	
J U L Y	29	Sky High	Walt Disney Pictures	Mike Mitchell (director); Paul Hernandez, Bob Schooley, Mark McCorkle (screenplay); Michael Angarano, Kurt Russell, Kelly Preston, Danielle Panabaker, Mary Elizabeth Winstead, Patrick Warburton, Steven Strait, Lynda Carter, Bruce Campbell, Dave Foley, Cloris Leachman, Kevin McDonald, Dee Jay Daniels, Nicholas Braun, Malika Haqq, Jake Sandvig, Kevin Heffernan, Jim Rash, Kim Rhodes, Tom Kenny, Jill Talley, Will Harris, Kelly Vitz, Loren Berman, Dustin Ingram, Nicole Malgarini	
J U L Y	29	Stealth	Columbia Pictures	Rob Cohen (director/screenplay); W.D. Richter (screenplay); Josh Lucas, Jessica Biel, Jamie Foxx, Sam Shepard, Joe Morton, Richard Roxburgh, Ebon Moss-Bachrach, David Andrews, Wentworth Miller	
A U G U S T	5	Broken Flowers	Focus Features	Jim Jarmusch (director/screenplay); Bill Murray, Jeffrey Wright, Sharon Stone, Frances Conroy, Jessica Lange, Tilda Swinton, Julie Delpy, Mark Webber, Chloë Sevigny, Christopher McDonald, Alexis Dziena, Larry Fessenden, Chris Bauer, Pell James, Heather Alicia Simms, Brea Frazier, Ryan Donowho	
A U G U S T	5	The Chumscrubber	Go Fish Pictures	Arie Posin (director); Zac Stanford (screenplay); Jamie Bell, Camilla Belle, Justin Chatwin, William Fichtner, Allison Janney, Ralph Fiennes, Glenn Close, Lou Taylor Pucci, Rory Culkin, Thomas Curtis, John Heard, Josh Janowicz, Carrie-Anne Moss, Rita Wilson, Tim DeKay, Caroline Goodall, Lauren Holly, Jason Isaacs, Eric Jungmann, Jeffrey Vincent Parise, Max Van Ville	
A U G U S T	5	The Dukes of Hazzard	Warner Bros. Pictures / Village Roadshow Pictures	Jay Chandrasekhar (director); John O'Brien (screenplay); Johnny Knoxville, Seann William Scott, Jessica Simpson, Burt Reynolds, Willie Nelson, M.C. Gainey, Joe Don Baker, Lynda Carter, David Koechner, Michael Weston, James Roday, Kevin Heffernan, Jacqui Maxwell, Alice Greczyn, Junior Brown, Barry Corbin, Andrew Prine, Steve Lemme, Jay Chandrasekhar, Erik Stolhanske, Paul Soter, Charlie Finn, A.J. Foyt IV, Rip Taylor, Nikki Griffin, Brendan Schetter	
A U G U S T	5	Junebug	Sony Pictures Classics	Phil Morrison (director); Angus MacLachlan (screenplay); Embeth Davidtz, Amy Adams, Ben McKenzie, Celia Weston, Alessandro Nivola, Scott Wilson, Jill Wagner, Frank Hoyt Taylor, Joanne Pankow, Alicia Van Couvering	
A U G U S T	12	Deuce Bigalow: European Gigolo	Columbia Pictures / Happy Madison Productions	Mike Bigelow (director); Rob Schneider, David Garrett, Jason Ward (screenplay); Rob Schneider, Eddie Griffin, Jeroen Krabbé, Til Schweiger, Hanna Verboom, Douglas Sills, Charles Keating, Carlos Ponce, Rachel Stevens, Alex Dimitriades, Kostas Sommer, Miranda Raison, Oded Fehr, Zoe Telford, Vincent Martella, Bobbi Sue Luther, Dana Goodman, Skytriss, Julia Lea Wolov, Kelly Brook, Daan Schuurmans, Alex Zane, Johnny Vaughan, Norm MacDonald, Arija Bareikis, Adam Sandler, Elisabetta Canalis, Wes Takahashi	
A U G U S T	12	Four Brothers	Paramount Pictures	John Singleton (director); David Elliot, Paul Lovett (screenplay); Mark Wahlberg, Tyrese Gibson, André Benjamin, Garrett Hedlund, Terrence Howard, Josh Charles, Sofía Vergara, Chiwetel Ejiofor, Fionnula Flanagan, Taraji P. Henson, Kenneth Welsh, Barry Shabaka Henley, Lyriq Bent, Adam Beach, Tony Nappo, Shawn Singleton, Richard Chevolleau, Mpho Koaho, Kevin Duhaney, Benz Antoine, Jernard Burks, Reiya West Downs, Riele West Downs	
A U G U S T	12	The Great Raid	Miramax Films	John Dahl (director); Carlo Bernard, Doug Miro (screenplay); Benjamin Bratt, James Franco, Connie Nielsen, Marton Csokas, Joseph Fiennes, Mark Consuelos, Max Martini, Logan Marshall-Green, Robert Mammone, Cesar Montano, James Carpinello, Clayne Crawford, Craig McLachlan, Sam Worthington, Kenny Doughty, Natalie Mendoza, Paolo Montalban, Masa Yamaguchi, Paul Nakauchi, Laird Macintosh, Jeremy Callaghan, Dale Dye, Brett Tucker, Eugenia Yuan	
A U G U S T	12	Pretty Persuasion	Samuel Goldwyn Films / Roadside Attractions / Ren-Mar Studios / Prospect Pictures	Marcos Siega (director); Skander Halim (screenplay); Evan Rachel Wood, Ron Livingston, James Woods, Jane Krakowski, Elisabeth Harnois, Danny Comden, Michael Hitchcock, Adi Schnall, Stark Sands, Jaime King, Josh Zuckerman, James Snyder, Cody McMains, Selma Blair, Clyde Kusatsu, Robert Joy, Octavia Spencer, Mike Erwin, Johnny Lewis, Alex Désert, Tina Holmes, Christopher Thornton, Navid Negahban, Veena Bidasha	
A U G U S T	12	The Skeleton Key	Universal Pictures	Iain Softley (director); Ehren Kruger (screenplay); Kate Hudson, Gena Rowlands, Peter Sarsgaard, Joy Bryant, John Hurt, Jeryl Prescott, Forrest Landis, Ronald McCall	
A U G U S T	17	Supercross	20th Century Fox	Steve Boyum (director); Ken Solarz, Bart Baker (screenplay); Steve Howey, Mike Vogel, Cameron Richardson, Sophia Bush, Aaron Carter, Channing Tatum, Robert Patrick, Robert Carradine, J.D. Pardo, Jamie Little, Ricky Carmichael, Kevin Windham	
A U G U S T	19	The 40-Year-Old Virgin	Universal Pictures	Judd Apatow (director/screenplay); Steve Carell (screenplay); Steve Carell, Catherine Keener, Paul Rudd, Romany Malco, Seth Rogen, Elizabeth Banks, Leslie Mann, Jane Lynch, Kat Dennings, Gerry Bednob, Shelley Malil, Jonah Hill, Kevin Hart, Wayne Federman, Mindy Kaling, Gillian Vigman, Kimberly Page, Stormy Daniels, Nancy Walls, Cedric Yarbrough, David Koechner, Steve Bannos, Jenna Fischer, Marika Domińczyk, Mo Collins, Siena Goines, Jeff Kahn, Nick Lashaway, Jordan Masterson, Jazzmun, Lee Weaver, Brianna Brown, Hilary Shepard, Barret Swatek, Carla Gallo, Joe Nunez, Marisa Guterman, Rose Abdoo, Loudon Wainwright III	
A U G U S T	19	The Proud Family Movie	Buena Vista Television	Bruce W. Smith (director); Calvin Brown Jr., Ralph Farquhar, John Patrick White, Stiles White (screenplay); Kyla Pratt, Tommy Davidson, Paula Jai Parker, Jo Marie Payton, Tara Strong, Orlando Brown, Jeff Bennett, Soleil Moon Frye, Alisa Reyes, Karen Malina White, Omarion, LisaRaye McCoy, Arsenio Hall, Jeremy Suarez, Carlos Alazraqui, Billy West, Carlos Mencia, Maria Canals-Barrera, Phil LaMarr, Aries Spears, Keith David, Kevin Michael Richardson, Masi Oka, Raquel Lee, Big Boy, Patricia Belcher, Alvaro Guttierez, Christian Mills, Michele Lisette Jennings	
A U G U S T	19	Red Eye	DreamWorks Pictures	Wes Craven (director); Carl Ellsworth (screenplay); Rachel McAdams, Cillian Murphy, Brian Cox, Jayma Mays, Jack Scalia, Robert Pine, Angela Paton, Suzie Plakson, Laura Johnson, Loren Lester, Max Kasch, Kyle Gallner, Beth Toussaint, Colby Donaldson, Marc Macaulay, Jenny Wade, Chris Bender, Wes Craven, Marianne Maddalena, Teresa Press-Marx, Brittany Oaks	
A U G U S T	19	Valiant	Walt Disney Pictures / Ealing Studios / Vanguard Animation	Gary Chapman (director); Jordan Katz, George Webster, George Melrod (screenplay); Ewan McGregor, Ricky Gervais, Jim Broadbent, Tim Curry, Hugh Laurie, John Cleese, John Hurt, Pip Torrens, Rik Mayall, Olivia Williams, Dan Roberts, Brian Lonsdale, Annette Badland, Michael Schlingmann, Sharon Horgan, Buckley Collum, Sean Samuels, Jonathan Ross, Mike Harbour	
A U G U S T	26	The Baxter	IFC Films	Michael Showalter (director/screenplay); Michael Showalter, Elizabeth Banks, Justin Theroux, Michelle Williams, Michael Ian Black, Zak Orth, Peter Dinklage, Catherine Lloyd Burns, Paul Rudd, Haviland Morris, David Wain, A.D. Miles, Joe Lo Truglio, Seth Herzog, Jonathan Marc Sherman, Leslie Lyles, Donna Mitchell, Sarah Drew, Marylouise Burke, Ken Marino, Audrie Neenan, Michael Portnoy, Jack McBrayer, Matt Mercer, Andrea Rosen, Katharine Powell, Jim DeMarse, Jon DeVries	
A U G U S T	26	The Brothers Grimm	Dimension Films / Metro-Goldwyn-Mayer / Mosaic Media Group	Terry Gilliam (director); Ehren Kruger (screenplay); Matt Damon, Heath Ledger, Peter Stormare, Lena Headey, Jonathan Pryce, Monica Bellucci, Tomáš Hanák, Julian Bleach, Mackenzie Crook, Richard Ridings, Roger Ashton-Griffiths, Anna Rust	
A U G U S T	26	The Cave	Screen Gems / Lakeshore Entertainment	Bruce Hunt (director); Michael Steinberg, Tegan West (screenplay); Cole Hauser, Eddie Cibrian, Morris Chestnut, Rick Ravanello, Daniel Dae Kim, Marcel Iureș, Lena Headey, Piper Perabo, Kieran Darcy-Smith, Vlad Rădescu	
A U G U S T	26	Undiscovered	Lions Gate Films / Lakeshore Entertainment / Cinerenta	Meiert Avis (director); John Galt (screenplay); Pell James, Steven Strait, Kip Pardue, Shannyn Sossamon, Carrie Fisher, Peter Weller, Fisher Stevens, Ashlee Simpson, Perrey Reeves, Stephen Moyer, Ewan Chung	
A U G U S T	30	Lilo & Stitch 2: Stitch Has a Glitch	Walt Disney Home Entertainment	Michael LaBash, Tony Leondis (directors/screenplay); Eddie Guzelian, Alexa Junge (screenplay); Chris Sanders, Dakota Fanning, Tia Carrere, David Ogden Stiers, Kevin McDonald, Jason Scott Lee, Holliston Coleman, Liliana Mumy, Paul Vogt, Matt Corboy, Jennifer Hale, Emily Osment, Grace Rolek, Kunewa Mook, Jillian Henry, William J. Caparella	
A U G U S T	31	The Constant Gardener	Focus Features	Fernando Meirelles (director); Jeffrey Caine (screenplay); Ralph Fiennes, Rachel Weisz, Danny Huston, Bill Nighy, Pete Postlethwaite, Hubert Koundé, Archie Panjabi, Gerard McSorley, Donald Sumpter, Richard McCabe, Juliet Aubrey, Nick Reding	
S E P T E M B E R	2	A Sound of Thunder	Warner Bros. Pictures / Franchise Pictures	Peter Hyams (director); Thomas Dean Donnelly, Joshua Oppenheimer, Gregory Poirier (screenplay); Edward Burns, Catherine McCormack, Ben Kingsley, David Oyelowo, Jemima Rooper, Wilfried Hochholdinger, August Zirner, Corey Johnson, Heike Makatsch, Armin Rohde, William Armstrong	
S E P T E M B E R	2	Transporter 2	20th Century Fox / Current Entertainment / EuropaCorp	Louis Leterrier (director); Luc Besson, Robert Mark Kamen (screenplay); Jason Statham, Alessandro Gassmann, Amber Valletta, Kate Nauta, François Berléand, Matthew Modine, Jason Flemyng, Keith David, Shannon Briggs, Jeff Chase, Marc Macaulay, Jim Coleman, AnnaLynne McCord, Hunter Clary	
S E P T E M B E R	2	Underclassman	Miramax Films / Tapestry Films	Marcos Siega (director); David T, Wagner, Brent Goldberg (screenplay); Nick Cannon, Shawn Ashmore, Roselyn Sánchez, Kelly Hu, Hugh Bonneville, Cheech Marin, Ian Gomez, Johnny Lewis, Don McManus, Mary Pat Gleason, Kaylee DeFer, Peter Bryant, Sam Easton, Terry Chen, Jamie Kaler, Ben Cotton, Zak Santiago, Dan Shea, Sarah Jane Morris, Angelo Spizzirri, Vishiss, Adrian Young	
S E P T E M B E R	7	Thumbsucker	Sony Pictures Classics / Bob Yari Productions	Mike Mills (director/screenplay); Lou Taylor Pucci, Tilda Swinton, Vincent D'Onofrio, Keanu Reeves, Benjamin Bratt, Kelli Garner, Vince Vaughn, Chase Offerle, Kit Koenig, Nancy O'Dell, Walter Kirn	
S E P T E M B E R	9	The Exorcism of Emily Rose	Screen Gems / Lakeshore Entertainment	Scott Derrickson (director/screenplay); Paul Harris Boardman (screenplay); Laura Linney, Tom Wilkinson, Campbell Scott, Colm Feore, Jennifer Carpenter, Mary Beth Hurt, Henry Czerny, Shohreh Aghdashloo, J.R. Bourne, Kenneth Welsh, Joshua Close, Duncan Fraser, Mary Black, Andrew Wheeler, Katie Keating	
S E P T E M B E R	9	Keane	Magnolia Pictures	Lodge Kerrigan (director/screenplay); Damian Lewis, Abigail Breslin, Amy Ryan, Christopher Evan Welch, Tina Holmes, Liza Colón-Zayas, John Tormey, Chris Bauer, Stephen Henderson	
S E P T E M B E R	9	The Man	New Line Cinema	Les Mayfield (director); Jim Piddock, Margaret Oberman, Steve Carpenter (screenplay); Samuel L. Jackson, Eugene Levy, Miguel Ferrer, Luke Goss, Susie Essman, Anthony Mackie, Gigi Rice, Rachael Crawford, Philip Akin, Horatio Sanz, Nestor Serrano	
S E P T E M B E R	9	An Unfinished Life	Miramax Films / Revolution Studios	Lasse Hallström (director); Mark Spragg, Virginia Korus Spragg (screenplay); Robert Redford, Jennifer Lopez, Morgan Freeman, Josh Lucas, Camryn Manheim, Lynda Boyd, Damian Lewis, Becca Gardner, Trevor Moss, Bart the Bear 2	
S E P T E M B E R	9	Green Street Hooligans	OddLot Entertainment	Lexi Alexander (director/screenplay); Dougie Brimson, Josh Shelov (screenplay); Elijah Wood, Charlie Hunnam, Claire Forlani, Marc Warren, Leo Gregory	
S E P T E M B E R	16	Cry Wolf	Rogue Pictures	Jeff Wadlow (director/screenplay); Beau Bauman (screenplay); Julian Morris, Lindy Booth, Jared Padalecki, Jon Bon Jovi, Paul James, Sandra McCoy, Ethan Cohn, Kristy Wu, Anna Deavere Smith, Gary Cole, Jesse Janzen, Erica Yates, Jane Beard, Ashley Davis	
S E P T E M B E R	16	Everything Is Illuminated	Warner Independent Pictures / Deep River Productions / Big Beach / Stillking Films / Cinetic Media	Liev Schreiber (director/screenplay); Elijah Wood, Boris Leskin, Eugene Hütz, Laryssa Lauret, Jonathan Safran Foer	
S E P T E M B E R	16	Just Like Heaven	DreamWorks Pictures	Mark Waters (director); Peter Tolan, Leslie Dixon (screenplay); Reese Witherspoon, Mark Ruffalo, Jon Heder, Donal Logue, Dina Waters, Ben Shenkman, Ivana Miličević, Caroline Aaron, Rosalind Chao, Ron Canada, Willie Garson, Billy Beck, Catherine Taber, Kerris Dorsey, Alyssa Shafer, Raymond O'Connor, Lucille Soong, Joel McKinnon Miller, Victor Yerrid	
S E P T E M B E R	16	Lord of War	Lions Gate Films / Entertainment Manufacturing Company / Saturn Films	Andrew Niccol (director/screenplay); Nicolas Cage, Jared Leto, Bridget Moynahan, Ian Holm, Ethan Hawke, Nalu Tripician, Eamonn Walker, Tanit Phoenix, Donald Sutherland, Weston Coppola Cage, Sammi Rotibi, Eugene Lazarev, Kobus Marx, Liya Kebede, Jasmine Sais Burgess	
S E P T E M B E R	16	Proof	Miramax Films	John Madden (director); Rebecca Miller, David Auburn (screenplay); Gwyneth Paltrow, Anthony Hopkins, Jake Gyllenhaal, Hope Davis	
S E P T E M B E R	16	Venom	Dimension Films / Outerbanks Entertainment	Jim Gillespie (director); Flint Dille, John Zuur Platten, Brandon Boyce (screenplay); Agnes Bruckner, Jonathan Jackson, Laura Ramsey, D.J. Cotrona, Rick Cramer, Meagan Good, Bijou Phillips, Method Man, Pawel Szajda, Davetta Sherwood, Stacey Travis	
S E P T E M B E R	23	Corpse Bride	Warner Bros. Pictures	Tim Burton, Mike Johnson (directors); John August, Caroline Thompson, Pamela Pettler (screenplay); Johnny Depp, Helena Bonham Carter, Emily Watson, Tracey Ullman, Paul Whitehouse, Joanna Lumley, Albert Finney, Richard E. Grant, Christopher Lee, Michael Gough, Jane Horrocks, Enn Reitel, Deep Roy, Danny Elfman, Stephen Ballantyne	
S E P T E M B E R	23	Dirty Love	First Look Studios	John Mallory Asher (director); Jenny McCarthy (screenplay); Jenny McCarthy, Eddie Kaye Thomas, Carmen Electra, Kam Heskin, Victor Webster, Deryck Whibley, Guillermo Díaz, Jessica Collins, Noah Harpster, Jay Johnston, Bob Glouberman, Lochlyn Munro, Kathy Griffin, Brian George, Amy McCarthy, Jonathan Torrens, Roger Perry, Joyce Bulifant, Sum 41	
S E P T E M B E R	23	Flightplan	Touchstone Pictures / Imagine Entertainment	Robert Schwentke (director); Peter A. Dowling, Billy Ray (screenplay); Jodie Foster, Peter Sarsgaard, Erika Christensen, Sean Bean, Marlene Lawston, Kate Beahan, Matt Bomer, Amanda Brooks, Jesse Burch, Assaf Cohen, Shane Edelman, David Farkas, Stephanie Faracy, Mary Gallagher, Christopher Gartin, Lois Hall, John Benjamin Hickey, Michael Irby, Jana Kolesarova, Forrest Landis, Haley Ramm, Greta Scacchi, Judith Scott, Brent Sexton, Fred Tungulsten, Kirk B.R. Woller	
S E P T E M B E R	23	Roll Bounce	Fox Searchlight Pictures	Malcolm D. Lee (director); Norman Vance Jr. (screenplay); Bow Wow, Chi McBride, Mike Epps, Wesley Jonathan, Meagan Good, Nick Cannon, Kellita Smith, Khleo Thomas, Jurnee Smollett, Marcus T. Paulk, Brandon T. Jackson, Rick Gonzalez, Paul Wesley, Wayne Brady, Charlie Murphy, Darryl McDaniels	
S E P T E M B E R	30	Capote	Sony Pictures Classics / United Artists	Bennett Miller (director); Dan Futterman (screenplay); Philip Seymour Hoffman, Catherine Keener, Clifton Collins Jr., Bruce Greenwood, Bob Balaban, Mark Pellegrino, Chris Cooper, Katherine Shindle, Amy Ryan, Allie Mickelson, Marshall Bell, Araby Lockhart, R.D. Reid, Rob McLaughlin, Harry Nelken, C. Ernst Harth	
S E P T E M B E R	30	The Greatest Game Ever Played	Walt Disney Pictures	Bill Paxton (director); Mark Frost (screenplay); Shia LaBeouf, Stephen Dillane, Peter Firth, Elias Koteas, Luke Askew, Josh Flitter, Peyton List, Marnie McPhail, Len Cariou, Michael Sinelnikoff, Stephen Marcus, Max Kasch, Mike 'Nug' Nahrgang, Walter Massey, Justin Ashforth	
S E P T E M B E R	30	A History of Violence	New Line Cinema	David Cronenberg (director); Josh Olson (screenplay); Viggo Mortensen, Maria Bello, Ed Harris, William Hurt, Ashton Holmes, Peter MacNeill, Stephen McHattie, Greg Bryk, Kyle Schmid, Aidan Devine, R.D. Reid, Morgan Kelly, Sumela Kay, Gerry Quigley, Deborah Drakeford, Heidi Hayes, Bill McDonald, Michelle McCree, Ian Matthews	
S E P T E M B E R	30	Into the Blue	Metro-Goldwyn-Mayer / Columbia Pictures / Mandalay Pictures	John Stockwell (director); Matt Johnson (screenplay); Paul Walker, Jessica Alba, Scott Caan, Ashley Scott, Josh Brolin, James Frain, Tyson Beckford, Dwayne Adway, Javon Frazer	
S E P T E M B E R	30	Little Manhattan	20th Century Fox / Regency Enterprises	Mark Levin (director); Jennifer Flackett (screenplay); Josh Hutcherson, Charlie Ray, Bradley Whitford, Cynthia Nixon, Willie Garson, Tonye Patano, Josh Pais, John Dossett, Talia Balsam, Jonah Meyerson, Mike Chat, Anthony Laflamme, Nick Cubbler, Neil Jay Shastri, Connor Hutcherson	
S E P T E M B E R	30	Serenity	Universal Pictures	Joss Whedon (director/screenplay); Nathan Fillion, Alan Tudyk, Adam Baldwin, Summer Glau, Gina Torres, Morena Baccarin, Jewel Staite, Chiwetel Ejiofor, Sean Maher, Ron Glass, David Krumholtz, Michael Hitchcock, Sarah Paulson, Yan Feldman, Rafael Feldman	

== October–December ==
Opening		Title	Production company	Cast and crew	Ref.
O C T O B E R	5	The Squid and the Whale	Samuel Goldwyn Films / Sony Pictures Home Entertainment	Noah Baumbach (director/screenplay); Jeff Daniels, Laura Linney, Jesse Eisenberg, Owen Kline, Anna Paquin, William Baldwin, Halley Feiffer, Ken Leung, Greta Kline, Maryann Plunkett, Alexandra Daddario, David Benger, Adam Rose, Peter Newman, Peggy Gormley	
O C T O B E R	7	The Gospel	Screen Gems / Rainforest Films	Rob Hardy (director/screenplay); Boris Kodjoe, Idris Elba, Clifton Powell, Nona Gaye, Omar Gooding, Tamyra Gray, China Anne McClain, Donnie McClurkin, Aloma Wright, Keshia Knight Pulliam, Sierra Aylina McClain, Lauryn Alisa McClain, Hezekiah Walker, Michael J. Pagan, Yolanda Adams, Martha Munizzi, Fred Hammond, Kirk Franklin	
O C T O B E R	7	Wallace & Gromit: The Curse of the Were-Rabbit	DreamWorks Animation / Aardman Animations	Steve Box, Nick Park (directors/screenplay); Mark Burton, Bob Baker (screenplay); Peter Sallis, Ralph Fiennes, Helena Bonham Carter, Peter Kay, Nicholas Smith, Dicken Ashworth, Liz Smith, Edward Kelsey, Geraldine McEwan	
O C T O B E R	7	In Her Shoes	20th Century Fox / Scott Free Productions	Curtis Hanson (director); Susannah Grant (screenplay); Cameron Diaz, Toni Collette, Shirley MacLaine, Mark Feuerstein, Ken Howard, Brooke Smith, Candice Azzara, Richard Burgi, Anson Mount, Eric Balfour, Francine Beers, Alan Blumenfeld, Andy Powers, Ivana Miličević, Norman Lloyd, Benton Jennings, Jennifer Weiner	
O C T O B E R	7	Two for the Money	Universal Pictures / Morgan Creek Productions	D. J. Caruso (director); Dan Gilroy (screenplay); Al Pacino, Matthew McConaughey, Rene Russo, Armand Assante, Carly Pope, Jeremy Piven, Jaime King, Ralph Garman, Charles Carroll, Kevin Chapman, Gedde Watanabe, Craig Veroni, Denise Galik, Gary Hudson, Jeremy Guilbaut, Michael Rogers, Veena Sood, Adrian Holmes, Louis Mustillo, Luciana Carro, David Lovgren, Barry LeBrock, Ron Pitts, Jim Rome, Jarrod Bunch, Mazio Royster, April Telek, Susan Ward, Tyler James Williams	
O C T O B E R	7	Waiting...	Lions Gate Films	Rob McKittrick (director/screenplay); Ryan Reynolds, Anna Faris, Justin Long, David Koechner, John Francis Daley, Alanna Ubach, Kaitlin Doubleday, Chi McBride, Luis Guzmán, Rob Benedict, Vanessa Lengies, Max Kasch, Andy Milonakis, Dane Cook, Jordan Ladd, Emmanuelle Chriqui, Wendie Malick, Skyler Stone	
O C T O B E R	14	Domino	New Line Cinema / Scott Free Productions / Davis Films	Tony Scott (director); Richard Kelly (screenplay); Keira Knightley, Mickey Rourke, Edgar Ramirez, Delroy Lindo, Mo'Nique, Mena Suvari, Lucy Liu, Christopher Walken, Dabney Coleman, Macy Gray, Jacqueline Bisset, Stanley Kamel, Kel O'Neill, Peter Jacobson, Dale Dickey, Lew Temple, Fred Koehler, Charles Paraventi, T.K. Carter, Ashley Monique Clark, Joe Nunez, Tom Waits, Riz Abbasi, Brian Austin Green, Ian Ziering, Jerry Springer	
O C T O B E R	14	Elizabethtown	Paramount Pictures / Vinyl Films / Cruise/Wagner Productions	Cameron Crowe (director/screenplay); Orlando Bloom, Kirsten Dunst, Susan Sarandon, Alec Baldwin, Bruce McGill, Judy Greer, Jessica Biel, Paul Schneider, Loudon Wainwright III, Gailard Sartain, Jed Rees, Jim Fitzpatrick, Paula Deen, Dan Biggers, Shane Lyons, Emily Rutherfurd, Alice Marie Crowe, Tim Devitt, Ted Manson	
O C T O B E R	14	The Fog	Columbia Pictures / Revolution Studios	Rupert Wainwright (director); Cooper Layne (screenplay); Tom Welling, Maggie Grace, Rade Sherbedgia, DeRay Davis, Selma Blair, Kenneth Welsh, Adrian Hough, Sonja Bennett, Sara Botsford, Cole Heppell, R. Nelson Brown, Mary Black, Jonathon Young, Meghan Heffern, Alex Bruhanski, Matthew Currie Holmes, Christian Bocher, Douglas H. Arthurs, Yves Cameron, Charles André	
O C T O B E R	14	Nine Lives	Magnolia Pictures	Rodrigo García (director/screenplay); Kathy Baker, Amy Brenneman, Elpidia Carrillo, Glenn Close, Stephen Dillane, Dakota Fanning, William Fichtner, LisaGay Hamilton, Holly Hunter, Jason Isaacs, Joe Mantegna, Ian McShane, Molly Parker, Mary Kay Place, Sydney Tamiia Poitier, Aidan Quinn, Miguel Sandoval, Amanda Seyfried, Sissy Spacek, Robin Wright Penn, K Callan, Lawrence Pressman, Andy Umberger, Pat Musick	
O C T O B E R	14	The Prize Winner of Defiance, Ohio	Go Fish Pictures / ImageMovers / Revolution Studios	Jane Anderson (director/screenplay); Julianne Moore, Woody Harrelson, Laura Dern, Trevor Morgan, Simon Reynolds, Monte Gagne, Jordan Todosey, Ellary Porterfield	
O C T O B E R	18	The Batman vs. Dracula	Warner Home Video / Warner Bros. Animation / DC Comics	Michael Goguen (director); Duane Capizzi (screenplay); Rino Romano, Peter Stormare, Tara Strong, Tom Kenny, Kevin Michael Richardson, Alastair Duncan, Jeff Bennett, Richard Green, Neil Ross, James Sie, Carlos Alazraqui, Jack Angel, Bob Bergen, Susan Blu, Rodger Bumpass, Cam Clarke, Robert Clotworthy, John Cygan, Jennifer Darling, Debi Derryberry, Paul Eiding, Bill Farmer, Archie Hahn, Jennifer Hale, Jess Harnell, Richard Horvitz, John Kassir, Matthew Labyorteaux, Sherry Lynn, Danny Mann, Mona Marshall, Mickie McGowan, Phil Proctor, Jan Rabson, Peter Renaday, Kath Soucie, Laura Summer, Pepper Sweeney, Brian Tochi, Jim Ward	
O C T O B E R	21	Doom	Universal Pictures	Andrzej Bartkowiak (director); David Callaham, Wesley Strick (screenplay); Karl Urban, Rosamund Pike, Ben Daniels, Razaaq Adoti, The Rock, Deobia Oparei, Richard Brake, Al Weaver, Dexter Fletcher, Brian Steele, Yao Chin, Robert Russell, Daniel York, Ian Hughes, Sara Houghton, Vladislav Dyntera, Doug Jones,	
O C T O B E R	21	Dreamer	DreamWorks Pictures / Hyde Park Entertainment	John Gatins (director/screenplay); Kurt Russell, Dakota Fanning, Kris Kristofferson, Freddy Rodriguez, Luis Guzmán, Elisabeth Shue, David Morse, Oded Fehr, Ken Howard, Holmes Osborne	
O C T O B E R	21	Kids in America	Slowhand Cinema	Josh Stolberg (director/screenplay); Andrew Shaifer (screenplay); Gregory Smith, Stephanie Sherrin, Caitlin Wachs, Nicole Richie, George Wendt, Adam Arkin, Samantha Mathis, Malik Yoba, Julie Bowen, Chris Morris, Emy Coligado, Alex Anfanger, Crystal Celeste Grant, Rosalie Ward, Genevieve Cortese, Damien Luvara, Marcella Lentz-Pope, Raymond Braun, Andrew Shaifer, Jeff Chase, Leila Charles, Rosanna Arquette, Elizabeth Perkins, Charles Shaughnessy, William Earl Brown, Kim Coles	
O C T O B E R	21	North Country	Warner Bros. Pictures	Niki Caro (director); Michael Seitzman (screenplay); Charlize Theron, Frances McDormand, Sissy Spacek, Woody Harrelson, Sean Bean, Richard Jenkins, Jeremy Renner, Michelle Monaghan, Thomas Curtis, Tom Bower, Linda Emond, Rusty Schwimmer, Jillian Armenante, Xander Berkeley, Chris Mulkey, Corey Stoll, Brad William Henke, John Aylward, Marcus Chait, James Cada, Amber Heard, Cole Williams	
O C T O B E R	21	Shopgirl	Touchstone Pictures / Hyde Park Entertainment	Anand Tucker (director); Steve Martin (screenplay); Steve Martin, Claire Danes, Jason Schwartzman, Bridgette Wilson-Sampras, Sam Bottoms, Frances Conroy, Rebecca Pidgeon, Samantha Shelton, Clyde Kusatsu, Gina Doctor	
O C T O B E R	21	Stay	20th Century Fox	Marc Forster (director); David Benioff (screenplay); Ewan McGregor, Naomi Watts, Ryan Gosling, Janeane Garofalo, Bob Hoskins, Elizabeth Reaser, B.D. Wong, Kate Burton, Amy Sedaris, Isaach de Bankolé, Mark Margolis	
O C T O B E R	28	The Legend of Zorro	Columbia Pictures / Spyglass Entertainment / Amblin Entertainment	Martin Campbell (director); Roberto Orci, Alex Kurtzman (screenplay); Antonio Banderas, Catherine Zeta-Jones, Rufus Sewell, Nick Chinlund, Julio Oscar Mechoso, Adrián Alonso, Shuler Hensley, Michael Emerson, Leo Burmester, Tony Amendola, Pedro Armendáriz Jr., Giovanna Zacarias, Raúl Méndez, Alberto Reyes	
O C T O B E R	28	Dungeons & Dragons: Wrath of the Dragon God	After Dark Films / Zinc Entertainment / Hasbro Entertainment	Gerry Lively (director); Brian Rudnick, Robert Kimmel (screenplay); Mark Dymond, Clemency Burton-Hill, Bruce Payne, Lucy Gaskell, Roy Marsden, Liubomiras Laucevičius, Artūras Orlauskas, Ellie Chidzey, Tim Stern, Steven Elder, Geoffrey T. Bersey, Leonas Ciunis, Vytautas Rumšas, David Merheb, Aurimas Meliešius, Laurynas Jurgelis, Andrius Žebrauskas, Leonardas Pobedonoscevas	
O C T O B E R	28	Prime	Universal Pictures	Ben Younger (director/screenplay); Meryl Streep, Uma Thurman, Bryan Greenberg, Jon Abrahams, Zak Orth, Annie Parisse, Aubrey Dollar, Jerry Adler, Doris Belack, Ato Essandoh, Naomi Aborn, John Rothman, Madhur Jaffrey, Lotte Mandel	
O C T O B E R	28	Saw II	Lions Gate Films / Twisted Pictures	Darren Lynn Bousman (director/screenplay); Leigh Whannell (screenplay); Donnie Wahlberg, Franky G, Glenn Plummer, Beverley Mitchell, Dina Meyer, Lyriq Bent, Emmanuelle Vaugier, Erik Knudsen, Shawnee Smith, Tobin Bell, Timothy Burd, Noam Jenkins, Tony Nappo	
O C T O B E R	28	The Weather Man	Paramount Pictures	Gore Verbinski (director); Steven Conrad (screenplay); Nicolas Cage, Michael Caine, Hope Davis, Nicholas Hoult, Michael Rispoli, Gil Bellows, Judith McConnell, Tom Skilling, Bryant Gumbel, Ed McMahon, Cristina Ferrare, Wolfgang Puck, Gemmenne de la Peña	
N O V E M B E R	4	Chicken Little	Walt Disney Pictures	Mark Dindal (director); Steve Bencich, Ron J. Friedman, Ron Anderson (screenplay); Zach Braff, Garry Marshall, Joan Cusack, Steve Zahn, Don Knotts, Patrick Stewart, Amy Sedaris, Wallace Shawn, Patrick Warburton, Adam West, Fred Willard, Catherine O'Hara, Harry Shearer, Mark Walton, Mark Dindal, Joe Whyte, Will Finn, Steve Bencich, Greg Berg, Julianne Buescher, Chris Edgerly, Pat Fraley, Eddie Frierson, Archie Hahn, Jason Harris, Nathan Kress, Anne Lockhart, Mona Marshall, Scott Menville, Paul Pape, Aaron Spann	
N O V E M B E R	4	Good Night, and Good Luck	Warner Independent Pictures / 2929 Entertainment / Participant Productions	George Clooney (director/screenplay); Grant Heslov (screenplay); David Strathairn, Patricia Clarkson, George Clooney, Jeff Daniels, Robert Downey Jr., Frank Langella, Tate Donovan, Ray Wise, Alex Borstein, Tom McCarthy, Rose Abdoo, Reed Diamond, Matt Ross, Grant Heslov	
N O V E M B E R	4	Jarhead	Universal Pictures / Red Wagon Entertainment	Sam Mendes (director); William Broyles Jr. (screenplay); Jake Gyllenhaal, Peter Sarsgaard, Lucas Black, Chris Cooper, Jamie Foxx, Scott MacDonald, Brian Geraghty, Jacob Vargas, Laz Alonso, Evan Jones, Dennis Haysbert, John Krasinski	
N O V E M B E R	9	Get Rich or Die Tryin'	Paramount Pictures / Interscope/Shady/Aftermath Films / MTV Films	Jim Sheridan (director); Terence Winter (screenplay); Curtis '50 Cent' Jackson, Terrence Howard, Joy Bryant, Bill Duke, Adewale Akinnuoye-Agbaje, Omar Benson Miller, Viola Davis, Tory Kittles, Ashley Walters, Sullivan Walker, Serena Reeder, Mpho Koaho, Russell Hornsby, Joseph Jomo Pierre, Boyd Banks, Marc John Jefferies, Rhyon Nicole Brown, Mykelti Williamson, Ryan Allen	
N O V E M B E R	10	Fuck	Mudflap Films / Rainstorm Entertainment	Steve Anderson (director); Steven Bochco, Pat Boone, Ben Bradlee, Drew Carey, Billy Connolly	
N O V E M B E R	11	Derailed	The Weinstein Company	Mikael Håfström (director); Stuart Beattie (screenplay); Clive Owen, Jennifer Aniston, Vincent Cassel, Melissa George, Giancarlo Esposito, Xzibit, RZA, Addison Timlin, Tom Conti, Rachael Blake, Denis O'Hare, Georgina Chapman, David Morrissey, David Oyelowo, Danny McCarthy, Ortis Deley, Richard Leaf, Catherine McCord	
N O V E M B E R	11	Kiss Kiss Bang Bang	Warner Bros. Pictures / Silver Pictures	Shane Black (director/screenplay); Robert Downey Jr., Val Kilmer, Michelle Monaghan, Corbin Bernsen, Dash Mihok, Larry Miller, Rockmond Dunbar, Shannyn Sossamon, Angela Lindvall, Ariel Winter, Laurence Fishburne	
N O V E M B E R	11	Zathura	Columbia Pictures / Red Wagon Entertainment	Jon Favreau (director); David Koepp, John Kamps (screenplay); Josh Hutcherson, Jonah Bobo, Dax Shepard, Kristen Stewart, Tim Robbins, Frank Oz, Derek Mears, Douglas Tait, John Alexander, Jeff Wolfe, Adam Wills	
N O V E M B E R	16	Breakfast on Pluto	Sony Pictures Classics	Neil Jordan (director/screenplay); Cillian Murphy, Stephen Rea, Brendan Gleeson, Liam Neeson, Gavin Friday, Ruth Negga, Laurence Kinlan, Eva Birthistle, Ian Hart, Steven Waddington, Charlene McKenna, Liam Cunningham, Patrick McCabe, Bryan Ferry, Dominic Cooper, Paraic Breathnach, Mary Coughlan, Seamus Reilly, Ruth McCabe, Conor McEvoy, Emmet Lawlor McHugh, Bianca O'Connor	
N O V E M B E R	18	Harry Potter and the Goblet of Fire	Warner Bros. Pictures / Heyday Films	Mike Newell (director); Steve Kloves (screenplay); Daniel Radcliffe, Rupert Grint, Emma Watson, Ralph Fiennes, Michael Gambon, Brendan Gleeson, Maggie Smith, Robbie Coltrane, Alan Rickman, Miranda Richardson, Timothy Spall, Gary Oldman, Eric Sykes, Jason Isaacs, David Tennant, Mark Williams, David Bradley, Tom Felton, Warwick Davis, Bonnie Wright, Shirley Henderson, Robert Pattinson, Stanislav Ianevski, Devon Murray, Frances de la Tour, Clémence Poésy, Roger Lloyd-Pack, Predrag Bjelac, Robert Hardy, Adrian Rawlins, Geraldine Somerville, Katie Leung, Matthew Lewis, Alfred Enoch, James Phelps, Oliver Phelps, Afshan Azad, Shefali Chowdhury	
N O V E M B E R	18	Walk the Line	20th Century Fox	James Mangold (director/screenplay); Gill Dennis (screenplay); Joaquin Phoenix, Reese Witherspoon, Ginnifer Goodwin, Robert Patrick, Dallas Roberts, Dan John Miller, Larry Bagby, Shelby Lynne, Tyler Hilton, Waylon Payne, Shooter Jennings, Johnathan Rice, Johnny Holiday, Sandra Ellis Lafferty, Dan Beene, Clay Steakley	
N O V E M B E R	23	Bee Season	Fox Searchlight Pictures / Regency Enterprises	Scott McGehee, David Siegel (directors); Naomi Foner Gyllenhaal (screenplay); Richard Gere, Juliette Binoche, Flora Cross, Max Minghella, Kate Bosworth	
N O V E M B E R	23	The Ice Harvest	Focus Features	Harold Ramis (director); Richard Russo, Robert Benton (screenplay); John Cusack, Billy Bob Thornton, Connie Nielsen, Randy Quaid, Oliver Platt, Mike Starr, Ned Bellamy, T.J. Jagodowski, David Pasquesi	
N O V E M B E R	23	In the Mix	Lions Gate Films	Ron Underwood (director); Jacqueline Zambrano (screenplay); Usher, Chazz Palminteri, Emmanuelle Chriqui, Kevin Hart, Robert Davi, Matt Gerald, Robert Costanzo, Anthony Fazio, Geoff Stults, Chris Tardio, K.D. Aubert, Isis Faust, Nick Mancuso, Page Kennedy, Deezer D	
N O V E M B E R	23	Just Friends	New Line Cinema	Roger Kumble (director); Adam Davis (screenplay): Ryan Reynolds, Amy Smart, Anna Faris, Julie Hagerty, Christopher Marquette, Stephen Root, Chris Klein, Fred Ewanuick, Amy Matysio, Barry Flatman, Ty Olsson, Ashley Scott, Trenna Keating, Maria Arce, Todd Lewis, Ryan Kalenchuk	
N O V E M B E R	23	The Polar Express (re-release)	Warner Bros. Pictures / Castle Rock Entertainment / Shangri-La Entertainment / ImageMovers / Playtone	Robert Zemeckis (director/screenplay); William Broyles Jr. (screenplay); Tom Hanks, Daryl Sabara, Josh Hutcherson, Michael Jeter, André Sogliuzzo, Eddie Deezen, Jimmy 'Jax' Pinchak, Nona Gaye, Tinashe, Peter Scolari, Jimmy Bennett, Matthew Hall, Chris Coppola, Phil Fondacaro, Debbie Lee Carrington, Ed Gale, Mark Povinelli, Charles Fleischer, Steven Tyler, Jon Scott, Mark Goodman, Dylan Cash, Connor Matheus, Julene Renee, Brendan King, Andy Pellick, Josh Eli, Rolandas Hendricks, Sean Scott, Mark Mendonca, Gregory Gast, Gordon Hart, Leslie Zemeckis, Isabella Peregrina, Ashly Holloway, Chantel Valdivieso, Meagan Moore, Hayden McFarland	
N O V E M B E R	23	Pride & Prejudice	Focus Features / Working Title Films	Joe Wright (director); Deborah Moggach (screenplay); Keira Knightley, Matthew Macfadyen, Brenda Blethyn, Donald Sutherland, Tom Hollander, Rosamund Pike, Jena Malone, Judi Dench, Carey Mulligan, Talulah Riley, Simon Woods, Tamzin Merchant, Claudie Blakley, Kelly Reilly, Rupert Friend, Cornelius Booth, Penelope Wilton, Peter Wight, Meg Wynn Owen, Sinead Matthews	
N O V E M B E R	23	Rent	Columbia Pictures / Revolution Studios / 1492 Pictures	Chris Columbus (director); Stephen Chbosky (screenplay); Rosario Dawson, Taye Diggs, Wilson Jermaine Heredia, Jesse L. Martin, Idina Menzel, Adam Pascal, Anthony Rapp, Tracie Thoms, Aaron Lohr, Chris Chalk, Mackenzie Firgens, Shaun Earl, Rod Arrants, Mike Garibaldi, Sarah Silverman, Daryl Edwards, Anna Deavere Smith, Kevin Blackton, Bettina Devin, Joel Swetow, Randy Graff, Jennifer Siebel Newsom	
N O V E M B E R	23	Yours, Mine and Ours	Paramount Pictures / Metro-Goldwyn-Mayer / Nickelodeon Movies / Columbia Pictures	Raja Gosnell (director); Ron Burch, David Kidd (screenplay); Dennis Quaid, Rene Russo, Rip Torn, Linda Hunt, Jerry O'Connell, David Koechner, Danielle Panabaker, Sean Faris, Miranda Cosgrove, Drake Bell, Katija Pevec, Dean Collins, Tyler Patrick Jones, Haley Ramm, Ty Panitz, Lil' JJ, Miki Ishikawa, Josh Henderson, Dan Mott, Bridger and Brecken Palmer, Slade Pearce, Andrew Vo, Jennifer and Jessica Habib, Nicholas Roget-King, Jenica Bergere	
D E C E M B E R	2	Æon Flux	Paramount Pictures / Lakeshore Entertainment / MTV Films	Karyn Kusama (director); Phil Hay, Matt Manfredi (screenplay); Charlize Theron, Marton Csokas, Jonny Lee Miller, Sophie Okonedo, Pete Postlethwaite, Frances McDormand, Amelia Warner, Caroline Chikezie, Nikolai Kinski, Paterson Joseph, Yangzom Brauen, Ralph Herforth	
D E C E M B E R	9	Brokeback Mountain	Focus Features / River Road Entertainment	Ang Lee (director); Larry McMurtry, Diana Ossana (screenplay); Heath Ledger, Jake Gyllenhaal, Anne Hathaway, Michelle Williams, Anna Faris, Linda Cardellini, Randy Quaid, David Harbour, Roberta Maxwell, Peter McRobbie, Kate Mara, Scott Michael Campbell, Graham Beckel	
D E C E M B E R	9	The Chronicles of Narnia: The Lion, the Witch and the Wardrobe	Walt Disney Pictures / Walden Media	Andrew Adamson (director/screenplay); Ann Peacock, Christopher Markus, Stephen McFeely (screenplay); Georgie Henley, Skandar Keynes, William Moseley, Anna Popplewell, Tilda Swinton, James McAvoy, Jim Broadbent, Liam Neeson, Ray Winstone, Dawn French, Rupert Everett, Elizabeth Hawthorne, Kiran Shah, James Cosmo, Michael Madsen, Patrick Kake, Shane Rangi, Douglas Gresham, Soumaya Keynes, Morris Cupton, Judy McIntosh, Philip Steuer	
D E C E M B E R	9	Syriana	Warner Bros. Pictures / Participant Productions	Stephen Gaghan (director/screenplay); George Clooney, Matt Damon, Jeffrey Wright, Chris Cooper, William Hurt, Tim Blake Nelson, Amanda Peet, Christopher Plummer, Alexander Siddig, Mazhar Munir, Greta Scacchi, Nicky Henson, David Clennon, Peter Gerety, Tom McCarthy, Mark Strong, Nadim Sawalha, Akbar Kurtha, Amr Waked, Max Minghella	
D E C E M B E R	13	Kronk's New Groove	Walt Disney Home Entertainment	Elliot M. Bour, Saul Andrew Blinkoff (screenplay); Tom Rogers (screenplay); Patrick Warburton, Tracey Ullman, Eartha Kitt, David Spade, John Goodman, Wendie Malick, John Mahoney, John Fiedler, Bob Bergen, Eli Russell Linnetz, Patti Deutsch, Jessie Flower, Anthony Ghannam, Jeff Bennett, April Winchell, Brian Cummings, Tress MacNeille, Travis Oates, Grace Rolek, Kath Soucie, Jack Angel, Bill Farmer, J.P. Manoux, Patrick Pinney, Phil Proctor, Gatlin Kate James, Mark Lotito, Leily Sanchez, Ross Simanteris	
D E C E M B E R	14	King Kong	Universal Pictures	Peter Jackson (director/screenplay); Fran Walsh, Philippa Boyens (screenplay); Naomi Watts, Jack Black, Adrien Brody, Thomas Kretschmann, Colin Hanks, Jamie Bell, Andy Serkis, Kyle Chandler, Evan Parke, John Sumner, Lobo Chan, Craig Hall, William Johnson, Mark Hadlow, Jed Brophy, Todd Rippon, Peter Jackson, Rick Baker, Rick Porras, Bob Burns, Howard Shore	
D E C E M B E R	16	The Family Stone	20th Century Fox	Thomas Bezucha (director/screenplay); Claire Danes, Diane Keaton, Rachel McAdams, Dermot Mulroney, Craig T. Nelson, Sarah Jessica Parker, Luke Wilson, Elizabeth Reaser, Tyrone Giordano, Brian J. White, Jamie Kaler, Paul Schneider, Savannah Stehlin, Bryce and Bradly Harris	
D E C E M B E R	21	Cheaper by the Dozen 2	20th Century Fox	Adam Shankman (director); Sam Harper (screenplay); Steve Martin, Bonnie Hunt, Eugene Levy, Tom Welling, Piper Perabo, Carmen Electra, Jaime King, Hilary Duff, Taylor Lautner, Alyson Stoner, Kevin G. Schmidt, Jacob Smith, Forrest Landis, Liliana Mumy, Morgan York, Blake Woodruff, Brent Kinsman, Shane Kinsman, Jonathan Bennett, Shawn Roberts, Robbie Amell, Melanie Tonello, Courtney Fitzpatrick, Madison Fitzpatrick, Alexander Conti, Peter Keleghan	
D E C E M B E R	21	Fun with Dick and Jane	Columbia Pictures / Imagine Entertainment	Dean Parisot (director); Judd Apatow, Nicholas Stoller (screenplay); Jim Carrey, Téa Leoni, Alec Baldwin, Richard Jenkins, Angie Harmon, John Michael Higgins, Richard Burgi, Carlos Jacott, Stephnie Weir, David Herman, Aaron Michael Drozin, Gloria Garayua, Jason Marsden, Clint Howard, Pasha D. Lychnikoff, Vincent Curatola, Jeff Garlin, Luis Saguar, Timm Sharp, Laurie Metcalf, James Whitmore, Ralph Nader, Crystal the Monkey	
D E C E M B E R	23	Memoirs of a Geisha	Columbia Pictures / DreamWorks Pictures / Spyglass Entertainment / Amblin Entertainment / Red Wagon Entertainment	Rob Marshall (director); Robin Swicord (screenplay); Zhang Ziyi, Ken Watanabe, Michelle Yeoh, Kōji Yakusho, Youki Kudoh, Kaori Momoi, Tsai Chin, Cary-Hiroyuki Tagawa, Suzuka Ohgo, Gong Li, Randall Duk Kim, Mako, Samantha Futerman, Elizabeth Sung, Kenneth Tsang, Eugenia Yuan, Karl Yune, Ted Levine, Paul Adelstein, Kotoko Kawamura	
D E C E M B E R	23	Munich	Universal Pictures / DreamWorks Pictures / Amblin Entertainment	Steven Spielberg (director); Tony Kushner, Eric Roth (screenplay); Eric Bana, Daniel Craig, Ciarán Hinds, Mathieu Kassovitz, Hanns Zischler, Ayelet Zurer, Geoffrey Rush, Omar Metwally, Mehdi Nebbou, Gila Almagor, Michael Lonsdale, Mathieu Amalric, Moritz Bleibtreu, Yvan Attal, Valeria Bruni Tedeschi, Meret Becker, Marie-Josée Croze, Lynn Cohen, Guri Weinberg, Roy Avigdori, Sam Feuer, Karim Saleh, Ziad Adwan	
D E C E M B E R	23	The Ringer	Fox Searchlight Pictures	Barry W. Blaustein (director); Ricky Blitt (screenplay); Johnny Knoxville, Brian Cox, Katherine Heigl, Jed Rees, Bill Chott, Edward Barbanell, Leonard Earl Howze, Geoffrey Arend, John Taylor, Luis Avalos, Leonard Flowers, Terry Funk, Jesse Ventura	
D E C E M B E R	23	Transamerica	The Weinstein Company	Duncan Tucker (director/screenplay); Felicity Huffman, Kevin Zegers, Fionnula Flanagan, Burt Young, Elizabeth Peña, Graham Greene, Carrie Preston, Venida Evans, Calpernia Addams, Stella Maeve, Raynor Scheine, Danny Burstein, Andrea James, Teala Dunn	
D E C E M B E R	25	Casanova	Touchstone Pictures	Lasse Hallström (director); Jeffrey Hatcher, Kimberly Simi (screenplay); Heath Ledger, Sienna Miller, Jeremy Irons, Oliver Platt, Lena Olin, Omid Djalili, Stephen Greif, Ken Stott, Tim McInnerny, Helen McCrory, Charlie Cox, Natalie Dormer, Philip Davis, Lauren Cohan, Eugene Simon	
D E C E M B E R	25	Mrs Henderson Presents	The Weinstein Company	Stephen Frears (director); Martin Sherman (screenplay); Judi Dench, Bob Hoskins, Kelly Reilly, Will Young, Christopher Guest, Toby Jones, Thelma Barlow, Anna Brewster, Rosalind Halstead, Sarah Solemani, Natalia Tena, Thomas Allen, Richard Syms, Samuel Barnett	
D E C E M B E R	25	The New World	New Line Cinema	Terrence Malick (director/screenplay); Colin Farrell, Christopher Plummer, Christian Bale, August Schellenberg, Wes Studi, Q'orianka Kilcher, David Thewlis, Yorick van Wageningen, Ben Mendelsohn, Raoul Trujillo, Brían F. O'Byrne, Irene Bedard, John Savage, Alex Rice, Jamie Harris, Janine Duvitski, Thomas Clair, Michael Greyeyes, Kalani Queypo, Noah Taylor, Ben Chaplin, Eddie Marsan, Billy Merasty, Jonathan Pryce, Alexandra W. B. Malick	
D E C E M B E R	25	The Producers	Universal Pictures / Columbia Pictures	Susan Stroman (director); Mel Brooks, Thomas Meehan (screenplay); Nathan Lane, Matthew Broderick, Uma Thurman, Will Ferrell, Gary Beach, Roger Bart, Jon Lovitz, Michael McKean, David Huddleston, Richard Kind, Eileen Essell, Debra Monk, Andrea Martin, John Barrowman, Brent Barrett, Peter Bartlett, Jason Antoon, Marilyn Sokol, Danny Mastrogiorgio, Mel Brooks, Ernie Sabella, Jonathan Freeman, Jim Borstelmann, Kathy Fitzgerald, Ronald Rusinek, Fran Brill, Tyler Bunch, James Kroupa, Tim Lagasse, Peter Linz, Drew Massey, Joey Mazzarino, Martin P. Robinson, Matt Vogel, Victor Yerrid	
D E C E M B E R	25	Rumor Has It	Warner Bros. Pictures / Village Roadshow Pictures	Rob Reiner (director); Ted Griffin (screenplay); Jennifer Aniston, Kevin Costner, Shirley MacLaine, Mark Ruffalo, Richard Jenkins, Christopher McDonald, Mena Suvari, Steve Sandvoss, Mike Vogel, Kathy Bates, George Hamilton, Lisa Vachon, Jennifer Taylor, Maree Cheatham, Frank Novak, Shannon Farnon, Jenny Wade, Erinn Bartlett, Rolando Molina, Erinn Hayes, Jaime Ray Newman, Andy Milder, Gabriel Jarret, Clyde Kusatsu, Paul Ganus, Leigh French, George Gerdes, Lyman Ward, Jordan Lund, Anne Bancroft, Colleen Camp, Bill Clinton, Michael Durrell, Barry Goldwater, Dustin Hoffman, Roger Lim	
D E C E M B E R	28	Match Point	DreamWorks Pictures	Woody Allen (director/screenplay); Jonathan Rhys Meyers, Scarlett Johansson, Emily Mortimer, Matthew Goode, Brian Cox, Penelope Wilton, Ewen Bremner, James Nesbitt, Rupert Penry-Jones, Margaret Tyzack, Alexander Armstrong, Geoffrey Streatfeild, Miranda Raison, Zoe Telford, Rose Keegan, Colin Salmon, Toby Kebbell	
D E C E M B E R	29	The Matador	The Weinstein Company / Miramax Films / Stratus Film Company / DEJ Productions	Richard Shepard (director/screenplay); Pierce Brosnan, Greg Kinnear, Hope Davis, Philip Baker Hall, Dylan Baker, William Raymond, Adam Scott, Portia Dawson, Gabriela Goldsmith	

== See also ==
- List of 2005 box office number-one films in the United States
- 2005 in the United States
