= Mark Spragg =

American writer (born 1952)

Mark Spragg (born 1952) is an American writer. He is the author of three novels and one book of nonfiction, mostly set in Wyoming, where he grew up.

== Biography ==
Mark Spragg grew up on the Crossed Sabers Ranch, a Wyoming dude ranch eight miles east of Yellowstone National Park. He graduated from the University of Wyoming in Laramie in 1974, with a major in English. He worked on an oil rig, shoed horses, and led pack trips to support his writing.

In 1999 he published a memoir, Where Rivers Change Direction, about his unusual childhood, with no TV or radio but surrounded by vast expanses of rugged outdoor beauty. The book received starred reviews in Publishers Weekly and Library Journal, and won the 2000 Mountains and Plains Booksellers Award for Nonfiction

Spragg later published the novels The Fruit of Stone, An Unfinished Life, and Bone Fire. He also co-wrote the screenplay to An Unfinished Life with his wife, Virginia Korus Spragg.

He lives with his wife, Virginia, in Red Lodge, Montana.

== Works ==
=== Novels ===
The Fruit of Stone. Riverhead Hardcover, 2002. Highbridge Audiobook, 2003. Riverhead Trade, 2003. Vintage Contemporaries, 2011. ISBN 978-0307739384 Reviewed in the Economist and Publishers Weekly ". According to WorldCat, the book is held in 817 libraries.

An Unfinished Life. Knopf, 2004. Vintage, 2005. ISBN 978-1400076147. Reviewed in the New York Times by Claire Dederer and USA Today According to WorldCat, the book is held in 1342 libraries.

Bone Fire. Knopf, 2010. Vintage, 2011. ISBN 978-030747435-3 Reviewed in Outside Magazine and Library Journal s " According to WorldCat, the book is held in 829 libraries.

=== Nonfiction ===
Where Rivers Change Direction. University of Utah Hardcover, 1999. Riverhead Paperback, 2000. ISBN 978-1-5732-2825-1 This books was reviewed in Publishers Weekly " and Library Journal " According to WorldCat, the book is held in 805 libraries
