= Steven Christopher Parker =

American actor, writer, and director (born 1989)

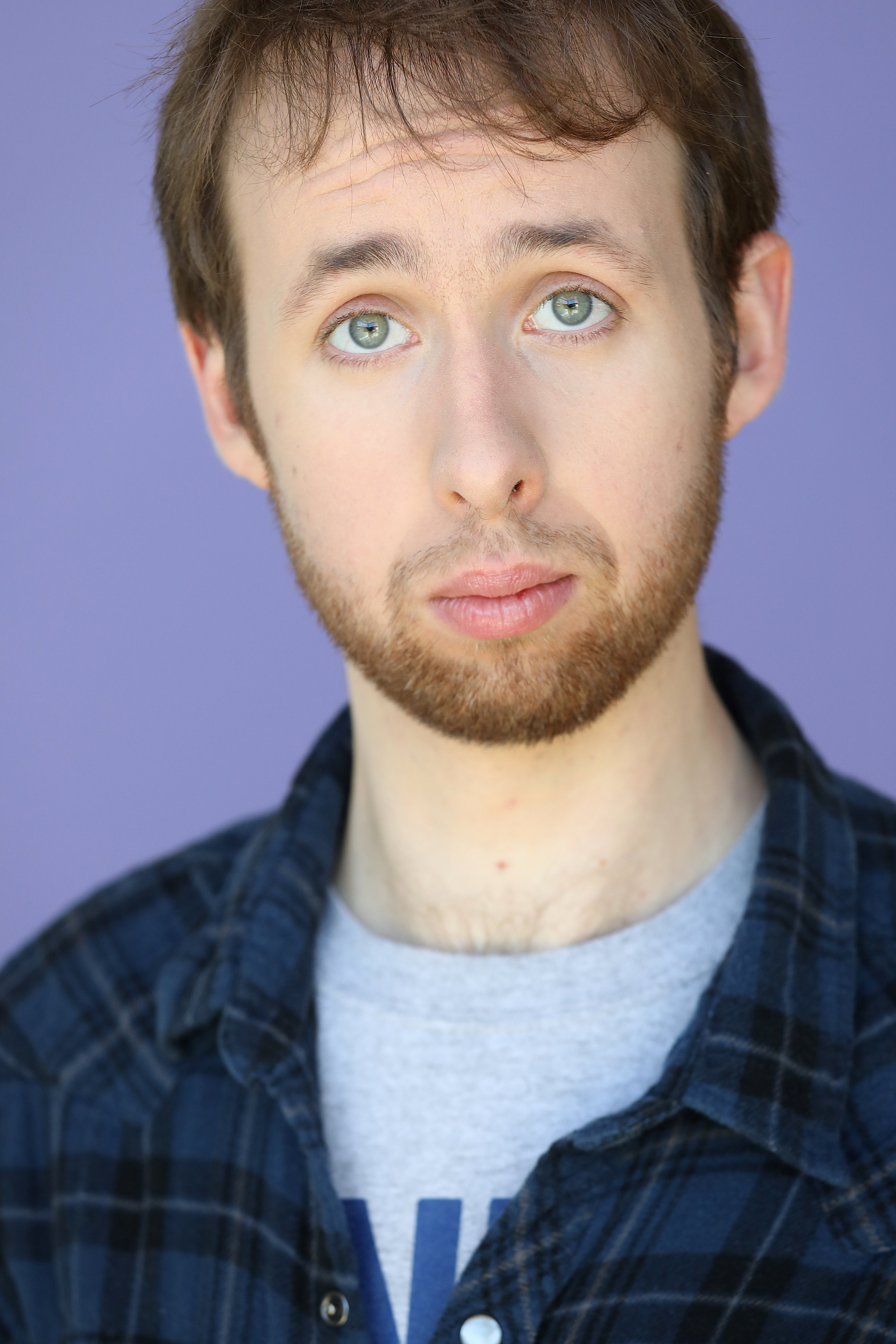
- Parker professional headshot 2022
- Born: January 8, 1989 (age 37): Littleton, Colorado, United States
- Other name: Steven C. Parker
- Occupations: Actor; writer; producer; director
- Years active: 2005–present
- Website: www.stevenchristopherparker.com

Steven Christopher Parker (born January 8, 1989) is an American actor, writer, and director. Onscreen, he is best known for his role as "Sledgehammer" Big Wes, a middle school basketball team player in the 2005 film Rebound starring Martin Lawrence. More recently, Parker has co-written and directed spoof Broadway musicals including one based on the TV series Lost (Lost: The Musical) and another parodying Game of Thrones (Shame of Thrones).

== Professional career ==
Parker is a SAG-Award winning actor who has appeared in about a dozen feature films, including Juno and Little Miss Sunshine. On television, Parker played the supporting role of Harold, a young medical intern, on the 14th season of ER. He played a pizza delivery impostor in a late-2008 television advertisement for DiGiorno frozen pizza.

Parker was a contestant on The Price Is Right on his birthday in January 2010. However, he did not win the game and ended up with only 55 cents when spinning the Big Wheel, which was not enough to make it into the "Showcase Showdown". The show was broadcast on CBS on March 2, 2010.

On October 26, 2015, Lost the Musical: We Have to Go Back (co-written by Parker with Steven Brandon) premiered at the Lillian Theater in Hollywood. A musical comedy based on the long-running TV show Lost, the spoof musical offered each audience a choice of three different endings, which The Hollywood Reporter characterized as "70s cartoon," "80s sci-fi movie" or "90s sitcom."

Two years later, Parker and Brandon again collaborated to write and produce another musical spoofing a popular TV series, Game of Thrones the Rock Musical: An Unauthorized Parody. The show premiered at the Macha Theatre in West Hollywood, and also performed in San Diego during 2017 Comic-Con before moving to the Jerry Orbach Theater Off Broadway in NYC.

The show received generally positive reviews, with the NY Times saying "With breakneck pacing, the show, which originated on the West Coast, blends deep affection for 'Thrones' with a keen satirical eye"; The Hollywood Reporter saying the show "offers a clever mix of first-season (or book, if you're so inclined) storylines, snarky pop culture references and not-so-subtle foreshadowing"; and StageBuddy.com saying "it was easy to see why parodies are so popular after seeing the Game of Thrones version.."

Parker has since worked on many theater shows at venues across Los Angeles and San Bernardino as a director, lighting designer, and technical director including "Into the Woods", "Shrek Jr", "High School Musical", "Olympus", "Matilda", "The Columbine Project", "Working 2020", "A Good American", and "Broken Code, Bird Switching".

Parker was a contestant yet again on The Price Is Right on a holiday episode in December 2025 (with his named spelled 'Stephen'). He won just over $8,000 in prizes including a new living room set and a trip to San Francisco. He ended up spinning two 60 cent spins when spinning the Big Wheel, which did not qualify him into playing in the "Showcase Showdown". The show was broadcast on CBS on December 23, 2025.
