= Oren Williams =

American actor

- Born: Beverly Hills, California, U.S.
- Years active: 1995 - present

Oren Williams is an American actor and is known for acting in the 2005 film Rebound.

Williams grew up in Los Angeles.

== Filmography ==
- The Players Club (1998) as Young Jamal
- Sliders (1998) as Perkins
- Blade Squad (1998) as Miltie
- Any Day Now (1999) as Jordan Moody
- The Amanda Show (1999) as Kid
- For Your Love (1999) as Jeffrey
- City of Angels (2000) as Oliver Coleman
- Chicago Hope (2000) as Raymond Wilkes
- Kingdom Come (2001) as Junior
- For Love of Olivia (2001) as Henry
- ER (2002) as Derrick Royston
- The Shield (2003) as Kid
- Ride or Die (2003) as Kyle
- Clifford's Really Big Movie (2004) as Charley
- Rebound (2005) as Keith Ellis

Lincoln Heights (TV Series 2006–2009) Oren Williams as Marquis

== Personal life ==
He is the brother of Nickelodeon actor Zachary Isaiah Williams. He is the son of Actor, Writer and Producer Rugg Williams.

== Television ==
Year	Title	Character	Notes
2006–2007	Cold Case	Andre Halstead	Recurring Role-3 Episodes
2007	Calvin and Freddie's Cosmic Encounters	Calvin	Main Role
