= Rebound (2005 film) =

2005 American comedy film directed by Steve Carr

- Theatrical release poster
- Directed by: Steve Carr
- Screenplay by: Jon Lucas; Scott Moore
- Story by: William Wolff; Ed Decter; John J. Strauss
- Produced by: Robert Simonds
- Starring: Martin Lawrence; Wendy Raquel Robinson; Breckin Meyer; Horatio Sanz; Megan Mullally
- Cinematography: Glen MacPherson
- Edited by: Craig Herring
- Music by: Teddy Castellucci
- Production companies: Robert Simonds Productions; Runteldat Entertainment
- Distributed by: 20th Century Fox
- Release date: July 1, 2005
- Running time: 86 minutes
- Country: United States
- Language: English
- Budget: $33.1 million
- Box office: $17.5 million

Rebound is a 2005 American sports comedy film directed by Steve Carr. It stars Martin Lawrence as a disgraced college basketball coach who returns to his old middle school to coach the boys' basketball team.

Rebound was released by 20th Century Fox on July 1, 2005. The film received negative reviews from critics and was a box office bomb, grossing $17.5 million against a $33.1 million budget. This was also Tara Correa's only film role. She was murdered in a gang shooting on October 21, 2005, three months after the film's release.

== Plot ==
Coach Roy McCormick was once college basketball's top mastermind. His attention began to turn to what endorsement contracts he could secure instead of actually coaching his team. Roy lets his temper get the best of him in most situations. After causing a mishap with a rude mascot, the board bans McCormick from collegiate basketball until he can show that he can control his anger. Roy's reputation has doomed him to being un-hireable as a long time passes with no job offers. However, McCormick then gets one job offer, from Mount Vernon Junior High School which was also where he graduated as a teenager. His alma mater's basketball team, the Smelters, is looking for somebody to coach the team, and the headmistress thinks an alumnus of his caliber in basketball would be ideal.

Although irritated, Roy realizes he has no other options and accepts the coaching job, figuring this is the way to prove he can control his anger and get back into the spotlight of college basketball. As Roy begins coaching the squad, he gets into an embarrassing situation that he's never been in before and decides, enough is enough. He eventually starts teaching the concepts of basketball to his new team, albeit placing paramount emphasis on sportsmanship. With teaching and learning being done between both Roy and the kids, the Smelters eventually start having success. Unexpectedly, this leads Roy to find out he's been missing his simple love of the game the whole time. Eventually Roy gains a new appreciation for his old school and figures that while it does not lead to big money endorsements, he can earn a comfortable living from this job.

== Cast ==
- Martin Lawrence as:
  - Roy McCormick (the new coach of Team Smelters)
  - Preacher Don McCormick, Roy's identical twin brother
- Wendy Raquel Robinson as Jeanie Ellis, Roy's love interest
- Breckin Meyer as Tim Fink, Roy's friend
- Horatio Sanz as Mr. Newirth, Roy's assistant
- Oren Williams as Keith Ellis, Jeanie's son (the #4 of Team Smelters on Captain)
- Patrick Warburton as Larry Burgess Sr., Roy's rival
- Megan Mullally as Mary Walsh, the principal of Mount Vernon Junior High School
- Eddy Martin as One Love (the #23 of Team Smelters)
- Steven Christopher Parker as Wes "Sledgehammer" (the #00 of Team Smelters from New Recruit)
- Steven Anthony Lawrence as Ralph (the #1 of Team Smelters)
- Logan McElroy as Fuzzy (the #32 of Team Smelters)
- Gus Hoffman as Goggles (the #33 of Team Smelters)
- Tara Correa as Big Mac, Wes's love interest (the #45 of Team Smelters from New Recruit)
- Amy Bruckner as Annie, the co-commentator of Mount Vernon Basketball Field
- Alia Shawkat as Amy, the co-commentator of Mount Vernon Basketball Field
- Fred Stoller as Late Carl
- Katt Micah Williams as Preacher Don's Sidekick
- Beau Billingslea as NCBA board member
- Cody Linley as Larry Burgess Jr., Larry's son
- Robert Rusler as Falcons coach
- Gary Owen as Vultures mascot
- Brian Palermo as Alumni Association Member #1
- Matt McCoy as Alumni Association Member #2
- Todd Glass as Referee Steve
- Marshall Bell as NCBA Vice President (uncredited)
- Tara Lynne Barr as a student (uncredited)

The Best Damn Sports Show Period's Tom Arnold, John Salley, Chris Rose and Bryan Cox all appear uncredited as themselves.

== Release ==
=== Critical reception ===
Rebound received negative reviews from critics. On Rotten Tomatoes, the film holds a 15% rating, based on 89 reviews, with an average rating of 3.7/10. The site's consensus reads, "Rebound ought to entertain its target audience, but there's nothing here for those who've seen The Bad News Bears or its countless derivatives." On Metacritic, the film has a score of 36 out of 100, based on 25 critics, indicating "generally unfavorable reviews".

=== Box office ===
The film opened on July 1, 2005, and grossed $5,033,848 in its opening weekend, hitting #7; by the end of its run, the film had grossed $16,809,014 domestically and $683,000 internationally for a worldwide total of $17,492,014. Compared to its budget of $33.1 million, Rebound was a flop.

== Music ==
Songs featured in the film

- Treat 'Em Right by Chubb Rock
- What's Up Doc? (Can We Rock) by Fu-Schnickens
- Sweet Georgia Brown by Brother Bones
- Brick House by The Commodores
- Sledgehammer by Peter Gabriel
- Keep Movin' by Dub Pistols
- (Every Time I Turn Around) Back in Love Again by L.T.D.
- Take Me to the Next Phase by The Isley Brothers
- Hands Up by The Black Eyed Peas
- Jump Around by House of Pain
- Hey Ya! by Outkast
- Puppy Love by Paul Anka
- Unbelievable by EMF
- Eye of the Tiger by Survivor

== See also ==
- List of basketball films
