= An Unfinished Life =

2005 film by Lasse Hallström

- Theatrical release poster
- Directed by: Lasse Hallström
- Written by: Virginia Korus Spragg
- Based on: An Unfinished Life by Mark Spragg
- Produced by: Leslie Holleran; Alan Ladd, Jr. Joe Roth; Bob Weinstein; Harvey Weinstein
- Starring: Robert Redford; Jennifer Lopez; Morgan Freeman; Josh Lucas; Camryn Manheim; Damian Lewis; Becca Gardner
- Cinematography: Oliver Stapleton
- Edited by: Andrew Mondshein
- Music by: Deborah Lurie
- Production companies: Miramax Films; Revolution Studios; Initial Entertainment Group; The Ladd Company
- Distributed by: Miramax Films (United States, Canada, United Kingdom and Ireland); Initial Entertainment Group (International)
- Release dates: August 19, 2005 (EIFF); September 9, 2005 (United States)
- Running time: 108 minutes
- Country: United States
- Language: English
- Budget: $30 million
- Box office: $18.6 million

An Unfinished Life is a 2005 American neo-Western drama film directed by Lasse Hallström, and based on the Mark Spragg novel of the same name. The film stars Robert Redford, Jennifer Lopez, and Morgan Freeman. It is the story of a gruff Wyoming rancher (Redford) who must reconcile his relationship with his struggling daughter-in-law (Lopez) and previously unknown-to-him granddaughter, after they show up unexpectedly at his ranch and ask to stay with him and his disabled best friend and neighbor (Freeman).

An Unfinished Life premiered at EIFF on August 19, 2005 before being released by Miramax Films on September 9, 2005 in the United States, with Initial Entertainment Group releasing in other territories. The film received mixed reviews from critics and was a box office bomb, grossing $18.6 million against a $30 million budget.

== Plot ==
One year ago, a bear stole a calf from Einar Gilkyson and Mitch Bradley's ranch. The two friends attempted to save the calf, but the bear viciously attacked Mitch — and because Einar was drunk, he failed to save Mitch from serious injury. The bear escaped into the mountains.

A year later, Mitch's wounds still cause him constant pain. Einar cares for Mitch daily, giving him morphine injections, food, and friendship. He leans his guilt on emotional crutches, while Mitch struggles to walk with real crutches. The bear is later seen foraging for food in town. Sheriff Crane Curtis captures it and it ends up in the town zoo. About the same time, Einar's long-lost daughter-in-law Jean shows up on his doorstep.

Jean and her young daughter, Griff, move in with Einar and Mitch. Einar's son, Griffin, had married Jean years ago. She discovered that she was pregnant with Griff after Griffin died in a car accident, after which the family broke up. Tension exists between Einar and Jean, as both are still grieving for Griffin; tensions build as Einar has always blamed Jean for his son's death.

Since Griffin died, Jean has been in a series of unsuccessful relationships. She moved in with Einar to escape her abusive boyfriend, Gary Winston. Jean starts working at a local coffee shop to earn money to become independent. There she befriends Nina, another waitress. Sheriff Curtis also becomes her friend.

Meanwhile, Gary has tracked Jean down and appears in town. Initially, Einar and the sheriff throw him out of town. Einar asks Jean to tell him how Griffin died. Jean says they flipped a coin to determine who would drive, and she lost. At 3 a.m., the two tired souls had set out on the last leg of a long trip. Jean fell asleep at the wheel. The car flipped six times. Griffin died, but Jean survived. When Einar learns the truth about his son's death, he says they'll have to talk about Jean moving out. Jean says she's through talking. The next morning she takes Griff with her and leaves to stay with Nina, who ends up helping her understand Einar's gruff ways and bitterness because Nina is also grieving the loss of her own daughter.

Griff, who has begun to build a relationship with her grandfather, leaves her mother and goes back to the ranch alone. Einar meets Jean at the diner and invites her to come back and live with him after he and Griff go on a camping trip.

The "camping trip" is a cover story meant to allow them time to carry out a request from Mitch to set free the bear who mauled him. The plan to get the bear into a transport cage does not go well. Griff accidentally knocks the gearshift lever into neutral while Einar is luring the bear into the cage. The bear gets free, and Einar is injured as he jumps out of the way. Griff drives Einar to the hospital, where he and Jean attempt to reconcile. Back at the ranch, Mitch survives a peaceful confrontation with the bear from his past. It goes into the mountains, where it belongs.

Meanwhile, Gary returns to the area and comes to the ranch the next day to accost Jean. He and Einar have an explosive confrontation that ends in Einar threatening Gary with his rifle, before badly beating him up. Gary, battered and exhausted, leaves on a Trailways bus as it moves through Nebraska.

In the final scene, Einar affectionately talks with one of his cats, who throughout the whole story he'd coldly ignored. Griff invites Sheriff Curtis for lunch when he drops by to see Jean (previously, Griff, knowing of her mother fooling around with the sheriff, had told him not to stay for lunch). All is well as Mitch narrates the last seconds of the story, describing to Einar his dreams of flying above the earth and coming to understand things about life.

== Cast ==
- Robert Redford as Einar Gilkyson
- Jennifer Lopez as Jean Gilkyson
- Morgan Freeman as Mitch Bradley
- Josh Lucas as Crane Curtis
- Camryn Manheim as Nina
- Damian Lewis as Gary Winston
- Becca Gardner as Griff Gilkyson

== Production ==
While set in Wyoming, An Unfinished Life was actually filmed in the Canadian towns of Ashcroft, Savona, and Kamloops, British Columbia.

== Release ==
=== Critical reception ===
Reviews of the film were mixed, which is something Roger Ebert alluded to in his three (out of four) star review in the Chicago Sun-Times, stating: "The typical review of "An Unfinished Life" will mention that it was kept on the shelf at Miramax for two years, and is now being released as part of the farewell flood of leftover product produced by the Weinstein brothers." Ebert went on to praise the film and the performances, saying "give Lopez your permission to be good again; she is the same actress now as when we thought her so new and fine," and "It's not often noted, but Redford plays anger well. His face gets tight and he looks away. Freeman never seems to be playing anything; he sees what he sees."

The film holds a 53% approval rating on review aggregator site Rotten Tomatoes, based on 139 reviews with an average rating of 6.1/10. The website's "critical consensus" reads: "A story of disjointed family members yearning for true emotional depth, An Unfinished Life teeters between overtly saccharine sentiments and moments of real intimacy."

=== Box office ===
An Unfinished Life opened at number 16 at the domestic box office on a limited release, earning $1,008,308 during its opening weekend. In its second weekend, with a wider release, the film rose to number 11 with $2,052,066. Despite its $30 million budget, the film made only $18,618,284 worldwide by the time of its closing.

=== Awards ===
The film won the best makeup award from the Canadian Network of Makeup Artists (Jayne Dancose), and it won the Genesis Award as best feature for 2005.
