= Tara Correa-McMullen =

American actress (1989–2005)

- Born: Shalvah McMullen; May 24, 1989; Westminster, Vermont, U.S.
- Died: October 21, 2005 (aged 16); Inglewood, California, U.S.
- Cause of death: Murder by gunshots
- Resting place: Forest Lawn Memorial Park, Los Angeles, California
- Other name: Tara Correa
- Occupation: Actress
- Years active: 2004–2005

Tara Correa-McMullen (born Shalvah McMullen; May 24, 1989 – October 21, 2005) was an American actress. She played gang member Graciela Reyes on the CBS drama series Judging Amy. On October 21, 2005, she was shot and killed by a gang member in front of her apartment complex in Inglewood, California.

== Early life ==
Tara Correa-McMullen was born Shalvah McMullen in Westminster, Vermont, to mother Mary Devra Correa and father Thomas McMullen. In 1996, she, her mother, and her older sister Abigail moved to Southern California, and later settled in Venice, an affluent neighborhood of Los Angeles. Correa-McMullen attended Claremont Middle School and later Venice High School, where she sang in the school's choir.

== Career ==
Correa-McMullen's only film role was in the 2005 film Rebound, when her mother, who was working for a casting company at the time, recommended her daughter for the role. Correa-McMullen had no acting experience prior to landing the role. She later won a part as a recurring character on the CBS drama series Judging Amy as Graciela Reyes, a young gang member and appeared in seven episodes, which aired in first run from October 2004 to April 2005, during the series' final season. Correa-McMullen also had a small role on one episode of Nickelodeon television series Zoey 101 in 2005.

== Murder and funeral ==
In early 2005, 16-year-old Correa-McMullen moved into her own apartment in Inglewood, California, and began dating a gang member, Christopher Avery, who was ten years older than she was. On the evening of October 21, 2005, she was gunned down by gang member Damien Watts. At the time of her death, Correa-McMullen was outside her apartment complex and was trying to run inside for safety. Two other people were also shot in the incident, but survived. She is interred at Forest Lawn Memorial Park in the Hollywood Hills of Los Angeles.

=== Aftermath ===
Damien Watts was charged with one count of murder and two counts of attempted murder on March 1, 2006. On January 23, 2009, he was convicted of Correa-McMullen's murder, the murder of another person chosen at random the day before he killed Correa-McMullen, and six counts of attempted murder over his two day shooting spree (at three locations), with special circumstance for allegations of gang murder and multiple murders; none of the multiple shooting victims were involved in gang activity except Correa-McMullen, but Watts' stated intent was "to shoot up rival gang territory". Watts was sentenced to five consecutive life sentences without parole on February 27, 2009. Watts' accomplice in the shooting spree, Joseph Wayne Jones, was also sentenced to life without parole.

== In popular culture ==
Correa-McMullen's murder was featured in "A Rising Star Shot Down", the premiere episode of the 2024 season of the true crime documentary series Death by Fame, on the Canadian Investigation Discovery.

== Filmography ==
=== Film and television ===
Year	Title	Role	Notes
2004–2005	Judging Amy	Graciela Reyes	7 episodes
2005	Zoey 101	Ridgeway Girl	Episode: “Disc Golf”
2005	Rebound	Big Mac	Final role
