= Amy Bruckner =

American attorney and former actress

- Born: Amelia Bruckner; March 28, 1991 (age 35); Conifer, Colorado, U.S.
- Education: New York University; UCLA School of Law
- Occupations: Attorney; former actress; former singer
- Years active: 2002–2017

Amelia Bruckner (born March 28, 1991), known professionally as Amy Bruckner, is an American attorney and former actress and singer. She is best known for her roles on Disney Channel as Pim Diffy in Phil of the Future (2004–2006) and as the voice of Haley Long in American Dragon: Jake Long (2005–2007). She also appeared as Bess Marvin in the film Nancy Drew (2007). After retiring from acting, Bruckner earned a Juris Doctor from UCLA School of Law and practices entertainment law.

== Career ==
=== Acting ===
Bruckner was born in Conifer, Colorado, and raised in Atlanta, Georgia. She began acting at age 10 with a guest appearance on ER in 2002, and went on to appear in episodes of Ally McBeal, The West Wing, Judging Amy, and Oliver Beene. From 2004 to 2005, she had a recurring role as Zoe on Malcolm in the Middle.

Bruckner's breakout role came as Pim Diffy in the Disney Channel sitcom Phil of the Future (2004–2006), appearing in all 43 episodes of the series. For this role, she received a Young Artist Award nomination for Best Performance in a TV Series (Comedy or Drama) – Leading Young Actress in 2006. Concurrently, she voiced Haley Long in the animated series American Dragon: Jake Long (2005–2007). She also participated in the Disney Channel Circle of Stars, singing a backing soprano vocal on their cover of "A Dream Is a Wish Your Heart Makes".

In film, Bruckner appeared in the sports comedy Rebound (2005) alongside Martin Lawrence, and as Bess Marvin in Nancy Drew (2007). Her final acting credit was in the TV film The Assault (2014).

=== Education and legal career ===
Following her acting career, Bruckner studied human rights and feminist theory at New York University's Gallatin School of Individualized Study, earning a Bachelor of Arts in 2013. She then earned her Juris Doctor from UCLA School of Law in 2021, where she served as Managing Editor of the UCLA Law Review.

Bruckner was a litigation associate at Katten Muchin Rosenman from 2021 to 2024, focusing on entertainment litigation. In October 2024, she joined Kendall Brill & Kelly LLP, specializing in entertainment law on behalf of studios, production companies, and television networks. She has been recognized by the American Bar Association as a Rising Star in Entertainment Law.

== Filmography ==
Film and television
Year	Title	Role	Notes
2002	ER	Ariel	Episode: "A Simple Twist of Fate"
2002	Ally McBeal	Hayley	Episode: "Woman"
2002	The West Wing	Sally	Episode: "Game On"
2003	American Dreams	Elaine	
2003	Judging Amy	Emily Michaels	
2003–2004	Oliver Beene	Susan Brotsky	4 episodes
2004–2005	Malcolm in the Middle	Zoe	3 episodes
2004–2006	Phil of the Future	Pim Diffy	Regular role; 43 episodes
2005	Rebound	Annie	Feature film
2005–2007	American Dragon: Jake Long	Haley Long	Regular role (voice)
2007	Nancy Drew	Bess Marvin	Feature film
2014	The Assault	Frankie	TV film
2017	Trust (and Other Lies We Tell Ourselves to Sleep at Night)	Dulcinea	

== Personal life ==
In 2018, she was engaged to her longtime boyfriend Timothy Rogan.
