= Eddy Martin =

American actor and musician (born 1990)

- Born: Edward Martin; September 10, 1990 (age 34); California
- Occupation(s): Actor, singer
- Years active: 2003–present

Eddy Martin (born September 10, 1990) is an American actor and musician. He is best known for his roles as One Love in the movie Rebound, and as Joaquin in the Nickelodeon original show Just Jordan.

He sings a variety of music including mariachi music, ballads, and pop. He plays the drums and piano, and writes his own music.

He starred in the 2003 television movie The Maldonado Miracle, directed by Salma Hayek. He played the role of Jose Maldonado, a lonely migrant boy searching for his father.

He appeared as Roberto in the second season of the PBS drama American Family, directed by Gregory Nava, which aired in 2004.

Eddy played Thad, one of the Dalton Academy Warblers, on the television series Glee.

He starred as Junior in the 2013 movie Our Boys, directed by Leonardo Ricagni.

== Filmography ==
=== Film ===
Year	Title	Role	Notes
2003	The Maldonado Miracle	Jose Maldonado	Short film
2004	Spanglish	Fourteen-Year-Old Boy	Short film
2005	Rebound	One Love	
2008	Drillbit Taylor	Random Kid	
2011	Fred 2: Night of the Living Fred	Boy #2	
2012	Your Father's Daughter	Ricardo	
2013	Hansel & Gretel Get Baked	Manny	
2013	The Shifting	Young Delgado	
2013	Our Boys	Junior	Short film
2015	Crazy Eyes	Taylor	
2016	Nomophobia	Jesus	
2020	Partly Entertainers	Cezar	
