= Hope & Faith season 1 =

Hope & Faith
- Season 1
- DVD cover
- No. of episodes: 25

Release
- Original network: ABC
- Original release: September 26, 2003 – May 14, 2004

Season chronology
- Next → Season 2

The first season of Hope & Faith originally aired in the United States on ABC. It premiered with "Pilot" on September 26, 2003, and ended with "Daytime Emmys: Part 2" on May 14, 2004 with a total of 25 episodes. The DVD was released on 31 March 2009 for the first time ever by Lionsgate Home Entertainment in a 4-disc set.

Notable guest stars in season one include: Robert Wagner, Tony Curtis, Lynda Carter, Regis Philbin, Mimi Rogers, Kathie Lee Gifford, Tom Arnold, Jenny McCarthy, Susan Lucci, Eric Braeden, and Susan Flannery.

== Main cast ==
- Kelly Ripa as Faith Fairfield
- Faith Ford as Hope Shanowski
- Ted McGinley as Charley Shanowski
- Nicole Paggi as Sydney Shanowski
- Macey Cruthird as Hayley Shanowski
- Jansen Panettiere as Justin Shanowski (pilot)
- Paulie Litt as Justin Shanowski (from episode 2)

== Guest cast ==
List of guest cast throughout season one:

- Daryl Edwards
- Michelle Agnew
- Heather Fairfield
- Olga Merediz
- Daniel Ziskie
- Gloria Cromwell
- Jason Olive
- Matthew Wilkas
- Val Emmich
- John Havens
- Robert Lehrer
- Marylouise Burke
- John Scurti
- Jonathan Michael Chiang
- Alina De Palma
- Ashley Marie Greiner
- Stephen G. Smith II
- Molly Cheek
- Tom Deckman
- Jesse Luke Dunn
- Saidah Arrika Ekulona
- Scott Geyer
- Trevor Heins
- Judy Kuhn
- Galadriel Masterson
- Marisa Redanty
- Cristián de la Fuente
- Ray Crisara
- Christopher Jordan
- Brett Murphy
- Regis Philbin
- Michael Bachmann
- Christopher Lee Jewett
- Tonye Patano
- Clint Black
- Nicholas Reese Art
- Greg Jackson
- Devon O'Day
- Kim Patton-Johnston
- Laksh Singh
- Robert Wagner
- Lynda Carter
- Lovette George
- Gregor Manns
- Erin Quinn Purcell
- Jim Gaffigan
- Kelly Coffield Park
- Jonathan Hadary
- Mike Arotsky
- Buzz Bovshow
- Lisa Jolley
- Linda Miller
- Michael Tenagila
- Nancy Wu
- Rendall Devaney
- Danny Woodburn
- Rebecca Budig
- Claire Alpern
- Brian Donahue
- Sascha Eiblmayr
- Lydia Jordan
- Sebastian Rand
- Derdriu Ring
- Brittany Singer
- Constance Barron
- James Murtaugh
- James Villemaire
- Delaine Yates
- Jasmine Lobe
- Nick Sullivan
- Mimi Rogers
- Matthew Lawler
- Peter Marx
- Sam Murphy
- Peter Vack
- Kathy Lee Gifford
- Fisher Stevens
- Joe Grifasi
- Ashley Burritt
- Julia Meehan
- Larry Mitchell
- Berni Padden
- Ruth Padden
- Kevin Sorbo
- Roger Clemens
- Kene Holliday
- Chuck Ardezzone
- Ben Bailey
- Willie Randolph
- Oren Stevens
- Rob Campbell
- Jason Butler Harner
- Brooke Johnson
- Patrick Garner
- Gretha Boston
- Christopher Braden Jones
- Adam Kulbersh
- Angel Sing
- Dara M. Sowell
- Charles Techman
- Erika Thomas
- Village
- Marcia Jean Kurtz
- Lisa Altomare
- Arnie Burton
- Mirjana Joković
- Vanessa A. Jones
- Lisa Masters
- Redman Maxfield
- Jay Potter
- John Pais
- Chris Gethard
- Edmund Ikeda
- Bill Parks
- Marilyn Torres
- Tom Arnold
- James H. Doerr
- Keong Sim
- Tony Curtis
- Jenny McCarthy
- Frank Biancamano
- Samrat Chakrabarti
- Dominic Chianese
- Rebecca Budig
- Cameron Mathison
- Debbi Fuhrman
- Kathleen Goldpaugh
- Dale Radunz
- Bonnie Rose
- Elizabeth Rouse
- Susan Lucci
- Eric Braeden
- Susan Flannery
- Ian Buchanan
- Kevin Cahoon
- John Callahan
- Bobbie Eakes
- Eugene Fleming
- Finola Hughes
- Eva LaRue
- Steve Lurker
- Jim Newman
- John Sloman
- Robert Verdi
- Bob Walton
- Jacob Young
- Chazz Menendez

== Episodes ==
No. overall	No. in season	Title	Directed by	Written by	Original release date	Prod. code	Viewers (millions)
1	1	"Pilot"	Gil Junger	Joanna Johnson	September 26, 2003	101	11.79
Faith Fairfield, star of daytime soap The Sacred & The Sinful, the show which won her an Emmy, has been killed off and is forced to live with her sister Hope and her family in the suburbs. Hope begins to feel that Faith's arrival is turning her family against her. Unable to put up with Faith's disruptive behavior, they have a food and water fight in the middle of the kitchen.
2	2	"Remembrance of Rings Past"	Gil Junger	Jennie Snyder & Victoria Webster	October 3, 2003	102	9.90
Hope and Faith attend their Aunt Dodi's funeral whom they believe stole their mother's heirloom ring. Faith begins to lick her finger to get it off, but then they realize they are at the wrong funeral the woman is not their Aunt Dodi and Faith begins to distract everyone while Hope returns the ring to the woman's finger and accidentally drops her keys in the casket. Hayley begins to think that her parents love her the least as she is the middle child.
3	3	"The Un-Graduate"	Gil Junger	Andrew Kreisberg	October 10, 2003	103	9.50
Faith discovers she never officially graduated from high school, so she must return to school and take French is she is to receive her diploma. Faith tries to help Sydney out with her boyfriend James (Val Emmich) who is a snake in the grass, so she invites him round to the house after school, but James mistakenly thinks that Faith has asked him round on a date.
4	4	"Summary Judgement"	Gil Junger	Joanna Johnson	October 17, 2003	104	9.72
Faith is forced to pay $5000 for burning down the set of The Sacred & The Sinful so she attempts to get various jobs like dressing up in a hot dog suit and not mention pick a fight on the corner. With little luck, she decided to become Hope's assistant by sewing 20 sock monkeys for the children's hospital, trip to the grocery store, pick up dry cleaning. But when disaster strikes the sock monkeys look different and the children fought over them and a worn out Hope fires Faith. So Faith goes to a bar to get $5000 for some guy and Hope follows her and saw that Faith is pawning her Emmy award. At the end of the episodes Faith accidentally broke the crystal.
5	5	"About a Book Club"	Gil Junger	Jessica Kaminsky	October 24, 2003	105	8.87
Faith joins Hope's book club meeting and takes her and her friends on a wild night out to a strip club, with Hope being a spoil sport, Faith begins to call her "boring" and at a drive through, Hope tries to prove she isn't boring by driving off without paying, with them ending up in a jail cell. Charley takes the kids to an arcade.
6	6	"Hope Has No Faith (The Halloween Story)"	Gil Junger	David S. Rosenthal	October 31, 2003	106	7.68
Faith meets her new love interest, Paolo, but Hope seems to think Paolo is living a secret double life. To try to prove she's right, Hope and Faith follow Paolo and it turns out that Hope is exactly right. Hayley has an awkward study date.
7	7	"Car Commercial"	Gil Junger	Taylor Hamra	November 7, 2003	107	10.41
Handsome Hal Halverson asks Faith to star in one of his commercials, for a free car, of course. But what will happen when Hope upstages him? Hal cast the commercial using a donkey to symbolize Faith and the second commercial Faith says shes back as an actress. Will Charley remember his first kiss anniversary with Hope? First appearance of Regis Philbin
8	8	"Hope and Faith Get Randy"	Gil Junger	David S. Rosenthal	November 14, 2003	108	8.66
While out shopping, Hope and Faith bump into Hope's old high school boyfriend, Randy Richter. Sydney and Hayley try to cover up a hole they made in their bedroom wall.
9	9	"Phone Home for the Holidays"	Gil Junger	Kat Likkel & John Hoberg	November 21, 2003	109	9.48
Hope and Faith's father, Jack comes for a visit with his new girlfriend, Summer, who reveals to Hope and Faith that she was kidnapped by Aliens. Jack tests out his masseur skills on a creeped out Charley.
10	10	"Anger Management"	Gil Junger	Mark Driscoll	December 5, 2003	110	8.76
At Juntin's baseball game, with an idea of good sportsmanship, Hope tries to confront overzealous mom, Sue. The ensuing events land Hope and Faith in anger management, to get out of court. The kids try to stop mechanically-challenged Charley from fixing the garbage disposal.
11	11	"Silent Night, Opening Night"	Gil Junger	Jennie Snyder & Victoria Webster	December 12, 2003	111	8.64
Faith thinks she's going back to The Sacred and The Sinful, but her character Ashley Storm has been recast. Faith is disappointed, so Hope suggests she direct Hayley's school play, she agrees but ends up causing chaos.
12	12	"The Wedding"	Gil Junger	Taylor Hamra	January 9, 2004	112	8.98
Charley gets a visit from his family as his brother is about to marry his Swedish fiancée, Astrid. However the following morning, too many drinks leaves Astrid missing and a player in her place.
13	13	"Madam President"	Gil Junger	Mark Driscoll	January 23, 2004	113	8.61
Hope runs for President of the Neighborhood Association, taking Faith on board as her campaign manager. However the plans backfire when they go up against neighbor Harry who threatens to release one of Faith's sexy movies unless Hope backs out of the race.
14	14	"The Diner Show"	Gil Junger	Andrew Kreisberg	February 6, 2004	114	10.76
Faith learns a famous director from Cleveland is coming to Glen Falls and takes Hope along to meet with him at a local diner. However they are forced to become waitresses after they learn that they can't pay for their meals, and to further complicate things, Faith has to compete against another waitress, for the attentions of the director.
15	15	"Mismatch"	Don Scardino	Tom Devanney	February 13, 2004	116	7.95
Faith falls for Kenny, Charley's friend from medical school. However there's a catch that forces Hope to bring Faith on a camping trip. Hayley's crush on Kenny threatens her relationship with Edwin.
16	16	"Charley's Baseball"	Gil Junger	Kat Likkel & John Hoberg	February 20, 2004	115	7.61
Justin accidentally destroys Charley's most prized possession - a baseball autographed by Roger Clemens forcing Hope and Faith to replace it before Charley finds out. Hayley leads a protest against the cutting down of the tree that hold her tree house.
17	17	"Prom and Circumstance (Almost Paradise)"	Gil Junger	Alex Carter	February 27, 2004	117	8.06
Hope and Faith try to help Sydney, resulting in the damage to Charley's vintage convertible. In order to get the repair done before Charley notices, the girls must go the prom with the mechanics, who also happen to have been classmates of theirs with unrequited love.
18	18	"Jury Duty"	Gil Junger	Tod Himmel	March 5, 2004	118	8.18
Hope is selected for jury duty and Faith decided to tag along. However, Faith wreaks havoc in court, even turning herself into a judge.
19	19	"Faith's Maid"	Jerry Zaks	Story by : Taylor Hamra; Teleplay by : Kat Likkel & John Hoberg	March 19, 2004	119	6.87
Olga, Faith's former maid, comes to move in with the family. Hope fires her, but Olga misunderstands and invites her pregnant daughter to join them. Soon, their efforts to find new jobs end up with Hope and Faith working at a club Charley wants to join.
20	20	"Hope Gets a Job"	Gil Junger	Joanna Johnson	April 9, 2004	120	6.82
Hope gets a job as a newspaper columnist at a local paper. Faith decided to apply for the same job and automatically gets it. To shut Faith up, Hope agrees to an office prank by photocopying her boobs and ends up the papers. Sydney tries to cook in conjunction with the Great American Bake sale.
21	21	"Faith's Husband"	Gil Junger	Tod Himmel	April 16, 2004	122	6.86
Faith's Husband, Bob Thompson shows up and when he parks his RV in the driveway, an argument about finalizing their it turns passionate and Faith movies in. Hope and Faith follows Bob to the courthouse and finds that Bob inherits solid gold and diamond encrusted snow globes. At the end Hope promises not to be judgmental.
22	22	"Jack's Back"	Jerry Zaks	David S. Rosenthal	April 30, 2004	121	7.72
Jack returns to be comforted by his daughters after being jilted by his fiancée. Faith tries to set him up with her friend Mandi's mother, but he falls for Mandi instead. When Mandi refuses to end the relationship, Faith tries to teach her a lesson by going out with her father. Hope decides to throw her dad a 70th birthday. When Faith is surprised that Mandi is having sex with Jack, Faith is dating Mandi's dad. Guest Stars: Robert Wagner and Jenny McCarthy.
23	23	"Trade Show"	Don Scardino	Mark Driscoll	May 7, 2004	125	6.86
Faith's obsession with watching episodes for her old soap lead to her replacement and her love interest, Devon, making fun of her on-air. Fed up with this, Charley insists she contributes to the household and makes her find a job. Hope takes her to Irv Miller, a cheesy talent agent who immediately books her to model in a trade show. Hayley and Sydney hatch a scheme for Mother's Day. Faith discovers has been nominated for a Daytime Emmy Award. Guest Star: Susan Lucci
24	24	"Daytime Emmys: Parts 1 & 2"	Gil Junger	Story by : Joanna Johnson; Teleplay by : Jennie Snyder & Victoria Webster	May 14, 2004	123	8.27
25	25	"Daytime Emmys: Parts 1 & 2"	Gil Junger	Story by : Joanna Johnson; Teleplay by : Jennie Snyder & Victoria Webster	May 14, 2004	124	8.27
Faith and her co-stars from the soap are nominated for a Daytime Emmy and flies to New York City with the family for the ceremony. Her mentor, Jacqueline Karr and ex producer Laura Levisetti reveal a secret plan to bring her back and replace her replacement. Jacqueline and Laura also have a plan in mind for her return... Meanwhile, Hope Charley, and the kids rub elbows with the stars. Faith begins to film scenes for her return to the show, but when Jacqueline Karr shoots her character, she think it's a mistake, but she discovers that they only brought her back to kill her off properly. At the award ceremony Faith makes a speech and soon after disappears.

== Award nominations ==
- Young Artist Award for Best Performance in a TV Series (Comedy or Drama) - Young Actress Age Ten or Younger — Macey Cruthird (2004)

== Release ==
=== Critical reception ===
The pilot of Hope & Faith received mixed reviews. Virginia Heffernan of The New York Times praised Ripa's acting, while observing that the series were not sufficiently smart for her. Writing for PopMatters, Michael Abernethy denounced it as formulaic, and billed its humor as "dated and simplistic". Abernethy recognized that it did not reach its potential, despite recognizing that it "is all it needs to be" for the Friday night slot. Variety reviewer Phil Gallo characterised the episode as predictable, "banal and derivative" and criticized its production, as well as McGinley's room.

=== Home release ===
Season 1
Set Details			Special Features
25 episodes; 4-disc set; 1.78:1 aspect ratio; English Dolby Digital 5.1			Blooper Reel; Audio Commentaries; Interviews with Cast and Crew
Release Dates			Blooper Reel; Audio Commentaries; Interviews with Cast and Crew
Region 1	Region 2	Region 4	Blooper Reel; Audio Commentaries; Interviews with Cast and Crew
31 March 2009			Blooper Reel; Audio Commentaries; Interviews with Cast and Crew

== See also ==
- Hope & Faith
- List of Hope & Faith episodes
