= 27th Young Artist Awards =

2006 US media awards ceremony

- Official program
- Awarded for: Achievement in 2005 in film and television
- Date: March 25, 2006
- Site: Sportsmen's Lodge; Studio City, Los Angeles, California
- Hosted by: Drake Bell and Freddie Highmore

The 27th Young Artist Awards ceremony, presented by the Young Artist Association, honored excellence of young performers under the age of 21 in the fields of film and television for the year 2005, and took place on March 25, 2006 at the Sportsmen's Lodge in Studio City, Los Angeles, California.

Established in 1978 by long-standing Hollywood Foreign Press Association member, Maureen Dragone, the Young Artist Association was the first organization to establish an awards ceremony specifically set to recognize and award the contributions of performers under the age of 21 in the fields of film, television, theater and music.

== Categories ==
★ Bold indicates the winner in each category.

== Best Performance in a Feature Film ==
=== Best Performance in a Feature Film - Leading Young Actor ===
★ Josh Hutcherson - Zathura: A Space Adventure - Columbia Pictures

- Adam Butcher - Saint Ralph - Alliance Entertainment
- Freddie Highmore - Charlie and the Chocolate Factory - Warner Bros.
- Taylor Lautner - The Adventures of Sharkboy and Lavagirl in 3-D - Columbia Pictures
- William Moseley - The Chronicles of Narnia: The Lion, the Witch and the Wardrobe - Walt Disney Pictures

=== Best Performance in a Feature Film - Leading Young Actress ===
★ Dakota Fanning - Dreamer - DreamWorks

- Taylor Dooley - The Adventures of Sharkboy and Lavagirl in 3-D - Columbia Pictures
- Jordan-Claire Green - Come Away Home - Haven Films
- Q'Orianka Kilcher - The New World - New Line Cinema
- AnnaSophia Robb - Because of Winn-Dixie - 20th Century Fox

=== Best Performance in a Feature Film - Supporting Young Actor ===
★ Ridge Canipe - Walk the Line - Universal Pictures

- Josh Flitter - The Greatest Game Ever Played - Walt Disney Pictures
- Michael Kanev - Saint Ralph - Alliance Atlantis
- Owen Kline - The Squid and the Whale - American Empirical Pictures
- Steven Anthony Lawrence - Kicking & Screaming - Universal Pictures
- Steven Christopher Parker - Rebound - 20th Century Fox
- Max Thieriot - The Pacifier - Walt Disney Pictures
- Shia LaBeouf - Constantine - Warner Bros. Pictures

=== Best Performance in a Feature Film - Supporting Young Actress ===
★ Suzuka Ohgo - Memoirs of a Geisha - Columbia Pictures

- Aleisha Allen - Are We There Yet? - Columbia Pictures
- Jenna Boyd - The Sisterhood of the Traveling Pants - Warner Bros.
- Alisha Mullally - The 12 Dogs of Christmas - Kragen Productions

=== Best Performance in a Feature Film - Young Actor Age Ten or Younger ===
★ Adrian Alonso - The Legend of Zorro - Columbia Pictures

- Jonah Bobo - Zathura: A Space Adventure - Columbia Pictures
- Philip Bolden - Are We There Yet? - Columbia Pictures

=== Best Performance in a Feature Film - Young Actress Age Ten or Younger ===
★ Georgie Henley - The Chronicles of Narnia: The Lion, the Witch and the Wardrobe - Walt Disney Pictures

- Heidi Hayes - A History of Violence - New Line Cinema
- Chloë Grace Moretz - The Amityville Horror - MGM
- Aria Wallace - The Perfect Man - Universal Pictures

=== Best Performance in a Feature Film - Young Ensemble Cast ===
★ Bad News Bears - Paramount

Seth Adkins, Ridge Canipe, Brandon Craggs, Jeffrey Davies, Timmy Deters, Carlos and Emmanuel Estrada, Troy Gentile, Kenneth "KC" Harris, Aman Johal, Carter Jenkins, Tyler Patrick Jones, Sammi Kane Kraft and Jeffrey Tedmori

- Cheaper by the Dozen 2 - 20th Century Fox

Brent Kinsman, Shane Kinsman, Forrest Landis, Liliana Mumy, Piper Perabo, Kevin Schmidt, Jacob Smith, Alyson Stoner, Blake Woodruff and Morgan York

- Your, Mine and Ours - Paramount

Drake Bell, Dean Collins, Miranda Cosgrove, Jennifer Habib, Jessica Habib, Miki Ishikawa, Lil' JJ, Tyler Patrick Jones, Brecken Palmer, Bridger Palmer, Danielle Panabaker, Ty Panitz, Slade Pearce, Haley Ramm, Nicholas Roget-King and Andrew Vo

== Best Performance in an International Feature Film ==
=== Best Performance in an International Feature Film - Leading Young Performer ===
★ (tie) Marcos Henrique (Brazil) - 2 Filhos de Francisco - Globo Films
★ (tie) Dablio Moreira (Brazil) - 2 Filhos de Francisco - Globo Films

- Barney Clark (England) - Oliver Twist - Runteam II Ltd.
- Matteo Gadola (Italy) - Once You're Born You Can No Longer Hide - Aquarius Films
- Hannah Lochner (England) - Child of Mine - Kudos Productions
- Topi Majaniemi (Finland) - Äideistä parhain - Marila Rohr Productions

== Best Performance in a Short Film ==
=== Best Performance in a Short Film - Young Actor ===
★ Evan Lee Dahl - Christopher Brennan Saves the World - Fresh Face Pictures

- Cody Estes - See Anthony Run - Manpants Films
- Austin Majors - Volare - Sky King Productions
- Calum Worthy - When Jesse was Born - Ginger Pants Productions

=== Best Performance in a Short Film - Young Actress ===
★ Mary Ann Springer - Cleats of Imminent Doom - Curious Productions

- Anna Friedman - The Braggart - David Andalman Productions
- Courtney Halverson - A Distant Shore - Franklin Rho Productions

== Best Performance in a TV Movie, Miniseries or Special ==
=== Best Performance in a TV Movie, Miniseries or Special - Leading Young Actor ===
★ Michael Mitchell - Silver Bells - Hallmark Productions

- Christopher Plumley - The Metro Chase - Legend Family Films
- Jeremy Sumpter - Cyber Seduction: His Secret Life - Lifetime

=== Best Performance in a TV Movie, Miniseries or Special - Leading Young Actress ===
★ Danielle Keaton - American Black Beauty - Fresh Water Entertainment

- Courtney Jines - Silver Bells - Hallmark Productions
- Alexa Vega - Odd Girl Out - Lifetime
- Shailene Woodley - Felicity: An American Girl Adventure - WB

=== Best Performance in a TV Movie, Miniseries or Special - Supporting Young Actor ===
★ Hunter Clary - Snow Wonder - CBS

- Josh Hayden - Deck the Halls - USA Network
- Jake Scott - Cyber Seduction: His Secret Life - Lifetime
- Benjamin B. Smith - Bob the Butler - Disney Channel

=== Best Performance in a TV Movie, Miniseries or Special - Supporting Young Actress ===
★ Niamh Wilson - Haunting Sarah - Lifetime

- Jasmine Berg - Lies My Mother Told Me - Lifetime
- Katie Boland - The Man Who Lost Himself - Lifetime
- Tessa Vonn - Buffalo Dreams - Disney Channel
- Brittney Wilson - Chasing Christmas - ABC

== Best Performance in a TV series ==
=== Best Performance in a TV series - Leading Young Actor (Comedy or Drama) ===
★ Carter Jenkins - Surface - NBC

- Dylan and Cole Sprouse - The Suite Life of Zack & Cody - Disney Channel
- Tyler James Williams - Everybody Hates Chris - UPN

=== Best Performance in a TV series - Leading Young Actress (Comedy or Drama) ===
★ Camille Winbush - The Bernie Mac Show - FOX

- Amy Bruckner - Phil of the Future - Disney Channel
- Hallee Hirsh - Flight 29 Down - NBC

=== Best Performance in a TV series - Supporting Young Actor (Drama) ===
★ Malcolm David Kelley - Lost - ABC

- Spencer Achtymichuk - The Dead Zone USA Network
- Eddie Hassell - Surface - NBC

=== Best Performance in a TV series - Supporting Young Actress (Drama) ===
★ Sofia Vassilieva - Medium - NBC

- Conchita Campbell - The 4400 - USA
- Vivien Cardone - Everwood - WB
- Caitlin Wachs - Commander in Chief - ABC

=== Best Performance in a TV series - Supporting Young Actor (Comedy) ===
★ Angus T. Jones - Two and a Half Men - CBS

- Oliver Davis - Rodney - ABC
- Joel Homan - Yes, Dear - CBS
- Paulie Litt - Hope and Faith - ABC
- Vincent Martella - Everybody Hates Chris - UPN

=== Best Performance in a TV series - Supporting Young Actress (Comedy) ===
★ Renee Olstead - Still Standing - CBS

- Macey Cruthird - Hope and Faith - ABC
- Joy Lauren - Desperate Housewives - ABC

=== Best Performance in a TV series - Young Actor Age Ten or Younger (Comedy or Drama) ===
★ Noah Gray-Cabey - My Wife and Kids - ABC

- Allen Alvarado - Flight 29 Down - NBC
- Connor and Garret Sullivan - According to Jim - ABC
- Drake Johnston - 7th Heaven - WB

=== Best Performance in a TV series - Young Actress Age Ten or Younger (Comedy or Drama) ===
★ Jasmine Jessica Anthony - Commander in Chief - ABC

- Taylor Atelian - According to Jim - ABC
- Billi Bruno - According to Jim - ABC
- Ariel Gade - Invasion - ABC
- Maria Lark - Medium - NBC
- Jazz Raycole - My Wife and Kids - ABC

=== Best Performance in a TV series - Guest Starring Young Actor (Comedy or Drama) ===
★ Joseph Castanon - The Ghost Whisperer - CBS

- Seth Adkins - The West Wing - NBC
- Reed Alexander - Will & Grace - NBC
- Alex Black - Ned's Declassified School Survival Guide - Nickelodeon
- Cole Heppell - The Dead Zone - USA Network
- Masam Holden - Without a Trace - CBS
- Cameron Monaghan - Ned's Declassified School Survival Guide - Nickelodeon
- Tanner Richie - Nip/Tuck - FX
- Cole Evan Weiss - Close to Home - CBS

=== Best Performance in a TV series - Guest Starring Young Actress (Comedy or Drama) ===
★ Darcy Rose Byrnes - The Young and the Restless - CBS

- Courtney Hope - Related - WB
- Kali Majors - Strong Medicine - Lifetime
- Cherrelle Noyd - Judging Amy - CBS
- Ashley Rose Orr - Without a Trace - CBS
- Jennifer Stone - House M.D. - FOX

=== Best Young Ensemble Performance in a TV Series (Comedy or Drama) ===
★ Zoey 101 - Nickelodeon

Sean Flynn Amir, Paul Butcher, Kristin Herrera, Victoria Justice, Christopher Massey, Alexa Nikolas, Erin Sanders, Jamie Lynn Spears and Matthew Underwood

- Darcy's Wild Life - Discovery Kids

Andrew Chalmers, Shannon Collis, Demetrius Joyette, Melanie Leishman, Sara Paxton and Kerry Michael Saxena

- Degrassi: The Next Generation - CTV

Dalmar Abuzeid, Sarah Barrable-Tishauer, John Bregar, Deanna Casaluce, Daniel Clark, Lauren Collins, Ryan Cooley, Marc Donato, Jake Epstein, Stacey Farber, Aubrey Graham, Jake Goldsbie, Shenae Grimes, Jamie Johnston, Shane Kippel, Andrea Lewis, Mike Lobel, Miriam McDonald, Melissa McIntyre, Daniel Morrison, Adamo Ruggiero and Cassie Steele

- Life with Derek - Disney Channel

Ashley Leggat, Daniel Magder, Michael Seater, Jordan Todosey and Ariel Waller

- Unfabulous - Nickelodeon

Jordan Calloway, Bianca Collins, Emma Degerstedt, Dustin Ingram, Malese Jow, Carter Jenkins, Emma Roberts, Brandon Smith and Chelsea Tavares

== Best Performance in a Voice-Over Role ==
=== Best Performance in a Voice-Over Role - Young Actor ===
★ Matthew Josten - Chicken Little - Walt Disney Pictures

- Jake T. Austin - Go, Diego, Go! - Nickelodeon
- Marc Donato - Pom Poko - Disney Home Entertainment

=== Best Performance in a Voice-Over Role - Young Actress ===
★ Tajja Isen - Atomic Betty - Cartoon Network

- Sarah Heinke - Strawberry Shortcake - Dic Entertainment
- Brenda Grate - Tarzan II - Walt Disney Animation

== Best Family Entertainment ==
=== Best Family Television Movie or Special ===
★ Silver Bells - Hallmark

- Felicity: An American Girl Adventure - WB
- Go Figure - Disney Channel
- Pope John Paul II - CBS
- Riding the Bus with My Sister - Hallmark

=== Best Family Television Series (Drama) ===
★ Surface - NBC

- Flight 29 Down - NBC
- Strong Medicine - Lifetime
- Sue Thomas: FB Eye - KPXN

=== Best Family Television Series (Comedy) ===
★ Everybody Hates Chris - UPN

- According to Jim - ABC
- Hope & Faith - ABC
- Rodney - ABC
- That's So Raven - Disney Channel

=== Best International Family Feature Film ===
★ Saint Ralph - Canada

- Äideistä parhain (Mother of Mine) - Finland
- Mrs. Palfrey at the Claremont - England
- Oliver Twist - England
- Once You're Born You Can No Longer Hide - Italy
- 2 Filhos de Francisco (Two Sons of Francisco) - Brazil

=== Best Family Feature Film - Animation ===
★ Wallace & Gromit: The Curse of the Were-Rabbit - DreamWorks/Aardman

- Howl's Moving Castle - Buena Vista Pictures
- Pooh's Heffalump Movie - Walt Disney Pictures
- Robots - 20th Century Fox
- Tim Burton's Corpse Bride - Warner Bros.
- Valiant - Vanguard Animation

=== Best Family Feature Film - Comedy or Musical ===
★ Charlie and the Chocolate Factory - Warner Bros.

- Because of Winn-Dixie - 20th Century Fox
- Bewitched - Columbia Pictures
- Rebound - 20th Century Fox
- Sky High - Walt Disney Pictures
- Yours, Mine and Ours - Paramount/MGM/Nickelodeon/Columbia

=== Best Family Feature Film - Drama ===
★ The Chronicles of Narnia: The Lion, the Witch and the Wardrobe - Walt Disney Pictures

- Cinderella Man - Universal
- Dreamer: Inspired by a True Story - DreamWorks
- Finding Home - Castle Hill Productions
- Legend of Zorro - Columbia Pictures
- Memoirs of a Geisha - Universal
- The Sisterhood of the Traveling Pants - Warner Bros.

== Special awards ==
=== Outstanding Young Family Singing Group ===
★ The Von Trapp Children

=== Michael Landon Award ===
==== Outstanding Contribution to Youth in Entertainment ====
★ Hunter Gomez

=== Outstanding Young Musician ===
★ Andrew Tang - Concert Pianist

=== Former Child Star - Life Achievement Award ===
★ Victoria Paige Meyerink

=== Social Relations of Knowledge Institute Award ===
★ MythBusters - Discovery Channel

=== Jackie Coogan Award ===
==== Outstanding Family Feature Documentary ====
★ March of the Penguins

=== Jackie Coogan Award ===
==== Outstanding Youth Feature Documentary ====
★ Mad Hot Ballroom

=== Best Original Song ===
★ Tony Renis - "Christmas in Love"

=== Outstanding International Drama ===
★ The Wedding Chest - Producer: Yevgeniya Tirdatova
