= Come Away Home =

- film poster
- Directed by: Doug McKeon
- Written by: Stephen Zakman
- Produced by: Gregg Russell; Robert D. Slane
- Starring: Jordan-Claire Green; Macey Cruthird; Will Denton; Lea Thompson; Thomas Gibson; Paul Dooley; Martin Mull; Kristen Renton
- Cinematography: Jeff Baustert
- Edited by: Gillian L. Hutshing
- Music by: Mark Chait
- Production companies: Stephen M. Zakman Productions; Haven Films Inc; High Tide Entertainment
- Distributed by: American Family Movies; Empire Home Ent.; Hannover House
- Release date: April 29, 2005
- Running time: 102 minutes
- Country: United States
- Language: English

Come Away Home is a 2005 American family drama film directed by Doug McKeon, and written by Stephen Zakman, and later the inspiration for the novel of the same name by Robert D. Slane. The film stars Jordan-Claire Green as Annie Lamm, Lea Thompson and Thomas Gibson as her parents, and Paul Dooley as her grandfather. The film had theatrical release April 29, 2005, and was released to DVD February 5, 2008.

== Plot ==
While she had planned to spend her summer in New York, Annie Lamm's (Jordan-Claire Green) parents Carol (Lea Thompson) and Gary (Thomas Gibson) force her to spend the summer with her grandfather Donald (Paul Dooley) in Hilton Head, South Carolina. She hates being forced and thinks her summer is ruined, but after her effort to sneak back to New York was stymied, and after nearly drowning in his rickety old boat and then being rescued, she develops a greater appreciation for both her grandfather and the island where he lives. When summer comes to the end, she learns her parents intend placing her grandfather in a retirement home, and she has to convince them otherwise.

== Cast ==
- Jordan-Claire Green as Annie Lamm
- Macey Cruthird as Holly
- Will Denton as Jason
- Lea Thompson as Carol Lamm
- Thomas Gibson as Gary Lamm
- Paul Dooley as Grandpa Donald Brooks
- Martin Mull as Barney Green
- Doug McKeon as Woodsy Warner
- Kristen Renton as Ashley Green
- Asher Monroe as Chris
- Michael Rae as Chris' Brother
- Sonya Eddy as Sonya Warfield
- David Keith as Sheriff Steve Jantz
- Gregg Russell as Bearded Man
- Jimmy Walsh as Doug
- Kris Crevani as Teacher
- Sal Catalano as Lance Shoals
- Zach Hanks as Deputy Rob Reed

== Reception ==
Pittsburgh City Paper noted that the film "never probes its dysfunctional family roots very deep, preferring instead to present a winsome if not entirely realistic portrait of a simple summer that can change a dozen lives for the better," and concluded the film's "lessons about sharing, family and resolving life's woes are well intended, if a little well worn." Savannah Morning News generally praised the project, writing it was "a remarkably well made film that underscores the importance of family and should make Hilton Head residents proud of their hometown". Atlanta Journal-Constitution also praised, writing “Some of the acting was unprofessional but [it is] otherwise a great family movie to watch with your kids.”

=== Accolades ===
- 2006: received Young Artist Awards nomination for 'Best Performance in a Feature Film (Comedy or Drama) - Leading Young Actress' for Jordan-Claire Green
