= Anger management (disambiguation) =

Anger management is a psychotherapeutic technique.

Anger Management may also refer to:

- Anger Management (film), a 2003 comedy film starring Adam Sandler and Jack Nicholson
- Anger Management (TV series), a 2012 FX TV series based on the film
- "The Anger Management", an episode of the television series, The O.C.
- Anger Management Tour, a series of Eminem concert tours
- Anger Management, an album by rapper Luni Coleone
- Anger Management (mixtape), by rapper Rico Nasty and producer Kenny Beats
- "Anger Management" (Hope & Faith), from the first season of the American sitcom
- "Anger Management", by Psy'Aviah from Eclectric
- Anger Management, an album by rapper Dax

== See also ==
- Anger (disambiguation)
