= Will Denton =

American actor (born 1990)

- Born: February 4, 1990 (age 36); Brookfield, Connecticut, U.S.
- Occupation: Actor
- Years active: 2003–2017

Will Denton (born February 4, 1990) is an American former film and television actor. He started his career as a child actor in 2003, and his last appearance was an adult supporting role in the 2017 film The Post. He may be best known for his main cast role as Leopold Cain, in the 2006–07 series Kidnapped.

== Acting ==
Best known for playing the role of Leopold Cain in the single season of the television series Kidnapped (2006), his credits also include the films Robots (2005), Palindromes (2004), Kinsey (2004), and The Post (2017).

He appeared in Camp Hope, a horror film starring Dana Delany (his on-screen mother in Kidnapped).

Other television credits include Law & Order and Ed.

His final screen appearance was a minor role in the 2017 political thriller The Post.

== Design and technology ==
In 2017, Denton left acting when he founded design and technology company Channel Studio, based in New York City; the company has completed projects for The New York Times, Microsoft, the Nobel Foundation, and others.

Denton also holds non-tenure teaching positions at the Yale School of Art and the Parsons School of Design.

== Filmography ==
note: feature film, unless otherwise noted

Year	Film/TV	Role	Notes
2003	Ed	Glenn	Episode: "Captain Lucidity"
2004	Palindromes	'Huckleberry' Aviva	
2004	Kinsey	Kinsey at 10	
2005	Robots	Young Rodney	voice role
2005	Hope & Faith	Brent	Episode: "The Gooch"
2006–2007	Kidnapped	Leopold Cain	Main cast
2008	Law & Order	Jason Lortell	Episode: "Angelgrove"
2010	Capture the Flag	Justin Mason	
2010	Camp Hope	Tommy Leary	
2011	Fright Night	Adam	
2014	The Blacklist	Harrison Lee	Episode: "Ivan"
2017	The Post	Michael	
