= See Anthony Run =

- Directed by: Matthew Piacentini
- Written by: Matthew Piacentini; Tom Pope
- Produced by: Matthew Piacentini; James Keitel; Greg G. Reeves
- Starring: Cody Estes; Rhett Damon; Jennette McCurdy; Eliza Coyle; Gwen Holloway; Jonathan Redford
- Cinematography: James Zucal
- Edited by: Travis Sittard
- Music by: Alec Puro; Ryan Rehm
- Release date: October 9, 2005
- Running time: 17 minutes
- Country: United States
- Language: English

See Anthony Run (alternate title: The Sleepover) is a 2005 short film co-written and directed by Matthew Piacentini, a production assistant on the 1993–2005 ABC police drama NYPD Blue. It stars Cody Estes as a shy 10-year-old boy forced into a sleepover with a school bully, played by Rhett Damon. Jennette McCurdy plays Lucy, the bully's older sister.

== Plot ==
Anthony (no surname given) is forced into a sleepover by his mother in order to help him make friends. The trouble is, the "friend" his mother makes him spend the night with is a bully named Craig Randall. As he enters the house, his mother turns her car radio on, and hears a news report about a rash of kidnappings of children who were found alive tied up in duct tape.

For the most part, Craig is persistently hostile towards Anthony. His mother spends time preparing unappetizing meals that are supposed to be healthy, such as homemade tofu squares, fish heads, and spring garden loaf. On some occasions it seems that Craig is ready to become more friendly towards him when they find a shared interest in toys, video games, slime, etcetera, but then resumes his hostility.

Anthony's older brother John, is a burnout who spends time with his idiotic girlfriend Jill, and his friends who are plotting to steal a parking meter and break into it for the money, presumably for drugs. Background music during his scenes consist of classic rock from Steely Dan, Jethro Tull, Blue Öyster Cult and The Grateful Dead. When Anthony tries to call him to come and pick him up, he refuses believing that his little brother should learn to be more sociable.

At dinner the rest of the family eats foods that Anthony finds unappealing. Craig's mother boasts of Lucy's upcoming role in a school production of Chicago, despite the fact that she's in the middle of a conversation. When Craig and Lucy's father notices that Anthony doesn't like fish heads, he suggests ordering a pizza, which shocks every other family member.

Before preparing for bed, Anthony walks in on Craig's sister, who he finds is using his toothbrush to brush her teeth. She compares it to kissing, then explains that she's fond of him because he upsets her brother as well as the rest of the family dynamic, sneaks a kiss on his lips and then runs to bed. Craig accuses Anthony of "trying to sex his sister," and threatens to either tell his parents or kill him in his sleep. Desperate to escape, he calls home again, but both his mother and his brother insist that he should stay the night. His mother suggests that the only way he can come home is if he asks Craig's parents to give him the ride, but when he tries to do so, he sees them on the verge of intimacy with each other.

Much to his surprise, his big brother has come to the rescue. John is convinced that by doing this he missed an opportunity for a sexual tryst with his girlfriend, but when Anthony informs him about the kiss he got from Lucy, he thinks he might have a chance with his girlfriend after all. Before they return home, he leaves a note on the Randall's kitchen window, which Mrs. Randall misinterprets as another kidnapping by the Duct Tape Gang. Police and news reporters surround the house, while Anthony sleeps safely at home on the couch.

== Cast ==
- Cody Estes: Anthony
- Rhett Damon: Craig Randall
- Jennette McCurdy: Lucy Randall
- Eliza Coyle: Mrs. Randall
- Joel Murray: Jeff Randall
- Jonathan Redford: John
- Alex Thayer: Jill
- Gwen Holloway: Anthony's Mom
- Susan Chuang: Reporter
- Andy Goldberg: Radio Announcer

== Awards and acclaim ==
Cody Estes was given a 2006 Young Artist Award nomination; Best Performance in a Short Film - Leading Young Actor. A link to the film from Spike TV's website that was added to a Jennette McCurdy fansite has also increased attention to the movie, and praise for McCurdy.
