= Paulie Litt =

American actor and producer (born 1995)

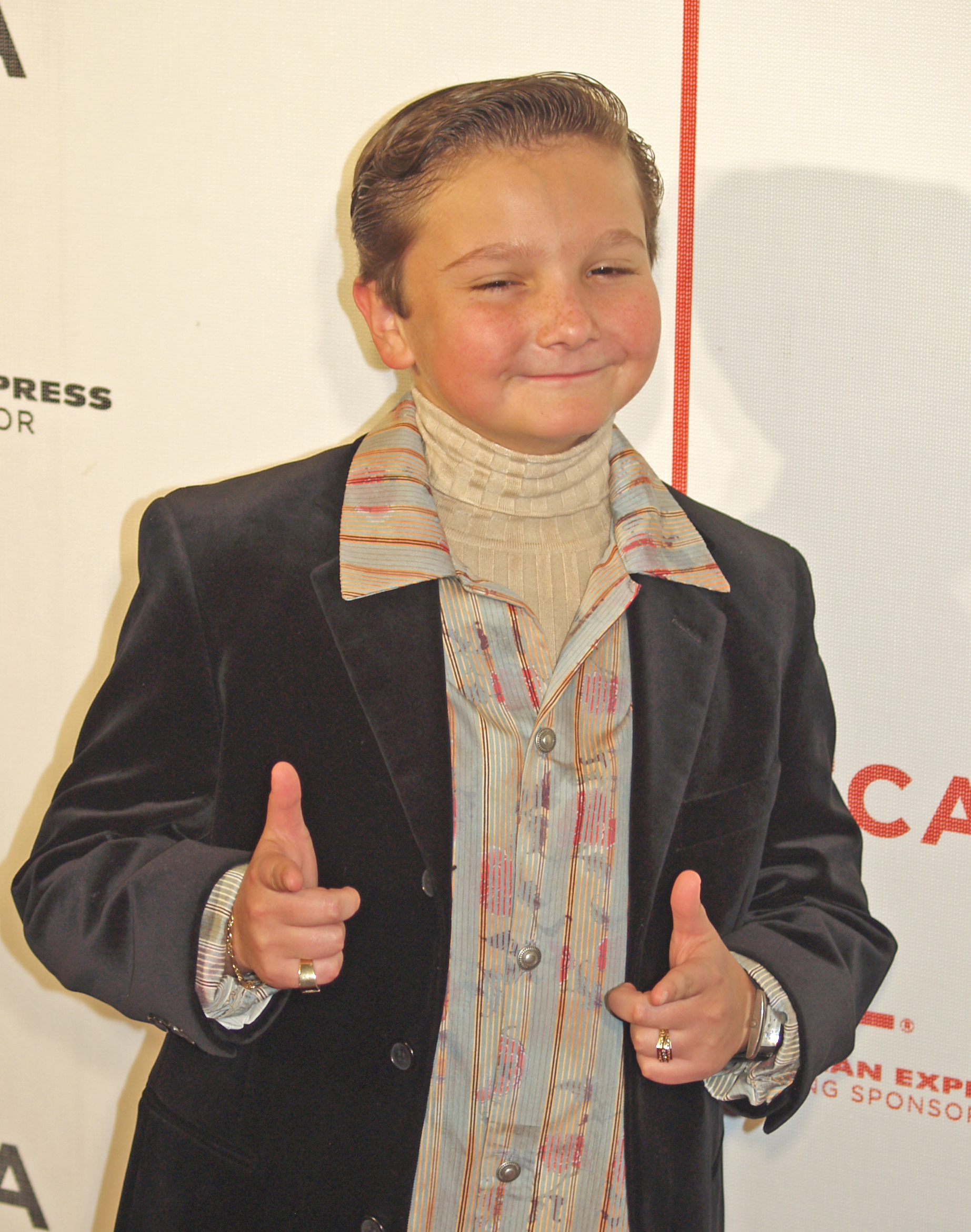
- Litt at the premiere of Speed Racer at the 2008 Tribeca Film Festival
- Born: Paul Litowsky; April 17, 1995 (age 31); New Jersey, United States
- Occupation: Actor
- Years active: 2002–2017

Paul Litowsky (born April 17, 1995), known professionally as Paulie Litt, is an American former child actor and producer. He is best known for his role as Justin Shanowski on the sitcom Hope & Faith.

== Career ==
Litt was raised in Freehold Township, New Jersey. He made his television debut on an episode of Third Watch. In 2003, he was cast in the role of Justin Shanowski, on the ABC sitcom Hope & Faith, which he played for all three seasons. At the time, Regis Philbin, who worked with his Hope & Faith co-star Kelly Ripa, described him as a forty-year old caught in a five-year old's body. He had a recurring role in the Disney Channel series Wizards of Waverly Place.

In 2006, he was nominated for the award for the Best Performance in a TV series – Supporting Young Actor (Comedy) at the 27th Young Artist Awards for his performance on Hope & Faith, which was won by Angus T. Jones. His co-stars Megan Fox and Macey Cruthird were also nominated for the female version of the award in 2005 and 2006 respectively.

He made his film debut in the 2004 Kevin Smith comedy Jersey Girl starring Ben Affleck. In 2008, he played Spritle Racer in Speed Racer, as well as the accompanying video game. He also appeared in Doubt (2008).

He has appeared in over 26 commercials. Early in his career, he appeared in commercials for Oreos and ex-lax. He has been in Apple's "Get a Mac" television commercials as the 'Young PC' that starred John Hodgman and Justin Long.

He made his debut as a producer in the short film The Day I Finally Killed Myself as an Associate Producer. He made his production debut in a feature film in 2016 in The Book of Love starring Jason Sudeikis.

After leaving the entertainment industry, he co-founded a high-end yarn producing company called Harvest Produce Retail.

== Filmography ==
=== Television ===
Year	Title	Role	Notes
2002	Third Watch	Boy One	Episode: "Old Dogs, New Tricks"
2003–2006	Hope & Faith	Justin Shanowski	Main Role, 44 Episodes; Nominated – Best Performance in a TV series – Supporting Young Actor (Comedy) (2006)
2004	Late Night with Conan O'Brien	Self	Episode: "February 24, 2004"
2008	Live with Regis and Kelly	Self	Episode: "May 14, 2008"
2008	Turbo Dates		Episode: "Junior de Bergerac"
2007–2010	Wizards of Waverly Place	Frankie/Joey	Episode: "New Employee" (2007); Episode: "Curb Your Dragon" (2007); Episode: "Dad's Buggin' Out" (2010)
2009, 2015	The League	Matt Friedman "The Oracle"	Episode: "The Draft" (2009); Episode: "The Great Night of Shiva" (2015)
2026	Through the Woods	Paulie	Mini-series, also Creator, Writer, and Producer

=== Films ===
Year	Title	Role	Notes
2004	Jersey Girl	Bryan	
2004	Eternal Sunshine of the Spotless Mind	Young Bully	
2008	Speed Racer	Spritle Racer	
2008	Doubt	Tommy Conroy	
2013	The Lifeguard	Lumpy	
2013	The Day I Finally Decided to Kill Myself	Marty	Short film, also Associate Producer
2016	Here Comes Rusty	College	
2017	Sex Guaranteed	Chase	also Associate Producer

=== Video games ===
Year	Title	Role	Notes
2008	Speed Racer Crucible Challenge DVD Game	Spritle	

=== Producer ===
Year	Title	Producer	Notes
2013	The Day I Finally Killed Myself	Associate	Short film, Also Actor
2016	The Book of Love	Co-producer	
2017	Sex Guaranteed	Associate	Also Actor

== Awards ==
Year	Result	Award	Category	Work
2006	Nominated	Young Artist Awards	Best Performance in a TV Series (Comedy): Supporting Young Actor	Hope & Faith
