= J.D. (Scrubs) =

Fictional character from Scrubs

John Dorian (J.D.)
- Scrubs character
- First appearance: "My First Day" (2001)
- Created by: Bill Lawrence
- Portrayed by: Zach Braff (adult); Cody Estes (young)

In-universe information
- Full name: John Michael Dorian, M.D.
- Nicknames: J.D., Johnny, Newbie, Scooter, Vanilla Bear, Bambi, Q-tip, Oldie, and a variety of girls' names
- Gender: Male
- Title: Chief of Medicine
- Occupation: Doctor of internal medicine at Sacred Heart Hospital
- Family: Sam Dorian (deceased father); Barbara Hobbs Dorian (mother); Dan Dorian (brother); Nana Hobbs (maternal grandmother); Grandma Dorian (deceased paternal grandmother); Dr. Simon Reid (father-in-law); Lily Reid (mother-in-law); Dr. Barry Reid (brother-in-law); Dr. Bradley Reid (brother-in-law)
- Spouse: Elliot Reid (ex-wife)
- Children: Sam Perry Gilligan Dorian (with Kim Briggs); Ollie Dorian (with Elliot)

John Michael "J.D." Dorian, M.D., is a fictional character and the protagonist of the 2001–2010 comedy-drama television series Scrubs and its 2026 revival series.

Portrayed by Zach Braff, J.D. acts as the narrator and main character of the original series from seasons one to eight, providing voice-overs that reveal his internal thoughts, often linking the story arcs in each episode.

J.D. appears in every episode during the first eight seasons, except for two in season 8: "My Absence," in which he is briefly heard through a mobile phone, and "My Full Moon". He later returns as a major character for six episodes of the ninth season. Braff also briefly portrayed the character in the webisode spin-off series Scrubs: Interns and the Muppets television film It's a Very Merry Muppet Christmas Movie.

He returns in the 2026 revival series, where he is now divorced from Elliot and is appointed Chief of Medicine by Dr. Cox.

Both the character and Braff's performance were positively received. Braff was nominated for the Primetime Emmy Award for Outstanding Lead Actor in a Comedy Series in 2005 and received three consecutive Golden Globe Award for Best Actor – Television Series Musical or Comedy nominations from 2005 to 2007.

== Character background ==
J.D.'s name is based on that of Dr. Jonathan Doris, a college friend of series creator Bill Lawrence. Doris served as a medical advisor on the show.

Zach Braff, the actor who portrayed the character in the series, said, "I feel that, after seven years, there is not much of J.D.'s personality left to be explored, except for his relationship with best friend Christopher Turk." Braff also opined that although "J.D. has gradually evolved over the series, he also cannot evolve too much, as we need to give the fans what they want, which is to see the characters be themselves." Meanwhile, the show creator, Bill Lawrence stated that the seventh season was required, in order to show J.D. finally growing up, as many fans did not want to see him stay the same.

In a 2008 interview, Braff stated that while he feels "most at home when I’m playing a Jewish character," the writers for Scrubs chose to imply that Dorian was Christian because the show needed "to appeal to the most massive audience possible" out of concern that some people might not watch a show featuring a Jewish main character.

== Fictional character biography ==
=== Personality ===
J.D.'s most prominently featured quirk is his habit of daydreaming. When this happens, he tilts his head back and to his left, blankly looking upwards. The sequences played out in his daydreams are often surreal or about the situations that have just been mentioned or wondered about, but often in an exaggerated manner. Many of these are followed by a comment from him which, although in keeping with his daydream, sounds strange and is often highly unrelated to the initial topic, very often earning him odd looks from nearby characters in the scene. Then he gives a concluding comment, which others are clueless about.

Despite his numerous mistakes, quirks, and personal neurosis, J.D. is shown throughout the series to be a very skilled doctor. He is described as having compassion for his patients, as well as determination and enthusiasm for his job.

=== Family life ===
J.D. grew up in Trotwood, Ohio, a suburb of Dayton. In a Season 1 episode (2001), J.D. states that 20 years ago, he "had a little trouble with his S's" because he was five. In season five J.D. turns 30.

His father, Sam (John Ritter), a failed office supply salesman, was absent for most of J.D.'s childhood and often mooched off his son when he was around; after Sam dies, however, J.D. realizes that his father loved him and was proud of him. His mother is Barbara Turner Dorian. He has an older brother, Dan (Tom Cavanagh), with whom he has a love/hate relationship.

=== Work ===
J.D. begins the show as an intern at Sacred Heart Hospital. After a year, he becomes a resident, then an attending physician in internal medicine, and eventually residency director of St. Albert’s, so he can be around his son full time.

J.D. begins work at Sacred Heart under Attending Physician Dr. Perry Cox (John C. McGinley), who generally refers to J.D. as "Newbie" or by a variety of girls' names. J.D. thinks of Cox as his mentor, which Cox adamantly denies. As much as he hates to admit it, however, Cox respects J.D. as a doctor and even cares about him as a person, even offering him personal advice on a few occasions. J.D.'s faith in Cox is shaken when the latter has a breakdown following the death of three patients. After a deeply depressed Cox shows up to work drunk, J.D. refuses to see him, claiming that he does not approve of Cox's behavior. However, he later confesses to Cox that he still looks upon him as a hero and admires him for caring so much about his patients that he takes it hard when things go badly for them. At the end of the episode, Cox thanks J.D. — and, atypically, calls him by his real name — for helping him forgive himself and get on with his life. After Cox is promoted to Chief of Medicine in Season 8, he and J.D. are often at odds over hospital matters, mirroring Cox's relationship with the former chief, Dr. Bob Kelso (Ken Jenkins), in earlier seasons. Kelso advises J.D. that he is the one who will have to press for hospital matters if they are important enough, even if it means fighting Cox to do it. On J.D.'s last day at Sacred Heart, Cox finally admits that J.D. is an exceptional physician, an exceptional person, and a friend — albeit only when he thinks J.D. is not around to hear it.

J.D. is also engaged in a constant battle with the Janitor (Neil Flynn) from the very first episode. The Janitor is trying to open a jammed door when J.D. suggests there may be a penny stuck in it. When it turns out that there is a penny stuck in the door, the Janitor vows revenge. Throughout the series, the Janitor frequently plays tricks and pranks on J.D. In the eighth-season finale, it is revealed that J.D. did accidentally put the penny in the door. The Janitor saw him drop the penny, but because he never admitted it, decided that J.D. had failed a "test of character," thus igniting their feud.

J.D. leaves Sacred Heart for a job at another hospital (St. Vincent) where Kim works in order to be closer to his son, Sam.

In Season 9, J.D. becomes a visiting professor at Winston University, a medical school built on the old site of Sacred Heart, which has been torn down. He forms a bond with the series' new main character, Lucy Bennett (Kerry Bishé), whom he counsels through the rigors of life as a doctor. After a few months, however, he tells her that he eventually plans to move on, and that she must find a new mentor before he leaves. Finally, he leaves his teaching position and steps back from mentoring Lucy, determined that she must learn to function on her own. After being a concierge doctor, J.D. returns to Sacred Heart and replaces Dr. Cox as Chief of Medicine in season 10.

=== Friends ===
He often spends time with Chris Turk (Donald Faison), his best friend and surrogate brother, whom he first met when they were roommates at the College of William and Mary in Williamsburg, Virginia. The pair continue to be roommates even as they progress to become interns and then residents. J.D. is often shown to have a codependent relationship with Turk, regularly going through some stages of depression whenever he cannot be with him. By their own admission, their relationship is a "bromance." In the first episode, when Turk suggests the two of them seek separate apartments to "branch out," J.D.'s inner monologue tells himself to "Tell him you think that's stupid. Tell him you need him," but they end up roommates again by the episode's end. Their friendship is often depicted as being closer and more loving than a marriage; they sum up their feelings in the song "Guy Love": "It's guy love / That's all it is / It's guy love / He's mine, I'm his / There's nothing gay about it in our eyes."

On his first day, he also meets Carla Espinosa (Judy Reyes), a nurse who looks out for him and affectionately nicknames him "Bambi." On his last day at Sacred Heart, she reveals that she calls him this because he "needed to learn how to walk" (meaning to become a doctor).

=== Romantic history ===
He meets and forms a connection with Elliot Reid (Sarah Chalke) in the pilot episode and finds himself attracted to her. In seasons 1 to 3, a running joke in the series was that J.D. would sleep with Elliot at least once in each season, although the show's producers have indicated that this ended to prevent the characters' development being constrained by clichés. The two form a romantic relationship in the first season, but their romance quickly falls apart when they realize that they do not work as a couple.

He has had romantic and sexual liaisons with various women besides Elliot, including Dr. Cox's ex-wife Jordan Sullivan (Christa Miller), and Jordan's younger sister Danni Sullivan (Tara Reid). In season five, he meets Dr. Kim Briggs (Elizabeth Banks), the hospital's urologist, and they are immediately attracted to each other. They go on a date that ends with J.D. getting her pregnant via premature ejaculation. In season 6, they decide to keep the child and try to make a relationship work, but they break up when Kim announces that she had a miscarriage. Soon afterward, however, J.D. discovers that she is still pregnant, having lied about losing the baby to get out of the relationship. He decides to stay with her for the sake of their child. J.D. realises that he does not love her, and they break up for good while she is giving birth to their son, Sam Perry Gilligan Dorian.

While J.D. and Elliot had an on-and-off romance throughout the series, it is not until the conclusion of Season 6 that they appear ready to get back together. The episode "My Point of No Return" ends with J.D. and Elliot lying on a bed in the on-call room, leaning in for a kiss. The action remains unresolved until Season 7, when Elliot backs out. They both then say that the almost-kiss had nothing to do with their feelings for each other. In Season 8, they become a couple again after they talk about their history together, and Dr. Kelso advises them to do whatever makes them happy.

During the filming for Season 8, Sarah Chalke said in an interview that she could not imagine J.D. and Elliot not being together romantically. In the Season 8 finale, it is suggested through a flash forward in the style of a home movie that J.D. and Elliot will marry and have a child.

In Season 9, it is revealed that J.D. and Elliot are in fact married and expecting a child. This is punctuated by an extremely awkward morning ritual in front of Elliot's class where J.D. kisses her stomach for every month she is pregnant and says "and thank you for making mommy's boobs bigger"; Elliot then puts her breasts on his head. At the end of the season they go on a "babymoon", a romantic getaway for expecting parents. In the revival series, J.D. says that he and Elliot are now divorced. They have a son together, Ollie.

== Cameos in other media ==
Like Elliot, Carla, Cox and the Janitor, the J.D. character makes a cameo appearance in It's a Very Merry Muppet Christmas Movie, trying to reanimate Miss Piggy. However, Piggy and the Scrubs cast finally break the fourth wall, with the actors portraying themselves.

In 2012, the final scene of the Cougar Town season 3 episode "A One Story Town" features an uncredited cameo by Braff as a pizza delivery boy, whom returning Scrubs character Ted Buckland recognises as being physically identical to J.D. (alongside recognising several other Cougar Town characters as resembling their actors' other Scrubs characters).

In 2014, in the fifth-season premiere of the NBC television comedy series Community, a narration by J.D. (Braff) from a ninth-season episode of Scrubs is used to provide a voice-over summary. Earlier in the episode, "Repilot", Braff is mentioned in reference to the unpopular ninth season of Scrubs, to which the characters involved mock for the appearance of Braff in a mere six episodes of the semi-reboot (which itself also served as a meta-commentary on the fact that Donald Glover would also only be appearing in five episodes of the similarly semi-rebooted Community).
