= Camp Hell =

- Directed by: George VanBuskirk
- Written by: George VanBuskirk
- Starring: Bruce Davison; Dana Delany; Will Denton; Jesse Eisenberg; Andrew McCarthy; Connor Paolo
- Cinematography: Michael McDonough
- Edited by: David Leonard, Misako Shimzu
- Music by: Gary DeMichele
- Production company: Holedigger Films
- Distributed by: Lionsgate
- Release date: August 13, 2010
- Running time: 99 minutes
- Country: United States
- Language: English

Camp Hell is a 2010 American horror film starring Will Denton, Dana Delany, Andrew McCarthy, Bruce Davison and Jesse Eisenberg. The film was previously titled Camp Hope. It was released August 13, 2010 in the United States.

== Plot ==
By the end of each summer, children from the fundamentalist Catholic community in the suburbs of New Jersey visited Camp Hope. Deep in the woods, away from civilization, the children are taught the ways of Christianity, the temptations of the flesh, and the horror of Satan. The head priest, who teaches the children these doctrines of fundamentalist Catholicism, has unknowingly brought evil with him by solely focusing on sin instead of salvation. The priest fills these young minds with the belief that everything they do is a sin. The priest also goes so far as to call a girl at the camp a whore because she was talking to a male member of the camp. The presence of a demon starts to creep into the minds of the children, especially the main character, Tommy Leary.

Tommy's grandfather had recently died and the afterlife is very much on his mind. At the same time, his innocent relationship with his childhood crush slowly becomes more physical until the two escape into the woods for a sexual encounter. Melissa, his crush, is caught and sent home, allowing the priest to focus on Tommy. The priest takes Tommy down a psychological and spiritual path that makes the presence of the demon real to him, and it begins to haunt him.

The movie ends with Tommy, after a confrontation with the priest and a near suicide attempt. The priest, after his emotionally brutal encounter with Tommy in his cabin, suffers a stroke. The members of the community struggle over whether to pull the plug, hoping for a miracle, while the priest spends the rest of his life in a persistent vegetative state, eyes wide open, with a look of horror on his face.

On the way home from the hospital, Tommy finds a note given to him earlier by Melissa telling him when he can find her and be with her. As the car drives on, he opens the window and throws out the copy of Dante's Inferno, which falls open on the road to a picture of a demon.

== Cast ==
- Bruce Davison as Fr. Phineas McAllister
- Will Denton as Tommy Leary
- Christopher Denham as Christian
- Connor Paolo as Jack
- Valentina de Angelis as Melissa
- Spencer Treat Clark as Timothy
- Dana Delany as Patricia Leary
- Andrew McCarthy as Michael Leary
- Jesse Eisenberg as Daniel Jacobs
- Drew Powell as Bob
- James McCaffrey as Dr. John
- Sasha Neulinger as Jimmy
- Caroline London as Rose Leary
- Ryan Knowles as Demon
- Ato Essandoh as Young Priest
- Chris Northrop as Death Metal Kid
- Joseph Vincent Cordaro as Ryan

== Release ==
The film was released in the United States on August 13, 2010. Lionsgate released the film on DVD in the United States in 2011.

== Lawsuit ==
Jesse Eisenberg filed a lawsuit against Lionsgate Entertainment and Grindstone Entertainment for trying to fraudulently capitalize on his fame by using his name and face to promote a movie in which he was largely absent. Legal documents state:

"Eisenberg is bringing this lawsuit in order to warn his fans and public that, contrary to the manner in which the defendants are advertising the film, Eisenberg is not the star of and does not appear in a prominent role in Camp Hell, but instead has a cameo role in Camp Hell."

Eisenberg asked for damages of at least US$3 million. In June 2012 he won a preliminary in the case with the judge stating: "The content of the materials was commercial, by virtue of proposing a commercial transaction, despite perhaps falsely leading the consumer to believe that [Eisenberg] is the star of the film. (...) The court thus finds that the speech at issue in this case constitutes commercial speech, which is not subject to protection under [the anti-SLAPP law]."

== Reception ==
Nigel Floyd, writing for Time Out said that "budgetary limitations, a plodding script, ropey visual effects and an excruciating score undercut a heartfelt cautionary tale about a confused teenager wrestling with his religious faith and the dogmatism of his overzealous elders."

Rich Cline, in a review for Shadows on the Wall said that "the grounded approach and honest performances are provocative and unsettling. As is the fact that it's based on a true story."
