= Chris Northrop =

American actor

Chris Northrop is an American actor. He is best known for playing the recurring role Meth-Head Charlie in the Netflix Original Series Unbreakable Kimmy Schmidt. TV credits include Gotham, Law & Order: SVU, Ugly Betty, The Mysteries of Laura, What Would You Do?, Broad City and High Maintenance. Northrop has also appeared in the feature films Unbreakable Kimmy Schmidt: Kimmy vs the Reverend, Baked in Brooklyn and Camp Hell.

== Filmography ==
Film
Year	Title	Role
2020	Unbreakable Kimmy Schmidt: Kimmy vs the Reverend (TV Movie)	Meth-Head Charlie
2016	Baked in Brooklyn	Sean
2010	Camp Hell	Death Metal Kid

Television
Year	Title	Role	Notes
2022	Bull (2016 TV series)	Gruff Dude	Co-Star - 1 Episode: "Goodbye"
2016-2019	Unbreakable Kimmy Schmidt	Meth-Head Charlie	Recurring - 9 Episodes - "Kimmy Drives a Car!", "Kimmy Meets a Drunk Lady!", "Kimmy Goes to Her Happy Place!", "Kimmy Meets a Celebrity!", "Kimmy Can't Help You!", "Kimmy's Roommate Lemonades!", "Kimmy Pulls Off a Heist!" (photo only), "Sliding Van Doors" and "Kimmy Says Bye!"
2016	Gotham	Paranoid Inmate / Loonie #2	Recurring - 2 Episodes - "Wrath of the Villains: Mr. Freeze" and "Wrath of the Villains: A Dead Man Feels No Cold"
2016	Broad City	Co-Op Employee	Co-Star - 1 Episode: "Co-Op"
2016	High Maintenance	Crazy Person	Co-Star - 1 Episode: "Ex"
2014	The Mysteries of Laura	Pizza Delivery Guy	Co-Star - 1 Episode: "The Mystery of the Fertility Fatality"
2012	What Would You Do? (2008 TV program)	Chris (Self)	Special Appearance - 1 Episode
2009	Ugly Betty	Blonde Male Modie	Co-Star - 1 Episode: "Things Fall Apart"
2008	Law & Order: SVU	Emo	Co-Star - 1 Episode: "Wildlife"
