= Ryan Knowles =

American actor (born 1978)

- Knowles at 54 Below, New York City, July 2022.
- Born: Ryan Knowles; December 12, 1978 (age 47); Whittier, California, U.S.
- Occupations: Actor; singer; playwright; comedian
- Years active: 2005–present
- Website: ryanknowles.com

Ryan Knowles (born December 12, 1978) is an American actor, singer, comedian, writer, television host, speech coach, and motivational speaker.

== Career ==
On October 16, 2019, Knowles debuted on Broadway by starring in The Lightning Thief, which ran at the Longacre Theatre until early 2020. The New York Times listed him for his performance on its "Best Theater of 2019" list.

He played Nick Bottom in the 2005 musical adaptation of William Shakespeare's A Midsummer Night's Dream titled Fools in Love, with performances at the Manhattan Ensemble Theatre for over a year. He played Prospero in 2006, in another adaptation The Tempest, at the Cherry Lane Theatre in New York City. Knowles co-wrote the book with Daniel Neiden, taking inspiration from Tony Award-winning writer Thomas Meehan. In 2009, he featured in another Shakespeare adaptation titled Hound, playing Sherlock Holmes. He received the "Outstanding Supporting Actor in a Play" award from Planet Connections Theatre Festivity for his performance in the adaptation.

Off-Broadway, Knowles appeared in the award-winning topical revue Newsical: The Musical at Theatre Row's Kirk Theatre, alongside stars Christine Pedi, Michael West, Christina Bianco, Tommy Walker, and guest stars Perez Hilton, Andrea McArdle, Cheri Oteri, and Carson Kressley. He has appeared in the Radio City Christmas Spectacular at Radio City Music Hall and in other projects with the Rockettes. He wrote and performed his solo show Dig and Be Dug: The Gospel of Lord Buckley for the Planet Connections Theatre Festival in summer 2010. His performance as jazz comedian Lord Buckley won him awards for "Best Solo Show" and "Best Performance in a Solo Show."

In spring 2010, Knowles starred as Roman emperor Caligula in Randy Weiner and Alfred Preisser's Caligula Maximus at La MaMa Experimental Theatre Club, in the Ellen Stewart Theatre. In 2025, he joined Disney Cruise Line as a Broadway guest artist on the Disney Fantasy, portraying the roles of Jafar in Aladdin: A Musical Spectacular and Dr. Greenaway in Disney's Believe. It was his second appearance in a Disney show, having portrayed the Genie in the original production at the Hyperion Theatre in Disney California Adventure, Anaheim, California, in 2006 and 2007.

Before playing on Broadway, Knowles played the same roles in the First National Tour of The Lightning Thief for nine months. In winter 2009, he toured the country in Todrick Hall's Oz the Musical as Brenda, the "Wicked Witch of the West Side," alongside Vonzell Solomon, Aundrea Fimbres, and Orlando Brown. He spent a year on the North American leg of the 2013–2014 World Tour of We Will Rock You, the musical by Queen and Ben Elton. He performed in the North American tours of the Broadway production of How the Grinch Stole Christmas! The Musical in 2010 and 2011, playing the roles of Grandpa Who and understudy for the Grinch.

== Other work ==
Knowles has written stand-up, sketch comedy, short stories, six plays, and two musicals. Some of these include Dig and Be Dug: The Gospel of Lord Buckley, Nick Bottom's Extravaganza!, and The Tempest. In 2006, Knowles was the host of Nickelodeon's daily live show ME:TV. In 2008, Knowles appeared in his first feature film, Camp Hell, alongside Academy Award nominee Bruce Davison, Emmy winner Dana Delany, and Jesse Eisenberg. The film had a 2011 theatrical release.

In addition to performing, Knowles is a speech coach and political consultant. He has worked as a speechwriter and debate and vocal coach for numerous local and state candidates nationwide. Knowles is also a consultant in speech and interpretive performance for competitive high school students. He works with high school programs, both public and private, on both coasts. Knowles is the co-founder (with David Kraft) of Interprod Performance Studies Institute in Boston, Massachusetts, a summer intensive program for gifted young performers. This line of work was inspired by Knowles' success as a high school and collegiate speech and debate competitor, during which time he won numerous state and national championships, as well as becoming the first American to win a World Championship at the 2000 World Universities Debate Association Championship Tournament at the University of Glasgow in Scotland.

== Critical acclaim ==
Writing for the New York Times, Elizabeth Vincentelli praised Knowles' vocal range and comicality in The Lightning Thief, noting, "He can go down to chthonic depths when playing a centaur, for instance, yet for Hades, he models his grandiosely arch line readings after Paul Lynde's." The Boston Globe's Dan Aucoin referred to Knowles as his favorite among the cast members for the show, calling him "utterly hilarious." He was described as "a chameleonic standout" by Théoden Janes of the Charlotte Observer. The New Yorker referred to Knowles as "a scene-stealer of the highest order."

In his review of Caligula Maximus for Backstage, Clifford Johnson III stated that Knowles "carries the entire production on his slim shoulders". Mark Roberson, writing on Nytheatre.com, opined that "Knowles moves between his songs and speeches with ease, hitting all the right moments." Knowles was noted as "brave" and "highly attention-catching" by Jason Clark of Slant Magazine, and possessing "a dynamic presence" and an "appropriately seedy charisma" by Dan Bacalzo of TheaterMania.

Variety's Mark Blankenship praised Knowles' performance as Bottom in Fools in Love, remarking, "His fluidity and precision make him captivating to watch." Barbara and Scott Siegel of TheaterMania observed that "he can seemingly do anything with his voice and his body," with Mark Wood of Backstage referring to Knowles as "perhaps the lankiest actor ever to play the role of Bottom."

Tim Smith of the Baltimore Sun wrote that Knowles "steals the show time and again," for his role as Buddy in We Will Rock You.
