= Courtney Jines =

American actress, producer and screenwriter

- Born: Courtney Elizabeth Jines; May 4, 1992 (age 34); Fairfax, Virginia, U.S.
- Occupations: Actress, Producer, Screenwriter
- Years active: 2000–present

Courtney Elizabeth Jines (born May 4, 1992) is an American actress, producer, and screenwriter. She is best known for her roles as Demetra in Spy Kids 3-D: Game Over and Amanda Wilkinson in Because of Winn-Dixie. In 2012, Courtney founded her own production company called Moonflower Pictures.

== Life and career ==
Was born in Fairfax, Virginia. She began acting professionally at the age of eight. Her first television appearance was in 2000 in the episode "Demolition Derby" of the television series Third Watch as Lisa Hagonon. Her first role in film was as Harriet Deal in Drop Back Ten in 2000. She played Hannah Miller in the Law & Order: Special Victims Unit episode "Pixies" and Delilah in Gaudi Afternoon in 2001, and Jessica Trent in a CSI: Crime Scene Investigation episode called "Cats in the Cradle" in 2002. Also in 2002, she played Julie Morgan in Anna's Dream. In 2003 she played Kristen Farrell in the television series That Was Then, and Rachel in the ER episode "A Saint in the City." She was in Red Betsy as Jane Rounds, and played Demetra (A.K.A. The Deceiver) in Spy Kids 3-D: Game Over, which is the role that Jines is most famous for. In 2004, she guest starred on Jack & Bobby as Deena Greenberg in the episode "Today I Am a Man." In 2005, she starred as Bridget Byrne in Silver Bells. Jines also had the recurring role of Heidi on The War at Home.

In 2015, Courtney won a fellowship with Sundance Institute's Ignite Program, making her one of two female directors selected.

== Filmography ==
=== Television ===
Year	Series	Role	Episodes
2000	Third Watch	Lisa Hagonon	1 episode
2001	Law & Order: Special Victims Unit	Hannah Miller	1 episode
2002	CSI: Crime Scene Investigation	Jessica Rachel Trent	1 episode
2002	That Was Then	Kristen Farrell	1 episode
2003	ER	Rachel	1 episode
2004	Jack & Bobby	Deena Greenberg	1 episode
2006	The War at Home	Heidi	4 episodes

=== Film ===
Year	Film	Role	Notes
2000	Drop Back Ten	Harriet Deal	
2001	Gaudi Afternoon	Delilah	aka Tardes de Gaudí in Spain
2002	Anna's Dream	Julie Morgan	Television film
2003	Red Betsy	Jane Rounds	
2003	Spy Kids 3-D: Game Over	Demetra	
2005	Because of Winn-Dixie	Amanda Wilkinson	
2005	Silver Bells	Bridget Bryne	Television film
2014	Go to Sleep, Sadie	Sadie	Short film Also writer and producer
2017	The Apocalypse Will Blossom	Unnamed role	Short film Also writer, director, editor, and sound designer
