= List of Hope & Faith episodes =

List of 'Hope & Faith episodes

Hope & Faith is an American sitcom that originally aired on ABC. It originally premiered on September 26, 2003 and ended on May 2, 2006, with a total of 73 episodes over the course of 3 seasons.

== Series overview ==
Season	Episodes	Originally released	
Season	Episodes	First released	Last released
1	25	September 26, 2003	May 14, 2004
2	26	September 24, 2004	May 6, 2005
3	22	September 30, 2005	May 2, 2006

== Episodes ==
=== Season 1 (2003–04) ===
No. overall	No. in season	Title	Directed by	Written by	Original release date	Prod. code	Viewers (millions)
1	1	"Pilot"	Gil Junger	Joanna Johnson	September 26, 2003	101	11.79
2	2	"Remembrance of Rings Past"	Gil Junger	Jennie Snyder & Victoria Webster	October 3, 2003	102	9.90
3	3	"The Un-Graduate"	Gil Junger	Andrew Kreisberg	October 10, 2003	103	9.50
4	4	"Summary Judgement"	Gil Junger	Joanna Johnson	October 17, 2003	104	9.72
5	5	"About a Book Club"	Gil Junger	Jessica Kaminsky	October 24, 2003	105	8.87
6	6	"Hope Has No Faith (The Halloween Story)"	Gil Junger	David S. Rosenthal	October 31, 2003	106	7.68
7	7	"Car Commercial"	Gil Junger	Taylor Hamra	November 7, 2003	107	10.41
8	8	"Hope and Faith Get Randy"	Gil Junger	David S. Rosenthal	November 14, 2003	108	8.66
9	9	"Phone Home for the Holidays"	Gil Junger	Kat Likkel & John Hoberg	November 21, 2003	109	9.48
10	10	"Anger Management"	Gil Junger	Mark Driscoll	December 5, 2003	110	8.76
11	11	"Silent Night, Opening Night"	Gil Junger	Jennie Snyder & Victoria Webster	December 12, 2003	111	8.64
12	12	"The Wedding"	Gil Junger	Taylor Hamra	January 9, 2004	112	8.98
13	13	"Madam President"	Gil Junger	Mark Driscoll	January 23, 2004	113	8.61
14	14	"The Diner Show"	Gil Junger	Andrew Kreisberg	February 6, 2004	114	10.76
15	15	"Mismatch"	Don Scardino	Tom Devanney	February 13, 2004	116	7.95
16	16	"Charley's Baseball"	Gil Junger	Kat Likkel & John Hoberg	February 20, 2004	115	7.61
17	17	"Prom and Circumstance (Almost Paradise)"	Gil Junger	Alex Carter	February 27, 2004	117	8.06
18	18	"Jury Duty"	Gil Junger	Tod Himmel	March 5, 2004	118	8.18
19	19	"Faith's Maid"	Jerry Zaks	Story by : Taylor Hamra; Teleplay by : Kat Likkel & John Hoberg	March 19, 2004	119	6.87
20	20	"Hope Gets a Job"	Gil Junger	Joanna Johnson	April 9, 2004	120	6.82
21	21	"Faith's Husband"	Gil Junger	Tod Himmel	April 16, 2004	122	6.86
22	22	"Jack's Back"	Jerry Zaks	David S. Rosenthal	April 30, 2004	121	7.72
23	23	"Trade Show"	Don Scardino	Mark Driscoll	May 7, 2004	125	6.86
24	24	"Daytime Emmys: Parts 1 & 2"	Gil Junger	Story by : Joanna Johnson; Teleplay by : Jennie Snyder & Victoria Webster	May 14, 2004	123	8.27
25	25	"Daytime Emmys: Parts 1 & 2"	Gil Junger	Story by : Joanna Johnson; Teleplay by : Jennie Snyder & Victoria Webster	May 14, 2004	124	8.27

=== Season 2 (2004–05) ===
No. overall	No. in season	Title	Directed by	Written by	Original release date	Prod. code	Viewers (millions)
26	1	"Escape from Albuquerque"	Don Scardino	Peter Murrieta	September 24, 2004	201	7.13
The whole family are seeing Charlie off at the airport as he goes to get Faith, but just as he boards they see Faith walking into the terminal. When Charlie returns from the airport he says she can stay but if she makes one mistake she's gone. So when she keeps it a secret that Sydney (now played by Megan Fox) got her tongue pierced, and Charlie finds out, it is not long before Hope kicks her sister out.
27	2	"Mall in the Family"	Don Scardino	David S. Rosenthal	October 1, 2004	202	6.48
After getting kicked out of the house, Faith moves into a furniture display at a local mall. When she and Hope try to hide from the mall guards, they're locked in an armoire scheduled for an overseas delivery. Meanwhile, Hope and Sydney help Hayley purchase her first bra.
28	3	"Queer as Hope"	Don Scardino	Joanna Johnson	October 15, 2004	203	6.13
When Justin is caught smoking and Hayley steals frogs that are ready to be dissected, Hope starts to worry that everyone will think she's a bad mother. This fear comes to life when Faith tries to rent an apartment from a lesbian landlord by passing herself and Hope as lovers. When their picture ends up in the newspaper with the headline "local lesbians," Hope's bid for three time mother of the year is in jeopardy.
29	4	"Hold the Phone"	Don Scardino	Jenna Bruce	October 22, 2004	204	6.38
Charley's life becomes a living hell when Faith starts working as the receptionist in his orthodontics practice. When tensions mount, they make a bet for their most prized possessions and manage to ruin Hayley's science fair.
30	5	"Faith Scare-Field"	Don Scardino	Tom Leopold	October 29, 2004	205	7.03
Hope and Faith receive an invitation to a Halloween party from their crazy next door neighbor, whom they terrorized as young teen girls. Halloween turns out to be extra scary when the woman gets her revenge by trapping the women in a torture chamber. Meanwhile, Hayley and Sydney throw a party and Sydney falls for Edwin's teen brother but he has a girlfriend.
31	6	"Natal Attraction"	Gil Junger	Bob Gaylor	November 5, 2004	206	7.58
Hope and Faith play matchmakers for their father and their gynecologist, Anne (played by Jaclyn Smith). They hit it off, until Jack finds out that his ex-girlfriend, Mandi, is pregnant with his child. Meanwhile Charlie buys a piano for Hope.
32	7	"Stand by Your Mandi"	Gil Junger	Taylor Hamra	November 12, 2004	207	8.20
Even though his true love is Anne, Jack decides to marry Mandi. He is unaware, however, that Mandi is very much in love with her current boyfriend. But Mandi has a black boyfriend in which Mandi is pregnant with HIS love child.
33	8	"The Dolly Mama"	Gil Junger	Tod Himmel	November 19, 2004	209	6.95
To prove to Hope that she can be responsible, Faith practices motherhood on an electronic baby. It is all going well until she accidentally exchanges the doll for a real infant. Hayley first day of school is fantastic and she met a boy.
34	9	"Justin Time"	Don Scardino	Joanna Johnson	November 19, 2004	210	7.81
Faith, in her wacky efforts to impress an attractive single dad (Nick Lachey) tries to make him think that she's also a single parent by claiming her young nephew, Justin, is really her son. Meanwhile Hope is disappointed when Charley doesn't know her well.
35	10	"9012-Uh-Oh"	Gil Junger	Joanna Johnson	November 26, 2004	208	6.34
Thanksgiving day brings up memories of ten years ago, when Faith hosts a holiday dinner at her Hollywood apartment. She goes to great lengths to impress her parents, Jack and Mary Jo, including posing as Brian Austin Green's girlfriend. Happiness turns to sadness, however, when the family learns of Mary Jo's secret: she is dying.
36	11	"Do I Look Frat in This?"	Don Scardino	Jennie Snyder & Victoria Webster	December 3, 2004	211	6.74
Faith and Sydney get jobs at a clothing store. The young Shanowski decides to lose her virginity to the college-age manager, leading Hope and Faith to crash a frat party to keep Syd from making a big mistake. Justin bought himself a doll.
37	12	"Aru-Bah Humbug"	Don Scardino	Peter Murrieta	December 17, 2004	212	7.15
Faith accidentally says that "Santa" is not real, and Justin overhears it. So Faith wants Justin to believe in him by climbing in the chimney, but those plans go sour when Faith gets stuck in the chimney. Faith and the family decides to plan a trip to Aruba to get away from Hope's singing Christmas present shopping.
38	13	"The Gooch"	Gil Junger	Tod Himmel	January 7, 2005	213	8.82
Faith is attracted to her new neighbor, Gary "the Gooch" Gucharez a former baseball player. The notorious ladies' man, however, has no interest in her, leading Faith to go to great lengths to spy on him. The episode brings together Kelly Ripa and Mark Consuelos, who, not only played a married couple on All My Children, but are married in real life. Meanwhile Hayly and Edwin try go to a new level of their relationship and Sydney try to date Edwin's brother. At the end Faith and Sydney realize that Hope is right when she sees certain relationships don't work.
39	14	"Another Car Commercial"	Gil Junger	Taylor Hamra	January 14, 2005	214	8.74
Auto dealer Handsome Hal refuses to exchange Faith's lemon of a car unless she can get former baseball star, Gary "The Gooch" Gucharez, to do a commercial. Faith tricks the reluctant Gooch, but later regrets it because Hope reminds Faith that if you humiliate the Gooch on TV he will never speak to you anymore. Meanwhile Faith admits that Charley has a man crush when the Gooch calls Charley the Schnozgooch. Guest Stars: Regis Philbin and Michael Gelman.
40	15	"Carmen Get It"	Gil Junger	Jenna Bruce	January 21, 2005	215	7.86
Faith feuds with The Gooch's ex-girlfriend, Carmen, for his affection. And, after overhearing a life-altering message for The Gooch, Hope helps Faith scale a mountain to deliver the news to the man she loves. Meanwhile Charley wants a simple birthday party but Faith plans a surprise birthday for him in order to the get the Gooch away from Carmen. Carmen tells Faith if the Gooch goes to Japan we will both lose and Faith won't accept it. Guest Star: Carmen Electra.
41	16	"Catering-a-ding-ding"	Don Scardino	David S. Rosenthal	January 28, 2005	216	7.40
Faith wants an investor for her screenplay so she talks Hope into starting their own Catering business so Faith can get her investor and Charley, Justin, Hayley, and Sydney to work for free. When Barry Manilow's plane is delayed Faith has to entertain the guests with Justin. In the end, Faith decides to give up on her acting career.
42	17	"O' Sister, Where Art Thou?"	Lynn McCracken	Jennie Snyder	February 4, 2005	217	8.37
When Hope and Faith cater a party at a retirement home, Faith inadvertently helps a resident escape. While trying to sort out her own problems with her sister, Hope must help the escapee mend problems with her own sibling. Meanwhile Justin stole an item at the store. Guest Star: Rue McClanahan.
43	18	"Hope Couture"	Henry Chan	David S. Rosenthal	February 11, 2005	218	8.36
Faith and Sydney enter a mother-daughter fashion show. Feeling hurt, Hope enters it with Hayley and the game is on. However, dresses are slashed, the designers get covered with paint and a big fight ensues. Meanwhile Charley and Justin have a father-son camping trip in the wild until some big shots ruin it with their high-tech gear.
44	19	"Wife Swap: Part 1"	Dennis Dugan	Joanna Johnson & Jennie Snyder	February 18, 2005	219	8.24
Hope's life goes out of control when Faith submits Hope as a "Wife Swap" candidate. Hope gets switched with Cynthia (special guest-star Wynonna Judd.) Cynthia is a rich, spoiled, self-indulgent, Manhattanite. When Hope gets used to the fabulous life, Cynthia finds housework abhorrent -- but not nearly as abhorrent as living with Hope's sister, Faith. Meanwhile, Charley and Faith are having a difficult time coping with Cynthia, and Hayley has her first period.
45	20	"Wife Swap: Part 2"	Dennis Dugan	Joanna Johnson & Jennie Snyder	February 18, 2005	220	8.24
Hope finds it difficult living in an upscale Manhattan apartment with spoiled children, a work-alcoholic "husband" (Peter Jacobson). Also Faith finds it difficult that, Cynthia's live-in sister who does ALL the housework and won't let Hope lift a finger. Meanwhile Faith's world is turned upside-down when she's ordered to do mundane, household chores by Cynthia.
46	21	"21 Lunch Street"	Scott Ellis	Marc Dworkin & Sean W. Cunningham	March 4, 2005	221	6.76
Hope and Faith start working at Sydney's school as lunch ladies, which causes Sydney to freak out. Things go from bad to worse when Hope and Faith begin spying on Sydney, thinking that she's having an affair with her science teacher. Also Hope begins to change the household by eating healthy.
47	22	"A Room of One's Own"	Gil Junger	Alex Carter	March 25, 2005	222	6.10
Hope is discouraged when her mother-in-law, Joyce (Dixie Carter) takes over the household and also she starts to bond with Faith. And then things start to get worse when Joyce decides to leave her husband (Hal Holbrook). Making Joyce to move in permanently, displacing Faith in the process by redecorating the place.
48	23	"Faith Affair-field"	Lynn McCracken	Tom Leopold	April 8, 2005	223	6.12
Some lies lead Faith to believe that Charley is having an extra-marital affair but he's actually planning a romantic surprise for Hope. She enlists a reluctant Hope to help catch him in the act. Meanwhile, Hope and Charley have Wylon, a Chinese violinist exchange student, staying at the house. Wylon ends up going to the Glen Falls Suites by mistake.
49	24	"Weather or Not"	Gil Junger	Peter Murrieta	April 29, 2005	224	6.15
After improvising a weather report, Faith finds a new career as a weather woman at a local TV station and Hope encourages Faith to romantically pursue the hunky newscaster, Larry (Dean Cain). This causes Hope to feel abandoned at their new catering business and, in turn, Faith feels equally neglected when Hope replaces her with a new, highly motivated assistant. Faith's tenure as weather woman is distracted by a celebrity news report saying that the Gooch has been seen with a beautiful Japanese socialite. Later, when Faith realizes that the Gooch is seeing someone behind her back, she turns to Larry for comfort, then, in a moment's weakness, kisses him.
50	25	"Of Rice and Anchor Men"	Gil Junger	Tod Himmel	May 6, 2005	225	6.24
Just as Faith's relationship with newscaster Larry begins to move into high gear, her old flame, "The Gooch" (Mark Consuelos, Ripa's real-life husband), suddenly shows up to complicate matters.
51	26	"Season Finale"	Gil Junger	Joanna Johnson	May 6, 2005	226	6.24
When both men want an exclusive commitment from Faith, she resorts to everything from "Bachelorette" competition rules to a psychic's advise to help her choose between Larry, a handsome newscaster (Dean Cain), and charming former baseball star "The Gooch" (Mark Consuelos, Ripa's real-life husband).

=== Season 3 (2005–06) ===
No. overall	No. in season	Title	Directed by	Written by	Original release date	Prod. code	Viewers (millions)
52	1	"The Marriage"	Scott Ellis	Tod Himmel	September 30, 2005	301	7.53
53	2	"The Marriage"	Scott Ellis	Jennie Snyder	September 30, 2005	302	7.53
After years of searching for the right man, Faith receives two marriage proposals -- from The Gooch and from Larry Walker. Who will Faith choose? Whom will Faith say 'I do' to? Two marriage proposals- one from The Gooch and one from Larry Walker but which of the two will Faith choose? And what will Hope say of her sister's decision? So Faith and the Gooch decided to elope but it turns out she did marry him because of her sister and he proposed because Larry proposed. So Faith and the Gooch decide to annul their marriage.
54	3	"Faith Fairfield: 1970-2005"	Don Scardino	Sean W. Cunningham & Marc Dworkin	October 7, 2005	303	5.76
Sydney is late behind on her term paper so Faith gives out an advice in order to get an extension: claim there was a family death. So Sydney makes up the fact that Faith is dead. The media goes crazy over the news and Faith's celebrity status is restored. But Hope becomes the bigger star as the grieving sister. Meanwhile Hope wants to have a romantic date night with Charlie.
55	4	"The Phone Call"	Scott Ellis	Taylor Hamra	October 14, 2005	304	6.23
Faith confesses that she is tired of Hope complaining about her life, so Hope abstains from cleaning up Faith's mistakes like late bills and impounded car. But it is Charley who ends up suffering the most, when Hope decides to focus all of her energy on him.
56	5	"Love & Teeth"	Don Scardino	Bill Fuller & Jim Pond	October 21, 2005	305	6.23
When Faith cracks a tooth, she makes Charley treat her, despite the fact that they despise each other, or do they? The nitrous oxide he gives Faith makes her "a little baby," and what she says while she's under is very surprising indeed.
57	6	"The Halloween Party"	Don Scardino	David Babcock	October 28, 2005	306	6.55
There's a neighborhood Halloween party contest between Hope and her neighbor Trudy but what can Faith do when she is invited to Trudy's party as the date for Trudy's rather attractive cousin? So a Ed McBeckler told Charlie about his costume and so he decides to be a football fan instead and Hallie invites him. So Sydney dresses up a grape so Faith go to Trudy's party.
58	7	"Charley's Shirt"	Scott Ellis	Mark Driscoll	November 4, 2005	307	6.75
Faith is forced to pick up Hope's birthday gift for Charley after Hope is unable to make it. But Faith is too late and instead gets Charley an uncharacteristic shirt. Charley loves it and Hope fears she's too predictable these days. So Faith takes her to a pole dancing class. However there are unexpected results when Hope prepares to shake it for Charley when he runs into the pole and damaged his head.
59	8	"Faith's Therapy"	Scott Ellis	Christy Stratton	November 11, 2005	308	6.95
Charley and Hope force Faith to see a therapist (played by Susan Sullivan) after she doesn't take her job search seriously. However Faith uses therapy to her advantage and the plan has backfired on Hope and Charley. So, they decide to teach Faith a much needed lesson.
60	9	"Blood is Thicker Than Daughter"	Scott Ellis	Tod Himmel	November 18, 2005	309	7.07
Jack, the girls' father returns to town and there's something odd about him and a guy named Jay. Hope and Faith suspect that they're a gay couple but the real truth isn't what they had expected. The ladies found out that Jay is their half-brother because their dad was going through a hard time during marriage to Hope and Faith's mom; he met a lady with a same problem in her marriage and had a brief relationship. Surprised at the truth, Hope and Faith begins to open up to their new brother. It turns out that Jay is a cook.
61	10	"Hope in the Middle"	Don Scardino	Jennie Snyder	November 25, 2005	310	5.40
Dr. Lombard suggests Faith do something creative to get in touch with the performer within. So Faith signs up for Poetry and forces Hope to come along. But it is the same night as the night Charley is getting an award for being a good orthodontist. Hope chooses Faith and it creates a rift between the married couple. So Hope tag-a-long with Faith only get humiliated.
62	11	"Christmas Time"	Don Scardino	Geena Yaitanes	December 13, 2005	311	8.02
Faith surprises the entire family with personal, extravagant Christmas gifts, including an expensive gold watch for Charley. Mishap ensues when Charley gives the watch to a co-worker and it turns out the watch is fake gold.
63	12	"Sex, Lies & Faith"	Gil Junger	Taylor Hamra	January 6, 2006	313	8.32
Charley complains about his love life with Hope and they decide to spice things up. However, they begin to sneak around behind Faith's back and it is only a matter of time until Faith finds out.
64	13	"Now and Zen"	Scott Ellis	Christy Stratton	March 21, 2006	315	6.00
The Gooch returns but with a new Zen lifestyle that doesn't let him use his cell phone, car and no sex either for a life of celibacy and meditation. Faith decides to move on to her yoga instructor, making The Gooch jealous a big fight turns out. Eventually, he is forced to reveal the real reason why he's back from Japan – he got fired because it is a different baseball game in Japan.
65	14	"Homeless Hal"	Scott Ellis	Mark Driscoll	March 28, 2006	317	5.86
Handsome Hal is back! But he's now homeless and decides to team up with Faith. The new duo decide to try out for the Glenn Falls Morning Show... will their team-up be a winner?
66	15	"Meet the Parent"	Lynn McCracken	Bill Fuller & Jim Pond	April 4, 2006	316	4.19
Jack, Hope and Faith's father returns for Hope and Charley's 20th anniversary party and The Gooch is meeting him for the first time. After a bumpy start, The Gooch and Jack bond but Faith is surprised when her dad tells her that The Gooch isn't right for her so Faith decides to spruce up Gary's image. Meanwhile, Hope has her own issues because it seems like the party has shifted its focus to Faith.
67	16	"Charley Shoots Faith"	Gil Junger	Dave Boerger	April 11, 2006	318	4.90
Faith's agent suggests she gets some new head shots taken and Faith (as usual) misinterprets. Charley, after trying to ruin Faith's career offers to shoot the head shots and it turns out to be a success. Charley considers a change in career and Faith decides to give up on her career.
68	17	"The Big Shanowski"	Gil Junger	David Babcock	April 18, 2006	314	4.11
Faith demonstrates a talent for bowling but troubles arise when Charley replaces Hope for Faith in a tournament.
69	18	"The Restaurant"	Lynn McCracken	Genes Yaitanes	April 18, 2006	319	5.43
Johnny Galecki returns to Hope & Faith as the half brother Jay who recruits Hope as a sous-chef for his restaurant. Faith is jealous about their bond and talks to Dr Lombard, who advises her to focus on Jay. Jay and Faith bond and Jay confesses to Faith that Hope is driving him crazy like to rearranging the kitchen and re-chopping the food, and he wants to fire her. Faith and Charley try to spare Hope's feelings but they fail.
70	19	"Jay Date"	Don Scardino	Sean W. Cunningham & Mark Dworkin	April 25, 2006	322	4.00
Hope and Faith compete to match Jay with a certain woman. Although Faith wins when she matches Jay up with Amber, she discovers that Amber has a hidden agenda (stealing money out of the cash register) and enlists Charley and Hope's help.
71	20	"Old Faithful"	Don Scardino	Jim Pond & Bill Fuller	April 25, 2006	312	5.60
Faith (with help from Dr. Lombard) moves into a retirement home after realizing that she needs to change her living conditions but as always, her new home is not what she expected. Meanwhile, Charley rents Faith's old room to someone he thinks is a dream tenant but its turns out that the new tenant is high maintenance than Faith.
72	21	"Faith Knows Squat"	Michael Dorn	Andrew Guest	May 2, 2006	320	4.10
When Faith and The Gooch's antics begin to drive Hope and Charley crazy, Hope and Charley suggest they get a place of their own. However, when the truth comes out about real-estate technicalities, an outrageous battle of one ups-manship ensues.
73	22	"Hope's Float"	Peter Marc Jacobson	Nastaran Dibai & Jeffery B. Hodes	May 2, 2006	321	5.70
Hope reminisces with her family about the first fight she and Charley had during their courtship back in 1985 when they were both in college. Flashbacks reveal first meetings between Faith and Charley, a hilarious story about missing a Huey Lewis concert. When one of the kids saw their dad at the concert tension between Hope and Charlie but when Hope saw Faith with Charlie Hope is mad at her. When Faith and Charlie saw each other in the float room Faith starts smoking and Charlie stops her but the float catches on fire. However, as the story goes on, secrets come out including a surprise revelation about Hope.
