= Jordan-Claire Green =

American actress (born 1991)

- Born: October 31, 1991 (age 34); Terceira Island, Azores, Portugal
- Occupation: Actress
- Years active: 2001–present

Jordan-Claire Green (born October 31, 1991) is an American actress. She is best known for her role as Michelle in the film School of Rock. Ten years after the film's release, the cast reunited with Jack Black in Austin, Texas. They greeted fans on the red carpet, took part in a public re-screening of the film, followed by a Q&A, and then reunited on stage for a live music performance.

== Biography ==
Green was born on October 31, 1991, in Terceira Island, Azores, Portugal. She began violin lessons at age 4. She later took piano and voice lessons, as well as dance classes, including tap, ballet, jazz, and hip-hop. She appeared in School of Rock as Michelle, and at the age of 12 starred as Emma O'Conner in Kieth Merrill's The 12 Dogs of Christmas. She was 14 years old when she starred as Annie Lamm in Come Away Home, for which she received a Young Artist Award nomination for 'Best Performance – Leading Young Actress'. She also appeared in The Double, and Forgotten Pills, and she guest-starred in Power Rangers Time Force, Alias and Arrested Development.

== Filmography ==
- Power Rangers Time Force (1 episode, 2001) as Holly Zaskin
- City Guys (1 episode, 2001) as Elle
- School of Rock (2003) as Michelle
- Arrested Development (1 episode, 2004) as Supervisor's daughter
- Come Away Home (2005) as Annie Lamm
- The Double (2005) as Stephanie
- The 12 Dogs of Christmas (2005) as Emma O'Conner
- Alias (1 episode, 2005) as Nicole Gibson
- Boys Life (2006) as Debbie
- Girlfriends (1 episode, 2007) as Kelly
- Wizards of Waverly Place (1 episode, 2007) as Kelly
- Wild About Harry (2009) as Bridget Howard
- Forgotten Pills (2010) as Megan 15

== Awards ==
Year	Result	Award	Category	Work
2006	Nominated	Young Artist Awards	Best Performance in a Feature Film – Leading Young Actress	Come Away Home
