= Cody Estes =

American actor

Cody Estes (born March 13, 1994) is an American actor. His most recent role was as Charlie Cohen in Crossing Jordan, but his most frequent role has been younger versions of John "J.D." Dorian on the medical comedy Scrubs.

In 2006, Estes was given a Young Artist Award nomination for his starring role in the short film See Anthony Run, but lost to Evan Lee Dahl for his role in Christopher Brennan Saves the World.
