= Gregg Russell =

American musician

- Origin: Hilton Head Island, South Carolina, United States
- Genre: Children's music
- Occupations: Singer-songwriter, musician, producer, actor
- Instruments: Vocals, guitar
- Years active: 1956–present
- Website: (Official Website)

Gregg Russell is an American singer, songwriter and actor based in Hilton Head Island, South Carolina.

== Entertaining and music ==
In 1976, the founder of Sea Pines hired Russell to sing for two weeks. Russell has since performed concerts under an old oak tree at the Harbour Town marina on Hilton Head Island every summer.

== Filmography ==
Gregg Russell was featured in two award winning productions, Come Away Home and Camp Tanglefoot.

Russell is the subject of the documentary The Gregg Russell Story: If This Old Tree Could Talk.

== Personal life ==
Gregg Russell is originally from Alabama. He and his wife, Lindy Russell, have 3 children.

=== Philanthropy ===
Russell and his wife founded the Hilton Head Heroes Program, which provides vacations to Hilton Head Island for families with terminally ill children.
