= Silver Bells (film) =

2005 American television film

- Film poster
- Genre: Drama
- Based on: Silver Bells by Luanne Rice
- Written by: Jim McGrath
- Directed by: Dick Lowry
- Starring: Anne Heche; Tate Donovan
- Theme music composer: Mark McKenzie
- Country of origin: United States
- Original language: English

Production
- Producer: Andrew Gottlieb
- Cinematography: Eric Van Haren Noman
- Editor: Tod Feuerman
- Running time: 120 minutes
- Production company: Hallmark Hall of Fame

Original release
- Network: CBS
- Release: November 27, 2005

Silver Bells is a 2005 Hallmark Hall of Fame Christmas made-for-television drama film starring Anne Heche and Tate Donovan based on the 2004 novel of the same name by Luanne Rice. It originally aired on CBS on November 27, 2005.

== Plot summary ==
Every year, widower Chris Byrne (Tate Donovan) has traveled from Nova Scotia with his children to sell their homegrown Christmas trees in New York City. His teenage son Danny (Michael Mitchell) is not into his father's business, but instead has a true passion for photography. One year in New York City, Chris tells Danny that he's grounded when they get home until he gets his priorities straight, and Danny runs away, leaving Chris and his 10-year-old daughter Bridget (Courtney Jines) to return home without him. The next year, the two return to New York City to sell the trees while Chris goes out every night looking for Danny.

Catherine (Anne Heche) lives in the same New York neighborhood and hasn't celebrated Christmas since the year her husband died. Every year Chris has tried to sell her a tree, but Catherine politely refuses. Neither of them realize that their lives are connected by Danny. While Chris is back in Nova Scotia with Bridget, Catherine pays Danny for photographs that he takes and puts them in the newspaper. When Chriscomes back the following year, Catherine does not tell him that she knows where Danny is because Danny made her promise not to. Catherine does tell Chris afterwards when Danny injures himself by falling off the roof of the Belvedere Castle and into a frozen pond. In the hospital, Chris tells Danny that he is allowing him to stay in New York City to become a photographer.

== Cast ==
- Anne Heche as Catherine O'Mara
- Tate Donovan as Chris Byrne
- Courtney Jines as Bridget Byrne
- Michael Mitchell as Danny Byrne
- John Benjamin Hickey as Lawrence
- Lourdes Benedicto as Lizzie
- Victoria Justice as Rose

== See also ==
- List of Christmas films
