= Kat Likkel and John Hoberg =

American screenwriters and producers

- Occupation: Screenwriters and producers
- Education: Likkel: Emporia State University; Hoberg: Skidmore College
- Years active: Late 1990s–present
- Notable works: My Name Is Earl, Better Off Ted, Galavant, and Elemental

Kat Likkel and John Hoberg are an American duo of screenwriters and producers of television and film. A married couple who has been working together since the late 1990s, their writing and production credits include television series My Name Is Earl, Better Off Ted, Black-ish, Galavant, Downward Dog, and American Housewife, as well as the Pixar film Elemental.

== Early life and education ==
Kat Likkel grew up in Battle Creek, Michigan. During her sophomore year in high school, she moved to Colby, Kansas, where she graduated from Colby High School. Likkel went to Emporia State University where she initially studied acting, then later moved to Los Angeles to pursue a writing career.

John Hoberg grew up in Grandview Heights, Ohio. He attended Grandview Heights High School and graduated from Columbus Academy. He was later educated at Skidmore College in Upstate New York.

== Career ==
Likkel and Hoberg began their writing careers separately, working in children's television. Likkel began writing for animated shows in the late 1990s. Among her early credits were episodes of Rugrats and Aaahh!!! Real Monsters, where she also had the opportunity to direct the voice acting performance of Tim Curry who had a recurring role. She also wrote episodes for Disney's Timon & Pumbaa.

In 1999, Likkel was a co-creator of the animated show Sabrina: The Animated Series. Writing for Sabrina: The Animated Series was also among Hoberg's first work, but the couple initially resisted working together with Hoberg's career diverging toward live-action television with Nickelodeon sketch comedies All That and The Amanda Show.

In 2003, the couple began to consistently team up, beginning with Hope & Faith starring Kelly Ripa. The ABC sitcom was their breakthrough writing role and also provided them with experience with a production before a live audience. Their next notable role was on the NBC sitcom My Name Is Earl, on which by Season 4, Likkel and Hoberg were both serving as co-executive producers.

Likkel and Hoberg next worked on Better Off Ted (2009–2010), Better with You (2010–2011), The Neighbors (2013–2014), and Black-ish. During this period, they had signed a two-year overall contract with ABC Studios beginning 2010 and renewed multiple times.

In 2015, they began to write and executive produce Galavant, a fantasy musical series. To oversee production on the eight-episode first season, they moved to England for four months and were on set everyday running the production. They returned as showrunners for the second season of Galavant.

Likkel and Hoberg were showrunners on ABC's Downward Dog, which premiered with the first four episodes of the first season showing at the 2017 Sundance Film Festival—the first broadcast comedy to be launched at the festival. From 2017 to 2019, Likkel and Hoberg worked as consulting producers on American Housewife continuing their collaboration with ABC Studios. Their work on the show included writing teleplay for the musical Season 3 finale, "A Mom's Parade".

Likkel and Hoberg wrote the screenplay for Elemental with Brenda Hsueh. Having previously only worked in television, the Pixar film was the first feature film for Likkel and Hoberg. They were recruited to take over writing the film in 2019 and the film went through several rewrites before its premiere in 2023. Elemental was directed by Peter Sohn.

== Personal life ==
Likkel and Hoberg are married. They live in Pasadena, California.

== Filmography ==
=== Kat Likkel only ===
Year	Title	Refs.
1997–1998	Rugrats	
1997	Aaahh!!! Real Monsters	
1999	Timon & Pumbaa	

=== John Hoberg only ===
Year	Title	Refs.
1999–2001	The Amanda Show	
2002	All That	
2025	Paradise	

=== Together ===
Year	Title	Refs.
1999	Sabrina: The Animated Series	
2002	Girls Behaving Badly	
2003–2004	Hope & Faith	
2005	Pet Alien	
2005	Life on a Stick	
2005–2009	My Name Is Earl	
2009–2010	Better Off Ted	
2010–2011	Better with You	
2011–2012	Man Up!	
2013–2014	The Neighbors	
2015	Black-ish	
2015–2016	Galavant	
2016	Uncle Buck	
2017	Downward Dog	
2017–2019	American Housewife	
2023	Elemental	
