= Brett Murphy =

American journalist (born 1991)

- Born: October 4, 1991 (age 34); Worcester, Massachusetts, U.S.
- Education: University of Pittsburgh (BA); University of California, Berkeley (MJ)

Brett Murphy is an American journalist, best known as a Pulitzer Prize finalist in 2018 for his investigative reporting series on the exploitation of truckers in California. He was also a child actor in the early 2000s, appearing in films including Fever Pitch.

Murphy's article "Rigged", published by USA Today and detailing the financial exploitation of port truckers, won plaudits including the Hillman Prize, the National Headliner Award for Investigative Reporting, the Gerald Loeb Award, the Sidney Award and the Al McDowell Award. He was a finalist for both the Pulitzer Prize in National Reporting and the ASNE Awards for Justice in Journalism. Murphy had previously been a finalist for the IRE Awards in Investigation Innovation in 2016.

== Early life and career ==
Murphy was born on October 4, 1991, in Worcester, Massachusetts.

His early life included a child acting career including theater, commercials, films, and television shows. His acting career spanned from 2003 to 2006. After performing in local youth theatre, he appeared in commercials including for Disney World, Ocean Spray, General Mills, Campbell's, The New York Post, and Papa Gino's. From 2003 until 2005, Murphy had a recurring role as Edwin in five episodes of the ABC sitcom Hope and Faith. In 2005, he had a role in the feature film Fever Pitch as Ryan, and appeared in an episode of Saturday Night Live. His last professional acting credit was an appearance in the pilot episode of Damages.

Murphy attended St. John's High School in Shrewsbury, Massachusetts.

== Education ==
Murphy studied non-fiction writing at the University of Pittsburgh and graduated with a Bachelor of Arts on Dec. 14, 2013, summa cum laude. He subsequently attended the University of California, Berkeley's Graduate School of Journalism, graduating with a Master of Journalism in May 2016.

== Journalism career ==
Before joining USA Today as an investigative reporter, Murphy worked for the Naples Daily News, CBS Interactive, and the magazine Pitt Med. He has also contributed to the Guardian, Univision, San Jose Mercury News, CNET, NPR, and PBS affiliate KQED.

He currently works for the USA Today network in Florida as an investigative reporter. His series "Rigged: Forced in Debt. Worked Past Exhaustion," which reports on labor exploitation in the California trucking industry, won him critical acclaim in 2018. Following its publication, California passed legislation, Senate Bill No. 1402, to hold labor violations more accountable. Murphy co-founded the weekly newsletter Local Matters with fellow journalists Joseph Cranney and Alexandra Glorioso in 2016, curating local investigative news from over 100 different newspapers.

In 2022, Murphy and his co-authors won a Robert F. Kennedy Journalism Award in Criminal Justice for their December 2021 article, "Behind the Blue Wall of Silence," published in USA Today. This investigative report examined the culture of retaliation against police whistleblowers.

Murphy's December 2022 report in ProPublica, "Words of Conviction," earned a George Polk Award for Justice Reporting and the 2023 Brechner Freedom of Information Award. The investigative report debunked "911 call analysis," a technique developed by retired police chief Tracy Harpster, purporting to indicate the guilt of callers reporting the death of someone based on their voice patterns during the call.

In 2024, Murphy was among the ProPublica authors awarded the Pulitzer Prize for Public Service for their reporting on the billionaires giving gifts to the US Supreme Court's justices and covering their travel expenses.
