= Hope & Faith =

American sitcom

- Genre: Sitcom
- Created by: Joanna Johnson
- Based on: Life of Joanna Johnson
- Starring: Faith Ford; Kelly Ripa; Ted McGinley; Nicole Paggi; Megan Fox; Macey Cruthird; Paulie Litt
- Theme music composer: Jon Gilutin & David Rice; John Swihart & Alissa Moreno; Scott Schreer
- Composer: Scott Schreer
- Country of origin: United States
- Original language: English
- No. of seasons: 3
- No. of episodes: 73 (list of episodes)

Production
- Executive producers: Joanna Johnson; Emile Levisetti; Gil Junger; Guymon Casady; Geyer Kosinski; Nastaran Dibai; Jeffrey B. Hodes; Rob Hanning; Michael Edelstein; Keith Addis
- Producers: Alysse Bezahler; Tod Himmel; Jason Fisher; Christy Stratton; David Regal; Faith Ford; Kelly Ripa
- Camera setup: Multi-camera
- Running time: 22 minutes (approx.)
- Production companies: Industry Entertainment; Touchstone Television

Original release
- Network: ABC
- Release: September 26, 2003 – May 2, 2006

Hope & Faith is an American television sitcom, starring Faith Ford and Kelly Ripa as Hope Shanowski and Faith Fairfield, respectively. Hope is a homemaker and mother of three and Faith is her sister, a washed up soap opera star whose character is killed off, leading her to move in with Hope and her family in the fictional suburban Cleveland town of Glen Falls, Ohio. It originally aired on ABC from September 26, 2003, to May 2, 2006. During its first and second seasons, the series was part of the revived TGIF comedy block.

Hope & Faith was created and produced by Joanna Johnson, who loosely based the premise on her own life as a former cast member of The Bold and the Beautiful. The series was primarily filmed at New York City's Silvercup East, a sister studio to Silvercup Studios. In May 2006, ABC announced that Hope & Faith had been cancelled after three seasons.

== History ==
ABC announced on January 18, 2006, that it was benching Hope & Faith for the February sweeps to make room for an expanded edition of Dancing with the Stars. The show began to air its remaining episodes from March 21, 2006, on Tuesdays at 8:30 p.m. ET against American Idol. In May 2006, ABC announced that the show would be cancelled when it unveiled its fall 2006 line up.

== Main characters ==
- Hope Shanowski née Fairfield (Faith Ford). Hope is usually the most sensible one, and is always reluctant to go along with her sister's schemes. She is married to Charlie and has three kids, Sydney, Hayley, and Justin. She likes to bake and garden, and eventually has her own catering business.
- Faith Fairfield (Kelly Ripa). Faith is Hope's younger dim-witted celebrity sister. She was on Star Search, and starred as Ashley Storm (a character who had an evil twin named Angela) on the fictional soap opera The Sacred and the Sinful. Faith is lazy and makes Hope wait on her. She always hatches schemes and manages to involve her sister in them. She makes repeated attempts to get more acting work but is never successful. In season two, one of Faith's schemes involved her and Hope's creating a catering business: as a result, Faith ended up becoming a professional caterer. She also claimed to have invented the idea of the internet, stating she "has the sketches."
- Charlie Shanowski (Ted McGinley; Josh Stamberg, unaired pilot). Charlie is Hope's husband and patriarch of the family. He dislikes Faith, and is always trying to get her to leave. He is an orthodontist. He likes watching sports and is a fan of Faith's former baseball playing boyfriend The Gooch.
- Sydney Shanowski (Nicole Paggi, season 1; Megan Fox, season 2–3; Brie Larson, unaired pilot). Sydney is Hope and Charlie's elder daughter. She particularly likes spending time with her aunt Faith, whom she sees as way cooler than her mother and gets sucked into Faith's schemes. She is portrayed as popular, vain, boy crazy, mean and kind of ditzy.
- Hayley Shanowski (Macey Cruthird). Hayley is Hope and Charlie's younger daughter. She is portrayed as the smart child who gets promoted to high school in season two. She is also caring and an animal activist. Sometimes she belittles her older sister because Hayley is smarter than her. She eventually becomes Edwin's girlfriend.
- Justin Shanowski (Paulie Litt; Jansen Panettiere, pilot episode only; Slade Pearce, unaired pilot). Justin is Hope and Charlie's only son. He is smart and is known to act like an adult with his mature interests (such as Frank Sinatra). He usually pals around with his dad and likes his aunt.

=== Recurring characters ===
- Jack Fairfield (Robert Wagner, Harve Presnell, unaired pilot). Jack is Hope and Faith's father and ever since his wife (Hope and Faith's mother) Mary Jo died, he has dated women half his age. The reason he married Hope and Faith's mother is because she was pregnant with Hope. He also had an affair with another woman when his marriage with Mary Jo was on the rocks and had an illegitimate son named Jay.
- Gary "The Gooch" Gucharez (Mark Consuelos). The Gooch is a baseball player, who was a former hot-shot major league baseball player who ruined his career by failing to catch a slow moving ball. Upon meeting, he and Faith bump heads, but the pair eventually have the hots for each other and start dating. Later on, the Gooch gets a job offer to play baseball in Japan and leaves their love behind. However, he moves back to the States in hopes of declaring his love for Faith and they eventually elope in the season three premiere. Although their marriage is short-lived, he comes back in a later episode and he and Faith re-unite.
- Edwin (Brett Murphy). Edwin plays Haley's boyfriend. He is portrayed as a smart nerd who has many allergies and asthma. He appeared in five episodes; "Hope Has No Faith", "Silent Night, Opening Night", "Mismatch", "Faith Scare-Field", and "The Gooch".
- Henry (Stark Sands). Edwin's older brother and someone who Sydney has a crush on. Like his brother, Henry is also smart.
- Mandi Ragner (Jenny McCarthy). Mandi has been Faith's best friend since they were in school. Mandi dates Hope and Faith's father Jack for one episode. She comes back in a later episode and tells their father that she is pregnant with his child. He planned to marry her, but when the baby was born it was obvious it wasn't his. She appeared in three episodes; "Jack's Back", "Natal Attraction", and "Stand By Your Mandi".
- Handsome Hal Halverson (Regis Philbin). Handsome Hal is a successful used car salesman. He uses celebrities and makes fools of them in his commercials. In his first episode, he makes a fool out of Faith in his commercials. In his second episode, he makes a fool out of the Gooch in his commercials. And in his final episode, he loses his car dealership and becomes broke. Faith decides to be nice and invites him to stay with them. He has a scheme for the two of them to host a morning talk show. The producers love him, but they tell him to dump Faith. He appeared in one episode each season; "Car Commercial", "Another Car Commercial", and "Homeless Hal".
- Nancy Lombard (Susan Sullivan). Nancy is Faith's therapist. She helps Faith after Charlie and Hope force her to see Dr. Lombard. In one episode, she tells Faith to do something fun, which she drags Hope into. She can also be very sensible towards Faith and usually tells her the right thing to do, but can cause some backfire for both Hope and Faith. She appeared in four episodes in Season 3 "Faith's Therapy", "Hope in the Middle", "The Restaurant", and "Old Faithful".
- Brooke Spencer (Rebecca Budig). Brooke is Faith's replacement on The Sacred and the Sinful. Many think that Brooke is a better fit as Ashley Storm, but some still think Faith is better. She has a disliking to Faith and always tries to outstage her. At the Daytime Emmys, it is revealed that Brooke Spencer is a man and Jacqueline Karr is her mother, another famous soap star. She appears in four episodes in Season 1, which are, "Silent Night, Opening Night", "Trade Show", "Daytime Emmy's: Part 1", and Daytime Emmy's: Part 2".
- Jay (Johnny Galecki). Jack Fairfield had an affair with a lady, resulting in Jay. Therefore, Jay is Hope's and Faith's younger half brother. Galecki appears in 3 episodes. The name of the episodes are "Blood Is Thicker Than Daughter", "The Restaurant" and the episode "Jay Date".

=== Notable guest stars ===
- Clint Black
- Nick Lachey
- Tony Curtis
- Dean Cain
- Robert Wagner
- Cheryl Ladd
- Regis Philbin
- Kathie Lee Gifford
- Jenny McCarthy
- Carmen Electra
- Jaclyn Smith
- Ben Bailey
- Mark Consuelos
- Rue McClanahan
- Carol Kane
- Lynda Carter
- Susan Lucci
- Susan Flannery
- Dominic Chianese
- Tom Arnold
- Peter Vack
- Kevin Sorbo
- Roger Clemens
- Willie Randolph
- Brian Austin Green
- Dixie Carter
- Hal Holbrook
- Andrea Martin
- Paul Shaffer
- Wynonna Judd

== Episodes ==
Season	Episodes	Originally aired	
Season	Episodes	First aired	Last aired
1	25	September 26, 2003	May 14, 2004
2	26	September 24, 2004	May 6, 2005
3	22	September 30, 2005	May 2, 2006

== Reception ==
=== Critical reception ===
Hope & Faith received generally mixed reviews. On review aggregation website Rotten Tomatoes, the first season reports a 25% approval rating, based on 8 reviews. In a review for Variety, following the pilot episode, Phil Gallo criticised that it was predictable, commenting that the show is "Banal and derivative, ABC’s attempt to revive the TGIF franchise hinges on the concept that every generation needs its own Family Matters or Full House; this attempt to create a recipe based on the appeal of those shows backfires so badly." He continued, "Ripa and Ford are adequate, but the direction, writing and husband role are so lifeless, it would take some truly bizarre occurrences to make this at least unpredictable."

People Magazine gave the series a scathing review, and was highly critical of the pilot episode's humor, referring to it as a "terribly frantic half hour", and of Ripa, said that "this comedy would have more potential if Ripa’s over-the-top character were chewing up a soap-opera set rather than running amok in a Middle American kitchen.

In a favorable review from Ken Tucker for Entertainment Weekly, he praised the show's premise, and the performances of both Ford and Ripa, stating that the series is "Loud, obvious, and crass, Hope & Faith is one of this season’s more fascinating new sitcoms."

=== Ratings ===
US Ratings
Season		Episodes	Premiere	Season finale	Viewers (in millions)	Rank
1	2003–2004	25	September 26, 2003	May 14, 2004	8.2	#77
2	2004–2005	26	September 24, 2004	May 6, 2005	6.9	#98
3	2005–2006	22	September 30, 2005	May 2, 2006	5.8	#103

=== Awards and nominations ===
Year	Association	Category	Nominee	Result	Ref
2004	Angel Awards	Best New Comedy	Hope & Faith	Won	
2004	Young Artist Awards	Best Performance in a TV Series (Comedy or Drama) - Young Actress Age Ten or Younger	Macey Cruthird	Nominated	
2004	People's Choice Awards	Favorite New Television Comedy Series	Hope & Faith	Nominated	
2004	Television Week's Critics Poll	Worst Television (#8)	Hope & Faith	Won	
2005	Primetime Emmy Awards	Primetime Emmy Award for Outstanding Cinematography for a Multi-Camera Series	Richard Quinlan (episode: "Carmen Get It")	Nominated	
2005	Young Artist Awards	Best Performance in a TV Series (Comedy or Drama) - Supporting Young Actress	Megan Fox	Nominated	
2006	Angel Awards	Best Comedy Series	Hope & Faith	Won	
2006	Young Artist Awards	Best Family Television Series (Comedy)	Hope & Faith	Nominated	
2006	Young Artist Awards	Best Performance in a TV series - Supporting Young Actress (Comedy)	Macey Cruthird	Nominated	
2006	Young Artist Awards	Best Performance in a TV series - Supporting Young Actor (Comedy)	Paulie Litt	Nominated	

== Home media ==
On March 31, 2009, Lionsgate Home Entertainment (under license from ABC Studios) released Season 1 of Hope & Faith on DVD in Region 1. The set contains four discs and specials features include a blooper reel, audio commentaries, and cast and crew interviews. The second and third seasons have not yet been released.

== Reruns and syndication ==
Shortly after the series was canceled, WE tv acquired the cable syndication rights to Hope & Faith and it debuted in August 2006, lasting through May 2010, in which it aired all 73 episodes. The series has also been screened on CMT and ABC Spark in Canada. In the United Kingdom the show was broadcast on the now defunct ABC1 from 2005, until the channel's closure in 2007, and in Ireland on RTÉ One and RTÉ Two, where it was aired in its entirety. In Australia, it was originally screened on Seven Network, and rerun on rival Network Ten's afternoon schedule. The show is also shown in Latin America, Fiji, New Zealand, Norway and Denmark.

Broadcast in other countries

- Macau: Hope and Faith on (STAR World)
- India: Hope and Faith on (Comedy Central India)
- Italy: Hope e Faith on (FOX Life), (Canale 5) and (Italia 1)
- Latvia: Ticēt un Cerēt on (LNT)
- New Zealand: Hope and Faith on (TV2)
- Pakistan: Hope and Faith on (International Oscar)
- Portugal: Hope and Faith on (FOX Life)
- Turkey: Hope and Faith on (TNT)
- Russia: Королева экрана on (Disney Channel (Russia))
- North Macedonia: Hope and Faith on (FOX Life)
- Bulgaria: Сестри по неволя on (FOX Life)
- France: La star de la famille on (M6)
- Kosovo: Hope and Faith on (FOX Life)

== International versions ==
A Turkish adaptation of the series, titled Belalı Baldız (Troublesome Sister-in-law), aired in 2005 on ATV. Lead actors and actresses were Berna Laçin (Dilek; Hope), Nurgül Yeşilçay (Arzu; Faith) and Kenan Işık (Faruk; Charlie). Reruns began in July 2008 on TürkMax. All 34 episodes were made available on YouTube by the producer in 2018.
