= Macey Cruthird =

American actress

- Born: Macey Ellen Cruthird; November 12, 1992 (age 33); Baytown, Texas, U.S.
- Occupation: Actress
- Years active: 2002–present

Macey Ellen Cruthird (born November 12, 1992) is an American actress best known for her role as Hayley Shanowski in the ABC sitcom Hope & Faith.

== Career ==
Macey has trained in numerous acting and auditioning workshops in Los Angeles and her hometown of Frisco, Texas. She was cast in two pilots for Warner Brothers, "House Blend" and "The Misadventures of Fiona Plum," before landing her spot on Hope & Faith which she played for its entire three season run. She's also done numerous commercials, including Toyota, McDonald's, TJ Maxx and others, as well as print work.

Macey made her feature film debut in the independent family film, "Come Away Home," which premiered during the summer of 2005 and starred Paul Dooley, Martin Mull, Thomas Gibson and Lea Thompson. Additionally, she had the opportunity to work with one of her best friends, actress Jordan-Claire Green, in the movie.

Macey had a recurring role on the sitcom Two and a Half Men, as Megan, Jake's girlfriend.

She was cast in the sitcom, Deeply Irresponsible as Alison Atlin in 2007, however, the show failed to air and remained an unaired pilot. She was cast as Maddie in the Kelsey Grammer-led sitcom Hank and filmed the original pilot, however, she was replaced by Jordan Hinson for the role after they decided to age the character.

== Personal life ==
Cruthird has an older sister named Bailey, who is a singer and also guest starred in one episode of Hope & Faith. Cruthird went to St. Joseph's School in Yorkville, New York. Macey's other skills and hobbies include singing, dancing, piano, playing guitar, snow skiing and outdoor sports of all kinds, especially water sports. She is an avid animal lover and has a Maltese puppy, Gidget.

In 2004, Cruthird was nominated for the Young Artist Award Best Performance in a TV Series (Comedy or Drama) - Young Actress Age Ten or Younger for Hope & Faith.

In 2006, Cruthird was nominated for the Young Artist Award Best Performance in a TV Series (Comedy) - Supporting Young Actress for Hope & Faith.

== Filmography ==
=== Television ===
Year	Title	Role	Notes
2001	The (Mis)Adventures of Fiona Plum	Unknown	Unaired television pilot
2002	House Blend	Courtney Harper	Unsold television pilot
2003 - 2006	Hope & Faith	Hayley Shanowski	Main role; 56 episodes Nominated - Young Artist Award Best Performance in a TV Series (Comedy or Drama) (2004); Nominated - Young Artist Award Best Performance in a TV Series (Comedy or Drama) (2006)
2007	Deeply Irresponsible	Alyson Atlin	Unaired Pilot
2009	Hank	Maddie Pryor	Unaired Pilot
2010	Hawthorne	Cassie Maxwell	Episode: "Hidden Truths"
2010 - 2011	Two and a Half Men	Megan	4 episodes
2012	The Secret Life of the American Teenager	Fern	Episode: "Love is Love"
2013	NCIS: Los Angeles	Talia Radler	Episode: "Drive"

=== Film ===
Year	Title	Role	Notes
2005	Come Away Home	Holly	TV movie
2014	The Occupants	Ruth	
2018	Minutes to Midnight	Heather	

== Award Nominations ==
Year	Result	Award	Category	Work
2004	Nominated	Young Artist Awards	Best Performance in a TV Series (Comedy or Drama) - Young Actress Age Ten or Younger	Hope & Faith
2006	Nominated	Young Artist Awards	Best Performance in a TV series - Supporting Young Actress (Comedy)	Hope & Faith
