= List of Lalaloopsy episodes =

Lalaloopsy is a children's television series based on the Lalaloopsy dolls from MGA Entertainment. The series was ordered on February 11, 2013 for a spring 2013 premiere. It premiered on Nickelodeon on March 29, 2013 and ended on September 14, 2015, with a total of 52 episodes over the course of 2 seasons.

== Series overview ==
Season	Episodes	Originally released	
Season	Episodes	First released	Last released
1	26	March 29, 2013	January 25, 2014
2	26	June 7, 2014	September 14, 2015

== Episodes ==
=== Season 1 (2013–14) ===
No. overall	No. in season	Title	Directed by	Written by	Original release date	Prod. code	U.S. viewers (millions)
1	1	"Batter Up!"	Melissa Suber	Dean Stefan	March 29, 2013	104	1.65
The Lalaloopsies try to break the record of tallest stack of pancakes ever and, at the same time, Forest and his pet beaver tap trees for syrup.
2	2	"Princess Parade"	Melissa Suber	Corey Powell	April 1, 2013	102	1.12
Jewel and Tippy host a princess party and teach their friends how to be princesses. Then, Jewel and Tippy go to Crumbs' house to make giant dessert-themed parade floats so that they can show off their tiaras and new princess skills.
3	3	"Spot-itis"	Melissa Suber	David Grubstick	April 2, 2013	103	1.35
Rosy has to find a cure for a mysterious ailment that spreads through Lalaloopsy Land that covers everyone in colorful spots. Also, Peanut teaches a pet elephant how to walk on stilts.
4	4	"Dot's Moon Mission"	Melissa Suber	Carin Greenberg	April 3, 2013	101	1.33
Dot wants to go to the Moon but the plans are in shambles when the rocketship breaks down and, seeing how upset she is, the other Lalaloopsies fail multiple times to build the Moon in Lalaloopsy Land.
5	5	"The Big Sheep Sleep"	Melissa Suber	Carin Greenberg	April 8, 2013	106	1.31
Pillow has trouble napping so she borrows Little Bah Peep's sheep to count. But with so many sheep in the house, things get chaotic. Pillow and the other Lalaloopsies must collect the sheep that are running away before Little Bah Peep finds out.
6	6	"March of the April Fools"	Melissa Suber	Jeff Goode	April 9, 2013	107	1.27
On April Fool's Day, Peanut tries to prank the Lalaloopsies in 24 hours. Meanwhile, Jewel (who dislikes Peanut's pranks because she always gets messy) hires Spot to spy on Peanut so that she can be prepared for any mess that comes this way; and Misty works on the magic trick.
7	7	"Saved by the Gift"	Melissa Suber	Joseph Purdy	April 10, 2013	105	1.19
Spot gives Jewel an art piece but Jewel herself isn't very fond of it, so she attempts to give it away to the Lalaloopsies. However, the art piece comes in handy when Marina gets lost at sea in Lalaloopsy Land.
8	8	"In a Jam"	Melissa Suber	Gabe Pulliam	May 3, 2013	113	1.02
When a cold front tries to freeze Berry's berry crop, Mittens becomes snowed in so Ace rescues Mittens with the help of Sunny.
9	9	"Flight Plan"	Melissa Suber	Kris Marvin Hughes	May 20, 2013	110	1.31
Pix E is chosen the "shooting star" of Jewel's sparkle and shine party but is afraid of heights (and she takes lessons). Meanwhile, Mouse wants to help Crumbs bake cupcakes for the party but isn't very skilled.
10	10	"Tower of Treasure"	Melissa Suber	Joseph Purdy	May 21, 2013	109	1.24
Marina surprises Patch by cleaning his house but she accidentally tosses his lucky shovel away, so they go on a treasure hunt to find it while Dot and Bea fly kites at the same time.
11	11	"Pickles Delivers"	Melissa Suber	David Grubstick	May 22, 2013	108	1.27
Pickles is trying to make the biggest delivery ever but can't (because of twisting the ankle), so three of the pets help her deliver the 50 pickle burgers to the "air show" contest.
12	12	"A Tree Grows in Lalaloopsy Land"	Melissa Suber	Dean Stefan	May 23, 2013	111	1.37
After Blossom grows a "marshmallow tree" for Sprinkles, the other Lalaloopsies want to grow their own trees but she knows "not anything grows", so Peanut teaches Squirt to perform the "extravaganza".
13	13	"Ace in the Hole"	Melissa Suber	Joseph Purdy	July 15, 2013	TBA	N/A
Tippy hires Ace to improve upon her broken gramophone for her big ballet recital so Ace borrows parts from his other friends' things to fix it. However, all of the devices end up doing weird things and, during the hottest day of the year, Ember and the pet dalmatian spread water through Lalaloopsy Land to cool everyone and everything down.
14	14	"A Hobby for Bea"	Melissa Suber	Kris Marvin Hughes	July 16, 2013	TBA	N/A
Bea finds out that she doesn't have a hobby. With the help of Spot, she tries everyone else's hobbies to find out the one thing she's really good at. In the meantime, the cocoa mug on top of Mittens' house has toppled over and cocoa is leaking through the roof.
15	15	"Dyna-mic Duo"	Melissa Suber	Kevin Monk	July 17, 2013	116	N/A
Dyna Might finds out that she doesn't have a sidekick and she auditions the Lalaloopsies to find the perfect partner. Meanwhile, Jewel preps Cat for the big sidekick audition and goes a little overboard.
16	16	"A Little Goes a Long Way"	Melissa Suber	David Grubstick	July 18, 2013	TBA	N/A
Jewel babysits a few Littles while Mittens teaches Spot and Peanut how to ride a sled. However, trouble ensues when Trinket gets lost at the snowy mountains with the pet and get trapped inside a cave on Lalaloopsy Land.
17	17	"Rosy's Day Off"	Melissa Suber	David Grubstick	July 22, 2013	117	N/A
Rosy works so hard to take care of everyone else, so Blossom, Spot and Peanut take Rosy on a relaxing nature walk for a day off. Meanwhile, Charlotte's Invisible Pet goes missing and Crumbs tries to help find it.
18	18	"Sleepless in Lalaloopsy Land"	Melissa Suber	David Grubstick	July 23, 2013	118	N/A
Pillow catches younger sister Blanket Featherbed sleepwalking, so she comes up with ways to help Pillow get back to bed. Meanwhile, Bea is preparing for a school day with the Littles and practices with the pets.
19	19	"Don't Fence Me In"	Melissa Suber	Story by : Melody Fox and Carla Robinson; Teleplay by : Jeff Goode	July 24, 2013	119	N/A
Spot does some artwork on Sunny's fence but the Lalaloopsies don't understand Spot's interpretive way of seeing them. They ask Spot to do a straight forward portrait of each of them. Peanut and Elephant rehearse for a water act using their cannon.
20	20	"Blossom's Rare Plant"	Melissa Suber	Joseph Purdy	August 26, 2013	120	N/A
Blossom finds a rare "Unadia" plant that lives only for one day but doesn't bloom, so she recruits the Lalaloopsies to help Blossom. Peanut is practicing a new act called The Swinging Flinging Ring which requires a partner, but every time she gets a volunteer, they end up needing to help Blossom with her Unadia plant instead.
21	21	"Now You See Him, Now You Don't"	Melissa Suber	Story by : Jeff Goode; Teleplay by : David Grubstick	August 27, 2013	TBA	N/A
Misty Mysterious' magic trick goes wrong and the pet disappears, so Rabbit must find the red ball for Misty's magic trick all over Lalaloopsy Land. Jewel tries to make Specs' party "fancier" but the ball keeps breaking the layers.
22	22	"Dot and the Starcatcher"	Melissa Suber	Kris Marvin Hughes	August 28, 2013	122	N/A
Dot Starlight works to catch a falling star. However, once she has it, realizes she wants to share its beautify with everyone else, so with the Lalaloopsies' help, she sends it back up to the sky where everyone can enjoy its glow. Meanwhile, Berry gets a cold and refuses to go on an annual camping trip with Sunny. Jewel steps in for Berry, but she has a hard time figuring out how to rough it.
23	23	"Stuck on You"	Melissa Suber	Dean Stefan	August 29, 2013	123	N/A
Misty volunteers Forest and Jewel's for the brand-new trick. However, when Jewel and Forest's hands get stuck together inside of Misty's magical box, they must find a way to work together in order to come apart. Meanwhile Crumbs tries to make pretzels for Jewel's Princess Ball.
24	24	"Holly's Joyful Holiday"	Melissa Suber	Carin Greenberg	December 6, 2013	TBA	1.21
On Joyful Holiday, Holly finds a fast way to deliver all of the gifts to the other Lalaloopsies.
25	25	"Criss Cross Crisis"	Melissa Suber	Story by : Corey Powell; Teleplay by : Carin Greenberg	January 11, 2014	TBA	0.56
In the Button Harvest Festival, everyone's roles get mixed up while Jewel's pet cat accidentally mixes up the tin-canphone wires at the same time. Meanwhile, Jewel has to get the golden button when it accidentally rolls to the pond.
26	26	"Mablenut Muffin Mission"	Melissa Suber	Jeff Goode	January 25, 2014	126	0.69
On Sunny's birthday, Berry wants Crumbs to get a special rare ingredient for Sunny's surprise muffins.

=== Season 2 (2014–15) ===
No. overall	No. in season	Title	Directed by	Written by	Original release date
27	1	"Jewel's Jewel Chest"	Melissa Suber	David Grubstick	June 7, 2014
Jewel, Marina and Patch head out on a sea voyage to retrieve Jewel's "jewel" chest. Dot and Peanut fly in the hot air balloon to find the perfect spot to place a windsock in order to observe an oncoming windstorm.
28	2	"Balancing Act"	Melissa Suber	Jeff Goode	June 14, 2014
Peanut gives Rosy a bike but she must overcome the fear of riding it. Peanut and Prairie work together to create a circus rodeo while Elephant and Cactus take a ride with the hot air balloon.
29	3	"Nighty Knight"	Melissa Suber	Dean Stefan	June 21, 2014
Sir Battlescarred needs to find the Fear-Fighting Amulet in the Cave of Impenetrable Darkness in order to get rid of his fears. In the meantime, Jewel searches all over Lalaloopsy Land for a unique necklace to wear for a portrait that Spot will paint.
30	4	"Life of the Parties"	Melissa Suber	Jeff Goode	June 28, 2014
Mari Golden Petals goes overboard with the plans for Pillow's, Mittens' and Prairie's parties, when she realizes that she's planned them all on the same day. Ace and Peanut try to have a go-cart race using food and condiments as fuel.
31	5	"By the Book"	Melissa Suber	David Grubstick	July 21, 2014
Bea tries to reenact a Wild West adventure she read about in a book.
32	6	"Princess Spaghetti Day"	Melissa Suber	Jeff Goode	July 23, 2014
Spot and Pepper decide to have a Spaghetti Day. Spot invites Jewel, but Jewel is preparing for a visit from the French duchess Suzette La Sweet.
33	7	"Wishful Thinking"	Melissa Suber	Jeff Goode	July 25, 2014
Candle celebrates the birthday every day, and she likes to share them with everyone else. However, when she's unable to guess Dot's birthday wish, Candle tries hard to make it the best birthday ever; when Dyna Might loses the birthday gift from Candle, Ace tries to help her find it by making some improvements to the goggles.
34	8	"Misty's Magic Hero"	Melissa Suber	David Grubstick	August 2, 2014
Misty tries to find a new magic trick for Jewel's Princess Jamboree from the magic hero, Star Magic Spells. When the Princess Club elections are here, Jewel (for the first time ever) is running against an opponent, Suzette; and Tippy chooses between her two best friends to be elected as president of the club.
35	9	"Spot's New Masterpiece"	Melissa Suber	Dean Stefan	August 9, 2014
Spot sculpts a Lala out of white clay (coming to life and naming her Squiggles), who tries to be exactly like the Lalaloopsies so she may like Spot. Meanwhile, Forest tries to tap an untappable tree to get syrup from him.
36	10	"Spot Draws the Line"	Melissa Suber	Steven Darancette	August 16, 2014
Spot draws a doll called Trace E. Doodles out of chalk, and enters the magical world of chalk drawings with Trace.
37	11	"Trunk Show"	Melissa Suber	Kris Marvin Hughes	August 23, 2014
When Peanut loses her voice and can't help her pet elephant do his tightrope act in his show, she asks Pillow to be the new ringmaster. Marina teaches Whale how to tie a knot for a big boat trip with Rosy and Jewel.
38	12	"Mango's Mainland Holiday"	Melissa Suber	Steven Darancette	August 30, 2014
Patch has found a message in a coconut (leading to an island) and he meets Mango Tiki Wiki and her pet pineapple bird. He invites Mango to Lalaloopsy Land to meet the Lalaloopsies but they all act mean to Mango, so Bea tries to have a relaxing picnic day for herself.
39	13	"Knick Knack Knock Knock"	Melissa Suber	Steven Darancette	October 4, 2014
Specs searches for a Ghost Dog, so Bea follows Specs into a scary house by meeting the shy Scraps Stitched 'n Sewn.
40	14	"The Case of the Missing Pickles"	Melissa Suber	Story by : Carin Greenberg; Teleplay by : Kevin Monk	October 11, 2014
When Pickles discovers that all of the pickles are gone on the day of the pickle pudding premiere, she and Hot Dog most play detective to find out who stole the pickles. Meanwhile, Tippy and Ember work on safety precautions.
41	15	"So Near and Yet So Far"	Melissa Suber	Kevin Monk	October 18, 2014
Dot and the Lalaloopsies meet a friend from space named Haley Galaxy and the pet alien and they need their help getting back home. Ace tries have a fun playdate for his monkey and his friends.
42	16	"Eight Legged Friend"	Melissa Suber	Jymn Magon	October 25, 2014
Jewel has to take care of a spider for a week and be friends with her, but Cat feels left out. Forest takes Trinket, Specs and Scribbles to a timber ranger camp out.
43	17	"Belly Laugh"	Melissa Suber	Steven Darancette	November 1, 2014
When Forest's stomach begins to giggle, Rosy moves in with him to find a cure but acts really annoying. Peanut thinks that Elephant is laughing at what she does, so she creates an act about it.
44	18	"Cherry on Top"	Melissa Suber	Story by : Vivien Mejía; Teleplay by : Steven Darancette	December 6, 2014
Crumbs discovers that Blossom has hired another baker to bake a cake for the birthday (the Cherry Crisp Crust), so Blossom has to rid the weeds for the earth day birthday party on Lalaloopsy Land.
45	19	"Winter's Wonderful Ice and Snow Show"	Melissa Suber	Story by : Bryan Thompson; Teleplay by : Kevin Monk	December 27, 2014
Winter invites Spot, Pickles and Mittens to ice skate in the "ice-and-snow" show edition.
46	20	"Peppyball!"	Melissa Suber	Steven Darancette	February 16, 2015
Peppy Pom Poms invents a new sport (called the Peppyball) so she can have something big to cheer for. Meanwhile, Crumbs tries to make souffle rise at the same time.
47	21	"Out on a Limb"	Melissa Suber	Dean Stefan	June 6, 2015
When Mittens, Peanut and Forest get stuck up a tree, Ember and Dyna Might compete but fail to rescue them, so Spot tries to learn good in Beaver's wood chopping class.
48	22	"Pet Peeve"	Melissa Suber	David Grubstick	June 6, 2015
When Ace builds Forest a wood-chopping machine, Beaver feels unneeded and wanders off searching for someone else who needs him.
49	23	"Blossom's Amazing Amazies"	Melissa Suber	Dean Stefan	July 13, 2015
Blossom finds rare flowers and uses them to help the Lalaloopsies grow gardens in their inhospitable climates. Peppy supports Misty's magic act with the cheers.
50	24	"Two Pirates are Better Than One"	Melissa Suber	Dean Stefan	July 15, 2015
Patch meets Peggy Seven Seas.
51	25	"No Laughing Matter"	Melissa Suber	Steven Darancette	July 17, 2015
Peanut attempts to pull a prank on Dyna Might but it backfires (inadvertently putting Sprinkle's mouse in danger) and, feeling sorry, Peanut decides to end the work as Lalaloopsy Land's funny circus act.
52	26	"A Little Change of Place"	Melissa Suber	Kevin Monk	September 14, 2015
Trinket and Squirt trade places for 24 hours.
