= List of American Dragon: Jake Long episodes =

The following is an episode list for the Disney Channel original animated series American Dragon: Jake Long, created by Jeff Goode.

American Dragon: Jake Long tells the story of 13-year-old Jake Long (Dante Basco) who must balance ordinary adolescence with the ability to change into the form of a dragon who has to overcome obstacles to protect the magical creatures living in New York City. Jake navigates the city with fellow skateboarders Trixie (Miss Kittie) and Spud (Charlie Finn) with help from his maternal grandfather (Keone Young), his Grandpa's gruff sidekick, a magical Shar Pei named Fu Dog (John DiMaggio) and the love of his life Rose (Mae Whitman).

During the course of the series, 52 episodes of American Dragon: Jake Long aired over two seasons, between January 21, 2005, and September 1, 2007.

== Series overview ==
Season	Episodes	Originally released	
Season	Episodes	First released	Last released
1	21	January 21, 2005	January 29, 2006
Special		July 1, 2005	
2	31	June 10, 2006	September 1, 2007

== Episodes ==
=== Season 1 (2005–06) ===
Note: All episodes in this season were directed by Christian Roman.

No. overall	No. in season	Title	Written by	Storyboard by	Original release date	Prod. code
1	1	"Old School Training"	Eddie Guzelian	Dave Filoni & Stephen Lewis	January 21, 2005	101
Jake is fed up when Grandpa leads him through a series of disgusting and seemingly pointless workout drills, causing him to avoid his training. When Grandpa is caught alone by Huntsman and Huntsgirl, Jake has to use the "pointless" training with Grandpa to fight Huntsman and save the day. Note: This episode originally premiered in the UK on December 19, 2004.
2	2	"Dragon Breath"	Laura McCreary	Rick Del Carmen & Ken Laramay	January 22, 2005	103
When Jake has a bad case of dragon breath, he finds himself without a date for an upcoming school dance, and asks Fu Dog for help. After dealing with the dragon breath, they head to Magus Bazaar, where Jake meets and asks out Jasmine. After the dance is thrown into chaos when Jasmine is revealed to be a nix and loses control of herself, Jake must bring her back to normal and protect the school's students from having their souls stolen.
3	3	"The Talented Mr. Long"	Laura McCreary	Wendy Grieb & Dave Knott	January 28, 2005	106
After an attempt by Professor Rotwood to steal the school talent show trophy, Jake discovers that the trophy is Eranushi's chalice, a magical goblet containing a great evil. In order to recover the trophy, Jake must take on Spud the Magnificent and risk losing their friendship while preventing Rotwood from unleashing the chalice's evil.
4	4	"The Legend of the Dragon Tooth"	Catherine Lieuwen	Chris Harmon, Chong Lee & Victor Cook	February 4, 2005	105
Jake, Trixie and Spud try to juggle the responsibility of babysitying Jake's little sister Haley with their plans to attend the 3rd Annual Hip-Hop Video Awards by taking turns in both roles. Meanwhile, Dr. Diente, the tooth fairy's villainous assistant, tries to kidnap Haley for her dragon tooth. Jake must defeat Dr. Diente and his toothy minions and save Haley.
5	5	"Act 4, Scene 15"	Matthew Negrete	Rick Del Carmen & Ken Laramay	February 11, 2005	109
Wanting an excuse to spend time with the girl of his dreams, Jake auditions for the role of Antony to act opposite Rose's Cleopatra in the school play. Meanwhile, he must also protect a mystical Egyptian scarab from falling into the hands of the Huntsclan.: Note: This episode chronologically comes after "Professor Rotwood's Thesis".
6a	6a	"Adventures In Troll Sitting"	Jeff Goode	Nathan Chew	February 18, 2005	104a
When a troll shows up on Jake's doorstep and requests refuge from the sun, Jake has to hide him and his sentient hairballs from his parents. His task becomes more complicated when his aunt Patchouli comes to visit the family.
6b	6b	"Fu Dog Takes a Walk"	Jeff Goode	Scott Shaw	February 18, 2005	104b
Fu Dog's journey to a Yankee game ends with him trying to escape a mad dog catcher on a quest to capture every breed of dog.
7	7	"Professor Rotwood's Thesis"	Eddie Guzelian	Nathan Chew, Lenord Robinson & Victor Cook	February 25, 2005	107
In an attempt to raise enough money to replace the vase that they accidentally broke, Jake, Spud and Trixie try to find proof about a mystery creature (the American dragon) that Professor Rotwood takes a blurry picture of. Spud and Trixie soon find out about Jake's dragon ability after unknowingly giving Jake over to Rotwood. Together with Lao Shi and Fu Dog, they successfully rescue Jake and later Spud and Trixie tell Jake that they are happy to be his friends regardless of his secrets. Meanwhile, Rotwood begins to suspect that Jake might be the American Dragon.: Note: This episode chronologically comes before "Act 4, Scene 15".
8a	8a	"The Egg"	Elijah Aron	Stephen Lewis	March 25, 2005	108a
A jeopardized Griffin egg leads Jake and Fu on a frenzied romp through New York City, as they have to get the egg when the Huntsclan steals it.
8b	8b	"The Heist"	Mark Myers	Dave Filoni	March 25, 2005	108b
Jake, Grandpa, Trixie, Spud and Fu Dog have to stumble through an elaborate robbery to get the stolen gold of a leprechaun from a millionaire dark wizard named Eli Pandarus.
9	9	"Dragon Summit"	Brandon Sawyer	Stephen Lewis & Dave Filoni	April 1, 2005	111
Jake and Grandpa attend the World Dragon Summit, where the former's apparent immaturity causes the Dragon Council to call for a test of his skill and judgement. Meanwhile, Jake finds himself in a prank war with Fred Nerk, the Australian Dragon. Over the course of the tests, he gets to know the story of his grandfather and his struggles against the infamous Dark Dragon.: Note: This episode chronologically comes after "Shapeshifter".
10	10	"Body Guard Duty"	Laura McCreary	Chris Harmon & Chong Lee	April 29, 2005	110
Jake is assigned as a bodyguard to the Oracle Twins, Kara and Sara. When he brings them to school, they go from causing mischief to helping him cheat on his mythology test.
11	11	"Shapeshifter"	Matthew Negrete	Wendy Grieb & Dave Knott	May 13, 2005	102
Jake acquires shapeshifting abilities for a dragon mission. He misuses them to get out of a parent-teacher conference and to impress his peers, but eventually lands himself in trouble with the Huntsclan when his overuse of the power causes it to malfunction.: Note: This episode chronologically comes before "Dragon Summit".
12	12	"The Ski Trip"	Laura McCreary	Chris Harmon & Chong Lee	May 27, 2005	115
While Jake, Trixie, and Spud are attending a school-sponsored ski trip, Jake begins an investigation to find out the Huntsgirl's true identity while trying to make time for himself with Rose. When Trixie finds out something unusual about Rose, Jake tries to ignore it, but later finds out that Rose is the Huntsgirl.
13	13	"The Long Weekend"	Jim Peronto	Wendy Grieb & Dave Knott	July 1, 2005	112
In an attempt to bond with his son, Jonathan takes Jake, Trixie, and Spud on a camping trip into the New Jersey woods, but Jake finds his father's actions embarrassing. When a tribe of forest spirits request Jake's help fending off a beast known as the Jersey Devil, he splits from the camp and sets out to defeat it. Meanwhile, Susan and Haley go on a weekend wellness trip, but end up in a boot camp.
14	14	"Eye of the Beholder"	Chris Nee	Nathan Chew & Lenord Robinson	July 30, 2005	114
Fu Dog goes undercover as a candidate in the Miss Magical World beauty pageant to prevent Eli Pandarus from kidnapping Miss Magical World, the missing part of his diabolical plan to become the most powerful dark wizard. While Jake and Grandpa try to uncover his plans and fight Pandarus, Fu Dog takes a look at how he often treats women as objects.: Note: This episode chronologically comes after "The Hunted". The pageant host was voiced by Monty Hall.
15	15	"Jake Takes the Cake"	Jeff Goode	Dave Filoni & Stephen Lewis	August 26, 2005	116
During a wedding anniversary, Jake accidentally releases a gremlin at his mother's grand catering gig for the "Wedding of the Century" between two famous soap opera stars, Thad Rochefort-Chaise and Jasma Sancere. To stop the chaos, Jake has only one solution: risk publicly embarrassing himself by singing a song called "The Hubba Hubba Hula" during the television broadcast of the wedding.
16	16	"Hong Kong Knights"	Matthew Negrete	Rick Del Carmen, Louie del Carmen & Stephen Lewis	September 8, 2005	120
After another trip to the principal's office, Jake finds out he has to write a 15-page essay about his role model in life. Trixie & Spud suggested Jake write about Grandpa, and Fu Dog later tells them the story of Lao Shi's days as a swinging super agent in Hong Kong in 1972. He shares how Grandpa met him and Councilor Chang, and how he completely changed after defeating the Dark Dragon. After hearing Fu's story, Jake realizes that Chang is working with the Dark Dragon, and he and his "army" sets out to find and rescue Grandpa from Chang and the Dark Dragon. After his defeat, the Dark Dragon swears vengeance on Jake.: Notes: This episode chronologically comes after "The Halloween Bash".
17	17	"The Halloween Bash"	Scott M. Gimple	Rick Del Carmen & Ken Laramay	October 22, 2005	118
While Grandpa takes Haley trick or treating, Jake seizes the opportunity to throw the wildest Halloween party ever mixing humans and magical creatures. When the Dragon Council show up at the shop for a surprise inspection of Jake, they are disappointed with his lax attitude and take away his powers.: Notes: Ingrid Third from Fillmore! makes a cameo. This episode chronologically comes before "Hong Kong Knights".
18a	18a	"Fu and Tell"	Mark Drop	Rick Del Carmen	November 3, 2005	113a
Fu Dog has to endure the extreme indignation of Haley's elementary school class "Show and Tell" and at the same time face an old nemesis.
18b	18b	"Flight of the Unicorn"	Mark Drop	Ken Laramay	November 3, 2005	113b
Jake, Trixie and Spud must transport a unicorn from Coney Island to Central Park during rush hour while escaping the freak show carnival crowd.
19	19	"Keeping Shop"	Laura McCreary	Nathan Chew, Lenord Robinson & Marty Warner	January 6, 2006	119
When Grandpa and Jake leave New York City for the Dragon Retreat, Fu Dog, Trixie and Spud are in charge of the electronics store. When a gang of Biker Trolls start terrorizing the Magus Bazaar, Trixie and Spud are forced to don a dragon costume and stumble their way through the American Dragon's duties to get rid of them.
20	20	"Ring Around the Dragon"	Brandon Sawyer	Dave Knott & Wendy Grieb	January 12, 2006	117
Hijinks and hilarity abound as Jake goes undercover as a professional wrestler "Dragonfire" in the King Extreme Wrestling League ("K.E.W.L.") to rescue a runaway giant.
21	21	"The Hunted"	Eddie Guzelian	Chris Harmon & Chong Lee	January 29, 2006	121
After Huntsman's wounds are definitively healed, Jake is trapped along with a group of incompetent magical outsiders and has a confrontation with Huntsgirl that will determine whether or not Rose would give up her Huntsclan lifestyle if she learned the truth behind his identity. When Rose finds out Jake is the American Dragon, she spares his life and frees him, but the next day Jake learns that Rose has left Millard Fillmore Middle School, leaving for him a picture of the two of them from the school dance.: Note: This episode chronologically comes before "Eye of the Beholder".

=== Crossover special (2005) ===
Title	Directed by	Written by	Storyboarded by	Original release date	Prod. code
"Morpholomew"	Victor Cook	Brandon Sawyer	Broni Likomanov, Louie Del Carmen and Troy Adomitis	July 1, 2005	225 (L&S:TS)
Keoni Jameson is going away for the weekend, so Lilo uses a shapeshifting experiment (X-316) to transform into him and win a skateboarding competition. At the same time, Jake, Trixie, Spud, Gramps, and Fu Dog visit the island to investigate reports that magical creatures (the other experiments) are running rampant.: Notes: The events of this crossover episode occur during the second and final season of Lilo & Stitch: The Series.

=== Season 2 (2006–07) ===
Note: All main, recurring, and supporting characters have vastly different appearances compared to the first season, as a new hand-drawn animation team and style was brought in order to give the show a sleeker look. The animation had been provided by Wang Film Productions (14 episodes), Starburst Animation (10 episodes), and Jade Animation (7 episodes).

No. in season	Title	Directed by	Written by	Storyboarded by	Original release date	Prod. code	
22	1	"Bring It On"	Steve Loter	Eddie Guzelian	Cynthia Petrovic, Robb Pratt and Adam Van Wyk	June 10, 2006	203
Jake learns that one of the three evil Gorgon sisters, Fury, has mysteriously returned to life after Professor Rotwood accidentally disturbs her at the museum, and is magically entrancing the school cheerleaders to help her return her sisters, Euryale and Medusa to life. Now, Trixie must infiltrate the tight-knit group of cheerleaders to stop them from taking over the world.
23	2	"Half Baked"	Steve Loter	Matt Negrete	Nick Filippi and Kyle Menke	June 24, 2006	201
Three months have gone by since Jake and Rose's last encounter at the end of the first season. He is determined to find her and asks Fu Dog to help him with a magical potion to open a portal to locate her, but when the magical ingredients accidentally get swapped with the cupcakes they are baking for the school carnival, Jake has to decide between finding Rose or saving the carnival-goers.
24	3	"The Academy"	Steve Loter	Eddie Guzelian	Eugene Salandra and James Yang	July 1, 2006	204
After hearing a prediction from Sara Oracle that the entire magical world will be in danger from the Huntsclan, Spud joins Jake on a mission where they go undercover as students at the Huntsclan Academy to recover details about their plan. At the Academy they are reunited with Rose, who helps them with their mission and confesses to Jake that it is too dangerous for her to leave the Huntsclan.
25	4	"The Doppelganger Gang"	Steve Loter	Chris Nee	Wendy Grieb, Kyle Menke and Adam Van Wyk	July 8, 2006	209
When Jake is overwhelmed by his hectic dragon responsibilities, he decides to use his dragon powers to create doppelganger copies of himself to help ease the load. But his plan quickly backfires when one of the clones turns against him.
26	5	"Something Fishy This Way Comes"	Steve Loter	Brandon Sawyer	Louie Del Carmen and Octavio E. Rodriguez	July 15, 2006	206
Jake's life is thrown into chaos when he accidentally starts a relationship between Grandpa and his principal, Ms. Derceto. Meanwhile, a ferocious, shape-shifting beast called Kelpie is preying on magical creatures, and Jake begins to suspects that his school principal is the creature after he runs into her while investigating an attack. After finding out that Ms. Derceto is actually an undercover mermaid detective investigating the Kelpie, they team up to catch it. Jake comes to terms with Grandpa's possible relationship with her, but it turns out that Ms. Derceto will have to leave New York City for another mission. As a result, Professor Rotwood replaces her as the new principal of the school.
27	6	"Breakout"	Steve Loter	Amy Wolfram	Troy Adomitis, David Bullock, Edward Rivera, Eugene Salandra and Adam Van Wyk	July 29, 2006	208
Rose wants to spend some time apart from Jake after the Huntsman's newest apprentices, Huntsboy #88 and Huntsboy #89, see her and Jake together. But after he pairs up with Rose for a school project, Jake becomes obsessed with his appearance when he starts going through his first ten-year dragon molting cycle, causing him to adopt a temporarily grotesque appearance. He must overcome his fear of showing his face to Rose in order to help her thwart the newly-revealed plot of the Huntsman. When the problem is solved thanks to Trixie and Spud's school project, Rose gives Jake one of her dream charms so that they can meet in their dreams.
28	7	"Family Business"	Steve Loter	Chris Nee	David Bullock, Wendy Grieb, Kyle Menke and Adam Van Wyk	August 5, 2006	205
Jake is stunned to discover that Haley has begun dragon training. When she begins outperforming him at various tasks, a jealous Jake pulls a prank making her powers go out of control, but he must set things right when it leads to her life being put in danger.
29	8	"Hero of the Hourglass"	Steve Loter	Chris Parrish	Louie Del Carmen and Octavio E. Rodriguez	August 12, 2006	202
Jake is frustrated with having to hide his dragon duties from his father. After learning that his mother had once almost given Jonathan a letter that explained the dragon side of their family, Jake uses a time travel device to travel back in time and make sure that the letter was read. After Jonathan reacts badly and breaks up with Susan, Jake has to fix things before he and Haley disappear forever.
30	9	"Dreamscape"	Steve Loter	Curtis Chin	Louie Del Carmen and Octavio E. Rodriguez	August 19, 2006	210
While using his Dream Charm to have secret dates with Rose, Jake gets the idea to use his charm to access Rotwood's mind and obtain the answer key for a future test. But when he inadvertently releases a dangerous Chimera creature into the Dream Realm, Jake, Rose, Spud, and Trixie must work quickly in order to stop it. During which, Rose discovers she was stolen by the Huntsclan at birth.: One of the doors shown in the Dreamscape is labeled 'Nick Filippi', who is a director for the series.
31	10	"A Befuddled Mind"	Nick Filippi	Chris Nee	Louie Del Carmen and Octavio E. Rodriguez	September 9, 2006	214
Tired of Spud hiding his intelligence from everyone, Jake gets Spud to take a standardized test for him but changes the name back to Spud's, resulting in the Manhattan Genius Institute recruiting Spud against his own desires. Meanwhile, Jake, Trixie and Fu Dog must try and recover Pandora's box from the dark wizard Eli Pandarus before he uses it to take over the magical world. It is revealed that the box has been outfitted with a puzzle that locks it, and Pandarus has taken over the Genius Institute to find someone talented enough to solve it. When Spud manages to crack the code, he is kidnapped by Pandarus, but Jake and Trixie manage to rescue Spud and recover Pandora's box. Later, Spud comes to accept his genius and decides to consider advanced classes.: Note: The episode's title is rendered as "A Mind Befuddled" on Disney+.
32	11	"Fool's Gold"	Nick Filippi	Brandon Sawyer	Frank Jen, Kyle Menke and Robb Pratt	September 16, 2006	211
After being humiliated by Brad for being short on cash, Jake gets sucked into the bling-bling lifestyle when he accepts a leprechaun's gold as payment for saving them from goblins. He starts working for a leprechaun "import-export business" headed by Brocamas, against Grandpa's counsel telling him to give the gold back to the leprechaun. But after a sinister deal with the Huntsclan may end up bringing an end to all magical creatures, Jake confesses to Grandpa and together with the goblins, they recover the package from the Huntclan, following which Jake quits Brocamas' employ.
33	12	"Feeding Frenzy"	Nick Filippi	Chris Parrish	Tom Bernardo and Wendy Grieb	September 23, 2006	213
When the Longs and Fu Dog attend a family reunion at Jake's aunt Cathy's house on an island in the Florida Keys, Jake is angry that he is passed over for a seat at the adults' table in lieu of his younger cousin, Greggy, who has just come into his dragon powers. Meanwhile, Grandpa tries to steer Jonathan away from the reunion by dragging him on a road trip across the country. Jake, frustrated by everyone's attitude towards his responsibilities and abilities, engages Greggy in a contest of skill, but is further angered when Greggy attacks a friendly shark lady who attempts to contact them. Later, she reveals that a group of shark terrorists headed by Tiburón plots to flood half of the continent by using Poseidon's trident. Tiburón gets the trident, but Jake and Greggy follow him and Jake manages to defeat Tiburón and save Greggy. When they return, Jake tries to share the victory with Greggy, but a brawl ensues when Greggy want all the credits, and the situation devolves as other arguments break out. When Grandpa and Jonathan finally arrive for the next dinner, everyone but the two of them is relegated to the kids' table.
34	13	"Haley Gone Wild"	Nick Filippi	Brandon Sawyer	Troy Adomitis, Eugene Salandra and Alan Wan	September 30, 2006	216
Tired of her goody-two-shoes attitude, Jake teaches Haley to be "bad". Unfortunately, she gets addicted and starts to go too far when she watches a show called Pooka Pooka Fun-Fun Farm, which Jonathan had forbidden her. While talking with Sun about Haley's recent attitude, Jake finds out that the character in the show is actually a magical Pooka who uses mind control spells through song to brainwash his victims. Now, Jake and Sun must save her and the rest of the kids from the Pooka and cancel its TV show. Unable to best Haley, Jake calls his parents and admits to all the rules they broke, causing Haley to blame the Pooka's influence for getting her in trouble and defeat the Pooka. They end up having to face a long period of punishment for their rulebreaking.
35	14	"Supernatural Tuesday"	Nick Filippi	Chris Bowman	Wendy Grieb, Frank Jen, Jim Shellhorn and Alan Wan	October 28, 2006	221
Jake is competing for student body president against a new exchange student, Nigel Thrall, after being embarrassed by him at the skate park. As Nigel holds an edge in the election surveys, Jake decides to sneak into Nigel's campaign headquarters after class. There, he discovers that Nigel is a wizard, and Nigel discovers that Jake is a dragon. In order to find out the issues that students care about, Jake uses a magical helmet to read their minds, unknowingly leading Maximinus, the Ogre who used to wield the helmet to the electronics store and the school. Jake and Nigel have to work together to defeat Maximinus, while Spud and Trixie try to distract the school by discussing their ideas and platforms. In the end, Jake and Nigel made up and decide to support each other if they win, but Spud and Trixie win and together become the new student body presidents.
36	15	"The Rotwood Files"	Nick Filippi	Scott Gimple	Carin-Anne Greco and James Yang	November 18, 2006	215
Jake is tired of Principal Rotwood always giving him a hard time, and inadvertently gets Rotwood fired after a prank. The new principal, Sigmund Brock, seems great initially, but things get worse as he finds out that Sigmund was Rotwood's professor and also seeks magical creatures. After watching Jake fend off magical creatures he planted, he quickly deduces that the American Dragon is either Jake, Trixie or Spud. When Sigmund reveals that he has developed a serum that will reveal the true form of dragons, Jake strikes a partnership with Rotwood to get rid of Sigmund, but their partnership ends when Jake lets slip that he got Rotwood fired. Rotwood then seemingly sells out the gang to Sigmund, but double crosses him and ruins his reveal to have himself reinstated as principal. However thanks to Sigmund's serum, Rotwood finally know that Jake is the American Dragon.
37	16	"A Hairy Christmas"	Steve Loter	Chris Parrish	Carin-Anne Greco and Robb Pratt	December 16, 2006	207
Jake, feeling embarrassed by his family's Christmas traditions, argues with his father about changing their traditions. When it turns out that a baby sasquatch has been separated from its family, Jake must find the baby and reunite them in order to avoid a sasquatch rampage, but his having to leave puts further strain on the argument. Meanwhile, Trixie's father is stuck in a military base in Greenland due to their planes being iced over, and almost misses Christmas with his family, but manages to reach them on Christmas day with some help from Jake.
38	17	"Switcheroo"	Nick Filippi	Eddie Guzelian	Tom Bernardo and Wendy Grieb	January 6, 2007	217
Jake and Haley are forced to re-examine their sibling rivalry when an enchanted mirror they got from Huntsboy #88 and Huntsboy #89, switches their bodies for a day and each must comically experience life as the other. But when the Huntsboys try to steal the mirror again, Jake and Haley have to work together to get it back before remaining at each other bodies forever.: Note: This episode chronologically comes after "The Love Cruise".
39	18	"The Love Cruise"	Steve Loter	Scott Gimple	Troy Adomitis, Lyndon Ruddy and Eugene Salandra	February 3, 2007	212
Jake has become too distracted because of Rose, and so Grandpa warn Rose to never see him again. And when Cupid goes on vacation, he leaves his magical bow and arrows with Jake, who brings them in his school's "Love Cruise" to use on Rose, as he mistakenly thinks she doesn't love him anymore. But the plan goes awry when Rose becomes hateful of Jake, and almost lets the Huntsclan know about his identity. Once the problem solved, Rose decides to maintain distances from him, so that Jake can focus a lot more on his duties.: Note: This episode chronologically comes before "Switcheroo".
40	19	"Year of the Jake"	Nick Filippi	Vince Cheung & Ben Montanio	Troy Adomitis, Carin-Anne Greco and Lyndon Ruddy	February 18, 2007	224
Out of touch with his Chinese heritage and unwilling to participate in the festivities, Jake volunteers to watch his grandpa's shop while he's off doing his own holiday traditions. Jake's ignorance of Chinese culture soon shows its dangers when he inadvertently curses the magical shop with bad luck by cleaning the shop, causing a series of escalating calamities, including three evil demons that escape their prison and wreak havoc on the city.
41	20	"Homecoming"	Steve Loter	Matt Negrete	Louie Del Carmen, Kyle Menke and Octavio E. Rodriguez	March 10, 2007	218
Jake and Rose are nominated for Homecoming King and Queen for their school's upcoming homecoming dance, and Jake believes it to be the perfect opportunity to continue pursuing his relationship with Rose. However, the Huntsman discovers Rose's treachery and forces her to betray Jake and help the Huntsclan to get a magic skulls that can make every wishes come true. In the end, Rose uses the magic skulls to destroy the Huntsman and the Huntsclan for good, but is affected as well. To save Rose, Jake makes a wish that Rose was never taken by the Huntsclan before destroying the skulls. The next day, Jake finds a memory-less Rose at school who has been reunited with her family and has no memory of him. Rose moves to Hong Kong, but Jake is happy as long as Rose is happy.: Note: During the credits former Huntsclan 88 and 89 are still around and trying to get a new job, wondering what it would be like if they do get suck into the vortex.
42	21	"Young at Heart"	Nick Filippi	Laura McCreary	Carin-Anne Greco and Robb Pratt	March 24, 2007	220
Jake wants to become an adult after being embarrassed by his dad driving him to school, and humiliated by Brad as he is old enough to drive. Soon after, he, Trixie and Spud have a fight with a youth-sucking demon called an Avemetrus, which causes them to lose their youth the next day. While Jake has turned into a 21-year-old, Spud and Trixie become elderly 80-year-olds. Just like Jake has wished, he is enjoying the lifestyle of being an adult, whereas Trixie and Spud have to stay at the elderly house for magical creatures. But Jake soon realizes that the life of an adult may not be as glamorous as he first thought, when the police want to arrest him for all the trouble he accidentally made, and because Grandpa got hit by the Avemetrus which costs him not much time left to live. So Jake (alongside with Haley) defeats the Avemetrus, and everyone gets their youth back.
43	22	"Siren Says"	Nick Filippi	Brandon Sawyer	Carin-Anne Greco and Robb Pratt	April 7, 2007	222
Hoping to get back into the realm of dating, Jake enters a bachelor auction at his school held by Trixie and Spud. When only two girls compete in bids for him (the pretty girl Danika Hunnicutt and the sci-fi nerd Vicky Fickling), Jake rigs the bid so that Danika can win. Trixie criticizes him for only caring about looks, and she begins to suspect the possibility that Danika is a siren who hypnotizes Jake into doing whatever she asks. After gathering all the evidence, Jake have no choice but to go out with Vicky at the weekend party. However, it turns out that Vicky is the one behind everything by giving the siren necklace to Danika, and it's up to Trixie to defeat Vicky while dealing with the hypnotized Jake, Spud and Fu Dog.
44	23	"Shaggy Frog"	Nick Filippi	Johanna Stein	Louie Del Carmen, Octavio E. Rodriguez and Jim Shellhorn	April 28, 2007	223
Jealous of Jake's magical powers and hero status, Spud feels incompetent in his own abilities. But when a magical frog bites him during an attempt to prove himself as a hero, he develops magical frog-like abilities that he uses to gain popularity.
45	24	"Nobody's Fu"	Nick Filippi	Chris Nee	Wendy Grieb and Adam Van Wyk	May 12, 2007	225
Jake's loyalty in Fu Dog wanes as he constantly fails to help him out in their partnership. When Fu allows his animal guardian license to expire once again, Jake is assigned a temporary animal guardian: a monkey named Bananas B., to whom he quickly takes a liking, to the extent of ignoring Fu Dog, causing the latter to lose his chance at renewing his licence. But the true loyalty of the animal helper is put to the test when Councilor Chang escapes from the magical prison to exact revenge on Jake and Lao Shi.
46	25	"Magic Enemy Number 1"	Nick Filippi	Brandon Sawyer	Troy Adomitis, Lyndon Ruddy and Jim Shellhorn	June 2, 2007	228
With Rotwood knowing Jake is a dragon, he sets up a campaign of humiliating him in school in order to get him to slip up and expose himself as his birthday present. Tired of Rotwood's persistence, Jake goes on an online blog where he thinks he will not be noticed, and gets misinterpreted by the magical community, thinking that a bounty is now out on Rotwood's head. Now, Jake must protect Rotwood from various magical bounty hunters out for the reward. To make up for the blog, Jake takes Rotwood to Magus Bazaar as his birthday present, and Rotwood agrees to remove Jake's humiliating campaign.
47	26	"A Ghost Story"	Nick Filippi	Chris Nee	Lyndon Ruddy, Eugene Salandra and James Yang	June 16, 2007	219
When Jake, Trixie and Spud become junior counselors at "Camp Mugwomp", Jake relives old camp game rivalries with Brad. Meanwhile, a vengeful group of ghosts plans to take revenge on the living occupants of the camp by kidnapping the winners of an upcoming camp race.
48	27	"Bite Father, Bite Son"	Nick Filippi	Chris Bowman	Carin-Anne Greco, Robb Pratt and Adam Van Wyk	June 17, 2007	227
Jonathan drags Jake to his office for "Take Your Child to Work Day". Simultaneously, a group of dangerous vampires called Strigoi, who survive by draining the blood of dragons, come to New York City and accidentally target Jonathan as the American Dragon instead of Jake. The Strigoi then try to kill Jonathan at Spud's mother's Italian restaurant, but later retreat because of sunlight. Soon after, Jake complains that his dad is a wimp to a girl named Marnie and hurts his feelings when Jonathan overhears Jake's word. At night, Jake tries to defeat the Strigoi but gets weakened by the Sphinx's hair. Jonathan sees a defeated Jake in human form and begins battling the Strigoi while Jake makes the final move to kill them once and for all. Jake apologizes to Jonathan and the two spend time together at Rockaway beach the next day.
49	28	"Game On"	Nick Filippi	Sean Whalen	Louie Del Carmen, Octavio E. Rodriguez and Adam Van Wyk	July 1, 2007	226
Frustrated by life's unexpected twists and turns, Jake meets three witches and uses a magical device that lets Jake control his life like a video game – full of fast forwards, rewinds, and power-ups.
50	29	"Furious Jealousy"	Nick Filippi	Vince Cheung & Ben Montanio	Carin-Anne Greco, Wendy Grieb, Robb Pratt and Octavio E. Rodriguez	July 7, 2007	229
Trixie and Spud are planning for the school's dance, and Spud wants to ask Stacey for the dance. But when he finds out that Nigel will also ask Stacey for the dance, a jealous Spud decides to do anything to win her affection, including striking an unholy deal with the accidentally-released Fury. Meanwhile, with seemingly no crime for weeks on end, Jake becomes immensely overweight by eating massive amounts of junk food, to Trixie's dismay. When Fury unlocks her sisters, they turn Jake into stone and Spud has to ask Nigel for help. Jake soon gets back to life, and is able to turn Euryale and Medusa into stone, while Fury managed to run away. Back at school, Jake promises to lose weight so that Trixie can take him for the dance, whereas Spud apologizes to Stacey about everything. But Stacey soon confesses that she's actually like him and just doesn't want to show that in public, and they both share the dance in the school's basement.
51	30	"Being Human"	Nick Filippi	Matt Negrete	Carin-Anne Greco, Robb Pratt and Lyndon Ruddy	August 4, 2007	230
Jake is stressed when he realizes how his duties as the American Dragon have kept him from having a normal school life. So he intentionally lets the Dragon Council suspend him from his duties for a week, in order to get the most out of his middle school graduation, and let Haley become the American Dragon. But Haley soon realizes that handling this great new responsibility has affected much of her reputation. Meanwhile, a vengeful Chang is trying to revive the Dark Dragon by taking the chi of the American Dragon, so she mistakenly captures Jake instead of Haley. After Haley accidentally reveals the truth to Grandpa and Sun and got them upset, she blames both of them for putting too much pressure on the American Dragon duties. Jake gets his dragon power back and defeats Chang, but his blood inadvertently hits the ground and resurrects the Dark Dragon.
52	31	"The Hong Kong Longs"	Nick Filippi	Eddie Guzelian	Troy Adomitis, Carin-Anne Greco, Louie Del Carmen, Calvin Suggs, Nick Filippi and Adam Van Wyk	September 1, 2007	231
Jake and his family, along with Spud and Trixie, take a trip to Hong Kong for summer vacation. But Grandpa reveals to Jake that the real reason for the trip is the Dragon Council's Thousand Year Toast at a temple that appears once every thousand years at the top of a nearby mountain. When the Dark Dragon kidnaps Lao Shi, Jake tracks down Rose and tries to convince her to help them. However, Rose refuses to believe him and calls the police to arrest Jake instead. While preparing for the battle to come, Jonathan learns the truth after seeing Haley's dragon form and begins to accepts it after hearing Jake is missing. Jake betrays the Dark Dragon and a battle erupts between the dragons, Spud, Trixie, Fu and Jake's family on one side, and the Dark Dragon's shadow forces on the other. Jake's father destroys the Dark Dragon's demons while Haley and Sun capture Chang. Rose eventually joins the battle. Together, Jake and Rose banish the Dark Dragon to another dimension for a thousand years; after which they kiss, explaining she found a picture of the two of them together, which restored her memory.
