= Jeff Goode =

American dramatist

- Born: Los Angeles, California, U.S.
- Education: University of Iowa (MFA)
- Occupations: Playwright, screenwriter

Jeff Goode is an American television writer and playwright, best known as the creator of Disney Channel's American Dragon: Jake Long and the author of the stage play The Eight: Reindeer Monologues. Goode has written several pilots for television, including MTV's Undressed.

In 2006, he was named Broadway Play Publishing Inc.'s Playwright of the Year. B P P I has published his plays Dracula Rides Again, Larry and the Werewolf, Love Loves A Pornographer and Marley's Ghost. In 2007, he received the Los Angeles Drama Critics Circle Award and the Back Stage Garland Award for his play Love Loves a Pornographer.

He is a founding member of the original No Shame Theatre in Iowa City.

== Selected works ==
=== Plays ===
- The Elf (1987)
- Dead Panther Cabaret (1989)
- Waiting On Godot (1990)
- Escape From Eldorado (1990)
- Dead Poets (1990)
- Rumpelstiltskin (1990)
- Who Killed Cock Robin (1991)
- Narcissus & Echo (1992)
- UBU: a play for children (1994)
- Ring Cycle! the Musical (1994)
- THE EIGHT: Reindeer Monologues (1994)
- Ubu Two: Ubu in America (1995)
- Elephans (1995)
- Larry and the Werewolf (1995)
- Dracula Rides Again (1995)
- Portrait of the Virgin Mary Feeding the Dinosaurs (1996)
- Lesbian's Last Pizza (1996)
- Princess Gray and the Black & White Knights (1996)
- In Real Life (1996)
- Ubu Three: Where's Ubu? (1997)
- The Death of Dick Piston (1998)
- Poona the Fuckdog and other plays for children (1999)
- Prague-nosis! (2001)
- The UnXmas Story (2001)
- Anger Box (2003)
- Don Quixote and the Black Knight (2003)
- Marley's Ghost (2003)
- Romeo & Julius [Caesar] (2004)
- Jolly Jack Junior: the Buccaneer's Bairn (2005)
- Your Swash Is Unbuckled (2007)
- Ham/thello (2007)
- Murder By Midnight (2007)
- Love Loves a Pornographer (2007)
- Seven Santas (2007)
- Lear's Labour's Lost (2008)
- Cosmetic Perjury (2008)
- Savin' Up for Saturday Night (2009)
- Yes, Svetlana, There is a Grandfather Frost (2009)
- Prosthesis: Murder! (2010)
- The Emancipation of Alabaster McGill (2011)
- Æsopera (2012)

=== Television ===
- Undressed (1999)
- Fast Food Films (1999)
- American Dragon: Jake Long (2005)
- Duck Dodgers (2005)
- Lalaloopsy (TV series) (2013)
- Tumble Leaf (2014)
- We're Lalaloopsy (2017)
- Molly of Denali (2020)
- Arthur (2021) Episode: The Pea and the Princess
- Thomas and Friends: All Engines Go! (2021)
