= Lalaloopsy (TV series) =

- Genre: Slice of life Animated series Comedy
- Based on: Lalaloopsy
- Developed by: Amandine Consorti
- Written by: Carin Greenberg Baker; Steven Darancette; Jeff Goode; David Grubstick; Kris Marvin Hughes; Kevin Monk; Gabe Pulliam; Joseph Purdy; Carla Robinson; Dean Stefan
- Directed by: Melissa Suber: Andrew Young
- Voices of: Greer Hunt; Emma Duke; Malia Ashley Kerr; Anna Quick; Tate McRae; Selia Sangra; Hayley Stone; Marissa Tawiah; Zoe Marlett; Calista Schmidt; Paige Stone; Jessica Hilbrecht; Andrew Hilbrecht; Keaton Whitbread
- Theme music composer: William Kevin Anderson
- Opening theme: "We're Lalaloopsy"
- Ending theme: "We're Lalaloopsy" (Instrumental)
- Composer: William Kevin Anderson
- Country of origin: United States
- Original language: English
- No. of seasons: 2
- No. of episodes: 52 (list of episodes)

Production
- Executive producer: Isaac Larian
- Producer: Patrick Inness: Kris Marvin Hughes
- Editors: Michael Bradley (video); Christopher Clark (sound); Steve Donmyer (animatic)
- Running time: 22 minutes
- Production companies: MGA Entertainment; MoonScoop Entertainment

Original release
- Network: Nickelodeon; Nick Jr. Channel
- Release: March 29, 2013 – September 14, 2015

Related
- We're Lalaloopsy

Lalaloopsy is an American animated children's television series based on the doll lineup of the same name by MGA Entertainment. The show first aired on March 29, 2013 at 1:30pm and 7:00pm. After the first few episodes were aired on Nickelodeon, it was moved to the Nick Jr. Channel. The series' last episode aired on September 14, 2015.

In December 2015, Viacom filed a lawsuit against MGA, stating that the toy company did not provide proper financing for the advertisement and production of the series. In September 2016, a judge awarded Viacom damages of over $14.9 million relating to the series. Soon afterward, the series was removed from Nick Jr.'s website.

== Plot ==
Lalaloopsy focuses on Lalaloopsy Land. Lalaloopsy Land is inhabited by colorful rag dolls, who came to life the moment their last stitch was sewn.

Each episode focuses on one or two groups of them facing a problem of their own, and them either solving it on their own or with incidental or previously planned help from the other group of dolls seen in the episode.

== Cast ==
- Selia Sangra as Jewel
- Tate McRae as Spot
- Hayley Stone as Bea
- Paige Stone as Mittens
- Emma Duke as Rosy
- Olivia Rose as Winter
- Greer Hunt as Marina, Little, and Haley
- Aurora Hunt as Pepper
- Andrew Hilbrecht as Patch
- Jessica Hilbrecht as Pickles, Dyna, and Suzette

== Episodes ==
Season	Episodes	Originally released	
Season	Episodes	First released	Last released
1	26	March 29, 2013	January 25, 2014
2	26	June 7, 2014	September 14, 2015

== Broadcast ==
In Canada, the series premiered on May 4, 2013 on Treehouse TV, and later moved to Family Jr. until August 28, 2016. In USA, the series premiered on March 29, 2013 and aired until October 2, 2016 on Nickelodeon and the Nick Jr. Channel.

== Spin-off ==
In 2017, Netflix released a follow-up Lalaloopsy animated series titled We're Lalaloopsy. The spinoff had a different art style from the previous series. However, it included some of the show's characters.

== Home media ==
The series was released on DVD in the United States by Paramount Home Entertainment.

== Lawsuit ==
On December 14, 2015, Viacom, owners of Nickelodeon, filed a breach of contract lawsuit against MGA in the United States District Court for the Central District of California. The action alleged that MGA had violated an October 9, 2012, co-financing agreement, where MGA had agreed to pay $9 million in funding the series over three installments from 2013 to 2015, with each payment being due on September 15; Viacom argued that it had fulfilled its part of the contract by paying the required $5.2 million of funding and airing the series on the mandatory "regularly scheduled basis." While the defendants had successfully managed to pay the first two installments by the deadlines, they had only managed to pay $500,000 for the third installment on November 23, 2015, over two months after the deadline, still owing the plaintiffs $3.5 million.

In response, MGA counter-sued Viacom on February 17, 2016, alleging that Viacom had failed to properly launch the series on the Nickelodeon channel, as well as neglecting to air new episodes of the series at regular intervals. MGA further alleged that Viacom had displayed a bias against them by promoting and airing their own original programming more than Lalaloopsy, arguing that this activity constituted a violation of the implied covenant of good faith and fair dealing. Viacom would also amend its own complaint with further allegations of non-payment from MGA, including the failure to reimburse almost $7.4 million of advertising costs for 2015, as well as failing to pay for advertisements of the Bratz toy line, also owned by MGA, that had aired between July 27 and August 17, 2015.

On September 22, 2016, Judge Manuel Real, who had presided over the case, ruled in favor of Viacom, ordering MGA to pay over $14.9 million in damages and legal fees while dismissing their counterclaims in their entirety, having stated in a July 18 order that MGA had failed to provide sufficient evidence in court to support them. Particularly, Real disputed MGA's claims of financial losses having resulted from the sporadic airing schedule of Lalaloopsy, as well as rejecting the notion that Viacom promoting other series more than Lalaloopsy was a breach of good faith due to the activity having never been covered by the contract.
