= American Dragon: Jake Long =

American animated television series

- Also known as: American Dragon
- Genre: Animated series; Comedy; Action-adventure; Superhero; Fantasy
- Created by: Jeff Goode
- Developed by: Eddie Guzelian; Matthew Negrete
- Directed by: Christian Roman (season 1); Steve Loter (season 2); Nick Filippi (season 2)
- Voices of: Dante Basco; Keone Young; John DiMaggio; Amy Bruckner; Kittie Kaboom; Charlie Finn; Mae Whitman; Jeff Bennett; Lauren Tom
- Opening theme: "The Chosen One" performed by; Mavin (season 1); Jonas Brothers (season 2)
- Ending theme: "The Chosen One" (instrumental) (season 1)
- Composers: Kat Green (season 1); Billy Lincoln (season 1); Adam Berry (season 2)
- Country of origin: United States
- Original language: English
- No. of seasons: 2
- No. of episodes: 52 (55 segments) (list of episodes)

Production
- Executive producers: Jeff Goode; Eddie Guzelian; Matt Negrete; Christian Roman (season 1)
- Editor: Dong Hun Oh
- Running time: 22 minutes
- Production company: Walt Disney Television Animation

Original release
- Network: Disney Channel
- Release: January 21, 2005 – September 1, 2007

American Dragon: Jake Long, or simply American Dragon, is an American animated television series. It was produced by Walt Disney Television Animation, created by Jeff Goode and co-developed by Eddie Guzelian and Matt Negrete. It premiered on Disney Channel on January 21, 2005, and ended on September 1, 2007. Fifty-two episodes were produced.

== Premise ==
The Huntsman and Huntsgirl in the second and final season

Set in the New York City borough of Manhattan, this animated series tells the story of a Chinese-American boy named Jake Long (voiced by Dante Basco), who must balance ordinary adolescence with the ability to change into a dragon. When he eventually unlocks his full potential and turns into the American Dragon, he has to overcome obstacles to protect the magical creatures living in the city. But as his ordinary self, Jake has issues with his deep crush on his schoolmate Rose (Mae Whitman) who, unbeknownst to Jake, has a dark, magical secret of her own: she is a natural dragon-slayer known as the Huntsgirl, a member of the Huntsclan, a cult of ninjas that slays mythical creatures and who Jake has fought consistently. The leader of the Huntsclan is the Huntsman (Jeff Bennett), who raised Rose.

Jake navigates the city with his two best friends – Trixie Carter (Miss Kittie) and Arthur P. "Spud" Spudinski (Charlie Finn). When Jake gets home, it is to an extended family who all live together: Jake, his sister, their parents, and Jake's maternal grandfather, Lao Shi (Keone Young). Jonathan (Jeff Bennett), a businessman dad originally from the Midwest, is unaware that he is married into a family of dragons from his Chinese wife, Susan (Lauren Tom), who lacks any dragon abilities, which skipped her generation. Lao Shi trains Jake in the magical, mystical ways of the dragons. Jake also cares very deeply for his annoying, overachieving, and seemingly perfect younger sister Haley (Amy Bruckner) (a nascent dragon), despite feeling like he is stuck in her small shadow. Grandpa's cynical sidekick, a magical talking Shar-Pei named Fu Dog (John DiMaggio), is Jake's animal guardian and his other best friend.

== Episodes ==
Season	Episodes	Originally released	
Season	Episodes	First released	Last released
1	21	January 21, 2005	January 29, 2006
Special		July 1, 2005	
2	31	June 10, 2006	September 1, 2007

== Characters ==
=== Main ===
- Jacob Luke "Jake" Long (voiced by Dante Basco): A Chinese-American 13-year-old (14 years old in the second season) and the eponymous American Dragon, a position that has him protect the magical world from harm. He is able to transform into a red dragon, an ability inherited from his mother's family. Jake is a cool, laid-back skateboarder who enjoys video games, extreme sports, and music. He has a crush on his schoolmate Rose until he learns that she is actually the Huntsgirl, assigned to hunt down magical creatures. Despite their respective groups being opposed to each other, Jake and Rose finally get together in the final episode.
- Luong Lao Shi (voiced by Keone Young): Jake's maternal grandfather, who was formerly the Chinese Dragon. He runs an electronic shop on Canal Street alongside Fu Dog. Lao Shi's dragon form is blue. In his youth in 1972, before his first encounter with the Dark Dragon, Lao Shi was known as Lucky Lao Shi.
- Fu Dog (voiced by John DiMaggio): A 600-year-old Shar-Pei who is Lao Shi's companion. Throughout his life, he and Yan Yan have fought over Fu's family amulet, causing disasters in the process.
- Arthur P. "Spud" Spudinski (voiced by Charlie Finn): Jake's best friend, who is extremely loyal and somewhat slow, but he comes up with intelligent things to say at random times. He is eventually revealed to be a secret genius in Season 2, but prefers not to show that side of himself since it reminds him of his father. In Season 2, he develops a crush on the head cheerleader, Stacey, who hates him until they start dating near the end of the season.
- Trixie Carter (voiced by Kittie Kaboom): Jake's other best friend, who is just as cool as he is. A witty, blunt, and sharp-tongued girl, a hardcore fashionista, but also the most logical and mature of the group.
- Haley Kay Long (voiced by Amy Bruckner): Jake's seven-year-old (eight in season 2), intelligent, talented, overachieving, but annoying little sister. She takes pride in her ability to expose all of Jake's secrets and highlight her own. However, Haley admires Jake's bravery, selflessness, and ability as the American Dragon and sees him as a role model. Similar to Jake, Haley inherited her family's transformation ability, allowing her to transform into a pink dragon.
- Susan Long (née Luong) (voiced by Lauren Tom): Jake and Haley's mother does not possess any natural dragon abilities like her family and children, having skipped her generation. However, she is aware of the magical world and keeps it secret from her husband Jonathan.
- Jonathan Long (voiced by Jeff Bennett): Jake and Haley's mortal father, and a businessman originally from the Midwest, who is unaware that he is married into a family of dragons. He learns of his family's secret in the series finale, but had suspected their magical nature before then.
- Rose/Huntsgirl (voiced by Mae Whitman): Rose is a member of the Huntsclan, a group that hunts magical creatures. She was born with a red birthmark on her arm resembling a Chinese dragon, leading the Huntsclan to kidnap her from her parents. She also has an identical twin sister whose fate is unknown.
- Professor Hans Rotwood (voiced by Paul Rugg): Jake's German schoolteacher, who has an obsessive interest in magical creatures. He intends to uncover the American Dragon's identity, oblivious to the fact that it is Jake. Rotwood styles himself as an expert on mythical creatures, but his knowledge is superficial.

=== Main villains ===
- The Huntsman (voiced by Jeff Bennett): The leader of the Huntsclan, a society of thieves that hunt and steal magical creatures for profit. They are highly trained and use sophisticated weapons. The Huntsman is #4 of the 13 threats to the magic community. In the second season, the Huntsman is killed by Rose.
- The Dark Dragon (voiced by Clancy Brown): The secondary main antagonist of the show. The Dark Dragon is a dragon who was consumed by dark magic. Considered the #1 threat to the magical world, the Dark Dragon hates all of humanity and intends to overthrow them.
- Bananas B (voiced by Dee Bradley Baker): A monkey with a rapper style and Jake's temporary animal guardian who later betrayed him to become Councilor Chang's assistant. He speaks with a British accent.
- Councilor Chang (voiced by Lauren Tom): A former member of the Dragon Council and the Dark Dragon's assistant who worked with Lao Shi when he first fought the Dark Dragon.
- Eli Excelsior Pandarus (voiced by Jonathan Freeman): A dark wizard who tries to be the world's most powerful sorcerer.

=== Recurring and guest ===
- Sun Park (voiced by Sandra Oh): Jake's home-ec schoolteacher, Haley's dragon mentor, and the former Korean Dragon.
- Nigel Thrall (voiced by Adam Wylie): An exchange student from England who hides his identity as a wizard. He shared a temporal rivalry with Jake when they both ran for school president, but ended up defeating Maximinus together.
- Fred Nerk (voiced by Adam Wylie): The Australian Dragon who is Jake's temporary rival at the Dragon Council Games until he saves him from the Dark Dragon.
- Jasmine (voiced by Lacey Chabert): Jake's first date, who turns out to be a soul-sucking creature called a Nix.
- Huntsboy #88 and Huntsboy #89 (voiced by Kyle Massey and Nicholas Brendon): Two of the Huntsman's new apprentices. 88 is as hip-hop and arrogant as Jake, which ironically shows Jake how annoying he can really be, while 89 is more of a nerd. Neither knows how to fight, and they were only accepted into the Huntsclan due to killing monsters in video games.
- Brad Morton (voiced by Matt Nolan): A 15-year-old jock bully at Jake's school who likes to make fun of him and frequently hits on Rose. He calls himself "The Bradster."
- Sigmund Brock (voiced by Corey Burton): Rotwood's former mentor who inspired him to research magical creatures. He is brought in to replace Rotwood as Principal of Fillmore Middle School when Jake gets Rotwood fired, but takes it upon himself to discover the dragon's identity, causing Rotwood to team up with Jake and get him fired.
- Stacey Wintergrin (voiced by Tara Strong): The school's cheerleader captain who is Spud's unrequited love interest until she eventually warms up to him.
- Kara and Sara Oracle (voiced by Tara Strong): The Oracle siblings are twin oracles. Kara is usually in a bad mood and can only predict good things. Sara is generally in a good mood and can only predict bad things.
- Veronica (voiced by Tara Strong): A half-human with eight spider legs who works at the Magus Bazaar.
- Bertha the Giant (voiced by Tara Strong): A dim-witted female giant with a stinky foot.
- Silver (voiced by Kari Wahlgren): A mermaid and medical science prodigy who is afraid of water.
- Ms. Dolores Derceto (voiced by Susanne Blakeslee): An undercover mermaid detective working as the principal of Jake's junior high who has a temporary romance with Lao Shi.
- Danika Hunnicutt (voiced by Jessica DiCicco): Jake's second love interest after Rose went to Hong Kong, and is the school's swim team captain.
- Hank Carter (voiced by Phil Morris): Trixie's father, who is a US Navy officer.
- Olivia Mears (voiced by Liliana Mumy): Haley's academic rival.
- Yan Yan (voiced by Tia Carrere): A Sphynx cat who has been fighting with Fu Dog over his family's amulet for centuries. She pretends to belong to a young girl called Olivia.
- Huntsgirl #18 (voiced by Tara Strong): A student at the Huntsclan Academy who develops a crush on an undercover Spud due to his in-depth knowledge about dragons and fights over him with another student.

== Voice cast ==
=== Main cast ===
- Dante Basco – Jake Long, Evil Jake
- Keone Young – Luong Lao Shi
- John DiMaggio – Fu Dog, additional voices
- Lauren Tom – Susan Long, Councilor Chang, additional voices
- Jeff Bennett – Jonathan Long, Councilor Kulde, Imp, The Huntsman, additional voices
- Miss Kittie – Shaniqua Chulavista, Trixie Carter, additional voices
- Amy Bruckner – Haley Long, Millie Fillmore
- Charlie Finn – Spud
- Mae Whitman – Rose

=== Additional voices ===
- Sandra Oh – Sun Park
- Paul Rugg – Professor Hans Rotwood, Triangle Boy
- Kyle Massey – Huntsboy #88
- Nicholas Brendon – Huntsboy #89
- Matt Nolan – Brad Morton
- Jonathan Freeman – Eli Excelsior Pandarus
- T'Keyah Crystal Keymáh – Mrs. Dorothy Carter, Mrs. Carter
- Tara Strong – Stacey Wintergrin, Kara Oracle, Sara Oracle, Veronica, Bertha the Giant
- Clancy Brown – The Dark Dragon
- Kari Wahlgren – Silver, Bride, Mermaid, Centaur, Wood Nymph
- Susanne Blakeslee – Ms. Dolores Derceto, Ms. Birch
- Clarence Williams III – Councilor Andam
- Jessica DiCicco – Danika Hunnicutt
- Adam Wylie – Nigel Thrall, Fred Nerk, Bananas B. Genius Nerdy Boy
- Macy Gray – Trixie's Grandmother and Miss Jenkins
- Monty Hall – Himself
- Edie McClurg – Tooth Fairy
- John C. McGinley – Dr. Diente
- Dee Bradley Baker – Leprechaun Brocamas, Pooka Pooka
- Hynden Walch – Euryale
- Mindy Sterling – Mrs. Grumplestock, Pix McGee
- Cathy Cavadini – Fury
- Diane Delano – Ophelia Ogelvy
- David Ogden Stiers – Narrator and Crewman #1
- Rob Paulsen – Groom, Head Counselor Jenkins
- Daryl Sabara – Hobie
- Liliana Mumy – Olivia Meers
- Tia Carrere – Yan Yan
- Paige Moss – Marnie Lockjelly
- Brenda Song – Tracey
- James Arnold Taylor – Sam Spark
- Grey DeLisle – Harpy, Ava The Love Lady
- Corey Burton – Sigmund Brock
- Kevin Michael Richardson – Santa Claus
- Rene Mujica – Kyle Wilkins
- Stephen Tobolowsky – Stan Lipkowski the Troll
- Wendie Malick – Aunt Patchouli
- Tress MacNeille – Queen Lilliana, Ms. Spudinski
- Melissa Greenspan – Genius girl
- Lacey Chabert – Jasmine
- Ron Masak as Marty
- Amy Hill - Aunt Cathy
- Will Friedle – Cousin Gregory "Greggy"
- Kay Panabaker – Lacey
- Laura Ortiz – Vickie
- Phil Morris – Hank Carter
- Candi Milo – Annika
- April Winchell – Rose's Mother
- Jennifer Hale – Stage Manager
- Nestor Carbonell – Cupid

== Production ==
American Dragon: Jake Long was created by Jeff Goode. The show was pitched to Disney Channel executives as an animated show in 2002. After being greenlit by Disney Channel, the pitch bible was then developed into its television adaptation with executive producers Matt Negrete and Eddie Guzelian, with Christian Roman serving as director. Dave Filoni was the storyboard artist for the pilot and drew the initial character designs.

Disney Channel ordered an initial twenty-one 30-minute episodes the first season. The series premiered on January 21, 2005. It was initially scheduled for the fall of 2004, but was moved to January when Brandy & Mr. Whiskers was completed in time for its September debut. It premiered in the UK a month early, on 19 December 2004.

The theme song was originally performed for the first season by the band Mavin.

In 2006, Disney Channel renewed the show for a second season. It had also been announced that Steve Loter, who had served as director of Kim Possible, would join the show for its second season as director and executive producer alongside Matt Negrete and Eddie Guzelian. However, following Disney Channel's renewal of Kim Possible for a fourth season, Loter would resume his role as the director but still serve as an executive producer of Jake Long. Nick Filippi, who had also done directorial work on Kim Possible, was assigned as the new director of Jake Long. With Steve Loter joining the staff, the show had all of its characters and backgrounds re-designed with new animation upon request by both Loter and the executives as they had disdain for the previous season's designs.

The theme song for season 2 was also re-recorded by The Jonas Brothers.

The show ended its run on September 1, 2007. After the show ended, reruns continued to air on Disney Channel's late-night lineup every night at 1:30am. The show was brought back to the daytime lineup weekdays at 2:00pm from October 1–5, 2007, and 1:00pm from October 9, 2007, to May 15, 2008. The show's late-night timeslot was moved to 2:30am on May 17, 2008, and to 3:00am on January 1, 2010. On May 7, 2010, the show started airing only 4 nights a week (Monday-Thursday), and the show was completely removed from Disney Channel after June 25, 2010. The series was syndicated to Toon Disney from February 20, 2006, to February 12, 2009, as well as its primetime Jetix block from 2007 to 2008. When Toon Disney was converted to Disney XD, the series was carried over and aired from February 14, 2009, to October 15, 2012.

=== Crossover with Lilo & Stitch ===
Jake Long and his allies come to Hawaii in an episode of Lilo & Stitch: The Series entitled "Morpholomew" to investigate one of Jumba's experiments, while Lilo enters a skateboarding competition in an attempt to impress her crush by winning a new skateboard for him while he is in Australia. Meanwhile, he and Stitch team up to stop Gantu and rescue the experiment.

== Other media ==
=== Video games ===
Two video games based on the show were produced, one for the Nintendo DS and one for the Game Boy Advance. Additionally, the characters of Jake Long and Rose were added to a Disney crossover MMORPG mobile game.

- Attack of the Dark Dragon (DS) — October 12, 2006
- Rise of the Huntsclan (GBA) — October 12, 2006
- Disney Heroes: Battle Mode (iOS & Android) — February 24, 2018

=== Books ===
Jeff Goode has written two books about American Dragon which were released in 2004, prior to the series' premiere.

- American Dragon Book 1: The Dragon Hunter, ISBN 0-7868-1926-X — April 1, 2004
- American Dragon Book 2: The Gnome Eater, ISBN 0-7868-1927-8 — May 1, 2004
