= Lalaloopsy =

Line of plastic rag dolls from MGA Entertainment

- Type: Rag doll
- Company: MGA Entertainment
- Country: United States
- Availability: 2010–2018; 2021–2022
- Slogan: Sew Magical! Sew Cute! (2010–2016, 2021–2022); The Magic of Creativity! (2017–2018)
- Official website

Lalaloopsy is a line of plastic rag dolls from MGA Entertainment. Originally released in 2010 as Bitty Buttons, the brand name was changed to Lalaloopsy shortly after launch. They began to grow in popularity during the holiday season in 2010. A variety of Lalaloopsy dolls have been released, as well as several Lalaloopsy themed video games. In November 2012 and February 2013, Lalaloopsy TV specials and TV series began airing on the Nick Jr. Channel and Netflix.

== History ==
On July 19, 2010, MGA Entertainment announced the launch of a line of doll toys, Bitty Buttons (created by Amandine Consorti), featuring eight 13-inch original rag dolls with the tag line "Sew magical! Sew cute!" Each doll character was created with a fictional theme, reflecting the day they were sewn on, the fabric they were sewn from, and their pet. Isaac Larian, CEO of MGA Entertainment, said, "Bitty Buttons was designed to teach kids that everybody is unique in their own special way. The new brand promotes the idea that old things can become new again, everything can be repurposed and nothing should ever go to waste". According to company press releases, the dolls were "designed to encourage a child's imagination and creativity" and "teach important life lessons such as diversity, individuality and the idea that everything deserves a second life". At release, the original eight dolls were Crumbs Sugar Cookie, Jewel Sparkles, Peanut Big Top, Bea Spells-a-Lot, Mittens Fluff 'N' Stuff, Dot Starlight, Pillow Featherbed, and Spot Splatter Splash.

Lalaloopsy dolls from 2010, from left to right: Pillow Featherbed, Spot Splatter Splash, Jewel Sparkles, Crumbs Sugar Cookie, Dot Starlight, Mittens Fluff 'N' Stuff, Bea Spells-A-Lot, Peanut Big Top

The dolls changed from "Bitty Buttons" to "Lalaloopsy" shortly after launch. In November 2010, the Lalaloopsy toy line won the "Large Doll" category in the People's Play Awards, and was featured the next day on the American television program Live with Regis and Kelly.

Lalaloopsy's original dolls were described by CBS's The Early Show in November 2010 as "the hottest toy of the season," and MSNBC referred to them as "this year’s Tickle Me Elmo". The New York Post described them as, "Creating Cabbage Patch-like hysteria among Holiday shoppers." On December 21, 2010, Lalaloopsy dolls were in the first spot on "Google’s Hottest Holiday Internet Searches." According to Google searches for Lalaloopsy dolls were "up 20% since the beginning of December."

On February 13, 2011, the addition of three new characters: Patch Treasurechest, Blossom Flowerpot, and Tippy Tumblelina were added to the existing line of 8. It was also announced that the company would be expanding the line of toys to include new mini versions of the dolls as well as made-for-DVD feature that has been released in spring 2012.

Additional mini-series were created as well as exclusive holiday-themed dolls that could only be found at certain retail stores. On June 28, 2011, three new characters: Marina Anchors, Sahara Mirage, and Misty Mysterious were added as well as additional play-sets. Development of a Nintendo DS title was also announced, with the official release date being November 6, 2011. Each game came with one of four mini dolls just to receive a less than stellar review on Metacritic.

On November 16, 2011, MGA announced that the newly created nurse doll - Rosy Bumps ‘N’ Bruises has been donated to more than 1,000 Red Cross hospital blood drives across the country to aid in awareness. The following day, MGA announced the creation of 5 webisodes to be featured on Teletoon, and that future updates would be posted on the Lalaloopsy Facebook wall.

In December 2011, MGA started to advertise Lalaloopsy Micro Figurines. Each one is about 3 centimetres (1.2 in) with a head that can be removed and placed onto the other bodies.

MGA continued to add additional characters to the Lalaloopsy toy line. As of September 2016, there are over 100 characters. The main toy line includes 13-inch dolls, the mini-series, and a variety of mini play-sets and plush dolls, as well as Lalaloopsy Littles, smaller siblings of the 13-inch dolls.

A spin-off known as "Lala-Oopsies" came out in late 2012. The short-lived line featured squishy princess and mermaid dolls made of foam, as well as plastic Mini Lala-Oopsies. In 2013, they received a direct to DVD movie titled Lala-Oopsies: A Sew Magical Tale. The line was discontinued that same year.

July 2015 saw the addition of a line called "Super Silly Party", featuring select classic characters with radically revamped looks.

The characters were revamped again, but this time the entire line was rebooted when the show We're Lalaloopsy premiered on Netflix in 2017.

The last release in the revamped line was Series 4 of the Mystery Minis, which were released in 2018.

In August 2021, new dolls were released to celebrate the line's 10th anniversary. Some dolls were rereleases of classic characters, while others were new additions to the toy line.

== Animated media ==
- Lalaloopsy Webisodes (2011–2015)
- Adventures in Lalaloopsy Land: The Search for Pillow (2012)
- Lalaloopsy (2013–2015)
- Lala-Oopsies: A Sew Magical Tale (2013)
- Lalaloopsy Ponies: The Big Show (2014)
- Lalaloopsy Babies: First Steps (2014)
- Lalaloopsy Girls: Welcome to L.A.L.A. Prep School (2014)
- Lalaloopsy: Festival of Sugary Sweets (2015)
- Lalaloopsy: Band Together (2015)
- We're Lalaloopsy (2017)

=== 2011-2012 ===
- Ava DeMary as Jewel
- Milena Elias-Reyes as Bea
- Sophia Roth as Pillow

=== 2013-2015 ===
- Hayley Stone as Bea
- Selia Sangra as Jewel
- Zoe Marlett as Pillow

=== 2014 ===
- Janice Kawaye as Bea
- Kira Buckland as Jewel

=== 2017 ===
- Kaylee Johnston as Singing Jewel
- Kazumi Evans as Jewel
