= Dyslexia in popular culture =

This is a list of artistic depictions of dyslexia.

== Books ==
=== Children's literature ===
- Maeve Kaplan-Taylor, one of the five main characters in the Beacon Street Girls series, is dyslexic.
- Hank Zipzer, the main character in the eponymous children's series by Henry Winkler and children's Lin Oliver is dyslexic.
- All of the demigods in the Percy Jackson & the Olympians and Heroes of Olympus series, including protagonist Percy Jackson, are dyslexic. This condition results from the demigods being attuned to reading ancient Greek rather than English.
- Reverend Robert Lee, the title character in Roald Dahl's children's story The Vicar of Nibbleswicke, has Back-to-Front Dyslexia, a fictional type of dyslexia that causes the subject to say the most important word in a sentence backwards, creating comedic situations.
- Mavis Elizabeth Betterly (May), the main character from Caroline Starr Rose's novel in verse May B, must leave school partly due to her dyslexia, which sets in motion the events of the story.
- Adam Hill, the main character of the short story "Moonies" from Undone! by Paul Jennings

=== Novels ===
- Maggie in Jennifer Weiner's novel, In Her Shoes (2002) is dyslexic. The novel was adapted to film (In Her Shoes) in 2005.
- Jackie Flowers, a detective and lawyer in a series of detective novels by mystery writer, Stephanie Kane, is dyslexic.
- Will Trent, who is a Georgia Bureau of Investigation detective in Karin Slaughter's novels, is dyslexic.
- Bascule the Teller, a character from Iain M Banks' novel Feersum Endjinn, is dyslexic. Bascule's portion of the story is narrated in a semi-phonetic spelling that non-dyslexic readers may find difficult to parse, perhaps yielding insight into a dyslexic's world.
- Stella Penn, character from Mark Peter Hughes' Lemonade Mouth, is revealed to be dyslexic at the end of the book.
- Wylan Van Eck, a character from the Six of Crows series by Leigh Bardugo, is dyslexic.
- Aiofe Riordan, a character from the novel Instructions for a Heatwave by Maggie O'Farrell, is severely dyslexic.

== Comic books ==
- Moose Mason in Archie Comics is dyslexic.
- Taki Matsuya, a mutant character from Marvel Comics, (1988–present), is dyslexic.
- Cassandra Cain, a character in DC Comics, was taught to read body language rather than written or spoken language, initially leaving her mute and illiterate until her brain was rewired.

== Film ==
=== Children's films ===
- 2007 Indian film, Taare Zameen Par, tells the story of Ishaan (Darsheel Safary) who struggles greatly in school until an art teacher (Aamir Khan) determines that he has dyslexia.
- 2010 American film, Percy Jackson & the Olympians: The Lightning Thief, Percy Jackson is dyslexic like his book counterpart.

=== General ===
- 1987 American film, Summer School: Denise Green (Kelly Jo Minter) A high school gym teacher is forced to teach a remedial English class during the summer.
- 1997 British film, Shooting Fish: Dylan (Dan Futterman) is a conman who attributes his lifestyle to his unemployable nature which he puts down to his dyslexia.
- 2000 British short film, Mical: Mike Jones (William Biletsky), a seven year old boy struggles is diagnosed with dyslexia.
- 2001 American film, Pearl Harbor: Captain Rafe McCawley (Ben Affleck)
- 2004 American independent film, Mean Creek tells the story of a group of boys who must contend with the school bully, a dyslexic boy named George (Josh Peck). Eventually, as George's mask disintegrates, he becomes the victim of the group.
- 2004 Canadian film, Wilby Wonderful: Duck MacDonald (Callum Keith Rennie)
- 2005 French film, La Cérémonie: Sophie (Sandrine Bonnaire)
- 2005 American film, In Her Shoes: Maggie (Cameron Diaz). It is based upon Jennifer Weiner's 2002 novel, In Her Shoes.
- 2006 British film, A Mind of Her Own tells the story of a dyslexic woman, Sophie (Nicky Talacko), who is determined to become a doctor.
- 2009 American film, Dislecksia: The Movie, a documentary film

== Made-for-television films ==
=== Children's films ===
- 1984 American ABC Afterschool Special, Backwards: The Riddle of Dyslexia tells the story of Brian (River Phoenix) who struggles in school until he is determined to be dyslexic.

=== General ===
- 1981 American television movie, The Princess and the Cabbie tells the story of a wealthy young woman, Joanna (Valerie Bertinelli), who is sheltered by her father until a cab driver realizes that she is dyslexic and tries to help her.
- 1985 American television movie, Love, Mary is based on the true story of Mary (Kristy McNichol) who is determined to be dyslexic by a counselor in an institution and eventually becomes a doctor.
- 1992 American television movie, The Secret tells the story of Mike (Kirk Douglas) who has hidden dyslexia his entire life until he realizes that his grandson Jesse faces the same difficulties.
- 1999 American television movie, Anya's Bell: Scott (Mason Gamble)
- 2020 British television movie, Small Axe: Education: Kingsley Smith (Kenyah Sandy)

== Television series ==
=== Children's shows ===
- 1996–2022 American animated television series, Arthur: George Lundgren
- 1998 Australian television series, Driven Crazy: Ned Bourke (Anthony Hammer)
- 2000-2004 American animated television series Static Shock: Rubberband Man (voiced by Kadeem Hardison)
- 2001–2015 Canadian television series, Degrassi: The Next Generation: The characters Joey Jeremiah and Anya MacPherson
- 2014–2016 British television series, Hank Zipzer: Hank Zipzer (Nick James), based on the children's literature book series Hank Zipzer by Henry Winkler and Lin Oliver.
- 2016-present American animated television series, The Loud House: Lola Loud
- 2018 Canadian television series, The Ponysitters Club: The Ponysitters Club (Skye).
- 2024-2025 American animated television series, Primos: Big Nacho and Nachito Ramirez

=== General ===
- 1984–1992 American television series, The Cosby Show: Theodore Huxtable (Malcolm-Jamal Warner)
- 1994–1995 American television series, My So Called Life: Jordan Catalano (Jared Leto)
- 1994–1996 American television series, seaQuest DSV: Seaman Anthony Piccolo (Michael DeLuise)
- 1990–2000 American television series, Beverly Hills, 90210: Donna Martin (Tori Spelling)
- 1991–1998 American television series, Step by Step: John Thomas "J.T." Lambert (Brandon Call) and Jean-Luc Rieupeyroux (Bronson Pinchot)
- 1999–2021 British soap opera, EastEnders: Liam Butcher (^{‡}) begins skipping school (2009), feigning illness and it is subsequently revealed that he is dyslexic, explaining his inferior grades and repeated absences.
- 2002–2007 American television series, George Lopez (TV series): Max. George Lopez (fictional character on the series) is portrayed as having dyslexia, which he inherited from his father George.
- 2005–present American television series, It's Always Sunny in Philadelphia: Charlie Kelly
- 2006–2010 American television series, Heroes: The telepathic character Matt Parkman (Greg Grunberg)
- 2004–present American television series, Grey's Anatomy: Cristina Yang (Sandra Oh)
- 2007–2010 Australian television series, The Librarians: Lachie Davis (Josh Lawson)
- 2010–2013 American television series, Shake It Up: CeCe Jones (Bella Thorne)
- 2009–2015 American television series, Glee: Ryder Lynn (Blake Jenner)
- 2010–2015 British television series, Downton Abbey: Andrew "Andy" Parker (Michael C. Fox) a footman who starts working at Downton Abbey in 1924. When he was at school he fooled around and never learned how to read or how to write anything but his own name.
- 2011–2019 American television series, Game of Thrones: Jaime Lannister (Nikolaj Coster-Waldau)
- 2013–2019 American television series, Orange Is the New Black: Tiffany Doggett (Taryn Manning). In Season 7 Episode 7: "Me As Well" Doggett is studying for the GED test and her teacher believes she has dyslexia.
- 2016–2019 British television series, Victoria: portrays Albert Edward, Prince of Wales (the future King Edward VII) (Mac Jackson in Series 2, Laurie Shepherd in Series 3) as dyslexic, being unable as a child to distinguish a "y" from an "sh" and perceiving the words to "swim" on the page. As dyslexia was unknown in the 1840s, other characters, including his father Albert, Prince Consort, attribute his difficulty reading to a lack of effort or intelligence.
- 2017–2021 American television series, Atypical: Evan Chapin (Graham Rogers), has dyslexia, why he is afraid of tests and didn't go to the ride along.
- 2017–present American television series, Star Trek: Discovery: Spock (Ethan Peck), mentioned in season 2 of the show as having L'tak Torai, "a spatial and order dysphasia, much like dyslexia."
- 2020–2023 Norwegian television series, Ragnarok: Magne Seier (David Stakston)
- 2023–present American television series, Will Trent: Will Trent (Ramón Rodríguez)
- 2021–present American television series, Abbott Elementary: Melissa Schemmenti (Lisa Ann Walter), mentioned in Season 2 Episode 11: "Read-A-Thon" Melissa, a teacher, admits to a 2nd grader struggling to read that she has the same struggles.
- 2022–present Italian television series, Di4ries: Giulio "Pac" Paccagnini (Liam Nicolosi)

^‡ – Liam Butcher portrayed by: Sonny Bottomley (1998–1999), Jack & Tom Godolphin (1999–2000), Gavin & Mitchell Vaughan (2002), Nathaniel Gleed (2002–2004), James Forde (2008–2015), Alfie Deegan (2021)
