= In Her Shoes =

In Her Shoes may refer to:

- In Her Shoes (novel), a 2002 novel by Jennifer Weiner
- In Her Shoes (film), a 2005 film starring Cameron Diaz, Toni Collette, Shirley MacLaine
