= Sonia Draga =

Polish publisher and businesswoman (born 1967)

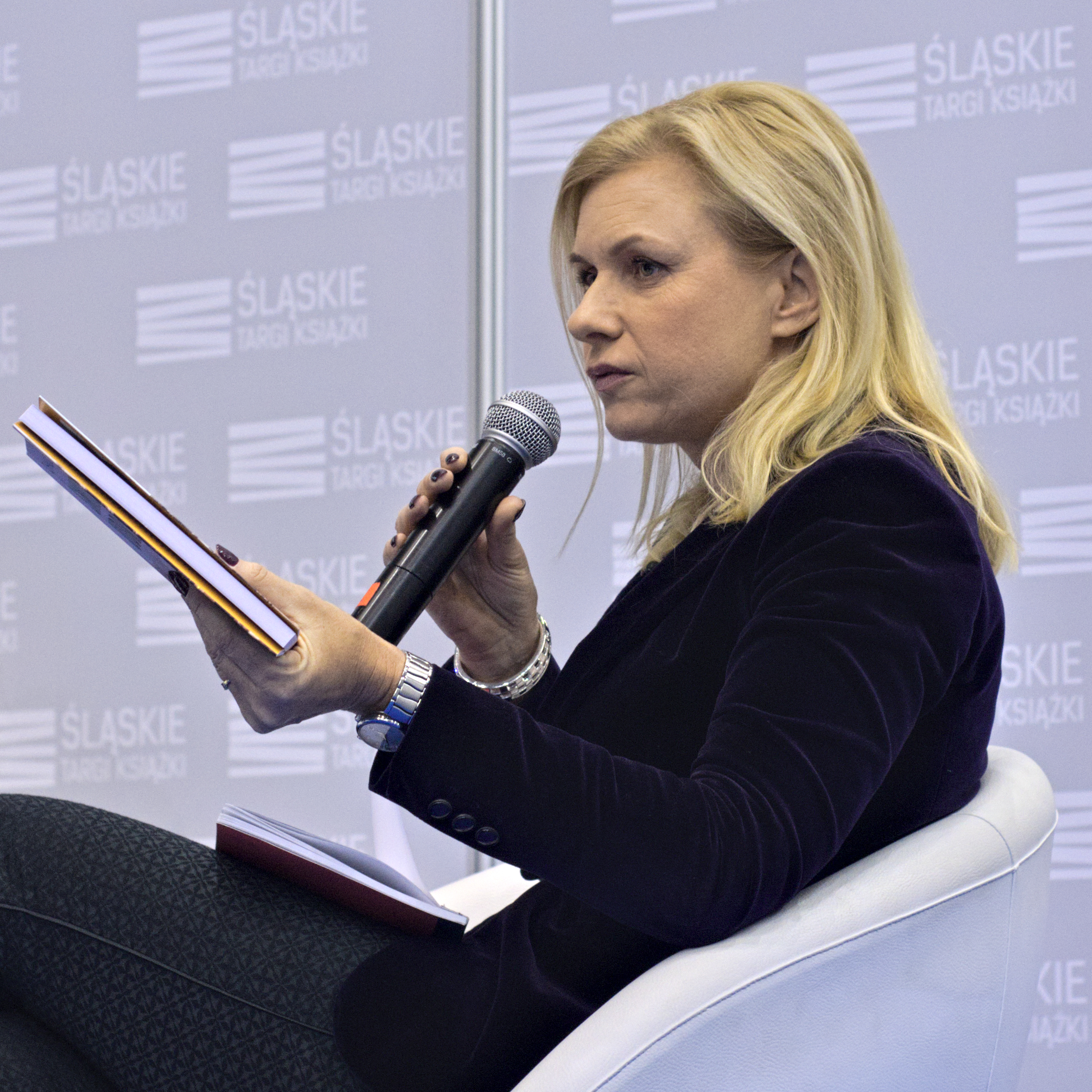
- Sonia Draga in 2019
- Born: Sonia Sabina Draga; 31 October 1967 (age 59); Katowice, Poland
- Education: Karol Adamiecki Academy of Economics in Katowice
- Occupations: Publisher, businesswoman
- Known for: Founder of the Sonia Draga Publishing Group
- Title: President of the Federation of European Publishers
- Term: 2024–present
- Children: 1
- Awards: Silver Cross of Merit (2000); Knight of the National Order of Merit (2015)

Sonia Sabina Draga (born 31 October 1967 in Katowice) is a Polish publisher, businesswoman, writer, and translator. She is the founder and editor-in-chief of the Sonia Draga Publishing Group. From 2020 to 2024 she was president of the Polish Chamber of Books, and since 2024 she has been president of the Federation of European Publishers.

== Early life and education ==
Born and brought up in Silesia, Draga graduated from the Karol Adamiecki Academy of Economics in Katowice (now the University of Economics in Katowice). She speaks several foreign languages, including English, French, Spanish, Swedish, and Italian. She has a son.

== Career ==
=== Publishing ===
In 2000, Draga founded the Sonia Draga Publishing House. For the previous ten years her company had dealt exclusively with the import and distribution of car audio equipment. The first book she published was Stereo w twoim samochodzie (Stereo in Your Car), which she translated herself. Later, her publishing house has brought out the works of Dan Brown, E. L. James, Jonathan Franzen, Elena Ferrante and other authors in Poland.

As of 2026, Sonia Draga Publishing Group also includes the Debit publishing house and the imprints Post Factum, Młody Book, and Non Stop Comics, as well as three own bookstores: in Warsaw, Katowice, and Chorzów.

For many years she was vice-president of the Regional Chamber of Commerce in Katowice, and since June 2016 she has been a member of the management board of Targi Książki Sp. z o.o., the company that organises events including the Warsaw Book Fair and the Silesian Book Fair. In 2013 she was named one of Poland's one hundred Ambassadors of Women's Entrepreneurship.

She hosted the programme Śląskie czyta (Silesia Reads) on TVP3 Katowice.

From 2020 to 2024, she served as president of the Polish Chamber of Books. On 5 November 2024, she was elected president of the Federation of European Publishers.

=== Photography and writing ===
In September 2007, she published Meksyk. Kraj kontrastów (Mexico: A Country of Contrasts), with her photographs and text by Łukasz Gołębiewski. In November 2009 she released a photo album of her own, Świat w moim obiektywie (The World Through My Lens), and in autumn 2010 her travel book RPA – kraj niespodzianek (South Africa: A Country of Surprises).

As a translator, she released Good in Bed by Jennifer Weiner, The Polar Express by Chris Van Allsburg, Mozart Finds A Melody by Stephen Constanza, and In the time of contagion by Paolo Giordano.

== Awards and recognitions ==
The Sonia Draga Publishing House was named Publisher of the Year 2012 by the Magazyn Literacki Książki.

Draga was awarded the Silver Cross of Merit in 2000 and was made a Knight of the National Order of Merit by the President of France.

In July 2015, she received the Honorary Badge for Merit to the Development of the Economy of the Republic of Poland.

In December 2019, she received the commemorative medal of the Polish Society of Book Publishers for her work for books and culture. In 2020 the magazine Home & Market named her one of the fifty most influential women in Poland.

In September 2026, Draga was awarded Cesare De Michelis International Publishing Award at the Frankfurt Book Fair.
