= Simsbury High School =

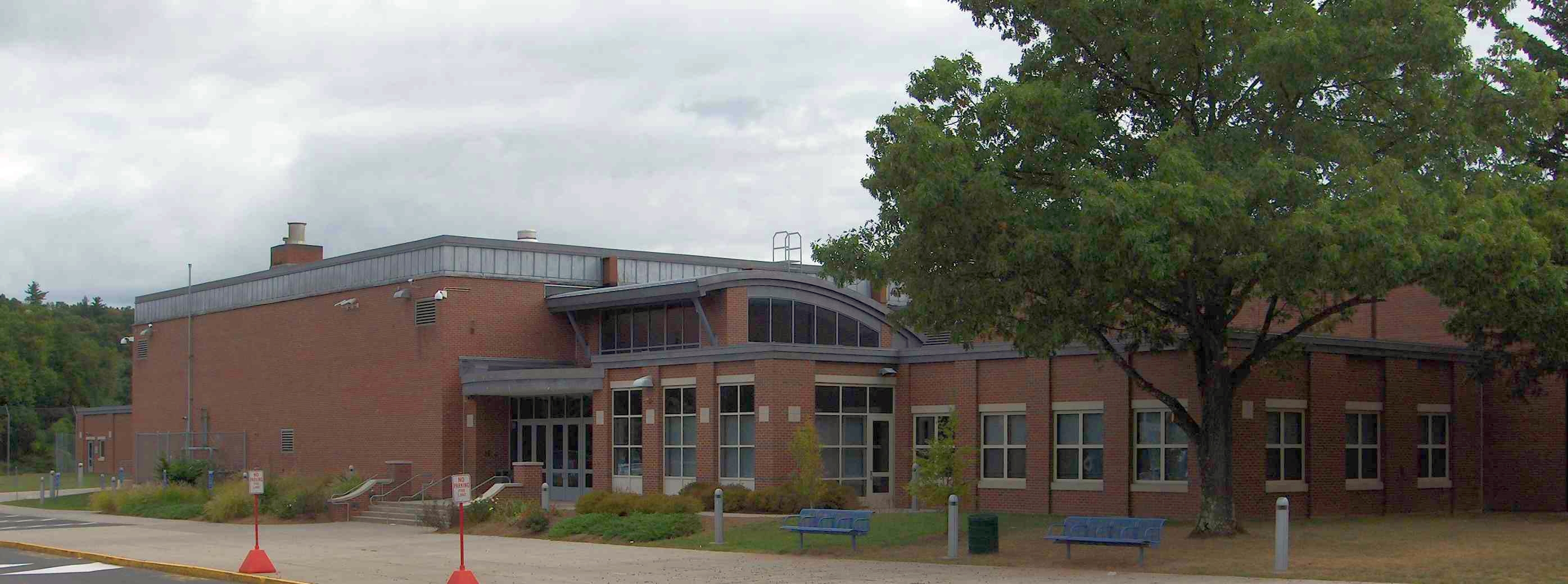

Location
- 34 Farms Village Road; Simsbury, Connecticut 06070; United States
- 41°52′14″N 72°49′17″W

Information
- Type: Public
- CEEB code: 070675
- Principal: Maggie Seidel
- Grades: 9–12
- Enrollment: 1,246 (2023-2024)
- Colors: Navy and gold
- Nickname: Trojans
- Newspaper: The Trojan Times
- Yearbook: Pinnacle
- Website: www.simsbury.k12.ct.us/schools/shs

Simsbury High School (SHS) is a public high school in Simsbury, Connecticut.

== Athletics ==
Simsbury has been honored multiple times with the Achievement Cup for outstanding achievement in athletics in the state of Connecticut.

Fall	Winter	Spring
Cheerleading	Basketball (Boys' and Girls')	Baseball
Crew (Boys' and Girls')	Cheerleading	Crew (Boys' and Girls')
Cross Country (Boys' and Girls')	Cross Country Skiing (Co-ed)	Golf (Boys' and Girls')
Field Hockey	Ice Hockey (Boys' and Girls')	Lacrosse (Boys' and Girls')
Football	Indoor Track & Field (Boys' and Girls')	Rugby (Boys' and Girls')
Soccer (Boys' and Girls')	Swim & Dive (Co-ed)	Softball
Volleyball (Girls')	Wrestling	Tennis (Boys' and Girls')
		Track & Field (Boys' and Girls')
		Volleyball (Boys')

=== Ice hockey ===
The Simsbury ice hockey team plays their home games out of the International Skating Center of Connecticut in Simsbury. The team was founded in 1973. The program has one Connecticut Division l state title (2002-2003).

=== Crew ===
The Crew program rows out of Paine Boathouse on the Farmington River. They won the New England Interscholastic Rowing Association girls' championship in 1980 and 1982.

== Notable alumni ==
- Rachel Sennott, actress and comedian, graduated in 2014.
- Tommy Cross, professional ice hockey player for the Boston Bruins, attended from 2004-2006.
- Justin Foley, drummer for metalcore band Killswitch Engage, graduated in 1994.
- Lisa Heller, singer-songwriter and pop musician, graduated in 2014.
- Sara Hendershot, member of 2012 United States Olympic Rowing Team (W2-), graduated in 2006.
- Ken Richters, stage actor, playwright, and voice actor, graduated in 1974.
- Maxim Naumov, figure skater, graduated in 2019.
- Franz von Holzhausen, designer of Tesla Model S and head designer at Tesla, Inc., graduated in 1986.
- Jennifer Weiner, author of Good in Bed and In Her Shoes, graduated in 1987.
- Patrick Tubach, visual effects supervisor at Industrial Light & Magic and nominated for Academy Award for Best Visual Effects, Graduated 1992
- Amira Elfeky, singer and songwriter
