= Richters =

Richters may refer to:

- Christine Richters (born 1966), an American model and Playboy Playmate of 1986
- Ferdinand Richters (1849–1914), a German zoologist
- Grigorij Richters (born 1987), a director, activist and producer
- Ken Richters (born 1955), an American stage actor, playwright and voice actor

See for other occurrences of the name Richters.
