= A Mind of Her Own =

- Directed by: Owen Carey Jones
- Written by: Owen Carey Jones
- Produced by: Owen Carey Jones
- Starring: Nicky Talacko
- Cinematography: Simon Dennis
- Edited by: Owen Carey Jones
- Music by: Alan Moore
- Distributed by: Carey Films
- Release date: 24 March 2005
- Running time: 93 minutes
- Country: United Kingdom
- Language: English

A Mind of Her Own is a British Drama film released in 2005. Based on a true story, the film was written, directed, and produced by Owen Carey Jones, and stars Nicky Talacko as Sophie, a girl trying to overcome the struggles of dyslexia, and Amanda Rawnsley as Becky, who is Sophies best friend.

== Plot ==
"A Mind of Her Own" tells the story of Sophie, a girl that aspires to go to medical school and become a doctor, but is obstructed by her severe dyslexia. She was discouraged by her parents who wanted her to pursue something less academic. But when encouraged by her closest friend Becky, Sophie finds the courage to put herself through college and university.

She is able to achieve a first-class degree in biomedical science and a PhD conducting research that leads to her achieving world wide recognition for helping to develop a cure for paralysis.

== Cast ==
- Nicky Talacko as Sophie
- Amanda Rawnsley as Becky
- Juliette Grassby as Jenny
- Hayley Taylor-Jones as Susie
- Gerard Logan as Harry
- Hayley Doyle as Carrie
- Nikki Helens as Kate
- Edmund Herd as the chairman
- Paul Hurstfield as the chemistry teacher
- Julian Kay as the teacher
- Mikey North as the boy in the club
- Tom Wontner as the Edinburg tutor

== Reviews and Ratings ==
According to the review aggregator IMDb, the film received 5.1/10 stars. With 130 ratings, 15.4% of reviewers gave the film 10/10 stars, but 18.5% of reviewers gave the film 1/10 stars. About 50% of reviewers rated the film above 5 stars, and the other 50% rated the film 5 stars or below.

On the website Amazon, where the film is available to rent or buy, it has a higher review of 4.2/5 stars, with 61% of reviewers rating the film 5/5 stars. The websites critics note, "Completely enjoyed watching this movie!", another, "It would not be possible to not love this movie".

== Awards ==
- 2005 Heartland Film Festival: Crystal Heart Award, Best Feature film; Best actress (Nicky Talacko)
- 2005 Monaco International Film Festival: Angel Award, Best Newcomer (Nicky Talacko); Best Supporting Actress (Amanda Rawnsley)

== Representation of dyslexia in popular culture ==
- The show Percy Jackson (based off the books and movie), the main character having dyslexia.
- Bella Thorne on her experience with dyslexia.
- List of artistic depictions of dyslexia

== Owen Carey Jones ==
Owen Carey Jones is the producer of "A Mind of Her Own" and established the production company, Carey Films. He became a film director/writer in 2000 at 45 years old, after a career in banking.

He was also the producer of "Rough cut"(2015), "The Spell"(2009), "Baby Blues"(2002), and "The Next Victim"(2003).
