= Lisa Heller =

American singer-songwriter and pop music artist

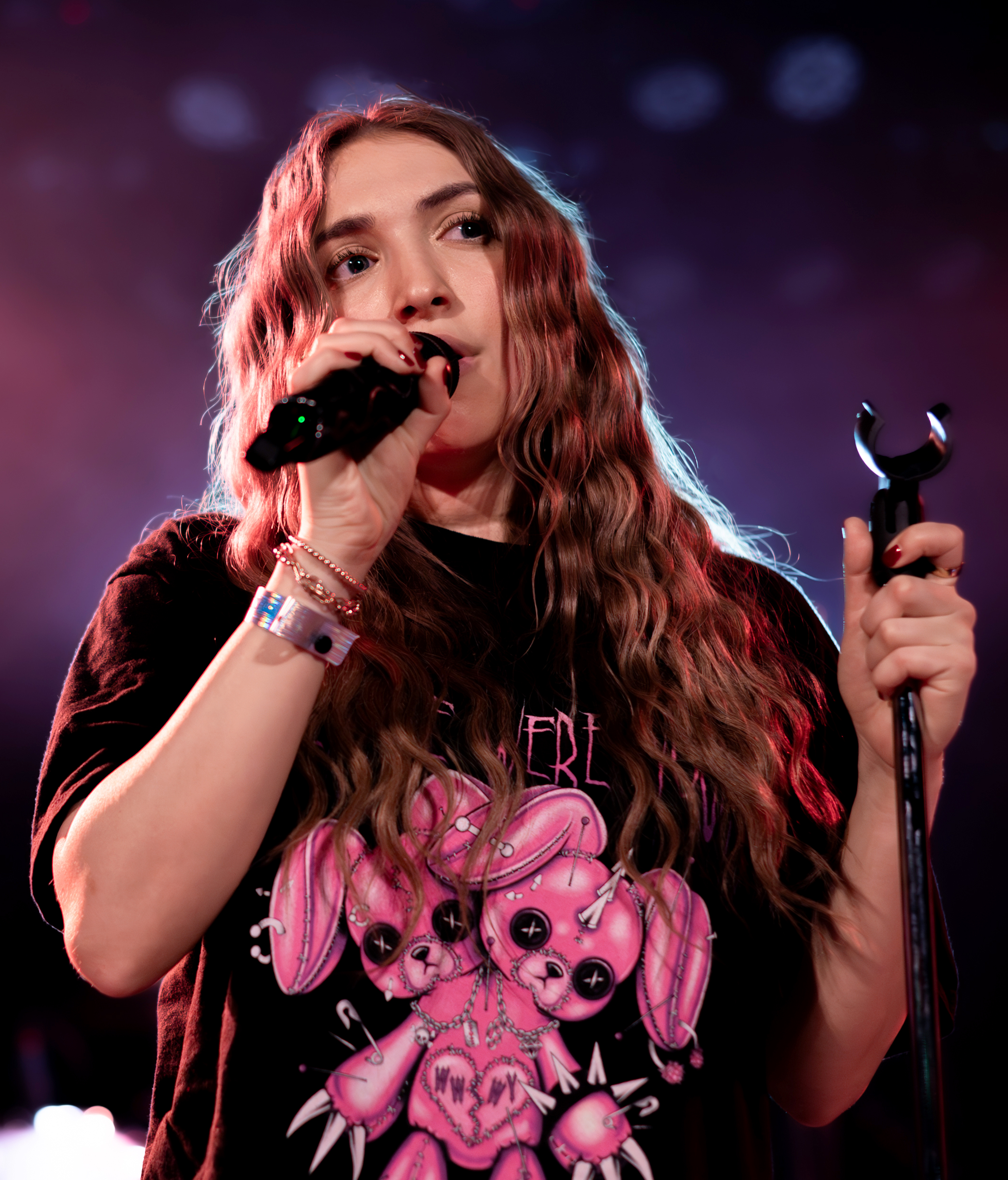
- Heller performing in 2024 at The Roxy

Background information
- Born: Lisa Jacqueline Heller
- Origin: Simsbury, Connecticut, U.S.
- Genres: Pop; Singer-songwriter
- Occupations: Musician; singer; songwriter; record producer
- Instruments: Vocals; piano; guitar
- Years active: 2016–present
- Labels: Unsigned; Raleigh Music Group
- Website: lisaheller.com

Lisa Jacqueline Heller is an American singer-songwriter and indie pop artist from Simsbury, Connecticut. She achieved global recognition in 2016 after the release of her song "Hope" and its video gained popularity in Australia, Canada, and most of Europe. Her EP Is Anyone Listening? has independently achieved millions of streams after its release in 2021. Heller has self-produced and self-published 4 EPs and numerous singles, and she has embarked on several nationwide and world tours.

== Early life ==
Lisa Jacqueline Heller is from Simsbury, Connecticut, the first daughter of Wendy (Loeb), from West Hartford, Connecticut and David Heller, from Westport, Connecticut. She has a sister, Nicole, and brother, William. As a child, Wendy enrolled Lisa in music classes, but she did not originally consider it to be a career path. Heller also began running due to her family's love of the sport. David runs triathlons, and Wendy ran cross-country at Colgate.

In high school, Heller was running in a race when her throat started closing up and she was unable to breathe. She ended up collapsing over the finish line and, though originally misdiagnosed as asthma, she was diagnosed with vocal cord dysfunction. Doctors recommended that she relax her vocal cords by humming or singing while running, which is how she discovered her love of singing. In the same year, her family was passed down an upright piano by Steinway and self-taught herself how to play and write songs.

Heller graduated from Simsbury High School, where she sang in school choirs and a cappella groups, and from Colgate University with a degree in psychology.

== Career ==
=== Early career ===
Heller began writing music at the age of 13 following her VCD diagnosis. Her first songs included "Close Your Eyes", which was a reaction to her own stress and the stress of her peers. "Close Your Eyes" was named a finalist in the Performance category at the 2014 American Songwriting Awards while another song, "Apocolypse" was nominated. Four of Heller's songs were nominated at the 2014 Songdoor International Songwriting Competition in the Pop category ("The Day We First Met", "Life on the Run", "Whispers", and "Wounded Soldier").

Heller continued to work on her songwriting and performance and had written several hundred songs by the middle of 2016. This included a collaboration with Jim McGorman, who co-wrote several songs with Heller. During this time, Heller began performing throughout Connecticut including opening for Rachel Platten at an 96.5 TIC FM Acoustic Cafe radio show and for American Authors at a similar radio-sponsored event. Heller was honored with the 2016 American Songwriting Award in the Teen category for "Life on the Run", while "Wounded Soldier" was nominated in the Performance category.

=== 2016–18: "Hope", the Hope Wall, and worldwide success ===
Heller planned for the release of her debut single, "Hope", in June 2016. "Hope" was co-written and produced by Jim McGorman at Sunset Sound Factory in Hollywood, California. After returning home, in the weeks leading up to her single, Lisa reached out to a few individuals going through particularly hard times in and around Connecticut. This led to the creation of the Hope Wall, on which people all over the world have submitted their stories of courage and bravery.

The release of "Hope" included a video where many people held up signs indicating what they were hoping for, such as a cure for cancer, a good life, and a world where all dogs have a home. The song and video achieved global success, trending in multiple countries including Canada, Australia, and much of Europe. The video for "Hope" has more than 1.6 million views on YouTube and trended to No. 1 in 7 different countries. Heller sang "Hope" to children with terminal illnesses in hospitals and homes, and a community connected surrounding the Hope Wall grew. Heller supported the release of "Hope" with a 4-month tour of Australia, where the song was popular. "Hope" was subsequently featured in the 2018 Lifetime TV movie The Perfect Mother.

In 2017, Heller released her follow-up single "Midnight", which caught the attention of online outlets such as HuffPost. "Midnight" was a continued collaboration with McGorman, and the song is about college hookup culture.

In late 2017 and into 2018, Heller was named as an ambassador for the #ICANHELP campaign and was invited to talk at the Nickelodeon HALO Awards and at Twitter Headquarters, where she spoke about the positive impact and leadership that she fostered online. Heller's "Light the Fire" supported the #ICANHELP project and was promoted by AWAL in numerous television campaigns including on E!, MTV, Netflix, Discovery, and A&E (though it is no longer available on music streaming services). Also in 2018, Heller performed at South by Southwest at the Saxon Pub and released another single, "Quicksand".

=== 2019–22: First EPs ===
Following this success and after graduating from Colgate, Heller moved to Los Angeles. Within a month, she was approached by a Nashville-based music manager who ran an independent label, Concept Haus, and for much of 2019, Heller worked under the label. The label pushed Heller to record electronic dance music and tried to re-image her in new makeup, clothes, and hairstyles. The song "Ghost" was released in early 2019, and dance remixes of it and "Hope" were released through the summer of 2019.

After Heller cut ties with the label, she returned to her piano and to singer-songwriting. With a renewed focus on her songwriting, Heller wrote the EP The Lisa Heller Project, which released in early 2020. In addition to three singles from her first EP, Heller released two more non-album tracks by the end of the year.

In 2021, Heller released her second EP, Is Anyone Listening?, and its six-tracks remain her largest album to date. In writing the album, Heller felt like she was questioning her own existence, particularly in light of her experiences during the COVID-19 pandemic. Heller rounded out 2021 by releasing three more new non-album tracks. In 2022, she released four new songs and opened for a USA tour co-headlined by Harbour and Wingtip.

=== 2023–25: More EPs, Touring ===
In 2023, Heller released two EPs, Sadie in April and Damage Control in August, and one new album track later in the year. She also supported Andi Mitchell's Rule Book Tour, Transviolet's Body the Tour, and Christian French's The Space Between Tour.

Lisa has also played shows with Yung Gravy, Coin, Hippo Campus, MisterWives, and Bryce Vine. Lisa opened for Chelsea Cutler, another Connecticut born and raised artist, at a sold-out show at Levitt Pavilion in Westport, CT.

In 2024, Heller released three new tracks. Heller also embarked on her first tour as direct support for a headlining act for Echosmith's Cool Kids: The Decade Tour.

In 2025, Heller released her single "People Pleaser" and its EP This Is the End. This is Heller's first collaboration with indie label Raleigh Music Group.

== Musical style and influences ==
Heller's first memories of music were listening to The Fray, Dave Matthews Band and Five for Fighting on family road trips. Heller first cited Christina Perri, Demi Lovato, and Rachel Platten as major influences on her songwriting and style. Heller has also cited Olivia Rodrigo and Chelsea Cutler as inspiration.

== Discography ==
=== Extended plays ===
Title	Details
The Lisa Heller Project	Released: April 17, 2020; Label: Lisa Heller Music; Format: Streaming
Is Anyone Listening?	Released: July 15, 2021; Label: Lisa Heller Music; Format: Streaming
Sadie	Released: April 7, 2023; Label: Lisa Heller Music; Format: Streaming
Damage Control	Released: August 25, 2023; Label: Lisa Heller Music; Format: Streaming
Hello, My Name Is	Released: April 3, 2025; Label: Lisa Heller Music, Raleigh Music Group; Format: Streaming

=== Singles ===
Single	Year	Album
"Hope"	2016	Non-album track
"Midnight"	2017	Non-album track
"Light the Fire"	2018	Non-album track
"Quicksand"	2018	Non-album track
"Ghost"	2019	Non-album track
"Figure It Out"	2020	The Lisa Heller Project
"Pulling Away"	2020	The Lisa Heller Project
"Closure"	2020	The Lisa Heller Project
"Wings"	2020	Non-album track
"I Feel Like I'm Going Crazy"	2020	Non-album track
"Red Flags"	2021	Is Anyone Listening?
"18"	2021	Is Anyone Listening?
"Pity Party"	2021	Is Anyone Listening?
"Fall for U"	2021	Non-album track
"Drive Me Home"	2021	Non-album track
"So Fixed"	2021	Non-album track
"Cheetos n Coke"	2022	Non-album track
"GDFL"	2022	Non-album track
"Shut Ur Mouth"	2022	Non-album track
"Blue"	2022	Non-album track
"Brown Paper Bag"	2023	Sadie
"You Were the Worst Part of My Life"	2023	Sadie
"Hollow"	2023	Sadie
"Downer"	2023	Damage Control
"Pretend"	2023	Damage Control
"Rock Bottom"	2023	Damage Control
"Come Back to Me"	2023	Non-album track
"Crushing on Straight Girls"	2024	Non-album track
"Loser!"	2024	Hello, My Name Is
"U Like That"	2024	Hello, My Name Is
"People Pleaser"	2025	Hello, My Name Is
"This Is the End"	2025	Hello, My Name Is

== Concert tours ==
=== Opening act ===
- Cool Kids: The Decade Tour (2024) (Echosmith)

=== Supporting act ===
- USA Tour (2022) (Harbour and Wingtip, co-headliners)
- Rule Book Tour (2023) (Andi Mitchell)
- Body the Tour (2023) (Transviolet)
- The Space Between Tour (2023) (Christian French)

== Filmography ==
=== Music videos ===
Title	Year	Director
"Hope"	2016	Kurt J. Zendzian
"Quicksand"	2018	Sean Boyd
"Ghost"	2019	Doltyn Snedden
"Figure It Out"	2020	Jamal Wade
"Pulling Away"	2020	Jamal Wade
"Pity Party"	2021	Charissa Clark, Cheska Zaide, and Lisa Heller

== Awards and nominations ==
Award	Year	Category	Nominated Work	Result	Ref
American Songwriting Awards	2014	Performance	"Apocalypse"	Nominated	
American Songwriting Awards	2014	Performance	"Close Your Eyes"	Finalist	
American Songwriting Awards	2016	Teen	"Life on the Run"	Won	
American Songwriting Awards	2016	Performance	"Wounded Soldier"	Nominated	
Songdoor International Songwriting Competition	2014	Pop	"The First Day We Met"	Nominated	
Songdoor International Songwriting Competition	2014	Pop	"Life on the Run"	Nominated	
Songdoor International Songwriting Competition	2014	Pop	"Whispers"	Nominated	
Songdoor International Songwriting Competition	2014	Pop	"Wounded Soldier"	Nominated	
