= Tommy Cross =

American ice hockey player (born 1989)

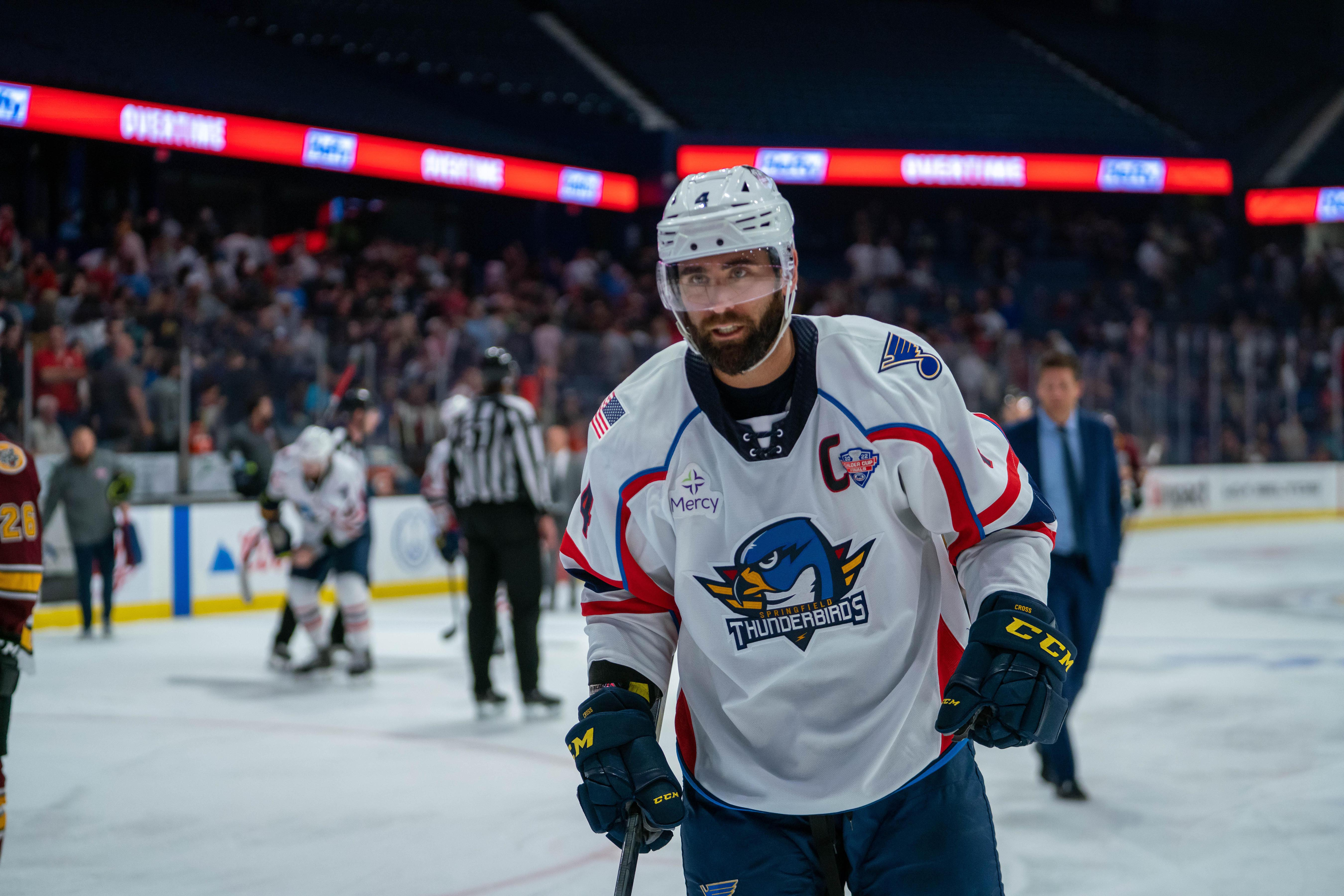
- Cross with the Springfield Thunderbirds in 2022
- Born: September 12, 1989 (age 36) Simsbury, Connecticut, U.S.
- Height: 6 ft 3 in (191 cm)
- Weight: 210 lb (95 kg; 15 st 0 lb)
- Position: Defense
- Shot: Left
- Played for: Boston Bruins
- NHL draft: 35th overall, 2007; Boston Bruins
- Playing career: 2012–2023

Thomas Reginald Cross (born September 12, 1989) is an American former professional ice hockey defenseman who played in the National Hockey League (NHL) with the Boston Bruins. Cross was selected by the Bruins in the second round (35th overall) of the 2007 NHL entry draft.

== Playing career ==
Cross played his first two years of high school hockey at his public Simsbury High School in Simsbury, Connecticut; garnering Connecticut player of the year honors his sophomore season. Cross was playing high school hockey when he was first originally drafted by the major junior club Moncton Wildcats of the Quebec Major Junior Hockey League, 252nd overall in the 2006 Entry Draft. With little intention to pursue a major junior career in Canada, Cross continued his development through prep (transferring to Westminster School in Simsbury, CT for his junior and senior seasons), and featured with the Ohio Junior Blue Jackets of the United States Hockey League to end the 2007–08 season. He committed to a collegiate career with Boston College of the Hockey East.

At the conclusion of his senior season culminating in captaining the Eagles to his second NCAA Championship, Cross was signed by the Bruins to a two-year entry-level contract on April 11, 2012. Cross immediately made his professional debut at the tail end of the 2011–12 season, with Boston's AHL affiliate, the Providence Bruins.

After two seasons with the P-Bruins, having solidified a position on the blueline, Cross was given a one-year extension with the Bruins on July 18, 2014. In the 2014–15 season, in his third full season in the AHL, Cross established career highs offensively with 4 goals and 18 assists for 22 points in 54 games.

Cross was announced as the Providence Bruins captain to begin the 2015–16 season. He featured in the opening two games with Providence before he received his first NHL recall by Boston on October 14, 2015. He made his long-awaited NHL debut with the Bruins, alongside teammate Tyler Randell in a 6–2 victory over the Colorado Avalanche on October 15, 2015. He later registered his first point, an assist, in his second career game against the Arizona Coyotes on October 17, 2015.

On June 14, 2017, the Bruins re-signed Cross to a one-year, two-way contract worth $650,000.

After six seasons within the Bruins organization, Cross left as a free agent to sign a one-year, two-way contract for $650k with $450k guaranteed with the Columbus Blue Jackets on July 1, 2018. In the 2018–19 season, Cross appeared in 73 regular season games with the Cleveland Monsters of the AHL, affiliate to the Blue Jackets, producing 34 points.

Cross left the Blue Jackets at the conclusion of his contract to sign a two-year, two-way contract as a free agent with the Florida Panthers on July 1, 2019. After spending the entirety his first season with the Panthers AHL affiliate, the Springfield Thunderbirds, Cross was penciled in to continue in Springfield before the Thunderbirds opted out of the shortened 2020–21 season. On February 25, 2021, Cross was assigned by the Panthers to reunite with former club the Providence Bruins for the remainder of the campaign. He posted 3 goals and 8 points in just 16 games.

Having concluded his contract with the Panthers, and opting to continue his tenure with the return of the Springfield Thunderbirds for the 2021–22 season, Cross was signed by new NHL parent affiliate, the St. Louis Blues, on a one-year, two-way contract on July 31, 2021. Cross as captain of the Thunderbirds, was an integral part of the blueline, collecting 8 goals and 29 points in 67 regular season games. He led the club in the post-season to the Calder Cup finals, contributing with 11 points in 18 contests.

On June 26, 2022, Cross opted to continue his tenure with the Thunderbirds, signing a one-year AHL contract. In the 2022–23 season, Cross was limited to just 18 regular season appearances, registering 4 assists. After being swept by the Hartford Wolfpack on April 21, 2023, Cross announced his retirement from professional hockey citing injuries.

== Career statistics ==
=== Regular season and playoffs ===
| | | | Regular season | | | | | Playoffs |
| Season | Team | League | GP | G | A | Pts | PIM | GP | G | A | Pts | PIM |
|---|---|---|---|---|---|---|---|---|---|---|---|---|
| 2004–05 | Simsbury High | USHS | 23 | 5 | 40 | 45 | 18 | — | — | — | — | — |
| 2005–06 | Simsbury High | USHS | 22 | 15 | 35 | 50 | 18 | — | — | — | — | — |
| 2006–07 | Westminster Prep | USHS | 25 | 8 | 12 | 20 | 20 | — | — | — | — | — |
| 2006–07 | U.S. National Development Team | NAHL | 2 | 0 | 2 | 2 | 0 | — | — | — | — | — |
| 2007–08 | Westminster Prep | USHS | 19 | 5 | 16 | 21 | 20 | — | — | — | — | — |
| 2007–08 | Ohio Junior Blue Jackets | USHL | 9 | 0 | 4 | 4 | 8 | — | — | — | — | — |
| 2008–09 | Boston College | HE | 24 | 0 | 8 | 8 | 24 | — | — | — | — | — |
| 2009–10 | Boston College | HE | 38 | 5 | 5 | 10 | 36 | — | — | — | — | — |
| 2010–11 | Boston College | HE | 28 | 7 | 11 | 18 | 45 | — | — | — | — | — |
| 2011–12 | Boston College | HE | 44 | 5 | 19 | 24 | 66 | — | — | — | — | — |
| 2011–12 | Providence Bruins | AHL | 2 | 0 | 0 | 0 | 2 | — | — | — | — | — |
| 2012–13 | South Carolina Stingrays | ECHL | 24 | 6 | 13 | 19 | 23 | — | — | — | — | — |
| 2012–13 | Providence Bruins | AHL | 42 | 1 | 10 | 11 | 23 | 12 | 0 | 3 | 3 | 8 |
| 2013–14 | Providence Bruins | AHL | 55 | 3 | 4 | 7 | 54 | 4 | 0 | 1 | 1 | 4 |
| 2014–15 | Providence Bruins | AHL | 54 | 4 | 18 | 22 | 85 | 4 | 1 | 0 | 1 | 4 |
| 2015–16 | Providence Bruins | AHL | 64 | 3 | 20 | 23 | 97 | 3 | 1 | 1 | 2 | 0 |
| 2015–16 | Boston Bruins | NHL | 3 | 0 | 1 | 1 | 0 | — | — | — | — | — |
| 2016–17 | Providence Bruins | AHL | 74 | 12 | 23 | 35 | 69 | 16 | 2 | 7 | 9 | 20 |
| 2016–17 | Boston Bruins | NHL | — | — | — | — | — | 1 | 0 | 1 | 1 | 0 |
| 2017–18 | Providence Bruins | AHL | 73 | 8 | 28 | 36 | 83 | 4 | 1 | 2 | 3 | 12 |
| 2018–19 | Cleveland Monsters | AHL | 73 | 7 | 27 | 34 | 71 | 8 | 1 | 2 | 3 | 6 |
| 2019–20 | Springfield Thunderbirds | AHL | 50 | 7 | 14 | 21 | 56 | — | — | — | — | — |
| 2020–21 | Providence Bruins | AHL | 16 | 3 | 5 | 8 | 10 | — | — | — | — | — |
| 2021–22 | Springfield Thunderbirds | AHL | 67 | 8 | 21 | 29 | 80 | 18 | 3 | 8 | 11 | 36 |
| 2022–23 | Springfield Thunderbirds | AHL | 18 | 0 | 4 | 4 | 16 | 1 | 0 | 0 | 0 | 0 |
| NHL totals | | | 3 | 0 | 1 | 1 | 0 | 1 | 0 | 1 | 1 | 0 |

=== International ===
| Year | Team | Event | Result | GP | G | A | Pts | PIM |
|---|---|---|---|---|---|---|---|---|
| 2007 | United States | U18 | 2nd place, silver medalist(s) | 7 | 0 | 1 | 1 | 4 |
| Junior totals | | | | 7 | 0 | 1 | 1 | 4 |
