= State of Georgia (TV series) =

American sitcom

- Genre: Sitcom
- Created by: Jeff Greenstein; Jennifer Weiner
- Starring: Raven-Symoné; Majandra Delfino; Loretta Devine
- Music by: Evan Frankfort; Marc Dauer; Liz Phair
- Country of origin: United States
- Original language: English
- No. of seasons: 1
- No. of episodes: 12

Production
- Executive producers: Kirk J. Rudell; Jennifer Weiner; Jeff Greenstein (pilot only)
- Producer: Kevin C. Slattery
- Camera setup: Multi-camera
- Running time: ≈ 23 min
- Production company: ABC Television Studios

Original release
- Network: ABC Family
- Release: June 29 – August 17, 2011

State of Georgia is an American television sitcom. It stars Raven-Symoné, Majandra Delfino, and Loretta Devine. The half-hour multi-cam comedy series stars Raven-Symoné as Georgia, an aspiring actress with a larger-than-life personality, and her science geek best friend, Jo (Majandra Delfino), who are trying to make professional and personal headway in New York City. The series ran on ABC Family from June 29 to August 17, 2011. The pilot episode had 1.32 million viewers.

On September 16, 2011, ABC Family canceled State of Georgia after one season, due to poor ratings.

== Premise ==
Georgia Chamberlain (Raven-Symoné) is an aspiring actress from the south who wants to become a household name, so she moves to New York City with her science geek best friend, Jo (Delfino). Georgia's Aunt Honey (Loretta Devine) is a wealthy woman with an active sex life who appears to give the girls advice.

== Cast and characters ==
- Raven-Symoné portrays Georgia Chamberlain, a bold and confident young woman from the South, who moved to New York to pursue her dream of becoming an actress.
- Majandra Delfino portrays Josephina "Jo" Pye, Georgia's shy and timid best friend. She moved to New York with her best friend Georgia and is a graduate student in physics.
- Loretta Devine portrays Honey Dupree, Georgia's nymphomaniac aunt who owns the apartment where the girls live. With an active life, she appears from time to time on their floor to give the girls advice and listen to their problems, and share her own adventures.
- Kevin Covais portrays Lewis, a member of Jo's grad student physics group. He doesn't accept that Jo is the leader of the group because she is a woman. He is the typical nerd who thinks he's cool and is always trying to be the leader. He has a not-so-secret crush on Jo, claiming, "I`ve always loved you!", in one episode.
- Hasan Minhaj portrays Seth, a member of Jo's grad student physics group. He is always the target of Leo's jokes and also thinks Jo is very attractive.
- Jason Rogel portrays Leo, a member of Jo's grad student physics group. He is fond of making jokes regarding Seth's intimacy.

== Development and production ==
The project is from ABC Studios. The pilot was written by the author Jennifer Weiner and Jeff Greenstein, and announced on October 8, 2010. After starring in the ABC Family original film Revenge of the Bridesmaids, Raven-Symoné went in to pitch the cable network a half-hour project with the writer Yvette Lee Bowser to star and produce a new series. The two sides were in negotiations when ABC Family managers brought up Georgia and on November 17, 2010, it was announced that she would star in Georgia. The series was originally called The Great State of Georgia. The pilot was filmed in late 2010. On January 31, 2011, it was announced that ABC Family had approved the series and twelve episodes (with the pilot) had been ordered.

== Episodes ==
No.	Title	Directed by	Written by	Original release date	Prod. code	U.S. viewers (millions)
1	"Pilot"	Ted Wass	Jeff Greenstein & Jennifer Weiner	June 29, 2011	1001	1.32
Georgia Chamberlain and her best friend Jo -- having just moved to New York City from Atlanta -- work together at the perfume counter at an upscale department store in the city. Georgia is desperate to leave her shift early in order to audition for the lead in a revival of the musical Damn Yankees. Always one to help a friend, Jo fakes a medical emergency as their way out of their work shift. While at the casting office, Georgia sings a phenomenal rendition of "Lola," but the casting director (Trent) informs Georgia she can never pass as a seductress due to her size. After a pep talk from her eccentric Aunt Honey, Georgia appears at Trent's apartment with an irresistible basket of food -- and proves to him that she is every bit the seductress. Later, back at work, Jo has a run-in with her professor, who happens to be making a return at the store. With a push from Georgia, Jo works up the nerve to ask the professor for a second interview for the Physics graduate program.
2	"Flavor of the Week"	Leonard R. Garner Jr.	Hayes Jackson	July 6, 2011	1004	0.81
Georgia begins dating Brad (Justin Bruening), the owner of the yogurt hut they discovered. Jo knows that Georgia loses interest in guys faster than you could finish eating a cup of yogurt. So Jo devises a plan to crack the hidden recipe to her favorite yogurt before Georgia can dump Brad, and they would stop visiting the yogurt because that would be too awkward for Georgia. In order to discover the secret recipe, Jo is forced to recruit help from her grad student physics group. When she discovers that the "nerdy" guys thinks she's the most beautiful girl they've ever seen, Jo leverages the reward of a kiss to pressure them to figure out the secret yogurt recipe. All hoping to win, the guys go to extreme lengths, including risking their health, in hopes of getting that kiss from the girl of their dreams.
3	"Best Friends For-Never"	Jeff Melman	Regina Y. Hicks	July 13, 2011	1006	0.65
After hearing about Aunt Honey and her long-lost best friend, Patrice (Jenifer Lewis), drifting apart, she thinks that she and Jo are drifting apart because of their different agendas. Meanwhile, Georgia reconnects Aunt Honey with Patrice, but finds out that they hate each other.
4	"The Mole"	Steve Zuckerman	Frank Pines	July 20, 2011	1007	0.79
Georgia’s new man, Brian, is perfect in every way – almost too perfect. Georgia begs Jo to find Brian on Facebook, convinced the social networking site will reveal at least some of his flaws. Unable to learn anything, Georgia begins to wonder if she finally found the guy of her dreams. Meanwhile, Aunt Honey believes that Jo’s math student, Mikey, is madly in love with Jo. When Mikey schedules a tutoring session for Saturday night, Jo is convinced that Aunt Honey was right. Although the evening doesn’t go quite as planned, Jo realizes that Mikey’s computer skills might come in handy in helping her investigate Brian. Abandoning all thoughts of tutoring, Jo and Mikey team up to learn the true identity of Georgia’s mysterious man.
5	"Know When to Fold 'Em"	Leonard R. Garner Jr.	Kirk J. Rudell	July 27, 2011	1002	0.55
Georgia tries to leave work so she can film her first commercial. Jo becomes attracted to a coworker named Doug (Nathan Parsons) who acts like a caveman.
6	"Mo' Honey, Mo' Problems"	Ted Wass	Benjamin Oren & Melissa Sadoff Oren	August 3, 2011	1009	0.70
Georgia and Jo find one of Aunt Honey's bank statements and find it only has 42 cents in it. Suddenly Georgia and Jo notice stupid spending Aunt Honey does. Aunt Honey is throwing a party and Georgia and Jo try to raise as much money as possible. It turns out Aunt Honey just transferred her money into a bank in Barbados so she won't have to pay taxes.
7	"There's a Place for Us"	Leonard R. Garner Jr.	Jennifer Weiner	August 3, 2011	1003	0.57
Georgia and Jo try to get into a private nightclub located in a dry cleaning establishment.
8	"R-E-S-P-E-C-T"	Ted Wass	Tricia Victoria Johnson	August 3, 2011	1010	0.69
Georgia puts on a showcase to try to catch some media attention, but Aunt Honey makes her feel like she's not good enough to put it on. Jo gets her hair straightened for the first time and gets a lot more attention.
9	"Foot in the Door"	Ted Wass	Greg Schaffer	August 3, 2011	1005	0.55
Aunt Honey helps Georgia get her first big break on a primetime television show but Georgia turns out to be an extra. While there Georgia ends up frustrating the director (Regan Burns) and the show's star (Garcelle Beauvais).
10	"The Popular Chicks"	Ted Wass	Annabel Oakes	August 10, 2011	1008	0.73
Georgia boasts to a rival about having good concert tickets to see Jason Derülo, but her bragging is based on a lie. So Georgia and Jo do all they can to get tickets.
11	"It's Not Easy Being Green"	Steve Zuckerman	Jennifer Weiner	August 17, 2011	1011	0.74
On the date, Georgia and Jo falsely inform the two farmers that they grow their own produce in their apartment and invite them to dinner. In order to keep up with their charade for a second date, Georgia and Jo plant different types of produce in the apartment as well as purchase a goat to make it seem like they make their own cheese – but can they keep it up, and are the two farmers worth all the effort?
12	"Locked Up, A Broad"	Steve Zuckerman	Kirk J. Rudell	August 17, 2011	1012	0.59
Georgia’s in trouble after defying Aunt Honey and borrowing one of her dresses to wear in an upcoming audition. As soon as Georgia puts on the dress, it gets caught in a desk chair. She enlists Jo to help, but with her clumsy ways, Jo only makes things worse. Realizing they cannot call Aunt Honey, the girls have no other choice but to call Lewis to their rescue.

== Home releases ==
While the series never received a DVD release, all episodes of State of Georgia are available on Apple TV and Prime Video, where each episode can be purchased separately or as the complete first season. The episodes "Pilot" and "Flavor of the Week" were available as a free download on iTunes on July 7, 2011.

== Awards and nominations ==
Awards and nominations for State of Georgia
Year	Result	Award	Category	Recipient(s)
2011	Nominated	Teen Choice Award	Choice Summer TV Star: Female	Raven-Symoné

== International broadcast ==
Country	Channel	Premiere
Netherlands	Disney Channel	Fall 2011
Belgium	Disney Channel	Fall 2011
South Africa	VUZU	November 15, 2011
Brazil	Sony Spin Brasil	March 6, 2012
Turkey	Show Plus	
France	Disney Channel	September 7, 2012
