= The Vicar of Nibbleswicke =

1991 children's book by Roald Dahl

- Front Cover
- Author: Roald Dahl
- Illustrator: Quentin Blake
- Language: English
- Genre: Children's novel
- Publisher: Century
- Publication date: February 1991
- Publication place: United Kingdom
- Media type: Print (Hardback & Paperback)
- Pages: 24
- ISBN: 0-7126-4991-3
- OCLC: 30564890

The Vicar of Nibbleswicke is a children's story written by Roald Dahl and illustrated by Quentin Blake. It was first published in 1991, after Dahl's death the previous year, by Century.

The protagonist is a dyslexic vicar, the Reverend Lee, who has a unique and amusing form of dyslexia which means that he pronounces words backwards, not realising that it is affecting his sermons. Waterstones called it "a comic tale in the best Dahl tradition of craziness".

Prior to the book, Dahl had been assisting with the British Dyslexia Association's Awareness Campaign. The Vicar of Nibbleswicke was written to benefit the Dyslexia Institute in London (now Dyslexia Action), with Dahl and Blake donating their rights.

== Summary ==
The Reverend Robert Lee, the new vicar of Nibbleswicke, had, with the help of teachers at the Dyslexia Institute in London, overcome his childhood issues with reading and had become a success in his school and seminary. However, now in his first parish, his nerves cause him to suffer from a rare and acutely embarrassing condition: Back-to-Front Dyslexia, a fictional type of dyslexia that causes the subject to say the most important word (often being the verb) in a sentence backwards, creating comedic situations. For example, instead of saying knits, he will say stink; God would be dog etc. It affects only his speech, and he doesn't realize he's doing it, but the parishioners of Nibbleswicke are shocked and confused by his seemingly inappropriate comments, especially the church's most generous benefactor, Miss Arabella Prewt, who does not take kindly to being called 'Miss Twerp'. However, thanks to the local doctor, a cure is found (walking backwards everywhere for the rest of his life), and the mild-mannered vicar can resume normal service.

The book contains a reference to Dahl's previous novel Esio Trot, noting that its title is tortoise backwards—the doctor who diagnoses the Reverend’s new dyslexia claims that it is very common among tortoises who call themselves esio trots.

== Editions ==
- ISBN 0-14-034891-3 (paperback, 2004)
- ISBN 0-14-036837-X (paperback, 1994)
