= Dislecksia: The Movie =

- Directed by: Harvey Hubbell V
- Written by: Eric Gardner; Harvey Hubbell V
- Produced by: Eric Gardner; Harvey Hubbell V
- Edited by: Eric Gardner
- Release date: 2012
- Running time: 83 minutes
- Country: United States
- Language: English

Dislecksia: The Movie is a documentary film. It was released in 2012 by Captured Time Productions, LLC, a production company based in Litchfield, Connecticut. Dislecksia is the company's seventh film. It is directed by Emmy Award-winning director Harvey Hubbell V, who is a dyslexic himself.

== Synopsis ==
Dislecksia traces the many trials Hubbell faced growing up as a dyslexic in the 1960s and '70s, with discussions on his school performance and how he was handled by teachers. It also examines the root causes of dyslexia and seeks to explain how a dyslexic brain differs from a normal brain. It discusses the prominence of reading difficulties throughout the nation and features a discussion of how educators can hope to improve the current situation.

The film features interviews with many prominent dyslexics, scientists and advocates, and examines the current scientific information coming out of Yale's Haskins Laboratories and Georgetown University's Center for the Study of Learning. It also explores schools that have been created specifically for children with dyslexia and other learning differences or disabilities, such as Litchfield's Forman School and New Jersey's Newgrange School. Hubbell has stated that he hopes the film will change laws and lives by improving common knowledge about dyslexia and changing its status in the United States.

== Reception ==
Director/Producer Harvey Hubbell V and Editor/Producer Eric Gardner were invited to attend the 2008 Sundance Independent Producers Conference, where they met with numerous producers and distributors to discuss the future of the film.

In the New York Times, Daniel Gold said: "The film’s primary mission is to destigmatize dyslexia, and it achieves that admirably, presenting technical material with a light touch and compassion." Odie Henderson on RogerEbert.com wrote: "Hubbell's documentary is ultimately far more successful as an educational tool than a feature film, but that's not a bad thing. It's refreshing to leave a movie theater smarter than when you entered it."

== Notable interview subjects ==
- Billy Blanks- Seven time World Karate Champion and creator of Tae Bo
- David Boies- Dyslexic and Chairman of Boies, Schiller and Flexner, LLP
- Stephen J. Cannell- Emmy Award-winning writer, producer, director, and actor
- Barbara Corcoran- Founder, The Corcoran Group
- Guinevere Eden- Associate Professor, Department of Pediatrics and Director of the Center for the Study of Learning, Georgetown University
- Diana Hanbury King- Founder of the Kildonan School
- Rob Langston- Author, motivational speaker
- Congressman Kendrick B. Meek- former Representative, 17th Congressional District of Florida
- Ken Pugh, PhD- Senior Scientist at Haskins Lab; Research Scientist, Dept. of Pediatrics, Yale University School of Medicine
- Sylvia O. Richardson, MD- Former President of the International Dyslexia Association; Former President of the American Speech-Language-Hearing Association; Professor Emeritus of Pediatrics and Distinguished Professor of Communications, University of South Florida
- Mark Seidenberg PhD- Director of the Language and Cognitive Neuroscience Lab in the Department of Psychology at the University of Wisconsin–Madison
- Gordon Sherman, PhD- Executive Director, New Grange School and Educational Outreach Center
- Thomas G. West- Dyslexic, author of In The Mind's Eye and Director of the Center for the Study of Dyslexia & Talent, Krasnow Institute for Advanced Study

== See also ==
- List of artistic depictions of dyslexia
