= Partners (1995 TV series) =

- Genre: Sitcom
- Created by: Jeff Greenstein; Jeff Strauss
- Written by: Adam Belanoff; Oliver Goldstick; Jeff Greenstein; Bernadette Luckett; Ari Posner; Eric Preven; Paul Redford; Jeff Strauss
- Directed by: James Burrows; Ellen Gittelsohn; Paul Lazarus; Max Tash
- Starring: Jon Cryer; Tate Donovan; Maria Pitillo; Catherine Lloyd Burns
- Composers: David A. King; Julie Ritter
- Country of origin: United States
- Original language: English
- No. of seasons: 1
- No. of episodes: 22

Production
- Executive producers: Jeff Greenstein; Jeff Strauss
- Producers: Adam Belanoff; Jay Kleckner
- Running time: 30 minutes
- Production companies: Jeff & Jeff Productions; Universal Television

Original release
- Network: Fox
- Release: September 11, 1995 – April 1, 1996

Partners is an American sitcom that aired on Fox from 1995 to 1996.

== Synopsis ==
Cast and Crew, Partners 1996

The series centers on a pair of young architects in San Francisco, Bob (Jon Cryer) and Owen (Tate Donovan), and Owen's fiancée Alicia (Maria Pitillo). Much of the show's humor derives from Bob's lack of success with women and his competition with Alicia for Owen's attention. The series was canceled after 22 episodes.

== Cast ==
=== Main cast ===
- Jon Cryer as Bob
- Tate Donovan as Owen
- Maria Pitillo as Alicia Sondergard
- Catherine Lloyd Burns as Heather Pond

=== Recurring cast ===
- Corinne Bohrer as Lolie
- James Cromwell as Mr. Saxonhouse
- Lawrence Pressman as Gordon

=== Guest stars ===
- Xander Berkeley as Christophe Nnngaarzh
- Ilana Levine as Loretta
- Joel Murray as Ron Wolfe
- Alex Rocco as Warren
- Eric Stoltz as Cameron
- Jennifer Aniston as CPA Suzanne, Bob's love interest
- Jason Bernard as Leavitt
- Mimi Rogers as Melissa, Bob's old babysitter
- Courtney Thorne-Smith as Danielle, Bob's love interest
- Lisa Edelstein as Cindy Wolfe
- Willie Garson as Larry
- Simon Templeman as Carl
- Thomas Haden Church as Ned Dorsey
- Debra Messing as Stacey Colbert
- Julie Cobb as Mrs. Blumenthal
- Susan Egan as Gina
- Kathy Griffin as Michelle
- Fred Stoller as Mickey

== Crossover ==
The ninth episode, "City Hall", crossed over with another Fox series, Ned and Stacey, when Debra Messing and Thomas Haden Church appeared as their characters in the episode.

== Episodes ==
No.	Title	Directed by	Written by	Original release date	Prod. code	Viewers (millions)
1	"Pilot"	James Burrows	Jeff Greenstein & Jeff Strauss	September 11, 1995	83588	11.2
Alicia's ready to tie the knot – around Bob's neck – for interfering in her romances with Owen and with their plans to pick a wedding date.
2	"A Dress?"	James Burrows	Oliver Goldstick	September 18, 1995	K0701	8.4
Bob gets a dressing down from Owen after he innocently buys Alicia a beautiful dress while on a shopping spree. After skirting the issue for a few days, Owen tries to one-up Bob by buying his fiancée a dress himself; but he doesn't have Bob's terrific taste.
3	"Who's Janet?"	James Burrows	Adam Belanoff	September 25, 1995	K0702	7.0
Owen trips down Memory Lane when his secret college crush comes to town; unfortunately, Bob tells tales out of school to Alicia – then falls for Janet himself.
4	"Primo?"	James Burrows	Maryanne Melloan Woods	October 2, 1995	K0703	7.5
Pressure from Alicia to plan their wedding has Owen neglecting his work and Bob – who, tired of catering to his partners' schedule, proposes changes in their work habits, such as not working together anymore.
5	"Why Are the Blummenthals Living in My House?"	Ellen Gittelsohn	Paul Redford	October 9, 1995	K0706	7.0
Alicia suspects Owen may be trying to pull the wool over her eyes when he acts sheepish about winning a BAAAA (Bay Area Architectural Association Award).
6	"Sexiversary"	Ellen Gittelsohn	Ari Posner & Eric Preven	October 16, 1995	K0704	7.1
To celebrate the anniversary of the first time they made love, Owen and Alicia plan a weekend getaway to the hotel where it happened, but their romantic trip hits a few roadblocks: their old room has not aged well.
7	"Who's Afraid of Ron and Cindy Wolfe?"	James Burrows	Adam Belanoff	October 23, 1995	K0708	7.1
Owen feels like he's been thrown to the wolves – or rather, to the Wolfe's – when Alicia's co-worker Cindy Wolfe (Lisa Edelstein) and her argumentative husband hire him and Bob to redesign their house.
8	"Who Are You Supposed to Be?"	Fred Savage	Bernadette Luckett	October 30, 1995	K0707	8.2
Owen and Alicia's plans for a romantic "anti-Halloween" are interrupted by relentless trick-or-treaters and Bob – who's bought an entire party with him.
9	"City Hall"	James Burrows	Oliver Goldstick	November 6, 1995	K0709	6.9
Owen learns he can't fight city hall after Alicia – shocked by her parents' announcement that they plan to divorce – demands he taker her there at once to get married. Notes: (This episode was crossed over with Ned & Stacey with actors Thomas Haden Church and Debra Messing playing their title characters from that show).
10	"How Long Does It Take to Cook a 22-Pound Turkey?"	Max Tash	Jeff Greenstein & Jeff Strauss	November 13, 1995	K0705	6.9
Owen can hardly mask his skepticism when his older brother Cameron (Eric Stoltz) pays him an unexpected visit and promises to make amends for a life straight out of pulp fiction; meanwhile, Bob dates Alicia's friend only to discover that they dislike each other on sight – and that she is his ex-girlfriend's therapist.
11	"Do We Have to Write You a Check?"	Max Tash	Bernadette Luckett	November 20, 1995	K0710	7.6
After jumping through hoops to fight the boys' club mentality at work, Alicia tries to beat her male colleagues at their own game by joining them at a sports bar. Meanwhile, Owen and Bob try to get their secretary a raise – and wind up paying for it themselves.
12	"Fourteen Minutes?"	Dennis Erdman	Maryanne Melloan Woods	November 27, 1995	K0711	7.0
Upon learning that his estranged father is making a Christmas Eve stop in San Francisco, Bob goes to great lengths to snow his dad into believing that his life is perfect. Unfortunately, the stop turns into a brief visit at the airport, giving Bob his 14-minutes of feign.
13	"The Year of Bob?"	Stan Daniels	Paul Redford	December 11, 1995	K0713	9.9
Bob's New Year's Eve date Danielle (Courtney Thorne-Smith) can't seem to forget an old acquaintance – namely, her ex-beau David – so he resolves to intoxicate her with his charms by throwing a party. Meanwhile, Heather's in for a big surprise: since New Year's is her birthday, she assumes the party is a surprise for her.
14	"Your Baby-sitter?"	Paul Lazarus	Ari Posner & Eric Preven	January 8, 1996	K0712	7.8
A potential caterer for Owen and Alicia's wedding turns out to be Bob's former babysitter, a beautiful woman on whom he had a major crush.
15	"How Was Your Date with Dad?"	James Burrows	Bernadette Luckett	January 15, 1996	K0714	8.3
Alicia is less than thrilled when her dad goes out on his first date following his divorce – with a younger cocktail waitress from a bar Owen and Bob took him to. Meanwhile, Bob tries to help Heather overcome her addiction to nasal spray.
16	"May I Call You Dick?"	James Burrows	Douglas Lieblein	February 5, 1996	K0715	8.0
It's a blueprint for disaster when Owen decks a rude contractor for making an off-color remark about Alicia. But Owen's guilt over the incident is offset by Bob's delight, improved productivity at the job site, and Alicia's reluctant sexual excitement at her fiancée's new-found machismo. Meanwhile, Heather falls for the hunk temporarily replacing the despised "sandwich lady", but can't get him to notice her.
17	"Follow the Clams?"	James Burrows	Jeff Greenstein & Jeff Strauss	February 12, 1996	K0716	8.8
As Valentine's Day nears, Bob's new love Suzanne (Jennifer Aniston), a CPA (Certified Public Accountant), fazes him with a request to shave off his goatee; the holiday finds Owen felled by the flu and falling down with exhaustion.
18	"Can We Keep Her, Dad?"	Jay Kleckner	Adam Belanoff	February 26, 1996	K0718	6.6
Alicia's dream of rolling in dough may need rethinking when she runs into her boss while returning the expensive pasta-maker he sent as a pre-wedding gift.
19	"Hello? Harmless?"	Paul Lazarus	Paul Redford	March 4, 1996	K0719	7.0
Owen, Alicia and Lolie are aghast when Bob leaves their engagement party for a sexual tryst with Alicia's friend Charlotte – who is herself getting married in a week – and Bob is infuriated by their assumption that he is to nice to go through with it. Trouble is, they're right; and after Lolie taunts him with the fact, it's they who tumble into bed together.
20	"Soup or a Movie?"	Max Tash	Ari Posner & Eric Preven	March 11, 1996	K0720	7.4
Owen and Alicia aren't happy that their best friends Bob and Lolie, will both be coming to the wedding without a partner. So they plot to set them up, respectively, with Diana, the wedding cake caterer, and Dr. Joe. Of course, they don't realize that Bob and Lolie are already sleeping with each other. At the cake testing, things don't go exactly to Owen and Alicia's plans, but at least Bob and Lolie's secret is still safe.
21	"You Quit?"	Max Tash	Oliver Goldstick	March 25, 1996	K0721	7.3
After Owen and Bob sign restaurateur Max Lobster to a lucrative contract, Leavitt takes the account away from them – so they quit, sending Owen into a depressing tailspin nine days before his wedding.
22	"Will You Marry Me?"	Paul Lazarus	Jeff Greenstein & Jeff Strauss	April 1, 1996	K0722	8.3
As their big day approaches, Alicia becomes obsessed with the superstition that Owen should not see her on her wedding day; and Bob surprises Lolie with a proposal, but is not prepared for her reaction.

== Awards and nominations ==
Association	Year	Category	Recipient	Result
Casting Society of America	1996	Best Casting for a Television – Comedy Pilot	Megan Branman	Nominated
