= Federation of European Publishers =

European association of book publishers

The Federation of European Publishers (FEP) is an independent, non-commercial umbrella association of book publishers associations in the European Union and Europe.

It is comprised 29 national book publishers' associations. It has pushed for stricter limits on how Google and other tech companies can use publishers’ online content.

The FEP Secretariat is located in Brussels, Belgium.

The book is the first cultural industry in Europe (EU and EEA) with an annual sales revenue of book publishers of approximately € 24.4 billion according to a survey conducted by FEP for the year 2013.

A total of about 585,000 new titles were issued by European publishers in 2013 and approximately 500,000 people are employed full time in the book value chain.

These figures show the importance of publishing industry in terms of innovation, growth and employment in Europe. The book industry is a key player in the knowledge society and economy and contributes actively to achieve the Lisbon Agenda goals.

== History ==
The Federation of European Publishers was founded in 1967.

FEP deals with European legislation and advises publishers' associations on copyright and other legislative issues.

Timeline:

1958

First consideration about monitoring European matters.

1967

GELC (Groupement des éditeurs de livres de la Communauté) founded by Belgian, French, Italian, Dutch and German Publishers Associations.

1973

British, Danish and Irish Publishers Associations join GELC as their countries become member of the European Community.

1981

Greek Publishers Association joins GELC as its country becomes member of the European Community.

1984

GELC secretariat is reorganised to give it a permanent representative with EC officials and directorate generals.

1986

Spanish and Portuguese Publishers Associations join GELC as their countries gain membership of the European Community.

1990

The Federation of European Publishers (FEP)/ la Fédération des Editeurs Européens (FEE) becomes the umbrella organisation representing European book publishers associations, Luxembourg Publishers Association joins FEP.

1992

Austrian and Finnish Publishers Associations join FEP. The Norwegian association also adheres, even though a referendum rejects Norwegian EC membership.

1996

FEP drafts new statutes designed to ensure that candidates associations from Central and Eastern Europe could become members.

1997

FEP 30th anniversary

2002

Hungarian, Cypriot, Czech and Slovenian Publishers Associations join FEP

2003

Lithuanian Publishers Association joins FEP

2004

Polish, Estonian and Icelandic Publishers Associations join FEP

2006

Bulgarian Publishers Association joins FEP

2007

FEP 40th anniversary

2011

Romanian Publishers Association joins FEP

2013

Serbian Publishers & Booksellers Association joins FEP

2014

Latvian Publishers Association joins FEP

2017

FEP 50th anniversary

2024

Montenegrin Publishers & Booksellers Association joins FEP

2025

Cyprus Publishers Association joins FEP

== Membership ==
The Federation of European Publishers has members from 31 national associations:

Austria: Hauptverband des österreichischen Buchhandels

Belgium (French): Association des Editeurs Belges

Belgium (Dutch): Vlaamse Uitgevers Vereniging (VUV)

Bulgaria: Bulgarian Book Association

Cyprus: Cyprus Publishers Association

Czech Republic: The Association of Czech Booksellers and Publishers

Denmark: Forlæggerforeningen

Estonia: Estonian Publishers' Association

Finland: Suomen Kustannusyhdistys

France: Syndicat national de l'édition

Germany: Börsenverein des Deutschen Buchhandels

Greece: Hellenic Federation Publishers and Booksellers

Hungary: Hungarian Publisher's and Bookseller's

Iceland: Icelandic Publishers Association

Ireland: Irish Book Publishers' Association

Italy: Associazione Italiana Editori

Latvia: Latvian Publishers' Association

Lithuania: Lithuanian Publishers association

Luxembourg: Fédération Luxembourgeoise des Editeurs

Montenegro: Association of Publishers and Booksellers of Montenegro

Netherlands: Nederlands Uitgeversverbond

Norway: Norwegian Publishers Association

Poland: Polish Chamber of Books

Portugal: Associação Portuguesa de Editores e Livreiros

Romania: Federation of Publishers in Romania

Serbia: Association of Publishers and Booksellers of Serbia

Slovakia: Association of Publishers and Booksellers of the Slovak Republic

Slovenia: Chamber of Commerce and Industry of Slovenia

Spain: Federación de Gremios de Editores de España

Sweden: Svenska Förläggareföreningen

United Kingdom: The Publishers' Association

== FEP Board - 2024-2026 mandate ==
Ms Sonia Draga, President

President of Sonia Draga Wydawnictwo (Poland)

Mr Phaedon Kidoniatis, Vice-President

Representative of the Cooperation of Greek Publishers’ Associations and Founder of the publishing house Eurasia Publications

Ms Renate Punka, Treasurer

Managing Director of the Latvian publishing house Jānis Roze

President of the Latvian Publishers Association

Ms Catherine Blanche, Board Member

Senior Counsellor International Policy at the French Publishers Association (SNE - Syndicat National de l’Edition)

Ms Barbara Budrich, Board Member

Director of the publishing house Verlag Barbara Budrich

Mr Jesper Monthán, Board Member

Director Nordic Business Development Bonnier Books

Chairman of the Board of the Swedish Publishers Association (Svenska Förläggareföreningen)

== List of FEP Presidents ==
1990-1992: President Alain Gründ

1992-1994: President Pere Vicens

1994-1996: President Volker Schwarz

1996-1998: President John Clement

1998-2000: President Ulrico Carlo Hoepli

2000-2002: President Michael Gill

2002-2004: President Anton Hilscher

2004-2006: President Arne Bach

2006-2008: President Jonas Modig

2008-2010: President Federico Motta

2010-2012: President Fergal Tobin

2012-2014: President Piotr Marciszuk

2014-2016: President Pierre Dutilleul

2016-2018: President Henrique Mota

2018-2020: Rudy Vanschoonbeek

2020- 2022: Peter Kraus vom Cleff

2022-2024: Ricardo Franco Levi

2024-ongoing: Sonia Draga

== See also ==
- International Publishers Association
