= Getting Personal =

- Created by: Jeff Greenstein; Jeff Strauss
- Starring: Vivica A. Fox; Duane Martin; Jon Cryer; Nancy Cassaro; Reggie Hayes; Elliott Gould
- Music by: Julie Ritter; David A. King
- Country of origin: United States
- Original language: English
- No. of seasons: 2
- No. of episodes: 17 (1 unaired)

Production
- Executive producers: James Lassiter; Benny Medina; Gina Rugolo-Judd; Marty Taylor; Alan Kirschenbaum
- Camera setup: Multi-camera
- Running time: 30 minutes
- Production companies: Jeff & Jeff Productions; Jeff Strauss Productions; More-Medavoy Productions; Handprint Entertainment; 20th Century Fox Television

Original release
- Network: Fox
- Release: April 6 – October 16, 1998

Getting Personal is an American sitcom created by Jeff Greenstein and Jeff Strauss, that aired on Fox from April 6 to October 16, 1998.

== Premise ==
A creative director at Old Dog Productions, an ad company in Chicago gets a new boss: the woman with whom he just had a disastrous date.

== Cast ==
- Vivica A. Fox as Robyn Buckley
- Duane Martin as Milo Doucette
- Jon Cryer as Sam Wagner
- Nancy Cassaro as Shelly Tucci
- Reggie Hayes as Leon Sykes Pettibone
- Elliott Gould as Jack Kacmarczyk

== Episodes ==
=== Season 1 (1998) ===
No. overall	No. in season	Title	Directed by	Written by	Original release date	Prod. code
1	1	"When Co-Workers Attack"	James Widdoes	Jeff Greenstein & Jeff Strauss	April 6, 1998	1ABR01
Milo is set up on a blind date with Robyn. The date doesn't go well, but the next day Milo finds out that Robyn is his new boss.
2	2	"Milo Does the Darndest Things"	Paul Lazarus	Greg Garcia	April 13, 1998	1ABR07
Milo dates a beautiful woman and her alleged twin, who are both auditioning for a commercial.
3	3	"Guess Who Else is Coming to Dinner?"	James Widdoes	Jay Dyer	April 20, 1998	1ABR04
Robyn finds out that her mother is dating her high school boyfriend.
4	4	"Sam I Am"	James Widdoes	Douglas Wyman	April 27, 1998	1ABR02
Robyn and Milo tries to keep Sam from finding out which guy in the office her friend really likes.
5	5	"My Best Fling's Wedding"	James Widdoes	Karen McCullah-Lutz & Kirsten Smith	May 4, 1998	1ABR06
Milo finds out that his former girlfriend is getting married.
6	6	"Raiders of the Lost Watch"	Ellen Gittelsohn	Douglas Lieblein	May 11, 1998	1ABR05
Milo helps Sam get Sam's uncle's watch back from a crazy ex-girlfriend.
7	7	"Chasing Sammy"	Mark Cendrowski	Greg Garcia & Kriss Turner	May 18, 1998	1ABR10
Milo pretends that he is gay in order to win a potential client. Robyn tries to impress an old girlfriend by pretending that Sam is her rich fiancee.
8	8	"The No Joy Bad Luck Club"	James Widdoes	Gina Fattore	July 31, 1998	1ABR03
Sam tries to end his losing streak at an awards ceremony. Jack receives a lifetime achievement award, while Robyn reflects on her lack of life experiences.
9	9	"Bring in Da Milo, Bring in Da Robyn"	Sheldon Epps	Gina Fattore	August 7, 1998	1ABR09
Sam directs a commercial based on the disastrous date between Robyn and Milo. Robyn starts dating the "fake Milo".
10	10	"The Date After"	Paul Lazarus	Karen McCullah Lutz & Kirsten Smith	August 14, 1998	1ABR08
Milo and Robyn go out with different partners to the same restaurant where they had their disastrous date. Sam wants more money from Jack.

=== Season 2 (1998) ===
No. overall	No. in season	Title	Directed by	Written by	Original release date	Prod. code
11	1	"Fix Me Up, Tie Me Down"	Mark Cendrowski	Greg Garcia	September 11, 1998	2ABR01
The gang sets each other up on dates.
12	2	"The Doctor Is In"	Mark Cendrowski	Jay Dyer	September 18, 1998	2ABR02
Milo has a crush on a psychologist in the building where he works. Robyn teaches Jack linedancing for his daughter's birthday party.
13	3	"There's Something About Rhonda"	Peter Bonerz	Karen McCullah Lutz & Kirsten Smith	September 25, 1998	2ABR03
Robyn finds out that her ex-boyfriend's new sitcom is inspired by her.
14	4	"The Wedding Zinger"	Mark Cendrowski	Douglas Lieblein	October 2, 1998	2ABR04
Robyn gets an invitation to a bridal shower for an old rival.
15	5	"Midnight Milo"	Mark Cendrowski	Kriss Turner	October 9, 1998	2ABR05
The gang goes on a business trip to San Francisco.
16	6	"Saving Milo's Privates"	Mark Cendrowski	Alan Kirschenbaum	October 16, 1998	2ABR07
Milo ends up in the bedroom with Robyn's roommate.
17	7	"The Last Three Temptations of Robyn Buckley"	Mark Cendrowski	Gina Fattore	unaired	2ABR06
Robyn is told that the right man for her is nearby, so she starts fantasizing about the men in her office.
