= Ken Richters =

American actor (born 1955)

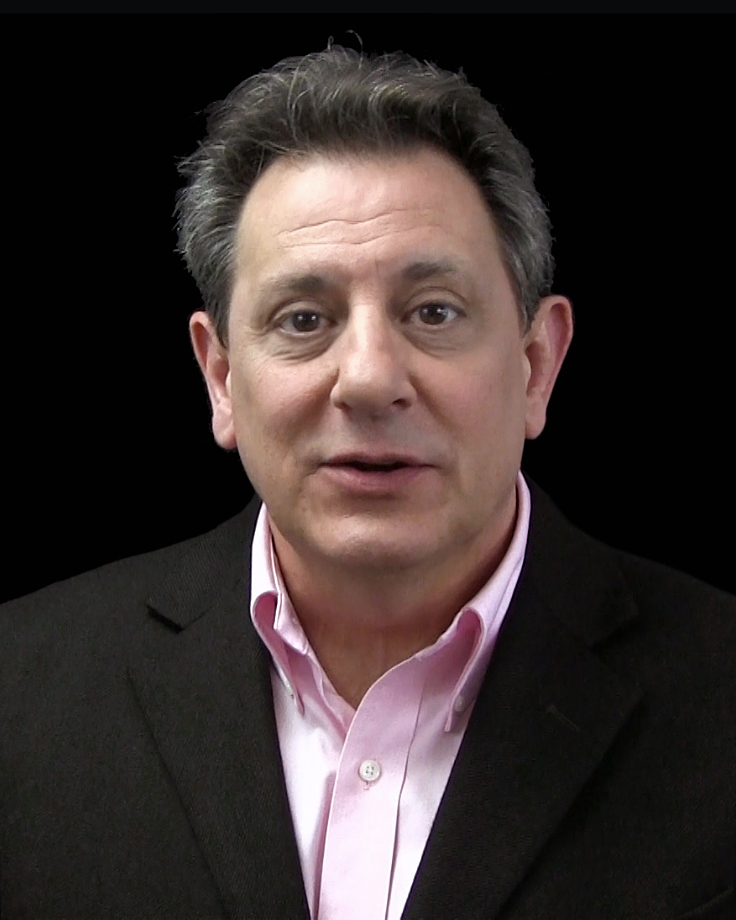
- Born: July 22, 1955 (age 71); Hartford, Connecticut
- Occupations: Stage Actor; Playwright; Voice Actor
- Known for: Mark Twain On Tour
- Website: www.kenrichters.com

Ken Richters (born July 22, 1955) is an American stage actor, playwright, and voice actor. He is best known for his performances of Mark Twain starring in the one-man theatrical production of Mark Twain On Tour which he has performed since 1981. He has also established a busy career doing commercial voiceovers, and singing in musical theater across the United States.

== Early life ==
Born Kenneth Leo Richters on July 22, 1955, in Hartford, Connecticut, attending Simsbury High School in Simsbury, Connecticut, where he was junior and senior class president, and graduated from the school in 1974. His love for stage performing began when he was in fifth grade and attended an opera at the Bushnell Center for the Performing Arts. It was at that time that Richters stated he felt like he was looking in the wrong direction sitting in the audience, and should be standing on the stage looking at the audience, rather than watching others perform. The summer after graduating eighth grade, he began acting in community theatre.

After high school graduation, Richters took a $100 a week job as a disc jockey with a radio station in White River Junction, Vermont. After a short stay in Vermont, he worked as a television booth announcer at WHYN-TV (now WGGB-TV), and radio stations in Springfield, Massachusetts; Hartford and Bridgeport, Connecticut; before landing a job as a back-up disc jockey at the flagship station of the NBC Red Network, WNBC (AM) in New York City. From New York he moved to Los Angeles where he played minor roles in television shows and commercials, before returning to Connecticut and performing as Mark Twain.

== Career ==
Richters' first began performing in the early 1970s as a singer and featured dancer with various regional theaters in the New England area. Since then he has worked extensively in the theater, appearing in such live stage productions as Big River, Oklahoma, They're Playing Our Song, Promises Promises, Company, Man of La Mancha, George M!, and The Man Who Came to Dinner. He made his operatic debut in Connecticut Opera’s production of Die Fledermaus, playing the role of Frosch the Jailer to great notices: “Veteran character actor Ken Richters’ mastery of physical comedy as Frosch the boozy jailer nearly stole Act III out from under the singers. His hilarious slapstick drunkenness might have been coached at the quaking knees of the late Foster Brooks.” He collaborated with the production team of Gerald Goehring and Douglas C. Evans (Off-Broadway’s Frankenstein, The Musical and Raisin’ Cane) starring in the theatrical tour de force Dead Man Talking

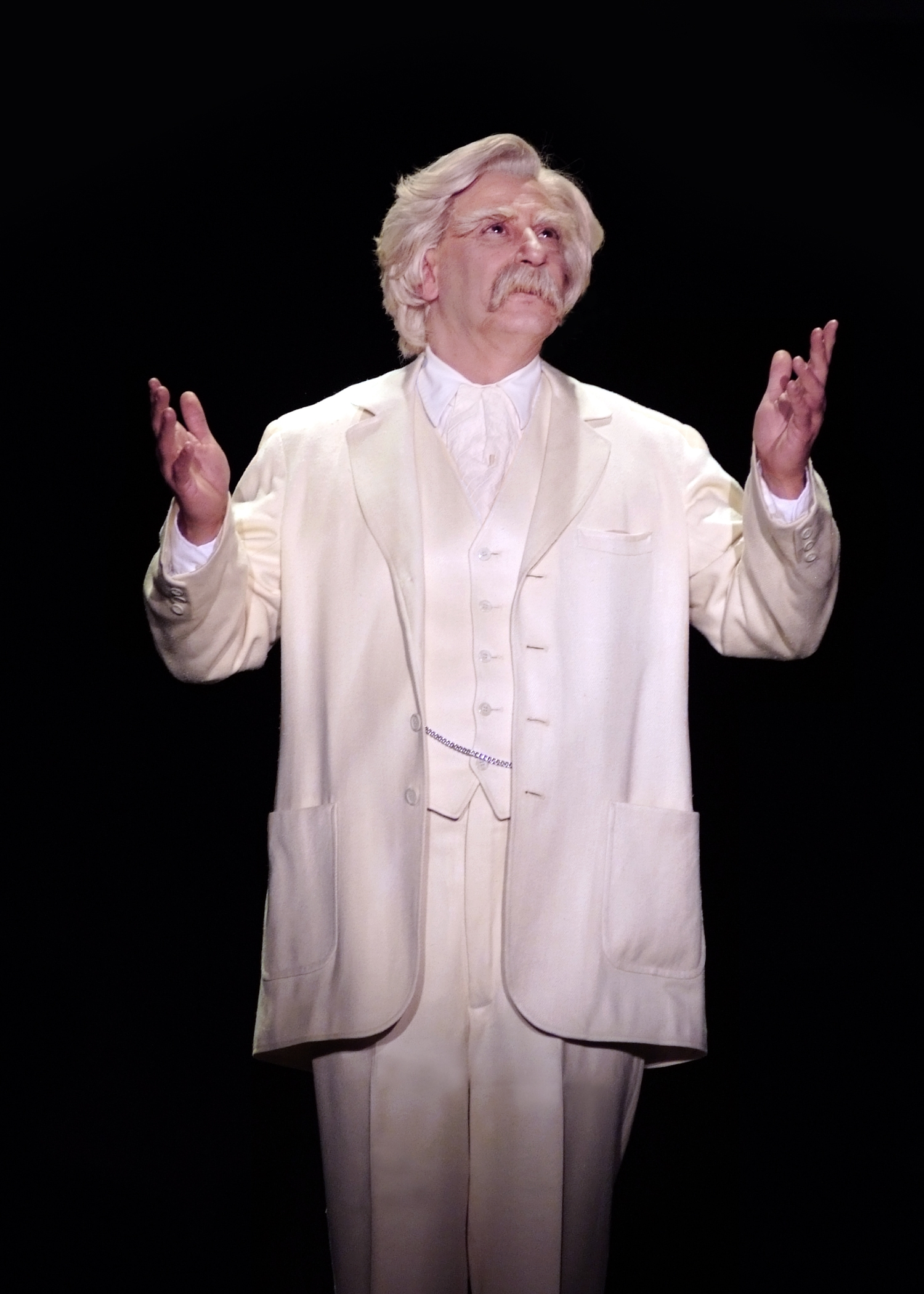
Ken Richters in full Mark Twain.

Referred to as the “Man of 1,000 Voice-overs” by the press, he has a long list of commercial and corporate voice-over clients including, Domino's Pizza, Bias Primary Surgical, and Pratt & Whitney. Richters also appears as the opening act for other performers, including The Temptations, and does private coaching and consultation with corporate executives, politicians, and authors, assisting them with their public speaking. His film credits include starring in independent short The Death of Jean produced by Tom Fontana.

Richters’ performances as Mark Twain were first recognized nationally in 1981 during a performance to members of the U.S. Congress in Washington, D.C., when the sold-out event was reported on by newscasters across the United States. He has performed in all 50 states, Canada, and Europe, and was interviewed by Mark Twain scholar Shelley Fisher Fishkin for her book Lighting Out for the Territory published by Oxford University Press.

Richters performed with the American author and journalist Tom Wolfe at the 150th Anniversary Gala celebration for Harper's Magazine in New York City. It was after his performance at this event that he was asked by PBS to provide the voice of Mark Twain for their Culture Shock – Challenging Art series. His career as Mark Twain also includes starring in the one-hour television special America’s First Stand-Up Comedian, touring with the Hartford Symphony Pops in their production Mark Twain, Music & Mischief, and appearances for Fortune 500 companies.

In recognition of the 100th Anniversary of the celebrated author's death, he has toured Russia and Ukraine performing as Mark Twain on behalf of the U.S. State Department, retracing Twain’s travels to Odessa, Sevastopol and Yalta chronicled in his first book Innocents Abroad. Richters was such a hit in Russia, the originally scheduled cultural exchange weekend had to be extended because of high demand. In addition to his performances as Twain, he was scheduled to “present a master class in acting at Moscow State University and attend a round of social events, including a reception and dinner at the U.S. Embassy in Moscow.”

== 1996 U.S. Presidential Debates ==
Richters was credited as one of the people responsible for bringing the 1996 Presidential Debates between President Bill Clinton and Senator Bob Dole to Hartford, Connecticut. Prior to the debate sites being chosen, the executive director for the Commission on Presidential Debates Janet H. Brown visited Connecticut and saw Richters perform. He was said to have a lasting impression on Brown who stated "I remember sitting there listening and thinking how poignant it was...It was so touching, even moving. I ran outside and said to him, 'We found our moderator.'" The debate in Hartford was the first national election debate ever held in New England.

== Philanthropy ==
Richters supports numerous charities including the Gridiron Greats, a charity that supports retired NFL players who are disabled or have other post-career issues. In 2011, he appeared as a celebrity guest in Dallas, Texas at The Best Party in Texas Super Bowl party hosted by Carmen Electra, Bill Rancic and his wife Giuliana Rancic, and the Feliciano Foundation. All proceeds from the star-studded Super Bowl party were being donated to charity. He also raises money for charity by performing as Mark Twain, including a public debate with Hartford mayor Mike Peters. He has also performed at the annual benefit production for Paul Newman's Hole in the Wall Gang Camp for children with cancer and other life-threatening diseases.
