= In Her Shoes (film) =

- International Theatrical release poster
- Directed by: Curtis Hanson
- Screenplay by: Susannah Grant
- Based on: In Her Shoes by Jennifer Weiner
- Produced by: Ridley Scott; Carol Fenelon; Lisa Ellzey; Curtis Hanson
- Starring: Cameron Diaz; Toni Collette; Shirley MacLaine; Mark Feuerstein
- Cinematography: Terry Stacey
- Edited by: Lisa Zeno Churgin; Craig Kitson
- Music by: Mark Isham
- Production companies: Fox 2000 Pictures; Scott Free Productions; Deuce Three Productions
- Distributed by: 20th Century Fox
- Release dates: September 14, 2005 (TIFF); October 7, 2005 (United States)
- Running time: 130 minutes
- Country: United States
- Language: English
- Budget: $35 million
- Box office: $83.6 million

In Her Shoes is a 2005 American romantic comedy-drama film directed by Curtis Hanson and written by Susannah Grant, based on the 2002 novel of the same name by Jennifer Weiner. It stars Cameron Diaz, Toni Collette, and Shirley MacLaine.

The plot follows the conservative, serious Rose who cuts ties with her irresponsible, partier sister Maggie after catching her in bed with Rose's boyfriend. Later, they inadvertently discover Ella, the grandmother neither knew existed.

In Her Shoes premiered at the 2005 Toronto International Film Festival, and was released in the United States on October 7, 2005, by 20th Century Fox. It grossed $83.6 million worldwide against a $35 million budget, and received mostly positive reviews from critics.

== Plot ==
Sisters Maggie and Rose Feller are very different, raised by their father Michael and their stepmother Sydelle, as their mother Caroline died in a car accident when they were young. Rose is an ostensibly plain and serious lawyer and, as the eldest, is protective of Maggie despite her flaws. A free spirit, Maggie cannot hold a steady job (partly due to her dyslexia) and turns to alcohol and men for emotional and financial support.

After Sydelle throws Maggie out, Rose grudgingly allows her move in with her in her Rittenhouse Square apartment in Philadelphia. Maggie struggles to get work and soon causes her problems, including getting her car towed. Their already difficult relationship worsens when Rose catches her in bed with Jim, a workmate Rose had been seeing. Heartbroken and furious she throws Maggie out.

A few days before, while looking through her father's desk for money, Maggie discovered a bundle of old birthday cards for her and Rose containing cash, from their "estranged" grandmother Ella. Homeless and without job prospects, she travels to Deerfield Beach, Florida, to find her. Believing Maggie is on vacation, Ella invites her to stay with her. Ella confides to her close friend Ethel that Caroline was mentally ill and prior to her death, wrote her a note asking she look after her daughters.

As time passes, Ella realizes Maggie has visited only to sunbathe and steal money from her. After Maggie asks her to finance an acting career, Ella proposes to match her salary if she accepts a job with the assisted living section of the retirement community.

Meanwhile, Rose quits her job to avoid the lawyer she had been seeing and becomes a dog-walker. She begins dating Simon Stein, a colleague from the law firm. They fall in love and get engaged. Maggie is befriended by a patient, a blind retired professor of English literature, who asks her to read poetry to him. (Note: The first poem she is asked to read is "One art" by Elizabeth Bishop.) Due to her dyslexia, Maggie struggles at first, but she improves with the professor's guidance and emotional support.

Maggie also becomes friendly with other residents of the retirement community, and discovers some need a personal clothing shopper, an activity she has a knack for. Ella offers to run the financial aspects of the business, which quickly takes off, and she and Maggie become close.

Meanwhile, Rose's reluctance to talk about Maggie is straining her relationships with Simon and her father. While Michael remains oblivious to his daughters' falling out, Simon tries to get Rose to talk about her. When he sees her confiding to Jim about her issues instead, Simon breaks off the engagement.

Ella contacts Rose, sending her a plane ticket to visit. Rose confronts her father about hiding their grandmother from her and Maggie. He reluctantly explains Ella had not approved of Caroline having children because of her mental illness and tendency to neglect her medication, so had blamed him for her death.

Rose is excited to meet her long-lost grandmother, but her pleasure quickly sours when she arrives and discovers Maggie already living there. While reminiscing with them, Maggie recounts the story of their mother taking them on a spontaneous trip to New York. They recognize the details of the story demonstrate Caroline was unwell, while Maggie is oblivious.

Rose reveals that Michael and Caroline had a huge argument after the trip, and he had threatened to put her in a mental institution. Caroline killed herself two days later. Maggie realizes Rose had shielded her from the truth about their mother, and they reconcile.

Simon arrives in Florida, summoned by Maggie, and he and Rose make up. At last, she opens up to him about Maggie and her desire to protect her, fearing Simon would come to hate Maggie. Later, Rose's wedding takes place at the Jamaican Jerk Hut in Philadelphia where they had their first date. Ella and Michael reconcile, and Maggie reads a poem as a wedding gift, which moves Rose to tears.

== Cast ==
- Cameron Diaz as Maggie Feller
- Toni Collette as Rose Feller, Maggie's older sister
- Shirley MacLaine as Ella Hirsch, Maggie and Rose's maternal grandmother
- Mark Feuerstein as Simon Stein
- Ken Howard as Michael Feller, Maggie and Rose's widowed father
- Candice Azzara as Sydelle Feller, Maggie and Rose's stepmother
- Francine Beers as Mrs. Lefkowitz
- Norman Lloyd as The Professor
- Jerry Adler as Lewis Feldman
- Brooke Smith as Amy
- Richard Burgi as Jim Danvers
- Anson Mount as Todd
- Eric Balfour as Grant
- Alan Blumenfeld as Mr. Stein
- Andy Powers as Tim
- Ivana Miličević as Caroline, Maggie and Rose's late mother (in photos).
- Benton Jennings as shoe salesman John Johnson
- Jennifer Weiner as smiling woman in Italian market

== Reception ==
=== Critical reception ===
In Her Shoes has received generally positive reviews from critics. Rotten Tomatoes reported that 74% of critics gave the film positive reviews, based on 160 reviews, with an average rating of 6.80/10. The site's critical consensus reads: "Honesty and solid performances make In Her Shoes a solid fit for all audiences". Metacritic reports an average review score of 60%, based on 36 reviews. Audiences polled by CinemaScore gave the film an average grade of "A−" on an A+ to F scale.

Rex Reed in The New York Observer calls In Her Shoes "pure joy" and "a movie to cherish", arguing that Shirley MacLaine has "found her finest role since the Oscar-winning Terms of Endearment ... funny and poignant, she uses abundant humanity and smart psychology to great advantage, lending her knowledge to the other actors generously." Roger Ebert of the Chicago Sun-Times states that the film "starts out with the materials of an ordinary movie and becomes a rather special one. The emotional payoff at the end is earned, not because we see it coming as the inevitable outcome of the plot, but because it arrives out of the blue and yet, once we think about it, makes perfect sense. It tells us something fundamental and important about a character, it allows her to share that something with those she loves, and it does it in a way we could not possibly anticipate. Like a good poem, it blindsides us with the turn it takes right at the end."

Mick LaSalle of the San Francisco Chronicle argues, on the other hand, that the film "is almost a true statement, almost an honest rendering of a sibling relationship and almost not a sentimental Hallmark card of a movie. But it compromises with itself and ends up in a limbo of meaninglessness, with writer Susannah Grant and director Curtis Hanson strenuously pretending to have told one kind of story, when actually they've told quite another." Carino Chocano of the Los Angeles Times concurred, calling the film "a curious movie, hovering for upward of two hours between light and dark, truth and fake uplift, menace and mollycoddling."

== Box office ==
The film opened at #3 at the U.S. box office, earning $10,017,575 USD in its first opening weekend. Its worldwide gross totaled $83,697,473.

== Nominations ==
Shirley MacLaine

- Golden Globe Award for Best Supporting Actress - Motion Picture
- Satellite Award for Best Supporting Actress - Motion Picture

Toni Collette

- Satellite Award for Best Actress - Motion Picture Drama
- Australian Film Institute Award for Best Actress

Cameron Diaz

- Imagen Foundation Award for Best Actress

== See also ==
- List of artistic depictions of dyslexia
