= Dyslexia Action =

Nonprofit organisation in England

Coordinates: 51.4362°N 0.5015°W

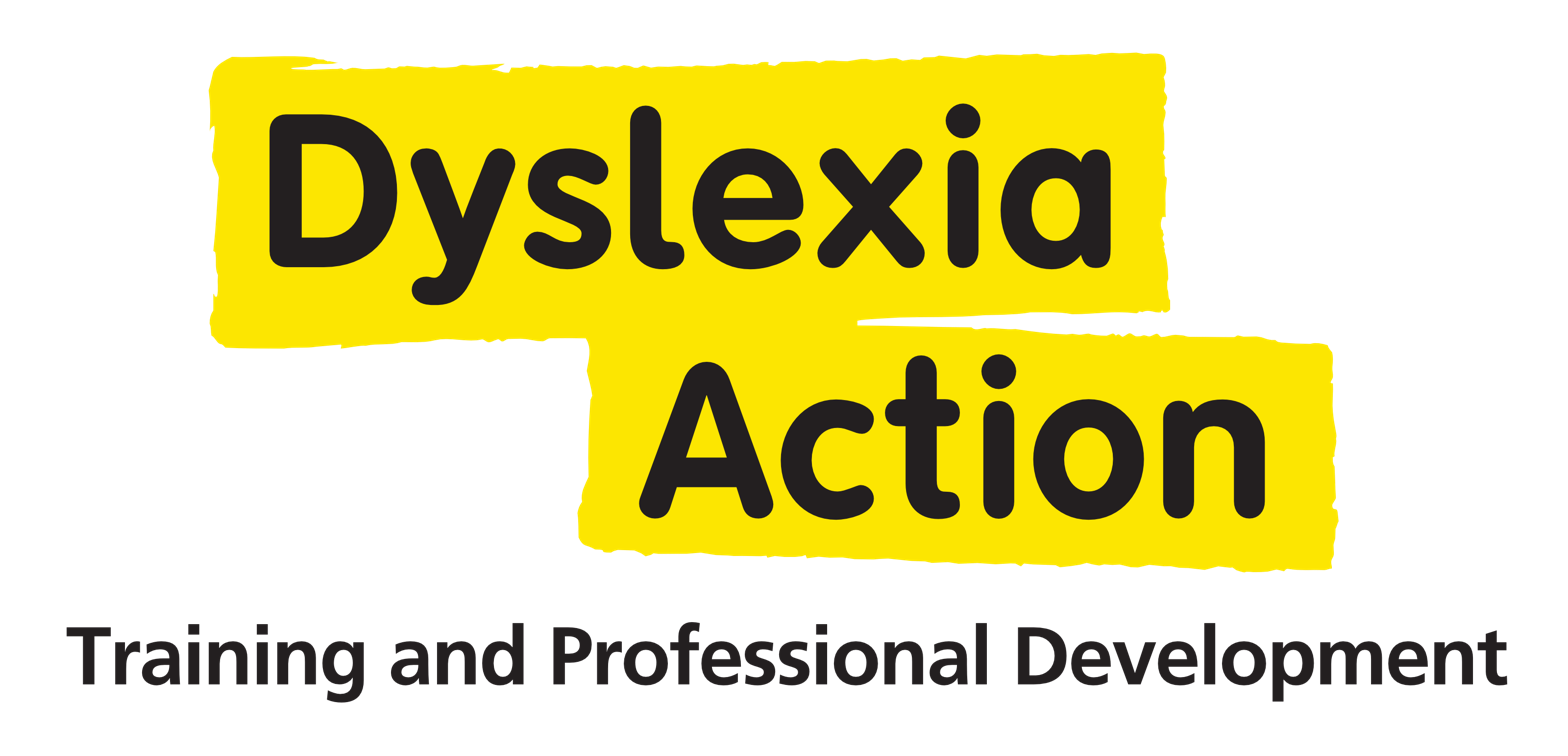
Logo of Dyslexia Action

Dyslexia Action (formerly the Dyslexia Institute) is an organisation based in Staines-upon-Thames, Surrey, England, founded in 1972.

== History ==
The Word Blind Centre was the first established clinic in Britain that catered to children diagnosed with dyslexia. The clinic also gathered evidence to improve the classification of dyslexia as a disorder. The centre was closed in 1971 due to a lack of funds. In 1972, the Surrey Dyslexia Institute, which had been in existence since 1968, was converted into the Dyslexia Institute by Wendy Fisher and Kathleen Hickey. Kathleen Hickey became the Director of Studies at the institute, and created "The Hickey Program", a course written and directed by Hickey, that focused on ways in which teachers can teach people with dyslexia in the UK.

By 1981, the Institute had acquired 12 centres across Britain, and in 1993, the Institute began to offer its own Postgraduate Diploma course validated by Kingston University, and later York University and Middlesex University. In February 2003, Sophie, Countess of Wessex, agreed to become the organisation's Patron. In July 2003 the Countess opened the institute's Head Office at Park House in Egham, Surrey. In 2005, the Dyslexia Institute merged with Hornsby International Dyslexia Centre, and was renamed Dyslexia Action in March 2006. Dyslexia Action's head office moved to Egham in May 2014 and the Countess officially opened the Egham Learning Centre during Dyslexia Awareness Week on 4 November 2014.

On 13 April 2017, Matthew Haw and Karen Spears of RSM Restructuring Advisory LLP were appointed as administrators of Dyslexia Institute Limited t/a Dyslexia Action. Following negotiations, the Training division, Shop, and Guild were purchased by Real Group Ltd and continue to trade.

Dyslexia Action Training, the Dyslexia Action Shop, and Dyslexia Action Guild were successfully acquired by Real Group Ltd and continue to trade alongside sister companies Real Training and Educational and Sporting Futures.

Dyslexia Action Training is now solely a training provider and no longer provides personal dyslexia advice, dyslexia tuition, dyslexia assessments, and does not hold any historical copies of dyslexia assessments. Historical documents relating to the charity as an organisation have been deposited with the Wellcome Collection

== Current services ==
Dyslexia Action has three main divisions; the first, Dyslexia Action Training, offers online training at various levels to help education professionals teach dyslexic students, and learn about co-occurring learning difficulties. The developmental training offers a number of services for those who are already trained or interested in becoming SpLD specialist teachers and assessors. The second division, The Dyslexia Guild, is an open membership group with members working and learning in a wide range of settings. The third division, the Dyslexia Action Shop, is an online resource that contains tools for educators and parents to support dyslexic children.
