= Jennifer Weiner =

American writer (born 1970)

- Born: March 28, 1970 (age 56); DeRidder, Louisiana, U.S.
- Education: Princeton University (AB)
- Occupation: Novelist
- Spouse: Bill Syken (m. 2016)
- Children: 2
- Writing career
- Genres: Fiction, Women's fiction
- Notable works: Good in Bed (2001); In Her Shoes (2002)
- Website: jenniferweiner.com

Jennifer Weiner (born March 28, 1970) is an American writer, television producer, and journalist. She is based in Philadelphia, Pennsylvania. Her debut novel, published in 2001, was Good in Bed. Her novel In Her Shoes (2002) was made into a movie starring Cameron Diaz, Toni Collette, and Shirley MacLaine.

== Background and education ==
Weiner was born to a Jewish family in DeRidder, Louisiana, where her father was stationed as an army physician. The next year, her family (including a younger sister and two brothers) moved to Simsbury, Connecticut, where Weiner spent her childhood.

When Weiner was 16, her father abandoned the family. He died of a crack cocaine overdose in 2008.

Her first novel, Good in Bed, is loosely based on her life: like the main character, Cannie Shapiro, Weiner's parents divorced when she was 16, and her mother came out as a lesbian at age 55.

Weiner has said that she was "one of only nine Jewish kids in her high school class of 400" at Simsbury High School. She entered Princeton University at the age of 17 and graduated summa cum laude with an A.B. in English in 1991 after completing a senior thesis titled "'Never Far From Mother—' On the Uses of Essentialism in Novels and Films."

At Princeton, Weiner studied with J. D. McClatchy, Ann Lauterbach, John McPhee, Toni Morrison, and Joyce Carol Oates. Her first published story, "Tour of Duty", appeared in Seventeen in 1992.

== Career ==
After graduating from college, Weiner joined the Centre Daily Times, the daily newspaper of State College, Pennsylvania, where she managed the education beat and wrote a regular column called "Generation XIII" (referring to the 13th generation following the American Revolution, aka Generation X). She then joined Kentucky's Lexington Herald-Leader, still penning her "Generation XIII" column, before finding a job with The Philadelphia Inquirer as a features reporter. She wrote for the Inquirer while freelancing for Mademoiselle, Seventeen, and other publications, until after her first novel, Good in Bed, was published in 2001. In 2005, her second novel, In Her Shoes (2002), was made into a feature film starring Cameron Diaz, Toni Collette and Shirley MacLaine by 20th Century Fox. Her sixth novel, Best Friends Forever, was a No. 1 New York Times bestseller and made Publishers Weekly's list of the longest-running bestsellers of the year. Weiner has written nine bestselling books, including eight novels and a collection of short stories, with a reported 11 million copies in print in 36 countries. Her writing on gender and culture appears frequently in The New York Times.

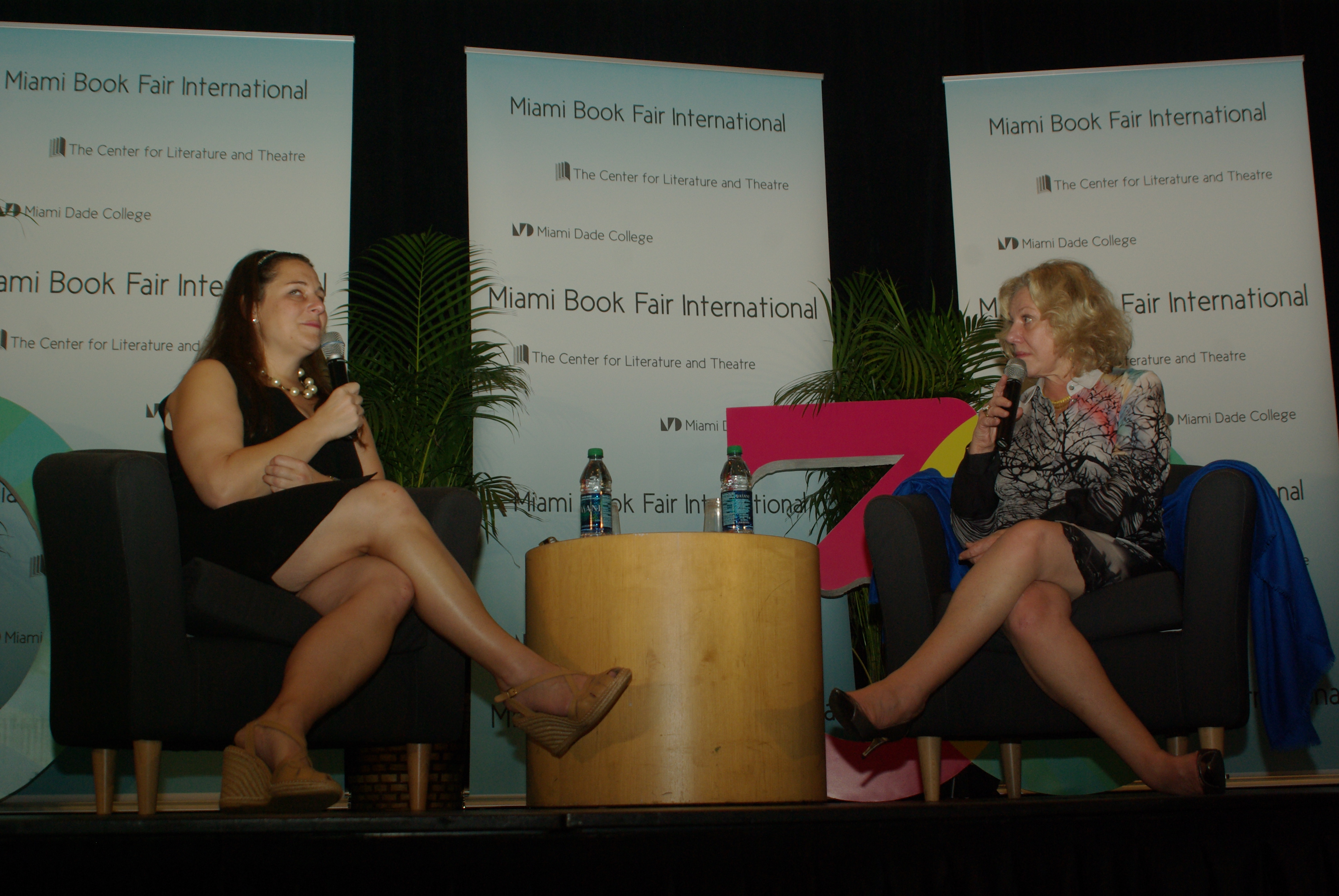
Jennifer Weiner and Erica Jong at the Miami Book Fair International 2013

In addition to writing fiction, Weiner was a co-creator and executive producer of the ABC Family sitcom State of Georgia, and she was known for "live-tweeting" episodes of the reality dating shows The Bachelor and The Bachelorette. In 2011, TIME named her to its list of the Top 140 Twitter Feeds "shaping the conversation." She is a self-described feminist.

=== Criticism of gender bias in the media ===
Weiner has been a vocal critic of what she sees as the male bias in the publishing industry and the media, alleging that books by men are better received than those by women—reviewed more often and more favorably. In 2010, she told The Huffington Post, "I think it's a very old and deep-seated double standard that holds that when a man writes about family and feelings, it's literature with a capital L, but when a woman considers the same topics, it's romance, or a beach book—in short, it's something unworthy of a serious critic's attention. ... I think it's irrefutable that when it comes to picking favorites—those lucky few writers who get the double reviews AND the fawning magazine profile AND the back-page essay space AND the op-ed ... the Times tends to pick white guys." In a 2011 interview with The Wall Street Journal blog Speakeasy, she said, "There are gatekeepers who say chick lit doesn’t deserve attention but then they review Stephen King." When Jonathan Franzen's novel Freedom was published in 2010 to critical acclaim and extensive media coverage (including a cover story in TIME), Weiner criticized what she saw as "overcoverage", igniting a debate over whether the media's adulation of Franzen was an example of entrenched sexism in the literary establishment. Weiner received some backlash from other female writers for her criticisms, but a 2011 study by the organization VIDA bore out many of her claims, and in an interview with The Daily Telegraph, Franzen said: "To a considerable extent, I agree. When a male writer simply writes adequately about family, his book gets reviewed seriously, because: 'Wow, a man has actually taken some interest in the emotional texture of daily life', whereas with a woman it's liable to be labelled chick-lit. There is a long-standing gender imbalance in what goes into the canon, however you want to define the canon."

Weiner has expressed ambivalence about the term "chick lit", embracing the genre it stands for while criticizing its use as a pejorative for commercial women's fiction. She has said: "I'm not crazy about the label because I think it comes with a built-in assumption that you've written nothing more meaningful or substantial than a mouthful of cotton candy. As a result, critics react a certain way without ever reading the books." In 2008, Weiner published a critique of Curtis Sittenfeld's review of a Melissa Bank novel, writing, "The more I think about the review, the more I think about the increasingly angry divide between ladies who write literature and chicks who write chick lit, the more it seems like a grown-up version of the smart versus pretty games of years ago; like so much jockeying for position in the cafeteria and mocking the girls who are nerdier/sluttier/stupider than you to make yourself feel more secure about your own place in the pecking order."

In 2019, Weiner participated in the harassment and abuse of Brooke Nelson, a college student the local newspaper reported had said she thought that Sarah Dessen's YA novels were unsuitable for the Common Read program run by Northern State University and had advocated for the inclusion of civil rights attorney Bryan Stevenson's memoir, Just Mercy, instead. In a series of since deleted tweets, Weiner called Nelson's opposition to Dessen's inclusion in the Common Reads program "catty and cruel" and part of "systemic discrimination" against young women, and linked it to gymnastics doctor Larry Nassar's repeated sexual assaults on young women. She later said she had "zero regrets" about those remarks. When the story was reported in Jezebel, The Guardian, The Washington Post, and Slate, Weiner reportedly regretted her actions.

== Film adaptations and television appearances ==
=== In Her Shoes ===
In Her Shoes (2002) was made into a major motion picture in 2005 with Cameron Diaz, Toni Collette and Shirley MacLaine. Weiner has a cameo appearance in the film.

=== State of Georgia ===
After signing a development deal with ABC Family in 2008, Weiner wrote a pilot for a half-hour sitcom with producer Jeff Greenstein (Desperate Housewives), originally called The Great State of Georgia and starring a plus-sized young woman who aspires to be a Broadway star. In 2010, the network ordered the show, renamed State of Georgia, to series, and 12 episodes aired in 2011. On September 16, 2011, Weiner announced the show's cancellation.

=== Television appearances ===
Weiner made her TV debut on The Tony Danza Show in 2005, reappearing in 2006. She made a cameo appearance as herself in the Younger episode "The Jade Crusade" in 2016.

== Personal life ==
Weiner married attorney Adam Bonin in 2001. They have two children and separated in 2010. On March 19, 2016, she married writer Bill Syken.

== Published works ==
=== Novels ===
- Good in Bed (2001) – Chronicles the experiences of Candace Shapiro, a Jewish journalist from Philadelphia. The plot of the story revolves around the distress that comes from leading an unstable love life while trying to balance a professional career. Candace learns the positive benefits of being independent during tough times in her life. Weiner often acknowledges the influence that her personal history played in her first official novel.
- In Her Shoes (2002) – Published in September 2002, In Her Shoes tells the story of two sisters who have nothing in common, except their shoe size, and a grandmother neither of them ever knew. USA Today says the book "will make you laugh and possibly cry." In October 2005, the novel was turned into a major motion picture, starring Cameron Diaz, Toni Collette and Shirley Maclaine.
- Little Earthquakes (2004) – This book contains the story of a newscaster, Ayinde, who moves to Philadelphia following her husband who is an NBA player for the 76ers. She becomes friends with Becky and Kelly and together they created an unbreakable sisterhood bond.
- Goodnight Nobody (2005) – This story follows the story of Kate Klein who relocates her family and herself to Upchurch, Connecticut. She lives the suburban mom lifestyle and later spends her time starting an investigation, along with two of her friends, about the death of Kitty Cavanaugh.
- The Guy Not Taken (2006) – This is a collection of eleven separate stories from Weiner. The stories cover many subject areas, from a teenage girl coping with the loss of her father, to a widow opening up her home to a pair of homeless girls.
- Certain Girls (2008) – Certain Girls is the sequel to Good In Bed. Released in April 2008, it begins where Cannie, the heroine of Good In Bed left off with her debut novel becoming an overnight bestseller.
- Best Friends Forever (2009) - Two childhood friends named Valerie Adler and Adelaide "Addie" Downs are reunited when Valerie believes she accidentally ran over the star football player at their high school reunion.
- Fly Away Home (2010)
- Then Came You (2011)
- The Next Best Thing (2012)
- All Fall Down (2014)
- Who Do You Love (2015) – This story is about two young children who meet in a hospital and are forced to part ways. Thinking that they will never see each other again, they move on with their lives, only to later end up in the presence of each other, where they must decide if their love can keep them together.
- Mrs. Everything (2019)
- Big Summer (2020)
- That Summer (2021)
- The Summer Place (2022)
- The Breakaway (2023)
- The Griffin Sisters' Greatest Hits (2025)

=== Short stories ===
- Disconnected (2013)
- Recalculating (2011)
- Swim (2012)
- The Half Life (2010)
- A Memoir of Grief (2012)
- Good Men (2013)

=== Nonfiction ===
- Hungry Heart: Adventures in Life, Love, and Writing (2016)

=== Essays ===
- "Victoria's Secret Finally Set Its Angels Free. Better Late Than Never." (New York Times, June 17, 2021)
