= Jeff Greenstein =

American television writer, producer, and director

- Born: November 21, 1963 (age 62); Atlanta, Georgia, U.S.
- Education: Tufts University (BA)
- Occupations: Television writer; producer; director
- Spouse: Paulina Porizkova (m. 2026)
- Awards: Primetime Emmy Award for Outstanding Comedy Series

Jeff Greenstein (born November 21, 1963) is an American television writer, producer and director. Greenstein was the showrunner of Will & Grace and Dream On, as well as on Partners and Getting Personal, both of which he created. A member of the Writers Guild and Directors Guild of America, Greenstein also created the television series State of Georgia.

== Early life and education ==
Greenstein grew up in the Sandy Springs suburb of Atlanta, Georgia. He has three siblings, sister Jill Cohen and brothers Keith and Steven Greenstein. Greenstein attended Riverwood High School and graduated from Tufts University, where he began as a computer science major, careened through the art history department, and ended up with a degree in film and dance.

== Career ==
Greenstein wrote episodes of The Charmings and Mr. Belvedere, but his first job was on Dream On, where he remained for five seasons, first as a writer and later as showrunner. He then signed on as a writer on the show Friends for its inaugural season. He was the co-creator and co-showrunner of Partners, and also co-created, produced, wrote for, and was the showrunner on Getting Personal.

Greenstein was the senior writer for Will & Grace for its first six seasons, and showrunner for Seasons 5 and 6. He also helped launch Parenthood, and wrote for, executive produced, and directed Desperate Housewives. His directing credits include Husbands, which he also executive produced, as well as Mom, The Odd Couple, 9JKL, Happy Together, and The Neighborhood.

Greenstein produces and co-hosts the film photography podcast I Dream of Cameras.

== Personal life ==
Since February 2023, Greenstein has been in a relationship with model Paulina Porizkova. The couple became engaged in July 2025, and they married in July 2026.

== Filmography ==
=== Television ===
- The Charmings (writer)
- Mr. Belvedere (writer - 1 episode, 1988)
- Charles in Charge (writer - 1 episode, 1989)
- Dream On
- Incredi-Girl (creator/co-executive producer - TV movie, 1993)
- Friends (writer - 4 episodes, 1994–1995) (supervising producer - 23 episodes, 1994–1995)
- Partners (co-showrunner/co-creator, 1995–1996)
- Getting Personal (writer/executive producer, 1998)
- Will & Grace (head writer, showrunner)
- Jake in Progress (writer - 1 episode, 2005) (executive producer - 1 episode, 2006)
- Desperate Housewives (writer/director/producer)
- The Rich Inner Life of Penelope Cloud (writer/executive producer - TV movie, 2007)
- Parenthood
- State of Georgia (creator/writer/executive producer - 2011)
- Husbands (director/executive producer)
- Way to Go (writer/director - 1 episode, 2013)
- Mom (director - 11 episodes, 2013–2015)
- The Odd Couple (director - 4 episodes, 2016)
- 9JKL (director - 2 episodes, 2017)
- Happy Together (director - 2 episodes, 2018)
- The Neighborhood (director - 3 episodes, 2018–2019)
- RVs and Cats (director - TV special, 2020)
- Extended Family (director - 2 episodes, 2024)

== Awards and nominations ==
Greenstein has been nominated for Emmy Awards, Producers Guild awards, Writers Guild Awards, and the CableACE awards. He won the 2000 Emmy for Outstanding Comedy Series as a co-executive producer of Will & Grace, and the CableACE award for his work on Dream On.

Greenstein received a 2001 Emmy nomination as a writer for the Will & Grace one-hour flashback episode "Lows in the Mid-Eighties".

In 2009, Greenstein received the P.T. Barnum Award for Excellence in Entertainment, an alumni award from Tufts University.
