= Good in Bed =

2001 novel by Jennifer Weiner

Good In Bed
- Author: Jennifer Weiner
- Language: English
- Genre: Fiction
- Publisher: Washington Square Press
- Publication date: 2001
- Publication place: United States
- Media type: HardcoverPaperback
- ISBN: 978-0743418171

Good In Bed is the debut novel of Jennifer Weiner. It tells the story of an overweight Jewish female journalist, her love and work life and her emotional abuse issues with her father. The novel was a New York Times Best Seller and as of 2020 is being adapted into a film produced by and starring Mindy Kaling for HBO Max. Aspects of the plot were inspired by Weiner's own life.

== Plot summary ==
Candace (Cannie) Shapiro is a smart, sarcastic, and successful entertainment journalist living in Philadelphia. Although she has a small group of close friends, including her best friend Samantha, her overbearing but caring mother, and her rat terrier, Nifkin, she has a day to day struggle with her weight, a recent breakup with her boyfriend of three years, and the relationship issues left on her when her father left her as a child.

One day, she reads a magazine article written by her ex-boyfriend, Bruce, telling his opinions on "loving a larger woman," simply naming the woman as "C." Outraged and humiliated, Cannie approaches Bruce hoping to get some answers, but only makes things worse when she loses her temper and causes him to say it's over between them for good.

However, a few weeks later when Cannie learns that Bruce's father has died, she attends the funeral to give her condolences and maybe make things better between her and Bruce. Things don't go exactly as planned, and Cannie and Bruce end up having sex. Cannie thinks this may be the start of them getting back together, but is hurt when Bruce says they should no longer see each other, as he is seeing someone else.

Trying to forget about Bruce, Cannie decides to fix up her life a little bit by attending a weight-loss program, making her job a little more pleasurable, and trying to get the screenplay she wrote into the hands of a Hollywood producer. While in New York for an interview with celebrity Maxi Rider, she becomes close friends with Maxi. Cannie decides to give her the screenplay.

Later at her weight-loss program, Cannie meets with the program's doctor, Dr. K, to discuss her role in the program. Dr. K, however, breaks the news to her that she is not allowed to participate in the program. Cannie is crushed at first, until Dr. K tells her she is not allowed to participate because she is pregnant.

Cannie considers the news and realizes Bruce had gotten her pregnant the day of his father's funeral. She debates abortion and whether she should tell Bruce or not. She ultimately decides to keep the baby and writes a note to Bruce telling him she was pregnant and if he wants a part in his child's life, they should talk. Bruce never responds to the letter and Cannie decides she will raise her child as a single mother.

A few months go by and Cannie, knowing she's going to be a mother and having fallen in love with her baby, is a little happier with her life. She is on good terms with all her friends including Maxi, her mother, even Dr. K (whom she now knows as Peter), who are all supportive of her choice to be a single mom. Things get even better when Maxi tells Cannie she read her screenplay and some producers in Hollywood want to produce it, but she must fly to Hollywood and help with the movie. Cannie agrees and packs her bags for Hollywood.

In Hollywood, Cannie is living the dream staying with Maxi in her L.A. house, attending exclusive parties, and even talking to her celebrity crush. She even considers moving from Philadelphia, but decides against the idea. After a few weeks in California, Cannie returns home.

After getting off her flight, Cannie walks through the airport and spots Bruce and whom she assumes is Bruce's new girlfriend. She briefly talks to Bruce and is rude to his girlfriend. After walking away, she goes to the bathroom but is followed by Bruce's girlfriend. They get into a bit of an argument and Cannie slips on some water and falls, hitting her pregnant belly on the side of the sink.

Cannie wakes up in the hospital confused, until her friends tell her that she'll be fine, but will never be able to have children again, due to her injury requiring her to have a hysterectomy. Her new daughter, Joy, was born prematurely but will be okay as long as she stays in the hospital for a few more weeks.

Cannie soon falls into a deep depression after the incident and slowly pushes her friends and family away. She starts taking long walks through the city and starts eating very little, causing her to lose weight. During one walk through the city, she becomes lost, but finds herself at Peter's office. Peter, aware of her mental state, takes her to his place, lets her shower, and cooks her a warm meal. Cannie realizes how she's been acting, and Peter tells her how much he cares for her.

When Joy is brought home from the hospital, Cannie decides to move into her mother's home but starts becoming more like herself every day. Peter and Cannie start dating, and Cannie seems at peace with her life again. She eventually moves back into her apartment, and Peter tells her he wants to move in with her. As one last change in her life, Cannie decides to go to the magazine Bruce worked for and introduce herself as "C." She is immediately offered a job as writing the "Loving a Larger Woman" column.

== Publication ==
Weiner initially had difficulty finding an agent. As a former journalist, she was unfamiliar with how the publishing world operated, and she made errors when submitting her work. Once she found an agent with whom she could easily collaborate, she said the book was quickly published.

== Reception ==
Entertainment Weekly rated it "A" and wrote, "Dealing with her prickly ex, a newly out mother, and some really unexpected news along the way, Cannie emerges as one of the most engaging, realistic female characters in years." Publishers Weekly wrote, "Weiner's witty, original, fast-moving debut features a lovable heroine, a solid cast, snappy dialogue and a poignant take on life's priorities."

== Film adaptation ==
The book was optioned in 2002 by HBO for screen adaptation. In 2020, it was announced Mindy Kaling would produce, with Jessica Kumai Scott under their Kaling International banner, and star in. Howard Klein of 3 Arts Entertainment, and Jake Weiner and Chris Bender of Good Fear Content would also serve as producers. Elizabeth Sarnoff will write the script.
