= In Her Shoes (novel) =

Book by Jennifer Weiner

- Author: Jennifer Weiner
- Language: English
- Genre: Fiction
- Publisher: Washington Square Press
- Publication date: 2002
- Publication place: United States
- Media type: Paperback
- ISBN: 0-7434-1820-4
- OCLC: 52537940

In Her Shoes (2002) is a work of Jewish American literature by Jennifer Weiner. It tells the story of two sisters and their estranged grandmother. The novel was a New York Times bestseller. The two sisters happen to wear the same size shoes - the only common ground that they have besides a mutual hatred of their step-mother.

== Plot summary ==
Rose and Maggie Feller are two young sisters who share little in common except their shoe size. Rose is the elder and has been watching after Maggie since they were young children and their mother Caroline died in a car accident. They were raised by their father Michael (perpetually in mourning for Caroline) and stepmother Sydelle (who resents them both and often makes Rose feel bad about her weight).

Rose is a thirty-year-old single, successful lawyer who struggles with her weight and who resents her younger sister's beauty and sexual attractiveness and lack of stability. Ever since she was young, Rose has had the desire to be popular. She also feels responsible for her sister and is frustrated with how each attempt to help Maggie backfires on her. Maggie, a twenty-eight-year-old who uses her beauty and charming nature to hide the obstacles she faces due to dyslexia and related learning difficulties, resents Rose's academic success and consequent wealth. Maggie is resentful of only ever holding a series of minimum wage jobs that leave her dependent on the charity of others especially her father and Rose. After middle school, standardized testing sets them on different paths in high school: Rose's success on the exams leads to Princeton University and the University of Pennsylvania Law School; Maggie is unable to take the exams and is consequently sidelined in high school and due to her inability to cope with school work, she drops out of high school. She is unable to hold on to any job for long and struggles to manage her money so much so that she is evicted from her flat. Rose offers to support Maggie until her life gets sorted out by giving her a place to stay. Both are nearing the age of their mother when she died, Rose and Maggie each feel as if there is a vacuum in their lives which they are unable to fill.

After wearing out her welcome with Rose (by sleeping with Rose's boyfriend in Rose's bed) and being evicted from her father's home by her stepmother, Maggie runs away, choosing to hide in Princeton University, which she had visited when Rose was a student. Finding shelter in a lower level of the library (with a fully equipped bathroom/shower), Maggie fills her free time doing something that she had avoided her entire life: reading. She also accepts a part-time position as a care-taker for a nearby elderly woman. Maggie is surprised to find that when reading in her own way at her own pace, she enjoys the activity and even begins to attend a poetry class. Eventually, however, a boy (whose wallet she had stolen) discovers her belongings in the library. Realizing her charade at Princeton is over, Maggie runs away. She travels to find her long-lost grandmother, whose old letters she had discovered previously in her father's desk. Rose, meanwhile, leaves her career in law in order to avoid the boyfriend who betrayed her. As a result of this break she accidentally discovers what life as a dog-walker would be like. She also begins to date Simon Stein, a colleague at the law firm.

Grandma Ella had been forced out of the lives of the girls by their father. He had blamed her for Caroline's death — she had been mentally ill and not taking her medication at the time of her death. Grandma Ella had previously tried to track the girls via the Internet (only finding information on Rose) is delighted to see Maggie and invites her to stay in her home. Gradually Maggie, Ella, and eventually Rose reconcile with each other, and in the process come to terms with both the life and death of Caroline.

Maggie finds her true calling: being a personal shopper to the old people in the community that Grandma Ella lives in. Eventually she is successful enough to open her own shop. She shows Rose that she has become a better person and proves her love by making Rose's wedding dress for her.

== Style ==
The novel is character-driven and it follows each character closely, giving the reader a view of what exactly is going on in their minds.

== Film ==
In Her Shoes (2005) is a film directed by Curtis Hanson with an adapted screenplay by Susannah Grant. It stars Cameron Diaz, Toni Collette, and Shirley MacLaine.

== See also ==
- List of artistic depictions of dyslexia
