= List of Toni Collette performances =

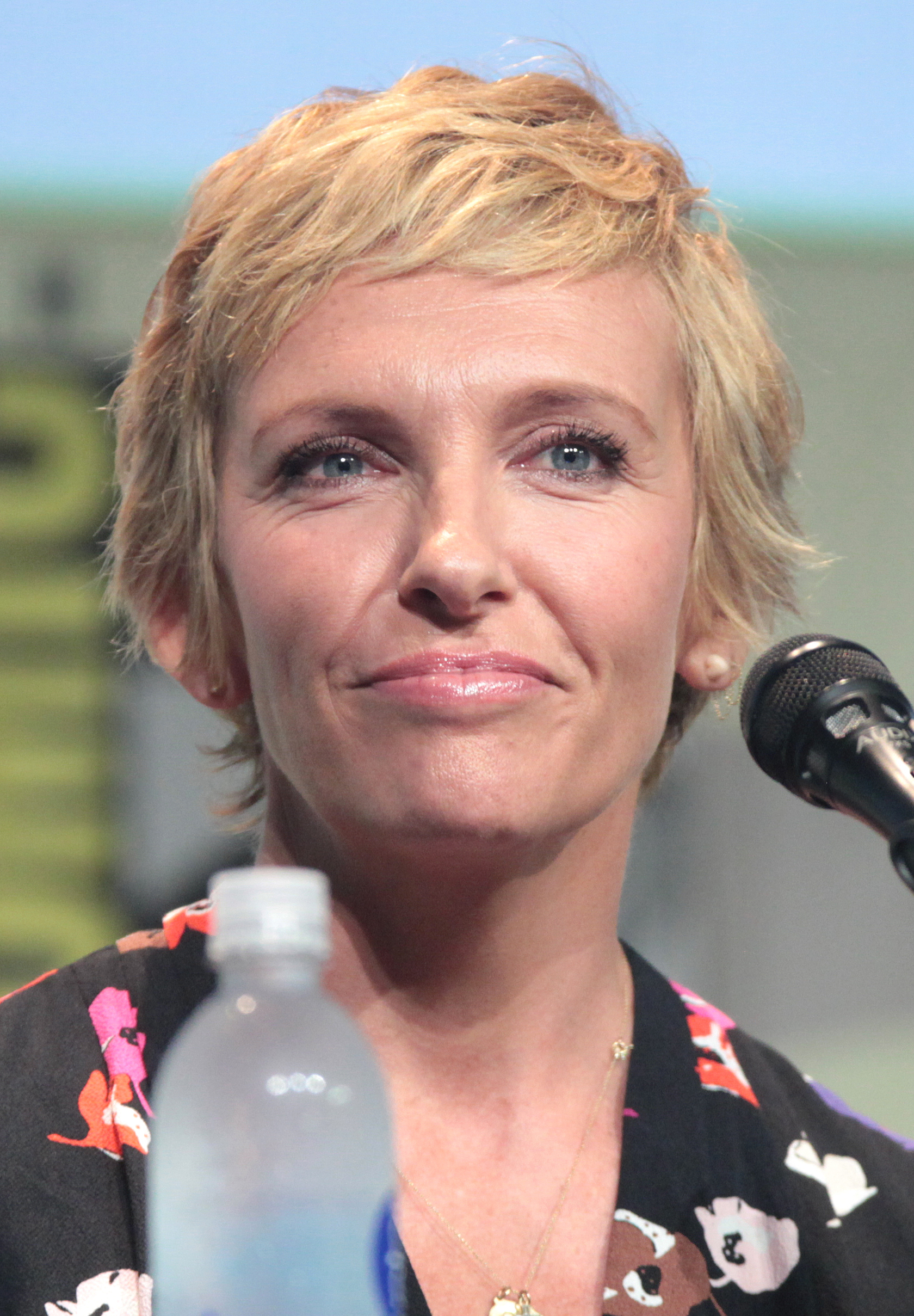
Collette at the 2015 San Diego Comic-Con

Australian actress Toni Collette made her film debut in Spotswood (1992) for which she was nominated for the AACTA Award for Best Actress in a Supporting Role, her breakthrough role came in the comedy-drama Muriel's Wedding (1994), which earned her a Golden Globe Award nomination and won her the AACTA Award for Best Actress in a Leading Role. Collette achieved greater international recognition for her role in the psychological thriller film The Sixth Sense (1999), and was nominated for the Academy Award for Best Supporting Actress.

Collette's films include diverse genres, such as the period comedy Emma (1996), the action thriller Shaft (2000), the period drama The Hours (2002), the romantic drama Japanese Story (2003), the comedies In Her Shoes (2005) and The Way, Way Back (2013), the horror films Krampus (2015) and Hereditary (2018), and the mystery film Knives Out (2019). She received BAFTA Award nominations for her performances in the romantic comedy About a Boy (2002) and the comedy-drama Little Miss Sunshine (2006). Her Broadway performances include the lead role in The Wild Party (2000), which earned her a Tony Award nomination. In television, she starred in the Showtime comedy-drama series United States of Tara (2008–2011) and the Netflix drama miniseries Unbelievable (2019). For the former, she won a Primetime Emmy Award and a Golden Globe Award. She has won five AACTA Awards, from eight nominations.

== Film ==
List of films and roles
Year	Title	Role	Notes	Ref.
1992	Spotswood	Wendy Robinson	Film debut	
1994	This Marching Girl Thing	Cindy	Short film	
1994	Muriel's Wedding	Muriel Heslop		
1995	Arabian Knight	Princess Yum Yum's Nanny / Witch	Voice role	
1996	Così	Julie		
1996	The Pallbearer	Cynthia		
1996	Emma	Harriet Smith		
1996	Lilian's Story	Young Lilian Singer		
1997	Clockwatchers	Iris Chapman		
1997	The James Gang	Julia Armstrong		
1997	Diana & Me	Diana Spencer		
1998	The Boys	Michelle		
1998	Velvet Goldmine	Mandy Slade		
1999	8½ Women	Griselda / Sister Concordia		
1999	The Sixth Sense	Lynn Sear		
2000	Shaft	Diane Palmieri		
2000	Hotel Splendide	Kath		
2000	The Magic Pudding	Meg Bluegum	Voice role	
2002	Changing Lanes	Michelle		
2002	About a Boy	Fiona Brewer		
2002	Dirty Deeds	Sharon Ryan		
2002	The Hours	Kitty		
2003	Japanese Story	Sandy Edwards		
2004	The Last Shot	Emily French		
2004	Connie and Carla	Carla		
2005	In Her Shoes	Rose Feller		
2006	Little Miss Sunshine	Sheryl Hoover		
2006	The Night Listener	Donna D. Logand		
2006	Like Minds	Dr. Sally Rowe	Also executive producer	
2006	The Dead Girl	Arden		
2007	Evening	Nina Mars		
2007	Towelhead	Melina Hines		
2008	The Black Balloon	Maggie Mollison	Also executive producer	
2008	Hey, Hey, It's Esther Blueburger	Mary	Also executive producer	
2009	Mary and Max	Mary Daisy Dinkle	Voice role	
2011	Jesus Henry Christ	Patricia Herman		
2011	Fright Night	Jane Brewster		
2011	Foster	Zooey		
2012	Hitchcock	Peggy Robertson		
2012	Mental	Sharon "Shaz" Thornbender		
2013	The Way, Way Back	Pam		
2013	Enough Said	Sarah		
2013	Lucky Them	Ellie Klug		
2014	A Long Way Down	Maureen Thompson		
2014	Tammy	Missi Jenkins		
2014	Hector and the Search for Happiness	Agnes		
2014	The Boxtrolls	Lady Portley-Rind	Voice role	
2014	Glassland	Jean		
2015	Blinky Bill the Movie	Beryl / Cheryl	Voice roles	
2015	Miss You Already	Milly		
2015	Krampus	Sarah Engel		
2016	Imperium	Angela Zamparo		
2017	Jasper Jones	Ruth Bucktin		
2017	XXX: Return of Xander Cage	Jane Marke		
2017	The Yellow Birds	Amy Bartle		
2017	Fun Mom Dinner	Kate		
2017	Unlocked	Emily Knowles		
2017	Madame	Anne Fredericks		
2017	Please Stand By	Scottie		
2018	Hereditary	Annie Graham	Also executive producer	
2018	Hearts Beat Loud	Leslie		
2018	Birthmarked	Catherine		
2019	Velvet Buzzsaw	Gretchen		
2019	Knives Out	Joni Thrombey		
2020	Dream Horse	Jan Vokes		
2020	I'm Thinking of Ending Things	Suzie		
2021	Stowaway	Marina Barnett		
2021	Nightmare Alley	Zeena Krumbein		
2022	The Estate	Macey		
2023	Mafia Mamma	Kristin	Also producer	
2023	Ruby Gillman, Teenage Kraken	Agatha Gillman	Voice role	
2024	Juror #2	Faith Killebrew		
2025	Mickey 17	Ylfa Marshall		
2025	Under the Stars	Audrey		
2025	Goodbye June	Helen Cheshire		
TBA	Ibelin	Trude Steen	Post-production	
TBA	2034	TBA	Post-production	

== Television ==
Year	Title	Role	Notes	Ref.
1990	A Country Practice	Tracy	Episode: "The Sting: Part 1"	
1998; 2003	The Movie Show	Herself	SBS TV series, 2 episodes	
2001	Dinner with Friends	Beth	Television film	
2004	Live At The Basement	Herself as Singer/Performer	ABC TV series, 1 episode	
2005	Rove Live	Herself & Cameron Diaz	TV series, 1 episode	
2006	Tsunami: The Aftermath	Kathy Graham	Television film	
2009–2011	United States of Tara	Tara Gregson	Title role; also executive producer	
2012	Rake	Premier Claudia Marshall	Episode: "R vs Mohammed"	
2013–2014	Hostages	Ellen Sanders	Main role	
2014	Devil's Playground	Margaret Wallace	Episode: "I Will Bring Fire onto This Earth"	
2015	Who Do You Think You Are?	Herself	Episode: "Toni Collette"	
2018	Wanderlust	Joy Richards	Main role; also associate producer	
2019	Unbelievable	Grace Rasmussen	Main role, miniseries	
2021	Odd Squad	The Sand Queen	Episode: "End of the Road"	
2022	Pieces of Her	Laura Oliver	Title role; also producer	
2022	The Staircase	Kathleen Peterson	Main role, miniseries	
2023	The Power	Margot Cleary-Lopez	Main role	
2025	Wayward	Evelyn Wade	Main role, miniseries	

== Stage ==
Year	Title	Role	Notes	Ref.
1988	Burger Brain - The Fast Food Musical	Hanna	Everest Theatre (Seymour Centre), Chippendale, NSW	
1990	Operation Holy Mountain	Debbie	Q Theatre, Penrith	
1990–1991	A Little Night Music	Petra	Drama Theatre, Sydney Opera House	
1992	A Pocketful of Hula Dreams	—N/a	Harold Park Hotel, Glebe	
1992	Away	Meg	Blackfriars Theatre, Sydney	
1992	Uncle Vanya	Sonya	Drama Theatre, Sydney Opera House	
1992	The Frogs	Chorus	Belvoir Street Theatre, Surry Hills	
1993	Summer of the Aliens	Bev / Beatrice	Wharf Theatre, Walsh Bay	
1994	King Lear	Cordelia	Drama Theatre, Sydney Opera House	
2000	The Wild Party	Queenie	Virginia Theatre, Broadway	
2014	The Realistic Joneses	Jennifer Jones	Lyceum Theatre, Broadway	

== Audio ==
Year	Title	Role	Notes	Ref.
2026	The Murder at the Vicarage	Miss Marple	Audible original	
