= Pearls Before Swine (musical) =

- Original cast recording
- Music: Chris Harriott
- Lyrics: Dennis Watkins
- Book: Dennis Watkins
- Premiere: 13 May 1986: Belvoir St Theatre, Sydney
- Productions: 1986 Sydney/Melbourne; 1988 Penrith

Pearls Before Swine is an Australian musical with book and lyrics by Dennis Watkins and music by Chris Harriott. Billed as "in the tradition of South Pacific and Apocalypse Now", it is a satirical take on Australia's involvement in the Vietnam War, suggesting that one of the world's worst cabaret entertainers, Lamont Cranston, was responsible for the My Lai Massacre.

== Production history ==
Pearls Before Swine opened at Sydney's Belvoir St Theatre on 13 May 1986. It was directed by Geoffrey Rush with choreography by Mark Daly and musical direction by Harriott. The cast included Dennis Watkins (Lamont Cranston), Valerie Bader, Terry Serio, Robyne Dunn, Jenny Vuletic, Mark Daly, Toni Allaylis and Jonathan Biggins. The production moved to the Everest Theatre at Sydney's Seymour Centre between 5 June and 5 July 1986. It then transferred to Melbourne, playing at the Universal Theatre from 15 July 1986 to 24 August 1986.

Penrith's Q Theatre revived the musical in June 1988 and this production also played at the Riverside Theatres Parramatta's Lennox Theatre.

Virgin Records released a cast recording in 1986.

== Musical numbers ==
Musical numbers taken from the cast recording:

=== Side One ===
- Overture
- "Saigon: R&R" - Toni Allaylis, Jenny Vuletic & Robyne Dunn
- "We Open in Loc Ninh" - Valerie Bader
- "What a Wonderful War" - Terry Serio
- "The Tripping Song" - Terry Serio
- "Crazy Asian War" - Toni Allaylis & Terry Serio
- "Blood on My Hands" - Terry Serio
- "Psychedelic Love Child" - Jenny Vuletic
- "The Letter" - Jonathan Biggins

=== Side Two ===
- "Centennial Park" - Dennis Watkins
- "Into the Heart of Darkness" - Jonathan Biggins
- "Viet Conga" - Mark Daly, Robyne Dunn & Cast
- "Pearls Before Swine" - Dennis Watkins
- "Perfect World" - Terry Serio & Toni Allaylis
- "I'll Be There" - Valerie Bader
- "Vietnam Veteran" - The Cast
- "What a Thrill" - Dennis Watkins & Cast

== Reception ==
Critical reaction was highly positive. The Sydney Morning Herald called Pearls Before Swine "a highly subversive, thoroughly entertaining, flawlessly constructed piece of propaganda that is beautifully directed by Geoffrey Rush". The Age said that the musical "bounces along with tremendous verve and gusto, pillaging and plundering and laying siege to good taste" and "if it's not a smash hit with Melbourne audiences, I'll be surprised".
