= Toni Collette =

Australian actress and singer (born 1972)

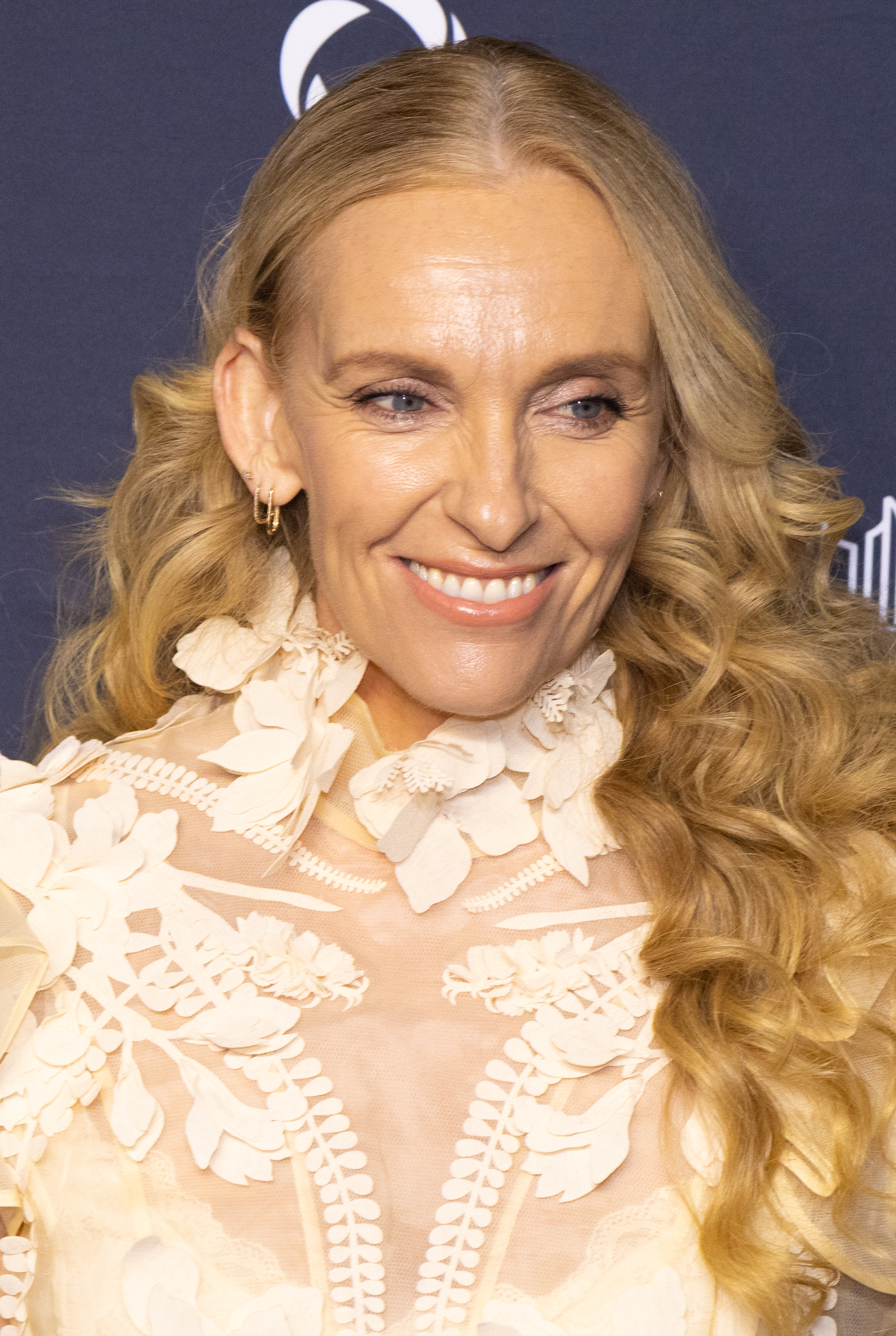
- Collette in 2025
- Born: Toni Collett; 1 November 1972 (age 54); Sydney, New South Wales, Australia
- Other name: Toni Collette-Galafassi
- Education: National Institute of Dramatic Art (attended)
- Occupations: Actress; singer-songwriter
- Years active: 1990–present
- Works: Full list
- Spouse: Dave Galafassi (m. 2003; sep. 2022)
- Children: 2
- Awards: Full list

Toni Collette (born Toni Collett; 1 November 1972) is an Australian actress. Primarily known for her portrayals of troubled and multi-faceted women, she is known for starring in primetime television, independent films and blockbusters. She has received various accolades including five AACTA Awards, a Golden Globe Award, and a Primetime Emmy Award, in addition to nominations for an Academy Award, two British Academy Film Awards and a Tony Award.

Collette made her film debut in the 1992 film Spotswood. Her breakthrough came playing a socially awkward romantic lead in Muriel's Wedding (1994), which earned her a nomination for the Golden Globe for Best Actress. After appearing in Emma (1996) and Velvet Goldmine (1998), she was nominated for the Academy Award for Best Supporting Actress for playing a grieving mother in the thriller The Sixth Sense (1999). She was twice nominated for the BAFTA Award for Best Supporting Actress for her performances as troubled women in the romantic drama About a Boy (2002) and the tragicomedy Little Miss Sunshine (2006). She has also acted in The Hours (2002), Japanese Story (2003), In Her Shoes (2005), Mary and Max (2009), The Way, Way Back (2013), Hereditary (2018), Knives Out (2019), I'm Thinking of Ending Things (2020), Nightmare Alley (2021), Juror No. 2 (2024), and Mickey 17 (2025).

On television, Collette starred as a suburban mother with dissociative identity disorder in the Showtime comedy-drama series United States of Tara (2008–2011), earning the Primetime Emmy Award for Outstanding Lead Actress in a Comedy Series. She was later Emmy-nominated for playing a police detective in the Netflix miniseries Unbelievable (2019) and Kathleen Peterson in the Max miniseries The Staircase (2022). She starred as the founder of a reform academy for troubled teens in the Netflix limited series Wayward (2025). On stage, she made her Broadway debut playing a vaudeville dancer in the musical The Wild Party (2000), for which she earned a Tony Award for Best Actress in a Musical nomination. She returned to Broadway in the play The Realistic Joneses (2014).

As the lead singer of Toni Collette & the Finish, Collette wrote all 11 tracks of their sole album, Beautiful Awkward Pictures (2006). The band toured Australia but have not performed nor released any new material since 2007. She co-founded the film production company Vocab Films in 2017.

== Early life and education ==
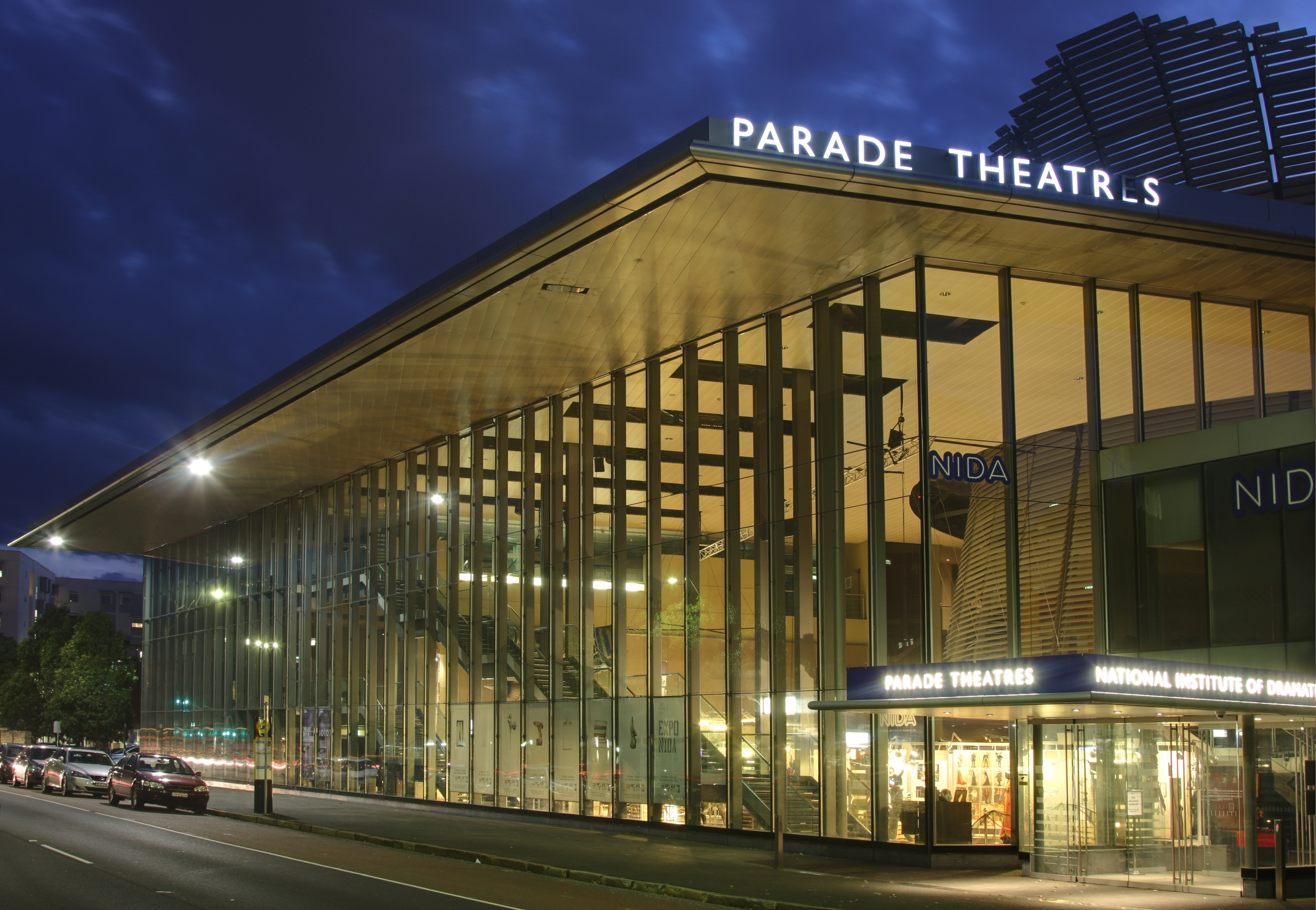
The National Institute of Dramatic Art (NIDA) in Kensington, New South Wales, where Collette studied acting

Collette is the eldest of three children, having two younger brothers. She was raised in the Sydney suburb of Glebe until the age of six, then in Blacktown, New South Wales. Her father, Bob Collett, was a truck driver, and her mother, Judith Ann "Judy" (née Cook) was a customer-service representative. Collette later learned on an episode of Who Do You Think You Are? that Bob was possibly born as a result of his mother Norma's (née McWhinney) having an extramarital affair with a US Navy chief petty officer stationed in Australia during and after World War II. Norma and her husband (Harold "Stanley" Collett) were going through a divorce, and Bob's DNA test determined that Stanley was not his biological father. Despite a public appeal in August 2015, her biological grandfather's name is not known.

Collette has described her family as "[not] the most communicative" but has said that despite her parents' lack of money, they were supportive and made their children feel cared for. She has fond memories of growing up in Blacktown, where she and her mother watched Saturday afternoon movie matinees presented by Bill Collins. She described her younger self as having "crazy" amounts of confidence. When she was 11, she believed she had appendicitis and convinced her doctors: She was taken to an emergency department and had the appendix removed. As a student at Blacktown Girls High School, her favourite activities included netball, tap dancing and swimming, and she took part in local singing competitions. Her ambition was to perform in musicals, as she loved to sing and dance.

Collette's first acting role was a high school performance of Godspell at the age of 14; she auditioned by singing Whitney Houston's "Saving All My Love for You". She decided to become an actor the following year, and was influenced by Geoffrey Rush's stage performance in The Diary of a Madman (July–August 1989). In 1989, with her parents' approval, she transferred to the Australian Theatre for Young People, later explaining, "I was 16. And it's not like I wasn't good at school, or I didn't enjoy it, I did. I just loved acting more. I don't regret that decision, but I can't believe I made it." The actor returned the extra "e" at the end of her surname which Stanley Collett had removed as it sounded better for a stage name. She started at National Institute of Dramatic Art (NIDA) in early 1991, but left after 18 months to appear as Sonya in Uncle Vanya (August–September 1992), directed by Neil Armfield, alongside Rush in the title role.

== Career ==
=== 1990–1999: Early work and breakthrough ===
In late 1988 Collette appeared in Burger Brain - The Fast Food Musical with The Sydney Morning Herald reviewer Bob Evans noting she "sings like a dream". She made her television debut in 1988 on a comedy, variety show Blah Blah Blah as a singer. Her first television acting role was in 1990, a guest appearance as Tracy, on the Seven Network drama series A Country Practice Season 10, Episode 31, "The Sting: Part 1". Her first professional theatre role was as Debbie in Operation Holy Mountain in May of that year at Q Theatre, Penrith. Frank Barnes of Journal of the N.S.W Public School Teachers Federation noticed, "Collette [is] simply amazing in her professional debut as the girl with cerebral palsy." She joined the Sydney Theatre Company and, from December 1990 to February 1991, appeared in A Little Night Music at the Drama Theatre, Sydney Opera House. She performed Cordelia in King Lear (March 1994) and was also in stage productions at the Belvoir Street Theatre, directed by Rush.

In 1992, she made her feature film debut in the ensemble comedy drama Spotswood (known in the US as The Efficiency Expert), which starred Anthony Hopkins and included a then-newcomer Russell Crowe. She played Wendy, a factory worker who harbours a secret attraction towards fellow worker Carey (Ben Mendelsohn). Filmnews' Peter Galvin observed, "it's here that the film finds real warmth, vigour, and pain, all contained in [her] expressive face; she's terrific and so is Mendelsohn simply because we believe them." Andrew Urban of Urban Cinephile felt that, "[she] has a lovely role and does it with minimalist excellence." For the performance, she earned her first AACTA Award nomination, for Best Supporting Actress. Between auditions for roles, she worked part-time delivering pizzas and selling jeans.

In 1992, her agent alerted her to a proposed film project with a good role; a year later Muriel's Wedding (1994) was financed and started casting in June 1993. Although the actor auditioned on the first day, she did not win the role until three months later. In preparation for portraying Muriel, the actor gained 18 kilograms (40 lb) in 7 weeks. James Berardinelli of Reelviews called her "vibrant and energetic", while Peter Stack of the San Francisco Chronicle opined that Collette played the lead role with "disarming earnestness". She received her first Golden Globe Award nomination, for Best Actress and won the AACTA Award for Best Actress.

In 1996, she had parts in three films. In the comedy drama Così, which reunited her with Muriel's Wedding castmate Rachel Griffiths, she played an actor recovering from drug addiction. David Stratton of Variety magazine said Collette "[gave] a terrific performance". In the drama Lilian's Story she played an eccentric woman sent to a mental asylum in her youth. Stratton found her to be "poignant" and took note of her range and depth. She won her second AACTA Award, this time for Best Actress in a Supporting Role. In the period comedy Emma, an adaptation of Jane Austen's novel of the same name, she played Harriet Smith, a close friend of the titular character. Originally dismissive of Austen's works, she found Emma to be "warm and witty and clever". Jane Ganahl of San Francisco Chronicle wrote, "[Harriet was] played with heartbreaking empathy... desperately trying to meet Mr. Right – so awkwardly you fear she'll slip on a banana peel."

She starred alongside Lisa Kudrow, Parker Posey and Alanna Ubach in Clockwatchers (1997) which depicted the lives of four friends working in an office. Dustin Putman of TheFilmFile called it a "jewel of a film" and praised the performances of the cast, particularly Collette whom he referred to as "outstanding". For her supporting role as Michelle in The Boys (1998) she won her third AACTA Award. Although Velvet Goldmine (1998), returned less than half its production budget at the box office, Metacritic reports a 65% score based on 25 critics, indicating "generally favorable reviews". It grew in stature after its release to become a cult film. Collette credited it with revitalising her passion for acting as it had freed her from distress she had been facing. Her next film, 8½ Women (1999) was not as well received: Metacritic gave it a "generally unfavorable" score of 36%.

=== 1999–2004: Rise to prominence and Broadway debut ===
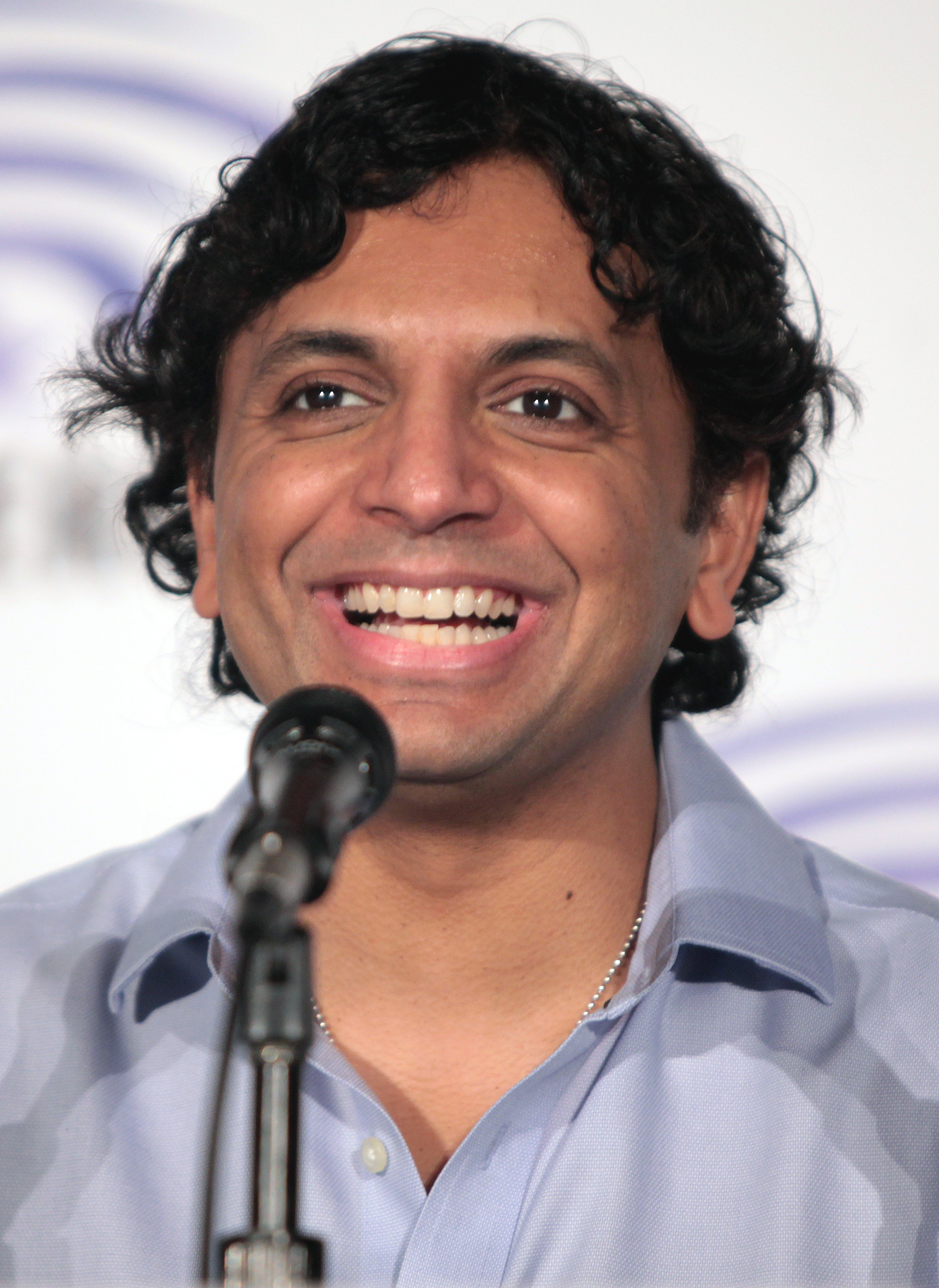
Director M. Night Shyamalan cast Collette in The Sixth Sense (1999), for which she received a nomination for the Academy Award for Best Supporting Actress

When Collette received M. Night Shyamalan's script for The Sixth Sense (1999), she feared it would be a "formulaic Hollywood action drama". However, she was moved by the story and agreed to audition, winning the role over other actors, including Marisa Tomei. She portrayed Lynn Sear, a mother struggling to raise her son Cole (Haley Joel Osment) who communicates with ghosts. Gary Thompson of The Philadelphia Inquirer observed, "the scene in the car when [Cole] divulges his secret is so riveting... and it's so well-acted by Osment and Collette." He added, "she'd become the greatest screen weeper of her generation." The Sixth Sense grossed US$670 million on a budget of US$40 million and became the second-highest-grossing film of 1999. It gathered six Academy Award nominations including Collette's for Best Supporting Actress. She reflected, "There was some definite feeling we all had that it was going to somehow be special. [... It] did really well and has been loved by a lot of people."

In 2000 she made her Broadway debut with a leading role in The Wild Party, playing Queenie, a masochistic showgirl who hosts a lavish party with her husband. Originally written for Vanessa Williams, it went to Collette after the former was unavailable. Charles Isherwood felt under-whelmed by the musical and the actor's performance, "[Collette's] Queenie is flat and one-dimensional; she doesn't convey the warmth that invites emotional investment." Ben Brantley of The New York Times differed, "Ms. Collette... gives the evening's most fully realized performance," but criticised the lack of chemistry with Yancey Arias. She was nominated for the Tony Award for Best Leading Actress in a Musical. Collette turned down the title role in Bridget Jones's Diary due to her Broadway commitments.

She followed with a supporting role in the action thriller Shaft (2000). The film received "mixed or average reviews", and grossed US$107.2 million on a budget of US$46 million. Kam Williams of African American Literature Book Club noticed, "Collette lends the film some convincing and welcome dramatic weight as the frightened, conflicted Diane." However, John Patterson of The Guardian rated it as a "career low" for her. In 2001 she appeared in the HBO TV movie Dinner with Friends and played Beth, a middle-aged woman who struggles with her husband leaving her for another woman. Steven Oxman of Variety said that she was "well suited" to her role, while Bruce Fetts of Entertainment Weekly praised her "flawless" American accent. The show earned a nomination for the Primetime Emmy Award for Outstanding Television Movie.

In 2002 she had a supporting role in The Hours, based on the novel of the same name, playing Kitty, a woman who plans to undergo surgery for her infertility. John Patterson felt she gave an "utterly convincing small-scale emotional meltdown born of suburban sadness and sexual self-repression." The film received positive reviews and was nominated for the Academy Award for Best Picture. In About a Boy (2002) she portrayed a woman with depression who attempts to commit suicide. Daniel Saney of Digital Spy said that she was "as impressive as ever" while Sheila Johnston of Screen Daily praised her "powerful presence". She was nominated for the BAFTA Award for Best Actress in a Supporting Role and won the Boston Society of Film Critics Award for Best Supporting Actress for both 2002 performances.

Collette played the lead role in Japanese Story (2003) as Sandy an Australian geologist who develops an intense relationship with a Japanese businessman. It was screened at the 2003 Cannes Film Festival. The performance led to reviewers welcoming her return to lead roles: the first since Muriel's Wedding. John Patterson wrote that she gave a "shattering performance, masterfully controlled and detailed, and all the proof her fans ever needed of her special brilliance." Richard Porton of the Chicago Reader remarked, "[her] pitch-perfect performance and the stunning evocation of the forbidding and beautiful outback make this film unexpectedly rewarding." Critics praised her emotional range, with some regarding the performance to be the best of her career. She won her fourth AACTA Award statuette for her portrayal of Sandy Edwards in Japanese Story. Her two releases of 2004, The Last Shot and Connie and Carla, were rated as having "mixed or average reviews" by Metacritic.

=== 2005–2011: Supporting roles and television work ===
Collette's only film in 2005, In Her Shoes, was a comedy drama about the relationship between two sisters (Rose and Maggie Feller) and their estranged grandmother, co-starring Cameron Diaz and Shirley MacLaine. Based on the 2002 novel of the same name by Jennifer Weiner, the film received "mixed or average" reviews from critics. She was subsequently nominated for a Satellite Award for Best Actress for her performance of Rose, a successful-but-lonely lawyer with low self-esteem, which Mick LaSalle of the San Francisco Chronicle noticed, "As usual, [her] face is a fine-tuned transmitter of her emotions, moment by moment, and she becomes the locus of audience feeling."

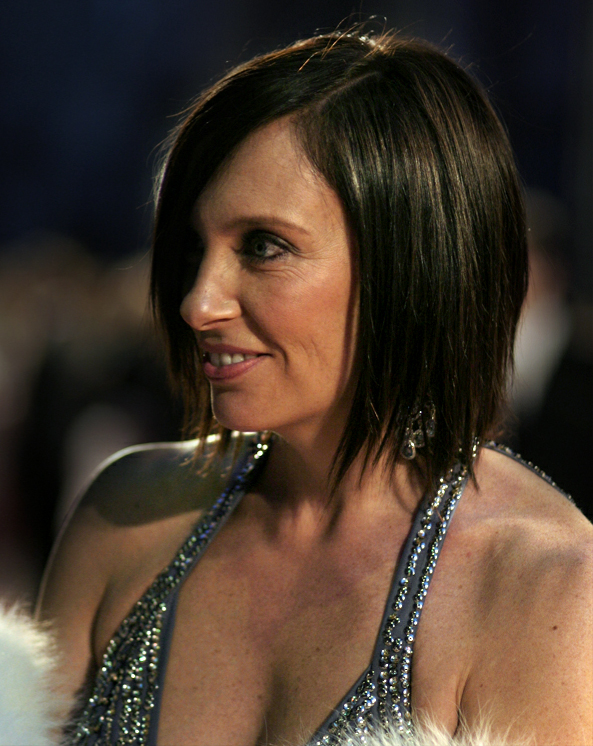
Collette at the 60th British Academy Film Awards in 2007, where she was nominated for the BAFTA Award for Best Actress in a Supporting Role for her performance in Little Miss Sunshine (2006)

In 2006, she starred in Little Miss Sunshine, a comedy drama road movie about a family's trip to a children's beauty pageant. It premiered at the Sundance Film Festival in January of that year, and its distribution rights were bought by Fox Searchlight Pictures for one of the biggest deals in the history of the festival. Sharon Waxman of The New York Times called her "funny and believable", while Stella Papamichael of BBC felt that she was "underused". The film had positive reception, resulting in her second BAFTA and Golden Globe nominations. It grossed US$100.5 million worldwide and became one of the most successful independent films of the mid-2000s. Also in that year the actor took supporting roles in the thrillers The Night Listener and The Dead Girl. The latter was released to "generally favorable" reviews, while The Night Listener was higher earning with a revenue of US$10.5 million.

In her first television engagement in five years, the HBO-BBC joint miniseries Tsunami: The Aftermath (2006), she played an Australian government employee who tries to cope with the events following the 2004 Indian Ocean earthquake and the resulting tsunami in Thailand. The film received mixed reviews from critics. Robert Bianco of USA Today said that it was, "inexcusably tasteless, tone deaf... and dull", and Brian Lowry of Variety remarked that the film, "[grasps] for higher ground that it never reaches." Despite this, praise was given to the performances of the cast. For her role, Collette earned her first Primetime Emmy nomination and third Golden Globe nomination. At a ceremony in August 2006, Collette inducted Helen Reddy into the Australian Recording Industry Association (ARIA) Hall of Fame and described her song, "I Am Woman" (1971) as "timeless".

After working as a juror at the 2007 Cannes Film Festival, she starred in two releases of 2007, Towelhead and Evening. Clint Eastwood has planned to cast Nicholas Hoult & Collette in Juror No. 2. They received "mixed or average reviews". Kelly Vance of East Bay Express, called Towelhead "one of the most intelligent films of the year" and praised the artist's performance. In her review of Evening, Putman called it "flawed in more ways than one" but lauded her for "[enlivening] her scenes with pathos". In 2008 she played a small role in Hey, Hey, It's Esther Blueburger, and also served as an executive producer. Her scenes were shot in a week. The film received tepid reviews and failed to recoup its $6 million budget. Bernadete McNulty, writing for The Daily Telegraph, wrote, "[her] presence may have got this Australian debut from writer/director Cathy Randall off the ground [but] her slight role is insufficient to make it fly the distance." Her other 2008 film, The Black Balloon, was better received, for which she was also co-executive producer. Frank Hatherley of Screen Daily praised the film and her acting, "[she] gives another of her warm, full-blooded portraits" and Roger Ebert venerated her performance as being the heart of the film. She won her fifth AACTA Award for the role of Maggie Mollison in The Black Balloon.

In 2008, Collette accepted the leading role in the Showtime TV comedy-drama series, United States of Tara. Created by Steven Spielberg and Diablo Cody, it revolves around Tara Gregson, a wife and mother of two, who has dissociative identity disorder, and is coping with alternate personalities. She was given the leading role by Spielberg without auditioning. In the role, she portrayed multiple characters and found that it required more preparation than she normally did. However, after she understood the characters better, she found it easier to play them. The show was originally planned for a twelve-episode season, but was renewed for a second and third season after it gave the network its highest ratings since 2004. The series and her performance received generally favorable reviews. Tim Goodman of the San Francisco Chronicle called her a "tour de force", and Ariana Bacle of Entertainment Weekly praised the actor's "flawless" transition between personalities that felt so "insanely distinct" that they could have each been a different actor. Collette won both the Primetime Emmy Award for Outstanding Lead Actress in a Comedy Series and the Golden Globe for Best Actress in a TV Comedy in 2009 and was nominated for both again in the following year. Also in 2009, she provided voice acting as Mary in the animated film Mary and Max.

Collette was originally set to star in 2009's Away We Go, but dropped out due to scheduling conflicts. She then starred as a single mother of a precocious child in Jesus Henry Christ (2011). The film received "mixed or average reviews"; James Plath of Movie Metropolis called her "terrific" but John DeFore of The Hollywood Reporter felt that she was severely underutilised. She later had a supporting role in the horror-comedy Fright Night (2011). The film reunited her with filmmaker Craig Gillespie who had directed her in several episodes of United States of Tara. Debbie Lynn Elias of Behind the Lens called her "pitchfork perfect" while Emmet Asher-Perrin of Tor.com said that she was "charming as always". The film received "generally favorable reviews".

=== 2012–2017: Independent films and Broadway return ===
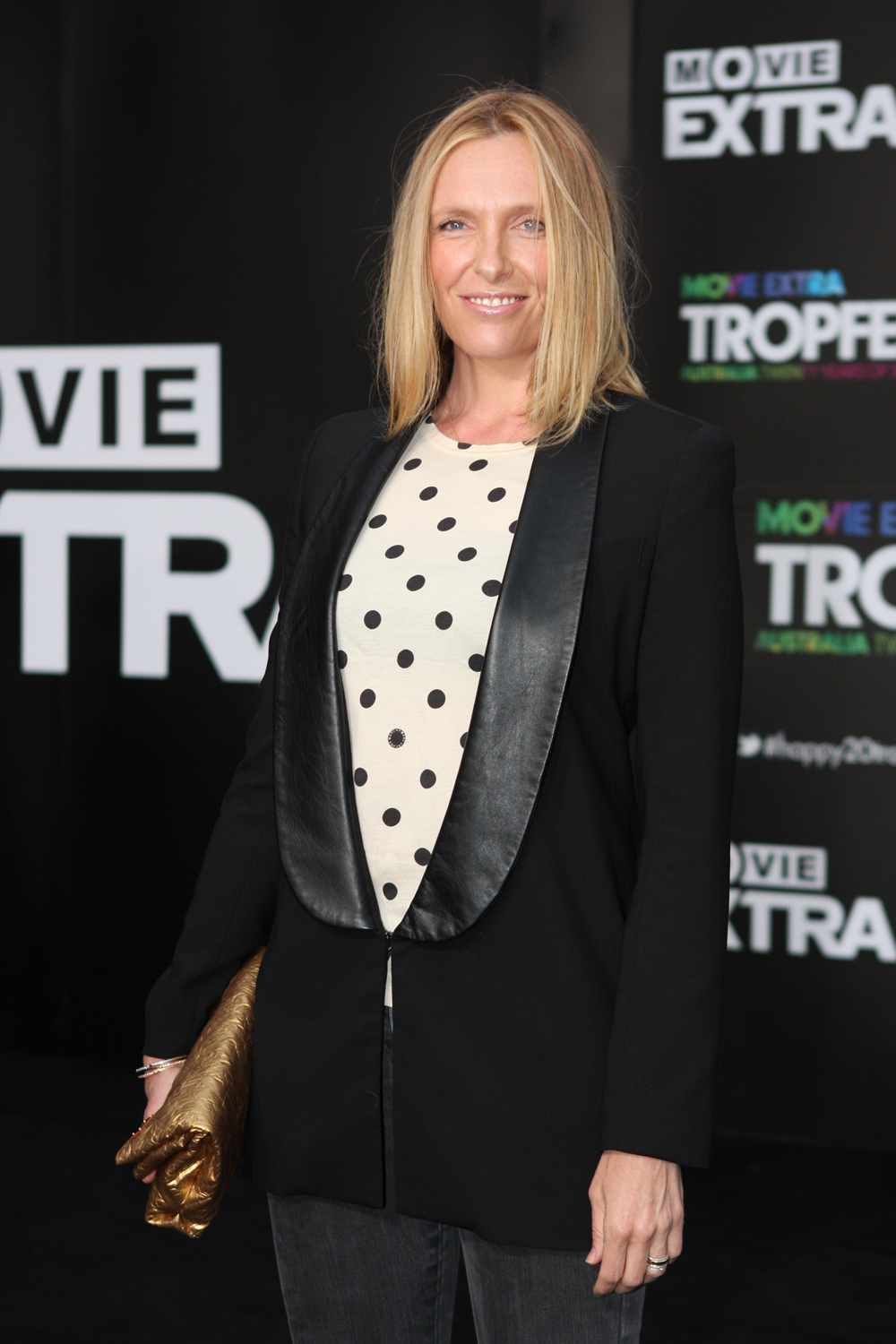
Collette at the Short Film Festival in Sydney, Australia in 2012

Collette's first release of 2012 was the independent comedy drama Mental. She played Shaz, a hitchhiker who is hired as a nanny to take care of five mentally ill sisters. Despite giving the film a negative review, Gary Goldstein of the Los Angeles Times said that the actor "rips into her woolly role as if channeling a leftover personality from her United States of Tara days." Luke Buckmaster of Crikey called her "charismatic and all-inhabiting". She received her third AACTA Best Actress nomination for the role. Later in the year, she played Peggy, a supporting role in the biographical drama, Hitchcock. Deborah Ross, writing for The Spectator, provided an unenthusiastic review and wrote, "[Hitchcock] wastes many of its cast members - particularly Toni Collette."

In 2013, Collette was seen in the independent film The Way, Way Back, opposite Steve Carell and Sam Rockwell, and in Enough Said, with Julia Louis-Dreyfus and James Gandolfini. For The Way, Way Back, she received positive reviews: Andrew O'Hehir of Salon magazine praised her "brilliant, understated performance;" Peter Travers of Rolling Stone noticed her star quality; Berardinelli described her adaptability and said that she gives a performance far and above what the role required. Her performance in Enough Said was also well received; Katie Smith-Wong of FlickFeast praised her for bringing humour to the film but Joseph Walsh of CinVue said that she was underused. Later that year, Collette starred in the CBS TV drama, Hostages, which received reviews that were generally favourable, but weak ratings. RedEye's Curt Wagner was fascinated by her performance, while Verne Gay of Newsday felt she was "superb", and USA Today's Bianco as "nuanced" and "grounded". The series aired for fifteen episodes and, due to a combination of low ratings and a closed narrative, did not return for a second season.

In the comedy drama Lucky Them (2013), which debuted at the Toronto International Film Festival, Collette portrayed Ellie Klug, a music critic assigned to write about a disappeared musician and childhood sweetheart, and tasked herself to track him down. She took on the role because she felt the script had a realistic and in-depth approach to topics like self-sufficiency and self-realization. She later said that, out of all the roles she had played, Ellie resembled her the most. The film earned "generally favorable reviews", with praise for her performance. David Rooney of The Hollywood Reporter wrote that it was "centered by smart, soulful work by the wonderful Toni Collette" and that she played her character "with warmth, realness and emotional transparency that make you stay with her even when she's pushing people away." The film also screened at the Tribeca Film Festival, where Joe Bendel of Libertas Film Magazine ranked her performance as the fourth-best of the festival. Upon release, Mike D'Angelo of The Dissolve wrote that she "is capable of anything".

After a 14-year absence, Collette returned to Broadway in 2014, starring as Jennifer Jones in Will Eno's play The Realistic Joneses alongside co-stars Marisa Tomei, Michael C. Hall, and Tracy Letts. The play examines a couple who project their insecurities and fears onto their next-door neighbours with the same last name. The play opened to positive reviews, with the actor and the entire cast earning high praise. Charles Isherwood from The New York Times wrote that "Ms. Collette exudes a touching, exasperated dignity as Jennifer." Variety's Marilyn Stasio called her work "terribly funny", while Rooney of The Hollywood Reporter claimed, "Collette, whose naturalness can cut through even the very deliberate theatrical artifice of Eno's dialogue and scene construction, anchors the play with her somber restraint and deadpan delivery." The artist and her co-stars won a Drama Desk Special Award for Best Ensemble Performance.

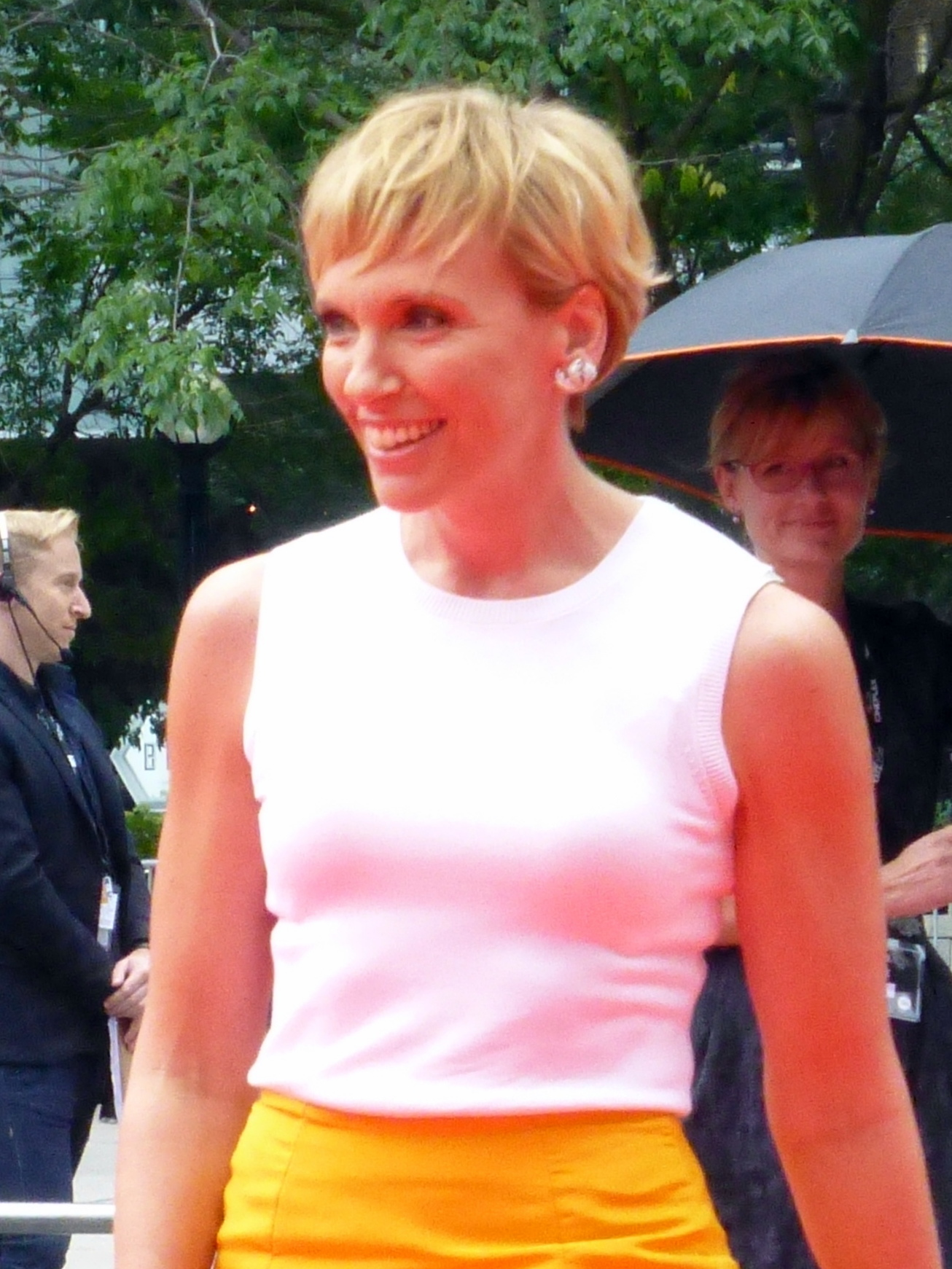
Collette attending the premiere of Miss You Already at the 2015 Toronto International Film Festival

In 2014, Collette appeared in three comedy films, Tammy, A Long Way Down and Hector and the Search for Happiness. All three are rated as having "generally unfavorable reviews" by Metacritic. Also in that year she provided the voice to Lady Portley-Rind in the animation The Boxtrolls. She starred as Milly, opposite Drew Barrymore as Jess, in the comedy drama Miss You Already (2015), about two women whose friendship is tested when Jess starts a family while Milly falls ill. It premiered at the Toronto International Film Festival, and Metacritic rated it at 59% indicating "mixed or average reviews". Billy Goodykoontz of The Arizona Republic asserted that "[her] work is so compulsively watchable that Miss You Already is worth a watch for that reason alone." Collette then played the matriarch of a dysfunctional family in the horror film Krampus (also 2015). Her sole release of 2016 was the crime thriller Imperium, opposite Daniel Radcliffe, she portrayed Angela Zamparo, an FBI analyst targeting a white supremacist group. Despite its limited release, the film garnered positive reviews, with Gary Goldstein of the Los Angeles Times calling it "impressively dimensional...tense, gripping and disturbing," and found her to be "excellent" as Radcliffe's character's supervisor.

In 2017, Collette appeared in several films: to varying degrees of success. The action film, XXX: Return of Xander Cage, starring Vin Diesel, was a commercial success, grossing $346.1 million and earned mixed reviews, though Mick LaSalle of the San Francisco Chronicle praised her for "embrac[ing] the cold-blooded extremes of her role" as a CIA operative. Her next two films, the war drama The Yellow Birds and the comedy Fun Mom Dinner, premiered at the Sundance Film Festival. Although both of these gathered "mixed or average reviews", the actor's work was appreciated, particularly in the former, with the Los Angeles Times critic taking note of how she, and co-star Jennifer Aniston, "deliver uniformly naturalistic performances." She was also in the action-thriller Unlocked, and the comedies Madame and Please Stand By, all of which received "mixed or average reviews" according to Metacritic. The mystery drama Jasper Jones (2017) was better received—obtaining 77% at Rotten Tomatoes. Sandra Hall of The Sydney Morning Herald praised her emotional range and James Douglas, writing for The Guardian, said that she was "impossibly vivacious as always". Richard Kuipers of Variety eulogized the artist's climactic monologue in which her character laments her discontent, calling her "positively electrifying".

Also in that year, she formed the production company Vocab Films, with her US-based talent manager Jen Turner. She had previously worked as executive producer for the films she appeared in, Like Minds (2006), The Black Balloon, and Hey, Hey, It's Esther Blueburger (both 2008). Vocab Film's first project is The Best of Adam Sharp (2016), a novel by fellow Australian, Graeme Simsion. Collette is set to play the female lead role, Angelina Brown, who is described by Anita Busch of Deadline as, "an intelligent and strong-willed woman... who taught [Adam] what it meant to find—and then lose—love." Another project is Julia Dahl's novel, Invisible City, a co-production with RadicalMedia, for a TV murder mystery with the actor also serving as a script writer for the pilot episode. She explained her motivation, "it's about fighting for personal freedom and living an authentic life. It couldn't be a more relevant time to tell this story about acceptance and integration, or lack thereof. These complex female characters are honest, flawed, and inspiring. We can always use more of those."

=== 2018–present: Mainstream films and continued praise ===
In 2018, Collette starred in the horror film Hereditary, playing Annie Graham, the matriarch of a family haunted by the supernatural following the death of her mother. She was initially reluctant to take on the role, but became convinced by the script's grounded approach and its exploration of grief and loss. She considered it to be the most difficult of her career: in an interview with Vulture's Rachel Handler she reflected, "There was no easy moment in this movie... I was shooting 14-take scenes, talking about great loss and difficulty in relating to my family." The film premiered at the Sundance Film Festival and became A24's highest-grossing film, earning US$80.2 million Chris Nashawaty of Entertainment Weekly praised her for "real dramatic power and force", while Michael Phillips of the Chicago Tribune complimented her "fierce performance with a human pulse". She won the Gotham Independent Film Award for Best Actress and was nominated for the AACTA, Critics' Choice and Independent Spirit Awards in that category for her performance.

She starred in Wanderlust (2018), a BBC One drama series about the troubled relationship between Collette's character, Joy Richards, a therapist, and her husband. It was her first lead role in TV series since Hostages. She also served as an associate producer on the series. Ben Travers of IndieWire wrote "[she guides] the [series] through turbulent emotional seas with assurance" and Jen Chaney of Vulture remarked that the show was worth watching solely for her performance. Also that year, she appeared in the comedy Hearts Beat Loud, which also premiered at Sundance. Peter Bradshaw called it "a likable heartwarmer" and praised the actor for "[giving the] film some sinew in her supporting role."

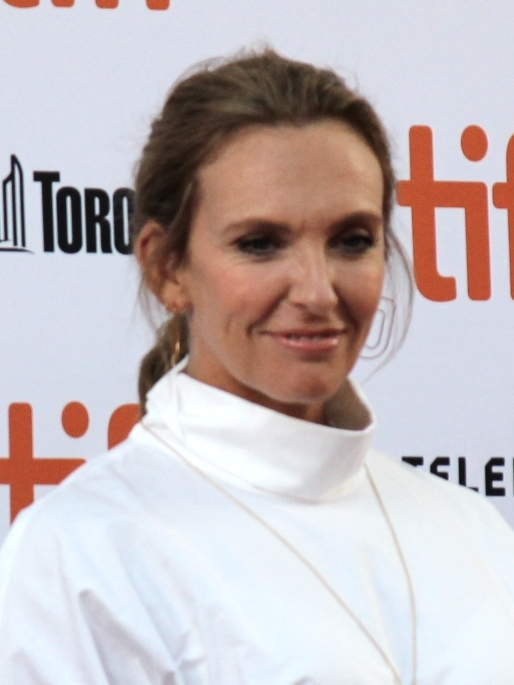
Collette attending the premiere of Knives Out at the 2019 Toronto International Film Festival

That following year, Collette returned to the horror genre in Dan Gilroy's Velvet Buzzsaw (2019), alongside Jake Gyllenhaal and Rene Russo. Partly a satire about the art world, it premiered at the Sundance Film Festival to polarising reactions. Chicago Sun-Times' Richard Roeper gave it a positive review, "[she is] as good as we'd expect [her] to be." She played a supporting role as Joni Thrombey in Rian Johnson's mystery thriller Knives Out, alongside an ensemble cast including Daniel Craig, Ana de Armas, Jamie Lee Curtis, Michael Shannon, and Christopher Plummer. It premiered at the Toronto International Film Festival and was a commercial success, grossing US$311.3 million. Critics highlighted the performances of the cast: Joe Morgenstern wrote that Collette "nails her character's style with elan" and David Rooney considered her to be "divine as a deeply sincere phony".

In 2019, Collette took on the role of a police detective, Grace Rasmussen, investigating a troubling rape case, with Merritt Wever and Kaitlyn Dever, in the Netflix miniseries Unbelievable. She had accepted it prior to reading the script, finding the topic "important and so meaningful". It had been seen by over 32 million people making it one of Netflix's highest viewed TV series. Several critics praised her chemistry with Wever: Jen Chaney of New York wrote, "Wever and Collette both create fully authentic women who ooze integrity but also have enough insecurities and make enough mistakes to seem like actual human beings". For her performance, she received nominations for a Golden Globe Award and a Primetime Emmy Award, and won the Critics' Choice Television Award for Best Supporting Actress in a Movie/Miniseries.

In 2020, she took on a leading role in the drama film Dream Horse, playing a middle-aged South Wales native who decides to train a racehorse. Dennis Harvey of Variety praised her for "easily [carrying] the film's emotional weight." She appeared in Charlie Kaufman's psychological thriller film I'm Thinking of Ending Things, which was released on Netflix in September 2020. In 2021, she had lead roles in the science fiction thriller film Stowaway, and Guillermo del Toro's neo-noir thriller film Nightmare Alley. She starred in the Netflix thriller series Pieces of Her (March 2022) and played Kathleen Peterson in the HBO Max limited series The Staircase, the later of which earned her a nomination for the Primetime Emmy Award for Outstanding Lead Actress in a Limited or Anthology Series or Movie. In 2023, she produced and acted in the action comedy Mafia Mamma. The following year she played an aggressive prosecutor during a murder trial in Clint Eastwood's legal thriller Juror No. 2 (2024). In 2024 she played a devious wife to an egotistical politician played by Mark Ruffalo in Bong Joon-ho's dystopian science-fiction comedy Mickey 17 (2025). She is set to star opposite Andy Garcia in the romantic comedy Under the Stars directed by Michelle Danner.

In 2025, Collette starred in the Netflix limited series Wayward (2025), portraying Evelyn Wade, the founder and leader of a reform academy for troubled teens. In June 2026, she joined Joseph Gordon-Levitt's Netflix film 2034, his first feature film as director since Don Jon (2013).

== Other ventures ==
=== Music ===
Despite cherishing music and singing at a young age, Collette had stopped in the mid-1990s and explained, "[Singing] comes from a very personal place. It's your voice... and it's only in the last couple of years I felt comfortable in myself singing." In 1996 she sang three cover versions for the soundtrack of the film, Cosi: "Don't Dream It's Over" (originally by Crowded House), "Stand By Me" (Ben E. King) and "Throw Your Arms Around Me" (Hunters & Collectors). In 2000 she recorded nine tracks for the cast album, The Wild Party, for the eponymous Broadway musical. Elyse Sommer of CurtainUp, in a review of the musical, wrote that she was a "topnotch singer" and particularly praised her rendition of "People Like Us". For the soundtrack of Connie and Carla (2004), Collette, and her co-star Nia Vardalos, recorded duets of several show tunes including, "I'm Gonna Wash That Man Right Outa My Hair", "Maybe This Time" and "Cabaret". David Haviland of Eye for Film praised the renditions, "The musical numbers are a camp triumph." She sang the track, "Sunday Morning", for the album Summertown by Deborah Conway and Willy Zygier. She has also performed songs for soundtracks of About a Boy, A Long Way Down, Miss You Already and Hearts Beat Loud.

Collette has been writing her own songs since her early teens. In 2006 with encouragement of her husband Dave Galafassi on drums (ex-Gelbison), she formed Toni Collette & the Finish in Sydney. Also joining the band were Amanda Brown on keyboards, Glenn Richards on guitar, David Lane on piano and keyboards and Pete Farley on bass guitar. Their first gig was at The Basement, Sydney, "I was completely petrified and I think once I got that out of the way, I have just been enjoying it... In the acting, the film world, they try to hide things from actors, keep them cushioned. So I am really enjoying getting my hands dirty."

On 9 October 2006 the band released their debut album, Beautiful Awkward Pictures, on Hoola Hoop Records. Using her personal life as an inspiration, she wrote all eleven tracks under her married name, Toni Collette-Galafassi. It was recorded in two weeks: Collette co-produced with Zygier. Eclectic of Sputnikmusic gave it a positive review, "Collette's subdued vocals aren't perfect, but they're close enough to love all the same." He did, however, rebuke the lyrics of some tracks remarking that they had "some stunningly bad lines". The album produced two singles, "Beautiful Awkward Pictures" (September 2006) and "Look Up" (March 2007). The latter reached the ARIA Singles Chart top 100. In July 2007 Toni Collette & the Finish headlined the Sydney show of Live Earth, singing a cover of T. Rex's "Children of the Revolution". They toured Australia, but have not performed nor released any new material after 2007. She expressed her desire to make another album in 2012, but said she found it difficult to find enough time to commit to that project.

=== Philanthropy ===
Collette supports various charities including Doctors Without Borders, Amnesty International and Feeding America. She expressed her support for PETA and, in July 2005, wrote a letter to then Australian Prime Minister John Howard, asking him to ban the practice of mulesing and the live export of sheep. Later that month, after speaking to sheep farmers, she reneged on supporting PETA's campaign against mulesing: "The issue is not as black and white as was previously presented to me. I was given to understand that there were 'effective and humane alternatives to prevent fly strike' and they are 'currently available'. I am now aware that there are no simple alternatives available to farmers at this time."

In 2009, the actor auctioned off T-shirts of her own design to raise money for various charities. Collette along with Drew Barrymore and Catherine Hardwicke, who all worked together on Miss You Already, wore pink ribbons to support Breast Cancer Awareness Month in October 2014. She has raised money for OzHarvest, an organisation which collects excess food from Australian restaurants and redistributes it to the homeless. She sold some of her personal items for an auction to raise money for the charity Cure Our Kids, which is dedicated to raising money for the oncology unit at The Children's Hospital at Westmead.

In 2010, she was part of the host committee to hold the third annual Go Go Gala which will benefit the GO Campaign which seeks to help orphans and vulnerable children throughout the world. She took part in the promotion of the documentary The Lazarus Effect (2010), being featured in a small clip which sought to raise awareness of the positive impact of free antiretroviral drug therapy for those living with HIV in Africa. In 2012, Collette has contributed an exclusive blog on the fight against hunger and a call to action for Giving Tuesday and the holiday season to the Huffington Post.

In 2014, she was appointed as a global ambassador for Concern Worldwide. She made her first field visit with Concern to Haiti where she met families who, together with Concern, are working to break the cycle of extreme poverty. She had previously raised money for Concern's global campaign to fight hunger and malnutrition. She has taken part in multiple Public Service Announcements by Concern requesting the viewers to donate to Concern's various campaigns. In 2017, she attended the 25th Annual Elton John AIDS Foundation Academy Award Party which seeks to raise money to support innovative HIV prevention, education programs and direct care and support services to people living with HIV. She has expressed her support for the Me Too movement.

== Artistry and public image ==
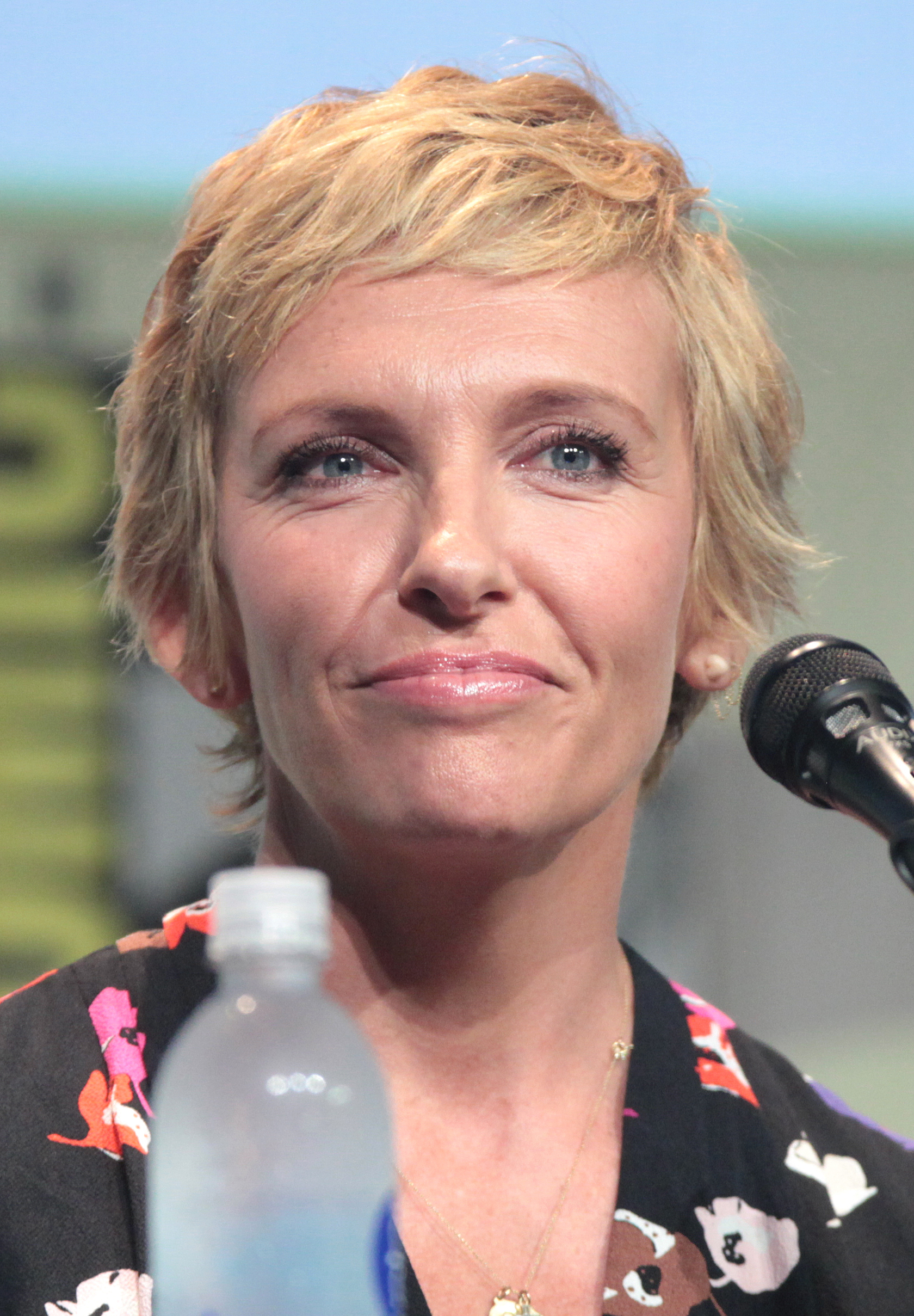
Collette at the 2015 San Diego Comic-Con

Collette is described by Toby Creswell and Samantha Trenoweth in their book, 1001 Australians You Should Know (2006): "she proved her abilities as a serious actress in Rowan Woods' 1998 film The Boys and again in the big budget international hits The Sixth Sense and About a Boy." Sharon Waxman of The New York Times wrote that the artist often embraces characters who are pathetic, insecure or otherwise unattractive. However, the actor said she detests playing such characters, "If I keep perpetuating that image of myself – that of a downtrodden person – that's the only roles I'll get. And I'm getting tired of playing those roles." Despite achieving stardom early in her career with The Sixth Sense, she rarely acted in commerce-driven pictures. She prefers working in independent films over blockbusters where the latter prioritize box-office success over telling a story. Several journalists noted her gravitation towards playing dissatisfied and slightly neurotic mothers. When asked about being typecast in such roles, Collette replied, "All people are different. All women are different. A lot of women haven't had children but it doesn't change the fact that they're individuals and have some kind of individuality and spark about them."

Collette listed Geoffrey Rush as one of her influences and remembered seeing him in The Diary of a Madman (1989): "When I watched him in that, it was like being in church, I had a full-on spiritual awakening. I even wrote him this letter – I don't remember what it said, but it was very complimentary." She does not find it difficult to detach herself from her roles, but reflected that after doing several heavy thematic films she, "[started] to find things were accumulating. I had to figure out a way to kind of shake it off. So I am figuring that out." When asked how she decides to play her characters, she replied, "When I look at a character, I never look at the size of the role. I always look at the whole person, no matter how much they're featured in the movie." She dislikes working with dialect coaches when preparing for an accent, as they usually make her feel self-conscious. Although she has gained weight to play characters in previous films, she dislikes doing so, and after filming In Her Shoes, said that she would never do so again. Brie Larson, who starred with Collette in United States of Tara, has cited her as an inspiration and praised her for being able to "disappear" into her roles. Greg Kinnear, her co-star in Dinner with Friends and Little Miss Sunshine, called her "gifted" and commended her for being able to communicate without dialogue.

"I try to put myself in the position of the character and feel things as holistically as I can. It's an exhausting way to do it. I'm not [going to] recommend it to anybody, but that's the only way I know how to do it."

— Collette on her acting style

In an analysis of Collette's acting style, Rilla Kingston compared her to character actress Thelma Ritter who was widely praised for her supporting roles, and repeatedly typecast as the female comic second. Kingston took note of her use of physicality to convey her characters' emotions as in Emma and United States of Tara. She remarked that Collette's acting method references the components of Stanislavski's System of Acting. In studying her typecasting as mothers, Kingston wrote, "[Collette] selectively chooses roles of women and mothers which she can portray in ways that are multidimensional and different from another." She also wrote that the actor makes conscious efforts to break from the typecasting, with leading roles in films like Miss You Already and Lucky Them. At the end of her analysis, Kingston concluded, "Collette truly is a chameleon in both the versatility of her acting style and in the kind of roles she is willing to approach with a physicality-based method." Her performance in Hereditary has also been cited as an inspiration by Inde Navarrette for her role as Nikki in the 2025 feature film Obsession.

== Personal life ==
=== Relationships ===
Collette dated her Velvet Goldmine co-star Jonathan Rhys Meyers for about a year circa 1997 before ending their relationship, and has called it "hedonistic, drunken and probably dangerous". She met musician Dave Galafassi at a 2002 album launch for his then-band Gelbison. The couple married in a traditional Buddhist ceremony on 11 January 2003. They have two children. Collette has said that she is an avid camper and enjoys meditating. They lived in Sydney in the 2000s before moving to Los Angeles. They returned to Sydney in 2019. On 7 December 2022, Collette announced that she and Galafassi were divorcing.

=== Health ===
In her twenties, Collette found it difficult to adapt to fame and as a result struggled with bulimia and panic attacks. The panic attacks lasted eight months, during which she described having pains in her chest, blurred vision and profuse sweating. During this period she travelled extensively, shaved her head five times (once for a film role) and bought a flat in Brixton, London. Her aim was to "explore different ideas and just look at life and try to understand it." She left the Brixton flat after a few months because she saw a man "getting his head bashed in with a pole 30 metres away".

== Discography ==
With Toni Collette & the Finish

- Toni Collette & the Finish: Beautiful Awkward Pictures (2006) – Hoola Hoop Records/MGM (HOOLAHOOP002)

Other appearances

- "Best Friend", "Finale: The Wild Party", "People Like Us" (by Toni Collette and Yancey Arias), "Queenie Was a Blonde", "This Is What It Is", "Welcome to My Party", "Wild Party" from The Wild Party: A Decca Original Broadway Cast Album (soundtrack album, 2000) – Decca Broadway/Universal Music Group (012 159 003–2)
- "Airport Medley: Oklahoma / Superstar / Papa Can You Hear Me? / Memory", "Let Me Entertain You", "Maybe This Time", "Don't Rain on My Parade", "Medley: Everything's Alright / Don't Cry for Me", "I'm Gonna Wash That Man Right Outa My Hair", "There Is Nothing Like a Dame", "Cabaret" (all by Nia Vardalos and Toni Collette) from Connie and Carla: Music from the Motion Picture (2004) Epic Records (5178262000, EK 92430)
- "Hello Halo (Cooper Todd Remix)" (by David Galafassi, Toni Collette, Nathan Cooper, Benjamin Todd) from Miss You Already (Original Motion Picture Soundtrack) (2015) – Sony Classical

== Credits and accolades ==
Among her numerous accolades, Collette received five AACTA Awards from eight nominations, a Golden Globe Award from six nominations, a Primetime Emmy Award from four nominations, and a Screen Actors Guild Award from four nominations. She also received nominations for two BAFTA Awards and the Academy Award for Best Supporting Actress.

For her performance in Muriel's Wedding (1994), Collette received her first Golden Globe Award nomination. For her role in The Sixth Sense (1999), she was nominated for the Academy Award for Best Supporting Actress. She went on to earn BAFTA Award nominations for About a Boy (2002) and Little Miss Sunshine (2006). For the comedy-drama series United States of Tara (2008–2011), Collette earned a Primetime Emmy Award and a Golden Globe Award. Her work in the miniseries Unbelievable (2019) led her to a Critics' Choice Television Award win, and garnered further Golden Globe Award and Primetime Emmy Award nominations.

== See also ==
- List of Australian film actors
