= Donald Shanks (bass-baritone) =

Donald Robert Shanks AO OBE (5 July 1940 – 8 April 2011) was an Australian bass-baritone singer who sang over 65 principal roles with Opera Australia and other companies in Australia and overseas. Moffatt Oxenbould said that he had "an immensely important place in the history of opera in this country".

== Career ==
Donald Shanks was born in Brisbane, Queensland, and started singing in Methodist church choirs. He went to the prestigious Brisbane State High School. His first experience of a staged work was Gilbert and Sullivan's The Mikado, the opera with which he also chose to end his career in 2004.

He joined the Elizabethan Theatre Trust Opera Company (as Opera Australia was then known) in 1964, aged 23. Over the years, he built a reputation as one of the most versatile figures in Australian opera, performing in all the major comic roles, from the title role in Don Pasquale and Bartolo in The Marriage of Figaro, to The Italian Girl in Algiers to bel canto roles such as Lucia di Lammermoor and Norma, to the key dramatic roles, particularly in Wagner heavyweights such as Tannhäuser, Lohengrin, Die Meistersinger von Nürnberg (singing the bass role of Pogner) and Tristan und Isolde. He sang in Lucia di Lammermoor, Il trovatore and Norma with Dame Joan Sutherland, La bohème with Luciano Pavarotti, and Banquo in Macbeth with Sherrill Milnes.

Other roles he became associated with were Zaccharia in Nabucco, Rocco in Fidelio, Osmin in The Abduction from the Seraglio, Boris in Boris Godunov, Timur in Turandot, Ramphis in Aida, Pistol in Falstaff, Kekal in The Bartered Bride, Baron Ochs in Der Rosenkavalier, Nourabad in The Pearl Fishers, the Commendatore in Don Giovanni, and a major role in Leoš Janáček's The Cunning Little Vixen. He created the role of The Maestro in Alan John's 1995 opera The Eighth Wonder at the Sydney Opera House.

He also performed regularly with the Lyric Opera of Queensland and the Victoria State Opera, as well as opera companies overseas including The Royal Opera, Covent Garden, the Paris Opera (1976–77) and the Canadian Opera (1983–86).

== Honours ==
Donald Shanks was made an Officer (OBE) of the Order of the British Empire in the 1977 New Year Honours, and an Officer (AO) of the Order of Australia in the 1987 Australia Day Honours.

He died on 8 April 2011 at his home in Frenchs Forest, aged 70, of a heart attack; his memorial service was held in St Andrew's Anglican Church, Roseville. He is survived by his wife Pamela, née Moffatt, whom he married in 1964; two sons Murray and Jonathan, both Baptist ministers; and eight grandchildren.
