= The Eighth Wonder =

1995 opera by Alan John and Dennis Watkins

- Opera by Alan John
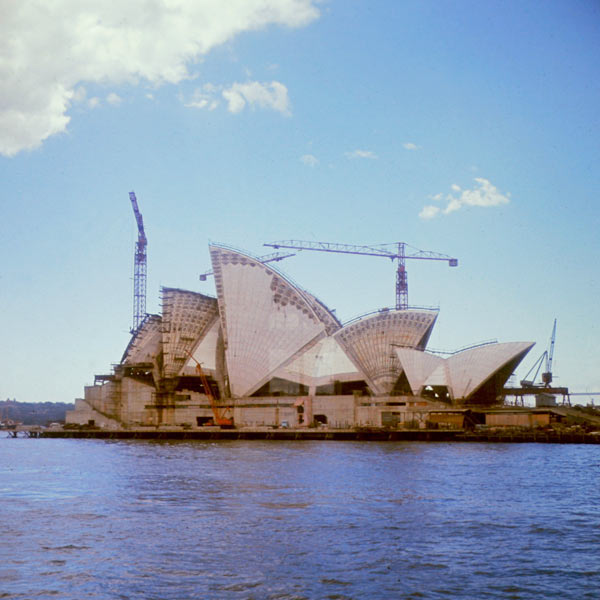
- Building of the Sydney Opera House, the topic of the opera
- Librettist: Dennis Watkins
- Language: English
- Based on: Building of the Sydney Opera House
- Premiere: 14 October 1995; Opera Theatre, Sydney Opera House

The Eighth Wonder is a 1995 opera by Alan John and with a libretto by Dennis Watkins about the building process of the Sydney Opera House.

== Production history ==
The Eighth Wonder was premiered by The Australian Opera at the Sydney Opera House on 14 October 1995 in the presence of the composer and librettist. The opera was broadcast on television by the Australian Broadcasting Corporation on the Friday evening following the world premiere performance.

It was revived by the same company (by this time known as Opera Australia) again at the Sydney Opera House in 2000.

A new adaptation, performed as part of Opera Australia's 2016 season, was retitled Sydney Opera House: The Opera. It was performed outdoors on the steps of the Opera House, with the audience wearing headphones to hear the singers and orchestra with clarity.

In 2020, spurred by composer Stephen Rae's desire to listen to the opera and finding it unavailable, a project commenced to promote the opera through a comprehensive website dedicated to the opera. The website was launched in March 2021 and resulted in a cover story feature in the April 2021 edition of Limelight magazine.

== Plot ==
The opera tells the story of the very building in which it was performed. Soon after the building was commissioned and work had commenced the State Premier who administered its genesis died.

The opera suggests that the Premier believed that if the work was not sufficiently advanced and there was a change of government then the project would be cancelled. Therefore, the foundation work was commenced before the architect had solved the problem of how to build the main structure of the building. The time and cost estimates were also understated to ensure work commenced. There were many other engineering and design problems that had not been solved when work had commenced.

The opera supports the idea that the architect was fully competent to solve these problems and indeed was able to provide solutions that were far more elegant than anything that anyone less inspired, less talented and at one with a vision could provide.

Some time after that there was indeed a change of government. There was much hostility toward the building and the new government was not willing to let the architect complete the project. Much scandal was made of the time and cost of the project. The state bureaucracy wrested control from its architect and the architect's intentions for the interiors of the building were never realised. The architect left the country and disowned the building.

Characters in the opera include the politicians, the architect, an engineer, socialites, and a prominent conductor (the maestro) who betrays the cause of opera for the cause of concert music (see full cast list below). There are also two young artists who firmly identify their future with the building. The names of the characters do not match their real-life counterparts and there are, no doubt, certain other fictional elements.

There is a large chorus and the music is quite accessible, with several bright choral climaxes. The opera consists of two acts, with a total of 15 scenes including Parliament House, the construction site and the suburban backyard where the young artists spend time with their families.

The opera concludes leaving the audience with a sense of loss for the complete vision that was never realised but also with an enormous sense of gratitude and wonderment that as much of that vision that has been completed has been.

== Premiere cast and creatives ==
Cast:

- The Architect – David Hobson
- Alexandra Mason – Clare Gormley
- The Politician/High Priest – John Pringle
- The Engineer – Roger Lemke
- Stephen Goldring – Anthony Elek
- The Maestro – Donald Shanks
- The Premier – Robert Gard
- Sky/Aunt Olive/Tour Guide – Emma Lysons
- Earth/Aunt Jean/Miss Hodges – Linda Calwell
- Madame Magda – Heather Begg
- Ken Mason/Aide de Camp – Geoffrey Chard
- Eileen Mason/The Queen – Kerry Elizabeth Brown
- Juror/Government Spokesman – David Brennan
- Architect's Daughter/Clare Goldring – Catherine Kelso
- Socialites – Anne Way, Caroline Clack, Judith Fay-Taylor
- Socialite/Second Woman – Dawn Walsh
- Art Lovers – Scott Hannigan, Christopher Bath, Leslie Andrews
- Music Lover – Jin Tea Kim
- Reporters – Stephen Mathews, Nicholas Davidson
- MP's Wife/First Woman – Susan Barber
- Government MP – David Aston
- Second Government MP/Opposition MP – David Lewis
- Onlooker/Foreman – David Aston
- Italian Worker – Mario Alafaci
- Famous Writer – Christopher Bath
- Speaker of the House – Geoffrey Crook
- Government Whip – Robert Mitchell
- Olympic Swimmer – Simon Beckett
- Warrior Prince – Jason Moore
- Architect's Wife – Amber Simpson

Creative team:

- Conductor – Richard Gill
- Director – Neil Armfield
- Set designer – Brian Thomson
- Costume designer – Angus Strathie
- Lighting designer – Rory Dempster
- Choreographer – Kim Walker
- Australian Opera and Ballet Orchestra – Concertmaster: Tony Gault
- The Australian Opera Chorus – Chorus preparation: Richard Gill
