= Beach Blanket Tempest =

Australian musical

- Poster of 1990 Penrith production
- Music: Chris Harriott
- Lyrics: Dennis Watkins
- Book: Dennis Watkins
- Premiere: 25 July 1984: Civic Theatre, Cairns
- Productions: 1984 Australian tour 1988 Brisbane; 1990 Penrith; 1991 Perth

Beach Blanket Tempest is an Australian musical with book and lyrics by Dennis Watkins and music by Chris Harriott, loosely based on Shakespeare's The Tempest. Set on the fictional island of Avalon, which according to this play is located somewhere in the Great Barrier Reef, the musical combines Shakespeare's tale with 1960s California surf film culture.

== Development ==
The musical was commissioned by the North Queensland-based New Moon Theatre Company, and developed from a self-contained sequence called "Beach Blanket Tempest" in a previous Watkins-Harriott musical, Dingo Girl.

== Production history ==
Billed as "the surf rock musical to make Shakespeare turn in his grave", New Moon's original production of Beach Blanket Tempest opened at Cairns' Civic Theatre on 25 July 1984. The production then undertook a national tour, with seasons in Townsville (Civic Theatre), Mackay (Theatre Royal), Rockhampton (Pilbeam Theatre), Mt Isa (Memorial Civic Theatre), Alice Springs (Arulen Arts Centre), Adelaide (Adelaide Festival Centre Playhouse), Canberra (Canberra Theatre) and finally a two-month season in Sydney (Footbridge Theatre), closing on 15 December 1984.

Further productions were presented by Brisbane's TN! Theatre Company in August 1988, Penrith's Q Theatre in November 1990, and Perth's SWY Theatre in August 1991. Beach Blanket Tempest has also been performed by various schools and amateur theatre companies in Australia. Canada's Muskoka Festival presented it in their 1992 season, directed by Ron Ulrich, and starring Frank McKay, Lindsay Richardson, Carol McCartney, Shane MacPherson, Joann Kirwin-Clark, George Masswohl, and Tim Koetting.

== Reception ==
The Sun-Herald described Beach Blanket Tempest as "a high-energy, wild and whacky rock spectacular" that "satisfies all the requirements of rock opera, plus loud, raunchy rock'n'roll numbers which induce foot-tapping and hand-clapping".The Canberra Times said "this show is a delight" and that "it will induce ecstasy in the under-30s".

Beach Blanket Tempest was named the 'Best New Oz Musical' of 1984 in The Sun-Herald.
