= Frank Spillane =

Australian rugby league footballer

Personal information
- Full name: Frank Spillane
- Born: 24 June 1903 Balmain, New South Wales
- Died: 30 October 1986 (aged 83) Burwood, New South Wales

Playing information
- Height: 185 cm (6 ft 1 in)
- Weight: 98 kg (15 st 6 lb)
- Position: Prop, Second-row
Club
Years	Team	Pld	T	G	FG	P
1926–32	Western Suburbs	74	21	1	0	65
1934	University	9	0	0	0	0
	Total	83	21	1	0	65
Representative
Years	Team	Pld	T	G	FG	P
1928–32	NSW City	3	0	1	0	2
1927	Metropolis	1	2	0	0	6
- Source: As of 8 July 2019
- Relatives: Debbie Spillane (granddaughter)

Frank Spillane (1903-1986) was an Australian professional rugby league footballer who played in the 1920s and 1930s. He played for Western Suburbs and University in the New South Wales Rugby League (NSWRL) competition.

== Playing career ==
Spillane made his first grade debut for Western Suburbs against St. George in Round 5 1926 at Earl Park, Arncliffe, scoring a try in a 17–12 victory. The following season, Spillane played in the club's preliminary final defeat against South Sydney. Spillane earned his first representative honour in 1927, being selected to play for Metropolis, the earlier version of the NSW City team. In 1929, Spillane played in Western Suburbs preliminary final defeat which was once again to South Sydney.

In 1930, Spillane was part of the Wests side which won the minor premiership and reached the 1930 NSWRL grand final against St George. Spillane played at second-row in the match as Wests were defeated 14-6 by St George at the Sydney Sports Ground. Due to the rules at the time, Western Suburbs were allowed to challenge St George for a rematch as they had finished as minor premiers. Spillane was not selected for the grand final replay which was played a week later. Western Suburbs would go on to win their first premiership as they won the match 27–2.

In 1932, Spillane played in 8 matches for Wests but did not play in the finals series or the grand final which Western Suburbs lost to South Sydney by a score of 19–12. Spillane finished his career with perennial strugglers University in 1934 where they managed to only record the one victory all season and finished with the wooden spoon.

Frank Spillane was the grandfather of Australian sports journalist, Debbie Spillane.
