= Men of Harlech (band) =

Australian band

- Genres: Punk, Comedy
- Years active: 1978–1981
- Labels: Mushroom

Men of Harlech is an Australian pub choir made up of around 15 men of Welsh descent who would sing in pubs around the Cronulla/Farfield area. Their single "Charlie's Getting Married At Last" reached #57 on the Australian singles chart and #16 on the New Zealand charts. Jim Manzie (Ol' 55) had the song, which was written by Jarryl Wirth, and after chatting with lead singer Dennis Watkins convinced them to record it. The single, a tribute to Prince Charles and Lady Di, was recorded in a single day costing $1500.

== Discography ==
- "Charlie's Getting Married At Last"/"Tribute" (1981, Mushroom) Aus #57
