= Dennis Watkins (playwright) =

Australian playwright, producer and performer

- Other name: Lamont Cranston

Dennis Watkins is an Australian playwright, producer and performer.

Watkins used the stage name Lamont Cranston who was also a character he played in some of his productions. He wrote or co-wrote Newton Newton, Stalin - The Musical, The Iceberg Cometh, Dingo Girl, Beach Blanket Tempest, Entertainment This Week Salutes The Worst of Lamont Cranston, Ho Ho Ho It's Lamont Cranston, Pearls Before Swine, Burger Brain - The Fast Food Musical, and The Eighth Wonder. He was the lead singer of the band Men of Harlech and brought Theatre Sports to Australia and appeared as judge when it was made into a television series.

Watkins worked for the ABC as their commissioning editor for comedy, was the artistic director of the Sydney Gay and Lesbian Mardi Gras, was a board member of Company B and an associate director at the Sydney Theatre Company.
