= Connie and Carla =

- Theatrical release poster
- Directed by: Michael Lembeck
- Written by: Nia Vardalos
- Produced by: Gary Barber; Roger Birnbaum; Jonathan Glickman; Tom Hanks
- Starring: Nia Vardalos; Toni Collette; Stephen Spinella; Dash Mihok; David Duchovny
- Cinematography: Richard Greatrex
- Edited by: David Finfer
- Music by: Randy Edelman
- Production company: Spyglass Entertainment
- Distributed by: Universal Pictures (Select territories); Spyglass Entertainment (International)
- Release date: April 16, 2004
- Running time: 98 minutes
- Country: United States
- Language: English
- Budget: $27 million
- Box office: $11.3 million

Connie and Carla is a 2004 American comedy film directed by Michael Lembeck, written by Nia Vardalos and starring Vardalos alongside Toni Collette and David Duchovny. Shot in Vancouver, the film featured a number of local drag queens, including Joan-E, Justine Tyme, Carlotta Gurl, Devana Demille, Willie Taylor, Seemore Illusion, and Vivian Von BrokenHymen.

== Plot ==
Connie and Carla are two performers whose lifelong friendship and co-obsession with musical theater have brought nothing but career dead ends. Despite this, they continue their optimism, hosting a variety act at an airport lounge. After accidentally witnessing a mafia hit in Chicago, they go on the run, landing in Los Angeles. After being fired from a beauty salon, they pose as drag queens and audition to host a drag revue at a gay club called "The Handlebar".

Because they sing their own songs (a rarity for queens), they are hired, and their variety show (at first titled What a Drag (Pun Intended!) and later re-titled Connie and Carla and the Belles of the Balls after they add a few friends to the act) becomes a hit.

Things are going smoothly but they make a pact not to let men interfere with their life. This causes conflict when Connie falls for Jeff, the straight brother of Robert, one of their drag queen friends. As the show gets bigger, they convince the club owner, Stanley, to convert it into a full dinner theater, and eventually their popularity threatens to expose them.

On the official opening night of the dinner theater, the mob killers catch up with them. With the help of their drag queen friends, and to great applause from the audience (who think it is part of their act), Connie and Carla take them down.

They ultimately confess their real identities to the audience and are accepted for who they are. Connie reveals herself to Jeff, who arrives after the chaos. He accepts her and becomes her boyfriend.

== Cast ==
- Nia Vardalos as Connie
- Toni Collette as Carla
- David Duchovny as Jeff
- Stephen Spinella as Robert / Peaches
- Dash Mihok as Mikey, Carla's boyfriend
- Robert John Burke as Rudy, the sadistic crime boss
- Nick Sandow as Al, Connie's on-again-off-again-right-now-off boyfriend
- Boris McGiver as Tibor, Rudy's gullible henchman
- Alec Mapa as Lee / N'Cream
- Christopher Logan as Brian / Patty Melt
- Robert Kaiser as Paul
- Ian Gomez as Stanley, the club owner
- Chelah Horsdal as the Botoxed Friend
- Debbie Reynolds as herself
- Greg Grunberg as Studio tour guide
- Veena Sood as Mrs. Morse

=== Musicals referenced or featured ===
The following is a list of musicals referenced or featured in the film (in the order of which they are presented in the film): Barbra Streisand and Debbie Reynolds were mentioned several times before Reynolds herself appeared and performed with Connie and Carla.

- Oklahoma! – Connie and Carla perform "Oklahoma!" as young girls in their school lunchroom and in the airport lounge and "I Cain't Say No" during their audition at "The Handlebar," the gay club where they eventually become successful.
- Jesus Christ Superstar – Connie and Carla perform "Superstar" in the airport lounge and "Everything's Alright" during their first performance at The Handlebar.
- Yentl – Connie and Carla perform "Papa, Can You Hear Me?" in the airport lounge.
- Cats – Connie and Carla perform "Memory" in the airport lounge.
- The Rocky Horror Show – Peaches 'n' Creme perform "The Time Warp" at The Handlebar.
- Cabaret – Connie and Carla perform "Maybe This Time" at their audition at The Handlebar.
- Evita – Connie and Carla perform "Don't Cry for Me Argentina" at their audition at The Handlebar.
- Mame – Interludes during the picture with the character Tibor seeing several performances of Mame at different venues across the country.
- South Pacific – "I'm Gonna Wash That Man Right Outa My Hair", is part of Connie and Carla's performance in What a Drag (Pun Intended!) at The Handlebar. They also sing "There Is Nothing Like a Dame" at the end of the film with the rest of the main cast.
- Funny Girl – Connie and Carla sing "Don't Rain on My Parade", part of their performance in What a Drag (Pun Intended!) at The Handlebar.
- Thoroughly Modern Millie, The Producers, Say Goodnight, Gracie, Never Gonna Dance, Gypsy, Chicago, Mamma Mia!, Long Days Journey into Night, "Master Harold"...and the Boys, Avenue Q, Man of La Mancha, and Hairspray – Billboards for these shows are shown.
- Gypsy, Rent, and Hairspray – At this point in the film, these are mentioned by Tibor, Hairspray, of which, he got a matinée ticket, though no songs from the shows are sung. The theater productions of Hairspray and Mamma Mia! became semi-successful movie musicals shortly after this film.
- Gypsy – "Let Me Entertain You" is performed by Connie, Carla, and the Belles of the Balls.
- Hair – Connie says the guys should enter from the back of the house on "Good Morning Starshine".
- The Music Man – Debbie Reynolds says they should enter from the back of the house on "Seventy-Six Trombones".
- Grease – Debbie Reynolds, Connie, Carla, and the Belles of the Balls sing "There Are Worse Things I Could Do".
- A Chorus Line – Connie and Carla sing "What I Did for Love".
- Guys and Dolls – Connie mentions "the Guys and Dolls tribute."

== Reception ==
=== Box office ===
The film had a budget of $27 million, and grossed $8,085,771 domestically, and $3,255,245 in foreign release, making $11,341,016 worldwide. The film grossed $3,254,940 during its opening weekend, opening at number 13 in the weekend box office. The film has been released on DVD and incorrectly has the runtime at 1 hour, 48 minutes.

=== Critical response ===
Rotten Tomatoes gives the film a 43% critic score based on reviews from 118 critics. The site's consensus states: "The two female leads, as well as energitic musical numbers, enliven an otherwise silly reworking of Billy Wilder's Some Like It Hot."

== See also ==
- List of American films of 2004
- Drag queen
- Faux queen – Women who dress as drag queens
