= Toni Collette & the Finish =

Australian band fronted by Toni Collette

Toni Collette & The Finish
- Origin: Australia
- Years active: 2006–2007
- Labels: Hoola Hoop Records
- Website: Toni Collete & The Finish Official Site

Toni Collette & The Finish were a band fronted by Australian actress, singer and songwriter Toni Collette. Other band members included Collette's estranged husband Dave Galafassi, Glenn Richards, David Lane and Pete Farley.

== Tours ==
Toni Collette & The Finish toured constantly around Australia throughout the end of 2006 to early 2007. Most venues were sell outs. The shows had a positive reception.

Toni performed her last 2007 gig at The Vanguard at Newtown as a secret show; this show was sold out within a few days.

Toni & The Finish announced that they will do a very special "warm up" show at the Gaelic Club Surry Hills on the 5/7/2007 for the basis to have fun before Live Earth. This also was the mark of Glenn Richards on guitar reuniting with the band to perform live as on the band's Look Up tour Richards was unable to tour with them because of recording commitments with Augie March. This warm-up show sold out the Gaelic club and got a very positive reaction from the crowd.

Toni Collette and The Finish played at the Australian leg of the Live Earth concert in Sydney on 7 July 2007. This was their biggest gig to date. Toni Collette & The Finish headlined the concert along with Wolfmother, Crowded House, Jack Johnson, and Missy Higgins.

== Personnel ==
- Toni Collette (vocals, primary music composition/lyrics authorship) - Front-woman of the band.
- Dave Galafassi (drums) – Collette's husband. Drummer in many local Sydney bands.
- Glenn Richards (guitar) – A successful singer/songwriter/guitarist, Richards won 2007 Song of the Year for his band Augie March's "One Crowded Hour".
- Pete Farley (bass) – A multi-instrumentalist who has played in many successful independent Sydney bands.
- David Lane (piano/keys) – A successful singer/songwriter who has recorded three LPs.
- Amanda Brown (multi-instrumentalist) – Joined The Finish for the band's Australian tour.

== Discography ==
=== Albums ===
Title	Album details
Beautiful Awkward Pictures	Released: 2006; Label: Hoola Hoop (hoolahoop0002); Formats: CD, DD

=== Singles ===
List of singles, with selected chart positions
Title	Year	Peak chart positions	Album
Title	Year	AUS	Album
"Beautiful Awkward Pictures"	2006	99	Beautiful Awkward Pictures
"Look Up"	2006	—	Beautiful Awkward Pictures

== Awards and nominations ==
=== AIR Awards ===
The Australian Independent Record Awards (commonly known informally as AIR Awards) is an annual awards night to recognise, promote and celebrate the success of Australia's Independent Music sector.

Year	Nominee / work	Award	Result
2007	Toni Collette and The Finish	Most Outstanding New Independent Artist	Nominated
