= Theatre Sports (TV series) =

Australian comedy television series

- Genre: Improvisational comedy
- Written by: Trevor Farrant
- Directed by: Martin Coombes
- Starring: Paul Chubb; Dennis Watkins; Debbie Spillane; The Hanging Judge
- Country of origin: Australia
- Original language: English
- No. of series: 1
- No. of episodes: 11

Production
- Producer: Geoff Portmann
- Running time: 30 minutes

Original release
- Network: ABC
- Release: 5 February – 16 April 1987

Theatre Sports is an Australian improvisational comedy television series broadcast by the ABC in 1987. It was based on the Canadian game of theatresports, created by Keith Johnstone, and features four teams of four improvising based on supplied game scenarios. Theatre Sports had become popular at the Belvoir Street Theatre where it was run by Dennis Watkins and Paul Chubb. ABC adapted it for TV bringing in Chubb as host and Watkins as a judge alongside Debbie Spillane and The Hanging Judge.

== Cast ==
- Paul Chubb - Host
- Dennis Watkins - Judge
- Debbie Spillane - Judge
- The Hanging Judge - Judge
- Chris Harriott - Mr Music
- Jenny Lovell - Score Keeper
