= Debbie Spillane =

Australian sports journalist and commentator

Debbie Spillane AM
- Born: Deborah Elizabeth Spillane; 25 December 1955 (age 70); Sydney, New South Wales, Australia
- Education: Bethlehem College, Ashfield
- Alma mater: University of Sydney
- Occupation: Sports journalist
- Years active: 1984–present
- Relatives: Frank Spillane (grandfather)

Deborah Elizabeth Spillane AM (born 25 December 1955) is an Australian sports journalist and commentator.

== Early life and education ==
Spillane was born in Sydney, and was educated at Bethlehem College, Ashfield and received a Bachelor of Arts from the University of Sydney.

== Media career ==
In 1984, she joined the Australian Broadcasting Corporation as a sports commentator and reporter, and was the first full-time female broadcaster hired by ABC Sport. In the same year was sent as a reporter to the 1984 Summer Olympics in Los Angeles, and two years later to the 1986 Commonwealth Games in Edinburgh. She was a sideline reporter for ABC's rugby league coverage, and was the first woman to commentate cricket on ABC Radio. In 1987 she was a judge on ABC's Theatre Sports.

From 1990 to 1995, Spillane co-hosted the drive time program Hard Coffee with Ian Rogerson for Triple J. Around the same time, she was a regular panelist on Andrew Denton's Live and Sweaty program from 1991 to 1994.

In 1995, Spillane left the ABC and became the media manager of the Bulldogs national rugby league team. She continued in several sports/media-related endeavours including as media manager of the West Sydney Razorbacks basketball team; as a sports columnist for The Sun-Herald and The Australian; and on the radio stations 2GB, 2Day FM, New FM, KICK AM and 2BL.

In 2002, she returned to the ABC as part of the broadcasting team for ABC NewsRadio, and in 2012 became the host of ABC Radio's Grandstand program.

She was awarded 2017 Australian Sports Commission Media Award for Lifetime Achievement.

On 12 December 2021, Spillane was inducted to the Sydney Cricket Ground Media Hall of Honour, alongside 11 others added to the inaugural 15 media personalities who were celebrated in 2014.

== Bibliography ==
In 2007, Allen & Unwin published Spillane's autobiography, titled Where Do You Think You're Goin', Lady?: Adventures of a Sports-mad Redhead.
