= List of awards and nominations received by Toni Collette =

Toni Collette awards and nominations
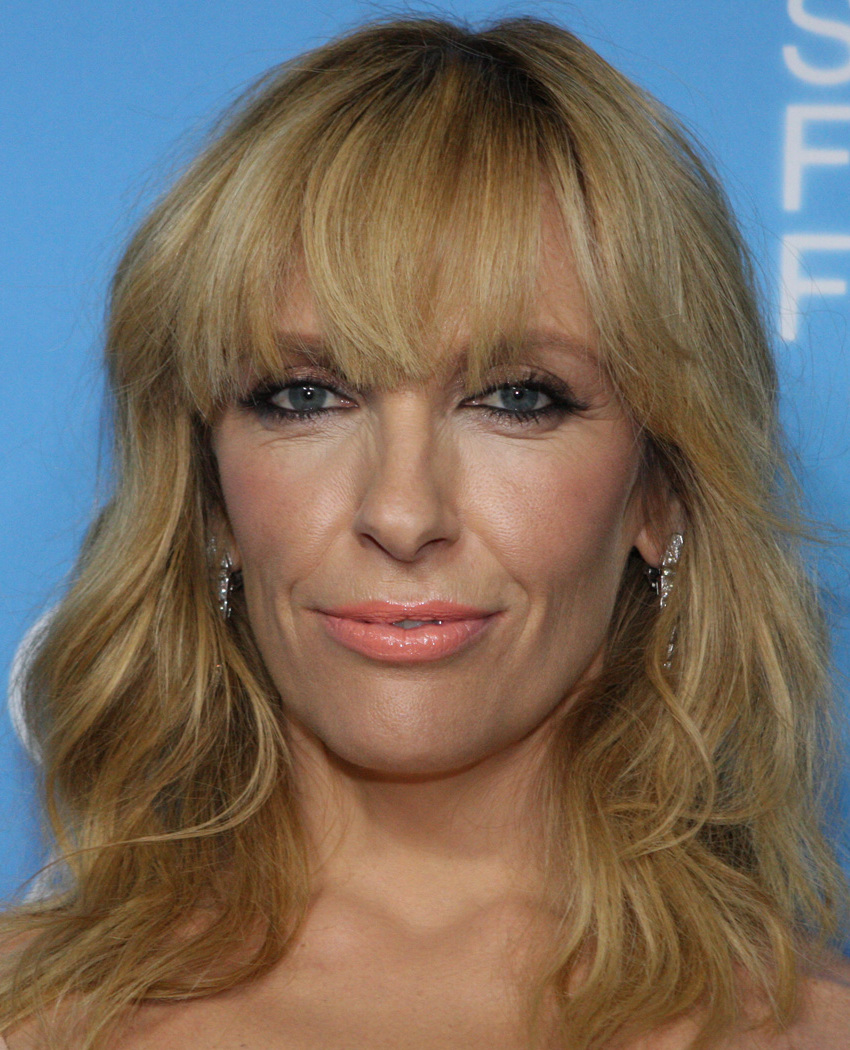
- Collette in 2013
Awards and nominations
Award	Wins	Nominations
Academy Awards	0	1
Actor Awards	1	4
BAFTA Awards	0	2
Critics' Choice Awards	2	5
Primetime Emmy Awards	1	4
Golden Globe Awards	1	6
Tony Awards	0	1

Totals (Note: Certain award groups do not simply award one winner. They acknowledge several different recipients, have runners-up, and have third place. Since this is a specific recognition and is different from losing an award, runner-up mentions are considered wins in this award tally. For simplification and to avoid errors, each award in this list has been presumed to have had a prior nomination.)
- Wins: 35
- Nominations: 89

Toni Collette is an Australian actress, producer, and singer-songwriter. Among her numerous accolades, Collette received five AACTA Awards from eight nominations, a Golden Globe Award from six nominations, a Primetime Emmy Award from four nominations, and a Screen Actors Guild Award from four nominations. She also received nominations for two British Academy Film Awards and the Academy Award for Best Supporting Actress.

Collette's breakthrough role came in the comedy-drama Muriel's Wedding (1994), for which she earned her first Golden Globe Award nomination. She achieved greater recognition for The Sixth Sense (1999), for which she was nominated for the Academy Award for Best Supporting Actress. Her Broadway performance in The Wild Party (2000) earned her a nomination for the Tony Award for Best Actress in a Musical. She went on to earn BAFTA Award nominations for About a Boy (2002) and Little Miss Sunshine (2006). For her role in the limited series Tsunami: The Aftermath (2006), she earned her nominations for a Primetime Emmy Award and a Golden Globe Award. Collette earned further acclaim for her lead role in the comedy drama series United States of Tara (2008–2011), for which she won a Primetime Emmy Award and a Golden Globe Award. For the limited series Unbelievable (2019), she received a Critics' Choice Television Award and nominations for a Golden Globe Award and a Primetime Emmy Award.

== Major associations ==
=== Academy Awards ===
Year	Category	Nominated work	Result	Ref.
2000	Best Supporting Actress	The Sixth Sense	Nominated	

=== Actor Awards ===
Year	Category	Nominated work	Result	Ref.
2003	Outstanding Performance by an Ensemble Cast in a Motion Picture	The Hours	Nominated	
2007	Outstanding Performance by an Ensemble Cast in a Motion Picture	Little Miss Sunshine	Won	
2010	Outstanding Performance by a Female Actor in a Comedy Series	United States of Tara	Nominated	
2020	Outstanding Performance by a Female Actor in a Miniseries or Motion Picture Made for Television	Unbelievable	Nominated	

=== BAFTA Awards ===
Year	Category	Nominated work	Result	Ref.
British Academy Film Awards
2003	Best Actress in a Supporting Role	About a Boy	Nominated	
2007	Best Actress in a Supporting Role	Little Miss Sunshine	Nominated	

=== Critics' Choice Awards ===
Year	Category	Nominated work	Result	Ref.
Critics' Choice Movie Awards
2003	Best Acting Ensemble	The Hours	Nominated	
2007	Best Acting Ensemble	Little Miss Sunshine	Won	
2019	Best Actress	Hereditary	Nominated	
2020	Best Acting Ensemble	Knives Out	Nominated	
Critics' Choice Television Awards
2020	Best Supporting Actress in a Movie/Miniseries	Unbelievable	Won	

=== Emmy Awards ===
Year	Category	Nominated work	Result	Ref.
Primetime Emmy Awards
2007	Outstanding Supporting Actress in a Limited Series or Television Movie	Tsunami: The Aftermath	Nominated	
2009	Outstanding Lead Actress in a Comedy Series	United States of Tara	Won	
2010	Outstanding Lead Actress in a Comedy Series	United States of Tara	Nominated	
2020	Outstanding Supporting Actress in a Limited Series or Television Movie	Unbelievable	Nominated	
2022	Outstanding Lead Actress in a Limited or Anthology Series or Movie	The Staircase	Nominated	

=== Golden Globe Awards ===
Year	Category	Nominated work	Result	Ref.
1996	Best Actress in a Motion Picture – Musical or Comedy	Muriel's Wedding	Nominated	
2007	Best Actress in a Motion Picture – Musical or Comedy	Little Miss Sunshine	Nominated	
2007	Best Supporting Actress – Series, Miniseries or Motion Picture Made for Television	Tsunami: The Aftermath	Nominated	
2010	Best Actress in a Television Series – Musical or Comedy	United States of Tara	Won	
2011	Best Actress in a Television Series – Musical or Comedy	United States of Tara	Nominated	
2020	Best Supporting Actress – Series, Miniseries or Motion Picture Made for Television	Unbelievable	Nominated	

=== Tony Awards ===
Year	Category	Nominated work	Result	Ref.
2000	Best Actress in a Musical	The Wild Party	Nominated	

== Other awards ==
Award	Year	Category	Nominated work	Result	Ref.
AACTA Awards	1991	Best Actress in a Supporting Role	Spotswood	Nominated	
AACTA Awards	1994	Best Actress in a Leading Role	Muriel's Wedding	Won	
AACTA Awards	1996	Best Actress in a Supporting Role	Lilian's Story	Won	
AACTA Awards	1998	Best Actress in a Supporting Role	The Boys	Won	
AACTA Awards	2003	Best Actress in a Leading Role	Japanese Story	Won	
AACTA Awards	2008	Best Actress in a Supporting Role	The Black Balloon	Won	
AACTA Awards	2013	Best Actress in a Leading Role	Mental	Nominated	
AACTA Awards	2017	Best Lead Actress in a Television Drama	Blue Murder: Killer Cop	Nominated	
AACTA International Awards	2006	Best Actress	In Her Shoes	Nominated	
AACTA International Awards	2007	Best Actress	Little Miss Sunshine	Nominated	
AACTA International Awards	2009	Best Actress	United States of Tara	Won	
AACTA International Awards	2010	Best Actress	United States of Tara	Nominated	
AACTA International Awards	2019	Best Actress	Hereditary	Nominated	
AACTA International Awards	2020	Best Supporting Actress	Knives Out	Nominated	
Alliance of Women Film Journalists	2006	Best Actress in a Comedic Performance	Little Miss Sunshine	Nominated	
Alliance of Women Film Journalists	2006	Best Ensemble Cast	Little Miss Sunshine	Won	
Alliance of Women Film Journalists	2019	Bravest Performance	Hereditary	Nominated	
ASTRA Awards	2015	Most Outstanding Performance by an Actor – Female	Devil's Playground	Nominated	
Austin Film Critics Association	2019	Best Actress	Hereditary	Nominated	
Australian Film Critics Association	2013	Best Actress	Mental	Nominated	
Australian Film Critics Association	2018	Best Supporting Actress	Jasper Jones	Nominated	
Blockbuster Entertainment Awards	2000	Favorite Supporting Actress – Suspense	The Sixth Sense	Won	
Blockbuster Entertainment Awards	2001	Favorite Supporting Actress – Action	Shaft	Nominated	
Boston Society of Film Critics	2002	Best Supporting Actress	About a Boy	Won	
Boston Society of Film Critics	2002	Best Supporting Actress	The Hours	Won	
Chicago Film Critics Association	1996	Most Promising Actress	Muriel's Wedding	Nominated	
Chicago Film Critics Association	2006	Best Supporting Actress	Little Miss Sunshine	Nominated	
Chicago Film Critics Association	2018	Best Actress	Hereditary	Won	
Detroit Film Critics Society	2018	Best Actress	Hereditary	Won	
Dorian Awards	2019	Film Performance of the Year – Actress	Hereditary	Nominated	
Film Critics Circle of Australia	1995	Best Actress	Muriel's Wedding	Won	
Film Critics Circle of Australia	1999	Best Supporting Actress	The Boys	Nominated	
Film Critics Circle of Australia	2002	Best Actress	Dirty Deeds	Nominated	
Film Critics Circle of Australia	2003	Best Actress	Japanese Story	Won	
Film Critics Circle of Australia	2009	Best Supporting Actress	The Black Balloon	Won	
Florida Film Critics Circle	2018	Best Actress	Hereditary	Runner-up	
Georgia Film Critics Association	2019	Best Actress	Hereditary	Won	
Gold Derby Awards	2002	Best Supporting Actress	About a Boy	Nominated	
Gold Derby Awards	2002	Best Ensemble Cast	The Hours	Won	
Gold Derby Awards	2006	Best Ensemble Cast	Little Miss Sunshine	Won	
Gotham Awards	2006	Best Ensemble Cast	Little Miss Sunshine	Nominated	
Gotham Awards	2018	Best Actress	Hereditary	Won	
Houston Film Critics Society	2019	Best Actress	Hereditary	Won	
Independent Spirit Awards	2019	Best Female Lead	Hereditary	Nominated	
Inside Film Awards	2003	Best Actress	Japanese Story	Won	
Irish Film & Television Academy Awards	2015	Best International Actress	Glassland	Nominated	
London Film Critics' Circle	2019	Actress of the Year	Hereditary	Nominated	
Los Angeles Film Critics Association	2018	Best Actress	Hereditary	Runner-up	
Online Film Critics Society	2019	Best Actress	Hereditary	Won	
Prism Awards	2010	Performance in a Comedy Series	United States of Tara	Nominated	
Prism Awards	2011	Performance in a Comedy Series	United States of Tara	Won	
San Francisco Film Critics Circle	2018	Best Actress	Hereditary	Nominated	
Satellite Awards	2000	Best Supporting Actress – Motion Picture Drama	The Sixth Sense	Nominated	
Satellite Awards	2003	Best Supporting Actress – Motion Picture Musical or Comedy	About a Boy	Nominated	
Satellite Awards	2004	Best Actress – Motion Picture Drama	Japanese Story	Nominated	
Satellite Awards	2005	Best Actress – Motion Picture Drama	In Her Shoes	Nominated	
Satellite Awards	2006	Best Actress – Motion Picture Musical or Comedy	Little Miss Sunshine	Nominated	
Satellite Awards	2009	Best Actress – Television Series Musical or Comedy	United States of Tara	Nominated	
Satellite Awards	2010	Best Actress – Television Series Musical or Comedy	United States of Tara	Nominated	
Saturn Awards	2019	Best Actress	Hereditary	Nominated	
Seattle Film Critics Society	2018	Best Actress	Hereditary	Won	
St. Louis Film Critics Association	2018	Best Actress	Hereditary	Won	
Telluride Film Festival	2003	Silver Medallion	Toni Collette	Recipient	
Toronto Film Critics Association	2002	Best Supporting Actress	About a Boy	Runner-up (Note: Tied with Kathy Bates for About Schmidt.)	
Vancouver Film Critics Circle	2003	Best Supporting Actress	The Hours	Won	
Washington D.C. Area Film Critics Association	2018	Best Actress	Hereditary	Nominated	
Women Film Critics Circle	2018	Best Actress	Hereditary	Runner-up	
