= Burger Brain - The Fast Food Musical =

- Music: Chris Harriott
- Lyrics: Dennis Watkins
- Book: Dennis Watkins
- Premiere: 27 September 1988: Everest Theatre (Seymour Centre), Chippendale, NSW
- Productions: 1988 Sydney

Burger Brain - The Fast Food Musical is an Australian musical with book and lyrics by Dennis Watkins and music by Chris Harriott.

Staged by the Australian Theatre for Young People it was directed by Stephen Lloyd Helper it featured a cast of forty and the lead roles were shared. On opening night lead roles of Waldo and Hanna were played by Huey Acuna and Toni Collette. Other cast members include Nadine Weinberger, Daryl Aberhart and Margaret Dokic.

== Reception ==
The Eastern Herald's Emily Gibson wrote "It's very hard not to be affected by 40 people singing and stamping their hearts out on stage. Brain, The Fast Food Musical is an infectiously enjoyable show." Bob Evans of The Sydney Morning Herald praised the show noting "The young cast mostly handle it well, although at times the spick-and-span conception borders on the slick."
