= Robyne Dunn =

- Born: 1963 (age 62–63)
- Origin: Sydney, Australia
- Genres: Jazz, pop

Robyne Dunn (born 1963) is an Australian jazz singer, songwriter and pianist. She was nominated for the 1990 ARIA Award for Best Female Artist with the vinyl Labour of Liberty, In 1992, she also recorded the song "You and Me" with Geoff Robertson & Kevin Bennett for the Yoram Gross movie Blinky Bill: The Mischievous Koala.

== Discography ==
=== Albums ===
List of albums
| Title | Details |
|---|---|
| Labour of Liberty | Released: 1989; Label: Mushroom (D 30139); Format: LP, CD |
| Stowaway | Released: 1994; Label: MDS (Dunn 1); Format: CD |
| Spindrift | Released: 1997; Label: ABC Music, EMI (7243 8 33331 2 7); Format: CD |
| Songs from The Belfry | Released: 2007; Label: Laughing Outlaw Records (LORCD-097); Format: CD |

=== Live albums ===
List of albums
| Title | Details |
|---|---|
| Live at the Basement | Released: 2002; Label: Laughing Outlaw Records (LORCD-042); Format: CD |

=== Extended plays ===
List of EPs
| Title | Details |
|---|---|
| Robyne Dunn | Released: 1987; Label: Mushroom (L18008); Format: 12" LP |
