= Peggy Robertson =

English personal assistant to Albert Hitchcock (1916 –1998)

Margaret Robertson (née Singer; 13 September 1916 – 6 February 1998) was a British script supervisor and personal assistant to Alfred Hitchcock from the 1940s to the 1970s during which time she worked on his films Under Capricorn (1948) and Stage Fright (1950), before joining his team permanently on Vertigo (1958), working thereafter on all of the director's remaining films.

== Early life ==
Margaret Singer (nicknamed "Peggy") was born in London, England, the daughter of Adolph Singer and the former Gladys Follick.

== Career ==
Robertson first met Hitchcock in 1948 at Denham Film Studios in London, England and moved to MGM-British Studios in Borehamwood to assist Hitchcock with the production of Under Capricorn (1949), on which she was credited for continuity (as Peggy Singer). She helped to resolve conflicts between Ingrid Bergman and the director.

After commitments elsewhere, she became a permanent member of Hitchcock's production staff beginning with Vertigo, and "turned out to be a significant force" behind the look and sound of later Hitchcock films. Robertson was Hitchcock's de facto associate producer, though she was never credited as such.

Hitchcock relied on Robertson to sift through prospective material for films, and after reading Anthony Boucher's positive review of the novel Psycho in his "Criminals at Large" column, Robertson decided to show the book to Hitchcock, even though studio readers at Paramount Pictures had already rejected its premise for a film. Hitchcock acquired rights to the novel for $9,500 and reportedly ordered Robertson to buy up copies to preserve the novel's surprises.

She later worked as an associate producer on several Peter Bogdanovich films including Mask (1985).

== Personal life ==
Peggy Singer married Canadian film editor Douglas Robertson.

== Death ==
She was widowed in 1983, and died in 1998, aged 81, at the Motion Picture and Television Hospital in Woodland Hills, California, following a long illness. She was survived by a sister, Hazel Singer.

== Legacy ==
Robertson was portrayed by actress Toni Collette in the 2012 biographical film Hitchcock.
