= Miss You Already =

2015 film by Catherine Hardwicke

- Theatrical release poster
- Directed by: Catherine Hardwicke
- Written by: Morwenna Banks
- Based on: Goodbye by Morwenna Banks
- Produced by: Christopher Simon
- Starring: Toni Collette; Drew Barrymore; Dominic Cooper; Paddy Considine; Frances de la Tour; Jacqueline Bisset
- Cinematography: Elliot Davis
- Edited by: Phillip J. Bartell
- Music by: Harry Gregson-Williams
- Production companies: New Sparta Films; S Films
- Distributed by: Entertainment One
- Release dates: 12 September 2015 (TIFF); 25 September 2015 (United Kingdom)
- Running time: 112 minutes
- Country: United Kingdom
- Language: English
- Box office: $8.2 million

Miss You Already is a 2015 British romantic comedy-drama film directed by Catherine Hardwicke and written by Morwenna Banks, based on Banks's 2013 radio drama Goodbye. The film stars Toni Collette, Drew Barrymore, Dominic Cooper, Paddy Considine, Tyson Ritter, Frances de la Tour, and Jacqueline Bisset. It was screened in the Gala Presentations section of the 2015 Toronto International Film Festival.

The film opened theatrically in the United Kingdom on 25 September 2015 and in the United States on 6 November 2015 with positive critical reviews.

== Plot ==
Childhood best friends Milly and Jess do everything together. As they grow older, however, Milly settles down and marries her rocker boyfriend Kit while Jess becomes an environmentalist and marries her longtime boyfriend Jago.

Milly, busy with her career and her young family, learns that she has breast cancer after a long-delayed check-up. She finds herself unable to tell Kit and, after a week, finally confides in Jess. Once she tells Kit and their children, Scarlett and Ben, Milly tasks Jess with helping her get through chemotherapy and the two women joke around as Milly receives her treatments. During this time period, Jess, who has been unable to conceive naturally, puts off IVF treatments with Jago, feeling that she cannot keep trying to have children while Milly is sick. After Jago grows exasperated, Jess finally decides to give it a shot and the couple manage to conceive a baby shortly after.

The night Jess learns that she is pregnant, Milly learns that though she has responded to the chemotherapy, she still needs a double mastectomy. She goes to a bar and gets drunk and, when Jess retrieves her, confesses that she has a big ego and does not want to appear unattractive. Jess reassures her that she will always want her in her life. Milly goes through with the double mastectomy but Jess finds herself unable to tell Milly she is pregnant as she feels as though her good news would cause Milly grief. Meanwhile, Jess learns Jago must go away to work on an oil rig to pay for their IVF treatments.

Milly finds herself growing increasingly distant from Kit after the surgery. After he arranges a surprise birthday dinner, Milly walks out, taking Jess with her and the two go all the way to West Yorkshire ostensibly to see the moors where the Brontë sisters grew up, though, in reality, Milly is chasing down a barman, Ace, that she had sex with post-surgery. When Jess discovers the deception, she and Milly argue and Jess leaves the area as quick as possible after showing Milly her bump. She falls in her exit and then bounces around on a bus for hours. This causes complications in her pregnancy.

For a while, Milly and Jess are estranged. During this period, Jess learns that she is having a high-risk pregnancy caused by her fall at the moors while Milly learns that while her breast cancer is in remission she also has fatal malignant tumours in her brain. Milly tracks down Jess and the women reconcile, Jess shares about her pregnancy complications and what happened at the moors to cause it. She also confesses her affair to Kit and although he feels betrayed, he decides to make love to Milly knowing that her days are numbered. Milly eventually tells her children that she will die and must go into hospice care. While there, she tells Jess she is holding on for the birth of Jess's first child.

Jess goes into labour early while Jago is still on the oil rig. While Kit does not want Milly to attend the labour, her mother, Miranda, helps her sneak out of the hospice so she is able to be there when Jess gives birth. Some days after, Milly dies at the hospice with Jess by her side. A few years later, Jess is pregnant with her second child, and the two families have lunch together. Jess muses on how her friend was irreplaceable but then recognises a trait of hers in Scarlett.

== Cast ==
- Toni Collette as Milly
  - Sophie Holland as 21-year-old Milly
  - Lucy Morton as 13-year-old Milly
  - Eleanor Stagg as 10-year-old Milly
- Drew Barrymore as Jess
  - Charlotte Hope as 21-year-old Jess
  - Emily Trappen as 13-year-old Jess
  - Grace Schneider as 10-year-old Jess
- Mem Ferda as Achmed
- Dominic Cooper as Kit
  - Max Rinehart as 21-year-old Kit
- Paddy Considine as Jago
- Tyson Ritter as Ace
- Frances de la Tour as Jill
- Jacqueline Bisset as Miranda
- Honor Kneafsey as Scarlett
- Ryan Lennon Baker as Ben
- Janice Acquah as Nisha
- Charlotte Ubben as Cheryl
- Shola Adewusi as Athena
- Anjli Mohindra as Kira
- Noah Huntley as company executive

== Production ==
=== Development ===
The film is based on Morwenna Banks's radio play Goodbye, which was first broadcast on BBC Radio 4. The project was first announced on 11 February 2012, when Paul Andrew Williams was set to direct and co-wrote the script with Morwenna Banks, Entertainment One had the UK, Canada, and Australian rights to the film.

=== Casting ===
On 13 February 2012, It was announced that Jennifer Aniston would star in the film.

On 22 April 2014, it was announced that Catherine Hardwicke was set to direct the film, in which Rachel Weisz, who replaced Aniston and Toni Collette would star as lead actresses. The two leads would play childhood best friends whose relationship becomes troubled when one contracts breast cancer. Hardwicke said about the script,

"When I met Morwenna Banks and read her script, I really felt her passion for this story — this is something she lived through. She managed to take real life and turn it into a powerful, laugh-and-cry-out-loud screenplay."

But on 5 September, Drew Barrymore was added to the cast and replaced Weisz to portray her part along with Collette, Dominic Cooper, Paddy Considine, and Jacqueline Bisset. Cooper and Considine to play husbands of Barrymore and Collette, while Bisset would play Collette's character's mother. On 3 October Tyson Ritter joined the cast of the film to play the love interest of one of the lead female actresses.

=== Filming ===
Principal photography began on 7 September 2014 in London and later shooting also took place in West Yorkshire, England. The hospital that features in the film is the UCH Macmillan Cancer Centre.

== Release ==
=== Distribution ===
The film was sold to several territories, including Germany, France, Japan, South Korea, and Hong Kong.

=== Music ===
The film features the song "There's a Place" from star Tyson Ritter's band The All-American Rejects. It reached number 33 of Billboard's Digital Rock Songs chart, and was met with widely positive reception from critics and fans alike.

=== Box office ===
Miss You Already opened theatrically in the United States on 6 November 2015 in 384 venues and earned $552,506 in its opening weekend. The film ended its run 17 days later on 22 November, with a gross of $1,162,653.

=== Critical reception ===
The film received positive reviews from critics. On Rotten Tomatoes, the film has a 71% rating based on 117 reviews, with an average rating of 6.04/10. The site's consensus states: "Miss You Already isn't shy about going for filmgoers' tear ducts, but its solid script and talented cast are often powerful enough to make up for its more manipulative moments." Metacritic reports a 59 out of 100 rating, based on 24 critics, indicating "mixed or average reviews".

== Home media ==
Miss You Already was released on region 1 DVD and Blu-ray on 1 March 2016.
