= I'm Gonna Wash That Man Right Outa My Hair =

Song
- Published: 1949
- Composer: Richard Rodgers
- Lyricist: Oscar Hammerstein II

"I'm Gonna Wash That Man Right Outa My Hair" is a song from the musical South Pacific, sung by Nellie Forbush, the female lead, originally played by Mary Martin in the 1949 Broadway production. Her character, fed up with a man (Emile De Becque) and singing energetically in the shower, claims that she will forget about him. The song was written by Rodgers and Hammerstein in response to Martin's request. She had starred on Broadway for years and Martin suggested that she wash her hair on stage during the performance.

Ella Fitzgerald covered the song with Gordon Jenkins and his orchestra on a 78 rpm single in 1955.

Mitzi Gaynor performed the song in the 1958 film of the musical and on its soundtrack album. She was one of only two film performers to sing on the soundtrack album.

PJ Harvey referenced the song in her 1992 single "Sheela-Na-Gig" with the repeated lyric "gonna wash that man right outa my hair".

Boyfriend released her cover simply titled "Wash That" in November 2018.

Clairol created an ad campaign in the 1980s using the song with the alternative line "I'm gonna wash that gray right outta my hair."
