= Teen Choice Award for Choice Movie – Comedy =

Entertainment award category

The following is a list of the Teen Choice Award winners and nominees for Choice Movie – Comedy.

== Winners and nominees ==
=== 1999 ===
Year	Winner	Nominees	Ref.
1999	There's Something About Mary	10 Things I Hate About You; Election; Never Been Kissed; Patch Adams; Shakespeare in Love; She's All That; The Waterboy	

=== 2000s ===
Year	Winner	Nominees	Ref.
2000	Austin Powers: The Spy Who Shagged Me	American Pie; Deuce Bigalow: Male Gigolo; Down to You; Galaxy Quest; High Fidelity; Road Trip; Whatever It Takes	
2001	Miss Congeniality	Bring It On; Charlie's Angels; Dude, Where's My Car?; Joe Dirt; Josie and the Pussycats; Meet the Parents; The Wedding Planner	
2002	American Pie 2	Not Another Teen Movie; Orange County; The Princess Diaries; Scooby-Doo; Shallow Hal; The Sweetest Thing; Zoolander	
2003	Sweet Home Alabama	Anger Management; Bringing Down the House; Head of State; Jackass: The Movie; Kangaroo Jack; The Lizzie McGuire Movie; Malibu's Most Wanted	
2004	Shrek 2	13 Going on 30; 50 First Dates; American Wedding; Elf; Freaky Friday; Mean Girls; School of Rock	
2005	Napoleon Dynamite	Are We There Yet?; Guess Who; Hitch; Kicking & Screaming; The Longest Yard; Meet the Fockers; The Pacifier	
2006	She's the Man	The Benchwarmers; The Break-Up; Click; Nacho Libre; Scary Movie 4	
2007	Knocked Up	Blades of Glory; Evan Almighty; Night at the Museum; Ocean's Thirteen	
2008	Juno	Baby Mama; College Road Trip; Semi-Pro; Superbad	
2009	Night at the Museum: Battle of the Smithsonian	The Hangover; Land of the Lost; Paul Blart: Mall Cop; Yes Man	

=== 2010s ===
Year	Winner	Nominees	Ref.
2010	Date Night	Get Him to the Greek; Hot Tub Time Machine; Killers; She's Out of My League	
2011	Bad Teacher	Bridesmaids; Due Date; Little Fockers; The Other Guys	
2012	21 Jump Street	American Reunion; Crazy, Stupid, Love; The Muppets; What to Expect When You're Expecting	
2013	Pitch Perfect	Identity Thief; The Incredible Burt Wonderstone; Peeples; Warm Bodies	
2014	The Other Woman	Anchorman 2: The Legend Continues; Blended; Ride Along; Vampire Academy	
2015	Pitch Perfect 2	Aloha; The Duff; Dumb and Dumber To; Night at the Museum: Secret of the Tomb; Paul Blart: Mall Cop 2	
2016	Ride Along 2	Barbershop: The Next Cut; The Intern; Mother's Day; Mr. Right; Zoolander 2	
2017	Finding Dory	Cars 3; Keeping Up with the Joneses; The Lego Batman Movie; Table 19	
2018	Love, Simon	Daddy's Home 2; I Feel Pretty; Jumanji: Welcome to the Jungle; Overboard; Pitch Perfect 3	
2019	Crazy Rich Asians	Instant Family; Isn't It Romantic; Little; Pokémon Detective Pikachu; The Perfect Date	
