= The Other Guys =

2010 film by Adam McKay

- Theatrical release poster
- Directed by: Adam McKay
- Written by: Adam McKay; Chris Henchy
- Produced by: Will Ferrell; Adam McKay; Jimmy Miller; Patrick Crowley
- Starring: Will Ferrell; Mark Wahlberg; Eva Mendes; Michael Keaton; Steve Coogan; Ray Stevenson; Dwayne Johnson; Samuel L. Jackson
- Cinematography: Oliver Wood
- Edited by: Brent White
- Music by: Jon Brion
- Production companies: Columbia Pictures; Gary Sanchez Productions; Mosaic Media Group
- Distributed by: Sony Pictures Releasing
- Release dates: August 2, 2010 (New York City); August 6, 2010 (United States)
- Running time: 107 minutes
- Country: United States
- Language: English
- Budget: $85–100 million
- Box office: $170.9 million

The Other Guys is a 2010 American action comedy film directed by Adam McKay, who co-wrote it with Chris Henchy. It stars Will Ferrell and Mark Wahlberg with Eva Mendes, Michael Keaton, Steve Coogan, Ray Stevenson, Dwayne Johnson and Samuel L. Jackson in supporting roles.

This film is the fourth of five collaborations between Ferrell and McKay, following Anchorman: The Legend of Ron Burgundy (2004), Talladega Nights: The Ballad of Ricky Bobby (2006), and Step Brothers (2008), and followed by Anchorman 2: The Legend Continues (2013). The Other Guys is the only one not to be co-written by Ferrell. It is also the first of three collaborations between Ferrell and Wahlberg, who later reunited in Daddy's Home (2015) and Daddy's Home 2 (2017).

The film was released in the United States on August 6, 2010. It was well received by critics and grossed $170 million worldwide.

== Plot ==
After mistakenly shooting Derek Jeter at the World Series, hot-tempered NYPD detective Terry Hoitz is partnered with mild-mannered forensic accountant Allen Gamble. Both are ridiculed by their peers, who idolize detectives Chris Danson and P. K. Highsmith, considered New York City's best cops despite the major collateral damage they cause catching petty criminals.

Danson and Highsmith fall to their deaths jumping off a building while chasing jewel thieves. Other detectives, including Terry, seek to fill their vacancy. Allen, however, is only interested in investigating a scaffolding permit violation by British multi-billionaire Sir David Ershon. Terry grudgingly goes along to arrest Ershon, but they are ambushed by a team of mercenaries led by Roger Wesley who apparently kidnap Ershon.

Terry and Allen talk through the case at Allen's house, where Terry is stunned by Allen's beautiful wife, Sheila, who is a doctor. The two visit Allen's beautiful BPD ex-girlfriend, Christinith, to listen to a voice message from Allen's phone she mistakenly received during Ershon's apparent kidnapping. In the recording, Ershon tells Wesley his plan to cover $32 billion he lost on behalf of his client, Lendl Global, whose CEO, Pamela Boardman, has hired Wesley to ensure that Ershon pays her back.

When Terry and Allen arrive at a small suburban accounting office tied to Ershon, they are nearly killed by a bomb planted by Wesley. Upset by the escalating danger, Allen confides in Terry that he ran a prostitution ring in college and developed a dark, alternative personality, "Gator". He wound up in the hospital, where he met Sheila, and joined the NYPD to suppress his "Gator" persona.

Captain Gene Mauch orders Allen and Terry to hand over their evidence to a Securities and Exchange Commission agent, who turns out to be Ershon's attorney, Don Beaman. Upset when they are taken off the case, Allen briefly reverts to his Gator personality and Sheila kicks him out. Meanwhile, Terry unsuccessfully attempts to reconnect with his ex-fiancée Francine, who had left him over his anger issues.

After Terry and Allen fail to prevent Beaman's apparent suicide, Mauch splits them up, sending Terry to traffic duty and Allen to beat patrol. Allen keeps investigating on his own and learns that Wesley set up the jewel robbery as a diversion in order to break in to another accounting firm tied to Ershon. Allen convinces Terry to join him, and they brief Mauch at his second job at Bed Bath & Beyond; Mauch admits that he has hampered them because of Ershon's high-profile connections, but allows them to pursue the case.

Terry and Allen crash an investment meeting to arrest Ershon, where they learn that he has embezzled $32 billion from the NYPD pension fund. Wesley, along with Chechen and Nigerian "investors", open fire on the duo, who escape with Ershon. He confesses that the pension money is already in his account awaiting transfer to Lendl Global the next morning. Realizing that preventing the transfer will be perilous, Allen and Terry reconcile with Sheila and Francine that night.

After evading Wesley, other mercenaries and NYPD officers who believe Allen and Terry have gone rogue, the duo bring Ershon to the bank in time to stop the transfer. Mauch arrives with backup and arrests Ershon for embezzlement and Wesley for multiple counts of murder.

Ershon's arrest leads to a stock market crash and the subsequent federal bailout of Lendl Global. Terry marries Francine, and Allen reunites with Sheila. During the end credits, statistics relate the disparity between the benefits received by companies and financial executives through the TARP bailouts with those of NYPD officers.

== Cast ==
- Will Ferrell as Detective Allen "Gator" Gamble, a mild mannered forensic accountant and Hoitz's partner
- Mark Wahlberg as Detective Terry Hoitz, Gamble's partner who is loathed by the precinct for accidentally shooting Derek Jeter during the World Series
- Eva Mendes as Dr. Sheila Ramos Gamble, Allen's wife, a doctor and former Knicks dancer
- Michael Keaton as Captain Gene Mauch, the precinct's chief of police who also works at Bed Bath & Beyond
- Steve Coogan as Sir David Ershon, a British billionaire
- Ray Stevenson as Roger Wesley, Boardman's head of security and a mercenary, sent by her to monitor Ershon's activities
- Dwayne Johnson as Detective Christopher Danson, Highsmith's partner
- Samuel L. Jackson as Detective P. K. Highsmith, a cocky, idolized detective who causes property damage while pursuing minor cases
- Lindsay Sloane as Francine, Hoitz's ex-fiancé
- Natalie Zea as Christinith, Gamble's BPD ex-girlfriend
- Rob Riggle as Detective Evan Martin, who constantly hazes Hoitz and Gamble
- Damon Wayans Jr. as Detective Fosse, Martin's partner who also hazes Hoitz and Gamble
- Viola Harris as Mama Ramos, Sheila's mother
- Rob Huebel as Officer Watts, an officer in the NYPD
- Brett Gelman as Hal, Christinith's husband
- Bobby Cannavale as Jimmy, a detective with a grudge against Hoitz over the Jeter incident
- Andy Buckley as Don Beaman, Ershon's attorney
- Ben Schwartz as Beaman's Assistant
- Adam McKay as Dirty Mike, a homeless man who led a group who trashed Gamble's car after it was stolen
- Zach Woods as Douglas, an employee in Ershon's company
- Chris Gethard as Clerk
- Zoe Lister-Jones as Therapist
- Michael Delaney as Bob Littleford
- Alison Becker as Financial News Anchor
- Tess Kartel as Brazilian Merc
- Malachy McCourt as Old Man in Irish Bar

Cameos

- Anne Heche as Pamela Boardman (uncredited), the CEO of Lendl Global
- Ice-T as Narrator (voice) (uncredited)
- Horatio Sanz as gallery owner
- Thomas Middleditch as gallery attendee
- Derek Jeter as himself
- Brooke Shields as herself
- Rosie Perez as herself
- Tracy Morgan as himself
- Monty Sopp as Kip James (uncredited)
- Brian James as BG James (uncredited)
- Josef Sommer as District Attorney Louis Radford (uncredited)

Sommer played this role as an homage to his very first role 39 years prior in Dirty Harry, where he also plays a District Attorney.

== Production ==
Adam McKay described the genesis as an "accident, in a way", stemming from a dinner he and Will Ferrell had with Mark Wahlberg. After noticing the actors' chemistry, McKay wrote producer Kevin Messick an email hypothesizing a possible film starring the two, giving a cop film as an example of what he thought would work. Messick suggested developing that idea into a film.

Principal photography for the film began on September 23, 2009, in New York City. Additional scenes were filmed in Albany, Westchester and Staten Island, New York.

Practical visual effects work, including the helicopter crash scene, was done by KernerFX.

Stunt coordinator Brad Martin said in a Wall Street Journal interview that for Gamble's car, they used three Priuses, including one with a racing engine so large it had to go in the back seat.

== Release ==
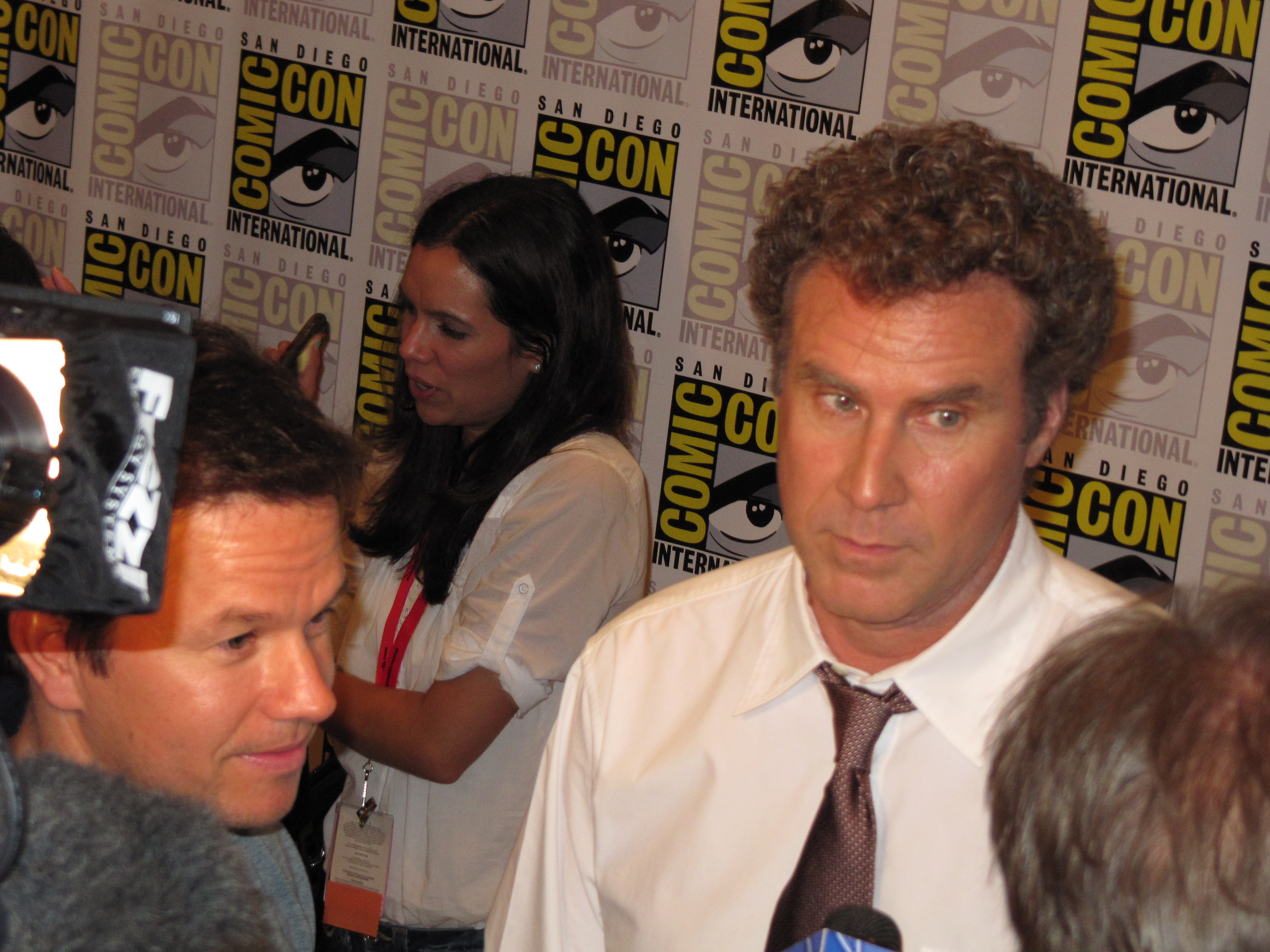
Mark Wahlberg and Will Ferrell promoting The Other Guys at San Diego Comic-Con, July 2010

In July 2010, Wahlberg and Ferrell appeared at San Diego Comic-Con to promote the film.

During an episode of Big Brother, the house guests competed in a luxury challenge to see an advance screening of the film. Although they weren't actually in the house, both Will Ferrell and Mark Wahlberg made an on-screen video appearance.

During the August 4, 2010 episode of America's Got Talent, the week's contestants saw an advance screening of the film and met Ferrell and Wahlberg.

Ferrell and Wahlberg also made a cameo appearance on an episode of WWE Raw to promote the film.

During the week leading up to the release date, the film was promoted on TruTV programs, specifically The Smoking Gun Presents: World's Dumbest.... During the Season 2 premiere for the MTV reality series Jersey Shore on July 29, 2010, special segments were shown during the commercial breaks of the show's cast broken down on a highway, discussing several movies, as part of a promotional tie-in; with The Other Guys being one of them.

They appeared in on-screen advertising on broadcast sports events like MLB and NASCAR.

== Reception ==
=== Box office ===
In its first day of release, The Other Guys grossed $13.1 million from 3,651 theaters, placing first at the US box office for the Friday. It had a large opening weekend take of $35.5 million, placing it at number one at the US box office for the weekend of August 6–8, 2010, unseating Inception, which had been number one for three weeks. The film ended up grossing $119.2 million in North America and $51.7 million in other territories, making for a worldwide total of $170.9 million.

=== Critical reception ===
On review aggregator Rotten Tomatoes, The Other Guys holds an approval rating of 78% based on 203 reviews, with an average rating of 6.7/10. The site's critical consensus reads: "A clever parody of cop-buddy action-comedies, The Other Guys delivers several impressive action set pieces and lots of big laughs, thanks to the assured comic chemistry between Will Ferrell and Mark Wahlberg." On Metacritic, the film was assigned a weighted average score of 64 out of 100, based on 35 critics, indicating "generally favorable reviews". Audiences polled by CinemaScore gave the film an average grade of "B−" on an A+ to F scale.

The film was praised as "a highly entertaining movie filled with witty dialogue and over-the-top action." Peter Travers of Rolling Stone praised the film, saying, "Don't let anyone spoil the wildly hilarious surprises. Ferrell and Wahlberg will double your fun. Guaranteed." Some critics praised The Other Guys as the best police film of the year, comparing the film to the critically panned Cop Out, with Richard Roeper stating, "Note to Kevin Smith: THIS is how you do a spoof of the buddy-cop genre," and Stephen Whitty of The Star-Ledger said in his mixed review, "Measured against this year's other police farce—remember Cop Out?—it looks absolutely heroic."

The Other Guys also received the "Best Comedy Film" award for 2010 at the first annual Comedy Awards.

=== Accolades ===
List of awards and nominations
Year	Award	Category	Recipient(s) and nominee(s)	Result
2011	Comedy Awards	Best Comedy Film	The Other Guys	Won
2011	Comedy Awards	Best Comedy Actor—Film	Will Ferrell	Nominated
2011	Comedy Awards	Best Comedy Director—Film	Adam McKay	Nominated
2011	2011 Teen Choice Awards	Choice Movie—Comedy	The Other Guys	Nominated
2011	2011 Teen Choice Awards	Choice Movie Actor—Comedy	Will Ferrell	Nominated
2011	2011 Teen Choice Awards	Choice Movie Actress—Comedy	Eva Mendes	Nominated
2011	2011 Teen Choice Awards	Choice Movie Chemistry	Will Ferrell and Mark Wahlberg	Nominated
2011	2011 Teen Choice Awards	Choice Movie Hissy Fit	Mark Wahlberg	Nominated

== See also ==
- Buddy cop film
- Ponzi scheme
