= Teen Choice Award for Choice Movie Actor – Comedy =

Entertainment award category

The following is a list of the Teen Choice Award winners and nominees for Choice Movie Actor - Comedy. Zac Efron has received the most wins with three.

== Winners and nominees ==
=== 2000s ===
Year	Winner	Nominees	Ref.
2002	Chris Tucker – Rush Hour 2	Jason Biggs – American Pie 2; Jack Black – Shallow Hal; Matthew Lillard – Scooby-Doo; Freddie Prinze Jr. – Scooby-Doo; Adam Sandler – Mr. Deeds; Ben Stiller – Zoolander; Barry Watson – Sorority Boys	
2003	Jim Carrey – Bruce Almighty	Anthony Anderson – Kangaroo Jack; Jamie Kennedy – Malibu's Most Wanted; Ashton Kutcher – Just Married; Frankie Muniz – Agent Cody Banks; Mike Myers – Austin Powers in Goldmember; Chris Rock – Head of State; Adam Sandler – Anger Management	
2004	Adam Sandler – 50 First Dates	Jack Black – School of Rock; Will Ferrell – Elf; Topher Grace – Win a Date with Tad Hamilton!; Mark Ruffalo – 13 Going on 30; Seann William Scott – American Wedding; Ben Stiller – Starsky & Hutch; Owen Wilson – Starsky & Hutch	
2005	Will Smith – Hitch	Vin Diesel – The Pacifier; Jimmy Fallon – Fever Pitch; Will Ferrell – Kicking & Screaming and Anchorman: The Legend of Ron Burgundy; Jon Heder – Napoleon Dynamite; Ashton Kutcher – Guess Who and A Lot like Love; Adam Sandler – The Longest Yard; Ben Stiller – Meet the Fockers	
2006	Johnny Depp – Charlie and the Chocolate Factory	Jack Black – Nacho Libre; Jim Carrey – Fun with Dick and Jane; Jon Heder – The Benchwarmers and Just like Heaven; Adam Sandler – Click; Vince Vaughn – The Break-Up	
2007	Will Ferrell – Talladega Nights: The Ballad of Ricky Bobby and Blades of Glory	Sacha Baron Cohen – Borat and Talladega Nights: The Ballad of Ricky Bobby; Steve Carell – Evan Almighty; Jon Heder – School for Scoundrels and Blades of Glory; Ben Stiller – Night at the Museum	
2008	Ashton Kutcher – What Happens in Vegas	Michael Cera – Superbad and Juno; Will Ferrell – Semi-Pro; Jonah Hill – Superbad; James Marsden – 27 Dresses and Enchanted	
2009	Zac Efron – 17 Again	Jim Carrey – Yes Man; Will Ferrell – Land of the Lost; Seth Rogen – Observe and Report and Pineapple Express; Ben Stiller – Night at the Museum: Battle of the Smithsonian and Tropic Thunder	

=== 2010s ===
Year	Winner	Nominees	Ref.
2010	Ashton Kutcher – Killers	Russell Brand – Get Him to the Greek; Steve Carell – Date Night; Jonah Hill – Get Him to the Greek; Chris Rock – Death at a Funeral	
2011	Justin Timberlake – Bad Teacher	Russell Brand – Arthur; Will Ferrell – The Other Guys; Zach Galifianakis – Due Date and The Hangover Part II; Ed Helms – The Hangover Part II	
2012	Channing Tatum – 21 Jump Street	Jason Biggs – American Reunion; Ryan Gosling – Crazy, Stupid, Love; Jonah Hill – 21 Jump Street and The Sitter; Chris Rock – What to Expect When You're Expecting	
2013	Skylar Astin – Pitch Perfect	Jason Bateman – Identity Thief; Steve Carell – The Incredible Burt Wonderstone; Nicholas Hoult – Warm Bodies; Craig Robinson – Peeples	
2014	Kevin Hart – Ride Along	Will Ferrell – Anchorman 2: The Legend Continues; Ice Cube – Ride Along; Johnny Knoxville – Jackass Presents: Bad Grandpa; Adam Sandler – Blended	
2015	Skylar Astin – Pitch Perfect 2	Robbie Amell – The Duff; Jim Carrey – Dumb and Dumber To; Bradley Cooper – Aloha; Kevin James – Paul Blart: Mall Cop 2; Ben Stiller – Night at the Museum: Secret of the Tomb	
2016	Zac Efron – Neighbors 2: Sorority Rising	Will Ferrell – Daddy's Home; Kevin Hart – Ride Along 2; Ice Cube – Barbershop: The Next Cut and Ride Along 2; Keegan-Michael Key – Keanu; Jordan Peele – Keanu	
2017	Zac Efron – Baywatch	Will Arnett – The Lego Batman Movie; Zach Galifianakis – Keeping Up with the Joneses; Ricky Garcia – Bigger Fatter Liar; Dwayne Johnson – Baywatch; Owen Wilson – Cars 3	
2018	Dwayne Johnson – Jumanji: Welcome to the Jungle	Jack Black – Jumanji: Welcome to the Jungle; Eugenio Derbez – Overboard; Will Ferrell – Daddy's Home 2; Kevin Hart – Jumanji: Welcome to the Jungle; Mark Wahlberg – Daddy's Home 2	
2019	Noah Centineo – The Perfect Date	Henry Golding – Crazy Rich Asians; Kevin Hart – Night School; Liam Hemsworth – Isn't It Romantic; Ryan Reynolds – Pokémon Detective Pikachu; Mark Wahlberg – Instant Family	
