= Andrea Anders =

American actress (born 1975)

- Born: May 10, 1975 (age 51); Madison, Wisconsin, U.S.
- Education: University of Wisconsin, Stevens Point (BFA); Rutgers University, New Brunswick (MFA)
- Occupation: Actress
- Years active: 1998–present
- Partner(s): Matt LeBlanc (2006–2014); Jason Keller (2015–present)
- Children: 1
- Relatives: Sean Anders (brother)

Andrea Anders (born May 10, 1975) is an American actress. She is best known for her work on television, notably through her main roles on five short-lived sitcoms, Joey, The Class, Better Off Ted, Mr. Sunshine and Mr. Mom, as well as recurring and guest roles on numerous TV series including Cruel Summer, Oz, Young Sheldon, Modern Family, Necessary Roughness, Ted Lasso, and That '90s Show. Additionally, she has been cast in nearly ten produced but unsold pilots.

In addition, she regularly appears as supporting characters in films directed or produced by her older brother Sean Anders, namely Never Been Thawed, Sex Drive, Daddy's Home 2, Instant Family, Countdown and Spirited, and has also had roles in a handful of other films such as The Stepford Wives, Return to Zero, Is That a Gun in Your Pocket? and Nancy Drew and the Hidden Staircase.

== Early life ==
Andrea Anders was born in Madison, Wisconsin, on May 10, 1975, the third child of Terrance and Sally Anders. She was raised in DeForest, Wisconsin with her sister Torri and her brother Sean, where she attended the DeForest Area High School, graduating in 1993. She went on to study acting at the University of Wisconsin–Stevens Point, receiving her bachelor's degree in fine arts in 1997. She then moved to New Jersey to study at Rutgers University's Mason Gross School of the Arts, earning a Master of Fine Arts in 2001. In addition, she trained in the Meisner technique under Maggie Flanigan and credits the teacher with her continued work as an actress.

== Career ==
=== Theatre ===
In 2001, Anders began her career in theatre. She was an understudy for Mary-Louise Parker in the Broadway production of Proof and later played the part of Elaine Robinson in The Graduate. She also appeared in On the Jump at the Arena Stage, New Doors at the Guthrie Theater, Debbie Does Dallas: The Musical and two New York Stage & Film productions: Cold/Tender and New World Rhapsody.

In May 2007, Anders started in the Geffen Playhouse performance of Fat Pig. She played the part of Jeannie, an accountant. Fat Pig closed on July 1, 2007.

=== Television and film ===
One of Anders' first appearances on television was a commercial for Danone that ran in the 1990s and then again around 2006.

Her first acting credits came between 1998 and 2001 when she appeared on the soap operas One Life to Live and Guiding Light, respectively as Elaine, one of Starr Manning's nannies, and Ellie, an assistant to Olivia Spencer.

In 2001, she appeared in the Law & Order episode "The Fire This Time", as teenager Emily Hoyt. In 2003, she played the recurring role of Donna Degenhart for five episodes of the HBO drama series Oz. That same year, Anders was cast opposite Richard Ruccolo as the original female lead in the failed television pilot for the proposed series Spellbound, about a warlock who falls in love with a mortal woman. After the pilot was not picked up by NBC, Anders was replaced for the equally unsuccessful second pilot.

In 2004, Anders made her film debut with a minor role in The Stepford Wives, playing a secretary to Nicole Kidman's main character. That same year, she was cast as Emma Leeds, the female lead in News To Me, a proposed workplace sitcom inspired by Joel Stein's experiences as the youngest-ever columnist at Time magazine; the pilot was not picked up. That same year, Anders guest starred in one episode of the series Tru Calling.

In July 2004, Anders was cast in what would be her breakthrough role as Alex Garrett, Joey Tribbiani's neighbor, landlady, friend and eventual love interest on the Friends spin-off, Joey. NBC cancelled the series during its second season.

In between seasons of Joey, Anders appeared as a "Christian Band Slut" in her older brother Sean's directorial debut film Never Been Thawed, marking the first of many collaborations between the pair.

In February 2006, prior to Joey's cancellation, Anders signed as a series regular of the sitcom The Class as Nicole, the unfulfilled wife of a former pro-football player who reconnects with her high school boyfriend after a class reunion. Despite steady ratings and winning the Favorite New TV Comedy Award at the 33rd People's Choice Awards, CBS did not renew the show for a second season.

In 2008, following The Class' cancelation, Anders guest starred on the episode "Power" of the crime drama Numb3rs, and had a small role her brother's film, Sex Drive.

In May 2008, Anders was cast in the satirical workplace comedy Better Off Ted, after creator Victor Fresco was impressed with her work on The Class. She played Linda Zwordling, the love interest for main character Ted Crisp, played by Jay Harrington, and a co-worker of his at an evil megacorporation. The series was a mid-season replacement, premiering to low rating in March 2009, but critical acclaim kept the show going and even renewed for a second season, though it would be cancelled and pulled from the air with the last two episodes of that season unaired. The show enjoyed a mini-reunion in 2011 through the music video for "Revenge of the Nerds", a rap song recorded by co-star Malcolm Barrett under the stage name "Verbal", which features all the main actors from the series in cameos either as their characters or, in the case of Anders, new characters.

In April 2009, shortly after Better Off Ted premiered, Anders joined the cast of The Big D, a sitcom project centered on a New York City couple – played by Anders and Ben Koldyke – who move to Dallas, where the husband is from, and where the wife consistently clashes with her southern belle mother-in-law. Despite her character being central to the premise, Anders was billed as a guest star in case she'd have to work on The Big D and Better Off Ted at the same time, with the latter having precedence. This issue was moot, as CBS did not pick up the series.

In February 2010, Anders was cast in Mr. Sunshine, marking the return to comedy television for Friends star Matthew Perry. Anders played Alice, the tomboyish co-worker and friend with benefits who's looking for more commitment from Perry's character. It premiered as a midseason replacement the following February, but was cancelled by ABC just three months.

Right after Mr. Sunshine's cancellation, Anders appeared in a four episode story arc in the first season of USA Network's series Necessary Roughness, as a former girlfriend of Marc Blucas' character.

In the years following Mr. Sunshine, Anders starred as a lead in a string of sitcom pilots, none of which were picked up to series. First was Ladyfriends in 2012, for NBC, centered on two best friends leading very different lives, portrayed by Anders and Minnie Driver. In 2013, ABC did not pick up Divorce: A Love Story, an adaptation of the long-running Israeli sitcom Ha-Chaim Ze Lo Hacol, about a happily divorced couple played by Anders and Jason Jones. In 2014, CBS did not pickup the proposed Cuz-Bros, in which Anders was cast as an anchorwoman and co-worker of Geoff Stults' character. In 2015, Anders starred in two more failed pilots. First was How We Live, where Anders played a stay-at-home mom and best friend of the female lead, played by Briga Heelan. Next was The Half of It, where Anders portrayed the ex-wife of Jon Dore's character. In 2016, she starred in the failed pilot for the sitcom Crunch Time, as the creator and producer of a game show hosted by Craig Ferguson's character.

In between acting in these television pilots, Anders had roles in a number of other projects. In 2012, she filmed a supporting part in the fact-based television film Return to Zero, which premiered on the Lifetime Network in 2014. She had recurring roles in the one season each of comedy series About a Boy and of Modern Family, appearing in the latter as the obnoxious new neighbor of the Dunphy family. In 2016, she was the main character in the comedy film Is That a Gun in Your Pocket?, where women in a small Texas town withhold sex until their partners dispose of their guns. That same year, she also did a guest spot on the first season of Speechless, a sitcom led by Minnie Driver, her co-star from the failed Ladyfriends pilot.

In 2019, she appeared as the aunt of Sophia Lillis' character in the film Nancy Drew and the Hidden Staircase, and as the mother of Elizabeth Lail's character in the film Countdown, the latter produced by her brother Sean. That same year, Anders played the starring role in the sitcom Mr. Mom, which was cancelled after 11 episodes.

== Personal life ==
Anders met actor Matt LeBlanc in 2004 while co-starring as his neighbor and eventual love interest on Joey and the pair eventually embarked on a relationship which was confirmed in 2006 following LeBlanc's split from his wife Melissa McKnight. After over eight years as a couple, LeBlanc announced at the start of 2015 that he and Anders had been broken up for several months.

She gave birth to her daughter, Audrey, with partner Jason Keller, in 2017.

On September 15, 2016, Anders and her older brother Sean were inducted into their high school's hall of fame, at the DeForest Area High School's Performing Arts Center.

== Filmography ==
Year	Title	Role	Notes
1998	One Life to Live	Elaine	Unknown episodes
2001	Guiding Light	Ellie	Unknown episodes
2001	Law & Order	Emily Hoyt	Episode: "The Fire This Time"
2003	Oz	Donna Degenhart	5 episodes
2003	Spellbound	Female lead	Unaired pilot
2004	The Stepford Wives	Heather	
2004	News To Me	Emma Leeds	Unaired pilot
2004	Tru Calling	Fake Chris Berensen/Kathy	Episode: "Rear Window"
2004–2006	Joey	Alexis "Alex" Garrett	Main role
2005	Never Been Thawed	Christian Band Slut	
2006–2007	The Class	Nicole Allen (née Campbell)	Main role
2008	Numb3rs	Rena Vining	Episode: "Power"
2008	Sex Drive	Brandy	
2009	The Big D	Jane Dupree	Unaired pilot
2009–2010	Better Off Ted	Linda Zwordling	Main role
2011	Mr. Sunshine	Alice	Main role
2011	Necessary Roughness	Laura Radcliffe	4 episodes
2012	Ladyfriends	Nicole Lambert	Unaired pilot
2013	Divorce: A Love Story	Robin	Unaired pilot
2014	Return to Zero	Trish	TV movie
2014	Cuz-Bros	Stacey	Unaired pilot
2014–2015	About a Boy	Joanne	3 episodes
2014–2015	Modern Family	Amber LaFontaine	4 episodes
2015	How We Live	Natalie Harris	Unaired pilot
2015	The Half of It	Megan	Unaired pilot
2016	Is That a Gun in Your Pocket?	Jenna Keely	
2016	Speechless	Audrey	Episode: "T-H-A-- THANKSGIVING"
2016	Crunch Time	Emily	Unaired pilot
2017	Daddy's Home 2	Principal Hayes	
2018	9JKL	Lauren	Episode: "Heavy Meddling"
2018	Instant Family	Jessie	
2018–2023	Young Sheldon	Linda	6 episodes
2019	Nancy Drew and the Hidden Staircase	Hannah	
2019	The Good Fight	Cheryl Lamore	2 episodes
2019	Mr. Mom	Megan Anderson	Main role
2019	Countdown	Jamie Harris	
2020–present	Ted Lasso	Michelle Lasso	Recurring role
2021	Big Shot	Arielle	Episode: "Beth Macbeth"
2021	Cruel Summer	Joy Wallis	Recurring role
2022	The Conners	Helen	2 episodes
2022	Spirited	Carrie	
2023	Carol & the End of the World	(voice)	Episode: "The Distraction"
2023–2025	Bookie	Sandra	Main role
2023–2024	That '90s Show	Sherri Runck	Recurring role
2024	Extended Family	Kristin	Episode: "The Consequences of Writing Things Down"
2025–2026	Leanne	Becca	3 episodes
