= John Morris (filmmaker) =

American film screenwriter and producer

- Born: John William Morris; February 23, 1969 (age 57); Elmhurst, Illinois, U.S.
- Occupations: Film screenwriter; Producer
- Years active: 2005–present
- Notable work: Spirited; Daddy's Home; We're the Millers

John William Morris (born February 23, 1969) is an American film screenwriter and producer best known for his collaborations with director Sean Anders, including Spirited (2022), Daddy's Home (2015), and We're the Millers (2013).

== Career ==
In 2005, he began his writing career by drafting the screenplay for the faux documentary film Never Been Thawed. In 2008, he co-wrote the raunchy comedy film Sex Drive. He co-wrote 2010's Hot Tub Time Machine and She's Out of My League. The following year, he wrote the family film Mr. Popper's Penguins.

He gained notability from scripting the 2013 comedy film We're the Millers. In 2014, he drafted the comedy film sequels Horrible Bosses 2 and Dumb and Dumber To. He wrote the 2015 film Daddy's Home and its 2017 sequel. In 2018, he scripted the comedy film Instant Family. He co-wrote the Christmas film Spirited (2022).

== Filmography ==
Year	Film	Writer	Producer	Notes
2005	Never Been Thawed	Yes	No	Also actor
2007	Playing Chicken	Yes	Executive	
2008	Sex Drive	Yes	Yes	
2010	Hot Tub Time Machine	Yes	Yes	
2010	She's Out of My League	Yes	No	
2011	Mr. Popper's Penguins	Yes	No	
2012	That's My Boy	No	Executive	
2013	We're the Millers	Yes	No	
2014	Horrible Bosses 2	Yes	Yes	
2014	Dumb and Dumber To	Yes	No	
2015	Daddy's Home	Yes	Yes	
2017	Daddy's Home 2	Yes	Yes	
2018	Instant Family	Yes	Yes	co-written with Anders; co-produced with Anders, Mark Wahlberg, Stephen Levinson and Eric Kissack
2019	Countdown	No	Yes	
2022	Spirited	Yes	Yes	
