= Mr. Popper's Penguins (film) =

2011 comedy film directed by Mark Waters

- Theatrical release poster
- Directed by: Mark Waters
- Screenplay by: Sean Anders; John Morris; Jared Stern
- Based on: Mr. Popper's Penguins by Richard and Florence Atwater
- Produced by: John Davis
- Starring: Jim Carrey
- Cinematography: Florian Ballhaus
- Edited by: Bruce Green
- Music by: Rolfe Kent
- Production companies: Dune Entertainment; Davis Entertainment
- Distributed by: 20th Century Fox
- Release date: June 17, 2011
- Running time: 94 minutes
- Country: United States
- Language: English
- Budget: $55 million
- Box office: $187.4 million

Mr. Popper's Penguins is a 2011 American Live-action/animated comedy film starring Jim Carrey, loosely based on the 1938 children's book. Produced by Davis Entertainment Company and Dune Entertainment and distributed by 20th Century Fox, it was directed by Mark Waters and written by Sean Anders, John Morris and Jared Stern. The film was originally slated for a release on August 12, 2011, but was moved up to June 17, 2011. The film received mixed reviews from critics and earned $187.3 million on a $55 million budget.

== Plot ==
In an opening flashback, Tom Popper Jr. is a child whose father traveled around the world during his childhood in the 1970s. Tom rarely sees his father, Tom Sr., during his travels and communicates with him through shortwave radio.

In the present day, Tom is a divorced real estate entrepreneur and a father of two children, Janie and Billy. After returning home from work one day, Tom learns that his father has died during an adventure to Antarctica, and, as per his will, has left him with a "souvenir" from his adventures in Antarctica. The following week, a crate containing a gentoo penguin, named Captain, appears at his door. Tom immediately becomes annoyed with the penguin and locks her in a bathroom before going to work. After Captain accidentally floods his apartment with bath water, Tom calls his father's organization asking to return the penguin, but, due to a miscommunication, ends up receiving a shipment of five more penguins named Loudy, Bitey, Stinky, Lovey, and Nimrod.

Tom intends to give them away to the zoo, but changes his idea when his children think that the penguins are Billy's birthday present. An incensed Tom is forced to spend evenings taking care of the penguins and bribing the apartment clerk not to rat him out to the board, as pets are not allowed in the apartment. At one point, he receives an offer to take the penguins off his hands from Nat Jones, the antagonistic zookeeper at the New York Zoo, who warns him that the penguins won't survive at his house. Unknown to Tom, Nat also plans to trade the penguins with other zoos for animals that his zoo does not have.

At work, Tom is given the task of buying Tavern on the Green, the only privately owned piece of real estate in Central Park that is an old restaurant where he used to eat with his father when he was a child. However, the restaurant's elderly owner, Selma Van Gundy, will only sell it to a person of true value. Tom has meetings with her, but due to him having to juggle them with taking care of the penguins, she begins to have some serious doubts about him.

As time goes on, having the penguins around helps Tom become closer to his children. The penguins lay three eggs. Two eggs hatch, but one does not. Tom becomes obsessed with seeing the last egg hatch, causing him to lose his job. Eventually Tom sadly realizes that the egg will never hatch, and, after being given permission from Nat to do so, decides to donate the penguins to the zoo. Then, he is re-employed but his children and ex-wife, Amanda, are disappointed by his decision.

Tom finds a letter from his father—included in the original crate with Captain but lost when Tom broke the crate by accident—telling him to hold his children close and love them and apologizing for not being a better father that Tom needed. Having second thoughts, Tom asks his children and former wife to help him get the penguins back from the zoo, however, they are not in the penguin enclosure. During a brief argument with Nat, he reveals to them his true motives for wanting the penguins and that he plans to separate them. After Nat lies and says that they're too late to save them, the family manages to find and free the penguins. Nat and the zoo's security give chase, but the Poppers manage to escape with the penguins and flee to the restaurant, where they are confronted by Nat and the police. Upon seeing how Tom had reunited his family and saved the penguins, Van Gundy sells him the restaurant while Nat is arrested. Tom decides to renovate and reopen the restaurant. Tom and his family travel to Antarctica with the penguins, allowing them to live with their own kind. Tom's first penguin, Captain, is revealed to have laid another egg. Tom tells his children that they will visit the penguins when the egg hatches.

== Cast ==
- Jim Carrey as Tom Popper Jr.
  - Henry Kelemen / Dylan Clark Marshall as Young Tom Popper Jr.
- Carla Gugino as Amanda Popper
- Madeline Carroll as Janie Popper
- Maxwell Perry Cotton as Billy Popper
- Clark Gregg as Nat Jones
- Angela Lansbury as Mrs. Selma Van Gundy
- Ophelia Lovibond as Mrs. Pippi Pepenopolis
- Philip Baker Hall as Mr. Franklin
- Dominic Chianese as Mr. Reader
- William Charles Mitchell as Mr. Yates
- Jeffrey Tambor as Mr. Gremmins
- David Krumholtz as Kent
- Desmin Borges as Daryl
- James Tupper as Rick
- Betsy Aidem as Tavern hostess
- Matthew Wolf as Antarctic Friend (voice)
- Brian T. Delaney as Young Tom Popper Sr. (voice)
- Charles L. Campbell as Old Tom Popper Sr. (voice)
- Frank Welker as the penguins (vocal effects) (Uncredited)

== Production ==
New Line Cinema had attempted to produce an adaptation of the story in 1994, with an estimated budget of $20 million. The film was to be directed by Brian Henson, who would also produce alongside Craig Zadan and Neil Meron, while the script was being written by Heide Perlman, with rewrites by Josann McGibbon and Sara Parriott. This version never entered production, and the rights eventually lapsed.

In 2009, 20th Century Fox acquired the screen rights to the book, hiring Sean Anders and John Morris to write the script. Noah Baumbach and Ben Stiller originally considered joining the film as director and lead respectively, but they would never fully commit. Owen Wilson, Jack Black, and Jim Carrey were all considered to play the lead role, with it eventually going to Carrey. Mark Waters was chosen to direct in June 2010. Filming began in October 2010, and finished in January 2011. On September 21, 2010, it was confirmed that Carla Gugino had joined the cast as Tom's former wife Amanda Popper. Rhythm and Hues Studios did the penguin animations for certain shots. The musical score was composed by Rolfe Kent and orchestrated by Tony Blondal. It was recorded at the scoring stage at 20th Century Fox in Century City, California with a 78-piece orchestra. An online Museum Slide Game was created by designer Mark Kavanaugh as promotional material for the film.

The penguins portrayed in the film were a mix of real penguins and CGI.

== Reception ==
=== Box office ===
Mr. Popper's Penguins was theatrically released on June 17, 2011, by 20th Century Fox. It earned $6.4 million on opening day and $18.4 million over the three-day weekend, ranking in third place behind Green Lantern and Super 8. The opening was at the high end of 20th Century Fox's expectations, which was predicting a mid-to high teens opening.

In its second weekend, the film faced competition from Cars 2 and dropped 45% to $10.1 million and ranked in fifth place. Over the four-day Independence Day holiday weekend, it ranked in eighth place after dropping 34% to $6.7 million. The film earned $68,224,452 domestically and $119,137,302 in foreign countries, grossing a total of $187,361,754 worldwide.

=== Critical response ===
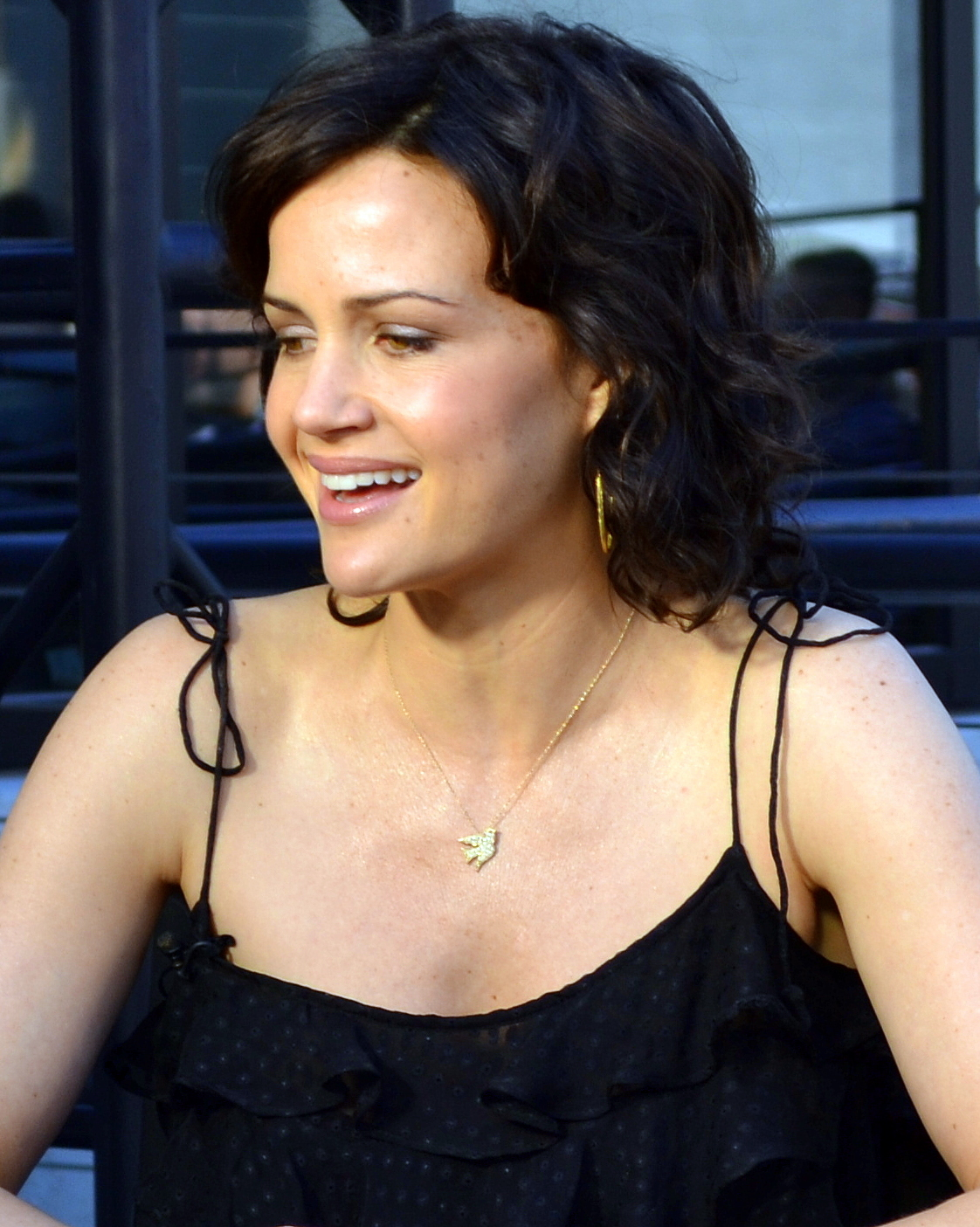
Carla Gugino was praised by critics for her performance.

On Rotten Tomatoes, the film has an approval rating of 47% based on 142 reviews with an average rating of 5.2/10. The site's critical consensus reads, "Blandly inoffensive and thoroughly predictable, Mr. Popper's Penguins could have been worse – but it should have been better." On Metacritic, the film has a score of 53 out of 100 based on 30 critics, indicating "mixed or average reviews". Audiences polled by CinemaScore gave the film an average grade of "A−" on an A+ to F scale.

=== Accolades ===
BMI Film & TV Awards 2012

Award	Category	Nominee	Result
BMI Film Music Award	Film Music	Rolfe Kent	Won

Kids' Choice Awards, USA 2012

Award	Category	Nominee	Result
Blimp Award	Favorite Movie Actor	Jim Carrey For playing "Mr. Popper".	Nominated

MovieGuide Awards 2012

Award	Category	Nominee	Result
Grace Award and Best Film for Families	Most Inspiring Performance in Movies	Jim Carrey	Nominated

== Release ==
=== Home media ===
Mr. Popper's Penguins was released on Blu-ray and DVD on December 6, 2011. It includes a short film called Nimrod and Stinky's Antarctic Adventure.

=== Soundtrack ===
- "Lucy in the Sky with Diamonds" – Written by John Lennon and Paul McCartney
- "Let It Snow! Let It Snow! Let It Snow!" – Written by Jule Styne and Sammy Cahn
- "Sweet N' Lo" – Written by Erwin Lehn
- "Doo Wah Dooh Wah" – Written and Performed by Syd Dale
- "Set 'Em Up Joe" – Written by Werner Tautz
- "Spin Spin" – Written by Steve Sidwell
- "Go Get It" – Written and Performed by Jeff Cardoni
- "Piano Lounge" – Written by Daniel May and Marc Ferrari
- "Ice Ice Baby" – Performed by Vanilla Ice
- "All Music" – Composed by Rolfe Kent
- Music from the Charles Chaplin movies
