= We're the Millers =

2013 film by Rawson Marshall Thurber

- Theatrical release poster
- Directed by: Rawson Marshall Thurber
- Screenplay by: Bob Fisher; Steve Faber; Sean Anders; John Morris
- Story by: Bob Fisher; Steve Faber
- Produced by: Chris Bender; Vincent Newman; Tucker Tooley; Happy Walters
- Starring: Jennifer Aniston; Jason Sudeikis; Emma Roberts; Nick Offerman; Kathryn Hahn; Ed Helms
- Cinematography: Barry Peterson
- Edited by: Mike Sale
- Music by: Theodore Shapiro; Ludwig Göransson
- Production companies: New Line Cinema; Newman/Tooley Films; Slap Happy Productions; Heyday Films; BenderSpink
- Distributed by: Warner Bros. Pictures
- Release dates: August 3, 2013 (Traverse City Film Festival); August 7, 2013 (United States)
- Running time: 110 minutes
- Country: United States
- Language: English
- Budget: $37 million
- Box office: $270 million

We're the Millers is a 2013 American comedy road film directed by Rawson Marshall Thurber and starring Jennifer Aniston, Jason Sudeikis, Emma Roberts, Will Poulter, Nick Offerman, Kathryn Hahn, Molly Quinn, and Ed Helms. The film's screenplay was written by Bob Fisher, Steve Faber, Sean Anders, and John Morris, based on a story by Fisher and Faber. The plot follows a small-time pot dealer (Sudeikis) who convinces his neighbors to help him by pretending to be his family in order to smuggle drugs from Mexico into the United States.

The film premiered at the Traverse City Film Festival on August 3, 2013 and was released on August 7, 2013, by Warner Bros. Pictures. Despite mixed reviews, it was a box office success, grossing $270 million worldwide against a $37 million budget during its theatrical run. It was nominated for four People's Choice Awards, and six MTV Movie Awards, winning two.

== Plot ==
In Denver, low-level marijuana dealer David Clark is robbed of his money and stash, some of which he owes to his supplier and college acquaintance Brad Gurdlinger. Gurdlinger forces him to smuggle marijuana from Mexico to clear his debt. Realizing that attempting to get through customs alone would be suspicious, David hires his neighbors—a stripper stage-named Rose; local runaway Casey; and naïve, recently abandoned teenager Kenny—to pose as his wife, daughter, and son respectively, dubbing themselves the "Millers".

When the Millers reach the compound, they learn it is not "a smidge" as Gurdlinger described, but two tons. They are stopped by authorities twice, but get by on bribery and sheer luck. Due to the extra load from the marijuana on the RV, one of the radiator hoses breaks. The Fitzgeralds (consisting of father Don, mother Edie, and daughter Melissa), a family actually vacationing in an RV whom the Millers had encountered at the border, catch up to them and tow them to a repair shop. On the way, they learn that Don is a DEA agent, alarming them.

Kenny develops a crush on Melissa. After he reveals that he has never kissed a girl, Casey and Rose give him kissing lessons while David films; Melissa walks in on them and assumes they are in an incestuous relationship.

Gurdlinger misled David, as the marijuana is stolen from cartel boss Pablo Chacon. The next day, when the Millers head to the shop for the RV, Chacon and his henchman One-Eye are waiting for them. As he prepares to kill the Millers, they disclose they are not a real family and did not know they were stealing from him. Rose is given a chance to prove that she is a stripper by dancing in her underwear, and when she gets close to Chacon, she turns a steam vent onto him. The Millers then escape in the RV, with Kenny behind the wheel.

Due to Kenny's erratic driving, the RV veers off the highway and crashes. In the commotion, a tarantula that snuck aboard the RV in Mexico crawls up Kenny's leg and bites his testicles, resulting in him being hospitalized. This setback further delays the delivery of the marijuana, but David renegotiates with Gurdlinger for a fee of $500,000 on the condition he arrives that night.

When Kenny is finally released from the hospital, David rushes him to the RV in a wheelchair and accidentally tips him over. In the ensuing argument, David inadvertently reveals how much he is getting paid, in comparison to how little he offered to pay each of the others. Disgusted by the revelation, Rose, Casey, and Kenny part company with him. David drives away, leaving them at the local carnival, but later regrets abandoning them and returns.

After David apologizes to the trio for not being upfront with them, they agree to rejoin him to get home. As the Millers make their way to the RV, One-Eye finds them but, before he can shoot them, Don comes out of his camper and subdues him. Chacon then comes around the corner with Melissa held at gunpoint and is about to kill them all; however, he is momentarily distracted by the 4th of July fireworks, so David and Kenny subdue him. Kenny kisses Melissa, prompting David to kiss Rose. Don arrests Chacon but lets the Millers leave.

Gurdlinger reveals that he never intended to pay David for smuggling the marijuana. When David delivers it to him, DEA agents arrive and take him into custody thanks to David's tip. Don tells David that he and any witnesses of the crime will be placed into witness protection until Gurdlinger and Chacon's trials. Later, the Millers, now under witness protection together, are living in a suburban house with marijuana plants growing in the backyard.

== Cast ==
- Jason Sudeikis as David Clark/David Miller, a drug dealer who forms the Millers. He poses as Rose's husband and as Casey and Kenny’s father.
- Jennifer Aniston as Rose O'Reilly/Rose Miller/Sarah, a stripper hired by David to pose as his wife and as the mother of his hired kids, Casey and Kenny. She later becomes David's love interest.
- Will Poulter as Kenny Rossmore/Kenny Miller, a socially awkward 18-year-old neighbor of David's who is hired to pose as his and Rose's teenage son.
- Emma Roberts as Casey Mathis/Casey Miller, a 21-year-old runaway and thief hired by David to pose as his and Rose's teenage daughter.
- Ed Helms as Brad Gurdlinger, a drug lord who hires David to smuggle marijuana from Mexico to the United States.
- Nick Offerman as Don Fitzgerald, Edie's husband, Melissa's father, and a DEA agent who befriends the Millers.
- Kathryn Hahn as Edith "Edie" Fitzgerald, Don's wife and Melissa's mother.
- Molly C. Quinn as Melissa Fitzgerald, Don and Edie's teenage daughter and Kenny's love interest.
- Tomer Sisley as Pablo Chacon, a Mexican drug lord.
- Matthew Willig as One-Eye, Pablo's henchman.
- Luis Guzmán as a Mexican cop who demands a bribe from the Millers.
- Thomas Lennon as Rick Nathanson, a former college classmate of David's.
- Mark L. Young as Scottie P, a kiddie ride attendant who befriends and later sexually harasses Casey.
- Ken Marino as Todd, the sleazy owner of the strip club where Rose works.
- Laura-Leigh as Kymberly, one of Rose's fellow strippers.
- Scott Adsit as Doctor.
- Sam Richardson as TSA Agent.

== Production ==
The development of the movie first began in 2002. New Line Cinema acquired the script in 2004 In March 2005, Peter Cattaneo had signed on to direct, and Will Arnett entered talks to play David Clark later in November. In February 2006, Steve Buscemi was reported to join. The film ended up in development hell until 2010 when a new draft was produced by Dan Fybel and Rich Rinaldi. Burr Steers and eventual rewriters Sean Anders and John Morris were considered to replace Cattaneo. Rawson Marshall Thurber signed on as director in 2011, and Jason Bateman became attached as the lead two months later. In April 2012, Jennifer Aniston and Jason Sudeikis joined the cast. Emma Roberts, Will Poulter, Ed Helms and Kathryn Hahn were added in July.

Production began in Wilmington, North Carolina, on July 23, 2012. Filming also took place in Kewa Pueblo, New Mexico. It was presented at the 2013 Traverse City Film Festival.

== Release ==
The film was released in theaters on August 7, 2013, in the United States, and on August 23, 2013, in the United Kingdom. It was released on September 18, 2013, in France, and was released on November 8, 2013, in Spain.

=== Home media ===
We're the Millers was released on Blu-ray and DVD on November 19, 2013, by Warner Home Video. The DVD was released as a two-disc special edition, containing two versions of the film: the original theatrical version, and the "unrated" extended cut with 8 minutes of new material and 45 minutes of featurettes, outtakes and deleted scenes.

== Reception ==
=== Box office ===
We're the Millers grossed over seven times its $37 million budget, earning over $150 million in North America and $119 million internationally for a worldwide total of $270 million.

=== Critical response ===
On Rotten Tomatoes, We're the Millers has an approval rating of 48% based on 157 reviews. The site's critical consensus reads, "We're the Millers squanders its potential with an uneven, lazily assembled story." On Metacritic, the film has a score of 44 out of 100 based on 38 critics, indicating "mixed or average reviews". Audiences polled by CinemaScore gave the film an average grade of "A−" on an A+ to F scale.

== Accolades ==
Year	Award	Category	Recipient	Result
2013	Key Art Awards	Best Trailer – Audio/Visual	Warner Bros., New Line Cinema, Trailer Park	Nominated
2014	People's Choice Awards	Favorite Movie Actress	Jennifer Aniston	Nominated
2014	People's Choice Awards	Favorite Comedic Movie Actress	Jennifer Aniston	Nominated
2014	People's Choice Awards	Favorite On-Screen Chemistry	Jennifer Aniston and Jason Sudeikis	Nominated
2014	People's Choice Awards	Favorite Comedic Movie	We're the Millers	Nominated
2014	British Academy Film Awards	BAFTA Rising Star Award	Will Poulter	Won
2014	Empire Awards	Best Male Newcomer	Will Poulter	Nominated
2014	MTV Movie Awards	Best Female Performance	Jennifer Aniston	Nominated
2014	MTV Movie Awards	Best Breakthrough Performance	Will Poulter	Won
2014	MTV Movie Awards	Best Shirtless Performance	Jennifer Aniston	Nominated
2014	MTV Movie Awards	Best Kiss	Emma Roberts, Will Poulter, Jennifer Aniston	Won
2014	MTV Movie Awards	Best Song from a Movie	Will Poulter – Waterfalls	Nominated
2014	MTV Movie Awards	Best Comedic Performance	Jason Sudeikis	Nominated
2014	Teen Choice Awards	Choice Movie Actress: Comedy	Emma Roberts	Won
2014	Teen Choice Awards	Choice Movie: Liplock	Emma Roberts, Jennifer Aniston, Will Poulter	Nominated
2014	Teen Choice Awards	Choice Movie: Hissy Fit	Jason Sudeikis	Nominated
2015	Casting Society of America	Big Budget Comedy	Lisa Beach, Sarah Katzman, Lisa Mae Fincannon, Jeremy Gordon, Beth Lipari, Dana Salerno	Nominated

== Canceled sequel ==
On February 25, 2014, Warner Bros. Pictures and New Line Cinema announced that a sequel to We're the Millers was in development, titled We're Still the Millers, with Adam Sztykiel writing the script. In March 2023, while promoting Murder Mystery 2, Jennifer Aniston confirmed that the sequel was scrapped.
