= Horrible Bosses 2 =

- Theatrical release poster
- Directed by: Sean Anders
- Screenplay by: Sean Anders; John Morris
- Story by: John Francis Daley; Jonathan Goldstein; Sean Anders; John Morris
- Based on: Characters by Michael Markowitz
- Produced by: Brett Ratner; Jay Stern; John Morris
- Starring: Jason Bateman; Charlie Day; Jason Sudeikis; Jennifer Aniston; Jamie Foxx; Chris Pine; Christoph Waltz
- Cinematography: Julio Macat
- Edited by: Eric Kissack
- Music by: Christopher Lennertz
- Production companies: New Line Cinema; Benderspink; RatPac Entertainment
- Distributed by: Warner Bros. Pictures
- Release dates: November 12, 2014 (London); November 26, 2014 (United States)
- Running time: 108 minutes
- Country: United States
- Language: English
- Budget: $42 million
- Box office: $107.7 million

Horrible Bosses 2 is a 2014 American crime comedy film directed by Sean Anders and written by Anders and John Morris. A sequel to 2011's Horrible Bosses, the film features Jason Bateman, Charlie Day, Jason Sudeikis, Jennifer Aniston, Jamie Foxx, Kevin Spacey, and Lindsay Sloane reprising their roles from the previous film, with Chris Pine and Christoph Waltz joining the cast.

The plot follows Nick, Kurt, and Dale as they kidnap the son of a billionaire investor in order to blackmail him, out of revenge after he screws them over on a business deal.

The film premiered in London on November 12, 2014, and was released by Warner Bros. Pictures on November 26, 2014. It received mixed reviews and grossed $107.7 million.

== Plot ==
Three years after the first film, Nick, Dale, and Kurt invent a car wash-inspired shower head, the "Shower Buddy". Bert Hanson and his son Rex approach them, and Bert agrees to invest if they can make 100,000 units.

With a business loan, the trio outfits a warehouse, hires staff, and produces the quota. However, Bert backs out, as he never signed an agreement. He then tells them that when they are unable to repay their $500,000 bank loan and they foreclose, he plans to buy their inventory at a knockdown price and sell their shower heads (renamed the "Shower Pal") himself.

Seeking financial advice, the three visit Nick's imprisoned former boss, Dave Harken, who says they have no feasible legal way to recover their losses. They then resolve to kidnap Rex for ransom. Asked for assistance, Dean "Motherfucker" Jones suggests keeping the victim unconscious the entire kidnapping. Their ransom note asks for $500,000. They go to the office of Dale's former boss, Dr. Julia Harris, to steal nitrous oxide. While there, Kurt and Dale are almost caught by members of Julia's sex addiction support group, but Nick arrives and manages to defuse the situation.

At Rex's, as all three hide in the closet, Dale accidentally knocks them out with the gas. Waking up in the morning, Rex is gone. Returning to their warehouse, they find Rex tied up in the trunk of their car. Getting out, Rex reveals he found them in his closet, figured out their intended plan, and staged his own kidnapping. He sent the ransom note to Bert, increasing the ransom to $5 million.

The three doubt Rex's plan, but he threatens to go to the police if they back out. They call Bert to inform him of Rex's kidnapping, threatening to kill him if the police get involved. However, the police, led by Detective Hatcher, subsequently arrive at the warehouse to question the suspects.

When the police leave, Rex breaks down over the fact that Bert cares more about his money than his son's life. Now sympathetic, the trio agree to do the fake kidnapping together. They plan to outsmart the police and get the ransom money using untraceable phones, a basement garage to block any tracking signal, and Kurt disguised as Bert.

While the plan is in motion, the trio realizes Kurt mistakenly left Bert his own phone instead of the untraceable one to give him instructions. Nevertheless, they use Kurt's phone. Before the trio can leave their stakeout hotel room, Julia arrives and demands Dale sleep with her, or she will report them for breaking into her office. Dale's wife, Stacy, and their three daughters unexpectedly arrive. Believing Dale is cheating with Julia, she storms off. Dale then angrily locks Julia in the bathroom, so they can leave.

In the basement garage, the trio demands Bert give them the money and the cell phone. However, Bert is killed by Rex, who reveals he was planning to betray them the whole time. However, after learning his father did not care about him, Rex decided to kill him, framing the trio so he could inherit everything. As the trio is pursued by the police, Jones arrives. Anticipating they would be killed at the hand-off, he was going to take the ransom money himself.

Jones drives them to the warehouse so they can prove their innocence. Upon arrival, Jones escapes with the money and the police find Rex tied up. Before the police can arrest the trio, Kurt's phone rings in Rex's pocket; the police recognize the ringtone as that left to Bert by the kidnappers. When Rex claims the phone is his, Detective Hatcher asks why he did not call the police if he had a phone, so Rex takes him hostage. When Dale attempts to attack Rex, he shoots him. Hatcher subdues and arrests Rex, thanks to the distraction.

Dale wakes up in the hospital. As he had helped save Hatcher's life, the charges were dropped. Julia helped with Stacy and the kids during Dale's recovery, but she hints at having raped Dale during his coma, and vows to have sex with Stacy as well. In the end, the trio's business does go into foreclosure, but Harken buys it, allowing them all to stay employed. Jones, meanwhile, uses the stolen ransom money to invest in Pinkberry.

== Cast ==
- Jason Bateman as Nick Hendricks
- Jason Sudeikis as Kurt Buckman
- Charlie Day as Dale Arbus
- Chris Pine as Rex Hanson
- Jennifer Aniston as Dr. Julia Harris
- Jamie Foxx as Dean "Motherfucker" Jones
- Kevin Spacey as David Harken
- Christoph Waltz as Bert Hanson
- Jonathan Banks as Detective Hatcher
- Lindsay Sloane as Stacy Arbus
- Keegan-Michael Key as Mike
- Kelly Stables as Rachel
- Jerry Lambert as Skip
- Brianne Howey as Candy
- Lennon Parham as Roz
- Suzy Nakamura as Kim
- Brandon Richardson as Blake
- Keeley Hazell as Miss Lang
- Bruno Amato as sex addict police officer
- Sam Richardson as Producer
- Andy Buckley as Surveillance Audio Agent
- Rob Huebel as Pinkberry Executive
- Brendan Hunt as sex addict
- Rebecca Field as sex addict
- Shelby Chesnes as jogger (Cameo)
- Will Forte as derelict (Cameo)

== Production ==
=== Development ===
Following the first film's release in July 2011, director Seth Gordon confirmed that talks were underway for a sequel due to the film's financial success in the US, saying: "Yeah, we've definitely discussed it. It's done well in the States, the film has, so that's becoming a more concerted effort now, we're trying to figure out what the sequel could be." In January 2012, it was confirmed that a sequel was moving forward and that screenwriters John Francis Daley and Jonathan Goldstein would be returning to write the script. At this time, New Line Cinema was reported to be negotiating with Gordon to return as director as well as with Jason Bateman, Charlie Day, and Jason Sudeikis to return in the lead roles.

In February 2012, it was confirmed that Goldstein and Daley were writing the new script. In March 2013, Goldstein and Daley confirmed that they had submitted multiple draft scripts for the sequel, and that production had moved towards finalizing the budget. Later in the same month, Bateman, Day, and Sudeikis were confirmed to be reprising their roles, with Jamie Foxx negotiating to return. The film was once again produced by Brett Ratner and Jay Stern.

In August 2013, it was announced that Gordon would not be returning to direct because of scheduling conflicts and that the studio was actively searching for a replacement. In September 2013, Sean Anders was announced as Gordon's replacement, with John Morris joining the production as a producer. The pair had previously performed a rewrite on Goldstein's and Daley's sequel script. In September 2013, Jennifer Aniston signed on to reprise her role as Julia Harris.

=== Filming ===
Principal photography took place in Burbank, California, between September 2013 and June 2014.

== Release ==
The first trailer was released on September 30, 2014. On September 27, 2013, it was announced that the film would be released on November 26, 2014.

== Home media ==
The film was released on DVD and Blu-ray in February 2015, by Warner Home Video. Like the first film, the Blu-ray release contains an extended version, which runs an additional eight minutes longer than the 108-minute theatrical cut.

== Reception ==
=== Box office ===
Horrible Bosses 2 grossed $54.4 million in North America and $53.2 million in other territories for a total worldwide gross of $107.7 million worldwide, against a budget of $42 million. This was just over half its predecessor's total gross of $209 million.

The film was released in 3,321 theaters in the United States and Canada on November 26, 2014. It earned $1 million from Tuesday night previews and $4.3 million (including previews) on its opening day. The next day on Thanksgiving Day it earned $3.1 million, for a two-day total of $7.3 million. On Friday the film earned $6.2 million. In its opening weekend it earned $15.5 million (a five-day total of $23 million), finishing fifth at the box office.

Outside North America, the film was released to 42 markets and earned $11.7 million from 4,900 screens. The highest debuts came from Russia ($2.3 million), the United Kingdom ($2 million), Mexico ($1.13 million) and Germany ($1 million).

=== Critical response ===
On Rotten Tomatoes, the film has an approval rating of 35% based on 154 reviews and an average rating of 4.6/10. The site's critical consensus reads, "Horrible Bosses 2 may trigger a few belly laughs among big fans of the original, but all in all, it's a waste of a strong cast that fails to justify its own existence." On Metacritic, the film has a score of 40 out of 100 based on 36 critics, indicating "mixed or average" reviews. Audiences polled by CinemaScore gave the film an average grade of "B+" on an A+ to F scale, the same grade earned by its predecessor.

Justin Lowe of The Hollywood Reporter said, "The jokes start growing stale well before the film's midpoint." Justin Chang of Variety called the film an "inane and incredibly tasteless sequel." Dan Callahan of TheWrap told that "the result is puerile, ugly and painfully unfunny." Moira MacDonald of The Seattle Times gave the film one and a half stars out of four, saying "Lots of gags fly by, many of them in questionable taste (some downright offensive) and most of them unfunny." Claudia Puig of USA Today gave the film one out of four stars, saying "This ill-conceived sequel to 2011's entertaining Horrible Bosses is base, moronic, insulting and vulgar. It's also cringingly unfunny."

Tom Russo of The Boston Globe gave the film two and a half out of four stars and said, "A new misadventure whose negligibly refined formula somehow ends up being more consistently entertaining." Stephen Holden of The New York Times said that the film is "one of the sloppiest and most unnecessary Hollywood sequels ever made, isn't dirtier or more offensive than its 2011 forerunner. But it is infinitely dumber and not half as funny."

Betsy Sharkey of Los Angeles Times said, "Make no mistake, despite some well-earned laughs, Horrible Bosses 2 is not what qualifies as a good movie or even a particularly good R-rated comedy." Joe Williams of St. Louis Post-Dispatch gave the film two out of four stars and said, "Horrible Bosses 2 is further proof that likable actors have to take an occasional sick day." James Berardinelli gave the film one and a half stars out of four and wrote for ReelViews, "Horrible Bosses 2 (emphasis on "horrible") is an apt title for this repugnant, unnecessary sequel."

== Future ==
In a 2014 interview when asked about the possibility about a third one, Jason Bateman said that they had to see how the reception to the second one would go. Jennifer Aniston as well expressed interest about getting Benedict Cumberbatch to star in a third one.

In 2015, Jason Bateman discussed what "went wrong with the film" on the WTF with Marc Maron podcast, noting that the film's release over Thanksgiving weekend likely played a part. He called the film "garbage, as far as box office goes," and he suggested that a sequel might not have been necessary.

In a 2022 interview with Charlie Day, when asked if a third Horrible Bosses film would happen he answered: "I'd love to do it, yeah you know, it's not up to me, but if it were up to me we would be filming soon".

In July 2025, Jennifer Aniston said that she had talked to Jason Bateman and Charlie Day about doing a third film, and that they were all interested in going back to the franchise. She said that she hoped a third one would "bring back the comedy genre". In August 2025, Charlie Day said that he had some conversations about doing a third film and would be up for it. In December 2025, Jason Bateman expressed an interest in doing a third film as well saying he'll "answer the phone if it rings".
