= Never Been Thawed =

- DVD cover
- Directed by: Sean Anders
- Written by: Sean Anders; Chuck LeVinus; John Morris
- Produced by: Evan Astrowsky; Gregg Ghelfi; Chuck LeVinus
- Starring: Allen Zwolle; Sean Anders; Shelly Frasier; Chuck LeVinus; John Morris
- Music by: Thomas Laufenberg; John Morris; Sean Anders
- Distributed by: Hart Sharp Video; Slippery Chicken Pictures (theatrical)
- Release date: April 15, 2005
- Running time: 88 minutes
- Country: United States
- Language: English
- Budget: $25,000
- Box office: $47,812

Never Been Thawed (sometimes referred to as NBT: Never Been Thawed) is a 2005 American independent film released on April 15, 2005. It takes its name from the best condition a frozen entree can be in according to the film's fictional Mesa Frozen Entree Enthusiast's Club. It was filmed in the Phoenix, Arizona metropolitan area by director Sean Anders on a budget of approximately $25,000. Various reviewers referred to the comedy as a mockumentary in the tradition of This Is Spinal Tap and Best in Show.

== Plot ==
The film revolves around the personal life of main character Shawn Anderson (played by writer-director Anders) and his two life pursuits, the Mesa Frozen Entree Enthusiast's Club and his band The Christers. The club is an eclectic group of people who collect frozen entrees. The film follows the group planning their first Frozen Entree Enthusiasts Convention and the power struggles between Shawn and wealthy group member Vince, who is also a corporate trainer who models his training seminars after Viet Cong prison camps. The Christers are Shawn's rock band. Formerly named The Reach Arounds, they have turned from hardcore punk rock to Christian rock, believing it will be easier to sign a record deal.

The story documents the interplay between Anderson and supporting characters. Shelly Toue is an "Intercourse Prevention Hotline" councilor who is obsessed with Shawn, but who has attracted the affection of Christers member Al McTavish, who works at a hair salon for children named Klown Kutz that requires him to dress up as a clown and go by the title "Smilist". The Christers are managed by Milo Bender (played by Phoenix realtor John Angelo), who also manages an anti-abortion cafe named the No Choice Cafe that he opened next door to a women's health clinic. Milo also organizes a music festival called Christapalooza where Shawn's band is supposed to play.

Other eclectic characters play minor roles in the plot. An effeminate firefighter named Scott has been "converted" to heterosexuality by a church ministry. He scavenges commemorative plates from house fires and displays them in his home. Shawn's deaf brother Chris hangs around in his underwear and routinely requests beer and cigarettes from Shawn via TDD telephone calls.

== Gags ==
Christian Profiteer Magazine

Never Been Thawed contains a number of gags intended to bolster its comedy. The principal gag is the absurd array of frozen entrees collected by members of the fictional club, including a "Gene Simmons Beef Tongue" meal. The members also store and display their entries in improbable ways, such as cramming a number of huge chest freezers into a tiny apartment. Another gag seen throughout the film is the music of Shawn's band, The Christers. A former punk rock band, they replace the word "fuck" in all of their lyrics with the word "pray" to make the transition to Christian rock. Matt participates in a competitive "Alphabet Game" league that involves driving around and locating the letters of the alphabet on road signs and billboards.

Visual gags that make brief appearances include the character Shelly working at the "William Jefferson Clinton Abstinence Center" and the character Matt wearing a portable bladder so he doesn't have to get up to urinate. Director Anders displays his skill as a graphic designer by placing posters; gag magazines such as The Christian Profiteer, Apathy Monthly, and Roadside Memorial, and other visuals throughout the film.

== Cast and crew ==
Anders and LeVinus cast friends and amateur actors for the film, which helped keep the budget low. Many of the people who worked as crew members on the film did double duty as actors, including Anders himself, who plays the lead role of Shawn Anderson. Los Angeles therapist and sometime actress Shelly Frasier plays Shelly Toue; Phoenix guitarist and teacher Allen Zwolle plays Al McTavish; producer Chuck LeVinus, who is also a Phoenix firefighter, plays Al's brother Chuck; and co-writer and composer John Morris plays Shawn's deaf brother Chris. Arizona politician Scott Isham agreed to play a gay firefighter in the film, believing that it would never be completed or screened anywhere. Anders' actress sister Andrea Anders has a cameo.

== Production and release ==
Never Been Thawed started as more of an experiment in filmmaking than a serious production, with Anders and LeVinus planning it as a "learning experience" before embarking on a real production. However, positive reactions at initial film festival screenings led to a successful project that turned a profit. The idea for the film came from some fictional biographies Anders wrote for his band, Stone Bogart. One of the biographies claimed that a member had a collection of frozen entrees in freezers in his apartment. People frequently e-mailed Anders about the biography, leading him to create a five-minute short film that eventually inspired the story for Never Been Thawed.

Anders and LeVinus filmed Never Been Thawed in more than 50 Phoenix area locations, including local cafes and wine bars, Squaw Peak, Anders' Mesa, Arizona home, and stretches of Interstate 10 between Phoenix and Casa Grande. They used DV camcorders for shooting more than 100 hours of footage and cast friends in the major roles, accomplishing the production in 18 months on an extremely low budget of $25,000. One of the only experienced actors in the film is Shelly Frasier.

The production team initially had problems getting film festivals to accept Never Been Thawed. The Silver Lake Film Festival eventually accepted the film, where Los Angeles Times reviewer Kevin Thomas saw it and subsequently gave it a good review. Thomas' review generated more festival interest, and the film screened at the Wisconsin Film Festival and the Sedona Film Festival in early April 2005. On April 15, 2005, Never Been Thawed premiered at Harkins Theatres Valley Art theater in Tempe, Arizona. The film ran for a total of eight weeks in Arizona, and in New York, Los Angeles, and Chicago.

== Reception ==
Never Been Thawed received praise for its independent approach to making a successful comedy and its use of "astute, straight-faced" acting to achieve comedic effect. Some reviewers criticized Anders' use of the film to make fun of various aspects of American culture such as Christian rock, abstinence education, and anti-abortion advocacy, and his heavy use of gags.

== Awards ==
- Jury Prize for Best Narrative Feature, Wisconsin Film Festival
- Breakout Filmmaker award, Sedona Film Festival
