= Spirited (film) =

2022 film by Sean Anders

- Release poster
- Directed by: Sean Anders
- Written by: Sean Anders; John Morris
- Based on: A Christmas Carol by Charles Dickens
- Produced by: Sean Anders; John Morris; Will Ferrell; Jessica Elbaum; David Koplan; George Dewey
- Starring: Will Ferrell; Ryan Reynolds; Octavia Spencer; Sunita Mani; Patrick Page; Andrea Anders; Marlow Barkley; Joe Tippett; Jen Tullock; Tracy Morgan
- Cinematography: Kramer Morgenthau
- Edited by: Brad Wilhite
- Music by: Dominic Lewis (score); Pasek and Paul (songs)
- Production companies: Apple Studios; Gloria Sanchez Productions; Two Grown Men; Maximum Effort
- Distributed by: Apple TV+ (under Apple Original Films)
- Release dates: November 11, 2022 (United States); November 18, 2022 (Apple TV+)
- Running time: 127 minutes
- Country: United States
- Language: English
- Budget: $75 million

Spirited is a 2022 American Christmas musical comedy film directed by Sean Anders, and written and produced by Anders and John Morris, with songs by Benj Pasek and Justin Paul. It is a modern retelling of Charles Dickens's 1843 novella A Christmas Carol and a satire of the various adaptations since. The film stars Will Ferrell, Ryan Reynolds, Octavia Spencer, Sunita Mani, Patrick Page, Andrea Anders, Marlow Barkley, Joe Tippett, Jen Tullock, and Tracy Morgan. In the film, the Ghost of Christmas Present is nearing retirement, which would mean a return to Earth, and sets his sights on an "unredeemable" man named Clint Briggs, who ends up helping the Ghost come to terms with his own past.

Spirited was released in select theaters in the United States on November 11, 2022, before its streaming release on November 18, 2022, by Apple TV+. The film received mixed reviews from critics, with the songs and performances and chemistry of Ferrell and Reynolds receiving praise. This film marks the final appearance of Judi Dench, who has a cameo role in it, before her retirement from acting in 2022.

== Plot ==
For nearly two centuries, Jacob Marley and the Ghosts of Christmas Past, Present, and Yet-to-Come have led a team of spirits to find and redeem one human soul every Christmas ("That Christmas Morning Feelin'"). Present has been eligible for retirement for decades but refuses to take it, despite being tempted by a second chance at life on Earth and making up for his own previous failures ("Present's Lament").

Scoping for a new soul to redeem, the spirits encounter Clint Briggs, a callous and manipulative media consultant, and witness him give a speech at a Christmas tree convention ("Bringin' Back Christmas"). Despite Marley's insistence that Clint is unredeemable, Present argues that his redemption could have a ripple effect and make him a force for positive change in humanity, citing Ebenezer Scrooge as a previous "unredeemable" who was successfully reformed. The Ghosts begin a year of research on Clint in preparation for the annual haunt.

As Christmas approaches, the Ghosts visit Clint's headquarters and witness him encouraging his young niece Wren, who is running for class president, to post an unflattering video of her opponent Josh. Clint's Executive Vice President, Kimberly Parks, who uncovered the video at his instruction, is riddled with guilt and almost quits but ultimately decides against it ("The View from Here"). Complicating matters, Kimberly is unexpectedly able to see Present, who finds himself attracted to her.

The haunt starts but quickly derails when Clint repeatedly interrupts Marley ("The Story of Your Life (Marley's Haunt)") and seduces a smitten Past, forcing Present to step in early and take over. Clint is initially dismissive of Present and resists his memories, particularly those of his difficult childhood in a neglectful home, his ex-girlfriend Nora, who broke up with him over his selfishness, and his older sister Carrie, who has since died of cancer. Realizing that Clint's case requires an unconventional approach, Present transports them into his own past and reveals that he was once Ebenezer Scrooge, the only other "unredeemable" to complete the program ("Good Afternoon"). Marley is furious and orders Present to stay on script.

Present takes Clint to Nora, happily celebrating Christmas with her husband and children, but Clint deduces that it is Present himself who longs for a happy family life with Kimberly ("The Story of Your Life (Clint's Pitch)"). Present dismisses this and instead shows him Josh's horrified reaction to Wren's reposting of his video. He then gets Clint to relive his most painful memory: Carrie's deathbed request that he raise Wren, which he had refused and passed off to their younger brother Owen.

As Present prepares to leave Clint with Yet-To-Come, Clint forces him to confront his fears about his own redemption, as Scrooge had died only three weeks after encountering the Ghosts. Clint convinces him to take retirement and give life on Earth another try ("Unredeemable"). The two wake up in Clint's apartment, and Present, now mortal, asks Kimberly on a date ("The View from Here (Riverwalk)"). Clint is then intercepted by Yet-to-Come and shown glimpses of a bleak future, including Josh's suicide.

Shaken, Clint races to stop Wren from posting the video. Just as he catches up to her, Kimberly reveals that she convinced Wren not to do it and quits her job. Present is jubilant and awaits Clint's congratulations from the spirit team but is confused when they fail to arrive. Clint argues that he only rectified a mistake and has not changed, but offers his friendship. Despondent and questioning his redemption, Present jumps in front of an oncoming bus, hoping to return to his job in the afterlife. Clint shoves him out of the way, and just before the bus hits, time freezes, and the spirits arrive to congratulate Clint for achieving redemption ("Do a Little Good"). However, when time resumes, the bus hits Clint, killing him. Carrie arrives to escort Clint to the afterlife, and while he is overjoyed to see his sister again, he is reluctant to leave Present behind. Instead, he makes a proposal to Marley.

Several years later, Clint has assumed the role of the Ghost of Christmas Present and is in a relationship with Past. He has expanded the program to include other holidays so the team can take on more perps every year and has brought Carrie on board as part of the staff. He also regularly visits Present, now married to Kimberly with two children, and the friends continue to work together redeeming souls. Wren has grown up and has been accepted into a master's program at Stanford ("That Christmas Morning Feelin' (Curtain Call)").

In a post-credit scene, the hotel manager from the Christmas tree convention is revealed to be the next "perp" chosen for redemption.

== Cast ==
- Will Ferrell as Ebenezer Scrooge, the current Ghost of Christmas Present
- Ryan Reynolds as Clint Briggs
  - Nico Tirozzi as young Clint Briggs
  - Thomas P. Gillis as future Clint Briggs
- Octavia Spencer as Kimberly Parks
- Sunita Mani as Bonnie, the Ghost of Christmas Past
- Patrick Page as Jacob Marley
- Marlow Barkley as Wren / Young Carrie
- Loren G. Woods as the Ghost of Christmas Yet to Come
  - Tracy Morgan as the voice of Yet to Come
- Aimee Carrero as Nora
- Joe Tippett as Owen Briggs
- Andrea Anders as Carrie Briggs
- Jen Tullock as Wendy Briggs
- Lily Sullivan as Margot / HR Ghost
- P. J. Byrne as Mr. Alteli
- Rose Byrne as Karen Blansky
- Maximilian Lee Piazza as Josh Hubbins
- Gavin Maddox Bergman as Oliver Twist
- Judi Dench as herself
- Jimmy Fallon as himself

== Production ==
On September 20, 2019, it was announced that Sean Anders and John Morris were attached to write and direct the film, as well as produce under their production company Two Grown Men, alongside Will Ferrell and Jessica Elbaum of Gloria Sanchez Productions, and George Dewey of Maximum Effort. The following month, it was announced that Apple TV+ had won a competitive bidding war for the rights to the film. Also it was reported that more than $60 million was spent on talent for the film, which was later increased to $75 million.

Alongside the initial announcement, Ferrell and Reynolds were cast in main roles. Both actors earned $20 million for their parts in the film. On February 8, 2021, Octavia Spencer joined the cast, with Reynolds confirmed as the lead and Ferrell playing the role of the Ghost of Christmas Present. In June, Sunita Mani was cast as Ghost of Christmas Past.

Principal photography for the film began on July 6, 2021, in Boston, which stood in for Manhattan. On October 18, 2021, Reynolds announced that filming had wrapped.

== Songs ==
No.	Title	Performer(s)	Runtime
1	"That Christmas Morning Feelin'"	Will Ferrell, Patrick Page, Sunita Mani, Tracy Morgan and Ensemble	3:02
2	"Present's Lament"	Ferrell	2:02
3	"Bringin' Back Christmas"	Ryan Reynolds and Ensemble	3:53
4	"Ripple"	Ferrell, Mani, Morgan, Page, and Ensemble	4:08 (Note: Only a brief portion of the song was performed in the main film; the rest of the production number was cut from the film's storyline, but the sequence is included in full during the closing credits.)
5	"The View from Here"	Octavia Spencer and Ferrell	3:06
6	"The Story of Your Life (Marley's Haunt)"	Page and Reynolds	1:50
7	"Good Afternoon"	Reynolds, Ferrell and Ensemble	4:27
8	"The Story of Your Life (Clint's Pitch)"	Reynolds and Ferrell	1:41
9	"Unredeemable"	Ferrell and Ensemble	3:31
10	"The View From Here (Riverwalk)"	Spencer and Ferrell	3:01
11	"Do a Little Good"	Reynolds, Ferrell, Page, Mani, Morgan, and Ensemble	3:41
12	"That Christmas Morning Feelin' (Curtain Call)"	Ferrell, Reynolds, Spencer, Morgan, Page, Andrea Anders, Marlow Barkley, Jen Tullock and Ensemble	2:28

== Release ==
Spirited had a limited theatrical release on November 11, 2022, followed by its digital release on Apple TV+ one week later, on November 18. A sing-along version was released theatrically on December 9, 2022. According to a Samba TV research panel of 3.1 million smart television households who tuned in for at least one minute, Spirited drew in 228,500 viewers in its first two days.

=== Promotion ===
A 12-inch vinyl single featuring songs from Spirited was announced for Record Store Day's annual Black Friday event in 2022. It featured the song "That Christmas Mornin' Feeling" sung by Ferrell as the A-side and "Do a Little Good" sung by Ferrell and Reynolds as the B-side.

== Reception ==
On the review aggregator website Rotten Tomatoes, 70% of 115 critics' reviews are positive, with an average rating of 6.40/10. The website's consensus reads: "Although it adds little to the long tradition of Dickens adaptations, Spirited is so genially overstuffed that it's easy to at least intermittently enjoy." Metacritic, which uses a weighted average, assigned the film a score of 55 out of 100, based on 25 critics, indicating "mixed or average" reviews.

Writing for the Pittsburgh Tribune-Review, Rob Owen found the film was perhaps too long with too much happening, commenting: "If you're re-telling the umpteenth version of the same story, it shouldn't take more than two hours to do it regardless of the detours and small surprises plotted."

== See also ==
- List of Christmas films
- Adaptations of A Christmas Carol
