= Sex Drive (film) =

2008 road sex comedy film by Sean Anders

- American theatrical release poster
- Directed by: Sean Anders
- Screenplay by: Sean Anders; John Morris
- Based on: All the Way by Andy Behrens
- Produced by: Bob Levy; Leslie Morgenstein; John Morris; Michael Nelson
- Starring: Josh Zuckerman; Amanda Crew; Clark Duke; Seth Green; James Marsden
- Cinematography: Tim Orr
- Edited by: George Folsey Jr.
- Music by: Stephen Trask
- Production company: Alloy Entertainment
- Distributed by: Summit Entertainment (United States); Contender Films (United Kingdom)
- Release dates: October 17, 2008 (United States); January 9, 2009 (United Kingdom)
- Running time: 109 minutes
- Countries: United States; United Kingdom
- Language: English
- Budget: $19 million
- Box office: $18.8 million

Sex Drive is a 2008 road comedy film directed by Sean Anders, written by Sean Anders and John Morris, and starring Josh Zuckerman, Amanda Crew, Clark Duke, Seth Green, and James Marsden. Based on the young adult novel All the Way by American author Andy Behrens, the film follows a high school graduate who goes on a road trip to have sex with a girl he met online. Katrina Bowden, Alice Greczyn, Michael Cudlitz, Dave Sheridan, and David Koechner appear in supporting roles.

Sex Drive was released in North America on October 17, 2008, and in the United Kingdom on January 9, 2009. The film received mixed reviews from critics, with the performances of Duke, Marsden, and Green receiving praise.

== Plot ==
Ian Lafferty is an 18-year-old recent high school graduate. He searches for a girl online, while making it seem as if he is attractive and strong, although he is in fact sweet and unassuming. He soon meets "Ms. Tasty", and agrees to meet her in person. She lives in Knoxville, Tennessee, while he lives in Bartlett, Illinois. With his best friends, Lance Nesbitt and Felicia Alpine, he goes to Knoxville in a 1969 Pontiac GTO Judge borrowed without permission from Ian's arrogant and macho older brother Rex.

On the way to Knoxville, they come across a hitchhiker, as the radiator in the Pontiac Judge overheats. They attempt urinating in the radiator in order to cool it, which only works briefly as they try to leave the hitchhiker in the dust. The hitchhiker leaves, frustrated at Ian's lack of concern for his well-being, but not before urinating on the car window. As Ian and Felicia wander to find help, Lance is waiting with the car when the Amish Ezekiel happens to pass by in his horse-drawn buggy. Ezekiel and his Amish buddies repair the car. At the same time, they join a Rumspringa party where Fall Out Boy are playing a concert, and at which Lance meets an attractive Amish girl named Mary. The three promise to return on the way back in order to do some work in return for getting their car fixed.

The trio arrives at a carnival where Ian finds himself in a bathroom stall with a glory hole, and hits it off with a female dancer who brings him to an Abstinence X Seminar, in which Ian is unwillingly forced to pledge. Ian blows off the girl, unaware she planned to pleasure him, which results in her throwing a lollipop in his direction, hitting Felicia in the face, chipping her tooth. They then visit the dentist to fix Felicia's tooth. They go to jail due to Ian throwing a tire iron into a police car, due to his increasing frustration after trying to put a possum that he hit out of its misery, and they are released after Mary pays the bail. Upon arriving in Knoxville, they find a hotel that sports a wide variety of role playing rooms. Rex, who has discovered the Judge missing, arrives angrily and insists that they go back and that Ian cannot visit Ms. Tasty. After Ian pretends to be gay, Rex allows him to see Ms. Tasty, hoping this encounter will change Ian's mind. Ian finally meets Ms. Tasty. However, when he tells her about Felicia, her seduction of Ian becomes a threat as her psychotic boyfriend Bobby Jo puts a gun to Ian's head. It becomes apparent that Ian was set up to be carjacked as his clothes and the Judge was stolen, leaving only the donut costume for Ian.

Lance and Mary arrive after having sex, as well as a redneck named Rick, whose girlfriend Brandy slept with Lance earlier. Felicia, however, is hiding in the car when Bobby Jo tries to steal it. Soon, a green car that has been continuously drag-racing with the Judge throughout the movie arrives. Ian manages to save Felicia, who then is able to run off and report to the police. Ms. Tasty tries to escape, but is stopped by the green car, whose drivers turn out to be Andy and Randy, two dim-witted self-declared "womanizers" from Ian's school, whom Ms. Tasty tried to manipulate into giving her the car. Bobby Jo is treated after being shot by Ian in self-defense. Felicia tells the police about the chop shop location and the couple is arrested.

Upon finding out that if Mary leaves the Amish community she will be shunned, Lance refuses to come back home and stays behind to marry Mary, while Ian and Felicia profess their love for each other. Ian and Felicia drive to a tree where Ian throws his shoes up into the tree, where Felicia threw her only pair of shoes into earlier. A few weeks later Ian is Felicia's date to her "evil" cousin's wedding which unexpectedly ends with the bride storming off. At Thanksgiving dinner, Rex tells his family that he is gay, which infuriates their father. On Christmas, they meet Rex's boyfriend. On New Year's Eve, Ian and Felicia have sex in Ian's basement on the couch under a blanket. In the final frame of the film, a picture is shown of Lance and Mary getting married, accompanied by Ian. Lance is shown sporting a beard exactly like Ezekiel's. During the credits, a short scene shows Ezekiel and Fall Out Boy arguing over the fact that the Amish fixed Fall Out Boy's tour bus for just "a five song set" in form for compensation, referring to a running gag throughout the movie.

== Cast ==
- Josh Zuckerman as Ian Lafferty
- Amanda Crew as Felicia Alpine
- Clark Duke as Lance Nesbitt
- Seth Green as Ezekiel
- James Marsden as Rex Lafferty
- Katrina Bowden as Ms. Tasty
- Alice Greczyn as Mary
- Michael Cudlitz as Rick
- David Koechner as Hitchhiker
- Dave Sheridan as Bobby Jo
- Mark L. Young as Randy
- Charlie McDermott as Andy
- Cole Petersen as Dylan Lafferty
- Allison Weissman as Becca
- Andrea Anders as Brandy
- José Duarte as Brandy's father
- Kim Ostrenko as Ian's stepmother
- Brett Rice as Mr. Lafferty
- Susie Abromeit as Tiffany
- Brian Posehn as Carney
- John Ross Bowie as Dr. Teddescoe
- Sasha Ramos as Kimberly
- Jessica Just as Lindsay
- Caley Hayes as Sandy
- Kyle Gass as Trucker
- Fall Out Boy as Themselves

== Production ==
Although Chicagoland and Knoxville, Tennessee are mentioned in the film, it was mostly filmed in South Florida, including Belle Glade and Boca Raton in Palm Beach County, and the Dolphin Mall in Sweetwater near Miami from 2007 to 2008.

== Soundtrack ==
- "Porcupine Jacket" by Tramps & Thieves
- "Time to Pretend" by MGMT
- "Fa-Fa-Fa" by Datarock
- "Let's Ride" by Airbourne
- "Bang Bang to the Rock n Roll" by Gabin
- The band Fall Out Boy also makes a cameo within the film, playing "Fame < Infamy", as well as, "Grand Theft Autumn/Where Is Your Boy Tonight (Acoustic)"
- "Life Is Beautiful" by Vega4
- "Let's Get It Up" by AC/DC
- "Message from Yuz" by Switches
- "My Prerogative" by Bobby Brown
- "Danger Zone" by Kenny Loggins
- "Disco Inferno" by The Trammps
- The film also features songs from Donovan, Jem, Hot Hot Heat, Switches, Pornosonic and Nitty.
- "Got You (Where I Want You)" by The Flys
- "I Don't Care" End credits by Fall Out Boy
- "You Love Me" by Teddy Tala

== Reception ==
=== Box office ===
Sex Drive grossed $3.6 million opening weekend, finishing in 9th place. It went on to gross $8.4 million in the United States and $10.4 million in other countries, for a total gross of $18.8 million, against its $19 million budget. It made a further $10 million in home media sales.

=== Critical response ===
On review aggregator Rotten Tomatoes, the film has an approval rating of 46% based on 109 reviews, with an average rating of 5.23/10. The site's critical consensus reads, "Sex Drive has some hilarious moments and is well made for a raunchy teen film, but will appeal to few beyond that demographic." On Metacritic the film has a weighted average score of 49 out of 100, based on reviews from 24 critics, indicating "mixed or average reviews".

Owen Gleiberman writing for Entertainment Weekly gave the film a grade B−, and suggests the appealing lead actors deserve a better movie, and particularly praises Seth Green for his performance. Cammila Albertson writing for TV Guide says it's good for its genre, "funny, it's lewd, and it's actually kind of creative" and although it is not art, it makes the effort to include plenty of extra crazy, random bits. Albertson concludes "all that matters is if it's funny—and it is", and gives the film 3 out of 4 stars.

Roger Ebert gave it 2 out of 4 stars, and wrote that although the film contained "some laughs [...] it is so raunchy and driven by its formula that you want to cringe". Nathan Rabin of The A.V. Club called it affably mediocre, and "a limp variation on a hoary old teen-film trope".

== Home media ==
The film was released on two-disc DVD and Blu-ray Disc February 24, 2009, both featuring the rated and unrated cuts of the film. Preceding the unrated cut, an intro by director Anders and some members of the cast explaining that the unrated cut is a "fan's cut" and to watch the original theatrical cut before viewing the unrated version. The cut features an additional 20 minutes of footage, including more profanity (about 20 additional uses of the word "fuck"), and both male and female full frontal nudity.
