= Sean Anders =

American film director and screenwriter (born 1969)

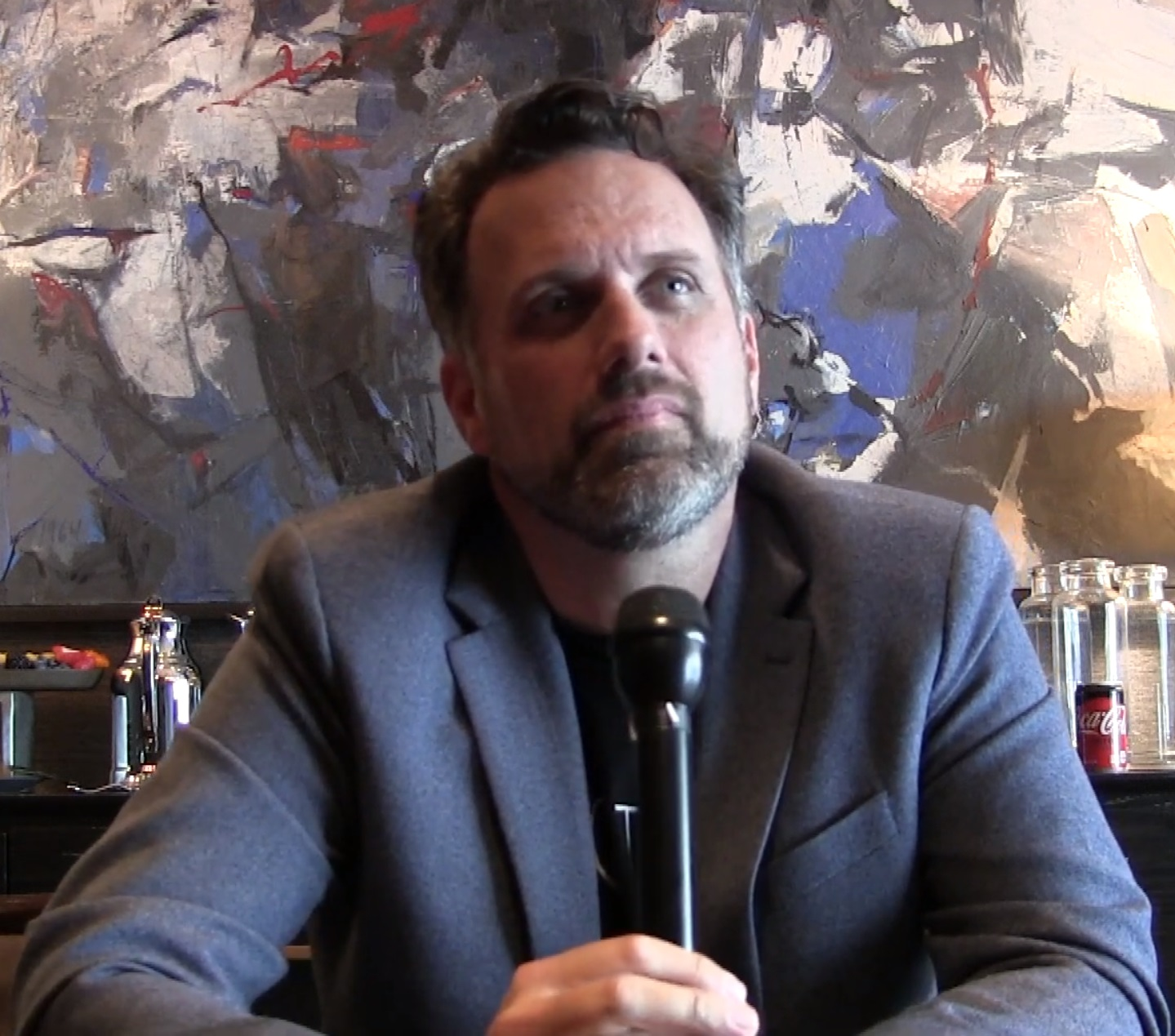
- Anders interviewed about Instant Family in 2018
- Born: June 19, 1969 (age 57); DeForest, Wisconsin, U.S.
- Occupations: Film director, screenwriter
- Relatives: Andrea Anders (sister)

Sean Anders (born June 19, 1969) is an American film director and screenwriter.

== Career ==
He co-wrote and directed the 2005 film Never Been Thawed, the 2008 film Sex Drive, the 2014 film Horrible Bosses 2, the 2015 film Daddy's Home, the 2017 sequel Daddy's Home 2, the 2018 film Instant Family based partly on his own history, and the 2022 holiday film Spirited. He also directed the 2012 comedy That's My Boy.

Anders wrote or co-wrote 2010's Hot Tub Time Machine and She's Out of My League, 2011's Mr. Popper's Penguins, 2013's We're the Millers, and the 2014 Dumb and Dumber sequel Dumb and Dumber To.

He is the brother of actress Andrea Anders.

== Filmography ==
Year	Title	Director	Writer	Producer	Notes
2005	Never Been Thawed	Yes	Yes	No	Also production designer and actor (role: Shawn Anderson)
2008	Sex Drive	Yes	Yes	No	
2010	Hot Tub Time Machine	No	Yes	No	
2010	She's Out of My League	No	Yes	No	
2011	Mr. Popper's Penguins	No	Yes	No	
2012	That's My Boy	Yes	No	No	
2013	We're the Millers	No	Yes	No	
2014	Horrible Bosses 2	Yes	Yes	No	
2014	Dumb and Dumber To	No	Yes	No	
2015	Daddy's Home	Yes	Yes	Executive	
2017	Daddy's Home 2	Yes	Yes	Executive	
2018	Instant Family	Yes	Yes	Yes	co-written with John Morris (filmmaker); co-produced with Morris, Mark Wahlberg, Stephen Levinson and Eric Kissack
2019	Countdown	No	No	Yes	
2022	Spirited	Yes	Yes	Yes	

== Accolades ==
For 2012's That's My Boy, Anders was nominated for Worst Director, at the 33rd Golden Raspberry Awards.
