= Daddy's Home (film) =

2015 buddy comedy film

- Theatrical release poster
- Directed by: Sean Anders
- Screenplay by: Brian Burns; Sean Anders; John Morris
- Story by: Brian Burns
- Produced by: Will Ferrell; Adam McKay; Chris Henchy; John Morris
- Starring: Will Ferrell; Mark Wahlberg; Linda Cardellini
- Cinematography: Julio Macat
- Edited by: Eric Kissack; Brad Wilhite
- Music by: Michael Andrews
- Production companies: Red Granite Pictures; Gary Sanchez Productions
- Distributed by: Paramount Pictures
- Release dates: December 9, 2015 (London); December 25, 2015 (United States)
- Running time: 96 minutes
- Country: United States
- Language: English
- Budget: $50 million
- Box office: $242.8 million

Daddy's Home is a 2015 American buddy comedy film directed by Sean Anders and written by Anders, Brian Burns, and John Morris. The film tells the story of a mild-mannered stepfather (Will Ferrell) who vies for the attention of his wife's (Linda Cardellini) children when their biological father (Mark Wahlberg) returns.

This is the second collaboration between Ferrell and Wahlberg following the 2010 film The Other Guys. Principal photography began on November 17, 2014, in New Orleans, Louisiana. The film was released on December 25, 2015, by Paramount Pictures and grossed $242 million worldwide, becoming Ferrell's highest-grossing live-action film. It received praise for the performances and chemistry between Ferrell and Wahlberg but faced criticism for its lack of funny ideas and not fully exploring the premise. A sequel, Daddy's Home 2, was released on November 10, 2017.

== Plot ==
Mild-mannered radio executive Brad Whitaker tries hard to be a good father to his wife Sara's children, Megan and Dylan, and is seemingly sterile after an accident to his testicles a couple of years ago. The kids are finally getting closer to him: Dylan confides in him about some older bullies at school and Megan asks him to take her to the school's father/daughter dance.

One night, however, Dusty Mayron, Sara's ex-husband and the kids' biological father, calls to announce he will be visiting the next day. Sara hesitates to let him into their home, but Brad convinces her it is important for the kids to see him and Dusty establish a respectful relationship.

When Dusty arrives, he immediately intimidates Brad with his tough and muscular appearance and his charm with Megan and Dylan. He talks Brad into letting him stay, despite Sara warning about his true nature. Brad soon wises up when it becomes clear he intends to reclaim his family by driving Brad away.

Dusty shows Brad up by getting the kids a dog, which Dusty names Tumor, and finishing a treehouse Brad and Dylan had been building. He also makes Brad seem racist after unwillingly firing handyman Griff after a fiasco with Dusty's motorcycle, and Dusty later invites Griff to move in with them. He tries to drive a wedge between Brad and Sara by taking them to a fertility doctor, hoping that Brad's inability to impregnate her will send her back into Dusty's arms.

Still, the two men appear to reach an understanding after jointly teaching Dylan how to defend himself from his bullies. Additionally, the couple is overjoyed to learn that Brad's sperm count has recovered, giving them hope of having a child together.

However, Brad is stunned when Dusty reveals he still intends to drive him out of the family. Desperate, Brad spends tens of thousands of dollars on gifts, including a pony for Megan, and $18,000 tickets to an NBA game for Dylan.

At the game, Dusty once again shows Brad up by revealing himself to be friends with the strength and conditioning coach of Dylan's favorite team, the Los Angeles Lakers. Brad is even more enraged when he learns that Megan has chosen Dusty to take her to the father/daughter dance instead of him.

During half-time, Brad is chosen to try to shoot a basketball from half-court to win a trip to Disney World. Drunk, he goes on a rant about Dusty before hitting a cheerleader and a disabled child in the face with a basketball. Disgraced, Brad moves out of the house. However, when Dusty tries to comfort Sara, she rejects him, and forces him to step up as a father to help his children with their busy schedules.

Four days later, Brad is living in his office at work, depressed. Dusty, meanwhile, is overwhelmed by the responsibilities of being a full-time father. When Dusty decides to leave on the day of Megan's dance, Griff convinces Brad to fight for his family.

Finding Dusty at a bar at the airport, he tries to get him to come back. Dusty admits that he cannot handle the hard parts about being a father and admires Brad for putting up with everything. Brad says that all of the terrible parts are worth it, because in the end, he is doing it for his kids. This convinces Dusty to go to the dance, and they arrive together.

At the dance, they discover the students who were bullying Dylan at school are girls. They almost fight the father of one of them when Dylan physically retaliates, as Brad and Dusty taught him to do, having assumed the bullies were boys. However, Dusty finally decides to follow Brad's lead on being a father, quelling the fight with a dance-off, while Dylan does the same thing with his bully. Brad and Sara reconcile, and Dusty decides to stay and "co-dad" for his kids.

One year later, the whole family is happy; Brad and Sara have a new baby boy named after Griff, and Megan and Dylan have finally accepted Brad as a father figure. Dusty has become wealthy, and is now friends with Brad. Dusty remarries to Karen, who has a daughter Adrianna, thus making Dusty a step-father himself. In an ironic twist of fate, he is now in exactly the same position that he put Brad in a year ago – visibly intimidated by Adrianna's more muscular father, Roger.

== Cast ==
- Will Ferrell as Brad Whitaker, Sara's husband, Dylan and Megan's father
- Mark Wahlberg as Dusty Mayron, Sara's ex-husband, Dylan and Megan's biological father
- Linda Cardellini as Sara Whitaker, Brad's wife, Dusty's ex-wife, Dylan and Megan's mother
- Scarlett Estevez as Megan Mayron Whitaker, Dusty and Sara's daughter, Dylan's sister, Brad's daughter
- Owen Vaccaro as Dylan Mayron Whitaker, Dusty and Sara's son, Megan's brother, Brad's son
- Thomas Haden Church as Leo Holt
- Hannibal Buress as Griff
- Bobby Cannavale as Dr. Emilio Francisco
- Bill Burr as Jerry
- Jamie Denbo as Doris
- Alessandra Ambrosio as Karen Mayron, Dusty's wife, Arianna's mother.
- Didi Costine as Adrianna, Dusty's daughter
- Mark L. Young as Dental hygienist
- Paul Scheer as DJ "The Whip"
- Billy Slaughter as Man in Squidward tie
- Chris Henchy as Jason Sinclair / Panda DJ
- Reba Elizabeth Carston as Serendipity
- LaMonica Garrett as Marco
- John Cena as Roger, Adrianna's biological father (cameo)
- Kobe Bryant as himself (cameo)

== Production ==
=== Development and casting ===
In May 2013, Vince Vaughn was revealed to have been cast in Paramount Pictures' Daddy's Home alongside Will Ferrell, who was also producing with Adam McKay for Gary Sanchez Productions, and Joe Drake and Nathan Kahane of Good Universe. Etan Cohen would direct from a script by himself, McKay, Brian Burns, and Chris Henchy.

In June 2014, Mark Wahlberg was approached to replace Vaughn, and Sean Anders took over directing duties while rewriting the script with John Morris. In November the same year, the film was officially moving forward, with Red Granite Pictures replacing Good Universe as a co-financer. That same month, Linda Cardellini and Hannibal Buress joined the cast of the film, to play Ferrell's character's wife and a sarcastic handyman, respectively. In January 2015, Paul Scheer was added to the cast of the film, playing The Whip, a crazy DJ.

=== Filming ===
Principal photography began on November 17, 2014, in New Orleans, Louisiana. On November 24 and 25, filming took place at Edward Hynes Charter School. On January 12, 2015, actors were spotted filming in the Lakeview area. On January 21, 2015, a scene was shot during a New Orleans Pelicans and Los Angeles Lakers game where Ferrell smashed a cheerleader (played by stuntwoman/wrestler Taryn Terrell) in the face with a basketball. Tony Hawk was the stunt double for Ferrell in a skateboarding scene, who got hurt on the set. Filming was scheduled to wrap on February 3, 2015, but lasted through February 6.

== Release ==
The film premiered in the United Kingdom on December 9, 2015, and was theatrically released in the United Kingdom on Boxing Day, December 26, 2015 by Paramount Pictures.

=== Home media ===
Daddy's Home was released digitally on March 8, 2016, before being released on Blu-ray and DVD on March 22, 2016.

== Reception ==
=== Box office ===
Daddy's Home grossed $150.4 million in North America and $92.4 million in other territories for a worldwide total of $242.8 million, against a budget of $69 million. It is Ferrell's highest-grossing live-action film, surpassing Elf ($220.4 million).

In the United States and Canada, the film opened on December 25, 2015, alongside Point Break, Joy, Concussion, and the wide release of The Big Short. In its opening weekend the film was projected to gross $20–25 million from 3,271 theaters. However, after grossing $1.2 million from its early Thursday showings and $15.7m on its opening day, weekend projections were increased to $43–46 million. The film ended up grossing $38.7 million in its opening weekend, finishing second at the box office behind Star Wars: The Force Awakens ($149.2 million). It was the second biggest non-animated opening of Ferrell's career, behind Talladega Nights: The Ballad of Ricky Bobby ($47 million).

=== Critical response ===
On review aggregation website Rotten Tomatoes, Daddy's Home has an approval rating of 30% based on 123 reviews and an average rating of 4.9/10. The site's critical consensus reads, "Will Ferrell and Mark Wahlberg have proven comedic chemistry, but Daddy's Home suffers from a dearth of genuinely funny ideas – and lacks enough guts or imagination to explore the satirical possibilities of its premise." On Metacritic, the film has a score of 42 out of 100, based on 30 critics, indicating "mixed or average" reviews. Audiences polled by CinemaScore gave the film an average grade of "B+" on an A+ to F scale. American filmmaker Sofia Coppola is a huge fan of the film and later named it as one of her favorite films.

=== Accolades ===
Ferrell was nominated for a Teen Choice Award in the category Choice Movie Actor in a Comedy. Daddy's Home was nominated a Kid's Choice Award in the category Favorite Movie while Will Ferrell won the award in the category Favorite Movie Actor.

== Sequel ==
In April 2016, a sequel was announced with Ferrell and Wahlberg reprising their characters. Anders and John Morris wrote the script and Anders directed. In January 2017, Paramount Pictures courted Mel Gibson and John Lithgow to star in the sequel. The two were later confirmed to star in the film. Linda Cardellini, Owen Vaccaro and Scarlett Estevez also reprise their roles. John Cena reprised his role as Roger. It was released on November 10, 2017.

In an interview, Wahlberg mentioned that they would like to get Liam Neeson for the third installment of the film.
