= She's Out of My League =

2010 romantic comedy film

- Theatrical release poster
- Directed by: Jim Field Smith
- Written by: Sean Anders; John Morris
- Produced by: Jimmy Miller; David Householter
- Starring: Jay Baruchel; Alice Eve; T.J. Miller; Mike Vogel; Nate Torrence; Krysten Ritter; Geoff Stults; Lindsay Sloane
- Cinematography: Jim Denault
- Edited by: Dan Schalk
- Music by: Michael Andrews
- Production companies: DreamWorks Pictures; Mosaic Media Group
- Distributed by: Paramount Pictures
- Release date: March 12, 2010
- Running time: 104 minutes
- Country: United States
- Language: English
- Budget: $20 million
- Box office: $49.8 million

She's Out of My League is a 2010 American romantic comedy fantasy film starring Jay Baruchel as an average-looking man who begins a relationship with a very attractive woman, played by Alice Eve, and is warned by his friends that it is doomed to fall apart because of their differing appearances. The film was written by Sean Anders and John Morris, and directed by Jim Field Smith in his feature directorial debut. The supporting cast includes T.J. Miller, Mike Vogel, Nate Torrence, Krysten Ritter, Geoff Stults, and Lindsay Sloane.

She's Out of My League was filmed in Pittsburgh, Pennsylvania, with production finishing in 2008. It released on March 12, 2010, by Paramount Pictures. The film grossed $49.8 million on a $20 million budget, but received mixed reviews from critics.

== Plot ==
Kirk Kettner is a TSA agent at Pittsburgh International Airport. His ex-girlfriend Marnie has retained a relationship with his dysfunctional family, being at his parents' home with her current boyfriend, Ron. He attempts to reconcile with her despite Ron being present, as two years ago they 'took a break'.

Back at work, the attractive and successful Molly McCleish arrives at the terminal to board a flight. Kirk is the only TSA agent who behaves professionally towards her, then saves her from his boss' harassment. After boarding, she realizes she left her cell phone at security, then when her friend Patty calls it, Kirk answers. Molly and Kirk arrange to meet the following day at the Andy Warhol Museum, so he can give her the phone.

The next evening, Kirk and his friend Devon arrive at the museum. Molly invites them to stay at the party. Molly's clumsy sister Katie bumps into Kirk, causing him to spill his drink on the museum director. Kirk takes responsibility for the mishap, yet they get kicked out. As Kirk and Devon leave the building, Molly follows them outside. Grateful that Kirk took the hit so her sister was not fired, she offers him tickets to a Pittsburgh Penguins hockey game. He brings his friend Stainer to the game, where they see Molly and meet her friend Patty, then all sit together. While Stainer and Molly are away from their seats, Patty tells Kirk that Molly is interested in him.

Molly asks Kirk out a few days later and he agrees. Stainer predicts that their relationship will fail; as he considers her a "10" and he a "5," and the numerical "chasm" between them too big. Meanwhile, Patty thinks Molly has chosen Kirk only because he is "safe" and will not hurt her. On their date, Kirk tells Molly that he dreams of being a pilot. She tells him she almost became a lawyer before realizing her love for event planning. At the end of the night, they kiss in Kirk's car.

Molly accompanies Kirk to a family lunch, where she charms the men and makes Marnie jealous. After returning to Molly's apartment, while making out, Kirk ejaculates prematurely in his pants moments before Molly's parents unexpectedly arrive. Desperate to conceal the stain on his pants, Kirk will not stand to shake hands with Molly's father, and leaves quickly. Believing he fled to avoid interacting with her parents, Molly ignores Kirk's calls. He tracks her down, embarrassingly explains why he had to go, and she forgives him.

In conversation with Molly, Kirk suggests that she host a party for her sister Katie's 21st birthday. At the party, he is troubled by Molly being intentionally vague about Kirk's line of work to her parents. Molly's ex-boyfriend Cam, a stunt pilot, then arrives and alludes to her having a physical defect. After the party, they return to Molly's apartment and partially undress. Kirk discovers Molly's "defect" is slightly webbed toes, which he considers so minor that he decides that she is indeed too perfect for him. Upset with Kirk over his insecurities, Molly tells him that Cam had also had her on a pedestal, then he cheated on her. Molly confesses that she asked Kirk out because she considered him safe, causing Kirk to break up with her. He resumes his relationship with Marnie and makes plans to attend a family vacation in Branson together.

Later, Stainer asks his ex-girlfriend why she left him, and she says his insecurities were a turn-off. Realizing he caused Kirk and Molly's break-up by telling him that Molly was too good for him, Stainer phones Patty and gets her to bring Molly to the airport. He tries to get Kirk off the plane he has boarded, but to no avail. Stainer has Jack stop the plane, forcing everyone to disembark. Kirk flees from Marnie, who chases after him, and he breaks up with her in the process. Kirk meets Molly at the terminal gate, where she confesses Kirk's insecurities about himself are justified, but that she wants to be with him regardless. They reconcile and resume their relationship. Later, Kirk surprises Molly with a mystery trip to Cleveland via small aircraft, revealing that he has fulfilled his dream of becoming a pilot.

== Cast ==
- Jay Baruchel as Kirk Kettner, a nerdy and skinny TSA agent.
- Alice Eve as Molly McCleish, a beautiful and successful party planner, who falls in love with Kirk.
- T. J. Miller as Wendell "Stainer", Kirk's friend, who ranks everyone 0-10 and refers to Kirk as a "5" and Molly as a "10".
- Nate Torrence as Devon, Kirk's sensitive friend, who married the only girl he kissed.
- Mike Vogel as Jack, Kirk's athletic and handsome friend who provides helpful advice to Kirk.
- Lindsay Sloane as Marnie, Kirk's promiscuous ex-girlfriend, who always despised him until he started dating Molly.
- Krysten Ritter as Patty, Molly's sarcastic best friend.
- Geoff Stults as Cam, Molly's ex-boyfriend and stunt pilot.
- Kyle Bornheimer as Dylan Kettner, Kirk's older brother who has always bullied him.
- Jessica St. Clair as Debbie, Dylan's fiancé, who also bullies Kirk.
- Debra Jo Rupp as Mrs. Kettner, Dylan and Kirk's mother.
- Adam LeFevre as Mr. Kettner, Dylan and Kirk's father.
- Kim Shaw as Katie McCleish, Molly's sister.
- Sharon Maughan as Mrs. McCleish, Molly and Katie's mother.
- Trevor Eve as Mr. McCleish, Molly and Katie's father.
- Jasika Nicole as Wendy
- Hayes MacArthur as Ron, Dylan's best friend.
- Andy Daly as Mr. Fuller
- Robin Shorr as Tina Jordan, Stainer's love interest.
- Yan Xi as Karen, Devon's wife.

== Production ==
Principal photography commenced on March 31, 2008 at the Mellon Arena, then the home of the Pittsburgh Penguins hockey team. Filming continued in various locations around Pittsburgh until the end of May 2008, including Pittsburgh International Airport, the Andy Warhol Museum, Mount Washington, the downtown Regional Enterprise Tower, PNC Park, Market Square, and Century III Mall. Area sound stages were also used. Pluma's Restaurant in Irwin, Pennsylvania was used for bar scenes when shooting at Mellon Arena became impossible due to the Penguins' advancement to the 2008 Stanley Cup Finals. The film was co-produced by Jimmy Miller of Mosaic Media Group, a native of Castle Shannon, Pennsylvania and the brother of comedian Dennis Miller.

Molly's parents, Mr. and Mrs. McCleish, are played by Alice Eve's real-life parents, Sharon Maughan and Trevor Eve.

== Reception ==
=== Box office ===
She's Out of My League grossed $32 million in North America and $17.8 million in other territories for a total gross of $49.8 million, against a budget of $20 million.

It opened at #3 at the box office, behind Alice in Wonderland and Green Zone, with an estimated $9.6 million gross.

=== Critical response ===
On Rotten Tomatoes, She's Out of My League has an approval rating of 57% based on 133 reviews, with an average rating of 5.6/10. The site's critical consensus reads: "She's Out of My League has moments of humor and insight, but it's bogged down by excessive vulgarity and cartoonishness." On Metacritic the film has a score of 46 out of 100, based on 29 critics, indicating "mixed or average reviews". Audiences polled by CinemaScore gave the film an average grade of "B" on a scale of A+ to F.

Critic Roger Ebert of the Chicago Sun-Times gave the film three stars out of four saying: "The movie is not a comedy classic. But in a genre where so many movies struggle to lift themselves from zero to one, it's about, oh, a six point five." Peter Travers of Rolling Stone gave the film three stars out of four, commenting: "This R-rated blend of the sweet and the raunchy has its heart in the right place." Jake Tomlinson of Shave Magazine gave the movie four and a half stars out of five and praised the movie "for not throwing in cheap obstacles" and for the "good soundtrack." Michael O'Sullivan of The Washington Post was less enthused, giving the film one star out of four: "The movie clearly aspires to rise to the smutty-but-sweet synergy of other, better films. But She's Out of My League can't touch them."

== Home media ==
She's Out of My League was released on DVD and Blu-ray on June 22, 2010. As of October 2015, it has grossed $12.5 million in home video sales.
