= Hot Tub Time Machine =

2010 film by Steve Pink

- Theatrical release poster
- Directed by: Steve Pink
- Screenplay by: Josh Heald; Sean Anders; John Morris
- Story by: Josh Heald
- Produced by: John Cusack; Grace Loh; John Morris; Matt Moore
- Starring: John Cusack; Rob Corddry; Craig Robinson; Clark Duke; Crispin Glover; Lizzy Caplan; Chevy Chase
- Cinematography: Jack N. Green
- Edited by: George Folsey, Jr.; James Thomas
- Music by: Christophe Beck
- Production companies: Metro-Goldwyn-Mayer; United Artists; New Crime Productions
- Distributed by: MGM Distribution Co. (North America and select international territories); Lakeshore International (International)
- Release date: March 26, 2010 (United States)
- Running time: 99 minutes
- Country: United States
- Language: English
- Budget: $36 million
- Box office: $64.6 million

Hot Tub Time Machine is a 2010 American science fiction comedy film directed by Steve Pink and written by Josh Heald, Sean Anders, and John Morris. John Cusack, Rob Corddry, Craig Robinson, and Clark Duke star in the film as four men who accidentally time travel back to 1986 using a hot tub and must find a way to return to 2010. The supporting cast includes Sebastian Stan, Crispin Glover, Lizzy Caplan, and Chevy Chase.

The film was released on March 26, 2010 by MGM Distribution Co. in the United States, with Lakeshore International releasing in other territories. It received positive reviews and grossing $64.6 million against a claimed budget of $36 million. A sequel, Hot Tub Time Machine 2, was released on February 20, 2015.

== Plot ==
Three estranged middle-aged friends—Adam Yates, a workaholic who was dumped by his girlfriend; Nick Webber-Agnew, a neglected husband who works a dead-end job; and Lou Dorchen, an alcoholic slacker—reconnect in 2010 when Lou is hospitalized with carbon monoxide poisoning. Although Lou denies that he attempted suicide, Adam and Nick attempt to cheer him up by arranging for him to join them and Adam's socially inept nephew Jacob at Kodiak Valley Ski Resort, where the three enjoyed themselves as youths. When they arrive, they find that the town is not what it used to be, with many of the stores boarded up and the hotel run down.

While drinking in their hotel room's hot tub, the four accidentally douse the console with a Russian energy drink. After waking up and going skiing, the four find many societal differences from the past and realize they have accidentally traveled back to 1986. Adam, Lou, and Nick have also assumed their younger bodies, though Jacob's appearance is unchanged since he was not born yet, and he occasionally flickers in and out of reality. A cryptic repairman appears and warns them not to change anything as it might affect history. To minimize the butterfly effect, the group plans to re-enact their previous experiences: Adam has to break up with his girlfriend Jenny and get stabbed in the eye with a fork, Lou must pick a fight with and get beaten up by ski patrol bully Blaine, and Nick must have sex with a groupie and perform with his band at an open mic. They also find Kelly, Adam's sister and Jacob's mother, at the resort.

The three find their tasks difficult. Lou gets punched by Blaine and loses his backpack, but realizes he must face him again later at night, so he reluctantly challenges him again. Adam becomes attracted to Jenny again and loses the will to break up with her, but is distracted when he meets free-spirited music journalist April during a concert. Nick is concerned about cheating on his wife, even though he is yet to meet and marry her at this time. Jenny turns the tables on Adam when she initiates their breakup, but he still gets stabbed in the eye with a fork after he tries to prevent it. Severely heartbroken, he wanders around the resort alone before encountering April. They break into a house and have sex.

Meanwhile, Nick covers more upbeat music during his performance. When the repairman tells Jacob a certain chemical is the key to their time travel, Jacob realizes it was the energy drink they spilled. After the group prevents Lou from falling off a rooftop, they go to Blaine's cabin to search for the drink. Lou seduces Kelly but, when Jacob interrupts them, he suddenly vanishes. They realize that Lou is Jacob's father, and he reappears after Lou and Kelly finish conceiving him. Lou leaves Kelly to find Blaine, who he finally beats, and the four retrieve the energy drink and return to the hot tub.

Jacob and Nick enter the tub first, but Lou decides to stay in 1986, admitting to Adam that his carbon monoxide poisoning was indeed a suicide attempt. Knowing the future, he intends to make investments to become rich and have a closer relationship with Jacob. Adam wants to stay too, but Lou throws him into the vortex at the last moment.

Upon returning to 2010, Adam, Nick, and Jacob find that Lou has changed history by creating the immensely successful company Lougle, which affords him a luxurious life with Kelly. Adam discovers that he is happily married to April, while Nick is a successful music producer married to a loving and supportive wife. They reunite at Lou's mansion with their families, satisfied with their new lives.

== Cast ==
- John Cusack as Adam Yates
  - Jake Rose as 1986 Adam
- Rob Corddry as Lou Dorchen
  - Brook Bennett as 1986 Lou
- Craig Robinson as Nick Webber-Agnew
  - Aliu Oyofo as 1986 Nick
- Clark Duke as Jacob Yates
- Chevy Chase as Repairman
- Collette Wolfe as Kelly Yates
- Crispin Glover as Phil Wedmaier
- Sebastian Stan as Blaine
- Lizzy Caplan as April Drennan
- Crystal Lowe as Zoe
- Kellee Stewart as Courtney Agnew
  - Odessa Rojen as 9-year-old Courtney
- Lyndsy Fonseca as Jenny
- Charlie McDermott as Chaz
- Jessica Paré as Tara
- William Zabka as Rick Steelman
- Diora Baird as Rick Steelman's wife

== Production ==
Steve Pink directed the film from a screenplay by Josh Heald, Sean Anders, and John Morris; Heald wrote the original story alone. It was filmed primarily at the Vancouver Film Studios in Vancouver and the Fernie Alpine Resort in Fernie, British Columbia. Kelvin Humenny served as the art director for the film.

The first trailer and red band trailer appeared online and at Comic-Con on July 24, 2009. A second red band trailer was released on January 26, 2010. The film was screened for free in multiple North American cities in the weeks leading up to its release.

On March 29, 2010, Corddry and Duke served as the guest hosts of WWE Raw to promote the film. Robinson also made an appearance via satellite.

== Release ==
The film opened at number three with a weekend gross of $14 million in 2,754 theaters, averaging $5,091 per theater. Hot Tub Time Machine grossed $50.3 million in North America and $14.3 million in other territories for a worldwide total of $64.6 million against a claimed production budget of $36 million. Unofficial sources claimed the total budget including marketing was in the $95–97 million range and that the film was a financial failure in theaters. It was the last film released and self-distributed theatrically by MGM due to the studio's financial difficulties, until the 2018 remake of Death Wish.

Hot Tub Time Machine was released on DVD and Blu-ray on June 29, 2010. An unrated version was also released, with the Blu-ray Disc containing a digital copy. Total US DVD and Blu-ray sales were estimated at $34.5 million.

== Reception ==
On the review aggregator website Rotten Tomatoes, 64% of 210 critics' reviews are positive, with an average rating of 6.1/10. The website's consensus reads: "Its flagrantly silly script -- and immensely likable cast -- make up for most of its flaws." Metacritic, which uses a weighted average, assigned the film a score of 63 out of 100, based on 36 critics, indicating "generally favorable" reviews. Audiences polled by CinemaScore gave the film an average grade of "B" on an A+ to F scale.

The New York Times critic A. O. Scott stated:

The picture moves so quickly and crazily, swerving and skidding and doubling back for seconds, that minor lapses in wit are immediately overtaken by major (and therefore hilarious) lapses in taste... the undercurrent of misogyny and homophobic panic that courses through most arrested-development, guy-centric comedies these days is certainly present here. But unlike, say, The Hangover, which sweetens and sentimentalizes its man-child characters—allowing them to run wild and then run home to Mommy—Hot Tub Time Machine is honest in its coarseness and pretty tough on the fellows who are the agents and objects of its satire.

Roger Ebert gave the film three stars out of four:

The bottom line is, gross-out guy comedies open twice a month, and many of them are wretched excesses. Hot Tub Time Machine, which wants nothing more than to be a screwball farce, succeeds beyond any expectations suggested by the title.

== Soundtrack ==
Hot Tub Time Machine (Music From the Motion Picture)

Soundtrack album by Various Artists
- Released: March 23, 2010 (US)
- Label: Rhino Entertainment

The soundtrack for the film, officially titled Hot Tub Time Machine (Music From the Motion Picture), was released in 2010 by Rhino Entertainment. Several of the songs were sung by members of the film.

Some tracks have artists in parentheses; this is the artist who originally performed the song.

1. "Louder Than a Bomb" – Public Enemy
2. "Perfect Way" – Scritti Politti
3. "The Safety Dance" (extended 12" EP remastered version) – Men Without Hats
4. "What You Need" (Single/LP version) – INXS
5. "Modern Love" (Single version; 2002 digital remaster) – David Bowie
6. "I Will Dare" – The Replacements
7. "Push It" (album version) – Salt-n-Pepa
8. "Bring On the Dancing Horses" – Echo & the Bunnymen
9. "Save It for Later" – The Beat (known as The English Beat in the USA)
10. "True" – Spandau Ballet
11. "Jessie's Girl" (Rick Springfield) – Craig Robinson
12. "Bizarre Love Triangle" (Shep Pettibone 12" Remastered Remix) – New Order
13. "Once in a Lifetime" (2006 Remastered version) – Talking Heads
14. "Home Sweet Home" – Mötley Crüe (also performed by Rob Corddry during the closing credits)
15. "Let's Get It Started" (The Black Eyed Peas) – Craig Robinson
16. "Hero" – Enrique Iglesias

Not included in the album

The following songs were featured in the film, but not included in the soundtrack album:

- "(I Just) Died in Your Arms" – Cutting Crew
- "Dancing On A Volcano" – Tamplin
- "Bar Bet" – Jake Monaco
- "Blind Man" – Newton Talks
- "Careless Whisper" (George Michael) – Craig Robinson
- "Cry Tough" – Poison
- "Cubicle" -The Ultra-Infidels
- "Heaven's Sake" – Perfect
- "I Can't Wait" – Nu Shooz
- "I Heard a Rumor" – Ghost Swami
- "I Want to Know What Love Is" – Foreigner
- "Keep Your Eye on the Money" – Mötley Crüe
- "Kickstart My Heart" – Mötley Crüe
- "My Block" – Cham Pain
- "Mystery" – The Little Wands
- "Obsession" – Animotion
- "Occam's Razor" – Ocha la Rocha
- "Patrolio" – Jake Monaco
- "Skin I'm In" – Static Revenger featuring Luciana
- "Smooth Up in Ya" – BulletBoys
- "Talk Dirty to Me" – Poison
- "The Stripper" – David Rose
- "Turn Up the Radio" – Autograph
- "Venus" – The Jerry Ross Symphosium
- "Yes Man" – The Little Wands

== Sequel ==
Although not a huge commercial success, strong home video sales prompted a sequel to Hot Tub Time Machine. Corddry, Robinson, Duke, Chase, Wolfe, and Stewart all reprised their roles, while Adam Scott was an addition to the cast in the role of Adam Yates Jr., the son of Cusack's character. Cusack appears in an uncredited cameo in the unrated home video release of the film.

Released on February 20, 2015, the sequel was panned by critics and was a box-office failure, grossing less money in its entire domestic theatrical release ($12.3 million) than the original made in its opening weekend ($14 million).
