= Daddy's Home 2 =

2017 American comedy film

- Theatrical release poster
- Directed by: Sean Anders
- Screenplay by: Sean Anders; John Morris
- Based on: Characters by Brian Burns
- Produced by: Will Ferrell; Adam McKay; Chris Henchy; John Morris
- Starring: Will Ferrell; Mark Wahlberg; Linda Cardellini; John Cena; John Lithgow; Mel Gibson
- Cinematography: Julio Macat
- Edited by: Brad Wilhite
- Music by: Michael Andrews
- Production company: Gary Sanchez Productions
- Distributed by: Paramount Pictures
- Release dates: November 5, 2017 (Regency Village Theater); November 10, 2017 (United States)
- Running time: 100 minutes
- Country: United States
- Language: English
- Budget: $69 million
- Box office: $180.6 million

Daddy's Home 2 (titled on screen as Daddy's Home Two) is a 2017 American Christmas buddy comedy film directed by Sean Anders and written by Anders and John Morris. A sequel to Daddy's Home (2015), it stars Will Ferrell, Mark Wahlberg, Linda Cardellini, John Cena, with John Lithgow and Mel Gibson. The plot follows now-reformed fathers Brad and Dusty (Ferrell and Wahlberg), now co-parenting Dusty's kids, who have to deal with their own fathers (Lithgow and Gibson) visiting for the holidays.

Unlike its predecessor, Red Granite Pictures was not involved in the film's production. Principal photography on the film began in Massachusetts in March 2017 and it was released in the United States by Paramount Pictures on November 10, 2017. Although the film received generally negative reviews from critics, it grossed over $180 million worldwide against a production budget of $69–70 million.

== Plot ==
As Brad Whitaker and Dusty Mayron continue co-parenting Dylan and Megan, the men decide to have a joint Christmas rather than separate ones, after Megan embarrassingly publicly admits she would prefer one "together Christmas". However, Dusty's tough fighter pilot/Space Shuttle astronaut father Kurt and Brad's overbearing and cheerful father Don unexpectedly arrive for Christmas.

Megan and Dylan warmly embrace Don, as he is very present in their lives, while Kurt hasn't seen them since they were toddlers. Envious of the affection the children show Don, Kurt rents a large cabin to house them all through the holiday week.

Brad and Dusty's co-parenting is put to the test by Kurt's meddling. Dusty's resentment of Kurt mainly stems from his frequent absences as a child. Especially painful was when, during a youth Glee Club recital, he embarrassed himself by missing his solo part when Kurt left to make out with a woman during it. Meanwhile, Sara tries to bond with Karen, but is appalled by her behavior. She later becomes concerned with Don's wife's absence, who he claims couldn't come as she is taking care of her ill brother.

Dylan develops a crush on Casey, a little girl staying in the cabin nearby, causing Megan and Adrianna to constantly tease him in front of her. Brad gives him some "advice", and Dusty interjects when he thinks Brad is having what looks like "the talk" with Dylan, although they had agreed to do it together. As the trees on the Christmas tree farm are small, Kurt suggests they illegally cut one down. Brad mistakes a cell phone tower for a tree and is electrocuted.

Brad, Dusty, Don and Kurt go to an improv comedy club, where they are enjoying themselves until Kurt picks up a woman at the bar, annoying Dusty. Brad enters Don into the improv show, and Dusty chooses the topic of a husband confronting his cheating wife as the subject of the skit. As it progresses, it is revealed that Don and his wife are divorced, shocking Brad.

Sara comforts Don about his divorce, but when Dusty reveals his part in the skit, Don and Brad become furious and Dusty and Brad's relationship becomes strained. Brad, attempting to get back at Dusty, invites Adrianna's father Roger, who intimidates Dusty.

The entire family takes part in a live nativity. Brad fights with Dusty, wanting to play Joseph. A drunken Megan begins to swear, and an equally drunk Adrianna falls from her platform, then the crowd breaks up. Instead of Dusty fighting Brad, he almost fights Roger, and Don is repeatedly hit in the face with ice-balls.

On Christmas Day, the families, depressed from all the arguing, pack up to leave. On their way out of town, they are forced to take shelter in a cinema, due to a blizzard. They see Missile Tow, a holiday action comedy film starring Liam Neeson. When the power cuts off during the movie, everyone goes to the lobby where each man confronts his father about his secrets, lies, and attitudes, then reconcile.

Remembering Kurt's advice, Dylan walks toward the girl he has a crush on to kiss her, but instead kisses Adrianna, although the other girl does kiss him later on when Megan and Adrianna put him under the mistletoe, along with other girls (and a boy) who line up to kiss him. Kurt pushes Dusty to stand up to Adrianna and punish her for her recent behavior, but he instead tells her he loves her. He then tells Roger he also loves him, as he is also part of the family. Roger almost leaves without Adrianna, but has a change of heart after everyone breaks out singing "Do They Know It's Christmas?" (during which the power comes back on) and he decides to stay.

At the airport, Don and Kurt are preparing to head back to their respective homes where Kurt reveals to Don that he switched out the tickets and they are going to spend New Year's together in Las Vegas. As Brad's mother arrives, Dusty and Brad discover Brad's new stepfather is Chesley "Sully" Sullenberger, pilot of the 2009 "Miracle on the Hudson" flight, and Dusty appears to be excited to meet him. However, Brad furiously runs down the terminal, screaming that Sully will never replace his father.

In a post-credits scene, Don is at the site of the nativity, droning on and on to the workers who are taking down the decorations, telling long-winded stories about the nativity scenes in his own hometown. The others eventually leave while Don continues to talk.

== Cast ==
- Will Ferrell as Brad Whitaker, Sara's husband, Dylan and Megan's stepfather
- Mark Wahlberg as Dusty Mayron, Kurt's son, Karen's husband, Adrianna's stepfather
  - Daniel DiMaggio as Young Dusty
- John Lithgow as Don Whitaker, Brad's father, Sara's father-in law
- Mel Gibson as Kurt Mayron, Dusty's father
- Linda Cardellini as Sara Whitaker, Brad's wife, Dylan and Megan's mother
- John Cena as Roger, Adrianna's father, Karen's ex-husband
- Scarlett Estevez as Megan Mayron Whitaker, Dusty and Sara's daughter
- Owen Vaccaro as Dylan Mayron Whitaker, Dusty and Sara's son
- Alessandra Ambrosio as Karen Mayron, Dusty's wife
- Didi Costine as Adrianna, Roger and Karen's daughter, Dusty's step-daughter
- Bill Burr as Jerry
- Liam Neeson as himself (voice)
- Priscilla Manning as Ginny Whitaker, Brad's mother
- Sully Sullenberger as Chesley "Sully" Sullenberger, Brad's stepfather
- Yamilah Saravong as Casey, Dylan's girlfriend

== Production ==
In April 2016, the sequel was announced, with Will Ferrell and Mark Wahlberg reprising their roles, Sean Anders and John Morris writing the script, and Anders directing. In January 2017, it was reported that Mel Gibson and John Lithgow were being sought to play the main characters' fathers in the film. The two were later confirmed to star, along with Linda Cardellini, John Cena, Owen Vaccaro and Scarlett Estevez, reprising their roles.

Principal photography began on March 20, 2017. Scenes were filmed in Concord, Massachusetts, Clinton, Massachusetts, Framingham, Massachusetts, Lawrence, Massachusetts and Great Barrington, Massachusetts.

== Release ==
The film was released in the United States on November 10, 2017.

Daddy's Home 2 was released on Digital HD on February 6, 2018, and was released on Blu-ray and DVD on February 20, 2018.

== Reception ==
=== Box office ===
Daddy's Home 2 grossed $104 million in the United States and Canada, and $76.6 million in other territories, for a worldwide total of $180.6 million, against a production budget of $69–70 million.

In the United States and Canada, Daddy's Home 2 opened alongside Murder on the Orient Express, and was projected to gross around $20 million from 3,575 theaters in its opening weekend. The film made $10.7 million on its first day, including $1.5 million from Thursday night previews at 2,500 theaters, up from the $1.2 million made by the first film. It went on to debut to $29.7 million, finishing second at the box office, behind holdover Thor: Ragnarok ($57 million). In its second weekend, the film made $14.4 million (a drop of 51.3%), finishing 4th behind Justice League, Wonder and Thor: Ragnarok.

=== Critical response ===
On Rotten Tomatoes, Daddy's Home 2 holds an approval rating of 21% based on 129 reviews, and an average rating of 4.1/10. The website's critical consensus reads, "A formulaic comedy that's unlikely to spread much yuletide merriment, Daddy's Home 2 can only muster a few stray yuks from its talented cast." On Metacritic, the film has a weighted average score of 30 out of 100 based on 26 critics, indicating "generally unfavorable" reviews. Audiences polled by CinemaScore gave the film an average grade of "A−" on an A+ to F scale.

Alonso Duralde of TheWrap was critical of what he described as the film's sloppiness and laziness, saying, "Director Sean Anders and his co-writer John Morris execute what are supposed to be the laughs with blunt force. The jokes announce themselves with heavy footsteps, and almost none of them land, stranding a talented cast with terrible material that they're straining to sell." Richard Roeper of the Chicago Sun-Times gave the film 1 out of 4 stars, saying: "After enduring last week's lousy and lazy A Bad Moms Christmas, I would have bet it would be many a year before we'd see another holiday comedy more sour and cynical and profoundly unfunny. I sit corrected."

Glenn Kenny of RogerEbert.com gave the film 2.5 out of 4 stars, writing, "I found the sequel better than the original—the writing sharper, the jokes fresher and smarter, the comic interaction between the lead characters consistently engaging. I mentioned this to my incredulous wife, who said, 'So you're saying it's the Godfather, Part 2 of the Daddy's Home series'."

=== Accolades ===
| Year | Award | Category | Subject | Result | Notes |
|---|---|---|---|---|---|
| March 3, 2018 | Golden Raspberry Awards | Worst Actor | Mark Wahlberg | Nominated | |
| March 3, 2018 | Golden Raspberry Awards | Worst Supporting Actor | Mel Gibson | Won | |
| August 12, 2018 | Teen Choice Awards | Choice Comedy | Daddy's Home 2 | Nominated | |
| August 12, 2018 | Teen Choice Awards | Choice Comedy Actor | Will Ferrell | Nominated | |
| August 12, 2018 | Teen Choice Awards | Choice Comedy Actor | Mark Wahlberg | Nominated | |

== Possible sequel ==
In an interview, Mark Wahlberg mentioned that he would like to get Liam Neeson for the third installment of the film.

== See also ==
- List of Christmas films
