= Instant Family =

2018 film by Sean Anders

- Theatrical release poster
- Directed by: Sean Anders
- Written by: Sean Anders; John Morris
- Produced by: Sean Anders; Stephen Levinson; John Morris; Mark Wahlberg; Eric Kissack
- Starring: Mark Wahlberg; Rose Byrne; Isabela Merced; Margo Martindale; Julie Hagerty; Octavia Spencer
- Cinematography: Brett Pawlak
- Edited by: Brad Wilhite
- Music by: Michael Andrews
- Production companies: Leverage Entertainment; Closest to The Hole Productions; Two Grown Men Productions
- Distributed by: Paramount Pictures
- Release date: November 16, 2018
- Running time: 118 minutes
- Country: United States
- Language: English
- Budget: $48 million
- Box office: $121 million

Instant Family is a 2018 American family comedy-drama film starring Mark Wahlberg and Rose Byrne as parents who adopt three siblings, played by Isabela Merced, Gustavo Quiroz, and Julianna Gamiz. It also stars Margo Martindale, Julie Hagerty, Tig Notaro, and Octavia Spencer. The film is directed by Sean Anders, who wrote the screenplay with John Morris, based in part on Anders' own experiences.

Instant Family was released in the United States on November 16, 2018. It grossed $121 million worldwide, and was called an "earnest, heartwarming comedy" by critics, who also praised the performances.

== Plot ==
Couple Pete and Ellie Wagner, pressured by family to have children, consider adoption. They join a foster care course, led by social workers Karen and Sharon. At a fair to meet children, Ellie is voicing her reluctance towards fostering teens when they are confronted by 15-year-old Lizzie, who impresses them.

The Wagners discover that Lizzie has siblings, 11-year-old Juan and 6-year-old Lita, who must be kept together. Their mother Carla is an incarcerated drug addict. In their first meeting with the trio, they do not immediately connect, so they reconsider. At Thanksgiving dinner with Ellie's family, the couple announce they are not going to adopt. Everyone admits no one believed they would, so Pete and Ellie decide to officially adopt the children.

Lizzie, Juan, and Lita move in with the Wagners, whose lives become hectic – Lita throws tantrums, Juan is extremely emotional and fragile, and Lizzie resents Ellie's attempts to parent them. The Wagners turn to their foster parent support group. Pete's mother Sandy wins the kids over by taking everyone to Six Flags, but Lizzie disappears with friends and returns late, so Pete grounds her.

The next day, while Pete and Ellie confront Lizzie trying to leave with friends, Juan accidentally shoots his foot with a nail gun. Seeing Pete and Ellie rush a hysterical Juan to the hospital and comfort both him and Lita, Lizzie begins to warm up to them, taking the blame in front of social worker Karen.

After Lizzie and Ellie argue, sparked by Lizzie's suppressed emotions, Pete invites her to vent by helping demolish the kitchen of a renovation project. She later apologizes to Ellie, calling a truce.

Over the next two months, the Wagners' relationship with the children gradually improves. Lita calls Pete "Daddy" first. Then, one night Ellie comforts Juan when he has a nightmare. She is overjoyed when, afterwards he says, "Good night, Mommy”.

Recently released from prison, Carla reunites with them, meeting Pete and Ellie. The younger two do not want to go to her, with Lita even calling Ellie mom. Carla's visits disrupt the Wagner household; the children become more unruly, leaving the Wagners demotivated and frustrated. They express their feelings in the support group, but the social workers explain the ultimate goal is to keep families together, so the children could return to their birth mother.

Arriving home, Pete and Ellie are horrified to discover Lizzie exchanging nude pictures of herself with her boyfriend Jacob. Pete and Ellie seek out the Fernandezes, whose adoptive daughter Brenda had inspired them at their orientation. They learn she is back in rehab, but Mr. and Mrs. Fernandez assure the Wagners that "things that matter are hard".

When taking the children to school the next day, Pete and Ellie confront who Lizzie claimed was Jacob, only to discover that he's another student named Charlie, who reveals that Jacob is the school's 22 year old janitor. They confront and beat up Jacob, who is arrested, as are Pete and Ellie, resulting in Juan and Lita being left in the car unattended. Returning home after posting bail, Sandy tells them that they need to reassure Lizzie that they love her.

At the children's court hearing, the judge reads Lizzie's negative statement about Pete and Ellie's actions, which leaves out key details. He refuses to let Ellie read her own statement, so Carla wins custody. Juan and Lita do not want to leave the Wagners, but Lizzie is pleased.

The next day, however, Karen and Sharon arrive without Carla, who is not ready to take them back, admitting that Lizzie did the paperwork to reunite them. Karen and Sharon further reveal that Carla is using drugs again. Heartbroken and devastated, Lizzie tearfully runs away as Pete and Ellie follow. Ellie has Lizzie read their court statement, insisting she and Pete love her, and all three reconcile.

Four months later, the family prepares and attends another court hearing (during which Lizzie is seen calling Ellie and Pete "Mom" and "Papá"), where they finalize the adoption of the three. The family pose for a photo, joined by the judge, members of their extended family, and fellow foster families.

== Cast ==
- Mark Wahlberg as Peter "Pete" Wagner
- Rose Byrne as Elinore "Ellie" Wagner
- Isabela Merced (credited as Isabela Moner) as Elizabeth "Lizzie" Wagner, 15 years old and the oldest child
- Gustavo Escobar as Juan Wagner, 11 years old and the middle child
- Julianna Gamiz as Lita Isabella Wagner, 6 years old and the youngest child
- Octavia Spencer as Karen, one of the social workers who guides the parents-to-be through the foster care process
- Tig Notaro as Sharon, another one of the social workers who guide the parents-to-be through the foster care process
- Margo Martindale as Grandma Sandy Wagner, Pete's overbearing and goodhearted mother
- Julie Hagerty as Jan, Ellie's soft-spoken and naive mother
- Michael O'Keefe as Jerry, Ellie's father
- Tom Segura as Russ, Kim's husband
- Allyn Rachel as Kim, Ellie's sister
- Iliza Shlesinger as October
- Valente Rodriguez as Judge Rivas, the Adoption Court Judge
- Charlie McDermott as Stewart, Pete's co-worker
- Carson Holmes as Charlie, Lizzie's schoolmate
- Nicholas Logan as Jacob, janitor at Lizzie's school
- Joselin Reyes as Carla, the children's birthmother
- Eve Harlow as Brenda
- Andrea Anders as Jessie
- Gary Weeks as Dirk
- Joan Cusack as Mrs. Howard
- Hampton Fluker as Kit
- Keeper as Meatball (the dog)

== Production ==
The film was inspired by Anders's own experiences fostering and then adopting three siblings. The children were aged 6 years, 3 years, and 18 months. Anders talked to other adoptive families and teenagers who had grown up in care and then been adopted in order to research the character of Lizzie.

Rose Byrne joined the cast of the film on November 17, 2017. Isabela Merced co-stars alongside Mark Wahlberg for a second time, after previously working together on Transformers: The Last Knight in 2017. Octavia Spencer, Tig Notaro, Iliza Shlesinger, Gustavo Escobar (Gustavo Quiroz), Julianna Gamiz, and Tom Segura were added to the cast in February 2018, with filming beginning the following month, and lasting until May 14.

== Release ==
Instant Family was originally scheduled for release in the United States on February 15, 2019, before being moved up three months, to November 16, 2018. On November 10, 2018, it was announced the film's November 11 premiere in Los Angeles would be canceled due to the Woolsey Fire, but that a screening would take place at an evacuation center for victims of the fires. Instant Family became available on Digital on February 19, 2019, and on DVD/Blu-Ray on March 5, 2019.

== Reception ==
=== Box office ===
The film grossed $67.4 million in the United States and Canada, and $53.2 million in other territories, for a worldwide total of $120.6 million, against a production budget of $48 million.

In the United States and Canada, Instant Family was released alongside Fantastic Beasts: The Crimes of Grindelwald and Widows, and was projected to gross $15–20 million from 3,258 theaters in its opening weekend. It made $4.5 million on its first day, including $550,000 from Thursday night previews. It went on to debut to $14.5 million, finishing fourth at the box office. Deadline Hollywood said the opening, compared to the $48 million budget, "isn't spectacular, but there's hope that [the] film could leg out...over Thanksgiving." In its second weekend, the film dropped only 15% to $12.3 million (including $17.2 million over the five-day Thanksgiving frame), finishing sixth.

=== Critical response ===
On review aggregator Rotten Tomatoes, the film holds an approval rating of 82% based on 155 reviews and an average rating of 6.6/10. The website's critical consensus reads, "Instant Family may not quite capture the complexity of real-life adoption, but fittingly for the unconditional bond it honors, this flawed yet well-intentioned dramedy is ultimately worth the investment." On Metacritic, the film has a weighted average score of 57 out of 100, based on 28 critics, indicating "mixed or average" reviews. Audiences polled by CinemaScore gave the film an average grade of "A" on an A+ to F scale, while PostTrak reported filmgoers gave it an 83% overall positive score and a 61% "definite recommend".
