= List of 2 Broke Girls episodes =

2 Broke Girls is an American television sitcom created by Michael Patrick King and Whitney Cummings, who also serve as executive producers. The series stars Kat Dennings as Max Black, who comes from a poor underclass family, and Beth Behrs as Caroline Channing, who was born and raised rich but is now down on her luck, working together at a restaurant in the Brooklyn neighborhood of Williamsburg. Each episode ends with a running tally of the money earned towards the $250,000 the girls need to open a cupcake business, whether it increases or decreases.

The series aired on CBS from September 19, 2011, to April 17, 2017. During the course of the series, 138 episodes of 2 Broke Girls aired over six seasons. The series was canceled on May 12, 2017, after six seasons.

With the exception of "Pilot", all episodes start with the word "And", so the titles when combined with the series' name, read, "2 Broke Girls and the Break-up Scene", for example.

== Series overview ==
Season	Episodes	Originally released	
Season	Episodes	First released	Last released
1	24	September 19, 2011	May 7, 2012
2	24	September 24, 2012	May 13, 2013
3	24	September 23, 2013	May 5, 2014
4	22	October 27, 2014	May 18, 2015
5	22	November 12, 2015	May 12, 2016
6	22	October 10, 2016	April 17, 2017

== Episodes ==
=== Season 1 (2011–12) ===
No. overall	No. in season	Title	Directed by	Written by	Original release date	Prod. code	U.S. viewers (millions)
1	1	"Pilot"	James Burrows	Michael Patrick King and Whitney Cummings	September 19, 2011	296793	19.37
2	2	"And the Break-up Scene"	James Burrows	Michael Patrick King	September 26, 2011	2J6352	11.75
3	3	"And Strokes of Goodwill"	John Fortenberry	Jhoni Marchinko	October 3, 2011	2J6353	11.42
4	4	"And the Rich People Problems"	John Fortenberry	Michelle Nader	October 10, 2011	2J6354	10.71
5	5	"And the '90s Horse Party"	Scott Ellis	Sonny Lee and Patrick Walsh	October 17, 2011	2J6355	11.47
6	6	"And the Disappearing Bed"	Scott Ellis	Greg Malins	October 24, 2011	2J6356	11.19
7	7	"And the Pretty Problem"	Scott Ellis	David Feeney	October 31, 2011	2J6357	10.97
8	8	"And Hoarder Culture"	Ted Wass	Liz Feldman	November 7, 2011	2J6358	11.43
9	9	"And the Really Petty Cash"	Ted Wass	Morgan Murphy	November 14, 2011	2J6359	11.77
10	10	"And the Very Christmas Thanksgiving"	Jean Sagal	Michael Patrick King	November 21, 2011	2J6360	11.33
11	11	"And the Reality Check"	Fred Savage	Molly McAleer	December 5, 2011	2J6361	12.75
12	12	"And the Pop-Up Sale"	Fred Savage	Michelle Nader	December 12, 2011	2J6362	12.50
13	13	"And the Secret Ingredient"	Julie Anne Robinson	Michael Patrick King	January 2, 2012	2J6363	12.10
14	14	"And the Upstairs Neighbor"	Thomas Kail	Michael Patrick King	January 16, 2012	2J6364	11.40
15	15	"And the Blind Spot"	Ted Wass	Michelle Nader	February 6, 2012	2J6365	11.47
16	16	"And the Broken Hearts"	Ted Wass	David Feeney	February 13, 2012	2J6366	10.48
17	17	"And the Kosher Cupcakes"	Scott Ellis	Liz Feldman	February 20, 2012	2J6367	11.37
18	18	"And the One-Night Stands"	Scott Ellis	Sonny Lee and Patrick Walsh	February 27, 2012	2J6368	10.18
19	19	"And the Spring Break"	Scott Ellis	Morgan Murphy	March 19, 2012	2J6369	9.38
20	20	"And the Drug Money"	Ted Wass	Greg Malins	April 9, 2012	2J6370	8.78
21	21	"And the Messy Purse Smackdown"	Ted Wass	Molly McAleer	April 16, 2012	2J6371	8.52
22	22	"And the Big Buttercream Breakthrough"	Ted Wass	Michelle Nader	April 30, 2012	2J6372	9.24
23	23	"And Martha Stewart Have a Ball: Parts 1 & 2"	Ted Wass	Michael Patrick King	May 7, 2012	2J6373	8.99
24	24	"And Martha Stewart Have a Ball: Parts 1 & 2"	Ted Wass	Michael Patrick King	May 7, 2012	2J6374	8.99

=== Season 2 (2012–13) ===
No. overall	No. in season	Title	Directed by	Written by	Original release date	Prod. code	U.S. viewers (millions)
25	1	"And the Hidden Stash"	Fred Savage	Michelle Nader	September 24, 2012	2J6703	10.14
26	2	"And the Pearl Necklace"	Fred Savage	Michael Patrick King	October 1, 2012	2J6701	9.22
27	3	"And the Hold-Up"	Fred Savage	Jhoni Marchinko	October 8, 2012	2J6702	9.42
28	4	"And the Cupcake War"	Fred Savage	Molly McAleer	October 15, 2012	2J6704	9.30
29	5	"And the Pre-Approved Credit Card"	Fred Savage	Sonny Lee and Patrick Walsh	November 5, 2012	2J6706	9.01
30	6	"And the Candy Manwich"	Fred Savage	Liz Feldman	November 12, 2012	2J6705	8.94
31	7	"And the Three Boys with Wood"	Thomas Kail	Morgan Murphy	November 19, 2012	2J6707	9.74
32	8	"And the Egg Special"	Thomas Kail	Tracy Poust and Jon Kinnally	November 26, 2012	2J6708	11.74
33	9	"And the New Boss"	Don Scardino	Michelle Nader	December 3, 2012	2J6709	10.17
34	10	"And the Big Opening"	Lonny Price	Michael Patrick King	December 10, 2012	2J6710	11.04
35	11	"And the Silent Partner"	Don Scardino	Tracy Poust and Jon Kinnally	December 10, 2012	2J6711	10.78
36	12	"And the High Holidays"	Don Scardino	Molly McAleer	December 17, 2012	2J6712	10.22
37	13	"And the Bear Truth"	Scott Ellis	Liz Feldman	January 14, 2013	2J6714	12.45
38	14	"And Too Little Sleep"	Scott Ellis	Jhoni Marchinko and Michelle Nader	January 21, 2013	2J6713	11.56
39	15	"And the Psychic Shakedown"	Ken Whittingham	Michael Patrick King	February 4, 2013	2J6715	11.36
40	16	"And Just Plane Magic"	Ken Whittingham	Molly McAleer	February 11, 2013	2J6716	10.90
41	17	"And the Broken Hip"	Ken Whittingham	Charles Brottmiller	February 18, 2013	2J6717	10.25
42	18	"And Not-So-Sweet Charity"	Fred Savage	Morgan Murphy	February 25, 2013	2J6718	10.41
43	19	"And the Temporary Distraction"	Fred Savage	Sonny Lee and Patrick Walsh	March 18, 2013	2J6719	8.56
44	20	"And the Big Hole"	Fred Savage	Liz Feldman	March 25, 2013	2J6720	8.76
45	21	"And the Worst Selfie Ever"	Phill Lewis	Laura Kightlinger	April 15, 2013	2J6721	7.54
46	22	"And the Extra Work"	Michael McDonald	Jon Kinnally and Tracy Poust	April 29, 2013	2J6722	7.85
47	23	"And the Tip Slip"	Lonny Price	Michelle Nader	May 6, 2013	2J6723	7.97
48	24	"And the Window of Opportunity"	Phill Lewis	Michael Patrick King	May 13, 2013	2J6724	8.94

=== Season 3 (2013–14) ===
No. overall	No. in season	Title	Directed by	Written by	Original release date	Prod. code	U.S. viewers (millions)
49	1	"And the Soft Opening"	Don Scardino	Michael Patrick King	September 23, 2013	2J6801	8.88
50	2	"And the Kickstarter"	Don Scardino	Michelle Nader	September 30, 2013	2J6802	7.72
51	3	"And the Kitty Kitty Spank Spank"	Don Scardino	Jhoni Marchinko	October 7, 2013	2J6803	7.26
52	4	"And the Group Head"	Don Scardino	Liz Feldman	October 14, 2013	2J6804	7.99
53	5	"And the Cronuts"	Don Scardino	Sonny Lee & Patrick Walsh	October 21, 2013	2J6805	7.36
54	6	"And the Piece of Sheet"	Don Scardino	Liz Astrof	October 28, 2013	2J6806	7.71
55	7	"And the Girlfriend Experience"	Don Scardino	Morgan Murphy	November 4, 2013	2J6807	8.12
56	8	"And the 'It' Hole"	Don Scardino	Whitney Cummings	November 11, 2013	2J6808	8.23
57	9	"And the Pastry Porn"	Don Scardino	Charles Brottmiller	November 18, 2013	2J6809	7.92
58	10	"And the First Day of School"	Don Scardino	Michael Patrick King	November 25, 2013	2J6810	7.82
59	11	"And the Life After Death"	Don Scardino	Molly McAleer	December 2, 2013	2J6811	8.48
60	12	"And the French Kiss"	Don Scardino	Michelle Nader	December 16, 2013	2J6812	7.59
61	13	"And the Big But"	Don Scardino	Liz Feldman	January 13, 2014	2J6813	8.95
62	14	"And the Dumpster Sex"	Don Scardino	Liz Astrof	January 20, 2014	2J6814	9.03
63	15	"And the Icing on the Cake"	Phill Lewis	Sonny Lee & Patrick Walsh	January 27, 2014	2J6815	10.05
64	16	"And the ATM"	Phill Lewis	Charles Brottmiller	February 3, 2014	2J6816	9.22
65	17	"And the Married Man Sleepover"	Phill Lewis	Whitney Cummings	February 24, 2014	2J6817	7.96
66	18	"And the Near Death Experience"	Phill Lewis	Liz Feldman	March 3, 2014	2J6818	8.44
67	19	"And the Kilt Trip"	Phill Lewis	Molly McAleer & Morgan Murphy	March 17, 2014	2J6819	7.21
68	20	"And the Not Broke Parents"	Phill Lewis	Michael Patrick King	March 24, 2014	2J6820	7.40
69	21	"And the Wedding Cake Cake Cake"	Jean Sagal	Michelle Nader & Liz Astrof	April 14, 2014	2J6821	7.22
70	22	"And the New Lease on Life"	Phill Lewis	Sonny Lee & Patrick Walsh	April 21, 2014	2J6822	7.10
71	23	"And the Free Money"	Phill Lewis	Charles Brottmiller	April 28, 2014	2J6823	7.76
72	24	"And the First Degree"	Phill Lewis	Morgan Murphy	May 5, 2014	2J6824	6.49

=== Season 4 (2014–15) ===
No. overall	No. in season	Title	Directed by	Written by	Original release date	Prod. code	U.S. viewers (millions)
73	1	"And the Reality Problem"	Don Scardino	Michael Patrick King	October 27, 2014	2J6901	8.43
74	2	"And the DJ Face"	Don Scardino	Liz Astrof	November 3, 2014	2J6902	7.97
75	3	"And the Childhood Not Included"	Don Scardino	Michelle Nader	November 10, 2014	2J6903	7.55
76	4	"And the Old Bike Yarn"	Don Scardino	Patrick Walsh	November 17, 2014	2J6904	7.90
77	5	"And the Brand Job"	Don Scardino	Morgan Murphy	November 24, 2014	2J6905	6.85
78	6	"And the Model Apartment"	Don Scardino	Linda Videtti Figueiredo	December 8, 2014	2J6906	7.72
79	7	"And a Loan for Christmas"	Don Scardino	Charles Brottmiller	December 15, 2014	2J6907	7.81
80	8	"And the Fun Factory"	Don Scardino	Michael Rowe	January 5, 2015	2J6908	9.08
81	9	"And the Past and the Furious"	Don Scardino	Michelle Nader & Liz Astrof	January 19, 2015	2J6909	8.86
82	10	"And the Move-In Meltdown"	Don Scardino	Patrick Walsh	February 2, 2015	2J6910	9.31
83	11	"And the Crime Ring"	Don Scardino	Morgan Murphy	February 9, 2015	2J6911	9.13
84	12	"And the Knock Off Knock Out"	Don Scardino	Justin Sayre	February 16, 2015	2J6912	8.74
85	13	"And the Great Unwashed"	Don Scardino	Laura Kightlinger	February 23, 2015	2J6913	8.47
86	14	"And the Cupcake Captives"	Don Scardino	Charles Brottmiller	March 9, 2015	2J6914	8.25
87	15	"And the Fat Cat"	Fred Savage	Liz Astrof & Michelle Nader	March 23, 2015	2J6915	7.26
88	16	"And the Zero Tolerance"	Fred Savage	Michael Patrick King	March 30, 2015	2J6916	7.13
89	17	"And the High Hook-Up"	Fred Savage	Michelle Nader & Liz Astrof	April 13, 2015	2J6917	7.07
90	18	"And the Taste Test"	Jim Rose & Fred Savage	Charles Brottmiller & Justin Sayre	April 20, 2015	2J6918	7.53
91	19	"And the Look of the Irish"	Fred Savage	Patrick Walsh & Karen Kilgariff	April 27, 2015	2J6919	6.57
92	20	"And the Minor Problem"	Fred Savage	Liz Astrof	May 4, 2015	2J6920	6.43
93	21	"And the Grate Expectations"	Fred Savage	Michelle Nader	May 11, 2015	2J6921	6.96
94	22	"And the Disappointing Unit"	Michael Patrick King	Michael Patrick King	May 18, 2015	2J6922	7.56

=== Season 5 (2015–16) ===
No. overall	No. in season	Title	Directed by	Written by	Original release date	Prod. code	U.S. viewers (millions)
95	1	"And the Wrecking Ball"	Michael Patrick King	Michael Patrick King	November 12, 2015	3J5051	6.34
96	2	"And the Gym and Juice"	Michael Patrick King	Liz Astrof	November 19, 2015	3J5052	6.42
97	3	"And the Maybe Baby"	Jason Reilly	Michelle Nader	November 26, 2015	3J5053	5.93
98	4	"And the Inside Outside Situation"	David Trainer	Justin Sayre	December 10, 2015	3J5054	5.70
99	5	"And the Escape Room"	David Trainer	Patrick Walsh	December 17, 2015	3J5055	6.92
100	6	"And the Not Regular Down There"	Katy Garretson	Rachel Sweet	January 6, 2016	3J5057	6.29
101	7	"And the Coming Out Party"	Michael Patrick King	Liz Feldman	January 13, 2016	3J5056	6.52
102	8	"And the Basketball Jones"	Katy Garretson	Morgan Murphy	January 20, 2016	3J5058	6.64
103	9	"And the Sax Problem"	John Riggi	Charles Brottmiller	January 27, 2016	3J5059	6.63
104	10	"And the No New Friends"	Anthony Rich	Rob Sheridan	February 3, 2016	3J5060	6.34
105	11	"And the Booth Babes"	Joel Murray	Rachel Lind & David Shecter	February 10, 2016	3J5061	6.36
106	12	"And the Story Telling Show"	Tom Stern	Morgan Murphy	February 18, 2016	3J5062	6.40
107	13	"And the Lost Baggage"	James Burrows	Michael Patrick King	February 25, 2016	3J5063	6.56
108	14	"And You Bet Your Ass"	James Burrows	Liz Astrof & Michelle Nader	March 3, 2016	3J5064	6.74
109	15	"And the Great Escape"	John Riggi	Liz Feldman	March 10, 2016	3J5065	6.54
110	16	"And the Pity Party Bus"	Don Scardino	Rachel Sweet	March 31, 2016	3J5066	5.69
111	17	"And the Show and Don't Tell"	Don Scardino	Patrick Walsh	April 7, 2016	3J5067	5.87
112	18	"And the Loophole"	Don Scardino	Justin Sayre	April 14, 2016	3J5068	6.25
113	19	"And the Attack of the Killer Apartment"	Kathleen Marshall	Charles Brottmiller	April 21, 2016	3J5069	6.93
114	20	"And the Partnership Hits the Fan"	Katy Garretson	Rob Sheridan	April 28, 2016	3J5070	6.61
115	21	"And the Ten Inches"	Katy Garretson	Liz Feldman	May 5, 2016	3J5071	6.67
116	22	"And the Big Gamble"	Michael Patrick King	Michelle Nader & Liz Astrof	May 12, 2016	3J5072	6.99

=== Season 6 (2016–17) ===
No. overall	No. in season	Title	Directed by	Written by	Original release date	Prod. code	U.S. viewers (millions)
117	1	"And the Two Openings: Parts 1 & 2"	Fred Savage	Michelle Nader	October 10, 2016	T26.11151	6.36
118	2	"And the Two Openings: Parts 1 & 2"	Fred Savage	Liz Astrof	October 10, 2016	T26.11152	6.36
119	3	"And the 80's Movie"	Fred Savage	Patrick Walsh	October 17, 2016	T26.11153	5.66
120	4	"And the Godmama Drama"	Kathleen Marshall	Michael Lisbe & Nate Reger	October 24, 2016	T26.11154	5.60
121	5	"And the College Experience"	Kathleen Marshall	Brian Rubenstein	October 31, 2016	T26.11155	4.99
122	6	"And the Rom-Commie"	Lonny Price	Justin Sayre	November 7, 2016	T26.11156	5.42
123	7	"And the Sophie Doll"	Don Scardino	Michael Glouberman	November 14, 2016	T26.11157	5.18
124	8	"And the Duck Stamp"	Don Scardino	Charles Brottmiller	November 21, 2016	T26.11158	5.37
125	9	"And the About FaceTime"	Steve Zuckerman	Rachel Palmer & David Shecter	December 5, 2016	T26.11159	5.68
126	10	"And the Himmicane"	Steve Zuckerman	Brian Rubenstein	December 12, 2016	T26.11160	5.81
127	11	"And the Planes, Fingers and Automobiles"	Anthony Rich	Patrick Walsh	December 19, 2016	T26.11161	5.02
128	12	"And the Riverboat Runs Through It"	Jason Ensler	Michelle Nader	January 2, 2017	T26.11162	5.88
129	13	"And the Stalking Dead"	John Riggi	Michael Lisbe & Nate Reger	January 16, 2017	T26.11163	6.40
130	14	"And the Emergency Contractor"	John Riggi	Liz Astrof	January 23, 2017	T26.11164	7.06
131	15	"And the Turtle Sense"	Don Scardino	Michael Glouberman	February 6, 2017	T26.11165	5.98
132	16	"And the Tease Time"	Don Scardino	Justin Sayre	February 13, 2017	T26.11166	6.00
133	17	"And the Jessica Shmessica"	Don Scardino	Charles Brottmiller	February 20, 2017	T26.11167	5.81
134	18	"And the Dad Day Afternoon"	John Riggi	Julie Mandel-Folly	February 27, 2017	T26.11168	5.74
135	19	"And the Baby and Other Things"	Chris Poulos	Story by : Michael Lisbe & Nate Reger & Justin Sayre; Teleplay by : Brian Rubenstein	March 13, 2017	T26.11169	5.45
136	20	"And the Alley-Oops"	Jude Weng	Story by : Charles Brottmiller; Teleplay by : Patrick Walsh & Michael Glouberman	March 20, 2017	T26.11170	4.66
137	21	"And the Rock Me on the Dais"	Michelle Nader	Liz Astrof	April 10, 2017	T26.11171	4.64
138	22	"And 2 Broke Girls: The Movie"	Kathleen Marshall	Michelle Nader	April 17, 2017	T26.11172	4.57
