= Tolsky =

Tolsky is a surname. Notable people with the surname include:

- Amy Tolsky (born 1961), American actress
- Susan Tolsky (1943–2022), American actress
