= The Hawk (TV series) =

American comedy television series

- Genre: Comedy
- Created by: Will Ferrell; Harper Steele; Chris Henchy
- Starring: Will Ferrell; Molly Shannon; Jimmy Tatro; Fortune Feimster; Chris Parnell; Katelyn Tarver; Gabriel Hogan; Luke Wilson; Aida Osman; Keith David
- Music by: The Octopus Project
- Country of origin: United States
- Original language: English
- No. of seasons: 1
- No. of episodes: 10

Production
- Executive producers: Will Ferrell; Jessica Elbaum; Alix Taylor; Rian Johnson; Ram Bergman; Nena Rodrigue; Chris Henchy; Harper Steele; David Gordon Green; Andrew Guest
- Running time: 28–37 minutes
- Production companies: Gloria Sanchez Productions; Rough House Pictures; Guest Spot; T-Street; PGA Tour Studios

Original release
- Network: Netflix
- Release: July 16, 2026

The Hawk is an American comedy television series created by Will Ferrell, Harper Steele, and Chris Henchy, and starring Ferrell and Molly Shannon. It premiered on Netflix on July 16, 2026.

== Synopsis ==
Lonnie "The Hawk" Hawkins, a washed-up, former No. 1 ranked golfer in the world, looks to recapture his glory days and win the U.S. Open to complete the Career Grand Slam and avenge his loss that sent him to retirement early. He also tries to reconnect with his estranged wife who focuses on selling and expanding her brand of hard iced tea "Teed Off" and his son who is opposed to him and has criminal ties.

== Cast ==
- Will Ferrell as Lonnie "The Hawk" Hawkins, a famous golfer with an uncouth demeanor and an unorthodox golfing style
- Molly Shannon as Stacy, Lonnie's estranged wife
- Jimmy Tatro as Lance Hawkins, Lonnie's son and ascending golfer for the PGA Tour
- Fortune Feimster as Sam, Lonnie's new caddy
- Chris Parnell as Anton Floyd, a board member of the PGA Tour who hates Lonnie and his wild, untraditional style of golf
- Katelyn Tarver as Natalie, Lance's fiancée
- David Hornsby as Radford, Stacy's travel companion and extramarital lover
- Luke Wilson as Golden Fisk, Lonnie's longtime rival
- Gabriel Hogan as Jerry, Lance's fitness trainer
- Keith David as Old Henry, Lonnie's former caddy and longtime best friend
- Aida Osman as Crystal, Old Henry's daughter
- Brian Howe as Gus, Sam’s father and crime boss

== Production ==
On April 19, 2023, it was announced that a comedy series about "a professional golfer who becomes the face of a controversial new league competing with the PGA Tour" starring Will Ferrell, was in development at Ferrell and Jessica Elbaum's Gloria Sanchez Productions and Rian Johnson and Ram Bergman's T-Street Productions.

On May 15, 2024, the series was given the title Golf, and it was announced that the series would be co-created by Ferrell, Ramy Youssef, and Josh Rabinowitz, and would star Ferrell and Youssef. The series would be executive produced by Ferrell, Jessica Elbaum, and Alix Taylor through Gloria Sanchez Productions, Rian Johnson, Ram Bergman, and Nena Rodrigue through T-Street Productions, Youssef and Andy Campagna for Cairo Cowboy, and Rabinowitz.

On August 5, 2025, it was reported that Molly Shannon had joined the series, with Youssef and Rabinowitz having left the project the previous year due to creative differences. In September 2025, Jimmy Tatro, Fortune Feimster, Chris Parnell, Katelyn Tarver, and David Hornsby joined the cast.

In March 2026, Netflix announced that the series was retitled The Hawk.

== Episodes ==
No.	Title	Directed by	Written by	Original release date
1	"The Hawk"	David Gordon Green	Story by : Will Ferrell & Harper Steele & Chris Henchy; Teleplay by : Harper Steele & Chris Henchy	July 16, 2026
2	"The Family That Plays Together"	David Gordon Green	Harper Steele & Chris Henchy	July 16, 2026
3	"Roses & Thorns"	Chris Henchy	Andrew Guest	July 16, 2026
4	"Tears of a Hero"	Chris Henchy	Paul Welsh & Madeline Walter	July 16, 2026
5	"The Prison Yard"	Shiri Appleby	Cameron Squires	July 16, 2026
6	"The Genesis Invitational"	Shiri Appleby	Emma Rathbone	July 16, 2026
7	"Vegas"	Jonathan Watson	Jerry Collins	July 16, 2026
8	"The Code"	Jonathan Watson	Carolina Barlow	July 16, 2026
9	"Pebble"	David Gordon Green	Paul Welsh & Madeline Walter	July 16, 2026
10	"Pickle"	David Gordon Green	Harper Steele & Chris Henchy	July 16, 2026

== Release ==
The Hawk premiered on Netflix on July 16, 2026.

== Reception ==
On the review aggregator website Rotten Tomatoes, the series holds an approval rating of 31%, based on 51 reviews, with an average of rated reviews of 4.8/10. The website's critics consensus reads, "A swing for the comedy fences, The Hawk may miss more often than it connects but still finds moments of the chaotic charm that made Will Ferrell a standout." Metacritic, which uses a weighted average, assigned a score of 52 out of 100 based on 20 critics, indicating "mixed or average" reviews.
