= Nick Zano =

American actor (born 1978)

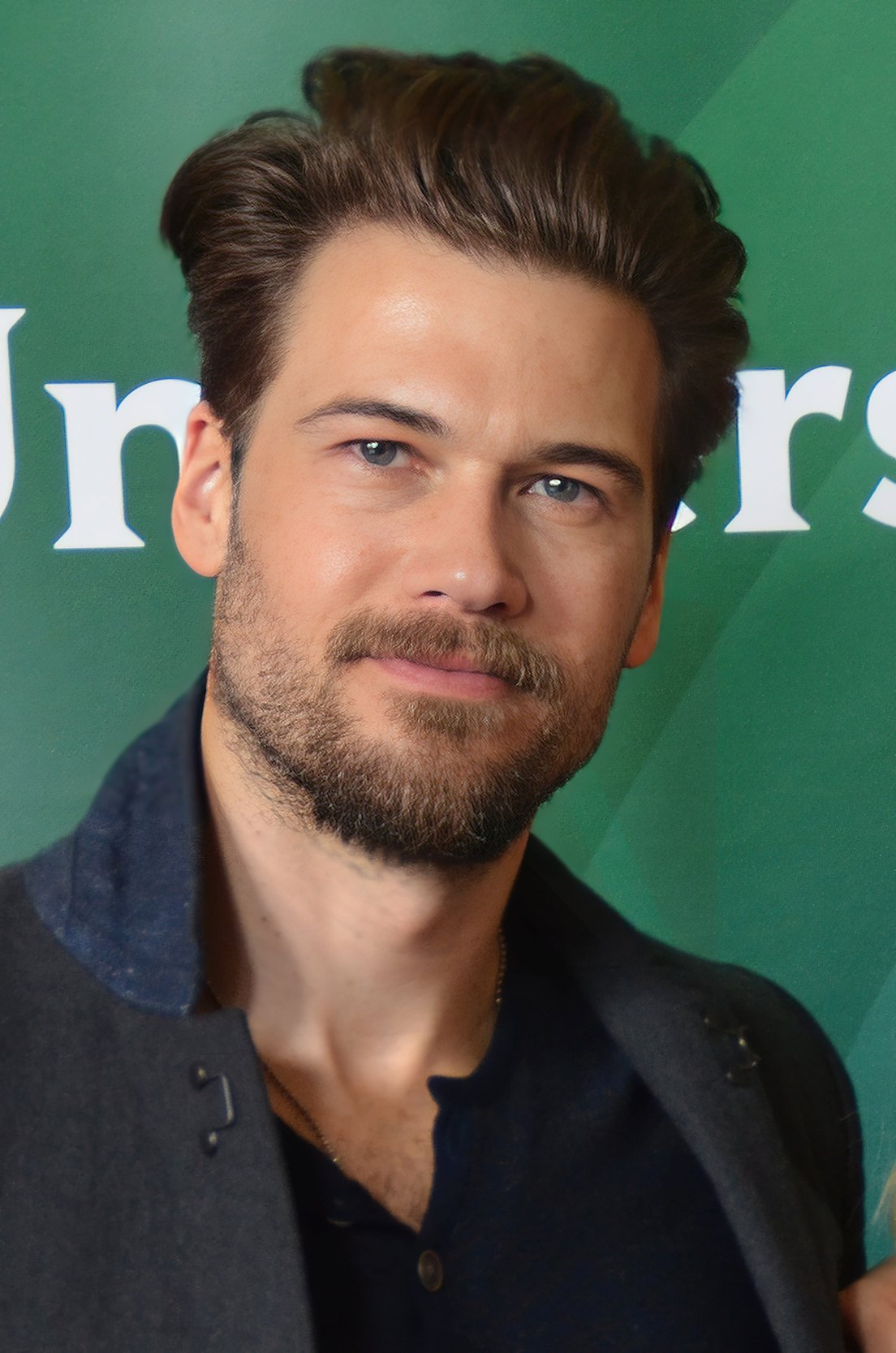
- Zano at the 2015 Television Critics Association's Press Tour
- Born: Nick Zano; March 8, 1978 (age 48); Nutley, New Jersey, U.S.
- Occupation: Actor
- Years active: 2002–present
- Partner(s): Leah Renee Cudmore (2014–present)
- Children: 2

Nick Zano (born March 8, 1978) is an American actor. He played Vince in The WB's sitcom What I Like About You. He hosted MTV's infotainment program about the film industry Movie House as part of his work as an MTV News correspondent before he began an acting career. His recurring roles on television include Drew Pragin on Melrose Place, Pete on Happy Endings, P.J. Hillingsbrook on 90210, and Johnny on 2 Broke Girls. He also starred as a lead on the NBC sitcom One Big Happy and as Arthur Watson in the TV series Minority Report. He is best known as Dr. Nathaniel "Nate" Heywood / Steel in The CW Arrowverse, starring on Legends of Tomorrow.

== Early life ==
Nick Zano was born in Nutley, New Jersey. He lived in Florida as a child. While attending Wellington High School he was active in the drama and television departments. Throughout his junior and senior years, he and his classmates produced a weekly off-beat skit comedy show that aired on the school's television station. While working on the show, Zano also wrote, starred in and directed student films that made their way to the JVC Universal Film Competition, a festival in which over 800 local high schools participate.

== Career ==
Shortly after graduating from high school, Zano moved to Hanover, Pennsylvania, and landed a job developing films and television projects for a small production company. During that time, he also was the associate producer for Living Position, a World AIDS Day television special hosted by Lou Diamond Phillips. While selling shoes in a trendy Los Angeles boutique, a customer went back to her office and told her supervisors she'd just met a man who would be a wonderful on-air personality. The woman was an employee at MTV, which led to Zano's hosting job of MTV News' Movie House. In 2003, he landed the role of Vince in The WB's sitcom What I Like About You, starring Amanda Bynes and Jennie Garth. Zano made his first appearance in the second season and remained until the fourth and final season, which ended March 24, 2006. Afterwards, he went on to host and executive produce his MTV reality show Why Can't I Be You?.

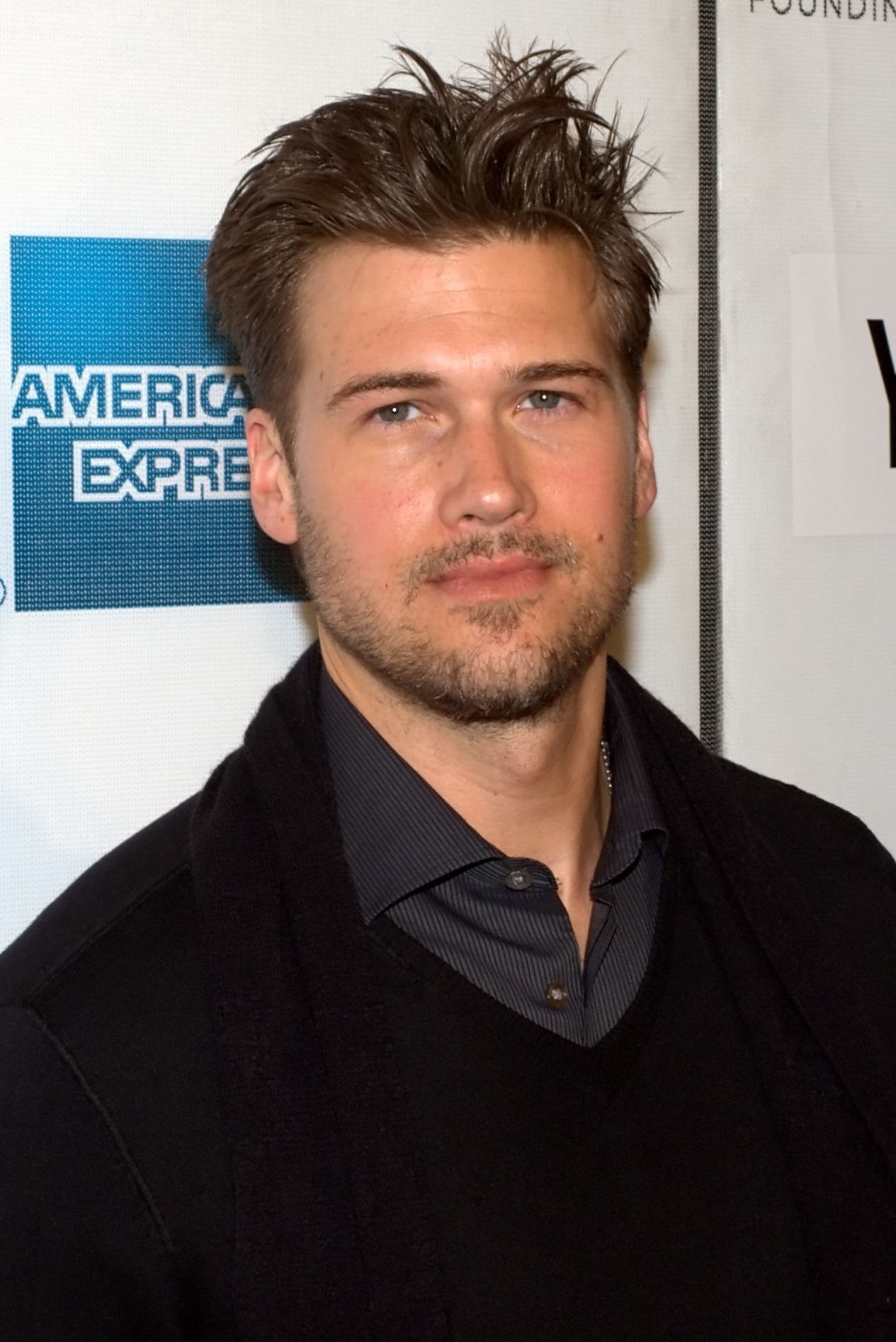
Zano at the Tribeca Film Festival premiere of Earth Made of Glass in April 2010

The following year, Zano appeared alongside Haylie Duff and Frankie Muniz in the independent romantic comedy My Sexiest Year. The film, which received mixed reviews, had its world premiere at the 2007 Hamptons International Film Festival. In 2008 he appeared in a supporting role opposite Drake Bell in MGM's teen comedy film College. Zano also appeared in Beverly Hills Chihuahua and Joy Ride 2: Dead Ahead later that year. In 2009, Zano co-starred in The Final Destination, the fourth installment of the Final Destination film series. He also guest starred on the ABC sitcom Cougar Town, starring Courteney Cox. In 2010, he had a recurring role on The CW's Melrose Place.

In 2011, Zano started a recurring role on 2 Broke Girls as Johnny, a graffiti artist who regularly flirts with Max Black (Kat Dennings). That same year, he also co-starred in the romantic comedy Scents and Sensibility as Brandon. In 2012, Zano scored a recurring role on another CW series, 90210, in which he played Preston Hillingsbrook, a billionaire who goes into business with Annie Wilson (Shenae Grimes). On November 27, 2011, Zano starred as David Morretti in the ABC Family Christmas themed movie Desperately Seeking Santa opposite Laura Vandervoort. Beginning in December 2012, Zano began a recurring role in season three of the ABC sitcom Happy Endings as Pete, Penny Hartz (Casey Wilson)'s new love interest. In 2013, Zano appeared on Mom as David, Christy Plunkett (Anna Faris)'s boyfriend for two episodes.

In February 2014, Zano signed on to play the male lead in Liz Feldman and Ellen DeGeneres' NBC comedy pilot One Big Happy. The show centers on Lizzy (played by Elisha Cuthbert), a lesbian who gets pregnant just as her straight male best friend Luke (the father of the child), played by Zano, meets and marries the love of his life, Prudence (Kelly Brook). The show was ordered to series on May 9, 2014, and debuted mid-season in early 2015. In 2015, Zano starred as Arthur Watson, described as having a hard shell, borne of years of difficult experience in the outside world that fellow "precog" Dash Parker (Stark Sands) avoided, in the Fox drama Minority Report, based on the 2002 Steven Spielberg film of the same name.

From 2016 to 2022, Zano starred as Dr. Nate Heywood/Citizen Steel, a historian whose grandfather Henry (Matthew MacCaull) was the hero known as Commander Steel, a member of the Justice Society of America on The CW series Legends of Tomorrow. He starred on the show's latter six seasons, appearing in 94 episodes.

== Personal life ==
From 2011 to 2014, Zano dated his 2 Broke Girls co-star Kat Dennings. Since then, Zano is in a long-term relationship with actress Leah Renee Cudmore. In July 2016, she gave birth to their son. Their second child, a daughter, was born in 2018.

== Filmography ==
=== Film ===
Year	Title	Role	Notes
2002	Catch Me If You Can	James	Uncredited
2004	Fat Albert	Camera Salesman	
2005	Everything You Want	Quinn Andrews	
2007	My Sexiest Year	Pierce	
2008	College	Teague	
2008	Beverly Hills Chihuahua	Bryan	
2008	Joy Ride 2: Dead Ahead	Bobby Lawrence	
2009	The Final Destination	Hunt Wynorski	
2011	Scents and Sensibility	Brandon Hurst	
2011	10 Years	Nick Vanillo	
2013	Lost Luck	James	

=== Television ===
Year	Title	Role	Notes
2003–2006	What I Like About You	Vince	54 episodes
2005	One Tree Hill	Himself	Episode: "Somewhere a Clock Is Ticking"
2007	7th Heaven	Dr. Jonathan Sanderson	3 episodes
2009	Cougar Town	Josh	5 episodes
2010	Melrose Place	Drew Pragin	5 episodes
2010–2011	The Secret Life of the American Teenager	Dr. Miller	2 episodes
2011	Drop Dead Diva	Tim Klein	Episode: "Hit and Run"
2011	Desperately Seeking Santa	David Moretti	Television film
2011–2012	2 Broke Girls	Johnny	9 episodes
2012	90210	Preston Hillingsbrook	6 episodes
2012–2013	Happy Endings	Pete	8 episodes
2014	Mom	David	2 episodes
2014	Friends with Better Lives	Handy Randy	Episode: "Pros and Cons"
2015	One Big Happy	Luke	6 episodes
2015	Minority Report	Arthur Watson	10 episodes
2016–2022	Legends of Tomorrow	Nate Heywood / Steel	94 episodes
2016	Arrow	Nate Heywood / Steel	Episode: "Invasion!"
2023	Obliterated	Chad McKnight	8 episodes
