= Will & Harper =

2024 American documentary film

- Release poster
- Directed by: Josh Greenbaum
- Produced by: Justin Baldoni; Jessica Elbaum; Will Ferrell; Josh Greenbaum; Christopher Leggett; Rafael Marmor
- Starring: Will Ferrell; Harper Steele
- Cinematography: Zoë White
- Edited by: Monique Zavistovski
- Music by: Nathan Halpern
- Production companies: Wayfarer Studios; Delirio Films; Gloria Sanchez Productions
- Distributed by: Netflix
- Release dates: January 22, 2024 (Sundance); September 13, 2024 (United States)
- Running time: 114 minutes
- Country: United States
- Language: English

Will & Harper is a 2024 American documentary film directed by Josh Greenbaum and following actor Will Ferrell and writer Harper Steele as the duo make a 17-day road trip across the United States, the latter having recently completed a gender transition. It was produced by Jessica Elbaum, Ferrell, Greenbaum, Christopher Leggett, and Rafael Marmor.

Will & Harper premiered at the 40th Sundance Film Festival on January 22, 2024, received a limited theatrical release in the United States on September 13, and began streaming worldwide on Netflix on September 27. It received positive reviews from critics and was named one of the top 5 documentary films of 2024 by the National Board of Review. The film won a Peabody Award at the 85th Annual Ceremony. The film received a BAFTA nomination for Best Documentary at the 2025 BAFTA Film Awards.

== Plot ==
In 2021, Will Ferrell received an email from his longtime friend and Saturday Night Live colleague Harper Steele in which she came out as transgender. Two years later, Steele and Ferrell meet with Steele's daughters at a restaurant before beginning their road trip. The pair start in New York City, where they visit Studio 8H and have a reunion with several SNL cast members and alumni.

Ferrell and Steele travel to Washington, D.C., then talk about Steele's identity and their friendship in a parking lot where they briefly meet a fan. At Beech Grove, Indiana, they attend a basketball game where they encounter Governor Eric Holcomb. Soon after, they learn Holcomb has signed into law a bill banning gender-affirming care for minors in Indiana, and hear other reports of anti-trans laws in the country.

In Peoria, Illinois, they meet Dana, another trans woman who transitioned later in life. Dana explains that her childhood was burdened by the mismatch between her gender identity and others' perceptions.

On the way to Iowa City, Iowa, Steele and Ferrell contact Kristen Wiig and ask her to write a song for their road trip. Once in Iowa City, they meet with Steele's sister, Eleanor. Steele recounts a story of being given frilly bell-bottoms by Eleanor, loving them, but ultimately not wearing them after receiving homophobic slurs for it. Steele also recalls her childhood as she looks through baby photos, visits her childhood home, and rides a unicycle.

They next go to Meeker, Oklahoma, where Steele enters a dive bar alone, before later being joined by Ferrell upon her request. Following this, they go to a steakhouse in Amarillo, Texas where the social media comments are revealed to be filled with prejudice against Steele. Ferrell dresses up as Sherlock Holmes in the hopes of getting a laugh out of the audience, but also unintentionally draws attention to Harper and her trans identity. Though Ferrell now looks back on the encounter as being extremely transphobic, he was unable to resonate with Steele's fears in the moment. Everyone crowds around Ferrell due to his fame. As they continue on their trip afterwards, Steele admits to previously having suicidal thoughts, which had made her swear off from buying a gun.

In Albuquerque, New Mexico, they ride a hot-air balloon with Will Forte. After, they go to Grand Canyon National Park, where the woman taking their picture shares that she is a retired therapist and once had a patient with gender dysphoria, but was regrettably close-minded towards them. Their next stop is Las Vegas, where they go to SW Steakhouse; Steele buys a dress and has her makeup done, while Ferrell buys a wig and mustache to disguise himself. During their dinner, Steele acknowledges that while Ferrell being her companion is why she has not received much open transphobia, it has also given her self-confidence.

The pair go to Trona, San Bernardino County, California, where Steele reveals she had purchased the house several years back, as a means to escape from society and be able to perform as a woman. The house now, however, has been vandalized. They have an emotional moment where Steele breaks down and Ferrell comforts her, with the former saying that even if she had stayed in Trona, she would have had to hide from the community and keep her true self only within the house. As they leave, they light the fireworks and flares they had bought from Oklahoma.

On their last day, Steele gives in to Ferrell's demand for Dunkin' Donuts, for which he had been asking the whole trip. Their final stop is Los Angeles, where they first go to a nail salon with Molly Shannon and talk to her about what they learned about each other during the road trip. After, Steele and Ferrell go to a beach where they reminisce over the trip, their friendship, and the future; Ferrell also gifts Steele diamond earrings. Steele then suggests they do another road trip back to New York City, to which Ferrell agrees.

As the movie ends, Wiig reveals to have finished the song, naming it "Harper and Will Go West", which plays over the credits along with miscellaneous footage from their trip.

== Cast ==
- Harper Steele
- Will Ferrell
- Kristen Wiig
- Will Forte
- Molly Shannon
- Tina Fey
- Lorne Michaels
- Seth Meyers
- Colin Jost
- Tim Meadows
- Paula Pell

== Production ==
Comedian Will Ferrell and writer Harper Steele met at the American sketch comedy television program Saturday Night Live where Ferrell was a cast member for several years; they later co-wrote Eurovision Song Contest: The Story of Fire Saga. Steele reached out to Ferrell among other friends during the COVID-19 pandemic in 2021 to inform them of her intention to go through gender transition.

Ferrell helped produce the film, documenting a road trip the two subsequently took, alongside Jessica Elbaum, Christopher Leggett, and Rafael Marmor. The filmmakers initially considered deliberately creating comedic moments, but decided to let funny moments occur spontaneously instead.

== Release ==
The film premiered at the 2024 Sundance Film Festival. In February 2024, Netflix acquired distribution rights to the film. It was also played at the Toronto International Film Festival on September 5, 2024.

== Reception ==
=== Critical response ===
On the review aggregator website Rotten Tomatoes, 99% of 122 critics' reviews are positive, with an average rating of 7.9/10. The website's consensus reads: "Endearing and heartfelt, Will & Harper is an ode and testament to long-lasting love, acceptance and evolution within a friendship." Metacritic, which uses a weighted average, assigned the film a score of 75 out of 100, based on 22 critics, indicating "generally favorable" reviews.

The New York Times critic Manohla Dargis called the film "A Transcendent Road Trip," and summarized that "a documentary about Will Ferrell and his friend Harper Steele brought the house down" at the Sundance Film Festival. At Collider, Taylor Gates rated this an 8 out of 10 and characterized it as a "must-watch", praising the principals' openness and the mixture of educational and entertainment elements, but critiquing the pacing. The Daily Beast's Kevin Fallon opined that this film will save lives for being "brave and characteristically unusual". Benjamin Lee of The Guardian rated this film 3 out of 5 stars, writing that "there are enough earned moments of piercing sadness and shaggy humour that those that feel more engineered can distract, the film trying to force itself into the structure of something it doesn't need to be, pushing us away just after we've been pulled in close". Lovia Gyarkye of The Hollywood Reporter stated that the film "works because, at its core, the doc is a tribute to Ferrell and Steele's evolving friendship" and that the pair's "level of honesty keeps the conversations grounded and helps the documentary avoid turning Steele into a prop for Ferrell's education". Lauren Wissot of IndieWire graded the documentary a B−, stating that the narrative is "admirable and understandable" but "trapped in a mushy middle state, forever prevented from rising to the level of either great drama or great comedy".

In a capsule review out of Sundance, Brian Tallerico of RogerEbert.com praised Greenbaum's direction and continued that the film shows "a pure, true companionship here that should serve as a reminder to call that person in your life who might need someone to talk to". In Rolling Stone David Fear called Will & Harper "a portrait of a friendship and how the fundamentals of a deep and lasting bond doesn't change even when the people within it do" that is "flawed" but "priceless". Writing for United Press International, Fred Topel ended his review calling this "a touching journey with two friends sharing laughs that can help start more conversations amongst people Steele and Ferrell will never meet". Peter Debruge of Variety wrote that "It can sound like a cliché to say that any given movie is what the world needs now, but Will & Harper earns that distinction. Struggling to recognize her own beauty in a society that often seems determined to deny her identity altogether, Steele brings the trans experience down to earth. Meanwhile, by accepting his fledgling gal pal on her own terms—and asking how to make her more comfortable in her own skin—Ferrell sets the best kind of example. We should all be so lucky as to have friends like these." Bilge Ebiri of Vulture ended his review: "The film's familiarity may well be part of its design. It clearly wants to help change hearts and minds, and find purchase with audiences that would otherwise avoid a movie with a subject like this."

=== Accolades ===
Award	Date	Category	Nominee(s)	Result	Ref.
Toronto International Film Festival	September 15, 2024	People's Choice Award: Documentaries	Will & Harper	Runner-up	
Critics' Choice Documentary Awards	November 10, 2024	Best Documentary Feature	Will & Harper	Won (Note: Tied with Super/Man: The Christopher Reeve Story)	
Critics' Choice Documentary Awards	November 10, 2024	Best Director	Josh Greenbaum	Nominated	
Critics' Choice Documentary Awards	November 10, 2024	Best Score	Nathan Halpern	Nominated	
Critics' Choice Documentary Awards	November 10, 2024	Best Cinematography	Zoë White	Nominated	
Hollywood Music in Media Awards	November 20, 2024	Best Original Score – Documentary	Nathan Halpern	Nominated	
Hollywood Music in Media Awards	November 20, 2024	Best Original Song – Documentary	"Harper and Will Go West" – Sean Douglas, Kristen Wiig, and Josh Greenbaum	Nominated	
National Board of Review	December 4, 2024	Top 5 Documentaries	Will & Harper	Won (Note: This award does not have a single winner, but recognizes multiple films.)	
Astra Film Awards	December 8, 2024	Best Documentary Feature	Will & Harper	Nominated	
Astra Creative Arts Awards	December 8, 2024	Best Original Song	"Harper and Will Go West" – Sean Douglas, Kristen Wiig, and Josh Greenbaum	Nominated	
Washington D.C. Area Film Critics Association	December 8, 2024	Best Documentary	Will & Harper	Nominated	
San Diego Film Critics Society	December 9, 2024	Best Documentary	Will & Harper	Nominated	
St. Louis Film Critics Association	December 15, 2024	Best Documentary Feature	Will & Harper	Nominated	
San Francisco Bay Area Film Critics Circle	December 15, 2024	Best Documentary Feature	Will & Harper	Nominated	
Seattle Film Critics Society	December 16, 2024	Best Documentary Film	Will & Harper	Nominated	
Dallas–Fort Worth Film Critics Association	December 18, 2024	Best Documentary Film	Will & Harper	3rd place	
Florida Film Critics Circle	December 20, 2024	Best Documentary Film	Will & Harper	Won	
Austin Film Critics Association	January 6, 2025	Best Documentary Film	Will & Harper	Won	
AARP Movies for Grownups Awards	January 11, 2025	Best Documentary	Will & Harper	Nominated	
Cinema Eye Honors	January 9, 2024	Audience Choize Prize	Will & Harper	Nominated	
Cinema Eye Honors	January 9, 2024	The Unforgettables	Harper Steele	Won	
American Cinema Editors Awards	March 14, 2025	Best Edited Documentary (Theatrical)	Monique Zavistovski	Won	
Alliance of Women Film Journalists	January 7, 2025	Best Documentary Film	Will & Harper	Nominated	
Dorian Awards	February 15, 2025	Documentary of the Year	Will & Harper	Won	
Dorian Awards	February 15, 2025	LGBTQ Documentary of the Year	Will & Harper	Won	
Golden Reel Awards	February 23, 2025	Outstanding Achievement in Sound Editing – Feature Documentary	Zach Seivers, George Pereyra, Adam Parrish King, and Jared K. Neal	Nominated	
Academy of Television Arts & Sciences	May 1, 2025	Television Academy Honors Award	A Netflix Documentary / A Wayfarer Studios Film / A Delirio Films Production / A Gloria Sanchez Production	Won	
Peabody Awards	May 1, 2025	Documentary	A Netflix Documentary / A Wayfarer Studios Film / A Delirio Films Production / A Gloria Sanchez Production	Won	
Primetime Emmy Awards	September 6–7, 2025	Outstanding Documentary or Nonfiction Special	Rafael Marmor, Christopher Leggett, Will Ferrell, Jessica Elbaum, and Josh Greenbaum	Nominated	
Primetime Emmy Awards	September 6–7, 2025	Outstanding Directing for a Documentary/Nonfiction Program	Josh Greenbaum	Nominated	
Primetime Emmy Awards	September 6–7, 2025	Outstanding Cinematography for a Nonfiction Program	Zoë White	Nominated	
Primetime Emmy Awards	September 6–7, 2025	Outstanding Original Music and Lyrics	"Harper and Will Go West" – Sean Douglas, Kristen Wiig, and Josh Greenbaum	Nominated	
Primetime Emmy Awards	September 6–7, 2025	Outstanding Picture Editing for a Nonfiction Program	Monique Zavistovski and Lori Lovoy-Goran	Nominated	
