= One Big Happy (TV series) =

American sitcom

- Genre: Sitcom
- Created by: Liz Feldman; Ellen DeGeneres
- Starring: Kelly Brook; Elisha Cuthbert; Nick Zano; Rebecca Corry; Chris Williams; Brandon Mychal Smith
- Music by: Steve Hampton; John Adair
- Country of origin: United States
- Original language: English
- No. of seasons: 1
- No. of episodes: 6

Production
- Executive producers: Ellen DeGeneres; Jeff Kleeman; Liz Feldman; Scott Ellis
- Producer: Jay Kleckner
- Camera setup: Multi-camera
- Running time: 22 minutes
- Production companies: Visualized, Inc.; A Very Good Production; Warner Bros. Television

Original release
- Network: NBC
- Release: March 17 – April 28, 2015

One Big Happy is an American sitcom television series produced by Ellen DeGeneres starring Kelly Brook, Nick Zano and Elisha Cuthbert, about a gay woman, Lizzy, who is pregnant with her best friend Luke's baby, while he is in love with another woman, Prudence. The show was created by Liz Feldman, and it premiered on March 17, 2015. Six episodes were ordered by NBC.

On May 8, 2015, NBC cancelled the series after one season. It was produced by Visualized, Inc., in association with A Very Good Production and Warner Bros. Television.

== Cast ==
- Elisha Cuthbert as Lizzy
- Nick Zano as Luke
- Kelly Brook as Prudence
- Rebecca Corry as Leisha
- Chris Williams as Roy
- Brandon Mychal Smith as Marcus

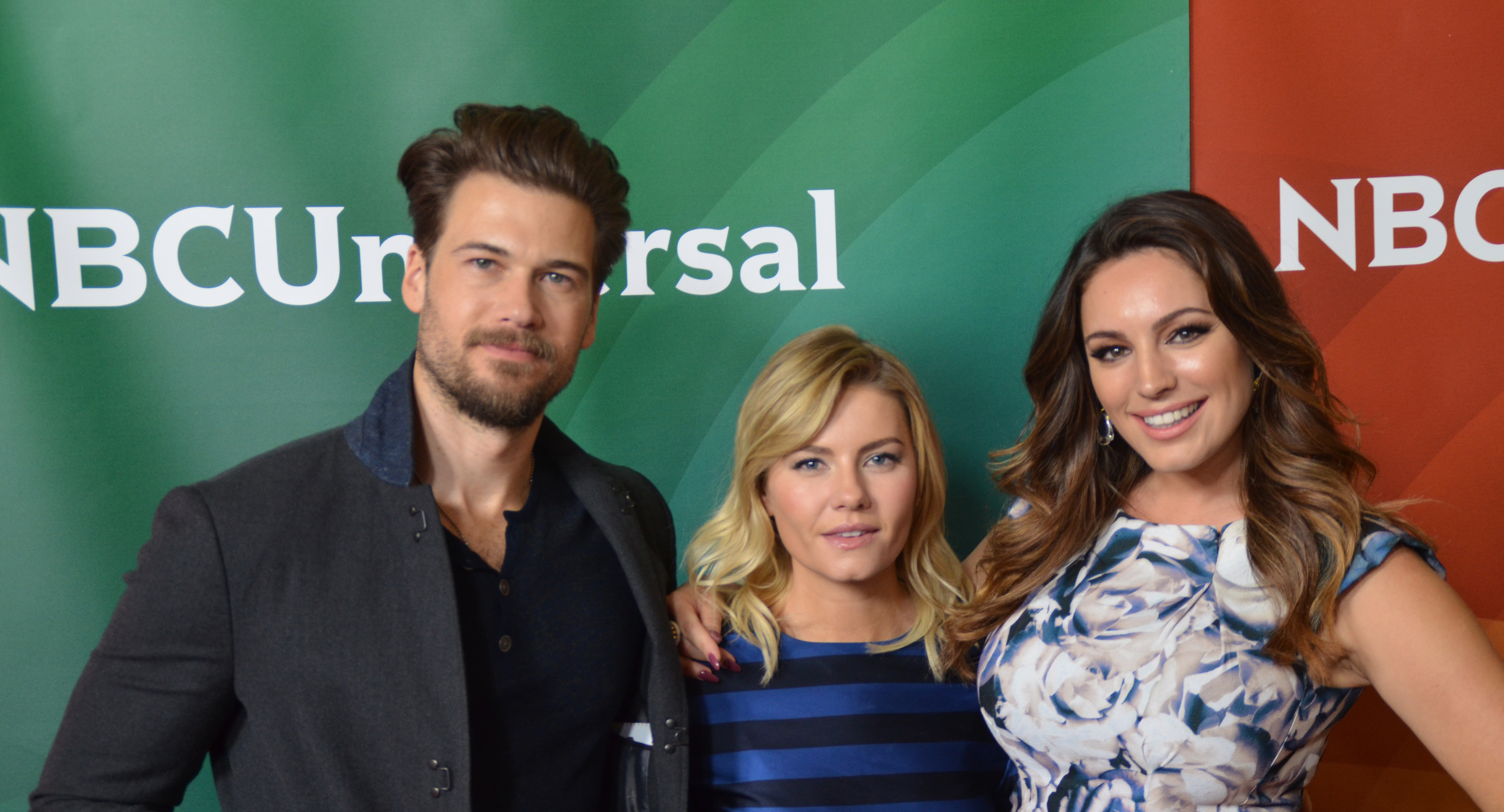
The show's three leads at the NBCUniversal press tour promoting the show

== Episodes ==
No.	Title	Directed by	Written by	Original release date	Prod. code	US viewers (millions)
1	"Pilot"	Scott Ellis	Liz Feldman	March 17, 2015	276080	5.47
Best friends Lizzy and Luke's plans to have a baby together are suddenly derailed when Luke meets British woman Prudence. Luke marries Prudence on their second date so that she can stay in the country but then Lizzy reveals that her pregnancy attempt has been a success.
2	"Out of the Closet"	David Trainer	Liz Feldman	March 24, 2015	4X6902	3.79
While the trio attempt to adjust to their new living arrangements, Prudence's attempt to help Lizzy move on from an old girlfriend result in Lizzy going on another date with her ex, while Luke is uncomfortable about Prudence's old puppets.
3	"Crushing It"	Linda Mendoza	Vanessa McCarthy	March 31, 2015	4X6904	3.82
Lizzy scores a date with a woman she has been crushing on at her local gym, but the relationship is abruptly halted when the woman is revealed to be a nurse working for Lizzy's gynecologist; meanwhile, Prudence feels dejected when she realizes that there is no clear term for her role in Luke and Lizzy's developing family.
4	"Flight Risk"	Shelley Jensen	Nastaran Dibai	April 14, 2015	4X6903	3.57
Luke's concerns that Prudence may get bored with him result in him alienating Lizzy and pushing himself too hard on various risky stunts.
5	"A Tale of Two Hubbies"	Katy Garretson	Gregg Mettler	April 21, 2015	4X6905	3.76
Prudence, Lizzy and Luke head to Vegas and learn that the marriage wasn't legal. Lizzy decides to help them have a new wedding. However they learn that Prudence was married to Martin (Steve Valentine) in England and despite her signing divorce papers, he didn't.
6	"Wedlocked"	Shelley Jensen	Liz Feldman	April 28, 2015	4X6906	3.08
Luke disappears after learning about Prudence being married in England. While Lizzy tries to console Prudence and fix the situation, Luke hits the bars with Marcus.

== Reception ==
One Big Happy received generally negative reviews from critics. At Metacritic (which assigns a weighted mean—out of 100—based on reviews from mainstream critics) the show received a weighted mean score of 37 from 21 reviews.
