= Am I OK? =

2022 film by Tig Notaro and Stephanie Allynne

- Release poster
- Directed by: Tig Notaro; Stephanie Allynne
- Written by: Lauren Pomerantz
- Produced by: Jessica Elbaum; Will Ferrell; Erik Feig; Lucy Kitada; Dakota Johnson; Ro Donnelly; Stephanie Allynne; Tig Notaro; Lauren Pomerantz
- Starring: Dakota Johnson; Sonoya Mizuno; Jermaine Fowler; Kiersey Clemons; Molly Gordon; Whitmer Thomas; Odessa A'zion; Sean Hayes; Tig Notaro
- Cinematography: Cristina Dunlap
- Edited by: Kayla M. Emter; Glen Scantlebury
- Music by: Craig Wedren; Annie Clark
- Production companies: Picturestart; Gloria Sanchez Productions; TeaTime Pictures; Something Fierce Productions
- Distributed by: Warner Bros. Pictures; Max
- Release dates: January 24, 2022 (Sundance); June 6, 2024 (United States)
- Running time: 86 minutes
- Country: United States
- Language: English

Am I OK? is a 2022 American comedy-drama film directed by Tig Notaro and Stephanie Allynne and written by Lauren Pomerantz. It stars Dakota Johnson, Sonoya Mizuno, Jermaine Fowler, Kiersey Clemons, Molly Gordon, Whitmer Thomas, Odessa A'zion, Sean Hayes, and Notaro. The film's screenplay is loosely based on screenwriter Pomerantz's personal life and her friendship with Jessica Elbaum, who also serves as producer.

The film had its world premiere at the Sundance Film Festival on January 24, 2022, and premiered on Max on June 6, 2024.

== Plot ==
Lucy is a 32-year-old woman living in Los Angeles with her best friend Jane and working as a receptionist at a spa. She finds little satisfaction in her romantic life, including with her friend Ben, who becomes frustrated at her continued avoidance of his advances. Jane receives a work promotion that will require her to relocate to London, and goes out for drinks with Lucy and Jane's boyfriend Danny to celebrate. After Jane confesses to kissing a female friend as a teenager, Lucy drunkenly tells her that she thinks she might be a lesbian. Jane encourages her to explore her feelings, suggesting that Lucy should pursue her flirtatious massage therapist co-worker Brittany.

Lucy invites Brittany to her house for dinner, but receives mixed signals as Brittany shares about her ex-boyfriend, but also declares her sexuality to be "on the spectrum" and kisses her before leaving. Jane brings Lucy to a lesbian bar, but Lucy is shy and soon leaves after seeing Jane kissing other women on the dance floor; the two fight and stop speaking. Lucy meets up with Brittany again. The two have sex, but Brittany quickly leaves the following morning and becomes distant, later reconciling with her ex-boyfriend. Meanwhile, Jane deals with the pressures of her upcoming move, including her self-absorbed co-worker Kat and Danny's confession that he does not want to join Jane in London as she assumed he would.

Lucy quits her job to return to her passion of painting, and begins meeting other women on dating apps. She comes out to Ben, and the two reconcile as friends. After going on a "hammock retreat" with Kat, Jane makes up with Lucy, excitedly offering support for the changes in her life. Lucy offers to drive Jane to the airport as she heads to London, only to reveal that she will be joining her on the trip to help ease her transition.

== Cast ==
- Dakota Johnson as Lucy
- Sonoya Mizuno as Jane
- Jermaine Fowler as Danny
- Kiersey Clemons as Brittany
- Molly Gordon as Kat
- Whitmer Thomas as Ben
- Odessa A'zion as Sky
- Sean Hayes as Stu
- Tig Notaro as Sheila
- Addison Timlin as Lucy's last date (uncredited)
- Ahmad Harhash as Kit

== Production ==
In October 2019, it was announced Tig Notaro and Stephanie Allynne would direct the film from a screenplay by Lauren Pomerantz, with Jessica Elbaum and Will Ferrell set to produce under their Gloria Sanchez Productions banner. In January 2021, Dakota Johnson, Sonoya Mizuno, Jermaine Fowler, Whitmer Thomas, Molly Gordon, June Diane Raphael, Notaro, and Sean Hayes joined the cast of the film, with Johnson also serving as a producer under her TeaTime Pictures banner.

Principal photography began in February 2021 in Los Angeles. Shortly after production began, it was halted for a week after a crew member tested positive for COVID-19 in the midst of the ongoing pandemic.

== Release ==
The film had its world premiere at the Sundance Film Festival on January 24, 2022. Shortly thereafter, HBO Max and Warner Bros. Pictures acquired worldwide distribution rights to the film for nearly $7 million. It premiered on Max on June 6, 2024.

== Reception ==
On the review aggregator website Rotten Tomatoes, 81% of 93 critics' reviews are positive, with an average rating of 6.9/10. The website's consensus reads: "Anchored in an authentically relatable approach to its story of self-discovery, Am I OK? is further elevated by strong work from Dakota Johnson and Sonoya Mizuno." Metacritic, which uses a weighted average, assigned the film a score of 72 out of 100, based on 17 critics, indicating "generally favorable" reviews.
