= Desperately Seeking Santa =

- Film poster
- Directed by: Craig Pryce
- Starring: Laura Vandervoort; Nick Zano
- Original language: English

Production
- Running time: 86 minutes

Original release
- Network: ABC Family
- Release: November 27, 2011

Desperately Seeking Santa is a television movie starring Laura Vandervoort and Nick Zano. It premiered on ABC Family on November 27, 2011 in their Countdown to 25 Days of Christmas programming block. It is directed by Craig Pryce. It was filmed under the title Hunky Santa.

== Plot ==
Jennifer Walker, PR manager for an aging shopping mall, runs a contest to replace the traditional mall Santa Claus with a "hunky Santa". But complications ensue when she falls in love with contest winner (and struggling restaurateur) David Moretti.

== Cast ==
- Laura Vandervoort as Jennifer Walker
- Nick Zano as David Moretti
- Paula Brancati as Marissa Marlet
- John Bregar as Neal McCormick
- Patrick Garrow as Edgar Hillridge
- Natalie Krill as Brittany
- Gerry Mendicino as Mr. Moretti
- Katie Griffin as Sonia Moretti
- Lisa Berry as Christine Mayweather
