= No Good Deed (TV series) =

American black comedy television series

- Genre: Black comedy
- Created by: Liz Feldman
- Showrunner: Liz Feldman
- Starring: Lisa Kudrow; Ray Romano; Linda Cardellini; Luke Wilson; O-T Fagbenle; Abbi Jacobson; Denis Leary; Poppy Liu; Teyonah Parris
- Music by: Siddhartha Khosla
- Country of origin: United States
- Original language: English
- No. of seasons: 1
- No. of episodes: 8

Production
- Executive producers: Liz Feldman; Silver Tree; Christie Smith; Jessica Elbaum; Will Ferrell
- Producer: Carrie A. Tyson
- Cinematography: Cort Fey
- Editors: Nicole Brik; Pamela March; Micah Gardner; Gena Fridman
- Running time: 30–39 minutes
- Production companies: Visualized, Inc.; Gloria Sanchez Productions; Rise Productions

Original release
- Network: Netflix
- Release: December 12, 2024

No Good Deed is an American black comedy television series created by Liz Feldman for Netflix, starring Lisa Kudrow, Ray Romano, Linda Cardellini, and Luke Wilson. It follows three families vying to buy the same house, which they all think will solve their problems. The series was released on Netflix on December 12, 2024. In July 2025, it was placed on an indefinite hiatus.

== Cast and characters ==
=== Main ===
- Lisa Kudrow as Lydia Morgan, Paul's wife, co-owner of the house, a former concert pianist
- Ray Romano as Paul Morgan, Lydia's husband, co-owner of the house and a contractor
- Linda Cardellini as Margo Starling, the Morgans' neighbor and JD's wife
- Luke Wilson as JD Campbell, Margo's husband and an out-of-work soap opera star
- O-T Fagbenle as Dennis Sampson, Carla's husband who is an author
- Abbi Jacobson as Leslie Fisher, Sarah's wife who is a prosecutor for the DA
- Denis Leary as Mikey Morgan, Paul's estranged older brother, a career criminal recently released from prison
- Poppy Liu as Sarah Webber, Leslie's wife who is a doctor
- Teyonah Parris as Carla Owens, Dennis's pregnant wife who is an architect

=== Recurring ===
- Matt Rogers as Greg Boycelane, the Morgans' realtor
- Katherine Moennig as Gwen Delvecchio, a real estate developer and Margo's lover
- Anna Maria Horsford as Denise Sampson, Dennis' mother
- Linda Lavin as Phyllis Adelman, the Morgans' annoying neighbor
- Kevin Alves as Nate Morgan, Mikey's son who is a police officer
- Chloe East as Emily Morgan, Lydia and Paul's daughter
- Wyatt Aubrey as Jacob Morgan, Lydia and Paul's deceased son

== Episodes ==
No.	Title	Directed by	Written by	Original release date
1	"Open House"	Silver Tree	Liz Feldman	December 12, 2024
2	"Private Showing"	Silver Tree	Cara DiPaolo & Madie Dhaliwal	December 12, 2024
3	"Letters of Intent"	Silver Tree	Crystal Jenkins	December 12, 2024
4	"Foundation Issues"	Liz Feldman	Kelly Hutchinson	December 12, 2024
5	"Off the Market"	Liz Feldman	Cara DiPaolo	December 12, 2024
6	"Full Disclosure"	Silver Tree	Bruce Eric Kaplan	December 12, 2024
7	"Best and Final"	Silver Tree	Zora Bikangaga	December 12, 2024
8	"Sold"	Silver Tree	Liz Feldman & Kelly Hutchinson	December 12, 2024

== Production ==
=== Development ===
In May 2022, it was announced Liz Feldman would create, showrun, and executive produce the series, with Will Ferrell and Jessica Elbaum as co-executive producers under their Gloria Sanchez Productions banner, and Silver Tree attached to executive produce and direct the pilot among other episodes. In July 2025, it was reported the series was not renewed for a second season and was placed on an indefinite hiatus. Deadline Hollywood reported that if the series does return, it would feature a new cast.

=== Casting ===
In December 2023, Lisa Kudrow, Ray Romano, Linda Cardellini, Luke Wilson, Abbi Jacobson, Poppy Liu, and Teyonah Parris joined the cast. In January 2024, Denis Leary and O-T Fagbenle joined the cast. In February 2024, Matt Rogers, Anna Marie Horsford, Kate Moennig, Linda Lavin and Wyatt Aubrey joined the cast in recurring roles. In April 2024, Kevin Alves joined the cast in a recurring role.

=== Filming ===
Principal photography began by February 2024.

== Release ==
The series was released on Netflix on December 12, 2024.

== Reception ==
On the review aggregator website Rotten Tomatoes reported an 80% approval rating with an average rating of 6.5/10, based on 41 critic reviews. The website's critics consensus reads, "No Good Deed's many twists and turns can occasionally feel like a punishment, but an ace cast and rock-solid hook give this comedy a sturdy foundation." Metacritic, which uses a weighted average, assigned a score of 63 out of 100 based on 23 critics, indicating "generally favorable" reviews.
