= Quiz Lady =

2023 film by Jessica Yu

- Release poster
- Directed by: Jessica Yu
- Written by: Jen D'Angelo
- Produced by: Will Ferrell; Jessica Elbaum; Maggie Haskins; Itay Reiss; Jen D'Angelo; Awkwafina; Sandra Oh
- Starring: Awkwafina; Sandra Oh; Paul Reubens; Jason Schwartzman; Holland Taylor; Tony Hale; Jon "Dumbfoundead" Park; Will Ferrell
- Cinematography: Adrian Peng Correia
- Edited by: Nat Sanders; Susan Vaill
- Music by: Nick Urata
- Production company: Gloria Sanchez Productions
- Distributed by: 20th Century Studios; Hulu
- Release dates: September 9, 2023 (TIFF); November 3, 2023 (United States)
- Running time: 99 minutes
- Country: United States
- Language: English
- Budget: $23.8 million

Quiz Lady is a 2023 American comedy film directed by Jessica Yu and written by Jen D'Angelo. The film stars Awkwafina, Sandra Oh, Jason Schwartzman, Holland Taylor, Tony Hale, Jon "Dumbfoundead" Park, and Will Ferrell. Ferrell, Awkwafina, and Oh also served as the film's producers, along with Jessica Elbaum, Maggie Haskins, Itay Reiss, and D'Angelo.

Quiz Lady premiered at the Toronto International Film Festival on September 9, 2023, and was released by 20th Century Studios via Hulu in the United States on November 3, 2023, to positive reviews. It earned the Primetime Emmy Award for Outstanding Television Movie.

== Plot ==
As a child growing up in Greater Pittsburgh, Anne Yum finds comfort in the TV game show Can't Stop the Quiz to escape her stressful family; her father leaves them, her mother is a gambling addict, and her older sister Jenny abandons Anne and their dog, Mr. Linguini, to pursue dreams of fame. Years later, a tightly wound Anne lives alone with Mr. Linguini and feels invisible at work but still watches Can't Stop the Quiz every night.

Learning that her mother has escaped her nursing home and fled to Macau, Anne reunites with the reckless, chaotic Jenny. Unemployed and living in her car, Jenny comes to stay with Anne and claims to have won a lucrative lawsuit against a restaurant chain after choking on a fish bone. While watching Can't Stop the Quiz, Jenny secretly records Anne answering every question at remarkable speed, and the video goes viral, much to Anne's horror. She is tracked down by Ken, a loan shark who has kidnapped Mr. Linguini and demands that Anne pay off her mother's $80,000 debt.

Jenny encourages Anne — whose video gained the attention of the Can't Stop the Quiz casting directors — to go on the show and win enough money to get Mr. Linguini back. Anne refuses, but Jenny kidnaps her and drives her to Philadelphia to audition for the show, admitting on the way that she lied about winning the lawsuit. Jenny dislocates her wrist at a bar. Waiting at the hospital, they reminisce about the childhood summer they spent with their cousins in Burbank, who didn't like them and never invited them back. Anne reveals that she felt too uncomfortable and unwelcome to use the cousins' bathroom, leading her to defecate in a hole in the backyard.

At the audition, Jenny calms a nervous Anne with drugs that are soon revealed to be hallucinogens. After taking a different drug to counteract the others, Anne does well, impressing the crowd and the producers. Jenny reveals that she lied about lying about the lawsuit, and really does have a large settlement coming; this was all part of her plan to become a self-described life coach, knowing Anne would not have tried out for the show otherwise. An angry Anne lashes out at Jenny, who reveals that their cousins discovered the hole in the backyard, but Jenny willingly took the blame.

Anne returns home and bonds with her cantankerous neighbor Francine, who urges her not to worry about getting people to like her. Invited to compete on Can't Stop the Quiz, Anne finally stands up to her obnoxious coworkers and decides to go on the show with Francine as her partner. Meanwhile, Jenny tries to negotiate with Ken, discovering that he and his gang are running a struggling animal shelter, and she steals Mr. Linguini back.

Traveling to Los Angeles with Francine to film the show, Anne meets her idol, host Terry McTeer, and maintains her disdain for Ron, the show's obsequious long-running champion. Anne is too used to answering questions at home with her dog at her side and finishes the first round in a distant second place to Ron. Jenny arrives with Mr. Linguini, and the sisters reconcile as she convinces Anne to finish the game. She also forces the producers to let Mr. Linguini join Anne, who catches up to Ron in the second round.

During a commercial break, an anxious Anne is comforted by Terry. When the third round is chosen to be a game of charades, Anne switches partners to play with Jenny instead, and they share a heartfelt moment on the winning word, as Anne admits that Jenny is her hero. Anne wins, while Ron has an on-camera meltdown until he is told off by Terry. The sisters arrange for Francine to meet Paul Reubens, her celebrity crush, whom she thinks is Alan Cumming.

Anne goes on to win a record-breaking 93 consecutive games and is hired as a writer on the show. Jenny receives her obscenely large check from the lawsuit, paying off their mother's debt and buying a Malibu mansion where Anne, Jenny, and Mr. Linguini live together.

== Cast ==
- Awkwafina as Anne Yum, Jenny's younger sister who likes the TV game show Can't Stop the Quiz
- Sandra Oh as Jennifer "Jenny" Yum, Anne's older sister who leaves her to pursue her dreams of fame
- Will Ferrell as Terry McTeer, the host of Can't Stop the Quiz
- Holland Taylor as Francine, Anne's neighbour
- Jason Schwartzman as Ron Heacock
- Tawny Newsome as Mercedes
- Paul Reubens as Francine's crush
- Jon "Dumbfoundead" Park as Ken
- Camrus Johnson as Trav
- Angela Trimbur as Marge
- Tony Hale as Ben Franklin
- Matt Cordova as Bart
- Alan Heitz as Glenn
- Amy Tolsky as Leah
- Joe Chrest as Mr. Walters
- Crosby Cookie as "Mr. Linguini"
- Phil LaMarr as The Brain
- Luke Kim as Cousin Jin

== Production ==
In October 2020, it was announced that an untitled comedy film was in development at Netflix, with Jen D'Angelo writing the screenplay, and Sandra Oh and Awkwafina starring. D'Angelo derived the game show idea from her brother's experiences trying to appear on Jeopardy!; In May 2026, her brother Chris became a Jeopardy! contestant and multi-game champion.

In December 2021, Netflix reportedly left the film, and the rights were acquired by 20th Century Studios. Jessica Yu was also set to direct. Will Ferrell and Jessica Elbaum were to produce the film under their Gloria Sanchez Productions banner with Artists First; Alex Brown served as an executive producer. Sarah Shepard oversaw the film for 20th Century.

Principal photography began on June 7, 2022, and was expected to last until July 22 of that year, with filming taking place in Los Angeles and New Orleans. By the beginning of production, Holland Taylor, Jason Schwartzman, Tony Hale, and Ferrell were revealed to star in the film. On September 9, 2023, it was revealed that actor Paul Reubens (who died on July 30, 2023) would posthumously appear as himself in a cameo.

== Release ==
In June 2022, the film was reported to be scheduled for release by 20th Century Studios as a Hulu original film in the United States, It premiered on Star+ in Latin America and Disney+ in other territories the same day. In July 2023, the film's title was revealed to be Quiz Lady, with a release date of November 3, 2023. The film premiered at the Toronto International Film Festival on September 9, 2023.

== Reception ==
=== Audience viewership ===
According to Whip Media's viewership tracking app TV Time, which tracks viewership data for the more than 25 million worldwide users of its app, Quiz Lady was the fourth-most streamed movie in the U.S. during the week of November 3, and the fifth during the week of November 13, 2023.

=== Critical response ===
On the review aggregator website Rotten Tomatoes, 83% of 92 critics' reviews are positive, with an average rating of 6.4/10. The website's consensus reads: "Quiz Lady's perfectly matched leads help Jessica Yu's occasionally uneven comedy overcome its periodic wobbles and land on the right side of hilarious and heartfelt." Metacritic, which uses a weighted average, assigned the film a score of 59 out of 100, based on 12 critics, indicating "mixed or average" reviews.

=== Accolades ===
The film received the Primetime Emmy Award for Outstanding Television Movie, marking Oh's 14th Emmy nomination and her first win.

Year	Award	Category	Nominee(s)	Result	Ref.
2024	Astra TV Awards	Best TV Movie	Quiz Lady	Nominated	
2024	Astra TV Awards	Best Actress in a Limited Series or TV Movie	Awkwafina	Nominated	
2024	Astra TV Awards	Best Actress in a Limited Series or TV Movie	Sandra Oh	Nominated	
2024	Astra TV Awards	Best Supporting Actor in a Limited Series or TV Movie	Jason Schwartzman	Nominated	
2024	Astra TV Awards	Best Directing in a Limited Series or TV Movie	Jessica Yu	Nominated	
2024	Astra TV Awards	Best Writing in a Limited Series or TV Movie	Jen D'Angelo	Nominated	
2024	Critics' Choice Television Awards	Best Movie Made for Television	Quiz Lady	Won	
2024	NAMIC Vision Awards	Original Movie or Special	Quiz Lady	Nominated	
2024	Primetime Emmy Awards	Outstanding Television Movie	Alex Brown, Erika Hampson, Will Ferrell, Jessica Elbaum, Maggie Haskins, Itay Reiss, Jen D'Angelo, Awkwafina, and Sandra Oh	Won	
2024	Producers Guild of America Awards	Outstanding Producer of Streamed or Televised Motion Pictures	Quiz Lady	Nominated	
2024	The ReFrame Stamp	Feature	Quiz Lady	Won	
2024	Writers Guild of America Awards	TV & New Media Motion Pictures	Jen D'Angelo	Won	
2025	Artios Awards	Outstanding Achievement in Casting – Film, First Released for Television or Streaming	Nicole Abellera Hallman, Jeanne McCarthy, Erica Johnson, Ryan Glorioso, Justin Coulter	Nominated	
