= Gloria Sanchez Productions =

American film production company

Gloria Sanchez Productions, Inc.
- Type: Private
- Industry: Film; Television
- Predecessor: Gary Sanchez Productions
- Founded: February 2014; 12 years ago
- Founders: Jessica Elbaum; Will Ferrell; Adam McKay
- Headquarters: United States
- Key people: Jessica Elbaum (Partner); Will Ferrell (Partner)
- Services: Film production; Television production
- Owners: Jessica Elbaum; Will Ferrell
- Website: www.instagram.com/gloriasanchezprods

Gloria Sanchez Productions, Inc. is an American film and television production company.

== History ==
In 2014, Jessica Elbaum founded the production company as a sister label of Gary Sanchez Productions, founded by Will Ferrell and Adam McKay, with a focus on female voices in comedy. Elbaum has worked with Ferrell since the founding of Gary Sanchez Productions as an executive producer and pitched the idea to create a female-focused production company. The logo is the same as its male counterpart, but a woman's hand pours the coffee, and a calico cat lies on the table.

In January 2020, the company was reorganized following the dissolution of Gary Sanchez Productions, and became Ferrell's primary production company while still maintaining a focus on female-centered stories. It entered a multi-year non-exclusive first-look television deal with Netflix, and also entered a feature multi-year deal with Paramount Pictures. In 2021, it was moved to 20th Century Studios.

== Filmography ==
=== Film ===
Year	Title	Director	Gross (worldwide)	Notes	Ref.
2015	Sleeping with Other People	Leslye Headland	$3.2 million	with Sidney Kimmel Entertainment; distributed by IFC Films	
2017	Oh Lucy!	Atsuko Hirayanagi	$373,293	with Matchgirl Pictures, Meridian Content, and NHK; distributed by Film Movement	
2019	Booksmart	Olivia Wilde	$25 million	with Annapurna Pictures; distributed by United Artists Releasing	
2019	Hustlers	Lorene Scafaria	$157.6 million	with Nuyorican Productions and Annapurna Pictures; distributed by STXfilms	
2020	Eurovision Song Contest: The Story of Fire Saga	David Dobkin	—N/a	with Gary Sanchez Productions and European Broadcasting Union; distributed by Netflix	
2021	Barb and Star Go to Vista Del Mar	Josh Greenbaum	$32,825	with Stellie Productions and Lionsgate Films; distributed by Lionsgate Films	
2022	Am I OK?	Tig Notaro and Stephanie Allynne	—N/a	with Picturestart, TeaTime Pictures, and Something Fierce Productions; distributed by Warner Bros. Pictures and Max	
2022	Spirited	Sean Anders	—N/a	with Apple Original Films, Maximum Effort, and Two Grown Men; distributed by Apple TV+	
2023	Theater Camp	Molly Gordon and Nick Lieberman	$4.6 million	with Picturestart and Topic Studios; distributed by Searchlight Pictures	
2023	May December	Todd Haynes	$5.3 million	with Killer Films and MountainA; distributed by Netflix	
2023	Quiz Lady	Jessica Yu	—N/a	with Artists First and 20th Century Studios; distributed by Hulu	
2024	Will & Harper	Josh Greenbaum	—N/a	with Delirio Films and Wayfarer Studios; distributed by Netflix	
2025	You're Cordially Invited	Nicholas Stoller	—N/a	with Hello Sunshine, Stoller Global Solutions, and Amazon MGM Studios; distributed by Amazon Prime Video	

==== In production ====
- Judgment Day (with Stoller Global Solutions and Amazon MGM Studios)
- The Fifth Wheel (with Hyphenate Media Group)

==== In development ====
- Dropz (with Paramount Animation)
- Cult of Love
- Playdate
- Self Help
- Tough Guys (with Open Invite Entertainment, Underground Films, and Amazon MGM Studios)
- Untitled Amelia Dimoldenberg romantic comedy (with Dimz Inc and Orion Pictures)
- Street Justice (with 20th Century Studios)
- Untitled Sarah Haskins and Emily Halpern film (with 20th Century Studios)

=== Television ===
Year	Title	Network	Notes	Ref.
2017–2019	I'm Sorry	truTV	with Pamplemousse Productions, Kablamo! Productions (season 1), Lonely Island Classics, and A24 (season 2)	
2019–2022	Dead to Me	Netflix	with Visualized, Inc. and CBS Television Studios	
2021	The Shrink Next Door	Apple TV+	with Buckaroo, Small Mammal Productions, Semi-Formal Productions, Bloomberg Media, MRC Television, Civic Center Media, and Wondery	
2022	The Woman in the House Across the Street from the Girl in the Window	Netflix	with Hugh Rachel Larry	
2024	No Good Deed	Netflix	with Visualized, Inc. and Rise Productions	
2026	The Hawk	Netflix	with Rough House Pictures, Guest Spot, T-Street Productions and PGA Tour Studios	

==== In development ====
- Dream State (with A24)
- Untitled Totally Spies! live action series (with Banijay Kids & Family and Amazon MGM Studios)
