= Dead to Me (TV series) =

American dark comedy television series

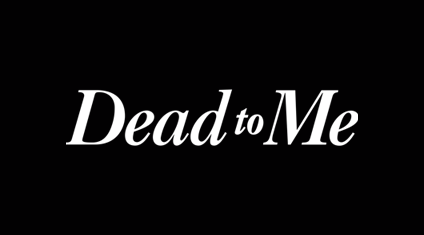
- Genre: Crime drama; Black comedy; Tragicomedy; Thriller
- Created by: Liz Feldman
- Starring: Christina Applegate; Linda Cardellini; James Marsden; Max Jenkins; Sam McCarthy; Luke Roessler
- Composer: Adam Blau
- Country of origin: United States
- Original language: English
- No. of seasons: 3
- No. of episodes: 30

Production
- Executive producers: Liz Feldman; Will Ferrell; Adam McKay; Jessica Elbaum; Christina Applegate; Christie Smith; Joe Hardesty
- Producers: Joe Hardesty; Linda Cardellini; Peter Chomsky; Buddy Enright; Denise Pleune; Carrie A. Tyson; Emma Rathbone; Kelly Hutchinson
- Cinematography: Danny Moder; Toby Oliver; Anthony Hardwick; Bradford Lipson; Edward Pei
- Editors: Liza Cardinale; Grady Cooper; Iris Hershner; Nicole Brik; Pamela March; Amber Bansak; Joseph Ettinger
- Camera setup: Single-camera
- Running time: 26–39 minutes
- Production companies: Gloria Sanchez Productions; Visualized, Inc.; CBS Studios

Original release
- Network: Netflix
- Release: May 3, 2019 – November 17, 2022

Dead to Me is an American black comedy-crime thriller television series that stars Christina Applegate and Linda Cardellini as two grieving women who bond during therapy. It was created by Liz Feldman and executive produced by Feldman, Will Ferrell, Adam McKay, and Jessica Elbaum. The series premiered on May 3, 2019, on Netflix and received positive reviews. In June 2019, Netflix renewed the series for a second season which was released on May 8, 2020. At the 71st Primetime Emmy Awards, Applegate received a nomination for Outstanding Lead Actress in a Comedy Series.

In July 2020, the series was renewed for a third and final season. Due to the COVID-19 pandemic, production of the third season was delayed until mid-2021, and was then further delayed by Applegate's multiple sclerosis diagnosis. The third and final season was released on November 17, 2022. At the 72nd Primetime Emmy Awards, the show received four nominations including Primetime Emmy Award for Outstanding Comedy Series and two Primetime Emmy Award for Outstanding Lead Actress in a Comedy Series for Applegate and Cardellini. At the 75th Primetime Emmy Awards, Applegate received her third Outstanding Lead Actress nomination on the series for its final season.

== Premise ==
Dead to Me is about a friendship that blossoms between Jen (Applegate) and Judy (Cardellini). Jen is a recently widowed real estate agent based in Laguna Beach, California, trying to come to terms with her loss through therapy, exercise, and other methods. She uses anger and resentment as an outlet for her grief. She meets Judy in a grief support group. Jen mourns her husband, who was killed by a hit-and-run driver, while Judy claims that she is grieving for her fiancé who died of a heart attack. In actuality, Judy is the hit-and-run driver, and her fiancé simply broke up with her. The two characters face their struggles differently, as Jen finds herself in a dark place while Judy maintains a positive disposition. This difference quickly leads to a deep bond between the two. Jen becomes more unhinged as she unravels the mystery of her husband's death and Judy's secrets.

== Cast and characters ==
=== Main ===
- Christina Applegate as Jen Harding, a realtor whose husband Ted was killed by a hit-and-run driver shortly before the start of the series
- Linda Cardellini as Judy Hale, a woman Jen meets at a grief support group who befriends her.
- James Marsden as
  - Steve Wood (season 1), Judy's emotionally abusive ex-fiancé, an attorney involved with the Greek Mafia
  - Ben Wood (seasons 2–3), Steve's semi-identical twin brother, a chiropractor, and Jen's new love interest
- Max Jenkins as Christopher Doyle (seasons 1–2, recurring season 3), Jen's real estate business partner and friend
- Sam McCarthy as Charlie Harding, Jen's older son
- Luke Roessler as Henry Harding, Jen's younger son

=== Recurring ===
- Diana-Maria Riva as Ana Perez, the police detective in charge of the hit-and-run case
- Brandon Scott as Nick Prager, a police detective on administrative leave whom Judy meets at the grieving retreat
- Valerie Mahaffey as Lorna Harding, Jen's mother-in-law and Ted's mother
- Natalie Morales as Michelle (seasons 2–3), Judy's love interest and Ana's ex-girlfriend
- Ed Asner as Abe Rifkin (season 1), Judy's friend from the retirement home where she works
- Keong Sim as Pastor Wayne, Jen and Judy's grief support group leader
- Telma Hopkins as Yolanda, a member of the grief support group
- Sadie Stanley as Parker (season 2), Charlie's brief love interest and self-proclaimed social media micro-influencer
- Haley Sims as Kayley, Steve's assistant
- Blair Beeken as Wendy, a member of the grief support group
- Edward Fordham Jr. as Kyle, a member of the grief support group
- Frances Conroy as Eileen Wood (seasons 2–3), Steve and Ben's mother
- Suzy Nakamura as Karen, Jen's neighbor, who is obsessed with protecting her house and preparing for the apocalypse.
- Jere Burns as Howard Hastings (season 2), a corrupt police chief who is working with the Greek Mafia
- Garret Dillahunt as Glenn Moranis (season 3), an FBI agent who is investigating Steve's death and ties to the Greek Mafia

=== Guest ===
- Olivia Macklin as Bambi (season 1), a waitress and Ted's mistress
- Steve Howey as Jason (season 1), a widower Jen meets at a grief retreat
- Tara Karsian as Erica Brewer (season 1), Charlie's principal
- Lily Knight as Linda, a member of the grief support group
- Tom Virtue as Doug (season 1), a potential client of Jen's
- Beth Littleford as Doug's wife (season 1)
- Adora Soleil Bricher as Shandy Adams, a girl in Henry's class who finds Ted's body
- Chelsea Spack as Heidi (seasons 1-2), Steve's new girlfriend, and employee at TKG Arts
- Rick Holmes as Andrew Peters (seasons 1-2), a man Jen suspects of killing her husband
- Marc Evan Jackson as Jeff (seasons 2–3), Karen's husband who is gay and having an affair
- Katey Sagal as Eleanor Hale (seasons 2–3), Judy's drug-addicted and emotionally abusive mother
- Nicolas Coster as Jim Wood (season 3), Steve and Ben's father

== Episodes ==
Overview of Dead to Me seasons
Season	Episodes	Originally released
1	10	May 3, 2019
2	10	May 8, 2020
3	10	November 17, 2022

=== Season 1 (2019) ===
Dead to Me, season 1 episodes
No. overall	No. in season	Title	Directed by	Written by	Original release date
1	1	"Pilot"	Amy York Rubin	Liz Feldman	May 3, 2019
Jen, a real estate agent prone to violent emotional outbursts, is mourning the death of her husband Ted, who has recently been killed by a hit-and-run driver. She joins a grief support group, where she meets Judy, who is mourning the death of her fiancé Steve, and the two become close friends. One of the ways that Jen processes her grief is to investigate any car she sees that looks like it may have been involved in a hit-and-run. Jen discovers that Steve is alive, and Judy lied about his death; when she confronts Judy at the support group, Judy apologizes and explains that her grief is actually for her miscarriages, which she blames for the failure of her relationship with Steve. Jen and Judy reconcile. At the end of the episode, Judy visits her storage unit, in which there is a car, a vintage Mustang, with damage consistent with a hit-and-run.
2	2	"Maybe I'm Crazy"	Amy York Rubin	Liz Feldman	May 3, 2019
Jen is working with Steve to sell his house, while Judy begins stalking Steve. He learns that Judy has moved into Jen's guest house, and warns Jen that chaos tends to follow Judy; soon, he files a restraining order against Judy. Jen gets into a shouting match with the driver of a Corvette who is driving unsafely in the neighborhood. Judy has flashbacks to hitting someone with her car, and it is revealed that Steve was riding with her. While on a drive with Judy, Jen spots the Corvette and smashes it with a golf club.
3	3	"It's All My Fault"	Abe Sylvia	Anthony King	May 3, 2019
Jen deals with Ted's upcoming birthday memorial, where she clashes with Ted's narcissistic mother Lorna. Judy reveals to Steve that Jen is married to the person they killed, and Steve pressures Judy to keep quiet about what happened. Judy's feelings of guilt increase, and a flashback reveals that Judy was at Ted's funeral, watching from afar. Ana Perez, the lead detective on Ted's case, arrives during the memorial to question Jen about the vandalized Corvette, and Judy confesses to the crime to protect Jen and punish herself. Steve bails Judy out of jail and reminds her not to confess to killing Ted, manipulating her feelings by seducing her. Jen logs onto Ted's laptop to play an online game with Charlie (which Charlie has told her he used to play with Ted), and starts receiving explicit messages from "bambi88", revealing Ted had been having an affair.
4	4	"I Can't Go Back"	Abe Sylvia	Kate Robin	May 3, 2019
The next morning, Steve tries to convince Judy to move back in with him. Judy and Jen track down "bambi88", a waitress whose name is actually Bambi. At her restaurant, Jen angrily lashes out at Bambi when she finds out she and Ted had been seeing each other for a year and a half, and storms out; Judy, pretending to be Ted's wife, confronts Bambi with the news that Ted is dead. Bambi is upset and reveals that Ted had told her that his wife had died of breast cancer (the same disease that killed Jen's mother years before). When she finds this out, Jen says she's glad Ted is dead. Jen confronts Steve and informs him Judy will not move back in with him. A flashback shows that Judy wanted to go back and help Ted after the accident, but Steve stopped her.
5	5	"I've Gotta Get Away"	Minkie Spiro	Abe Sylvia	May 3, 2019
Jen and Judy attend a "grief retreat" in Palm Springs, but Jen mostly treats it as a vacation. Jen drinks and flirts with Jason, a recent widower; they go to bed together, but he is still not over his wife and it goes badly. Meanwhile, Judy meets Nick, a police detective on administrative leave after his best friend was killed in the line of duty. Judy introduces him to Jen, who asks if he has ever solved a hit-and run.
6	6	"Oh My God"	Minkie Spiro	Njeri Brown	May 3, 2019
Nick meets Jen and Judy at the location where Ted was killed, and offers to talk to Perez about the case. Judy learns that Ted's body was found by a 9-year-old girl in Henry's class, Shandy. Jen is called to Charlie's school, where the principal informs her that he has been dealing drugs which he stole from Ted's medicine cabinet. Henry has also been acting out at school, yelling at his classmates when they sing the wrong note at a school recital. Jen arranges for Nick, whom Judy is now dating, to come to the house and scare Charlie straight, but Nick unexpectedly finds a gun in Charlie's backpack. Shandy gives Jen a piece of the car she had found at the scene of Ted's death. Judy returns to the storage locker, intending to inspect the car, only to find that it is already gone.
7	7	"I Can Handle It"	Kat Coiro	Emma Rathbone	May 3, 2019
Jen brings the car part to Perez. Judy demands Steve tell her what happened to the car, and he takes her to a garage where he is in the process of dismantling it, intending to dispose of the parts in Mexico. They work together to tear the car apart, and begin reminiscing about their relationship, which ends with them having sex. The police identify the part of the car as belonging to a 1966 Mustang.
8	8	"Try to Stop Me"	Kat Coiro	Kelly Hutchinson	May 3, 2019
Jen, Judy, and Nick begin visiting the homes of registered owners of 1966 Mustangs, causing Judy to panic. Suspecting she may be pregnant, Judy breaks up with Nick and returns to Steve, only for him to tell her to "save herself the grief" of another miscarriage; she then discovers that he is in a new relationship. Judy leaves without telling him that the police have identified the make and model of the car involved in the hit-and-run. Later, Judy's doctor confirms that she is not pregnant and may be experiencing early menopause. Nick discovers that one of the businesses on the list of Mustang owners, TKG Arts, is owned by Steve and is displaying Judy's paintings.
9	9	"I Have to Be Honest"	Geeta Patel	Rebecca Addelman	May 3, 2019
Nick visits the TKG Arts gallery and asks Steve about the car, but Steve denies knowing anything about it. Money problems force Jen to ask Lorna for a job. Perez rebuffs Nick's theories; later, Judy, angry over Steve's reaction to her possible pregnancy, turns Steve in for money laundering. Jen tells Judy that she and Ted had a fight the night of the hit-and-run, and that she now blames herself for his death. Judy finally confesses to killing Ted, and Jen angrily tells her to die. While collecting evidence from Steve's storage locker, Perez notices a motor oil spill.
10	10	"You Have to Go"	Geeta Patel	Liz Feldman & Abe Sylvia	May 3, 2019
Jen cleans out the guesthouse and burns all of Judy's possessions; she also installs a security system at the house and has begun carrying Ted's gun. She visits Perez and tells her of Judy's confession, but Perez refuses to arrest Judy, as it would interfere with their investigation of Steve. Judy surprises Jen at a house showing, hoping to make amends, but Jen warns her never to contact her again. Judy empties her and Steve's joint bank account and hides the money (in the form of a cashier's check) in a small wooden bird. Steve, under pressure from the Greek Mafia now that his money laundering scheme has been discovered, comes to Jen's house looking for Judy. He learns that Judy confessed to Jen, and he admits to being in the car as well. They argue and Jen draws her gun, ordering him to leave. Judy returns to the place where Ted was killed and unsuccessfully attempts to take her own life by stepping in front of an oncoming car; she then receives a call from Jen telling her she needs to come over immediately. Judy returns to the house and finds Jen standing over Steve's lifeless body floating in the pool.

=== Season 2 (2020) ===
Dead to Me, season 2 episodes
No. overall	No. in season	Title	Directed by	Written by	Original release date
11	1	"You Know What You Did"	Liza Johnson	Liz Feldman	May 8, 2020
Jen and Judy briefly reunite to cover up Steve's death; Jen learns that her neighbor Karen's security camera caught footage of Steve arriving at her house. She is still upset about Judy's lies and, after they hide Steve's body, kicks her out again, leaving her homeless. They later reconcile, but Jen lies to Judy about the circumstances of Steve's death: she claims she shot him in self-defense, but flashbacks show she bludgeoned him to death with Henry's wooden bird as he was leaving. At the end of the episode, the doorbell rings to reveal what appears to be Steve, alive and well.
12	2	"Where Have You Been"	Liza Johnson	Elizabeth Benjamin	May 8, 2020
Judy recognizes the man at the door as Steve's twin brother, Ben, who is asking about his brother's whereabouts. Judy tells him that Steve ran off to Mexico to avoid prosecution for money laundering. Detective Perez arrives at the house to give Jen the restraining order she filed against Judy, only to be nonplussed when Jen asks her to rescind it. Perez warns Jen that Judy is a "rip tide" and to stay away from her.
13	3	"You Can't Live Like This"	Tamra Davis	Cara DiPaolo	May 8, 2020
Jen and Judy have placed Steve's corpse in the freezer in Jen's garage, and argue over what to do with it after discovering rats are trying to chew their way in. Judy wants to dispose of the body in a respectful way, while Jen immediately jumps to dissolving it with industrial-strength drain cleaner. The two ultimately decide to bury the body in the Angeles National Forest in the middle of the night.
14	4	"Between You and Me"	Tamra Davis	Jessi Klein	May 8, 2020
After disposing of Steve's body, Jen and Judy book into a lavish hotel on the weekend of a wedding. There, the two spot Karen's husband, Jeff, having an affair with another man. Judy is having trouble emotionally processing Steve's death, so Jen gives them the opportunity to open up emotionally, and for Judy to mourn Steve properly. Upon returning home, Jen and Judy learn that the bird Henry believed to be his reincarnated father is dead. At the storage unit, Charlie discovers Steve's car and believes it is a birthday present from Jen.
15	5	"The Price You Pay"	Liz Allen Rosenbaum	Kelly Hutchinson	May 8, 2020
Charlie takes Steve's car on a joyride with his girlfriend Parker; they are recorded on multiple traffic cameras, and Parker posts pictures of their day to social media, including one in which she is wearing Steve's TKG Arts baseball cap. After Jen tells her she needs more "space" in their relationship, Judy bonds with a new client's daughter, Michelle. Ben, a chiropractor, helps Jen relieve the back pain she is enduring after burying Steve; Jen has flashbacks to the night of the murder, and the horrible things Steve said that sent her into a rage. Jen catches Charlie with Steve's car when it runs out of gas; after sending Charlie and Parker home with Judy, Jen douses the car with gas and sets it on fire.
16	6	"You Don't Have To"	Liz Allen Rosenbaum	Celeste Hughey	May 8, 2020
Jen bribes Parker to take down the pictures of the joyride with Charlie that she posted online, in order to conceal Steve's car. Judy's relationship with Michelle becomes closer and flirtatious, while Jen and Ben hit it off as well. Henry experiences stage fright before his first solo with his Christian choral group, and Jen suggests that they ditch the concert, instead taking the family, along with Ben and Michelle, to an arcade. Nick and other police officers find Steve's burned-out car. Judy and Michelle kiss and spend the night together at Michelle's home; it is revealed to the viewer that Michelle's roommate, and ex-girlfriend, is Detective Perez.
17	7	"If Only You Knew"	Jennifer Getzinger	Dan Dietz	May 8, 2020
Jen and Judy organize a vigil for Steve to deflect suspicion, and Jen pressures Judy to break up with Michelle, due to her proximity to Detective Perez. At the vigil, Judy finds that Steve's fiancée Heidi is four months pregnant. Ben offers a substantial reward for news on Steve's disappearance, and later, Jen and Ben share a kiss. Charlie, who stops by to show his support, recognizes Steve's car in a slideshow of photographs from Steve's life.
18	8	"It Had to Be You"	Jennifer Getzinger	Emma Rathbone	May 8, 2020
While working with Ben and his mother to sell their mansion, Jen and Ben talk about what their kiss meant. Charlie has kept a small case he took from Steve's car, with a flash drive and burner phone inside; when he tries a number on the phone, Chief Hastings answers. Michelle's mother has a stroke, and Judy visits her in the hospital and has an uncomfortable conversation with Detective Perez and Michelle, and Michelle ends her relationship with Judy. Ben visits Jen and confesses he feels a connection with her, and they embrace.
19	9	"It's Not You, It's Me"	Silver Tree	Liz Feldman & Kelly Hutchinson	May 8, 2020
Having slept with Ben, Jen tells him it was a mistake and asks him to leave. Charlie accuses Jen of burning Steve's car, remembering she had a gas can, and Jen tells him to forget about it because Steve was involved with dangerous people. Judy visits her manipulative mother Eleanor in prison, who seeks her help in getting out. Jen then learns from Judy that Nick saw the Instagram photos of Parker and Charlie posing by Steve's car, also stating that there is traffic cam video of the two driving it the day it was burned. Jen and Judy argue, with Jen finally admitting that she killed Steve because he angered her by saying that Ted purposely threw himself in front of their car. When Judy reacts with understanding, Jen furiously tells her that she loves anyone who gives her attention. Upset, Judy tries to leave, but they emotionally reconcile. The next morning, Jen leaves envelopes for Judy, Charlie and Henry, then visits Detective Perez at her home.
20	10	"Where Do We Go from Here"	Silver Tree	Cara DiPaolo & Liz Feldman	May 8, 2020
Jen confesses to Detective Perez that she killed Steve, and the two drive to the makeshift burial site but cannot locate the body. Perez gets a text from Nick stating "We got him" (referring to Chief Hastings), and after bonding about their mothers passing when they were still young, Perez decides not to report Jen. Judy finally gets her paintings back from Perez, and when she is alone, Judy smashes the paintings to uncover thousands of $100 bills that were hidden in them. Ben receives a phone call, and learns that a hiker and her dog have found Steve's body. Judy declines her mother's request to help her get out of jail, while Jen visits the grief support group and realizes she never grieved her own mother's death. Charlie discovers the envelopes that Jen wrote to Judy and the family. Judy and Jen visit Lorna to buy out Jen's mortgage from her, then drive home in a modest new car that Jen wants to give to Charlie. The car is then struck by another vehicle, driven by a drunk Ben; he leaves the scene, while Judy and Jen wake up, injured but alive.

=== Season 3 (2022) ===
Dead to Me, season 3 episodes
No. overall	No. in season	Title	Directed by	Written by	Original release date
21	1	"We've Been Here Before"	Rebecca Asher	Liz Feldman & Emma Rathbone	November 17, 2022
Jen and Judy visit a tropical location, though it is revealed to be a dream after the hit-and-run accident. A bloody, intoxicated Ben arrives at Jen's house only to be greeted by Charlie; Charlie drives Ben to the hospital in Ben's busted up SUV. Jen and Judy are being treated for their injuries at the same hospital as Ben. Judy fakes a seizure, swipes a nurse's identification badge, and steals pain relievers for Jen just as Judy used to fake seizures as a girl so her mom could steal drugs. After Steve's buried body is found, Detective Perez tries to convince Nick that the Greek Mafia is responsible for Steve's death; Nick is skeptical of the story. Detective Perez tries to call Jen, but poor cellphone signals prevent them from speaking. Judy runs into Ben in a hospital corridor where Ben tells Judy that Steve's body has been found. Jen accidentally receives the results of both women's scans and realizes that Judy's scan reveals the possibility that Judy may have cancer.
22	2	"We Need to Talk"	Rebecca Asher	Cara DiPaolo & Celeste Hughey	November 17, 2022
Jen feels pressure to tell Judy about the results of Judy's scan. Charlie, having read Jen's letters, angrily confronts Jen and Judy about Jen's role in Steve's death and how Judy is connected to Ted. Jen and Judy lie about their involvement, and say that Judy had an affair with Ted. Ben shows up at Jen's house with a gift basket for Jen; Ben suffers from an emotional breakdown, feeling guilty due to his role in the hit-and-run incident. Detective Perez and Nick arrive at Jen's house to take her and Judy's statements about the hit-and-run; Jen and Perez have a heated conversation about each person's role in Steve's death and the subsequent coverup. Lorna gives Charlie a brand-new car for his birthday. Jen tells Judy about Judy's scan results indicating a possible cancer diagnosis. Henry gives Ben his wooden bird as a gift to help Ben deal with his grief. An intoxicated Ben leaves the wooden bird at the bar; the bird is discovered by Nick.
23	3	"Look at What We Have Here"	Jenée LaMarque	Harris Danow & Kelly Hutchinson	November 17, 2022
While waiting at the oncology clinic, Judy admits to Jen that she forgot to get a scan after an abnormal pap smear test the year before. Nick returns the wooden bird to Ben, and offers to go with Ben to an AA meeting if he wants help. The FBI has begun an investigation into Steve's murder; Judy visits Glenn Moranis, the FBI agent assigned to the investigation, and implies the Greek mafia was involved. Detective Perez allows Nick to see the photo of the wood found imbedded in Steve’s head. While talking to Perez, Jen admits that the murder weapon was the wooden bird, and that she does not currently have the bird. Jen learns that Steve and Ben's mother, Eileen, is depressed from Steve's death; Jen tries to cheer Eileen up. Ben asks Judy to help him repair the damaged bird as a gift for Henry; Ben then gives the repaired bird back to Jen. Judy has her scan, and the results indicate she has cancer; Judy lies to Jen about the results. Jen and Judy burn the bird and dispose of the ashes. At the end of the episode, Jen sees a car on the street near her house; it is revealed that Moranis is surveilling Jen.
24	4	"Where Do We Go Now?"	Jenée LaMarque	Jessi Klein & Jacqui Rivera	November 17, 2022
Judy visits the oncologist to learn about the recommended course of treatment for her cancer; she struggles to process how difficult her cancer treatment will be. Jen and Judy attend Steve's funeral; Lorna tells Jen and Judy that Eileen decided not to sell the mansion. Eileen convinces Jen to come to her house for a gathering after the funeral. Ben rescues Jen after she accidentally locks herself inside one of the rooms. The two bond over their shared experiences regarding loss, and Jen gives Ben tips on dealing with grief. Judy returns to work and sees Flo, Michelle's mom, back at the nursing home. Judy takes Flo outside for some fresh air; Judy is fired from her job after letting Flo drink a margarita. Michelle and Judy rekindle their relationship, and Judy confesses she has cancer while Michelle appears to be asleep. Ben confesses to Jen that he was the drunk driver who hit Jen and Judy; Jen kisses him, and the two have sex.
25	5	"We Didn't Think This Through"	Rebecca Asher	Cara DiPaolo & Emma Rathbone	November 17, 2022
Charlie discovers Ben in Jen's bedroom. Ben tells Charlie that his drinking is not a true reflection of who he is. Judy encourages Michelle to take up the restaurant offer in Sonoma. A leak is discovered in the ceiling above Jen's kitchen; Jen realizes the leak is a result of her using chemicals to dissolve the rats while disposing of Steve's body. Judy's oncologist informs her that she will have to depend on someone during her chemotherapy treatments. Jen tells Judy about Ben being the hit-and-run driver. Jen and Judy bring Ben to the grief support group. Judy throws a party at Jen's house for group member Yolanda, who is marking the 20th anniversary of her husband's death. Yolanda and Judy share an intimate conversation about relationships and loss. Ben drunkenly shows up at the party and falls into the pool while trying to retrieve a wine bottle; Charlie yells at Ben to get his life together, and orders him to stay away from Jen. Michelle admits that she heard Judy's confession about her cancer. Judy tells Jen about her cancer diagnosis; Jen promises to do anything to help Judy. Ben shows up at the police department and reveals to Nick that he needs help with his drinking problem. Nick finds out from Ben that Judy helped fix the bird.
26	6	"We're Gonna Beat This Thing"	Silver Tree	Jessi Klein & Kelly Hutchinson	November 17, 2022
Judy's chemotherapy treatment begins; Jen is prepared with a multitude of items to help Judy through the grueling treatment regimen. Nick shows Detective Perez an unpainted bird and explains the connection between the bird and Jen and Judy. Nick wants the bird passed on to the FBI agent, and Perez reluctantly agrees to Nick's request. Over the next few weeks, Jen ignores Perez's phone calls, while Judy bonds with Francine, her nurse, while making the thousand paper cranes that Jen agreed to make for Henry's church group. Under Perez's orders, Nick reluctantly reviews hundreds of hours of CCTV footage for the hit-and-run investigation; Nick eventually spots Charlie driving Ben's damaged car. Jen finally meets with Perez and informs her about Judy's cancer. Judy is distraught when Francine suddenly dies. Jen and Judy eat psychedelic mushrooms and trip out, though Charlie is forced to drive Jen to the emergency room when Jen believes she is having a heart attack. Henry tells Judy she is his second mom. At the hospital, an ER doctor tells Jen she is pregnant.
27	7	"Can We Be Honest?"	Rebecca Asher	Harris Danow & Celeste Hughey	November 17, 2022
Jen is reluctant to tell Ben about her pregnancy. Ben, recently released from rehab, tells Jen and Judy that he is leaving Laguna Beach unless there is a reason for him to stay. Judy wants Jen to tell Ben about her love for him, and also believes Jen should tell Ben the truth about Steve's death. Jen confesses to Judy that she is pregnant; Judy struggles with this news. Ben tells Jen that he is the reason her husband is dead; it is revealed in a flashback that Judy and Steve drove a drunk Ben home on the night that Judy hit Ted with her car. Nick theorizes that Charlie hit Jen and Judy. Perez confronts Jen with the photo of Charlie driving Ben's car. Jen tells Perez that Ben was the driver of the car, but Jen doesn't want to press charges because she is pregnant. Nick confronts Perez about her strange behavior and believes she doesn't value him as a police officer. Realizing she needs to do the right thing, Perez arrests Ben for his involvement in the hit-and-run.
28	8	"We'll Find a Way"	Rebecca Asher	Elizabeth Benjamin & Jacqui Rivera	November 17, 2022
Judy visits a natural healer to cover all her bases regarding her cancer treatment. Judy is avoiding having her follow up scan done and is packing for a vacation in Mexico with Jen. Jen visits Perez at the police station, complains about Ben's arrest for hit-and-run, and threatens Perez about Perez's involvement in covering up Jen's role in Steve's death and burial. Perez reveals that the FBI found DNA on Steve's body. Jen and Judy argue over how to deal with this latest complication. Jen is running an open house for Karen and her soon-to-be ex-husband, and Agent Moranis appears in the safe room. Agent Moranis questions Jen about her relationship with Steve. Jen and Judy talk about how to handle Agent Moranis' inquiry. Jen proposes a desperate solution of poisoning Agent Moranis with crushed pain pills in a batch of scones. Jeff, Karen's ex-husband, is pressured by Jen and Judy to be their alibi for the entire Antelope Valley trip. Jen's friend, Christopher, is Jeff's new boyfriend. Jen and Judy manipulate Karen to have her delete the camera footage from the night of Steve's death. Karen shows Jen footage revealing Agent Moranis taking a water bottle of Jen's out of her trash. Judy finally has her scan. Jen goes to Agent Moranis' hotel room.
29	9	"We're Almost Out of Time"	Liz Feldman	Teleplay by : Kelly Hutchinson & Madie Dhaliwal; Story by : Liz Feldman & Cara DiPaolo	November 17, 2022
Jen brings scones to Agent Moranis' hotel and tells Moranis that she was having an affair with Steve in an attempt to explain why her DNA may be found on Steve's body. She also says she is pregnant with Steve's child. In the motel parking lot, Jen sees two men in suits approaching the motel, and it is later revealed that they are hitmen employed by the Greek mafia. Judy discovers that her chemo is not working and that her condition is terminal. Jen and Judy have a confrontation about what to do next: Jen wants Judy to continue treatment, but Judy wants to live life to its fullest as long as she has left. Judy visits Eleanor, who has been released from prison and is now living in a halfway house; Eleanor asks to live with Judy. Judy refuses with an excuse, but gives her mom an envelope full of money. Eleanor then shows up at Jen's house, suspicious over the money. Meanwhile, Judy has gone to Nick to falsely confess that she killed Steve, having decided that since she will die soon anyway, she will take the blame. Jen has managed to get Judy admitted into a cancer treatment trial and convinces Nick to give Judy three weeks to participate in the trial before turning her in. Jen takes Judy home to find Eleanor, who now knows the truth about Judy's illness; she agrees to help Judy live out the rest of her life in dignity. Jen and Judy leave for Mexico.
30	10	"We've Reached the End"	Liz Feldman	Liz Feldman	November 17, 2022
Judy and Jen continue their road trip to Mexico, but during a stop they are confronted by Greek mafia hitmen; Judy uses Jen's gun to fend them off. Jen and Judy arrive at the Wood family vacation home in Mexico and spend many days there enjoying sunsets and the beach and reminiscing. Jen eventually gets a phone call from Ben and tells him about her pregnancy. During this phone call, Jen and Judy learn that the FBI no longer suspects them due to the circumstances around Agent Moranis' death. Judy eventually insists that she is going to remain in Mexico until she dies from her cancer, and Jen finally accepts this. Judy and Jen discover the restored Mustang car that was the cause of Ted's death. Judy is horrified and tries to tell Jen to destroy it; Jen says that she couldn't hate that car because in the end, it brought Judy into her life. Jen awakens the next day to find a farewell note from Judy; she discovers that Judy has taken the family boat out to the ocean. It is assumed that Judy went to sea and died on the boat. Jen takes the Mustang home in time to see Henry's performance; she states that Judy is there with them as she looks up at all the paper birds Judy made during her chemotherapy. Later, Jen is shown in grief therapy with her new baby girl, Joey. In the final scene, Ben tells Jen that he is finally at peace with Steve's death (still believing it is at the hands of the Greek mafia) and that he is happy being with Jen and their family. In response, Jen says, "I have to tell you something."

== Production ==
=== Development ===
On April 5, 2018, it was announced that Netflix had given the production a series order for a first season consisting of ten episodes. The series was created by Liz Feldman who was also expected to write for the series and executive produce alongside Will Ferrell, Adam McKay, and Jessica Elbaum. Production companies involved with the series were slated to consist of Gloria Sanchez Productions and CBS Television Studios. On November 2, 2018, it was reported that Amy York Rubin would direct the first and second episodes of the series.

On April 1, 2019, it was announced that the series was set to be released on May 3, 2019. On June 3, 2019, the series was renewed for a second season, set to be released in 2020. On April 10, 2020, Netflix announced that the second season would be released on May 8, 2020. On July 6, 2020, Netflix renewed the series for a third and final season. Filming for the third and final season began on May 7, 2021; however, in August, 2021, production was paused temporarily due to Applegate’s health. On December 21, 2021, it was reported that there were positive COVID-19 cases on the set, but filming was not impacted or shut down. There were three weeks of filming left to conclude in early 2022, but filming did not wrap until April 25, 2022. The third and final season premiered on November 17, 2022.

=== Casting ===
On July 11, 2018, it was announced that Christina Applegate had been cast in one of the series' two lead roles. On August 3, 2018, it was reported that Linda Cardellini had been cast in the series' other lead role. A week later, it was announced that Max Jenkins and Luke Roessler had been cast in series regular roles. On September 12, 2018, it was reported that James Marsden and Ed Asner had been cast in starring roles. In October 2018, it was announced that Sam McCarthy had joined the cast in a series regular capacity and that Diana-Maria Riva had been cast in a recurring role. In October 2019, Natalie Morales was cast in the recurring role of Michelle on the second season.

== Reception ==
=== Critical response ===
Critical response of Dead to Me
Season	Rotten Tomatoes	Metacritic
1	86% (51 reviews)	67 (21 reviews)
2	96% (47 reviews)	72 (10 reviews)
3	85% (20 reviews)	70 (7 reviews)

==== Season 1 ====
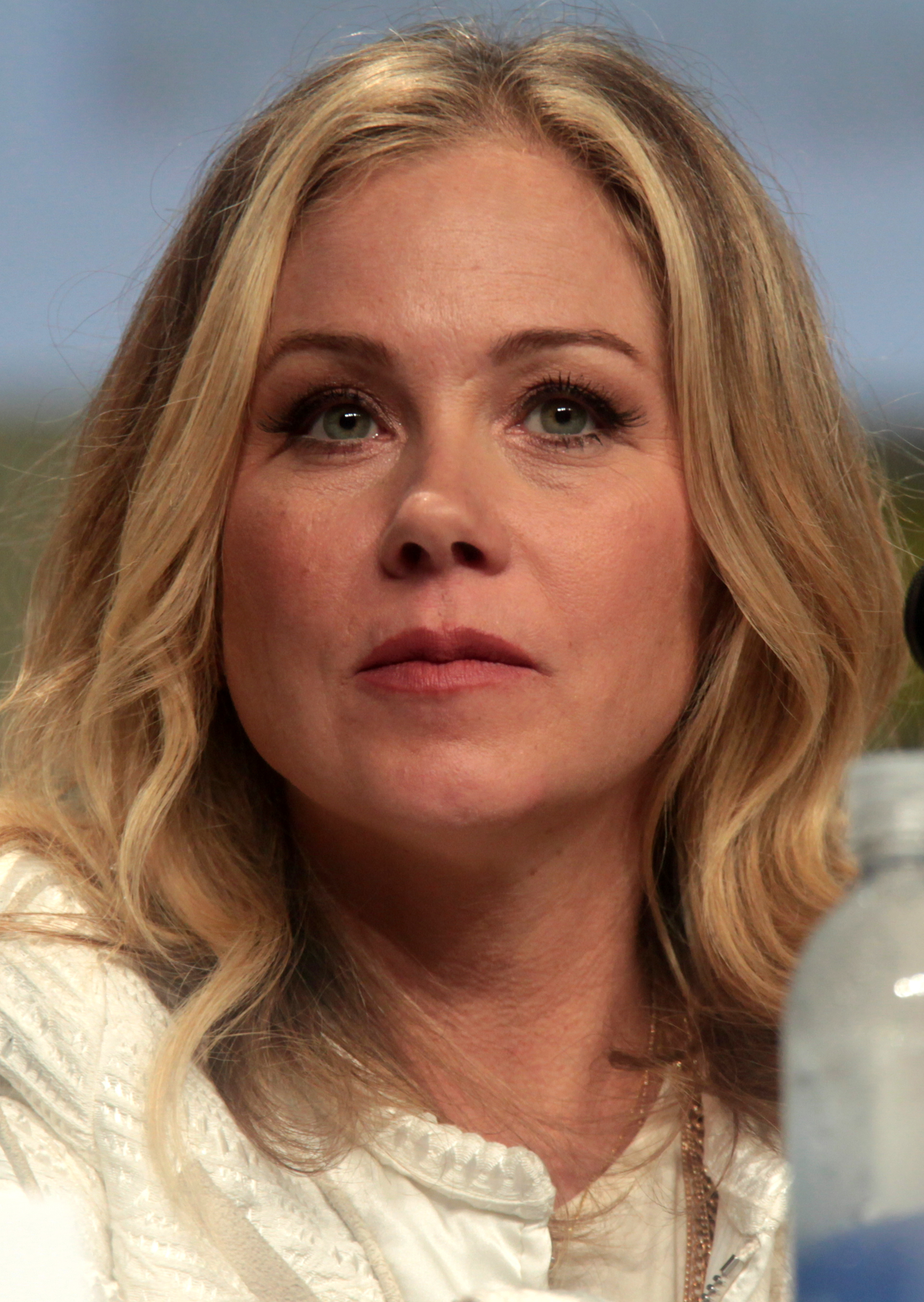
Christina Applegate's performance in the series garnered critical acclaim, earning her various award nominations.

On the review aggregator website Rotten Tomatoes, the first season has an approval rating of 86% based on 51 reviews, with an average rating of 6.5/10. The website's critics consensus reads: "Dead to Me doesn't always deliver on the gallows humor that it promises, but the sterling duo of Christina Applegate and Linda Cardellini elevates the series above its pulpier aspects—offering a deeply moving relationship shaped by mutual grief." On Metacritic, it has a weighted average score of 67 out of 100, based on 21 critics, indicating "generally favorable reviews".

==== Season 2 ====
On Rotten Tomatoes, the second season has an approval rating of 96% based on 47 reviews, with an average rating of 7.6/10. The website's critics consensus reads: "Dead to Me doubles down on the twists and turns out an exciting second season that makes excellent use of its well-matched leads." On Metacritic, it has a weighted average score of 72 out of 100, based on 10 critics, indicating "generally favorable reviews".

==== Season 3 ====
On Rotten Tomatoes, the third season holds an approval rating of 85% based on 20 reviews, with an average rating of 6.1/10. The website's critics consensus reads: "Dead to Me's final season has some diminishing returns as the twists begin to feel overplayed, but Christina Applegate and Linda Cardellini remain a compelling duo who viewers will want to stick with to the bitter end." On Metacritic, it has a weighted average score of 70 out of 100, based on 7 critics, indicating "generally favorable reviews".

=== Viewership ===
On July 17, 2019, Netflix announced that the series was on track to be streamed by over 30 million viewers within its first month of release on the streaming platform.

=== Accolades ===
Year	Award	Category	Nominee(s)	Result	Ref.
2019	TCA Awards	Outstanding New Program	Dead to Me	Nominated	
2019	Primetime Emmy Awards	Outstanding Lead Actress in a Comedy Series	Christina Applegate	Nominated	
2019	Satellite Awards	Best Actress in a Musical or Comedy Series	Christina Applegate	Nominated	
2020	Golden Globe Awards	Best Actress – Television Series Musical or Comedy	Christina Applegate	Nominated	
2020	Critics' Choice Television Awards	Best Actress in a Comedy Series	Christina Applegate	Nominated	
2020	Screen Actors Guild Awards	Outstanding Performance by a Female Actor in a Comedy Series	Christina Applegate	Nominated	
2020	Casting Society of America	Television Pilot & First Season – Comedy	Sherry Thomas, Sharon Bialy and Russell Scott	Nominated	
2020	Writers Guild of America Awards	Television: New Series	Rebecca Addelman, Njeri Brown, Liz Feldman, Kelly Hutchinson, Anthony King, Emma Rathbone, Kate Robin and Abe Sylvia	Nominated	
2020	Writers Guild of America Awards	Television: Episodic Comedy	Liz Feldman (for "Pilot")	Won	
2020	TCA Awards	Outstanding Achievement in Comedy	Dead to Me	Nominated	
2020	TCA Awards	Individual Achievement in Comedy	Christina Applegate	Nominated	
2020	Primetime Emmy Awards	Outstanding Comedy Series	Liz Feldman, Will Ferrell, Adam McKay, Jessica Elbaum, Christina Applegate, Christie Smith, Linda Cardellini, Cara DiPaolo, Jessi Klein, Elizabeth Benjamin, Dan Dietz, Joe Hardesty, Buddy Enright and Denise Pleune	Nominated	
2020	Primetime Emmy Awards	Outstanding Lead Actress in a Comedy Series	Christina Applegate	Nominated	
2020	Primetime Emmy Awards	Outstanding Lead Actress in a Comedy Series	Linda Cardellini	Nominated	
2020	Primetime Creative Arts Emmy Awards	Outstanding Casting for a Comedy Series	Sherry Thomas, Russell Scott and Sharon Bialy	Nominated	
2021	Art Directors Guild Awards	Excellence in Production Design for a Half Hour Single-Camera Television Series	L.J. Houdyshell (for "You Don't Have to Go" and "It Had to Be You")	Nominated	
2021	Cinema Audio Society Awards	Outstanding Achievement in Sound Mixing for Television Series – Half Hour	Steven Michael Morantz, Brad Sherman, Alexander Gruzdev and Jason Oliver (for "You Know What You Did")	Nominated	
2021	Critics' Choice Television Awards	Best Actress in a Comedy Series	Christina Applegate	Nominated	
2021	GLAAD Media Awards	Outstanding Comedy Series	Dead to Me	Nominated	
2021	Make-Up Artists and Hair Stylists Guild Awards	Best Contemporary Make-Up	Jacqueline Knowlton, Toryn Reed, Kim Greene and Liz Lash	Nominated	
2021	Motion Picture Sound Editors Awards	Outstanding Achievement in Sound Editing – Live Action Under 35 Minutes	Walter Newman, Darleen Stoker, Ron Salalses, Amber Funk, Peter Reynolds, Arno Stephanian, Sanaa Kelley and Matt Salib (for "If You Only Knew")	Nominated	
2021	Satellite Awards	Best Television Series – Musical or Comedy	Dead to Me	Nominated	
2021	Satellite Awards	Best Actress in a Musical or Comedy Series	Christina Applegate	Nominated	
2021	Satellite Awards	Best Actress in a Musical or Comedy Series	Linda Cardellini	Nominated	
2021	Screen Actors Guild Awards	Outstanding Performance by an Ensemble in a Comedy Series	Christina Applegate, Linda Cardellini, Max Jenkins, James Marsden, Sam McCarthy, Natalie Morales, Diana Maria Riva and Luke Roessler	Nominated	
2021	Screen Actors Guild Awards	Outstanding Performance by a Female Actor in a Comedy Series	Christina Applegate	Nominated	
2021	Screen Actors Guild Awards	Outstanding Performance by a Female Actor in a Comedy Series	Linda Cardellini	Nominated	
2021	Writers Guild of America Awards	Television: Episodic Comedy	Liz Feldman and Kelly Hutchinson (for "It's Not You, It's Me")	Nominated	
2023	Critics' Choice Television Awards	Best Actress in a Comedy Series	Christina Applegate	Nominated	
2023	Critics' Choice Television Awards	Best Supporting Actor in a Comedy Series	James Marsden	Nominated	
2023	Primetime Emmy Awards	Outstanding Lead Actress in a Comedy Series	Christina Applegate	Nominated	\
2023	Screen Actors Guild Awards	Outstanding Performance by a Female Actor in a Comedy Series	Christina Applegate	Nominated	
