= Liz Feldman =

American television writer and producer

- Occupations: Comedian, writer, producer, director
- Years active: 1993–present
- Notable work: No Good Deed (2024); Dead to Me (2019–2022); The Great Indoors (2016–2017); One Big Happy (2015); 2 Broke Girls (2011–2017); Hot in Cleveland (2010–2011)

Liz Feldman is an American comedian, writer, producer and director. She is the creator and executive producer of the Netflix dark comedy series Dead to Me and No Good Deed. She also created the NBC sitcom One Big Happy and has written for 2 Broke Girls, The Ellen DeGeneres Show, and Hot in Cleveland.

== Career ==
In 1995, Feldman made her television debut as a performer and writer for All That on Nickelodeon. She is an alumna of improv groups The Second City and The Groundlings. She went on to write for Blue Collar TV, Hot in Cleveland, The Great Indoors, the 79th, 86th and 87th Academy Awards, 2 Broke Girls and The Ellen DeGeneres Show, for which she won four Emmy awards. She created the NBC sitcom One Big Happy starring Elisha Cuthbert, executive produced by Ellen DeGeneres.

From 2008 to 2017, Feldman hosted This Just Out, a YouTube talk show celebrating lesbian culture. The show was filmed at her kitchen table and featured LGBTQ and LGBTQ-friendly actors, comedians, writers, and musicians. Feldman has been an outspoken advocate for LGBTQ rights. In 2008, her joke about same-sex marriage ("It's very dear to me, the issue of gay marriage, or as I like to call it 'marriage', you know, because I had lunch this afternoon, not gay lunch. I park my car, I didn't gay park it.") went viral, recreated thousands of times across various platforms in the campaign against Prop 8, which sought to outlaw same-sex marriage.

In 2019, Feldman created and produced the Netflix dark comedy series Dead to Me, executive produced by Will Ferrell and Adam McKay. The series starred Christina Applegate and Linda Cardellini, and was produced by Gloria Sanchez Productions, the female-focused counterpart to Gary Sanchez Productions. Dead to Me premiered on Netflix on May 3, 2019. NPR TV critic David Bianculli noted, “It’s Liz Feldman’s career-best work, and it’s the career-best work for Applegate and Cardellini.” Season one of Dead to Me was fourth on Netflix’s “Top 10 Most Popular Series of 2019 in the United States.” The second season was released on Netflix on May 8, 2020. The series received four Emmy Award nominations. In July 2020, Netflix renewed the series for a third and final season. On July 6, 2020, Netflix announced that it had entered into an exclusive multi-year development deal with Feldman, under which all of her future productions will be Netflix Original series.

In 2020, Feldman won the WGA Award for Best Episodic Comedy for the pilot episode of Dead to Me. In 2021, she was again nominated for a Writers Guild Award for Episodic Comedy, and the show received three Screen Actors Guild Award nominations Nominations that year. Feldman was also named to The Hollywood Reporter's "50 Most Powerful LGBTQ Players in Hollywood" list. The final season of Dead to Me aired in November 2022. Christina Applegate was nominated for a Critics Choice Award and a Screen Actors Guild Award for Outstanding Actress in a Comedy Series.

In May 2022, Feldman announced her second show under her multi-year overall deal with Netflix: No Good Deed. The show is a dark comedy about one family selling their house, and the three families desperately trying to buy it. In this high-pressure environment, mysteries and truths unravel, and cracks are exposed. Feldman executive produces alongside Will Ferrell, Jessica Elbaum and Brittney Segal of Gloria Sanchez Productions, Christie Smith, and directing producer Silver Tree. No Good Deed dropped on Netflix on December 12, 2024, spending its first weeks in the Netflix top three shows in the U.S. Feldman reunites with Linda Cardellini on the show, which also stars Lisa Kudrow, Ray Romano and Luke Wilson, Denis Leary, O-T Fagbenle, Teyonah Parris, Abbi Jacobson and Poppy Liu. No Good Deed was included on Deadline's "The 7 Best Shows to Stream in December 2024."

== Awards and nominations ==
| Year | Association | Category | Nominated work | Result | Ref. |
|---|---|---|---|---|---|
| 2006 | Daytime Emmy Awards | Outstanding Special Class Writing | The Ellen DeGeneres Show | Won | |
| 2006 | Daytime Emmy Awards | Outstanding Talk Show | The Ellen DeGeneres Show | Won | |
| 2007 | Daytime Emmy Awards | Outstanding Special Class Writing | The Ellen DeGeneres Show | Won | |
| 2007 | Daytime Emmy Awards | Outstanding Talk Show | The Ellen DeGeneres Show | Won | |
| 2008 | Daytime Emmy Awards | Outstanding Special Class Writing | The Ellen DeGeneres Show | Nominated | |
| 2008 | Daytime Emmy Awards | Outstanding Talk Show | The Ellen DeGeneres Show | Nominated | |
| 2020 | Writers Guild of America Awards | Episodic Comedy | Dead to Me: "Pilot" | Won | |
| 2020 | Writers Guild of America Awards | New Series | Dead to Me | Nominated | |
| 2020 | Primetime Emmy Awards | Outstanding Comedy Series | Dead to Me | Nominated | |
