= Amy Tolsky =

American actress

- Occupation: Actress
- Years active: 1993–present

Amy Tolsky is an American actress. She has appeared in several films and television shows.

== Selected filmography ==
- Quiz Lady (2023) – Leah
- Atypical (2017) - Head PTA Mom
- Married (2014) – Ortho Receptionist
- General Hospital (2014) – Stacy
- Jewvangelist (2014) – Mrs. Coen
- Eat With Me (2013) – Candy
- Castle (2013) – Sue Williams
- Old Souls (2013 TV movie) – Snarky Agent
- Holding Patterns (2013 TV movie) – Flight Attendant
- 2 Broke Girls (2012) – Staples Lady / Violet
- Last Man Standing (2012) – Mrs. Flagg
- See Dad Run (2012) – Mom
- Parks and Recreation (2012) – Lucinda
- The Big Bang Theory (2012) – Joan
- Bent (2012) – Gayle
- Raising Hope (2012) – Gwen
- Weeds (2011) – Desk Attendant
- Wizards of Waverly Place (2011) – Florence
- Hawthorne (2010) – Doctor
- The Closer (2009) – Nurse
- Trust Me (2009) – Curly Hair
- The New Adventures of Old Christine (2008) – Heidi Baker
- Terminator: The Sarah Connor Chronicles (2008) – Housewife
- Out of Jimmy's Head (2007) – Coach
- Cory in the House (2007) – Dr. Vanderslyce
- Burn (2007 TV movie) – Mrs. Greenburg
- That's So Raven (2006) – Mrs. Rothschild
- Cooked (2005 TV movie) – Real Estate Lady
- Humor Me (2004 TV movie) – Real Estate Lady
- Christmas Rush (2002 TV movie; voice role)
- Scrubs (2002) – Bespectacled Nurse
- The Amanda Show (2001) – Nurse
- Strong Medicine (2000–2001) – Jean
- The Nanny (1999) – Singer
- Chicks (1999 TV movie) – Spa Woman
- Caroline in the City (1998)
- Another House on Mercy Street (1997) – Gallery Guest
- Intimate with a Stranger (1995) – Carol
- Cinderumplestiltskin (1993 TV movie) – Bertha
- Jeeves and Wooster (1993) – Reporter
