= Katy Garretson =

American television director

- Born: Kathleen Elizabeth Garretson; Nuremberg, West Germany
- Other name: Kathleen E. Garretson
- Occupation: Television director / Television producer / Podcaster
- Spouse: Jonathan Axelrod (m. 2011; div. 2015)
- Website: katygarretson.com, mojogirlmadness.com

Kathleen Elizabeth Garretson is an American television director, producer and podcaster. Garretson has directed episodes of the sitcoms Frasier, 2 Broke Girls, Fuller House and the season one finale of the Punky Brewster reboot in 2021, among others, as well as producing Hallmark's Garage Sale Mystery movies. She received the Frank Capra Lifetime Achievement Award from the Directors Guild of America (DGA) in 2012. Garretson also hosted the hit podcast Mojo Girl Madness.

== Early life ==
Kathleen Garretson was born in Nuremberg, West Germany, where her father, a Captain in the U.S. Air Force, was stationed. Her parents were John Thomas Garretson, of Tucson, Arizona, where he earned his business degree from the University of Arizona, and Elinor Van Haltern, from Dallas, Texas, and a graduate of Southern Methodist University (SMU). Garretson is a graduate of the University of Southern California in Los Angeles, earning degrees in both Journalism and Business Communications. At USC, Garretson was a member of the Delta Delta Delta sorority, and was an award-winning member of the USC Speech & Debate Team. She became interested in the film industry while working at her college job as a tour guide at Universal Studios.

== Career ==
A TV director and a professor of directing at the University of Southern California School of Cinematic Arts, Garretson has had a long career in entertainment. Following graduation from the University of Southern California, and a brief run as a production assistant and stand-in, Garretson was accepted into the Directors Guild of America training program. Following a two-year trainee period, she then fully joined the DGA as an assistant director. During her first few years as a DGA member, Garretson worked mainly on made-for-TV films and feature films. Her credits include the feature films Star Trek VI: The Undiscovered Country, Clifford, Switch and The Specialist.

Garretson continued to work as an assistant director on "movies of the week", features and commercials for several years, until she was hired to be an assistant director on the sitcom Frasier. She slowly segued out of being an AD on "single-camera" productions as her credit list on "multi-camera" shows grew. Garretson then made her directorial debut during Frasier's sixth season. She was nominated for a Directors Guild of America Award for "Best Comedy Director of 1999" for her first directing assignment. She continued to direct episodes of Frasier until the show's end in 2004. Her other directing credits include the new Punky Brewster reboot for Peacock, Carol's Second Act with Patricia Heaton, Broke with Pauley Perrette, The Cool Kids, Alexa & Katie, Fuller House, 2 Broke Girls, The Odd Couple, One Big Happy, Young & Hungry, Sullivan & Son, Titus, Reba, Girlfriends, George Lopez, Freddie, One on One, True Jackson, VP and the animated series Sid the Science Kid.

In January 2012, Garretson was awarded the Frank Capra Lifetime Achievement Award from the DGA. She was the 26th recipient of this award since the Guild was founded, and it was presented to her by director Michael Apted. Garretson served as an Associate National Board member and three-term Council Chair at the DGA, and on numerous guild committees. She currently serves the Directors Guild of America as a member of the PAC Leadership Committee, the Frank Capra Award Committee, and the Western Directors Council Ethics Committee.

Garretson took a three-year hiatus from directing from early-2012 through 2014 to serve as the CEO/Executive Director of the non-profit I Have A Dream Foundation - Los Angeles. She had been a mentor and volunteer with the organization for many years, and was asked to oversee a rebuilding and revitalization of the foundation. This was accomplished by the end of 2014, and Garretson returned to her creative roots in film and television production.

Garretson is also a television producer, and in 2011-12, found, developed and was the supervising producer on a TV movie, Garage Sale Mystery, for Hallmark Channel. This movie, which aired in September 2013, broke nearly every ratings record for the Hallmark Channel, and in March 2014, Hallmark announced it would re-brand its movie channel to be the Hallmark Movies & Mysteries Channel, and would have a "wheel" of mystery movies led by new Garage Sale Mysteries. Fifteen Garage Sale Mysteries have aired and four new ones were scheduled to air in August, 2019, however midway through shooting of the seventeenth GSM, the star was indicted in the college admissions scandal and the movie series was cancelled by Hallmark.

Garretson has long been active in the Directors Guild of America and the Academy of Television Arts & Sciences, speaking on numerous panels and seminars. She has also taught classes on sitcom directing at the American Film Institute in Los Angeles and has been a guest speaker for multiple courses at both the USC School of Cinematic Arts, where she now teaches a graduate course on directing, and the Screenwriting Program at UCLA. Additionally, Garretson has remained active as an alumna of USC. She served on the inaugural Alumni Board of Directors for the Annenberg School of Journalism and Communications, and is a booster and avid fan of USC Trojan Football.

== Filmography ==
=== Film ===
Year	Title	Role	Note(s)
1988	Cop	Stand-In	
1989	Black Rain	DGA Trainee	
1991	Switch	Second Assistant Director	
1991	Star Trek VI: The Undiscovered Country	Second Assistant Director	
1994	Clifford	Second Assistant Director	
1994	Double Dragon	Second Assistant Director	
1994	The Message	Producer	Short
2008	Arctic: Change at the Top of the World	Writer/Producer	

=== Television ===
Year	Title	Role	Note(s)
1989	Third Degree Burn	DGA Trainee	TV movie
1989	L.A. Law	DGA Trainee	2 episodes
1990	Columbo	Second Assistant Director	3 episodes
1992	Dear John	Second Assistant Director	Episode: "Poor John: Part 1"
1992	Bob	Second Assistant Director	Episode: "Mad Dog Returns"
1992-93	Love & War	Second Assistant Director	2 episodes
1993	Rio Shannon	Second Assistant Director	TV movie
1994-2004	Frasier	First Assistant Director/Second Assistant Director/Director/Voice of "Computer"	204 episodes
1995	Kidnapped: In the Line of Duty	Second Assistant Director	TV movie
1995	Hudson Street	Second Assistant Director	Episode: "Pilot"
1995	The Pursit of Happiness	First Assistant Director	Episode: "Pilot"
1996	Lush Life	First Assistant Director	Episode: "Pilot"
1996	Pearl	First Assistant Director	Episode: "Pilot"
1998	Encore! Encore!	First Assistant Director	Episode: "Pilot"
1998	Better Days	First Assistant Director	Episode: "Pilot"
1999	Love & Money	First Assistant Director	Episode: "Pilot"
2000	Welcome to New York	First Assistant Director	Episode: "Pilot"
2002	Titus	Director	Episode: "The Visit"
2002	In-Laws	First Assistant Director	Episode: "Pilot"
2002	Bram & Alice	First Assistant Director	Episode: "Pilot"
2002	Reba	Director	3 episodes
2003-05	Girlfriends	Director	5 episodes
2003-06	One on One	Director	3 episodes
2003	The Pitts	Director	Episode: "Squarewolves"
2003	Still Standing	Director	Episode: "Still the Bad Parents"
2003	Wanda at Large	Director	Episode: "They Shoot Reporters"
2005	The Bad Girls Club	Director	Episode: "The Guide to in and Out"
2005	Love, Inc.	Director	2 episodes
2006	Cuts	Director	Episode: "The Love Below"
2006	Living with Fran	Director	Episode: "The Whole Clan with Fran"
2006	Freddie	Director	4 episodes
2006	George Lopez	Director	2 episodes
2007	Lovebites	Director	2 episodes
2008-2015	Sid the Science Kid	Director	42 episodes
2008	Rita Rocks	Director	2 episodes
2009	True Jackson, VP	Director	2 episodes
2011	Shake It Up	Director	Episode: "Heat It Up"
2013	Garage Sale Mystery	Producer	TV movie
2014	Sullivan & Son	Director	Episode: "You, Me, and Gary"
2014	Garage Sale Mystery: All That Glitters	Producer	TV movie
2015	One Big Happy	Director	Episode: "A Tale of Two Hubbies"
2015	Young & Hungry	Director	5 episodes
2015	Garage Sale Mystery: The Deadly Room	Producer	TV movie
2015	Garage Sale Mystery: The Wedding Dress	Producer	TV movie
2016	2 Broke Girls	Director	4 episodes
2016	The Odd Couple	Director	2 episodes
2016	Fuller House	Director	5 episodes
2016	Garage Sale Mystery: Guilty Until Proven Innocent	Producer	TV movie
2016	Garage Sale Mystery: The Novel Murders	Producer	TV movie
2017-18	School of Rock	Director	3 episodes
2017	Garage Sale Mystery: The Art of Murder	Producer	TV movie
2017	Garage Sale Mystery: The Beach Murder	Producer	TV movie
2017	Garage Sale Mystery: Murder by Text	Producer	TV movie
2017	Garage Sale Mystery: Murder Most Mediveal	Producer	TV movie
2017	Garage Sale Mystery: A Case of Murder	Producer	TV movie
2018	Alexa & Katie	Director	3 episodes
2018	Living Biblically	Director	Episode: "Thou Shalt Not Covet"
2018	Garage Sale Mystery: Pandora's Box	Producer	TV movie
2018	Garage Sale Mystery: The Mask Murder	Producer	TV movie
2018	Garage Sale Mystery: Picture a Murder	Producer	TV movie
2018	Garage Sale Mystery: Murder In D Minor	Producer	TV movie
2018-19	The Cool Kids	Director	2 episodes
2019	Cousins for Life	Director	2 episodes
2019	Garage Sale Mystery: Searched & Seized	Producer	TV movie
2019	Carol's Second Act	Director	Episode: "Therapy Dogs"
2020	Broke	Director	2 episodes
