= Jessica Elbaum =

American film producer

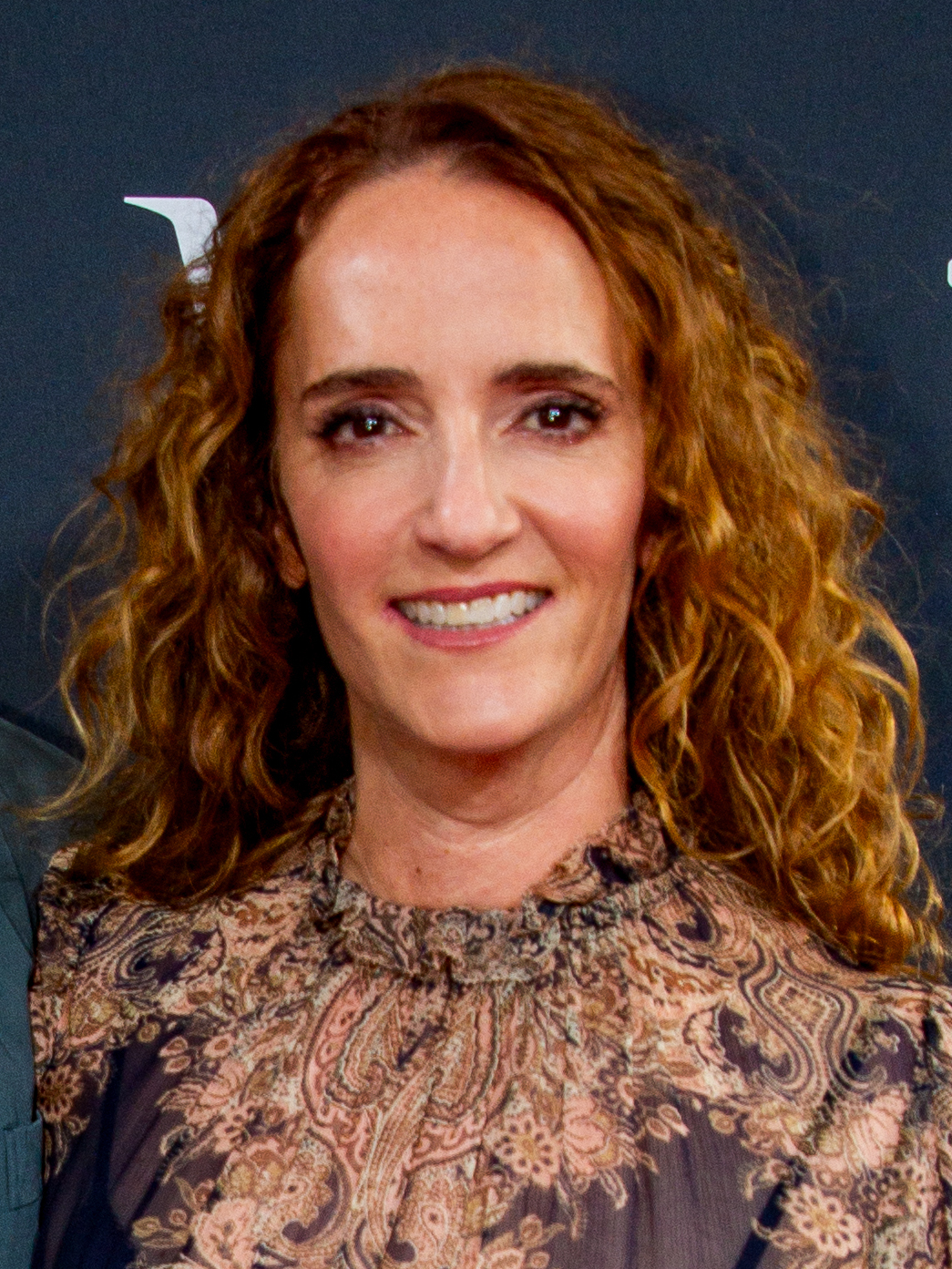
- Elbaum at the 2024 Toronto International Film Festival
- Born: 1977 or 1978 (age 48–49); Los Angeles, California, U.S.
- Education: University of Southern California
- Occupation: Producer
- Years active: 2004–present
- Spouse: Rafael Marmor

Jessica Elbaum is an American producer. She is best known for co-founding the production company Gloria Sanchez Productions with Will Ferrell and Adam McKay in 2014. She has been nominated for three Primetime Emmy Awards, won one Emmy Award and won "Best First Feature" at the 36th Independent Spirit Awards for producing the film Booksmart.

== Early life and education ==
Jessica Elbaum was born in Los Angeles, California. She is a graduate of the University of Southern California.

== Career ==
Elbaum's first job after graduating from the University of Southern California was public relations at MGM Studios. She later left MGM to join her family's car washing business in San Fernando Valley. In the 2000s, Elbaum was an assistant to talent agent Julie Darmody.

In 2004, a friend of Elbaum recommended a desk job on Will Ferrell's team, which later lead to Elbaum becoming Ferrell's personal assistant. Her first day as Ferrell's assistant was spent on set for Anchorman: The Legend of Ron Burgundy reshoots. In 2012, she produced her first feature film, the comedy Bachelorette, directed and written by Leslye Headland, and stars Kirsten Dunst, Isla Fisher, Lizzy Caplan, Rebel Wilson, and James Marsden.

In 2014, Elbaum co-founded the production company Gloria Sanchez Productions with Ferrell and Adam McKay. The company was set up as a female counterpart to Ferrell and McKay's production company Gary Sanchez Productions, with a focus on female voices in comedy.

== Personal life ==
Elbaum is married to film producer Rafael Marmor, the co-founder of the production company, Delirio Films.

== Filmography ==
=== Film ===
Year	Title	Producer	Ref.
2008	Step Brothers	Associate	
2009	Land of the Lost	Associate	
2010	The Other Guys	Co-producer	
2012	Bachelorette	Yes	
2012	Casa de mi padre	Executive	
2013	Anchorman 2: The Legend Continues	Executive	
2014	Welcome to Me	Yes	
2015	Sleeping with Other People	Yes	
2015	Get Hard	Executive	
2015	A Deadly Adoption	Executive	
2015	Daddy's Home	Executive	
2017	Oh Lucy!	Yes	
2017	The House	Executive	
2018	Holmes & Watson	Executive	
2019	Booksmart	Yes	
2019	Hustlers	Yes	
2020	Eurovision Song Contest: The Story of Fire Saga	Yes	
2021	Barb and Star Go to Vista Del Mar	Yes	
2022	Am I OK?	Yes	
2022	Spirited	Yes	
2023	Theater Camp	Yes	
2023	May December	Yes	
2023	Quiz Lady	Yes	
2024	Will & Harper	Yes	
2025	You're Cordially Invited	Yes	

=== Television ===
Executive producer

Year	Title	Ref.
2009	You're Welcome America: A Final Night With George W. Bush	
2017–2019	I'm Sorry	
2019–2022	Dead to Me	
2021	The Shrink Next Door	
2022	The Woman in the House Across the Street from the Girl in the Window	
2024	No Good Deed	
