= Marc Evan Jackson =

American comedian and actor (born 1970)

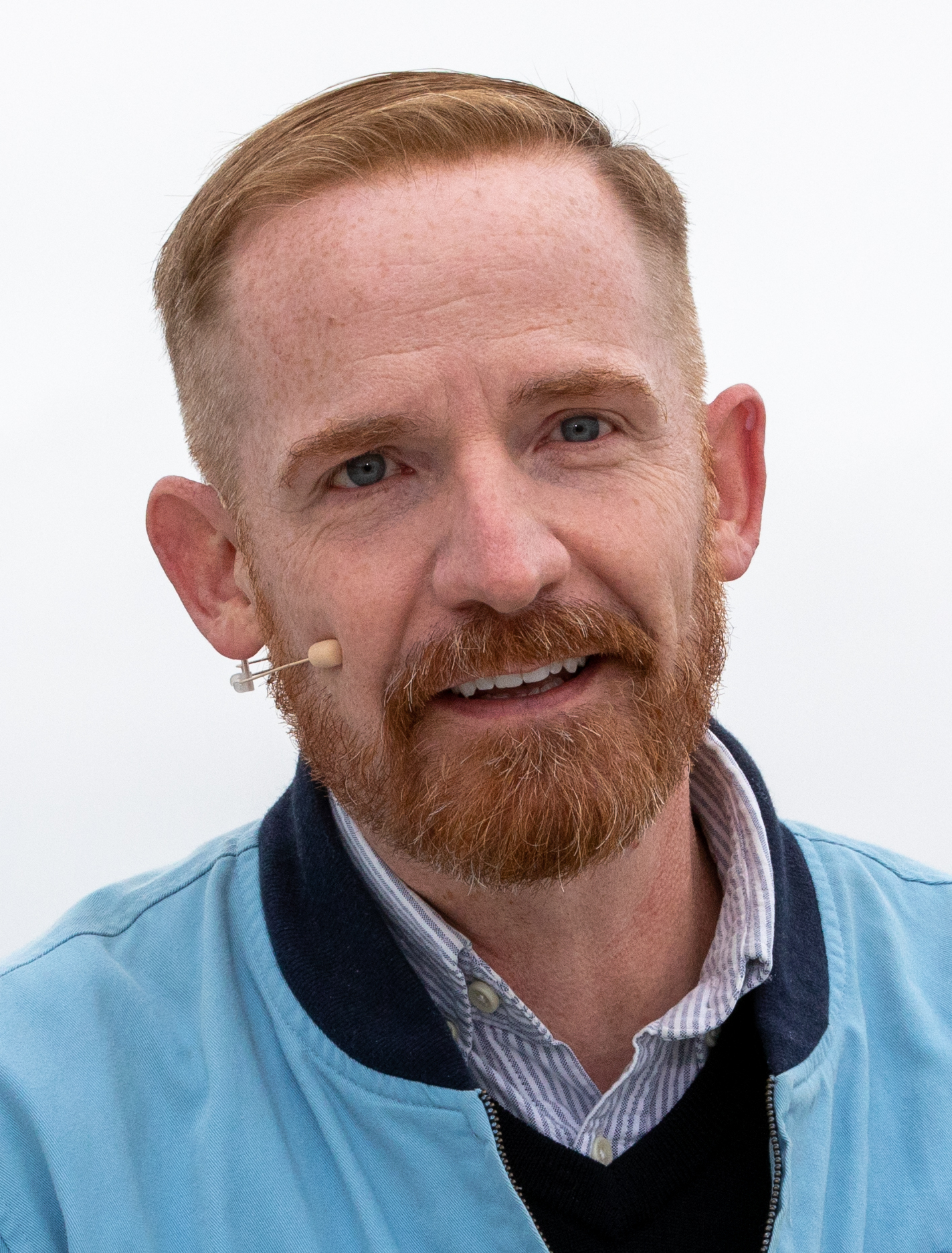
- Jackson in 2021
- Born: August 21, 1970 (age 56); Buffalo, New York, U.S.
- Education: Calvin University
- Occupations: Actor; comedian; voice-over artist
- Years active: 1998–present
- Spouse: Beth Hagenlocker (m. 2002)

Marc Evan Jackson (born August 21, 1970) is an American comedian and actor. He is a frequent collaborator of Michael Schur, appearing in major supporting roles as Kevin Cozner in Brooklyn Nine-Nine, Trevor Nelsson in Parks and Recreation, and Shawn in The Good Place, as well as a smaller role in A Man on the Inside. Other notable roles include Sparks Nevada in the Thrilling Adventure Hour, Dr. Murphy in 22 Jump Street, Steve Woodward in Kong: Skull Island, and Bradford Buzzard in the Disney series DuckTales.

== Early life and education ==
Marc Evan Jackson was born on August 21, 1970 in Buffalo, New York. He grew up in nearby Amherst, New York, along with his two siblings, a brother and a sister.

He graduated from Amherst Central High School in 1988, and obtained a bachelor's degree from Calvin College in 1992 with a major in philosophy and minors in political science and environmental studies. While in college, he also participated in theatrical productions.

During summers, Jackson worked as a deck hand on the MV Americana. After graduating from college, he spent a few years working on schooners, both in Michigan, as a deck hand on the schooner Malabar, and in Maine, as first mate on the Mercantile. He also worked as a producer and host for WGVU-FM, a National Public Radio affiliate in Michigan, replacing Bill Freeman as the host of the Morning Show in 1997.

== Career ==
=== Improv ===
Jackson started his improv career with River City Improv, a group associated with Calvin University, after attending a rehearsal to play the piano. Jackson later joined The Second City Detroit, becoming a member of the main company in 1998. While at Second City Detroit he participated in the 1999 show "Phantom Menace to Society."

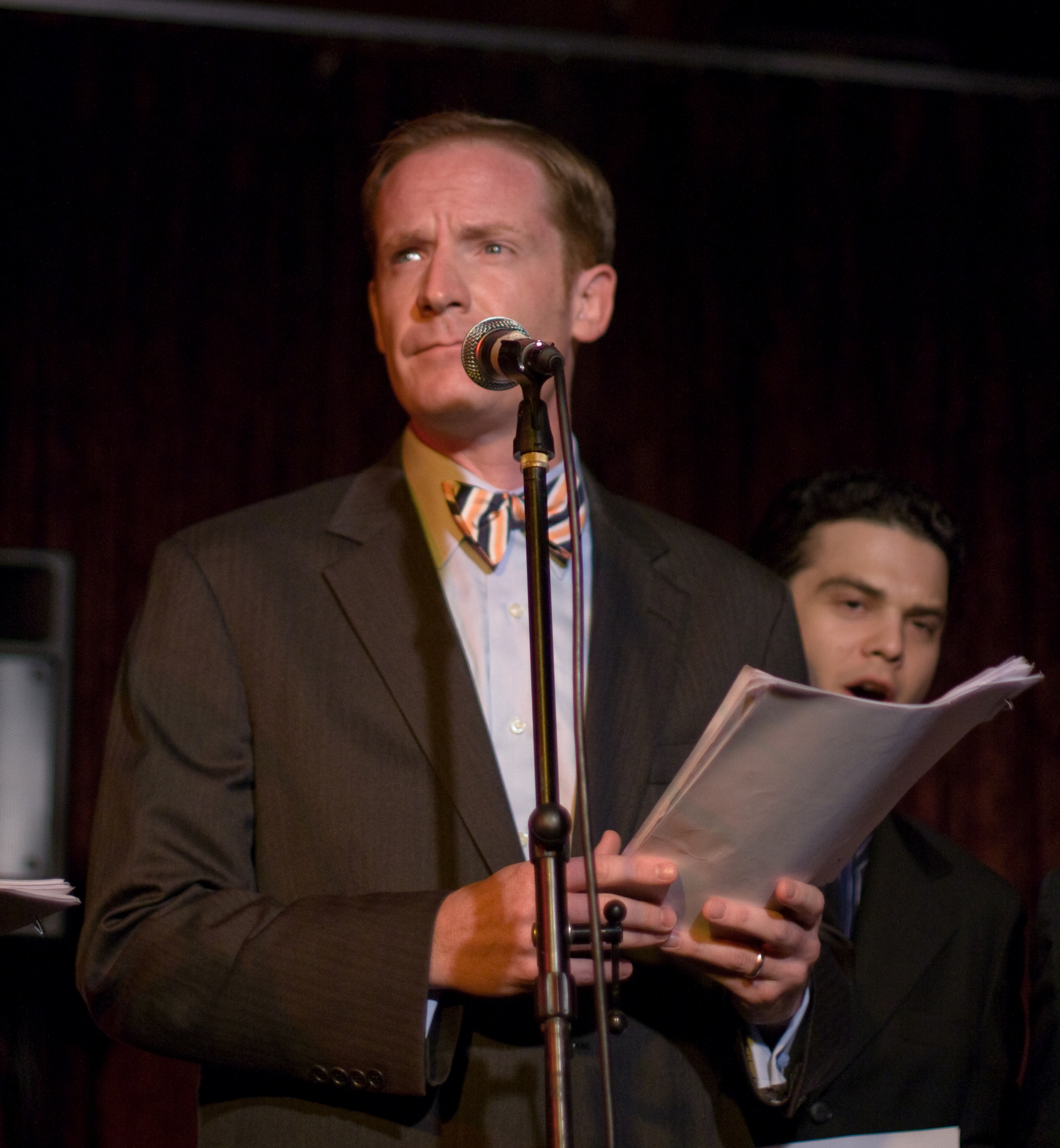
Jackson in 2008

Jackson moved to Los Angeles in 2001. He taught improv at Second City Hollywood. He joined the long-form improv group called "The 313" in 2003. The 313 is named for Detroit's area code and is made up of mostly former Detroit residents, including Keegan-Michael Key, Larry Joe Campbell, Joshua Funk, Nyima Funk, Andy Cobb, Maribeth Monroe, and Jaime Moyer. The 313 continues to perform at comedy festivals around the country, including Las Vegas, San Francisco, and Detroit.

After meeting Mark Gagliardi and Ben Acker at Second City Hollywood, Jackson was invited to one of the first rehearsals of what would become the Thrilling Adventure Hour and became a member of the WorkJuice Players, playing Sparks Nevada in the regular segment "Sparks Nevada, Marshal on Mars". The show has been running as a live stage show since 2005 and has been published as a podcast since January 2011. Jackson also appeared in the film Drones, which was written by Acker and Blacker and directed by Amber Benson and Adam Busch.

Jackson is one half of a double act with comedian Carrie Clifford in which they play Sky & Nancy Collins, characters who live in Orange County and are trying stand-up for the first time because their friends find them funny. They have appeared on Last Comic Standing, on Last Call with Carson Daly, and at the Hollywood Improv.

=== Acting ===
Jackson starred in a web series in 2011 directed by Jordan Vogt-Roberts called Fox Compton. He has gone on to work with Vogt-Roberts many times, including on the film The Kings of Summer in 2013, Kong: Skull Island in 2017 and in the television series Mash Up on Comedy Central. Jackson has made guest appearances in a number of other television series, including Key & Peele, Psych, Arrested Development, Happy Endings, The Middle, 2 Broke Girls, Modern Family, Kroll Show, Hello Ladies, and Black-ish. In 2012, Jackson starred in Suit Up, a web series co-produced by DirecTV and Fox Digital Studio, as Jim Dunnigan. Suit Up was the first of Fox Digital Studio's series to be picked up for a second season.

In January 2012, Jackson stood in for Bradley Cooper to play the part of Ben in a staged reunion performance of Wet Hot American Summer at the San Francisco Comedy Festival.

Jackson appeared as attorney Trevor Nelsson in 10 episodes of Michael Schur's comedy series Parks and Recreation. From 2013 to 2021 he played Kevin Cozner, the husband of Captain Raymond Holt, played by Andre Braugher, in Schur and Dan Goor's series Brooklyn Nine-Nine. He continued his affiliation with Schur in The Good Place as Shawn, who is first identified as the judge of conflicts between the Good Place and the Bad Place, but is later revealed to be a supervisor of the Bad Place. Jackson hosted The Good Place: The Podcast and Brooklyn Nine-Nine: The Podcast for NBC.

Jackson had a supporting role in the Amazon pilot The Rebels, which premiered online in 2014 but was not picked up for a full series. In February 2014, it was announced that Jackson would play the role of Jim in the Fox pilot titled Fatrick, along with Marcia Cross. The pilot was not picked-up as a series.

=== Voice work ===
Jackson is known for his voiceover work, which includes movies like President Wolfman, radio series such as Adventures in Odyssey and web series including Funny or Die Presents: Brick Novax's Diary.

In October 2013, Jackson appeared as Marcus Vanston in a live performance of the podcast Welcome to Night Vale. This episode, titled "The Debate", was released on May 1, 2014.

=== Advertising ===
Jackson has appeared in numerous national ad campaigns, including Farmers Insurance with J. K. Simmons, Sears, Coors, Aaron's, Progressive, DirecTV and AT&T.

== Personal life ==
Jackson married veterinarian Beth Hagenlocker on April 27, 2002. They live in Venice, Los Angeles, with their cats Penny and Snug.

Jackson is known for wearing a bow tie, both in character as Sparks Nevada as well as out of character.

=== Charity work ===
Jackson co-founded the Detroit Creativity Project, which teaches Detroit public school students improv as a vehicle for improving their communication skills, along with Hagenlocker, Key, Margaret Edwartowski, and Larry Joe Campbell. The Project, which was inspired by a statement by Detroit mayor Dave Bing, was founded after a series of cookouts held at Jackson and Hagenlocker's home with other actors, writers, and directors who had connections to the city. In 2015 the program expanded to teach 500 students in 19 different schools.

Jackson and Hagenlocker are also supporters of the non-profit 826LA and Jackson frequently participates in events for the organization.

== Filmography ==
=== Film ===
Key
†	Denotes films that have not yet been released

Year	Title	Role	Notes
2000	Garage: A Rock Saga	The Saucy Chef	
2003	Melvin Goes to Dinner	Extra	
2009	Transformers: Revenge of the Fallen	Commander, US Central Command	
2009	The Slammin' Salmon	Dry Sac Customer	
2010	Drones	Ian	
2010	Bright Day!	Tripp Bailey	
2011	Good News, Oklahoma!	Tucker	Short
2012	The Babymakers	Jefferey	
2012	Karaoke Man	Marble	
2012	President Wolfman	John Wolfman	Voice
2013	The Kings of Summer	Mr. Keenan	
2014	22 Jump Street	Dr. Martin P. Murphy	
2015	Tenured	Jerry Trask	
2015	Bad Night	John	
2016	Popstar: Never Stop Never Stopping	"Teacher" during song performance	Deleted scene
2016	Mono	Agent James	
2017	Kong: Skull Island	Steve Woodward	
2017	Jumanji: Welcome to the Jungle	Principal Bentley	
2018	Can You Ever Forgive Me?	Lloyd	
2019	Bombshell	Chris Wallace	
2020	The High Note	Alec	
2021	Queenpins	Doctor Girard	
2021	Finding ʻOhana	Robinson	
2024	Popular Theory	Arthur Page	
2024	The Disruptors	Bruce Marcus	
2024	Red One	Rick	
2026	Wildwood	Lars Svik	

=== Television ===
Year	Title	Role	Notes
2002	One on One	The Store Clerk	Episode: "Give Me Some Credit"
2003	ILL-ustrated	Various characters (voice)	Various episodes
2006	Campaign Trail	Bobbie Grant	TV movie
2006	According to Jim	Harried Guy	Episode: "Belaboring the Point"
2007	Case Closed	Nathan Shadle	TV movie
2007	Revenge	Gordon	Pilot
2007	Carpoolers	Man on Street	Episode: "The Seminar"
2008	Last Comic Standing	Himself	Episode: "Auditions 3"
2008	Reno 911!	Amnesiac	Episode: "The Wall"
2008	The Consultants	Brandon	Pilot
2008	Scare Tactics	Various	2 episodes
2008	Atom TV	Jay	Episode #1.14
2008	Carpet Bros	Xavier Montrose Raylon	6 episodes
2008	Last Call with Carson Daly	Sky Collins	1 episode
2009	Super Dave's Spike Tacular		4 episodes
2009	The Burr Effect	Mansion Security	Pilot
2010	Vamped Out	Audition Actor #2	Episode: "A New Day"
2011	Funny or Die Presents: Brick Novax's Diary	Brick Novax (voice)	4 episodes
2011–2014	Workaholics	Dr. Gerald Landes	2 episodes
2011	Psych	Sheldon Gates	Episode: "In for a Penny..."
2011	Kickin' It	Doctor Rose	Episode: "Breaking Board"
2012	Wolfpack of Reseda	Rod	3 episodes
2012	Mash Up	Various	Various episodes
2012	Happy Endings	Fishmonger	Episode: "More Like Stanksgiving"
2012	RVC: The Lone Shopping Network	Surgeon	
2012	You're Whole	Jim Rigmann	
2012–2013	Suit Up	Jim Dunnigan	16 episodes
2012–2013	Key & Peele	Various	2 episodes
2013	2 Broke Girls	Eli	Episode: "And the Temporary Distraction"
2013	Arrested Development	Storage Auctioneer	Episode: "Colony Collapse"
2013	Hello Ladies	Manager	Episode: "The Limo"
2013–2015	Kroll Show	Various	4 episodes
2013–2015	Parks and Recreation	Trevor Nelsson	10 episodes
2014–2021	Brooklyn Nine-Nine	Dr. Kevin Cozner	18 episodes
2014	The Spoils of Babylon	Bank Man	Episode: "The Foundling"
2014	The Middle	Professor Danziger	Episode: "The Carpool"
2014	Modern Family	Tad	Episode: "Spring-a-Ding-Fling"
2014	The Rebels	Phil Mavon	Pilot
2014	Fatrick	Jim	Pilot
2014–2017	Adventure Time	Kim Kil Whan/Mr. F (voice)	3 episodes
2014	I Didn't Do It	Mr. Buffington	Episode: "Lindy Nose Best"
2014–2015	You're the Worst	Therapist	2 episodes
2014	The League	Mr. Rappaport	Episode: "Sitting Shiva"
2014	Masters of Sex	Harold	Episode: "One for the Money, Two for the Show"
2014	Newsreaders	Ryan Rosenberg	Episode: "Motorboating Dads; the Negative $100,000 Question"
2014	Nick Offerman: American Ham	IP Attorney	TV special
2015	Cocked	Ken	Pilot
2015	Man Seeking Woman	Judge	Episode: "Gavel"
2015–2016	Comedy Bang! Bang!	Proctor / Father Peters	2 episodes
2015	The Spoils Before Dying	Kermit Biggs	5 episodes
2015	Stunted	Whoopi Goldberg	Pilot
2015	Rizzoli & Isles	Dr. Hart	Episode: "Fake It 'Til You Make It"
2015	Black-ish	David Cooper	Episode: "Churched"
2016	The People's Mayor	Commissioner Gordon	Pilot
2016	Superstore	Television Reporter (voice only)	Episode: "Spokesman Scandal"
2017–2020	The Good Place	Shawn	21 episodes
2017–2018	GLOW	Gary	2 episodes
2017	Jeff & Some Aliens	Duncan / Uprising Member (voice)	Episode: "Jeff & Some Colonists"
2017	Detroiters	Dr. Kozak	Episode: "Dream Cruise"
2017	Wrecked	Father Daddy	Episode: "Sister Mercy"
2017	Curb Your Enthusiasm	Justin	Episode: "Namaste"
2017–2021	DuckTales	Bradford Buzzard, Bentley Buzzard, Buford Buzzard (voice)	12 episodes
2018	Another Period	Captain	Episode: "The Love Boat"
2018	My Dead Ex	Vice Principal Kelly	5 episodes
2018	Mr. Neighbor's House 2	Doctor Salmonvich	TV special
2018	Living Biblically	MC	Episode: "Thou Shalt Not Covet"
2018	Better Call Saul	Henry DeVore	Episode: "Talk"
2018–2019	Splitting Up Together	Gene	6 episodes
2018	Get Shorty	Mark	Episode: "Curtains"
2019	Bajillion Dollar Propertie$	Dickie Chambers	Episode: "Love Is the Most Dangerous Game"
2019	The Selection	Shawn	Spin-off of The Good Place; Lead role; 6 episodes
2020	We Bare Bears: The Movie	Agent Trout (voice)	TV movie
2020	United We Fall	Dr. Roman	Episode: "Pilot"
2020–2022	Dead to Me	Jeff	3 episodes
2020–2021	The Baby-Sitters Club	Richard Spier	10 episodes
2020–2022	Central Park	Anton / Rich Knowles (voice)	4 episodes
2020–2021	American Dad!	Various voices	4 episodes
2021	Star Trek: Lower Decks	Various voices	2 episodes
2022	The Woman in the House Across the Street from the Girl in the Window	Wallace Faulkner	Episode: "Episode 4"
2022	American Auto	Alan Strong	Episode: "Profile"
2022	Birdgirl	Charles (voice)	Episode: "The Rejuvication"
2022	Family Guy	(voice)	Episode: "Get Stewie"
2022–2023	Transformers: EarthSpark	Agent Schloder / Delivery Man (voice)	8 episodes
2023	Digman!	The Speaker (voice)	Episode: "Fear of GAWD"
2023	Lessons in Chemistry	Dr. Leland Mason	5 episodes
2024	The Rookie	Josh Randall	Episode: "Strike Back"
2024	A Man on the Inside	Evan Cubbler	3 Episodes
2025	Big City Greens	Mob Leader (voice)	Episode: "Chip's Revenge"
2026	9-1-1	Jerry Thomas	Episode: "Imposter Syndrome"

=== Podcasts ===
Podcast	Episode	Date	Role
Guys With Feelings	Comedy Bit - Calling the Veep	2006.02.17	Vice-President Cheney
Kevin Pollak's Chat Show	#37	2010.01.19	Himself (Cast & Crew of Drones)
Kevin Pollak's Chat Show	#43	2010.03.30	Himself (1st Year Birthday, part 2)
Kevin Pollak's Chat Show	#205	2014.06.03	Himself
Comedy Bang! Bang!	#50	2010.04.23	Harry Houdini
Comedy Bang! Bang!	#284	2014.05.05	Himself
Thrilling Adventure Hour	All	2011–2020	Sparks Nevada/WorkJuice Player
Pop My Culture	#37	2011.03.22	Himself
Totally Laime	#72	2011.06.19	Himself
Dead Authors Podcast	Appendix A	2011.12.20	O. Henry
Dead Authors Podcast	Ch. 16	2013.04.02	Gore Vidal
Superego	The War of Two Worlds	2012	WorkJuice Player
The Matthew Aaron Show	#77	2012.01.23	Himself
The Matthew Aaron Show	#153	2013.06.12	Himself
Talkin Walkin	#9	2012.05.15	Himself
Kickin' It Mary Lynn Style	#5	2012.08.16	Himself
Giant Fire Breathing Robot	#149	2012.10.31	Himself
HobCast	#17	2012.12.19	Himself
HobCast	#36	2014.10.24	Himself
Welcome to Night Vale	#32.5 The Debate	2014.05.01	Marcus Vanston
Welcome to Night Vale	Thrilling Adventure Hour & Welcome to Night Vale Crossover	2014.10.01	Sparks Nevada
Welcome to Night Vale	#100 Toast	2016.12.14	Erika/Markus Vanston
Chewin' It With Kevin and Steve	#84	2014.10.29	Himself
Mutant Season	#149	2014.11.19	Himself
Spontaneanation with Paul F. Tompkins	#2	2015.04.06	Himself
Spontaneanation with Paul F. Tompkins	#4	2015.04.20	Himself
Spontaneanation with Paul F. Tompkins	#5	2015.04.27	Himself
Spontaneanation with Paul F. Tompkins	#13	2015.06.22	Himself
Spontaneanation with Paul F. Tompkins	#18	2015.07.27	Himself
Spontaneanation with Paul F. Tompkins	#23	2015.08.31	Himself
Spontaneanation with Paul F. Tompkins	#29	2015.10.12	Himself
Spontaneanation with Paul F. Tompkins	#30	2015.10.19	Himself
Spontaneanation with Paul F. Tompkins	#33	2015.11.09	Himself
Spontaneanation with Paul F. Tompkins	#67	2016.07.04	Himself
Spontaneanation with Paul F. Tompkins	#81	2016.10.10	Himself
Spontaneanation with Paul F. Tompkins	#82	2016.10.17	Himself
Spontaneanation with Paul F. Tompkins	#100	2017.02.20	Himself
Spontaneanation with Paul F. Tompkins	#122	2017.07.24	Himself
Spontaneanation with Paul F. Tompkins	#144	2017.12.25	Himself
Spontaneanation with Paul F. Tompkins	#173	2018.07.16	Himself
Spontaneanation with Paul F. Tompkins	#190	2018.11.12	Himself
Spontaneanation with Paul F. Tompkins	#196	2018.12.24	Himself
Sklarbro Country	#253	2015.05.29	Himself
The JV Club	#158	2015.06.11	Himself
The Good Place: The Podcast	All	2018–2020	Himself (Interviewer)
Brooklyn Nine-Nine: The Podcast	All	2020	Himself (Interviewer)
