= Brian Huskey =

American actor and writer (born 1968)

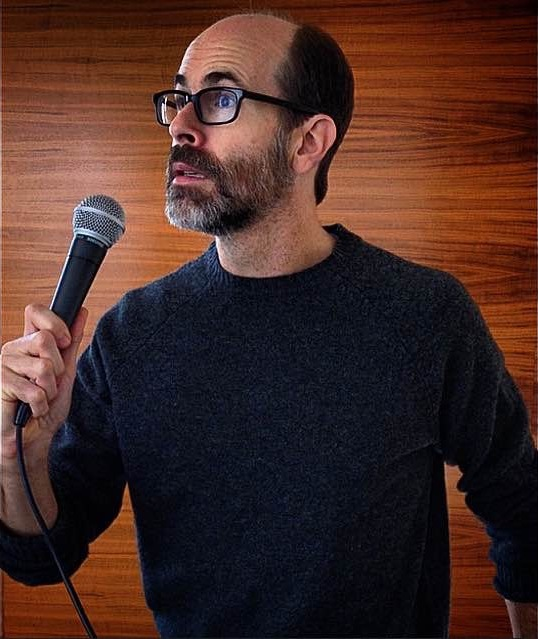
- Huskey in 2014
- Born: September 8, 1968 (age 58); Charlotte, North Carolina, U.S.
- Education: University of North Carolina at Greensboro (BA)
- Occupations: Actor; comedian; writer
- Years active: 1999–present
- Children: 1

Brian Huskey (born September 8, 1968) is an American character actor, comedian, and writer. He is best known for his roles in comedy programs such as People of Earth, Childrens Hospital, Veep, and Another Period. He also provides the voice of Regular Sized Rudy on the animated comedy Bob's Burgers.

== Early life and education ==
Huskey was born in Charlotte, North Carolina, and did not get to know his biological father until he was around the age of 15. He attended Charlotte Country Day School for the entirety of grade school and high school, graduating in 1987. He attended University of North Carolina at Greensboro, graduating with a degree in English and minor in photography. Around this time, he began to play bass guitar in the band Bicycle Face.

Huskey later relocated to New York City to attend photography school and worked as a photographer's assistant. He met and was later roommates with Rob Corddry.

== Career ==
Huskey studied and performed improvisational comedy during the start of the original Upright Citizens Brigade Theater (UCB) in New York City and had each of the "UCB4" (Matt Besser, Matt Walsh, Amy Poehler and Ian Roberts) as teachers. From there, he frequently appeared in comedy sketches on Late Night with Conan O'Brien for many years and was a panelist on VH1's Best Week Ever.

At UCB, Huskey was a member of the sketch comedy troupe The Naked Babies, with comedians Rob Corddry, Seth Morris and John Ross Bowie. The group appeared at the 1999 Big Stinkin' International Improv & Sketch Comedy Festival in Austin, Texas. He has since worked on Corddry's Adult Swim series Childrens Hospital, playing the role of Chet the creepy EMT worker, as well as alter ego Mark Splorn. Huskey also appeared as correspondent Duncan Birch on the IFC cable news satire Onion News Network.

Other programs in which Huskey co-starred include Damage Control and Free Radio. Huskey also appeared on the sitcoms Selfie and The Real O'Neals.

He made some notable early television appearances in a series of commercials opposite Molly Erdman in a campaign for Sonic Drive-In. Both actors would later be fired from this role as the result of an Onion News Network veterans parody he wrote and performed. Huskey has appeared in commercials for Wendy's, and, in 2011, "The Swagger Wagon" ad campaign for the Toyota Sienna. He has appeared in a campaign for Bai Brands alongside Justin Timberlake.

Huskey has also made many guest appearances on comedy programs including Community, Parks and Recreation, Nick Swardson's Pretend Time, Worst Week, Happy Endings, Animal Practice, The Inbetweeners, Workaholics, and Veep. He has appeared in films such as Superbad, Step Brothers, Semi-Pro, and Meet Dave.

He starred in the miniseries If Google Was A Guy on the YouTube channel CollegeHumor, acting as an anthropomorphic visualization of the search engine Google.

In 2014, Huskey co-wrote the film A Better You, with UCB co-founder Matt Walsh. Huskey starred in the film and Walsh directed.

He co-created, co-wrote and starred in his own Adult Swim television specials, Mr. Neighbor's House in 2016, and Mr. Neighbor's House 2 in 2018. The dark comic series is described as a David Lynch-esque kid's show that plays with the fragmentation of the title character's mind.

In 2020, he began co-hosting the podcast Bald Talk alongside Charlie Sanders, where they interview other fellow balding comedic actors. Huskey has also been a regular on many other comedic podcasts, including Comedy Bang! Bang!, Improv4Humans, and Womp It Up! where he plays the role of Seth Wompler.

== Filmography ==
=== Film ===
Year	Title	Role	Notes
2002	The Bourne Identity	Research tech #3	
2004	Terrorists	Howie	
2007	Superbad	Elementary Principal	
2008	Semi-Pro	White Pants	
2008	Meet Dave	Lieutenant Right Arm	
2008	Step Brothers	Interviewer	
2009	Shrink	Film Executive #1	
2009	Land of the Lost	Teacher	
2009	The Scenesters	Bill	
2009	Taking Chances	Edwin Goosewiite	
2010	Breast Picture	Mitchell	
2011	Fright Night	Rick Lee	
2011	Let Go	Man Passing By	
2013	iSteve	Professor Palladino	
2013	This is the End	Headless Man	
2013	Coffee Town	Manager	
2013	The To Do List	High School Principal	
2013	Tarzan	Mr. Smith (voice)	
2014	Someone Marry Barry	Minister Hagen	
2014	Premature	Principal Hansen	
2014	Neighbors	Bill Wazakowski	
2014	Search Party	Pargo	
2014	A Better You	Ron	Also writer
2015	Manny Pacquiao Becomes a Professional Wrestler	Chet Carmichael	Short film
2016	Neighbors 2: Sorority Rising	Bill Wazakowski	
2016	Opening Night	Lee	
2017	The Disaster Artist	Teller	
2017	Father Figures	Joel	
2018	Taco Shop	Bruce	
2018	A Futile and Stupid Gesture	John Landis	
2018	Ant-Man and the Wasp	Elementary School Teacher	
2019	Mope	Eric	
2021	Sound of Violence	Mr. Bell	
2022	My Butt Has a Fever	Regular-Sized Rudy (voice)	Short film
2022	The Bob's Burgers Movie	Regular-Sized Rudy (voice)	
2022	Beavis and Butt-Head Do the Universe	Richard Wack (voice)	
2023	Helen's Dead	George	
2025	Thinestra	Neils	
2025	Winter Hymns	Dr. Brian Carter	

=== Television ===
Year	Title	Role	Notes
1999–2000	Upright Citizens Brigade	Grim Reaper / Rabbi	2 episodes
2002–2006	Late Night with Conan O'Brien	White Collar Crime Prisoner / Group Leader / Spock	4 episodes
2004	Crossballs: The Debate Show	Various	Also writer
2004–2005	Best Week Ever	Panelist	9 episodes
2005	Damage Control	Various	
2005	As the World Turns	Moe	1 episode
2005	Cheap Seats	Maury Zimbalist / Slider	2 episodes
2008–2009	Free Radio	James Reed	17 episodes
2008–2009	Worst Week	Dr. Royce	2 episodes
2008–2011, 2026	The Onion News Network	Duncan Birch	17 episodes
2008–2016	Childrens Hospital	Chet Mandvanteussen	26 episodes; also writer
2009	Parks and Recreation	Morgan	Episode: "Canvassing"
2009	Glenn Martin, DDS	Peter (voice)	Episode: "From Here to Fraternity"
2010	Conan	TBS Executive	Episode: "Baa Baa Blackmail"
2010–2011	Nick Swardson's Pretend Time	Various Roles	4 episodes
2011	Workaholics	Robbie	Episode: "Piss & Shit"
2011	Happy Endings	Dr. Charles	Episode: "The Girl with the David Tattoo"
2011	House	Dr. Riggin	2 episodes
2011	Curb Your Enthusiasm	Buffet Man	Episode: "Vow of Silence"
2011	Funny or Die Presents	Shits Von Biggenheim	Segment: "Juggalo News"
2012	Hart of Dixie	Eric Sunberg	Episode: "Aliens & Aliases"
2012	Community	Professor Gilbar	Episode: "Curriculum Unavailable"
2012	Burning Love	Hershel	Episode: "Pool Party"
2012	The Newsroom	Jake Watson	Episode: "We Just Decided To"
2012	Breaking In		Episode: "Chasing Amy and Molly"
2012	Sullivan & Son	Health Inspector	Episode: "The Bribe"
2012	Guys with Kids	Bryce	Episode: "Pilot"
2012	The Inbetweeners	Mr. Sutherland	2 episodes
2012	Crash & Bernstein	Coach Vanover	Episode: "Coach Crash"
2012–2013	Animal Practice	Nurse Howard	3 episodes
2012, 2015	Comedy Bang! Bang!	Dr. Klinky von Tankerman / Johnny Tigers	2 episodes
2012–2019	Veep	Leon West	16 episodes
2013	Bad Samaritans	Mel	Episode: "Dog Pound"
2013	How I Met Your Mother	Rand	Episode: "Something New"
2013	Arrested Development	Chorizo Salesman	Episode: "Flight of the Phoenix"
2013	The Goodwin Games	Sleazy Party Dude	Episode: "Welcome Home, Goodwins"
2013	The Goldbergs	Andy Secunda	Episode: "The Ring"
2013	NCIS	Front Desk Clerk, Chevy Chase Lodge	Episode: "Alibi"
2013	For-Profit Online University	FPOU_PROF_300954	TV special
2013–2015	Kroll Show	Various	3 episodes; also writer
2013–present	Bob's Burgers	Regular-Sized Rudy / various characters (voice)	62 episodes
2014	Betas	Lambert	Episode: "Blinded by the Light"
2014	The Neighbors	Professor Clint Vance	Episode: "Man, Actually"
2014	Brooklyn Nine-Nine	Mr. Henders	Episode: "The Apartment"
2014	Suburgatory	Podiatrist	Episode: "I'm Just Not That Into Me"
2014	Legit	Zach	Episode: "Intervention"
2014	Terry the Tomboy	Mayor Destero	TV movie
2014	The Hotwives of Orlando	Alex the Plumber	2 episodes
2014	Newsreaders	Wayne	Episode: "Roswell, New Mexico; Skip Goes to a Wedding"
2014	Selfie	Larry	9 episodes
2015	Last Week Tonight with John Oliver	Doctor	Episode: "Marketing to Doctors"
2015	Big Time in Hollywood, FL	Teacher	Episode: "To Catch a Paparazzi"
2015	The Returned	Glenn	Episode: "Rowan"
2015	The Comedians	Brian from The Seth & Brian Show	Episode: "Orange You the New Black Guy"
2015	BoJack Horseman	Richard Nixon / Security Guard (voice)	Episode: "The Shot"
2015	The Grinder	Albert Krantz	Episode: "Pilot"
2015	The Late Late Show with Craig Ferguson	Carl Thorson	Episode: "Host John Mayer/Andy Cohen/Alison Becker/John Legend"
2015–2018	Another Period	Victor Schmemmerhorn-Fish V	17 episodes
2016	Bajillion Dollar Propertie$	Major Domo Gustav	Episode: "Amir Is Glenn's Mentor"
2016	Preacher	Ted Reyerson	Episode: "Pilot"
2016	Mr. Neighbor's House	Mr. Neighbor	TV special; also creator, executive producer, writer
2016	Son of Zorn	Josh	Episode: "Return of the Drinking Buddy"
2016	Talking Tom & Friends	Director (voice)	Episode: "The Famous Monster"
2016	Fresh Off the Boat	Harvey	Episode: "The Taming of the Dads"
2016–2017	The Real O'Neals	Father Phil	3 episodes
2016–2017	People of Earth	Richard Shenk / Schultz	20 episodes
2017	The Mindy Project	Tim	2 episodes
2017	American Dad!	Veterinarian (voice)	Episode: "A Nice Night for a Drive"
2017	Wet Hot American Summer: Ten Years Later	Bickering Husband	Episode: "Tigerclaw"
2017–2018	New Girl	Merle Streep	4 episodes
2018	A Tale of Two Coreys	Bernie Haim	Television film
2018	The X-Files	Reginald Murgatroid	Episode: "The Lost Art of Forehead Sweat"
2018	This Close	Gus	Episode: "Like I Always Wanted"
2018	For the People	Con Man	Episode: "Pilot"
2018	Mr. Neighbor's House 2	Mr. Neighbor	TV special; also creator, executive producer, writer
2018	Ghost Story Club	Jotham	Episode: "The Troll Kings"
2018	Ghosted	FAA Agent Corliss	Episode: "The Airplane"
2018	Fortune Cookie	Andrew	Episode: "The Uh-Cult"
2019	Splitting Up Together	Dr. Weiss	Episode: "Contact High"
2019	Drunk History	Max Jacobson	Episode: "Drugs"
2020	Medical Police	Chet	2 episodes
2020	Archibald's Next Big Thing	Max (voice)	Episode: "Big Fun Town/New Crackridge"
2020	The George Lucas Talk Show	Himself	Episode: "May the AR Be LI$$ You - Season I: The Phantom Arli$$"
2020–2022	Central Park	Various voices	8 episodes
2021	It's Always Sunny in Philadelphia	Gary	Episode: "2020: A Year In Review"
2022	Pam & Tommy	Albert	Episode: "Destroyer of Worlds"
2022–2023	Beavis and Butt-Head	Various voices	5 episodes
2023	Chicago Med	Walter Crotty	Episode: "Those Times You Have to Cross the Line"
2023	History of the World, Part II	Watergate Spy	Episode: "VII"
2023	Lucky Hank	George Saunders	Episode: "George Saunders"
2023	American Born Chinese	Mr. Larkins	4 episodes
2024	Ghosts	George Appleton	Episode: "Holes Are Dead"
2024	Based on a True Story	Doug	Episode: "Y'all Ready for This?"
2025	The Sex Lives of College Girls	Professor Milton	Episode: "The Rodeo"
