= TSBD =

TSBD may refer to:

- Texas School Book Depository
- The Spoils Before Dying
- Times Square Ball Drop
