= Max Marshall =

Max Marshall may refer to:

- Max Marshall (baseball)
- Max Marshall (singer)
- Max Marshall (writer) (born 1993), American journalist and author
