= El camino de Xico =

- Theatrical release poster
- Directed by: Eric D. Cabello Diaz
- Written by: Enrique Renteria
- Story by: Cristina Pineda
- Produced by: Cristina Pineda; Fernando de Fuentes; José C. García de Letona
- Starring: Verónica Castro; Jay De La Cueva; El Hijo Del Santo; Lila Downs; Randy Ebright; Luis Ángel Jaramillo; Pablo Gama “Mago Gamini”; Enrique Guzmán; Daniel Habif; Alex Lora; Juan Pablo Manzanero; Carla Medina; José Miguel Perez-Porrúa; Elena Poniatowska; Marco Antonio Solís; Víctor Trujillo
- Edited by: Carlos Dayan Motta
- Music by: Magda Rosa Galbán; Juan Antonio Leyva
- Production company: Ánima
- Distributed by: CineCANÍBAL
- Release date: 12 November 2020 (Mexico)
- Running time: 86 minutes
- Country: Mexico
- Language: Spanish
- Box office: $0.1 million

El camino de Xico (released internationally as Xico's Journey) is a 2020 Mexican 2D animated film by Eric D. Cabello Diaz in his directorial debut. The film features a wide ensemble voice cast of various Mexican actors led by Pablo Gama Iturrarán, Verónica Alva, and Luis Angel Jaramillo. Produced by Ánima, it is based on the "Xico" character and was released in theaters on 12 November 2020 in Mexico.

The film was later released on Netflix globally on 12 February 2021.

== Plot ==
A girl, her best friend, and a magical dog named Xico, journey to the mountain to protect it and their hometown from a greedy corporation who is then punished later on.

== Voice cast ==
=== Spanish ===
- Pablo Gama Iturrarán as Xico
- Verónica Alva as Copi
- Luis Angel Jaramillo as Gus
- Verónica Castro as Carmen
- Lila Downs as Nana Petra
- Randy Ebright as Señor Caradura
- Enrique Guzmán as Don Viejo
- Daniel Habif as Don Manuel
- Alex Lora as Tlacuache
- Carla Medina as Lupita
- Elena Poniatowska as Cuca
- José Miguel Pérez-Porrúa Suárez as Previer
- Marco Antonio Solís as Tochtli
- Víctor Trujillo as Venado Azul

=== English ===
- Adan Rocha as Xico
- Lola Raie as Copi
- Diego Olmedo as Gus
- Tonantzin Carmelo as Carmen
- Anita Ortega as Nana Petra
- Miguel Perez as Señor Caradura
- Ruben Garfias as Don Viejo
- Anthony L. Fernandez as Don Manuel
- Dino Andrade as Tlacuache
- Roxana Ortega as Lupita, the mother of Copi
- Norma Maldonado as Cuca
- Gabriel Romero as Previer
- Tony Amendola as Tochtli
- Rene Mujica as Venado Azul

== Release ==
The film was first released theatrically in Mexico on 12 November 2020 by CineCANÍBAL. The film grossed $119,373.

Outside Mexico, Netflix acquired worldwide rights to the film and was released globally on 12 February 2021 on the streaming service.

=== Reception ===
The film received generally mixed to favorable reviews from critics. On Tomatazos, the film has a 100% "Fresh" rating.

John Sooja of Common Sense Media rated the film 3/5, calling it "beautiful and sweet" while criticizing the story.

== Awards and nominations ==
| Year | Award | Category | Nominees | Result |
|---|---|---|---|---|
| 2021 | Quirino Awards | Best Ibero-American Animation Feature Film | Eric Cabello Díaz, Cristina Pineda Antúnez | Nominated |
| 2021 | 8th Platino Awards | Best Animated Film | El camino de Xico | Nominated |
