= Thinestra =

2025 American horror film

- Film poster
- Directed by: Nathan Hertz
- Written by: Avra Fox-Lerner
- Starring: Michelle Macedo; Melissa Macedo; Norma Maldonado; Brian Huskey; Annie Ilonzeh
- Cinematography: Joseph Wesley
- Music by: Thomas Walley; Charlie Laffer
- Production companies: Dogplayer; Mary Ellen Moffat; Hitmaker’s Media; Stay Lucky Studios
- Release date: 2025
- Running time: 90 minutes
- Country: United States
- Language: English

Thinestra is a 2025 American horror film directed by Nathan Hertz in his feature debut. The film stars real-life twins Michelle Macedo and Melissa Macedo (of the musical group Macedo), along with Norma Maldonado, Brian Huskey, Gavin Stenhouse, and Annie Ilonzeh. It premiered at the 2025 Raindance Film Festival.

== Plot ==
Penny (Michelle Macedo), overwhelmed by body image anxiety and trapped in a restrictive diet routine, receives a baggie of illicit diet pills from a model at her photoretouching job. After a humiliating lapse at a Christmas party, she takes the pill labeled “Thinestra.” As she sleeps, her discarded fat violently reshapes into a feral doppelgänger named Penelope (Melissa Macedo).

Penelope begins taking over Penny's life, committing murders and consuming horrific substances while Penny wakes in the bloody aftermath, unsure of what she has done. The film uses horror and dark humor to explore shame, diet culture, and disordered eating.

== Cast ==
- Michelle Macedo as Penny
- Melissa Macedo as Penelope
- Mary Beth Barone as Mary Beth
- Annie Ilonzeh as Demetria
- Brian Huskey as Neils
- Gavin Stenhouse as Josh
- Jared Bankens as Thadeus
- Britt Rentschler as Veronica
- Norma Maldonado as Amanda
- Shannon Dang as Chaela

== Production ==
According to Deadline, filming began in Los Angeles at Stay Lucky Studios, with Hertz directing and Avra Fox-Lerner writing. Producers included Alexandra Lubenova (Dogplayer), Kelly Parker (Mary Ellen Moffat), Hitmaker's Media, and Stay Lucky Studios. Hertz, Joe Wesley, and the Macedo twins served as executive producers.

Hertz described the film as a horror satire that externalizes the “collective shame surrounding food & disorganized eating.”

== Release ==
The film premiered at the 2025 Raindance Film Festival and its plot similarities to The Substance were noted.

== Reception ==
Flickering Myth praised the film's body-horror execution and the dual performances by the Macedo sisters.Cut to the Take highlighted its satire of wellness culture and its emotional undercurrent.
