= The Spoils of Babylon =

American comedy miniseries

- Genre: Comedy
- Created by: Matt Piedmont; Harper Steele (Note: Credited as Andrew Steele; Steele came out as transgender and changed her name in 2022.)
- Written by: Matt Piedmont; Harper Steele
- Directed by: Matt Piedmont
- Starring: Tobey Maguire; Kristen Wiig; Tim Robbins; Jessica Alba; Val Kilmer; Haley Joel Osment; Michael Sheen; Will Ferrell
- Music by: Andrew Feltenstein; John Nau
- Country of origin: United States
- Original language: English
- No. of episodes: 6

Production
- Executive producers: Will Ferrell; Adam McKay; Matt Piedmont; Harper Steele; Nate Young
- Producers: Tobey Maguire; Kristen Wiig
- Cinematography: Giles Dunning
- Editor: David Trachtenberg
- Running time: 23 minutes
- Production company: Funny or Die

Original release
- Network: IFC
- Release: January 9 – February 6, 2014

Related
- The Spoils Before Dying

The Spoils of Babylon is an American comedy miniseries written by Matt Piedmont and Harper Steele, directed by Piedmont, and starring Tobey Maguire, Kristen Wiig, Tim Robbins, Jessica Alba, Val Kilmer, Haley Joel Osment, Michael Sheen, and Will Ferrell. It is a spoof of the epic-scale "TV event" miniseries adapted from bestselling novels (such as Shogun, The Thorn Birds and Rich Man, Poor Man) prevalent on American network television in the 1970s and 1980s.

The miniseries premiered on IFC on January 9, 2014. The series received generally positive reviews from critics. For her performance as Cynthia Morehouse, Wiig was nominated for a Primetime Emmy Award for Outstanding Lead Actress in a Miniseries or a Movie.

== Plot ==
Patriarch Jonas Morehouse shepherds his daughter Cynthia and adopted son Devon from meager beginnings in the oil fields of Texas to powerful boardrooms in New York City. Cynthia and Devon, entwined in undeniable love, stumble through war-torn battlefields, blazing mansions, filthy drug dens and velvet-sheeted bedrooms on their quest for power and influence. Despite Jonas' best efforts to intervene, Cynthia and Devon's merciless love sets into motion a wave of destruction that crashes down on Devon's graceful wife Lady Anne, his daughter Marianne, his colleague and lover Dixie, Cynthia's hen-pecked husband Chet, her evil son Winston, the scheming Generals and far beyond.

The entire miniseries is presented as if it had been a real miniseries, with a fictional backstory of how it took three years to film and was originally 22 hours long. Each episode is framed with its author/director Eric Jonrosh sitting in a restaurant discussing it; the setting and Jonrosh's erratic speech and behaviour therein are in imitation of out-takes from Orson Welles' advertisements for wine and frozen peas.

== Cast ==
- Will Ferrell as Eric Jonrosh, "Author, Producer, Actor, Writer, Director, Raconteur, Bon Vivant, Legend, Fabulist" of the series. Ferrell as Jonrosh also plays Reza the Shah of Iran in the final episode.
- Tobey Maguire as Dirk Snowfield as Devon Morehouse, Jonas's adopted son
- Kristen Wiig as Lauoreighiya Samcake (Jonrosh's ex-wife) as Cynthia Morehouse, Jonas's daughter and Devon's adopted sister.
- Tim Robbins as Sir Richard Driftwood as Jonas Morehouse, an entrepreneur in the oil industry
- Val Kilmer as Bobcat Maccaullie as General Cauliffe, a United States Army general
- Michael Sheen as Christopher Smith as Chet Halner, Cynthia's husband
- Jessica Alba as Dixie Melonworth, a marine biologist and Devon's new love interest.
- Haley Joel Osment as Marty Comanche as Winston Morehouse, Cynthia's evil son
- David Spade as Joseph Sol as Talc Munson
- Steve Tom as Rex Muftee as General Maddoxton
- Jellybean Howie as Gumdrop Howard as Marianne Morehouse
- Molly Shannon as Odessa Dobson as Meredith Sennheiser
- Phillip Wampler as Devon Morehouse (Young)
- Isabella Acres as Cynthia Morehouse (Young)
- Ethan Flower as British Civilian
- Cal Bartlett as Cyrus Mego
- Brian Chapman as News Reporter
- Robert Pike Daniel as Board Member #1
- Carey Mulligan (voice) as Lady Anne York, Devon Morehouse's mannequin wife
- Marc Evan Jackson as Bank Man
- Tony Mirrcandani as Amed
- Al Rossi as Congressman Wilkes

== Production ==
The miniseries began principal photography on June 2, 2013 in Los Angeles.

== Episodes ==
No.	Title	Directed by	Written by	Original release date	US viewers (millions)
1	"The Foundling"	Matt Piedmont	Matt Piedmont & Harper Steele	January 9, 2014	0.440
2	"The War Within"	Matt Piedmont	Matt Piedmont & Harper Steele	January 9, 2014	0.440
3	"Kicking the Habit"	Matt Piedmont	Matt Piedmont & Harper Steele	January 16, 2014	0.155
4	"The Rise of the Empire"	Matt Piedmont	Matt Piedmont & Harper Steele	January 23, 2014	0.208
5	"The Age of the Bastard"	Matt Piedmont	Matt Piedmont & Harper Steele	January 30, 2014	0.151
6	"So Sweet the Bells"	Matt Piedmont	Matt Piedmont & Harper Steele	February 6, 2014	0.077

== Reception ==
On review aggregator website Rotten Tomatoes, the series holds an approval rating of 81% based on 32 reviews, with an average rating of 7.12/10. The site's critical consensus reads, "Kristen Wiig, Will Ferrell and a cast of other famous characters make The Spoils of Babylon a worthy watch for comedy fans, satirizing the classic television melodrama miniseries with hilarious visuals and clever content." On Metacritic, the series has a weighted average score of 69 out of 100, based on 26 critics, indicating "generally favorable reviews".

== Companion series ==
The series was enough of a success for the network to prompt a second Spoils miniseries, The Spoils Before Dying, which debuted on July 8, 2015.
