= Steve Tom =

American actor

- Born: Stephen Wilson Tom; September 20, 1953 (age 72); Killeen, Texas, U.S.
- Occupation: Actor
- Years active: 1991–present

Stephen Wilson Tom (born September 20, 1953) is an American actor best known for hosting the HBO comedy series Funny or Die Presents.

== Career ==
He has guest-starred in a number of television series including Parks and Recreation, Major Crimes, Modern Family, How I Met Your Mother, Drake & Josh, ER, NYPD Blue, Sleeper Cell, Two and a Half Men, The King of Queens, Prison Break, The West Wing, The Spoils of Babylon, The Spoils Before Dying, among other television series. For two seasons, he was the critically acclaimed host of the HBO comedy series Funny or Die Presents.

He also appeared in the feature films Dumb and Dumber To, The Campaign, The Guilt Trip, Seven Pounds, First Daughter, Disney's The Kid, Pulse, Rendition and Transformers: Revenge of the Fallen.

== Filmography ==
=== Film ===
Year	Title	Role	Notes
1994	Law Enforcement Guide to Satanic Cults	Narrator	
1999	One Small Hero	Senator Mann	
2000	Disney's The Kid	Lawyer Bruce	
2000	G-Men from Hell	Psychiatrist	
2003	Confidence	Hamilton-Tan	
2004	First Daughter	Senator Downer	
2005	English as a Second Language	Judge	
2006	Pulse	Male Newscaster #2	
2007	Rendition	Reception Guest	
2008	Seven Pounds	Bone Marrow Doctor	
2011	Life of Lemon	John Thompson	
2011	Pig	Doctor	
2011	Rosewood Lane	Glenn Forrester	
2012	The Campaign	Congressman	
2012	The Guilt Trip	OSH Executive	
2013	iSteve	Don Commodore	
2014	Android Cop	Chief Thompson	
2014	Dumb and Dumber To	Dr. Pinchelow	
2016	Rules Don't Apply	TV Newsman #2	
2018	Trouble Is My Business	Gavron Grozney	
2018	Ghost Light	Elliot Wadsworth	

=== Television ===
Year	Title	Role	Notes
1991, 1992	Silk Stalkings	Anchorman / T.V. Announcer	2 episodes
1992	Highway Heartbreaker	John Willis	Television film
1992	In the Deep Woods	Master of Ceremonies	Television film
1992	Renegade	Crenshaw	Episode: "Eye of the Storm"
1994	Accidental Meeting	Hallman	Television film
1996	Night Stand with Dick Dietrick	Warden Downey Jr.	Episode: "Prison Babes"
1998	The Bold and the Beautiful	Minister	2 episodes
1998	The Young and the Restless	Ben Allen / Steve Allen	2 episodes
1998	The Drew Carey Show	Captain Miller	Episode: "Nicki's Wedding"
1999	Action	Senator	Episode: "Mr. Dragon Goes to Washington"
1999	Providence	Dr. Bauer	Episode: "Home for the Holidays"
2000	The Practice	Leonard Stewart	Episode: "Blowing Smoke"
2000	The Others	Dr. Fine	Episode: "Eyes"
2000	Gilmore Girls	Irate Customer	Episode: "The Lorelais' First Day At Chilton"
2001	Grounded for Life	Business Man	Episode: "Like a Virgin"
2001	Angel	Stephen Mills	Episode: "Offspring"
2001	Three Sisters	Airplane Captain	Episode: "Three Thanksgivings, One Turkey"
2001	Scrubs	Narrator / Doctor	Episode: "My Own Personal Jesus"
2002	Malcolm in the Middle	Mr. Jacobson	Episode: "Company Picnic: Part 1"
2002	The West Wing	General Hodges	Episode: "The Black Vera Wang"
2002	NYPD Blue	Allen Walker	Episode: "Better Laid Than Never: Part 1"
2003	The King of Queens	Golf Marshal	Episode: "Golden Moldy"
2003	Dragnet	Grimes	Episode: "For Whom the Whistle Blows"
2003	Threat Matrix	News Anchorman	Episode: "Natural Borne Killers"
2004	Summerland	TV Preacher	Episode: "Pilot"
2004	Arrested Development	Board Member	Episode: "The One Where Michael Leaves"
2004	ER	Dr. MacPherson	Episode: "Twas the Night"
2004	Boston Legal	Martin Jeffries	Episode: "A Greater Good"
2005	Las Vegas	Bert Belinsky	Episode: "Tainted Love"
2005	Desperate Housewives	Judge	Episode: "One Wonderful Day"
2005–2006	Commander in Chief	Reporter Steve	6 episodes
2005, 2008	Two and a Half Men	Minister	2 episodes
2006	Windfall	Rodney Calhoun	2 episodes
2006	Drake & Josh	Henry Doheny	Episode: "The Great Doheny"
2006	Sleeper Cell	DHS Under Secretary	Episode: "Fitna"
2006	What About Brian	Judge Payton	Episode: "What About True Confessions?"
2007	Deal with It...	Sherman	Television film
2007	Weeds	Col. Kors	2 episodes
2007	Curb Your Enthusiasm	Board Member #4	Episode: "The N Word"
2007	Without a Trace	Brad Harris	Episode: "Claus and Effect"
2008	Shark Swarm	Donald Grant	Television film
2008	Finish Line	Colin	Television film
2008–2009	Prison Break	Stuart Tuxhorn	5 episodes
2009	Heroes	Steve	Episode: "A Clear and Present Danger"
2009	The Closer	Judge Richwood	Episode: "Identity Theft"
2009	Safety Geeks: SVI	Mr. Giant Provisions	6 episodes
2010	Backyard Wedding	Ben Blake	Television film
2010	Melissa & Joey	Arlan Tepper	Episode: "Up Close & Personal"
2010	The Defenders	Tom Harrison	Episode: "Nevada v. Sen. Harper"
2010–2011	Funny or Die Presents	Ed Halligan	22 episodes
2011	Too Big to Fail	Chris Dodd	Television film
2011	Keeping Up with the Randalls	Boss	Television film
2011	How I Met Your Mother	Kelly's Father	Episode: "The Best Man"
2012	Modern Family	Chip	Episode: "Lifetime Supply"
2012	Drew Peterson: Untouchable	Newspaper Editor	Television film
2012	It's Always Sunny in Philadelphia	Jameson Taft	Episode: "Charlie and Dee Find Love"
2012–2016	Major Crimes	Judge Craig Richwood	8 episodes
2013	NCIS: Los Angeles	Roger Morgan	Episode: "Purity"
2013	A Snow Globe Christmas	Doc Wilson	Television film
2014	The Spoils of Babylon	General Maddoxton	4 episodes
2014	Sweet Surrender	Doctor Gray	Television film
2014	Parks and Recreation	Principal Russell	Episode: "Prom"
2015	The Spoils Before Dying	Chip Donwelly	5 episodes
2015	Alesia: Ground Zero	Orion	8 episodes
2016	Brooklyn Nine-Nine	Kellan Heller	Episodes: "Hostage Situation"
2016	Party Over Here	Rod Morrison	Episode: "Suffragettes"
2017	Trial & Error	Anchor	Episode: "The Case Gets Bigger"
2018	I Love You, America	Scientist 1	Episode: "Steve Schmidt"
2019	NCIS	George Ashley Green	Episode: "Toil and Trouble"
2019	The Room Actors: Where Are They Now?	Kyle's Dad	Episode: "Take My Card"
2019–2020	Single Parents	Guy McCormick	7 episodes
