= Mr. Neighbor's House =

- Genre: Black comedy
- Created by: Jesse Falcon; Brian Huskey; Jason Mantzoukas
- Written by: Jesse Falcon; Brian Huskey; Jason Mantzoukas
- Directed by: Bill Benz
- Starring: (See Cast)
- Voices of: (See Cast)
- Theme music composer: Mike Phirman; Brian Huskey
- Opening theme: "Mr. Neighbor's House", performed by Brian Huskey
- Ending theme: "Mr. Neighbor's House" (Instrumental)
- Country of origin: United States
- Original language: English
- No. of episodes: 2

Production
- Executive producers: Rob Corddry; Jesse Falcon; Brian Huskey; Jason Mantzoukas; Mark Costa (Note: executive producer for Alive and Kicking, Inc.); Keith Crofford (Note: executive producer for Williams Street); Walter Newman
- Producers: Inman Young (Special 1); Erin Owens (Special 2)
- Cinematography: Carl Herse (Special 1); Barry Elmore (Special 2)
- Editors: Ali Greer (Special 1); Stacy Moon (Special 2)
- Running time: 21 minutes approx.
- Production companies: The Corddry Company; Mantzoukas / Marimacha; El Zombie, Inc.; Alive and Kicking, Inc.; Williams Street

Original release
- Network: Adult Swim
- Release: December 2, 2016 – June 24, 2018

Mr. Neighbor's House is a series of TV specials created by Brian Huskey, Jason Mantzoukas, and Jesse Falcon. It is a parody of Mister Rogers' Neighborhood and premiered on December 2, 2016 on Adult Swim. The puppets for the characters were created by Viva la Puppet. The specials are produced by Alive and Kicking, Inc.

A second special, Mr. Neighbor's House 2, premiered on June 24, 2018.

== Plot ==
Mr. Neighbor's House is a dark parody of an educational television show that takes place in Neighbortown and in the mind of a mental patient named Jim who hasn't said a word in seven years.

== Cast ==
=== Live actors ===
- Brian Huskey as Mr. Neighbor/Jim
- Mary Holland as Ms. Jen Lady, Nurse Mary (special #1 and 2), Patient (special #2)
- Nick Kroll as Photo Joe (special #1)
- Jon Daly as Demon #1 (special #1)
- Steve Agee as Demon #2 (special #1)
- Marc Evan Jackson as Aubrey Johnson (special #2), Doctor (special #2), Patient #2 (special #2)
- David Theune as Ice Cream Bruce (special #2), Patient #3 (special #2)
- Jerry Minor as Detective (special #2)
- Seth Morris as Jim's Father (special #2)
- Colleen Smith as Jim's Mother (special #2)
- Gil Ozeri as Wolfe (special #2)
- Meg Delancy as Scarlett (special #2)
- Jean Villepique as Cindy (special #2)
- Victoria Grace as Cassidy (special #2)
- Joey McIntyre as Game Show Host (special #2)
- Amari O'Neil as Ricky (special #2)
- Nathan Arenas as Evan (special #2)
- Jenna Davis as Ingrid (special #2)
- Isabella Day as Fiona (special #2)
- Chris Palermo as Mr. Neighbor (stunt double)

=== Puppeteers ===
- Jonathan Kidder as Duff and Daisy (special #2)
- Bruce Lanoil - Demon #3 (special #1), Officer Policecop (special #1)
- Adrian Rose Leonard - Buddy
- Colleen Smith - Donna the Mystic (special #1), Floral Handbag (special #1)
- Michelle Zamora - Friendly Ghost (special #1), Grandma Wrinkles (special #1), Creeper (special #2)

== Episodes ==
No.	Title	Original release date	U.S. viewers (millions)
1	Mr. Neighbor's House	December 2, 2016	N/A
Mr. Neighbor invites his friends to his "31st annual 5th birthday party" like his roommate Buddy, the librarian Ms. Jen Lady, the baker Chef Bread, the mailman Photo Joe, Donna the Mystic, King Id, Queen Super Ego, Spaghetti Face, Officer Policecop, Friendly Ghost, Grandma Wrinkles, a Cheerleader, the two-headed Duff and Daisy, Dying Wizard, Ice Cream Bruce, Scarf Monster, Devon, Carl, and Cat Bird. Due to traumatic events involving his mother walking out on his father and never returning, Mr. Neighbor begins to have a psychological breakdown.
2	Mr. Neighbor's House 2	June 24, 2018	0.517
After Mr. Neighbor admits the truth that he didn't like Chef Bread's cooking that set off events that affected Buddy, Jen Lady, Ice Cream Bruce, Scarf Monster, and Duff and Daisy, his real world counterpart Jim who has not spoken in 7 years at a mental hospital goes through various TV satires in his mind that revolves around a secret that involves a fire and his late brother Kenny.

== Premiere ==
Mr. Neighbor's House premiered on December 2, 2016 at midnight on Adult Swim. On October 21, 2016, Brian Huskey, who plays the role of Mr. Neighbor, posted a trailer for the special on YouTube to anticipate the special's premiere.
