= Spencer Brown (musician) =

American DJ

- Born: Onoforio Spencer Jeffrey Bruno; January 1, 1994 (age 32); Los Gatos, California, U.S.
- Origin: San Francisco, California, U.S.
- Genres: Progressive house, techno, deep house
- Occupations: DJ, record producer
- Years active: 2014–present
- Labels: Anjunabeats; Anjunadeep; Bedrock; diviine; Factory 93; Global Underground; Higher Ground; Mau5trap; PRMD
- Website: www.spencerbrown.live

Onofrio Spencer Jeffrey Bruno, professionally known as Spencer Brown, is an American electronic dance music artist, producer, and DJ. He has released three continuous mix albums, 'Illusion of Perfection' (2018), 'Stream of Consciousness' (2020), and 'Equanimity" (2023) and has charted at the top of the Beatport charts for progressive house, house, techno, trance, and deep house.

He is known for his collaborations with John Digweed, deadmau5, and Above & Beyond.

== Early life and education ==
Brown was born in Los Gatos, CA. Around age 12, he started DJing and producing his own music, motivated by his dislike of the music selection at school parties. He then moved to Dallas, TX, where he formed a band with future author Max Marshall. He graduated with distinction in 2016 in Electrical & Computer Engineering with a minor in Computer Science from Duke University⁣ – ⁣Pratt School of Engineering, where he wrote his thesis on omnidirectional speakers.

== Career ==
Brown got his first break when Avicii signed him to his label for his "Chalice EP" on LE7ELS in 2014. He made his live debut opening for Avicii at the Hollywood Bowl in 2013. Thereafter, he toured North America, opening for Avicii's True Tour. After graduating from Duke University, his career picked up pace, when he continued touring and releasing music with world-known DJs like Above & Beyond and deadmau5. In a few years, Brown saw support from some of dance music's biggest international acts, including Calvin Harris, Armin van Buuren, Avicii, Sasha, FISHER, and Pete Tong.

Brown released his debut studio album, presented in mixed format, titled 'Illusion of Perfection' on May 11, 2018. His dislike of radio edits inspired his decision to create a mixalbum. He released his second album, also presented in mixed format, called 'Stream of Consciousness' on January 31, 2020. Collaborators included label mates Ben Böhmer, Marsh, and Qrion. Both albums became number one on the iTunes Dance charts and presented Brown with international headline tours. In 2021, Spencer was signed by Sasha to his Last Night on Earth imprint and to Insomniac's newly established Factory 93 label imprint, further establishing his reputation in the global house and techno scene.

Brown launched his own label, diviine, in 2022, with support from Eric Prydz. John Digweed began playing Brown's releases that year, and the two began to collaborate soon after. In 2023 he released 'Equanimity' and began a 61-show headlining tour across the Americas, Europe, and Asia. In 2024, Brown released music on Bedrock and Global Underground and began a residency of open-to-close shows at Stereo Montreal. In 2025 he released his first Balance mix, in addition the single 'Offsides' with Diplo's Higher Ground.

== Personal life ==
Brown is openly gay; he came out publicly in June 2020, although he had confided in friends six years earlier. Being in the closet had led to depression and illness which he credits the dance music community for helping him recover, "I've transformed from a self-hating, anxiety-ridden boy to a self-loving, grateful man. I'm learning to transform my OCD into something more productive—like perfecting my mixdowns and sound design. I'm discovering ways to pass on the support I found in the dance music community, and I'm finding so much to be thankful for."

== Discography ==
=== Studio albums ===
Title	Details	
Title	Details	Notes
Illusion of Perfection	Release: May 11, 2018; Label: Anjunabeats; Format: Digital download	#1 on iTunes Dance
Stream of Consciousness	Release: January 31, 2020; Label: Anjunabeats; Format: Digital download	#1 on iTunes Dance
Equanimity	Release: September 29, 2023; Label: diviine; Format: Digital download	

=== Singles / EPs ===
- Chalice / Double Down EP – 2014
- Jaboom / Mirek EP – 2014
- Taking My Time – 2016
- Wannamaker - 2016
- Vernal EP – 2017
- Embarcadero EP – 2017
- Embarcadero EP (The Remixes) – 2017
- Downpour EP – 2017
- No Going Back (with ALPHA 9 a.k.a. ARTY) – 2018
- Illusion of Perfection EP pt. 1 – 2018
- Illusion of Perfection EP pt. 2 – 2018
- Illusion of Perfection EP pt. 3 – 2018
- Windows 95 on Acid EP – 2018
- Long Way From Home (with Above & Beyond) – 2018
- Star Allies (with Raito) – 2019
- Sapporo EP (with Qrion) – 2019
- Gatekeeper EP (with ilan Bluestone) – 2019
- Womaa (with Wilt Claybourne) - 2020
- Stream of Consciousness EP pt. 1 - 2020
- Stream of Consciousness EP pt. 2 - 2020
- Phases (with Ben Böhmer) - 2020
- Ariel / Afterlife EP (with ALPHA 9) - 2020
- Spiderman on Ambien / Stairs - 2020
- Santorini (with Tony McGuinness from Above & Beyond - single from Anjunadeep Explorations 17) - 2021
- Thanks, Guy - 2021
- I Was Too Young For 90s Raves EP - 2021
- Forbidden Flow / 18 Minute Loop - 2022

=== Remixes ===
- Henrik B, Niklas Gustavsson, Peter Johansson - Echoes (Spencer Brown Remix) - 2013
- Boom Jinx & Meredith Call - The Dark (Spencer Brown Remix) - 2014
- Lazy Rich & Special Features - Beginning of the World (Spencer Brown Remix) - 2014
- Oliver Smith - On The Moon (Spencer Brown Remix) - 2017
- ilan Bluestone ft. Giuseppe De Luca - Frozen Ground (Spencer Brown Remix) - 2017
- Andrew Rayel - Moments (Spencer Brown's Hypnotic Mix) - 2017
- Seven Lions, Jason Ross, Paul Meany - Higher Love (Spencer Brown Remix) - 2017
- Spencer Brown - 5th & Concord (Spencer Brown Club Mix) - 2017
- Above & Beyond ft. Richard Bedford - Northern Soul (Spencer Brown Remix) - 2017
- ilan Bluestone - Will We Remain (Spencer Brown Remix) - 2018
- Gryffin ft. Elley Duhé - Tie Me Down (Spencer Brown's Ibiza Mix) - 2018
- Qrion - 23 (Spencer Brown Remix) - 2019
- deadmau5 - fn pig (ov) [Spencer Brown Remix] - 2019
- Above & Beyond - Sun in Your Eyes (Spencer Brown Remix) - 2021
- Jody Wisternoff, Mimi Page - For Those We Knew (Spencer Brown & Wilt Claybourne Mix) - 2020
- Above & Beyond - Sun in Your Eyes (Spencer Brown Mix) - 2021
- dubspeeka - Geb (Spencer Brown Rework) - 2021
