= Jordan Vogt-Roberts =

American film director

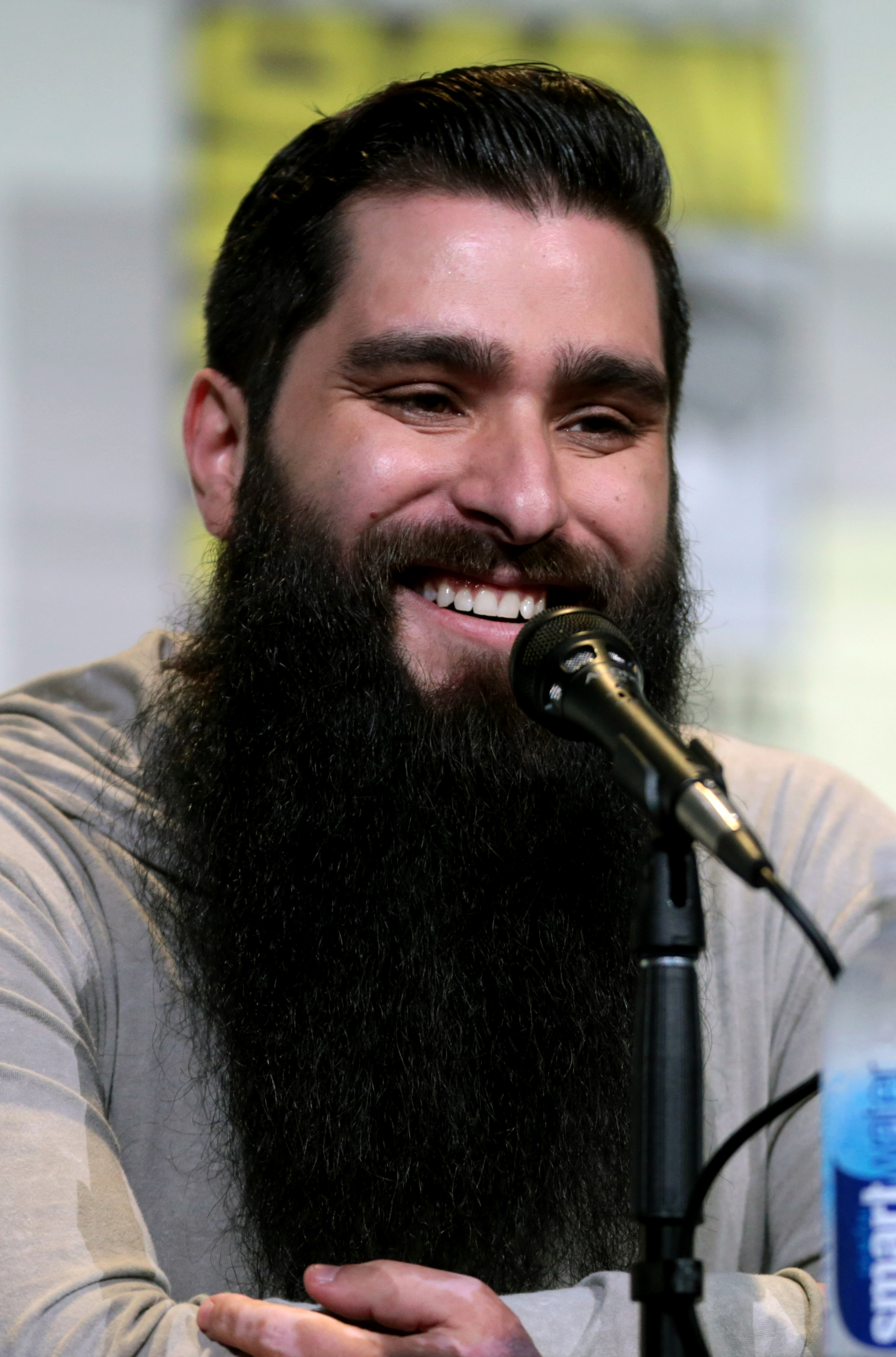
- Jordan Vogt-Roberts at the 2016 San Diego Comic-Con
- Born: Jordan Charles Vogt-Roberts; September 22, 1984 (age 42); United States
- Education: Columbia College Chicago (2006)
- Occupations: Film director; film producer; screenwriter; television director; television producer
- Years active: 2007–present
- Notable work: The Kings of Summer; Kong: Skull Island

Jordan Charles Vogt-Roberts (born September 22, 1984) is an American filmmaker and television show maker. His feature directorial debut, The Kings of Summer, screened at the 2013 Sundance Film Festival. The film also won the Narrative Feature Audience Award at the 2013 Dallas International Film Festival. In 2017, Vogt-Roberts directed the Monsterverse film Kong: Skull Island.

== Career ==
Jordan Vogt-Roberts's first directorial credit was a 2007 documentary, Twit: Robert Buscemi, Live at the Subterranean.

Vogt-Roberts continued his career producing and directing episodes of two web series, Memoirs of a Manchild (2009-2010) and Book Club (2009-2013), and directing most episodes of the web series Single Dads (2009-2011).

After turning an episode of Memoirs of a Manchild into the short film Mint in a Box (2009), in 2010, he wrote and directed the short film Successful Alcoholics. The film screened at the Sundance Film Festival, the SXSW Film Festival, the AFI Fest and 30 other film festivals.

Vogt-Roberts went on to direct Comedy Central's Mash Up, as well as episodes of Funny or Die Presents, MTV's Death Valley and FX's You're the Worst.

Vogt-Roberts's feature film debut, The Kings of Summer, was screened at the Sundance Film Festival and the Cleveland International Film Festival, and won the Narrative Feature Audience Award at the 2013 Dallas International Film Festival.

He went on to direct Kong: Skull Island in 2017, which grossed over $565 million at the global box office.

Vogt-Roberts was announced to direct a film based on the Metal Gear series for Sony Pictures in 2014. In a 2017 interview, Vogt-Roberts repeatedly expressed his passion for video games, and recounted his meeting with Metal Gear creator Hideo Kojima to discuss the making of the film. In Kong: Skull Island, a boat bears the name Gray Fox as a homage to the character of the same name. By April 2026, he was no longer attached to the project with Zach Lipovsky and Adam Stein announced as the new directors.

Vogt-Roberts was to direct the pilot of The Walking Dead: World Beyond, but was replaced with Magnus Martens, who previously directed for Fear the Walking Dead. The change in directors was a result of the production going in a different direction; Vogt-Roberts still contributed to the first episode.

In 2018, it was announced that Vogt-Roberts would direct a miniseries adaptation of the 2014 book Console Wars, with Seth Rogen and Evan Goldberg executive producing the series and Paramount+ distributing it.

In 2021, it was announced that Vogt-Roberts would direct a live action adaptation of Gundam produced by Legendary Entertainment. By October 2024, he was no longer involved with the project.

Vogt-Roberts appeared in a cameo role in the 2026 film Godzilla Minus Zero.

== Personal life ==
Vogt-Roberts is Jewish. He was born in the United States and grew up in the Greater Detroit area. He moved to Arizona at 14 but went back to Royal Oak, Michigan his senior year to graduate with his hometown friends. He graduated from Dondero High School in 2003 and later Columbia College Chicago in 2006.

On September 11, 2017, Vogt-Roberts was brutally attacked while living in Ho Chi Minh City. After investigating the case with GQ journalist Max Marshall, Vogt-Roberts identified his attackers and one of the assailants was eventually arrested in India.

In 2017, pornographic entertainer Dana DeArmond accused Vogt-Roberts of kissing her without her consent at a drinks date he set up with her in 2010, a few months after they wrapped work on Mash Up.

== Filmography ==
Film

- The Kings of Summer (2013)
- Kong: Skull Island (2017)

Television

| Year | Title | Notes |
|---|---|---|
| 2011 | Funny or Die Presents | 5 episodes |
| 2011 | Death Valley | 3 episodes |
| 2012 | Mash Up | 8 episodes |
| 2014 | Nick Offerman: American Ham | Stand-up documentary |
| 2014, 2019 | You're the Worst | 8 episodes |
| 2015 | Cocked | Pilot |
| 2024 | Hysteria! | 2 episodes |

Video games

| Year | Title | Role | Notes |
|---|---|---|---|
| 2019 | Death Stranding | The Film Director | Likeness only |

Commercials

- Destiny 2 (2017)
- PlayerUnknown's Battlegrounds (2018)
- Avengers (2020)
