= Long Haired Businessmen =

Comedy series by Funny or Die

Long Haired Businessmen is a comedy series produced by Funny or Die.

It aired between 2013 and 2020 and was acquired by Amazon Prime in 2018.

Long Haired Businessmen has featured cameos by Will Ferrell, Will Forte, J.K. Simmons, and J Mascis.

In October 2024, it was announced that Scott Gairdner was to direct a film adaptation. On October 30th, 2026, Dean Norris posted to his X account that he would be in the film, releasing November 17th of that same year.

== Content ==
The show follows Seth (George Kareman), Kyle (Pat O’Brien), and Kevin (Ben Wietmarschen), "team leaders" at an unnamed corporation, conducting unknown business. The show's main theme is a satirical view on corporate ineptitude and business speak.

== Commentary ==
Maintaining the absurd dynamic is an essential element of the show, the bouffant hairpieces are neither explained; nor even acknowledged. According to Thrillist's Dave Infante, this visual gag reflects the tenor of the show itself – divorced from distinguishing context and unburdened by likable characters. Long Haired Businessmen is able to ruthlessly lampoon corporate culture. Its characters speak in non-stop buzzwords and clichés, and while the dialogue occasionally touches on their personal lives, this mostly serves to underline an absence of self-awareness and detachment from the world at large.
