= List of Funny or Die Presents episodes =

Funny or Die Presents is a half-hour sketch comedy show that spawned from the comedy video website created by Will Ferrell and Adam McKay, Funny or Die. It premiered on HBO on February 19, 2010.

== Series overview ==
Season	Episodes	Originally aired	
Season	Episodes	First aired	Last aired
1	12	February 19, 2010	May 14, 2010
2	10	January 15, 2011	March 18, 2011

== Episodes ==
=== Season 1 (2010) ===
No.	Original air date	Sketches
1	February 19, 2010	Drunk History: Frederick Douglass; Safety Saw; Playground Politics: Africa; Designated Driver Pt. 1; Save the Professor; Derek Waters LOL
2	February 26, 2010	Sleeping With Celebrities; The Slovin & Allen Show; Playground Politics: North Korea
3	March 5, 2010	Casual Sex: A Pregnant Woman's Search for the Ultimate Threesome; Asian Babies; Sleeping With Celebrities; The Amazing Adventures of David & Jennie; Day by Day With Will and Dave; Men of Unquiet Desperation; Space Baby Pt. 1
4	March 12, 2010	Designated Driver Pt.2; Father and Son
5	March 19, 2010	Holdup Pt.1; Drunken History: Nikola Tesla; Put That D... in My Mouth: The Jerry Cordova Story; Drunk Driving Superhero; Totally Crazy
6	March 26, 2010	Casual Sex: A Pregnant Woman's Search for the Ultimate Threesome; One Thousand Cats; Sleeping With Celebrities
7	April 9, 2010	The Slovin & Allen Show; Sleeping With Celebrities; Designated Driver Pt.3; Playground Politics
8	April 16, 2010	Casual Sex: A Pregnant Woman's Search for the Ultimate Threesome; Holdup Pt.2; Magical Balloon
9	April 23, 2010	The Carpet Brothers
10	April 30, 2010	Just 3 Boyz; Holdup Pt. 3; I've Had Some Drinks
11	May 7, 2010	The Amazing Adventures of David and Jennie; Designated Driver Pt.4; Space Baby Pt. 2; Men of Unquiet Desperation; Day by Day
12	May 14, 2010	Holdup Pt. 4; Playground Politics; Morning Prayer with Skott & Behr

=== Season 2 (2011) ===
No.	Original air date	Sketches
13	January 15, 2011	Do You Want to See a Dead Body?; Terrible Decisions-The Drop Off; Reenactments of Actual Conversations From the Ladies Rooms of Hollywood; United States Police Department; Juggalo News; Adam West Hits on You...Hard; Brick Novax's Diary; Terrible Decisions-The Perfect Outfit
14	January 21, 2011	Tijuana Jackson: Life Coach; United States Police Department; Reenactments of Actual Conversations from the Ladies Rooms of Hollywood; Funny or Die Movie of the week: "Paco Dances"; Welcome to My Study
15	January 28, 2011	Do You Want to See a Dead Body?; Brick Novax's Diary; Adam West Hits on You...Hard; John and Will's Animal Choices; The Amazing Adventures of David & Jennie
16	February 4, 2011	It's Gert; Reenactments of Actual Conversations from the Ladies Rooms of Hollywood; Death Hunt Pt.1; Juggalo News; Men of Unquiet Desperation
17	February 11, 2011	Tijuana Jackson: Life Coach; Death Hunt Pt. 2; Brick Novax's Diary; Welcome to my Study
18	February 18, 2011	Lady Refs Pt.1; Do You Want to See a Dead Body?; The Burn Unit; Sticky Minds
19	February 25, 2011	Tijuana Jackson: Life Coach; Juggalo News; Lady Refs Pt. 2; Adam West Hits on You...Hard; Terrorist on Flight 77
20	March 4, 2011	Do You Want To See a Dead Body?; Lady Refs Pt. 3; Reenactments of Actual Conversations from the Ladies Rooms of Hollywood; Body Boys: Legend of the Pipers; Juggalo News; Boobie
21	March 11, 2011	Brick Novax's Diary; Lady Refs Pt. 4; Jeff Baker: Junior College Professor; Crazy Town; Welcome To My Study
22	March 18, 2011	United States Police Department; The Terrys; Baby Boss
