= The Spoils Before Dying =

- Created by: Matt Piedmont; Harper Steele (Note: Credited as Andrew Steele; Steele came out as transgender and changed her name in 2022.)
- Written by: Matt Piedmont; Harper Steele
- Directed by: Matt Piedmont
- Starring: Will Ferrell; Michael Kenneth Williams; Kristen Wiig; Haley Joel Osment Bérénice Marlohe
- Country of origin: United States
- Original language: English
- No. of episodes: 6

Production
- Producers: Will Ferrell; Adam McKay; Matt Piedmont; Harper Steele; Nate Young
- Production company: Funny or Die

Original release
- Network: IFC
- Release: July 8 – July 10, 2015

The Spoils Before Dying is an American comedy miniseries written by Matt Piedmont and Harper Steele, and directed by Piedmont. It stars Will Ferrell, Michael Kenneth Williams and Kristen Wiig. The miniseries premiered on July 8, 2015, on the American cable channel IFC. A follow-up to the miniseries The Spoils of Babylon, The Spoils Before Dying follows a 1950s jazz pianist-turned-private eye who becomes embroiled in a murder investigation.

== Cast ==
- Will Ferrell as Eric Jonrosh (the author of The Spoils Before Dying) who portrays J. Edgar Hoover
- Michael Kenneth Williams as Rock Banyon, a 1950s jazz pianist-turned-private eye
- Kristen Wiig as Lauoreighiya Samcake (Jonrosh's ex-wife) who portrays Delores O’Dell
- Haley Joel Osment as Marty Comanche who portrays Alistair St. Barnaby-Bixby-Jones
- Michael Sheen as Christopher Smith who portrays Kenton Price
- Steve Tom as Chip Donwelly
- Marc Evan Jackson as Kermit Biggs
- Maya Rudolph as Fresno Foxglove
- Kate McKinnon as Dallas Boudreaux
- Tim Meadows as Gary Dunhill
- Chris Parnell as Bebop Jones
- Emily Ratajkowski as Agent Day
- Bérénice Marlohe as Beatrice
- Andy Daly as Artie Mann
- Peter Coyote as Dizzy The Cat
- Chin Han as Salizar Vasquez Deleon
- Molly Shannon as Odessa Dobson who portrays Tricksy the bartender

== Episodes ==
No.	Title	Directed by	Written by	Original release date	US viewers (millions)
1	"Murder in B Flat"	Matt Piedmont	Matt Piedmont & Harper Steele	July 8, 2015	0.14
2	"Blues for Barnaby"	Matt Piedmont	Matt Piedmont & Harper Steele	July 8, 2015	0.11
3	"That's Jazz"	Matt Piedmont	Matt Piedmont & Harper Steele	July 9, 2015	0.06
4	"Fear Steps In"	Matt Piedmont	Matt Piedmont & Harper Steele	July 9, 2015	0.03
5	"The Trip Trap"	Matt Piedmont	Matt Piedmont & Harper Steele	July 10, 2015	0.08
6	"The Biscuit Eaters"	Matt Piedmont	Matt Piedmont & Harper Steele	July 10, 2015	0.08
