= Harper Steele =

American writer (born 1961)

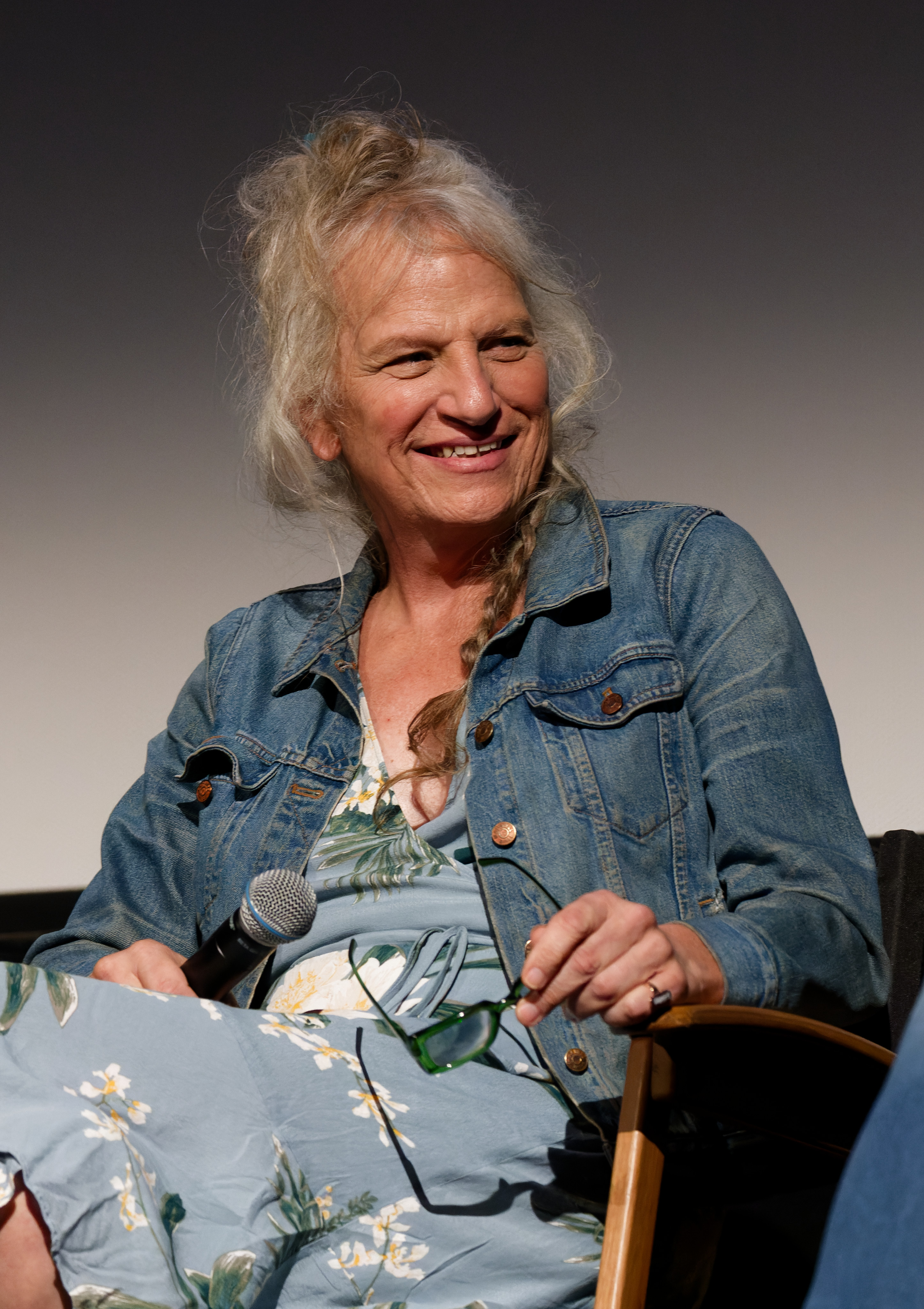
- Steele at the 2024 Telluride Film Festival
- Born: Andrew Steele; August 1961 (age 64–65); United States
- Citizenship: United States
- Writing career
- Language: English
- Genres: Comedy, television
- Notable works: Saturday Night Live; Will & Harper
- Notable awards: Emmy Award

Harper Steele (formerly Andrew Steele; born August 1961) is an American writer. She starred in the 2024 documentary Will & Harper with actor Will Ferrell. She worked at Saturday Night Live from 1995 to 2008, serving as head writer from 2004 through 2008. Her accolades include one Primetime Emmy Award from four nominations.

== Early life and education ==
Steele grew up in Iowa City, a child of two University of Iowa professors. She attended Iowa City High School, graduating in 1979. She has described herself in high school as "a C-minus student who couldn't spell." She tended to hang out with outsiders, only feeling comfortable at school in her senior year, when she became involved with the theater department. She graduated from the University of Iowa with an English degree.

== Career ==
Steele started working at Saturday Night Live the same week as Will Ferrell in 1995. She worked there for 13 years from 1995 to 2008, including four as head writer. She was nominated for four Emmy Awards, winning one in 2002. She has described her own political and comedic viewpoints as "purple-haired woke," saying, "[T]here isn't a trans person I’ve met who doesn't have a sense of humor about themselves." She believes that humor can "make a real positive difference in the world." Jimmy Fallon called her "one of the funniest people I think I've ever met in my lifetime.

Steele left SNL for Funny or Die in 2008 just after they announced their partnership with HBO. Her role was as creative director for Funny or Die and executive producer of HBO's Funny or Die Presents. She produced the first dozen half-hour Funny or Die shows that were shown on HBO, with her writing used in nine of them. She also co-wrote Casa de mi padre with Eva Maria Peters, The Ladies Man with Tim Meadows and Dennis McNicholas, and Eurovision Song Contest: The Story of Fire Saga with Ferrell.

After Steele came out to Ferrell about her gender transition in 2022, Ferrell decided he should learn more about the trans community as he was not very knowledgeable. The two decided to undertake and document a cross-country road trip as they processed this change and what it meant for their friendship. Steele had said that, although she had always loved road trips, she felt nervous about traveling alone through small towns and conservative states as a trans woman, noting that anti-trans legislation in many US states could inhibit her ability to use a restroom or even cause her to be legally discriminated against. Steele and Ferrell visited Steele's hometown, including her high school and a local bar she used to frequent.

Of the resulting film Will & Harper, Steele said, "I'm very proud of it. I'm scared of... the aftermath of it coming up, but I'm very proud." The film premiered at the 40th Sundance Film Festival in January 2024 and was nominated for a people's choice award at the Toronto International Film Festival.

Steele served as executive producer for the documentary What Will I Become, which explores transmasculine youth and suicide. The film, co-directed by Lexie Bean and Logan Rozos and co-produced by ITVS and Deep Dive Films, premieres at the Berlinale film festival in February 2026.

== Personal life ==
Assigned male at birth, Steele began her gender transition in 2022, and came out to her friends in letters. These letters said, in part, "Look, I'm not a very political person, but just by nature of being trans, I'm now a political person in a way. I just ask you as my friends to stand up for me. Do your best to, if I'm misgendered, just speak up on my behalf, that's all I ask." When asked for casting suggestions for her if the Will & Harper documentary became a scripted movie, Steele quipped "I love Hunter Schafer and I feel like I look exactly like her."

== Awards and nominations ==
Awards and nominations received by Harper Steele
Award	Year (Note: Indicates the year of ceremony. Each year is linked to the article about the awards held that year, wherever possible.)	Category	Nominated work	Result	Ref.
Primetime Emmy Awards	2001	Outstanding Writing For A Variety, Music Or Comedy Program	Saturday Night Live	Nominated	
Primetime Emmy Awards	2002	Outstanding Writing For A Variety, Music Or Comedy Program	Saturday Night Live	Won	
Primetime Emmy Awards	2003	Outstanding Writing For A Variety, Music Or Comedy Program	Saturday Night Live	Nominated	
Primetime Emmy Awards	2008	Outstanding Writing For A Variety, Music Or Comedy Program	Saturday Night Live	Nominated	
Primetime Emmy Awards	2014	Outstanding Original Main Title Theme Music	The Spoils of Babylon	Nominated	
