= Funny or Die =

American comedy website/film/TV production company

Funny or Die, Inc.
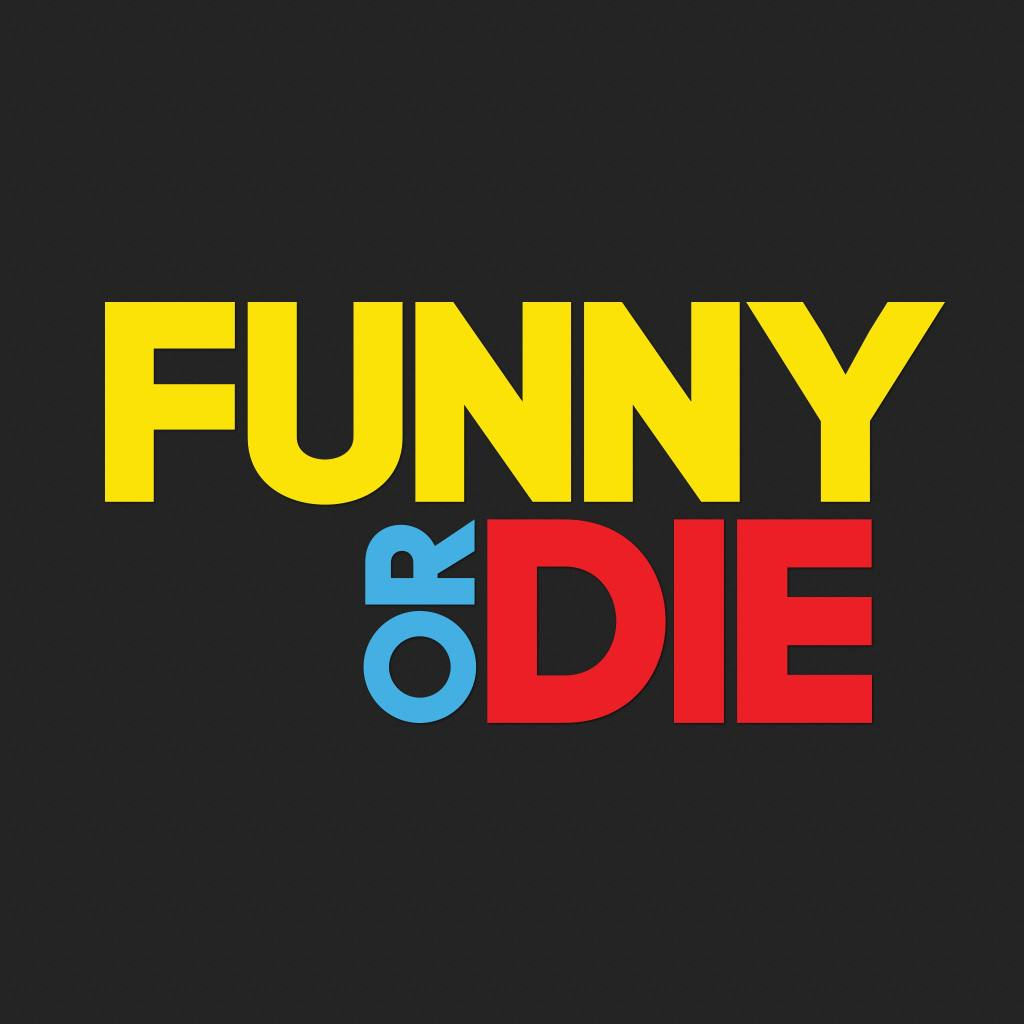
- Type: Private
- Industry: Film; Television; Internet
- Genre: Comedy
- Founded: April 12, 2007; 19 years ago
- Founders: Will Ferrell; Adam McKay; Mark Kvamme; Chris Henchy
- Headquarters: Los Angeles, California, U.S.
- Key people: Mike Farah (CEO)
- Owner: Henry R. Muñoz III
- Website: funnyordie.com

Funny or Die, Inc., is an American comedy video website and production company owned by Henry R. Muñoz III and founded by Will Ferrell, Adam McKay, Mark Kvamme, and Chris Henchy on April 12, 2007. The website contained exclusive material from a regular staff of in-house writers, producers and directors, and occasionally from a number of famous contributors, including Judd Apatow, James Franco, and Norm Macdonald. The associated production company continues to make television shows, including TruTV's Billy on the Street, Comedy Central's @midnight, and Zach Galifianakis' web series Between Two Ferns.

Many videos on the site featured well-known actors and actresses (examples include Don Cheadle, Steve Carell, Charlie Sheen, Ryan Gosling, Patrick Stewart, Daniel Radcliffe, Sophia Bush, Mila Kunis, AnnaSophia Robb, Hilary Duff, Adam West, James Van Der Beek, Jim Carrey, Lance Reddick, Ariel Winter and Selena Gomez). Michael Kvamme, an aspiring young comedian who is also the son of Mark Kvamme, the venture capitalist who funded Funny or Die, came up with a concept for a new kind of comedy site, and the site was developed by Randy Adams. After the site was funded by his father, Michael Kvamme wrote a screenplay for Will Ferrell and founded Global eSports Resources in partnership with the Saudi Arabian Federation of Electronic and Intellectual Sports.

Funny or Die launched on April 12, 2007 with the site's first video, "The Landlord". "The Landlord" has received over 84 million views and features Ferrell confronted by a swearing, beer-drinking two-year-old landlord. In June 2007, they received venture capital funding from Sequoia Capital, and in June 2008, they announced a partnership with HBO. On August 3, 2016, Funny or Die shut down one of its California offices, reducing its headcount by 30% to 95 employees, with the announcement coming just two months after the new CEO, Mike Farah, took office.

Henry R. Muñoz III bought Funny or Die for an undisclosed amount. The acquisition was announced in Variety on May 12, 2021. Muñoz purchased Funny or Die from the company's former stakeholders, which included AMC Networks, WarnerMedia and Sequoia Capital.

== Online presence ==
In its earlier form as a viral-video website, Funny or Die allowed members to vote on videos with the options "Funny" or "Die". Videos received a score based on the percentage of users who voted "Funny". If a video received an 80% or greater "Funny" rating after 100,000 views, it received an "Immortal" ranking. If a video received a 20% or lower "Funny" rating after 1,000 views, it was relegated to the Crypt section of the site.

The Funny or Die staff could also select a rating of "Chosen One", which disabled voting for a video and displayed "Chosen One" instead. As of 2026, the Funny or Die website presents the company primarily as an independent comedy studio, and its library page states that its archive is being reconstructed.

== Television and movie productions ==
Funny or Die expanded to include a television and film production company in 2011.

=== Shows ===
==== Between Two Ferns ====
Between Two Ferns with Zach Galifianakis is an Emmy Award-winning comedy series featured on Funny or Die. Galifianakis interviews various celebrities on a low budget set, decorated by a pair of potted ferns. The series often involves interruptions for product promotions and musical guests. The Lonely Island's "Spring Break Anthem" music video was embedded into an episode with James Franco and featured actor Edward Norton.

Galifianakis has interviewed the likes of Brad Pitt, Justin Bieber, Jennifer Lawrence, Samuel L. Jackson, Richard Branson, and President Barack Obama. Galifianakis interviewed President Barack Obama during the launch of the United States health insurance exchange website. The video was released on March 11, 2014 and garnered over 32 million views.

==== Billy on the Street ====
Funny or Die's Billy on the Street is a half-hour comedy game show hosted by Billy Eichner. The show's producers include Anna Wenger, Mike Farah and Billy Eichner. Billy on the Street premiered on Fuse TV on December 18, 2011. On October 8, 2015 the show began airing on tru TV. Eichner quizzes people on the streets of New York on pop culture in exchange for cash and prizes. Many episodes feature a special guest and celebrities Lindsay Lohan, Anne Hathaway, Neil Patrick Harris, and Olivia Wilde have made appearances on the show.

In 2013, Eichner received a Daytime Emmy Award nomination for Outstanding Game Show Host. The series wrapped its third season on May 14, 2014.

==== Drunk History ====
Drunk History is a comedy series on Comedy Central that was released on Funny or Die in December 2007. The show originated as a web series created by Derek Waters and Jeremy Konner. The show features a drunken narrator who attempts to recount an event from American history. The actors are played by celebrity guest stars who lip-sync the narrator's dialogue.

Due to their general drunkenness the narrators are unable to accurately discuss the historical events and oftentimes make up and embellish aspects of the story. Guests include Jack Black, Michael Cera, Bill Hader, Nick Offerman, Winona Ryder, Chris Parnell, Kristen Wiig, Luke Wilson, and Jason Schwartzman.

==== Gay of Thrones ====
Gay of Thrones is a comedy web series hosted by Jonathan Van Ness in which he and a guest recap the most recent episode of Game of Thrones in Van Ness' hair salon. Its first episode, recapping the first two episodes of season 3 of Game of Thrones, was released in April 2013 and has covered each episode from then until the finale in May 2019. Guests have included Alfie Allen, Tiffany Haddish, Kumail Nanjiani and Lena Headey.

==== @midnight and @after midnight ====
@midnight was a late night comedy panel show hosted by Chris Hardwick and produced by Funny or Die. The show debuted on Comedy Central on October 21, 2013. The show features three guest comedians that respond to different social media postings and pop culture references of the day, including responses to actual tweets on Twitter, Craigslist ad postings, and comments on Reddit.

@Midnight used social media as a platform to engage with their fans. The show created hashtags, including #HashtagWars and #SpookyCelebs, that were used by fans to submit their own responses to the game on Twitter.

A CBS revival of the series, entitled @fter midnight, was launched on January 17, 2024 and is hosted by Taylor Tomlinson. The show retains some previous segments from @Midnight, and introduces some new games that lean more into improv and physical comedy. The series finale aired on June 13, 2025.

==== The Spoils of Babylon ====
The Spoils of Babylon is a comedy miniseries that aired on January 9, 2014 on IFC. The show was created and written by former Saturday Night Live writers Matt Piedmont and Harper Steele. Piedmont also directed the series. The series stars Will Ferrell, Kristen Wiig, Tobey Maguire, Jessica Alba, Haley Joel Osment, Tim Robbins, Michael Sheen, Carey Mulligan and Val Kilmer.

Ferrell plays Eric Jonrosh, a fictional author whose novel is being adapted for TV. The Spoils of Babylon novel follows a wealthy oil tycoon's family, the Morehouses. Robbins plays Jonas Morehouse, the patriarch of the family. Wiig and Maguire play Cynthia and her adopted brother Devon.

IFC and Funny Or Die adapted Jonrosh's first novel, The Spoils Before Dying into another miniseries, which aired on July 8, 2015.

==== Throwing Shade ====
Throwing Shade is a podcast hosted by Erin Gibson and Bryan Safi, that addresses topics such as mainstream pop culture, women's rights and gay rights. In 2011 Gibson and Safi created the Throwing Shade podcast after InfoMania was cancelled and in 2013 Funny or Die began filming the podcast on a set, and airing the recordings of the podcast on its website.

The podcast occasionally has famous guests, including Cheyenne Jackson and Dustin Lance Black. Throwing Shade won a Podcast Award for Best GLBT Podcast in both 2012 and 2013.

The duo have recorded 80 videos since signing on with Funny or Die.

==== Tween Fest ====
Tween Fest is an eight-episode Funny or Die series starring John Michael Higgins, Joey King, Drew Tarver, Arden Cho, and Lou Wilson that follows a two-weekend outdoor festival in the middle of the desert where all the acts are internet stars. The show launched on August 3, 2016 on the streaming service go90. Tween Fest was created by Nick Ciarelli and Brad Evans, was directed by Scott Gairdner, and features Jane Lynch, Tim Meadows, Chris Parnell, David Koechner, Dave (Gruber) Allen, Josh Fadem and more in supporting and guest-starring roles.

==== Other shows ====
- Funny or Die Presents (2010–2011, HBO)
- Jon Benjamin Has a Van (2011, Comedy Central)
- Brody Stevens: Enjoy It! (2013, Comedy Central)
- Long Haired Businessmen (2011–2020, Amazon Prime)
- American Muscle (2014, Discovery)
- Funny or Die Presents: America's Next Weatherman (2015, TBS)
- The Gorburger Show (2015, HBO; 2017, Comedy Central)
- The Chris Gethard Show (2015–2018; Fusion TV, TruTV)
- Brockmire (2017–2020, IFC)
- Funny or Die's High Science (2023, HBO Max)

=== Pilots ===
- What's Going On? with Mike Mitchell (2011, FX)

=== Specials ===
==== Between Two Ferns: A Fairytale of New York ====
A 2012 special aired on Comedy Central with Zach Galifianakis.

==== Sarah Silverman: We Are Miracles ====
On November 23, 2013, HBO presented a special in association with Funny Or Die titled, "Sarah Silverman: We Are Miracles" featuring stand-up by comedian Sarah Silverman. During her hour-long set, Silverman made jokes about rape, religion, and her personal insecurities.

The special received a 2014 Emmy Award nomination for Outstanding Variety Special and Silverman's writing earned her an Emmy win for Outstanding Writing For a Variety Special. Record label Sub Pop, went on to release the special on vinyl, CD, and through digital download.

==== Jerrod Carmichael: Love At the Store ====
Funny Or Die produced a special featuring comedian Jerrod Carmichael for HBO which aired on October 4, 2014. During the 70-minute special, Carmichael covers topics including poverty and wealth, controversial artists, female empowerment, and crime and race.

Jerrod Carmichael: Love at the Store was directed by Spike Lee and was filmed at The Comedy Store in Los Angeles. Carmichael chose the location because it was the first venue he performed in back in 2008.

==== Tig Notaro: Boyish Girl Interrupted ====
Funny Or Die produced a comedy special for HBO featuring comedian Tig Notaro. Tig Notaro: Boyish Girl Interrupted premiered on HBO on August 22, 2015. Notaro promoted the special by walking the streets of Los Angeles to bring awareness to a giant billboard of her face.

During the HBO special Notaro talks about her breast cancer diagnosis, her break up with her girlfriend and the death of her mother. Notaro performs the final third of her set topless to expose the scars of her mastectomy to the audience.

==== Ferrell Takes the Field ====
A 2015 special aired on HBO with Will Ferrell.

=== Movies ===
- Tim and Eric's Billion Dollar Movie (2012, co-production with Abso Lutely Productions)
- iSteve (2013, released online via Funny Or Die)
- Donald Trump's The Art of the Deal: The Movie (2016, released online via Funny or Die)
- Between Two Ferns: The Movie (2019, released online on September 20, 2019 via Netflix)
- Impractical Jokers: The Movie (2020, released in theaters) The movie follows the four lifelong friends of Joe Gatto, James "Murr" Murray, Salvatore "Sal" Vulcano, and Brian "Q" Quinn from the hit TV show of Impractical Jokers. The movie was announced on March 7, 2018, when the Impractical Jokers got renewed for a season 8. The Movie began production in the end of April 2018. The film was released in 2020.
- Weird: The Al Yankovic Story (2022, released online on November 4, 2022 via The Roku Channel)

== Funny or Die Presents ==
In June 2008, HBO and Funny or Die announced that HBO had purchased a stake of less than 10% in Funny or Die. With this, Funny or Die will be responsible for developing at least 10 half-hour episodes for HBO, and the companies may organize future comedy tours together. Regarding the agreement, Will Ferrell said, "I don't want to overstate the importance of this deal, but this is the missing link moment where TV and Internet finally merge. It will change the way we as human beings perceive and interact with reality. Okay, I overstated it. But it is an exciting deal."

In August 2008, Funny or Die hired Harper Steele, a thirteen-year veteran of Saturday Night Live, and one of three head writers in recent years, to oversee content production and development for the site and for the HBO partnership.

== Live events ==
=== Funny or Die Comedy Tour ===
In February 2008, Funny or Die launched "Will Ferrell's Funny Or Die Comedy Tour Presented by 'Semi-Pro'", in conjunction with the promotion of the movie Semi-Pro. The tour featured Ferrell, members of the FOD Team and comedians Zach Galifianakis, Demetri Martin, Nick Swardson and Andrea Savage. Adam McKay and Will Arnett served as tour announcers. The eight-city tour hit college campuses in Kansas, Michigan, Ohio, Pennsylvania, Rhode Island, Massachusetts, North Carolina and New York. The tour ran February 4–24, 2008.

=== Funny or Die Oddball Comedy Festival ===
==== 2013 ====
In June 2013 Funny Or Die announced the Oddball Comedy & Curiosity Festival comedy tour partnered with Live Nation The tour was headlined by Dave Chappelle and Flight of the Conchords. The lineup also included Al Madrigal, Kristen Schaal, Brody Stevens, Demetri Martin, John Mulaney, Jim Jefferies, and Hannibal Buress. The tour ran August 23 – September 22, 2013.

==== 2014 ====
In 2014, Funny Or Die continued the Oddball Festival, touring 20 cities across the U.S. from August 8 – September 21. The tour featured comedians Louis C.K., Sarah Silverman, Aziz Ansari, Chris Hardwick, Amy Schumer, and Jim Gaffigan.

==== 2015 ====
The 2015 lineup included Amy Schumer, Aziz Ansari, Anthony Jeselnik, Ashley Barnhill, Bridget Everett, Dave Attell, Donnell Rawlings, Jak Knight, Jay Pharoah, Jeff Ross, Jim Norton, John Mulaney, Katherine Ryan, Mark Normand, Michael Che, Nick Kroll, Nick Thune, Nikki Glaser, Rachel Feinstein, Rory Scovel, Sebastian Maniscalco, Steve Rannazzisi, T.J. Miller, Tim Minchin, Todd Barry, and Tony Hinchcliffe. The tour ran August 28 – October 18, 2015.

=== Treasure Island Music Festival: Blah Blah Blah Comedy Tent ===
Funny Or Die curated a comedy lineup for the 2015 Treasure Island music festival in San Francisco, CA. The Funny Or Die Blah Blah Blah tent featured comedy acts from Tim Heidecker, Jerrod Carmichael, Jonah Ray, Chris Gethard, Jon Dore, Lauren Lapkus, Brian Safi & Erin Gibson, Kate Berlant & John Early, Guy Branum, Michelle Wolf, Max Silvestri, Barry Rothbart, and Jermaine Fowler.

== Political activism ==
Although ostensibly independent of organized politics, site creators Ferrell and McKay are supporters of the Democratic Party and have personal politics that "tend to lean a little left."

Funny or Die has also been responsible for creation of parody videos lampooning California's 2008 traditional marriage initiative, Proposition 8, and taking a pot shot at the National Rifle Association with a video featuring comedian Jim Carrey. The site also worked with television star Alyssa Milano to "leak" a purported sex tape of the actress which was in fact an awareness-raising video on the bloody Syrian Civil War. In July 2013, shortly after the National Security Agency's PRISM surveillance program was first publicized, Sasha Grey starred in a Funny or Die "Sexy NSA Commercial".

=== Obama interview ===
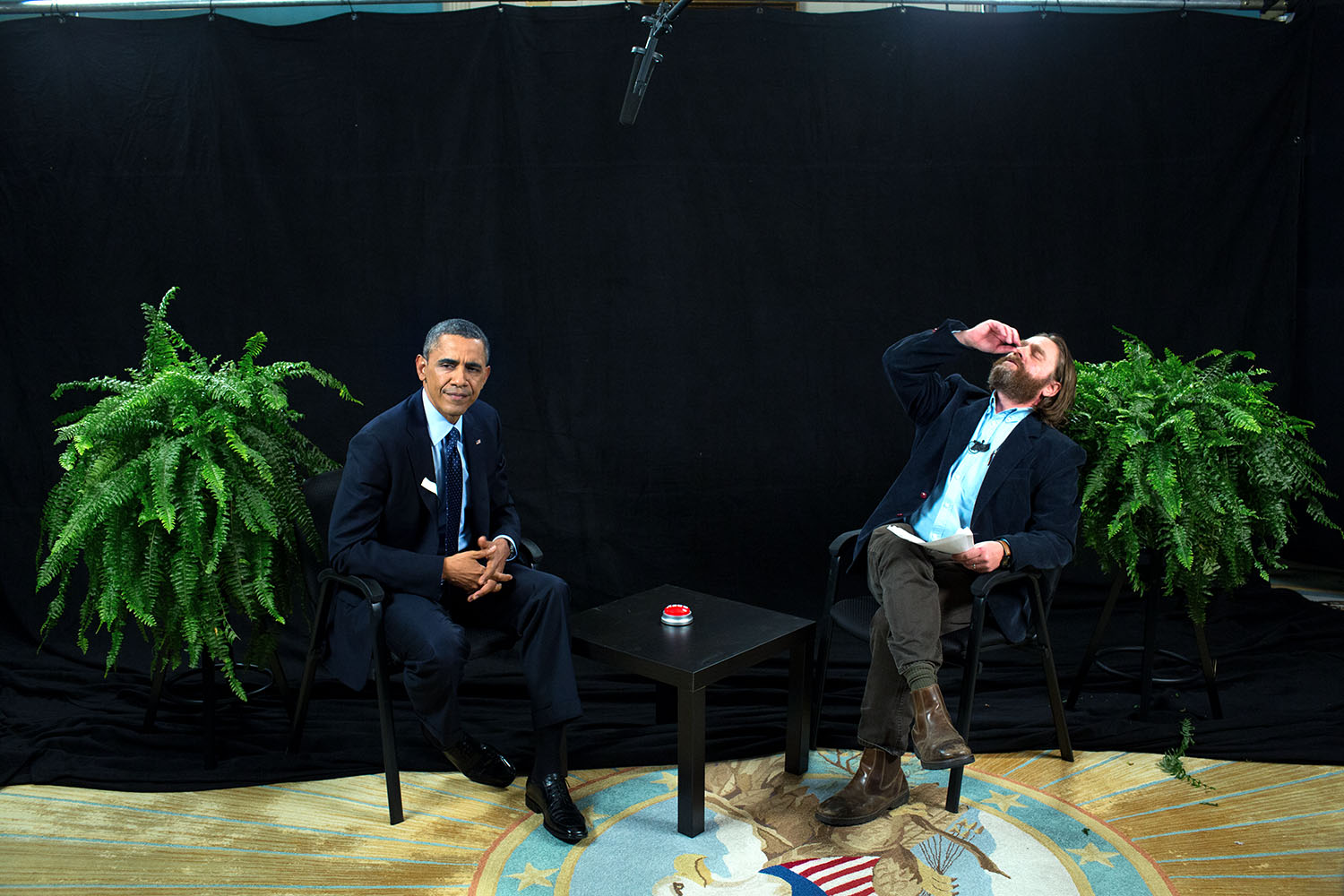
Galifianakis interviewing Obama on Between Two Ferns

On March 11, 2014, Zach Galifianakis interviewed Barack Obama on his show Between Two Ferns with Zach Galifianakis on the website. During the interview, they asked people to sign up for healthcare on the Healthcare.gov site as part of the Affordable Care Act. By the next day, 11 million viewers had watched the video, and more than 890,000 people viewed the website during just that morning.

=== Michelle Obama's Eat Brighter Campaign ===
On February 16, 2015, the First Lady of the United States, Michelle Obama, teamed up with Billy Eichner and Big Bird to promote her health initiative called 'Eat Brighter!' In the episode the trio join at a grocery store in Washington D.C. to play a game titled "Ariana Grande or Eating a Carrot?"

Michelle Obama made an appearance in a Funny Or Die movie trailer for "Snakpocalypse" which was featured on September 2, 2014. The trailer described the events that led to the elimination of a teenage population due to poor food choices offered at their high school. Michelle Obama's Let's Move! campaign supports healthy eating in youth and adults and she appears in the video crunching on a carrot.

=== Kristen Bell & Christina Hendricks For Women's Wage Equality ===
"Mary Poppins Quits" with Kristen Bell was featured on Funny Or Die on July 23, 2014. In the video Mary Poppins played by Kristen Bell sings about increasing minimum wage in order to meet living wage standards.

"Modern Office" with Christina Hendricks was published on August 6, 2014. Christina Hendricks who plays fictional character Joan Harris on AMC's Mad Men gets a new job in a modern office. Hendricks transports her character from the 1960s into a modern office environment. The video insinuates that modern office environments maintain antiquated policies regarding women's roles in the workplace.

=== Prop 8 The Musical ===
In response to 2008 California Proposition 8 ("Prop 8") Funny or Die produced a short musical written by Marc Shaiman and starring Jack Black (as Jesus), John C. Reilly and Neil Patrick Harris satirizing Prop 8.

=== "Free Shez" ===
Funny or Die launched a campaign for the legal defense of Shezanne Cassim, a Minnesota resident who was jailed in Abu Dhabi for allegedly endangering national security by posting a parody video to YouTube. Comedians Patton Oswalt and Tony Hale were subsequently made part of Funny Or Die's effort to raise funds and awareness to "Free Shez." Originally sentenced to a year in prison, in the face of growing public pressure Cassim was released in January 2014 after serving 9 months of his sentence.

=== Jim Carrey NRA Song for Brady Campaign: Cold Dead Hand ===
In March 2013, Funny Or Die created the video, "Cold Dead Hand" starring Jim Carrey as both a country singer and former NRA president, Charlton Heston.

In the video, Carrey is joined by singers portraying Mahatma Gandhi, Abraham Lincoln, and John Lennon, all of whom were assassinated by gunmen, as they perform on Hee Haw, the 1970s CBS variety show.

=== Trump administration ===
Funny or Die posted various videos showing concern over the Trump administration's activities.

== Hoaxes and controversies ==
On March 2, 2014, two promotional videos were released on a YouTube channel supposedly controlled by HUVr Tech, a company claiming to have invented a hoverboard much like those in the Back to the Future film trilogy. The videos included demonstrations of the board by celebrities such as Tony Hawk and Moby. Two days later the project was revealed to be a hoax perpetrated by Funny or Die, after the video's costume designer posted the experience on her online résumé.

== Awards ==
=== Webby Awards ===
Year	Association	Category	Recipient
2011	Webby	Special Achievement: Film & Video Person of the Year	Funny Or Die
2011	Webby	Web: Humor	Funny Or Die
2011	Webby	Best Web Personality / Host	Between Two Ferns w Zach Galifianakis
2011	Webby	Individual Short Or Episode	Between Two Ferns w Zach Galifianakis: Steve Carell
2011	Webby	Online Film & Video: Variety	Between Two Ferns
2011	Webby	Online Film & Video: Variety (People's Voice)	Between Two Ferns
2011	Webby	Best Individual Performance (People's Voice)	Jim Carey in Funny Or Die's Presidential Reunion
2011	Webby	Comedy: Individual Short or Episode (People's Voice)	Justin Bieber Takes Over Funny Or Die
2011	Webby	Comedy: Long Form Or Series (People Voice)	Funny Or Die's Presidential Reunion
2012	Webby	Online Film & Video: Best Individual Performance	President Bush Reacts to Osama Bin Laden's Death with Will Ferrell
2012	Webby	Online Film & Video: Comedy: Long Form Or Series	Drunk History Christmas
2013	Webby	Online Film & Video: Best Individual Performance	Charlize Theron Gets Hacked
2013	Webby	Online Film & Video: Comedy: Individual Short or Episode	Wire: The Musical
2014	Webby	Online Film & Video: Comedy: Best Longform Or Series	Between Two Ferns with Zach Galifianakis: Justin Bieber
2014	Webby	Online Film & Video: Comedy: Best Longform Or Series (People's Voice)	Between Two Ferns with Zach Galifianakis: Justin Bieber
2014	Webby	Web: Humor	Funny Or Die
2015	Webby	Web: Humor	Funny Or Die

=== Primetime Emmy Awards ===
Year	Association	Category	Recipient
2014	Primetime Emmy	Outstanding short format Live-Action Entertainment Program	Between Two Ferns with Zach Galifianakis: President Barack Obama
2015	Primetime Emmy	Outstanding short format Live-Action Entertainment Program	Between Two Ferns with Zach Galifianakis: Brad Pitt
2023	Primetime Emmy Award	Outstanding Music Composition for a Limited or Anthology Series or Movie	Weird: The Al Yankovic Story
2023	Primetime Emmy Award	Outstanding Television Movie	Weird: The Al Yankovic Story
