= Nick Offerman: American Ham =

2014 comedy film by Jordan Vogt-Roberts

- Film poster
- Directed by: Jordan Vogt-Roberts
- Written by: Nick Offerman
- Produced by: Nick Offerman; Julien Lemaitre
- Starring: Nick Offerman; Marc Evan Jackson; Megan Mullally
- Cinematography: Matt Garrett; Ross Riege
- Edited by: Josh Schaeffer; Alex Gorosh; Stacey Schroeder
- Music by: Ryan Miller
- Production companies: Six Two and Even Production
- Distributed by: Netflix
- Release dates: January 23, 2014 (Sundance); December 12, 2014 (United States)
- Running time: 78 minutes
- Country: United States
- Language: English

Nick Offerman: American Ham is a 2014 American stand-up comedy film, directed by Jordan Vogt-Roberts. It is written by the American actor, writer and carpenter, Nick Offerman. The film had its world premiere at the 2014 Sundance Film Festival on January 23, 2014. The special was removed from Netflix in December 2017.

== Plot ==
The film is a live taping of Offerman's one-man show at the Town Hall theater in New York, with a collection of anecdotes, songs and woodworking/oral-sex techniques.

== Cast ==
- Nick Offerman as himself
- Megan Mullally as herself (cameo)
- Marc Evan Jackson as Lawyer

== Reception ==
Nick Offerman: American Ham received mostly positive reviews from critics. Geoffrey Berkshire of Variety, said in his review that "Nick Offerman's affable stage presence carries this fairly routine standup concert film". John DeFore, in his review for The Hollywood Reporter, wrote, "The stand-up film won't please all fans of Offerman's acting work." Kyle Burton of Indiewire graded the film a B−, saying, "American Ham is a solid comedy special—with stylish prerecorded title sequences for each new Tip—but it lacks some of the inventiveness or surprise that might otherwise warrant a slot at a major film festival. But that doesn't negate the way Offerman's honest Americanist attitude regularly leads to laughs and insight."
