= Max Marshall (writer) =

American journalist and author

Max Marshall (born 1993) is an American journalist and author. In 2023, he published Among the Bros: A Fraternity Crime Story, which the New York Times Book Review called "a page-turning triumph."

== Personal life ==
Marshall was born in Dallas, Texas and attended St. Mark's School of Texas. At various points from 2007-2012, he toured as a teenage guitarist with the Steve Miller Band and sat in with guitarist Les Paul. While at St. Mark's, he also formed a band with future electronic dance music artist Spencer Brown.

From 2012-2016 Marshall attended Columbia University, where he pledged Delta Sigma Phi and was elected to Phi Beta Kappa.

== Career ==
After college, Marshall lived in Hanoi, Vietnam and worked as an editor for the Viet Nam News. Writing for GQ, he investigated the assault of American director Jordan Vogt-Roberts at a Ho Chi Minh City nightclub. His reporting linked the attack back to top-ranking members of the United Nations Gang.

Following a brief period as a music critic, Marshall began writing features and cover stories for Texas Monthly. He and a team of writers were finalists for the 2021 National Magazine Award for reviewing all 144 Willie Nelson albums.

Writing for Sports Illustrated, Marshall exposed corruption among Thai government officials and Hollywood executives concerning life rights after the Tham Luang cave rescue.

=== Among the Bros ===
In 2023, HarperCollins published Marshall's first book, Among the Bros: A Fraternity Crime Story.

The book describes Marshall's investigation into a multi-million dollar Xanax trafficking ring at the College of Charleston and fraternity houses around the Deep South. Although the Charleston Police had only announced the discovery of 44,000 Xanax pills, Marshall uncovered a nationwide ring that distributed millions of pills and resulted in several deaths. The book was named a book of the year by Amazon and Glamour and is under development as a feature film for Sony Pictures.
