= Norma Maldonado =

American actress

- Born: August 2, 1962 (age 63); New York City, New York, U.S.
- Occupation: Actress
- Years active: 1988–present
- Spouse: Dragan Buha (m. 1991)
- Children: 2

Norma Maldonado (born August 2, 1962) is an American television and film actress. She has had roles in series such as Crossing Jordan and ER, and appeared in the Heroes web-based spin-off, Heroes: Destiny. She also starred in the movie Our Boys, directed by Leonardo Ricagni. She played the role of Rosa.

== Filmography ==
=== Film ===
Year	Title	Role	Notes
1990	Club Fred	Spanish Maid	
1991	Ted & Venus	Cop #5	
1997	Latin Boys Go to Hell	Mrs. Vega	
1997	A Gun, a Car, a Blonde	Adele / Bunny	
2000	Erin Brockovich	Woman #1	
2000	Under Suspicion	Singer	
2002	Under the Gun	Joan	
2002	Time of Fear	Mrs. Cuervas	
2003	KidSmartz	Narrator	
2008	For Heaven's Sake	Gloria	
2009	Abuelo	Store Clerk	
2010	Spotlight	Caroline Sharp	
2011	Final Sale	Eva Garcia	
2011	Affliction	Dr. Silvia Chalmers	
2013	Life Tracker	Mrs. Valliani	
2013	The Moment	Blanca	
2013	Our Boys	Rosa	
2015	My Date with Carmelo	Mami	
2016	Spotlight 2	Caroline Sharp	
2016	Madre	Alicia	
2017	Like.Share.Follow.	Detective Reyes	
2018	Where Monster Hides	Mom	
2021	Xico's Journey	Cuca	

=== Television ===
Year	Title	Role	Notes
1988	Hotel	Maid	2 episodes
1989	Thirtysomething	Michele	Episode: "Love and Sex"
1991	Sons and Daughters	Ms. Martinez	Episode: "Sniffles"
1994–95	General Hospital	Marina Rojas	
1996	Mad About You	Consuela the Maid	Episode: "Dr. Wonderful"
1997	413 Hope St.	Nurse #2	Episode: "Pilot"
1998	Felicity	Principal	Episode: "Pilot"
1999, 2004	NYPD Blue	Linda Sanchez / Mrs. Iglesias	2 episodes
2000	Passions		
2000	The Huntress	Lt. Maria Chavez	2 episodes
2001–02	ER	Corrine Munoz	2 episodes
2001	Boston Public	Mrs. Grayson	Episode: "Chapter Sixteen"
2001	The Brothers García	Mrs. Vasquez	Episode: "But Football Is a Religion"
2001	24	Nurse	Episode: "5:00 a.m.-6:00 a.m."
2002	American Family	Olivia	Episode: "Pilot"
2002	7th Heaven	Kathleen	Episode: "Letting Go"
2005	Killer Women		Episode: "Ana María Gómez Tejerina, asesina obstinada"
2005	Mystery Woman: Game Time	Clerk	Episode: "Game Time"
2005	Veronica Mars	Maria Oliveres	Episode: "Ahoy Mateys"
2005	Wanted	Meredith Galvan	Episode: "Shoot to Thrill"
2006	Crossing Jordan	Carolyn Macelli / Carolyn Won	2 episodes
2006	Criminal Minds	Maria Sanchez	Episode: "Machismo"
2007	Lincoln Heights	Maricarmen Reyes	Episode: "The 'F' Word"
2007	Desperate Housewives	Michelle	Episode: "Now I Know, Don't Be Scared"
2009	The Closer	Mrs. DeLeon	Episode: "Maternal Instincts"
2010	FlashForward	Judge Sandoz	Episode: "The Garden of Forking Paths"
2010	Mad Men	Celia	Episode: "Public Relations"
2011	Love Bites	Mrs. Ramirez	Episode: "Boys to Men"
2012	The Newsroom	Housekeeper	Episode: "News Night 2.0"
2012	Breaking Bad	Delores	Episode: "Madrigal"
2012	The Mentalist	Delores Recinos	Episode: "Red Dawn"
2013	Modern Family	Psychic	Episode: "A Slight at the Opera"
2013	Bloomers	Valerie Matsumoto	Episode: "Mum's the Word"
2013–14	The Fosters	Karina Sanchez	5 episodes
2015	Inbetween	Doris Pappas	7 episodes
2015	East Los High	Sukie	2 episodes
2015–18	Jane the Virgin	Director	18 episodes
2016	Mad Dogs	Nurse Santiago	Episode: "Leslie"
2016	Heartbeat	Edina McIntyre	Episode: "The Inverse"
2016	Mary + Jane	Mother of the Bride	Episode: "Sn**chelorette"
2016	Noomie	Ms. Morales	Episode: "Surprise Visit"
2017	Doubt	Dr. Deborah Merritt	Episode: "Then and Now"
2017	Superior Donuts	Moderator	Episode: "Secrets and Spies"
2017	The Good Doctor	Lorena Magallanes	Episode: "Not Fake"

=== Video games ===
Year	Title	Role	Notes
2012	L.A. Noire	Female Pedestrian 12	
2018	Lego The Incredibles	Mirage	
