= ISteve =

iSteve
- Directed by: Ryan Perez
- Written by: Ryan Perez
- Starring: Justin Long; Jorge Garcia; James Urbaniak; Michaela Watkins
- Production company: Funny or Die
- Distributed by: Funny or Die
- Release date: April 17, 2013
- Running time: 79 minutes
- Country: United States
- Language: English

iSteve is a 2013 American biographical parody film released on April 17, 2013 by producer Funny or Die, marking their first full-length movie. It claims to be the first biopic on the life of Steve Jobs after his death. The film stars Justin Long, who had previously starred in Apple's Get a Mac ad campaign, as Jobs and Jorge Garcia as Steve Wozniak. The film was written in three days and shot in five by Ryan Perez, a former Saturday Night Live writer.

== Cast ==
In order of appearance

- Justin Long as Steve Jobs
- Jorge Garcia as Steve Wozniak
- James Urbaniak as Bill Gates
- Michaela Watkins as Melinda Gates
- Jill Donnelly as Annie Leibovitz
- Steve Tom as Jack Tramiel
- John Ross Bowie as John Sculley
- Joe Hartzler as Robert Palmer
- Charles Ingram as George Lucas
- Andrée Vermeulen as D'arcy Wretzky
- Paul Rust as Billy Corgan
- Anthony Gioe as Justin Long
- Joe Ferrell as John Hodgman
- Nick Corirossi as Dell Dude
- Kyle Mooney as Steve Jobs's Father
- Gavin Pierce as Young Steve Jobs
- Paul Walter Hauser as Pastey Jones

== Crew ==
- Directed by: Ryan Perez
- Producer: Allison Hord
- Written by: Ryan Perez
- with additional material by: Danny Jelinek, Anne Rieman, Allison Hord, Charles Ingram, Nick Corirossi and Brad Schultz

== Critical review ==
As a free release on the Internet, the movie went unseen by film critics, with most public reactions coming from tech and business bloggers. According to Forbes, early reviews are mixed. Wired reviewer Mat Honan stated that the movie was "profoundly unfunny" and that "If 'Funny or Die' is a promise, the crew should probably start coffin shopping." Honan claims that the film has several inaccuracies but also notes that the film is a parody, which somewhat offsets that. CNET reviewer Amanda Kooser also notes that the movie "cut a few corners as far as accuracy goes". Kooser notes that the film succeeded, in a sense, in beating Ashton Kutcher's Jobs to market as the first Steve Jobs biopic after his death (Pirates of Silicon Valley had been produced and released in 1999, 3 years after Jobs returned to Apple). Kooser also notes that the movie had rampant anachronistic technology term usage. Variety reviewer AJ Marechal notes that the movie, which was written in three days and shot in five, "has its funny moments", but that it may be "too long", especially for the Funny or Die viewership. The New York Times critic Brooks Barnes described the movie as a "biopic poking fun at biopics" and said that writer Ryan Perez said "In true Internet fashion, it’s not based on very thorough research — essentially a cursory look at the Steve Jobs Wikipedia page". Barnes also noted that the movie also bested a third Jobs movie in the works by Aaron Sorkin adapted from Steve Jobs by Walter Isaacson with input from Wozniak to the market. Fortune reviewer Philip Elmer-DeWitt describes the movie as "an over-long Saturday Night Live skit that never quite gets rolling", but noted it had a few things going for it.

Macworld reviewers Dan Moren and Lex Friedman provided one of the few positive reviews describing the movie as a humorous Jobs biography that "...is surprisingly amusing, provided you are both a fan of Apple and of stupid comedy, and presuming you also don’t mind a little profanity sprinkled in for good measure." Forbes reviewer noted that the scheduled April 15 release was delayed 2 days due to the Boston Marathon bombings.
