= Carla Medina =

Mexican singer

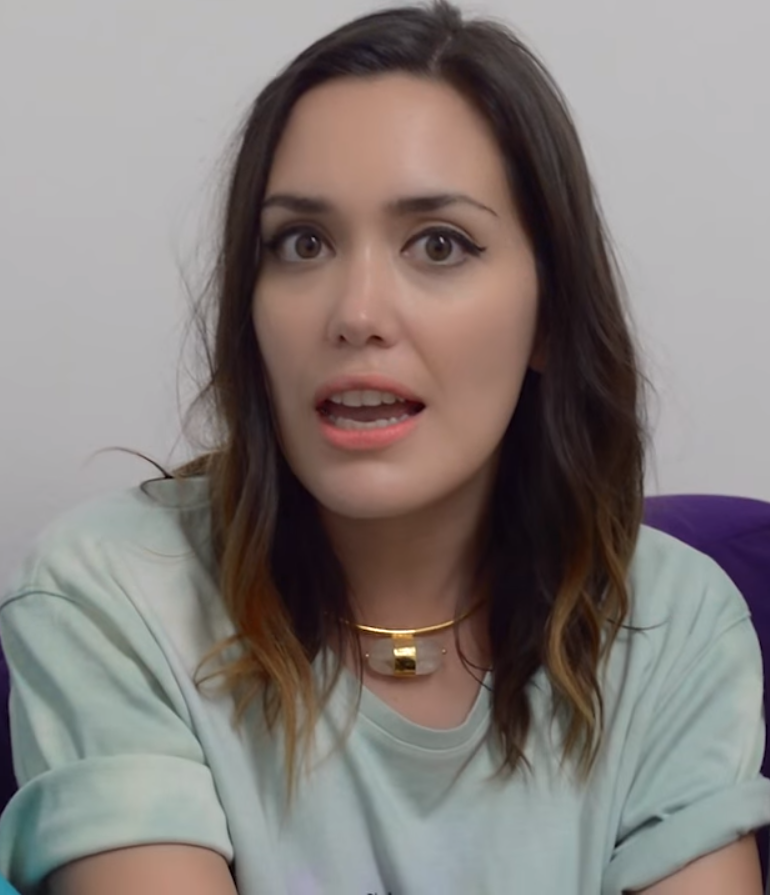
- Medina in 2015

Background information
- Birth name: Carla Rubí Medina Villarreal
- Also known as: Amiga de Alejandro Fernández (Friend of Alejandro Fernandez)
- Born: June 29, 1984 (age 40); Monterrey, Mexico
- Genres: Power pop
- Occupation(s): Singer, actress, television host
- Instruments: Guitar, piano, vocals
- Years active: 1986–present
- Labels: Disney Character Voices International Inc., Walt Disney Records

Carla Rubí Medina Villarreal (born June 29, 1984 in Monterrey), better known as Carla Medina, is a Mexican singer, actress, and television host. She hosted the Disney Channel show Zapping Zone. Medina provided the voice of Trixie in the Spanish soundtrack for Toy Story 3.

She is also a dubbing actress, she did the voice of Vidia in Tinker Bell in 2008, Tinker Bell: Fairies to the Rescue in 2010, Tinker Bell and the Secret of the Fairies in 2012, Tinker Bell: Fairies and Pirates in 2014 and Tinker Bell and the Neverlanding Beast in 2015.

She has done the dubbing of Teddy's best friend Ivy in Good Luck Charlie, Buena Suerte Charlie in Latin America. In 2013 she lent her voice to Evanora the Wicked Witch of the East in Oz the Great and Powerful whose character is played by actress Rachel Weisz. In 2014 she dubbed Gamora, played by Zoe Saldana, in the film Guardians of the Galaxy. In 2016 she dubbed Bellwether the Sheep in the Disney animation film Zootopia.

In 2016 she participated in the digital program Live from E Latino. Its live views range from 30 to 40 thousand people.

In 2018 she created the "Who Cares?" campaign to promote the inclusion of LGBTI people.

== Film ==
- Zootopia, Assistant Mayor Dawn Bellwether (voice, Spanish Latin American version)
- Coco, Departures Agent (voice)
- Guardians Of The Galaxy, Gamora (voice, Spanish Latin American version)
- Guardians Of The Galaxy Vol.2, Gamora (voice, Spanish Latin American version)
- Avengers: Infinity War, Gamora (Voice, Spanish Latin American version)

== Television ==
- Zapping Zone, 2002-2012
- Violetta, 2012-2015
