= Matt Piedmont =

American writer and director (born 1970)

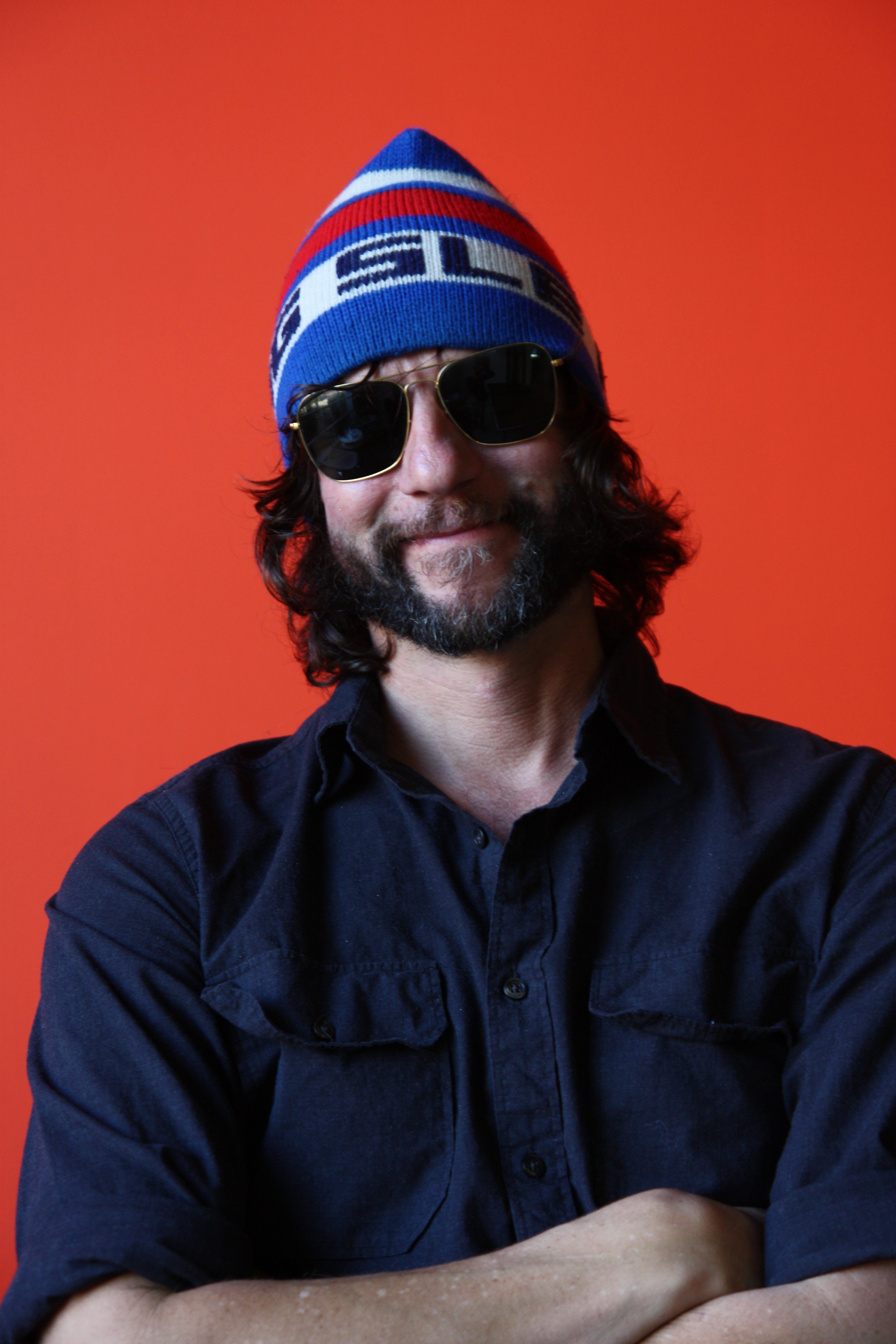
- Born: 1970 (age 55–56); Walnut Creek, California, US
- Occupation: Filmmaker
- Years active: 1997–present

Matt Piedmont (born 1970) is an American film director and writer.

== Career ==
At age 25, he began working as a writer for Saturday Night Live, a position he held for six years, earning an Emmy in the process. Known for writing absurdist sketches like "Shirtless Bible Salesmen", he wrote the sketch with Will Ferrell coming to work in a star-spangled Speedo after 9-11. On his final show in 2002, Will Ferrell held up a sign in the show's closing credits that read "Matt Piedmont is the best in the biz".

Piedmont also created, wrote and directed the popular web series The Carpet Brothers.

Piedmont directed the Spanish-language feature film Casa de mi padre, starring Will Ferrell, Diego Luna, Gael García Bernal, Nick Offerman and Genesis Rodriguez. The movie is entirely in Spanish and was shot using the Panavision C series anamorphic lenses.

Piedmont additionally wrote and directed the short film Brick Novax's Diary, using hand made 1/6 scale figures and sets, as well as other miniatures. The film won the U.S. Narrative Short Film Competition of the 2011 Sundance Film Festival. The film went on to also win the Ellen Award at the Aspen Shorts Festival that same year.

In 2012, he was named one of Variety Magazine's "10 Directors to Watch".

Piedmont also directs commercials through the production company Prettybird. He has directed spots for AT&T, Bud Light, Lincoln, Volkswagen, Gillette, 7 Up, Pepsi, HBO, Microsoft and the Capital One spots featuring Jimmy Fallon, including Old Navy, Seventh Generation, Shout, Gain (with Ty Burrell), among others.

He directed the 2018 H&M Holiday campaign of 6 short films set at the fictional Hotel Mauritz.

He created, executive produced, co-wrote and directed the miniseries The Spoils of Babylon and the follow-up miniseries The Spoils Before Dying.

In April 2015, Piedmont directed the critically acclaimed Celebration of the 60th Anniversary of Allen Ginsberg's "Howl" at Los Angeles's Ace Theater produced by Hal Willner. Featured artists included Nick Cave, Lucinda Williams, Courtney Love, Beth Orton, Macy Gray, Sam Amidon, Andy Kim, Kevin Drew, Van Dyke Parks, The Section String Quartet, Devendra Banhart, Lori Singer, Amy Poehler, Will Forte, Chris Parnell, Peaches, Mocean Worker, Eric Mingus, Petra Haden, Tim Robbins, Chloe Webb, and Hal Willner.

In 2019, he directed all eight episodes of the musical/comedy/variety show Sherman's Showcase.

== Personal life ==
Piedmont lives in Venice, California, with his wife, Jill Cargerman.
