= Funny or Die Presents =

Television series

- Also known as: FOD Presents
- Genre: Comedy
- Created by: Will Ferrell; Adam McKay; Harper Steele (Note: Credited as Andrew Steele; Steele came out as transgender and changed her name in 2022.); Judd Apatow
- Directed by: Matt Piedmont; Jason Woliner; Neal Brennan; Ruben Fleischer; Jeremy Konner
- Starring: Steve Tom
- Country of origin: United States
- Original language: English
- No. of seasons: 2
- No. of episodes: 22 (list of episodes)

Production
- Executive producers: Will Ferrell; Adam McKay; Harper Steele
- Production companies: Funnyordie.com; Gary Sanchez Productions; Apatow Productions

Original release
- Network: HBO
- Release: February 19, 2010 – March 18, 2011

Funny or Die Presents is a half-hour sketch comedy show that spawned from the comedy website Funny or Die, created by Will Ferrell and Adam McKay. It premiered on HBO on February 19, 2010.

== Creation ==
Funny or Die Presents was created in June 2008 when HBO bought a stake in Funnyordie.com and commissioned that at least 10 episodes be broadcast on HBO as part of the deal.

== Description ==
Every show consists of several comedy sketches that vary in length and can contain several sketches or even one full length sketch.

=== Format ===
The program is viewed as if you are watching a television network called "The Funny or Die Network" (sometimes referred to as FOD) which is a hybrid network that fuses the internet with television. Each sketch is viewed as a show on this network, some shows are mini-series, some are shown in parts and some are one offs, only appearing once. In the first episode the network is described as:

What you are about to see is nothing short of a miracle. Television so revolutionary that at this point in time, there is nothing like it anywhere.

Now you may ask yourself: "How is this possible?" Computers, that's how! Funny or die is at the forefront of computer technology, leading the way in computer comedy programming. Tonight marks a departure from our usual business model as we join the ever declining world of broadcast television. Think of what you're about to see as kind of a network unto itself, a half-hour network complete with its own lineup of wonderful shows. Basically, the same kinda horseshit we throw up on our website.

-Ed Haligan, Head of West Coast sales & marketing

Each episode of Season 1 starts in a white room with Ed Haligan (played by Steve Tom) who introduces the show and leads into a starting theme and a "network schedule" which describes the sketches being featured in that particular episode.

=== Notable sketches ===
- "1000 Cats"
- "Drunk History"
- "Derek Waters LOL"
- "Playground Politics"
- "Designated Driver"
- "The Amazing Adventures of David and Jennie"
- "Sleeping with Celebrities"
- "Welcome to my Study"
- "The Slovin & Allen Show"
- "Holdup"
- "The Carpet Brothers"
- "Just 3 Boyz" and "The Terrys" by Tim and Eric

== Cast ==
- Steve Tom as Ed Haligan, the presenter.

The cast of the sketches often include notable celebrities, including:

- Derek Waters
- Malin Åkerman
- Creed Bratton
- Rachael Harris
- Ed Helms
- Rob Huebel
- Rob Riggle
- Paul Scheer
- Brett Gelman
- David Koechner
- Jerry Minor
- Will Ferrell
- Chris Parnell
- Thomas Lennon
- Ian Roberts
- Zach Galifianakis
- John C. Reilly
- Tim Heidecker
- Eric Wareheim
- David Spade
- Zooey Deschanel
- Rich Fulcher
- June Diane Raphael
- Kate Walsh
- Busy Philipps
- Don Cheadle
- Tim Meadows
- Elijah Wood
- Crispin Glover
- Kristen Wiig
- Grey DeLisle
- Maile Flanagan
- Essie Davis as Amelia

=== Writing credits ===
- Harper Steele (9 episodes)
- Jason Woliner (5 episodes)
- Maggie Carey (4 episodes)
- Owen Burke (4 episodes)
- Paul Scheer (4 episodes)
- Rob Riggle (4 episodes)
- Rob Huebel (4 episodes)
- Mike O'Connell (4 episodes)
- Neal Brennan (4 episodes)
- Tim Heidecker (3 episodes)
- Eric Wareheim (3 episodes)
- Andrea Savage (3 episodes)
- Leo Allen (2 episodes)
- Tom Gianas (2 episodes)
- David Neher (2 episodes)
- David Koechner (2 episodes)
- Jennie Pierson (2 episodes)
- T. Sean Shannon (2 episodes)
- Eric Slovin (2 episodes)
- Derek Waters (2 episodes)
- Will Ferrell (1 episode)
- Chris Henchy (1 episode)
- Adam McKay (1 episode)
- Zach Galifianakis (1 episode)
