= List of awards and nominations received by Adam McKay =

Adam McKay awards and nominations
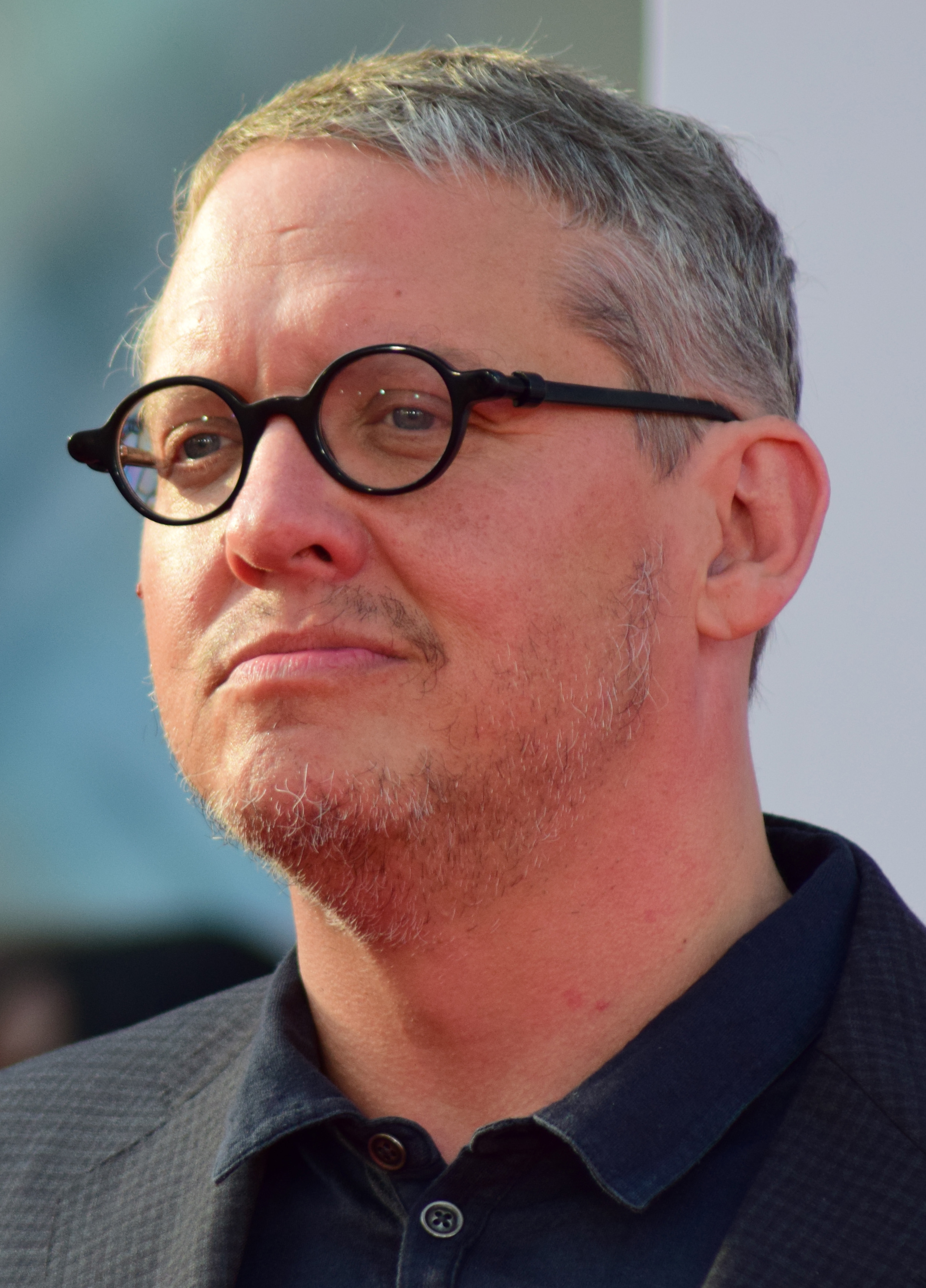
- McKay in 2015
Awards and nominations
Award	Wins	Nominations
Academy Awards	1	7
BAFTA Film Awards	1	5
Golden Globe Awards	0	6
Primetime Emmy Award	4	17

This is a list of awards and nominations received by American film director, producer, screenwriter, comedian and actor Adam McKay.

== Major associations ==
=== Academy Awards ===
Year	Category	Nominated work	Result	Ref.
2015	Best Director	The Big Short	Nominated	
2015	Best Adapted Screenplay	The Big Short	Won	
2018	Best Picture	Vice	Nominated	
2018	Best Director	Vice	Nominated	
2018	Best Original Screenplay	Vice	Nominated	
2021	Best Picture	Don't Look Up	Nominated	
2021	Best Original Screenplay	Don't Look Up	Nominated	

=== BAFTA Film Awards ===
Year	Category	Nominated work	Result	Ref.
2015	Best Direction	The Big Short	Nominated	
2015	Best Adapted Screenplay	The Big Short	Won	
2018	Best Original Screenplay	Vice	Nominated	
2021	Best Film	Don't Look Up	Nominated	
2021	Best Original Screenplay	Don't Look Up	Nominated	

=== Golden Globe Awards ===
Year	Category	Nominated work	Result	Ref.
2015	Best Screenplay – Motion Picture	The Big Short	Nominated	
2018	Best Director – Motion Picture	Vice	Nominated	
2018	Best Screenplay – Motion Picture	Vice	Nominated	
2018	Best Motion Picture – Musical or Comedy	Vice	Nominated	
2021	Best Motion Picture – Musical or Comedy	Don't Look Up	Nominated	
2021	Best Screenplay – Motion Picture	Don't Look Up	Nominated	

=== Primetime Emmy Awards ===
Year	Category	Nominated work	Result	Ref.
2001	Outstanding Writing for a Variety, Music or Comedy Program	Saturday Night Live	Nominated	
2009	Outstanding Variety, Music or Comedy Special	You're Welcome America. A Final Night with George W. Bush	Nominated	
2015	Outstanding Variety Sketch Series	Drunk History	Nominated	
2016	Outstanding Variety Sketch Series	Drunk History	Nominated	
2017	Outstanding Variety Sketch Series	Drunk History	Nominated	
2018	Outstanding Variety Sketch Series	Drunk History	Nominated	
2018	Outstanding Variety Sketch Series	I Love You, America with Sarah Silverman	Nominated	
2019	Outstanding Variety Sketch Series	I Love You, America with Sarah Silverman	Nominated	
2019	Outstanding Variety Sketch Series	Drunk History	Nominated	
2019	Outstanding Variety Special (Live)	Live in Front of a Studio Audience	Won	
2019	Outstanding Directing for a Drama Series	Succession	Nominated	
2019	Outstanding Drama Series	Succession	Nominated	
2020	Outstanding Drama Series	Succession	Won	
2020	Outstanding Comedy Series	Dead to Me	Nominated	
2020	Outstanding Variety Sketch Series	Drunk History	Nominated	
2022	Outstanding Drama Series	Succession	Won	
2023	Outstanding Drama Series	Succession	Won	

== Guilds ==
=== Directors Guild of America Awards ===
Year	Category	Nominated work	Result	Ref.
2015	Outstanding Directing – Feature Film	The Big Short	Nominated	
2018	Outstanding Directing – Feature Film	Vice	Nominated	
2018	Outstanding Directing – Drama Series	Succession	Won	

=== Producers Guild of America Awards ===
Year	Category	Nominated work	Result	Ref.
2018	Best Theatrical Motion Picture	Vice	Nominated	
2019	Best Episodic Drama	Succession	Won	
2021	Best Episodic Drama	Succession	Won	
2021	Best Theatrical Motion Picture	Don't Look Up	Nominated	

=== Writers Guild of America Awards ===
Year	Category	Nominated work	Result	Ref.
2000	Best Comedy-Variety Talk Series	Saturday Night Live	Nominated	
2001	Best Comedy-Variety Talk Series	Saturday Night Live	Nominated	
2009	Best Comedy-Variety Talk Series	Saturday Night Live	Won	
2015	Best Adapted Screenplay	The Big Short	Won	
2018	Best Original Screenplay	Vice	Nominated	
2018	Paul Selvin Award	Vice	Won	
2021	Best Original Screenplay	Don't Look Up	Won	

== Other awards and nominations ==
=== AACTA International Awards ===
Year	Category	Nominated work	Result	Ref.
2015	Best Direction	The Big Short	Nominated	
2018	Best Film	Vice	Nominated	

=== Alliance of Women Film Journalists ===
Year	Category	Nominated work	Result	Ref.
2015	Best Screenplay, Adapted	The Big Short	Nominated	
2018	Best Director	Vice	Nominated	
2018	Best Screenplay, Original	Vice	Nominated	

=== Austin Film Critics Association ===
Year	Category	Nominated work	Result	Ref.
2015	Best Director	The Big Short	Nominated	
2015	Best Adapted Screenplay	The Big Short	Nominated	

=== Chicago Film Critics Association ===
Year	Category	Nominated work	Result	Ref.
2018	Best Original Screenplay	Vice	Nominated	

=== Critics' Choice Movie Awards ===
Year	Category	Nominated work	Result	Ref.
2010	Best Comedy	The Other Guys	Nominated	
2015	Best Adapted Screenplay	The Big Short	Won	
2015	Best Comedy	The Big Short	Won	
2018	Best Picture	Vice	Nominated	
2018	Best Director	Vice	Nominated	
2018	Best Original Screenplay	Vice	Nominated	
2021	Best Picture	Don't Look Up	Nominated	
2021	Best Original Screenplay	Don't Look Up	Nominated	
2021	Best Comedy	Don't Look Up	Nominated	

=== Dallas–Fort Worth Film Critics Association ===
Year	Category	Nominated work	Result	Ref.
2018	Best Film	Vice	Nominated	
2018	Best Director	Vice	Nominated	

=== Detroit Film Critics Society ===
Year	Category	Nominated work	Result	Ref.
2018	Best Director	Vice	Won	
2018	Best Screenplay	Vice	Won	
2021	Best Director	Don't Look Up	Nominated	

=== Empire Awards ===
Year	Category	Nominated work	Result	Ref.
2015	Best Screenplay	The Big Short	Won	

=== Golden Raspberry Awards ===
Year	Category	Nominated work	Result	Ref.
2018	Worst Picture	Holmes & Watson	Won	

=== National Board of Review ===
Year	Category	Nominated work	Result	Ref.
2021	Top 10 Films	Don't Look Up	Nominated	

=== USC Scripter Awards ===
Year	Category	Nominated work	Result	Ref.
2015	Best Adapted Screenplay	The Big Short	Won	

=== St. Louis Film Critics Association ===
Year	Category	Nominated work	Result	Ref.
2018	Best Director	Vice	Nominated	
2018	Best Adapted Screenplay	Vice	Won	

=== Toronto Film Critics Association ===
Year	Category	Nominated work	Result	Ref.
2015	Best Screenplay	The Big Short	Won	
