= Will Ferrell filmography =

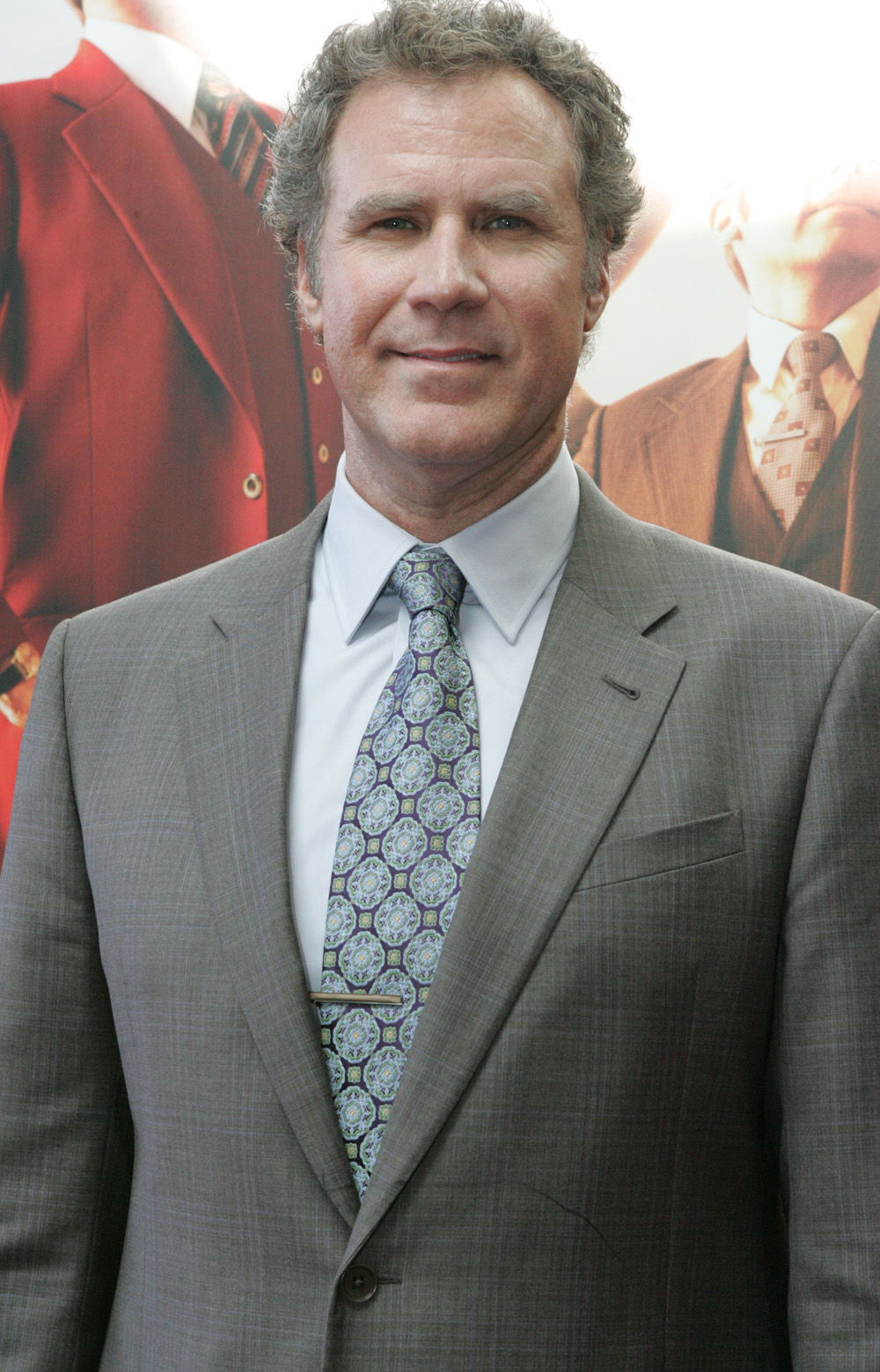
Ferrell in 2013

The following is the filmography of American actor, comedian, producer and writer Will Ferrell.

== Film ==
Key
†	Denotes films that have not yet been released

=== As an actor ===
Table containing films with Will Ferrell
Year	Title	Role	Notes	Ref.
1996	Criminal Hearts	Newscaster	Uncredited	
1997	Men Seeking Women	Al		
1997	Austin Powers: International Man of Mystery	Mustafa		
1998	A Night at the Roxbury	Steve Butabi	Also writer	
1998	The Thin Pink Line	Darren Clark		
1999	Austin Powers: The Spy Who Shagged Me	Mustafa		
1999	Dick	Bob Woodward		
1999	Superstar	Sky Corrigan / Jesus		
1999	The Suburbans	Gil		
2000	Drowning Mona	Cubby the Funeral Director		
2000	The Ladies Man	Lance DeLune		
2001	Jay and Silent Bob Strike Back	Federal Wildlife Marshal Willenholly		
2001	Zoolander	Jacobim Mugatu		
2002	Boat Trip	Brian's Boyfriend	Uncredited	
2003	Old School	Frank "The Tank" Ricard		
2003	Elf	Buddy Hobbs		
2004	Starsky & Hutch	Big Earl	Uncredited	
2004	Anchorman: The Legend of Ron Burgundy	Ron Burgundy	Also writer and executive soundtrack producer	
2004	Melinda and Melinda	Hobie		
2004	Wake Up, Ron Burgundy: The Lost Movie	Ron Burgundy	Direct-to-DVD; also writer	
2004	Oh, What a Lovely Tea Party	Himself	Documentary	
2005	The Wendell Baker Story	Dave Bix		
2005	Kicking & Screaming	Phil Weston		
2005	Bewitched	Jack Wyatt	Also songwriter: "Promised Land"	
2005	Wedding Crashers	Chazz Reinhold	Uncredited	
2005	Winter Passing	Corbit		
2005	The Producers	Franz Liebkind		
2006	Curious George	Ted Shackelford / "The Man with the Yellow Hat"	Voice	
2006	Talladega Nights: The Ballad of Ricky Bobby	Ricky Bobby	Also writer, executive producer, and songwriter: "Guaranteed Cool"	
2006	Stranger than Fiction	Harold Crick		
2007	Blades of Glory	Chazz Michael Michaels		
2008	Semi-Pro	Jackie Moon	Also songwriter: "Love Me Sexy"	
2008	Step Brothers	Brennan Huff	Also writer, executive producer, and songwriter: "Boats 'n Hoes"	
2009	Land of the Lost	Dr. Rick Marshall		
2009	The Goods: Live Hard, Sell Hard	Craig McDermott	Uncredited; also producer	
2010	The Other Guys	Detective Allen Gamble	Also producer and songwriter: "Pimps Don't Cry"	
2010	Everything Must Go	Nick Halsey		
2010	Megamind	Megamind	Voice	
2011	Megamind: The Button of Doom	Megamind	Voice, short film	
2012	Tim and Eric's Billion Dollar Movie	Damien Weebs	Also producer	
2012	Casa de mi padre	Armando Alvarez	Also producer	
2012	The Campaign	Cam Brady	Also producer	
2013	The Internship	Kevin	Uncredited	
2013	Anchorman 2: The Legend Continues	Ron Burgundy	Also writer, producer, executive soundtrack producer, and songwriter: "Whammy Chicken", "Doby", "Big, Big World", and "Gay For a Day"	
2014	The Lego Movie	Lord Business/The Man Upstairs	Voice	
2015	Get Hard	James King	Also producer	
2015	Daddy's Home	Brad Whitaker	Also producer	
2016	Zoolander 2	Jacobim Mugatu		
2017	The House	Scott Johansen	Also producer	
2017	Daddy's Home 2	Brad Whitaker	Also producer	
2018	Holmes & Watson	Sherlock Holmes	Also producer	
2019	The Lego Movie 2: The Second Part	President (Lord) Business/The Man Upstairs	Voice	
2019	Drunk Parents	Bum	Cameo	
2019	Between Two Ferns: The Movie	Himself		
2019	Zeroville	Rondell	Uncredited	
2020	Downhill	Pete Stanton		
2020	Impractical Jokers: The Movie	Miami Restaurant Guy #4	Cameo	
2020	Eurovision Song Contest: The Story of Fire Saga	Lars Erickssong	Also writer and producer	
2020	David	Therapist	Short film	
2022	Spirited	Ghost of Christmas Present / Ebenezer Scrooge	Also producer	
2023	Barbie	CEO of Mattel		
2023	Strays	Reggie	Voice	
2023	Quiz Lady	Terry McTeer	Also producer	
2024	Will & Harper	Himself	Documentary; also producer	
2024	Despicable Me 4	Maxime Le Mal	Voice	
2025	You're Cordially Invited	Jim	Also producer	
2025	Arco	Dougie	Voice; English dub	
2025	A Very Jonas Christmas Movie	Himself	Cameo	
TBA	Judgment Day †		Post-production; also producer	
TBA	The Fifth Wheel †	Brad La Cadabra	Filming; also producer	

=== As producer ===
Year	Title	Notes
2007	Hot Rod	Executive producer
2010	The Virginity Hit	
2012	Bachelorette	
2013	Hansel & Gretel: Witch Hunters	
2014	Tammy	
2014	Welcome to Me	
2015	Sleeping with Other People	
2016	The Boss	
2017	Oh Lucy!	Executive producer
2018	Ibiza	
2018	Vice	
2019	Booksmart	
2019	Hustlers	
2021	Barb and Star Go to Vista Del Mar	
2022	Am I OK?	
2022	The Menu	
2023	Theater Camp	
2023	May December	

== Television ==
=== As an actor ===
Year	Title	Role	Notes
1995	A Bucket of Blood	Young man	Television film
1995	On Our Own	Construction Worker	Episode: "Little Rascals"
1995	Grace Under Fire	Man at Meeting	Episode: "When It Rains, They Pour"
1995	Living Single	Roommate from Hell #1	Episode: "Talk Showdown"
1995–2002; 2005–2026	Saturday Night Live	Various roles Host	138 episodes Episode: "Will Ferrell/Queens of the Stone Age" (2005); Episode: "Will Ferrell/Green Day" (2009); Episode: "Will Ferrell/Usher" (2012); Episode: "Will Ferrell/Chris Stapleton" (2018); Episode: "Will Ferrell/King Princess" (2019) Episode: "Will Ferrell/Paul McCartney" (2026)
1997	Cow and Chicken	Farmer / Astronaut #2	Voice, episode: "Space Cow/Orthodontic Police"
1997	The Angry Beavers	Bouncer	Voice, episode: "Food of the Clods"
1998	Hercules	Geryon	Voice, episode: "Hercules and the Jilt Trip"
1999	King of the Hill	Coach Lucas	Voice, episode: "Three Coaches and a Bobby"
1999	Happily Ever After: Fairy Tales for Every Child	Mamet the Moocher	Voice, episode: "Ali Baba and the Forty Thieves"
2000	Strangers with Candy	Bob Whitely	Episode: "Trail of Tears"
2001	Family Guy	The Black Knight	Voice, episode: "Mr. Saturday Knight"
2001	Pepper Ann	Alf	Voice, episode: "Searching for Pepper Ann Pearson"
2001	Undeclared	Dave	Episode: "Addicts"
2001–2002	The Oblongs	Bob Oblong, Coach	Voice, Main role
2003	The Guardian	Attorney Larry Flood	Episode: "All the Rage"
2007	The Naked Trucker and T-Bones Show	Chuck Billson	Episode: "Demo Tape"
2008	Saturday Night Live Weekend Update Thursday	George W. Bush	Episode: "1.3"
2009	SpongeBob SquarePants	Himself	Episode: "SpongeBob's Truth or Square"
2009	Man vs. Wild	Himself	Episode: "Man vs. Wild: The Will Ferrell Special"
2009	You're Welcome America: A Final Night With George W. Bush	George W. Bush	Television special
2009–2012	Eastbound & Down	Ashley Schaeffer	5 episodes; also executive producer
2010	Tim and Eric Awesome Show, Great Job!	Donald Mahanahanr	Episode: "Stuntmen"
2010–2011	Funny or Die Presents	Grant Measum, Will	2 episodes; also co-creator and executive producer
2010–2012	30 Rock	Shane Hunter	3 episodes
2011	The Office	Deangelo Vickers	Recurring Role (Season 7); 4 episodes
2011	2011 MTV Video Music Awards	Future Ad-Rock	Television special
2012–2013	Conan	Ron Burgundy	3 episodes
2013	Jimmy Kimmel Live!	Ron Burgundy	Episode: "11.94"
2014	The Spoils of Babylon	Eric Jonrosh	6 episodes; also executive producer
2014	@midnight	Chad Softwick	Episode: "2.34"
2014	Welcome to Sweden	Himself	Episode: "Learn the Language"
2015	Comedy Central Roast of Justin Bieber	Ron Burgundy	Television special
2015	A Deadly Adoption	Robert Benson	Television film; also executive producer
2015	The Spoils Before Dying	Eric Jonrosh	6 episodes; also executive producer
2015, 2019	Drunk History	Various	2 episodes; also executive producer
2015	The Last Man on Earth	Gordon Vanderkruik	Episode: "The Boo"
2015	The Chris Gethard Show	Himself	Episode: "Speed Weddings"; also executive producer
2015	Ferrell Takes the Field	Himself	Television special; also executive producer
2016	The Jim Gaffigan Show	Himself	2 episodes
2017	Throwing Shade	Murph	Episode #1.1
2017	Not the White House Correspondents' Dinner	George W. Bush	Special episode of Full Frontal with Samantha Bee
2017	No Activity	Adrian	3 episodes; also executive producer
2018	The 2018 Rose Parade Hosted by Cord & Tish	Cord Hosenbeck	Amazon Video coverage; also executive producer
2018	The Royal Wedding Live with Cord & Tish!	Cord Hosenbeck	HBO coverage; also executive producer
2019	Live in Front of a Studio Audience	Tom Willis	Episode: "Norman Lear's All in the Family and The Jeffersons"; also executive producer
2020	COVID Is No Joke	Himself	Television special
2020	Feeding America Comedy Festival	Himself	Television special
2021	Demi Lovato: Dancing with the Devil	Himself	YouTube documentary series
2021	The Shrink Next Door	Martin "Marty" Markowitz	Miniseries; also executive producer
2024	Stupid Pet Tricks	Ranger Jim	Episode: "The Ranger Whose Wife Left Him"
2024	The Roast of Tom Brady	Ron Burgundy	Netflix special
2024	John Mulaney Presents: Everybody's in LA	Lou Adler	Episode: "Coyotes"
2024	The Boys	Himself as "Coach Brink"	4 episodes
2026	The Hawk	Lonnie "The Hawk" Hawkins	Main role; also co-creator and executive producer

=== As executive producer ===
Year	Title	Notes
2010	Big Lake	
2014–2015	Bad Judge	
2017–2019	I'm Sorry	
2017–2018	I Love You, America with Sarah Silverman	
2018	LA to Vegas	
2018–2023	Succession	
2019–2022	Dead to Me	
2020–2022	Motherland: Fort Salem	
2020	Robbie	
2024	No Good Deed	
TBA	Totally Spies! (Live Action)	

== Theatre ==
Year	Title	Role	Notes
2009	You're Welcome America: A Final Night with George W Bush	President George W. Bush	Broadway
2023	Gutenberg! The Musical!	The Producer (One night only)	Broadway

== Music videos ==
List of music videos, showing year released and director
Artist(s)	Title	Year	Director(s)
Beastie Boys	"Make Some Noise"	2011	MCA
Prestige WorldWide	"Boats & Hoe's"	2008	
Gal Gadot & Friends	"Imagine"	2020	—N/a

== Video games ==
Year	Title	Voice role	Notes
2006	Curious George	Ted Shackelford	
2014	The Lego Movie Videogame	Lord Business	Archive audio
