= List of awards and nominations received by Will Ferrell =

List of Will Ferrell awards
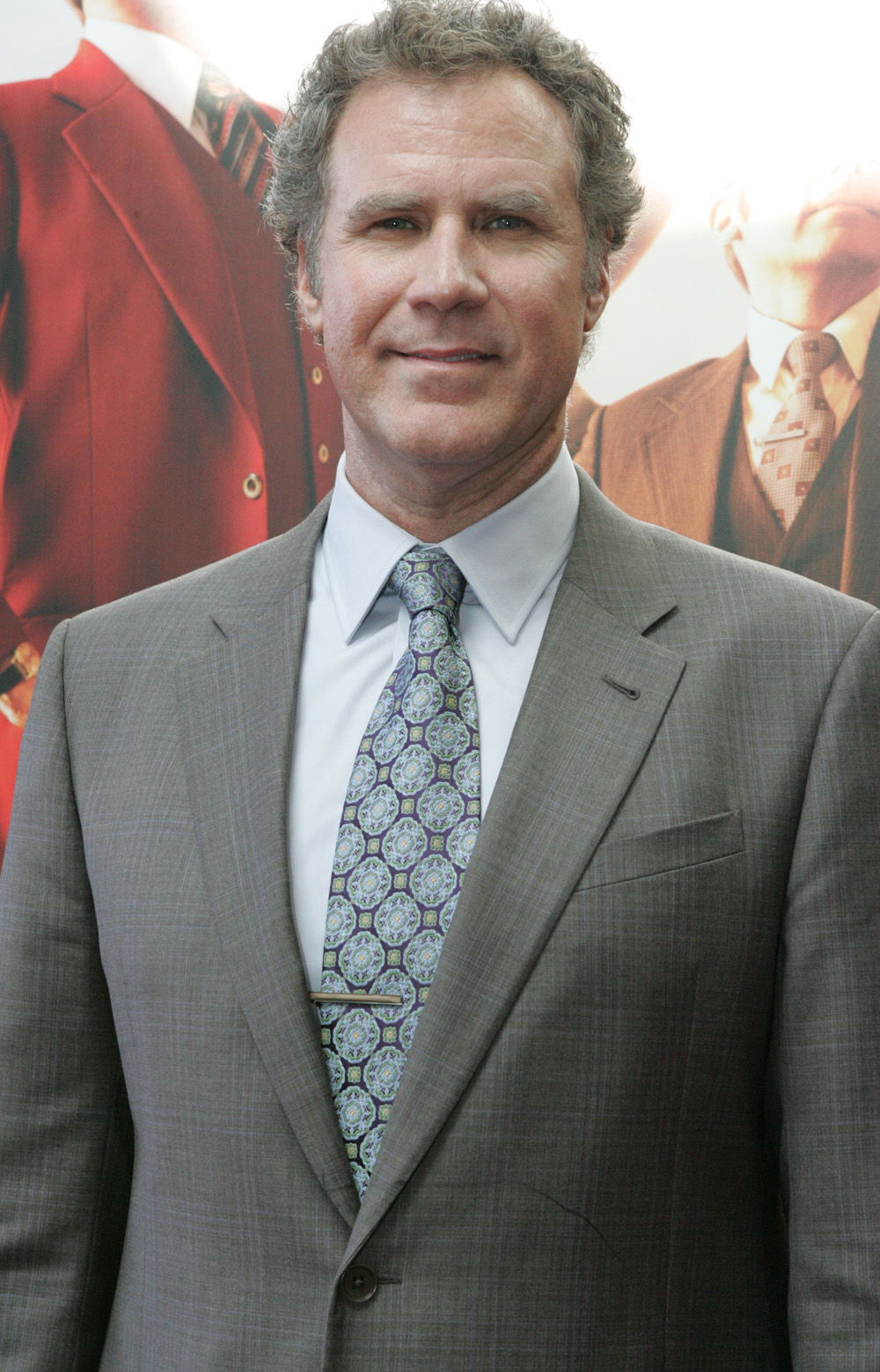
- Ferrell in 2013
Award	Wins	Nominations
Primetime Emmy Awards	6	20
Golden Globe Awards	0	2
BAFTA Awards	1	5
Tony Awards	0	1

Will Ferrell is an American comedian and actor. He has received sixteen Primetime Emmy Award nominations winning six awards, including two for Succession (2020), and two for Live in Front of a Studio Audience (2019, 2020) respectively. Ferrell received two Golden Globe Award nominations for his performances in The Producers (2005), and Stranger than Fiction (2006). He also received a Tony Award nomination for Best Special Theatrical Event for You're Welcome America. A Final Night with George W Bush (2009).

== Major associations ==
=== Emmy Awards ===
Primetime Emmy Awards
Year	Category	Nominated work	Result	Ref.
2001	Outstanding Individual Performance in a Variety or Music Program	Saturday Night Live	Nominated	
2009	Outstanding Variety, Music or Comedy Special	You're Welcome America. A Final Night with George W. Bush	Nominated	
2009	Outstanding Writing for a Variety, Music or Comedy Special	You're Welcome America. A Final Night with George W. Bush	Nominated	
2015	Outstanding Variety Sketch Series	Drunk History	Nominated	
2016	Outstanding Variety Sketch Series	Drunk History	Nominated	
2017	Outstanding Variety Sketch Series	Drunk History	Nominated	
2018	Outstanding Variety Sketch Series	Drunk History	Nominated	
2018	Outstanding Variety Sketch Series	I Love You, America with Sarah Silverman	Nominated	
2019	Outstanding Variety Sketch Series	I Love You, America with Sarah Silverman	Nominated	
2019	Outstanding Variety Sketch Series	Drunk History	Nominated	
2019	Outstanding Variety Special (Live)	Live in Front of a Studio Audience: "All in the Family" and "The Jeffersons"	Won	
2019	Outstanding Drama Series	Succession	Nominated	
2020	Outstanding Drama Series	Succession	Won	
2020	Outstanding Comedy Series	Dead to Me	Nominated	
2020	Outstanding Variety Sketch Series	Drunk History	Nominated	
2020	Outstanding Variety Special (Live)	Live in Front of a Studio Audience: "All in the Family" and "Good Times"	Won	
2022	Outstanding Drama Series	Succession	Won	
2022	Outstanding Variety Special (Live)	Live in Front of a Studio Audience: "The Facts of Life" and "Diff'rent Strokes"	Nominated	
2023	Outstanding Drama Series	Succession	Won	
2024	Outstanding Television Movie	Quiz Lady	Won	

=== Golden Globe Awards ===
Year	Category	Nominated work	Result	Ref.
2006	Best Supporting Actor – Motion Picture	The Producers	Nominated	
2007	Best Actor in a Motion Picture – Musical or Comedy	Stranger than Fiction	Nominated	

=== BAFTA Awards ===
Year	Category	Nominated work	Result
British Academy Television Awards
2019	Best International Programme	Succession	Won
2020	Best International Programme	Succession	Nominated
2022	Best International Programme	Succession	Nominated
2024	Best International Programme	Succession	Nominated
British Academy Film Awards
2025	Best Documentary	Will & Harper	Nominated

=== Screen Actors Guild Awards ===
Year	Category	Nominated work	Result	Ref.
2024	Outstanding Performance by a Cast in a Motion Picture	Barbie	Nominated	

=== Tony Awards ===
Year	Category	Nominated work	Result	Ref.
2009	Best Special Theatrical Event	You're Welcome America. A Final Night with George W. Bush	Nominated	

== Miscellaneous awards ==
=== ESPY Awards ===
Year	Category	Nominated work	Result
2007	Best Sports Movie	Talladega Nights: The Ballad of Ricky Bobby	Won
2008	Best Sports Movie	Semi-Pro	Won

=== Golden Raspberry Awards ===
Year	Category	Nominated work	Result
2005	Worst Screen Combo (with Nicole Kidman)	Bewitched	Won
2005	Worst Actor	Bewitched and Kicking & Screaming	Nominated
2009	Worst Actor	Land of the Lost	Nominated
2009	Worst Screen Combo (with any co-star, creature or "comic riff")	Land of the Lost	Nominated
2016	Worst Supporting Actor	Zoolander 2	Nominated
2019	Worst Actor	Holmes & Watson	Nominated
2019	Worst Picture (as a producer)	Holmes & Watson	Won
2019	Worst Screen Combo (with John C. Reilly)	Holmes & Watson	Nominated

=== Kids' Choice Awards ===
Year	Category	Nominated work	Result
2011	Favorite Buttkicker	Megamind	Nominated
2016	Favorite Movie Actor	Daddy's Home	Won
2017	Favorite Villain	Zoolander 2	Nominated
2018	Favorite Movie Actor	Daddy's Home 2	Nominated
2021	Favorite Movie Actor	Eurovision Song Contest: The Story of Fire Saga	Nominated
2025	Favorite Male Voice From An Animated Movie	Despicable Me 4	Nominated

=== Major League Soccer ===
Year	Team	Event	Result	Ref.
2022	Los Angeles F.C. (part-owner)	MLS Cup	Won	

=== MTV Movie & TV Awards ===
Year	Category	Nominated work	Result
2003	Best Comedic Performance	Old School	Nominated
2003	Best On-Screen Team (with Luke Wilson and Vince Vaughn)	Old School	Nominated
2004	Best Comedic Performance	Elf	Nominated
2005	Best Comedic Performance	Anchorman: The Legend of Ron Burgundy	Nominated
2005	Best On-Screen Team (with Paul Rudd, Steve Carell and David Koechner)	Anchorman: The Legend of Ron Burgundy	Nominated
2005	Best Musical Performance (with Paul Rudd, David Koechner and Steve Carell)	Anchorman: The Legend of Ron Burgundy	Nominated
2007	Best Kiss (with Sacha Baron Cohen)	Talladega Nights: The Ballad of Ricky Bobby	Won
2007	Best Comedic Performance	Blades of Glory	Nominated
2007	Best Fight	Blades of Glory	Nominated

=== Saturn Awards ===
Year	Category	Nominated work	Result
2006	Best Actor	Stranger than Fiction	Nominated

=== Satellite Awards ===
Year	Category	Nominated work	Result
2006	Best Actor in a Motion Picture, Comedy or Musical	Stranger Than Fiction	Nominated

=== Spike TV Guys' Choice Awards ===
Year	Category	Nominated work	Result
2007	Funniest Mo-fo	—N/a	Won
2007	Most Viral Video	—N/a	Won

=== Teen Choice Awards ===
Year	Category	Nominated work	Result
2004	Choice Comedian	—N/a	Nominated
2004	Choice Movie Actor – Comedy	Elf	Nominated
2005	Choice Comedian	—N/a	Nominated
2005	Choice Movie Actor – Comedy	Anchorman: The Legend of Ron Burgundy and Kicking & Screaming	Nominated
2005	Choice Movie Hissy Fit	Kicking & Screaming	Nominated
2005	Choice Movie Rumble	Anchorman: The Legend of Ron Burgundy	Nominated
2005	Choice Movie Sleazebag	Kicking & Screaming	Nominated
2007	Choice Comedian	—N/a	Nominated
2007	Choice Movie Actor – Comedy	Talladega Nights: The Ballad of Ricky Bobby and Blades of Glory	Won
2007	Choice Movie Chemistry (with Jon Heder)	Blades of Glory	Nominated
2007	Choice Movie Dance (with Jon Heder)	Blades of Glory	Nominated
2007	Choice Movie Hissy Fit	Blades of Glory	Nominated
2008	Choice Comedian	—N/a	Nominated
2008	Choice Movie Actor – Comedy	Semi-Pro	Nominated
2009	Choice Movie Actor – Comedy	Land of the Lost	Nominated

== Honors ==
=== British GQ Men of the Year ===
Year	Category	Nominated work	Result
2015	Comedian of the Year	—N/a	Won

=== Hollywood Walk of Fame ===
Year	Category	Nominated work	Result
2015	Motion Pictures	All film work	Inducted

=== James Joyce Awards ===
Year	Category	Nominated work	Result
2008	From University College Dublin's Literary and Historical Society in recognition for "excelling in his field"	—N/a	Won

=== Mark Twain Prize for American Humor ===
Year	Category	Nominated work	Result
2011	Mark Twain Prize for American Humor	—N/a	Won
