= Will Ferrell =

American actor and comedian (born 1967)

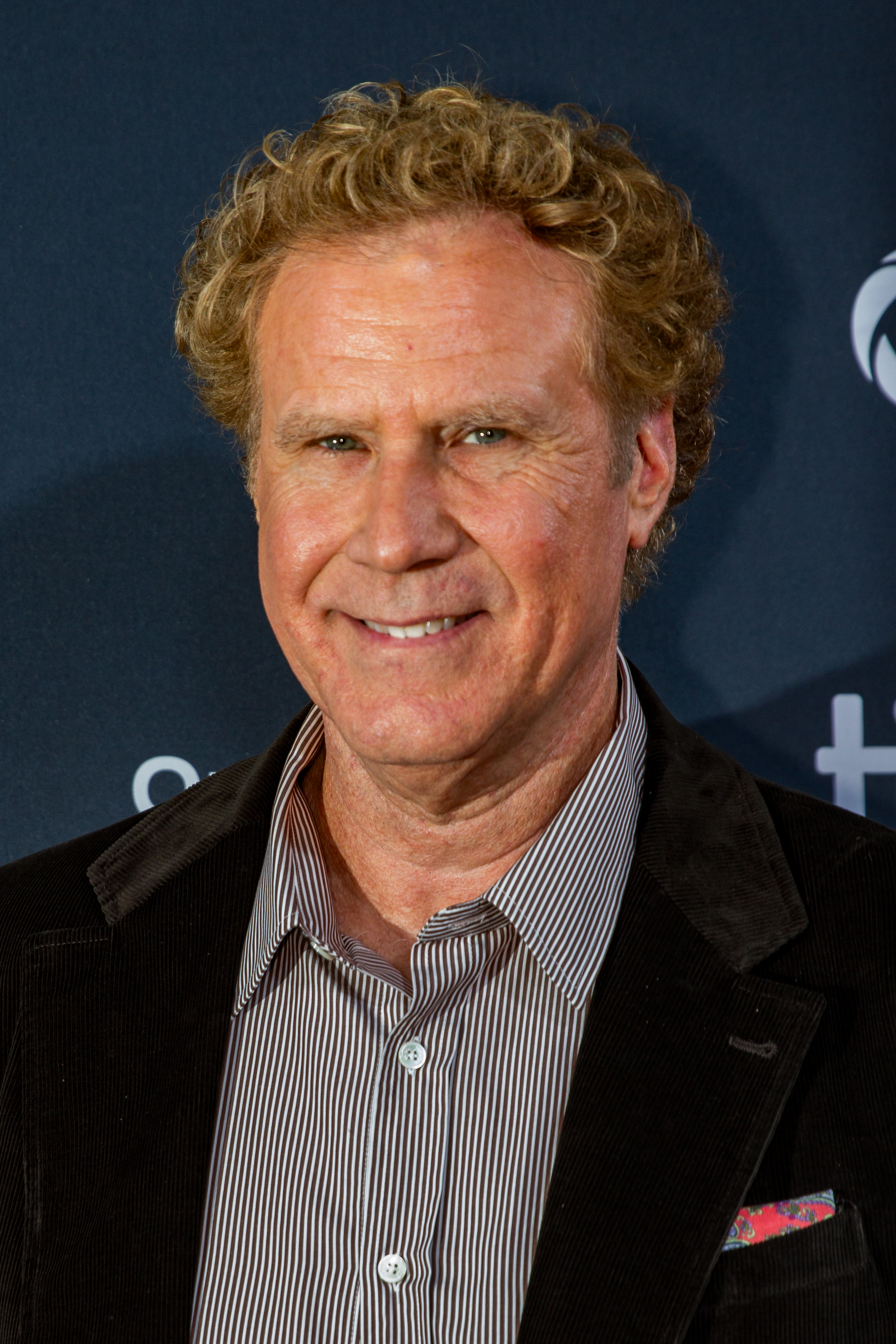
- Ferrell in 2024
- Born: John William Ferrell; July 16, 1967 (age 59); Irvine, California, U.S.
- Education: University of Southern California (BA)
- Occupations: Actor; comedian; producer; writer
- Years active: 1994–present
- Works: Full list
- Spouse: Viveca Paulin (m. 2000)
- Children: 3
- Awards: Full list

John William Ferrell (/ˈfɛrəl/; born July 16, 1967) is an American actor, comedian, writer, and producer. He is known for his leading man roles in comedy films and for his work as a television producer. Ferrell has received various accolades, including six Primetime Emmy Awards and a British Academy Television Award, in addition to nominations for two Golden Globe Awards and for a Tony Award. In 2011, Ferrell was honored with the Mark Twain Prize for American Humor. In 2015, he received a star on the Hollywood Walk of Fame and was named the year's best comedian in British GQ.

Ferrell first established himself in the mid-1990s as a cast member on the sketch comedy series Saturday Night Live, where he performed from 1995 to 2002, and has subsequently starred in a string of comedy films. After starring in the 2003 comedy film Old School, Ferrell became considered a member of the "Frat Pack", a generation of leading Hollywood comic actors who emerged in the late 1990s and the 2000s, including Jack Black, Ben Stiller, Steve Carell, Vince Vaughn, Paul Rudd, and brothers Owen and Luke Wilson. He founded the comedy website Funny or Die in 2007 with his former writing partner Adam McKay.

Ferrell has starred in comedy films such as A Night at the Roxbury (1998), Elf (2003), Anchorman (2004), Kicking & Screaming (2005), Talladega Nights (2006), Blades of Glory (2007), Step Brothers (2008), The Other Guys (2010), Get Hard (2015), and Barbie (2023). He has also taken dramatic roles in Stranger than Fiction (2006), Everything Must Go (2010), and Downhill (2020). He has voiced roles in Curious George (2006), Megamind (2010), The Lego Movie film franchise (2014–2019), and Despicable Me 4 (2024). He also starred in and produced the documentary Will & Harper (2024) with writer Harper Steele.

Ferrell has received four Primetime Emmy Awards for his work as a producer on the drama series Succession (2018–2023) and for the specials Live in Front of a Studio Audience (2019–2022). He also produced the series I'm Sorry (2017–2019), the series Dead to Me (2019–2022), and the series Drunk History (2013–2019). For his work on Broadway he received a Tony Award nomination for Best Special Theatrical Event for his satirical portrayal as George W. Bush in You're Welcome America (2009).

== Early life and education ==
John William Ferrell was born on July 16, 1967, in Irvine, California, to Betty Kay (née Overman), a teacher who taught at Old Mill School elementary school and Santa Ana College, and Roy Lee Ferrell Jr., who played saxophone and keyboards for the Righteous Brothers. His parents were both natives of Roanoke Rapids, North Carolina. They moved to California in 1964. Ferrell's ancestry includes English, German, and Irish. As an infant Ferrell suffered from pyloric stenosis and had a pyloromyotomy to correct the condition. He has a younger brother, Patrick.

When he was eight years old, his parents divorced. Ferrell said of the divorce: "I was the type of kid who would say, 'Hey, look at the bright side! We'll have two Christmases'." The divorce was amicable, and both parents were committed to their children. The biggest problem was his father's line of work. As a person in show business, his paychecks were never steady, and he traveled from home for months at a time. Growing up in this environment made Ferrell not want to go into show business and instead have a steady job.

Ferrell first attended school at Culverdale Elementary and later attended Rancho San Joaquin Middle School, both in Irvine. He attended University High School in Irvine, and was a kicker for the school's varsity football team. He was also on the soccer team and captain of the basketball team, as well as serving on the student council. Ferrell called third grade "a pivotal year." He realized he could make his classmates laugh if he pretended to smash his head against the wall, or if he tripped and fell on purpose, and said it was a great way to make friends. He said the dullness of Irvine contributed to the growth of his humor:

Growing up in suburbia, in safe, master-planned Irvine, there was no drama so we had to create it in our heads. My main form of entertainment was cracking my friends up and exploring new ways of being funny. I didn't have to have the survival mode instinct like other comics, who grew up in tough neighborhoods. I had the opposite. For me, I grew up in Mayberry, and the humor broke the boredom. And there was a lot to make fun of.

In his senior year of high school, Ferrell and a friend would perform comedy skits over the school's intercom system, with cooperation from the principal; the two had to write their own material. Ferrell also performed comedic skits in the school's talent shows. He was voted "Best Personality" by his classmates. He enrolled at the University of Southern California, where he studied sports broadcasting and joined the Delta Tau Delta fraternity. In college, he was known for a few pranks. On occasion, he would dress in a janitor's outfit and stroll into his friends' classes. He was also known for streaking around campus with a few other people from the Delta Tau Delta fraternity. Ferrell earned an internship at a local television station in the sports department, but he did not enjoy the work.

== Career ==
=== 1990–1995: Early career ===
After graduating with a B.A. degree in sports information in 1990, he knew he did not want to do broadcasting. He took up a job as a hotel valet where, on his second day, he tore a baggage rack off the top of a van by trying to drive it under a low beam. He also worked as a teller at Wells Fargo, but came up short $300 the first day and $280 the second; he was not stealing the money, but was just careless and error-prone. In 1991, encouraged by his mother to pursue something he liked, Ferrell moved to Los Angeles. He successfully auditioned for the comedy group The Groundlings where he spent time developing his improvisation skills.

Before joining The Groundlings, Ferrell's attempts at standup comedy had little success. He started in the advanced classes and grew to love improvisation. He realized he also liked to impersonate people, and one of his favorites was Harry Caray, the Hall of Fame baseball announcer. Soon he began to create original characters, and by 1994 he had joined The Groundlings. With fellow Groundlings member Chris Kattan, he created the Butabi Brothers, who go out to dance clubs to try to pick up women but are constantly rejected. While taking classes, Ferrell got a job at an auction house via his friend Viveca Paulin. The job was ideal as it was flexible enough for him to audition and go to rehearsals while remaining employed. By 1995, he was receiving small roles, including appearances in TV series like Grace Under Fire and Living Single, low-budget films such as A Bucket of Blood, as well as commercials. One winter, he served as a mall Santa Claus.

=== 1995–2001: Saturday Night Live ===
After SNL's decline in popularity in 1994–1995, and in need of new cast members for the next season, a producer saw The Groundlings and asked Ferrell, Kattan, and Cheri Oteri to audition for SNL's main producer, Lorne Michaels. Ferrell joined Saturday Night Live in 1995 and left in 2002 after a seven-year tenure. He has hosted the show five times, thereby becoming a member of the show's Five Timers Club.

During his time on SNL, Ferrell made a name for himself with his impersonations, which included U.S. President George W. Bush, Chicago Cubs announcer Harry Caray, singer Robert Goulet (crooning a cappella pieces of music by Sisqó, Baha Men, and The Notorious B.I.G.), singer Neil Diamond, Inside the Actors Studio host James Lipton (who enjoyed Ferrell's impersonation), Massachusetts Senator Ted Kennedy, United States Attorney General Janet Reno, convicted Unabomber Ted Kaczynski, game show host Alex Trebek, fictitious private detective John Shaft, professional wrestler Jesse Ventura, U.S. Vice President Al Gore, Iraqi President Saddam Hussein, and Cuban President Fidel Castro.

His original characters included Morning Latte co-host Tom Wilkins, Mister Ed the Horse's twin brother Ned, fictional Blue Öyster Cult member Gene Frenkle (physically modeled after the band's vocalist Eric Bloom), music teacher Marty Culp, cheerleader Craig Buchanan, Dale Sturtevant from Dissing Your Dog, Hank of the Bill Brasky Buddies, David Leary from Dog Show, angry and inattentive Dr. Beaman and night clubber Steve Butabi in sketches that were turned into a feature film in 1998's A Night at the Roxbury. Although a one-shot character, one of Ferrell's most memorable SNL characters is Dale McGrew, a "highly patriotic" office worker who comes to work wearing a half t-shirt and short shorts that Ferrell improvised into a thong just before the skit aired live, leading to genuine laughter from the cast and guest host Seann William Scott. Ferrell became the highest paid cast member on Saturday Night Live in 2001 with a season salary of $350,000. Ferrell returned to Saturday Night Live as a guest host on May 14, 2005; May 16, 2009; May 12, 2012; January 27, 2018, November 23, 2019, and May 26, 2026 for the season 51 finale. For the first two hosting appearances, he reprised his role as Alex Trebek in the "Celebrity Jeopardy" sketches. On the May 14 appearance, Ferrell reprised his role as Robert Goulet in a fake commercial advertising a series of ringtones and, during the performance of the song "Little Sister" by musical guests Queens of the Stone Age, Ferrell came on stage playing the cowbell.

=== 2002–2010: Film stardom ===
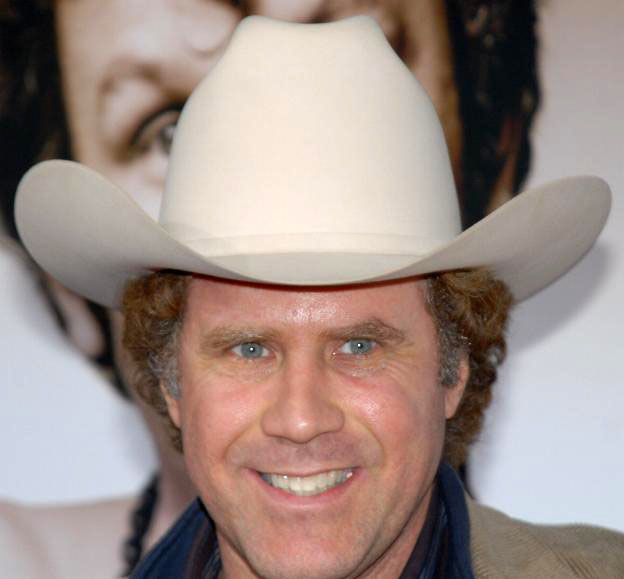
Ferrell at the premiere of Walk Hard: The Dewey Cox Story, December 2007

During his time on Saturday Night Live, Ferrell appeared in several movies: Austin Powers: International Man of Mystery (1997), A Night at the Roxbury (1998), Superstar (1999), The Ladies Man (2000), Dick (1999), Drowning Mona (2000), Austin Powers: The Spy Who Shagged Me (1999), Jay and Silent Bob Strike Back (2001), and Zoolander (2001). His first starring role after his departure from Saturday Night Live was as Frank "The Tank" Richard in Old School (2003). The film "belongs to Mr. Ferrell," declared The New York Times, which described how he "uses his hilarious, anxious zealotry to sell the part." Old School was a success and Ferrell received an MTV Movie Awards nomination for Best Comedic Performance.

The title role in Elf (2003) followed, as did another MTV Movie Awards nomination. Ferrell continued to land comedy roles in 2004 and 2005 in films such as Melinda and Melinda, Anchorman: The Legend of Ron Burgundy, and Starsky & Hutch earning himself a place among Hollywood's Frat Pack. In 2005, Ferrell earned $40 million. In 2006, Ferrell starred in Stranger Than Fiction, Curious George, and Talladega Nights: The Ballad of Ricky Bobby.

Both Stranger Than Fiction and Talladega Nights received critical and box office success, while Curious George was critically lauded but disappointed at the box office. Ferrell's performance in Stranger Than Fiction introduced audiences to Ferrell's dramatic acting abilities, while Talladega Nights was his highest grossing live-action opening as of 2010 at $47 million. On December 27, 2006, The Magazine named Ferrell as one of its three actors of the year in their 2006 year in review issue. A sequel to Anchorman, Anchorman 2: The Legend Continues, was released in 2013.

In 2008, Ferrell starred in the movie Step Brothers with John C. Reilly. The movie also starred Adam Scott, Kathryn Hahn, Mary Steenburgen, and Richard Jenkins. It was directed by frequent Ferrell collaborator Adam McKay, who was also a co-writer of the movie. The movie earned $128 million worldwide. The film received mixed reviews but has since become a cult classic. Chris Hewitt of Empire praised the chemistry of the two leads writing, "Ferrell and Reilly are a superb double-act, Reilly's cockiness meshing well with Ferrell's puppy dog innocence. They're fine separately, but when the two are together, be it during an extended fight scene with a bunch of kids, or a demented sleepwalking sequence, the movie is a blast."

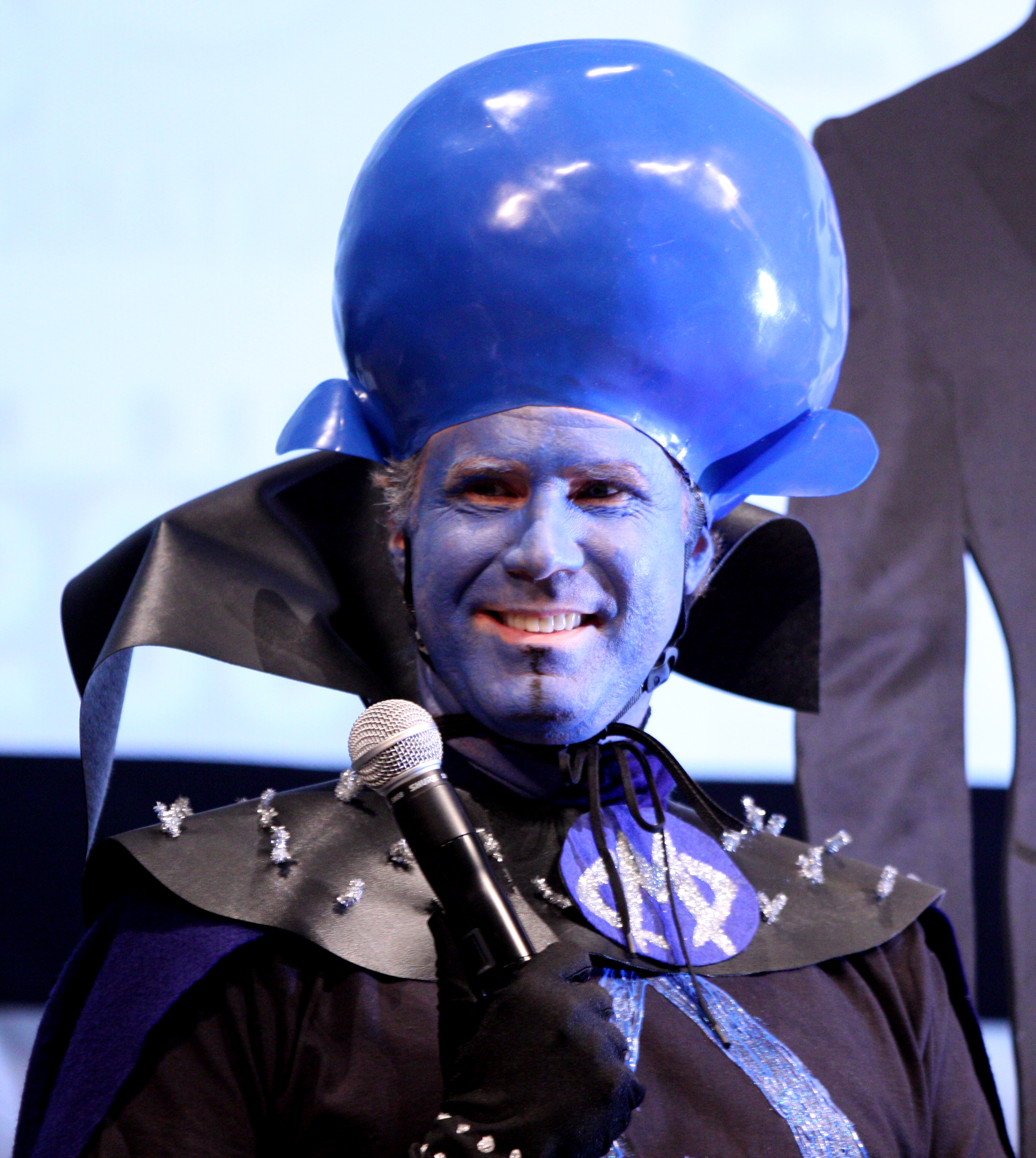
Ferrell dressed as Megamind at the 2010 San Diego Comic-Con.

Ferrell is also known for his promotional appearances including acting as part of a pre-game video package for the Rose Bowl along with University of Texas at Austin alum Matthew McConaughey. Ferrell sang a song at the ESPY Awards in 2006 about Lance Armstrong and Neil Armstrong. He and John C. Reilly performed a spot during the 2008 ESPY Awards where they made demands in order for them to appear at the ESPYs, such as asking Portland Trail Blazers' center Greg Oden to tuck them in at night and tell them stories of the old times or to bring back the Cold War so the Olympics could be interesting again. Ferrell has worked as a voice actor in several animated television programs and films, including his portrayal of Bob Oblong, a 1950s-style father with no arms or legs, in the short-lived animated television series The Oblongs which ran on The WB and Adult Swim.

He has had several guest appearances on Family Guy where he played the Black Knight in "Mr. Saturday Knight", as well as Fat Greek Guy and Miles "Chatterbox" Musket in Fifteen Minutes of Shame.

He had a recurring cameo role as Bitch Hunter in the sitcom 30 Rock. Ferrell also starred as Ted (a.k.a. The Man in the Yellow Hat) in the film Curious George and guest voiced on an episode of the Fox sitcom King of the Hill as a politically correct soccer coach. He voiced the title character in the 2010 DreamWorks Animation feature film Megamind (replacing both Robert Downey Jr., who dropped out due to scheduling conflicts, and Ben Stiller, who also turned down the role and was instead cast in a minor role as Bernard the curator) as well as President Business in The Lego Movie, released in 2014. He reprised the latter role in The Lego Movie 2: The Second Part, released in 2019.

Ferrell has presented numerous times at the Academy Awards. He sang a humorous song "Get Off the Stage" with Jack Black in 2004 and sang a song about comedies being snubbed by the voters in favor of dramas with John C. Reilly and Jack Black in 2007. Ferrell made his Broadway debut taking on departing U.S. President George W. Bush in a one-man show called You're Welcome America. A Final Night with George W. Bush. The show started performances on January 20, 2009, in previews—Bush's final day in office—at the Cort Theatre and opened officially on February 1. The limited engagement played through March 15, 2009.

In May 2009, it was announced that Ferrell was in talks to star in a feature film, Neighborhood Watch (later The Watch), a comedy about an urbanite who moves to the suburbs and uncovers a conspiracy. In negotiations to direct was David Dobkin, who gave Ferrell a cameo in Wedding Crashers. In August 2009, Ferrell decided not to do the film. Ferrell also starred as Rick Marshall in the feature film Land of the Lost (2009). The film was a commercial failure, earning $19 million on opening weekend—about two-thirds of what the studio expected. In 2010, he was the executive producer and star of The Other Guys, a buddy cop film with an ensemble cast including Mark Wahlberg, Eva Mendes, Michael Keaton, Steve Coogan, Ray Stevenson, Samuel L. Jackson, and Dwayne Johnson. The film was a commercial success, earning over $140 million and was positively reviewed by critics.

=== 2011–2019: Career expansion ===
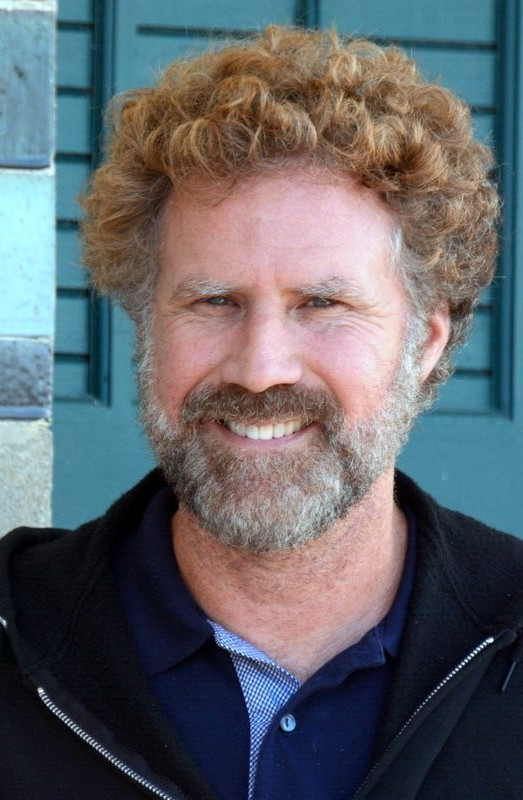
Ferrell in 2014

Ferrell appeared in the 2011 music video for "Make Some Noise" by the Beastie Boys, playing a cowbell in front of a limo. He starred, along with Mexican stars Diego Luna and Gael García Bernal in Casa de Mi Padrea telenovela spoof comedy set on a ranch. The movie is told in melodramatic telenovela form and features English-language subtitles. He starred alongside Zach Galifianakis in the 2012 political comedy The Campaign, which garnered mediocre reviews and grossed $104 million against a budget of $95 million. Also in 2012, he appeared in the comedy Tim and Eric's Billion Dollar Movie and starred as Armando Álvarez in the Spanish-language comedy Casa de Mi Padre which was directed by frequent collaborator Matt Piedmont.

In a 2014 poll taken as part of a commemorative SNL feature on Grantland, Ferrell was voted the best Saturday Night Live cast member of all time. On December 12, 2015, Ferrell appeared in the cold open of the show as George W. Bush. He reprised this role when he returned as host in 2018.

Ferrell and Red Hot Chili Peppers drummer Chad Smith, who have had a long-running joke feud over their similar appearance, appeared on the May 22, 2014, episode of The Tonight Show Starring Jimmy Fallon for a charity drum-off battle. Despite Smith clearly giving the better performance, Ferrell was named the winner and awarded a giant gold cowbell. Both were joined by Smith's Red Hot Chili Peppers bandmates for a performance of "Don't Fear the Reaper", with Ferrell playing cowbell. On June 10, 2014, Ferrell and Smith challenged Metallica drummer Lars Ulrich to a drum-off with Ferrell, saying Ulrich looks "eerily similar" to the two of them. Ulrich accepted the challenge two days later.

In 2015, he starred in the buddy comedy Get Hard and the comedy Daddy's Home, with the latter reuniting him and The Other Guys co-star Mark Wahlberg. He reprised his role as Jacobim Mugatu in the Zoolander sequel, Zoolander 2 (2016). He then reprised his role from Daddy's Home in the sequel, Daddy's Home 2 (2017).

In 2014, Ferrell filmed a role for the comedy-drama Zeroville, based on the novel of the same name. The film's release was delayed until 2019. Also in 2014, Ferrell signed on to portray director Russ Meyer in Russ and Roger Go Beyond, a comedic biopic documenting the making of Beyond the Valley of the Dolls, alongside Josh Gad as Roger Ebert. In 2018, prior to filming, the project was cancelled due to the recent #MeToo movement and Meyer's association with sexploitation filmmaking.

In February 2019, Ferrell launched The Ron Burgundy Podcast in collaboration with the iHeart Radio Podcast Network. The show was originally slated for two seasons of twelve episodes each. In 2022, the podcast was renewed for a fifth live season. In October 2019, Ferrell partnered with iHeart Radio to launch his own podcast network, the Big Money Players Network. The partnership deal included 10 scripted and unscripted comedy podcasts set to be released over a two-year period.

=== 2020–present ===
In 2020 Ferrell starred alongside Julia Louis-Dreyfus in the remake of the 2014 Swedish film Force Majeure, entitled Downhill which was directed by Nat Faxon and Jim Rash. That same year he starred in the musical comedy film Eurovision Song Contest: The Story of Fire Saga with Rachel McAdams. In 2022 he starred in the Apple TV+ musical comedy film Spirited with Ryan Reynolds. He also served as the film's producer. The next year he played the CEO of Mattel in Greta Gerwig's comedy film Barbie (2023) starring Margot Robbie and Ryan Gosling; the same year he produced and starred in the film Quiz Lady. In 2024, Ferrell co-starred in a Netflix documentary Will & Harper, where Ferrell joins his best friend Harper Steele, who had recently come out to him a trans woman. The two take a road trip to rediscover each other.

== Other ventures ==
In April 2007, Ferrell and Adam McKay launched "Funny or Die", a streaming video website where short comedy films are uploaded and voted on by users. One of the featured shorts, The Landlord, stars Ferrell as a man harassed for the rent by his landlady, a swearing, beer-loving, two-year-old girl, played by McKay's own daughter, Pearl. Child psychologists have criticized Ferrell and the McKay family for child exploitation, to which McKay responded, "Fortunately she is in this great stage now where she repeats anything you say to her and then forgets it right away, which is key. She has not said the 'B-word' since we shot the thing." They followed with the release of a video entitled "Good Cop, Baby Cop" which also starred baby Pearl; the end of the video stated that this would be her final appearance and wished her a happy "baby retirement".

In September 2008, Ferrell released another video entitled "Will Ferrell Answers Internet Questions" where he took some pressing questions and comments from his fans. Another Ferrell appearance on "Funny or Die" is in the video called "Green Team", featuring also McKay and John C. Reilly. It shows militant ecological activists terrorizing the crew on a film set.

Ferrell co-produced (with McKay) an HBO show starring Danny McBride called Eastbound & Down. He also had a recurring role as car dealer Ashley Schaeffer.

Ferrell was one of the executive producers of The Chris Gethard Show, which aired on Fusion from 2015 to 2016 and on truTV from 2017 to 2018.

Ferrell was one of the executive producers of Dead to Me (2019–2022), which stars Christina Applegate and Linda Cardellini.

In 2019, Ferrell ended his personal and professional relationship with McKay and closed their production company, Gary Sanchez Productions. It was later revealed the reason for the split was due to the fact that, without informing Ferrell, McKay cast John C. Reilly as Jerry Buss on the show Winning Time: The Rise of the Lakers Dynasty, a role that Ferrell wanted.

== Personal life ==
In August 2000, Ferrell married Swedish actress Viveca Paulin, whom he met in 1995 at an acting class. They live in New York City and Orange County, California, and have three sons, born in 2004, 2006, and 2010.

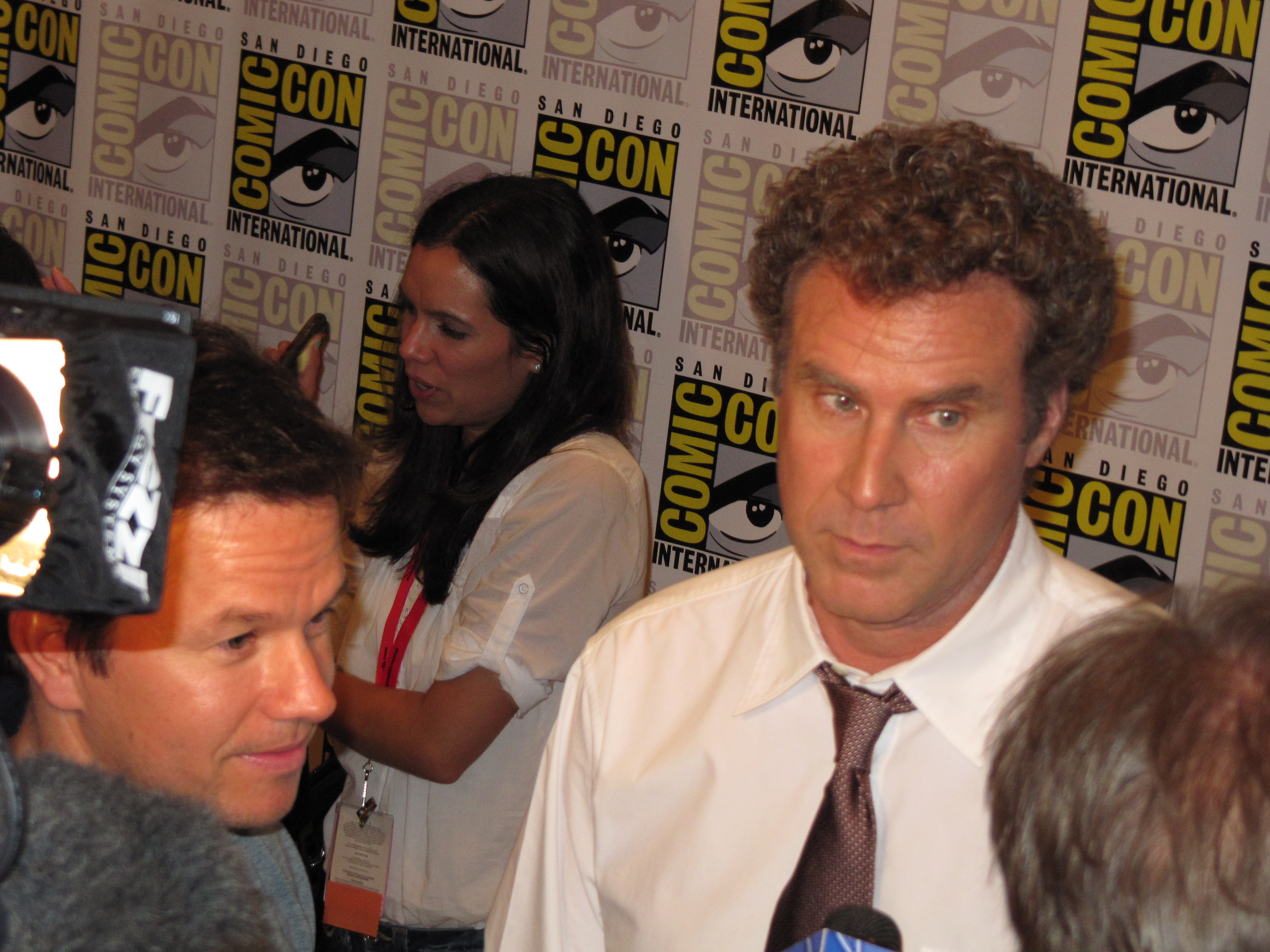
Ferrell at the 2010 San Diego Comic-Con with Mark Wahlberg

At USC, Ferrell was a member of Delta Tau Delta fraternity and is now an active alumnus. Ferrell has worked with former head coach Pete Carroll to do motivational stunts for the players during the season.

Ferrell has run multiple marathons, including the Boston, New York, and Stockholm marathons. He also raises money for charity, including his Scholarships for Cancer Survivors campaign, through a micro-donations fundraising platform.

In 2007, Autograph magazine named Ferrell the worst celebrity autographer. Its editor stated: "What's so frustrating about Will Ferrell being the worst autograph signer this past year is that he used to be so nice to fans and collectors and a great signer. What makes him so bad is that he'll taunt people asking for his autograph." In response, Ferrell stated: "I don't know how I got on the list. I sign a lot of autographs." He has, however, admitted to taunting autograph-seekers: "I do. I really do. I'm like, 'How badly do you want this autograph?' 'Are you sure?' 'You say you're my biggest fan, really, prove it.' I'll do things like that. They have to earn it."

On January 7, 2016, it was announced that Ferrell would become a part-owner of Los Angeles FC, a Major League Soccer team set to begin playing in 2018, as one of several celebrity co-owners of the team (including Mia Hamm and Magic Johnson).

On May 12, 2017, Ferrell was awarded an honorary D.H.L. degree by the University of Southern California.

On April 13, 2018, Ferrell was involved in a serious two-car collision in California. The SUV he was a passenger in flipped over during the crash. Ferrell was one of three passengers in the car. Ferrell, along with another passenger, was unhurt in the accident; two others were injured.

=== Political views ===
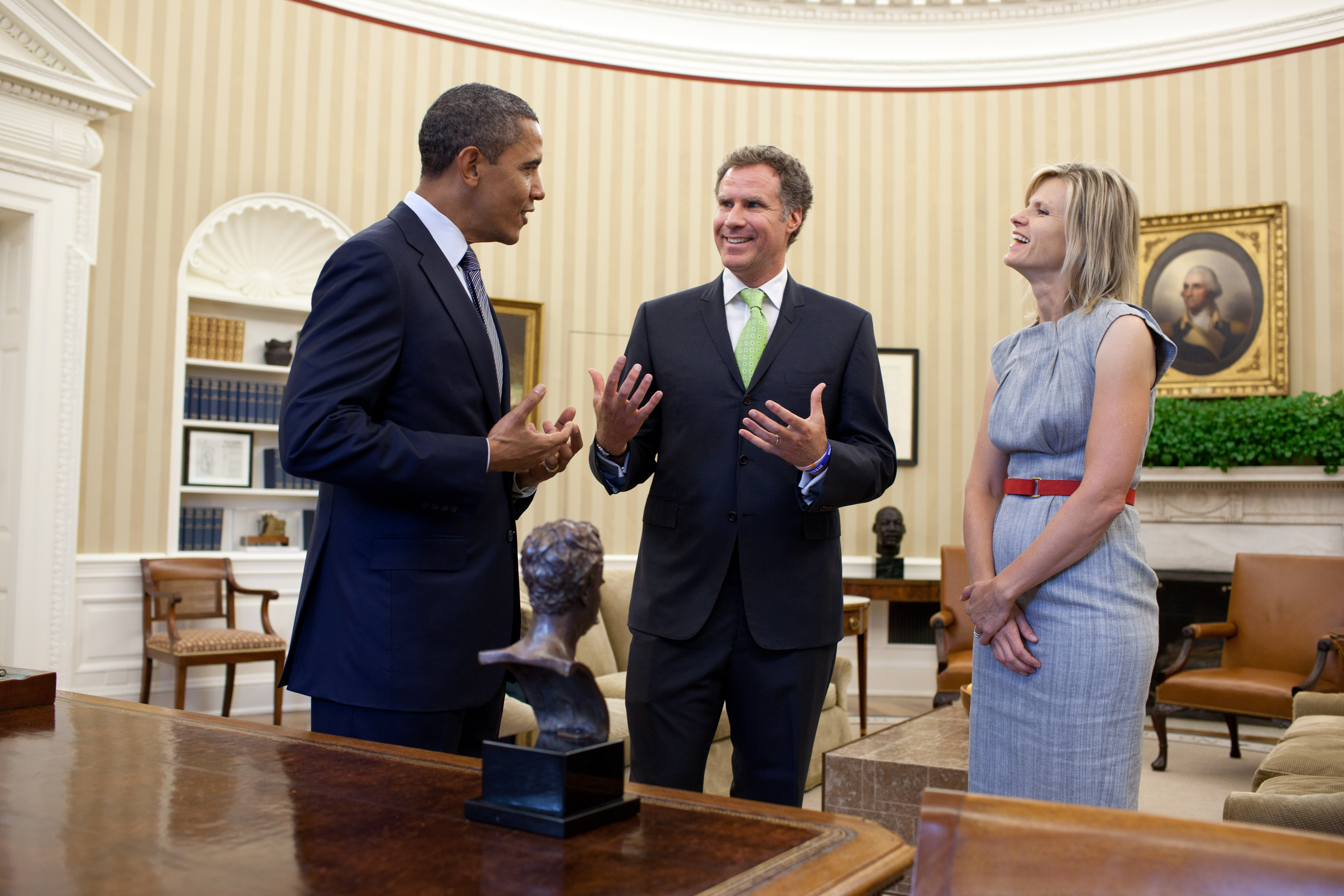
President Barack Obama with Ferrell and Viveca Paulin in 2011

Ferrell is a supporter of the Democratic Party and has made several public comments and appearances relaying such.

Though he was well known for his SNL impersonation of President George W. Bush, Ferrell noted that he chose, for both professional and political reasons, not to meet the president on several occasions. Unlike his SNL predecessor Dana Carvey's famous relationship with George H. W. Bush, Ferrell has said: "I declined, partly out of comedic purposes, because when I was on the show Saturday Night Live at the time, it didn't make sense to really meet the people that you play, for fear of them influencing you. And then the other side of it is, from a political standpoint, I don't want to meet that guy."

Ferrell supported Barack Obama in the 2012 presidential election and met him (along with his wife, Michelle) in 2011.

In February 2013, Ferrell endorsed Eric Garcetti for mayor of Los Angeles.

In 2018, Ferrell canvassed on behalf of the party in the state of Georgia.

Days before election day in 2024, Ferrell appeared in a Kamala Harris advertisement, encouraging voter turnout for the candidate.

=== Sports ===
==== Baseball ====
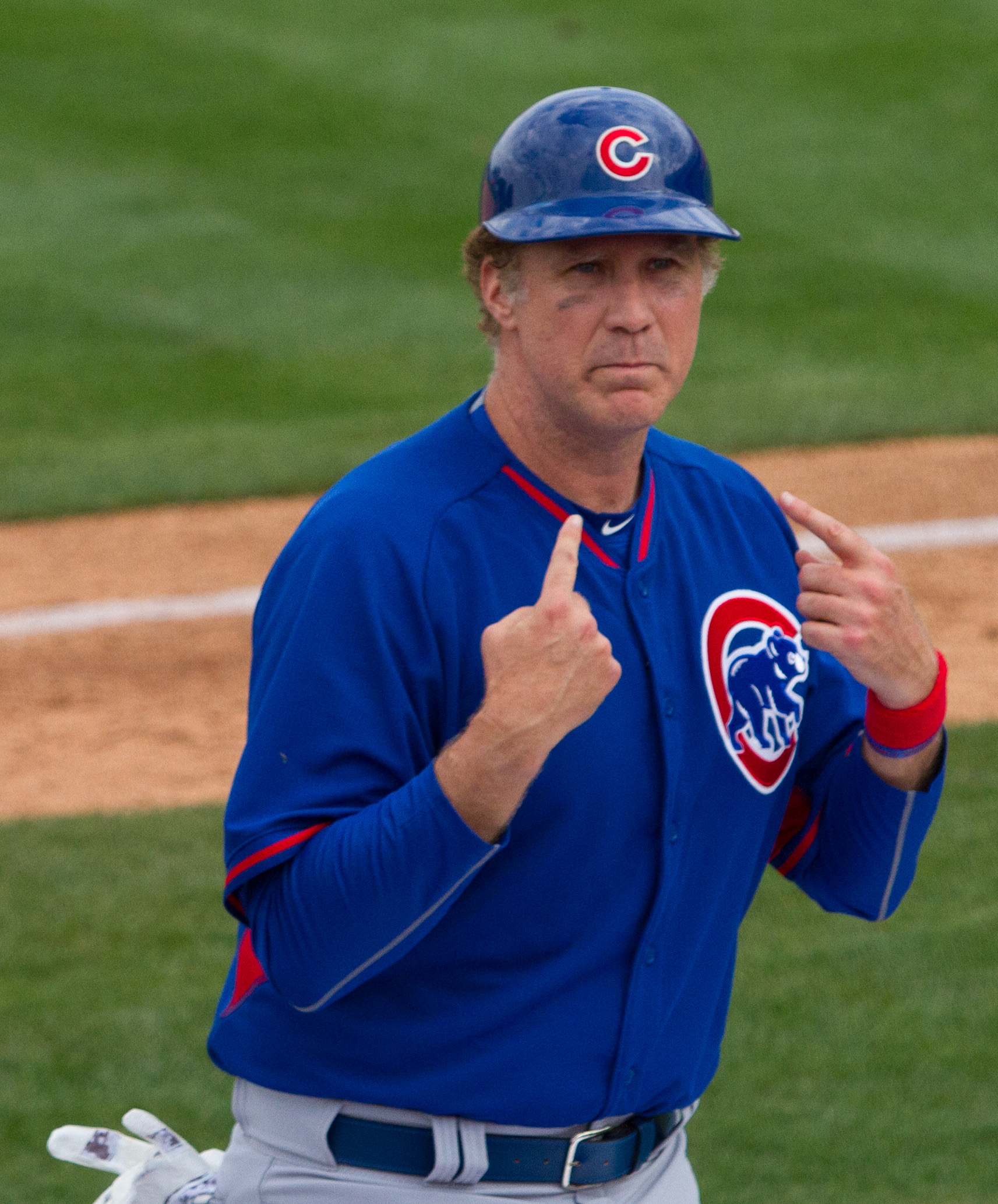
Ferrell coaching third base for the Chicago Cubs during a spring training game in 2015

On May 6, 2010, at a Minor League Baseball game at Dell Diamond in Round Rock, Texas, Ferrell was introduced between innings as a Venezuelan pitcher for the Round Rock Express named "Billy Ray 'RoJo' Johnson". Wearing a false mustache and carrying a bag of beer cans to the mound, Ferrell threw one pitch and was ejected after a staged fight and chase with an opposing batter. He revealed himself to the fans when his moustache fell off during the chase. A video of the skit went viral. The appearance was conceived by Ferrell and the Express, who sent out a press release announcing Johnson's "signing" to promote a charity golf outing the following day at a nearby country club.

Ferrell played in five games of Major League Baseball spring training on March 12, 2015, for ten different Cactus League teams as a promotion for a Funny or Die charity special. He played for the Arizona Diamondbacks, Los Angeles Angels, Los Angeles Dodgers, San Diego Padres, Cincinnati Reds, Oakland Athletics, Seattle Mariners, Chicago Cubs, Chicago White Sox, and the San Francisco Giants, playing all ten positions (including designated hitter). According to Baseball-Reference, Ferrell faced and retired one batter – pitching on behalf of the Dodgers and ending with a 0.00 earned run average. The memorabilia from his one-day professional baseball career was sold and the proceeds donated to two cancer charities. Ferrell went 0–2 with two strikeouts that day but managed to foul off a 92 mph (148 km/h) fastball from the Giants' Jean Machi.

==== Ice hockey ====
Ferrell is an avid fan of the Los Angeles Kings of the National Hockey League (NHL) and frequently partners with the club and attends games while seated in the front row. Ferrell has produced several video messages which the Kings have aired on the jumbotron during games throughout the years.

Ferrell has taken an active role in the Kings' fandom. During the 2023 playoffs matchups between the Kings and Edmonton Oilers, Ferrell appeared in his usual front row seats donning checkered faceprint in the Kings' colors, which circulated and drew parodies around the NHL.

In a March 21, 2019, game between the Kings and San Jose Sharks, Ferrell commentated the entire second period of the match on the local television broadcast in-character as Ron Burgundy. For the 2023–24 NHL season, Kings goaltender Cam Talbot, although himself not a member of the team at the time of the broadcast, bore a depiction of Burgundy in reference to the event.

==== Soccer ====
Ferrell took part in Soccer Aid 2012. In 2016, he became a part-owner of Los Angeles FC, which competes in Major League Soccer. When asked about why he became a co-owner, Ferrell said, "I don't really have a side per se until LAFC get started and that will definitely be, obviously, my team. But I just enough watching [sic] the fact that it's played all over the world. So many amazing players and so many top flight leagues. And hopefully MLS can be on par, eventually, with the European leagues."

Ferrell is a minority shareholder in the Premier League soccer club Leeds United.

== Filmography ==
Selected filmography
- Saturday Night Live (1995–2002)
- Austin Powers: International Man of Mystery (1997)
- A Night at the Roxbury (1998)
- Superstar (1999)
- Austin Powers: The Spy Who Shagged Me (1999)
- Zoolander (2001)
- Old School (2003)
- Elf (2003)
- Anchorman: The Legend of Ron Burgundy (2004)
- The Producers (2005)
- Bewitched (2005)
- Kicking & Screaming (2005)
- Stranger Than Fiction (2006)
- Talladega Nights: The Ballad of Ricky Bobby (2006)
- Curious George (2006)
- Blades of Glory (2007)
- Semi-Pro (2008)
- Step Brothers (2008)
- Land of the Lost (2009)
- Everything Must Go (2010)
- The Other Guys (2010)
- Megamind (2010)
- The Campaign (2012)
- Anchorman 2: The Legend Continues (2013)
- The Lego Movie (2014)
- Get Hard (2015)
- Daddy's Home (2015)
- Zoolander 2 (2016)
- Daddy's Home 2 (2017)
- Holmes & Watson (2018)
- The Lego Movie 2: The Second Part (2019)
- Eurovision Song Contest: The Story of Fire Saga (2020)
- Spirited (2022)
- Barbie (2023)
- Despicable Me 4 (2024)
- Will & Harper (2024)
- You're Cordially Invited (2025)

== Awards and honors ==
Over his career Ferrell has received various awards nominations including sixteen Primetime Emmy Award nominations winning three awards, one for Succession (2020), and twice for Live in Front of a Studio Audience (2019, 2020). Ferrell received two Golden Globe Award nominations for his comedian performances in The Producers (2005), and Stranger than Fiction (2006). He also received a Tony Award nomination for Best Special Theatrical Event for You're Welcome America. A Final Night with George W Bush (2009).

Ferrell also has received various honors including the James Joyce Award from the University College Dublin's Literary and Historical Society in recognition for "excelling in his field" in 2008. In 2011, he was awarded the Mark Twain Prize for American Humor. Ferrell received the prize at a ceremony at the John F. Kennedy Center for the Performing Arts where he was honored by fellow comedians and collaborators Conan O'Brien, John C. Reilly, Ben Stiller, Jack Black, Paul Rudd, Adam McKay, Tim Meadows, Matthew Broderick, and Ed Asner. In 2015, Ferrell received a Star on the Hollywood Walk of Fame for his work in motion pictures.

In 2022, Los Angeles F.C. of Major League Soccer (MLS) – of which Ferrell is part owner – won the MLS Cup, thus giving him an MLS championship to his credit.
