= Adam McKay =

American filmmaker (born 1968)

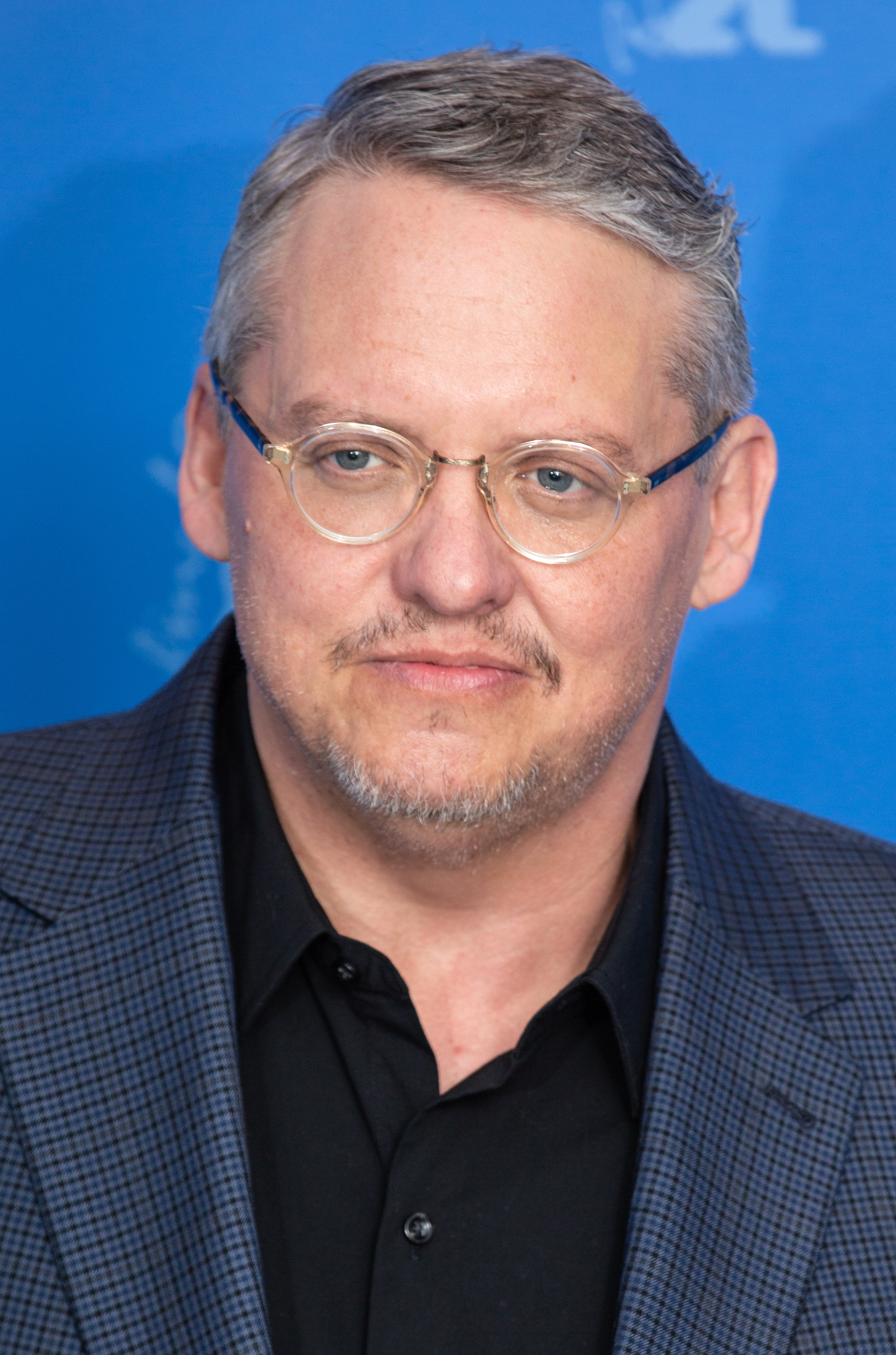
- McKay in 2019
- Born: April 17, 1968 (age 58); Denver, Colorado, U.S.
- Occupations: Screenwriter; director; producer
- Years active: 1986–present
- Organization: Hyperobject Industries
- Spouse: Shira Piven (m. 1999)
- Children: 2
- Relatives: Jeremy Piven (brother-in-law)
- Awards: Full list

Adam McKay (born April 17, 1968) is an American filmmaker. McKay began his career in the 1990s as a head writer for the NBC sketch comedy show Saturday Night Live (SNL). After leaving SNL, McKay collaborated with comedian Will Ferrell on his comedy films in the 2000s such as Anchorman: The Legend of Ron Burgundy (2004), Talladega Nights: The Ballad of Ricky Bobby (2006), Step Brothers (2008), and The Other Guys (2010). Ferrell and McKay co-wrote and co-produced six television series and films, with McKay himself co-producing their website Funny or Die through their company, Gary Sanchez Productions.

Aside from working with Ferrell, McKay wrote and directed the satirical films The Big Short (2015), Vice (2018), and Don't Look Up (2021). He won an Academy Award, a BAFTA, and a Critics' Choice Award for adapting the screenplay of The Big Short. In 2019, McKay founded the production company Hyperobject Industries.

== Early life and education ==
Adam McKay was born in Denver, Colorado, and raised in Worcester, Massachusetts and later Malvern, Pennsylvania by his mother, Sarah, a waitress, and his father, a musician. When McKay was seven his parents divorced.

McKay attended Great Valley High School in Malvern, where he graduated in 1986. He then attended Penn State University for a year prior to transferring to Temple University, where he majored in English. McKay dropped out of Temple a semester-and-a-half before he was set to earn his bachelor's degree. He described it as "settling with an imaginary degree".

== Career ==
McKay studied under Del Close at The Second City and then joined The Second City Touring Company. He performed in one revue as a member of the Second City e.t.c. company and filled in on the Mainstage in the 79th Review before moving fully to the Mainstage for Second City's 80th revue, Piñata Full of Bees. The landmark show also featured Jon Glaser, Rachel Dratch, and Scott Adsit.

McKay is one of the founding members of the Upright Citizens Brigade improv comedy group and a former performer at Chicago's ImprovOlympic, where he was a member of the improv group, The Family, whose members included Matt Besser, Ian Roberts, Neil Flynn, Miles Stroth, and Ali Farahnakian, as well as Child's Play Touring Theatre.

=== Saturday Night Live ===
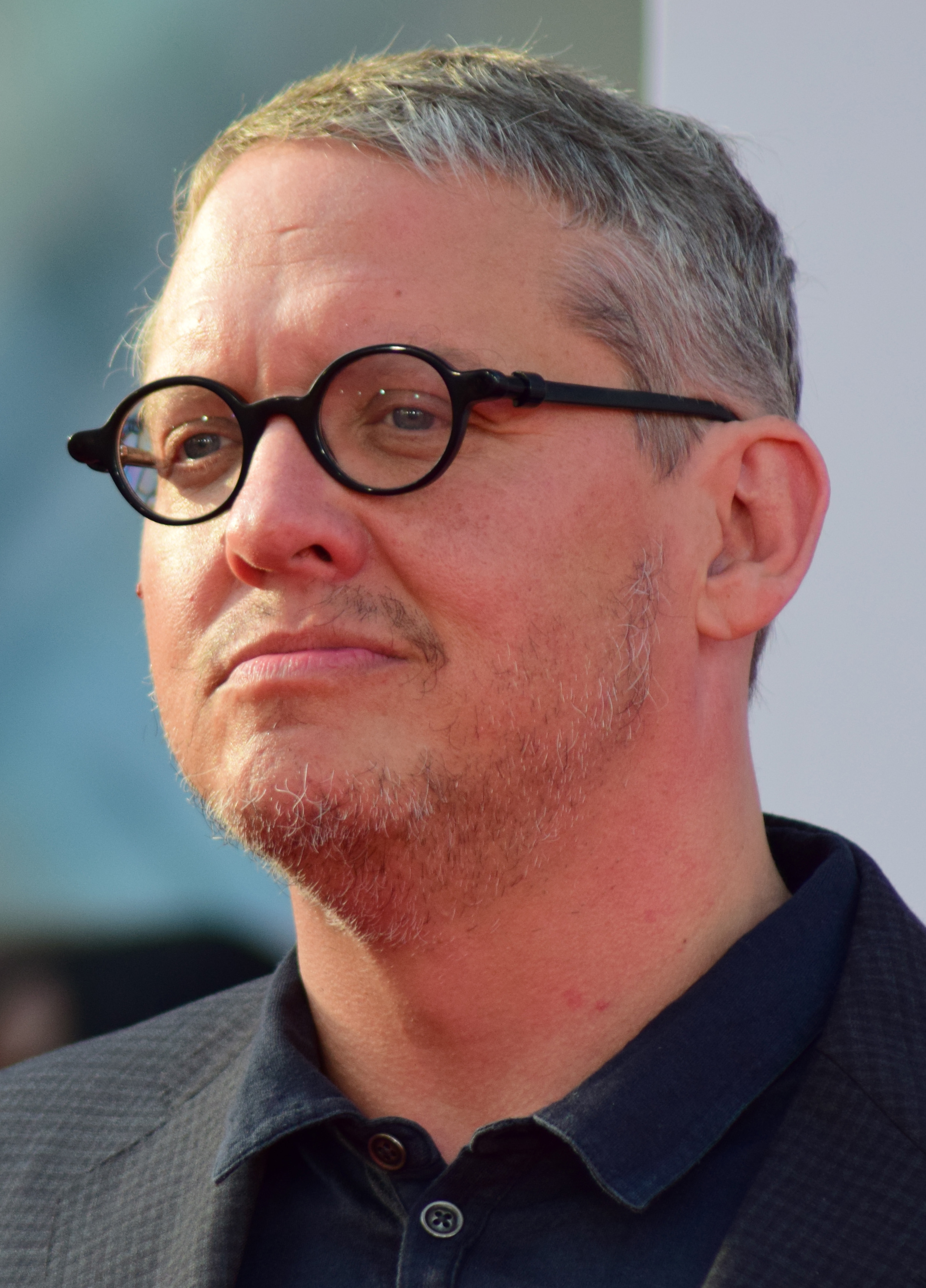
McKay at the Hollywood premiere of Ant-Man in June 2015

McKay originally auditioned for Saturday Night Live to be an onscreen performer, but did not make the cut. However, the scripts he submitted earned him a job as a writer in 1995. Within a year, McKay became head writer at age 28, a position he held until 1999. He also directed a number of short films for the show, including the original SNL Digital Shorts. McKay encouraged his Second City friend Tina Fey to submit some of her scripts to Saturday Night Live, and she later succeeded him as head writer. Despite no longer being head writer, McKay would remain at SNL as a regular writer until 2001, where he would depart from the series, after six years. In his final two years of tenure at SNL, he requested and earned a credit as "Coordinator of Falconry", an honorific credit.

Shortly after leaving SNL, McKay teamed up with comedian Will Ferrell to form production company Gary Sanchez Productions and write the comedy films Anchorman: The Legend of Ron Burgundy (2004), Talladega Nights: The Ballad of Ricky Bobby (2006), Step Brothers (2008), and The Other Guys (2010), all of which he also directed, produced and made cameo appearances in as an actor. Ferrell and McKay co-produced the HBO series Eastbound & Down.

McKay was one of the writers for the film The Campaign (2012), and produced the film Daddy's Home (2015), the latter of which reunited The Other Guys stars Ferrell and Mark Wahlberg, and was directed by Sean Anders. McKay also rewrote the script for the Marvel Studios feature film Ant-Man, directed by Peyton Reed; McKay had initially been in talks to direct the film following Edgar Wright's departure, but opted not to out of respect for Wright. McKay also worked with Reed, Paul Rudd, Gabriel Ferrari and Andrew Barrer on Ant-Man and the Wasp to flesh out the story. He has also expressed interest in helming a Silver Surfer movie for Marvel Studios.

=== Films and television ===
He produced the films Land of the Lost (2009), The Goods: Live Hard, Sell Hard (2009), The Virginity Hit (2010), Casa de Mi Padre (2012), Bachelorette (2012), Tim and Eric's Billion Dollar Movie (2012), The Campaign (2012), Hansel & Gretel: Witch Hunters (2013), Tammy (2014), Welcome to Me (2014), Get Hard (2015), Sleeping with Other People (2015), Daddy's Home (2015), and The Boss (2016). In addition to Eastbound & Down, McKay has produced the television series Big Lake and Succession, whose pilot he directed, and the miniseries The Spoils of Babylon, and The Chris Gethard Show.

In April 2019, McKay and Ferrell announced that they were separating as producing partners but would continue producing all projects currently in development or in production at Gary Sanchez Productions. It was later revealed the reason for the split was because McKay cast John C. Reilly as Jerry Buss on the show Winning Time: The Rise of the Lakers Dynasty, a role that Ferrell had coveted, without informing him.

=== Hyperobject Industries ===
In 2019, McKay launched a new production company, Hyperobject Industries, which has a first look overall television deal with HBO and had a first-look feature deal at Paramount Pictures. Hyperobject Industries' first television project was an HBO pilot based on Jeff Pearlman's non-fiction book Showtime: Magic, Kareem, Riley and the Los Angeles Lakers Dynasty of the 1980s. McKay directed the pilot. More recently, McKay's Hyperobject Industries has a first look deal with Apple.

=== Directing ===
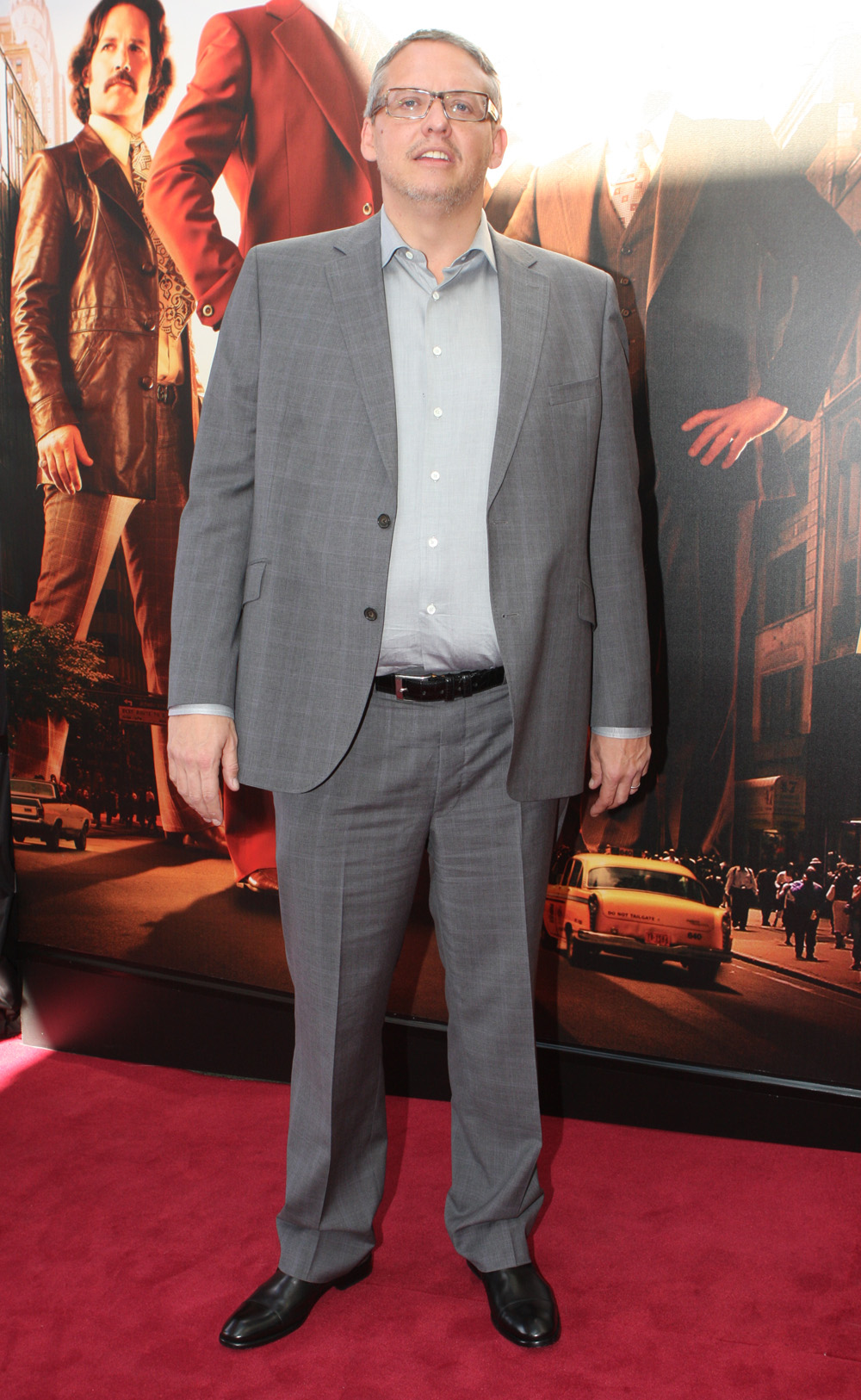
McKay at the Australian premiere of Anchorman 2 in November 2013

McKay has directed, and co-written with Will Ferrell, the films Anchorman: The Legend of Ron Burgundy (2004), Talladega Nights: The Ballad of Ricky Bobby (2006), Step Brothers (2008), The Other Guys (2010), and Anchorman 2: The Legend Continues (2013). He has directed an "alternate film" about Ron Burgundy that is considered a companion to Anchorman: The Legend of Ron Burgundy (2004) entitled Wake Up, Ron Burgundy: The Lost Movie (2004), which is made up mostly of alternative takes, deleted scenes, and scrapped sub-plots from the original film strung together with a narrative.

McKay directed and co-wrote with Ferrell the George W. Bush Broadway show You're Welcome America. He produced the horror-action film Hansel & Gretel: Witch Hunters.

McKay directed the TV movie documentary Lifecasters (2013). He has directed a number of short films, including digital shorts for Saturday Night Live, and the short video "Good Cop, Baby Cop" for Funny or Die that stars his daughter Pearl. Among the other short films he has directed include The Procedure (2007) starring Will Ferrell, Willem Dafoe, and Andy Richter, Green Team (2008) starring Ferrell, John C. Reilly, and himself, and the K-Swiss commercial, Kenny Powers: The K-Swiss MFCEO (2011), starring Danny McBride as Kenny Powers from Eastbound & Down, which he co-produces with Ferrell and has also directed an episode of.

He directed and wrote the film adaptation of the Michael Lewis non-fiction book The Big Short, about the 2008 financial crisis, and the build-up of the financial and credit bubble. The film opened in limited release on December 11, 2015, expanded to wide release on December 23, 2015; the film starred Brad Pitt, Christian Bale, Ryan Gosling, and Steve Carell. He received a nomination for the Academy Award for Best Director and the Academy Award for Best Adapted Screenplay for his work in the film, winning his first Academy Award in the latter category. In 2016, he and co-writer Charles Randolph received the USC Scripter Award for their screenplay.

In 2016, he became attached to the superhero film Irredeemable based on the comic of the same name by Mark Waid. In November 2016, McKay began development of the biographical black comedy Backseat, about former U.S. Vice President Dick Cheney and his rise to power, though the title was eventually changed to Vice. Starring Christian Bale as Cheney, the film was released in the United States on December 25, 2018, by Annapurna Pictures. Despite polarized reviews, Vice received eight nominations at the 91st Academy Awards, including the Best Picture and McKay's second nomination for Best Director, and won for Best Make-Up and Hairstyling.

In 2020, McKay began working on the satirical black comedy Don't Look Up, about two low level scientists trying to convince the world that a catastrophic comet is coming. McKay wrote the script and produced the film for Netflix. Jennifer Lawrence, Leonardo DiCaprio, Jonah Hill, Rob Morgan, Tyler Perry, Meryl Streep, and Cate Blanchett star in the film. It received a limited theatrical release in December 2021, before streaming on Netflix later in the month. The film received four nominations at the 94th Academy Awards, including Best Picture.

McKay was set to work with Jennifer Lawrence for the biographical film Bad Blood, about entrepreneur Elizabeth Holmes, and based on the book Bad Blood: Secrets and Lies in a Silicon Valley Startup. Originally set to be produced by Legendary Pictures and released by Universal Pictures, in December 2021, the project was picked up by Apple Studios. In November 2022, however, Lawrence left the project due to not wanting to copy Amanda Seyfried's performance in The Dropout. The current status of the project is unknown.

In March 2023, it was revealed that McKay's next project would be titled Average Height, Average Build, a political satire focused on a serial killer. The film was set to star Robert Pattinson, Amy Adams, Robert Downey Jr., Forest Whitaker, and Danielle Deadwyler. On April 30, 2023, it was announced the project had been acquired by Netflix. On December 4, 2023, it was announced that McKay had left the project to pursue a film on climate change, and the project was subsequently scrapped. He produced the 2025 documentary You Need This, about the impact of consumerism.

In 2026, it was announced that McKay would direct a sci-fi comedy written by Michael Shanks.

=== Funny or Die ===
In 2007, McKay and Ferrell launched the user-submitted comedy video site Funny or Die. A video on the site, titled The Landlord, features both him and his young daughter, Pearl, whom Ferrell and his wife bait to say curse words. Pearl also starred in a second video titled Good Cop, Baby Cop.

=== Podcasting ===
From November 2015 until October 2016, McKay hosted the science/comedy podcast Surprisingly Awesome with Adam Davidson, produced by Gimlet Media. McKay additionally produced Broken: Jeffrey Epstein and Broken: Seeking Justice, a podcast series that explored the Jeffrey Epstein case. His next podcast project, Death at the Wing, investigated a series of deaths among high-profile young basketball players in the 1980s and 1990s. In February 2022, he appeared as a guest on Smartless, a comedic podcast hosted by Jason Bateman, Will Arnett and Sean Hayes. In 2023, he hosted Death on the Lot about celebrity deaths in Hollywood in the 1950s. In 2025 and 2026 he made several appearances on the Movie Night Extravaganza podcast, both as an interview subject and discussing Nights of Cabiria and Over the Edge as a featured guest.

== Political views ==
McKay supports gun control and abortion rights. He has been critical of former President Bill Clinton. "I legitimately think Bill Clinton is one of the worst presidents in the modern age". McKay criticized Clinton for deregulating banks and for his personal life in light of the MeToo movement. McKay serves on the Creative Council of RepresentUs, a nonpartisan anti-corruption organization. He was a supporter of the Democratic Party and endorsed Bernie Sanders for President of the United States in 2016 and again in 2020. He identifies as a democratic socialist and joined the Democratic Socialists of America in 2019. McKay was criticized for going soft on Democrats for their role in the Iraq War in his film Vice, which he later said was a mistake. "I regret not giving more blame to the Democrats, who went along with the war in Iraq...I made mistakes, read the reviews and went, 'Yes, fair,'" he told Variety in March 2022.

In October 2023, McKay signed the Artists4Ceasefire open letter to US president Joe Biden, calling for a ceasefire of the Israeli bombardment of Gaza. In September 2025, he signed an open pledge with Film Workers for Palestine pledging not to work with Israeli film institutions "that are implicated in genocide and apartheid against the Palestinian people."

On November 6, 2024, after Donald Trump won the 2024 presidential election, McKay announced that he would be leaving the Democratic Party, writing on X: "It is time to abandon the Dem Party. I'm registering Green Party or Working Families. But am open to ideas."

In August 2025, McKay was one of more than 2,300 members of the Writers Guild of America who signed an open letter decrying the actions of Donald Trump's administration, specifically calling out his "unprecedented, authoritarian assault" on free speech.

=== Activism ===
McKay is a prominent voice for climate action. In 2022, he donated $4 million to the Climate Emergency Fund and joined its board of directors. He has also donated to Just Stop Oil.

In 2023, McKay founded Yellow Dot Studios to raise awareness and mobilize action on the climate emergency. The non-profit company produces videos and campaigns to tackle the misinformation promoted by the oil industry.

He has spoken prominently about his experience with climate anxiety and the importance of comedy and humor as tools in addressing the climate crisis, while he has also spoken in support of disruptive climate activism.

== Personal life ==
In 1999, he married Shira Piven, a film and television director. They have two daughters. His brother-in-law is actor Jeremy Piven.

=== Health ===
At age 26, McKay first noticed shaking in his hands while performing with Second City. Around 2000, he was diagnosed with essential tremor. The condition causes his body and voice to quiver. He conducts print interviews lying down and televised ones in a special high backed chair to accommodate his disability.

In 2018, McKay had a heart attack while filming Vice, starring Christian Bale, whose character Dick Cheney has multiple heart attacks in the film. McKay credits Bale's awareness of the symptoms from researching the film with his quick response that got him to the hospital before he incurred any permanent damage. During an interview on the 347th episode of The Empire Film Podcast, McKay said: "Either Christian Bale or Dick Cheney just saved my life."

== Filmography ==
=== Film ===
Year	Title	Director	Writer	Producer	Other
2004	Anchorman: The Legend of Ron Burgundy	Yes	Yes	No	Also executive soundtrack producer
2004	Wake Up, Ron Burgundy: The Lost Movie	Yes	Yes	No	
2006	Talladega Nights: The Ballad of Ricky Bobby	Yes	Yes	Executive	Also songwriter
2008	Step Brothers	Yes	Yes	Executive	Also songwriter
2010	The Other Guys	Yes	Yes	Yes	Also songwriter
2012	The Campaign	No	Story	Yes	
2013	Anchorman 2: The Legend Continues	Yes	Yes	Yes	Also executive soundtrack producer and songwriter
2015	Get Hard	No	Story	Yes	
2015	Ant-Man	No	Yes	No	
2015	The Big Short	Yes	Yes	No	
2018	Ant-Man and the Wasp	No	Uncredited	No	
2018	Vice	Yes	Yes	Yes	
2021	Don't Look Up	Yes	Yes	Yes	

Producer only

- The Goods: Live Hard, Sell Hard (2009)
- The Virginity Hit (2010)
- Casa de Mi Padre (2011)
- Bachelorette (2012)
- Tim and Eric's Billion Dollar Movie (2012)
- Hansel & Gretel: Witch Hunters (2013)
- Tammy (2014)
- Welcome to Me (2014)
- Sleeping with Other People (2015)
- Daddy's Home (2015)
- The Boss (2016)
- The House (2017)
- Daddy's Home 2 (2017)
- Ibiza (2018)
- Holmes & Watson (2018)
- Hustlers (2019)
- Barb and Star Go to Vista Del Mar (2021)
- Fresh (2022)
- The Menu (2022)
- Wild Wild Space (2024)
- You Need This (2025)
- Thrash (2026)
- Go Deep: The DeSean Jackson Story (2026)
- Flesh of the Gods (TBA)
- Monsanto (TBA)

Executive producer only

- Land of the Lost (2009)
- The Dictator (2012)
- The Yes Men Are Revolting (2014) (Documentary)
- Grimsby (2016)
- Oh Lucy! (2017)
- Booksmart (2019)
- Eurovision Song Contest: The Story of Fire Saga (2020)
- BS High (2023)
- Wild Summon (2023)

Acting roles

Year	Title	Role
2002	God Hates Cartoons	Uncle Gabby
2003	Pushing Tom	The Boss
2003	Felicia and the Great Quebec	Big Dick Cash
2004	Anchorman: The Legend of Ron Burgundy	Custodian
2004	Wake Up, Ron Burgundy: The Lost Movie	Custodian
2006	Talladega Nights: The Ballad of Ricky Bobby	Terry Cheveaux
2008	Step Brothers	Man without Glasses
2010	The Other Guys	Dirty Mike

=== Television ===
Year	Title	Director	Executive producer	Writer	Notes
1995–2001	Saturday Night Live	Yes	No	Yes	Also credited as "Coordinator of Falconry"
2009–2013	Eastbound & Down	Yes	Yes	No	Directed episode: "Chapter 5"
2010–2011	Funny or Die Presents	Yes	Yes	Yes	
2013	Lifecasters	Yes	No	No	Documentary film
2018–2023	Succession	Yes	Yes	No	Directed episode: "Celebration"
2022–2023	Winning Time: The Rise of the Lakers Dynasty	Yes	Yes	No	Directed episode: "The Swan"

Executive producer only

Year	Title	Notes
2010	Big Lake	
2013–2019	Drunk History	
2014	The Spoils of Babylon	
2014–2015	Bad Judge	
2015	The Spoils Before Dying	
2015	A Deadly Adoption	Television film
2015–2017	The Chris Gethard Show	
2017–2018	I Love You, America with Sarah Silverman	
2017–2019	I'm Sorry	
2017–2021	No Activity	
2018	LA to Vegas	
2019	Live in Front of a Studio Audience	Television specials
2019–2022	Dead to Me	
2020	Robbie	
2020–2022	Motherland: Fort Salem	
2021	Q: Into the Storm	Television documentary
2022	The Invisible Pilot	Television documentary
2025	The Chair Company	
2026	Get Huge: Looksmaxxing to Death	Television documentary

Acting roles

Year	Title	Role	Notes
1995–2001	Saturday Night Live	Various	15 episodes (uncredited)
2007	Human Giant	Alan Harkett (voice)	Episode "24 Hour Marathon"

=== Web ===
Year	Title	Director	Producer	Writer	Actor	Notes
2007	The Procedure	Yes	Yes	Yes	No	
2007	The Landlord	No	Yes	Yes	Yes	Role: Friend
2007	Good Cop, Baby Cop	Yes	Yes	Yes	Yes	Role: Policeman
2008	Green Team	Yes	Yes	Yes	Yes	Role: Erin Gossamer
2008	Paris Hilton Responds to McCain Ad	No	Yes	Yes	No	
2008	Ron Howard's Call to Action	No	Yes	Yes	No	
2008–2016	Between Two Ferns with Zach Galifianakis	No	No	Yes	No	
2010	Presidential Reunion	No	No	Yes	No	
2010	Will Ferrell's NYPD Recruitment Video	No	No	Yes	No	
2011	A Public Statement from Anthony Weiner's Penis	No	No	Yes	No	
2014	COPS: Ferguson	No	No	Yes	No	
2015	Mexican Donald Trump	No	No	Yes	No	
2017	The President's Sun	No	No	Yes	No	

== Awards and nominations ==
Awards and nominations received for films directed by McKay
Year	Title	Academy Awards		BAFTA Awards		Golden Globe Awards	
Year	Title	Nominations	Wins	Nominations	Wins	Nominations	Wins
2015	The Big Short	5	1	4	1	4	
2018	Vice	8	1	6	1	6	1
2021	Don't Look Up	4		4		4	
Total		17	2	14	2	14	1

Directed Academy Award performances
Under McKay's direction, these actors have received Academy Award nominations for their performances in their respective roles.

Year	Performer	Film	Result
Academy Award for Best Actor
2019	Christian Bale	Vice	Nominated
Academy Award for Best Supporting Actor
2016	Christian Bale	The Big Short	Nominated
2019	Sam Rockwell	Vice	Nominated
Academy Award for Best Supporting Actress
2019	Amy Adams	Vice	Nominated
