= The Landlord (2007 film) =

2007 short film directed by Adam McKay

- Directed by: Adam McKay; Drew Antzis
- Written by: Adam McKay; Will Ferrell
- Starring: Will Ferrell; Pearl McKay; Adam McKay
- Cinematography: Drew Antzis
- Edited by: Drew Antzis
- Distributed by: Funny or Die
- Release date: April 17, 2007
- Running time: 2:24 minutes
- Language: English

The Landlord is a 2007 short comedy film starring Will Ferrell, Pearl McKay, and featuring Adam McKay.

== Plot ==
In the film, Ferrell's character is harassed by his landlord for overdue rent money. The landlord is a two-year-old girl (played by McKay's daughter, Pearl) who dresses as a princess, swears at her tenant and is finally calmed by taking Will's beer.

== Cast ==
- Will Ferrell as Renter
- Adam McKay as Friend
- Pearl McKay as Pearl the Landlord

== Production ==
The film was directed by Adam McKay and Drew Antzis and written by Ferrell and McKay.

== Release ==
The film premiered on April 17, 2007, on Ferrell and McKay's video website Funny or Die. Since its debut, the video has been viewed more than 80 million times, and is a "Chosen One" meaning it was never rated by Funny or Die members. Shortly after, a short film featuring outtakes from the movie premiered.

== Reception ==
In 2007 the Guy's Choice Awards, presented by Spike TV, voted The Landlord "Most Viral Video." Entertainment Weekly put it on its end-of-the-decade, "best-of" list, saying, "The only thing funnier than a foulmouthed 2-year-old? A foulmouthed 2-year-old named Pearl berating Will Ferrell on FunnyOrDie.com."

== Good Cop, Baby Cop ==
In June 2007, Pearl McKay and Will Ferrell reunited for Good Cop, Baby Cop, in which McKay plays a tough police officer who forces Ferrell to sign a confession and smacks Ferrell in the face with a phone and a phone book. This was announced to be Pearl McKay's final performance.

== In popular culture ==
In 2014's Boyhood, Mason (Ellar Coltrane), is seen watching the clip on the Funny or Die website in 2007, when the clip came out.

A brief clip of the video can be seen in The Big Short, also directed by McKay.
