= You're Welcome America =

Play written by Will Ferrell

You're Welcome America. A Final Night with George W. Bush
- Poster for You're Welcome America. A Final Night with George W. Bush
- Original language: English
- Written by: Will Ferrell
- Characters: George W. Bush
- Genre: Comedy

Premiere
- Date: February 5, 2009
- Place: Cort Theatre; New York City

You're Welcome America. A Final Night with George W. Bush is a comedic Broadway play written by and starring American comedian Will Ferrell as George W. Bush, which ran from February 5 to March 15, 2009. The play is directed by Ferrell's long-time comedy partner, Adam McKay, who previously worked with him on his comedy films Anchorman and Talladega Nights. According to a review at The Improper.com, "Combined with lewd humor and an uncanny cast of characters to help him drive home his alter ego's West Texas mannerisms, Ferrell’s showpiece is a true delight."

The play is based on Ferrell's George W. Bush impression, which originated from the NBC sketch comedy show Saturday Night Live (SNL). The show's 26th season marked the first appearance of Ferrell's character, which took place during the controversial 2000 United States presidential election. The play carries over some qualities of Ferrell's character that replicates the same comedic element as seen on the popular late night show.

The play broke the house record at the Cort Theater, taking in $846,507.05 for the week that ended on February 15, 2009. The show was broadcast live on the HBO cable channel, as well as in Canada, on March 14, 2009, at 9:00 p.m. EST. It was released to DVD on November 3, 2009.

== Plot ==
The play starts with President Bush (Ferrell) telling the audience that this is his final farewell to the country. He then makes jokes about his life, such as his college years at Yale, his nickname “Gin and Tonic,” being born in Connecticut, his business that went bankrupt, and the Texas legislation which he as Governor signed into law that designated a day as "Jesus Day." Some of Bush's stories are humorous but false, such as having a sexual relationship with Secretary of State Condoleezza Rice and being AWOL from the Air National Guard. Bush's Secret Service agent Jerry dances onstage (sometimes with Bush's pilot) while Ferrell is offstage changing costume. Bush confronts a heckler in the third row, who is part of the cast. The play also acknowledges the hard decisions Bush faced during his term, such as deciding to send troops to the Middle East.

== Production team ==
=== Cast ===
- Will Ferrell as George W. Bush
- Patrick Ferrell as Jerry, The Secret Service Agent
- Pia Glenn as Condoleezza Rice
- Adam Mucci as Pilot
- Michael Delaney as Audience Heckler

=== Staff ===
- Louis Colaianni: Vocal coach

=== DVD notes ===
Husband and wife performers Kevin Kline and Phoebe Cates are visible in the audience. Also visible in the audience are Edward Norton, Adam Levine, Common, and Serena Williams.

== Reception ==
The play, which took place less than a month after Bush left office, was meant as a final farewell not only to the former president himself but also to Ferrell's impression of the former president.

=== Awards and nominations ===
Award	Category	Nominee(s)	Result
Gold Derby Awards	Best Variety Special	You're Welcome America: A Final Night with George W. Bush	Nominated
Online Film & Television Association	Best Variety, Musical or Comedy Special	You're Welcome America: A Final Night with George W. Bush	Nominated
Primetime Emmy Awards	Outstanding Variety, Music or Comedy Special	Will Ferrell, Adam McKay, Jessica Elbaum, Marty Callner and Randall Gladstein	Nominated
Primetime Emmy Awards	Outstanding Directing for a Variety, Music or Comedy Special	Marty Callner	Nominated
Primetime Emmy Awards	Outstanding Writing for a Variety, Music or Comedy Special	Will Ferrell	Nominated
Tony Awards	Best Special Theatrical Event	You're Welcome America: A Final Night with George W. Bush	Nominated
