= ECNY Awards =

- Awarded for: Best comedy works of previous year
- Country: United States
- First award: 2003

The ECNY Awards (formerly the Emerging Comics of New York Awards) were created by Derrick Gordon to honor rising stars in the New York Comedy world in various genres, including sketch, stand up, improv, musical comedy acts, and video. The awards ran from 2003 to 2011, with the exception of a hiatus in 2006. Nominees are selected by New York audiences and an Industry Committee, and the general public votes online to determine the winners, who are announced at an awards show gala each year.

After a one-year hiatus in 2006, the awards were produced by a new production team consisting of Alex Goldberg, Jon Friedman, Carol Hartsell, Nate Sloan, and Alex Zalben. In 2010, Alex Goldberg left the team and Kambri Crews was added as an Executive Producer.

Winners of ECNY Awards have included:

- Mike Birbiglia (Best Male Stand Up Comedian, 2003)
- Jessi Klein (Best Female Stand Up Comedian, 2003)
- Jake Fogelnest (Best Director, 2003)
- Chelsea Peretti (Best Writer, 2003)
- John Gemberling & Curtis Gwinn (Best Comedy Duo, 2003)
- Dannah Feinglass & Paul Scheer (Best Variety Show Host, 2003)
- Respecto Montalban (Best Improv Group, 2003)
- Mr. A$$ (Best Sketch Group, 2003)
- Eugene Mirman (Best Male Stand Up Comedian, 2004)
- Sara Schaefer (Best Variety Show Host, 2004)
- Eric Appel (Best Technician, 2004)
- The Peoples Improv Theater (Best Venue, 2004)
- Nick Kroll (Best Comedic Video Short, 2004)
- Aziz Ansari (Best Male Stand Up Comedian, 2005)
- Jessi Klein & Nick Kroll (Best Variety Show Host, 2005)
- Casey Wilson & June Diane Raphael (Best Comedy Duo, 2005)
- Jessica Delfino (Best Musical Comedy Act, 2005)
- Brett Gelman (Most F**ed Up Show, 2005)
- Catie Lazarus (Best Comedy Writer, 2005)
- Nick Kroll (Best One-Person Show 2007)
- Harvard Sailing Team (Best Sketch Comedy Group, 2007)
- Eugene Mirman & Michael Showalter (Best Variety Show Host, 2007)
- Kristen Schaal (Best Female Stand Up Comedian, 2007)
- John Mulaney (Best Male Stand Up Comedian, 2007)
- Kurt Braunohler (Best Director, 2007)
- Joe Mande (Emerging Comic Award, 2007)
- Eddie Brill (Lifetime Achievement Award, 2007)
- Greg Johnson and Larry Murphy Show (Best Variety Show, 2007)
- Reggie Watts (Best Musical Comedy Act, 2008)
- Leo Allen (Best Variety Show Host, 2008)
- Michelle Collins (Best Female Stand Up Comedian, 2008)
- Kumail Nanjiani (Best Male Stand Up Comedian, 2008)
- Derrick Comedy (Best Sketch Comedy Group, 2008)
- Lennon Parham (Emerging Comic Award, 2008)
- Late Night with Conan O'Brien writing staff (Lifetime Achievement Award, 2008)
- Hannibal Buress (Best Male Stand Up Comedian, 2009)
- Morgan Murphy (Best Female Stand Up Comedian, 2009)
- Myq Kaplan (Emerging Comic Award, 2009)
- Kurt Braunohler (Best Male Stand Up Comedian, 2009)
- Andrea Rosen (Best Female Stand Up Comedian, 2009)
- Jenny Slate & Dean Fleischer-Camp (Best Comedic Video Short, 2010)
- Kurt Braunohler & Kristen Schaal (Best Variety Show Host, 2010)
- Chris Gethard (Outstanding Achievement in the Field of Tweeting, 2010)
- Serious Lunch (Best Sketch Comedy Group, 2011)
