= Jake Fogelnest =

American writer and television personality (born 1979)

- Born: Benjamin Jacob Fogelnest; March 14, 1979 (age 47); Philadelphia, Pennsylvania, U.S.
- Occupations: Writer; comedian
- Years active: 1994–present

Benjamin Jacob Fogelnest (born March 14, 1979), known professionally as Jake Fogelnest, is an American television writer, comedian, former radio personality, and satirist.

== Career ==
=== Squirt TV ===
In January 1994, when he was 14 years old, he started a pop culture television show, Squirt TV, from his New York City bedroom, which aired on Manhattan public-access cable TV. In 1996, the show moved from public-access television to MTV under the name Squirt TV on MTV.

=== Television ===
In 2005, he created Ten Years Later for MTV, a fictional documentary which followed Fogelnest's life if he "never grew out of 'Squirt TV.'" The show was co-written and directed by Tom Gianas.

Fogelnest was a staff writer for Netflix's Wet Hot American Summer: First Day of Camp. He was also a co-producer on Girlboss for Netflix and wrote the episode Long Ass Pants.

He was a story editor for the first season of the Hulu series Difficult People, and became a consulting producer for the second and third seasons. He wrote for two seasons on truTV's Billy on the Street. He served as an executive producer on the second season of Liza on Demand, and season one of the Comedy Central series Corporate, also writing the episode Society Tomorrow…He also wrote for the Will Ferrell and Molly Shannon specials The 2018 Rose Parade Hosted by Cord & Tish for Amazon and The Royal Wedding Live with Cord and Tish! for HBO and was the creator of the unproduced series Start Making Sense for IFC. Ben Stiller served as executive producer and was slated to direct the pilot.

=== Other television ===
He was a regular commentator on VH1's I Love the... series. Other television credits include a 1995-hour-long special for Comedy Central, MTV's 12 Angry Viewers, Upright Citizens Brigade, and guest appearances on The Jon Stewart Show, Howard Stern and The Chris Gethard Show.

In 2018, he appeared as DJ Dan Lyon in season two of the Netflix series GLOW.

=== Additional writing ===
He has written for magazines such as Spin, Ray Gun, Bikini, Alternative Press, and Jane and The Onion.

He contributed to the liner notes for The Numero Group's 2015 boxset, The Best of the Best Show with a definitive interview he conducted with Tom Scharpling and Jon Wurster.

In 2015, he wrote a piece for VICE sharing his feelings about the retirement of David Letterman from late-night television.

=== Theatre ===
In 1999, became actively involved at the Upright Citizens Brigade Theatre in New York City when it opened in 1999.

In 2000, he co-directed Jerry Minor is a Black Man for the Saturday Night Live alum. The show originated at UCB and was also performed at The Second City in Chicago.

In 2001, he served as assistant director for Sarah Silverman's one-woman show Jesus Is Magic at Joe's Pub.

In 2002, he co-directed (with Amy Poehler) the two-person show "Eye Candy," starring Dannah Phirman and Danielle Schneider, which was selected for the 2002 HBO US Comedy Arts Festival.

In 2004 he participated in the creation of "George Bush is a Motherfucker," which featured many members of Respecto Montalban and was produced by Adam McKay.

In 2005 he and Paul Scheer regularly hosted the show Talk Show with Jake Fogelnest at the original New York UCB Theatre.

In 2015, Scheer and Fogelnest brought the show Talk Show with Jake Fogelnest back for one-night only to celebrate the UCB Theatre's 10th Anniversary in Los Angeles.

In 2015, Fogelnest worked as a director with "Three Busy Debras" at the Annoyance Theatre in Brooklyn, New York.

=== Radio ===
Upon K-Rock's format switch, he hosted a radio show on the new Free-FM with Jackie Clarke called Jake and Jackie. The show was a combination of pop culture discussion and radio sketch comedy. He left the show for SiriusXM radio in 2006.

From 2006 to 2014, he had a show on SiriusXM's College rock/Indie rock channel, Sirius XMU. He was also heard on Sirius XM Alt Nation.

=== Podcasting and web productions ===
In 2012, he appeared as a DJ in the music video for Real Estate's video, "Easy".

In September 2012, he launched, The Fogelnest Files on Earwolf. Due to his increasing workload in television, he put the show on hiatus in 2014.

In 2014, he served as a staff writer and director at Funny Or Die.

He has appeared as a guest on numerous podcasts over the years, including WTF with Marc Maron.

In 2017, he appeared on the "What's in My Bag" series from Amoeba Records.

In 2019, he began writing for "The Ron Burgundy Podcast."

In August 2020, he launched his official Patreon channel.
