= Greg Johnson (comedian) =

Comedy career
- Medium: Standup
- Website: gregjohnson.tv

Greg Johnson is an American stand-up comedian, actor and TV host.

== Early life ==
Johnson grew up in Wellesley, Massachusetts and attended The Roxbury Latin School in West Roxbury, Massachusetts. Johnson has two siblings, Neil and Brian.

== Career ==
Johnson began his comedy career in Boston at age 17. Upon moving to New York City, he hosted a weekly show at Manhattan night club Rififi, performing alongside comedians such as David Cross, Aziz Ansari, Hannibal Buress, Kristen Schaal, Chelsea Peretti and Jenny Slate. The "Greg Johnson and Larry Murphy Show" at Rififi was named Best Variety Show by the ECNY Awards.

Johnson has made appearances on the television programs Last Week Tonight with John Oliver on HBO and IFC's The Whitest Kids U' Know. He has also appeared in the feature films Adventures in Comedy and Adult Beginners starring Nick Kroll and Rose Byrne. He has performed live with The Whitest Kids U' Know, comedian Trevor Moore, as part of the Eugene Mirman Comedy Festival, and in venues nationwide including Gramercy Theater in New York City, Wilbur Theater in Boston, Massachusetts, and Shubert Theatre in New Haven, Connecticut. Johnson formerly hosted the talk radio show Get in Bed weeknights on Sirius Satellite Radio. He hosts the daily live television news show BK Live on BRIC TV, the cable TV and digital network of BRIC Arts Media. In 2015, Johnson began producing and starring in the television series Stand Up Brooklyn with Greg Johnson on BRIC TV, based on his weekly live comedy series.

Brooklyn Magazine called Johnson one of The 50 Funniest People in Brooklyn. New York magazine said, "It's a wonder Greg Johnson gets any sleep," about his comedy hosting, blogging and Twitter activity. Brooklyn Vegan called Johnson "a classic stand-up comedian who is all about economical and brilliant set-up and delivery."

== Personal life ==
Johnson lives in Park Slope, Brooklyn.
