= Kristen Schaal =

American actress, comedian, and writer (born 1978)

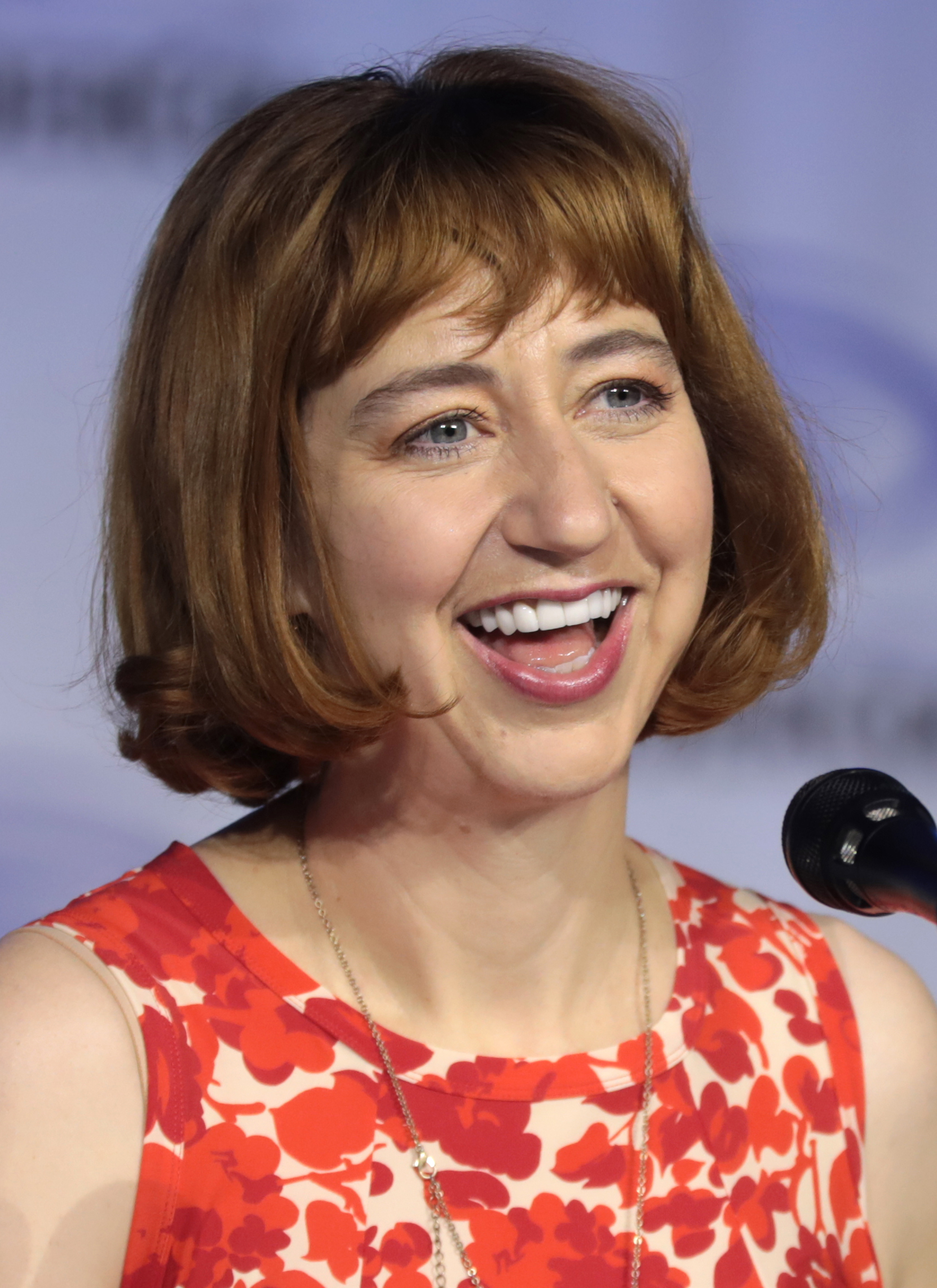
- Schaal at the 2022 WonderCon
- Born: Kristen Joy Schaal; January 24, 1978 (age 48); Longmont, Colorado, U.S.
- Education: University of Colorado, Boulder; Northwestern University (BA)
- Occupations: Actress; comedian; writer
- Years active: 1999–present
- Spouse: Rich Blomquist (m. 2012)
- Children: 1

Comedy career
- Medium: Stand-up; film; television
- Genres: Observational comedy; satire; political satire

Kristen Joy Schaal (/ʃɑːl/ SHAHL; born January 24, 1978) is an American actress, comedian, and writer. Known for her distinctive high-pitched, childlike voice, she voices Louise Belcher in Bob's Burgers and voiced Mabel Pines in Gravity Falls. She also played Mel in Flight of the Conchords, The Guide in What We Do in the Shadows, Hurshe Heartshe in The Heart, She Holler, and Carol Pilbasian in The Last Man on Earth. She provided several voices for BoJack Horseman; for the character of Sarah Lynn, she was nominated for a Primetime Emmy Award for Outstanding Character Voice-Over Performance. Other roles include Amanda Simmons in The Hotwives of Orlando, Hazel Wassername in 30 Rock, Victoria Best in WordGirl, Trixie in the Toy Story franchise (2010–present), Bobbi in My Spy, Shannon in Despicable Me 2, Number Two in The Mysterious Benedict Society, Barb in Cloudy with a Chance of Meatballs 2 and Anne in Wilfred. She was an occasional commentator in The Daily Show from 2008 to 2016. She voiced Sayrna in the 2019 EA video game Anthem. She also voiced Taffy from The Simpsons.

== Early life ==
Schaal was born on January 24, 1978, in Longmont, Colorado, to a Lutheran family of Dutch ancestry. She was raised on her family's cattle ranch, in a rural area near Boulder, Colorado. Her father is a construction worker and her mother a secretary.

Schaal attended Skyline High School where she graduated in 1996. She has a brother, David, born in 1975. She attended the University of Colorado in Boulder for a year and graduated from Northwestern University. She then moved to New York in 2000 to pursue a comedy career. In 2005, she had her first break when she performed at the People’s Improv Theatre in New York doing character work and was included in the New York article "The Ten Funniest New Yorkers You've Never Heard Of".

== Career ==
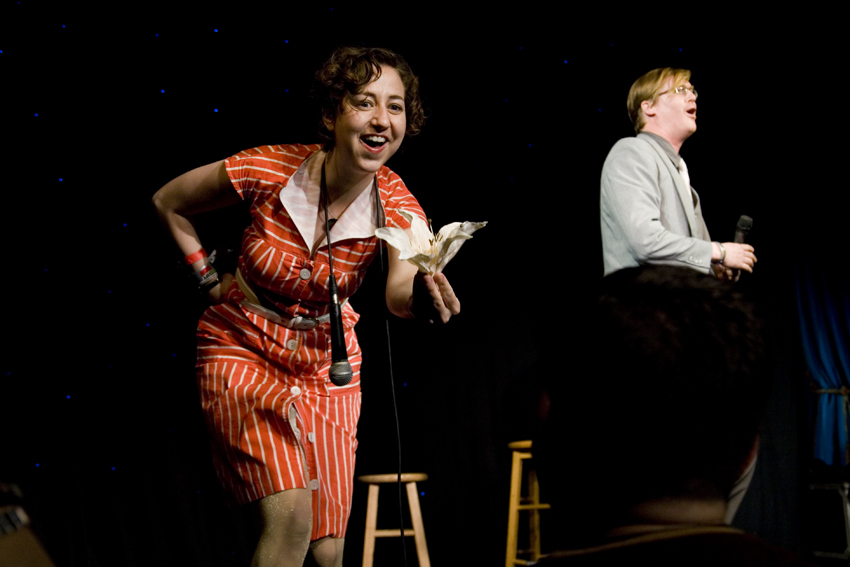
Schaal and comedy partner Kurt Braunohler onstage in 2010

=== Live comedy ===
In 2006, Schaal performed at the 2006 HBO US Comedy Arts Festival in Aspen, where she won the award for "Best Alternative Comedian". She was also the winner of the second annual Andy Kaufman Award (hosted by the New York Comedy Festival), Best Female Stand-up at the 2006 Nightlife Awards in New York City, and "Best Female Stand Up Comedian" at the 2007 ECNY Awards. At the 2008 Melbourne International Comedy Festival, she won the Barry Award for her show Kristen Schaal As You Have Probably Never Seen Her Before, tying with Nina Conti. Also in 2006, Schaal appeared on the first season of the Comedy Central show Live at Gotham. She co-hosts the weekly variety show Hot Tub in Los Angeles, which was voted "Best Variety Show of 2005" by a Time-Out New York's readers poll. She also performs at the Peoples Improv Theater on the improv team, "Big Black Car". She is a founding member of the theatre company The Striking Viking Story Pirates, which adapts stories by children into sketches and songs.

Schaal performed live at the Edinburgh Fringe 2007, where she was one of six acts (chosen from over two hundred American productions at the Fringe) requested to perform at the US Consul General-sponsored "Fringe USA" Showcase.

On her return to the Edinburgh Fringe Festival in August 2008, Schaal was nominated for the If.comedy award for Kristen Schaal And Kurt Braunohler: Double Down Hearts.

Schaal has also performed at the Royal Albert Hall, London, as part of The Secret Policeman's Ball 2008 in aid of Amnesty International, and at the Bonnaroo 2009 music festival. In 2010, Schaal appeared as a stand-up comic on John Oliver's New York Stand Up Show and at the Solid Sound Festival at the Massachusetts Museum of Contemporary Art.

=== Film, TV, and radio ===
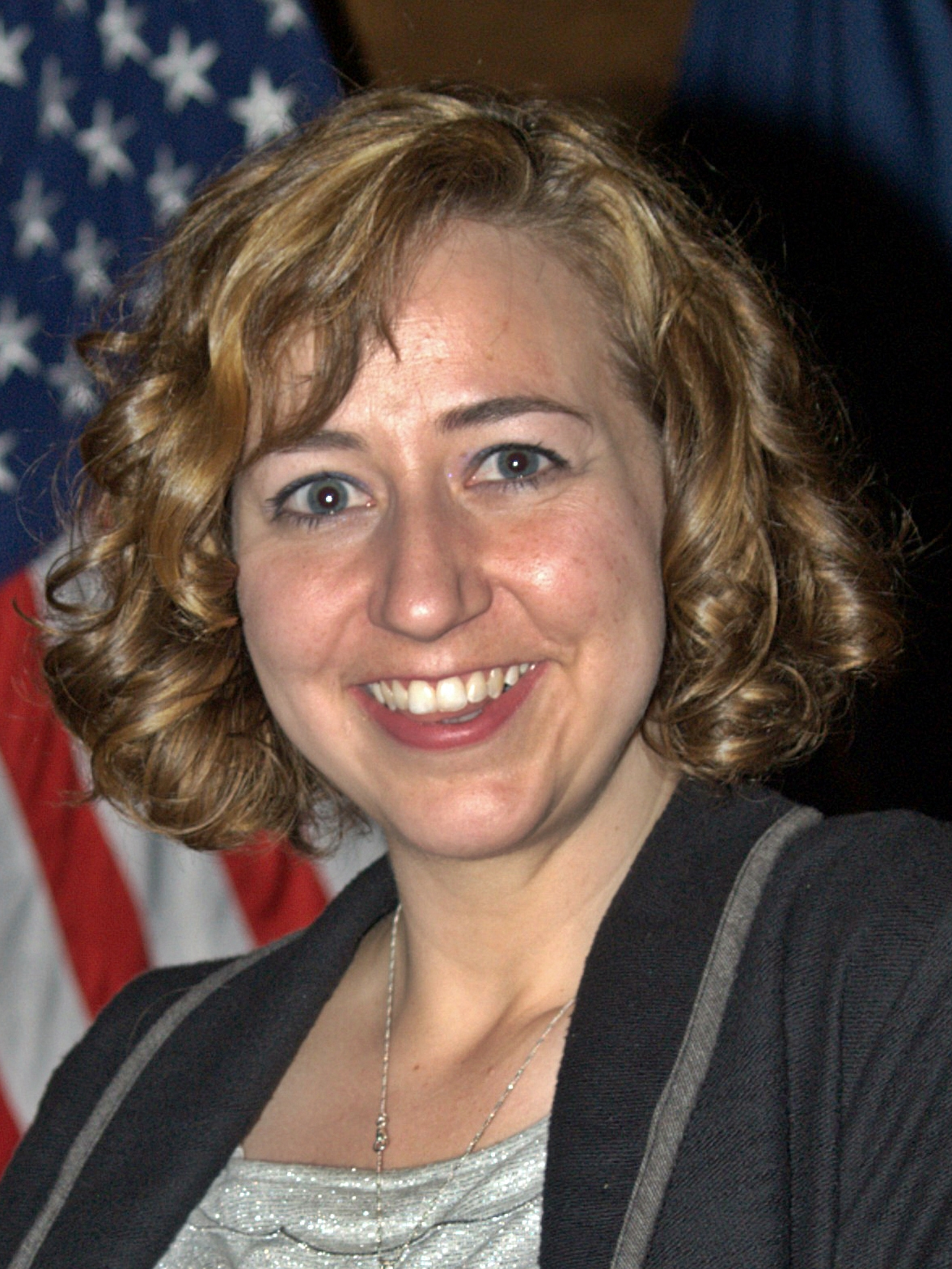
Schaal at the 2010 Brooklyn Book Festival

In 2001, Schaal had a bit role in the film Kate & Leopold. Schaal appeared on HBO's Flight of the Conchords as the stalker-fan Mel, a role which earned her an EWwy nomination for Best Supporting Actress in a Comedy Series in 2009. She was also a credited consultant and writer for Season 11 of South Park, and appeared on the BBC's Never Mind the Buzzcocks.

She made her first appearance as a "special commentator" on Comedy Central's The Daily Show on March 13, 2008, often presented in recurring appearances as its news team's "Senior Women's Issues Correspondent". In 2008, she made an appearance on Good News Week during the Melbourne International Comedy Festival. In October 2008 she appeared in Amnesty International's The Secret Policeman's Ball 2008. She also appeared on an episode of Last Week Tonight with John Oliver about sexual education, talking about abstinence and non-abstinence only education.

Other film and television credits include Aqua Teen Hunger Force, Snake 'n' Bacon, Norbit, Get Him to the Greek, Conviction, Cheap Seats, Freak Show, Cirque du Freak: The Vampire's Assistant, Adam and Steve, The Goods: Live Hard, Sell Hard, Delirious, Good News Week (Australia), Law & Order: Special Victims Unit, Law & Order: Criminal Intent, The Education of Max Bickford, Comedy Central's Contest Searchlight, Ugly Betty, How I Met Your Mother, MTV's Human Giant, and Mad Men. She was a contributor to the sketch/music series The Nighttime Clap on the Fuse music network.

She appeared on Fuse's original comedy series The P.A. She appeared in two TV pilots written and directed by Jersey City comedian Dan McNamara – The Calderons and Redeeming Rainbow, both of which were screened as official selections at the 2006 and 2007 New York Television Festivals. She appeared in television commercials for T-Mobile, Wendy's, RadioShack, Starburst, Sony Xperia, and Zaxby's. She made an appearance, in April 2008, on the IFC sketch comedy show The Whitest Kids U' Know. On April 3, 2009, she taped an episode of Comedy Central Presents. From 2010 to 2015, she added her voice to the PBS Kids GO! series WordGirl as Victoria Best, a child prodigy whose parents taught her to be the best at everything that she does. Schaal voiced 12-year-old Mabel Pines on Disney Channel's hit TV series Gravity Falls from 2012 to 2016. Since 2011, she has voiced the character Louise on the FOX Network series Bob's Burgers.

She starred in A. D. Miles' MyDamnChannel.com series Horrible People. In October 2008, Schaal appeared in an episode of Spicks and Specks. On June 10, 2009, Schaal broadcast her first radio show, High Five!!, on Sirius XM Radio's 'RawDog' channel with co-host Kurt Braunohler. Schaal stars in her own web series, Penelope Princess of Pets, one episode of which doubled as the video for the New Pornographers' "Mutiny, I Promise You". She voiced Trixie the Triceratops in Toy Story 3 and Pumpkin Witch and Palace Witch in Shrek Forever After. She was also in the music video for Joey Ramone's "New York City." She also guest-starred in the Modern Family episode "Fifteen Percent", as well as the music video for "Conversation 16" by The National. Schaal guest starred on the MC Frontalot album Solved. She was featured with Kurt Braunohler on the Radiolab episode "Loops". Schaal was in a commercial for the Xperia Play version of Minecraft.

Schaal guest starred on The Simpsons May 8, 2011, episode "Homer Scissorhands," in which she plays Taffy, a love interest of Milhouse Van Houten. She is incorrectly listed in the credits as "Kristen Schall". This prompted Simpsons writers to issue her a unique apology on the next week's episode in which Bart's chalkboard joke in the intro to the show states "It's Kristen Schaal, not Kristen Schall." Schaal voiced Shannon, a girl who goes on a date with Gru, in Despicable Me 2; she then appeared in a music video for "Weird Al" Yankovic's 2014 song "Tacky", a parody of Pharrell Williams' "Happy". In 2013, Schaal guest starred in the two-part episode "Sea Tunt" of Archer, lending her voice to a character named Tiffy. In 2014, Schaal co-starred alongside Casey Wilson, Danielle Schneider, Tymberlee Hill, Andrea Savage, and Angela Kinsey in the first season of the Hulu original series The Hotwives of Orlando. She co-starred alongside Will Forte in the FOX comedy The Last Man on Earth, which premiered on March 1, 2015.

Schaal also voices various characters, including the character Sarah Lynn, in the Netflix original animated series BoJack Horseman. In 2017, she was nominated for a Primetime Emmy Award for Outstanding Character Voice-Over Performance for her performance as Sarah Lynn. Schaal appeared in A Walk in the Woods (2015) as hiker Mary Ellen. In 2016, Schaal was a panelist on episode 1 of the British comedy show The Big Fat Quiz of Everything, a spinoff of The Big Fat Quiz of the Year. Schaal voices Molly in the Snap Originals series Death Hacks, co-starring with Thomas Middleditch. In 2020, she played the daughter of George Carlin's character in the sequel Bill & Ted Face the Music and guested on the first episode of Netflix's Aunty Donna's Big Ol' House of Fun. Schaal was featured in the episode "The Plantars Check In" in the animated series Amphibia in which she voiced Bella the Bellhop. Schaal appeared as a guest star in Scooby-Doo and Guess Who? on the episode "The Horrible Haunted Hospital of Dr. Phineas Phrag!". Schaal was featured on the episode "Dead Mall" in the animated series Bless the Harts where she voiced Stacey. Schaal starred as Number Two in the Disney+ series The Mysterious Benedict Society and appears as the Guide on the FX series What We Do in the Shadows.

=== Books ===
Schaal wrote a book of humor, The Sexy Book of Sexy Sex, with her husband, former Daily Show writer Rich Blomquist. It was published in July 2010 by Chronicle Books. She originally intended for them to write the book under pseudonyms, "because I don't want anyone to imagine me doing those things", but realized it would be harder to promote the book without using their real names.

== Personal life ==
Schaal has been married to comedy writer Rich Blomquist since 2012. In 2018, she gave birth to a daughter. As of 2020, they live in Los Feliz.

In 2017, during a charity stream hosted by Ethan Klein, Schaal revealed that she had suffered an ectopic pregnancy and a ruptured fallopian tube during an unspecified recording session for Gravity Falls, losing at least two liters of blood, and she underwent emergency surgery after being rushed to the hospital.

== Filmography ==
=== Film ===
Film
Year	Title	Role	Notes
2001	Kate & Leopold	Miss Tree	
2004	Poster Boy	Bookstore Lady #14	
2005	Adam & Steve	Ruth	
2006	Delirious	Joelle	
2007	Norbit	Event Organizer	
2009	The Goods: Live Hard, Sell Hard	Stewardess Stacey	
2009	Cirque du Freak: The Vampire's Assistant	Gertha Teeth	
2010	When in Rome	Ilona	
2010	Valentine's Day	Ms. Gilroy	
2010	Shrek Forever After	Pumpkin and Palace Witches	Voice cameos
2010	Get Him to the Greek	Production Assistant	
2010	Dinner for Schmucks	Susana	
2010	Going the Distance	Female Bartender	
2010	Toy Story 3	Trixie	Voice
2011	Hawaiian Vacation	Trixie	Voice; short film
2011	Butter	Carol-Ann Stevenson	
2011	The Muppets	Moderator	Cameo
2012	Sleepwalk with Me	Cynthia	
2013	Despicable Me 2	Shannon	Voice
2013	Cloudy with a Chance of Meatballs 2	Barb	Voice
2013	Welcome to the Jungle	Brenda	
2015	A Walk in the Woods	Mary Ellen	
2016	Donald Trump's The Art of the Deal: The Movie	Gloria, Deborah	Voice
2016	The Boss	Sandy Haim	
2017	All Nighter	Roberta	
2017	Literally, Right Before Aaron	Talula Orley	
2017	Captain Underpants: The First Epic Movie	Edith	Voice
2017	Austin Found	Nancy	
2018	Boundaries	JoJo Jaconi	
2019	Toy Story 4	Trixie	Voice
2020	My Spy	Bobbi	
2020	Bill & Ted Face the Music	Kelly	
2021	Seal Team	Beth	Voice
2022	My Butt Has a Fever	Louise Belcher	Voice; short film
2022	The Bob's Burgers Movie	Louise Belcher	Voice
2024	My Spy: The Eternal City	Bobbi	
2024	Thelma the Unicorn	Goat Girl	Voice
2026	Toy Story 5	Trixie	Voice

=== Television ===
Television
Year	Title	Role	Notes
2001–2002	The Education of Max Bickford	Valerie Holmes	3 episodes
2004	Law & Order: Special Victims Unit	Abby	Episode: "Brotherhood"
2005	Cheap Seats: Without Ron Parker	Emily	Episode: "Dog Show/World Beard and Mustache Championship"
2006	Six Degrees	Gail	2 episodes
2006	Conviction	Allie Rubinoff	Episode: "Madness"
2006	Ugly Betty	Nancy	Episode: "Pilot"
2006	Freak Show	Various voices	7 episodes
2007	Scott Bateman Presents	Various voices	2 episodes
2007	Law & Order: Criminal Intent	Alana Binder	Episode: "30"
2007	Human Giant	Girl in Doritos Commercial	Episode: "Lil 9-11"
2007	Mad Men	Nannette	Episode: "Smoke Gets in Your Eyes"
2007	How I Met Your Mother	Laura Girard	Episode: "The Platinum Rule"
2007–2009	Flight of the Conchords	Mel	21 episodes
2008	Aqua Teen Hunger Force	Tammy Tangerine (voice)	Episode: "Bible Fruit"
2008	The Whitest Kids U' Know	Homeless Woman	Episode: "2.9"
2008	Snake 'n' Bacon	The Green Fairy	Episode: "Pilot"
2008–2016	The Daily Show	Herself (commentator)	31 episodes
2009	Xavier: Renegade Angel	Various voices	Episode: "Going Normal"
2009	Comedy Showcase	Tourist	Episode: "The Increasingly Poor Decisions of Todd Margaret"
2010	Modern Family	Whitney	Episode: "Fifteen Percent"
2010	Comedy Lab	Penelope	Episode: "Penelope Princess of Pets"
2010	Fact Checkers Unit	Paula	Episode: "One Groundhog Day Dog"
2010	Scared Shrekless	Sugar the Gingerbread Girl (voice)	Short
2010–2015	WordGirl	Victoria Best (voice)	8 episodes
2011	The Penguins of Madagascar	Muffy, Buffy, and Fluffy (voice)	Episode: "Operation: Neighbor Swap"
2011	Soul Quest Overdrive	Tammy (voice)	5 episodes
2011–2012	American Dad!	Librarian, Girl (voice)	2 episodes
2011–2014	The Heart, She Holler	Hurshe Heartshe	6 episodes
2011–2018	The Simpsons	Taffy / Louise Belcher (voice)	2 episodes
2011–present	Bob's Burgers	Louise Belcher (voice)	Main cast Annie Award for Outstanding Achievement, Voice Acting in an Animated TV/Broadcast Production
2012–2013	30 Rock	Hazel Wassername	11 episodes
2012–2014	Adventure Time	Jake Jr. (voice)	4 episodes
2012–2016	Gravity Falls	Mabel Pines (voice)	Main cast; 39 episodes
2013–2016	Comedy Bang! Bang!	Herself / Gina Guppies	2 episodes
2013	Archer	Tiffy (voice)	2 episodes
2013	Wilfred	Anne	4 episodes
2013	NTSF:SD:SUV::	Deborah	Episode: "Trading Faces"
2013	Toy Story of Terror	Trixie (voice)	Short
2014	Toy Story That Time Forgot	Trixie (voice)	Short
2014	The Hotwives of Orlando	Amanda Simmons	Series regular; 7 episodes
2014	Glee	Mary Halloran	Episode: "The Untitled Rachel Berry Project"
2014–2020	BoJack Horseman	Sarah Lynn, various voices	14 episodes Nominated – Primetime Emmy Award for Outstanding Character Voice-Over Performance
2015	Axe Cop	God (voice)	Episode: "Axe Cop Saves God"
2015	The Hotwives of Las Vegas	Amanda Simmons	Episode: "Old Friends, New Enemies"
2015–2018	The Last Man on Earth	Carol Pilbasian	Main role; 65 episodes Also director: "Gender Friender"
2016	Wander Over Yonder	Mavis (voice)	Episode: "The Cartoon"
2016	Brad Neely's Harg Nallin' Sclopio Peepio	Various voices	Episode: "For Sarandon"
2016	Great Minds with Dan Harmon	Amelia Earhart	Episode: "Amelia Earhart"
2016	Transformers: Rescue Bots	Chickadee (voice)	Episode: "Camp Cody"
2018	Ask the StoryBots	Biologist	Episode: "How Many Types of Animals Are There?"
2019	Future Man	Screw	Episode: "Guess Who's Coming to Lunch"
2019	Corporate	Sheena	Episode: "The Tragedy"
2019	Squinters	Tina	6 episodes
2019	Forky Asks a Question	Trixie (voice)	2 episodes
2019–2024	What We Do in the Shadows	The Guide	Main season 5 Recurring seasons 3–4; Guest season 1
2020	Bubble Guppies	Agnes (voice)	Episode: "Dragons N' Roses!"
2020	Amphibia	Bella the Bellhop (voice)	Episode: "The Plantars Check In"
2020	Death Hacks	Molly (voice)	10 episodes
2020	Scooby-Doo and Guess Who?	Herself (voice)	Episode: "The Horrible Haunted Hospital of Dr. Phineas Phrag!"
2020	Bless the Harts	Stacey (voice)	Episode: "Dead Mall"
2020	Aunty Donna's Big Ol' House of Fun	Dishwasher (voice)	Episode: "Housemates"
2020–2022	Dicktown	Kendra (voice)	2 episodes
2021	Teenage Euthanasia	Norma the Crotch Beetle (voice)	Episode: "Adventures in Beetlesitting"
2021−2022	Big Mouth	Bernadette "Bernie" Sanders (voice)	Recurring role
2021−2022	The Mysterious Benedict Society	Number Two	Main role
2022	Our Flag Means Death	Antoinette	2 episodes
2023	The Muppets Mayhem	Jenna Henderson	Episode: "Track 10: We Will Rock You"
2025	Chibiverse	Mabel Pines (voice)	Episode: "Mabel's Dream Date"
2025	And Just Like That...	Lois Fingerhood	Episode: "The Rat Race"
2025	Percy Jackson and the Olympians	Tempest	Episode: "I Play Dodgeball with Cannibals"
2026	St. Denis Medical	Ashley Lawrence	2 episodes
2026	President Curtis	Amelia Earhart (voice)	2 episodes

=== Games ===
Video games
Year	Title	Voice role	Ref.
2010	Toy Story 3: The Video Game	Trixie	
2019	Anthem	Sayrna	

=== Audio ===
Year	Title	Role	Author	Production company	Ref.
2021	The Sandman: Act II	Delirium	Neil Gaiman, Dirk Maggs	Audible	

=== Music videos ===
Year	Song	Artist	Ref.
2011	"Conversation 16"	The National	
2014	"Tacky" (a parody of Pharrell Williams's "Happy")	"Weird Al" Yankovic	

== Awards and nominations ==
Year	Award	Category	Nominee	Result	Ref.
2005	New York Comedy Festival	Andy Kaufman Award	Herself	Won	
2006	HBO US Comedy Arts Festival	Best Alternative Comedian	Herself	Won	
2006	Nightlife Awards	Outstanding Female Standup Comedian	Herself	Won	
2007	ECNY Awards	Best Female Standup Comedian	Herself	Won	
2008	Edinburgh Festival Fringe	If.comedy award	Kristen Schaal And Kurt Braunohler: Double Down Hearts	Nominated	
2008	Melbourne International Comedy Festival	Barry Award	Kristen Schaal As You Have Probably Never Seen Her Before	Won	
2009	1st Streamy Awards	Best Female Actor in a Comedy Web Series	Horrible People	Nominated	
2012	2nd Annual Behind the Voice Actor Awards	Best Female Lead Vocal Performance in a Television Series – Comedy/Musical	as "Mabel Pines" from Gravity Falls	Won	
2013	3rd Annual Behind the Voice Actor Awards	Best Female Lead Vocal Performance in a Television Series – Comedy/Musical	as "Mabel Pines" from Gravity Falls	Nominated	
2013	40th Annie Awards	Outstanding Achievement, Voice Acting in an Animated Television/Broadcast Production	as "Mabel Pines" in "Tourist Trapped," Gravity Falls	Won	
2014	American Comedy Awards	Comedy Special of the Year	Kristen Schaal: Live at the Fillmore	Nominated	
2016	43rd Annie Awards	Outstanding Achievement, Voice Acting in an Animated TV/Broadcast Production	as "Louise Belcher" in "Hawk & Chick," Bob's Burgers	Won	
2017	69th Primetime Creative Arts Emmy Awards	Outstanding Character Voice-Over Performance	as Sarah Lynn in "That's Too Much, Man!," BoJack Horseman	Nominated	
