= Tak and the Power of Juju (TV series) =

American animated television series

- Genre: Comedy; Action; Adventure; Slapstick; Fantasy
- Created by: John Blackburn (games)
- Based on: The game published by THQ
- Developed by: Jed Spingarn; Nick Jennings
- Voices of: Hal Sparks; Lloyd Sherr; Patrick Warburton; Kari Wahlgren; John DiMaggio; Dannah Phirman; Rob Paulsen; S. Scott Bullock; Maurice LaMarche
- Theme music composer: Guy Moon
- Composers: Guy Moon; Shawn Patterson
- Country of origin: United States
- Original language: English
- No. of seasons: 1
- No. of episodes: 26 (50 segments)

Production
- Executive producer: Nick Jennings
- Running time: 22 minutes
- Production companies: THQ; Nickelodeon Animation Studios

Original release
- Network: Nickelodeon
- Release: August 31, 2007 – January 24, 2009

Tak and the Power of Juju is an American animated television series that aired from August 31, 2007, to January 24, 2009. Loosely based on the 2003 video game of the same name, the series consists of two eleven-minute stories per half-hour episode. It was produced by Nickelodeon Animation Studios in association with THQ. The series was produced by Nick Jennings and directed, among others, by Mark Risley, Jim Schumann, and Heiko Drengenberg. It was the second Nickelodeon series to be made with CGI, after The Adventures of Jimmy Neutron, Boy Genius and is also the first one to be fully overseen by Nickelodeon Animation Studio. The show continued to air reruns on Nicktoons until September 3, 2012. 26 episodes were produced.

== Characters ==
=== Main ===
- Tak (voiced by Hal Sparks) is a 14-year-old errand boy and a lowly apprentice who lives with his mentor Jibolba. He wields various forms of magic derived from the Jujus, magical creatures from another dimension. Tak's mother is the Aurora Juju and Tak's father is a Pupununu.
- Jeera (voiced by Kari Wahlgren) is the Chief's daughter and Tak's best friend. She is a tomboy and will often punch Tak as a sign of endearment or annoyance. It is heavily implied that she has romantic feelings for Tak.
- Jibolba (voiced by Lloyd Sherr) is Tak's mentor, uncle and shaman of the Pupununu tribe. He is 177 years old.
- Lok (voiced by Patrick Warburton) is a cowardly Pupununu warrior. He often refers to himself in third person.
- Keeko (voiced by John DiMaggio) is a careless, daydreaming, laid-back orphan. He is a skilled inventor, but his inventions rarely work.
- Zaria (voiced by Dannah Phirman) is Jeera's 16-year-old sister and the heir to the Pupununu. She is spoiled, bossy, and brags that she is the most beautiful in all the tribe.
- The Chief (voiced by Maurice LaMarche) is the leader of the Pupununu and father of Jeera and Zaria. A bumbling but harmless figurehead, he constantly gets furious at Tak due to his mistakes in the use of his Juju power.

=== Pupununu Tribe ===
- Slog (voiced by Megan Cavanagh) is a heavy-set woman who is incredibly strong. She is Lok's biggest fan and harbors a crush on him.
- Blod and Bleeta Oongachaka (voiced by Rene Mujica and Kari Wahlgren) are the children of the tribe's wealthiest family, the Oongachakas. Blod is a hot-headed oddball and likes to brag about his wealth and has taken a romantic liking to Zaria, but she hates him. Bleeta is optimistic and curious about the world outside of her lifestyle.
- Chaka and Oonga Oongachaka (voiced by Mindy Sterling and Lloyd Sherr) are the parents of Blod and Bleeta and friends of the Chief.
- Mask Guy (voiced by Lloyd Sherr) is a villager who wears a oversized voodoo mask to hide his unhumanly beautiful face.
- Log Hermit (voiced by Maurice LaMarche) is a villager who wears a log. He is also revealed to have a good singing voice.
- Linda (voiced by Kari Wahlgren) is a bipedal sheep and friend of Tak.
- Donna (voiced by April Winchell) is a talking sheep in Linda's herd.
- Navis is Jeera's pet Gratch.
- Traloc (voiced by Jeff Bennett) is an evil shaman who attempts to replace Jibolba as the Pupununu shaman. However, he is defeated and transformed into a donkey.

=== Jujus ===
Jujus are magical creatures who originate from the Juju Realm.

- Aurora Juju (voiced by Danielle Schneider) is Tak's mother, who created the crystal that powers his staff.
- Belly Juju (voiced by Maurice LaMarche) is a hungry Juju with no brain whose body is controlled by his stomach.
- Big Boss Juju is a powerful, fiery rock monster.
- Brain Juju (voiced by Nick Jennings) is a brain-themed Juju.
- Bug Juju (voiced by Wayne Knight) is a small beetle-like Juju who can manipulate other insects.
- Caged Juju is a cranky, horned Juju who lives in a cage and is obsessed with eating others.
- Darkness Juju (voiced by Mitch Watson) is a demonic Juju and Aurora Juju's former fiancé.
- Dinky Juju (voiced by Maurice LaMarche) is a short-tempered Juju with powerful magic. He is an adult, but many confuse him for a baby because of his small size.
- The Devour Juju Brothers (both voiced by S. Scott Bullock) are troublemaking Jujus and the brothers of Caged Juju.
- Feet Juju are a disembodied pair of blue legs who enjoy dancing.
- The Gremlin Jujus (voiced by Jeff Bennett) are short anglerfish-faced creatures who serve as law enforcement.
- Head Juju is a green floating head with arms and the coach of a Gratchball team.
- Judge Juju (voiced by Rob Paulsen) is a corn Juju dressed as a judge. She is female, but has a masculine voice.
  - The Bulldrafish is a chimeric monster and Judge Juju's pet. It has a bull head named Henry/George (voiced by Maurice LaMarche), a dragon head named Doris (voiced by Dannah Phirman), a fish head named Gillbert (voiced by Rob Paulsen), and a fish tail.
- Killjoy Juju (voiced by Mary Birdsong) is a one-eyed Juju known for stopping parties and Party Juju's wife.
- Love Juju (voiced by Danielle Schneider) is a mermaid-like Juju who wields a snorkel as if it was her wand.
- Mayhem Juju is a small, teleporting Juju who Tak and Jeera adopt in the episode "New Pet".
- The Motikis are wild tiki-like creatures who will go on a rampage if they are out of the Juju Realm. They are later revealed to be living cookie jars who can only be stopped by screwing their heads off.
- Party Juju (voiced by Rob Paulsen) is a skeletal Juju who is known to start parties. Only his wife, Killjoy Juju, can undo the effects of his powers.
- Phobia Juju is a floating brain Juju who helps the Pupununu tribe overcome their fears.
- Psychic Juju (voiced by S. Scott Bullock) is a large-headed genie-like Juju with psychic powers.
- Pugnacious Juju (voiced by Kirk Ward) is a three-armed retired boxer Juju.
- Repulsive Juju (voiced by John DiMaggio) is a slug-like Juju and the younger brother of Repugnant Juju and Really, Really, Revolting Juju.
- Repugnant Juju (voiced by Dannah Phirman) is a gross-looking Juju and the sister of Repulsive Juju and Really, Really Revolting Juju.
- Really, Really, Revolting Juju (voiced by Hal Sparks) is a gross-looking Juju and the sister of Repugnant Juju and Repulsive Juju.
- Roadkill Juju (voiced by John DiMaggio) is a short peg-legged Juju who loves being run over by J-Runners.
- Spider Juju (voiced by Maurice LaMarche) is a French-accented spider-like man-eating Juju.
- Vendor Juju (voiced by Nick Jennings) is an orange octopus-like Juju who can sell anything from within its body.

== Episodes ==
=== Series overview ===
| Season | Episodes | Originally released | |
| Season | Episodes | First released | Last released |
|---|---|---|---|
| 1 | 26 | August 31, 2007 | January 24, 2009 |

| No. | Title | Directed by | Written by | Storyboard by | Original release date | Prod. code |
|---|---|---|---|---|---|---|
| 1 | "Woodiefest" "Loser" | Audu Paden Lane Lueras | Mitch Watson Peter Hastings | Jim Schumann and Al Zegler Al Zegler | August 31, 2007 | 101 |
| 2 | "A Shaman's Shaman" "The Gift" | Jim Schumann Nick Jennings | Gene Laufenberg Brandon Auman | Michael Mullen Heiko Drengenberg and Lane Lueras | September 8, 2007 | 102 |
| 3 | "The Three Chiefs" "The Party" | Heiko Drengenberg | Tom Krajewski | Heiko Drengenberg and Lane Lueras Dean Criswell | September 15, 2007 | 103 |
| 4 | "The Beast" "To Zaria with Love" | Lane Lueras and Mark Risley Heiko Drengenberg | Reid Harrison Nicole Dubuc | Al Zegler Tim Eldred | September 29, 2007 | 104 |
| 5 | "Zaria's in Charge" "Bad Luck's Back" | Jim Schumann and Mark Risley Jim Schumann | Nicole Dubuc Mitch Watson | Michael Kenny Linda Miller | October 13, 2007 | 105 |
| 6 | "This Bites" "Chief?" | Jim Schumann | Reid Harrison | Michael Mullen Linda Miller | October 27, 2007 | 107 |
| 7 | "Big Boss Brawl" "Our Favorite Juju" | Jim Schumann Heiko Drengenberg | Darren Jaspan and Mitch Watson Story by : John McCann; Teleplay by : Peter Hastings and Mitch Watson | Michael Mullen Alex Mann and Bert Ring | November 24, 2007 | 106 |
| 8 | "Love Hurts" "Frien-e-mies" | Heiko Drengenberg | Nicole Dubuc | Adam Henry and Michael Mullen Robert Griffith and Michael Mullen | December 8, 2007 | 108 |
| 9 | "The Littlest Gratch" "Lok the Offender" | Jim Schumann Lane Lueras | Reid Harrison Reid Harrison and Mark Henry | Linda Miller Heiko Drengenberg and Lane Lueras | January 12, 2008 | 109 |
| 10 | "Joy Ride" "Step Juju" | Heiko Drengenberg Lane Lueras | Reid Harrison Gene Laufenberg | Robert Griffith Doug McCarthy | January 26, 2008 | 110 |
| 11 | "Great Juju Impersonator" "Boom Bang Boom" | Lane Lueras Jim Schumann | Tom Krajewski Reid Harrison | Al Zegler Linda Miller | February 9, 2008 | 111 |
| 12 | "Pugnacious No More" "Little Chief" | Jim Schumann and Adam Henry Lane Lueras | Reid Harrison Nicole Dubuc | Linda Miller and Adam Henry Doug McCarthy | February 23, 2008 | 112 |
| 13 | "Tikis of War" "Hairy Zaria" | Lane Lueras Heiko Drengenberg | Adam Henry Nicole Dubuc | Al Zegler Alex Mann | March 22, 2008 | 114 |
| 14 | "Mofather" "Big Love" | Heiko Drengenberg | Gene Laufenberg Dave Lewman | Alex Mann Robert Griffith | April 5, 2008 | 115 |
| 15 | "Ball of Wax" "Testing Jibolba" | Michael Mullen Mark O'Hare | Tom Krajewski Nicole Dubuc | Michael Mullen Mark O'Hare | May 19, 2008 / May 20, 2008 | 116 |
| 16 | "Beautiful Girls" "Bad Medicine" | Jim Schumann and Mark O'Hare Heiko Drengenberg | Tom Krajewski Dave Lewman | Mark O'Hare Alex Mann | May 21, 2008 / May 22, 2008 | 117 |
| 17 | "Ball Boy" "The Lost Boys" | Lane Lueras | Gene Laufenberg | Al Zegler Doug McCarthy and Lane Lueras | May 23, 2008 / January 24, 2009 | 118 |
| 18 | "Girls Only" "Secession" | Lane Lueras Michael Mullen | Tom Krajewski Peter Hastings and Mitch Watson | Al Zegler Michael Mullen | October 19, 2008 (Note: Both episodes was first released in The Trouble with Magic DVD on June 24, 2008.) | 113 |
| 19 | "Nice Calves" "Double Tak" | Jim Schumann | Dave Lewman | Linda Miller Michael Mullen | October 19, 2008 | 121 |
| 20 | "Sheep Dip" "Slog the Babysitter" | Jim Schumann | Tom Krajewski Mitch Watson | Linda Miller Al Zegler | November 1, 2008 | 122 |
| 21 | "Feathers" "Sans Sheriff" | Jim Schumann Bert Ring | Jim Krieg Reid Harrison | Michael Mullen Michael Mullen and Lane Lueras | November 8, 2008 | 123 |
| 22–23 | "Destiny Schmestiny" | Jim Schumann | Reid Harrison and Mitch Watson | Robert Griffith, Linda Miller, Michael Mullen, and Al Zegler | November 15, 2008 | 119–120 |
| 24 | "Giant Chief" "Shrink a Dink" | Jim Schumann | Ned Goldreyer and Dave Lewman Reid Harrison | Al Zegler Heiko Drengenberg | November 15, 2008 | 124 |
| 25 | "Break This" "Pack of Apes" | Bert Ring | Ned Goldreyer, Tom Krajewski, and Mitch Watson Ned Goldreyer | Linda Miller Lane Lueras | November 22, 2008 | 125 |
| 26 | "New Pet" "Tak's Monster" | Jim Schumann | Ned Goldreyer Scott Kreamer | Michael Mullen Heiko Drengenberg | November 29, 2008 | 126 |

== Home media ==
Tak and the Power of Juju: The Trouble with Magic was released on June 24, 2008, and contained the episodes Woodiefest, Loser, A Shaman's Shaman, The Gift, The Three Chiefs, The Party, The Beast, To Zaria with Love, Girls Only, and Secession. Tak and the Power of Juju: Season 1 was released on October 17, 2011, and contains all 26 episodes. On September 22, 2021, the series was added to Paramount+, though originally reported for August. As of December 31, 2023, the show was removed from Paramount+.

== KCA preview ==
During the Nickelodeon 2007 Kids' Choice Awards, hosted by Justin Timberlake, a preview was shown of the new show in Nick.com. The site included the preview, a character page and a story page minimally different from the game.

== Differences from the games ==
- Tak, Jibolba, and Tlaloc are recast, being voiced by Hal Sparks, Lloyd Sherr, and Jeff Bennett rather than Jason Marsden, John Kassir, and Rob Paulsen. Additionally, Tlaloc is renamed Traloc.
- Tak's tribe is named Pupununu rather than Pupanunu.
- Dead Juju and Mind-Reader Juju are respectively renamed Party Juju and Psychic Juju. Additionally, S. Scott Bullock voices the latter rather than Rob Paulsen.

== Reception ==
Common Sense Media rated the show a 3 out of 5 stars, stating "Based on a popular Nickelodeon video game, Tak and the Power of Juju is an entertaining CG-animated series full of colorful characters and outlandish scenarios sure to entertain older school-age kids and young tweens. Tak's mix of good intentions and general mischief lays the groundwork for plenty of fun in each episode, and parents will like that there's not much to worry about here, aside from mild, typical cartoon violence. Just be ready for your kids to begging [sic] for the tie-in games once they've developed an affection for the jungle-dwelling cast."

== See also ==
- Tak and the Power of Juju
