= Perfect Harmony (TV series) =

American musical comedy television series

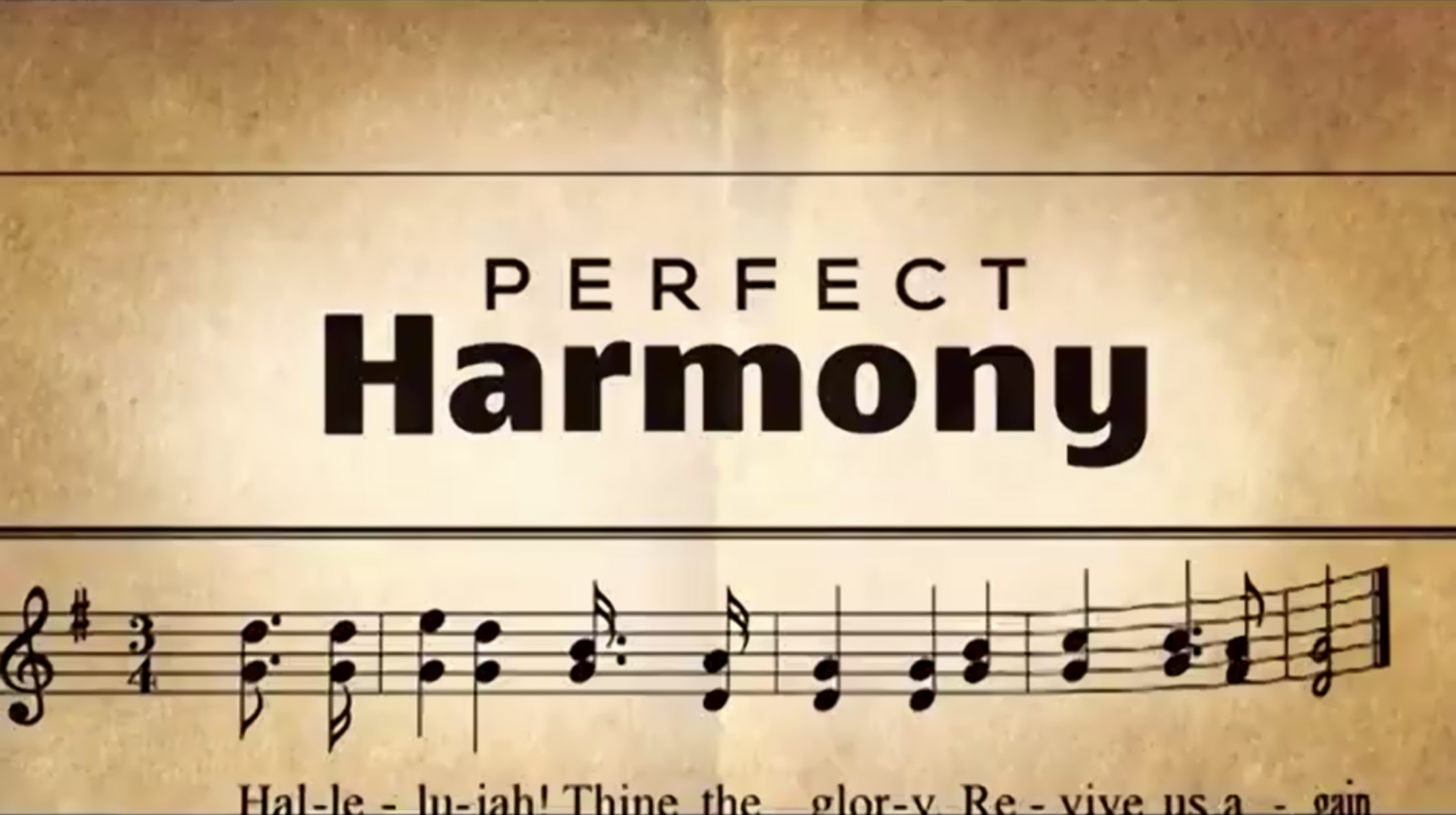
- Genre: Musical; Comedy
- Created by: Lesley Wake Webster
- Starring: Bradley Whitford; Anna Camp; Will Greenberg; Tymberlee Hill; Geno Segers; Rizwan Manji
- Theme music composer: John Jenkins Husband, music; William Paton Mackay, lyrics
- Opening theme: "Revive Us Again"
- Country of origin: United States
- Original language: English
- No. of seasons: 1
- No. of episodes: 13

Production
- Executive producers: Lesley Wake Webster; Bradley Whitford; Jon Radler; Jason Winer; Adam Anders; Bob Daily
- Producer: Justin McEwen
- Cinematography: David Robert Jones
- Editors: Steven Sprung; Hugh Ross
- Camera setup: Single-camera
- Running time: 22 minutes
- Production companies: Hungry Mule Amusement Corp.; Introvert Hangover Productions; Small Dog Picture Company; Universal Television; 20th Century Fox Television

Original release
- Network: NBC
- Release: September 26, 2019 – January 23, 2020

Perfect Harmony is an American musical comedy television series created by Lesley Wake Webster that aired on NBC from September 26, 2019 to January 23, 2020. The series stars Bradley Whitford as Dr. Arthur Cochran, a music director at a small church in the fictional town of Conley Fork, Kentucky, and Anna Camp as Ginny, a single mother and waitress who leads the choir.

The series also stars Will Greenberg, Tymberlee Hill, Geno Segers, Rizwan Manji and Spencer Allport. In June 2020, the series was canceled after one season.

== Premise ==
A rural church gets the choir director it never thought it needed when a salty, Ivy League music professor stumbles through their door.

== Cast ==
- Bradley Whitford as Dr. Arthur Cochran, a recently widowed, non-religious former instructor at Princeton who becomes music director at a small church in the fictional town of Conley Fork, Kentucky. Abrasive and blunt, he sets out to transform the church's failing choir through his unorthodox, yet highly effective methods.
- Anna Camp as Ginny, a single mother and waitress who leads the choir. Sings soprano.
- Will Greenberg as Wayne, Ginny's ex-husband who is also a member of the choir. Sings tenor.
- Tymberlee Hill as Adams, a member of the choir and a local businesswoman. Sings alto.
- Geno Segers as Dwayne, Wayne's best friend and a member of the choir secretly in love with Ginny. Sings bass.
- Rizwan Manji as Reverend Jax, a missionary who runs the church and a member of the choir.
- Spencer Allport as Cash, Ginny and Wayne's son who struggles with dyslexia. His full name is Cassius Clay Hawkins, a reference to Muhammad Ali.

== Production ==
=== Development ===
On October 23, 2018, it was announced that NBC had given the production for the pilot production commitment. On January 25, 2019, the production officially received a pilot order. The pilot was written by Lesley Wake Webster who executive produces alongside Bradley Whitford, Jason Winer, Jon Radler and Adam Anders. Production companies involved with the pilot include Small Dog Picture Company and 20th Century Fox Television. On May 11, 2019, it was announced that the production had been given a series order, together with Indebted and Lincoln Rhyme: Hunt for the Bone Collector. A day after that, it was announced that the series would premiere in the fall of 2019 and air on Thursday night in the 2019–20 television season at 8:30 P.M. The series debuted on September 26, 2019. On June 10, 2020, NBC canceled the series after one season.

=== Casting ===
In February 2019, it was announced that Bradley Whitford, Anna Camp and Will Greenberg had been cast in the pilot's leading roles. Although the pilot was ordered, in March 2019 it was reported that Tymberlee Hill, Geno Segers and Rizwan Manji had joined the cast.

== Episodes ==
No.	Title	Directed by	Written by	Original release date	Prod. code	U.S. viewers (millions)
1	"Pilot"	Jason Winer	Lesley Wake Webster	September 26, 2019	1BYG01	2.63
A depressed music teacher, Arthur Cochran, attempts suicide; before he can finish, he overhears poor singing and passes out while lambasting the singers. The next morning, he finds out that the singers belong to the Second First Church of the Cumberlands, and that their leader, Ginny, wants to hire him as their instructor to help the choir get in shape for an upcoming competition. Arthur is hesitant, but when he learns that the choir slated to win is led by a pastor who denied his late wife's dying wish for her burial, he accepts her offer. Acting on his belief that singing and life are one and the same, he interferes with Ginny's life, urging her to finalize her divorce and encouraging choir member Dwayne to express his feelings for her. Ginny fires him, but when he discovers her son is dyslexic and apologizes for his actions, she forgives him. At the competition, the choir loses despite performing a stellar rendition of "Eye of the Tiger", yet the judges decide to honor their effort by awarding them "Most Improved Choir". The group celebrates by holding a housewarming party for Arthur on his houseboat, welcoming him into their community.
2	"Fork Fest"	Jeffrey Blitz	Elizabeth Tippet	October 3, 2019	1BYG03	2.07
The choir tries to teach Arthur the importance of respecting local traditions when he offends the organizer of the county fair, who retaliates by giving them the worst possible choice of time slots. Newly divorced, Ginny is shocked to discover that gossip has spread through the town, with much of it suggesting that she cheated on her husband. Arthur tries to make amends, but unintentionally insults the organizer by using sanitizer after shaking his hand, leading to the choir being outright banned from performing. Dwayne subsequently informs Arthur that he is not welcome to attend the fair. Ginny tries to shake off the rumors, but everything comes to a head at the pie-eating contest when the audience refuses to applaud for her after she wins. Jax visits Arthur and tells him the story of the town's founding, encouraging him to try and assimilate regardless of whether or not he wants to. Arthur goes to the fair and wins a pig-chasing contest, impressing the organizer and getting the choir their original time slot back. Midway through the performance, Wayne finally defends his ex-wife by admitting that he was to blame for their divorce.
3	"No Time for Losers"	Jason Winer	Lesley Wake Webster	October 10, 2019	1BYG02	2.07
In a bid to win regionals, Arthur selects Ginny to be the choir's soloist, but she refuses due to stage fright. Wayne secretly moves into the church rather than live with Dwayne, which upsets Jax and prompts him to try and find a way to get him out. After seeing Ginny singing "9 to 5" by herself at work, Arthur deduces that her problem is anxiety and offers to help; she agrees after realizing that she needs to set a good example for Cash as he works to improve his reading skills. Dwayne visits Jax for advice, and wrongly assumes that he's an alcoholic on account of him trying to hide Wayne's living situation. Ginny creates a stage persona as "Darlianna Woodbeam" and goes to perform at a local bar's open-mic night, with Arthur inviting the whole choir to support her. Ginny cracks under the pressure, argues with him, and locks herself in the bathroom. Jax finally tells Dwayne the truth, and Wayne forgives him for trying to romance his ex. A heart-to-heart conversation with Arthur restores Ginny's confidence and she crushes her performance. Dwayne and Wayne move back in together so they can start fixing their friendship.
4	"Hunting Season"	Jason Winer	Bob Daily	October 17, 2019	1BYG04	2.12
Tired of Arthur's arrogant attitude, Adams refuses to continue practicing for regionals. In response, Arthur joins the choir for the beginning of deer-hunting season, hoping to win her over. Ginny, concerned about losing Arthur's help as he continues to mentor Cash but not wanting to upset Adams (her boss at the diner), tries to make peace between the two only to get rebuffed several times. Wayne takes Cash for his first hunt, but Cash, influenced by Dwayne's philosophy of non-violence, refuses to kill the deer and runs off while trying to find truffles. Arthur embarrasses Adams by ruining her shot, and she tells him to leave. He becomes lost while trying to find his car, and later runs into Cash. Wayne blames his friend for ruining his chance to be a father to Cash, and they fight until Dwayne reminds Wayne that he needs to let his son pick his own path in life. The choir organizes a search, ending with them finding Cash and Arthur with skunk spray in his eyes after trying to protect the boy. Adams tells Arthur that she will never respect him as an individual, but will allow him to continue teaching at the church.
5	"It's Electric"	Jeffrey Blitz	Joe Cristalli	October 24, 2019	1BYG05	2.01
Arthur's crotchety war veteran father-in-law Tinsley (Kurtwood Smith), who he's always hated, arrives to claim ownership of Arthur's houseboat even though he supposedly gave it to his wife years ago. The church holds a singles mixer, which frightens Ginny due to her growing feelings for Dwayne, who she thinks of as a brother. Tinsley and Arthur have a stand-off until Arthur suddenly gives up and leaves, though not before sabotaging the boat's electrical system. At the mixer, Ginny does everything she can to avoid Dwayne, eventually sitting outside drinking from a flask. Arthur tells her to talk to Dwayne, and she tells him to make peace with Tinsley. Dwayne accepts that he and Ginny are just friends, and instead hooks up with another girl. Tinsley discovers that Arthur has been secretly sending him care packages since his daughter's death, and though the two still despise each other, he relinquishes his claim to the boat. Wayne helps his son deal with an unexpected teenage crush and performs a special slow song so they can have their first dance.
6	"Halle-Boo-Yah"	Todd Biermann	Brian Egeston	October 31, 2019	1BYG06	2.39
Ginny convinces Adams to let her manage the diner for Halloween night, but quickly runs into trouble when she mistakenly announces an award of $1,000 rather than $100 for the costume contest; Arthur agrees to participate so she can avoid having to give away that much money, but his decision to perform as a Chippendales dancer after his first costume is egged by trick-or-treaters causes an uproar among the patrons and Ginny pulls the fire alarm so everyone has to leave. Influenced by his girlfriend Georgia, Dwayne tells Wayne that he won't be part of their annual prank war, upsetting the latter who sees it as proof that their friendship is deteriorating. Instead, he takes Cash to the church's boring Halloween party. There, Jax accidentally stabs himself while trying to meditate between the two sides, which turns out to be an epic prank conceived of by Georgia. Wayne is touched that his friend still cares about their childhood traditions. Adams, impressed by Ginny's quick thinking and business acumen, promotes her to full-time manager of the diner.
7	"Rivalry Week"	Katie Locke O'Brien	Patrick Kang & Michael Levin	November 7, 2019	1BYG07	2.00
A rival church invites the choir to perform, so Arthur decides to recruit Ginny's rival, Kimmy Bell (Laura Bell Bundy), as his new soloist. Upset, and angry with him for trivializing her feelings, Ginny refuses to practice. Dwayne reveals that he has been estranged from his family for the last twenty years owing to his vegetarian lifestyle; when they tell him they won't be attending the show, Wayne encourages him to stand up for himself and demand that they come see him. During an appointment at Kimmy's salon, Arthur questions her and discovers that not only is she a bully, but she has no remorse about the way she treated Ginny. He fires her on the spot, and she retaliates by dying his hair pink. The choir is despondent over their lack of preparation, and Arthur decides to call off the contest rather than embarrass them. When Wayne declares that he'll go anyway to support Dwayne, everyone goes with him. Decked out in pink hair, the choir performs "Titanium" with Dwayne on lead vocals, earning applause from even his family. Arthur and Ginny discover that Kimmy has joined their rivals for the upcoming regionals.
8	"Any Given Monday"	Natalia Anderson	Greg Gallant	November 14, 2019	1BYG08	1.88
Jax must attend to a sick parishioner, so he asks Arthur to fill in for him on Monday morning. At first, Arthur tries to take his duties seriously, offering job advice, watching someone's baby, and teaching Jax's youth group about sexual reproduction. Adams goes to a local clinic for a secret procedure to have her eggs frozen; when Wayne comes to pick her up, she accidentally tells him while under the influence of anesthesia. He takes her home, drinks all of her whiskey, and the two bond over their mutual feelings about raising kids. Problems start popping up at the church: the baby won't stop crying, a couple blames Arthur for their arguing, the youths' parents yell at him for teaching their sons about sex, and Dwayne and his co-chef Karla start a fire while trying to make soup for visiting firefighters. Jax suddenly appears and resolves all of the conflicts, while Arthur makes up for the loss of the soup by paying for the firefighters' lunch at the diner. Arthur mopes about how badly he handled things, but Jax replies that as long as he keeps doing good things for others, that is enough.
9	"Thanks-taking"	Katie Locke O'Brien	Akilah Green	November 21, 2019	1BYG09	1.87
Arthur turns down an invitation to attend a door-to-door Thanksgiving with the choir so he can watch a recording of The Magic Flute. When his laptop disappears, however, he suspects it to be stolen and agrees to join the festivities so he can search each member's house. Adams invites Karl, her handyman, to the party and encourages Ginny to flirt with him, which causes her to injure her knee. Dwayne helps her, which Georgia witnesses; she breaks up with Dwayne after for "cheating" on her. Arthur pays Cash to search each house on his behalf; using a phone app, he finds the laptop in Jax's bag. Jax confesses he stole it to force Arthur to spend time with the choir. Arthur takes his things and leaves in anger. Ginny catches Karl kissing Adams, who he is secretly attracted to, and turns to Wayne for comfort. Jax visits Arthur, who admits that he chooses to be miserable on Thanksgiving because he feels guilty about enjoying himself without his wife. Jax replies that Jean would want him to be happy, and brings over the whole choir for the final stop on their trip. Ginny and Wayne sleep together, and agree to hide it from their son.
10	"Merry Jaxmas"	Bille Woodruff	Venetia Ginakakis	December 12, 2019	1BYG10	1.75
Ginny and Wayne decide that while they want to keep hooking up, they don't want their relationship to be anything more than that lest they develop feelings for each other again. Jax's adoptive missionary parents arrive to visit him for Christmas with his new younger sister Anjali in tow; this horrifies Jax as his parents have always judged him for incorporating secular elements into his work as a minister. To help him, Arthur uses his celebrity to promote the church's annual Christmas concert, which moves to Friday, the same day as the big Wildcats game. Wayne buys Ginny an expensive gift, which she discovers was partially paid for with money from the joint bank account they still share. Arthur deliberately cuts the town's Internet connection to force people to attend the concert, even though doing so means he can't livestream the concert to his fans. He also lets Jax turn the concert program into a Bollywood-style production, which Anjali loves and his parents grudgingly acknowledge as proof that he is doing good work. Wayne agrees to set up his own bank account, but learns from Ginny that she thinks she's pregnant.
11	"Know When to Walk Away"	Tristram Shapeero	Charlotte Austin Johnson	January 9, 2020	1BYG11	1.60
At Conley Fork's annual pageant, judge Arthur tries not to show favoritism.
12	"Hymn-a-Thon"	Michael Spiller	Grasie Mercedes	January 16, 2020	1BYG12	1.35
The choir holds an all-night Hymn-a-Thon.
13	"Regionals"	Jason Winer	Mishki Vaccaro & Eric Wojtanik	January 23, 2020	1BYG13	1.42
Arthur relishes the opportunity to finally stick it to his old rival.

== Release ==
In countries like Australia and New Zealand the show is available to stream on Disney+ Star because 20th Century Fox Television was involved in the show.

=== Marketing ===
On May 12, 2019, NBC released the first official trailer for the series.

== Reception ==
=== Critical response ===
On review aggregation Rotten Tomatoes, the series holds an approval rating of 62% with an average rating of 6.67/10, based on 13 reviews. The website's critical consensus reads, "Perfect Harmony's precarious premise doesn't always hit the right notes, but a charming cast and a few clever jokes inspire hope that with a little more practice it could really sing." Metacritic, which uses a weighted average, assigned the series a score of 54 out of 100 based on 8 critics, indicating "mixed or average reviews".

=== Ratings ===
Viewership and ratings per episode of Perfect Harmony
No.	Title	Air date	Rating/share (18–49)	Viewers (millions)	DVR (18–49)	DVR viewers (millions)	Total (18–49)	Total viewers (millions)
1	"Pilot"	September 26, 2019	0.5/3	2.63	0.3	1.51	0.8	4.13
2	"Fork Fest"	October 3, 2019	0.5/2	2.07	0.2	1.27	0.7	3.34
3	"No Time for Losers"	October 10, 2019	0.5/2	2.07	0.2	1.05	0.7	3.13
4	"Hunting Season"	October 17, 2019	0.4/2	2.12	0.3	0.96	0.7	3.08
5	"It's Electric"	October 24, 2019	0.4/2	2.01	0.3	0.90	0.7	2.91
6	"Halle-Boo-Yah"	October 31, 2019	0.5/2	2.39	0.2	0.82	0.7	3.12
7	"Rivalry Week"	November 7, 2019	0.5/2	2.00	0.2	0.83	0.7	2.83
8	"Any Given Monday"	November 14, 2019	0.4/2	1.88	TBD	TBD	TBD	TBD
9	"Thanks-taking"	November 21, 2019	0.4/2	1.87	TBD	TBD	TBD	TBD
10	"Merry Jaxmas"	December 12, 2019	0.4/2	1.75	TBD	TBD	TBD	TBD
11	"Know When to Walk Away"	January 9, 2020	0.4/2	1.60	TBD	TBD	TBD	TBD
12	"Hymn-a-Thon"	January 16, 2020	0.3/2	1.35	TBD	TBD	TBD	TBD
13	"Regionals"	January 23, 2020	0.3/2	1.42	TBD	TBD	TBD	TBD
