= Corporate (TV series) =

2018 American comedy television series

- Genre: Dark comedy Satire; Tragicomedy
- Created by: Pat Bishop; Matt Ingebretson; Jake Weisman
- Directed by: Pat Bishop; Matt Ingebretson
- Starring: Matt Ingebretson; Jake Weisman; Anne Dudek; Adam Lustick; Aparna Nancherla; Lance Reddick
- Composer: Ty Segall
- Country of origin: United States
- Original language: English
- No. of seasons: 3
- No. of episodes: 26

Production
- Executive producers: Pat Bishop; Matt Ingebretson; Jake Weisman; Jake Fogelnest
- Running time: 22 minutes
- Production companies: Incredible Success!; Comedy Partners

Original release
- Network: Comedy Central
- Release: January 17, 2018 – August 26, 2020

Corporate is an American sitcom created by Pat Bishop, Matt Ingebretson, and Jake Weisman. A ten-episode first season premiered on Comedy Central on January 17, 2018. On February 26, 2018, the series was renewed for a second season. Corporate's third and final season premiered on July 22, 2020.

Ingebretson and Weisman later guest starred as their Corporate characters in their subsequent Hulu series This Fool, of which the first season premiered on August 12, 2022.

== Plot ==
Corporate is set in an office belonging to the fictional multinational corporation Hampton-DeVille and follows the miserable lives of two downtrodden employees and their coworkers.

== Cast ==
=== Main ===
- Matt Ingebretson as Matt Engelbertson
- Jake Weisman as Jake Levinson
- Anne Dudek as Kate Glass
- Adam Lustick as John Strickland
- Aparna Nancherla as Grace Ramaswamy
- Lance Reddick as Christian DeVille

=== Recurring ===
- Matt McCarthy as Richard
- Baron Vaughn as Baron
- Anna Akana as Paige
- Ron Lynch as Kevin
- Toni Trucks as Karen
- Sasheer Zamata as Jessica (season 2)

=== Guest ===
- Jon Daly as Jeff
- William Fichtner as Brett
- Chris Fleming as Todd
- Brian George as Zack the Butler
- Philip Baker Hall as Arthur
- Lauren Lapkus as Peggy
- Natasha Lyonne as Gretchen
- Aimee Mann as Peg
- Norma Michaels as Grandma Dorothy
- Robert Morse as Terry Sales
- Arden Myrin as Courtney
- Bob Odenkirk as the voice of Black Dog
- Elizabeth Perkins as The Accountant
- Andy Richter as himself
- Richard Riehle as Hubert
- Kyra Sedgwick as Mrs. Cowboy
- Kristen Schaal as Sheena
- Nicole Sullivan as Linda Lee
- Paul F. Tompkins as Agent Roman
- Kate Walsh as Alyssa Armstrong
- Melora Walters as Nadine
- Brent Weinbach as Walter
- Fred Willard as Bill Hathaway

== Episodes ==
Season	Episodes	Originally released	
Season	Episodes	First released	Last released
1	10	January 17, 2018	March 14, 2018
2	10	January 15, 2019	March 19, 2019
3	6	July 22, 2020	August 26, 2020

=== Season 1 (2018) ===
No. overall	No. in season	Title	Directed by	Written by	Original release date	Prod. code	U.S. viewers (millions)
1	1	"The Void"	Pat Bishop	Pat Bishop & Matt Ingebretson & Jake Weisman	December 4, 2017 (online); January 17, 2018 (Comedy Central)	101	0.404
2	2	"The Powerpoint of Death"	Pat Bishop	Pat Bishop	December 19, 2017 (online); January 17, 2018 (Comedy Central)	102	0.333
3	3	"The Pain of Being Alive"	Pat Bishop	Kate Thulin	December 20, 2017 (online); January 24, 2018 (Comedy Central)	103	0.275
4	4	"Trademarq"	Pat Bishop	Heather Anne Campbell	December 21, 2017 (online); January 31, 2018 (Comedy Central)	104	0.280
5	5	"Corporate Retreat"	Pat Bishop	Amelie Gillette	February 7, 2018	105	0.235
6	6	"Casual Friday"	Pat Bishop	Jake Weisman	February 14, 2018	106	0.273
7	7	"The Long Meeting"	Pat Bishop	Matt Ingebretson	February 21, 2018	107	0.229
8	8	"Society Tomorrow"	Pat Bishop	Jake Fogelnest	February 28, 2018	108	0.202
9	9	"Weekend"	Pat Bishop	Amelie Gillette	March 7, 2018	109	0.307
10	10	"Remember Day"	Pat Bishop	Heather Anne Campbell	March 14, 2018	110	0.238

=== Season 2 (2019) ===
No. overall	No. in season	Title	Directed by	Written by	Original release date	Prod. code	U.S. viewers (millions)
11	1	"The One Who's There"	Pat Bishop	Pat Bishop & Matt Ingebretson & Jake Weisman	January 15, 2019	201	0.262
12	2	"The Concert"	Pat Bishop	Matt Ingebretson & Jake Weisman	January 22, 2019	203	0.244
13	3	"Natural Beauty"	Pat Bishop	Langan Kingsley	January 29, 2019	204	0.281
14	4	"Thanks!"	Matt Ingebretson	Pat Bishop	February 5, 2019	202	0.215
15	5	"The Expense Report"	Pat Bishop	Jessica Gao	February 12, 2019	205	0.246
16	6	"Mattchiavelli and the Piss Detective"	Pat Bishop	Pat Bishop	February 19, 2019	206	0.221
17	7	"Labor Day"	Pat Bishop	Matt Ingebretson & Jake Weisman	February 26, 2019	207	0.187
18	8	"The Tragedy"	Pat Bishop	Bridger Winegar	March 5, 2019	208	0.208
19	9	"Vacation"	Pat Bishop	Matt Ingebretson & Jake Weisman	March 12, 2019	209	0.237
20	10	"The Fall"	Pat Bishop	Jessica Gao	March 12, 2019	210	0.171

=== Season 3 (2020) ===
No. overall	No. in season	Title	Directed by	Written by	Original release date	Prod. code	U.S. viewers (millions)
21	1	"Pickles 4 Breakfast"	Pat Bishop	Pat Bishop & Matt Ingebretson	July 22, 2020	301	0.258
22	2	"Black Dog"	Pat Bishop	Jake Weisman	July 29, 2020	302	0.260
23	3	"The Importance of Talking Shit by Oscar Wilde"	Matt Ingebretson	Paige Weldon	August 5, 2020	303	0.270
24	4	"Good Job"	Pat Bishop	Bridger Winegar	August 12, 2020	304	0.239
25	5	"Fuck You Money"	Pat Bishop	Caroline Anderson	August 19, 2020	305	0.238
26	6	"The Wind of God"	Pat Bishop	Pat Bishop & Matt Ingebretson	August 26, 2020	306	0.246

== Reception ==
=== Critical response ===
On the review aggregator Rotten Tomatoes, the first season has an approval rating of 87% based on 15 reviews, with an average rating of 8/10. The website's critics consensus reads, "Corporate takes a bleak, absurdist look at corporate life to deliver a clever show with a more nihilistic bent than your typical workplace comedy." On Metacritic, which assigns a normalized rating, the first season has a score 75 out of 100, based on 7 critics, indicating "generally favorable reviews". On Rotten Tomatoes, the second season has a 100% approval rating based on 7 reviews with an average rating of 9/10, and the third season has a 100% approval rating based on 6 reviews with an average rating of 8.5/10.

Variety reviewed the series, calling it, "Deliciously dark and hilariously ruthless ... a scathing satire of contemporary office culture that feels long, long overdue." Adweek also lauded the show saying, "It's the kind of universe building that's usually reserved for prestige dramas ... or big-budget sci-fi feature films.”

=== Ratings ===
==== Season 1 ====
Viewership and ratings per episode of Corporate
No.	Title	Air date	Rating (18–49)	Viewers (millions)
1	"The Void"	January 17, 2018	0.21	0.404
2	"The Powerpoint of Death"	January 17, 2018	0.17	0.333
3	"The Pain of Being Alive"	January 24, 2018	0.16	0.275
4	"Trademarq"	January 31, 2018	0.16	0.28
5	"Corporate Retreat"	February 7, 2018	0.14	0.235
6	"Casual Friday"	February 14, 2018	0.15	0.273
7	"The Long Meeting"	February 21, 2018	0.13	0.229
8	"Society Tomorrow"	February 28, 2018	0.09	0.202
9	"Weekend"	March 7, 2018	0.17	0.307
10	"Remember Day"	March 14, 2018	0.13	0.238

==== Season 2 ====
Viewership and ratings per episode of Corporate
No.	Title	Air date	Rating (18–49)	Viewers (millions)
1	"The One Who's There"	January 15, 2019	0.14	0.262
2	"The Concert"	January 22, 2019	0.13	0.244
3	"Natural Beauty"	January 29, 2019	0.17	0.281
4	"Thanks!"	February 5, 2019	0.11	0.215
5	"The Expense Report"	February 12, 2019	0.15	0.246
6	"Mattchiavelli and the Piss Detective"	February 19, 2019	0.11	0.221
7	"Labor Day"	February 26, 2019	0.09	0.187
8	"The Tragedy"	March 5, 2019	0.11	0.208
9	"Vacation"	March 12, 2019	0.12	0.237
10	"The Fall"	March 19, 2019	0.09	0.171

==== Season 3 ====
Viewership and ratings per episode of Corporate
No.	Title	Air date	Rating (18–49)	Viewers (millions)
1	"Pickles 4 Breakfast"	July 22, 2020	0.13	0.258
2	"Black Dog"	July 29, 2020	0.15	0.260
3	"The Importance of Talking Shit by Oscar Wilde"	August 5, 2020	0.14	0.270
4	"Good Job"	August 12, 2020	0.11	0.239
5	"Fuck You Money"	August 19, 2020	0.13	0.238
6	"The Wind of God"	August 26, 2020	0.15	0.246
