= Straight Plan for the Gay Man =

American reality television series

- Genre: Reality television
- Country of origin: United States
- No. of seasons: 1
- No. of episodes: 3

Production
- Running time: 43–54 minutes

Original release
- Network: Comedy Central
- Release: February 23 – October 30, 2004

Straight Plan for the Gay Man is an American comedy television series that premiered on February 23, 2004, on Comedy Central. It is a parody of Bravo's hit Queer Eye for the Straight Guy. Four straight comedians (the "Flab Four") – Curtis Gwinn (environment guy), Billy Merritt (appearance guy), Kyle Grooms (information guy), and Rob Riggle (culture guy) – make over three gay men to pass as straight. The show ran for three episodes.

The makeovers include lessons in poor manners, spartan home decorating, unfashionable wardrobes, and an overdeveloped ego to mask all personal failings. Episodes involved making over a fashion salesman into a meat-packer, a yoga instructor into a jock, and an entertainer into a suave "babe-magnet".

== Reception ==
The show received mostly negative reception from critics. Niamh Slevin of The Michigan Daily gave the series one star out of five, calling it "nothing short of pitiful" and saying that "Comedy Central should be ashamed to produce something as bland and trite as Straight Plan." The Chicago Tribune's review stated that, while the show's direct references to Queer Eye are funny, "there’s no place for this to go, really, beyond paying homage to the far funnier [...] Queer Eye, while indulging in the most obvious Man Show stereotypes about straights." In a more favorable review, Alessandra Stanley of The New York Times called the show "as engaging as the show it mercilessly mocks," and that each of the three episodes was "similar, yet just different enough to hold viewers' attention."

== See also ==
- LGBT stereotypes
- Straight-acting
