= Rob Riggle =

American actor, comedian and former Marine Corps officer (born 1970)

- Riggle in 2026
- Born: Robert Allen Riggle Jr. 21 April 1970 (age 56); Louisville, Kentucky, U.S.
- Education: University of Kansas (BA); Webster University (MPA)
- Occupations: Actor, comedian, retired U.S. marine officer
- Years active: 1998–present
- Spouse: Tiffany Riggle (m. 1999; sep. 2020)
- Children: 2
- Military career
- Allegiance: United States
- Branch: United States Marine Corps; Marine Corps Reserve
- Service years: 1990–2013
- Rank: Lieutenant colonel
- Conflicts: Kosovo War; War in Afghanistan; Iraq War (USO)
- Website: www.robriggle.com

Robert Allen Riggle Jr. (born 21 April 1970) is an American actor, stand-up comedian, and retired United States Marine officer. He was born in Louisville, Kentucky, joining the Marines in 1990 and later attaining the rank of lieutenant colonel.

Riggle is known for his work as a correspondent on Comedy Central's The Daily Show from 2006 to 2008; as a cast member on the NBC sketch comedy series Saturday Night Live from 2004 to 2005; as the recurring character Gil Thorpe on the 20th Television sitcom Modern Family from 2013 to 2019; and for his comedic roles in films such as Step Brothers (2008), The Hangover (2009), Killers (2010), The Internship (2013), Let's Be Cops (2014), My Big Fat Greek Wedding 2 (2016), and How to Be a Latin Lover (2017). He has also co-starred in the Adult Swim comedy-action series NTSF:SD:SUV::. In 2012, he replaced Frank Caliendo for the comedy skit and prognostication portions of Fox NFL Sunday. Riggle co-hosted the miniature golf game show series Holey Moley with Joe Tessitore on ABC from 2019 to 2022.

His voice acting work includes Bob's Burgers, Rick and Morty, and The Loud House. In film, he voiced roles in the Hotel Transylvania franchise (2012–present) and The Lorax (2012).

== Early life ==
Robert Allen Riggle Jr. was born on 21 April 1970, in Louisville, Kentucky, the son of Sandra and Robert Allen Riggle Sr., who worked in insurance. His family moved to Overland Park, Kansas when he was two. He attended Shawnee Mission South High School, where he was involved in the school's radio and TV stations. He was voted the most humorous in high school and graduated in 1988. He later attended the University of Kansas, where he was a member of the Phi Gamma Delta fraternity, attained his pilot's license, and graduated with a Bachelor of Arts in Theater and Film in 1992. He went on to earn a Master of Public Administration degree from Webster University in 1997.

== Military career ==
Riggle joined the Marines in 1990 after getting his pilot's license, intending to become a naval aviator, but left flight school to pursue a comedy career. Riggle was a member of the United States Marine Corps Reserve and often referred to his military experiences on The Daily Show, including acting as the show's "military analyst" and joking that he could kill any other member of the show. In his capacity as a Reserve officer, Riggle assisted with recovery efforts in the aftermath of the September 11 attacks at Ground Zero in Lower Manhattan, and was deployed to Afghanistan twice, in 2001 and 2002.

In August 2007, he went to Iraq to report for The Daily Show and to entertain troops under the purview of the USO.

Riggle was a public affairs officer with a New York City-based unit; he served in Liberia, Kosovo, Albania, and Afghanistan. He attained the rank of lieutenant colonel and received the Meritorious Service Medal (2); Navy and Marine Corps Commendation Medal; Joint Service Achievement Medal; Navy and Marine Corps Achievement Medal (2); Combat Action Ribbon (earned during his tour in Kosovo); National Defense Service Medal (2); Kosovo Campaign Medal; Afghanistan Campaign Medal; Global War on Terrorism Service Medal; Humanitarian Service Medal; Armed Forces Reserve Medal; and NATO Medal.

On 1 January 2013, he retired from the Marine Corps Reserve after 23 years of service.

=== Awards and decorations ===

- Meritorious Service Medal with one gold award star (2 awards)
- Navy and Marine Corps Commendation Medal
- Joint Service Achievement Medal
- Navy and Marine Corps Achievement Medal with one gold award star (2 awards)
- Combat Action Ribbon
- National Defense Service Medal with one bronze service star (2 awards)
- Kosovo Campaign Medal with one bronze campaign star
- Afghanistan Campaign Medal with one bronze campaign star
- Global War on Terrorism Service Medal
- Humanitarian Service Medal
- Armed Forces Reserve Medal
- NATO Medal for the former Yugoslavia

== Comedy career ==
=== Comedy partnership with Rob Huebel ===
Riggle has a long-standing comedic partnership with comedian Rob Huebel, with whom he frequently appears at the Upright Citizens Brigade Theater (UCBT) and in their former improvisational sketch comedy troupe Respecto Montalban. Perhaps the duo's best known creation was their long running two-man show Kung Fu Grip which they performed at UCBT and other comedy venues for many years, and in the 2004 HBO Comedy Arts Festival. Around this time, they began appearing together in several of Comedy Central and VH1's "talking head" commentary programs such as Best Week Ever and A2Z. They also appeared in Bravo network's 100 Scariest Movie Moments special in 2004. These appearances got the duo their first exposure to television viewers and made them favorites among VH1 viewers. Riggle, Huebel and most of their castmates from Respecto Montalban also performed in sketches on Late Night with Conan O'Brien through the late 1990s and early 2000s.

The duo's growing popularity landed them an audition on Saturday Night Live in the summer of 2004. They auditioned together, though only Riggle ended up making the cut. After spending one season on Saturday Night Live from 2004 to 2005, Riggle soon joined Huebel and many of his other Respecto Montalban castmates in Los Angeles to work on new projects. Soon after, the two landed a holding deal at NBC in early 2006 to develop a half-hour comedy program, though it never reached production.

In September 2006, Riggle joined The Daily Show as a regular correspondent. Around the same time, Huebel (along with Respecto Montalban member Paul Scheer and stand-up comic Aziz Ansari) started developing Human Giant, a sketch show for MTV. Riggle often appeared in the show's sketches, and in its 24-hour live marathon which aired in May 2007. One of Riggle's most memorable appearances was as hired muscle Ham-Bone, who appeared alongside Aziz Ansari in the season one sketch "Clell Tickle: Indie Marketing Guru". Riggle and Huebel can also be seen on stage at the UCBT in Doug Benson's documentary Super High Me.

=== Saturday Night Live ===
A featured player during the 2004–2005 season, Riggle's first appearance as a SNL cast member was on the show's 30th-season premiere on 2 October 2004. He has portrayed Larry the Cable Guy, Howard Dean, Rick Sanchez, Mark McGwire, and Toby Keith. He had a one-shot character named Leviticus, a loud, violent street preacher who only appeared on a Weekend Update segment on the Christmas episode hosted by Robert De Niro (though another sketch featuring Leviticus scheduled to air on the episode hosted by Hilary Swank was cut after dress rehearsal).

Prior to becoming a cast member, Riggle appeared in a non-speaking role during season 29 in a pre-taped parody of Fear Factor, where he played the father of one of the child contestants during the "Breakfast in Bed" challenge, in which a child must eat the maggots off a plate of Eggs Benedict with the understanding that failing to do so results in the divorce of his parents.

=== The Daily Show ===
In September 2006, Riggle joined the cast of The Daily Show to replace the departing Rob Corddry, and his debut on 20 September 2006.

TV Guide cited Riggle's segment "Marines in Berkeley" where he donned hippie regalia to spoof University of California, Berkeley peace activists protesting a local Marines recruiting station.

During the 2008 Olympics, Riggle traveled to China to tape sketches for The Daily Show, producing the four-part special feature "Rob Riggle: Chasing the Dragon".

Riggle left The Daily Show on 10 December 2008, in his words "to go fight crime"; however, he appeared at Bonnaroo 2009—with John Oliver and Rory Albanese, one of the show's executive producers—in a show entitled An Evening (or Afternoon) with The Daily Show featuring John Oliver, Rob Riggle & Rory Albanese.

=== Stand-up comedy ===
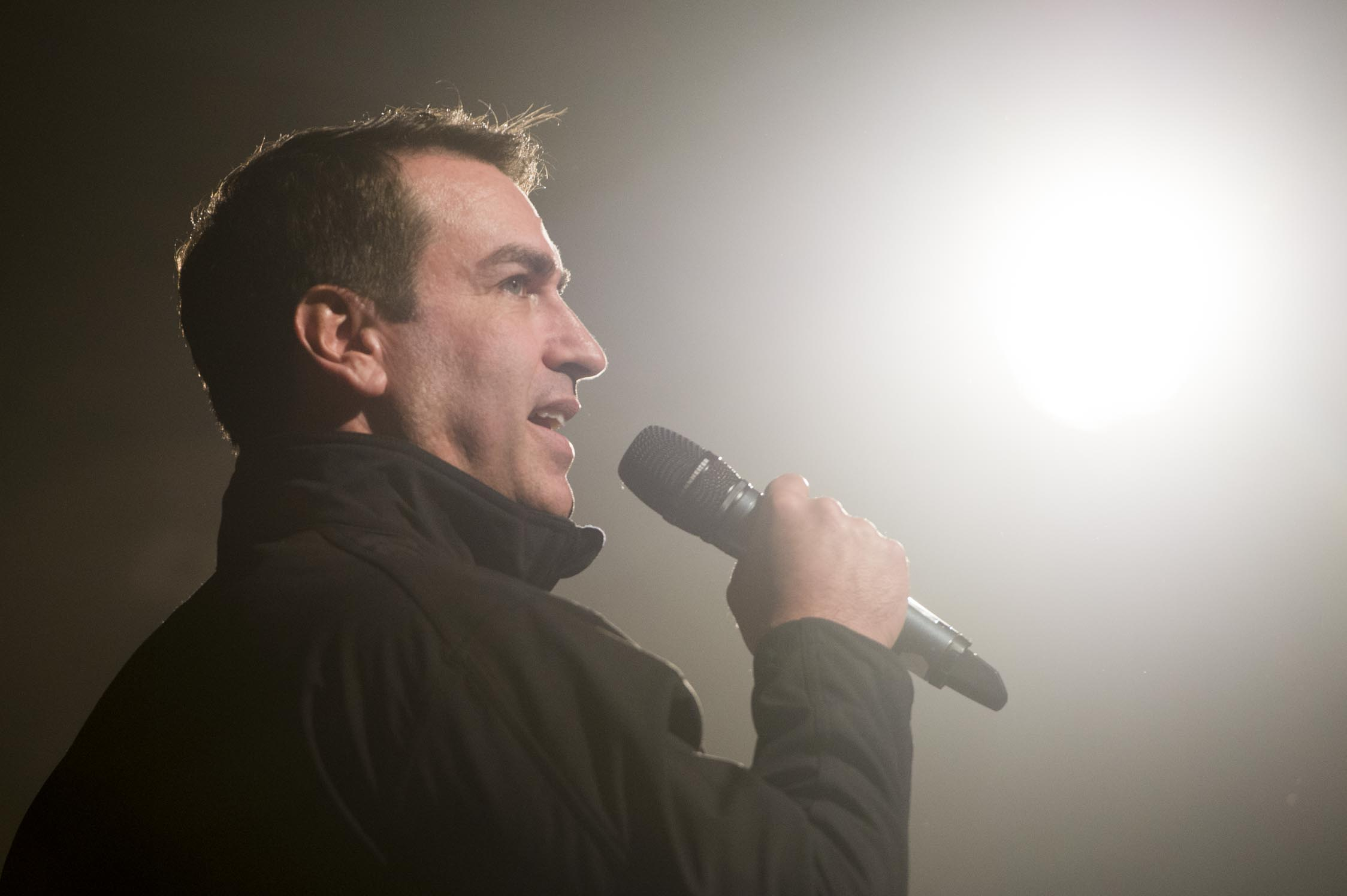
Riggle performing in 2014

Previously, Riggle's live comedy work was mostly improvisational and sketch-based. Beginning in 2006, he wanted to try something different and decided to create a stand-up act. After working on it in various comedy clubs in New York City, he toured colleges and other comedy clubs, often performing with John Oliver and other Daily Show writers. He credits Oliver for encouraging him to try stand-up while they shared an office at The Daily Show.

Riggle hosted an episode of Comedy Central's stand-up series Live at Gotham on 4 December 2009, and taped a Comedy Central Presents special that aired on 5 March 2010.

=== Other work ===
Riggle played Eddie Reynolds in Blackballed: The Bobby Dukes Story, a 2004 film starring Rob Corddry, and featuring almost all of the Respecto Montalban group. Later that year Riggle was one of the "Flab Four" on the Comedy Central mini-series Straight Plan for the Gay Man, a parody of Queer Eye for the Straight Guy that ran for three episodes.

In 2006, Riggle guest-starred as a boat captain named Captain Jack on the "Booze Cruise" episode of The Office, and as an anti-euthanasia activist on Arrested Development. He was also seen as a NASCAR announcer in the comedy film Talladega Nights with Will Ferrell.

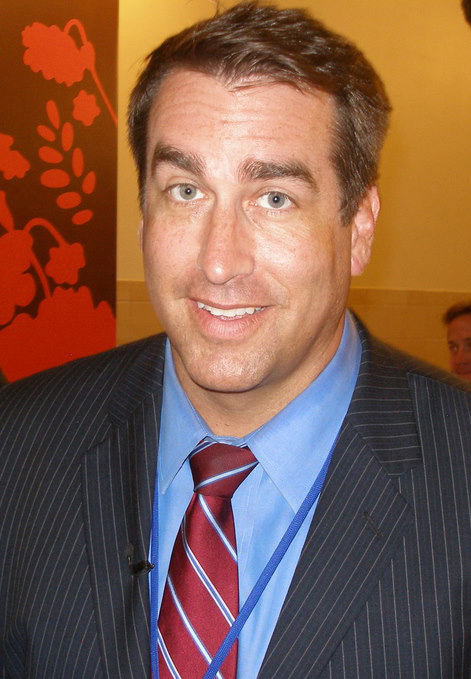
Riggle in 2008

In late 2007, Riggle began appearing as a spokesman in a series of Budweiser commercials. In 2008 he signed a talent holding contract with CBS and CBS Paramount Network TV, which included a development deal to create and star in a half-hour comedy series. He also gained a supporting role in Step Brothers, where he plays a rude co-worker of Brennan's (Will Ferrell). He had memorable supporting roles in the 2009 films The Hangover and The Goods: Live Hard, Sell Hard, and supporting roles in the 2010 comedies Going the Distance, Killers, and The Other Guys.

In 2009, Riggle started a recurring role on the CBS sitcom Gary Unmarried, playing Mitch, Jay Mohr's brother from the Marines.

In 2010, Riggle and comedian Paul Scheer wrote and starred in "Designated Driver", a series of sketches for the first season of the HBO comedy show Funny or Die Presents. Riggle, Scheer, and Rob Huebel also wrote and starred in a series of sketches called "Death Hunt" in the show's second season in 2011.

For the 2010–2011 NFL football season, Riggle recorded a Monday Night Football introduction and several short comedy bits for the Kansas City Chiefs to be played at Arrowhead Stadium in Kansas City, Missouri. He played the lead in the 2011 CBS sitcom pilot Home Game, executive produced by Mark Wahlberg.

Riggle is seen in stadium monitors at Qwest Field during Seattle Seahawks games, encouraging fans to cheer.

In May 2011, Riggle appeared in a two-minute short on funnyordie.com as the U.S. Navy SEAL who killed Osama bin Laden. He plays a humble US Navy Lieutenant (though the insignia on his uniform displays three solid gold bands, indicating the O-5 rank of a USN commander) who, upon being awarded the Distinguished Service Cross, pledges absolute discretion, then gets intoxicated at a local bar and boasts unreservedly to a large crowd that he was bin Laden's assassin.

From 2011 to 2013, Riggle co-starred as the President of the Navy in the Adult Swim comedy-action series NTSF:SD:SUV::. On 11 July 2012, he hosted the 2012 ESPY Awards.

In 2012, Riggle had a recurring role as Kevin Jesquire in season two of the FX comedy series Wilfred. He also began the recurring role of Gil Thorpe, the real-estate rival of Phil Dunphy (played by Ty Burrell), on the comedy series Modern Family, which continued through the show's 11th and final season in 2020.

In October 2013, he played Satan in the music video for Steel Panther's "Party Like Tomorrow is the End of the World".

In 2014, he was expected to star with Rob Lowe in the pilot for the single-camera comedy The Pro as Bobby Welch, a former professional tennis player. but the series was not picked up. Riggle appeared as Frank West in the 2015 film Dead Rising: Watchtower.

In August 2016, Riggle appeared at the Comedy Central Roast of Rob Lowe.

From September 2016, Riggle took over the role of Colonel Sanders in the KFC ad campaigns, following other comedians including Norm Macdonald and Darrell Hammond.

From 2019 to 2021, Riggle co-hosted the miniature golf game show Holey Moley with Stephen Curry and Joe Tessitore.

In 2023, Riggle voiced Glorlox, an alien bounty hunter and recurring character in My Dad the Bounty Hunter.

=== Fox NFL Sunday ===
Beginning with the 19th-season premiere of the Fox NFL Sunday pre-game show on 9 September 2012, Riggle took over the comedy skit and prognosticator portions previously performed by Frank Caliendo from 2003 to 2011. Riggle did not return to the Fox NFL pre-game show in 2020.

== Personal life ==
Riggle married his wife Tiffany on 13 April 1999, and they have two children. They filed for divorce in October 2020.

In June 2021, Riggle publicly claimed that his estranged wife had hacked his personal Apple account, had stolen money from his home, and was spying on him. Later that month, Riggle was granted a temporary restraining order against her after finding a hidden camera, disguised as a smoke detector, in his home with more than 10,000 videos stored in it — some of which support his claims. A second hearing was scheduled for July 2021 at Riggle's request for a forensic expert to go through the footage obtained through the hidden camera.

== Filmography ==
=== Film ===
Year	Title	Role	Notes
2003	Pushing Tom	Bob	
2004	Blackballed: The Bobby Dukes Story	Eddie Reynolds	
2004	Terrorists	Badger	
2006	Talladega Nights: The Ballad of Ricky Bobby	Jack Telmont	
2006	Unaccompanied Minors	Head Guard Hoffman	
2007	Super High Me	Himself	
2007	Wild Girls Gone		
2008	Step Brothers	Randy	
2009	The Goods: Live Hard, Sell Hard	Peter Selleck	
2009	The Hangover	Officer Franklin	
2009	May the Best Man Win	John Freeman	
2010	Furry Vengeance	Riggs	
2010	Going the Distance	Ron	
2010	Killers	Henry	
2010	The Other Guys	Detective Evan Martin	
2010	High Road	James Malone Sr.	
2011	Larry Crowne	Jack Strang	
2011	Prep & Landing: Naughty vs. Nice	Noel	Voice
2012	Big Miracle	Dean Glowacki	
2012	The Lorax	Aloysius O'Hare	Voice
2012	21 Jump Street	Mr. Walters	
2012	Hotel Transylvania	Skeleton Husband	Voice
2012	Nature Calls	Gentry	
2013	The Internship	Randy	
2014	Just Before I Go	Rawly Stansfield	
2014	22 Jump Street	Mr. Walters	Uncredited
2014	Let's Be Cops	Officer Segars	
2014	Dumb and Dumber To	Travis and Captain Lippencott	
2015	Absolutely Anything	Grant	
2015	Dead Rising: Watchtower	Frank West	
2015	Hotel Transylvania 2	Bela	Voice
2015	Hell and Back	Curt	Voice
2016	My Big Fat Greek Wedding 2	Northwestern Rep	
2016	Opening Night	Goldmeyer	
2016	Middle School: The Worst Years of My Life	Bear	
2016	True Memoirs of an International Assassin	William Cobb	
2017	How to Be a Latin Lover	Scott	
2017	A Happening of Monumental Proportions	Ned Pendlehorn	
2017	The Emoji Movie	Ice cream emoji	Uncredited voice role
2018	12 Strong	Colonel Max Bowers	
2018	Midnight Sun	Jack	
2018	Status Update	Darryl Moore	
2018	Night School	Mackenzie	
2018	Henchmen	Biff	Voice
2019	UglyDolls	Exposition Robot	Voice
2020	The War with Grandpa	Arthur	
2022	The Curse of Bridge Hollow	Sully	
2023	Strays	Rolf	Voice
2025	Code 3	Dr. Serano	
2025	Bad Man	Chief Sandy	
2026	The Pirate King	Todd	
2026	Don't Move	Paul DeLuca	
2026	Nickels	Tom Monroe	
2026	Christmas at the Kringles	Drunk Santa	
2026	Jimmy	Colonel Terrill	
TBA	The Ark and the Aardvark	The Todd	Voice; in production

=== Television ===
Year	Title	Role	Notes
1998–2004	Late Night with Conan O'Brien	Various Characters	
1998–2000	Upright Citizens Brigade	Various Characters	5 episodes
2004	Straight Plan for the Gay Man	Rob: Culture Guy	3 episodes
2004	Chappelle's Show	Debt Consolidation Pop-Up	
2004–05	Saturday Night Live	Cast Member	20 episodes
2005–06	Love, Inc.	Major Curtis	2 episodes
2006	The Office	Captain Jack	Episode: "Booze Cruise"
2006	Arrested Development	Congressman John Van Huesen	
2006–07	Campus Ladies	Glen	2 episodes
2006–08	The Daily Show	Correspondent	86 episodes
2007	Family Values	Theo Gladdings	Sitcom Pilot
2007–08	Human Giant	Various Characters	6 episodes
2007–08	Bronx World Travelers	Coach	2 episodes
2009–10	Gary Unmarried	Mitch	7 episodes
2009–22	American Dad!	Various Voices	7 episodes
2010	Chuck	Jim Rye	
2010, 2012	The Cleveland Show	Chet Butler (voice)	2 episodes
2010	Comedy Central Presents	Himself	
2010	Glenn Martin DDS	Duke	
2010	Team Spitz	Jeff Spitz	CBS Sitcom Pilot
2010–11	Funny or Die Presents	Various Characters	7 episodes
2011	30 Rock	Reggie	Episode: "I Heart Connecticut"
2011	Childrens Hospital	Dr. Brock Stryker	
2011	Happy Endings	Drew	Episode: "Full Court Dress"
2011	Home Game	Joe Allen	CBS Sitcom Pilot
2011	Ugly Americans	Drill Sergeant	
2011–13	NTSF:SD:SUV::	President of the Navy	16 episodes
2012	Victorious	Vice Principal Dickers	Episode: "The Breakfast Bunch"
2012	World Series of Dating	Host	2 episodes
2012	Wilfred	Kevin Jesquire	4 episodes
2012	Fox NFL Sunday	Self	First appearance on 9 September 2012
2012–16	New Girl	Big Schmidt	4 episodes
2013, 2016	Drunk History	J. Edgar Hoover / Teddy Roosevelt	2 episodes
2013–19	Modern Family	Gil Thorpe	7 episodes
2014	The Pro	Bobby Welch	NBC Sitcom Pilot
2014	Bad Judge	Chet	Episode: "Judge and Jury"
2014	The League	Bethesda	3 episodes
2015	Marry Me	Officer Gary Bric	
2015	Golan the Insatiable	Golan the Insatiable (voice)	6 episodes
2015	Key & Peele	Ron's boss	Episode: "Hollywood Sequel Doctor"
2015	Randy Cunningham: 9th Grade Ninja	Rorg (voice); QT Bot (voice)	Episode: "Rorg: A Hero of a Past"; Episode: "Escape From Scrap City"
2015	Playing House	Buck Finch	Episode: "Knotty Pine"
2015	Fresh Off the Boat	Gator Dan	Episode: "Family Business Trip"
2016	Teachers	Don Larondasack	Episode: "Picture Day"
2016	Wander Over Yonder	Bill (voice)	Episode: "The Family Reunion/The Rival"
2016	Comedy Central Roast of Rob Lowe	Himself/roaster	Television special
2016	Albert	Cactus Pete	Voice, television film
2016	Lip Sync Battle	Himself	Episode: "Rob Riggle vs. Jeff Dye"
2016	Son of Zorn	Headbutt Man (voice)	2 episodes
2017	The Simpsons	Dr. Fenton Pooltoy (voice)	Episode: "A Father's Watch"
2017	Angie Tribeca	Detective Zachary Fontaine	4 episodes
2017	Bob's Burgers	Austin (voice)	Episode: "Into the Mild"
2018	Big Hero 6: The Series	Greg Jack (voice)	Episode: "The Impatient Patient"
2018	The Epic Tales of Captain Underpants	Theodore "Ted" Murdsly (voice)	Episode: "Captain Underpants and the Flustering Mindless Woe of the Memory Wipes"
2018–22	Fancy Nancy	Doug Clancy (voice)	52 episodes
2018	Rob Riggle's Ski Master Academy	Himself	8 episodes
2019	Schooled	Alan Buccholz	Episode: "Tamagotchis and Bells"
2019	Brooklyn Nine-Nine	Rob Dulubnik	Episode: "A Tale of Two Bandits"
2019	Big Mouth	Sgt. Adderall (voice)	Episode: "The ASSes"
2019	Archibald's Next Big Thing	Sea Captain (voice)	Episode: "The Oath of the Compass/Garbage Fruit"
2019-20	Rob Riggle: Global Investigator	Himself	6 episodes
2019–22	Holey Moley	Color commentator	
2020	Hoops	Barry Hopkins (voice)	7 episodes
2020	Bless the Harts	Coach Fowler (voice)	Episode: "The McEntire Truth"
2020–21	The Unicorn	Trey	2 episodes
2021	Holey Moley Australia	Commentator	
2021	Celebrity Wheel of Fortune	Himself	Episode: "Rob Riggle, Joe Tessitore & Jeannie Mai"
2021	Big City Greens	Community Dan (voice)	Episode: "Bat Girl"
2021	Adam Carolla: Truth Yeller	Himself	
2022	Jellystone!	Blue Falcon (voice)	Episode: "Heroes and Capes"
2022	The Proud Family: Louder and Prouder	Himself (voice)	Episode: "Get In"
2022	Last Week Tonight with John Oliver	Narrator (voice)	Episode: "Trucks"
2022	Impractical Jokers	Himself	Episode: "Rob Riggle"
2023	My Dad the Bounty Hunter	Glorlox	Voice; recurring role
2023	Krapopolis	Sportscaster #2 (voice)	Episode: "The Stuperbowl"
2023	Barmageddon	Himself	Episode: "Rob Riggle vs. Chris Hardwick"
2023–present	The Loud House	Lance Loud (voice)	4 episodes
2024	Curb Your Enthusiasm	Hobie Turner	Episode: "Disgruntled"
2024	Mr. Birchum	Gunderson (voice)	Episode: "Thank You for Your Meal Service"
2024	Elsbeth	Neal Dorsey	Episode: "The Wrong Stuff"
2025	Krapopolis	King Chadalus (voice)	Episode: "Society of Swords"
2025	Lego Marvel Avengers: Strange Tails	Juggernaut / Cain Marko (voice)	Disney + television film
2026	Rick and Morty	Bowser (voice)	Episode: "Rick Days, Seven Nights"
