= The Goods: Live Hard, Sell Hard =

- Theatrical release poster
- Directed by: Neal Brennan
- Written by: Andy Stock; Rick Stempson
- Produced by: Adam McKay; Will Ferrell; Kevin Messick; Chris Henchy
- Starring: Jeremy Piven; Ving Rhames; James Brolin; David Koechner; Kathryn Hahn; Ed Helms; Jordana Spiro; Craig Robinson
- Cinematography: Daryn Okada
- Edited by: Michael Jablow; Kevin Tent
- Music by: Lyle Workman
- Production companies: Paramount Vantage; Gary Sanchez Productions; Kevin Messick Productions
- Distributed by: Paramount Pictures
- Release date: August 14, 2009 (United States)
- Running time: 90 minutes
- Country: United States
- Language: English
- Budget: $10 million
- Box office: $15.3 million

The Goods: Live Hard, Sell Hard is a 2009 American comedy film directed by Neal Brennan, produced by Adam McKay, Will Ferrell, Kevin Messick and Chris Henchy, written by Andy Stock and Rick Stempson and starring Jeremy Piven, Ving Rhames, James Brolin, David Koechner, Kathryn Hahn, Ed Helms, Jordana Spiro and Craig Robinson. Originally titled The Goods: The Don Ready Story, the film was theatrically released on August 14, 2009 in the United States by Paramount Pictures and was released on DVD as a rental only with no special features November 17 and for sale December 15. The film received mostly negative reviews from critics and grossed $15.3 million against a $10 million budget.

== Plot ==
Ben Selleck's car dealership, in Temecula, California, is failing, so he hires a mercenary, Don Ready. They have 211 cars to sell over the 4th of July weekend. Don's team of Babs, Jibby, and Brent promise him they will make the dealership a profit over the weekend. He also hires a DJ and some strippers from a local strip club to help with the publicity.

On the first day the crowds gather for hot dogs and other gimmicks. Don notices that the naturally talented salesman, Blake, could be his son (he was there once before and had a brief fling). The sales team sells the cars by any means necessary and finish the first day selling 71 cars.

Before they can leave the lot, Stu Harding and his son Paxton from the opposing dealership, Harding Imports, offer to purchase the lot. As Paxton is marrying Ben's daughter, Ivy, he is trying to put his future father-in-law out of business. Paxton only wants practice space for his "man-band", Big Ups, and eventually wants to take them worldwide. Ben almost finalizes a deal with Stu but Don promises to sell every car on the lot.

The second day starts off poorly with a dishonest commercial that Ben is dying of testicular cancer. When it is time for Eric Bice, Bo Bice's brother, to take the stage, he backs out at the last minute after rumors of him contracting adult chicken pox, and Don takes the stage. The crowd riots when they find out Don is an atrocious singer. Taking advantage of all the cameras on the lot from the riot, the team starts a sale for 20% off to the police.

Don is taking stock in his life when Ivy questions him about one of his jobs in Albuquerque. He tells her he unintentionally killed his best friend and team DJ, McDermott, by giving him a bag with sex toys instead of a parachute. Don was more focused on having sex with his customer than selling cars. He then reveals to Ivy that he is falling for her and it is all happening again. That night she comes to Don's hotel room and they have sex.

Ivy reveals that it was a one-night stand and is not breaking up with Paxton. Don is upset and storms out yelling that he only trusts cars after what he's been done by Ivy. The team searches but cannot find Don, they get pumped up to sell the 105 cars left on the lot without him. While wandering the desert near a site of disposed cars, Don sees the deceased McDermott with two angels. McDermott tells him that everything is about the team, people you love, and that he should get off the road and settle down. In the time it takes Don to get back to the dealership the team has sold every car on the lot.

Don parachutes onto the lot but Stu and Paxton inform him the "bandit car" (an expensive prop that was used in the Smokey and the Bandit films) is not sold, so the dealership is theirs. Don pulls Paxton aside to talk about what the Bandit car could do for him in his music aspirations, and immediately convinces Paxton to buy it, which saves the lot, and Paxton leaves Ivy to tour with his band. Don announces that he is going to get off the road and rip up his Hacienda Suites membership card so he can care for his friends and family more. Don marries Ivy and adopts Blake (despite the fact that Blake knows he is not, in fact, his son) but they get divorced two years later. Neither Don nor Ivy wants custody of Blake after the divorce.

== Cast ==
- Jeremy Piven as Don "The Goods" Ready / "Big Boy Donnie"
- Ving Rhames as "Jibby" Newsome
- James Brolin as Ben Selleck
- David Koechner as Brent Gage
- Kathryn Hahn as Babs Merrick
- Ed Helms as Paxton Harding
- Jordana Spiro as Ivy Selleck
- Tony Hale as Wade Zooha
- Ken Jeong as Teddy Dang
- Rob Riggle as Peter Selleck
- Alan Thicke as Stu Harding
- Charles Napier as Dick Lewiston
- Jonathan Sadowski as Blake
- Noureen DeWulf as Heather
- Wendie Malick as Tammy Selleck
- Craig Robinson as D.J. Request (credited as "DeeJay")
- Bryan Callen as Jason, Big Ups!
- Joey Kern as Ricky, Big Ups!
- Matt Walsh as Captain Ortiz
- Ian Roberts as Gary, Selleck Customer
- Kristen Schaal as Stacey, The Stewardess
- Christopher Gartin as Husband, Selleck Customer
- Jessica St. Clair as Wife, Selleck Customer
- Morgan Murphy as Karaoke Bartender
- Gwen Stewart as McDermott Angel
- T. J. Miller as Cessna Jim
- Molly Erdman as Selleck Customer of Zooha
- Paul Lieberstein as Selleck's Last Customer
- Will Ferrell as Craig McDermott (uncredited)
- Gina Gershon (uncredited)
- Bradley Steven Perry as Young Don Ready (uncredited)
- Kulap Vilaysack as Blowout Customer #2 (uncredited)

== Production ==
The film was originally titled, The Goods: The Don Ready Story. Adam McKay acknowledges similarities between this film and the Robert Zemeckis-directed, Steven Spielberg-produced film Used Cars, which he thinks the "regular people have forgotten about", and he compares this film to a funny Glengarry Glen Ross in tone.

== Release ==
=== Theatrical release ===
The film was theatrically released on August 14, 2009 in the United States by Paramount Vantage.

=== Home media ===
The film was released on DVD as a rental only with no special features November 17 and for sale December 15.

== Reception ==
=== Critical response ===
The Goods: Live Hard, Sell Hard received mostly negative reviews from critics. On the review aggregator website Rotten Tomatoes, the film holds a rating of 27%, based on 103 reviews, with an average score of 4.2/10. The site's consensus reads, "Despite the talent in front of and behind the camera, The Goods: Live Hard, Sell Hard largely misfires, proving a squandered opportunity for all involved." On Metacritic, the film has a score of 39 out of 100, based on 23 critics, indicating "generally unfavorable reviews". On a more positive note, notable film critic Roger Ebert of the Chicago Sun-Times gave the film three stars out of four, saying "the screenplay moves at a breakneck pace. If a gag doesn't work, another one is on its heels".

=== Controversy ===
On August 17, the Japanese American Citizens League requested an apology due to a scene depicting the mob beating of an Asian-American man, as well as the usage of the term "Jap" in the movie.

=== Box office ===
The film opened at #6 in 1,838 theaters making $5,642,137 behind District 9, G.I. Joe: The Rise of Cobra, The Time Traveler's Wife, Julie & Julia, and G-Force. The Goods stayed in theaters for seven weeks, only staying in the top 10 for its first two weeks. The film has grossed $15,122,676 domestically and $178,209 abroad for a total of $15,300,885 so far. This has placed it at number 97 for all films released in 2009.
