= The Hotwives =

2014 American sitcom

- The Hotwives of Orlando title card
- Also known as: ...of Orlando (season 1); ...of Las Vegas (season 2)
- Genre: Parody; Satire
- Created by: Dannah Phirman; Danielle Schneider
- Directed by: Alex Fernie
- Starring: Tymberlee Hill; Angela Kinsey; Dannah Phirman; Andrea Savage; Danielle Schneider; Casey Wilson; Kristen Schaal; Erinn Hayes
- Country of origin: United States
- Original language: English
- No. of seasons: 2
- No. of episodes: 14

Production
- Executive producers: Dannah Phirman; Danielle Schneider; Paul Scheer; Jonathan Stern; Charles Browne
- Running time: 23 minutes
- Production companies: Paramount Digital Entertainment; Abominable Pictures; Hulu Originals

Original release
- Network: Hulu
- Release: July 15, 2014 – September 22, 2015

The Hotwives is an American sitcom that premiered on July 15, 2014, on the streaming service Hulu. Developed by Paramount Digital Entertainment as a parody of The Real Housewives reality television franchise broadcast on Bravo, the first season follows the lives of several fictional women residing in Orlando, Florida. The series' seven hotwives are inspired by several housewives that have been featured on installments of The Real Housewives.

Season two, following a new group of ladies in Las Vegas, premiered on August 18, 2015.

== Conception ==
The series was created by Dannah Phirman and Danielle Schneider. Paul Scheer and Jonathan Stern serve as executive producers. It is part of Hulu's initiative to produce original scripted programming. The show is a scripted parody of the reality television franchise The Real Housewives on Bravo. The reality TV parody series depicts the purportedly exclusive and glamorous world of "hot housewives" from different cities each season, following the women as they fight over everything from their love of shoes, plastic surgery, and the pursuit of spending all of their husbands' money.

== Plot ==
The first season (The Hotwives of Orlando) focused on "Orlando Hotwives": Tawny St. John (portrayed by Casey Wilson), Shauna Maducci (Danielle Schneider), Phe Phe Reed (Tymberlee Hill), Veronica Von Vandervon (Andrea Savage), Crystal Simmons (Angela Kinsey), and Amanda Simmons (Kristen Schaal).

The second season (The Hotwives of Las Vegas) focuses on "Vegas Hotwives": Denise Funt (Schneider), Leona Carpeze (Dannah Phirman), Jenfer Beudon (Wilson), Ivanka Silversan (Savage), Callie Silversan (Erinn Hayes), "First Lady" Stephanie (Kinsey), and Hill reprising her role as Phe Phe Reed, now newly relocated to Las Vegas.

== Cast ==
=== Season one – The Hotwives of Orlando (2014) ===
==== Main cast ====
- Andrea Savage as Veronica Von Vandervon: "The Cougar" – A wealthy and classy woman who is known for her vulgar sense of humor and is always on the prowl for younger men. She often insists on explaining her overly suggestive jokes. She speaks in an English accent, although it is later revealed in the reunion that she is in fact not British and only sounds that way because she is white and rich. The sex-obsessed Veronica is an independent businesswoman and the heiress to the "Hot Holes, Heavy Putting" mini-golf fortune.
- Angela Kinsey as Crystal Simmons: "The Religious Zealot" – A devout Christian and local Orlando weather girl. However, she claims to not have actually read the Bible because "it’s written in Jewish." She is known for her "holier than thou" attitude and being judgmental of everyone, especially of her younger sister, Amanda.
- Kristen Schaal as Amanda Simmons: "The Drug Addled Former Child Star" – Crystal's younger sister and a former child star who made her claim to fame as the "Florida Prune Juice girl" in a number of commercials as a child. She claims her substance abuse issues are behind her. She is not technically a wife as she is chronically single, but has hopes that being on the show will help her regain her fame.
- Danielle Schneider as Shauna Maducci: "The Bankrupt Overspender" – The brassy Italian-American hotwife with anger control problems. She is addicted to shopping and is constantly fighting with everyone from her husband, Anthony, to her "best friend" Tawny. She and her husband are on the verge of bankruptcy, which she is single-handedly responsible for because of her overspending habits.
- Tymberlee Hill as Phenomenon "Phe Phe" Reed: "The Entrepreneur" – The flashy African-American hotwife known for "speaking her mind", referring to herself in the third person, and coining catchphrases involving her name, such as "I'm just bein' Phe Phe!". Her "entrepreneurial" pursuits include lawyer, foot model, and aspiring taxidermist, among other careers.
- Casey Wilson as Tawny St. John: "The Trophy Wife" – The self-obsessed, gold-digging trophy hotwife who is cheating on her much older husband, Phil, with her fitness trainer, Heath. She defends her actions by claiming that Phil is dying, when he in fact just has allergies. She seemingly has no real marketable skills other than attending charity events, partying, and making music videos, although she has recently attempted to release her own cosmetic products such as her new line of "eyebrow extensions", and also runs a charity called "Classy Canines", which supplies high heels for dogs.

==== Supporting and recurring cast ====
- Paul Scheer as Matty Green – The show's executive producer who appears in every episode to plug his after-show, "The Hotwives Cooldown".
- Joey McIntyre as Heath – Tawny's fitness trainer with whom she's having an affair while her husband is on his deathbed.
- Stephen Tobolowsky as Phil – Tawny's much older, wealthy husband, who she thinks is dying, or she hopes is dying anyway. He is completely oblivious to the fact that Tawny is having an affair with Heath.
- Matt Besser as Anthony – Shauna's husband. He and Shauna are constantly fighting and both appear to hate each other.
- Jerry Minor as Rodney – Phe Phe's constantly cheating husband. He works as a sports mascot. He and Phe Phe later get divorced after she catches him in bed with another woman.
- Seth Morris as T.J. – Crystal's very controlling husband, who forbids Crystal from most activities because it goes against the Bible, which she has not read because he claims it is in "Jewish".
- Dannah Phirman as Alli – A wannabe hotwife who is often seen hanging around the ladies, usually trying to spread gossip. She isn't a hotwife but likes to tell everyone she could be.
- Sterling Knight as Billy – Veronica's under-aged boyfriend. He is not very smart.
- Jeff Hiller as Antoine Donner – The party planner often hired by the ladies.

Other guest appearances have included "Weird Al" Yankovic, Kate Walsh, Rich Fulcher, Melissa Rauch, Kulap Vilaysack, Lauren Lapkus, and Horatio Sanz.

=== Season two – The Hotwives of Las Vegas (2015) ===
- Casey Wilson as Jenfer Beudon: "The Southern Bitch" – Cocky, southern, white-trash, and very pregnant. Best friends with First Lady until she became pregnant with Ace's baby (something Jenfer doesn't acknowledge happened until First Lady and Ace broke up, although it happened over six months prior). Writer of "The Loneliest Fingertip", a children's book based on her lack of fingertip on her right hand.
- Angela Kinsey as Stephanie: "The First Lady" – A highly tailored, uptight snob. Was married to the former mayor of the Vegas Strip. Creator of the Anorexi-Yeah! "food" line. Former best friends with Jenfer, then enemies, then the adopted mother of Jenfer's baby (who she insists is actually biologically hers).
- Andrea Savage as Ivanka Silversan: "The Ex-Model" – A European former model, she believes she is the standard of beauty and perfection, as is her family. Sister-in-law of Callie. Tries to get her infant daughter Lola into modeling, but is horrified to learn that the baby is "too fat" (as she has not lost her baby fat yet).
- Tymberlee Hill as Phenomenon "Phe Phe" Reed: "The Entrepreneur" – Smart, outspoken, always juggling several jobs. Newly relocated to Las Vegas from Orlando. Introduced to the series as First Lady's college roommate, Phe Phe is a real-life judge (and the host of her own courtroom show, Ya Guilty, Bitch!) and all-around renaissance woman.
- Dannah Phirman as Leona Carpeze: "The Matriarch" – A tough, straight-talking broad. Matriarch of the group and self-appointed peace keeper. Owner of the strip club and buffet "Venus's Mound", Leona has a hard time letting go of her dependent son Junior, who is 30 years old.
- Danielle Schneider as Denise Funt: "The Divorcée" – Neurotic, needy, and recently divorced. A new housewife in the "Las Vegas" cast, Denise is introduced as Leona's neighbor. Easily guilted into situations, her bipolar rages come out at various times, such as when Phe Phe steals a chair from her (twice).
- Erinn Hayes as Callie Silversan: "The Wiccan" – A sensuous, mysterious, raven-haired witch and wiccan. Her brother Vance is married to Ivanka, and the two women have a relationship fraught with anger, due to Callie's deep embrace of witchcraft (and her implied sexual relationship with Vance) and Ivanka's overall lack of empathy for other people besides herself. In the reunion, it is revealed that she has a husband named Tim, who was present for the entire season but edited out for being too uninteresting.

==== Supporting and recurring cast ====
- Paul Scheer as Matty Green and Vance Silversan – Matty is the show's executive producer who appears in every episode to plug his after-show, "The Hotwives Cooldown". Vance is Ivanka's magician husband who has an oddly close relationship with his sister Callie.
- Keegan-Michael Key as Ace – The fame hungry husband of Jenfer. Was in a relationship with Stephanie but dumped her for Jenfer.
- LaMonica Garrett as Adonis – Phe Phe's con man husband.
- Matt Besser as Kelly – Denise's boyfriend who was a popular impressionist in the '90s known for his 873 voices.
- Jon Gabrus as Junior – Leona's adult son who is entirely dependent on her.

==== Hotwives of Orlando appearances ====
- Angela Kinsey as Crystal Simmons – The devout Christian Hotwife of Orlando. She appears during "The Hotwives Cooldown" to discuss Jenfer's pregnancy.
- Jeff Hiller as Antoine Donner – The party planner from Orlando who flies to Las Vegas to plan a party for Ivanka.
- Kristen Schaal as Amanda Simmons – Now 760 days sober, Amanda is supposed to deliver a speech at the AA convention but falls off the wagon when she reconnects with Phe-Phe and unwillingly drinks vodka.
- Danielle Schneider as Shauna Maducci – She appears during "The Hotwives Cooldown", where she immediately starts rambling on violence.

Other guest appearances included "Weird Al" Yankovic, Thomas Lennon, Jackie Siegel, Rob Huebel, June Diane Raphael, Ian Roberts, Dan Bucatinsky, Seth Morris, and Lisa Rinna.

== Real Housewives counterparts ==
The entire cast represent members of the Real Housewives series.

Season one

- Tawny St. John (Casey Wilson) is largely based on a mash-up of The Real Housewives of Orange County's Tamra Barney and Gretchen Rossi.
- Shauna Maducci (Danielle Schneider) is largely based on The Real Housewives of New Jersey's Teresa Giudice.
- Phenomenon "Phe Phe" Reed (Tymberlee Hill) is largely based on a mash-up of The Real Housewives of Atlanta's NeNe Leakes and Phaedra Parks.
- Veronica Von Vandervon (Andrea Savage) is largely based on a mash-up of The Real Housewives of Beverly Hills' Lisa Vanderpump and The Real Housewives of New York City's Sonja Morgan.
- Crystal Simmons (Angela Kinsey) is largely based on a mash-up of The Real Housewives of Orange County's Alexis Bellino and The Real Housewives of Beverly Hills' Kyle Richards.
- Amanda Simmons (Kristen Schaal) is largely based on The Real Housewives of Beverly Hills' Kim Richards.

Co-creator Dannah Phirman also recurs as Alli, based on "friend of the Real Housewives" Dana Wilkey from The Real Housewives of Beverly Hills.

Season two

- "First Lady" Stephanie (Angela Kinsey) is largely based on The Real Housewives of New York City's LuAnn de Lesseps.
- Leona Carpeze (Dannah Phirman) is largely based on The Real Housewives of New Jersey's Caroline Manzo.
- Phenomenon "Phe Phe" Reed (Tymberlee Hill) is largely based on a mash-up of The Real Housewives of Atlanta's NeNe Leakes and Phaedra Parks.
- Ivanka Silversan (Andrea Savage) is largely based on The Real Housewives of Beverly Hills' Yolanda Foster with storyline parallels to The Real Housewives of New Jersey's Melissa Gorga.
- Callie Silversan (Erinn Hayes) is largely based on The Real Housewives of Beverly Hills' Carlton Gebbia with storyline parallels to The Real Housewives of New Jersey's Teresa Giudice.
- Denise Funt (Danielle Schneider) is largely based on a mash-up of The Real Housewives of Orange County's Shannon Beador and The Real Housewives of Beverly Hills' Taylor Armstrong.
- Jenfer Beudon (Casey Wilson) is largely based on The Real Housewives of Atlanta's Kim Zolciak.

In addition, secondary character Ace (Keegan-Michael Key) is based on The Real Housewives of Orange County's Slade Smiley, who also romanced two housewives.

== Episodes ==
| Season | Title | Episodes | Originally released | |
| Season | Title | Episodes | First released | Last released |
|---|---|---|---|---|
| 1 | The Hotwives of Orlando | 7 | July 15, 2014 | |
| 2 | The Hotwives of Las Vegas | 7 | August 18, 2015 | September 22, 2015 |

=== Season 1 (2014) ===
| No. overall | No. in season | Title | Directed by | Written by | Original release date | Prod. code |
|---|---|---|---|---|---|---|
| 1 | 1 | "Meet the Hotwives" | Alex Fernie | Dannah Phirman & Danielle Schneider | July 15, 2014 | 101 |
| 2 | 2 | "Pimps and Hoo-Ha's" | Alex Fernie | Dannah Phirman & Danielle Schneider | July 15, 2014 | 102 |
| 3 | 3 | "Say You, Séance" | Alex Fernie | Dannah Phirman & Danielle Schneider | July 15, 2014 | 103 |
| 4 | 4 | "Intervention Party" | Alex Fernie | Dannah Phirman & Danielle Schneider | July 15, 2014 | 104 |
| 5 | 5 | "Staycation" | Alex Fernie | Dannah Phirman & Danielle Schneider | July 15, 2014 | 105 |
| 6 | 6 | "Vow Renewals" | Alex Fernie | Dannah Phirman & Danielle Schneider | July 15, 2014 | 106 |
| 7 | 7 | "The Reunion" | Alex Fernie | Dannah Phirman & Danielle Schneider | July 15, 2014 | 107 |

=== Season 2 (2015) ===
On January 7, 2015, Hulu announced The Hotwives will have a second season, following a new group of ladies in Las Vegas. The new season premiered on August 18, 2015.

| No. overall | No. in season | Title | Directed by | Written by | Original release date | Prod. code |
|---|---|---|---|---|---|---|
| 8 | 1 | "What Happens in Vegas... Seriously, What Happens There?" | Alex Fernie | Dannah Phirman & Danielle Schneider | August 18, 2015 | 201 |
| 9 | 2 | "You Make Me Wanna Drought" | Alex Fernie | Dannah Phirman & Danielle Schneider | August 18, 2015 | 202 |
| 10 | 3 | "The Leona, the Witch, and the Whore-Drobe" | Alex Fernie | Dannah Phirman & Danielle Schneider | August 25, 2015 | 203 |
| 11 | 4 | "Old Friends, New Enemies" | Alex Fernie | Dannah Phirman & Danielle Schneider | September 1, 2015 | 204 |
| 12 | 5 | "Vaca-Shunned" | Alex Fernie | Dannah Phirman & Danielle Schneider | September 8, 2015 | 205 |
| 13 | 6 | "Labor of Love" | Alex Fernie | Dannah Phirman & Danielle Schneider | September 15, 2015 | 206 |
| 14 | 7 | "The Reunion" | Alex Fernie | Dannah Phirman & Danielle Schneider | September 22, 2015 | 207 |

== Broadcast ==
Season 1 (The Hotwives of Orlando) was released in its entirety on July 15, 2014, on Hulu. The Pop channel began airing season 1 on television in January 2015. Season 1 was made available on Netflix in the UK and Ireland on September 12, 2015.

Season 2's (The Hotwives of Las Vegas) episodes released weekly, beginning August 18, 2015.

In France, the series is broadcast on Canal+ Séries.

== Home media ==
Season one (The Hotwives of Orlando) was released on DVD on May 12, 2015. The DVD release contains all 7 episodes of its first season.
