= Tymberlee Hill =

American actress and comedian

Tymberlee Hill is an American actress and comedian. She played for roles on comedy programs such as Marry Me, Drunk History, The Hotwives, Search Party and Perfect Harmony.

== Career ==
Hill grew up in Virginia Beach, Virginia. In 2003, she received her graduate degree from the Shakespeare Theatre's Academy for Classical Acting at George Washington University. A classically trained stage actor, Hill started performing in comedy after moving to Los Angeles and beginning to perform at the Upright Citizens Brigade Theatre.

She continues to perform at the UCB Theatre. In 2014, Hill began playing the role of Phe Phe Reed in the Hulu sitcom The Hotwives. In 2014, Hill was cast in the NBC comedy series Marry Me as a series regular, playing the role of Kay until the series' cancellation after one season. She has a recurring role as Detective Joy on season two of the TBS mystery-comedy Search Party.

== Filmography ==
=== Film ===
Year	Title	Role	Notes
2010	Due Date	New Mother	
2012	The Campaign	African American Woman	Uncredited
2016	Donald Trump's The Art of the Deal: The Movie	Judge	

=== Television ===
Year	Title	Role	Notes
2006–09	Numbers	FBI Tech / Junior Agent	3 episodes
2007	Drunk History	Oney Judge	Episode: "Drunk History Vol. 3: Featuring Danny McBride"; web series
2007	CSI: Crime Scene Investigation	Heidi Sultz	Episode: "Meet Market"
2007–09	Grey's Anatomy	Intern Claire	16 episodes
2008	12 Miles of Bad Road	Nurse Jackson	Episode: "Texas Stadium"
2008–09	Brothers & Sisters	Female Staffer / Vanessa	3 episodes
2010	The Guild	Jeanette	4 episodes; web series
2011	Castle	Julie Taylor	Episode: "Nikki Heat"
2011	Curb Your Enthusiasm	Karen	Episode: "The Safe House"
2012	Up All Night	Nancy	Episode: "Ma'am'd"
2012–13	Comedy Bang! Bang!	Shelly Cramden / Reggie's Wife	2 episodes
2013–18	Drunk History	Herself / Various	17 episodes
2014	The Hotwives of Orlando	Phe Phe Reed	7 episodes
2014–15	Marry Me	Kay	18 episodes
2015	The Hotwives of Las Vegas	Phe Phe Reed	7 episodes
2016	Bob's Burgers	Ms. Twitchell (voice)	Episode: "The Gene and Courtney Show"
2016	Broad City	Mona	2 episodes
2017	Son of Zorn	Diane	Episode: "The Quest for Craig"
2017	Search Party	Joy	5 episodes
2018	LA to Vegas	Annette	Episode: "The Fellowship of the Bear"
2019–20	Perfect Harmony	Adams	13 episodes
