= Respecto Montalban =

Comedy troupe in New York from 1998 to 2005

- Respecto Montalban (l to r): Chad Carter, Danielle Schneider, Rob Riggle, Paul Scheer, Jackie Clarke, Rob Huebel, Owen Burke and Dannah Feinglass.
- Formation: 1999
- Dissolved: September 2005
- Type: Theatre group
- Location: Chelsea, Manhattan, New York

Respecto Montalban was an improvisational and sketch comedy troupe associated with the Upright Citizens Brigade Theatre in New York City from 1999 until September 2005.

The name of the group is an homage to the actor Ricardo Montalbán.

== Performances ==
The team performed weekly on Saturdays. They used the longform improvisation structure the "Harold" but later chose the "Evente" as its signature form.

The troupe performed "Good vs. Elvis," a series of long-form sketches, and the show was listed in The Village Voice's "The Best of NYC" in 2004. They also produced four sketch comedy shows: "Burn Millionaire Burn", "Doin' Blow with George W.", "When Amish Attack", and "George Bush Is a MotherFucker", which was conceived and guest-directed by Adam McKay.

The troupe's connection to the UCB led to scouts from the Late Show With David Letterman and Comedy Central attending shows in search of new talent.

== Break-Up ==
Through their years of existence, the group slowly dissolved as more members moved to Los Angeles to pursue their actor/comedian careers. Many started TV shows, but mostly could be seen on various VH1 commentary shows. The first two to leave were Danielle Schneider and Dannah Feinglass. For about a year, the group performed without them and with Jack McBrayer. Rob Riggle was hired as a featured player for the NBC sketch show Saturday Night Live in 2004 and could only perform with Respecto when SNL wasn't taping any new episodes. Eventually, Owen Burke went to Los Angeles, and Scheer and Huebel soon followed. The group often called in improvisers Amy Rhodes and Chris Gethard to fill in. Eventually, it was impossible to continue the performances and they were forced to dissolve.

== Members ==
The original members of the group included Paul Scheer, Chad Carter, Danielle Schneider, Dannah Feinglass, Jackie Clarke, Owen Burke, Rob Huebel and Rob Riggle. The group's popularity at the UCBT was a springboard to comedy careers for its members:

Rob Riggle, a Marine who served in Liberia, Kosovo and Afghanistan, has been a cast member on Saturday Night Live and a correspondent on The Daily Show. He has made guest appearances on numerous comedy programs such as Human Giant, Arrested Development and The Office. Since 2012, Riggle has been a featured commentator on Fox NFL Sunday.

Rob Huebel has made memorable guest spots on shows such as 30 Rock, Curb Your Enthusiasm, The Office, Happy Endings, The League, and Arrested Development, and was a producer for Michael Moore's The Awful Truth. He played the Inconsiderate Cell Phone Man in cinema ads for Cingular Wireless. Huebel became a core member of MTV's Human Giant along with Scheer and Aziz Ansari. He currently stars in the Adult Swim series Childrens Hospital.

Paul Scheer appeared weekly on VH1's Best Week Ever, and can be seen in School for Scoundrels and was a guest on the Jeff Goldblum TV drama Raines. He starred with Respecto castmate Rob Huebel on Human Giant, a sketch comedy series on MTV and was one of the stars of the FX comedy The League. In 2011 he created the Adult Swim series "NTSF:SD:SUV::" which he starred in with Respecto member Rob Riggle. Scheer also hosts the popular podcast How Did This Get Made? on the Earwolf network.

Dannah Feinglass was a cast member on MADtv in 2000-2001 and had a popular celebrity interview segment on TBS's "Burly TV" called Movie Junky, in which she frequently conducted interviews in costume. Feinglass does voice-over work on several cartoon shows, such as voicing the titular character on the PBS series WordGirl. She also wrote and co-starred in Amy Poehler's animated series The Mighty B! on Nickelodeon.

Owen Burke is a writer and producer for HBO's Funny or Die Presents and is also recognizable for his appearance as the "Dancing Office Guy" in a series of Nextel commercials, and has also appeared in many programs on Comedy Central and VH1. He also wrote the book The UCB Theater's Guide to Improvisation.

Jackie Clarke co-starred in the Nick at Nite animated series Glenn Martin, DDS and was a frequent co-host on several radio shows on K-ROCK 92.3 WFNY-FM, as well as appearing as a regular commentator on several VH1 commentary programs. She has written for television programs such as Happy Endings, Undateable, The Big Gay Sketch Show, and Free Radio.

Chad Carter is a television writer who has written for the animated CBS show Creature Comforts America and the ABC reality show My Kind of Town and is a producer for The Daily Show.

Danielle Schneider has made appearances on Best Week Ever, MTV's Beach House, and UPN's Love Inc., and co-starred with UCBT founders Matt Walsh and Ian Roberts in the improvised comedy series Players on Spike TV.

Clarke, Feinglass, and Schneider were on the writing staff of the NBC sitcom Marry Me.

In 2014, Danielle Schneider and Dannah Feinglass created the Hulu original series The Hotwives of Orlando, which is executive produced by Paul Scheer.

Rob Huebel and Paul Scheer's long-running live stand-up show "Crash Test", is becoming a series for Comedy Central in late 2014.

== Post-Respecto ==
In October 2006, many of the remaining members of the group relocated to Los Angeles and started performing at the West Coast Upright Citizens Brigade Theatre in "MySpace", an improv comedy show based on audience members' MySpace profiles. The show has been featured on Good Morning America and was voted the Best Improv in LA by Los Angeles Magazine.

Many of the members continued to perform together at the UCB Theater in NYC.

Paul Scheer and Rob Huebel appeared along with Aziz Ansari on MTV's Human Giant. Most of the other Respecto members also made guest appearances on the show.

Most of the members reunited for a show in summer 2008's Del Close marathon show at the East Coast Upright Citizens Brigade Theatre.

On Friday August 14, 2009 during the 11th Annual Del Close Marathon, Owen Burke, Chad Carter, Jackie Clarke, Rob Huebel, Rob Riggle & Paul Scheer reunited once again as Respecto Montalban for one show only at FIT in New York City.
