= Dannah Phirman =

American actress (born 1975)

- Born: Dannah Feinglass; April 22, 1975 (age 51)
- Citizenship: Jewish American
- Education: SUNY Geneseo
- Occupations: Actress; comedian; writer
- Years active: 1998–present
- Known for: WordGirl

Dannah Phirman (née Feinglass) (born April 22, 1975) is an American actress, comedian and writer who is best known for voicing Becky Botsford/the titular superheroine, on the PBS Kids animated TV series WordGirl and Penny on the Nickelodeon animated TV series The Mighty B!, and for co-starring as Narge Hemingway in the Adult Swim series Newsreaders. She is also the co-creator and co-star of the Hulu reality TV parody series The Hotwives. She was a member of the long-running sketch comedy troupe Respecto Montalban, one of the original improv groups at the Upright Citizens Brigade Theatre.

== Biography ==
Phirman majored in theater at SUNY Geneseo and graduated in 1997. After moving to New York City in 1998 she became involved with the Upright Citizens Brigade Theater where she was a part of the improv sketch group Respecto Montalban. Phirman teaches sketch comedy writing and improv, and has performed in two-person shows like Eye Candy (with Danielle Schneider), which went to the 2002 U.S. Comedy Arts Festival in Aspen, and Special Delivery (with Paul Scheer), a parody of a British children's show in which postal workers rummage through people's mail in search of heartwarming lessons and edibles. She and Scheer won a 2004 Nightlife Award for Automatic Vaudeville, called "the best variety show in New York City" by Time Out New York. She has since collaborated with creative partner Danielle Schneider on other sketch shows such as Let's Get Awkward and Dead Heiresses at the Los Angeles UCB, as well as a five-woman improv show Mother F#$@er. Dead Heiresses was also developed as a pilot for Comedy Central in 2007.

== Acting ==
Dannah Phirman was a cast member on Fox’s MADtv from 2000-2001, where she notably portrayed Angelina Jolie, Debi Mazar, Liza Minnelli and Shirley Temple. Phirman provided the voice of the title character as well as her alter ego, Becky Botsford, in the PBS Kids animated series, WordGirl, Penny, the side-kick to Amy Poehler's Bessie Higgenbottom in Nickelodeon's The Mighty B!, and Zaria on the Nickelodeon original series, Tak and the Power of Juju. She was a contributing voice to Current TV's SuperNews! show and has recently provided voices for the video game Mass Effect as well as White Knight Chronicles: International Edition.

== Writing ==
Phirman has written episodes of WordGirl and The Mighty B!, and the direct-to-video sequel to Beverly Hills Chihuahua with her writing partner Danielle Schneider. Phirman and Schneider are currently working on scripts for the upcoming movies Catfight for New Line Cinema and Boys Are Stupid, Throw Rocks at Them for Universal.

Phirman and Schneider created the Hulu reality TV parody series The Hotwives and were writers on the NBC sitcoms Marry Me and Telenovela. In 2017, Phirman and Schneider worked as writers and producers on It's Always Sunny in Philadelphia as well as on the TruTV sitcom I'm Sorry.

== Filmography ==
- The Fairly OddParents - Missy
- Kung Fu Panda: Legends of Awesomeness - Xiao Niao
- The Mighty B! - Penny
- My Gym Partner's a Monkey - Possum Girl
- Phineas and Ferb - Teenage Milly ("Act Your Age")
- Tak and the Power of Juju - Zaria, Repugnant Juju, Sheep Linda, Dragon Head, Various voices
- Tak and the Guardians of Gross - Zaria
- Mass Effect - Avina
- WordGirl - WordGirl/Becky Botsford, Claire McCallister, Chuck the Evil Sandwich Making Guy's Mother, Edith Von Housenhous, Pretty Princess, Female Police Officers
- O'Grady - Ruby Stefani/Misty LeClaire ("Cut the Cord")
- MADtv - various characters (credited as Dannah Feinglass)
- White Knight Chronicles - Yulie
- White Knight Chronicles II - Yulie
- Talking Tom & Friends - Ben's Mom, Mother, Moon
- Childrens Hospital (TV series) - Appalled Mom
- Newsreaders (TV series) - Narge Hemingway
- My Life - Additional Voices
