= Danielle Schneider =

American actress (born 1975)

- Born: January 1, 1975 (age 51); Atlanta, Georgia, U.S.
- Occupations: Actress; comedian; writer; podcaster
- Years active: 1998–present
- Spouse: Matt Besser (m. 2008)
- Children: 1

Danielle Caroline Schneider (born January 1, 1975) is an American actress, writer, and improvisational comedian from the Upright Citizens Brigade Theatre. She co-created and starred in the Hulu reality TV parody series The Hotwives and currently co-hosts (alongside Casey Wilson) the podcast Bitch Sesh.

== Life and career ==
Schneider was raised in Atlanta, Georgia, before moving to Boca Raton, Florida, at age 13. She graduated in 1993 from Spanish River Community High School. She is a graduate of New York University's Tisch School of the Arts.

Schneider appeared regularly as a panelist on Best Week Ever and various other VH1 commentary programs. She has played a Paris Hilton-like debutante on Fox's My Big Fat Obnoxious Boss, she starred in Trio's The Pop Culture Round-Up: White Noise, Comedy Central's Contest Searchlight with Denis Leary, was a cast member of VH1's prank show Sledgehammer, guest-starred on NBC's Happy Family and Comedy Central's Crossballs. Schneider has appeared on Late Night with Conan O'Brien and voiced various characters on MTV's Celebrity Deathmatch and the PBS Kids GO! series WordGirl. She also co-starred as Krista in the Spike TV improvised comedy series Players in 2010.

Schneider is a graduate of New York University's Tisch School of the Arts. She has been a performer and teacher at the Upright Citizens Brigade Theatre (UCB) in New York City and Los Angeles, where she was a member of one of UCB's original improvisational comedy troupes, Respecto Montalban. In 2002, Schneider's two-woman sketch show Eye Candy, which she wrote and starred in with her creative partner Dannah Phirman, was selected for HBO's U.S. Comedy Arts Festival in Aspen, Colorado. She has since collaborated with Phirman on other sketch shows such as Let's Get Awkward and Dead Heiresses at the Los Angeles UCB. Dead Heiresses was also developed as a pilot for Comedy Central in 2007.

Schneider and Phirman wrote the screenplay for Beverly Hills Chihuahua 2 and are currently working on scripts for the upcoming movies Catfight for New Line Cinema and Boys Are Stupid, Throw Rocks at Them for Universal.

Schneider and Phirman created and starred in the Hulu reality TV parody series The Hotwives and wrote on the NBC sitcoms Marry Me and Telenovela. Schneider also had a recurring role on Marry Me, playing the role of Cassie. In 2017, Schneider and Phirman worked as writers and producers on It's Always Sunny in Philadelphia and on the TruTV sitcom I'm Sorry. Schneider also wrote on season three of the USA Network comedy Playing House.

=== Podcasting ===
On December 2, 2015, Schneider and Casey Wilson began hosting the Earwolf podcast Bitch Sesh, where they and a guest have comedic discussions about the previous night's episode of The Real Housewives, as well as other topics related to the Bravo channel. Guests have included June Diane Raphael, Andy Cohen, Adam Pally, Jerry O'Connell, Matt Besser, Vanessa Bayer, Michael Rapaport, Elisha Cuthbert, and Retta. Paul Scheer first announced the show on his podcast How Did This Get Made? and released a special preview episode, describing it as a "sister podcast" to his show, with a focus on discussing reality television instead of movies. Entertainment websites including Vulture, Entertainment Weekly and The A.V. Club ranked Bitch Sesh among the best comedy podcasts of 2016.

== Personal life ==
Schneider lives in Los Angeles and is married to comedian Matt Besser. Their daughter Sydney Diana Besser was born on July 28, 2013.
