= List of Happy Endings episodes =

Happy Endings is an American television sitcom broadcast on ABC. Starring Eliza Coupe, Elisha Cuthbert, Zachary Knighton, Adam Pally, Damon Wayans, Jr., and Casey Wilson, the single-camera ensemble comedy revolves around the lives of a group of friends whose group is rocked when the couple that brought them together, Alex and Dave, break up. This leaves the rest of the group—Max, Brad, Jane, and Penny—in an awkward position of either trying to stay together as friends or having to choose sides.

The series ran on ABC from April 13, 2011, to May 3, 2013. Additionally, a series of six webisodes, titled Happy Rides and sponsored by Subaru, aired on ABC.com during the second season. A total of 58 episodes of Happy Endings aired across three seasons.

== Series overview ==
Season	Episodes	Originally released	
Season	Episodes	First released	Last released
1	13	April 13, 2011	August 24, 2011
2	21	September 28, 2011	April 4, 2012
3	23	October 23, 2012	May 3, 2013

== Episodes ==
=== Season 1 (2011) ===
No. overall	No. in season	Title	Directed by	Written by	Original release date	Prod. code	US viewers (millions)
1	1	"Pilot"	Anthony Russo & Joe Russo	David Caspe	April 13, 2011	HE101	7.30
2	2	"The Quicksand Girlfriend"	Jeff Melman	Josh Bycel	April 13, 2011	HE105	5.70
3	3	"Your Couples Friends & Neighbors"	Fred Savage	Josh Bycel	April 20, 2011	HE109	4.59
4	4	"Mein Coming Out"	Jeff Melman	Gail Lerner	April 20, 2011	HE108	3.86
5	5	"Like Father, Like Gun"	Tristram Shapeero	Daniel Libman & Matthew Libman	April 27, 2011	HE112	5.17
6	6	"Of Mice & Jazz-Kwon-Do"	Troy Miller	Rob Kerkovich & Todd Waldman	May 4, 2011	HE107	3.88
7	7	"Dave of the Dead"	Randall Einhorn	Leila Strachan	May 4, 2011	HE104	3.26
8	8	"The Girl with the David Tattoo"	Jay Chandrasekhar	Prentice Penny	May 11, 2011	HE111	4.18
9	9	"You've Got Male"	Matt Shakman	Leila Strachan	May 11, 2011	HE110	3.46
10	10	"Bo Fight"	Joe Russo	David Caspe	May 18, 2011	HE102	3.70
11	11	"Barefoot Pedaler"	Anthony Russo	Gail Lerner	May 18, 2011	HE103	3.10
12	12	"The Shershow Redemption"	Lee Shallat-Chemel	Todd Linden, Sierra Teller Ornelas, Steve Basilone & Annie Mebane	May 25, 2011	HE113	4.02
13	13	"Why Can't You Read Me?"	Lee Shallat-Chemel	Prentice Penny	August 24, 2011	HE106	2.98

=== Season 2 (2011–12) ===
No. overall	No. in season	Title	Directed by	Written by	Original release date	Prod. code	US viewers (millions)
14	1	"Blax, Snake, Home"	Anthony Russo	Josh Bycel	September 28, 2011	201	7.25
15	2	"Baby Steps"	Tristram Shapeero	Gail Lerner	October 5, 2011	202	6.70
16	3	"Yesandwitch"	Joe Russo	Leila Strachan	October 12, 2011	203	7.29
17	4	"Secrets and Limos"	Anthony Russo	Hilary Winston	October 19, 2011	204	6.81
18	5	"Spooky Endings"	Fred Savage	Daniel Libman & Matthew Libman	October 26, 2011	205	8.33
19	6	"Lying Around"	Fred Savage	Prentice Penny	November 2, 2011	206	7.62
20	7	"The Code War"	Rob Greenberg	Josh Bycel	November 16, 2011	208	6.94
21	8	"Full Court Dress"	Victor Nelli, Jr.	Sierra Teller Ornelas	November 23, 2011	207	7.11
22	9	"Grinches Be Crazy"	Jeff Melman	Hilary Winston	December 7, 2011	209	6.38
23	10	"The Shrink, The Dare, Her Date and Her Brother"	Jeff Melman	Gail Lerner	January 4, 2012	211	7.48
24	11	"Meat The Parrots" "Meet The Parrots"	Jay Chandrasekhar	Prentice Penny	January 11, 2012	214	6.68
25	12	"Makin' Changes!"	Michael Patrick Jann	Gil Ozeri & Jackie Clarke	January 18, 2012	212	6.05
26	13	"The St. Valentine's Day Maxssacre"	Joe Russo	Matthew Libman & Daniel Libman	February 8, 2012	213	6.70
27	14	"Everybody Loves Grant"	Kyle Newacheck	Leila Strachan	February 15, 2012	215	5.44
28	15	"The Butterfly Effect Effect" "Spring Smackdown"	Victor Nelli, Jr.	Jonathan Groff & Sierra Teller Ornelas	February 22, 2012	216	5.45
29	16	"Cocktails & Dreams"	Rob Greenberg	David Caspe, Matthew Libman & Daniel Libman	February 29, 2012	217	5.94
30	17	"The Kerkovich Way"	Steven Sprung	Todd Linden	March 7, 2012	218	4.49
31	18	"Party of Six"	Fred Goss	Lon Zimmet & Dan Rubin	March 14, 2012	219	5.27
32	19	"You Snooze, You Bruise"	Jay Chandrasekhar	Leila Strachan	March 21, 2012	210	4.10
33	20	"Big White Lies"	Gail Mancuso	Gail Lerner	March 28, 2012	220	4.13
34	21	"Four Weddings and a Funeral (Minus Three Weddings and One Funeral)"	Rob Greenberg	Leila Strachan & Josh Bycel	April 4, 2012	222	3.67

=== Season 3 (2012–13) ===
No. overall	No. in season	Title	Directed by	Written by	Original release date	Prod. code	US viewers (millions)
35	1	"Cazsh Dummy Spillionaires"	Fred Goss	David Caspe, Matthew Libman & Daniel Libman	October 21, 2012 (Canada); October 23, 2012 (US)	301	5.57
36	2	"Sabado Free-Gante"	Stuart McDonald	Josh Bycel & Jonathan Fener	October 28, 2012 (Canada); October 30, 2012 (US)	302	4.31
37	3	"Boys II Menorah"	Eric Appel	Dan Rubin & Lon Zimmet	November 11, 2012 (Canada); November 13, 2012 (US)	303	4.36
38	4	"More Like Stanksgiving"	Jay Chandrasekhar	Leila Strachan	November 18, 2012 (Canada); November 20, 2012 (US)	304	4.38
39	5	"P&P Romance Factory"	Beth McCarthy-Miller	Erik Sommers	December 3, 2012 (Canada); December 4, 2012 (US)	305	3.37
40	6	"To Serb with Love"	Victor Nelli Jr.	Jonathan Groff & Brian Gallivan	December 10, 2012 (Canada); December 11, 2012 (US)	306	3.22
41	7	"No-Ho-Ho"	Michael Patrick Jann	Prentice Penny	December 17, 2012 (Canada); December 18, 2012 (US)	307	3.16
42	8	"Fowl Play/Date"	Rob Greenberg	Sierra Teller Ornelas	January 6, 2013	309	2.40
43	9	"Ordinary Extraordinary Love"	Michael Price	Daniel Chun	January 8, 2013	308	3.66
44	10	"KickBall 2: The Kickening"	Gail Lerner	Jackie Clarke & Gil Ozeri	May 17, 2012 (UK); January 13, 2013 (US)	221	2.07
45	11	"The Ex Factor"	Fred Goss	Leila Strachan	January 14, 2013 (Canada); January 15, 2013 (US)	310	3.05
46	12	"The Marry Prankster"	Rebecca Asher	Jackie Clarke & Gil Ozeri	January 28, 2013 (Canada); January 29, 2013 (US)	311	2.92
47	13	"Our Best Friend's Wedding"	Rob Greenberg	Hilary Winston	January 29, 2013	312	2.85
48	14	"In the Heat of the Noche"	Josh Bycel	Matthew Libman & Daniel Libman	March 29, 2013	313	2.97
49	15	"The Straight Dope"	Steven Sprung	Lon Zimmet & Dan Rubin	March 29, 2013	315	2.29
50	16	"The Incident"	Ken Whittingham	Erik Sommers	April 5, 2013	314	3.28
51	17	"Bros Before Bros"	Eric Appel	Jason Berger	April 5, 2013	316	2.69
52	18	"She Got Game Night"	Kyle Newacheck	Brian Gallivan	April 12, 2013	317	2.73
53	19	"The Storm Before the Calm"	Kyle Newacheck	Prentice Penny	April 12, 2013	318	2.08
54	20	"The Ballad of Lon Sarofsky"	Fred Goss	Jackie Clarke & Gil Ozeri	April 19, 2013 (Canada); April 26, 2013 (US)	319	2.19
55	21	"Un-sabotagable"	Tristram Shapeero	Jonathan Fener	April 26, 2013	320	1.73
56	22	"Deuce Babylove 2: Electric Babydeuce"	David Caspe	Matthew Libman & Daniel Libman	May 3, 2013	321	2.68
57	23	"Brothas & Sisters"	Rebecca Asher	Josh Bycel & Leila Strachan	May 3, 2013	322	2.17

== See also ==
- Happy Endings: Happy Rides
