= Casey Wilson =

American actress and comedian (born 1980)

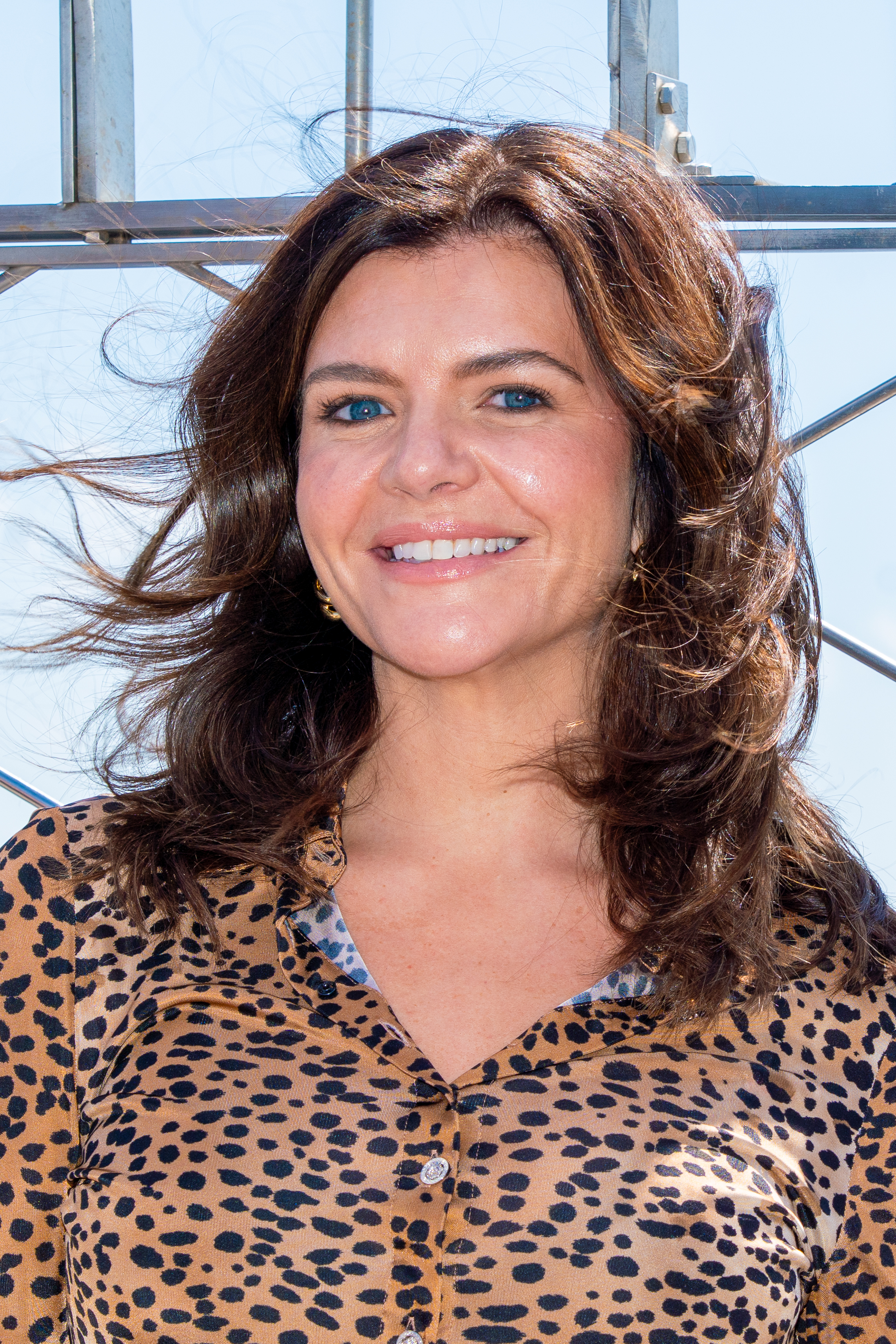
- Wilson at the Empire State Building 2026
- Born: Cathryn Rose Wilson; October 24, 1980 (age 46); Alexandria, Virginia, U.S.
- Education: New York University; Stella Adler Studio of Acting
- Occupations: Actress; comedian; writer; podcaster
- Years active: 2002–present
- Known for: Happy Endings; Saturday Night Live; Black Monday; The Shrink Next Door
- Spouse: David Caspe (m. 2014)
- Children: 3

Cathryn Rose "Casey" Wilson (born October 24, 1980) is an American actress, comedian, and screenwriter. Originally known for her performances with the Upright Citizens Brigade comedy troupe in New York City, Wilson's first major television appearances came during her two-season stint as a cast member on the NBC sketch comedy series Saturday Night Live from 2008 to 2009.

Following SNL, Wilson starred as Penny Hartz in the ABC comedy series Happy Endings for which she was twice nominated for the Critics' Choice Television Award for Best Supporting Actress in a Comedy Series, and has since starred in comedies such as Showtime's Black Monday, Apple TV+'s The Shrink Next Door, Hulu's The Hotwives and Marry Me on NBC.

Other notable work includes supporting roles in films such as Gone Girl, Julie & Julia, and The Meddler, recurring in the HBO series Mrs. Fletcher, the Amazon comedy One Mississippi, and the Netflix series Atypical, and her 2013 Sundance film Ass Backwards, which she co-wrote and starred in with her creative partner June Diane Raphael. Wilson co-hosts (alongside Danielle Schneider) the Earwolf podcast Bitch Sesh.

== Early life and background ==
Casey Wilson was born and raised in Alexandria, Virginia. She graduated from T. C. Williams High School in 1998 and studied theater at New York University's Tisch School of the Arts and at the Stella Adler Studio of Acting where she was a recipient of NYU's "Excellence in Acting" award when graduating in 2002.

She is of Irish and Italian heritage, and was raised Baptist. Her parents worked in politics, and she credits her politically opposed parents (her mother was a Democrat, her father a Republican) in shaping her sense of humor, having grown up in a "blue-state/red-state, forever-clashing political household", as she called it in an interview with Washington Flyer. She has a younger brother, Fletcher.

Her father, Paul O. Wilson, is a political strategist and consultant who runs campaigns for Republican party candidates. Her mother, Kathy Higdon, was a women's rights advocate and served as the chairwoman of the National Women's Political Caucus (NWPC) throughout the 1980s. Under Higdon's leadership, the NWPC endorsed Walter Mondale in the 1984 presidential election.

Kathy Higdon Wilson retired from politics in the late 1980s; switching to a career in early childhood education, she began serving as the director of childcare and development centers in Alexandria, Virginia, in 1991. She died of heart failure at age 54 in Rehoboth Beach, Delaware, on September 1, 2005. Casey Wilson and her family have since continued to run the Kathy Wilson Foundation, a charitable organization honoring her mother's work in helping children with disabilities.

Wilson's passion for performing began at an early age, and she has said that her first memorable exposure to theater came when her father took her to New York City to see a production of Cats, inspiring her to create her own plays.

When Wilson was nine years old, her father built her a homemade stage in the family's backyard, where she put on plays with other children from the neighborhood. From there, she started taking singing and acting lessons as a teenager. She became involved in her high school's theater program, starring in (and occasionally directing) many of the school's plays and musicals, including a production of The Sound of Music, in which she played the lead role of Maria.

While studying acting at the Stella Adler School of Dramatic Arts, Wilson originally set out to be a dramatic actress, but later started to focus on comedy at the suggestion of an acting teacher.

After graduating from NYU in 2002, Wilson and her best friend from college, June Diane Raphael, began studying improvisational comedy at the Upright Citizens Brigade Theater in New York City, where they eventually ran their two-woman sketch show for a number of years. Performing the long-running stage show opened doors for them as writers. After performing the show at the U.S. Comedy Arts Festival in 2005, they were hired by New Regency Pictures to write the film Bride Wars and landed a development deal with UPN to create a sitcom pilot.

Wilson has cited her biggest influences as Catherine O'Hara, Diane Keaton, Madeline Kahn, Lucille Ball, Bette Davis, Molly Shannon, Cheri Oteri, Debra Winger, and Shirley MacLaine.

== Career ==
Wilson started her comedy career writing and performing with the Upright Citizens Brigade Theatre (UCB) in New York and later in Los Angeles. At UCB, she was a member of the Harold improv teams "Mr. and Mrs. All-Star", "Sentimental Lady", and "Hey, Uncle Gary!".

Among her best-known work at UCB was the long-running two-woman sketch show Rode Hard and Put Away Wet, written and performed alongside her comedy partner and best friend June Diane Raphael; the show ran from 2003 to 2006 in New York and Los Angeles and was an official selection at 2005's US Comedy Arts Festival in Aspen, Colorado. The two women, who first met in a clowning class during their freshman year at NYU, went on to win the ECNY Award for "Best Comedy Duo" in 2005.

Wilson and Raphael's comedic partnership has since branched out into an active writing career in film and television. They co-wrote their first screenplay for the comedy Bride Wars, in which they also played supporting roles. They landed a development deal with UPN in 2005 to create a half-hour comedy pilot. In 2007 they worked as writers and story editors on the Americanized version of Creature Comforts on CBS.

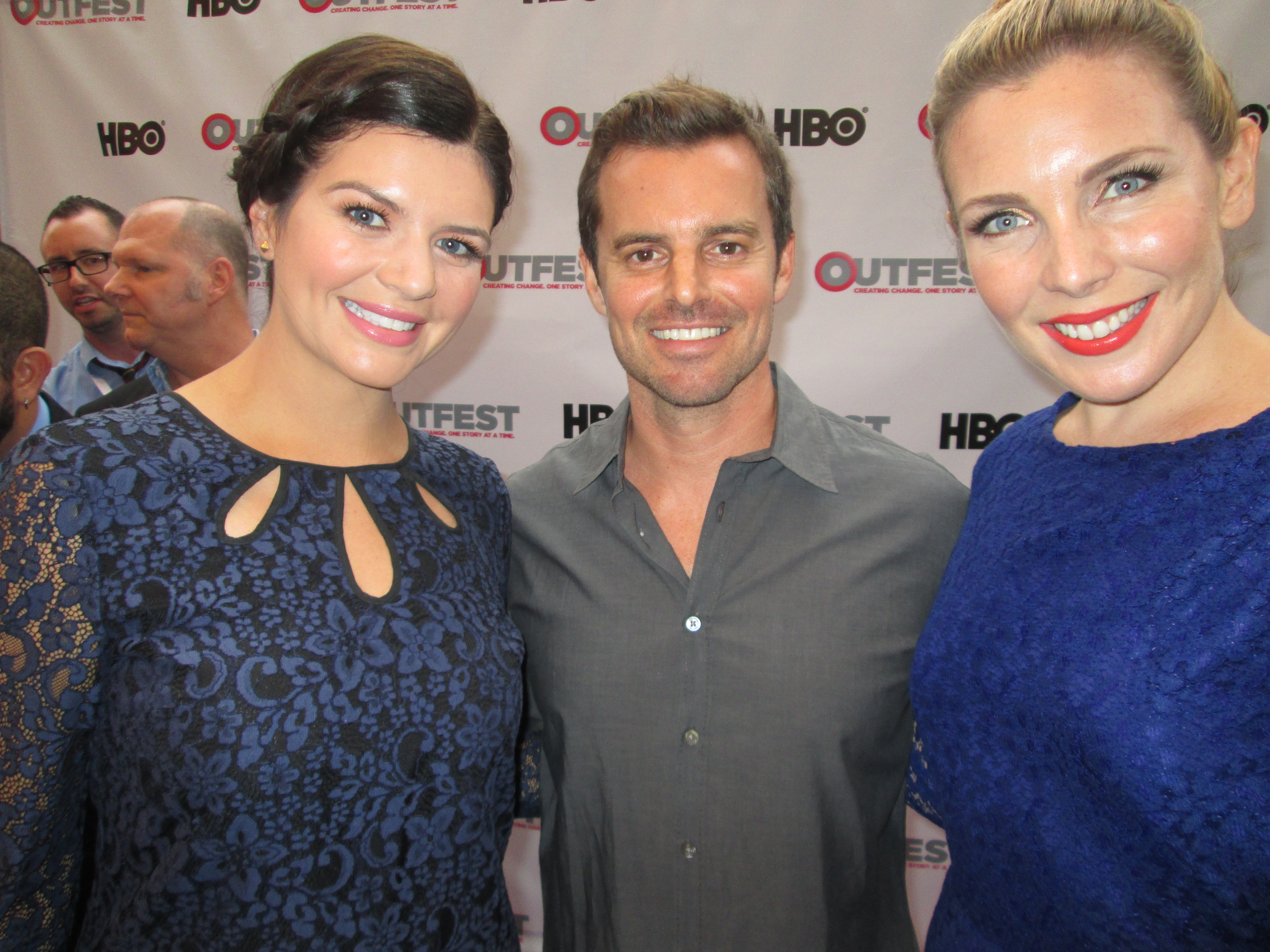
Wilson (left; age 32) and June Diane Raphael (right) with Ass Backwards director Chris Nelson at the Outfest film festival (2013).

Wilson made her film acting debut as an acting student in the final scene of the 2006 Christopher Guest film For Your Consideration. She has since appeared in Julie & Julia, C.O.G., The Breakup Girl, The Guilt Trip, Killers, The Brothers Solomon, Freak Dance, The Great Buck Howard, and the Bob Odenkirk-directed short film Derek & Simon: A Bee and a Cigarette. She also co-starred in the David Fincher thriller Gone Girl (2014), the 2016 dramedy The Meddler, with Susan Sarandon, and the 2019 comedy Always Be My Maybe.

Wilson continues to collaborate with writing partner June Diane Raphael on scripts for film and television. They have worked on numerous script rewrites for films in development, such as projects with Anna Faris and America Ferrera attached to star. As writer-performers, Wilson and Raphael also continue to generate material for themselves. They wrote and starred together in the comedy Ass Backwards, which co-stars Alicia Silverstone, Jon Cryer, Vincent D'Onofrio, Paul Scheer, and Bob Odenkirk. The film premiered at the Sundance Film Festival on January 21, 2013. Wilson and Raphael are working on a second film to star in together, produced by Will Ferrell and Adam McKay's company Gary Sanchez Productions.

Wilson's theater and stage work includes joining the 2010 rotating cast of the Off-Broadway play Love, Loss, and What I Wore (written by Nora Ephron and Delia Ephron) at Manhattan's Westside Theatre. She also contributed short stories to the 2010 book Worst Laid Plans, based on the long-running stage show, in which she co-starred. Wilson and June Diane Raphael created their newest comedic stage show The Realest Real Housewives, which they star in alongside Jessica St. Clair, Melissa Rauch, Danielle Schneider and Morgan Walsh. The show began running at the Upright Citizens Brigade Theatre in 2011.

From April 2011 to May 2013, Wilson starred as Penny Hartz in the ABC ensemble comedy series Happy Endings alongside Eliza Coupe, Elisha Cuthbert, Zachary Knighton, Adam Pally and Damon Wayans, Jr. A breakout role for Wilson, she was nominated twice for "Best Supporting Actress in a Comedy Series" at the Critics' Choice Television Awards for her work on seasons two and three of Happy Endings. In July 2020, the cast reunited over Zoom for the pandemic-themed episode And the Pandemmy goes to... to raise money for the charities Color of Change and World Central Kitchen.

Wilson again collaborated with her husband David Caspe (they met working together on Happy Endings, which Caspe created) on the NBC sitcom Marry Me, which aired for one season from 2014 to 2015. The series starred Wilson and Ken Marino as an engaged couple, and the premise was loosely based on Wilson and Caspe's relationship. She also starred for two seasons on the Hulu original series The Hotwives. The series is a parody of the reality television franchise The Real Housewives on Bravo. With season one (The Hotwives of Orlando) focused on Orlando, and season two taking place in Las Vegas (The Hotwives of Las Vegas), both seasons featured the same cast playing different roles in each season.

Wilson's other television credits include guest appearances on Black-ish, How I Met Your Mother, The Mindy Project, Drunk History, Grey's Anatomy, Fresh Off the Boat, Kroll Show, Bored to Death, Comedy Bang! Bang!, The Middle, and The League; she has also had voiceover roles in the animated comedy programs American Dad!, Animals., Archibald's Next Big Thing, Family Guy, Glenn Martin, DDS, and The Life & Times of Tim, as well as in Littlest Pet Shop, where she starred in the series finale episode as Felina Meow. She plays a recurring role in the Amazon series One Mississippi starring Tig Notaro, as Tig's ex-girlfriend Brooke. In 2017, Wilson co-starred opposite Busy Philipps in Tina Fey's unaired comedy pilot The Sackett Sisters for NBC. In 2019, she began a recurring role as Jane Rosen in the HBO mini-series Mrs. Fletcher. From 2019 to 2021, Wilson co-starred as Tiffany Georgina on the Showtime comedy Black Monday for three seasons.

In 2019, Wilson wrote and directed the short film Daddio starring Michael McKean, which premiered at the Toronto International Film Festival on September 6, 2019.

In 2021, Wilson starred alongside Will Ferrell, Paul Rudd, and Kathryn Hahn in the Apple TV+ mini-series The Shrink Next Door, based on the popular Wondery podcast of the same name. In addition, her book of essays, The Wreckage of My Presence was published by HarperCollins and made the New York Times bestseller list for non-fiction works. In 2024, Wilson and Jessica St. Clair wrote and narrated the audiobook The Art of Small Talk, which includes interviews with Amy Poehler, Colin Quinn, Malcolm Gladwell, Tony Hale, and June Diane Raphael, and others.

In 2024, Wilson took over for Ellie Kemper as host of season 7 of The Great American Baking Show on The Roku Channel, after also hosting the "Celebrity Holiday Special" in 2023.

=== Saturday Night Live ===
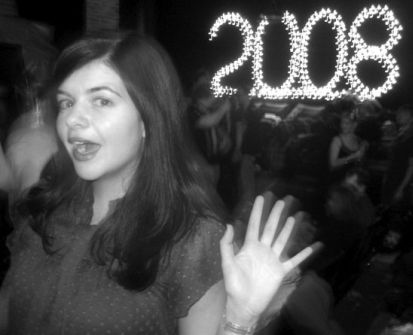
Casey Wilson (age 27) on New Year's Day (2008).

After auditioning in late 2007, Wilson was hired in January 2008 to join the cast of Saturday Night Live, succeeding departing cast member Maya Rudolph. However, due to the 2007–2008 Writers Guild of America strike, she did not make her first appearance as a cast member until the show returned in February 2008; she was the first new addition to the cast in over two years, and was also the first SNL cast member to have been born in the 1980s. Wilson's most memorable work on SNL included celebrity impressions of, among others, Rachael Ray, Elizabeth Dole, Elizabeth Taylor, Ginnifer Goodwin, Katy Perry, and Jennifer Aniston, as well as original characters such as Dusty Velvet, "the paralyzed stripper"; and Toni Ward, co-host of "The Cougar Den". After spending two seasons on SNL, Wilson was let go from the show before the start of the 2009–2010 season. When asked how she felt about her SNL departure in an October 2009 interview, Wilson said: "My mindset is good. I did it for a year and a half. I don't think it will ultimately define my career. And it wasn't the best fit for me."

==== Notable characters on SNL ====
Wilson has performed as a number of notable characters on Saturday Night Live:

- Dusty Velvet, a strip club dancer who was left paralyzed from the neck down following a freak Tilt-A-Whirl accident, and refuses to let it stop her from performing her act. She is only able to perform her "erotic moves" with the assistance of Donnie (played by Ashton Kutcher) the strip club manager.
- Nora Maharelle, part of the singing sisterly quartet The Maharelle Sisters who are regularly featured on The Lawrence Welk Show. Their otherwise flawless performances are always ruined by the fourth sister, Dooneese (played by Kristen Wiig), because of her off-key singing and freakish appearance.
- Toni Ward, one of the cougars who co-hosts The Cougar Den. She is distinguished by her deep voice and offbeat methods for pursuing younger men. For example, she says that for Valentine's Day: "I'm going to suck down some Jello shooters and wander around USC's campus wearing a T-shirt that says: 'I'll pay you and this won't get messy.'"

=== Celebrity impressions ===
- Chelsea Clinton
- Christina Hendricks
- Elizabeth Dole
- Elizabeth Taylor
- Ginnifer Goodwin
- Jennifer Aniston
- Karen Dotrice
- Katy Perry
- Mariam Budia
- Robin Coleman
- Scarlett Johansson

=== Podcasting ===
On December 2, 2015, Wilson and comedian Danielle Schneider began hosting the Earwolf podcast Bitch Sesh, where they and a guest have comedic discussions about the previous night's episode of The Real Housewives, as well as other topics related to the Bravo channel and reality television. Guests have included June Diane Raphael, Andy Cohen, Adam Pally, Jerry O'Connell, Matt Besser, Vanessa Bayer, Michael Rapaport, Elisha Cuthbert, Kristen Wiig, Michelle Collins, and Retta. Paul Scheer announced the show on his podcast How Did This Get Made? and released a special preview episode, describing it as a "sister podcast" to his show, with a focus on discussing reality television instead of movies. Entertainment websites including Vulture, Entertainment Weekly and The A.V. Club ranked Bitch Sesh on numerous podcast "Best Of" lists. In 2022, she hosted the Wondery podcast Fed Up about the F-Factor diet.

== Personal life ==
Wilson lives in Los Angeles and is married to comedy writer David Caspe. They met in early 2010 when she auditioned for his ABC series Happy Endings. After working together on the show for over a year, they started dating in July 2011. They got engaged over Labor Day weekend in September 2013 and were married on May 25, 2014, in Ojai, California. They have two sons, Max Red Caspe (born May 2015) and Henry Bear Caspe (born August 24, 2017). They welcomed daughter Frances 'Frankie' Rose Caspe via surrogate in January 2023.

Wilson shares her family's interest in politics. She was a supporter of Hillary Clinton during the 2008 presidential election and volunteered on her campaign. She went on the road with the Clintons in the Midwest, speaking at and introducing Hillary and Bill Clinton at campaign rallies in Iowa and Indiana.

Wilson and her family maintain the charitable Kathy Wilson Foundation, established in 2005, which focuses on children with disabilities. The foundation screens three- and four-year-olds in the Alexandria community for disabilities. Her father Paul Wilson serves as president, with Wilson and her brother Fletcher serving as vice presidents. The foundation distributes donations and grants to local area preschools and childcare centers in Virginia every year.

== Filmography ==
=== Film ===
Year	Title	Role	Notes
2003	Virgin	Girlfriend	
2006	Derek & Simon: A Bee and a Cigarette	Anna	Short film
2006	For Your Consideration	Young Actress	
2007	The Brothers Solomon	Fertility Clinic Worker	
2007	The Definition of Sex	Abby	Short film
2008	The Great Buck Howard	Charity	
2009	Bride Wars	Stacey Kindred	Also screenwriter
2009	Julie & Julia	Regina	
2010	Killers	Kristen	
2011	Freak Dance	Rich Lady	
2012	The Guilt Trip	Amanda	
2013	C.O.G.	Martha	
2013	Ass Backwards	Chloë West	Also screenwriter, executive producer
2014	Jason Nash Is Married	Rose	
2014	Gone Girl	Noëlle Hawthorne	
2015	The Breakup Girl	Catherine “Kate” Lanley	
2015	Bad Night	Tattoo Artist	
2016	Me Him Her	Cynthia	
2016	The Meddler	Trish	
2016	Why Him?	Missy Pederman	
2017	Don't Mess with Julie Whitfield	Julie Whitfield	Short film
2017	The Disaster Artist	Casting Director #2	
2018	The Long Dumb Road	Sharon Richards	
2019	Always Be My Maybe	Chloë	
2019	Daddio	Abby	Short film; also director and screenwriter
2020	Omniboat: A Fast Boat Fantasia	TBA	
2021	Long Weekend	Rachel	
2022	Family Squares	Katie Worth	
2022	The Listener	Ruby (voice)	
2024	Adult Best Friends	Alex	

=== Television ===
Key
†	Denotes television productions that have not yet been released

Year	Title	Role	Notes
2002	Ed	Student	Episode: "Memory Lane"
2005	Sports Central	Correspondent	Comedy Central pilot
2007	Creature Comforts America	Interviewer (voice)	Episode: "Working/For the Birds/Love, Animal Style"; Writer and story editor
2007	Human Giant	Young Mom	Episode: "Let's Go"
2007	Revenge	Sarah	FOX sitcom pilot
2007	The Right Now! Show	Cast Member	FOX sketch show pilot
2007	The Very Funny Show	Cast Member	TBS sketch comedy web series
2008–09	Saturday Night Live	Various	30 episodes (2 seasons)
2008	Saturday Night Live Weekend Update Thursday	Various	2 episodes
2009	Late Night with Jimmy Fallon	Neighbor Lady ("Pie Sniffer" sketch)	Episode #1.26
2010	Glenn Martin, DDS	Various voices	2 episodes
2010	The Life & Times of Tim	Various voices	2 episodes
2011	Bored to Death	Patti Stevenson	Episode: "Two Large Pearls and a Bar of Gold"
2011	NTSF:SD:SUV::	Ghost Gabber	Episode: "One Cabeza, Two Cabeza, Three Cabeza... Dead!"
2011	Retired at 35	Amy Robbins	Episode: "Pilot"
2011–13	Happy Endings	Penny Hartz	Main role, 57 episodes
2012	Chelsea Lately	Guest host	Episode #6.184
2012	First Dates with Toby Harris	Naomi	Episode: "Drinking"
2012	Happy Endings: Happy Rides	Penny Hartz	Web series
2012–13	Comedy Bang! Bang!	Herself / Eugenia Clemente	2 episodes
2013	Burning Love	Aunt Pam (voice)	4 episodes
2013	How I Met Your Mother	Krirsten	Episode: "Something New"
2013	The Jeselnik Offensive	Panelist	Episode: "Adam Pally and Casey Wilson"
2013	Aqua Teen Hunger Force	Freda (voice)	Episode: "Freda"
2013	Filthy Sexy Teen$	Meg Berg	Adult Swim TV special
2013	The Millers	Beth	Episode: "The Talk"
2013–14	Drunk History	Dolly Parton / Dolley Madison	2 episodes
2014	The Middle	Reverend Tammy	Episode: "Stormy Moon"
2014	The Birthday Boys	Officer Jill Vickers	Episode: "Women Are Funny"
2014–15	Marry Me	Annie Fletcher	Main role, 18 episodes
2014–15	The Hotwives	Tawny St. John / Jenfer Beudon	Main role, 14 episodes
2015	Kroll Show	Genie	2 episodes
2015	Turbo FAST	Ember (voice)	Episode: "Crow Pox/Faking Amends"
2015	The League	Claire	Episode: "The Block"
2015–16	One Mississippi	Brooke	Recurring; 3 episodes
2015–24	American Dad!	Trish / various voices	15 episodes
2016	Grey's Anatomy	Courtney Hall	Episode: "Odd Man Out"
2016	Fresh Off the Boat	Helen	Episode: "Doing It Right"
2016	Animals.	Queen Ant (voice)	Episode: "Squirrels Part II"
2016	Hail Mary	Mary Wolf	ABC sitcom pilot
2016	Littlest Pet Shop	Felina Meow (voice)	2 episodes
2016	Bajillion Dollar Propertie$	Jen	Episode: "Victoria Awakens"
2017	Michael Bolton's Big, Sexy Valentine's Day Special	Herself	Variety special
2017	Throwing Shade	Sally Baker	Episode #1.1
2017	Drive Share	Paisley	Episode: "New Parents"
2017	Black-ish	Patrice	Episode: "ToysRn'tUs"
2017	The Mindy Project	Elena	Episode: "Mindy's Best Friend"
2017	The Sackett Sisters	Sutton Sackett	NBC sitcom pilot
2017	Curb Your Enthusiasm	Marie Deschamps / Jenny Johnson	Episode: "Fatwa!"
2018–present	Family Guy	Jess Schlotz / Dottie / various voices	6 episodes
2018	Heathers	Lexi Anne	2 episodes
2018	Atypical	Ms. Whitaker	6 episodes
2018	Champaign ILL	Jen	Episode: "Loop De Loop Fastballs"
2019	Mrs. Fletcher	Jane Rosen	5 episodes
2019–21	Archibald's Next Big Thing	Wendi Powers (voice)	11 episodes
2019–21	Black Monday	Tiffany Georgina	Main role, 24 episodes
2020	Delilah	Margaret Childs-Austin	HBO Max pilot
2020	Katy Keene	Casey Wilson	Episode: "Chapter Eleven: Who Can I Turn To?"
2020–22	Grace and Frankie	Taneth Fairlight	2 episodes
2021	Solar Opposites	Jen, Stacey Grabowski (voice)	Episode: "The Rad Awesome Terrific Ray"
2021	The Shrink Next Door	Bonnie Herschkopf	Main role, 8 episodes
2022	Human Resources	Empathy Mulholland (voice)	Episode: "Training Day"
2022	Better Things	Yancey	Episode: "Jesus Saves"
2022	Home Economics	Harmony	2 episodes
2022	The Santa Clauses	Adult Sara	Episode: "Chapter One: Good to Ho"
2023	History of the World, Part II	Gloria Steinem / White Mother Mary	2 episodes
2023	The Righteous Gemstones	Kristy Downes	2 episodes
2023	Physical	Deb	5 episodes
2023–present	The Great American Baking Show	Herself (host)	15 episodes
2023–25	Harley Quinn	Betty (voice)	2 episodes
2024	Kite Man: Hell Yeah!	Betty (voice)	Episode: "Mother/Daughter Day, Hell Yeah!"
2024	Based on a True Story	Boobie Bev	Episode: "Liquid Gold"
2024–25	Hamster & Gretel	Elizabeth Knight (voice)	2 episodes
2024–25	Georgie & Mandy's First Marriage	Beth	4 episodes
2025	Last Week Tonight with John Oliver	Wife	Episode: "Sports Betting"
2027	The Traitors †	TBD	Season 5

== Discography ==
=== Podcasts ===
Year	Title	Role	Notes
2009–2021	Comedy Bang! Bang!	Herself	9 episodes
2010–2019	How Did This Get Made?	Herself	4 episodes
2015–present	Bitch Sesh	Co-host	
2017	With Special Guest Lauren Lapkus	Tracy	1 episode
2017–2018	Womp It Up!	Marissa Willard	2 episodes
2022	Fed Up	Host	6 episodes
2023	Garbage Sesh	Co-host	

== Awards and nominations ==
Year	Award	Category	Nominated work	Result	Ref.
2012	Critics' Choice Television Awards	Best Supporting Actress in a Comedy Series	Happy Endings	Nominated	
2013	Critics' Choice Television Awards	Best Supporting Actress in a Comedy Series	Happy Endings	Nominated	
