= Black Monday (TV series) =

American historical dark comedy television series

- Genre: Dark comedy; Cringe comedy
- Created by: Jordan Cahan; David Caspe
- Starring: Don Cheadle; Andrew Rannells; Regina Hall; Paul Scheer; Casey Wilson
- Music by: Kris Bowers
- Country of origin: United States
- Original language: English
- No. of seasons: 3
- No. of episodes: 30

Production
- Executive producers: David Caspe; Jordan Cahan; Seth Rogen; Evan Goldberg; James Weaver; Don Cheadle
- Producers: Steven Yell; Andrew Rannells; Regina Hall; Ken Topolsky
- Cinematography: James Laxton; Carl Herse
- Editors: Eric Kissack; Ryan Brown
- Running time: 29–35 minutes
- Production companies: Shark vs. Bear; Jordan Productions; Point Grey Pictures; Sony Pictures Television Studios (Note: Credited as Sony Pictures Television for seasons 1 and the first two episodes of season 2.); Showtime Networks

Original release
- Network: Showtime
- Release: January 20, 2019 – August 1, 2021

Black Monday is an American historical dark comedy television series created by Jordan Cahan and David Caspe that premiered on January 20, 2019, on Showtime. The series stars Don Cheadle, Andrew Rannells, Regina Hall, Casey Wilson, and Paul Scheer, and follows the employees of second-tier Wall Street trading firm the Jammer Group during the year leading up to "Black Monday", the day when international stock markets crashed in 1987. In April 2019, the series was renewed for a second season that premiered on March 15, 2020. In October 2020, the series was renewed for a third season, which premiered on May 23, 2021. In January 2022, the series was cancelled after three seasons.

== Premise ==
Black Monday is described as taking the audience "back to October 19, 1987—aka Black Monday, the worst stock market crash in Wall Street history. To this day, no one knows who caused it—until now. It's the story of how a group of outsiders took on the blue-blood, old-boys club of Wall Street and ended up crashing the world's largest financial system, a Lamborghini limousine, Don Henley's birthday party and the glass ceiling."

== Plot ==
The first season follows Blair Pfaff, an aspiring white stockbroker on Wall Street. Through a series of farcical events, he ends up working for Maurice Monroe, a veteran black stockbroker. Blair endures workplace hazing and fights to prove he's tough enough for the high-stakes environment. Simultaneously, he tries to preserve his strained engagement to spoiled heiress Tiffany Georgina. Monroe plans to use Blair to execute an underhanded business deal that involves buying out Tiffany's family company, Georgina Jeans.

Dawn Darcy, the only woman among her coworkers, is running out of patience when it comes to Monroe's unwillingness to recognize her value in the workplace. Her husband wants to have children, leading to a crossroads in their marriage. Keith, an employee who takes interest in bullying Blair, turns out to be gay and having a down-low affair with a Broadway performer. Monroe, meanwhile, struggles with the internal turmoil of reaching the high standards he sets for himself, as well as living under a false identity.

The resulting backdoor deals, personal conflicts, and the journey of a particular pin create an increasingly convoluted mess as Black Monday approaches.

== Cast and characters ==
=== Main ===
- Don Cheadle as Maurice "Mo" Monroe
- Andrew Rannells as Blair Pfaff
- Regina Hall as Dawn Darcy
- Paul Scheer as Keith Shankar
- Casey Wilson as Tiffany "Tiff" Georgina (recurring in seasons 1–2; main cast, season 3)

=== Recurring ===
- Yassir Lester as Yassir X
- Ken Marino as Larry and Lenny Leighman (parody of the Lehman Brothers)
- Horatio Sanz as Wayne
- Kadeem Hardison as Spencer (season 1)
- Eugene Cordero as Ronnie (season 1)
- Jason Michael Snow as Mike (seasons 1 & 3)
- Julie Hagerty as Jackie Georgina (seasons 1–2)
- Phil Reeves as Henri Georgina (seasons 1–2)
- Dannah Feinglass as Agent Mills (season 1)
- Danielle Schneider as Agent Fox (season 1)
- Bruce Dern as Rod "The Jammer" Jaminski (season 1)
- Kurt Braunohler as Ty Daverman (season 1)
- Melissa Rauch as Shira (season 1)
- Dulé Hill as Marcus Duane Wainwright III (season 2)
- Tuc Watkins as Congressman Roger Harris (season 2–3)
- June Diane Raphael as Corky Harris (seasons 2–3)
- Michael Hitchcock as Pastor Newell (seasons 2–3)
- Patrick Fabian as Governor Putnam (season 2)
- Xosha Roquemore as Connie (seasons 1–2)
- Sam Asghari as Giancarlo (season 3)
- Thomas Barbusca as Werner (season 3)

=== Guest ===
- Michael James Scott as Chad ("365")
- Hugh Dane as Calvin ("365")
- Paul Rust as Brandt ("364")
- Teresa Ganzel as Trisha ("364")
- Vanessa Bell Calloway as Ruth ("339", "Arthur Ponzarelli")
- Tim Russ as Walter Darcy ("339")
- Tim Heidecker as Not Milken #1 ("243")
- Fred Melamed as Not Milken #2 ("243")

== Episodes ==
Season	Episodes	Originally released	
Season	Episodes	First released	Last released
1	10	January 20, 2019	March 31, 2019
2	10	March 15, 2020	July 19, 2020
3	10	May 23, 2021	August 1, 2021

=== Season 1 (2019) ===
No. overall	No. in season	Title	Directed by	Written by	Original release date	U.S. viewers (millions)
1	1	"365"	Seth Rogen & Evan Goldberg	Jordan Cahan & David Caspe	January 20, 2019 (Note: The first episode of the series was released early through Facebook, YouTube, and Showtime's streaming applications on December 28, 2018.)	0.327
2	2	"364"	Charles Stone III	Jessi Klein	January 27, 2019	0.334
3	3	"339"	Charles Stone III	Jim Brandon & Brian Singleton	February 10, 2019	0.288
4	4	"295"	Reginald Hudlin	Laura Kittrell	February 17, 2019	0.275
5	5	"243"	Reginald Hudlin	Matteo Borghese & Rob Turbovsky	February 24, 2019	0.242
6	6	"122"	Leslye Headland	Story by : Jordan Cahan; Teleplay by : Dannah Phirman & Danielle Schneider	March 3, 2019	0.294
7	7	"65"	Leslye Headland	Story by : Teresa Hsiao; Teleplay by : Travon Free	March 10, 2019	0.313
8	8	"7042"	Justin Tipping	Yassir Lester	March 17, 2019	0.283
9	9	"2"	Justin Tipping	Laura Kindred & Syreeta Singleton	March 24, 2019	0.264
10	10	"0"	Nisha Ganatra	Enzo Mileti & Scott Wilson	March 31, 2019	0.297

=== Season 2 (2020) ===
No. overall	No. in season	Title	Directed by	Written by	Original release date	U.S. viewers (millions)
11	1	"Mixie-Dixie"	Payman Benz	Daniel Libman & Matthew Libman	March 15, 2020	0.081
12	2	"So Antoine"	Iain B. MacDonald	Amelie Gillette	March 15, 2020	0.066
13	3	"Idiot Inside"	Iain B. MacDonald	Dipika Guha	March 22, 2020	0.191
14	4	"Fore!"	Payman Benz	Yassir Lester	March 29, 2020	0.156
15	5	"Violent Crooks and Cooks of Books"	Nzingha Stewart	Bridger Winegar	April 5, 2020	0.127
16	6	"Arthur Ponzarelli"	Tiffany Johnson	Morenike Balogun	April 12, 2020	0.145
17	7	"Who Are You Supposed To Be?"	Tiffany Johnson	Janelle James	June 28, 2020	0.091
18	8	"Lucky Shoes"	Nzingha Stewart	Laura Kindred & Ean Weslynn	July 5, 2020	0.082
19	9	"At That Time"	Payman Benz	Amelie Gillette & Matthew Libman & Daniel Libman	July 12, 2020	0.093
20	10	"I Don't Like Mondays"	Payman Benz	Jordan Cahan & David Caspe	July 19, 2020	0.100

=== Season 3 (2021) ===
No. overall	No. in season	Title	Directed by	Written by	Original release date	U.S. viewers (millions)
21	1	"Ten!"	Tiffany Johnson	Daniel Libman & Matthew Libman	May 23, 2021	N/A
22	2	"Nine!"	Tiffany Johnson	Janelle James	May 30, 2021	0.172
23	3	"Eight!"	Tiffany Johnson	Amelie Gillette	June 6, 2021	N/A
24	4	"Seven!"	Payman Benz	Yassir Lester	June 13, 2021	N/A
25	5	"Six!"	Payman Benz	Bridger Winegar	June 20, 2021	0.070
26	6	"Five!"	Tiffany Johnson	Dipika Guha	June 27, 2021	N/A
27	7	"Four!"	Payman Benz	Akilah Green	July 11, 2021	N/A
28	8	"Three!"	Payman Benz	Amelie Gillette & Laura Kindred	July 18, 2021	N/A
29	9	"Two!"	Tiffany Johnson	Brandon Childs & Daniel Libman, & Matthew Libman	July 25, 2021	0.079
30	10	"One!"	Payman Benz	Dipika Guha & Yassir Lester & Daniel Libman & Matthew Libman	August 1, 2021	N/A

== Production ==
=== Development ===
In 2013, Showtime began to develop the production, then titled Ball Street, but the series never ended up moving beyond the developmental stage. In the fourth quarter of 2016, following the purchase of a pilot by David Caspe and Jordan Cahan, the project was put back into development with Caspe and Cahan in charge.

On September 7, 2017, it was announced that Showtime had given the production a pilot order. The pilot script was written by Caspe and Cahan, both of whom were also expected to act as showrunners. The pilot was set to be directed by Canadian comedians Seth Rogen and Evan Goldberg, who were also to serve as executive producers along with Caspe and Cahan. Production companies involved with the pilot included Sony Pictures Television.

On June 14, 2018, it was announced that Showtime had given the production, now titled Black Monday, a series order for a first season consisting of ten episodes. On October 19, 2018, it was reported that the series would premiere on January 20, 2019.

On April 29, 2019, Showtime renewed the series for a second season, which premiered on March 15, 2020. On October 15, 2020, Showtime renewed the series for a third season, which premiered on May 23, 2021. On January 20, 2022, Paul Scheer revealed on his Twitch stream, FriendZone with his co-host, Rob Huebel that the series was not renewed.

=== Casting ===
Alongside the pilot order announcement, it was confirmed that Don Cheadle and Andrew Rannells had been cast in the series' lead roles. On February 12, 2018, it was announced that Regina Hall, Paul Scheer, Kurt Braunohler, and Eugene Cordero had joined the pilot's cast. Additionally, it was reported that Casey Wilson would guest star in the pilot with the potential to become a recurring cast member if the pilot was picked up to series.

Alongside the series order announcement, it was confirmed that Yassir Lester and Michael James Scott had joined the cast and that Ken Marino would make a guest appearance. On September 20, 2018, it was announced that Kadeem Hardison had been cast in a recurring role. On October 16, 2018, it was reported that Bruce Dern, Melissa Rauch, Horatio Sanz, Julie Hagerty, Vanessa Bell Calloway, Tim Russ and Jason Michael Snow would appear in guest starring roles.

=== Filming ===
Principal photography for the pilot was expected to begin in mid-February 2018 in Los Angeles, California. Filming for the rest of season one began on September 28, 2018, at the Millennium Biltmore Hotel in Downtown Los Angeles.

== Release ==
=== Marketing ===
In September 2018, the first teaser trailer for the series was released, followed in October by the official trailer. In December 2018, a second teaser trailer was released. On December 28, 2018, the first episode of the series was released early through Facebook, YouTube, and Showtime's streaming applications. The program's marketing, rather than using the current "SHO" disc logo utilized by Showtime, used the wordmark version used from 1984 to 1997 to promote the series to its time period.

=== Premiere ===
On January 14, 2019, the series held its world premiere at the Ace Hotel in Los Angeles, California. Those in attendance included David Caspe, Jordan Cahan, Seth Rogen, Evan Goldberg, Don Cheadle, Regina Hall, Jon Hamm, Horatio Sanz, Paul Scheer, Yassir Lester, Ken Marino, Vanessa Bell Calloway, Elia Cantu, Kadeem Hardison, Kurt Braunohler, Jennifer Zaborowski, Xosha Roquemore, David Krumholtz, David Nevins, and Amy Israel.

== Reception ==
=== Critical response ===
The series was met with a mixed response from critics upon its premiere, but Cheadle's performance was widely praised. As of June 2020, the series' first season holds a 56% approval rating with an average rating of 6.08 out of 10 based on 45 reviews on the review aggregation website Rotten Tomatoes. The website's critical consensus reads, "Black Monday zips with irrepressible style and a seductively stacked cast of charismatics stars – but this Wall Street odyssey is too preoccupied with flash to ferment its needed substance." Metacritic, which uses a weighted average, assigned the series a score of 57 out of 100 based on 29 critics' reviews, indicating "mixed or average reviews".

The second season was met with a mixed to positive response from critics. As of August 2020, the series' second season holds an 83% approval rating with an average rating of 5 out of 10 based on 6 reviews on Rotten Tomatoes.

=== Season 1 ===
Viewership and ratings per episode of Black Monday
No.	Title	Air date	Rating (18–49)	Viewers (millions)	DVR viewers (millions)	Total viewers (millions)
1	"365"	January 20, 2019	0.1	0.327	0.105	0.432
2	"364"	January 27, 2019	0.1	0.334	0.171	0.505
3	"339"	February 10, 2019	0.1	0.288	0.160	0.448
4	"312"	February 17, 2019	0.1	0.275	0.180	0.455
5	"278"	February 24, 2019	0.1	0.242	0.151	0.393
6	"122"	March 3, 2019	0.1	0.294	0.173	0.467
7	"65"	March 10, 2019	0.1	0.313	0.191	0.504
8	"7042"	March 17, 2019	0.1	0.283	0.159	0.442
9	"2"	March 24, 2019	0.1	0.264	0.165	0.429
10	"0"	March 31, 2019	0.1	0.297	0.146	0.443

=== Season 2 ===
Viewership and ratings per episode of Black Monday
No.	Title	Air date	Rating (18–49)	Viewers (millions)	DVR viewers (millions)	Total viewers (millions)
1	"Mixie-Dixie"	March 15, 2020	0.0	0.081	TBD	TBD
2	"So Antoine"	March 15, 2020	0.0	0.066	TBD	TBD
3	"Idiot Inside"	March 22, 2020	0.0	0.191	TBD	TBD
4	"Fore!"	March 29, 2020	0.0	0.156	TBD	TBD
5	"Violent Crooks and Cooks of Books"	April 5, 2020	0.0	0.127	TBD	TBD
6	"Arthur Ponzarelli"	April 12, 2020	0.0	0.145	TBD	TBD
7	"Who Are You Supposed To Be?"	June 28, 2020	0.0	0.091	TBD	TBD
8	"Lucky Shoes"	July 5, 2020	0.0	0.082	TBD	TBD
9	"At That Time"	July 12, 2020	0.0	0.093	TBD	TBD
10	"I Don't Like Mondays"	July 19, 2020	0.0	0.100	TBD	TBD

== Awards and nominations ==
Year	Award	Category	Nominee(s)	Result	Ref.
2019	Primetime Emmy Awards	Outstanding Lead Actor in a Comedy Series	Don Cheadle	Nominated	
2020	Black Reel Television Awards	Outstanding Actor, Comedy Series	Don Cheadle	Won	
2020	Black Reel Television Awards	Outstanding Supporting Actress, Comedy Series	Regina Hall	Nominated	
2020	NAACP Image Awards	Outstanding Actor in a Comedy Series	Don Cheadle	Nominated	
2020	Primetime Emmy Awards	Outstanding Lead Actor in a Comedy Series	Don Cheadle	Nominated	
2021	Critics' Choice Television Awards	Best Supporting Actor in a Comedy Series	Andrew Rannells	Nominated	
2021	Golden Globe Awards	Best Actor – Television Series Musical or Comedy	Don Cheadle	Nominated	
2021	NAACP Image Awards	Outstanding Actor in a Comedy Series	Don Cheadle	Nominated	
2021	NAACP Image Awards	Outstanding Actress in a Comedy Series	Regina Hall	Nominated	
