= Marry Me (American TV series) =

American sitcom created by David Caspe for NBC

- Genre: Sitcom
- Created by: David Caspe
- Starring: Casey Wilson; Ken Marino; John Gemberling; Sarah Wright Olsen; Tymberlee Hill; Dan Bucatinsky; Tim Meadows
- Composer: Gabriel Mann
- Country of origin: United States
- Original language: English
- No. of seasons: 1
- No. of episodes: 18 (4 unaired in the U.S.)

Production
- Executive producers: David Caspe; Jamie Tarses; Seth Gordon
- Camera setup: Single-camera
- Running time: 22 minutes
- Production companies: Shark vs. Bear Productions; FanFare Productions; Exhibit A Productions; Sony Pictures Television

Original release
- Network: NBC (episodes 1-14); E4 (episodes 15-18)
- Release: October 14, 2014 – May 14, 2015

Related
- Happy Endings

Marry Me is an American television sitcom that originally aired on NBC from October 14, 2014, to February 17, 2015. The remaining 4 episodes aired on Channel 4. The series stars Casey Wilson and Ken Marino and aired Tuesday nights at 9 pm (ET/PT)/8 pm (CT) as part the 2014–15 television season. Marry Me was created and executive produced by David Caspe with co-executive producers/director Seth Gordon and Jamie Tarses for Sony Pictures Television.

Series creator David Caspe loosely based the premise on his recent marriage to actress Casey Wilson, who stars as Annie. Like Caspe's previous sitcom Happy Endings, this series is set in Chicago.

On November 5, 2014, the series order was upped to 18 episodes for its first season. On February 17, 2015, the show aired its final episode before being removed from the schedule to allow The Voice to air two-hour episodes for three weeks, before Undateable took over the timeslot for the remainder of the season - leaving four episodes of Marry Me unaired. These episodes later began premiering in the UK from April 23, 2015, to May 14, 2015.

On May 8, 2015, NBC cancelled the series after one season. The show was eventually released on a complete series DVD on February 16, 2017.

== Premise ==
This series follows what happens to longtime couple – high-strung Annie (Casey Wilson) and easy-going Jake (Ken Marino) – when their deeply committed relationship turns into a long and bumpy ride on the way to the altar after the question of "Will You Marry Me?" is popped. After six years together, the couple struggles with trying to decide whether a whirlwind of big fights and botched marriage proposals spells doom for their relationship, when instead they discover a series of "signs" that they think means they are meant for each other.

Faced with proposals gone awry and a string of other unfortunate coincidences, Annie and Jake find themselves destined to be together whether they can get it together or not.

== Cast ==
=== Main ===
- Casey Wilson as Annie Fletcher Schuffman – Jake's fiancée and eventually wife, described as emotionally volatile and over-dramatic, in contrast to the more laid-back Jake. Now that Annie and Jake are engaged and living together, she's had a hard time getting adjusted to life as "engagedlyweds" and because of her emotional nature, she often gets easily stressed out, most notably when dealing with things such as when Jake moves in with her, getting along with Jake's mother, and having to host the family Thanksgiving for the first time as a couple. At the conclusion of the series, Annie finds out she's technically a Canadian and after failing her citizenship test to become an official American citizen, she has to quickly marry Jake before she's deported from the country.
- Ken Marino as Jake Schuffman – Annie's fiancé and eventual husband, described as the more rational and level-headed in the couple, he is often forgiving of Annie's quirks and over-dramatic behavior. Now that Annie and Jake are engaged and living together, Jake tries to put Annie at ease during her constant freaking out over getting married and often has to act as a peacemaker between Annie and his mom, while also attempting to get to know Annie's dads better. Jake was previously engaged to a woman named Fantasia Yang, but called it off after he realized she was insane.
- John Gemberling as Gil – Jake's mopey, depraved and divorced best friend who sells hair loss products. His friends are often concerned about him, as his life has mostly been a mess ever since his wife recently left him. It has also been shown that Gil relies too much on Jake as a friend, as the gang has made attempts to help Gil be less dependent on Jake.
- Sarah Wright Olsen as Dennah – Annie's proudly single best friend who works as a pre-school teacher. She is said to have a "take it or leave it" attitude toward marriage.
- Tymberlee Hill as Kay – Annie and Jake's lesbian friend and neighbor. Kay is shown to be sarcastic and eccentric, and often makes references to past romantic flings, such as hook-ups she made on "Boobr", a dating app for lesbians. Her full name is Kay Sedia (pronounced exactly like "quesadilla"). Kay has her first longterm relationship with a woman she meets named Hailey, after trying to keep their relationship a secret at first.
- Dan Bucatinsky as Kevin 2 (episode 8, 10–18; previously recurring guest) – One of Annie's gay dads, both named Kevin. It's been said that Annie got her dramatic side from dads, who named her after the famous Broadway musical. Like Annie, the Kevins are also newly engaged.
- Tim Meadows as Kevin 1 – One of Annie's gay dads, both named Kevin. Both of "The Kevins" often argue which one of them is her biological father, despite the obvious fact that "Kevin One" is African-American and Annie is white. Like Annie, the Kevins are also newly engaged.

=== Recurring cast ===
- JoBeth Williams as Myrna Schuffman – Jake's widowed mom, who Annie is having trouble connecting with. The controlling, type-A personality Myrna usually clashes with Annie over just about everything.
- Jessica St. Clair as Julie – Annie's nemesis who lives down the hall from her. Described as a "Pilates-obsessed, super-mom" who always knows how to make Annie feel inferior. Jake and Annie get Julie to officiate their wedding when they have to throw a last-minute wedding.
- Danielle Schneider as Cassie – Gil's ex-wife, who he's recently separated from. Unlike Gil, she's doing just fine without him and has no desire to get back together.
- Crista Flanagan as Libby Berman – Annie and Jake's friend who recently had a baby. When they attended her baby shower, they couldn't remember the first name of her fertility specialist husband.
- Jerry O'Connell as Daniel – An old friend of Jake's who doesn't like Annie and tries to break them up. He is the leader of Jake's old group of friends known as "The Boyz", along with Gut Boy and Matthew. They later return to perform the music at Annie and Jake's wedding.
- Steve Little as Gut Boy – Member of Jake's old group of friends known as "The Boyz", along with Daniel and Matthew. They later return to perform the music at Annie and Jake's wedding.
- Brandon Johnson as Matthew – Member of Jake's old group of friends known as "The Boyz", along with Daniel and Gut Boy. They later return to perform the music at Annie and Jake's wedding.
- Ana Ortiz as Hailey – Kay's first ever steady girlfriend. She's been keeping their relationship a secret until she was busted by Dennah and Gil.
- Rob Huebel as Wes – Annie and Dennah's yoga instructor. Dennah appears to be his favorite student, while Annie appears to be his least favorite student, as he usually has a hard time finding ways to compliment her in class and often can't remember her name. At one point, Dennah started to date Wes when she was desperate to find a date to bring to the wedding.

=== Connections to Happy Endings ===
It has been implied that David Caspe's previous sitcom Happy Endings, which aired on ABC from 2011 to 2013, exists in the same universe as Marry Me. Both shows are set in Chicago and Derrick, a recurring character played by Stephen Guarino, appears on both shows.

Three of the original six series regulars – Casey Wilson, Ken Marino and Sarah Wright Olsen – also appeared on Happy Endings, albeit in different roles. John Gemberling also appeared on Happy Endings, however as his character wasn't named — he was merely credited as 'Thief' — it is unclear whether the two characters are considered separate people. In addition, several guest stars on Marry Me — including Rob Huebel, Rob Riggle, Nat Faxon and Ryan Hansen — also had guest appearances as different characters on Happy Endings.

== Episodes ==
No.	Title	Directed by	Written by	Original release date	U.S. viewers (millions)
1	"Pilot"	Seth Gordon	David Caspe	October 14, 2014	7.54
In the series premiere, emotionally volatile Annie flips out and goes on a tirade about her longtime boyfriend Jake's inability to commit right at the moment he's about to propose to her, insulting all their family and friends in the process. Following several more botched proposals, they finally get engaged and Annie reconciles with everyone she insulted.
2	"Move Me"	Seth Gordon	David Caspe & Erik Sommers	October 21, 2014	5.61
After Jake moves into Annie's apartment, she feels the stress of sharing her space with someone and slowly begins moving into her car; Gil becomes obsessed with an all-you-can-eat buffet; Dennah tries to change her look.
3	"Scary Me"	Roger Kumble	Jackie Clarke	October 28, 2014	5.06
Annie and Jake try to set up a haunted house for the neighborhood kids in their apartment on Halloween, until their plans run afoul of "supermom" Julie; Gil and Kay use trick-or-treating as an excuse to spy on Cassie, Gil's ex-wife; Dennah tries to make a splash at a Halloween party with a very revealing costume.
4	"Annicurser-Me"	Robert B. Weide	Jordan Cahan	November 4, 2014	4.54
Thinking their anniversary is cursed, Jake and Annie set out to celebrate a problem-free night with their friends to prove there is no curse on the night of their six year anniversary of their first date, until a massive storm hits just as they thought the curse was broken. When the storm hits, the gang moves into the basement for safety, where everyone is impressed by Gil's take-charge attitude, particularly Dennah. Meanwhile, Annie tries to find out what Jake's hiding from her in his desk.
5	"Thank Me"	Rob Greenberg	Andrew Guest	November 18, 2014	5.02
Annie attempts to host the family Thanksgiving gathering for the first time, but first has to break the news to Jake's mom, Myrna, who was always in charge of hosting Thanksgiving in the past. Myrna appears to be supportive at first, but Annie eventually realizes that Myrna sees this as a competition between them as the most important woman in Jake's life. Meanwhile, Gil discovers the strange world of underground cheese tasting.
6	"Bruges Me"	Fred Savage	Andrew Guest	November 25, 2014	3.47
Jake tries to get to know Annie's dads better, but Jake and Kevin 1 bond over their love of motorcycles, it causes some serious trouble between The Kevins. Meanwhile, Annie gets over her stage fright when she decides to help Gil prepare a special musical production at the annual Flemish Pride Parade.
7	"Win Me"	Jay Chandrasekhar	Dannah Phirman & Danielle Schneider	December 2, 2014	4.65
Annie and her dads (who are also newly engaged) compete for the attention of cousin Scooby (Nat Faxon) when they find out he can only attend one of their weddings. Meanwhile, Gil bonds with a group of teenagers after being ditched by Dennah and Kay, who get sucked into a Law & Order marathon.
8	"Stand by Me"	Reginald Hudlin	Daniel Libman & Matthew Libman	December 9, 2014	4.64
Annie and Jake try to help Gil realize that he has become entirely too dependent on Jake for everything. But when they push Gil to take charge of his life, the disruption in their relationship threatens to break the balance in their entire group of friends. Meanwhile, Kay has conflicting emotions about letting go of a former love interest.
9	"Test Me"	Seth Gordon	Erica Rivinoja	January 6, 2015	2.06
The gang attends a baby shower but nobody can remember the first name of the host and they have come up with elaborate ways to hide this fact. Meanwhile, Annie and Jake are thinking about starting a family and their impending appointment at the fertility clinic has put Jake a little on edge.
10	"Spoil Me"	Rebecca Asher	Jordan Cahan, Daniel Libman & Matthew Libman	January 13, 2015	2.18
Tensions mount after Annie and Jake discover one of them has already watched the highly-anticipated season finale of their favorite program, that they had recorded to watch together. Meanwhile, Dennah, Gil and Kay get caught up with a pair of police officer swingers Gary Thick (Rob Riggle) and Laguna Matata (Natasha Leggero). Dennah also enlists the help of her Gary and Laguna to perform a polygraph test to find the truth.
11	"Friend Me"	Fred Goss	Erik Sommers	January 27, 2015	2.26
Annie tracks down Jake's old college friends "The Boyz" when she realizes Jake doesn't have any groomsmen for the wedding. However, the leader of the group, Daniel (Jerry O'Connell), has never liked Annie and is very intent on breaking up the newly engaged couple. Meanwhile, Gil and Dennah get involved in a pyramid scheme.
12	"F Me"	Ruben Fleischer	Dannah Phirman & Danielle Schneider	February 3, 2015	2.14
Annie and Jake spontaneously decide to deface a sign in their apartment building. What they thought was a harmless joke, quickly turns into a hate-crime investigation headed by super-mom Julie, who declares she will evict whoever is responsible. Meanwhile, Gil and Dennah compete for the last "plus one" invite.
13	"Change Me"	Reginald Hudlin	Erica Rivinoja	February 10, 2015	2.18
Jake starts to become irritated by some of Annie's annoying habits and enlists the help of Kay to change her behavior.
14	"Dead Me"	Beth McCarthy-Miller	Vicky Luu & Bridget Kyle	February 17, 2015	2.08
Kay's vengeful former girlfriend takes out her anger on Jake by wiping out his identity records. Meanwhile at work, Annie has to deal with her boss, Janet (Michaela Watkins), who is impossible to please.
15	"Date Me"	Rawson Thurber	Erica Rivinoja	April 23, 2015 (E4); Unaired (NBC)	N/A
After Annie discovers Myrna has been flirting online with a man named Chuck (Jim Piddock), she schemes up a face-to-face meeting between them, but Myrna has reservations about getting back into the dating game because of how Jake will react. Meanwhile, Gil attempts to throw Jake a bachelor party but things do not go as planned. Alternative title: Bachelor & Bachelorette Me.
16	"Mom Me"	Beth McCarthy-Miller	Jackie Clarke	April 30, 2015 (E4); Unaired (NBC)	N/A
Annie finally meets her biological mom, Pam (Nia Vardalos), and everyone is wowed by her take-charge attitude. However, Pam's presence soon begins to stir up tension with Annie's dads. Meanwhile, Gil is determined to do whatever it takes to win a wedding cake making contest.
17	"Wake Me"	Fred Goss	Matthew Libman & Daniel Libman	May 7, 2015 (E4); Unaired (NBC)	N/A
Annie plans to take Jake with her to visit her ex-boyfriend Lee (Ryan Hansen) and show off how well she's doing since they broke up. However, upon arrival she discovers that Lee is in a coma and now she'll never be able to gloat that she's engaged to somebody else. Much to Annie's dismay, Lee is then miraculously awakened by the sound of Jake's voice and the two become instant friends. Meanwhile, Gil and Dennah find out that Kay has written a young adult vampire novel.
18	"Surprise Me"	Rebecca Asher	Andrew Guest & Jordan Cahan	May 14, 2015 (E4); Unaired (NBC)	N/A
After Annie discovers that she was born in Canada and is not a US citizen, she gets the help of Gil, Dennah, and Kay to help her study for a citizenship test. Jake takes over responsibility for planning their wedding, which involves acquiring a wedding venue spot from Molly (June Diane Raphael), a woman who planned to marry herself.

== International broadcast ==
The series premiered in the United Kingdom on E4 on 15 January 2015. The series premiered in Australia on the 7flix on 12 June 2017. The series premiered in New Zealand on TV2 (New Zealand) on 11 February 2015. It was telecast in India on Comedy Central India in May, 2015.

== Reception ==
=== Critical reception ===
Season 1 of Marry Me has received generally positive reviews. Rotten Tomatoes gives the show a rating of 78%, based on 51 reviews, with an average rating of 7.1/10. The site's consensus states, "Marry Me's premise may be simple, but the talents of stars Casey Wilson and Ken Marino – and a top-notch supporting cast – push it past other rom-coms." On Metacritic, the show has a score of 63 out of 100, based on reviews from 25 critics, indicating "generally favorable reviews", some critics made favorable comparisons to the series Mad About You.

=== U.S. ratings ===
#	Episode	Original air date	Timeslot (EST)	Viewers (millions)	Ratings share (Adults 18–49)
1	"Pilot"	October 14, 2014	Tuesday 9:00 PM	7.54	2.3/7
2	"Move Me"	October 21, 2014	Tuesday 9:00 PM	5.61	1.8/5
3	"Scary Me"	October 28, 2014	Tuesday 9:00 PM	5.06	1.5/4
4	"Annicurser-Me"	November 4, 2014	Tuesday 9:00 PM	4.54	1.3/4
5	"Thank Me"	November 18, 2014	Tuesday 9:00 PM	5.02	1.5/5
6	"Bruges Me"	November 25, 2014	Tuesday 9:00 PM	3.47	1.1/3
7	"Win Me"	December 2, 2014	Tuesday 9:00 PM	4.65	1.4/4
8	"Stand By Me"	December 9, 2014	Tuesday 9:00 PM	4.64	1.2/3
9	"Test Me"	January 6, 2015	Tuesday 9:00 PM	2.06	0.8/2
10	"Spoil Me"	January 13, 2015	Tuesday 9:00 PM	2.18	0.7/2
11	"Friend Me"	January 27, 2015	Tuesday 9:00 PM	2.26	0.8/2
12	"F Me"	February 3, 2015	Tuesday 9:00 PM	2.14	0.8/3
13	"Change Me"	February 10, 2015	Tuesday 9:00 PM	2.18	0.8/2
14	"Dead Me"	February 17, 2015	Tuesday 9:00 PM	2.08	0.8/2
