= Champaign ILL =

2018 American TV series

- Genre: Comedy
- Created by: Jordan Cahan; David Caspe; Daniel Libman; Matthew Libman
- Starring: Adam Pally; Sam Richardson
- Composers: PJ Morton; Nora Kroll-Rosenbaum
- Country of origin: United States
- Original language: English
- No. of seasons: 1
- No. of episodes: 10

Production
- Executive producers: Daniel Libman; Matthew Libman; David Caspe; Jordan Cahan; Jamie Tarses; Sam Richardson; Adam Pally
- Producers: Bob Wilson; Ian Durney
- Cinematography: Jeffrey Waldron
- Editors: Ryan Brown; Martin Wilson; Elizabeth Praino
- Camera setup: Single-camera
- Running time: 25–32 minutes
- Production companies: Bro Bro; Jordan Productions; Shark vs. Bear; FanFare Productions; Sony Pictures Television

Original release
- Network: YouTube Premium
- Release: December 12, 2018

Champaign ILL is an American comedy series, created by Jordan Cahan, David Caspe, Daniel Libman, and Matthew Libman, that premiered on December 12, 2018, on YouTube Premium. The series stars Adam Pally and Sam Richardson and is executive produced by Cahan, Caspe, the Libmans, and Jamie Tarses.

On April 10, 2019, YouTube Premium canceled the series.

== Premise ==
Champaign ILL is described as examining how "every rapper has a crew he can't live without...and vice versa" and exploring "how long the crew can survive without being in the limelight."

== Cast and characters ==
=== Main ===
- Adam Pally as Ronnie
- Sam Richardson as Alf

=== Recurring ===
- Keith David as Lafonso
- Allyce Beasley as Agnes
- Curtis Armstrong as Bert
- Sabrina Revelle as Courtney
- Danielle Schneider as Shayna
- Jay Pharoah as Lou
- Neil Casey as Craig
- Rich Sommer as Zack Chevalier
- Rhonda Dents as Lou's Mom
- Adriyan Rae as Tasha

=== Guest ===
- Thomas Barbusca as Cade ("Supreme Brick")
- Matt Walsh as Lester Noyce ("Cherry Vintage Rascal")
- Drew Scheid as Wallach ("Supreme Brick")

== Episodes ==
No.	Title	Directed by	Written by	Original release date
1	"A Gangster Way To Start Your Day"	Maurice Marable	Jordan Cahan, David Caspe, Daniel Libman, & Matthew Libman	December 12, 2018
2	"Loop De Loop Fastballs"	Maurice Marable	Jordan Cahan, David Caspe, Daniel Libman, & Matthew Libman	December 12, 2018
3	"Wowee These Guys Are Good!"	David Katzenberg	Danielle Uhlarik	December 12, 2018
4	"Show Me That Lamb"	David Katzenberg	Dominic Dierkes	December 12, 2018
5	"Supreme Brick"	Eric Dean Seaton	Yassir Lester	December 12, 2018
6	"Not The PT Cruiser"	Eric Dean Seaton	Jason Berger & Amina Munir	December 12, 2018
7	"8.1 Milligrams Per Deciliter"	Ryan McFaul	Daniel Libman & Matthew Libman	December 12, 2018
8	"Cherry Vintage Rascal"	Ryan McFaul	Mnelik Belilgne	December 12, 2018
9	"Stewart Copeland, Andy Summers and Sting"	Payman Benz	Emily Hershey	December 12, 2018
10	"I Wouldn’t Sh'ma Just Yet..."	Payman Benz	Danielle Uhlarik	December 12, 2018

== Production ==
=== Development ===
On April 30, 2018, it was announced that YouTube had given the production a series order for a first season consisting of ten episodes. Executive producers include David Caspe, Daniel Libman, Matthew Libman, Jordan Cahan, and Jamie Tarses. Caspe, the Libmans, and Cahan are also expected to write for the series. Maurice “Mo” Marable will direct the pilot and serve as co-executive producer. Ian Durney will serve as an associate producer. Production companies involved with the series include Sony Pictures Television. On November 8, 2018, it was announced that the series had been titled Champaign ILL and that it would premiere on December 12, 2018.

=== Casting ===
Alongside the initial series announcement, it was confirmed that Adam Pally and Sam Richardson would star in the series and that Jay Pharoah had been cast in a key recurring role. On June 14, 2018, it was announced that Keith David, Curtis Armstrong, Allyce Beasley, Danielle Schneider, Neil Casey, Sabrina Revelle, Rich Sommer, and Adriyan Rae had been cast in recurring roles and that Thomas Barbusca would make a guest appearance.

=== Filming ===
Principal photography for the series took place in July 2018 in Atlanta, Georgia, with locations including Glenwood Park and the Second Mount Vernon Baptist Church. Additional filming occurred in cities near Atlanta, including Peachtree City and Kennesaw, where shooting transpired at the local Electric Cowboy nightclub. Production reportedly wrapped on July 24, 2018, in Peachtree City.

== Release ==
On November 8, 2018, the first trailer for the series was released.

== Reception ==
In a positive review, Los Angeles Times' Robert Lloyd praised the show's main performances and overall tone saying "Pally and Richardson team well and keep Ronnie and Alf sufficiently sympathetic even as they are continually trying — which is, after all, the response they have been formed to elicit (as the Three Stooges before them). It puts the show on that famous fine line between stupid and clever, a line it does manage to walk with fair coordination, working both sides to good effect." In a similarly approving critique, Indiewire's gave the series a "B" grade and praised the show's visual style and chemistry of the leads saying, "Best of all, the two have immediate chemistry. Champaign ILL is well edited with clever visual additions (like texting bubbles and expository inserts) that keep the momentum up, but much can be said for the two men's learned timing with each other."

In a more negative evaluation, Decider's Joel Keller recommended that viewers skip the series saying, "Despite having some of our favorite funny people in it and writing it, Champaign ILL just feels like it's going to be one clunky joke after another about how these two douche nozzles can't manage in the real world."
