= Happy Endings (TV series) =

American sitcom

- Genre: Sitcom
- Created by: David Caspe
- Showrunners: David Caspe; Jonathan Groff
- Starring: Eliza Coupe; Elisha Cuthbert; Zachary Knighton; Adam Pally; Damon Wayans Jr.; Casey Wilson
- Composer: Ludwig Göransson
- Country of origin: United States
- Original language: English
- No. of seasons: 3
- No. of episodes: 57 (list of episodes)

Production
- Executive producers: David Caspe; Jonathan Groff; Josh Bycel; Jamie Tarses; Anthony Russo; Joe Russo
- Producers: Matt Nodella; Prentice Penny; Steven Mesner
- Production locations: Paramount Studios; 5555 Melrose Ave, Hollywood, Los Angeles, California; Chicago, Illinois
- Editors: Sandra Montiel; Steven Sprung; Richard Candib; Cindy Mollo; Robert Bramwell
- Camera setup: Single-camera
- Running time: 22–25 minutes
- Production companies: FanFare Productions; Shark vs. Bear Productions; ABC Studios; Sony Pictures Television

Original release
- Network: ABC
- Release: April 13, 2011 – May 3, 2013

Related
- Happy Endings: Happy Rides; Marry Me

Happy Endings is an American television sitcom that aired on ABC from April 13, 2011, to May 3, 2013. The single-camera ensemble comedy originally aired as a mid-season replacement. The show was created by David Caspe. Caspe and Jonathan Groff served as the show's executive producer and showrunner.

On May 10, 2013, Happy Endings was canceled by ABC after three seasons. ABC's erratic scheduling of the third season, the season's lower ratings and subsequent cancellation, was called one of the "worst TV decisions" of the 2012–13 television season by the pop-culture website Vulture.

== Plot ==
Happy Endings follows the dysfunctional adventures of six best friends living in Chicago: "crazy-in-love" married couple, businessman overachiever Brad (Damon Wayans Jr.) and his neurotic perfectionist wife Jane (Eliza Coupe); ditzy Alex (Elisha Cuthbert), a happy-go-lucky boutique owner and Jane's younger sister; daydreamer Dave (Zachary Knighton), an aspiring restaurateur and food truck owner; slacker manchild Max (Adam Pally), who struggles to hold a job and maintain a consistent relationship; and outgoing party girl Penny (Casey Wilson), a serial dater on an eternal search for Mr. Right.

The series begins with the wedding of Dave and Alex, which comes to an abrupt halt when Alex leaves Dave at the altar. The six friends must cope with a sudden change in the group dynamic as Dave and Alex mourn their relationship and the rest of the group try to preserve their friendship. Dave and Alex decide to stay friends, but there are many more complications down the road.

While the initial premise of Dave and Alex's broken engagement was the focal point in earlier episodes, this premise was mostly abandoned as the series went on. Instead, the focus shifted to the group dynamic of six best friends, in a similar vein of ensemble comedies like Friends and How I Met Your Mother. Each episode typically features two plot lines in which varying combinations of the six characters are involved.

== Cast and characters ==
=== Main ===
- Eliza Coupe as Jane Kerkovich-Williams – Alex's older sister and Brad's wife. Before Dave and Alex's breakup, Jane wished to start a family and live a "perfect suburban life", a plan she abandoned when Alex called off her wedding. Jane is competitive, a perfectionist by nature, and something of a control freak. Despite her Type-A attitude, Jane had a wild past in college, most notably embracing her bisexuality, wearing pink streaks in her hair, and donating an egg her freshman year to finance a spring break trip to Cabo San Lucas. She and Brad are very affectionate in public, which often makes their friends uncomfortable. In season three, she takes a job working as a car salesperson, after dealership owner "The Car Czar" (Rob Corddry) is impressed with her negotiating skills.
- Elisha Cuthbert as Alex Kerkovich – Jane's younger sister and Dave's ex-fiancée. Alex is the youngest in the group of friends. Alex leaves Dave at the altar on their wedding day, a decision she sometimes regrets. She enjoys going on double dates and "girls nights out" with her best friend Penny. She runs a women's clothing boutique called Xela ("Alex" backwards, pronounced "Shay-la") in downtown Chicago. As the group's token dimwit, she often gets lost or confused during many of the gang's jokes, though she occasionally shows signs of intelligence. In season two, she moves in with Penny after accidentally ruining her apartment with smoke damage. She often eats a lot, to the surprise of the gang, though she keeps in shape. In season three, she moves into a new apartment with Dave as they enter a new phase of their relationship.
- Zachary Knighton as Dave Rose Jr. – Alex's ex-fiancé. In the aftermath of his broken engagement, Dave follows his dreams of owning and operating a food truck business, which he names "Steak Me Home Tonight." Dave becomes roommates with Max after his breakup, and decides to be friends with Alex while still dating numerous other women. Dave often goes out of his way to prove he is the "cool guy" of the group, as he is often the butt of his friends' jokes and ridiculed for his fashion choices, such as his love of v-neck shirts. Dave is also known to go overboard with embracing his 1/16th Navajo heritage. In season three, Dave and Alex get back together and try to make their relationship work again.
- Adam Pally as Max Blum – Dave's best friend from college. Max is gay, but does not display the more common stereotypes: he is slovenly and uncultured, and described by Penny as a "straight dude who likes dudes". In college, he used Penny as a beard while he was still in the closet; he still perpetrates this ruse to his parents until coming out to them in Season 1. He and Brad met as cast members on The Real World. He enjoys playing video games, watching sports, and playing pranks on his friends. Max is fairly casual about relationships, more often settling for brief flings, but he notably dated Grant (James Wolk) until Max discovered that Grant did not want children. Max is Jewish, but is licensed as a minister of a non-denominational Christian church to officiate weddings. In season two, he buys a vintage limousine and attempts to start a limo driving service, until he blows up his limousine in a prank.
- Damon Wayans Jr. as Brad Williams – Jane's husband and best friend of Dave and Max. Brad and Jane first met in college, while appearing on the MTV reality show The Real World based in Sacramento, CA. Despite his uptight day job in investment banking, he is generally laid-back and enjoys getting into crazy adventures with the gang. Brad will often show his effeminate side around Jane, while effecting a "manly" demeanor around the rest of the gang. At the end of season two, his department was cut, and he was briefly unemployed. He spent a brief amount of time working as a Bar Mitzvah hype guy alongside Max, then at a children's gym called "Chuckles & Huggs", before he was offered a new business job again.
- Casey Wilson as Penny Hartz – a childhood friend of the Kerkovich sisters. Perpetually single and always seeking the right guy, Penny's tumultuous dating life is often a joke among her friends, and she is usually seen with a new boyfriend or love interest. She dated Max in college before he came out to her, and poses as his girlfriend to his parents. She has also shown romantic interest in Dave. Penny works in public relations and prides herself on being the most fashionable person in her office. Despite her unlucky love life, she remains optimistic, often declaring that it is "The Year of Penny". She is known for her unique pronunciations of certain words (e.g., "a-MAH-zing") and her habit of abbreviating words ("abbreevs" as she calls them). In Season 3, Penny meets Pete (Nick Zano) and the two become a steady couple. After four months of dating, Pete proposes to Penny and she accepts. However, she later called off their engagement when she realized they did not know each other well enough, a decision she regrets.

=== Recurring ===
- Stephen Guarino as Derrick – The gang's "offensively stereotypical gay" friend, who loves to bring the "D-R-A-M-A!" Max first introduces him to Penny, after she complains that Max is not the gay best friend that she wants him to be. Penny later turns to Derrick to pose as her fake fiancé for a wedding, but the plan falls through when his only way of acting heterosexual is to impersonate Danny Zuko from Grease. He marries his boyfriend Eric at the end of season two.
- Seth Morris as Scotty – Max's weird, creepy, and slightly psychotic friend. Max will occasionally call him in when he needs a favor, such as attempting to rough-up a coffee shop mascot or pretending to be a tour guide. He is also the new referee/judge at the annual "Rosalita's Run" scavenger hunt. It has been implied that he is stalking Max.
- Megan Mullally as Dana Hartz – Penny's positive and upbeat mother. She has been divorced three times and is a traveling lounge singer. Dana and Penny used to perform as a mother-and-daughter singing duo called "Two Hartz Beat as One". She started dating Dave's father, "Big" Dave, after running into him at Alex and Dave's wedding.
- Nick Zano as Pete – Penny's ex-fiancé. They first meet while Penny was shopping for a helmet after getting a concussion. According to Max, he is said to be Penny's first steady boyfriend to last more than her usual 10 days before breaking up. After 4 months of dating, he proposes to Penny, but she later calls off their engagement.
- Rob Corddry as Lon "The Car Czar" Sarofsky – Jane's crude boss at the car dealership. Known for his famous "The Car Czar: He Knows What Cars Are" slogan. He briefly dates Penny while temporarily separated from his wife.
- Michael McKean as Big Dave – Dave's single father who started dating Dana (Penny's mother) after running into her at Alex and Dave's wedding.
- James Wolk as Grant – Max's former boyfriend who comes back into his life in season two when he shows up in Max's limo on Valentine's Day.
- Mark-Paul Gosselaar as Chase – Max's former roommate who makes it his mission to ruin Max's life when he least suspects it, after Max accidentally causes him to lose his job and his wife.
- Mary Elizabeth Ellis as Daphne Wilson – Penny's annoying childhood friend that she always tries to avoid.
- Jon Daly as Brody Daniels – Dave's obnoxious buddy from college who often finds joy in Dave's misfortunes whenever he runs into him. At one point he gets in a "fistbump war" with Max.
- Larry Wilmore as Mr. Forristal – Brad's boss who is often unaware that he has food on his face.
- Paul Scheer as Avi – Max's creepy kimono wearing neighbor.
- Christopher McDonald as Mr. Kerkovich – Alex and Jane's father who has run the family owned mattress business for 20 years.
- Julie Hagerty as Mrs. Kerkovich – Alex and Jane's mother. Alex is said to have taken after her mom, while Jane gets her type-A personality from her dad.
- Damon Wayans as Francis "Fran" Williams – Brad's dad, who never tells him he loves him, instead they share manly stories about sports, etc.. Brad's dad has a breakthrough allowing him to experience the feeling of expressing love, saying it about everything except his son. In season one, Brad indicates that his father was in the military, though he does not say which branch or what his father's rank might have been.

== Development and production ==
On January 19, 2010, ABC green-lit the pilot episode, which was written by David Caspe and directed by Anthony Russo and Joe Russo. The show is from production companies Sony Pictures Television, ABC Studios, and executive producer Jamie Tarses' FanFare Productions. Executive producers are Jamie Tarses, Jonathan Groff, and The Russo Brothers.

Casting announcements began in February 2010, with Damon Wayans Jr. first cast as Brad, Jane's husband who does whatever she says. Next to join the series was Casey Wilson as Penny, the group's desperate and single friend. Eliza Coupe and Adam Pally shortly joined that cast, with Coupe playing Jane, Alex's control freak sister who is married to Brad, and Pally playing Max, Dave's close friend and roommate. Elisha Cuthbert later joined the cast as Alex, Dave's ex-fiancée who leaves him at the altar. Zachary Knighton was last actor to be cast as the newly single Dave.

The pilot was ordered to series on May 13, 2010, as a mid-season entry in the 2010–11 United States network television schedule.

On May 13, 2011, the show was renewed for a second season, which premiered on September 28, 2011. On October 13, 2011, the show received an additional episode order of 6 scripts from ABC, citing improved ratings for the series On November 3, 2011, ABC picked up the series for a full 22-episode second season.

On May 11, 2012, Happy Endings was renewed for a third season of 22 episodes. This season premiered on October 23, 2012, at 9 pm.

=== Edits ===
In the sixth episode of the first season to air, "Of Mice and Jazz-Kwon-Do", Dave refers to the mouse he is trying to catch as "his bin Laden" and then went on to joke that he was referring to "Jessica bin Laden, a super hot Arab girl I went to college with. She was the one that got away". The episode, which was taped prior to the death of Osama bin Laden, aired with ABC muting the final line, and removing the line entirely from online streams of the episode. The episode aired with the line unmuted on City in Canada and is also left intact on the DVD release.

The ninth episode of the first season to air, "You've Got Male", originally included a kiss between Max and Ian and was seen among several promotional images released prior to the episode airing. The kiss was ultimately removed from the episode. Before the episode aired, David Caspe explained that the kiss was cut purely as a creative decision and that there had been no pressure from the network to remove any gay content.

=== Attempted continuation ===
On April 3, 2013, it was reported that Sony TV, which produces Happy Endings, had approached a few networks about continuing the series should ABC cancel it the following month, with USA being the most likely to pick up the show. When ABC confirmed that they had canceled the show on May 10, 2013, Sony TV was said to be shopping the show around to other networks, with USA still reported as showing interest. Talks were underway by May 15, 2013, but showed signs of being unsuccessful as on May 16, 2013, the pickup was already labeled "unlikely" as a result of Sony TV and USA being unable to agree on a price. Two weeks later, despite coming to a general agreement regarding financials, it was reported on June 1, 2013, that USA had opted not to pick up the show, with the low ratings during the third season being a factor as it would have required "a large investment in marketing and promotion" to successfully re-launch the show.

As of June 14, 2013, Sony TV was still talking to other distributors, with Amazon, Netflix, TBS, and NBC being named. At this point, there was just over two weeks left to finalize a deal as Sony's options on the cast contracts were set to expire on June 30, 2013. By June 27, 2013, there were no serious talks to revive the series on broadcast, cable or streaming networks, as both NBC and TBS had also passed on the show.

On June 28, 2013, Sony announced that the series had officially ended, citing an inability to find a new home for the show before the expiration of their contracts with the cast as the sole reason behind the decision.

=== Continuation hoax ===
On December 9, 2014, The Hollywood Reporter reported that the show's set still exists despite filming ending on March 16, 2013.

On February 6, 2015, the Twitter account of the show's writers room tweeted a link to a timer counting down to exactly 12:00 a.m. CT on April 1, 2015, with the text 'It's almost a new day'. This quickly led to speculation that the series would be revived for a fourth season, as the account also began following the Twitter accounts of Amazon, Netflix, and Yahoo! Screen - though by February 9, 2015, all three had denied having any involvement in a revival, while Sony had simply stated "No comment". The availability of the show's cast was also seen by some as giving credibility to theories of a revival – Eliza Coupe's show Benched was canceled in January 2015, Adam Pally's exit from The Mindy Project was announced in November 2014 with his final episode airing February 3, 2015, and Damon Wayans Jr.'s departure from New Girl at the end of the fourth season was announced on February 5, 2015.

Subsequent tweets made reference to episodes of the show – including Natalie Imbruglia's music video for "Torn" – and also referencing "four seasons" by sharing a music video by The Four Seasons and the coordinates for a Four Seasons Hotel in Chicago. Other tweets also referenced "waiting" and "anticipation".

In mid-March, cast member Adam Pally stated that "the origin of that 'Happy Endings' countdown clock was not intended to be where it is headed". Two days later Casey Wilson explained that it was a joke by a suspected writers' assistant and that she "[didn't] think it's a welcome joke for everyone. I don't love that [someone] did that" and also stated that there was nothing moving forward.

On April 1, 2015, a tweet confirmed that the entire "new day" countdown had in fact been a 55-day April Fools prank. David Caspe then confirmed the story that Pally and Wilson had told weeks earlier - that a writer or writers assistant with access to the Twitter account had come up with the idea without his knowledge. He did note that after the initial speculation began in early February, the buzz sparked the possibility of an actual reunion but ultimately nothing came of it. Caspe also noted that the cast and writers are all keen for a possible reunion and that he wouldn't be shocked if at some stage in the future something occurred.

=== Episode 401 ===
On July 19, 2016, it was announced that the cast of the show would reunite at Entertainment Weekly's EW PopFest in October 2016 for a live reading of a lost episode of the series. It was quickly revealed via Twitter that the script would be newly written, and was not actually an unused script from the show.

The "episode", titled "Happy to Be Here", reveals that the characters all went their separate ways after a fight between Jane and Brad on the night of Brooke's wedding at the end of the third season. 939 days later (the exact number of days since the final episode aired and the live reading), they all reunite after Alex and Scotty came up with a plan to fake Scotty's death to bring them all back together. Eventually Alex's deception is revealed (as is the fact that Scotty actually killed himself while attempting to fake his death) and Jane and Brad reconcile. In the closing moments of the episode, it is revealed that the entire series was actually a dream Dave was having the night before his wedding to Alex, and after waking her up he inadvertently gives her the idea to leave him at the altar.

=== Ongoing revival attempts ===
There have been multiple reports in the years since the show ended that Sony is attempting to work on a revival, but to date nothing has come to fruition. In April 2020 Casey Wilson confirmed that there has been truth to the reports that Sony has attempted to get a revival underway multiple times but has always fallen apart when at least one cast member is under another deal with another studio.

In May 2024, Casey Wilson said that "they are trying to make it happen" but the hold up is with securing contracts for the show's writers who have since been spread across different studios.

=== And The Pandemmy Goes To... ===
In April 2020, Casey Wilson also confirmed that there would be an upcoming reading of new material, which was announced in July 2020 would be streamed on July 20, 2020, via the Sony Pictures Television YouTube page. In addition to performing the new scripted material, which is titled "And The Pandemmy Goes To...", a live Q&A with the cast also took place. The event was organised to raise money for Color of Change and World Central Kitchen supporting Black Lives Matter and COVID-19 relief. Stephen Guarino reprised his role as Derrick in a cameo during the episode.

During the Q&A, it was revealed that the episode was originally planned to be a table read of new material, similar to the reading of "Episode 401" at EW PopFest in October 2016, but after other shows such as 30 Rock and Mythic Quest: Raven's Banquet remotely-produced full episodes the decision was made to produce and present it as an episode of the show.

=== Marry Me ===
Marry Me is a sitcom television series created and executive produced by David Caspe that aired on NBC, which premiered on October 14, 2014. It has been implied that both series exist in the same universe. Both shows are set in Chicago and Derrick, a recurring character played by Stephen Guarino, appears on both shows.

Three of the original six series regulars on Marry Me – Casey Wilson, Ken Marino and Sarah Wright Olsen – also appeared on Happy Endings, albeit in different roles. John Gemberling, also a series regular, appeared on Happy Endings, however as his character wasn't named — he was merely credited as 'Thief' — it is unclear whether the two characters are considered separate people. In addition, several guest stars on Happy Endings — including Rob Huebel, Nat Faxon and Ryan Hansen — also had guest appearances as different characters on Marry Me.

== Release ==
=== Broadcast ===
==== Season one ====
The first season of the show premiered on ABC on April 13, 2011, and concluded on May 25. The premiere aired at a special time at 9:31 pm after Modern Family and was followed by another episode in the show's regular timeslot at 10 pm. The show was originally set to air a single episode each week that followed, but ABC decided to air a fourth episode immediately after the third episode on April 20, 2011, at 10:30 pm. On April 29, 2011, it was announced that the show would air two episodes a week for three weeks at 10 pm and 10:30 pm beginning May 4, 2011.

The season also aired mostly out of the intended broadcast order to make the initial episodes more "stand alone" in an effort to get more people invested in the show. As a result, the episodes "Bo Fight" and "Barefoot Pedaler", which were intended to air as the second and third episodes as they show the events in the weeks after Alex and Dave's wedding, aired as episodes 10 and 11. It was later revealed that the decision to air the episodes out-of-order was ultimately made by ABC. The episodes later appeared in the intended order on the DVD release.

The episode "Why Can't You Read Me?" was initially left unaired, however it later aired on August 24, 2011.

==== Season two ====
The second season of the show premiered September 28, 2011, and ended on April 4, 2012. The season saw the show move to the 9:30 pm timeslot, previously occupied by Cougar Town. The show then left the schedule to make room for Don't Trust the B— in Apartment 23.

Despite picking up the show for a full 22-episode second season, the 21st episode to air was labeled as the season finale by ABC as they needed to premiere Don't Trust the B— in Apartment 23 on April 11, 2012. The episode, titled KickBall 2: The Kickening, later aired on E4 in the UK on May 17, 2012, and also aired in other international markets, despite the episode officially being held until the third season. Additionally, the episode was excluded from the second season DVD.

==== Season three ====
The third season of the show premiered on October 23, 2012, and ended on May 3, 2013. The season saw the show move again, this time to the Tuesday at 9 pm timeslot, where it aired immediately after Dancing with the Stars.

The first six episodes of the season aired in Canada on City, two days prior to the American broadcasts airing on ABC. KickBall 2: The Kickening, an episode from season two that previously did not air on ABC, made its debut as part of the third season on ABC and City on January 13, 2013, despite having aired internationally as part of season two.

On December 4, 2012, ABC announced that on Tuesday, March 26, 2013, Dancing with the Stars would re-take the Tuesday 9 pm hour, leaving the fate of unaired episodes unclear. On December 21, 2012, ABC announced that new episodes of both Happy Endings and Don't Trust the B— in Apartment 23 would replace the cancelled drama 666 Park Avenue for three weeks on January 6, January 13, and January 20, while maintaining its current timeslot. Only two of the three scheduled episodes aired in the Sunday timeslot.

On January 22, 2013, ABC announced that it had removed Don't Trust the B— in Apartment 23 from the schedule and would instead air back-to-back Happy Endings concurrently on Tuesdays, but it was removed from the timeslot after episodes 12 and 13 aired. However, on February 13, 2013, ABC announced that, starting March 29, the series would move to Fridays at 8 pm ET/PT with back-to-back original episodes.

On April 19, 2013, ABC preempted its primetime programming in favor of coverage of the manhunt for Dzhokhar Tsarnaev and Tamerlan Tsarnaev, after the Boston Marathon bombing, pushing back the season finale date to May 3, 2013.

=== Online ===
Full episodes of the series were initially available for streaming on both ABC.com and Hulu. While ABC.com removed the show, full episodes still remain available to stream on Hulu and to purchase on digital stores. On February 29, 2012, ABC premiered the first of a six-part webisode series titled Happy Rides, which follows the events from Penny deciding to get rid of her storage space, which leads to her selling her first car. The webisodes were sponsored by Subaru. In 2014, VH1 acquired the syndication rights and made all episodes available online using VH1's "TV Everywhere" platforms and the VH1 app but this is no longer available.

As of April 2021, the series is available to stream on HBO Max, in the correct production order. It left the platform on March 31, 2023.

As of June 1, 2021, the series is available to stream on Netflix, in the US. It left the platform on June 1, 2023.

As of June 13, 2024, the series is available to stream on Hulu in the US.

=== Home media ===
Complete season	Release dates		
Complete season	Region 1	Region 2	Region 4
1st	September 20, 2011	March 12, 2012	August 15, 2012
2nd	October 23, 2012	TBA	TBA
1st & 2nd	August 14, 2012	TBA	TBA
3rd	October 1, 2013 (manufactured-on-demand release)	TBA	TBA
Complete Series	August 7, 2018	TBA	TBA

== Syndication ==
The show is available on select streaming services, with rights often rotating.

On December 10, 2013, it was announced that VH1 had acquired all three seasons, with a marathon of all 57 episodes planned for December 31, 2013 and running through New Year's Day. The series initially aired in two-hour blocks every Wednesday, beginning in January 2014. In addition to airing the show, the network licensed rights to showcase episodes of the series online via its TV Everywhere platforms and also on the VH1 app. Beginning August 30, 2014, Logo also started airing all three seasons, beginning with a marathon on Labor Day weekend. The show aired in Australia in syndication on 111. On January 1, 2016, all three seasons began streaming on Hulu and it is also available on Disney+ (STAR) in select countries. In May 2026, it started airing on Great Entertainment Television.

== Reception ==
=== Critical reception ===
The series initially received a mixed response from critics, many comparing it to several similar "relationship sitcoms" that had premiered around the same time—Perfect Couples, Mad Love, Traffic Light and Friends with Benefits. However, as the first season progressed, reviews became increasingly positive - with several critics admitting that the show had grown on them since the pilot. Happy Endings was the second "relationship sitcom" of the season to be renewed for a second season. BuddyTV ranked Happy Endings #7 on its list of 2011's best new TV shows.

The second season received widespread critical acclaim, landing on multiple "Best of Year" lists; The New York Magazine, The A.V. Club, Hulu, the Associated Press, the Pittsburgh Post-Gazette, and Yahoo!TV all included the series in lists of the top television programs of 2011.

The third season continued to receive critical acclaim. Verne Gay of Newsday wrote that "The show exists on the same cosmic (and comic) TV plane as Scrubs, Arrested Development and that other late bloomer, Cougar Town." Maureen Ryan of The Huffington Post stated that "Happy Endings has so many things going for it that the occasional weak story line or meh scene is not a big deal at all. It's one of the sharpest and warm-hearted comedies on the air, and I enjoy it a lot more than Modern Family." Anna Peele of Esquire claimed the show to be the "New and Improved Community."

With the show facing possible cancellation due to low ratings, Rolling Stone declared that Happy Endings was "the most underrated, under-watched series on TV, that may also be the funniest", and went on to say "Despite flying under the radar, Happy Endings has stayed afloat for three seasons by earning both critical acclaim and a devoted fan following. Blending comedic elements of Friends, Arrested Development, and 30 Rock, it manages to serve up something new and refreshing by being both consumed by and annoyed with the frenetic world we live in. It's biting, but easy to swallow – social commentary at its best."

=== Awards and nominations ===
Awards and nominations for Happy Endings
Year	Award	Category	Recipients and nominees	Outcome
2012	NAACP Image Awards	Outstanding Supporting Actor in a Comedy Series	Damon Wayans Jr.	Nominated
2012	NAACP Image Awards	Directing in a Comedy Series	Jay Chandrasekhar	Nominated
2012	NAACP Image Awards	Writing in a Comedy Series	Prentice Penny	Nominated
2012	Online Film & Television Association Award	Best Ensemble in Comedy series	Elisha Cuthbert, Adam Pally, Eliza Coupe, Casey Wilson, Zachary Knighton and Damon Wayans Jr.	Nominated
2012	Dorian Awards	TV Comedy of the Year	Happy Endings	Nominated
2012	Dorian Awards	LGBT TV Show of the Year	Happy Endings	Nominated
2012	Dorian Awards	Unsung TV Show of the Year	Happy Endings	Nominated
2012	Dorian Awards	Wilde Wit of the Year	The Staff Writers	Nominated
2012	GLAAD Media Awards	Outstanding Comedy Series	Happy Endings	Nominated
2012	The Comedy Awards	Best Comedy Series	Happy Endings	Nominated
2012	Teen Choice Awards	Male Scene Stealer	Damon Wayans Jr.	Nominated
2012	Teen Choice Awards	Female Scene Stealer	Casey Wilson	Nominated
2012	Critics' Choice Television Award	Best Supporting Actor in a Comedy Series	Damon Wayans Jr.	Nominated
2012	Critics' Choice Television Award	Best Supporting Actress in a Comedy Series	Casey Wilson	Nominated
2012	Satellite Awards	Best Television Series, Comedy or Musical	Happy Endings	Nominated
2013	NAACP Image Awards	Outstanding Supporting Actor in a Comedy Series	Damon Wayans Jr.	Nominated
2013	NAACP Image Awards	Writing in a Comedy Series	Prentice Penny	Nominated
2013	Dorian Awards	TV Comedy of the Year	Happy Endings	Nominated
2013	Dorian Awards	LGBT TV Show of the Year	Happy Endings	Nominated
2013	Dorian Awards	Unsung TV Show of the Year	Happy Endings	Won
2013	GLAAD Media Awards	Outstanding Comedy Series	Happy Endings	Nominated
2013	American Society of Cinematographers Awards	Outstanding Achievement in Cinematography in Half-Hour Episodic Television Series	Michael A. Price	Nominated
2013	Critics' Choice Television Award	Best Supporting Actor in a Comedy Series	Adam Pally	Nominated
2013	Critics' Choice Television Award	Best Supporting Actress in a Comedy Series	Casey Wilson	Nominated

=== U.S. ratings ===
Season	Timeslot	Originally aired		TV season	Viewers (in millions)	Rank	18-49 Nielsen ratings rank	18-49 Nielsen rank
Season	Timeslot	Season premiere	Season finale	TV season	Viewers (in millions)	Rank	18-49 Nielsen ratings rank	18-49 Nielsen rank
1	Wednesday 9:31 pm (April 13, 2011); Wednesday 10 pm (April 13, 2011 – May 18, 2011)	April 13, 2011	May 25, 2011	2010-11	5.04	105th	2.1/5	75th
1	Wednesday 10:30 pm (April 20, 2011, May 4, 2011 – May 25, 2011)	April 13, 2011	May 25, 2011	2010-11	3.63	122nd	1.5/4	103rd
2	Wednesday 9:30 pm	September 28, 2011	April 4, 2012	2011-12	6.64	83rd	3.0/8	48th
3	Tuesday 9 pm (October 23, 2012 – January 29, 2013)	October 23, 2012	May 3, 2013	2012-13	4.59	98th	1.9/5	77th
3	Tuesday 9:30 pm (January 29, 2013)	October 23, 2012	May 3, 2013	2012-13	N/A (Note: Rankings for the episodes that aired in these timeslots are not available as they were labeled as special broadcasts, which means they weren't factored into the 2012–2013 TV season rankings.)			
3	Sunday 10 pm (January 6, 2013 – January 20, 2013)	October 23, 2012	May 3, 2013	2012-13	N/A			
3	Friday 8 pm (March 29, 2013 – May 3, 2013)	October 23, 2012	May 3, 2013	2012-13	3.36	127th	1.2/5	119th
3	Friday 8:30 pm (March 29, 2013 – May 3, 2013)	October 23, 2012	May 3, 2013	2012-13	2.83	135th	1.1/4	123rd
