= Ass Backwards =

2013 film by Chris Nelson

- Directed by: Chris Nelson
- Written by: June Diane Raphael; Casey Wilson
- Produced by: Heather Rae; Molly Conners
- Starring: June Diane Raphael; Casey Wilson; Jon Cryer; Vincent D'Onofrio; Brian Geraghty; Bob Odenkirk; Paul Scheer; Alicia Silverstone
- Cinematography: Andre Lascaris
- Edited by: Josh Salzberg
- Music by: Orr Rebhun; Erica Weiss
- Production companies: Prominent Pictures; Worldview Entertainment
- Distributed by: Gravitas Ventures
- Release dates: January 21, 2013 (Sundance); November 8, 2013 (United States)
- Running time: 86 minutes
- Country: United States
- Language: English

Ass Backwards is a 2013 American female buddy black comedy film written by and starring June Diane Raphael and Casey Wilson. It was directed by Chris Nelson and produced by Heather Rae. The film premiered at the Sundance Film Festival on January 21, 2013.

== Plot ==
Lovable losers Kate and Chloe are best friends with a not-so-firm grip on reality. The girls have been inseparable ever since tying for dead last at a kiddie beauty pageant as children. Now they are all grown up and living in New York City, where Chloe is a rising star dancing in a glass box at a nightclub, and Kate is the CEO of her own one-woman egg-donor corporation.

Their past humiliations at the pageant remain long forgotten until they receive an invitation to the pageant's milestone anniversary celebration. With unpleasant memories flooding back, Kate and Chloe decide to redeem themselves, take a road trip back to their hometown, and win the elusive crown.

On the road, they face some hard truths about themselves and each other as they encounter drug addicts, spring breakers, strip club hooligans, a feminist farming collective, and their favorite reality TV star, leading to the girls' homecoming and final reckoning with their past, present, and future.

== Cast ==
- June Diane Raphael as Kate Fenner
- Casey Wilson as Chloe West
- Jon Cryer as Dean Morris
- Vincent D'Onofrio as Bruce West
- Brian Geraghty as Brian Hickman
- Bob Odenkirk as Pageant Emcee
- Paul Scheer as Strip Club Owner
- Alicia Silverstone as Laurel Kelly

== Filming ==
Ass Backwards was shot in various locations in Upstate New York, including Albany, Saratoga Springs, and Tarrytown, during the summer of 2010. Production was then initially halted due to an investor default. In 2011, Raphael and Wilson launched a successful Kickstarter campaign to raise money for the film. Executive producer Dori Sperko also helped finance the remaining days of shooting in New York City during the summer of 2012 to complete the film.

== Release ==
Ass Backwards premiered at the 2013 Sundance Film Festival in Park City, Utah on January 21, 2013. The film made its Los Angeles premiere at Outfest on July 13, 2013.

Following its premiere at Sundance, Ass Backwards was acquired by Gravitas Ventures. The film was made available on iTunes and VOD on September 30, 2013, leading up to the film's theatrical release on November 8, 2013. It was released on DVD on January 28, 2014.

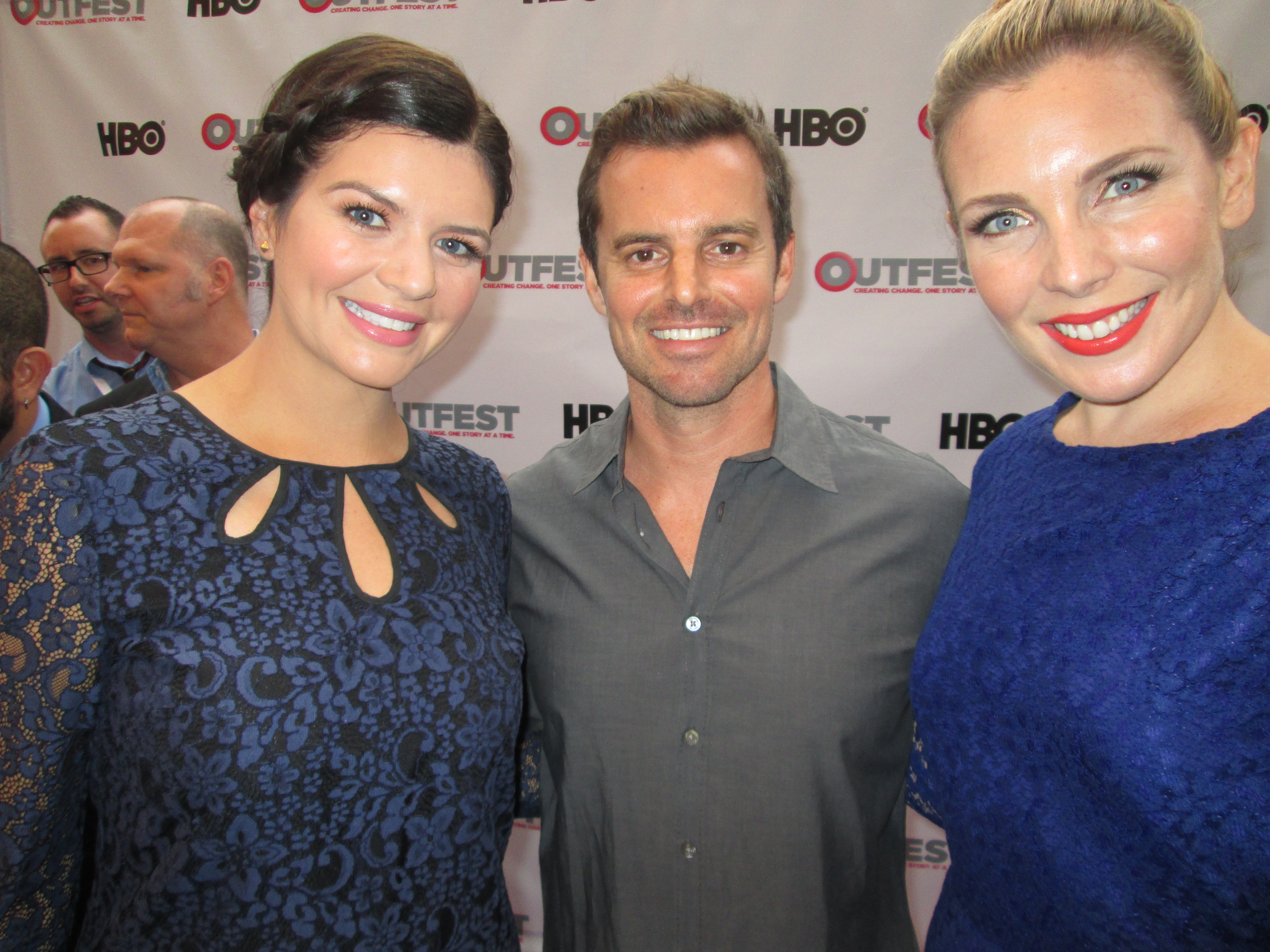
Screenwriters Casey Wilson (left) and June Diane Raphael (right) with director Chris Nelson (center) at Outfest in 2013.

== Reception ==
Ass Backwards received mostly unfavorable reactions from critics. The A.V. Club, Hollywood.com, FirstShowing.net, RogerEbert.com, and CraveOnline gave favorable reviews, but the film was panned by Variety and the Los Angeles Times. At Metacritic, which assigns a normalized rating out of 100 to reviews from mainstream critics, the film has received an average score of 37, based on ten reviews. Film review aggregator Rotten Tomatoes reports that 27% of critics gave the film a positive review based on 22 reviews, with an average score of 4.27/10. The website's critics' consensus reads: "June Diane Raphael and Casey Wilson are sharp comedic performers, but their co-written script gives them little to work with in this meandering farce."

Robert Abele of the Los Angeles Times stated: "The scenarios in 'Ass Backwards', which director Chris Nelson contributed to by filming in focus, feel arbitrary rather than organic, as if the creators' list of humor targets—lesbian bikers, trailer trash, drug-addicted reality TV stars, pageant world denizens—were picked out of a hat."

One of the harsher reviews came from Dennis Harvey of Variety who called the film "a comedy built on the amusement value of stupid people that is itself too stupid to be funny."

On the other hand, Chris Packham of The Village Voice wrote: "The episodic story and minimal budget result in a small canvas over which these two huge characters dominate."

A more positive reaction to the film came from RogerEbert.com critic Christy Lemire: "It's infectious, and the daffy, breezy way the stars play off each other makes Ass Backwards way more enjoyable than it ought to be."

The A.V. Club gave the film a B rating: "Ass Backwards overcomes the obvious beats with clever, occasionally dark jokes that reveal the sharpness of its stars' writing."

Ethan Anderton of FirstShowing.net said: "It's a road trip worthy of National Lampoon or Planes, Trains and Automobiles with two John Candy's. If Ass Backwards is the breakout hit that it deserves to be, then there has to be more in store for Chloe and Kate, two characters that feel like they have been in Wilson and Raphael's backpocket just waiting to be unleashed."

Hollywood.com had one of the more favorable reviews: "Wilson and Raphael have unique comedic voices, as crass as any male counterpart with strong female identity. They go big and physical with Ass Backwards, dressing their alter egos in over the top costumes (or 'high fashion', as it's known in New York) and letting loose in a way that recalls the early days of Jim Carrey. It helps that Wilson and Raphael both come from sketch comedy. They're well-versed in hyper-specific characters—and ones we want to spend more time with, just to see what trouble they weasel their ways into."
