= Happy Endings: Happy Rides =

- Genre: Comedy
- Created by: David Caspe
- Starring: Eliza Coupe; Elisha Cuthbert; Zachary Knighton; Adam Pally; Damon Wayans Jr.; Casey Wilson
- Country of origin: United States
- Original language: English
- No. of seasons: 1
- No. of episodes: 6 (and 1 special)

Production
- Executive producers: David Caspe; Chris Thomes
- Producer: Corey Wish
- Running time: 2 minutes
- Production companies: FanFare Productions; ABC Studios; Sony Pictures Television

Original release
- Network: ABC.com
- Release: February 29 – April 4, 2012

Related
- Happy Endings

Happy Endings: Happy Rides is an American comedy web series, created as a spin-off from the television show Happy Endings.

The web series is sponsored by car manufacturer Subaru.

== Production ==
=== Production ===
The web series was written by Jason Berger and Jen Regan. The first two webisodes were directed by Steven Mesner, with the remaining four directed by members of the Happy Endings cast: Zachary Knighton directed the third webisode, Elisha Cuthbert the fourth, Casey Wilson the fifth and Adam Pally the sixth and final webisode.

=== Release ===
A new webisode was made available each Wednesday on ABC's website from February 29, 2012, which mirrored the air dates of the final six episodes of the TV show's second season.

== Plot ==
The series depicts the events that follow after Penny announces she is getting rid of her storage space and selling everything inside, including her very first car. This causes everyone to remember an important milestone in their lives that took place in the car.

=== Cast and characters ===
The series stars the entire cast from Happy Endings.

- Eliza Coupe as Jane Kerkovich-Williams
- Elisha Cuthbert as Alex Kerkovich
- Zachary Knighton as Dave Rose
- Adam Pally as Max Blum
- Damon Wayans Jr. as Brad Williams
- Casey Wilson as Penny Hartz

== Webisodes ==
=== Season 1 (2012) ===
No.	Title	Directed by	Written by	Original release date
1	"Webisode 1"	Steven Mesner	Jason Berger	February 29, 2012
Penny announces to Alex and Max that she's getting rid of her storage space, which means she is selling her first car.
2	"Webisode 2"	Steven Mesner	Jen Regan	March 7, 2012
Jane and Brad hear of Penny's plans and reminisce about when they went to an Eagle-Eye Cherry concert.
3	"Webisode 3"	Zachary Knighton	Jason Berger	March 14, 2012
Max attempts to end his decade-long debate with Dave about Waterworld.
4	"Webisode 4"	Elisha Cuthbert	Jason Berger	March 21, 2012
As Penny waits for the buyer of her car, she recollects how she got the 1998 Chicago Bulls championship ring that is on her set of keys.
5	"Webisode 5"	Casey Wilson	Jen Regan	March 28, 2012
While going through a box that was at the back of Penny's truck with Max, Alex stumbles across her old pager and attempts to contact her past-self.
6	"Webisode 6"	Adam Pally	Jen Regan	April 4, 2012
Penny meets with the gang to say farewell to her truck before meeting with the potential buyer.

=== Special (2012) ===
Title	Original release date
"Happy Rides - Behind the Scenes!"	April 4, 2012
A behind-the-scenes special of the 'Happy Rides' webisodes, hosted by Ben Begley.

== Reception ==
The series has received high praise, noting that it doesn't stray from the show's signature tone. It has also been praised as the webisodes "feels like a bonus episode" as they were used to promote Subaru's "First Car" promotion rather than promoting a product within the series. The actors also received praise, with some noting "the actors are in top form".
