= Mariam Budia =

Spanish writer, researcher and playwright (born 1970)

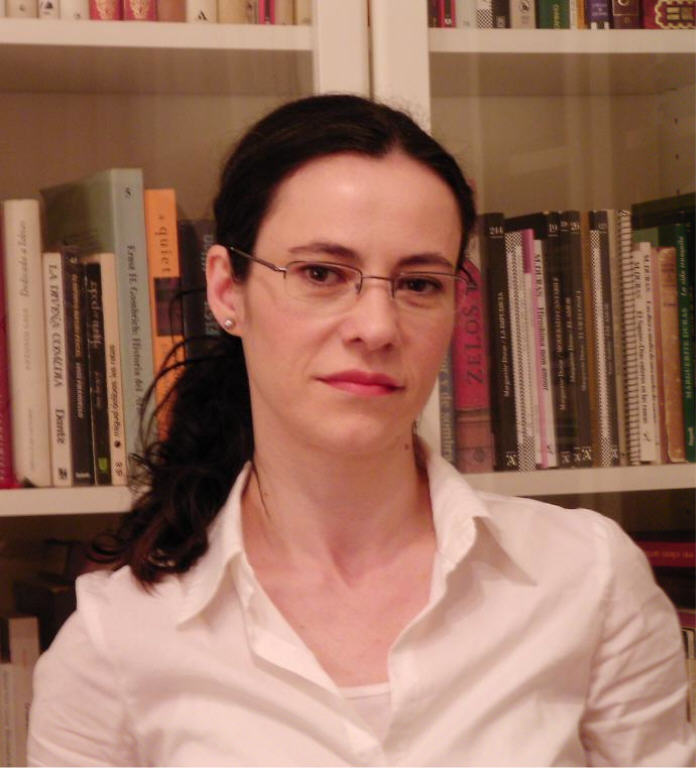
Mariam Budia

Mariam Budia (born 14 March 1970 in Logroño (La Rioja), Spain) is a Spanish writer, researcher, and playwright.

== Biography ==
Mariam Budia has a doctorate in Spanish Studies in the "Theory, History and Practice of Drama" from the University of Alcalá. She graduated in Drama at the Royal Superior Drama School, RESAD, and has diplomas of honor in Music from the La Rioja Professional Music Conservatory.

She has worked as a professor at Korea University teaching Spanish Literature, where she got Excellent Teaching Awards, as well as a professor at Kobe City University of Foreign Studies, Japan.

In her role as a writer, she stands out in the search for new languages to free her characters from their natural environment. Some of her works have been translated into English and Korean.

She also makes collaborations in national magazines and newspapers and radio stations as well.

== Literary works ==
Among her published work we can list:

- Historias del comediante fiel ISBN 978-84-946246-0-5
- Teatro del desarraigo (1) ISBN 978-84-245-1038-1
- Teatro del desarraigo (2) ISBN 978-84-245-1065-7
- Teatro del desarraigo (3) ISBN 978-1-59754-382-8
- Antología de comedia y humor, (Budia, et al.) Ediciones Irreverentes, Madrid. ISBN 978-84-16107-32-2
- El tamaño no importa V, (Budia, et al.) Ediciones Antígona - AAT, Madrid. ISBN 978-84-96837-25-6
- Al Soslayo
- Cancán del Moulin
- La mujer Sakura written in Japan.
- Prohibido autolesionarse
- Carlaño

== Dramatizations of her works ==
Among others:

- ¿Dentro del matrimonio?, in Fernando de Rojas Theatre, Madrid. Director: Julián Quintanilla, Actress: Loles León.
- La indignación de Sinforoso, in XV Salón Internacional del Libro Teatral, Madrid. Director: Quino Falero, Actors: Manuel Galiana and Sofía Valero.
- La chocolatina, in XXII Salón Internacional del Libro Teatral, Madrid. Director: Fernando Sansegundo, Actress: Huichi Chiu.
- Cerrad las ventanas, in Fernando de Rojas Theatre, Madrid. Director: Pedro Víllora, Actress: María Luisa Merlo.

== Research ==
As a researcher, among others:

- "Aproximación a los elementos formales y filosóficos de Dragón, obra inconclusa de García Lorca" in Estudios Hispánicos, No. 60, Seoul: Korean Association of Hispanists. ISSN 1738-2130:
- "Comedia sin título de García Lorca: ensayo dramatizado para una didáctica inconclusa" in The Korean Journal of Hispanic Studies, Seoul: Korea University. ISSN 2092-4984
- "Aproximación a las estrategias creativas en Así que pasen cinco años: tiempo absoluto y subconsciente" in Teatro (Revista de Estudios Escénicos), No. 21, Madrid: Atheneum of Madrid- University of Alcalá. ISSN 1132-2233

== Studies of her plays ==
- Prof. Pérez Jiménez, Manuel (UAH), Concepto de desarraigo y polimorfismo estético, in Digital Library University of Alcalá.
- Prof. Alba Peinado, Alba (UNED), Prohibido autolesionarse: poéticas del desarraigo, in Leer Teatro No. 5.
- Prof. Pérez Jiménez, Manuel (UAH), Del desarraigo a la esperanza, un teatro de nuestro tiempo, in Digital Library University of Alcalá.
