= Zachary Knighton =

American actor (born 1978)

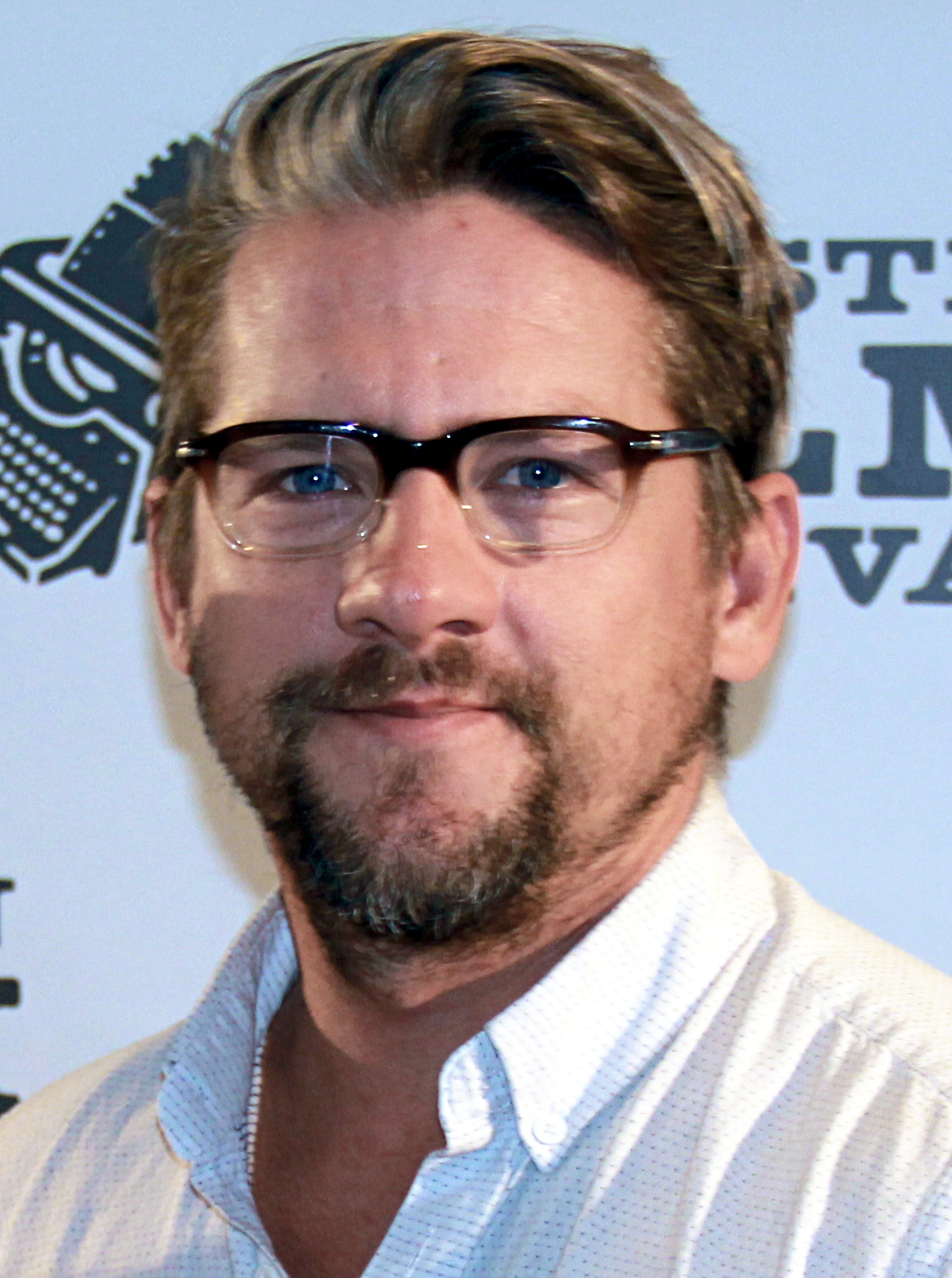
- Knighton at 2016 Austin Film Festival
- Born: Zachary Andrew Knighton; October 25, 1978 (age 47); Alexandria, Virginia, U.S.
- Occupation: Actor
- Years active: 2000–present
- Spouses: Hang Knighton (m. 2008; div. 2015) Betsy Phillips (m. 2018)
- Children: 3

Zachary Andrew Knighton (born October 25, 1978) is an American actor, best known for starring as Dave Rose on the ABC comedy series Happy Endings from 2011 to 2013 and as Orville "Rick" Wright in the rebooted version of Magnum P.I. from 2018 to 2024. Other notable roles on television include starring roles on ABC's science fiction series FlashForward and in the FOX sitcoms Life on a Stick and Weird Loners.

== Life and career ==
Knighton was born in Alexandria, Virginia. He graduated from Frank W. Cox High School in Virginia Beach, Virginia and the Governor's School for the Arts in 1996. Later, he attended Virginia Commonwealth University.

In 2007, he starred in the horror film remake The Hitcher, with Sophia Bush, playing the role originally performed by C. Thomas Howell. Previously, Knighton played Laz Lackerson on the short-lived television program, Life on a Stick. He starred as Gary on the series Related.

In 2009, he was cast as Bryce Varley in the science fiction series FlashForward, based on the novel by Robert J. Sawyer. Knighton had originally auditioned for the role of Demetri Noh but lost out to John Cho. The show's co-creator David S. Goyer then rewrote the role of Bryce Varley for Knighton. The show was cancelled after one season.

From April 2011 to May 2013, Knighton starred as Dave Rose on the ABC comedy series Happy Endings, alongside Eliza Coupe, Elisha Cuthbert, Adam Pally, Damon Wayans Jr. and Casey Wilson. Despite critical acclaim and a cult following, the show was cancelled by ABC after concluding its third season on May 3, 2013. BuddyTV ranked him #94 on its list of "TV's Sexiest Men of 2011" and #100 in "TV's Sexiest Men of 2012".

In 2014, Knighton appeared in a recurring guest arc in the 5th season of the NBC series Parenthood. He also starred on the FOX sitcom Weird Loners.

In 2018, Knighton was cast in the recurring role of Paul on the second season of the Netflix horror-comedy series Santa Clarita Diet. In 2018, Knighton was cast in the main role of Rick Wright on the CBS drama series Magnum P.I.. The series was canceled after four seasons on CBS, but was picked up by NBC in 2022 with a 20-episode order that debuted in 2023.

== Filmography ==
=== Film ===
Year	Title	Role	Notes
2000	Cherry Falls	Mr. Rolly	
2002	La vie nouvelle	Seymour	
2003	The Mudge Boy	Travis	
2004	The Prince & Me	John Morgan	
2007	The Hitcher	Jim Halsey	
2008	Surfer, Dude	Billo Murphy	
2010	Tug	Judd	
2011	Satellite of Love	Blake	
2013	The Big Ask	Dave	
2014	Believe Me	Gabriel	
2014	Hot	Benny	
2015	Ashby	Father Ted	
2016	Come and Find Me	Charlie	
2017	Big Bear	Colin	
2018	Little Bitches	Mr. Warner	
2020	The Pale Door	Duncan	

=== Television ===
Year	Title	Role	Notes
2001	Ed	Stephen	1 episode
2001	Law & Order	Paul Wyler	1 episode
2004	Law & Order: Special Victims Unit	Lukas Ian Croft	1 episode
2005	Life on a Stick	Laz Lackerson	Main role, 13 episodes
2005	Love, Inc.	Brad	1 episode
2006	Related	Gary	2 episodes
2007	Supreme Courtships	Clyde	Television movie
2008, 2013, 2025	It's Always Sunny in Philadelphia	Random Guy	2 episodes; Director: "Thought Leadership: A Corporate Conversation"
2009	Bones	Chet Newcomb	1 episode
2009–10	FlashForward	Dr. Bryce Varley	Main role, 22 episodes
2010	House	Billy	Episode: "Message Therapy"
2011–13	Happy Endings	Dave Rose	Main role, 57 episodes
2012	Happy Endings: Happy Rides	Dave Rose	Web series
2013	Wilfred	Bill the Mailman	1 episode
2014	Parenthood	Evan Knight	Recurring role, 5 episodes
2015	Weird Loners	Stosh Lewandoski	Main role, 6 episodes
2016	The Catch	Morgan Foster	2 episodes
2016	House of Lies	Max	Episode: "One-Eighty"
2016	Elementary	Aaron Stone	Episode: "Render, and Then Seize Her"
2017	Fresh Off the Boat	Doug	Episode: "How to Be an American"
2017	The Good Fight	Dr. Randolph Picot	Episode: "The Schtup List"
2018–19	Santa Clarita Diet	Paul	Recurring role, 4 episodes
2018	LA to Vegas	Bryan	Recurring role, 6 episodes
2018	StartUp	Tucker Saginaw	6 episodes
2018–24	Magnum P.I.	Orville "Rick" Wright	Main role
2020	Hawaii Five-0	Orville "Rick" Wright	2 episodes (crossovers with Magnum P.I.)
2025	The Equalizer	Colonel Strickland	Episode: "A Few Good Women"
