= Jamie Tarses =

American television producer (1964–2021)

- Born: Sara James Tarses; March 16, 1964; Pittsburgh, Pennsylvania, U.S.
- Died: February 1, 2021 (aged 56); Los Angeles, California, U.S.
- Other name: Jamie McDermott
- Education: Williams College
- Occupations: Producer; Studio executive
- Years active: 1985–2021
- Known for: Friends; My Boys; Happy Endings
- Spouse: Dan McDermott (m. 1993; div. 1996)
- Partner: Paddy Aubrey
- Children: 2
- Parent(s): Jay Tarses; Rachel Tarses

Sara James Tarses (March 16, 1964 – February 1, 2021) was an American television producer and television studio executive. She was the president of ABC Entertainment from 1996 to 1999, the first woman and one of the youngest people to hold such a post in an American broadcast network.

== Early life ==
Tarses was born in Pittsburgh, Pennsylvania, the daughter of television writer Jay Tarses and Rachel Tarses (née Newdell), on March 16, 1964. Her younger sister, Mallory Tarses, is a fiction writer and high school English teacher, and a younger brother, Matt Tarses, is a producer and screenwriter (The Goldbergs, Scrubs, Sports Night).

Tarses graduated from Williams College in 1985 with a degree in theater.

== Career ==
=== Casting director ===
After graduating from college, Tarses became an assistant to the talent executive on the 1985–1986 season of Saturday Night Live. She then worked as a casting director for Lorimar Productions, filling roles for mid-run Perfect Strangers.

=== Network executive ===
In September 1987, Tarses was hired by NBC Productions' Brandon Tartikoff as the manager of creative affairs. She climbed the corporate ladder at NBC until 1996. Here, she helped develop Friends, Mad About You, Frasier, NewsRadio, and Caroline in the City. In 1991, she passed on her father's pilot about jazz musicians, called Baltimore.

Tarses left NBC in 1996 amidst a significant amount of press coverage. From 1996 to 1999, she was president of ABC Entertainment. She resigned in August 1999 with two years remaining on her contract. At the time of her departure she had one sitcom, one comedy, and one legal drama on ABC's schedule.

Tarses was the subject of what Bill Carter of The New York Times called an "unflattering profile" written by Lynn Hirschberg in The New York Times Magazine in July 1997, in which she "was portrayed as an embattled executive whose competence and professionalism was being questioned in Hollywood show business circles".

Amanda Peet, who played Jordan McDeere, the head of fictional network NBS on the NBC show Studio 60 on the Sunset Strip, said her character "is loosely based" on Tarses. Tarses was a consultant for Studio 60.

While at ABC, she helped develop and greenlight Dharma & Greg.

=== Producer ===
In 2005, Tarses partnered on a production company called Pariah Productions with producer Gavin Polone. Later, she had a company called FanFare Productions at Sony Pictures Television.

Tarses was co-producer of My Boys, a comedy about a female sports reporter starring Jordana Spiro, on TBS cable television network from November 28, 2006, until September 14, 2010. In 2010, she produced several television series, including Mr. Sunshine, Happy Endings, and Franklin & Bash.

== Personal life ==
Tarses married DreamWorks SKG television executive Dan McDermott in 1993. They divorced in 1996. Tarses also dated Robert Morton, executive producer of Late Show with David Letterman, and Matthew Perry. She had two children, Wyatt and Sloane, with her partner Paddy Aubrey, an executive chef and restaurant owner.

She served on the board of directors and the advisory board of directors for Young Storytellers, an arts education nonprofit organization based in Los Angeles. She was a volunteer at Cedars-Sinai Medical Center.

== Death ==
Tarses had a stroke in the fall of 2020, spent time in a coma, and then died in Los Angeles on February 1, 2021, at age 56 from what a family spokesperson called "complications of a cardiac event".

== Filmography ==
=== TV series ===
- 1985–1986: Saturday Night Live – Production staff (18 episodes)
- 1987–1988: Perfect Strangers – Casting director (12 episodes)
- 2006–2007: Studio 60 on the Sunset Strip – Consultant (13 episodes)
- 2006–2010: My Boys – Executive producer (37 episodes)
- 2009–2011: Hawthorne – Executive producer (24 episodes)
- 2011: Mad Love – Executive producer (13 episodes)
- 2011: Mr. Sunshine – Executive producer (6 episodes)
- 2011–2013: Happy Endings – Executive producer (57 episodes)
- 2011–2014: Franklin & Bash – Executive producer (30 episodes)
- 2012: Made in Jersey – Executive producer (6 episodes)
- 2012–2014: Men at Work – Executive producer (30 episodes)
- 2013: Bastards – Executive producer
- 2014: Really – Executive producer (1 episode)
- 2014–2015: Marry Me – Executive producer (17 episodes)
- 2014: Cuz-Bros – Executive producer
- 2015: Your Family or Mine – Executive producer
- 2017: The Mayor – Executive producer
- 2020–2021: The Wilds – Executive producer

=== TV movies ===
- 2001: Tikiville – Executive producer
- 2003: Crazy Love – Executive producer
- 2004: Nevermind Nirvana – Executive producer
- 2006: The Angriest Man in Suburbia – Executive producer
- 2006: More, Patience – Executive producer
- 2007: Primeval – Executive producer
- 2007: Backyards & Bullets – Executive producer
- 2008: Held Up – Executive producer
- 2009: Eva Adams – Executive producer
- 2010: Held Up – Executive producer
- 2012: Happy Valley – Executive producer
- 2014: Duty – Executive producer

Business positions
Preceded by Ted Harbert	President of ABC Entertainment; 1996–1999	Succeeded by Susan M. Lyne
