= David Caspe =

Writer and producer

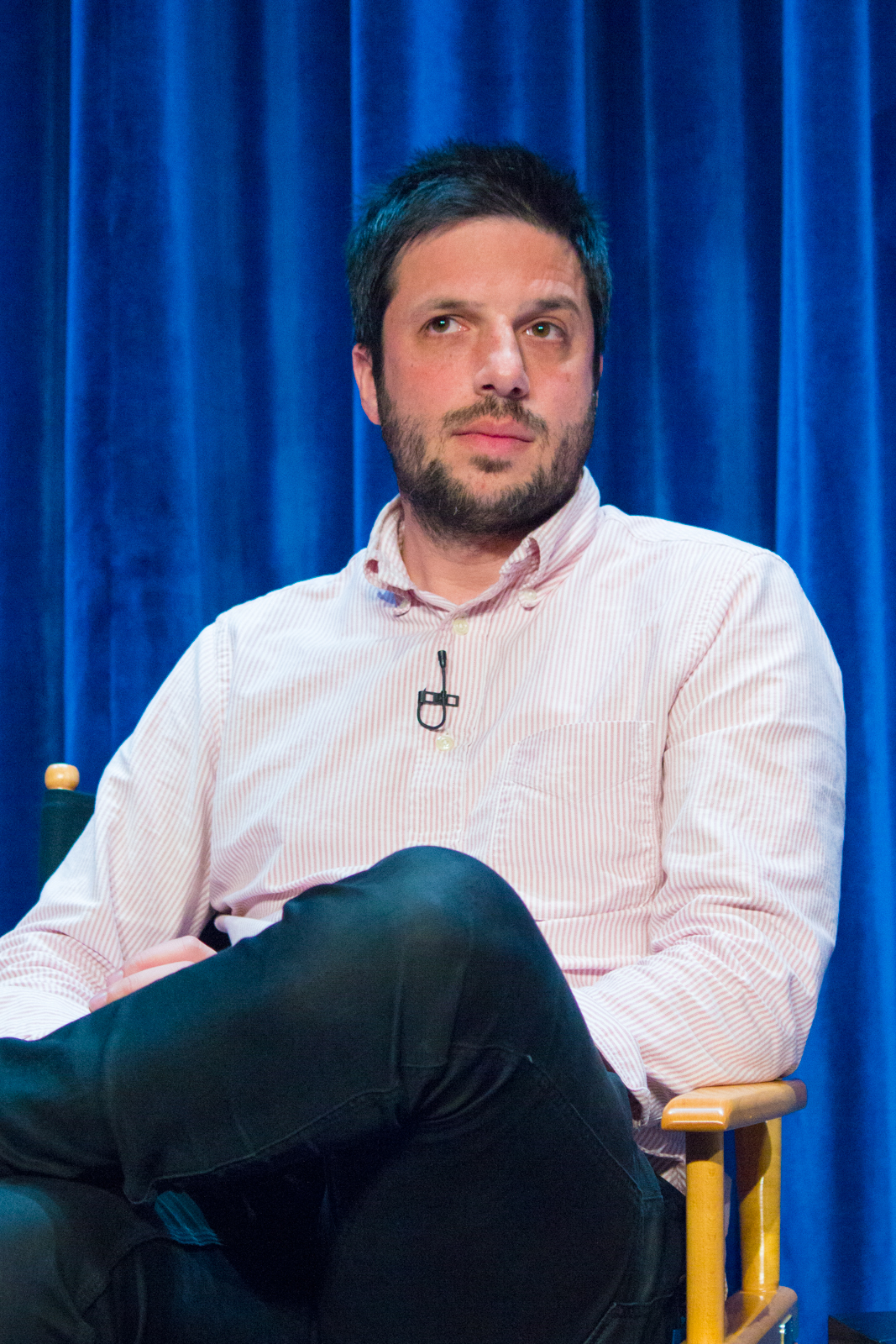
- Caspe at the PaleyFest Fall TV Previews 2014 for Marry Me
- Born: October 20, 1978 (age 48)
- Occupations: Writer, producer, director
- Spouse: Casey Wilson (m. 2014)
- Children: 3
- Writing career
- Years active: 2006–present

David Herbert Caspe (born October 20, 1978) is an American film and television writer. As a writer-producer, he is best known for his work in television as creator of sitcoms such as ABC's Happy Endings, the Showtime comedy Black Monday, and the NBC sitcoms Kenan and Marry Me. Other work includes writing the 2012 film That's My Boy and co-creating the YouTube Premium series Champaign ILL.

== Life and career ==
David Herbert Caspe grew up in Chicago, Illinois. In 2006, Caspe moved to Los Angeles to pursue a career in screenwriting. In 2010, his screenplay for I Hate You, Dad (later re-titled That's My Boy) was picked up by Sony and Happy Madison productions. The film starred Adam Sandler and Andy Samberg, and was released on June 15, 2012.

Caspe's ABC series Happy Endings ran for three seasons, ending its run on May 3, 2013. As well as creating the series, he was also the executive producer and co-showrunner. He went on to create the NBC sitcom Marry Me, which he again collaborated on with his wife Casey Wilson (they had previously met on Happy Endings); the premise was loosely based on Wilson and Caspe's relationship. The series starred Wilson and Ken Marino as a newly engaged couple and ran for one season from 2014 to 2015. Caspe is known to set his shows in his hometown of Chicago.

Along with Jordan Cahan and Daniel & Matthew Libman, Caspe co-created the YouTube Premium series Champaign ILL starring Adam Pally, Sam Richardson, and Jay Pharoah. The series premiered on December 12, 2018.

His next series Black Monday was picked up by Showtime in 2017, starring Don Cheadle, Regina Hall, and Andrew Rannells. Caspe and co-creator Jordan Cahan served as showrunners and produced the show alongside executive producers Seth Rogen and Evan Goldberg. The first season premiered on January 20, 2019. The series concluded on August 1, 2021, after three seasons.

In July 2020, Caspe was brought in as the showrunner and executive producer to work with co-creator Jackie Clarke and to develop the re-tooled pilot and first season for the new NBC sitcom Kenan, starring Saturday Night Live cast member Kenan Thompson. The series ran for two seasons from 2021 to 2022. Caspe and Clarke worked as the showrunner-executive producers on the Netflix comedy Blockbuster, starring Randall Park, prior to its cancellation.

== Personal life ==
Caspe lives in Los Angeles and is married to actress Casey Wilson. They originally met in early 2010 when Wilson auditioned for his ABC series Happy Endings and after working together on the show for over a year, started dating in July 2011. They got engaged over Labor Day weekend in September 2013 and were married on May 25, 2014, in Ojai, California. They have two sons, Max Red Caspe (born May 2015) and Henry Bear Caspe (born August 24, 2017). In January 2023, David and Casey welcomed their daughter, Frances 'Frankie' Rose Caspe via surrogate.

== Film and television credits ==
- 2011–2013: Happy Endings (creator, executive producer, director – ABC series)
- 2012: That's My Boy (screenwriter)
- 2014: Cuz-Bros (co-creator, executive producer – CBS sitcom pilot)
- 2014: Duty (executive producer – Comedy Central pilot)
- 2014–2015: Marry Me (creator, executive producer – NBC series)
- 2018: Champaign ILL (co-creator, executive producer – YouTube series)
- 2019–2021: Black Monday (co-creator, executive producer – Showtime series)
- 2021–2022: Kenan (co-creator, executive producer – NBC series)
- 2022: Blockbuster (executive producer – Netflix series)
- 2024: Mr. Throwback (co-creator, executive producer – Peacock series)
