= Judy Greer filmography =

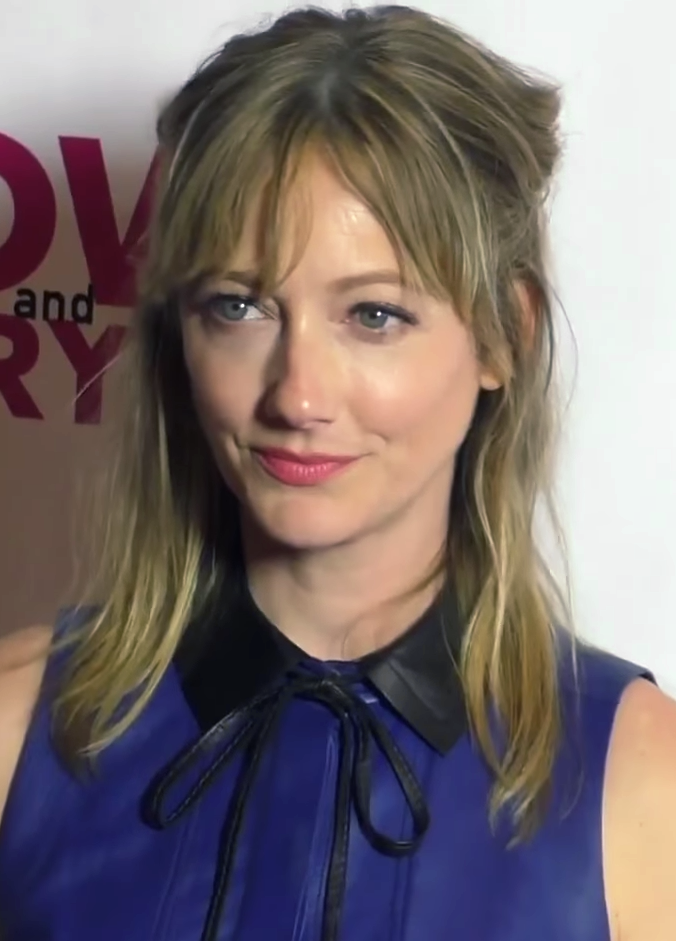
Greer at the premiere of Hedwig And The Angry Inch in 2016

The following is the complete filmography of American actress Judy Greer.

== Film ==
Year	Title	Role	Notes
1997	Stricken	Cynthia	
1998	Kissing a Fool	Andrea	
1999	The Reel	Secretary	Short film
1999	Jawbreaker	Fern Mayo / Vylette	
1999	Three Kings	Cathy Daitch	
1999	The Big Split	Tracy	
2000	What Planet Are You From?	Rebecca	
2000	Sunset Strip	Younger Waitress	
2000	The Specials	Deadly Girl	
2000	Desperate But Not Serious	Molly	
2000	What Women Want	Erin the File Girl	
2001	Audit	Julie Leer	Short film
2001	Without Charlie	Vicky	
2001	The Wedding Planner	Penny Nicholson	
2002	Rules of Love	Maisie	Short film
2002	Adaptation	Alice the Waitress	
2003	The Hebrew Hammer	Esther Bloomembergensteinenthal	
2003	The Cat Returns	Yuki	Voice, English dub
2003	I Love Your Work	Samantha	
2004	13 Going on 30	Lucy Wyman	
2004	The Village	Kitty Walker	
2004	The Last Shot	Girl with Emily French at Movie Premiere	Uncredited
2004	LolliLove	Judy	
2005	Cursed	Joanie	
2005	The Amateurs	Ellie	
2005	The Great New Wonderful	Allison Burbage	Segment: "David and Allison's Story"
2005	In Memory of My Father	Judy	
2005	Elizabethtown	Heather Baylor	
2005	Full Disclosure	Brinn	Short film
2006	American Dreamz	Deborah Accordo	
2006	The TV Set	Alice	
2007	The Go-Getter	Better Than Toast	
2007	The Grand	Sharon Andrews	
2008	27 Dresses	Casey	
2008	Visioneers	Michelle	
2008	Money Game	Cindy	Short film
2009	The Casting Director	The Casting Agent	Short film
2009	Wig	Dr. Almay	Short film
2009	Love Happens	Marty	
2010	Barry Munday	Ginger Farley	
2010	Marmaduke	Debbie Winslow	
2010	Henry's Crime	Debbie Torne	
2010	Peep World	Laura	
2010	Love & Other Drugs	Cindy	
2011	The Key Man	Karen	
2011	The Descendants	Julie Speer	
2011	Jeff, Who Lives at Home	Linda Thompkins	
2012	Republicans, Get in My Vagina	Woman #2	Short film
2012	Playing for Keeps	Barb	
2013	Carrie	Miss Desjardin	
2014	Jamie Marks Is Dead	Lucy	
2014	Judy Greer Is the Best Friend	Herself	Short film
2014	Dawn of the Planet of the Apes	Cornelia	Motion capture
2014	Men, Women & Children	Joan Clint	
2015	Grandma	Olivia	
2015	Addicted to Fresno	Shannon Jackson	
2015	Tomorrowland	Jenny Newton	
2015	Entourage	Casting Director	
2015	Jurassic World	Karen Mitchell	
2015	Ant-Man	Maggie Lang	
2016	All We Had	Patti	
2016	Ordinary World	Christy	
2017	Lemon	Ramona	
2017	Wilson	Shelly	
2017	A Happening of Monumental Proportions	None	Director
2017	War for the Planet of the Apes	Cornelia	Motion capture
2017	Our Souls at Night	Holly Waters	
2017	Adventures in Public School	Claire Heap	
2017	Pottersville	Parker	
2018	The 15:17 to Paris	Joyce Eskel	
2018	Measure of a Man	Lenore Marks	
2018	Ant-Man and the Wasp	Maggie Lang	
2018	Halloween	Karen Nelson	
2018	Driven	Ellen Hoffman	
2018	Preschool in L.A.	Miss Madeline	Short film
2019	Space Buddies	Houston	Short film
2019	Buffaloed	Kathy Dahl	
2019	Where'd You Go, Bernadette	Dr. Janelle Kurtz	
2019	Playing with Fire	Dr. Amy Hicks	
2020	Uncle Frank	Kitty Bledsoe	
2020	Valley Girl	Diana Richman	
2021	Lady of the Manor	Lady Wadsworth	
2021	America: The Motion Picture	Martha Washington	Voice
2021	Halloween Kills	Karen Nelson	
2022	Three Months	Suzanne	
2022	Family Squares	Dorsey Worth	
2022	Hollywood Stargirl	Ana Caraway	
2022	My Father's Dragon	Soda the Whale	Voice
2022	Halloween Ends	Karen Nelson	Archival footage
2023	Guardians of the Galaxy Vol. 3	War Pig (voice)	
2023	Eric Larue	Janice LaRue	
2023	Aporia	Sophie	
2023	Gringa	Mini Marge	
2024	Mabel	Mrs. G	
2024	The Best Christmas Pageant Ever	Grace Bradley	
2025	Dead of Winter	Purple Lady	
2025	The Long Walk	Mrs. Ginnie Garraty	
2026	Chili Finger	Jessica Lipki	
2026	In Memoriam	Chelsea	
TBA	(Saint) Peter †	Carol Blanes	Post-production
TBA	Dinner with Audrey †	Edith Head	Post-production
TBA	The Decline of Fucking Western Civilization †	TBA	Filming
TBA	Cupid †	TBA	Filming

Key
†	Denotes films that have not yet been released

== Television ==
Year	Title	Role	Notes
1997	Early Edition	Cindy	Episode: "Angels and Devils"
1998	Oh Baby	Gail	Episode: "The Hut"
1999	Maggie Winters	Tawny	Episode: "Girls Night Out"
1999–2000	Love & Money	Puff Conklin	13 episodes
2002–2023	Family Guy	Various voices	8 episodes
2003	Just Shoot Me!	Bridget	Episode: "Rivals in Romance"
2003–2005, 2013, 2018	Arrested Development	Kitty Sanchez	13 episodes
2005	CSI: Miami	Pamela Warren	Episode: "Shootout"
2006	Love Monkey	Brandy "Bran" Lowenstein	8 episodes
2006	My Name Is Earl	Maggie Lester	Episode: "Sticks & Stones"
2007, 2011–2015	Two and a Half Men	Myra Melnick / Bridget Schmidt / Danny	13 episodes
2007, 2011	It's Always Sunny in Philadelphia	Ingrid "Fatty Magoo" Nelson	2 episodes
2007–2012	Californication	Trixie	4 episodes
2008	Miss Guided	Becky Freeley	7 episodes
2009	ER	Tildie Mulligan	Episode: "T-Minus-6"
2009	House	Morgan West	Episode: "Here Kitty"
2009	Maneater	Joanne "Gravy" Hardgrave	2 episodes
2009	WordGirl	Desiree Dewey	Voice, Episode: "Robo-Camping/The Stew, the Proud..."
2009–2011	Glenn Martin, DDS	Wendy Park	Voice, 39 episodes
2009–2023	Archer	Cheryl Tunt / Carol Gimble / Cherlene / Mitsuko Miyazumi / Charlotte Stratton (née Vandertunt)	Voice, 145 episodes
2010	Modern Family	Denise	Episode: "Truth Be Told"
2010	The Big Bang Theory	Dr. Elizabeth Plimpton	Episode: "The Plimpton Stimulation"
2010	How I Met Your Mother	Royce	Episode: "The Wedding Bride"
2010	Warren the Ape	Mrs. Hanson	Episode: "Crash Course"
2011	Mad Love	Connie Grabowski	13 episodes
2012	Dan Vs.	Jennifer	Voice, episode: "The Neighbors"
2012	Royal Pains	Veronica Sullivan	Episode: "You Give Love a Bad Name"
2013	Robot Chicken	Dorothy Gale / Jane Jetson	Voice, episode: "Robot Fight Accident"
2014–2015	Married	Lina Bowman	23 episodes
2014	BoJack Horseman	Pam	Voice, episode: "BoJack Hates the Troops"
2015–2016	Masters of Sex	Alice Logan	2 episodes
2015	Comedy Bang! Bang!	Herself	Episode: "Judy Greer Wears a Navy Blouse and Strappy Sandals"
2015	Mom	Michelle	Episode: "Mozzarella Sticks and a Gay Piano Bar"
2016–2019	Ask the StoryBots	Beep	Voice, 21 episodes
2016	StoryBots Super Songs	Beep	Voice, 5 episodes
2017–2018	American Dad!	Various voices	4 episodes
2017	Portlandia	Shawna	Episode: "Separation Anxiety"
2017	Animals.	Ali	Voice, episode: "Humans"
2017	Casual	Judy	8 episodes
2017	I'm Sorry	Maureen	3 episodes
2017	Lady Dynamite	Em Bezzler	Episode: "Hypnopup"
2017	Easy	Gretchen	Episode: "Prodigal Daughter"
2017	Do You Want to See a Dead Body?	Herself	Episode: "A Body and a Breakup"
2017	A StoryBots Christmas	Beep	Voice, television special
2018–2020	Kidding	Jill Piccirillo	20 episodes
2018, 2024	Blaze and the Monster Machines	Baby Gherkin / Lilly	Voice, 3 episodes
2018	Room 104	Darla Andrews	Episode: "Swipe Right"
2018–2022	Let's Go Luna!	Luna	Voice, 65 episodes
2020	Harvey Street Kids	Evil Narwhalla	Voice, episode: "Misadventureland"
2020	Into the Dark	Maggie Glenn	Episode: "Good Boy"
2020	Close Enough	Nikki	Voice, episode: "Room Parents"
2020	The Eric Andre Show	Herself	Episode: "A King is Born"
2021	Calls	Alexis	Voice, episode: "Pedro Across the Street"
2022	The Thing About Pam	Leah Askey	6 episodes
2022	The First Lady	Nancy Howe	4 episodes
2022	Reboot	Bree Marie Jensen	8 episodes
2022–2023	StoryBots: Answer Time	Beep	Voice, 22 episodes
2023	White House Plumbers	Fran Liddy	5 episodes
2024	Super Duper Bunny League	Bex	Episode: "Pilot"
2025	Kiff	Rhonda	Episode: "Cocina Island"
2025–present	Stick	Amber-Linn	5 episodes
2026	The Last Thing He Told Me	Quinn Favreau	6 episodes
2026	The Five-Star Weekend	Electra Undergrove	5 episodes

== Theater ==
Year	Title	Role	Venue	Ref.
2006	Show People	Natalie	Second Stage Theater	
2012	Dead Accounts	Jenny	Music Box Theatre	
