= Andrea Savage =

American actress (born 1973)

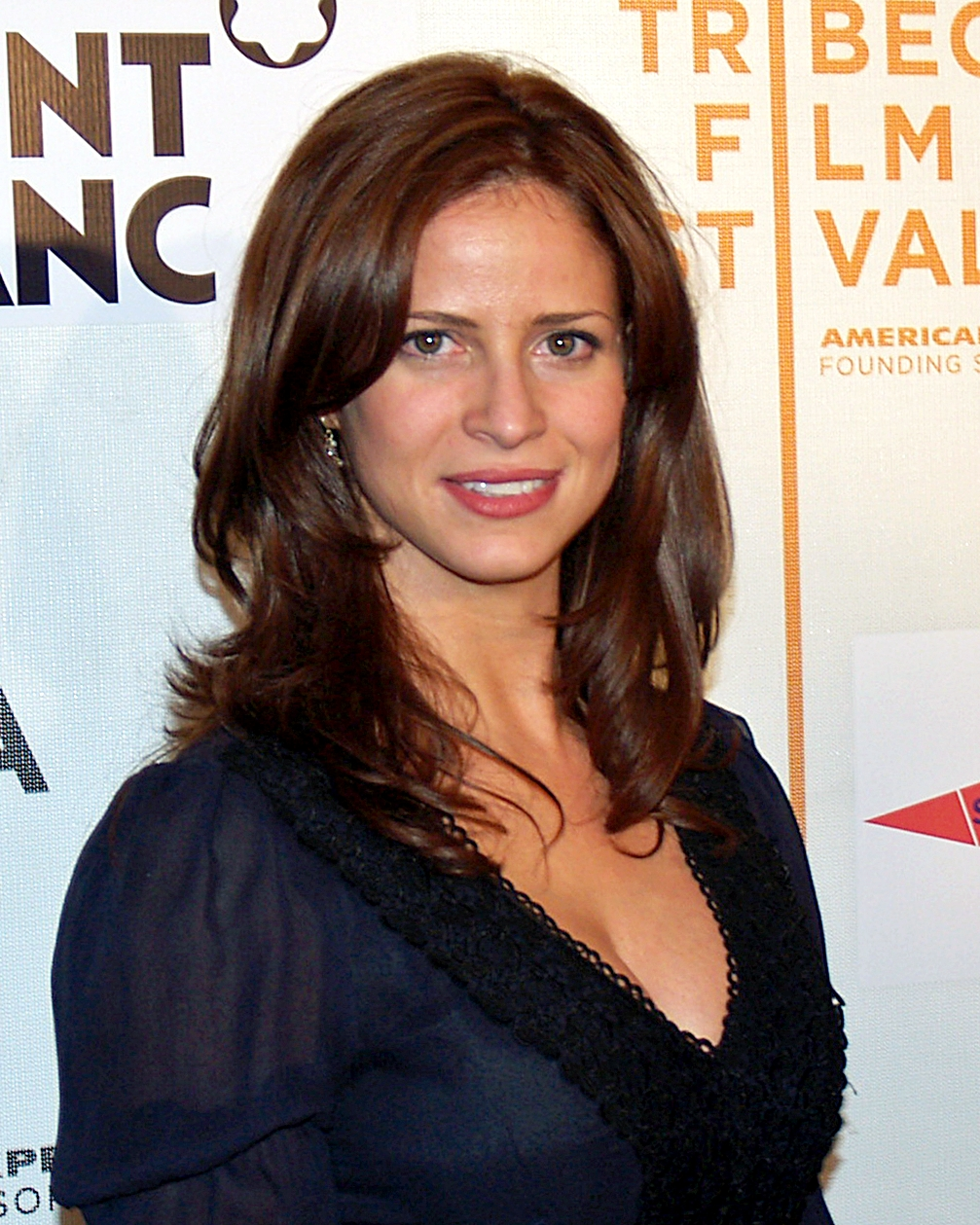
- Savage at the 2007 Tribeca Film Festival
- Born: Andrea Kristen Savage; February 20, 1973 (age 53)
- Education: Cornell University (BA)
- Occupations: Actress, writer, producer
- Years active: 1995–present
- Spouse: Jeremy Plager (2007-2023)
- Children: 1

Andrea Kristen Savage (born February 20, 1973) is an American actress and comedian best known for creating, writing and starring in the show I'm Sorry (2017–2019). The show originally aired on TruTV but became a hit when it streamed on Netflix. In 2022, she starred as Stacy Beale opposite Sylvester Stallone in the series Tulsa King on Paramount+. That same year she also starred in Look Both Ways on Netflix and Beavis and Butt-Head Do the Universe for Paramount+. Savage is also known for roles in projects such as the Comedy Central mockumentary series Dog Bites Man (2006), the comedy film Step Brothers (2008), Hulu's reality TV parody series The Hotwives (2014–2015), and the HBO comedy Veep (2016–2017). She also has appeared in Curb Your Enthusiasm.

== Early life and education ==
In her senior year of high school, she played the title character in Mame. She graduated cum laude from Cornell University with a degree in government and a minor in law studies.

== Career ==
Savage began her acting career playing Renata Vargas, a Brazilian exchange student on Sweet Valley High. Soon after, she joined The Groundlings theater, performing weekly in their company. Savage received starring roles in Significant Others as Chelsea and in Dog Bites Man as Tillie Sullivan. Then, she played the role of Denise in Step Brothers opposite Will Ferrell, following that with a comedy tour with Ferrell, Zach Galifianakis, Demetri Martin, and Nick Swardson. She also appeared with Woody Harrelson in The Grand (2008).

After taking time off to have her child, in 2010, Savage was in the film Dinner for Schmucks. She also filmed two television pilots: The Strip created by Tom Lennon and Ben Garant for NBC, and Wilfred, a dark Australian comedy being redone for FX. In addition, Savage created and starred in a series of shorts for the HBO show Funny or Die Presents about a very pregnant woman trying to engage in some casual sex, as well as a series entitled "Reenactments of Actual Conversations from the Ladies Rooms of Hollywood". She was also seen in the cult hit Party Down for Starz (Savage was originally cast as Casey Klein in the unaired pilot but because she was pregnant, Lizzy Caplan took the role when the show went into production). Soon after, she wrote television pilots for Comedy Central, Fox Studios, and NBC (produced by Jay Roach); as well as the screenplay Girls Weekend for Castle Rock Films. She also filmed opposite Hilary Swank in the film You're Not You. Her directorial debut was in 2012 when she shot her satirical PSA Republicans, Get in My Vagina, which she wrote and also starred in, alongside Kate Beckinsale and Judy Greer. This premiered on Real Time with Bill Maher on HBO and is one of Funny or Die's most successful video shorts of all time.

In 2013, Andrea wrote a TV pilot for ABC/Sony produced by Jamie Tarses, as well as another pilot for Comedy Central, River Dogs, produced by Will Ferrell's Gary Sanchez Productions. She also acted opposite John Leguizamo as "Juicy" in an untitled John Leguizamo pilot for ABC.

Savage's other television credits include starring roles in the FOX pilot Rebounding and Lies & the Wives We Tell Them To on NBC. Additionally, she has recently appeared on other popular comedies such as Modern Family, House of Lies, and The League, and in season 4 of Episodes on Showtime.

Savage also starred alongside Danielle Schneider, Tymberlee Hill, Angela Kinsey, Kristen Schaal, and Casey Wilson in the Hulu original series The Hotwives. The series is a parody of the reality television franchise The Real Housewives on Bravo. Season one (The Hotwives of Orlando) focused on Orlando, while season two (now titled The Hotwives of Vegas) took place in Las Vegas with the same cast playing new characters.

In 2016, she began appearing as Senator (and later President) Laura Montez on Veep, who first appears as the running mate of the titular Veep's opponent, before ultimately becoming president in a complex manipulation of constitutional procedure. That same year she also appeared on Curb Your Enthusiasm opposite Larry David.

In 2017, she created the hit semi-autobiographical TruTV comedy I'm Sorry, in which she also stars. The series premiered on July 12, 2017. Seasons 1 and 2 also aired on Netflix. A planned third season was cancelled due to the COVID-19 pandemic.

In October 2019, she launched a podcast, Andrea Savage: A Grown-Up Woman #buttholes. The podcast has been on hiatus since April 2020.

In 2022, she starred as Stacy Beale, opposite Sylvester Stallone in the series Tulsa King on Paramount+. That same year she also starred in Look Both Ways on Netflix and Beavis and Butt-Head Do the Universe for Paramount+.

== Filmography ==
Film work by Andrea Savage
Year	Title	Role	Notes
2008	The Grand	Renee Jensen	
2008	Step Brothers	Denise	
2009	I Love You, Beth Cooper	Dr. Gleason	
2010	Dinner for Schmucks	Robin	
2011	Life Happens	Patti	
2012	Republicans, Get in My Vagina	Woman #1	Video short
2014	You're Not You	Alyssa	
2015	Sleeping with Other People	Naomi	
2017	The House	Laura	
2018	Summer '03	Shira	
2022	Beavis and Butt-Head Do the Universe	Serena Ryan	Voice role
2022	Look Both Ways	Tina	
2023	You People	Becca	
2024	Chosen Family	Roz	
2025	War of the Worlds	Sheila Jeffries	
2026	Family Movie	TBA	Post-production

Television work by Andrea Savage
Year	Title	Role	Notes
1997	Sweet Valley High	Renata Vargas	Main role (season 4)
1997	Sabrina, the Teenage Witch	Stacey Fink	Episode: "Sabrina Gets Her License: Part 2"
1998	Suddenly Susan	N/A	Episode: "A Funny Thing Happened on the Way to Susan's Party"
1999	Stark Raving Mad	Missy	Episode: "He's Gotta Have It"
2001	Inside Schwartz	Alexa	Episode: "Event Night"
2002	Good Morning, Miami	Cindy	Episode: "The Way to Dylan's Heart"
2002	In-Laws	Sarah	Episode: "Crown Vic"
2003	The West Wing	Heidi Choat	Episode: "Privateers"
2004	Significant Others	Chelsea	Main role
2004–2005	The King of Queens	Kate	2 episodes
2005	Cold Case	Lindsay (1982)	Episode: "Schadenfreude"
2005	Stacked	Barbara	Episode: "A Fan for All Seasons"
2006	Dog Bites Man	Tillie Sullivan	Main role
2007	Two and a Half Men	Lena	Episode: "Mr. McGlue's Feedbag"
2007	The Winner	Donna	Episode: "What Happens in Albany, Stays in Albany"
2008	The Cleaner	Nicole	Episodes: "Let It Ride", "Rebecca"
2009	Glenn Martin DDS	Kid	Voice role; episode: "A Bromantic Getaway"
2010	The Strip	Jackie	TV movie
2010	Party Down	Annie LeGros	Episode: "Precious Lights Pre-School Auction"
2010–2011	Funny or Die Presents	various	Recurring role, 7 episodes; also writer, 3 episodes
2011	Modern Family	Holly	Episode: "Go Bullfrogs!"
2011	The Life & Times of Tim	Nurse	Voice role; episode: "Percey Davis Boulevard/Cool Uncle Stu Balls"
2012	The Life & Times of Tim	Julie	Voice role; 3 episodes
2012	House of Lies	Brenda	Episode: "Bareback Town"
2012–2014	The League	Gail	2 episodes
2013	Newsreaders	Dr. Valerie Vesser	Episode: "Pubic Hair Crisis"
2014	Kroll Show	Julie Francois	Episode: "#canadiansafesex"
2014	American Dad!	Voice over in a beer commercial	Voice role; episode: "News Glances with Genevieve Vavance"
2014–2015	The Hotwives	Veronica Von Vandervon / Ivanka Silversan	Main role
2015–2017	Episodes	Helen Basch	Recurring role (seasons 4–5)
2015	Comedy Bang! Bang!	Samantha	Episode: "Karen Gillan Wears a Black and White Striped Pullover and Coral Skirt"
2016–2017	iZombie	Vivian Stoll	Recurring role (seasons 2–3)
2016–2017	Veep	Senator / President Laura Montez	Recurring role (seasons 5–7), 7 episodes
2016	Drunk History	Addie Cherry	Episode: "Shit Shows"
2017–2019	I'm Sorry	Andrea Warren	Main role; also creator
2017	Curb Your Enthusiasm	Rhonda	Episode: "The Accidental Text on Purpose"
2018	Bob's Burgers	Claire	Voice role; episode: "Mo Mommy, Mo Problems"
2020	Make It Work!	Herself	Television special
2021	Nailed It!	Herself	Episode: "An Ungodly Mess"
2021	The Freak Brothers	Harper Switzer	Main role
2021	The Goldbergs	Dean Martin	Episode: "Horse Play"
2022–2024	Tulsa King	Stacy Beale	11 episodes
2022	The Great North	Chief Elba	Voice role; episode: "Say It Again, Ham Adventure"
2026	Life, Larry and the Pursuit of Unhappiness	Cordelia	Episode: "Deepthroat"
