= Kate Beckinsale =

English actress (born 1973)

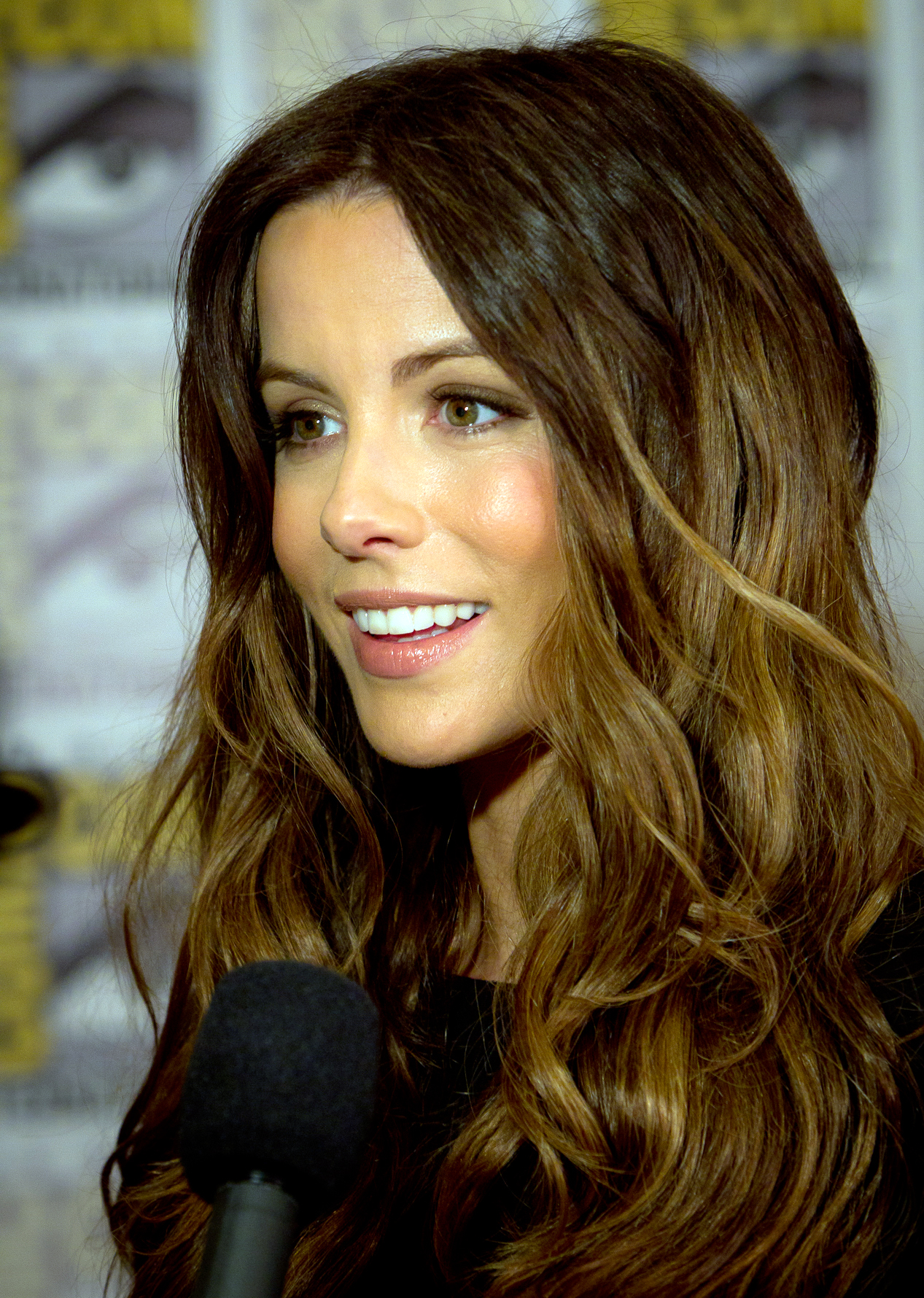
- Beckinsale in 2011
- Born: Kathrin Romany Beckinsale; 26 July 1973 (age 53); London, England
- Occupation: Actress
- Years active: 1991–present
- Spouse: Len Wiseman (m. 2004; div. 2019)
- Partner: Michael Sheen (1995–2003)
- Children: 1
- Parents: Richard Beckinsale (father); Judy Loe (mother)
- Relatives: Samantha Beckinsale (half-sister); Roy Battersby (stepfather)

Kathrin Romany Beckinsale (born 26 July 1973) is an English actress. The only child of the actors Richard Beckinsale and Judy Loe, she debuted in the series premiere of the 1975 daytime drama Couples.

In 1993, she made her theatrical film debut with a role in Kenneth Branagh's adaptation Much Ado About Nothing whilst studying at the University of Oxford. She played leading roles in numerous British costume dramas such as Prince of Jutland (1994), Cold Comfort Farm (1995) and Emma (1996). She also starred in Pearl Harbor (2001) and Serendipity (2001).

A starring role as Selene in the Underworld film series (2003–2016) propelled Beckinsale into action movies and starring roles in bigger budget films. Major releases have included The Aviator (2004), Van Helsing (2004), and Total Recall (2012). Beckinsale has continued to earn praise for her roles in small-scale dramas such as Snow Angels (2007), Love & Friendship (2016), and The Only Living Boy in New York (2017). She returned to television in the limited series The Widow (2019).

== Early life and education ==
Kathrin Romany Beckinsale was born on 26 July 1973 in Isleworth, London. She is the only child of actors Richard Beckinsale and Judy Loe. Her half-sister from her father's earlier marriage is actress Samantha Beckinsale. Her father was partly of Burmese descent.

Her parents did not marry until 1977, prior to Beckinsale starting nursery school. She made her first television appearance at age four, in an episode of This Is Your Life, dedicated to her father. When she was five, her father died suddenly of a heart attack, at age 31. She was deeply traumatised by the loss and "started expecting bad things to happen".

Her widowed mother moved in with director Roy Battersby when Beckinsale was nine, and she was brought up alongside his four sons and daughter. She had a close relationship with her stepfather, who was a member of the Workers Revolutionary Party during her youth. As a little girl, she helped to sell The News Line, a Trotskyist newspaper. She has said the household phone was tapped following Battersby's blacklisting by the BBC. Family friends included Ken Loach and Vanessa Redgrave.

Beckinsale was educated at Godolphin and Latymer School, an independent school for girls in Hammersmith, West London. She was involved with the Orange Tree Youth Theatre. She was twice a winner of the WH Smith Young Writers Award for both fiction and poetry.

She has described herself as a "late bloomer": "All of my friends were kissing boys and drinking cider way before me. I found it really depressing that we weren't making camp fires and everyone was doing stuff like that." At the age of 15, she had a nervous breakdown and developed anorexia. She underwent Freudian psychoanalysis for four years.

Beckinsale studied Russian at school and read French and Russian literature at New College, Oxford; she was later described by her contemporary Victoria Coren Mitchell, as "whip-clever, slightly nuts, and very charming." She became friends with Roy Kinnear's daughter Kirsty. She was involved with the Oxford University Dramatic Society, most notably being directed by fellow student Tom Hooper in a production of A View from the Bridge at the Oxford Playhouse. As a Modern Languages student, she was required to spend her third year abroad, and studied in Paris. She quit university to focus on her burgeoning acting career: "It was getting to the point where I wasn't enjoying either thing enough because both were very high pressure." Beckinsale has said she would like to complete her studies at the University of Oxford.

When Beckinsale was fifty-one, her mother died of stage-four cancer, aged 78. Beckinsale said: "She died the night of July 15 in my arms after immeasurable suffering."

== Career ==
=== 1991–1997: Early acting roles ===
Beckinsale decided at a young age she wanted to be an actress: "I grew up immersed in film. My family were in the business. I quickly realised that my parents seemed to have much more fun in their work than any of my friends' parents." She was inspired by the performances of Jeanne Moreau. She made her television debut in 1991 with a small part in an ITV adaptation of P. D. James' Devices and Desires. In 1992, she starred alongside Christopher Eccleston in "Rachel's Dream," a 30‑minute Channel 4 short. In 1993, she appeared in the pilot of the ITV detective series, Anna Lee, starring Imogen Stubbs.

In 1993, Beckinsale landed the role of Hero in Kenneth Branagh's big-screen adaptation of Much Ado About Nothing. It was filmed in Tuscany, Italy, during a summer holiday from the University of Oxford. She attended the film's Cannes Film Festival premiere and remembered it as an overwhelming experience. "Nobody even told me I could bring a friend!" "I had Doc Martens boots on, and I think I put the flower from the breakfast tray in my hair." Peter Travers of Rolling Stone was won over by her "lovely" performance. Vincent Canby of The New York Times noted that she and Robert Sean Leonard "look right and behave with a certain naive sincerity, although they often seem numb with surprise at hearing the complex locutions they speak." The film grossed over $22 million at the box office.

She made three other films while at university. In 1994, she appeared as Christian Bale's love interest in Prince of Jutland, a film based on the Danish legend which inspired Shakespeare's Hamlet, and starred in the murder mystery Uncovered. In 1995, while studying in Paris, she filmed the French language Marie-Louise ou la permission.

Shortly after leaving Oxford University in 1995, Beckinsale starred in Cold Comfort Farm, as Flora Poste, a newly orphaned 1930s socialite sent to live with distant family members in rural England. The John Schlesinger-directed film was an adaptation of Stella Gibbons's novel and also featured Joanna Lumley, Eileen Atkins, Ian McKellen, Rufus Sewell and Stephen Fry. Beckinsale was initially considered too young, but was cast after she wrote a pleading letter to the director. Emanuel Levy of Variety was reminded of "the strength of a young Glenda Jackson and the charm of a young Julie Christie." Kevin Thomas of the Los Angeles Times classed the actress as "yet another of those effortlessly skilled British beauties who light up the screen." Janet Maslin of The New York Times felt she played the role "with the perfect snippy aplomb." The film grossed over $5 million at the US box office.

Also in 1995, she appeared in Haunted, a ghost story in which Derek Elley of Variety felt she "holds the screen, with both physical looks and verbal poise." 1995 saw Beckinsale's first professional stage appearance, as Nina in The Seagull at Theatre Royal, Bath. She became romantically involved with costar Michael Sheen after meeting during play rehearsals. She later said: "I was all revved up to feel very intimidated. It was my first-ever play and my mother had cut out reviews of him in previous productions. And then he walked in ... It was almost like, 'God, well, I'm finished now. That's it, then.'... He's the most outrageously talented person I've ever met." Irving Wardle of The Independent felt that "the casting, including Michael Sheen's volcanic Kostya and Kate Beckinsale's steadily freezing Nina, is mainly spot-on." In early 1996, she starred in two further plays, Sweetheart at the Royal Court Theatre and Clocks and Whistles at the Bush Theatre.

Beckinsale next starred in an ITV adaptation of Jane Austen's Emma, playing Emma to Mark Strong's Mr Knightley and Samantha Morton's Harriet Smith. "You shouldn't necessarily like Emma," Beckinsale has said of her character. "You do love her, but in the way the family of a young girl could be exasperated by her outrageous behaviour and still love her." The programme was aired in autumn 1996, just months after Gwyneth Paltrow had starred in a film adaptation of the same story. Caryn James of The New York Times felt that while "Ms. Beckinsale's Emma is plainer looking than Ms. Paltrow's," she is "altogether more believable and funnier." Jonathan Brown of The Independent has described Beckinsale's interpretation as "the most enduring modern performance" as Emma.

In 1997, Beckinsale appeared opposite Stuart Townsend in the comedy Shooting Fish, one of the most commercially successful British films of that year. "I'd just had my wisdom teeth out," Beckinsale later recalled of the initial audition. "I was also on very strong painkillers, so it was not the most conventional of meetings." Elley wrote of "an incredibly laid-back performance." Thomas felt she "just glows as an aristocrat facing disaster with considerable aplomb." She narrated Austen's Emma for Hodder & Stoughton AudioBooks and Diana Hendry's "The Proposal" for BBC Radio 4. Also in 1997, she played Juliet to Michael Sheen's Romeo, in an audio production of Romeo and Juliet, directed by Sheen.

In Beckinsale's last film before her move to the US, she starred as Alice in Channel 4's Alice Through the Looking-Glass, released in July 1998.

=== 1998–2002: Move to Hollywood ===
At this point in her career, Beckinsale began to seek work in the United States, something she has said wasn't "a conscious decision... My boyfriend was in a play on Broadway so that's why we ended up in New York, and my auditions happened to be for American films." She starred opposite Chloë Sevigny in 1998's The Last Days of Disco. The Whit Stillman film focused on a group of mostly Ivy League and Hampshire College graduates socialising in the Manhattan disco scene of the early 1980s. Beckinsale's American accent was widely praised. Kenneth Turan of the Los Angeles Times felt her role as the bossy Charlotte was "beautifully played." Todd McCarthy of Variety was unimpressed by the film but noted that "compensations include Beckinsale, looking incredible in a succession of black dresses, whose character can get on your nerves even if the actress doesn't." Her performance earned her a London Critics' Circle Film Award. The film grossed $3 million worldwide.

In 1999, Beckinsale appeared opposite Claire Danes in Brokedown Palace, a drama about two young Americans forced to deal with the Thai justice system on a post-graduation trip abroad. A then 26-year-old Beckinsale played a young girl. Danes had hoped to become friends with Beckinsale during the shoot but found her "complicated" and "prickly." McCarthy said the leads "confirm their status as two of the young actresses on the scene today most worth watching," finding Beckinsale "very effective at getting across layered character traits and emotions." "Danes and Beckinsale are exceptionally talented young actresses," said Thomas, but "unfortunately, the script's seriously underdeveloped context defeats their considerable efforts at every turn." Stephen Holden of The New York Times felt that Beckinsale's character "never comes into focus." The film was a box office failure.

2000's The Golden Bowl marked Beckinsale's first role following the birth of her daughter. The Merchant/Ivory production was based on the novel by Henry James and also starred Uma Thurman and Jeremy Northam. Beckinsale's partner, Michael Sheen, hit Northam on the film set after he followed Beckinsale to her trailer to scold her for forgetting a line. Holden noted "the most satisfying of the four-lead performances belong to the British cast members, Ms. Beckinsale and Mr. Northam, who are better than their American counterparts at layers of emotional concealment," adding each beat of Beckinsale's performance "registers precisely." Thomas felt her performance would take her to "a new career level." Andrew Sarris of The New York Observer asserted that she "comes close to capturing the sublimity of Maggie, despite the obvious fact that no movie can capture the elegant copiousness of James' prose." The film grossed over $5 million worldwide.

Beckinsale rose to fame in 2001 with a leading role in the war film Pearl Harbor, as a nurse torn between two pilots, played by Ben Affleck and Josh Hartnett. She was drawn to the project by the script: "It's so unusual these days to read a script that has those old-fashioned values to it. Not morals, but movie values. It's a big, sweeping epic....You just never get the chance to do that." Director Michael Bay initially had doubts about casting the actress: "I wasn't sure about her at first...she wore black leather trousers in her screen test and I thought she was a little nasty...it was easy to think of this woman as a slut." He eventually decided to hire her because she wasn't "too beautiful. Women feel disturbed when they see someone's too pretty." He asked her to lose weight during filming.

In a 2004 interview, the actress noted that his comments were "upsetting" and said she wore leather trousers because "it was snowing out. It wasn't exactly like I had my nipple rings in." She felt grateful that she had not had to deal with such criticism at a younger age: "If I had come on to a movie set at [a younger] age and someone had said, 'You're a bit funny-looking, can you go on a diet?' – I might have jumped off a building. I just didn't have the confidence to put that into perspective at the time." However, speaking in 2011, she said she was "very fond" of Bay.

Pearl Harbor received negative reviews. Owen Gleiberman of Entertainment Weekly praised "the avid eyed, ruby lipped Kate Beckinsale, the rare actress whose intelligence gives her a sensual bloom; she's like Parker Posey without irony." A. O. Scott of The New York Times noted that "Mr. Affleck and Ms. Beckinsale do what they can with their lines, and glow with the satiny shine of real movie stars." However, Mike Clark of USA Today felt that the "usually appealing Kate Beckinsale" is "inexplicably submerged – like her hospital colleagues – under heaps of tarty makeup that even actresses of the era didn't wear." The film was a commercial success, grossing $449 million worldwide.

Beckinsale's second film appearance of 2001 was in the romantic comedy Serendipity, as the love interest of John Cusack. It was filmed directly after Pearl Harbor and Beckinsale found it "a real relief to return to something slightly more familiar." Turan praised the "appealing and believable" leads, adding that Beckinsale "reinforces the strong impression she made in Cold Comfort Farm, The Golden Bowl, and The Last Days of Disco" after "recovering nicely" from her appearance in the much-maligned Pearl Harbor. Claudia Puig of USA Today felt that "Beckinsale's talents haven't been mined as effectively in any other film since Cold Comfort Farm." McCarthy found her "energetic and appealing." Elvis Mitchell of The New York Times described her as "luminous but determined." In an uncomplimentary review of the film, Roger Ebert described her as "a good actress, but not good enough to play this dumb." The film grossed over $77 million at the worldwide box office.

In 2002, Beckinsale starred in Lisa Cholodenko's Laurel Canyon, as a strait-laced academic who finds herself increasingly attracted to her free-spirited future mother-in-law. The independent film was another opportunity for Beckinsale to work with Christian Bale, her Prince of Jutland co‑star. She found their sex scene awkward because she knew Bale well: "If it was a stranger, it would have been easier." While Frances McDormand's performance as Bale's mother was widely praised, Beckinsale received negative reviews. Holden found the film "superbly acted, with the exception of Ms. Beckinsale, whose tense, colourless Alex conveys no inner life." Critic Lisa Schwarzbaum was unimpressed by the "tedious" characters and criticised "the fussy performances of Bale and Beckinsale" in particular. The film grossed over $4 million worldwide.

=== 2003–2006: Action roles ===
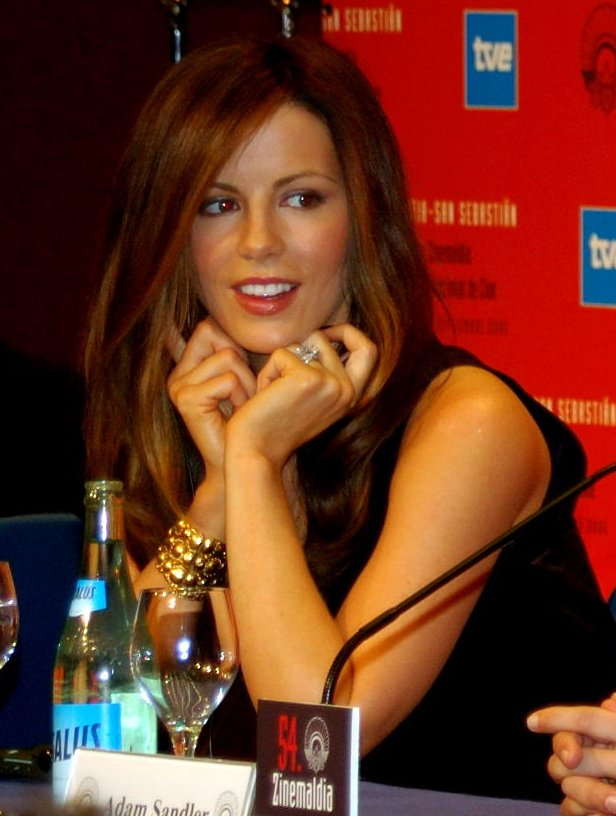
Beckinsale at the 53rd San Sebastián International Film Festival, 2005

Beckinsale became known as an action star after playing a vampire in 2003's Underworld. The film was markedly different from her previous work, and Beckinsale has said she was grateful for the change of pace after appearing in "a bunch of period stuff and then a bunch of romantic comedies," adding that "It was quite a challenge for me to play an action heroine and pull off all that training when [in real life] I can't catch a ball if it's coming my way." The film received negative to mixed reviews but was a surprise box-office hit and has gained a cult following. Also in 2003, she starred in the little seen Tiptoes with Gary Oldman and Matthew McConaughey.

In 2004, Beckinsale starred in the action horror film Van Helsing. She was "so surprised" to be appearing in her second action film in two years. "It just seemed like a very good role." Beckinsale had just separated from her long-term boyfriend Michael Sheen at the time of filming and appreciated the warm atmosphere created on set by director Stephen Sommers and co‑star Hugh Jackman: "I really did find that working with people like Stephen and Hugh made it possible to get through what I was going through." The film grossed over $120 million at the US box office and over $300 million worldwide, but it was not well-reviewed. Mick LaSalle of the San Francisco Chronicle described her as "a pretty actress doing her best to maintain dignity, vainly trying to craft a feminist statement from a filmmaker's whimsy." Rex Reed of The New York Observer felt she was "desperately in need of a new agent."

Also in 2004, Beckinsale portrayed Ava Gardner in Martin Scorsese's Howard Hughes biopic The Aviator. Scorsese decided to cast Beckinsale because, "I've always liked her. I've seen all her work, and I was glad that she agreed to audition." Beckinsale's performance received mixed reviews. Ken Tucker of New York Magazine said she played the part "in full va-va-voom blossom." LaSalle felt that she manages "to convince us that Ava was one of the great broads of all time." However, Clark described it as "the one performance that doesn't come off (though Beckinsale has the requisite beauty)." Peter Bradshaw of The Guardian stated that "Gardner's rich, voluptuous sexiness is completely absent as Beckinsale sleepwalks through the role as if she was advertising perfume." The film grossed over $213 million worldwide.

In 2006, Beckinsale reprised her role as Selene in the successful vampire sequel Underworld: Evolution, directed by her husband, Len Wiseman. It was the first time she had "been involved with a movie from the moment it's a germ of an idea right through the whole editing process." Her daughter had a small role as the younger Selene. The film was a box office success, grossing $111 million worldwide. Beckinsale's second film appearance of 2006 was opposite Adam Sandler and Christopher Walken in Click, a comedy about an overworked family man who discovers a magical remote control that allows him to control time. The opportunity to play a mother "was one of the things that was attractive to me" about the part. It was highly profitable, grossing $237 million worldwide against a production budget of $82.5 million.

=== 2007–2008: Focus on small-scale drama ===
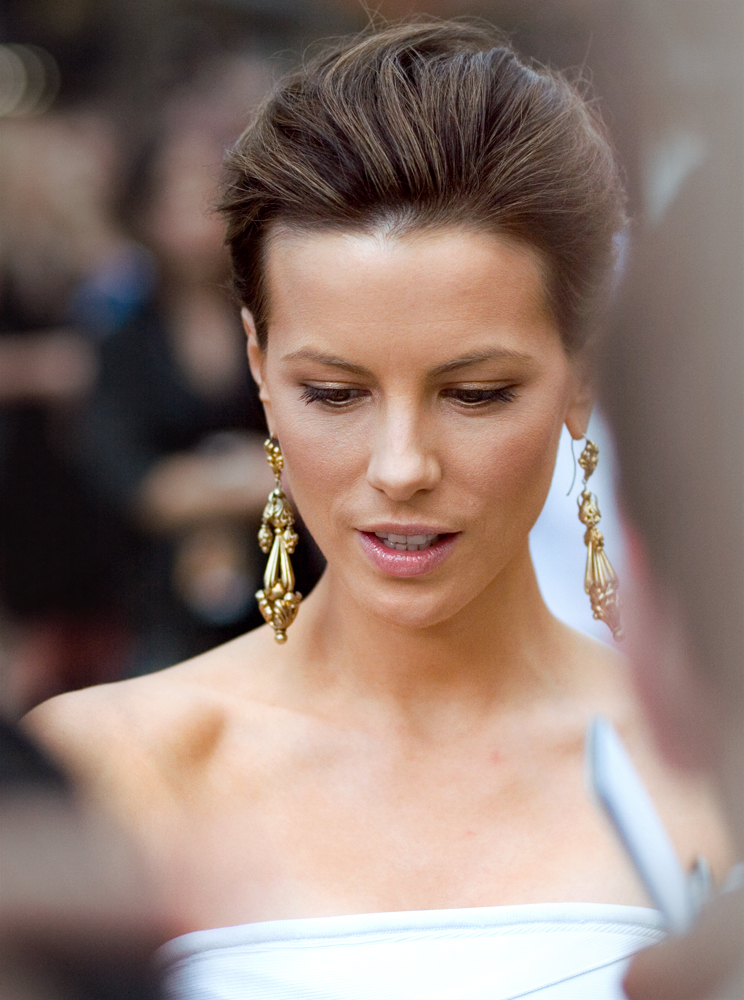
Beckinsale at the London premiere of Live Free or Die Hard, June 2007

Beckinsale then made a return to smaller-scale projects: "My experience is that I sort of stepped away from the independent movies and did a couple of big movies. But that's not necessarily how it's perceived by everybody else, which I do understand." "I enjoy an action movie as much as the next person [but] it's not something that I would like to do solely." She explained that she had originally decided to appear in Underworld because she felt typecast in classical roles – it was "assumed that I use a chamber pot and wear bloomers" – but that her action career "kind of took off a little too much."

In 2007, Beckinsale starred opposite Sam Rockwell in the independent drama Snow Angels, based on the novel by Stewart O'Nan. The harrowing film, in which she played an overwhelmed single mother, put Beckinsale "in kind of a tough place." "I did have my kid, my husband and, in fact, my ex was around a lot, so it was very nice to come home to my people whom I love." Puig felt "Beckinsale gives her best performance in years." Richard Corliss of Time described it as "her sharpest work yet." However, Scott felt that "her skill and discipline cannot overcome the sense that she is an exotic species transplanted into this grim ecosystem. Hard as she works to convince us otherwise, it's a stretch to believe that a woman with the kind of poised confidence in her own beauty she manifests would wind up with an underachieving mouth breather like Glenn." The film grossed solely $414,404 worldwide.

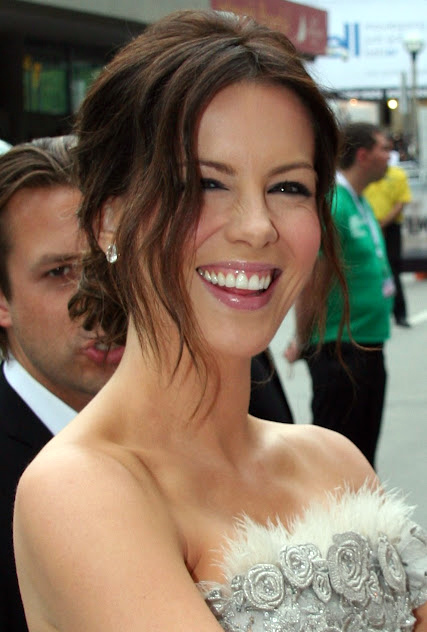
Beckinsale at the 2008 Toronto International Film Festival

Also in 2007, Beckinsale appeared alongside Luke Wilson in Vacancy, a thriller set in an isolated motel. Sarah Jessica Parker was originally cast in the part, but she dropped out before filming began. Bradshaw felt "Wilson and Beckinsale have the chops for scary movies." Gleiberman noted "Luke Wilson, with his hangdog defensive mopiness, and Kate Beckinsale, all sexy severity, are ideally matched as a couple who hate each other." However, Manohla Dargis of The New York Times was unimpressed, referring to Beckinsale as "the reigning queen of the bland B's." The film was profitable, grossing $35 million worldwide against a production budget of $19 million.

In 2008, Beckinsale appeared in Winged Creatures, a film about how six different witnesses cope with the aftermath of a shooting. Beckinsale played a waitressing single mother in an ensemble cast which included Dakota Fanning, Jennifer Hudson, and Forest Whitaker. "It was a really, really nice experience but it was quick," said Beckinsale of the filming process. "I just felt a bit like I was shot through a cannon." Betsy Sharkey of the Los Angeles Times felt she played the role "with a white trash verve" and found her character's "raw ache for that someone with money and respectability is palpable." However, Dargis felt that Beckinsale and her cast mates have a "tough time filling out characters that are at best abstractions of grief and often just clichés." The film received a very limited theatrical release in New York and Los Angeles; it was released simultaneously on DVD.

Also in 2008, Beckinsale starred in Nothing but the Truth, as a journalist who refuses to reveal her source. The film, co‑starring Vera Farmiga and Matt Dillon, was inspired by the case of Judith Miller. As part of her research for the role, "I spent some time at The L.A. Times with some female reporters, and I spoke to Judith Miller about her experience....I really researched the hell out of that one and it was an amazingly fulfilling, brilliant experience." Ann Hornaday of The Washington Post asserted that Beckinsale and Farmiga played "two of the most fascinating female movie characters to hit screens in a long while, and they've been brought to life by two gifted actresses, each working at the top of her game." Beckinsale received a Critic's Choice Award nomination for her performance. The film never received a full theatrical release after the distributor filed for bankruptcy and the film grossed solely $186,702 worldwide. "I have prayed – prayed – for film companies to go bankrupt on films I've made, and then this happens on the one I love," said Beckinsale. "Usually it's the ones you're most embarrassed about that are on the side of every bus."

=== 2009–2015: Return to action films ===
In 2009, Beckinsale starred in the comic-book adaption Whiteout, as a US Marshal tasked with investigating a murder in Antarctica. It was filmed in Manitoba, Canada. She found the action scenes less physically demanding than those in Underworld because "three pairs of trousers and a parka gives you a bit more protection than the latex suit." The film was critically panned and a box office failure, failing to recoup its budget. With critics consensus: Beckinsale is as lovely as ever, and does her best with the material, but moribund pacing and an uninspired plot leave Whiteout in the cold. She also made a brief cameo in the prequel Underworld: Rise of the Lycans; she appeared in flashforwards composed of footage from 2003's Underworld.

Also in 2009, Beckinsale starred in the family drama Everybody's Fine alongside Robert De Niro, Drew Barrymore, and Rockwell, her Snow Angels costar. Beckinsale was excited by the opportunity to work with De Niro, whom she had first encountered "years and years ago when I just had Lily and he was putting together a reading of The Good Shepherd.." Everybody's Fine was a box office flop, failing to recoup its production budget. In May 2010, Beckinsale sat on the nine-member 2010 Cannes Film Festival jury, chaired by director Tim Burton. Unable to find a script she felt passionate about, Beckinsale kept a low profile in 2010 and 2011, opting to spend time with her daughter.

Beckinsale returned to acting in 2012 with appearances in three action films. Beckinsale first appeared in the action thriller Contraband. She had a supporting role as the wife of Mark Wahlberg's character, a former criminal who gets forced back into a life of crime after his family members are threatened. The film was directed by Baltasar Kormákur, who also starred in the Icelandic language version of the film, Reykjavík-Rotterdam. The San Francisco Chronicle felt Beckinsale was "stuck in a bit of a thankless role as the victimised wife, but she does try to infuse a harder edge to the character." The Hollywood Reporter stated that "Beckinsale, her innate classiness calibrated down a few notches, has little to do but be supportive, worried and, eventually, besieged." Entertainment Weekly felt that the "woman-in-peril stuff is second-rate, giving off a whiff of exploitation" while Variety found the repeated violence towards Beckinsale's character disturbing. The film had a production budget of $25 million and grossed over $96 million worldwide.

Beckinsale next reprised her role as Selene in the fourth instalment of the vampire franchise Underworld: Awakening. The franchise was initially conceived of as a trilogy and Beckinsale was not "intending to do another one" but was convinced by the quality of the script. The Hollywood Reporter noted that "when she's not actually fighting, her performance consists of little more than striding purposefully toward or away from the camera." The Los Angeles Times remarked that she "finally manages to perfect the monotone delivery she'd been honing for the series' first two entries." The film had a production budget of $70 million and grossed over $160 million worldwide.

Also in 2012, Beckinsale appeared as the wife of a factory worker in the sci-fi action remake Total Recall, directed by her husband Len Wiseman. She has said Wiseman joined the project because he was unable to receive studio financing for an original sci-fi idea: "You're constantly finding yourself having to defend doing a remake when you didn't really want to make one in the first place." The film received mainly negative reviews. Variety found her performance "one-note" while The Hollywood Reporter described her as "one-dimensional." USA Today remarked that she "spends much of the movie strutting down hallways and looking relentlessly, though blandly, nasty." The film grossed $198 million against a production budget of over $125 million.

In 2013, Beckinsale starred in the legal thriller The Trials of Cate McCall opposite Nick Nolte and James Cromwell. The film received negative reviews and was released as a Lifetime movie. She next appeared in the little-seen psychological thriller Stonehearst Asylum, loosely based on Edgar Allan Poe's short story "The System of Doctor Tarr and Professor Fether." A lukewarm critical reception greeted the film upon its DVD release; Jeannette Catsoulis of The New York Times said Beckinsale was "emoting as if an Oscar nomination depended on it" while Dennis Harvey of Variety found her performance "overwrought." In 2014, she provided the voice for Queen Ayrenn, a character in The Elder Scrolls Online video game.

Also in 2014, Beckinsale starred in the psychological thriller The Face of an Angel alongside Daniel Brühl. The film, directed by Michael Winterbottom, was inspired by the case of Meredith Kercher. Jesse Hassenger of The A.V. Club felt her "charismatic" performance was wasted. Also in 2015, she starred alongside Simon Pegg in the poorly received British comedy Absolutely Anything, as an author agency employee and the love interest of a man (Pegg) chosen by four aliens to do anything he wants. Tom Huddleston of Time Out said her character "is never really developed – which is perhaps a blessing, because her cut-glass-posh performance is almost as grating as Pegg's." A fan of Monty Python growing up, in 2014 Beckinsale appeared on the fourth episode of Monty Python's Best Bits (Mostly) where she spoke of her favourite Python comedy sketch.

=== 2016–present: Love & Friendship and beyond ===
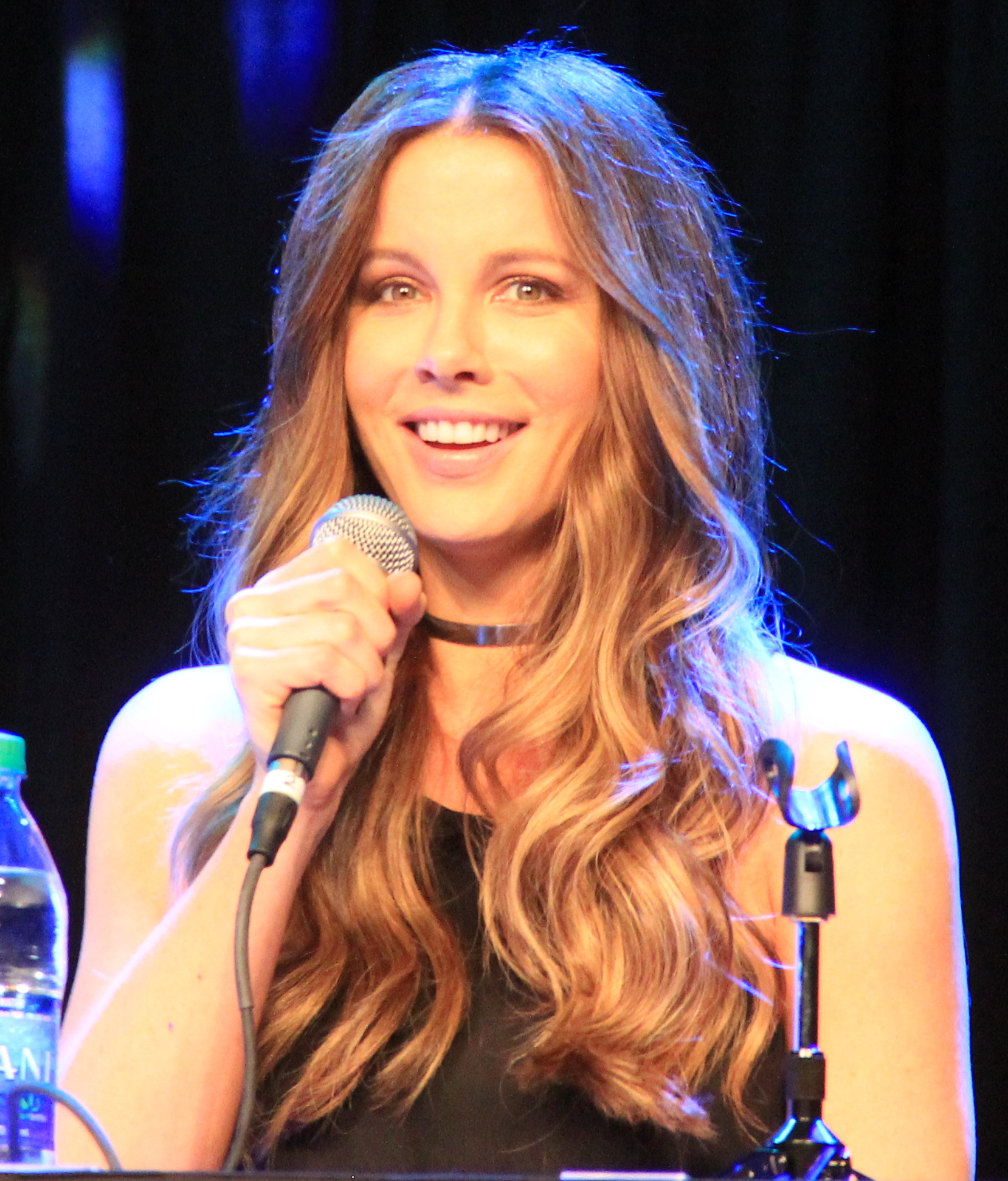
Beckinsale at Comicpalooza 2016

In the 2016 romantic comedy Love & Friendship, which premiered at the Sundance Film Festival, Beckinsale reunited with her Last Days of Disco collaborators Stillman and Sevigny. Based on Jane Austen's Lady Susan, the film revolved around her role as the title character, a wry and calculating widow, as she pursues a wealthy and hapless man for marriage originally intended for her daughter, though she eventually marries him herself. The film was universally acclaimed by critics and found commercial success in arthouse cinemas. Justin Chang of Variety described the role as "one of the most satisfying screen roles of her career [...] Beckinsale magnetizes the screen in a way that naturally underscores how far ahead of everyone else she is: an effect that doesn't always work to the movie's advantage." Todd McCarthy of The Hollywood Reporter remarked, "There aren't great depths to the role, but Beckinsale excels with the long speeches and in defining her character as a very self-aware egoist."

Also in the year, she starred in the horror film The Disappointments Room, opposite Mel Raido, both playing a couple in a new house that contains a hidden room with a haunted past. The film was heavily panned by critics and flopped at the box office; it only made $1.4 million in its opening weekend, and a total of $2.4 million in North America. Christian Holub of Entertainment Weekly concluded that "[m]ost of the film is just Beckinsale walking around looking worried," while Joe Leydon of Variety found her "credible and compelling [...] except for when she's trying way too hard in a rather unfortunate scene that calls for drunken ranting." In late 2016, Beckinsale returned as Selene in the fifth instalment of the Underworld franchise, Underworld: Blood Wars, which grossed $81.1 million worldwide.

Beckinsale starred opposite Pierce Brosnan, Callum Turner, and Jeff Bridges in Marc Webb's romantic coming-of-age drama The Only Living Boy in New York (2017), as a book editor and the mistress of a publisher whose son sees his life upended. Reviews of the film were mediocre, while it found a limited audience in theatres. The A.V. Club found Brosnan and Beckinsale to be "vastly more interesting by the twin virtues of not disguising their voices and fitting so poorly into the sad-faced melodrama this movie wants to be." She is attached to star in an adaptation of The Chocolate Money by Ashley Prentice Norton, with a screenplay by Emma Forrest. In 2018, Beckinsale starred as Ingrid Carpenter in the British film Farming.

Beckinsale starred in the ITV/Amazon Prime drama The Widow (2019), her first TV series for more than 20 years. The series stars Beckinsale as an Englishwoman who believes her husband, killed in a plane crash three years prior, is still alive in the Congo. Beckinsale starred in the American action comedy film Jolt alongside Bobby Cannavale, Laverne Cox, Stanley Tucci and Jai Courtney. Jolt was adapted from a screenplay by Scott Wascha and directed by Tanya Wexler and released by Amazon Studios on 23 July 2021. That same year she starred in the Paramount+ dark comedy streaming television Guilty Party. In that series, she served as executive producer as well.

In 2021, Deadline announced that Beckinsale would star in the Catherine Hardwicke-directed family drama Prisoner's Daughter. In 2026, The Hollywood Reporter reported that she would star in the upcoming killer shark film White, from director Jake West, which is now in post-production.

=== Modelling ===
Labelled an "English rose" by the BBC as early as 2001, Beckinsale has worked occasionally as a model. In 1997, she appeared in the music video for George Michael's "Waltz Away Dreaming." She starred opposite Orlando Bloom in a 2002 Gap television advertisement directed by Cameron Crowe. She appeared in a Diet Coke television advertisement in 2004, directed by Michel Gondry. She advertised Absolut Vodka in a 2009 print campaign photographed by Ellen von Unwerth.

== Personal life ==
In 2023, Beckinsale announced that she had an immune disorder called Mast Cell Activation Syndrome. In 2024, she lost a significant amount of weight due to "stress and grief" after her stepfather died while her mother had Stage 4 cancer. At this time, she was hospitalized due to an esophageal rupture.

=== Relationships ===
Beckinsale was in a relationship with Welsh actor Michael Sheen from 1995 to 2003. They met when cast in a touring production of The Seagull in early 1995 and moved in together shortly afterwards. In 1997, they voiced an audiobook production of Romeo and Juliet. Their daughter was born in 1999. In 2001, Beckinsale said she was "embarrassed" that Sheen never proposed, but felt as though she was married. They broke up in early 2003, after the filming of Underworld. Beckinsale and Sheen remain close friends. She remarked in 2016, "He's really dear, close family. He's somebody I've known since I was 21 years old. I really love him a lot."

Beckinsale met American director Len Wiseman while working together on 2003's Underworld. She persuaded Wiseman to cast Sheen in the film, but while on set, Beckinsale and Wiseman fell in love. Wiseman's then-wife Dana, a kindergarten teacher, accused her husband of infidelity with Beckinsale. Beckinsale and Wiseman married on 9 May 2004 in Bel-Air, California. They separated in November 2015. Wiseman filed for divorce in 2016, citing "irreconcilable differences." Their divorce was finalised in November 2019. Beckinsale briefly dated American comedian Matt Rife in 2017 and 2018.

From January 2019 until April 2019, Beckinsale was in a relationship with American comedian Pete Davidson.

=== Personal and political beliefs ===
Beckinsale is a smoker. When she was nine, her mother moved in with Roy Battersby, and his sons introduced her to cigarettes.

She is a teetotaller, stating in 2003, "I've never been drunk even. I've never taken drugs. I've never had a one-night-stand."

In 2007, she appeared alongside David Schwimmer in the sixth of the Writers Guild of America member-conceived Internet videos for Project "Speechless," in support of the WGA labour strike against the Alliance of Motion Picture & Television Producers.

In 2012, she appeared alongside Judy Greer and Andrea Savage in the Funny or Die video "Republicans, Get in My Vagina," a satire of the Republican Party's policies concerning abortion and prenatal care.

=== Legal issues ===
In July 2003, the Press Complaints Commission dismissed a complaint filed by Beckinsale. She alleged that the tabloid Daily Mail had invaded her and her daughter's privacy by publishing photographs of the actress embracing and kissing her then-boyfriend Len Wiseman. The article in question was headlined, "Mummy's latest love scene leaves Lily unimpressed" and included a picture in which her then-four-year-old daughter appeared to be ignoring her mother's romantic actions. The Commission found that "the photographs had been taken in a public place and did not reveal any private details about Lily—such as her health or schooling—but were restricted to general observations about her apparent reaction to her surroundings."

In August 2003, Beckinsale received a published apology from the Daily Mail after it claimed that she had "spent time in a clinic" following her break-up with Michael Sheen. The apology was issued after she filed a complaint with the Press Complaints Commission. In 2009, Beckinsale was awarded £20,000 (equivalent to £31,900 in 2025) in damages by the British High Court after taking legal action against Express Newspapers. The Daily Express had falsely reported that she was "facing heartbreak" after losing out on a role in a remake of Barbarella.

=== Philanthropy ===
The British Heart Foundation has been Beckinsale's charity of choice "ever since [she] was six years old" when her father, who had coronary artery disease, died of a massive heart attack. She has also donated film memorabilia to the Epidermolysis Bullosa Medical Research Foundation, MediCinema, Habitat For Humanity and the Entertainment Industry Foundation. In 2008, she hosted the 4th Annual Pink Party to raise funds for the Women's Cancer Research Institute at Cedars-Sinai Medical Center and organised a screening of All About Eve for FilmAid International. In 2012, Beckinsale joined Nestlé's Share the Joy of Reading Program to raise awareness about the importance of literacy.

== Filmography ==
Key
†	Denotes works that have not yet been released

=== Film ===
Year	Title	Role	Notes
1993	Much Ado About Nothing	Hero	
1994	Prince of Jutland	Ethel	
1994	Uncovered	Julia	
1995	Marie-Louise ou la permission	Marie-Louise	
1995	Haunted	Christina Mariell	
1997	Shooting Fish	Georgie	
1998	The Last Days of Disco	Charlotte Pingress	
1999	Brokedown Palace	Darlene Davis	
2000	The Golden Bowl	Maggie Verver	
2001	Pearl Harbor	Lt. Evelyn Johnson	
2001	Serendipity	Sara Thomas	
2002	Laurel Canyon	Alex Elliot	
2002	Tiptoes	Carol	
2003	Underworld	Selene	
2004	Van Helsing	Anna Valerious	
2004	The Aviator	Ava Gardner	
2006	Underworld: Evolution	Selene	
2006	Click	Donna Newman	
2007	Snow Angels	Annie Marchand	
2007	Vacancy	Amy Fox	
2008	Winged Creatures	Carla Davenport	
2008	Nothing but the Truth	Rachel Armstrong	
2009	Underworld: Rise of the Lycans	Selene	Cameo (archival footage); voiceover
2009	Whiteout	Carrie Stetko	
2009	Everybody's Fine	Amy Goode	
2012	Contraband	Kate Farraday	
2012	Underworld: Awakening	Selene	
2012	Total Recall	Lori Quaid	
2013	The Trials of Cate McCall	Cate McCall	
2014	Stonehearst Asylum	Eliza Graves	
2014	The Face of an Angel	Simone Ford	
2015	Absolutely Anything	Catherine West	
2016	Love & Friendship	Lady Susan Vernon	
2016	The Disappointments Room	Dana	
2016	Underworld: Blood Wars	Selene	
2017	The Only Living Boy in New York	Johanna	
2018	Farming	Ingrid Carpenter	
2021	Jolt	Lindy Lewis	
2022	Prisoner's Daughter	Maxine MacLeary	
2023	Fool’s Paradise	Christiana Dior	
2024	Canary Black	Avery Graves	Also executive producer
2025	Stolen Girl	Maureen Dabbagh	
2025	Wildcat	Ada	
2026	The Patient	Dr. Rose	
2027	Twilight of the Dead †		Post-production
TBA	Drifter †	Wendy Ford	Filming
TBA	White †	Barbara	Post-production

=== Television ===
Year	Title	Role	Notes
1975	Couples	Child	2 episodes; credited as Kathrin Beckinsale
1991	Devices and Desires	Young Alice Mair	Miniseries; Voice; 1 episode
1991	One Against the Wind	Barbe Lindell	Television film
1992	Video Fantasies	Rachel	Segment: "Rachel's Dream"
1993	Anna Lee: Headcase	Thea Hahn	Television film
1995	Cold Comfort Farm	Flora Poste	Television film
1996	Emma	Emma Woodhouse	Television film
1998	Alice Through the Looking Glass	Alice	Television film
2006	Punk'd	Herself	Episode 7x01 - April 3, 2006 (set up by Michael Sheen)
2019	The Widow	Georgia Wells	Lead role; also co-executive producer
2019	The Late Late Show with James Corden	Herself	The Bold and the Lyrical - "Bruno Mars Soap Opera" skit on episode 5x90
2021	Guilty Party	Beth Burgess	Main cast; also executive producer

=== Web ===
Year	Title	Role	Notes
2007	"Speechless" (Episode 6 : 11/23 )		With David Schwimmer for the 2007–08 Writers Guild of America strike
2009	"ABSOLUT Drinks"		Directed by Ellen von Unwerth for Absolut Vodka
2012	"Republicans, Get in My Vagina"	Woman #3	Funny or Die microshort with Judy Greer and Andrea Savage
2013	"A Love Story"	Herself	For C Magazine: California Style & Culture
2016	"How to Get a Guy in the 1800s"	Herself	For Vanity Fair

=== Music videos ===
Year	Artist	Song	Notes
1998	George Michael	"Waltz Away Dreaming"	Silent performance
2008	Serge Gainsbourg	"Rollergirl"	Silent performance for Mean
2009	Jet	"Goodbye Hollywood"	Silent performance for Esquire

=== Video games ===
Year	Title	Role
2004	Underworld: The Eternal War	Selene
2014	The Elder Scrolls Online	Queen Ayrenn
2017	The Elder Scrolls Online: Morrowind	Queen Ayrenn
2018	The Elder Scrolls Online: Summerset	Queen Ayrenn
2022	The Elder Scrolls Online: High Isle	Queen Ayrenn

=== Stage ===
Year	Title	Author	Role	Venue
1992	Hay Fever	Noël Coward	Sorel Bliss	
1995	The Seagull	Anton Chekhov	Nina Zarechnaya	Theatre Royal, Bath and Tour
1996	Sweetheart	Nick Grosso	Toni	Royal Court Theatre
1996	Clocks and Whistles	Samuel Adamson	Anne	Bush Theatre
1996	Faithless			

=== Spoken word ===
Year	Title	Author	Role	Publisher	Notes
1996	Emma	Jane Austen	Narrator	Hodder & Stoughton	Abridged
1996	Emma & Knightley: Perfect Happiness in Highbury	Rachel Billington	Narrator	Hodder & Stoughton	Abridged
1997	Bold Little Tiger	Joan Stimson	Narrator	Ladybird Books	Unabridged
1997	The Proposal	Diana Hendry	Narrator	BBC Radio 4	Unabridged
1997	Romeo and Juliet	William Shakespeare	Juliet	Naxos Audiobooks	Unabridged full-cast dramatization
2018	Pride and Prejudice	Jane Austen	Narrator	Apple Books	Unabridged

=== Singing ===
Year	Title	Writer	Soundtrack	Notes
1995	"The Little American (Marie-Louise)"	Alexandre Desplat	Marie-Louise ou la permission	
1995	"La Petite Américaine"	Alexandre Desplat	Marie-Louise ou la permission	Duet with Yann Collette
1996	"Father, Father, Build Me a Boat"	(Traditional)	Emma	Duet with Ray Coulthard
1998	"Amazing Grace"	John Newton	The Last Days of Disco	

=== Documentaries ===
Year	Title	Notes
1977	This Is Your Life	Episode 18x02 - "Richard Beckinsale"
2000	The Unforgettable Richard Beckinsale	
2016	Rising Damp Forever	
2019	Untouchable	Archival footage; uncredited
2023	Dynamo Is Dead	Also in Dynamo Is Dead: Extras; Episode 1x06 - "Kate Beckinsale Extended Cut"

== Awards and nominations ==
Year	Association	Category	Film	Result	Ref.
1997	Sitges – Catalan International Film Festival	Best Actress	Shooting Fish	Won	
1999	London Film Critics' Circle Awards	British Supporting Actress of the Year (tied with Minnie Driver)	The Last Days of Disco	Won	
2002	MTV Movie Awards	Best Female Performance	Pearl Harbor	Nominated	
2002	Saturn Awards	Best Actress	Serendipity	Nominated	
2004	Saturn Awards	Best Actress	Underworld	Nominated	
2005	Screen Actors Guild Awards	Outstanding Performance by a Cast in a Motion Picture (shared with rest of cast)	The Aviator	Nominated	
2006	MTV Movie Awards	Best Hero	Underworld: Evolution	Nominated	
2006	People's Choice Awards	Favorite Female Action Star		Nominated	
2008	Critics' Choice Awards	Best Actress	Nothing But the Truth	Nominated	
2012	Spike Guys' Choice Awards	Jean-Claude Gahd Dam	Underworld: Awakening	Won	
2016	Gotham Awards	Best Actress	Love & Friendship	Nominated	
2016	Critics' Choice Awards	Best Actress in a Comedy	Love & Friendship	Nominated	
2017	London Film Critics' Circle Awards	Actress of the Year	Love & Friendship	Nominated	
2017	London Film Critics' Circle Awards	British/Irish Actress of the Year	Love & Friendship	Won	
2017	Evening Standard British Film Awards	Best Actress	Love & Friendship	Won	
2021	National Film Awards UK	Best Actress	Farming	Won	
2022	National Film Awards UK	Best Actress	Jolt	Won	
