= KHBX =

KHBX may refer to:

- KHBX-LP, a low-power radio station (99.3 FM) licensed to serve Hobbs, New Mexico, United States
- Dog Bites Man, which featured a fake TV station named KHBX
