= Hiatus (television) =

Break in a TV program's schedule

In United States network television programming, a hiatus is a break of several weeks, months or years in the normal broadcast programming of a television series. Such a break can occur part-way through the season of a series, in which case it is also called a mid-season break, or between distinct television seasons (usually starting in June and ending in September, when shooting starts for the next season). In the Northern Hemisphere, the breaks between late November and early February are also referred to as winter breaks or, in the Christian cultural sphere, Christmas breaks.

Until the late 1990s, summer breaks were sometimes replaced by summer replacement series.

== Planned hiatus ==
Most scripted television series on the major U.S. television networks are scheduled for a season of 22 episodes, airing in a time span running 36 weeks from September to May; planned hiatuses are incorporated into a network's schedule in order to allow time for production to catch up with broadcasting, prevent episodes from airing during time periods where lower ratings are anticipated, and to allow networks to reserve major episodes (often including special guest stars, major storylines, or other similar "stunts") to air during the traditional "sweeps" months in November, February, and May—whose ratings are traditionally used as a benchmark for determining the cost of advertising.

The Christmas and holiday season between late-November and January is generally observed as a hiatus by broadcasters; this hiatus—often known as the "winter break" or "Christmas break"—typically concludes with the start of the "mid-season" in the new year. The final episode of the year may be promoted as a "fall finale" or "winter finale", and include a major plot development or cliffhanger that will be resolved when the season resumes. It is not uncommon for a fall finale to be a holiday-themed episode. Production of television programs is similarly paused during the peak of the holiday season in order to provide a break for their cast and crew.

Some broadcasters—particularly cable television channels and streaming services—have intentionally scheduled premieres of new series during the winter break in order to take advantage of reduced competition from first-run programming, including TNT and USA Network's December premieres of The Librarians and Ascension respectively, and Hallmark Channel's focus on Christmas-themed movies throughout the holiday season.

Hiatuses may also be scheduled around major events that are anticipated to attract a large amount of viewers, such as the Winter Olympics. In February 2018, ABC and CBS placed their scripted programs on hiatus to avoid competing with the 2018 Winter Olympics on NBC, but intentionally scheduled spinoffs of their flagship reality shows The Bachelor (The Bachelor Winter Games) and Big Brother (Celebrity Big Brother) in a counterprogramming effort. In 2026, CBS delayed most of its midseason premieres until March 2026, ABC continued to air select series such as American Idol, The Rookie, and Will Trent, while Fox did not observe an additional hiatus.

== Cancellation ==
A network may put a show on hiatus before canceling it. This may be to evaluate the series' quality, warn the television producers in an effort to push them to produce a more profitable product, fill its timeslot with another program to compare ratings, or warn viewers that the show is not pulling its weight in ratings to see how the show performs in reruns before deciding whether or not it deserves another season.

In some cases, this is due to creative differences. ABC dealt with such a situation in the mid-1980s with their Tuesday night dramedy Moonlighting on three fronts, including actor Bruce Willis's growing disinterest in the series due to his budding film career, Cybill Shepherd unable to handle the overwhelming workload of the series, and overlong scripts and overbearing production demands from series creator/writer/showrunner Glenn Gordon Caron. The series was never able to fulfill a full series run in its five seasons and had multiple production hiatuses, to the network's constant consternation.

== Other reasons ==
A series may be put on hiatus for other reasons. The 2007–08 Writers Guild of America strike forced several television series (including Pushing Daisies, Eli Stone, Chuck, The Big Bang Theory, and Heroes) to go into un-planned hiatus and deferred the scheduled returns of other series such as 24 for an extended period. A show may go on hiatus in reaction to its content: The Pokémon anime was put on hiatus in Japan from December 17, 1997 until April 16, 1998 after the airing of an episode which caused 685 viewers to have seizures. A show may also be put on hiatus due to personal issues with a cast member, or an illness or death: examples are the death of 8 Simple Rules actor John Ritter; The Royal Family being retooled after the death of Redd Foxx; and Sonny with a Chance actress Demi Lovato departing Disney Channel to deal with personal issues, leading to that show's retooling around the show within a show So Random!.

In 2020, that year's coronavirus pandemic had an inordinate and worldwide impact on the entirety of the television industry, effectively forcing a number of programs across all genres to go on hiatus or end their seasons early due to public health concerns and public gathering prohibitions.

== See also ==
- Hiatus (production): the annual halt-of-production of most television series and films.
