= I'm Sorry (TV series) =

American sitcom television series (2017-2019)

- Genre: Sitcom
- Created by: Andrea Savage
- Starring: Andrea Savage; Tom Everett Scott; Olive Petrucci
- Composers: Andrew Feltenstein; John Nau; Danny Dunlap
- Country of origin: United States
- Original language: English
- No. of seasons: 2
- No. of episodes: 20

Production
- Executive producers: Andrea Savage; Joey Slamon; Jessica Elbaum; Jason Zaro; Billy Rosenberg; Will Ferrell; Adam McKay; Andy Samberg; Jorma Taccone; Akiva Schaffer
- Camera setup: Single-camera
- Running time: 24 min.
- Production companies: Pamplemousse Productions; Kablamo! (season 1); A24 (season 2); Lonely Island Classics; Gloria Sanchez Productions

Original release
- Network: TruTV
- Release: July 12, 2017 – March 13, 2019

I'm Sorry (stylized as i'm sorry.) is an American sitcom television series written by and starring Andrea Savage; it premiered July 12, 2017, on TruTV. On August 17, 2017, truTV renewed the series for a second season. On June 18, 2019, the series was renewed for a third season that was scheduled to return in 2020. However, on August 25, 2020, that decision was reversed when TruTV cancelled the series after two seasons due to the COVID-19 pandemic.

== Synopsis ==
The show is a situation comedy centering on writer Andrea Warren as she navigates motherhood, marriage, her career, and her social life in suburban L.A.

== Cast ==
=== Main ===
- Andrea Savage as Andrea Warren
- Tom Everett Scott as Mike Harris
- Olive Petrucci as Amelia Harris-Warren

=== Recurring ===
- Kathy Baker as Sharon
- Nelson Franklin as David
- Judy Greer as Maureen
- Jason Mantzoukas as Kyle
- Martin Mull as Martin
- Lyndon Smith as Miss Shelly
- Gary Anthony Williams as Brian
- Steve Zissis as Sandy
- Scott Aukerman as Rob

== Episodes ==
Seasons of I'm Sorry
Season	Episodes	Originally released	
Season	Episodes	First released	Last released
1	10	July 12, 2017	September 6, 2017
2	10	January 9, 2019	March 13, 2019

=== Season 1 (2017) ===
I'm Sorry, season 1 episodes
No. overall	No. in season	Title	Directed by	Written by	Original release date	U.S. viewers (millions)
1	1	"Pilot"	Rachel Lee Goldenberg	Andrea Savage	July 12, 2017	0.31
Andrea gets into a confrontation at her dance class and is accused of using foul language. Later she finds out a fellow mom at Amelia's school is a former porn star. Both issues come to ahead at a children's birthday party where the rest of the parents of Amelia's classmates find out about the former porn star and Andrea runs into someone from her dance class.
2	2	"Racist Daughter"	Dale Stern	Andrea Savage	July 12, 2017	0.19
Andrea befriends a mom in Amelia's class but Amelia has no interest in befriending the child because she looks different from her. Andrea and her husband work to teach her tolerance.
3	3	"Ass Cubes"	Dale Stern	Joey Slamon	July 19, 2017	0.29
Andrea's writing partner and Amelia's teacher go out on a date and Andrea learns more about Amelia's teacher than she cared to.
4	4	"Goddess Party"	Dale Stern	Dannah Phirman & Danielle Schneider	July 26, 2017	0.25
Andrea's friend is going through a divorce and asks Andrea to throw her a divorce party which involves crystals.
5	5	"Acts of Service"	Amy York Rubin	Lon Zimmet	August 2, 2017	0.28
Andrea and Mike run into their dentist while out to dinner and see him passionately make out with his wife. This causes Andrea to question if she and Mike are passionate enough. She reads about the five love languages and schedules a couples counseling session.
6	6	"Too Slow"	Dale Stern	Tony Gama-Lobo	August 9, 2017	0.34
Andrea tries to expose Amelia to other types of families by scheduling a play date with a boy in her class who has two moms. This is short lived as the child and the couple are tough to be around. Meanwhile, Andrea gets into a car accident while trying to take a picture of something she finds funny. Andrea is also convinced that her brother is gay and has been living with his partner, going so far as to tell her mom this is fact. Andrea later finds out how wrong she is.
7	7	"Divorce Fantasy"	Amy York Rubin	Andrea Savage	August 16, 2017	0.28
While helping her friend navigate the divorce dating scene, Andrea discloses her fantasy of being a divorcee. While out being a wing woman for her divorced friend, her friend gets roofied.
8	8	"Butt Bumpers"	Andrea Savage	Dannah Phirman & Danielle Schneider	August 23, 2017	0.27
Andrea and Mike make couple friends with the parents of one of Amelia's friends. It gets awkward when Andrea takes Amelia over to the new friends house and only the friend and the friend's dad are home. They go swimming as planned, but Andrea is wearing a bikini and feels self conscious. The kids then ask the adults to demonstrate the pool game "butt bumpers".
9	9	"Weekend Alone"	Dale Stern	Lon Zimmet	August 30, 2017	0.28
Mike is out of town and Amelia is spending the weekend at her Grandma's so Andrea decides to make the most of her weekend by hanging out with her single comedy writer friends. She realizes the single life is not for her.
10	10	"Off the Charts"	Amy York Rubin	Joey Slamon	September 6, 2017	0.35
Andrea and Mike get their fertility checked after Andrea's eye doctor tells her if she wants another child she should consider the fact that she's not getting any younger.

=== Season 2 (2019) ===
I'm Sorry, season 2 episodes
No. overall	No. in season	Title	Directed by	Written by	Original release date	U.S. viewers (millions)
11	1	"Quietly Bleeding"	Alex Reid	Andrea Savage	January 9, 2019	0.25
12	2	"These Are My Fingers"	Stephanie Laing	Elizabeth Laime	January 16, 2019	0.20
13	3	"Barbara T. Warren"	Andrea Savage	Krister Johnson	January 23, 2019	0.15
14	4	"Couple's Massage"	Stephanie Laing	Andrea Savage	January 30, 2019	0.23
15	5	"Extra Boobs"	Alex Reid	Jeff Drake	February 6, 2019	0.23
16	6	"The Small of My Back"	Alex Reid	Joey Slamon	February 13, 2019	0.19
17	7	"Little Louse on the Prairie"	Andrea Savage	Joey Slamon	February 20, 2019	0.21
18	8	"Sophie's Choice"	Stephanie Laing	Andrea Savage	February 27, 2019	0.19
19	9	"Miss Diana Ross"	Alex Reid	Krister Johnson	March 6, 2019	0.24
20	10	"New York vs. LA"	Stephanie Laing	Joey Slamon	March 13, 2019	0.20

== Critical reception ==
The first season of I'm Sorry received mainly positive reviews. The review aggregation website Rotten Tomatoes reported a 75% approval rating, with an average rating based on 12 reviews. Metacritic, which uses a weighted average, assigned a score of 64 out of 100 based on 8 reviews, indicating "generally favorable reviews". The series has been often compared to that of Larry David's HBO series Curb Your Enthusiasm.

In a negative-then-somewhat-positive review, Sonia Saraiya from variety.com stated:

do we really need another sitcom about the private life of an indie comedian in Los Angeles?

In a negative-then-somewhat-positive review, Tim Goodman from The Hollywood Reporter stated:

There are a lot of series mining this style so it's not like Savage has done anything wrong by jumping into the fray, but I'm Sorry will need to find its own unique variation soon enough. But early on the show feels like it's already in rhythm, which is a nice surprise.

== Production halt ==
On 25 August 2020, Deadline Hollywood reported:

"I’m Sorry was two weeks into filming Season 3 when all Hollywood production was shut down in mid-March. All 10 scripts for the new season have been written... ...likely a combination of the impact from COVID-19 and the major changes and belt-tightening at TruTV parent WarnerMedia..."
