= Republicans, Get in My Vagina =

- Directed by: Andrea Savage
- Story by: Andrea Savage
- Starring: Andrea Savage; Judy Greer; Kate Beckinsale
- Production company: Funny or Die
- Release date: 2012
- Country: United States
- Language: English

Republicans, Get in My Vagina is a 2012 American short film starring Andrea Savage, Judy Greer and Kate Beckinsale. It was written and directed by Andrea Savage.

== Cast ==
- Andrea Savage as Woman # 1
- Judy Greer as Woman # 2
- Kate Beckinsale as Woman # 3
