= Hiatus (production) =

The holiday production hiatus, or "hiatus", is a common practice in Los Angeles, California, British Columbia, and other places that regularly produce television and film content. This is concurrent with the hiatus in programming between halves of a regular television season, winter break for schools, and the peak of the Christmas and holiday season. During the initial phases of the COVID-19 pandemic, the hiatus was extended, at least in Los Angeles, to accommodate a surge in infections. Hiatus may also start earlier, to accommodate writing and casting issues and needs.
