= Dog Bites Man =

- Created by: Dan Mazer
- Directed by: Dan Mazer
- Starring: Zach Galifianakis; A.D. Miles; Andrea Savage; Matt Walsh
- Country of origin: United States
- Original language: English
- No. of seasons: 1
- No. of episodes: 10 (1 unaired)

Production
- Running time: 30 minutes
- Production company: DreamWorks Television

Original release
- Network: Comedy Central
- Release: July 7 – August 9, 2006

Dog Bites Man is an American sitcom that aired on Comedy Central from July 7 to August 9, 2006. It began airing on The Comedy Channel in Australia in June 2007. The series was produced by DreamWorks Television.

== Premise ==
Dog Bites Man is a parody of local news coverage, and follows the misadventures of a struggling news team from Spokane, Washington as they travel around the country producing news segments. A mockumentary, the show incorporates scenes with the cast in traditional skits as well as them improvising with non-actors, who believe that they are an actual (albeit unusual) news crew.

== Disclaimer ==
Perhaps to lessen confusion pertaining to the true reality of the show, starting with episode five each episode began with the following message: "With the exception of the news team, the following episode contains real people who were not made aware they were being filmed as part of a comedy show."

== Cast ==
- Zach Galifianakis as Alan Finger, the show's incompetent director. Also a musician, in episode three he scores a hit song in Panama City, titled “Come on and Get It (Up in Dem Guts),” under the name “The Finger.”
- A.D. Miles as Marty Shonson, an intern who serves as a production assistant.
- Andrea Savage as Tillie Sullivan, the team's producer.
- Matt Walsh as Kevin Beekin, the star reporter for the news show, who used to date Tillie the producer and still has feelings for her.

== Cancellation ==
When asked on Michael Showalter's webisode series The Michael Showalter Showalter if Comedy Central had cancelled the show, Zach Galifianakis replied "Yes, thank God." He went on to explain that "messing with people" made him uncomfortable.

== Episodes ==
All titles were prefaced with "Assignment:"

No.	Title	Original release date
1	"Body Builders"	June 7, 2006
The team reports on a bodybuilding contest and attempts to spice up the story. Also, the recently reunited Kevin Beekin and Tillie Sullivan attempt to get along.
2	"Undercover Homosexual"	June 14, 2006
The team tries to uncover discrimination against homosexuals in the city by sending Kevin in as an undercover homosexual. At the end of the episode, the team concludes that "homophobia is gone forever".
3	"Spring Break"	June 21, 2006
The team does a report on spring break. Tillie, who ostensibly despises spring break, gets caught up in the partying and Kevin attempts to "be cool" and talk to kids about the dangers of spring break. Also, Alan Finger records and releases a song, "Up In 'Dem Guts".
4	"Republican Leadership Conference"	June 28, 2006
The team go to report on the Republican Leadership Conference. Whilst there, Tillie and Marty share a hotel room and Marty grows attracted to Tillie. Kevin talks a lot about meeting up with Chris Matthews and Alan gets people to sign a petition for the release his mother from prison for tasering up to 22 dogs.
5	"Team Building"	July 12, 2006
The station is thinking about doing advertising for the show so a test audience is used to figure out the show's audience demographics. The show is criticized, causing the crew to be forced to go to a team building camp. Beekin is especially cynical about the process and is very rude to the leader whom he calls "Hippie Rambo". Beekin and Tillie hook up after Beekin shares his emotions around a campfire. By the end of the camp, they are all working well together, but that ends soon after they go back to work.
6	"Brighton, Florida"	July 19, 2006
The network sends the team to Brighton, Florida to cover a missing girl story. Marty messes up the tickets and the team ends up in Brighton, Colorado, so the team decides to fake the missing girl story at that location. Marty is fixated on setting the zoo on fire but doesn't. The girl is found at the end while the team is creating a vigil.
7	"Christian Convention"	July 26, 2006
In an effort to boost their ratings among the God-fearing demographic, the KHBX News team infuses its reports with religion by covering a Christian rock concert and a Christian gaming convention. In the process of filing their report, they learn new things about their own faith.
8	"Gas Prices"	August 2, 2006
Due to budget cuts, the members of the KHBX news team are in danger of losing their jobs; it's either them or the Doppler, and it seems the Doppler has the edge. At the same time, they prepare themselves for alternative careers. Marty tries his hand at stand-up comedy while Alan returns to the seedy world of Korean Karaoke.
9	"Daytime Talk Pilot"	August 9, 2006
Kevin is sick of doing menial garbage pickup reporting. He creates a pilot for a talk show titled Beekin and Eggs. He wants it to have A-list guests but fails in that regard. He interviews a guy from a gas station who charges by the half gallon since his pumps only display up to $3 a gallon. The team members think they do a good job yet the network fails to pick it up.
10	Klan	Unaired
This episode never aired. Though details are scarce outside of cast publicity interviews leading up to the show's initial debut, episode 10 features a remote from a Ku Klux Klan picnic in Pulaski, Tennessee. In an interview with the Knoxville News Sentinel on June 27, 2006, castmember Matt Walsh said, "The premise for the Klan episode is that we thought we were going to a typical American picnic, but we see the robes and the hoods and we realize where we are, [...] But, then, we decide to stay because the hot dogs are so good." In an interview on The Michael Showalter Showalter, Zach Galifianakis stated that Dan Mazer told the actors that there would be no guns, but that "he was wrong--there were a lot of guns".

== Home media ==
The series was released on DVD by DreamWorks Home Entertainment.

DVD name	Release date	Ep #
The Complete Series	May 15, 2012	9

== Producers and creators ==
- Jonathan Barry - Executive Producer
- Justin Falvey - Executive Producer
- Darryl Frank - Executive Producer
- Dan Mazer - Executive Producer
- Keith Raskin - Producer
- Dan Mazer - Creator
