= Judy Greer =

American actress (born 1975)

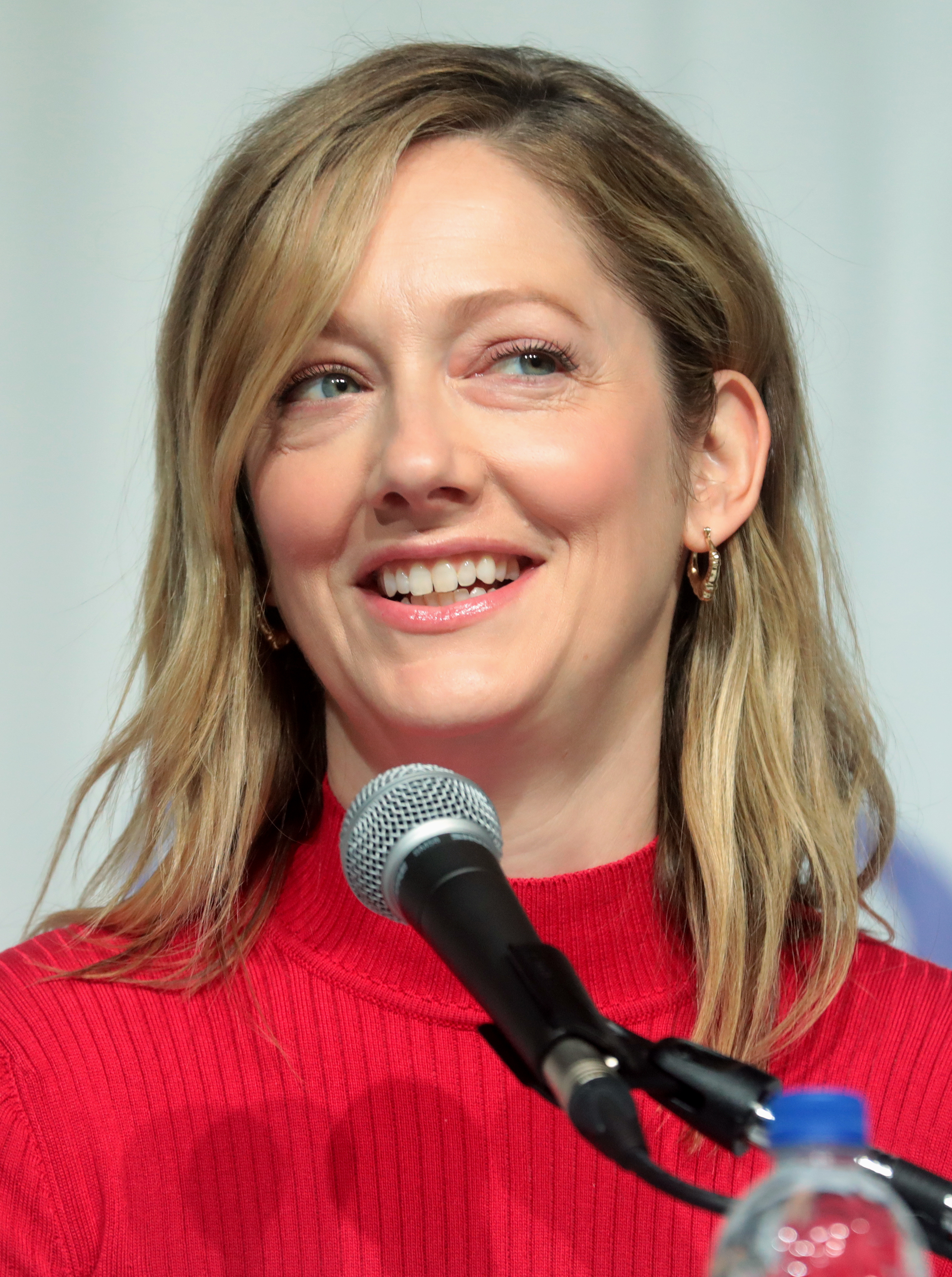
- Greer in 2019
- Born: Judith Therese Evans; July 20, 1975 (age 51); Detroit, Michigan, U.S.
- Education: DePaul University (BFA)
- Occupation: Actress
- Years active: 1997–present
- Works: Full list
- Spouse: Dean E. Johnsen (m. 2011)

Judith Therese Evans (born July 20, 1975), known professionally as Judy Greer, is an American actress. She is primarily known as a character actress who has appeared in a wide variety of films. She rose to prominence for her supporting roles in the films Jawbreaker (1999), What Women Want (2000), 13 Going on 30 (2004), Elizabethtown (2005), 27 Dresses (2008), and Love & Other Drugs (2010).

Greer expanded into multiple genres with roles in films such as The Wedding Planner (2001), Adaptation (2002), The Village (2004), The Descendants (2011), Jeff, Who Lives at Home (2011), Carrie (2013), Men, Women & Children (2014), Grandma (2015), Lemon (2017), Where'd You Go, Bernadette (2019), Uncle Frank (2020), and Hollywood Stargirl (2022). She appeared in numerous blockbusters, such as Dawn of the Planet of the Apes (2014) its sequel War for the Planet of the Apes (2017), Jurassic World (2015), Halloween (2018) its sequel Halloween Kills (2021), and the Marvel Cinematic Universe films Ant-Man (2015), Ant-Man and the Wasp (2018), and Guardians of the Galaxy Vol. 3 (2023). She made her directorial debut with the comedy-drama film A Happening of Monumental Proportions (2017).

On television, Greer is best known for her starring voice role as Cheryl Tunt in the FXX animated comedy series Archer (2009–2023) and as Lina Bowman in the FX sitcom Married (2014–2015). She also appeared in the comedy series The Big Bang Theory (2010), Arrested Development (2003–2006, 2013–2019), Two and a Half Men (2003–2015), It's Always Sunny in Philadelphia (2007–2011), Kidding (2018–2020), Let's Go Luna! (2018–2022), and Reboot (2022).

== Early life ==
Greer was born in Detroit, Michigan, on July 20, 1975. Her mother, Mollie Ann (née Greer), is a hospital administrator, and her father, Rich Evans, is a mechanical engineer. Her mother was once a nun, who was "kicked out" of the convent after eight years for wild behavior, including owning a red bathing suit.

Greer was raised Roman Catholic and grew up in Redford Township and Livonia. She attended Churchill High School, where she was a part of the Creative and Performing Arts Program and graduated from The Theatre School at DePaul University in 1997 with a Bachelor of Fine Arts degree. She later adopted her mother's maiden name for her stage name, as several other actresses are named "Judy" or Judi" Evans.

== Career ==
=== 1997–2003 ===
Greer made her film debut in the horror film Stricken (1998), as a college student involved in a fatal prank. This was followed by a small role in the Chicago-filmed drama Kissing a Fool (1998). She was cast in her first major role as Fern Mayo, a nerdy teenager who uncovers her classmates' murder of their friend, in Darren Stein's black comedy Jawbreaker (1999). Greer followed this with small parts in the romantic comedy films, What Women Want (2000) and The Wedding Planner (2001). She was cast in a 2002 pilot for NBC alongside Stephen Colbert, Untitled Ken Finkleman Project (Imagine Entertainment), based on the Canadian show The Newsroom from Ken Finkleman. Colbert portrayed Finkleman and Greer played his sister.

Greer had a recurring role on the Fox comedy series Arrested Development (2003–2005, 2013, 2018), playing Kitty Sanchez in ten episodes total and appearing in each of the series' three original seasons. In a 2009 interview, she said that she is most recognized for this role. She also had a supporting role in Adaptation (2002).

=== 2004–2010 ===
In 2004, Greer co-starred in the romantic comedy 13 Going on 30, starring Jennifer Garner as a girl who wakes up one morning as a 30-year-old woman. Greer played Lucy, an untrustworthy fellow editor of Garner's at a fashion magazine where both work. The film was a commercial success, grossing $96.5 million worldwide, and received positive reviews from critics. Greer had a supporting role in M. Night Shyamalan's thriller film The Village, about a village whose population lives in fear of creatures inhabiting the woods beyond it. Despite mixed reviews, the film was a success at the box office, grossing $256.7 million worldwide. Greer then played another supporting role in Jenna Fischer's directorial debut, the comedy LolliLove, which premiered at the St. Louis International Film Festival to positive reviews from critics, though it was ultimately released straight-to-DVD.

In 2005, Greer first played a female werewolf in Wes Craven's horror film Cursed, starring Christina Ricci and Jesse Eisenberg. The film was a failure at the box office and was widely panned by critics, with Craven later expressing disappointment in the film. Greer then starred in the comedy-drama The Great New Wonderful, which depicts the lives of several New Yorkers one year after the September 11th attacks. In her character's vignette, Greer played a woman struggling to keep her marriage together. The film premiered at the Tribeca Film Festival to mostly positive reviews. Ty Burr of the Boston Globe called the film "an actor's playpen", and remarked that "Greer has been stuck so long in goofball supporting roles that she tears into this part – a smart, loving mother frightened of her own son – as if it were prime rib." Following an appearance in the drama In Memory of My Father, Greer featured in Cameron Crowe's tragic-romantic comedy Elizabethtown, starring Orlando Bloom, Kirsten Dunst, Alec Baldwin and Susan Sarandon. The film premiered at the Venice International Film Festival and garnered negative reviews from critics.

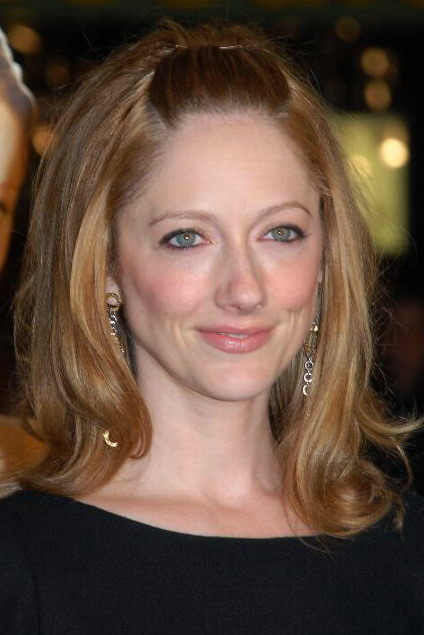
Greer at the premiere of 27 Dresses in 2008

Following an appearance in Paul Weitz's comedy American Dreamz, Greer starred in the comedy-drama The TV Set (both 2006), as a personal manager to the scriptwriter (David Duchovny) of a television series. The film premiered at the Tribeca Film Festival to generally positive reviews from critics. Dana Stevens of Slate noted that "[...] Judy Greer, an Anne Heche lookalike with Lisa Kudrow's comic timing, nearly steals the movie as Mike's desperately chirpy manager." Greer also starred in the short-lived CBS comedy-drama series Love Monkey (2006). The following year, Greer made brief appearances in the independent road film The Go-Getter and the comedy The Grand (both 2007). During this period, Greer became a frequent guest star for producer Chuck Lorre, having appeared in his sitcoms Two and a Half Men (2007–2015), The Big Bang Theory (2010), and Mom (2015).

In 2008, Greer starred opposite Zach Galifianakis in the independent satire Visioneers, and played the best friend of a bridesmaid in the romantic comedy 27 Dresses. The latter film received mostly negative reviews from critics, but was a commercial success, grossing $162.6 million worldwide. Greer played a similar role in the romantic drama Love Happens (2009), starring Jennifer Aniston. Greer also took on the leading role in the ABC sitcom Miss Guided (2008), in which she played a guidance counselor working at a high school. The series was canceled after one season. That same year, Greer appeared as a yoga instructor in the "Get a Mac" advertisements, which also featured John Hodgman and Justin Long. Beginning in 2009, Greer has provided the voice of Cheryl Tunt in the FX animated adult sitcom Archer, as well as Wendy Park in the Nick at Nite stop-motion animated sitcom Glenn Martin, DDS (2009–2011).

In 2010, Greer first starred in the comedy Barry Munday, in which she played a woman who becomes pregnant by a lonely womanizer (Patrick Wilson). The film premiered at the South by Southwest Film Festival to mixed reviews. Joe Leydon of Variety praised Greer's performance, commending the actress for bringing "some welcome emotional truth" to her "almost too convincing" role. Following roles in the family comedy Marmaduke and the romantic crime comedy Henry's Crime, Greer featured in the comedy-drama Peep World. She played Laura Meyerwitz, a pregnant wife whose husband (Michael C. Hall) is revealed to have an addiction to pornography from his brother's thinly veiled novel about their family. The film premiered at the Toronto International Film Festival, and in spite of largely negative reviews, critics singled out Greer's performance for praise. Both Manohla Dargis of The New York Times and Elizabeth Weitzman of the New York Daily News considered Greer's performance to be the most "genuine" of the cast. Greer also played a supporting role in the romantic comedy-drama Love & Other Drugs, which was a commercial success, grossing $102.8 million worldwide. Greer also appeared in "Truth Be Told", the 17th episode of season 1 of Modern Family, playing the role of Denise, Phil Dunphy’s ex-girlfriend who has spent a year exchanging messages with Phil on Facebook and then comes to his house in hopes of starting an affair with him.

=== 2011–2014 ===
In 2011, Greer first starred in the crime thriller The Key Man, as the wife of a salesman who becomes involved in an insurance scam. The film premiered at South by Southwest. Though Seth Freilich of Pajiba considered Greer to be "lovely as always", he felt that she was "underused", and called for the film industry to offer her better roles. Greer starred in Alexander Payne's film The Descendants, alongside George Clooney. Greer played a woman who discovers that her husband had an extramarital affair with the now-comatose wife of the attorney. The film premiered at the Telluride Film Festival to critical acclaim. Greer herself received particularly strong reviews for her performance; David Thomson of The New Republic found Greer to be "touching", while Philip Kemp of Sight & Sound praised Greer for turning "her few brief scenes [...] into a moving portrayal of undeservedly broken trust." For her performance in the film, Greer received nominations for the Screen Actors Guild Award for Outstanding Performance by a Cast in a Motion Picture and the Satellite Award for Best Supporting Actress – Motion Picture.

That same year, Greer also starred in the comedy-drama Jeff, Who Lives at Home, directed by brothers Jay and Mark Duplass, in which she and Ed Helms played a couple whose marriage is failing. The film premiered at the Toronto International Film Festival to positive reviews, with Roger Ebert of the Chicago Sun-Times calling it "a whimsical comedy [that depends] on [...] the discontent of Helms and Greer." For her work in both The Descendants and Jeff, Who Lives at Home, Greer received the John Cassavetes Award at the Denver Film Festival, becoming the first female actor to be the recipient of the award. Greer then starred in the short-lived CBS sitcom Mad Love, about a group of people in their 30s trying to find love. David Hinckley of New York Daily News felt that Greer played her role "perfectly" in the series, which was canceled after one season. Greer also hosted an online series of exercise videos titled Reluctantly Healthy, which was later adapted by Litton Entertainment as part of their Saturday-morning One Magnificent Morning block for The CW.

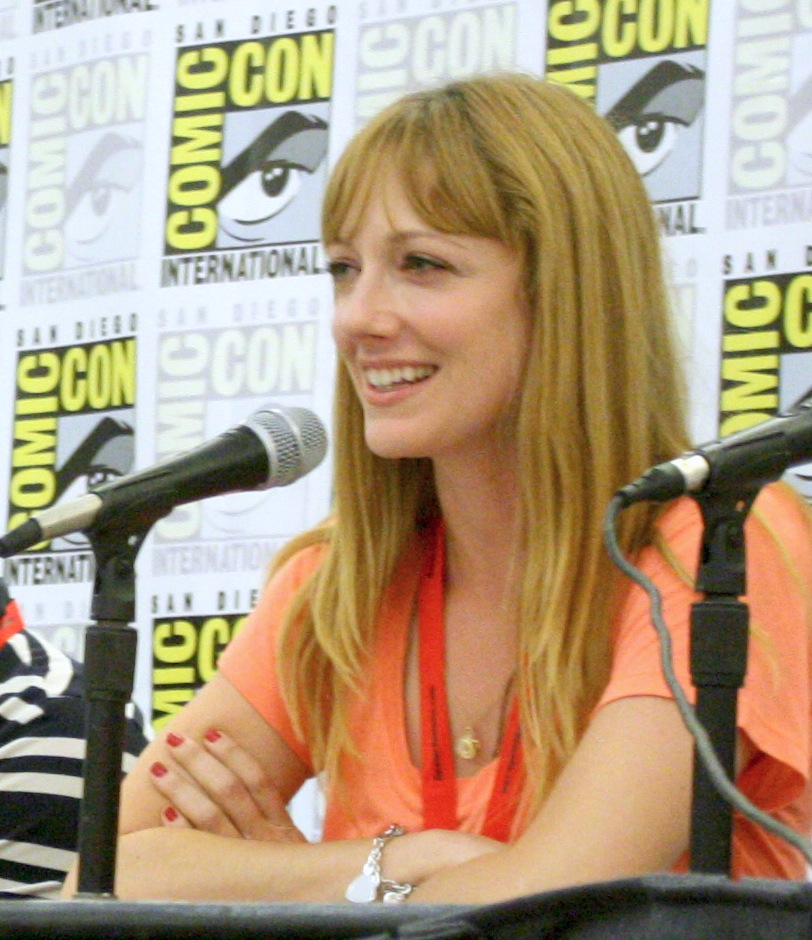
Greer at San Diego Comic-Con in July 2010

Following a role in the critically panned romantic comedy Playing for Keeps, starring Gerard Butler, Greer made her Broadway debut in Theresa Rebeck's comedy Dead Accounts, alongside Katie Holmes, Norbert Leo Butz, Jayne Houdyshell and Josh Hamilton (both 2012). The play received negative reviews, with Ben Brantley of The New York Times criticizing Greer for not "transcend[ing] her character's function as a visitor-from-another-planet plot device." In Carrie (2013), starring Chloë Grace Moretz and Julianne Moore, Greer played Miss Desjardin, a gym teacher who becomes involved with the titular character (Moretz), a shy high-school student and outcast, who secretly possesses telekinesis. The film, which serves as an adaptation of Stephen King's 1974 novel of the same name and a re-make of Brian de Palma's 1976 film, received mixed reviews from critics, who considered it to be an "unnecessary" adaptation. Nevertheless, Michael Phillips of the Chicago Tribune, who gave the film a positive review, remarked, "The acting's strong; in addition to Moretz and Moore, Judy Greer is a welcome presence in the [...] role of the sympathetic gym instructor."

In 2014, Greer first appeared in the supernatural drama film Jamie Marks Is Dead, about a deceased boy who returns to his friends as a ghost. The film premiered at the Sundance Film Festival to positive reviews. Greer next portrayed the motion-capture role of the female chimpanzee Cornelia in the science fiction action film Dawn of the Planet of the Apes (2014). The film received positive reviews and was a success at the box office, grossing $708.8 million worldwide. Greer then played a supporting role in Jason Reitman's drama Men, Women & Children, which premiered at the Toronto International Film Festival. The film was widely panned by critics, with Jason Bailey of FlavorWire criticizing the plot surrounding Greer's character, a single mother promoting her daughter on a modeling website: "I cannot begin to tell you how effectively this wholly unbelievable thread manages to single-handedly unravel the narrative, but I can assure you that when even Judy Greer can't sell a plot point, it should not be employed."

That same year, Greer made her directorial debut with the AOL short film Quiet Time, which focuses on how transcendental meditation can be used for stress relief. In an interview with Glamour, Greer revealed that she had wanted to venture into directing and contacted AOL herself, which was impressed by her passion for the meditation. Greer also released her first autobiographical collection of essays, titled I Don't Know What You Know Me From: Confessions of a Co-Star, which details her life experiences and career in the film industry. The book received positive reviews; Kirkus Reviews noted that "This is not a Hollywood roman à clef; Greer doesn't dish and is amazed by and grateful for her good fortune [...] Greer is an engaging and witty storyteller, at turns wistful (of her beloved hometown, she writes, "Detroit is America's sad family member who can't catch a break") and unsparingly honest ("I used to be more ugly")." Greer starred in the FX comedy series Married (2014–2015), in which she and Nat Faxon played a long-married couple. Willa Paskin of Slate praised Greer's chemistry with Faxon, referring to them both as "charismatic, jangly, scene-stealing performers."

=== 2015–2018 ===
In 2015, Greer appeared in two major film franchises—Jurassic World, and the Marvel Cinematic Universe entry, Ant-Man. In Jurassic World, Greer played the mother of two of the film's protagonists, Gray and Zach. The film was a major success at the box-office, grossing $1.670 billion worldwide, and received positive reviews from critics. In Ant-Man, Greer played the ex-wife of the film's titular hero (Paul Rudd). The film was also a critical and commercial success, grossing $519.3 million worldwide. Greer subsequently reprised her role in the sequel Ant-Man and the Wasp (2018). Following a supporting role as Lily Tomlin's love interest in Paul Weitz's critically acclaimed comedy-drama Grandma, Greer took on a leading role in Jamie Babbit's dark comedy Addicted to Fresno, in which she and Natasha Lyonne played sisters who work as housekeepers in a hotel who find themselves in trouble when one of them accidentally kills a guest. While the film itself received largely negative reviews, Greer's performance drew praise from critics. Jason Bailey of FlavorWire asserted that Greer and Lyonne "anchor [the film] with a priceless good sister/bad sister dynamic [...] Greer, as a bitter burnout, puts a sharp little spin on every line, turning each into a little dagger [...]"

Greer also made appearances in the Walt Disney Studios science-fiction film Tomorrowland and the comedy Entourage (both 2015), based on the HBO television series of the same name. Greer's only releases of 2016 were the little-seen dramas All We Had and Ordinary World, neither of which left an impression on critics. That same year, she also provided the voice of Beep in the Netflix children's animated programs Ask the StoryBots and StoryBots Super Songs. Greer's first two films of 2017—the comedy-dramas Lemon and Wilson—held their world premieres at the Sundance Film Festival. Greer then reprised her motion-capture role as Cornelia in the sequel War for the Planet of the Apes. Like its predecessor, the film was a critical and commercial success, grossing $490.7 million worldwide. After playing the daughter of a widow (Robert Redford) in the Netflix drama film Our Souls at Night, Greer starred in the comedy film Adventures in Public School, in which she played a mother whose son enters public after years of her homeschooling. The film premiered at the Toronto International Film Festival, and Greer received praise for her performance. Sherri Linden of The Hollywood Reporter highlighted Greer's "long-proven down-to-earth magic," while Dennis Harvey of Variety remarked that "Greer proves a resourceful comedienne, as usual [...]"

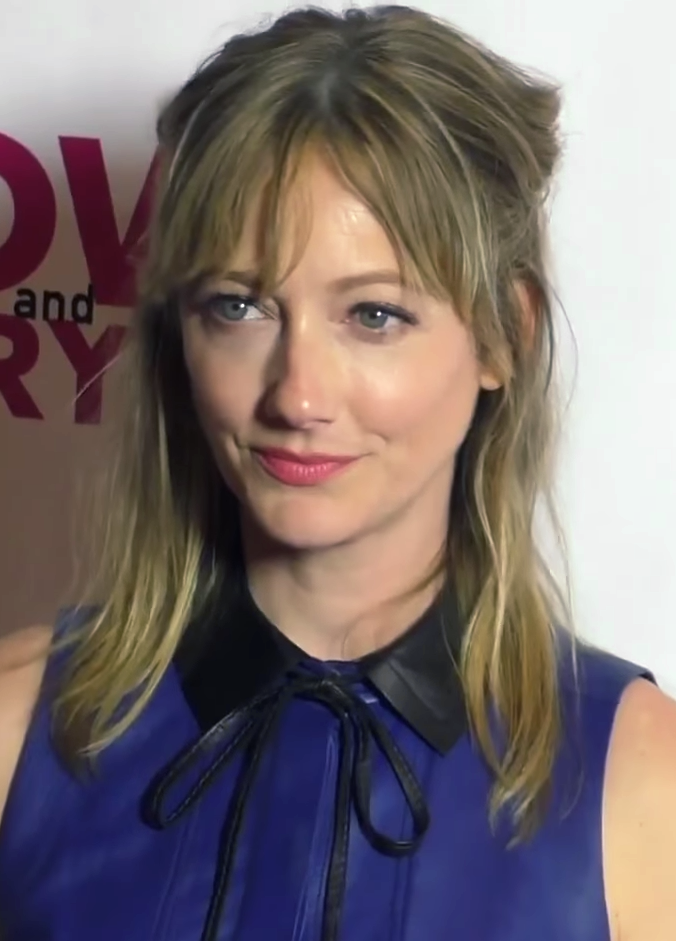
Greer at the premiere of Hedwig and the Angry Inch in 2016

That same year, Greer made her feature-film directorial debut in the comedy-drama A Happening of Monumental Proportions, which depicts one day in the lives of students and staff at a Los Angeles private school. In an interview with Variety, Greer discussed her motivations towards making the film: "I wanted to tell a story where adults act like kids and kids act like adults [...] As I age I'm noticing that more and more, as we see our kids pointing things out to us that we really should know ourselves, you start to realize that you and your adult friends are king of acting like idiots sometimes. We're regressing, clawing at the walls as if to say, I don't want to grow up." The film stars Allison Janney, Katie Holmes, Bradley Whitford, Jennifer Garner (Greer's co-star from 13 Going on 30) and rapper Common, received largely negative reviews from critics.

In 2018, Greer first played a supporting role in Clint Eastwood's biographical film The 15:17 to Paris, as the mother of U.S. Air Force Staff Sergeant Spencer Stone. As part of an overall negative response, Tim Grierson of ScreenDaily lamented that Greer and co-star Jenna Fischer were "trapped playing supportive-parent clichés." Greer followed with Jim Loach's comedy-drama Measure of a Man. Mick LaSalle of the San Francisco Chronicle felt she was "wasted" in the role of a mother whose teenage son is experiencing bullying. Greer co-starred in the biographical film Driven, in which she played the wife of a man (Jason Sudeikis), who gets busted by the FBI for trying to smuggle cocaine and subsequently becomes an informant to John DeLorean of DeLorean Motor Company (DMC). The film premiered at the Venice International Film Festival. Guy Lodge of Variety remarked that Greer was "reliably game in a princess-to-patsy part," while Boyd Van Hoeij of The Hollywood Reporter felt that Greer was "especially good" in a scene where she finds a wire on her husband.

Greer starred with Jamie Lee Curtis in Halloween (2018), a direct sequel to John Carpenter's original 1978 horror film, in which she played the daughter of Laurie Strode. The film grossed $255.6 million worldwide, breaking numerous box-office records, most notably for having the second-highest opening weekend in the month of October and for being the highest-grossing film of the franchise. Halloween was also well received by critics; Eric Kohn of IndieWire felt that while Greer was "underutilized" in the film, she "nevertheless provides a warm antidote to Curtis' stern resolve", while Jonathan Barkan of Dread Central considered Greer's role to be "vital" to the story, and that she played it "wonderfully." Several media outlets considered a scene where Greer's character feigns weakness only to lure Michael Myers and shoot him to be one of the film's highlights. Greer starred in the Showtime comedy-drama series Kidding (2018–2020), opposite Jim Carrey, playing his estranged ex-wife. Karen Han of Vox credited the show's success partly due to its "uniformly terrific performances, particularly Greer's [...]" Greer has also provided the voice of the titular character, Luna, in the PBS children's animated television series Let's Go Luna!.

=== 2019–2022 ===
In 2019, Greer starred in the comedy-drama film Buffaloed, playing a hairdresser whose daughter (Zoey Deutch) becomes a debt collector. The film premiered at the Tribeca Film Festival to positive reviews. Kristy Strouse of Film Inquiry remarked, "Greer, who has proven to always be counted on in any role, is wonderful", and considered her character's relationship with Deutch's character to be "compelling", while Carla Renata of The Curvy Film Critic felt that Greer "flips her comedy prowess upside down while tackling a more serious role with verve and power." Greer appeared in Richard Linklater's comedy-drama film Where'd You Go, Bernadette, starring Cate Blanchett, and the family comedy film Playing with Fire, in which she played the love interest of a commanding officer (John Cena). Neither film was particularly successful with critics nor audiences. For the latter, Steve Davis of the Austin Chronicle bemoaned that "As for Greer's turn [...] she's given the dubious honor of reciting its most memorable – and not in a good way – line, one dispensing advice about child-rearing..."

In 2020, Greer starred in comedy-drama film Uncle Frank, about a gay man living in the 1970s who confronts his past. The film premiered at the Sundance Film Festival to positive reviews. Greer then appeared in the musical romantic comedy Valley Girl, a remake of the 1983 film of the same name, in which she played Julie Richman's mother, in a role originated by Colleen Camp. Greer next guest starred in an episode of the Hulu horror anthology series Into the Dark. In the episode "Good Boy", Greer took on the lead role of Maggie, a woman who adopts an emotional support dog that murders people who escalate Maggie's anxiety. Matt Donato of Slashfilm considered it to be one of the "stronger" episodes in the series, praising it for not "shov[ing] [Greer] into an ancillary role", and stated that Greer "sells her character's midlife crisis and eventual lovestruck relationship with Reuben [...] Greer evokes the blackest comedy notes as she tiptoes around police investigations and scolds Reuben for devouring her problems."

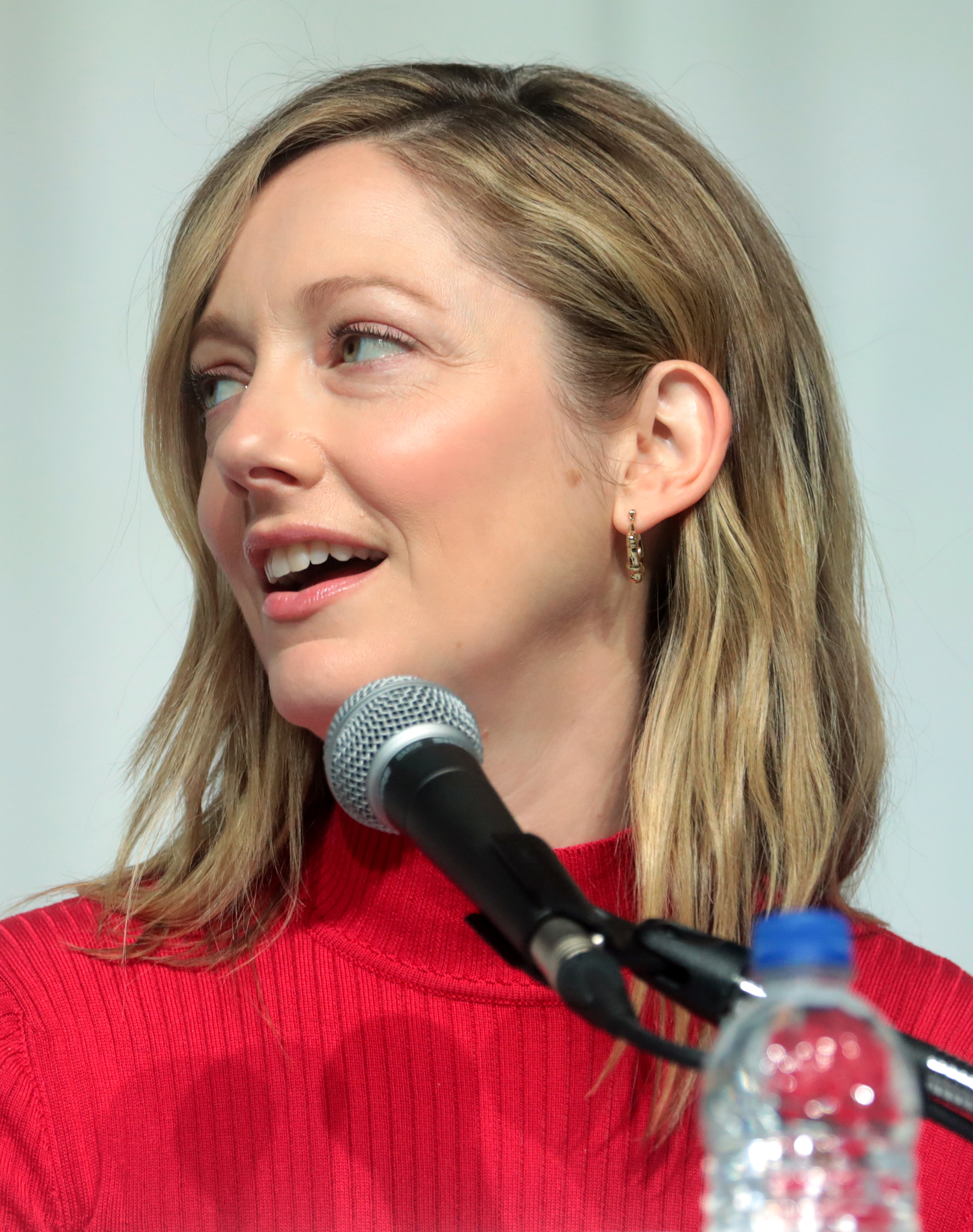
Greer promoting Archer at Wondercon in 2019

In 2021, Greer starred in the comedy film Lady of the Manor, alongside Melanie Lynskey, Ryan Phillippe and Justin Long, who made his directorial debut in the film. Greer played Lady Wadsworth, a ghost who resides in a historic mansion, where a drug dealer is employed. The film premiered at the Gasparilla International Film Festival. Despite critics largely dismissing the comedy, Greer's performance earned praise. Angie Han of The Hollywood Reporter found Greer's chemistry with Lynskey to be "warm and genuine", while Sarah Bea Milner of Screen Rant remarked that "Greer plays against type, mainly being the straight character to Lynskey's over-the-top antics [...] Greer imparts a lot of personality on a role that easily could have felt stilted or wooden in less capable hands." Greer next provided the voice of Martha Washington in Netflix's adult animated film America: The Motion Picture, which received negative reviews from critics.

Greer reprised her role as Karen Nelson in Halloween Kills, which takes place the same night as its predecessor. The film premiered at the Venice International Film Festival, grossing $131.6 million worldwide. Brian Truitt of USA Today considered the film to be a step back in the franchise, but was nonetheless impressed by Greer's performance, "with Karen proving herself worthy of the Strode name." Greer's films of 2022, Three Months, Family Squares and Hollywood Stargirl, were released directly to streaming services and were positively received by critics. In the lattermost, Greer played Ana Carraway, the mother of young singer Susan "Stargirl" Carraway, replacing Sara Arrington. Courtney Howard of Variety commended Greer for bringing "depth and dimension to Ana, providing a nuanced sense of parental guilt in balancing dreams with pragmatic reality." Greer also lent her voice to the Netflix animated film My Father's Dragon, which premiered at the BFI London Film Festival.

That same year, Greer played supporting roles in two miniseries, The Thing About Pam and The First Lady, receiving praise for both performances. In The Thing About Pam, Greer portrayed the real-life Leah Askey, the Lincoln County prosecutor who tried Russ Faria twice for the murder of his wife, Betsy, which was actually committed by neighbor Pam Hupp (Renée Zellweger). Liam Matthews of TVGuide felt that Greer "perfectly played [Askey] with spiteful ineptitude," whereas Gwen Ihnat of The A.V. Club described Greer's performance as "uncharacteristically wily [...] refusing to admit that she may have fingered the wrong guy and crafting any number of implausible theories to make that accusation stick. The series garnered strong ratings for NBC, and Greer received a Hollywood Critics Association award nomination for Best Supporting Actress in a Broadcast Network or Cable Limited Series. In Showtime's The First Lady, Greer replaced Pamela Adlon as Nancy Howe, the personal confidant of First Lady Betty Ford (Michelle Pfeiffer). While the series received mixed reviews, Meghan O'Keefe published an article on Decider asserting that Greer "[almost] single-handedly" saved the series, further stating that "Greer might be the only actor in the whole cast who is able to make the didactic, obvious dialogue sound natural and fun."

Also in 2022, Greer starred in the Hulu comedy series Reboot as Bree Marie Jensen, a former sitcom actress who subsequently reprises her role when the series gets rebooted. The series premiered to positive reviews, with Greer receiving high praise for her performance. Tom Long of The Detroit News remarked that "All the actors are in fine form, but Greer still manages to stand out, building a Bree that's self-involved and silly but still a bit sexy and warm." Carrie Wittmer of Uproxx commented on how Greer was given the opportunity to play a substantial leading role as opposed to an insignificant supporting role, writing "While Greer's all-consuming warmth and vitality give even the dullest [...] movie a lifeline, Greer is consistently underused, with roles that barely scratch the surface of what she's capable of or roles that almost do but not quite [...] As Bree Marie Jensen, Greer is doing what she does best: being both confident and anxious, fast-talking in her signature high, comforting voice, and bouncing off her co-stars." The series was canceled after one season.

=== 2023–present ===
Greer joined the cast of the HBO miniseries White House Plumbers, which depicts the Watergate scandal. Greer was cast as Fran Liddy, the wife of G. Gordon Liddy (Justin Theroux). She starred in Chicago in the play Another Marriage at the Steppenwolf Theatre. She was set to star in the sports drama film Flint Strong, a biographical sports drama based on the life of Claressa Shields. In 2024, she starred as Grace Bradley in The Best Christmas Pageant Ever, an inspirational comedy based on the book of the same name.

In 2024, it was announced that Greer would play the ex-wife of Marc Maron in the comedy feature, In Memoriam. In 2025, Greer appeared with Owen Wilson and reunited with Maron in the Apple TV+ series Stick, playing Amber-Linn, Wilson's supportive ex-wife.

In 2026, she performed the lead role of Jessica Lipki in the dark comedy crime film Chili Finger.

== Personal life ==
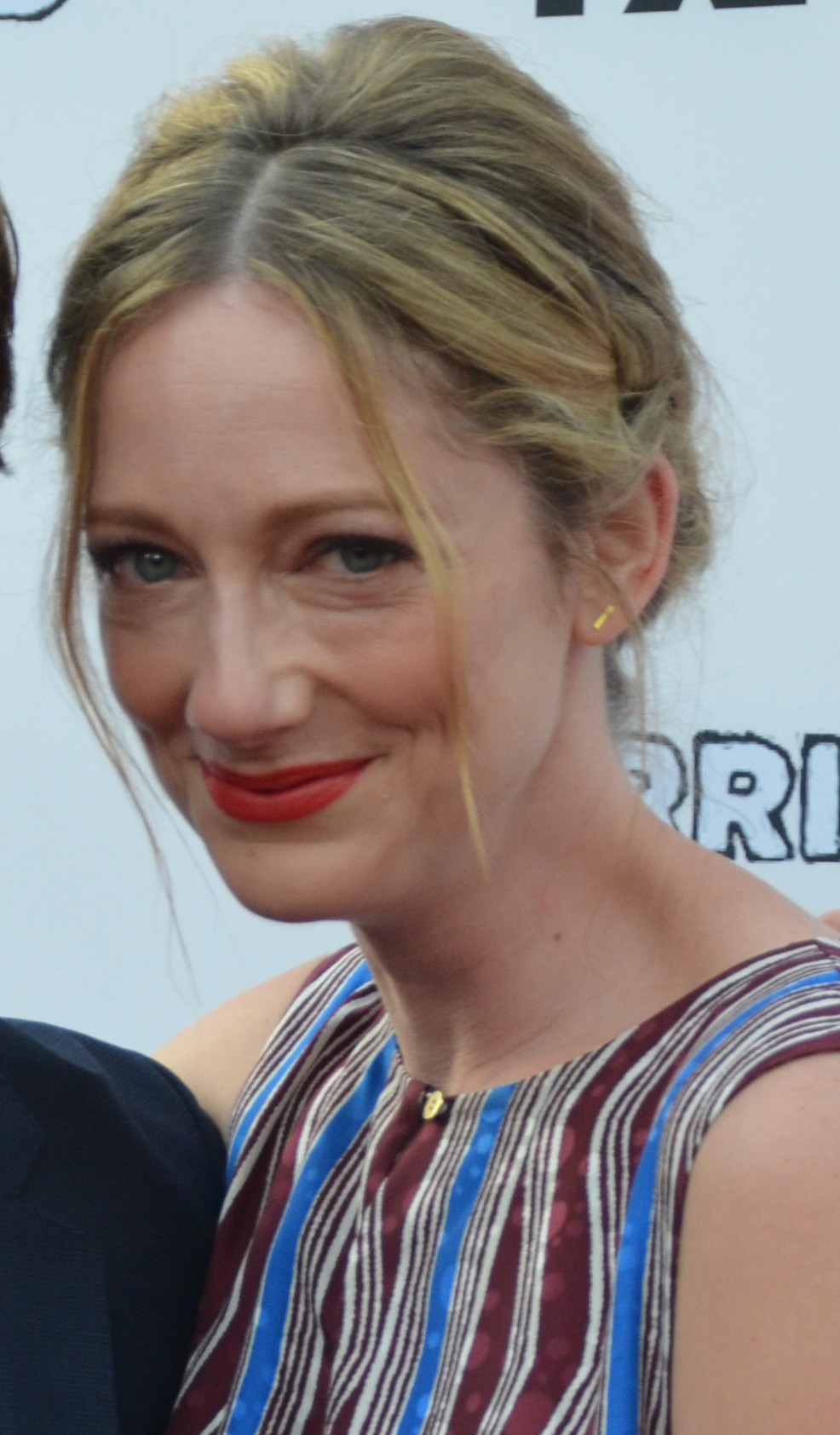
Greer in July 2014

In 2011, Greer married Dean E. Johnsen, an executive producer of Real Time with Bill Maher, becoming the stepmother to his two children from an earlier marriage.

Greer grew up Catholic, although at the age of 10 in 1985, she convinced her parents to let her go to a Presbyterian church, claiming that she thought she would be closer to God there. The real reason was that she thought the boys were cuter at that church. In 2014, Greer stated that she was no longer a Catholic.

In 2014, she told Glamour, "I had been wanting to try to learn how to meditate, and I did research on the different types of meditation. TM seemed the easiest, and I liked that it wasn't religious in any way."

Greer is a member of the board of directors of Project Chimps, a sanctuary for former research chimpanzees.

She is a registered Democrat.

== Filmography ==
Greer has over 150 credits to her name in film and television.

== Awards and nominations ==
Year	Association	Category	Work	Result	Ref.
2004	Teen Choice Awards	Choice Movie Villain	13 Going on 30	Nominated	
2011	Denver Film Festival Awards	John Cassavetes Award	—N/a	Won	
2011	Gotham Awards	Best Ensemble Performance	The Descendants	Nominated	
2011	Satellite Awards	Best Actress in a Supporting Role	The Descendants	Nominated	
2012	Screen Actors Guild Awards	Outstanding Performance by a Cast in a Motion Picture	The Descendants	Nominated	
2012	Critics' Choice Movie Awards	Best Acting Ensemble	The Descendants	Nominated	
2012	Columbus Film Critics Association	Best Ensemble	The Descendants	Nominated	
2012	Annie Awards	Voice Acting in a Television Production	Archer	Nominated	
2013	Behind the Voice Actors Awards	Best Vocal Ensemble in a Television Series - Comedy/Musical	Archer	Nominated	
2014	Behind the Voice Actors Awards	Best Vocal Ensemble in a Television Series - Comedy/Musical	Archer	Nominated	
2016	Online Film & Television Association	Best Voice-Over Performance in an Animated Program	Archer	Nominated	
2021	New Mexico Film Critics Association	Best Supporting Actress	Halloween Kills	Nominated	
2022	Hollywood Critics Association Television Awards	Best Supporting Actress in a Broadcast Network or Cable Limited Series, Anthology Series, or Movie	The Thing About Pam	Nominated	
