= Keith Calder =

American film producer (born 1979)

- Born: 14 December 1979 (age 46); London, England
- Occupation: Film producer
- Years active: 2004–present
- Notable work: Bunraku, The Wackness
- Website: keithcalder.com

Keith G. Calder (born 14 December 1979) is a British-born independent film producer best known for his work on All the Boys Love Mandy Lane (2006) and The Wackness (2008) with Felipe Marino and Joe Neurauter.

== Career ==
After graduating from the University of Southern California (USC) Peter Stark Producing Program in 2004, Calder and fellow Stark graduates Felipe Marino and Joe Neurauter set up a production company, Occupant Films, in 2005. According to Calder, he joined together with Marino and Neurauter because "If you're by yourself in the industry, it's easy to convince yourself you're doing well. Having partners allows you to get an objective view." Through USC's writing division, the three producers found their first script, All the Boys Love Mandy Lane by Jacob Forman, within a week of starting the company. After its completion, the film was screened at the 2006 Toronto International Film Festival and was bought by The Weinstein Company, though it was re-sold and has yet to be released in the United States. Occupant Films' second project was The Wackness, written and directed by Jonathan Levine, with whom the trio had worked on All the Boys Love Mandy Lane. Working with Levine for a second time, Calder said that "We want to continue working with strong, creative partners and build a long, lasting relationship with them." Neurauter commented that "We saw a lot doors open once we sold Mandy Lane, but it's a whole different level to have a movie [The Wackness] released. It gives you a totally different perception in the community." Marino said that, having produced two feature films, "The goal in the upcoming years is to do two to three movies per year." In 2008, he was named one of Variety's "10 Producers to Watch" alongside Marino and Neurauter.

Calder produced Bunraku, a 2010 noir martial arts live action/animation hybrid film, written and directed by Guy Moshe, and starring Josh Hartnett, Woody Harrelson, Ron Perlman, Kevin McKidd, Demi Moore and Gackt. He produced Peep World, directed by Barry W. Blaustein in 2010. With Marino and Neurauter, he produced, The Key Man by Peter Himmelstein in 2011. He produced 2016's horror sequel Blair Witch.

He teaches a producing course, "The Negotiation Game", at USC.

== Personal life ==
Calder was born in London, though he now lives in Los Angeles. His biggest source of inspiration as a producer is Mike Nichols' 1967 film The Graduate, "because it's a smart, strong, personal vision and story but appealing and accessible to a wide, mainstream audience". Calder is the son of billionaire record executive and businessman Clive Calder.

== Filmography ==
- All the Boys Love Mandy Lane (2006) (executive producer)
- Battle for Terra (2007)
- The Wackness (2008)
- Bunraku (2010)
- Peep World (2010)
- Undocumented (2010)
- POM Wonderful Presents: The Greatest Movie Ever Sold (2011)
- The Key Man (2011)
- You're Next (2011)
- The Guest (2014)
- Faults (2014)
- Better Living Through Chemistry (2014) (executive producer)
- Dude Bro Party Massacre III (2015) (executive producer)
- Anomalisa (2015) (executive producer)
- The Devil's Candy (2015)
- Blair Witch (2016)
- Super Size Me 2: Holy Chicken! (2017)
- Blindspotting (2018)
- Little Monsters (2019)
- Corporate Animals (2019)
- One Night in Miami... (2020)
- Blindspotting (2021)
- It Ends (2025) (executive producer)
- Firewatch (film) (TBA)
