= David Corenswet =

American actor (born 1993)

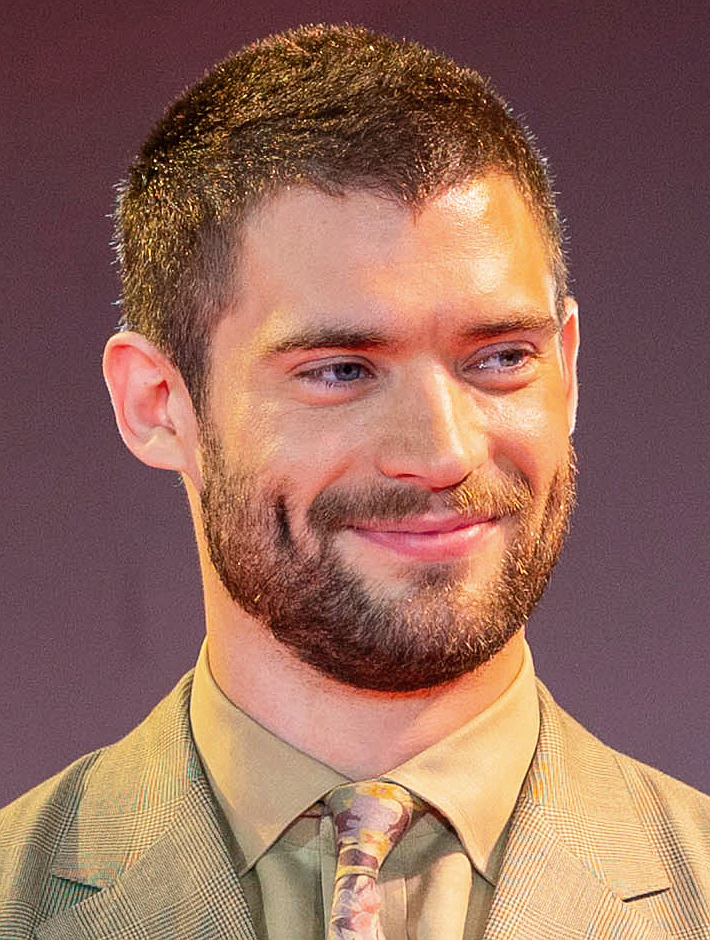
- Corenswet in 2025
- Born: David Packard Corenswet; July 8, 1993 (age 33); Philadelphia, Pennsylvania, U.S.
- Education: Juilliard School (BFA)
- Occupation: Actor
- Years active: 2002–present
- Spouse: Julia Best Warner (m. 2023)
- Children: 1
- Relatives: Edward Packard (grandfather)

David Packard Corenswet (/ˈkɔːrənswɛt/; born July 8, 1993) is an American actor. After graduating from The Juilliard School in 2016, he began guest-starring in television series, including House of Cards in 2018. He played lead roles in the Netflix series The Politician (2019–2020) and Hollywood (2020), both created by Ryan Murphy. In 2022, he starred in the films Look Both Ways and Pearl, and the HBO miniseries We Own This City. After supporting roles in the film Twisters and the miniseries Lady in the Lake (both 2024), he rose to prominence with his portrayal of the titular superhero in James Gunn's DC Universe (DCU) film Superman (2025).

== Early life and education ==
David Packard Corenswet was born on July 8, 1993, in Philadelphia, Pennsylvania, and grew up there and in Lower Merion with his older sister Amy. His father, John Corenswet, was from a Jewish family in New Orleans, and worked as a stage actor in New York City for many years before becoming a lawyer. His mother is also a lawyer. His maternal grandfather is author Edward Packard, creator of the Choose Your Own Adventure book series.

Corenswet graduated from the Shipley School and attended the University of Pennsylvania for a year before transferring to the Juilliard School, where he earned a Bachelor of Fine Arts in drama in 2016.

== Career ==
=== Beginnings (2002–2018) ===
As a child actor, Corenswet appeared in numerous professional theater productions, including the Arden Theatre's 2002 production of Arthur Miller's All My Sons, the Philadelphia Shakespeare Festival's 2003 production of Macbeth, the Walnut Street Theatre's 2003 production of La Vie En Bleu, and the People's Light and Theatre Company's 2004 production of The Forgiving Harvest, among others. Corenswet wrote the screenplay for and acted in Following Chase (2011), directed by Greg Koorhan. He next co-wrote, produced, and starred in a two-season sketch-comedy web series, Moe & Jerryweather (2014–2016) along with fellow Juilliard grad Adam Langdon. In 2016, director Rob Reiner cast Corenswet as a co-lead in his planned television series, The Tap, set at Yale College in 1969. Corenswet played a student. USA Network ordered the pilot episode, which was filmed in 2017, but declined to pick up the series.

In Corenswet's first film role after graduating from Juilliard, he starred as Michael Lawson in Affairs of State (2018), a political thriller. The film also stars Thora Birch, Mimi Rogers, and Adrian Grenier. Los Angeles Times described the film as "well-acted". Corenswet then appeared in several guest-star roles, including in House of Cards, Elementary, and Instinct.

=== Rising popularity (2019–present) ===
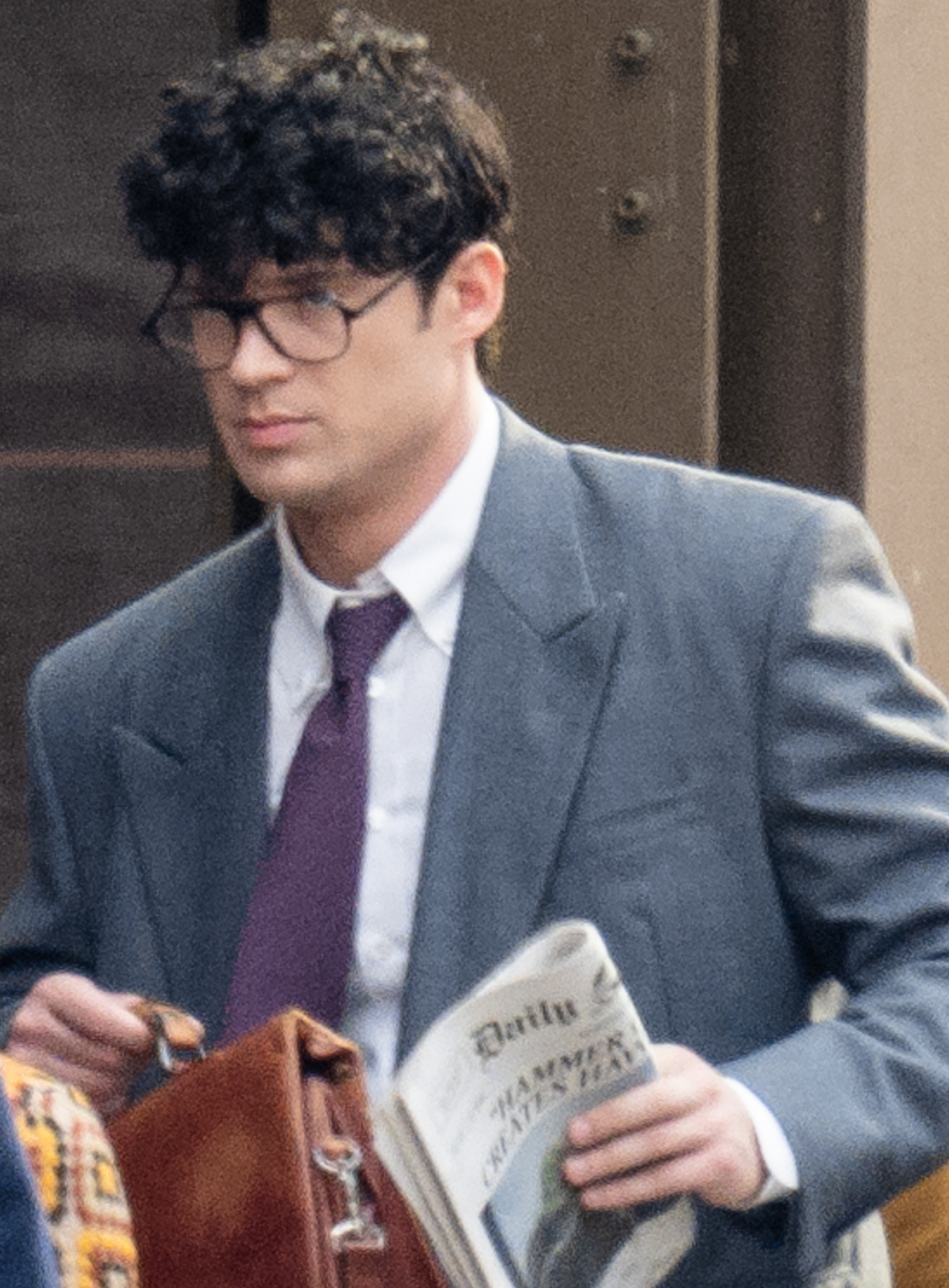
Corenswet as Clark Kent on the set of Superman in 2024

In Netflix's The Politician (2019–2020), directed by Ryan Murphy, he portrayed River Barkley, the lover and high-school political rival of Payton Hobart (Ben Platt). Vanity Fair described River as a "wealthy, sporty, straight-A student". Corenswet next starred as Jack Castello in Hollywood (2020), a Netflix limited series about the post-World War II film business in Los Angeles. The project reunited him with Ryan Murphy and Ian Brennan, the creators of The Politician. Corenswet was also an executive producer on the series. Men's Health magazine praised Corenswet's performance as that of a "breakout lead". IndieWire called it "another star-proving turn from David Corenswet."

In We Own This City (2022), a fact-based HBO limited series from The Wire's writers and executive producers David Simon and George Pelecanos, Corenswet co-starred as the veteran police investigator David McDougall, whose work in 2016 helped uncover years of corruption in the Gun Trace Task Force of the Baltimore police department. Also in 2022, Corenswet co-starred as Jake in Look Both Ways, a Netflix original romantic comedy-drama film. Corenswet then co-starred as The Projectionist in Pearl, a feature film directed by Ti West and released in theaters by A24 in 2022.

Corenswet next portrayed the male lead in a pilot from 20th Television, filmed in January and February 2023: The Answers, FX's adaptation of Catherine Lacey's novel of same name. His character, Christopher Skye, is a charismatic but troubled movie star involved in an enigmatic, futuristic dating experiment.

In 2024, Corenswet co-starred with Lucy Boynton, Justin H. Min, and Austin Crute in The Greatest Hits, a film for Searchlight Pictures written, directed, and produced by Ned Benson. Described as a "musical time travel romance," the film premiered at the 2024 SXSW Film & TV Festival. Also in 2024, Corenswet played Scott, a member of a team of tornado chasers, in Twisters, a disaster film. Corenswet also appeared alongside Natalie Portman in the Apple TV+ series Lady in the Lake, directed by Alma Har'el.

A few years earlier, in a November 2019 interview, Corenswet had said that portraying Superman was his "pie-in-the-sky ambition," and that, while he loved the dark and gritty version of Superman in Man of Steel (2013), he hoped to eventually see a bright and optimistic version of the character. In June 2023, that ambition was realized: He was cast as the titular superhero in the DC Studios film Superman by director James Gunn. The first live-action film in the DC Universe (DCU), it was released in theaters in July 2025 and received widespread critical praise. On August 6, 2026, it was announced that, for his performance in that movie, Corenswet had won the Critics' Choice Super Award for Best Actor in a Superhero Movie. He reprises the role in the 2026 film Supergirl, and in the upcoming 2027 film Man of Tomorrow.

In October 2024, Corenswet was cast in Jonathan Levine's upcoming film Mr. Irrelevant as football player John Tuggle, the last player chosen in the 1983 NFL draft. The film is set to be released by Paramount Pictures on Christmas Day, 2026.

In June 2026, it was announced that Corenswet will make his Broadway debut in a revival of Richard Greenberg's Pulitzer Prize-finalist play, Three Days of Rain. François Arnaud and Yvonne Strahovski will co-star, and Anna D. Shapiro will direct. The production is set to open in February 2027.

== Personal life ==
In March 2023, Corenswet and Julia Best Warner were married at Immaculate Conception Church in New Orleans. It was an interfaith wedding ceremony that included both his wife's Catholic customs and his father's Jewish customs. It was officiated by a priest and a rabbi. They have one daughter, born in 2024; in April 2025 it was reported that they had moved back to Pennsylvania to raise her. Corenswet has stated that he was raised Buddhist, but "not in a religious sense", and that his family went to a mindfulness retreat center for a week every summer when he was growing up.

== Filmography ==
Key
†	Denotes films that have not yet been released

=== Film ===
Year	Title	Role	Notes	Ref.
2011	Following Chase	Ted	Short film	
2018	Affairs of State	Michael Lawson		
2019	The Sunlit Night	Scott Glenn		
2022	Look Both Ways	Jake		
2022	Pearl	The Projectionist		
2024	The Greatest Hits	Max Enders		
2024	Twisters	Scott		
2025	Superman	Kal-El / Clark Kent / Superman, Ultraman		
2026	Supergirl	Kal-El / Clark Kent / Superman		
2026	Mr. Irrelevant †	John Tuggle	Post-production	
2027	Man of Tomorrow †	Kal-El / Clark Kent / Superman	Post-production	

=== Television ===
Year	Title	Role	Notes	Ref.
2014–2018	Moe & Jerryweather	Jerryweather	17 episodes; also editor & producer	
2015	One Bad Choice	Reggie Shaw	Episode: "Reggie Shaw"	
2017	Elementary	Houston Spivey	Episode: "High Heat"	
2017	The Tap	Kirk Lewis	Episode: "Pilot"	
2018	Instinct	Spencer Baymoore	Episode: "Live"	
2018	House of Cards	Reed	Episode: "Chapter 72"	
2019–2020	The Politician	River Barkley	11 episodes	
2020	Hollywood	Jack Castello	Miniseries, 7 episodes; also executive producer	
2020	Acting for a Cause	Romeo Montague	Episode: "Romeo and Juliet"	
2022	We Own This City	David McDougall	Miniseries, 6 episodes	
2024	Lady in the Lake	Allan Durst	Miniseries, 4 episodes	

=== Theatre ===
Year	Title	Role	Venue	Notes	Ref.
2002	All My Sons	Bert	Arden Theatre, Philadelphia		
2003	Macbeth	Young Macduff	Philadelphia Shakespeare Festival		
2003	La Vie En Bleu	Pablito	Walnut Street Theatre		
2004	The Forgiving Harvest	Great	People's Light and Theatre Company, Malvern		
2005	The Street of Useful Things		Act II Playhouse, Ambler		
2008	Our Town	Joe Crowell / Si Crowell / Townsperson	Arden Theatre, Philadelphia		
2008	Waiting for the Ship from Delos	Lyntos	American Philosophical Society Franklin Hall, Philadelphia	World premiere	
2013	Hapgood	Merryweather	Williamstown Theater Festival Nikos Stage, Williamstown		

== Awards and nominations ==
Year	Association	Category	Nominated work	Result
2020	Black Reel Awards for Television	Outstanding TV Movie/Limited Series	Hollywood	Nominated
2025	Indiana Film Journalists Association	Best Lead Performance	Superman	Nominated
2025	Georgia Film Critics Association	Breakthrough Award	Superman	Nominated
2026	Saturn Awards	Best Actor	Superman	Nominated
2026	Golden Schmoes Awards	Best Actor of the Year	Superman	Nominated
2026	Online Film & Television Association	Best Breakthrough Performance: Male	Superman	Nominated
2026	Critics' Choice Super Awards	Best Actor in a Superhero Movie	Superman	Won
2026	Nickelodeon Kids' Choice Awards	Favorite Movie Actor	Superman	Nominated
