= Peep World =

2010 film by Barry W. Blaustein

- Theatrical release poster
- Directed by: Barry W. Blaustein
- Written by: Peter Himmelstein
- Produced by: Keith Calder; Felipe Marino; Joe Neurauter
- Starring: Judy Greer; Michael C. Hall; Taraji P. Henson; Kate Mara; Ron Rifkin; Ben Schwartz; Sarah Silverman; Lesley Ann Warren; Rainn Wilson
- Cinematography: Tobias Datum
- Edited by: Jeff Werner; Evan Schiff; Steve Welch
- Music by: Jeff Cardoni
- Production company: Occupant Films
- Distributed by: IFC Films
- Release dates: September 15, 2010 (TIFF); March 25, 2011 (United States)
- Running time: 79 minutes
- Country: United States
- Language: English
- Box office: $14,351

Peep World is a 2010 American comedy-drama film directed by Barry W. Blaustein and written by Peter Himmelstein. It stars Judy Greer, Michael C. Hall, Taraji P. Henson, Kate Mara, Ron Rifkin, Ben Schwartz, Sarah Silverman, Lesley Ann Warren and Rainn Wilson.

The story revolves around the Meyerwitz family causing trouble for each other after the youngest member reveals each member's secrets in his novel. It premiered at the 2010 Toronto International Film Festival on September 15, 2010, and was theatrically released by IFC Films on March 25, 2011. Peep World garnered a negative reception from critics.

== Plot ==
At a dinner celebrating the 70th birthday of their father Henry Meyerwitz, tensions among the four Meyerwitz siblings explode thanks to the success of the youngest son, Nathan, whose new novel Peep World is a thinly veiled portrait of the family. The best-selling expose reveals the oldest, "responsible" son, Jack, as a porn addict, the daughter, Cheri, as a catty drama queen, and the third son, Joel, as a living disaster with a loony plan to change his life.

The story takes place over the course of a single day. Jack, a struggling architect, is stressed about the well-being of his wife and unborn son. Cheri, an actress, wants to sue Nathan for damages since she is unable to get work. Joel, an incompetent divorce lawyer, juggles mounting financial troubles while maintaining a relationship with his client Mary. Nathan finds little happiness with his success due to the ongoing turmoil. Jack's pregnant wife Laura discovers him masturbating in an adult video store. Cheri continues to rant about the book and upcoming movie, but decides to attend the dinner with her religious friend Ephraim. Joel misses Mary's divorce hearing. After being given a shot for premature ejaculation issues, Nathan causes a scene during his book signing with an unwanted erection. After his publicist Meg helps him "relieve" his problem, she reluctantly accompanies him to his father's birthday dinner.

The four siblings meet at the restaurant along with their mother Marilyn. Everyone is surprised when their father introduces his new girlfriend Amy, who is not only half his age, but also the actress playing Cheri in the film adaptation of the book. The family quarrels during dinner. Henry deems his children ungrateful and reveals that Amy is pregnant. Marilyn claims the children always blame someone else for their problems. The dinner ends abruptly when Henry chokes on a piece of food. Jack performs CPR, and the family rushes him to the hospital.

While waiting, Cheri asks, "What do we do if he dies?" Jack replies, "We'll live." A doctor appears to give the family news. A narrator then explains that Henry finally got his family together, though he almost died for that to occur.

== Cast ==
- Lewis Black as the narrator
- Ron Rifkin as Henry Meyerwitz
- Rainn Wilson as Joel Meyerwitz
- Taraji P. Henson as Mary
- Sarah Silverman as Cheri Meyerwitz
- Stephen Tobolowsky as Ephraim
- Nicholas Hormann as Ted
- Lesley Ann Warren as Marilyn
- Judy Greer as Laura
- Michael C. Hall as Jack Meyerwitz
- Kate Mara as Meg
- Ben Schwartz as Nathan Meyerwitz
- Troian Avery Bellisario as a film set P.A.
- Alicia Witt as Amy Harrison
- David Packer as Eli
- Deborah Pratt as Cassandra Williamson
- Octavia Spencer as Alison
- Geoffrey Arend as Dr. Novak
- Guillermo Diaz as Jesus
- Lester Speight as Wizdom
- Raja Fenske as Rajeev

== Release ==
=== Box office ===
Peep World premiered at the Toronto International Film Festival (TIFF) on September 15, 2010. IFC Films bought the film's distribution rights after its premiere at TIFF, released it on video on demand on February 9, 2011, and gave it a limited release on March 25. On its opening weekend, the film grossed $6,702 from three theatres, averaging $2,234 per theater and ranking number 84 at the box office. The film earned a total gross of $14,351 in under three weeks of release, with a widest release of five theatres.

== Reception ==
On the review aggregator website Rotten Tomatoes, 24% of 29 critics' reviews are positive, with an average rating of 3.6/10. Metacritic, which uses a weighted average, assigned the film a score of 27 out of 100, based on nine critics, indicating "generally unfavorable" reviews.

Jesse Cataldo of Slant Magazine criticized the film for telling predictable storylines with unlikable characters that try to be sympathized in a last act redemption, concluding that: "By then, Peep World has spent so much time abusing and reviling its characters that it's impossible to see them as anything but useless." Sheri Linden of the Los Angeles Times said the script falters with "excruciating" humor and affection among the characters "feeling false than touching". Christopher Bell from IndieWire found it "devoid of what makes comedy films work," criticizing the unoriginal humor being delivered by the cast and director Blaustein for poorly handling the multiple storylines like he's working on a "mediocre television pilot."

Manohla Dargis of The New York Times praised the performances of Wilson, Henson, Hall and Greer for being the most human in the cast, saying they "help to distract you from the flat jokes, ethnic clichés and formulaic relationships noisily vying for your attention," but found the rest of the film generic, calling it "[A] family circus of dysfunction that's so familiar you may feel tempted to place bets on how everything will shake out." Elizabeth Weitzman of the New York Daily News said that the cast managed to raise the script, highlighting both Greer and Silverman for giving the most genuine dramatic portrayals of their characters.

=== Home media ===
Peep World was released on DVD and Blu-ray on July 19, 2011.
