= Felipe Marino =

American film producer (born 1978)

- Born: 1978 (age 46–47); Pittsburgh, Pennsylvania, U.S.
- Other names: Rose Barreneche; Olga Barreneche
- Occupation: Film producer
- Years active: 2005–present

Felipe Marino (born 1978) is an American independent film producer best known for his work on All the Boys Love Mandy Lane (2006) and The Wackness (2008) with Keith Calder and Joe Neurauter.

== Career ==
Born in Pittsburgh, Pennsylvania, Marino graduated from the Peter Stark Producing Program at the University of Southern California (USC) in 2004 before setting up a production company, Occupant Films, with his fellow USC graduates Keith Calder and Joe Neurauter.

Within a week of its founding, Occupant Films found its first script, All the Boys Love Mandy Lane, by Jacob Forman, through a contact in USC's writing division. After its completion, the film was screened at the 2006 Toronto International Film Festival and was bought by The Weinstein Company. The trio's next project was The Wackness, which was written and directed by Jonathan Levine, with whom the producers had worked on All the Boys Love Mandy Lane. The film won the Audience Award at the 2008 Sundance Film Festival and was subsequently acquired and released by Sony Pictures Classics. The same year, Marino was named one of Variety's "10 Producers to Watch" alongside Calder and Neurauter.

In 2009, he produced Peep World starring Michael C. Hall (Dexter), Sarah Silverman, Rainn Wilson (The Office), Taraji Henson, Ron Rifkin and Kate Mara. The film received a gala premiere at the Toronto Film Festival, where it was acquired by IFC.

In 2012, the company produced Better Living Through Chemistry, starring Sam Rockwell, Jane Fonda, Olivia Wilde, Michelle Monaghan and Ray Liotta. The film was released by Samuel Goldwyn in the US and by Universal internationally.

Marino then wrote and produced an adaptation of Madame Bovary starring Mia Wasikowska, Paul Giamatti, Rhys Ifans, Logan Marshall Green, and rising star Ezra Miller. The film premiered at Telluride and Toronto Film Festivals, and was released by Alchemy (formerly Millennium Entertainment) on June 12, 2015. Most recently, he co-wrote and produced The Hallow, a horror film directed by Corin Hardy. The film had its world premiere in January 2015 at the Sundance Film Festival. IFC acquired the North American rights to the film, and it will be released on November 13, 2015. For the writing of both these films, Marino wrote under the pseudonym of Rose Barreneche for the latter, and Olga Barreneche for the former.

In addition to film, Marino produced Occupant's docu-series Behind the Mask, which follows the lives and careers of sports mascots.

== Filmography ==
- The Hallow (2015)
- Behind the Mask (2013–2015)
- Madame Bovary (2014)
- Better Living Through Chemistry (2014)
- The Key Man (2011)
- Peep World (2010)
- The Wackness (2008)
- All the Boys Love Mandy Lane (2006)
