= The Key Man (2011 film) =

- Film poster
- Directed by: Peter Himmelstein
- Written by: Peter Himmelstein
- Produced by: Keith Calder; Felipe Marino; Joe Neurauter
- Starring: Jack Davenport; Hugo Weaving; Brian Cox
- Cinematography: Darren Genet
- Edited by: Glenn Garland; Joe Landauer; Josh Noyes
- Music by: Terence Blanchard
- Production company: Occupant Films
- Distributed by: Screen Media Films
- Release date: March 19, 2011 (South by Southwest)
- Running time: 80 minutes
- Country: United States
- Language: English

The Key Man is a 2011 American crime thriller film written and directed by Peter Himmelstein and starring Jack Davenport, Hugo Weaving and Brian Cox.

== Plot ==
A previously successful, but currently down on his luck, thirty-something insurance salesman is targeted by an aging gangster and his sociopathic business partner, who is also a Shakespearean actor. The salesman is lured into an illegal insurance deal with the promise of cash that will enable him to buy a new house for his family. Of course the deal goes sideways and violence ensues.

== Cast ==
- Hugo Weaving as Vincent
- Brian Cox as Irving
- Jack Davenport as Bobby
- Judy Greer as Karen
- Ben Shenkman as Martin
