= Madame Bovary (2014 film) =

2014 film

- Us theatrical release poster
- Directed by: Sophie Barthes
- Written by: Felipe Marino; Sophie Barthes
- Based on: Madame Bovary; 1857 novel by Gustave Flaubert
- Produced by: Felipe Marino; Joe Neurauter; Sophie Barthes; Jaime Mateus-Tique
- Starring: Mia Wasikowska; Rhys Ifans; Ezra Miller; Logan Marshall-Green; Henry Lloyd-Hughes; Laura Carmichael; Olivier Gourmet; Paul Giamatti
- Cinematography: Andrij Parekh
- Edited by: Mikkel E.G. Nielsen
- Music by: Evgueni Galperine; Sacha Galperine
- Production companies: Occupant Entertainment; A Company Filmproduktion; Left Field Ventures; Scope Pictures
- Distributed by: Alchemy (United States); A-Film Benelux (Belgium); Warner Bros. Pictures (Germany)
- Release dates: August 30, 2014 (Telluride Film Festival); June 12, 2015 (United States); September 2, 2015 (Belgium); December 17, 2015 (Germany)
- Running time: 118 minutes
- Countries: Germany; Belgium; United States
- Languages: English; French; Latin

Madame Bovary is a 2014 historical romantic drama film directed by Sophie Barthes, based on the 1856 novel of the same name by French author Gustave Flaubert. The film stars Mia Wasikowska, Rhys Ifans, Ezra Miller, Logan Marshall-Green, Henry Lloyd-Hughes, Laura Carmichael, Olivier Gourmet, and Paul Giamatti.

== Plot ==
Emma, a young woman who is not yet 18 years old, packs up her belongings and prepares to leave the convent to marry the man her farmer father has arranged as her husband: country doctor Charles Bovary. However, she becomes bored and miserable in the small, provincial town of Yonville. She spends most of her time alone, reading or wandering in the garden while Charles tends to patients. Even when he is home, Emma feels bored or neglected by Charles.

Emma longs for more — excitement, passion, status, and love. She shows restraint at first, when smitten law clerk Leon Dupuis skittishly professes his affections for her. However, she is intrigued by the dashing Marquis, who makes more overt advances. Their affair emboldens her as she believes it gives her a glimpse of the good life. She spends money she does not have on lavish dresses and decorations from the obsequious dry-goods dealer Monsieur Lheureux, who is all too happy to continue extending her credit.

== Cast ==
- Mia Wasikowska as Emma Bovary
- Henry Lloyd-Hughes as Charles Bovary
- Ezra Miller as Leon Dupuis, one of Emma's lovers
- Paul Giamatti as Monsieur Homais, the local pharmacist
- Rhys Ifans as Monsieur Lheureux
- Logan Marshall-Green as the Marquis or Rodolphe Boulanger in the novel
- Olivier Gourmet as Monsieur Rouault
- Laura Carmichael as Henriette

== Production ==
In March 2012, it was reported that Mia Wasikowska had been cast in a film to be directed by Sophie Barthes. Ezra Miller joined the cast in May and Rhys Ifans in October 2012. Laura Carmichael, Olivier Gourmet, and Logan Marshall-Green were linked to the project in September 2013. Filming began on September 30, 2013, in Normandy. Filming took place in the Orne department, including on the streets of Mortagne-au-Perche, Bellême, La Perrière, at the Château de La Pellonnière in Le Pin-la-Garenne, at the Sées Cathedral and in the gardens of the Palais d'Argentré in Sées.

Joe Neurauter and Felipe Marino of Occupant Entertainment produced the film in association with director Sophie Barthes' production company Aden Films and Jaime Mateus-Tique from Aleph Motion Pictures.

Warner Bros. secured all German-speaking rights to the film from A Company Filmed Entertainment in April 2014.

On September 9, 2014, one day before its Telluride Film Festival debut, Millennium Entertainment acquired the U.S. distribution rights to the film.

== Reception ==
Madame Bovary received mixed reviews. On Rotten Tomatoes, the film holds a 43% score based on 69 reviews, with an average rating of 5.7/10. The film's consensus reads: "Over the years, Flaubert's Madame Bovary has proven an exceedingly difficult novel to film - and this version adds another disappointing entry to the list." The film holds a score of 52 out of 100 on Metacritic, based on reviews from 19 critics, indicating 'mixed or average reviews'.
