= Andrew Mondshein =

American film editor and director

- Born: February 28, 1957 (age 69)
- Occupation: Film Editor

Andrew Steven Mondshein (born February 28, 1957) is an American Film editor and director with more than 25 motion picture credits. He was widely recognized for his editing of the film The Sixth Sense (M. Night Shyamalan, 1999); he was nominated for the Academy Award, the BAFTA Award, the ACE Eddie, and he won the Satellite Award.

== Early life ==
Mondshein grew up on the east coast of the United States and received a Bachelor's degree from the University of Florida.

== Career ==
His first credits are as an assistant editor on two 1982 films directed by Sidney Lumet, Deathtrap and The Verdict. He went on to edit five of Lumet's films between 1984 and 1992. Mondshein was among the first film editors to adopt electronic techniques on the film Power.

Mondshein has had a notable collaboration with the Swedish director Lasse Hallström. Their collaboration commenced with Hallström's first English language film Once Around (1991). It includes Chocolat (2000), which was nominated for the Academy Award for Best Picture, and for which Mondshein was nominated for a second Eddie. Their most recent collaboration is The Hundred-Foot Journey (2014). Because of his concurrent work on The Sixth Sense, Mondshein played only a peripheral role in Hallström's The Cider House Rules (1999), edited by Lisa Zeno Churgin. The film was nominated for seven Academy Awards including Film Editing.

Mondshein has been elected to membership in the American Cinema Editors.

== Filmography ==
=== Feature films ===
| Year | Film | Director | Other notes |
|---|---|---|---|
| 1982 | Deathtrap | Sidney Lumet | Assistant Editor |
| 1982 | The Verdict | Sidney Lumet | Assistant Editor |
| 1983 | Daniel | Sidney Lumet | |
| 1984 | Garbo Talks | Sidney Lumet | |
| 1985 | Desperately Seeking Susan | Susan Seidelman | |
| 1986 | Power | Sidney Lumet | |
| 1987 | Making Mr. Right | Susan Seidelman | |
| 1988 | Running on Empty | Sidney Lumet | |
| 1989 | Cookie | Susan Seidelman | |
| 1989 | Family Business | Sidney Lumet | |
| 1991 | Once Around | Lasse Hallström | |
| 1991 | Final Verdict | Jack Fisk | |
| 1992 | A Stranger Among Us | Sidney Lumet | |
| 1993 | What's Eating Gilbert Grape | Lasse Hallström | |
| 1994 | Jason's Lyric | Doug McHenry | |
| 1995 | To Wong Foo, Thanks for Everything! Julie Newmar | Beeban Kidron | |
| 1997 | Swept from the Sea | Beeban Kidron | Co-edited with Alex Mackie |
| 1998 | Wide Awake | M. Night Shyamalan | |
| 1998 | Return to Paradise | Joseph Ruben | Co-edited with Craig McKay |
| 1999 | The Sixth Sense | M. Night Shyamalan | Satellite Award for Best Editing; Nominated — Academy Award for Best Film Editing; Nominated — BAFTA Award for Best Editing; Nominated — American Cinema Editors Award for Best Edited Feature Film – Dramatic; Nominated — ACCA for Best Film Editing |
| 2000 | Chocolat | Lasse Hallström | Nominated — ACE Eddie for Best Edited Feature Film - Comedy or Musical |
| 2000 | Lost Souls | Janusz Kamiński | Original film edited by Anne Goursaud. Serves as editor for re-cut of the film |
| 2001 | The Shipping News | Lasse Hallström | |
| 2002 | Analyze That | Harold Ramis | |
| 2005 | An Unfinished Life | Lasse Hallström | |
| 2005 | Casanova | Lasse Hallström | |
| 2006 | The Hoax | Lasse Hallström | |
| 2007 | Feast of Love | Robert Benton | |
| 2009 | Cold Souls | Sophie Barthes | |
| 2009 | Everybody's Fine | Kirk Jones | |
| 2010 | Remember Me | Allen Coulter | |
| 2012 | The Odd Life of Timothy Green | Peter Hedges | |
| 2013 | Safe Haven | Lasse Hallström | |
| 2014 | The Hundred-Foot Journey | Lasse Hallström | |
| 2015 | A Tale of Love and Darkness | Natalie Portman | |
| 2015 | Freeheld | Peter Sollett | |
| 2017 | The Mummy | Alex Kurtzman | Co-edited with Gina Hirsch and Paul Hirsch |
| 2017 | American Made | Doug Liman | Co-edited with Dylan Tichenor and Saar Klein |
| 2020 | Ma Rainey's Black Bottom | George C. Wolfe | |
| 2021 | Chaos Walking | Doug Liman | |
| 2022 | Deep Water | Adrian Lyne | Co-edited with Tim Squyres |
| 2023 | Rustin | George C. Wolfe | |
| 2024 | A Quiet Place: Day One | Michael Sarnoski | Co-edited with Gregory Plotkin |
| 2026 | Killing Castro | Eif Rivera | |
| 2026 | The Death of Robin Hood | Michael Sarnoski | |

=== Television ===
| Year | Title | Distributor | Episodes |
|---|---|---|---|
| 1991 | Women & Men 2 | HBO Films | —N/a |
| 1995 | The Barefoot Executive | Walt Disney Pictures | —N/a |
| 1997 | Dellaventura | CBS | Episode 4: "Joe Fallon's Daughter"; Episode 5: "Clean Slate" |
| 1998 | Evidence of Blood | MGM | —N/a |

=== Documentary ===
| Year | Title | Director | Other notes |
|---|---|---|---|
| 2008 | Flow: For Love of Water | Irena Salina | Co-edited with Caitlin Dixon and Madeleine Gavin |

== See also ==
- List of film director and editor collaborations
