= Look Both Ways (2022 film) =

2022 American romantic comedy-drama film

- Official release poster
- Directed by: Wanuri Kahiu
- Written by: April Prosser
- Produced by: Bryan Unkeless; Eric Newman; Jessica Malanaphy
- Starring: Lili Reinhart; Danny Ramirez; David Corenswet; Aisha Dee; Andrea Savage; Luke Wilson; Nia Long
- Cinematography: Alan Caudillo
- Edited by: Brad Leach
- Music by: Drum & Lace; Ian Hultquist
- Production companies: Screen Arcade; CatchLight Studios
- Distributed by: Netflix
- Release date: August 17, 2022
- Running time: 110 minutes
- Country: United States
- Language: English

Look Both Ways is a 2022 American romantic comedy-drama film directed by Wanuri Kahiu and written by April Prosser. The film stars Lili Reinhart, Luke Wilson, Andrea Savage, Aisha Dee, Danny Ramirez, David Corenswet, and Nia Long.

Natalie's life diverges into two parallel realities on the eve of her college graduation: in one her one-time intimate encounter with her close friend Gabe leaves her pregnant so she remains in her hometown to raise her child and in the other the pregnancy test is negative so she moves to LA to pursue her dream career.

Look Both Ways was released on August 17, 2022, by Netflix and received mostly positive reviews.

== Plot ==
During her senior year at the University of Texas, Natalie has sex with her friend Gabe, with both agreeing not to "make it a big deal". A few weeks later, on the night of their graduation, Natalie feels sick, so her best friend Cara gets her pregnancy tests. When Natalie takes them, her life diverges into two parallel realities based on the result, the film showing both stories at the same time.

Positive test

In the reality where Natalie's test is positive, she moves back home with her mom and dad, who are less than thrilled and unimpressed with Gabe's status as an aspiring musician. They encourage Natalie to still pursue her dream career in animation while she struggles with the realization that she will soon be a mother.

Natalie and Gabe struggle to coparent as their daughter Rosie is born. He wants them to move in with him, but she does not agree so encourages him to date. Although later she expresses remorse about doing so in a conversation with Cara. Gabe begins a relationship with a woman named Miranda, making Natalie uncomfortable.

When Natalie visits Cara and her girlfriend in LA, she gets a call from Rosie who says she is left overnight with a stranger. She rushes back, much to Cara's disappointment, and finds out that Gabe has proposed to Miranda. Natalie throws herself into her artwork. Thanks to this, she has a career breakthrough. Natalie gets accepted to the South by Southwest film festival in Austin where she sits on a panel of creators including Lucy and discusses a comic inspired by Rosie.

Natalie and Rosie also watch Gabe's band perform at a bar. Afterwards, she asks him why Miranda is not at the gig. Gabe tells her that he broke off the engagement because he is in love with her, not Miranda. Gabe and Natalie have a serious conversation about how they would like to develop their relationship.

Negative test

Natalie moves to Los Angeles with Cara and they start building their careers. She applies to be an assistant to animator Lucy Galloway. After pining for the job, she gets an offer, and forms a strong bond with her colleague Jake. They encourage each other to follow their dreams, with him desiring to be a successful movie producer.

Natalie and Jake develop a strong romantic relationship and consider moving in together. That is, until he receives a year-long job producing in Nova Scotia. They try long distance, but Natalie finds it is not working for her as Jake is always busy with work.

When Natalie shows Lucy her portfolio, she is given some very critical notes, saying her work is unoriginal. She encourages her to quit to find her voice, so she does. Natalie returns home to a friend’s baby shower with Cara, feeling like a failure. Then she has a career breakthrough, getting accepted to the South by Southwest film festival in Austin, where her short film is showcased.

Natalie sees Gabe’s band in a bar, catching up with him after five years. He reveals he is married. She reminisces on their night together, sharing how she took a pregnancy test after they hooked up, and jokes about how differently their lives would be if it had been positive.

Later, she is surprised that Jake has traveled to see her short film, despite risking his job with the movie. Lucy sees Natalie’s short and encourages her to reconnect when she returns to Los Angeles.

Both realities converge when each of the couples walk past Natalie’s sorority house, where she took the pregnancy test. In both realities, Natalie walks up into the bathroom, looks into the mirror, and reassures herself that things worked out before leaving.

== Cast ==
- Lili Reinhart as Natalie Bennett
- Danny Ramirez as Gabe
- David Corenswet as Jake
- Aisha Dee as Cara, Natalie's bestfriend
- Andrea Savage as Tina Bennett, Natalie's mother
- Luke Wilson as Rick Bennett, Natalie's father
- Nia Long as Lucy Galloway
- E.A. Castillo (credited as Elisa Annette) as Shay Tenzie
- Amanda Knapic as Miranda
- Jacqueline and Francine Seaman as Rosie

== Production ==
In March 2021, Netflix announced that the film, then known as Plus/Minus, would star Lili Reinhart, who would also serve as an executive producer. In June 2021, Luke Wilson, Andrea Savage, Aisha Dee, Danny Ramirez, and David Corenswet were added the cast. In August 2021, Nia Long joined the cast.

Principal photography began on June 21, 2021, and concluded on August 8, 2021, in Austin, Texas. Filming also took place in Los Angeles, California. In early 2022, reshoots for the film took place at the Vancouver Public Library, Pacific Coffee Roasters, and the Acquafarina restaurant in downtown Vancouver, British Columbia.

The film was released on August 17, 2022, with a runtime of 110 minutes.

== Reception ==
On the review aggregator website Rotten Tomatoes, 62% of 42 critics' reviews are positive, with an average rating of 5.9/10. Metacritic, which uses a weighted average, assigned the film a score of 49 out of 100, based on 11 critics, indicating "mixed or average" reviews.

Courtney Howard of Variety wrote that, "While the filmmakers' heads and hearts are in the right place with their resonant sentiments on taking risks and embracing fate, their execution of narrative basics proves lackluster." On San Francisco Chronicle, Mick LaSalle rated it 2.5 out of 5 stars, writing that, "It flows easily. The situations are interesting, in a general sort of way. And Reinhart is a pleasant person to be around for 100 or so minutes."

== See also ==
- Sliding Doors (1998)
