= Bunraku (film) =

- US theatrical poster
- Directed by: Guy Moshe
- Screenplay by: Guy Moshe
- Story by: Boaz Davidson
- Produced by: Keith Calder; Ram Bergman; Nava Levin; Jessica Wu
- Starring: Josh Hartnett; Woody Harrelson; Gackt; Kevin McKidd; Ron Perlman; Demi Moore
- Narrated by: Mike Patton
- Cinematography: Juan Ruiz Anchía
- Edited by: Zach Staenberg; Glenn Garland
- Music by: Terence Blanchard
- Production companies: Snoot Entertainment; Bergman Productions; Picturesque Films
- Distributed by: ARC Entertainment; XLrator Media
- Release dates: September 11, 2010 (TIFF); September 30, 2011 (United States)
- Running time: 125 minutes
- Country: United States
- Languages: English; Japanese
- Budget: $25 million

Bunraku is a 2010 martial-arts action film written and directed by Guy Moshe, based on a story by Boaz Davidson. The film stars Josh Hartnett, Demi Moore, Woody Harrelson, Ron Perlman, Kevin McKidd, and Gackt and follows a young drifter in his quest for revenge.

The title Bunraku is derived from a 400-year-old form of Japanese puppet theater, a style of storytelling that uses 4-foot (1.2 m)-tall puppets with highly detailed heads, each operated by several puppeteers who blend into the background wearing black robes and hoods. The classic tale is re-imagined in a world that mixes skewed reality with shadow-play fantasy. Its themes draw heavily on samurai and Western films.

Bunraku premiered as an official selection of the Midnight Madness section at the 2010 Toronto International Film Festival in Canada, and a limited theatrical release was slated for September 2011.

The movie received negative reviews from critics, who unanimously praised the film for its visual style and ideas, but criticized its screenplay and characterization, being considered as a bad movie "worth watching for those who know what they are getting into".

== Plot ==
In the aftermath of a major global conflict, which caused untold amounts of death and destruction, guns have been outlawed. However, even in spite of there not being firearms anymore, people still continue to fight and kill one another, except now they rely on either bladed weapons or their bare fists.

Nicola the Woodcutter is the most powerful man East of the Atlantic, a shadowy crime boss who rules his territory with an iron fist and his nine elite assassins called "The Killers" with his right-hand man, Killer No. 2, a cold-hearted, smooth-talking murderer in a red hat and armed with deadly cane-sword; and his unwilling lover, Alexandra, a femme fatale with a secret past. The citizens live in fear of Nicola's gang and wait for the hero who can overthrow them.

However, one night, a mysterious Drifter enters the "Horseless Horseman Saloon" and talks to the Bartender, asking for two things: A shot of whisky and a game of cards. However, the Drifter learns the only place in town with both of those things, "The Russian Roulette", is controlled by Nicola and only accepts rich players. Later on, another stranger enters the same bar, a lone samurai by the name of Yoshi; he travelled far and came to this town in order to fulfill his father's dying wish and recover a lost medallion which had been stolen from their village. Armed with crossed destinies, incredible fighting skills and the wisdom of the Bartender, the two eventually join forces to bring down the corrupt reign of Nicola.

After a string of altercations, leading the Drifter and Yoshi to injure several police officers as well as many of Nicola's goons, Killer No. 2 slays Yoshi's uncle and kidnaps his cousin, Momoko to work in Nicola's brothel. In retaliation, the pair teams up with the Bartender and a whole army of freedom fighters to invade Nicola's palace. As the Bartender rescues Momoko, he's briefly reunited with his long-lost love, Alexandra only for her to tragically be lost amidst the falling debris of the now burning brothel.

Meanwhile, after defeating several of Nicola's Killers, Yoshi faces off against Killer No. 2 and manages to fatally stab him while the Drifter advances toward Nicola, who proceeds to severely injure him, throwing an axe directly into his chest when his guard is down. However, despite his exhaustion from his previous battles and the injury he suffered, the Drifter doesn't give up and proceeds to slash Nicola's throat open with an arrowhead taken from Yoshi. As he stands over his fallen foe, the Drifter reveals the truth to a dying Nicola, explaining that his real motive for coming here was to avenge his father, whom Nicola had killed in an underhanded way.

With the reign of the Woodcutter and his gang finally brought to an end and Yoshi recovering his clan's medallion, the heroes part ways, hoping to meet each other again.

== Cast ==
- Josh Hartnett as The Drifter
- Gackt as Yoshi, a swordsman from Japan who speaks a little English
- Woody Harrelson as The Bartender
- Kevin McKidd as Killer No. 2, a sadistic monster who acts as Nicola's lieutenant
- Ron Perlman as Nicola "the Woodcutter", a crime boss and the most powerful man "East of the Atlantic"
- Demi Moore as Alexandra, a courtesan and Nicola's lover
- Jordi Molla as Valentine
- Shun Sugata as Uncle, Yoshi's Uncle
- Mike Patton as The Narrator
- Mark Ivanir as Eddie

== Production ==
=== Development ===
Following the completion of his first feature film, Holly, Moshe started working on the initial concept art for Bunraku in 2006. The first drafts of the screenplay were largely inspired by Westerns and martial arts movies, of which Moshe is a huge fan. In a 2010 interview, Moshe revealed that he first "sold the script for Bunraku to a production company... When it became clear that they would not film it, I bought it back." Moshe was asked in a 2007 interview on the subject of his future projects. "My next film is called Bunraku and it is an action-fantasy circus ride into man's fascination with violence. It has a sort of a Spaghetti Western, samurai movie feel and it's going to be built and shot entirely on a stage so it couldn't be more different than Holly, maybe 180 degrees from it actually. Like Holly, it also aspires to go a little beyond the pure entertainment factor, but I think that, all in all, I would like to be the kind of filmmaker who can tell and make more than one story or one type of genre. I feel like in the past an auteur was a person who constantly challenged himself, where, today, because of the fierce competition and growing difficulty of making different and unique films, filmmakers can get stuck in a certain style and movie genre and keep recreating the same films. It takes two years of your life to make a movie, and to me that's priceless. If I am gonna spend that kind of time pouring my blood and tears into it, then I wanna make sure I learn something on the way. That is what life is all about anyhow, I guess, growing and learning and then realizing you know nothing at all."

The $25m action film is produced by Moshe's Los Angeles-based Picturesque Films and Ram Bergman Productions, and is fully financed by Keith Calder's Snoot Entertainment. Snoot Entertainment was founded in February 2004 to independently develop, finance and produce both commercial genre-oriented live-action films and CG animated features with broad audience appeal. In a 2008 interview, Calder said. "I've always loved movies in the 'no-name stranger' coming to town and ending up in a bigger struggle (genre)... I think [Bunraku] is an opportunity to take this genre and spin it on its head and bring a unique and strong visual style to it." Acclaimed production designer Alex McDowell is co-producing the film. Asked about his first production in a 2009 interview, McDowell said he "met with Moshe, the director of Bunraku, and his producer Nava Levin a couple of years ago, originally to consult with them. His project was such an interesting and provocative blend of genres and technique that I got hooked and helped them to set up an innovative approach to pre-production that integrated pre-visualization, storytelling and design into a new fluid and low budget workspace for the creative team. The story is set on a theatre stage in a folded paper world where Russian gangsters, cowboys and samurai warriors come together in inevitable and never-ending battle. It's an elegantly choreographed dance of revenge, honor and friendship...It's cool!" IM Global is handling worldwide sales.

=== Visual development ===
Snoot FX, a division of Snoot Entertainment, and Origami Digital LLC are responsible for all the animation and visual effects work on Bunraku. The movie mixes CGI and practical sets to create the world of Bunraku. In a 2008 interview, Hartnett, who was instrumental in getting the film Sin City made, compared the look of Bunraku to Alfred Hitchcock's Rope, in that it will play out (or at least appear to play out) in one long, unedited take. Hartnett explained "It's in the vein of Sin City or something like that, where the world doesn't look like reality at all...Some of the scenes are gonna be more Michel Gondry-like I guess but a lot of them will be green screen as well...It's not fantasy. Well, I mean, it's not Narnia. It's a film that, I don't know how to stick it into a genre, but I would say it's more a film like Sin City than anything else." In a 2010 interview, actor McKidd revealed that Bunraku "is a hybrid of a western and a martial arts film. The world it's set in is almost circus-like in the feel of it and it's all origami. The whole universe is constantly folding paper to create a cityscape or interiors of rooms or the sunrise." In a 2009 interview, McDowell, better known as the production designer of major Hollywood successes such as Minority Report, The Terminal or Fight Club, indicated that in Bunraku the production was using "the idea that the movement in the camera work should dictate the set, rather than the set design in any way limiting the action. So, if a character performed a kick which needed a physical context such as a wall, that wall would be provided in the design. In this way, the actors should have a total freedom of space in which to work and to give of their best." McDowell's special value to Bunraku as a salesman has been front-loaded. The pre-visual content that he made to show during the 2008 Festival de Cannes helped director Moshe to double the amount of anticipated investment in the production.

=== Casting ===
Hartnett confirmed his involvement as the lead character The Drifter in an interview at the 2008 Sundance Film Festival while promoting his film August. Hartnett stated "I'm going to Romania to shoot this film called Bunraku...All the cast isn't set yet, but it's going to be a lot of really interesting actors, in this weird kind of papier-mâché world...I've been trying to do as much artistic fare as I can and things that are compelling to watch as well...It's a story of revenge...My character is called 'The Drifter', and he comes into this world that doesn't look like anything like you've ever seen before...[The script] has a lot of fight sequences in it, but it's more about these crazy characters...Like my character, he's a gypsy and he's coming into town and he's got something to prove and no one really knows what he's about."

In April 2008, Moore was confirmed to be joining the cast as the courtesan Alexandra. Interviewed at the 2009 Middle East International Film Festival, Moore described Bunraku as a "big action adventure". "It has tremendous special effects," she enthused. In May 2008, Harrelson and Perlman were announced to be joining the cast. Harrelson was set to play The Bartender, one of the protagonists, while Perlman was signed to the role of Nicola the Woodcutter, powerful warrior and crime boss, who is the central focus of vengeance for the film's protagonists. Bunraku marks the first time that Moore and Harrelson have worked together since the 1993 film Indecent Proposal. When asked in a 2010 interview how he had managed to sign two international stars like Harrelson and Moore onto an experimental film, Moshe explained "They really liked [Moshe's film] Holly and responded immediately to the Bunraku script."

McKidd plays Killer No. 2, the right-hand man of Nicola and a deadly assassin. Describing his character in a 2010 interview, McKidd said, "I play a very effeminate, master killer who's almost like a Fred Astaire tap-dancing his way through the movie. It's so different than anything I've done." McKidd further revealed, "It'll be a very interesting film. Moshe, who also directed, wrote what I thought was one of the strangest scripts I'd ever read, especially because the story takes place in an in-depth CGI universe. It's very allegorical – a mixture of a samurai film and a western in a virtual origami universe where everything is made of folding paper, and there's a lot of martial arts in it...I thought Bunraku was interesting enough to be in. I play the main killer of the movie who's hunting down Hartnett's character under the instruction of Ron Perlman's character, Nicola. They've been doing the effects for the last 19 months. But then this is an independent film, not Avatar. I'm really excited to see Bunraku."

On April 23, 2008, Japanese singer Gackt was confirmed for the role of Yoshi, a samurai warrior seeking vengeance against Nicola. Although he has starred in Japanese television drama and feature films, Bunraku was his first acting experience in an international-flavored movie. Gackt came to the attention of Moshe through his role in the 2007 television historic drama Fūrin Kazan, a year-long series produced by NHK. In this series, he portrayed the heroic warlord Uesugi Kenshin, winning him accolades, not only for his acting performance, but also for the music single "Returner ~Yami no Shūen~" and the video for the same that were inspired by his role. Moshe personally went to Japan to convince Gackt to join the project.

=== Filming ===
Filming for Bunraku began on April 17, 2008, on a budget of $25 million and continued over the course of 12 weeks at the MediaPro Studios in the town of Buftea in Romania. In a 2009 interview, producer Ram Bergman was asked about the choice of the shooting location, stating "we needed a lot of stages available because the whole movie is green-screen and we had to build 30-something sets. We needed to take control of a space for five months... [Romania] was probably 10%-20% cheaper than Prague. We did not want to pay top dollar, like you would pay in London or, to a lesser degree, in Prague or Hungary... Media Pro Studios had the most stages available [in Romania]. Bergman continued "we brought in heads of departments but the rest of the [film] crew was Romanian.

A wrap-up party was organised at the Terminus Club in Bucharest at the end of June 2008.

=== Post production ===
Brazilian-born filmmaker Guilherme Marcondes was hired to develop an animated opening sequence for the film, described as a "short [film] before the main feature". Marcondes described the project as "an interesting project with a lot of animation techniques, and the director of the feature Moshe is letting me do my own thing. A rare circumstance, so I'm glad to be doing it."

== Crew ==
- Guy Moshe – Director/Writer
- Keith Calder – Producer
- Ram Bergman – Producer
- Nava Levin – Producer
- Jessica Wu – Producer
- Chris Farmer – Production designer
- Juan Ruiz Anchía – Cinematographer
- Zach Staenberg – Editor
- Glenn Garland – Editor
- Terence Blanchard – Composer
- Mary Vernieu – Casting
- Donna Zakowska – Costume design
- Scott Hecker – Sound editor
- Larnell Stovall – Fight choreographer
- Clayton J. Barber – Stunt Coordinator
- Jeremy Kenyon Lockyer Corbell – Quantum Jujitsu and Martial Arts Consultant
- Oliver Hotz – Visual Effects producer
- Dane Allan Smith – Visual Effects supervisor

== Release ==
=== Festival screenings ===
Event	Section	Location	Date(s)	Ref.
Toronto International Film Festival	Midnight Madness	Toronto, Ontario, Canada	September 11, 2010 – September 14, 2010 – September 17, 2010	
Fantastic Fest	Premiere Screenings	Austin, Texas, United States	September 26, 2010 – September 27, 2010	
Mumbai International Film Festival	World Cinema	Mumbai, India	October 24, 2010	
Tokyo International Film Festival	Special Screenings	Tokyo, Japan	October 27, 2010 – October 29, 2010	
Dubai International Film Festival	Cinema of the World	Dubai, United Arab Emirates	December 17, 2010	
Hong Kong International Film Festival	I See It My Way	Hong Kong, China	March 31, 2011 – April 5, 2011	
ActionFest	Action Cinema	Asheville, North Carolina, United States	April 9, 2011 – April 10, 2011	
AM² West Coast Anime Convention	Summer Festival	Anaheim, California, United States	July 3, 2011	
Otakon	Premieres	Baltimore, Maryland, United States	July 29, 2011	
Lund International Fantastic Film Festival	World Cinema	Lund, Sweden	September 21, 2011	
Boston Film Festival	Closing Night	Boston, Massachusetts, United States	September 22, 2011	

=== Theatrical release ===
ARC Entertainment, the US distributor for the film, announced on July 5, 2011, that Bunraku will be available on Video on Demand on September 1, 2011, and in theaters on September 30, 2011. The official trailer for the film premiered on G4 TV's Attack of the Show! which aired on July 20, 2011.

== Critical reception ==
Bunraku received negative reviews from critics. On the review aggregator website Rotten Tomatoes, 18% of 22 critics' reviews are positive, with an average rating of 4.2/10. The website's consensus reads: "Bunraku admirably strives for visual panache, but the staging, acting, and effects are dismal with a complete lack of excitement." On Metacritic, the film received a weighted average score of 28 out of 100 based on 11 critics, indicating "generally unfavorable" reviews.

Kirk Honeycutt of The Hollywood Reporter concluded that it is "like a sumptuous banquet in which every course is dessert — in other words, too much of a good thing. Intriguing in its design and eye-popping with its fight choreography, this cartoonish film aspires to Hong Kong martial arts by way of spaghetti westerns, video games and samurai films. Moshe, who wrote and directed, creates a boldly Expressionistic alternate reality to background this heavy-on-the-action story, but neglects narrative and character beyond the most basic strokes". Tim Grierson of Screen Daily criticized Hartnett for lacking "much charisma or dark heroism", Harrelson for turning his character "into an ironic dispenser of wisdom and smart-alecky commentary ... that it's all he'll be doing", Moore not succeeding giving her character a "gravitas", and only highlighted Perlman for being "the only one in the cast who can do it without breaking a sweat" and Gackt who "comes closest to nailing Bunraku's casually detached spirit". Chris Tilly of IGN concluded it "looks amazing, the universe he has created utterly unique and original, like a pop-up book brought to life ... that's not to say that Bunraku is a total disaster, the film certainly deserving of credit for its ambition. Indeed, from a technical point-of-view it's little short of a masterpiece, a feast for the eyes throughout".

Scott Mendelson of The Huffington Post pointed out that "the film is certainly a case of style over substance, and the utter lack of substance may be fatal for some viewers. But the picture boasts a unique visual palette and some interesting ideas ... Bunraku is not quite a good film, but it is surely a bad one worth watching for those who know what they are getting into".

Gave Toro of IndieWire gave it C grade saying that "the characters are nothing if not slaves to the story, themes and visual vocabulary. Mostly due to the green-screen matte work, none of the characters' surroundings feel real, and the few sets that have been erected are purposely flimsy, both overly theatrical and dependent on shadows... what pleasures arise from this film lie mostly in the extensively choreographed fight sequences, respectfully captured through clear-eyed static shots geared towards exploring the spatial dimensions between fighters". Alison Willmore of The A.V. Club also rated it C because "Bunraku comes up frustratingly empty, and just as many of its elements simply bloat an overlong run time ... It looks good, but Bunraku feels like a Frankenstein's monster of references that someone failed to animate". Eric Hynes of Time Out gave the movie 2/5 stars, saying that all the visual, camera, sound and other "service a story so nonsensically convoluted that voiceover exposition ... only compounds the confusion". John Hartl of The Seattle Times described it as "essentially one long, extensively choreographed fight sequence ... that a brawl just becomes a brawl becomes a brawl". Joe Neumaier of the New York Daily News gave the film one out of five stars, saying, "it should surprise no one that visually quirky, graphic-novelish, pulp-noir action flicks rarely come through the sausage machine intact". Dennis Harvey of Variety also disliked the film, calling it "a pic that's akin to a terrarium of plastic flowers -- gaudily decorative, but airless and lifeless". Similarly, Andy Webster of The New York Times said that "everything feels secondhand in Guy Moshe's Bunraku, a potpourri of genres that ends up a morass of clichés", and Robert Abele of Los Angeles Times how "no image or moment is grounded – every shot is augmented with restless animation, smart-ass narration or video game sounds. The artificiality of it all is smothering".
