= The Wackness =

2008 film by Jonathan Levine

- Theatrical release poster
- Directed by: Jonathan Levine
- Written by: Jonathan Levine
- Produced by: Keith Calder; Felipe Marino; Joe Neurauter
- Starring: Ben Kingsley; Josh Peck; Famke Janssen; Olivia Thirlby; Mary-Kate Olsen; Method Man
- Cinematography: Petra Korner
- Edited by: Josh Noyes
- Music by: David Torn
- Production companies: Occupant Films; SBK Pictures
- Distributed by: Sony Pictures Classics
- Release dates: January 18, 2008 (Sundance); August 1, 2008 (United States)
- Running time: 99 minutes
- Country: United States
- Language: English
- Budget: $6 million
- Box office: $3.3 million

The Wackness is a 2008 American coming-of-age comedy-drama film written and directed by Jonathan Levine. The film is a semi-autobiographical account of Levine's life growing up in New York City in the 1990s. It stars Ben Kingsley, Josh Peck, Famke Janssen, Olivia Thirlby, Mary-Kate Olsen, and Method Man. It revolves around a troubled teenage drug dealer who trades pot for therapy sessions with a drug-addled psychiatrist.

The film had its world premiere at the Sundance Film Festival on January 18, 2008, where it won the Audience Award: Dramatic. It was theatrically released in the United States on August 1, 2008, by Sony Pictures Classics. It received positive reviews from critics, but was a box-office bomb, grossing $3.3 million worldwide against a $6 million budget. Levine was nominated for Best First Screenplay at the 24th Independent Spirit Awards.

== Plot ==
In the summer of 1994 in New York City, Luke Shapiro is trading marijuana in exchange for therapy from his psychiatrist, Dr. Jeffery Squires. He graduates from high school but while dealing at a party, he finds out that Justin and most of his class have left for the summer, except for him and his classmate and Squires' stepdaughter, Stephanie "Steph" Squires. When Luke returns home, he finds his parents arguing over money and their probable eviction from their Manhattan apartment.

Luke starts dealing more marijuana to make money for his family. After a session with Squires, he bumps into Steph and invites her to come with him dealing around the city. She has a great time and gives Luke her number so she will not be lonely in the city for the summer.

Luke calls Steph but ends up talking to Squires and they go out to a bar. While getting drunk and high, they get kicked out for underage drinking. Walking back from the bar, Luke and Squires start tagging a wall but are caught by the police.

Steph bails them out of jail and, against Squires' wishes, takes Luke out for the day. They end up kissing. When Luke gets home, he finds he has strong feelings for her.

After Luke learns that his family is getting evicted, Steph invites him to her family's house on Fire Island while Squires and his wife go on a second honeymoon to repair their marriage. On the island, Steph finds out Luke is a virgin and gives him sex lessons.

After taking a shower and having sex together, Luke tells Steph that he loves her. She reacts with astonishment, though Luke fails to realize that she is not interested in a committed relationship. Justin later contacts Steph asking if she wants to hang out.

Luke asks Squires for help selling pot in order to make enough money for college. He introduces Squires to his client, Eleanor, and they hit it off. As Luke's family is evicted and moves in with his grandparents in New Jersey, Luke visits Steph for companionship, only to find her on a date with Justin.

A heartbroken Luke goes to Fire Island to seek counselling with Squires, who is on a bender because his wife left him. While high, he tries to commit suicide by drowning in the sea, but Luke stops him.

Luke later talks with Squires inside the Squires' home and Squires wishes him good luck. As he is leaving, Steph follows him to the elevator to talk to him. However, Luke asks her to not, so he can fully experience heartbreak and he leaves, leaving a regretful Steph behind. As he walks out of the complex, he puts in the mixtape Squires made for him and "All the Young Dudes" by Mott the Hoople begins playing.

In New Jersey, Luke tells his family he plans to become a psychiatrist, wanting to help other people with their problems. Back in the city, Eleanor beeps Squires and they make plans to hook up that night. The film cuts to Luke, who is smoking a joint while waiting at a train stop.

== Cast ==
- Ben Kingsley as Dr. Jeffrey Squires
- Josh Peck as Luke Shapiro
- Famke Janssen as Kristin Squires
- Olivia Thirlby as Stephanie "Steph" Squires
- Mary-Kate Olsen as Union
- Method Man as Percy
- David Wohl as Mr. Shapiro
- Jane Adams as Eleanor
- Talia Balsam as Mrs. Shapiro
- Aaron Yoo as Justin
- Bob Dishy as Grandpa Shapiro
- Joanna Merlin as Grandma Shapiro

== Production ==
Jonathan Levine has said that the film is semi-autobiographical: "'I wish I could say that I sold pot and I had a shrink like Ben Kingsley, but no, it wasn't like that,' admits Jonathan Levine. 'It's the details and the backdrop, and a lot of the perspective of this kid and the way that he looks at the world,' explains Levine. 'The Stephanie character, I guess, is a composite of a few different ladies who broke up with me,' Levine says with a laugh. 'That happened.'"

Filming wrapped up on August 24, 2007. The Wackness was awarded the Audience Award for Dramatic Film at the 2008 Sundance Film Festival.

== Reception ==
=== Box office ===
The Wackness grossed $2.1 million in the United States and Canada, and $1.2 million in other territories, for a worldwide total of $3.3 million.

=== Critical response ===
On the review aggregator website Rotten Tomatoes, 70% of 135 critics' reviews are positive, with an average rating of 6.3/10. The website's consensus reads: "Sympathetic characters and a clever script help The Wackness overcome a familiar plot to make for a charming coming-of-age comedy." Metacritic, which uses a weighted average, assigned the film a score of 61 out of 100, based on 30 critics, indicating "generally favorable" reviews.

Dennis Harvey of Variety opined, "Like Donnie Darko, Thumbsucker and a few others, The Wackness treads the familiar teenage male terrain with assurance and distinction." Harvey also commented, "Peck somewhat oversells the open-mouthed, glaze-eyed stoner act, he's nonetheless a most appealing protagonist." Duane Byrge of The Hollywood Reporter remarked, "The Wackness is a tightly packed entertainment. It explodes through familiar teen-transition territory with dark ironies, but, all the while, touches are sentiments. Under filmmaker Levine's inspired hand, the performances erupt with precise energies." A. O. Scott of The New York Times stated, "The Wackness makes a good-faith effort to steer clear of such clichés, and succeeds and fails in roughly equal measure" and "Levine tries to compensate with a combination of historical authenticity and low-key emotional sincerity." Owen Gleiberman of Entertainment Weekly gave the film an "B-" and described it as "a studiously offbeat coming-of-age crowd-pleaser." Gleiberman also wrote, "The best thing about it is Peck, who shows you the sweet, virginal kid hiding inside the outlaw poseur." Peter Travers of Rolling Stone gave the film 2.5 out of 4 stars and noted, "Thirlby gives a sensual, sassy, breakthrough performance. […] But for all its wicked delights and tasty acting, The Wackness hangs back when you most want it to sting."

== Music ==
Levine wrote in The Dallas Morning News, "Beyond what worked tone-wise, a lot of the music speaks to what's going on in the movie. There's that 'Heaven & Hell' song by Raekwon when Josh is up on a water tower looking down, and it's asking, 'Is high school heaven or is it hell?' And 'Can I Kick It?' by A Tribe Called Quest plays when Kingsley's trying to kick drugs. So a lot of it just kind of worked thematically."

Levine targeted the most iconic acts of the era, with Notorious B.I.G. on the top of his list. Luke and Stephanie bond in Central Park over beer and the sounds of Total Featuring the Notorious B.I.G.'s single "Can't You See". "The What," a song from that album featuring Wu-Tang Clan member Method Man, who also appears in the film as Luke's supplier, leads off the soundtrack. Levine says he considered expanding the film's soundtrack to include Weezer and Smashing Pumpkins, two of the year's biggest non-hip-hop acts, and that the original ending featured Nirvana's Lithium."

Levine added, "Ultimately, tough choices refined the film's reach, which isn't such a bad thing. But that doesn't mean it was easy passing that other music up."

The soundtrack from the Sundance submission edit of the movie differs from the final edit, with several tracks either being shifted, replaced, or cut out of some scenes possibly due to issues of licensing.

=== Soundtrack ===
1. "The What?" -- The Notorious B.I.G. feat. Method Man
2. "You Used To Love Me" -- Faith Evans
3. "Flava in Ya Ear" -- Craig Mack
4. "Summertime" -- DJ Jazzy Jeff & The Fresh Prince
5. "Can't You See" -- Total feat. The Notorious B.I.G.
6. "I Can't Wake Up" -- KRS-One
7. "The World Is Yours" -- Nas
8. "Can I Kick It?" -- A Tribe Called Quest
9. "Heaven & Hell" -- Raekwon
10. "Bump n' Grind" -- R. Kelly
11. "Just a Friend" -- Biz Markie
12. "Tearz" -- Wu-Tang Clan
13. "Long Shot Kick De Bucket" -- The Pioneers

== Home media ==
The Wackness was released January 6, 2009 on DVD and Blu-ray.
