= Cold Souls =

- Promotional film poster
- Directed by: Sophie Barthes
- Written by: Sophie Barthes
- Produced by: Dan Carey; Elizabeth Giamatti; Paul Mezey; Andrij Parekh; Jeremy Kipp Walker
- Starring: Paul Giamatti; Dina Korzun; Emily Watson; David Strathairn
- Cinematography: Andrij Parekh
- Edited by: Andrew Mondshein
- Music by: Dickon Hinchliffe
- Distributed by: Samuel Goldwyn Films
- Release dates: January 17, 2009 (Sundance); August 7, 2009 (United States)
- Running time: 101 minutes
- Country: United States
- Languages: English; Russian
- Box office: $1 million

Cold Souls is a 2009 American science fiction comedy-drama film written and directed by Sophie Barthes. The film features Paul Giamatti, Dina Korzun, Emily Watson, and David Strathairn. Giamatti stars as a fictionalised version of himself, an anxious, overwhelmed actor who decides to enlist the service of a company to deep freeze his soul. Complications ensue when his soul gets lost in a soul trafficking scheme which has taken his soul to St. Petersburg. The film then follows Giamatti desperately trying to recover his soul.

== Plot ==
Paul Giamatti is an actor who becomes so impassioned with the characters and roles that he plays that he has trouble disassociating himself from the character after the scene is done. As a result, his mind and spirit are a tangled mass of emotions that he seems to have trouble separating from his own feelings. As he struggles to play Uncle Vanya, he reads an article in The New Yorker regarding "Soul Storage," a procedural clinic that physically removes one's soul from his body.

While hesitant at first to go through with such a procedure, being unsure how it would affect him, Paul decides to go ahead. On visiting the clinic he discovers that most souls come out as gray matter or clouds. He decides to go ahead, declining the offer to look at his soul as it happens. He is distressed to discover that his soul comes out looking just like a chickpea. He has it stored in the clinic and returns to his life with 5% of his soul remaining. He is told this is like residue, enough to leave him with some emotional reaction, like affection for his loved ones and hobbies but not very deep or complex feeling to new things. He at first feels more relaxed, however his life begins to fall apart; he has trouble associating with or making love to his wife Claire despite wanting to. Lacking in emotional intelligence in new situations, he is easily bored and says insensitive things, such as telling a friend to just "pull the plug" on her comatose mother, and his acting for the Chekhov play lacks believability. Not wanting his soul back just yet, he instead obtains the soul of what he is told is a Russian poet, whose memories entice him to be curious about her and her life as well as obtain a curiosity of his own. This Russian soul allows him to play Uncle Vanya excellently, but the experience overwhelms him and he decides to get his own soul back.

Paul's world is turned upside down when Nina, a Russian soul mule who transports people's souls to and from Russia, steals Paul's soul for the wife of her boss at the Russian soul-storage operation, who aspires to be an actress. She receives Paul's soul, believing it to be the soul of Al Pacino. Her acting and happiness improve. Nina, the mule who carried Paul's soul and has become curious about him, eventually reveals the whereabouts of his soul, helping him to get it back. As the pair investigate the soul of Olga the poet, which he had 'rented' during this period, they learn that she committed suicide after not being able to get it back after selling it. Paul and Nina get his soul back, and after looking into it through the use of special goggles to reassociate himself to it, he returns to New York a happier man. Nina's soul is found, but Paul is told that it is unrecoverable due to the residues of souls that she has carried.

== Cast ==
- Paul Giamatti as Paul Giamatti
- David Strathairn as Dr. Flintstein
- Dina Korzun as Nina
- Emily Watson as Claire Giamatti
- Katheryn Winnick as Sveta
- Lauren Ambrose as Stephanie
- Sergey Kolesnikov as Dimitri
- Michael Tucker as Theater Director
- Mimi Lieber as Friend at Restaurant
- Lisa Emery as Cynthia
- Boris Kievsky as Oleg
- Oksana Lada as Sasha
- Michael Stuhlbarg as Hedge Fund Consultant

== Production ==
Director Sophie Barthes has stated that she came up with the idea from the film when she had a dream in which she found herself one of several patients at a futuristic doctor's office. According to Barthes, the dream even included Woody Allen and all the patients had a box that an office assistant explained was carrying their extracted souls. Once that was explained to the patients, they began to look in the boxes, but Barthes said she woke up before seeing her own soul. However, she did see the spiritual contents of Woody Allen's box and Barthes says that moment became the inspiration for the film and the Paul Giamatti character.

When Sophie approached Giamatti at the Nantucket Film Festival and pitched him on the film idea, he was ready to sign up on the spot.

The film was shot in New York City, United States and Saint Petersburg, Russia.

The song “Potsilunok” (“The Kiss”) by Ukrainian rock band Mertvyj Piven was used as the main soundtraсk to the movie.

== Reception ==
The film has received fairly positive reviews from critics. The film holds a 75% approval rating on review aggregator Rotten Tomatoes, based on 126 reviews, with an average rating of 6.4/10. The website's critics consensus reads: "Straddling existential drama and surrealist comedy, Sophie Barthes debut feature is beautifully shot and full of inventive quandaries." On Metacritic, the film has a weighted average score of 69 out of 100 based on 28 reviews, indicating "generally favorable" reviews.

The story drew comparisons to the film Being John Malkovich, which also centers an actor playing himself. Tasha Robinson of The A.V. Club wrote Barthes' "attempts to find wry comedy in the kind of restrained, hilariously discomfiting mundanity that gave Being John Malkovich its edge (and that characterizes Charlie Kaufman's work in general) come at the expense of any larger observations or humor about what the soul is, or the advantages and impact of soullessness, in L.A. or elsewhere." IndieWire opined that Cold Souls is not as effective a film as the former because it "presumes that we recognize the actor’s persona as fully and immediately as that of, say, John Malkovich. But when we see the actor breathily rehearsing the title role of Uncle Vanya, chewing scenery before the stage has even been set, we realize that Giamatti’s usual character—at least, the one that Cold Souls wishes to exploit—is paper-thin, working better on the periphery than in the center of the narrative."
