= Mr. Irrelevant (film) =

Upcoming film by Jonathan Levine

- Theatrical release poster
- Directed by: Jonathan Levine
- Written by: Nick Santora
- Produced by: David Ellison; Dana Goldberg; Don Granger; Jonathan Levine; Gillian Bohrer; Nick Santora
- Starring: David Corenswet; Isabel May; Michael Shannon
- Cinematography: Frank Lamm
- Edited by: Jeff Groth
- Music by: Kris Bowers
- Production companies: Skydance Sports; Megamix; Blackjack Films
- Distributed by: Paramount Pictures
- Release date: December 25, 2026
- Running time: 125 minutes
- Country: United States
- Language: English
- Budget: $30 million+

Mr. Irrelevant is an upcoming American biographical sports drama film about John Tuggle, who was drafted by the New York Giants as the final selection of the 1983 NFL draft. The film is directed by Jonathan Levine and written by Nick Santora. David Corenswet stars as Tuggle, alongside Isabel May and Michael Shannon.

Mr. Irrelevant is scheduled to be released by Paramount Pictures in the United States on December 25, 2026.

== Cast ==
- David Corenswet as John Tuggle
- Isabel May as Katie
- Michael Shannon as Bill Parcells
- David Krumholtz as Julius "Whitey" Horai
- Tuwaine Barrett as Leonard Marshall
- Thaddeus LaGrone as Lawrence Taylor
- Alexander England
- Spencer House
- Tandi Wright as Anita Faye

== Production ==
The film was announced in October 2023, with Jonathan Levine set to direct and Nick Santora to write the script, and Skydance Sports producing. In October 2024, David Corenswet was in talks to star as John Tuggle. Isabel May was in talks to join in March 2025. Michael Shannon joined the cast as Bill Parcells in April 2025, along with the confirmation of May joining the cast. In June 2025, it was revealed that David Krumholtz had joined the cast.

Principal photography began in April 2025 in Victoria, Australia, with locations including Melbourne and Geelong. The Kardinia Park Stadium in Geelong and La Trobe University Sports Park in Bundoora were used as stand-ins for the NFL stadiums. The production had created 825 jobs and injected around $29 million to the local economy. In April 2026, it was announced that the official title for the film was Mr. Irrelevant: The John Tuggle Story. However, the film was revealed to have been retitled to Mr. Irrelevant when the first trailer released in September 2026.

== Release ==
Mr. Irrelevant is scheduled to be released on Christmas Day of 2026.
