= Philadelphia Shakespeare Theatre =

Annual theatre festival in Philadelphia

The Philadelphia Shakespeare Theatre, formerly the Philadelphia Shakespeare Festival, was an annual Shakespearean theatre festival in Philadelphia. The company suspended production in 2016. The company resumed school tours in 2017, but has been inactive since 2021.

Every year, the Festival produced two or three productions of Shakespeare's plays. Founded as the Red Heel Theatre in 1989, and changing name and purpose in 1993, the Philadelphia Shakespeare Festival was the region's only theatre devoted entirely to Shakespeare's works. In 2008/9, the company was renamed The Philadelphia Shakespeare Theatre. The Theatre had several programs for adults and students including a lecture series, school matinees, a Shakespeare School Tour, placed teaching artists in classrooms, and a Classical Acting Academy providing early career actors with intense classical training culminating in a free summer Shakespeare play for the public.

In 2008, Philadelphia City Council passed a resolution honoring the Festival.

== Shakespeare Café ==
The Shakespeare Café was a program introduced in the 2007 season. This was the Festival's less formal Shakespeare offering.

== Past festivals ==
1996 Deirdre of the Sorrows, Much Ado About Nothing

1997 Macbeth

1998 The Merchant of Venice, The Tempest

1999 Much Ado About Nothing, Hamlet

2000 The Winter’s Tale, The Taming of the Shrew, Romeo and Juliet

2001 Measure for Measure, Twelfth Night, Cymbeline

2002 Othello, A Midsummer Night’s Dream, King Lear

2003 Julius Caesar, Macbeth

2004 The Complete Works of William Shakespeare (Abridged)

2005 As You Like It, Hamlet, Twelfth Night

2006 Much Ado About Nothing, The Tempest, The Complete Works of William Shakespeare (Abridged), The Two Gentlemen of Verona

2007 The Taming of the Shrew, Othello,

2008 Romeo and Juliet, Pericles, Prince of Tyre

2009 Henry IV, Part I, The Complete Works of William Shakespeare (Abridged)

2010 Henry V, Macbeth, A Midsummer Night’s Dream

2011 The Comedy of Errors, Hamlet, As You Like It

2012 Cymbeline, Twelfth Night, Titus Andronicus

2013 Much Ado About Nothing, Othello, The Two Noble Kinsmen

2014 Henry V, iHamlet, Love’s Labour’s Lost, Romeo and Juliet

2015 The Taming of the Shrew, Kill Will, A Midsummer Night’s Dream

2016 Macbeth, Twelfth Night

2017 Hamlet

2018 Macbeth
