= Sophie Barthes =

American director

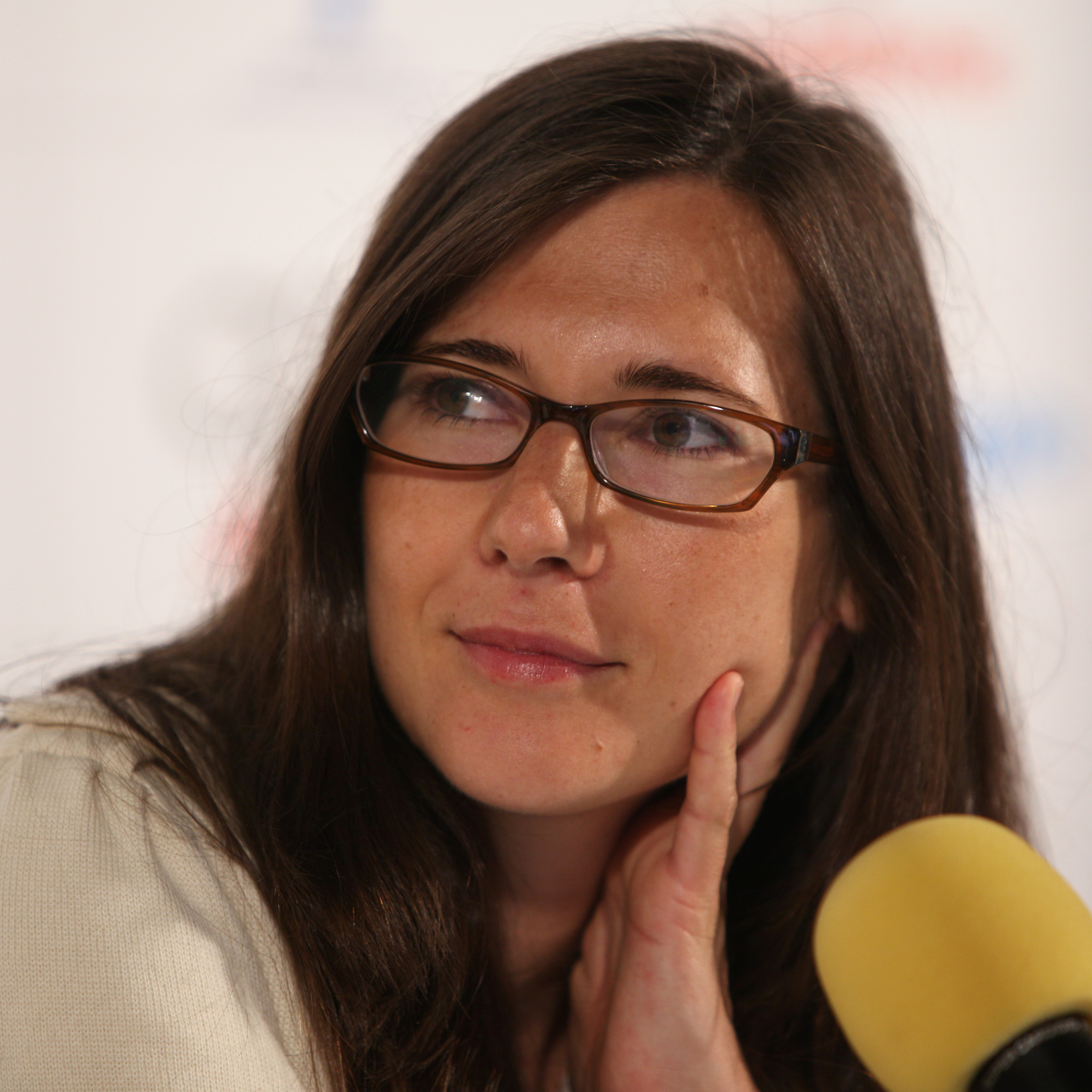
- Sophie Barthes in Karlovy Vary
- Born: 1974 (age 51–52); France
- Occupations: Film director, screenwriter
- Years active: 2007–present
- Notable work: Cold Souls (2009), Madame Bovary (2014)
- Spouse: Andrij Parekh

Sophie Barthes (born 1974) is a French-American film director and screenwriter best known for her 2009 film Cold Souls.

== Early life ==
Barthes was born in France and was raised in South America and the Middle East. She moved to New York in 2001 to attend the Columbia University School of the Arts and also studied international relations, earning her degree in 2003.

== Career ==
Barthes' short film Happiness, which tells the story of a woman who purchases a box of happiness and cannot decide if she should open it, was shown at the 2007 Sundance Film Festival. The film was well-received and earned her a place in the Sundance Institute's Screenwriters Lab, where she began to write the screenplay for her first feature film, Cold Souls. Barthes had first begun to develop the idea for Cold Souls in 2005, after she had a dream about Woody Allen having his soul extracted. The film, directed by Barthes, premiered at the 2008 Sundance Film Festival, where it was nominated for the Grand Jury Prize. It was released in August 2009, and starred Paul Giamatti as a fictionalized version of himself who decides to have his soul removed.

Barthes received artists' grants from the New York State Council on the Arts for both Happiness and Cold Souls, and both films received awards and nominations from numerous film festivals. She was a resident at the Nantucket Screenwriters Colony, the 2007 Sundance Screenwriters Lab, and the 2007 Sundance Directors Lab. At the 25th Independent Spirit Awards, held in 2010, Barthes was nominated for the Best First Screenplay for Cold Souls.

Barthes' second feature is Madame Bovary, an adaptation of Gustave Flaubert's novel of the same name to be released in 2014.

== Personal life ==
Barthes lives in the East Village of Manhattan with her partner, cinematographer Andrij Parekh, who filmed Cold Souls and Madame Bovary with Barthes.

== Filmography ==
=== Feature films ===
- Cold Souls (2009)
- Madame Bovary (2014)
- The Pod Generation (2023)

=== Short films ===
- Happiness (2006)
