= Better Living Through Chemistry (2014 film) =

- Theatrical release poster
- Directed by: David Posamentier; Geoff Moore
- Written by: David Posamentier; Geoff Moore
- Produced by: Felipe Marino; Joe Neurauter
- Starring: Sam Rockwell; Olivia Wilde; Michelle Monaghan; Ben Schwartz; Ken Howard; Ray Liotta; Jane Fonda
- Cinematography: Tim Suhrstedt
- Edited by: Jonathan Alberts
- Music by: Andrew Feltenstein; John Nau
- Production companies: Bishop Varney Productions Inc; Occupant Entertainment; Ealing Metro International
- Distributed by: Samuel Goldwyn Films (United States); Universal Pictures (United Kingdom)
- Release date: March 14, 2014 (United States)
- Running time: 91 minutes
- Countries: United States; United Kingdom
- Language: English
- Box office: $120,823

Better Living Through Chemistry is a 2014 American comedy-drama film directed and written by David Posamentier and Geoff Moore. The film stars Sam Rockwell, Olivia Wilde, Michelle Monaghan, Ben Schwartz, Ken Howard, Ray Liotta, and Jane Fonda. The film was released on March 14, 2014.

== Plot ==
Doug Varney, is unhappily married to Kara. She gives their son Ethan free rein, so he blacks out his windows and eats crushed cookies with milk, instead of cereal.

Kara is obsessed with staying fit and cycling, and disinterested in intimacy. She exercises constantly, teaches spin classes and wins the town's bicycle race, Tour de Woodbury, every year.

Straitlaced Doug is bullied by his retired father-in-law, whose small-town pharmacy he took over, but would not let him rename it from Bishop's to Varney's. Although frustrated, he takes pride in his work and is very discreet.

When Doug's delivery person Noah does not finish his deliveries, Doug does them. Arriving at Elizabeth Roberts', he delivers several different bottles. She is a bored trophy wife, prescription drug abuser and one of Doug's best clients. Elizabeth admits she does not have the cash on her, Doug says she can pay him once she does. Calling him both sweet and honest, she kisses him.

Doug goes home to an unhappy Kara. Ethan's principal has called them in for an urgent conference.

On the weekend, spinning instructor Kara and Doug go road bicycle training in a group. Doug lags behind, arriving 45 minutes later, finishing last, so he is left to pay the restaurant bill and abandoned. Elizabeth becons him to have lunch at her table. She easily seduces the unhappy Doug and they begin an affair.

The Varneys are told that Ethan vandalized a locker with his excrement. As there were previous instances, without the perpetrator being found, the school concludes he's responsible for them. The school psychologist suggests Ethan see him twice a week, so a disgruntled Kara leaves.

Over dinner with Kara's dad and his trophy wife, he suggests the Varneys send Ethan to them a few nights a week. He suggests that Doug is not a strong enough male role model.

The next evening, Elizabeth arrives to the pharmacy at closing. She tells Doug she married for money and she dropped out of college. Frustrated at not having traveled yet although her husband Jack has the means, Elizabeth abuses prescription drugs to combat boredom.

Initially, Doug and Elizabeth are simply having an affair and she teaches him about how to dress, do yoga and better sexually satisfy her. But she then convinces him to 'transform' by "better living through chemistry". One day, as Elizabeth says she wishes they could run away together, Doug jokingly says he could alter Jack's heart medication to get around the prenup, by causing Jack's death.

The next day, DEA Agent Carp comes into the pharmacy to do a business transfer stock check. Doug tries to stall him. Elizabeth helps calm him.

That night, Doug sits to chat with Ethan, who brings out a box with ninja weapons: nunchucks, etc, they then commit vandalism, including at the pharmacy.

Determined beat Kara in this year's bicycling race, Doug pushes to the front, lags to the back, then pops a pill, that he compounded, and wins. Back home, they have sex and she satisfied. Doug and Elizabeth decide to overdose Jack by increasing his heart medication dosage.

Hungover, at the pharmacy the next day, Doug faces Agent Carp again. Doug manages to put Carp off a few more days. That evening Doug meets Jack, who pays for Doug's drinks. At home Doug writes a farewell letter to Kara and falls asleep.

Waking in a panic, dreaming he accidentally drowned in the tub, Doug races to save Jack, only to see him unresponsive in his living room. In a panic, he hurries back to Career Day at Ethan's school. A cop is there for his child, called to take Doug to the pharmacy. Believing he is going to jail, they instead find Noah, the delivery person, dead on the floor. Agent Carp assumes that the delivery boy must have been stealing the medications.

Doug realizes his son Ethan needs him. He leaves Kara. Elizabeth calls and he tells her Jack is alive and he is staying in Woodbury. She heads overseas.

== Cast ==
- Sam Rockwell as Doug Varney
- Olivia Wilde as Elizabeth Roberts
- Michelle Monaghan as Kara Varney
- Ray Liotta as Jack Roberts
- Norbert Leo Butz as Agent Andrew Carp
- Ben Schwartz as Noah
- Ken Howard as Walter Bishop
- Jane Fonda as the film's narrator, and herself, a customer at Doug's pharmacy

== Production ==
On February 25, 2010, The Hollywood Reporter reported that Posamentier and Moore would collaborate on their directorial debut, with their own screenplay of Better Living Through Chemistry, for Occupant Films. On January 7, 2014, Samuel Goldwyn Films has acquired all the United States distribution rights to the film for a spring 2014 release.

=== Casting ===
In April 2010, Paul Rudd was expected to join the cast as a lead actor to play Douglas Varney. On September 15, 2010, Jennifer Garner and Jeremy Renner joined the cast to play the lead roles in the film, with Renner to play Douglas Varney and Garner to play Elizabeth Roberts. On February 11, 2011, Judi Dench and Michelle Monaghan joined the cast of the film.

Then, on July 15, 2011, Sam Rockwell continued negotiations with Occupant Films to replace Renner, who left the project due to a hectic filming schedule. In August 2011, Garner was pregnant and expecting her third child with Ben Affleck, resulting in the actress' departure from the project. Olivia Wilde replaced Garner and was cast opposite the confirmed Rockwell. Ray Liotta also joined the cast on March 27, 2012 to play the husband of Elizabeth Roberts. On May 16, 2012, Jane Fonda joined the cast of the film as Narrator, as well as a cameo as a customer of a pharmacy run by Douglas Varney.

=== Filming ===
The filming of Better Living Through Chemistry began in May 2012 in Annapolis, Maryland. The duration of filming was five weeks and it occurred in different locations, including Baltimore, Anne Arundel County and Eastern Shore of Maryland. On May 10, 2012, the filming crew was shooting footage at Maryland State House. The pharmacy was set in "the historic but vacant Johnson's Building, at the corner of State Circle and Maryland Avenue", opposite the Maryland State House.

== Reception ==
On Rotten Tomatoes the film has an approval rating of 24% based on reviews from 34 critics.
