= John Tuggle =

American football player (1961–1986)

- Tuggle in 1983

No. 38
- Position: Running back

Personal information
- Born: January 13, 1961; Honolulu, Hawaii, U.S.
- Died: August 30, 1986 (aged 25); Tijuana, Mexico
- Listed height: 6 ft 1 in (1.85 m)
- Listed weight: 210 lb (95 kg)

Career information
- High school: Independence (San Jose, California)
- College: California
- NFL draft: 1983: 12th round, 335th overall pick

Career history
- New York Giants (1983)

Career NFL statistics
- Rushing attempts: 17
- Rushing yards: 49
- Receptions: 3
- Receiving yards: 50
- Return yards: 156
- Total touchdowns: 1
- Stats at Pro Football Reference

John Davis Tuggle (January 13, 1961 – August 30, 1986) was an American professional football player who was a running back in the National Football League (NFL) for one season with the New York Giants. He played college football for the California Golden Bears and was selected by the Giants as the final pick of the 1983 NFL draft. Tuggle's professional career was cut short after his rookie season by a cancer diagnosis and he died two years later.

== Life and career ==
Tuggle played high school football for Independence High School in San Jose, California. The school now holds the annual John Tuggle Memorial Golf Tournament as a sports program fundraiser. He went on to play four seasons for the California Golden Bears as their starting fullback, rushing for 1,813 yards and 16 touchdowns, while also catching 108 passes for 914 yards and three scores. Tuggle earned a spot in the starting lineup in the fourth game of his true freshman season in 1979, helping the team reach the 1979 Garden State Bowl, the school's first bowl game appearance since 1959. Cal lost the game 28–17 and finished with a 6–6 record. Cal won a combined total of just four games during Tuggle's next two seasons, but their 1980 game against Stanford University turned out to be one of the highlights of his career. With a 2–8 record, Cal entered the game as 15-point underdogs against the 6–4 Cardinal led by future NFL Hall of Famer John Elway. Tuggle rushed 27 times for 110 yards and two touchdowns in the game, while also catching two passes for 37 yards as his team upset Stanford 28–23 and ruined the Cardinal's chance of playing in a bowl game. In Tuggle's senior season of 1982, he led the team in rushing and helped them achieve a 7–4 record. In their final game against Stanford, Tuggle had 28 carries for 97 yards, a performance that was largely overshadowed by the game's dramatic ending, known as The Play.

Tuggle was a member of the Omega Chapter of the Beta Theta Pi Fraternity at the University of California, Berkeley.

Selected by the Giants with the last pick of the 1983 draft, granting him the unenviable title of Mr. Irrelevant for that season, Tuggle fought hard to make the roster and secured himself a spot on special teams after some solid plays in the pre-season. Tuggle played most of the 1983 season on special teams, but was promoted to starting fullback in week 12 when Rob Carpenter was injured. He finished the season with 17 carries for 49 yards and a touchdown, three receptions for 50 yards, and nine kickoff returns for 156 yards. He was voted special teams player of the year by his teammates.

The offseason in 1984 turned out to be less positive. Tuggle and his wife divorced and suffered a knee injury during a workout, resulting in minor surgery. During the summer, Tuggle and some teammates were involved in a minor car crash when their vehicle struck a telephone pole. Tuggle noticed pain in his shoulder that seemed too significant for the relatively minor collision.

Advised to see a doctor by Carpenter, who was also in the car, Tuggle was soon diagnosed with cancer, specifically angiosarcoma which affects the blood vessels and lymph system.

He stayed on the team and continued to work out with them, hoping he could one day return to the field. "You could tell what a terrible thing his chemotherapy was," said Giants conditioning coach Johnny Parker, "but John actually got stronger, and although it broke your heart to do it, he wanted to be pushed, he didn't want sympathy. In the weight room, John Tuggle was not sick. John Tuggle was a standard." The Giants advised Tuggle not to report to training camp in 1985, as that way they would not have to cut him from the team and he could collect a salary until his contract expired in February 1986.

In the final months of his life, Tuggle moved in with a college friend, as he wanted to die in California. He spent his remaining days undergoing cancer treatment in San Diego and Mexico until his death on August 30, 1986.

Though they did not keep him on the team after the 1985 season, the Giants paid for Tuggle's health insurance for the remainder of his life. Team members wore his number 38 on their helmets as a tribute during their 1986–87 Super Bowl winning season.

== In popular culture ==
Tuggle is the subject of the 30 for 30 short, The Irrelevant Giant. Tuggle will be the subject of the biopic Mr. Irrelevant, portrayed by David Corenswet. The film will be released in theaters on December 25, 2026.
