= All the Boys Love Mandy Lane =

2006 film by Jonathan Levine

- Theatrical release poster
- Directed by: Jonathan Levine
- Written by: Jacob Forman
- Produced by: Chad Feehan; Joe Neurauter; Felipe Marino
- Starring: Amber Heard; Michael Welch; Whitney Able; Edwin Hodge; Aaron Himelstein; Luke Grimes; Melissa Price; Adam Powell; Peyton Hayslip; Brooke Bloom; Robert Earl Keen; Anson Mount
- Cinematography: Darren Genet
- Edited by: Josh Noyes
- Music by: Mark Schulz
- Production company: Occupant Films
- Distributed by: Radius-TWC
- Release dates: September 10, 2006 (TIFF); October 11, 2013 (United States)
- Running time: 90 minutes
- Country: United States
- Language: English
- Budget: $750,000
- Box office: $1.9 million

All the Boys Love Mandy Lane is a 2006 American slasher film directed by Jonathan Levine in his feature directorial debut, written by Jacob Forman, and starring Amber Heard, Michael Welch, Whitney Able, and Anson Mount. The plot centers on a group of popular high schoolers who invite an attractive outsider, Mandy Lane, to spend the weekend at a secluded ranch house, where they are followed by a merciless killer.

Originally completed in 2006, the film premiered at a number of film festivals throughout 2006 and 2007, including 31st Toronto, 39th Sitges, 38th SXSW, and 7th London FrightFest. It received a theatrical release in the United Kingdom on February 15, 2008. All the Boys Love Mandy Lane received mixed reviews from critics, with some dismissing the film as "bogus and compromised", and others praising its exploitation film aesthetic and likening its cinematography to the early work of Terrence Malick and Tobe Hooper.

Despite its international attention, the film remained unreleased in the United States for over seven years after it was completed; this was due to complications with its distributor, Senator Entertainment, which went bankrupt shortly after purchasing the film from The Weinstein Company. On March 8, 2013, it was announced that The Weinstein Company had re-acquired the rights to theatrically release the film in the United States. The film became available through video on demand in September 2013, and was given a limited theatrical release on October 11, 2013, through a joint contract between Senator Entertainment and Weinstein's subsidiary label Radius-TWC.

== Plot ==
At a Texas high school, Mandy Lane blossoms over the summer, attracting her male classmates. One of them, Dylan, invites Mandy to a pool party at his house. She accepts with the provision that her best friend Emmet can come along. At the party, Dylan bullies and humiliates Emmet, until Mandy intervenes. As revenge, Emmet convinces a drunken Dylan to jump from the roof into the pool, but Dylan fails to reach the pool, smashing his head on the concrete, which kills him.

Nine months later, Mandy has since befriended many of Dylan's popular friends, while Emmet has been subjected to even more intense bullying. Their stoner classmate Red plans a weekend party at his father's remote ranch, and Mandy reluctantly accepts an invitation from Chloe, a popular but insecure cheerleader. Mandy accompanies Red and Chloe, along with several other classmates—including reserved football player Bird, and romantic couple Jake and Marlin—to Red's ranch. Upon arriving, they are introduced to Garth, the ranch hand.

That night, Jake gets offended over a joke and storms off to a nearby barn, where Marlin performs oral sex on him. They have another argument and, after Jake walks back to the house, an unseen assailant knocks Marlin out and breaks her jaw with the barrel of a shotgun. Back at the house, Jake unsuccessfully attempts to woo Mandy. Anxious about Marlin, Jake then takes Red's shotgun and pickup truck to go search for her. He eventually finds her sitting by a remote lake. Upon closer look, he sees her mangled face, and is confronted by Emmet, seeking vengeance for the humiliation he has suffered. Emmet shoots Jake in the head and breaks Marlin's neck, killing both.

Emmet drives back to the ranch in Red's truck and sees the rest of the group on the porch before shooting fireworks at them. Bird gives chase, believing the driver to be Jake, playing a prank. Emmet confronts Bird and attacks him, eventually slashing his eyes with a knife and stabbing him to death. The rest of the group, drunk and high, fall asleep at the house along with Garth.

The next morning, as the group leaves out the front door, Emmet shoots and wounds Garth. While Mandy tends to Garth, Red and Chloe try to run to Chloe's car. Emmet shoots Red and chases after Chloe, pursuing her in her own car. In Garth's shack, Mandy retrieves the keys to his truck and finds the bloodied knife that Emmet used to kill Bird. She goes outside to find Chloe being chased in her direction. Mandy embraces Chloe, but then stabs her in the stomach, revealing that she is in league with Emmet.

As Chloe bleeds to death, Mandy and Emmet discuss the suicide pact they had planned. Mandy reveals she had no intention of going through with it, convinced that Emmet agreed to the murders only on the basis of winning her affection. Refusing to let her back down, Emmet prepares to shoot her, but Garth intervenes by wounding Emmet with his shotgun, prompting Emmet to stab him multiple times. Emmet chases Mandy into the fields, where they fall into a ditch filled with cattle carcasses. Mandy grabs a log and defends herself against Emmet's machete, eventually killing him. She returns to an injured Garth and they drive away from the ranch. Assuming she was also merely a victim of Emmet, Garth thanks Mandy for saving his life.

A flashback shows the group back at a railroad track, where they took a break from their drive. While the rest goof off, Mandy balances on the tracks and watches her future victims.

== Cast ==
- Amber Heard as Mandy Lane
- Anson Mount as Garth
- Michael Welch as Emmet
- Whitney Able as Chloe
- Edwin Hodge as Bird
- Aaron Himelstein as Red
- Luke Grimes as Jake
- Melissa Price as Marlin
- Adam Powell as Dylan
- Peyton Hayslip as Aunt Jo
- Brooke Bloom as Jen
- Robert Earl Keen as the keg trucker

== Analysis and themes ==
=== School violence ===
Several film critics have drawn comparisons between the events in the film and those perpetrated by Eric Harris and Dylan Klebold, the teenagers responsible for the Columbine massacre—in particular, the character of Emmet, the film's antagonist, who in one scene is shown wearing a shirt similar to that worn by Harris on the day of the massacre.

Writing for the film website Certified Forgotten, Liam Griffin also observes similarities between Emmet's clothing to that of the Columbine shooters, though he notes that "every teenage character [in the film]—from the backstabbing girls to the chauvinistic boys and sadistic Emmet—is terrible by design."

=== "Final girl" inversion ===
Film scholars Cristelle Maury and David Roche, in their introduction to Women Who Kill: Gender and Sexuality in Film and Series of the Post-Feminist Era (2020), note that the film inverts the trope of the "final girl" by revealing her to be a "diabolical mastermind." Writing of the revelation, they note: "As Mandy beckons her, Chloe runs right into her friend's arms, impaling herself on a knife in a back shot that prevents us from anticipating such an outcome... The twist is merely a millennial update of the ending in Friday the 13th (1980), with two significant differences: Mandy's sadism warrants no justification, and as the film's Final Girl, she is the audience's stand-in."

Film scholar Steve Jones makes a similar assessment in the 2024 book The Metamodern Slasher Film, citing it in the tradition of slasher films with a similar plot device such as Night School (1981), Sleepaway Camp (1983), Edge of the Axe (1988), and Ripper (2001). Jones observes that the character of Mandy Lane fits within the mold of the "final girl" as described by film theorist Carol J. Clover in her book Men, Women, and Chain Saws (1992), and that viewers are "given no reason to suspect Mandy" as an antagonist, rendering the film's twist ending particularly shocking.

Griffin summarizes the film's inversion of the final girl trope:

All the Boys Love Mandy Lane pits the audience against their own expectations. As Mandy Lane, Amber Heard seems to be the pitch-perfect final girl. But what do we really know about her? What does she like? What is she passionate about? These questions are never answered because none of the characters in the film care enough to ask. By flipping expectations on their head, Levine and company craft a thought-provoking and brutal slasher that leaves the audience reconsidering their relationship with the genre and its stable of tropes.

== Production ==
=== Development ===
The film had initially been conceived in 2003 when writer Jacob Forman, producer Chad Feehan, and production designer Tom Hammock were all students at the American Film Institute. "I actually started it as my thesis at AFI," Feehan told Twitch Film. "The writer, Jacob Forman and the production designer Tom Hammock and I did it as our thesis together at AFI. We started working on it in 2003, then graduated and got it financed and were able to hire our friends that we graduated with to make the movie. It was obviously quite a journey from 2003 to 2006 when we sold it to the Weinstein Company, and after that it's been pretty trying."

Levine later told the Austin Chronicle that he and screenwriter Jacob Forman had drawn inspiration from Tobe Hooper's The Texas Chain Saw Massacre (1974) as well as the NBC television series Friday Night Lights and John Hughes films. According to Levine, he and cinematography Darren Genet had also drawn inspiration from The Virgin Suicides (1999) and Dazed and Confused (1993) when developing the film's depiction of teenagers.

Lead performer Amber Heard said that when she received the script for the film in Los Angeles, she felt it was noticeably "different". In an interview, she said, "There are so many [scripts] you get where it feels like you're reading the same girl over and over again. And then I read this script and I thought it was truly different and that it could be done well. This was a movie that was really under the radar; no one was really talking about it. It didn't have much money and subsequently it didn't get much attention right off the bat."

=== Casting ===
In conceiving her character, Heard stated that Mandy Lane "[represents] many, many real girls. Many real teenagers, especially in America. There are a lot of incidents of this kind of violence in school with the perpetrators being cute teenagers against their classmates. Their victims are their classmates and they're often their bullies.... [Mandy]'s a great representation of all those girls who are insecure and uncomfortable with their sexuality and their power and yet they're strangely intrigued by it and tempted by it."

=== Filming ===
The film's grainy cinematography and low-angled framing drew comparisons to the films of Tobe Hooper and Terrence Malick

Principal photography began on location in Austin, Texas, and nearby Bastrop in 2006, on a budget of $750,000.

According to Amber Heard, she spent little time with the rest of the cast when filming wasn't taking place in order to maintain a distance necessary to her character. She also said that the shoot was very low-maintenance, saying, "Everyone has these expectations, whether they're subconscious or not, of the glamour and how much fun that you can have in L.A. and I went with those same expectations. This was my first shoot, my first leading role. I fly to my hometown, funnily enough, to film and I stand out in this field waiting for my hair and make-up. Instead of the chair, instead of the lights, I stand in the middle of a field and have, literally, a bucket of freshly-dug mud dumped on my head."

Anson Mount recalled the film shoot as being "very well organized by the producers. All we had to do was show up to work and have a good time. It was a very aggressive production by what was then a very young company, Occupant."

== Release ==
All the Boys Love Mandy Lane premiered on September 10, 2006, at the 2006 Toronto International Film Festival, followed by screenings at the Sitges Film Festival, South by Southwest, London FrightFest Film Festival, the IFI Horrorthon, at the Cinémathèque Française.

=== Distribution ===
Upon the film's premiere at the Toronto International Film Festival in 2006, film executive Harvey Weinstein, "in characteristically aggressive deal-making mode," sought to purchase distribution rights after its screening ended around 1:30 am. By 5:00 am on September 11, 2006, an agreement was reached, and a contract was signed later that morning, with The Weinstein Company officially purchasing global distribution rights for a reported $3.5 million. In the contract, Weinstein committed to giving the film a wide release in the United States under the Weinsteins' Dimension Films branch. Harvey Weinstein's brother Bob Weinstein, who managed Dimension Films, reportedly did not feel the film warranted a wide release: "I didn't feel that it was the right way to approach an artful film like this," he said. A test screening was undertaken in New Jersey, after which less than 30% of the audience reported a positive response, leaving the Weinsteins reluctant to give the film a wide release.

Despite the poor test screening, Dimension Films slated the film for a U.S. release of July 20, 2007. However, due to the subsequent financial failure of the studio's Grindhouse, among other horror films, the Weinstein Company instead sold the film to Senator Entertainment US. Senator, a German company who had acquired distribution rights for the film in Germany and Austria, had recently established a U.S. branch. An American release through Senator never materialized, however, after the company's U.S. branch went out of business in April 2009, leaving the film held in limbo with other unreleased projects.

In 2008, the film was screened at the Gérardmer Film Festival, Lyon L'Étrange Festival, and the Fantasia Film Festival, and received a theatrical release in the United Kingdom on February 15, 2008, through Optimum Releasing. Between 2008 and 2010, it continued to open in various foreign markets, receiving theatrical releases in Germany and Austria (through Senator), as well as in Sweden, Mexico, Peru, and the Netherlands, among others.

At the San Diego Comic-Con 2010, director Levine and star Heard appeared for a screening of the film, and hinted that a North American release was finally forthcoming, though they did not say when or who would be handling the release. In the spring of 2013, it was reported that The Weinstein Company had re-acquired distribution rights to the film. Several months later, the film was released on demand in North American markets through The Weinstein Company subsidiary, Radius-TWC, on September 6, 2013, and given a limited theatrical release on October 11, 2013, in the United States—over seven years after its premiere at the Toronto International Film Festival.

=== Home media ===
All the Boys Love Mandy Lane was released on Blu-ray and DVD in the United Kingdom in a Region 2 format on July 21, 2008, by Optimum Home Entertainment. It was released in North America on Blu-ray and DVD in Region 1 format on December 3, 2013, through Anchor Bay Entertainment.

In November 2026, Lionsgate and Vestron Pictures announced a forthcoming Blu-ray release commemorating the film's twentieth anniversary, scheduled to be released on December 15, 2026.

== Reception ==
=== Box office ===
Upon its release in the United Kingdom in February 2008, the film grossed a total of US$400,851. It garnered an additional $482,500 in Germany upon its June 2008 release there. It was released in various other countries over the course of 2008 and 2009, and by April 2010 had grossed an international total of $1,893,697, more than covering its $750,000 budget.

=== Critical response ===
The film received mixed reviews upon its initial festival screenings and subsequent European theatrical release in 2008. On the review aggregator website Rotten Tomatoes, it holds an approval rating of 47% based on 64 reviews, with an average rating of 5.1/10. The website's critics consensus states, "Mandy Lane has enough wit and craft to spark the horror fans' interest, but is not sufficiently original for mainstream audiences." On the website Metacritic, the film received a score of 44 out of 100, based on 21 critics, indicating "mixed or average" reviews.

It received a favorable review from The Globe and Mail, who wrote that it "displays an intelligence lacking in most teen slasher pics," and Film Threat called the film "a well-shot, [...] semi-cerebral horror film." eFilmCritic wrote that the film's writing of its titular character is flawed, but it "evokes the rich landscapes of early Terrence Malick and the grimy grindhouse tales of the '70s, converging poetically into its heartmashing climax. This is a film where the blood and carnage doesn’t feel like corn syrup or CGI and each death grows in sadness, not quality." Bloody Disgusting called it "a solid entry into the slasher genre and a pretty damn good teen thriller to boot." Other critics gave the film less flattering reviews, with The Guardian calling it "bogus and compromised: an unreconstructed horror romp in the guise of a nerdish intellectual." Slant Magazine said the film "flaunts its knowledge of classic genre fundamentals but fails to do anything very clever or surprising with them," and later compared its cinematography and aesthetic mood to The Virgin Suicides (1999). Tim Robey of The Daily Telegraph called the film "arrestingly well shot for a low-budget horror," but noted that it had an "anorexic plot."

The film continued to receive mixed reviews upon its theatrical release in the United States in October 2013. Nicholas Rapold of The New York Times praised the film, noting that "cinematographer Darren Genet draws from long shots of pursuits and a vaguely 1970s look, which wasn’t cutting-edge during the film’s making but suits the real-time nostalgia of high school activities, even murderous ones," and Scott Weinberg of Fearnet said the film "[brings] a quietly artistic taste of teen-aged sexual politics to a subgenre that's generally disinterested in anything resembling brains, wit, or subtext." The Los Angeles Times gave the film a positive review as well, calling it "a small, tightly coiled spellbinder," and praised Heard's performance, referring to it as her most "definitive [performance] to date."

The New York Post gave the film a less favorable review, calling it "A slightly artsy attempt to revive the teen slasher movie [that] drifts awkwardly between popcorn entertainment and angsty mood piece." Christy Lemire of the RogerEbert.com wrote that "[With the opening scene], Levine promisingly sets a dark and disturbing tone. But the vast majority of the film, which takes place nine months later, is a rather standard depiction of the bad kids trying to corrupt the last American virgin." Lemire also commented on the film's delayed release history, stating: "Its attempts at examining and subverting the well-worn conventions of the genre in the script from Jacob Forman might have seemed more novel seven years ago. But by now we've seen this approach executed much more effectively—and thrillingly." The Washington Post, however, praised the film's acting and thematics, writing: "Thoughtful viewers may detect thematic whiffs of Columbine, blended with Carrie that darken and complicate the film’s aroma of stale blood. Thoughtful viewers? What kind of teen slasher movie is this? Too dumb for the arthouse, but too smart for the mall multiplex, the movie satisfies, paradoxically, precisely because it doesn’t deliver on expectations."

In his book Nightmare Movies: Horror on Screen Since the 1960s, film scholar Kim Newman likened the film's teenage characters to the troubled youth in works by Richard Linklater or Larry Clark.

=== Accolades ===
In 2008, the film was nominated for a Golden Trailer Award for Best Horror.

== Soundtrack ==
Although an official soundtrack was not released, the film features the following songs:

- "In Anticipation of Your Suicide" by Bedroom Walls
- "84" by Nude
- "Slowly, Just Breathe" by Dead Waves
- "Good Day" by Kunek
- "Our Lips Are Sealed" by The Go-Go's
- "Thin Air" by Brian Jennings
- "Sister Golden Hair" by Gerry Beckley (America), covered by Juliette Commagere
- "Do Ya" by Peaches
- "Piano Concerto No. 5 in E Flat Major, Second Movement" by Ludwig van Beethoven
- "Oh Molly Dear" by B. F. Shelton
- "You Take the Fall" by The Sunday Drivers
- "Free Stress Test" by Professor Murder
- "Dreadful Selfish Crime" by Robert Earl Keen
- "Yup Yes Yeah" by Buffalo Roam
- "Green Zone" by Mark Schulz
- "One of Us Is Dead" by The Earlies
- "The Rundown" by S.W.E.A.T.
- "Sealed with a Kiss" by Bobby Vinton

== See also ==
- School violence
- Delayed release

== Sources ==
- Jones, Steve (2024). The Metamodern Slasher Film. Edinburgh, Scotland: Edinburgh University Press. ISBN 978-1-399-52097-3.
- Newman, Kim (2011). Nightmare Movies: Horror on Screen Since the 1960s. London, England: Bloomsbury. ISBN 978-1-408-81750-6.
- Maury, Cristelle; Roche, David, eds. (2020). "Introduction". Women Who Kill: Gender and Sexuality in Film and Series of the Post-Feminist Era. New York City, New York: Bloomsbury USA. pp. 1–33. ISBN 978-1-350-11559-0.
