= Joe Neurauter =

American film producer (born 1977)

- Born: Innsbruck, Austria
- Occupation: Film producer
- Years active: 2005–present

Joe Neurauter (born 1977) is an Austrian-born independent film producer best known for his work on All the Boys Love Mandy Lane (2006) and The Wackness (2008) with Keith Calder and Felipe Marino.

== Early and personal life ==
Neurauter was born in Innsbruck, though he is now based in Los Angeles. His biggest sources of inspiration as a producer are Martin Scorsese's films Goodfellas (1990) and Casino (1995), because "they were visually stunning, had strong characters and great storytelling".

== Career ==
Neurauter graduated from the University of Southern California's (USC) Peter Stark Producing Program in 2004 and went on to form a production company, Occupant Films, with fellow USC graduates Keith Calder and Felipe Marino in 2005. The three producers joined together because Marino says that they share "similar entrepreneurial spirits". Neurauter, Calder and Marino found their first script, All the Boys Love Mandy Lane by Jacob Forman, through a contact in USC's writing department within a week of founding the company. After its completion, the film was screened at the 2006 Toronto International Film Festival and was bought by The Weinstein Company though it was re-sold and has yet to be released in the United States. Their second project was The Wackness, a collaboration with Jonathan Levine, who had directed All the Boys Love Mandy Lane. On working with Levine a second time, Calder said that "We want to continue working with strong, creative partners and build a long, lasting relationship with them." Neurauter remarked that ""We saw a lot doors open once we sold Mandy Lane, but it's a whole different level to have a movie [The Wackness] released. It gives you a totally different perception in the community." Having completed two feature films, Marino said that "The goal in the upcoming years is to do two to three movies per year." In 2008, he was named one of Variety's "10 Producers to Watch" alongside Calder and Marino.

== Filmography ==
- Better Living Through Chemistry (2013)
- The Uprising (2026)
- Riddick: Furya (TBA)
