= Jonathan Levine =

American film director and screenwriter (born 1976)

- Born: Jonathan A. Levine; New York City, New York, United States
- Education: Brown University (BA); American Film Institute (MFA)
- Occupation: Filmmaker

Jonathan A. Levine (/ləˈviːn/ lə-VEEN;) is an American filmmaker.

== Early life and education ==
Levine was born and raised in New York City to a Jewish family. He attended St. Bernard's School, in Manhattan, and Phillips Academy, in Andover, Massachusetts. He received his bachelor's degree from Brown University, where he majored in Art Semiotics. He earned his Masters of Fine Arts (MFA) in Film Directing from the American Film Institute, in Los Angeles, at its AFI Conservatory.

== Career ==
Levine was the assistant to film director Paul Schrader prior to his own directorial career taking-off. In 2006, he was nominated for a Best Independent Mini-Feature Award at the Black Reel Awards for his AFI Thesis short film Shards (2004), which also won a Certificate of Excellence at the 2005 Brooklyn Film Festival for Best Cinematography by Petra Korner. He wrote and directed a documentary short entitled Love Bytes (2005), where he sets out on a cross country roadtrip to find love in major cities with the assistance of a laptop and an Audi A3.

His feature directorial debut was the 2006 dramatic horror film All the Boys Love Mandy Lane, starring Amber Heard with the screenplay written by Jacob Forman. The film had its premiere at the 2006 Toronto International Film Festival, followed by screenings at the Sitges Film Festival, South by Southwest, London FrightFest Film Festival, and the IFI Horrorthon, at the French Cinemathèque. In 2008, he wrote and directed The Wackness, starring Josh Peck. It won the Audience Award at the 2008 Sundance Film Festival and was nominated for the Grand Jury Prize (Dramatic) as well. The Wackness also won Best Narrative Feature at the 2008 Los Angeles Film Festival, The Most Popular Feature Film Award at the 2008 Melbourne International Film Festival, and was nominated for a Best First Screenplay award at the 2008 Independent Spirit Awards. In addition, the film won Best International Feature Film at the 2008 Zurich Film Festival.

Next, Levine directed the 2011 film 50/50 starring Seth Rogen, Joseph Gordon-Levitt and Anna Kendrick, about a young man being treated for cancer. It was loosely based on the experience of screenwriter Will Reiser, a friend of Rogen's. 50/50 won the Audience Award at the 2011 Aspen Filmfest, the Audience Award at the 2011 Stockholm Film Festival and the Achille Valdata Award at the 2011 Torino International Film Festival /Torino International Festival of Young Cinema. In 2013, Levine directed Warm Bodies, based on the novel by Isaac Marion. It stars Nicholas Hoult as a zombie who slowly begins to return to normal, and forces a girl played by Teresa Palmer to stay with him.

In 2014, Levine directed the pilot episode of the TV series he created with Gina Matthews and Grant Scharbo, Rush, for the USA Network. A medical drama series revolving around a hard-partying doctor named William P. Rush played by Tom Ellis, it was cancelled after one season. The next year he re-teamed with his 50/50 stars Rogen and Gordon-Levitt for Christmas comedy The Night Before, which he directed and co-wrote. It also stars Anthony Mackie, Lizzy Caplan, Mindy Kaling, Jillian Bell and Miley Cyrus in a cameo role.

Levine filmed a pilot for a Showtime comedy series created by executive producer Jim Carrey titled I'm Dying Up Here, based in part on the 2010 non-fiction book of the same name by William Knoedelseder about the stand-up comedy scene in LA during the 1970s. It has been announced that Levine will direct Brooklyn Castle, a feature adaptation of the 2012 documentary of the same name. The storyline tells about a group of New York's inner city, junior high school kids who wanted to compete in a highly prestigious, highly selective national chess tournament.

In April 2025, Levine began production on Mr. Irrelevant, about former NFL football player John Tuggle.

=== Writing ===
Levine has written or co-written the screenplays for many of the feature films and short films that he has directed. He also wrote the screenplay for the short film The Weight (2009), directed by Nicholas Jarecki.

In addition, he wrote an episode of the TV series The Screen Junkies Show, entitled "Zombie Acting Tips" (2013), as well as two episodes of Rush: the pilot (which he also directed) and "Don't Ask Me Why".

Levine is writing the film adaptation of Grady Hendrix's Horrorstör. Searchlight Pictures picked up the rights to the comedic horror novel.

=== Producing ===
Levine produced the 2016 film Mike and Dave Need Wedding Dates, directed by Jake Szymanski and starring Zac Efron, Adam Devine, Anna Kendrick, and Aubrey Plaza. He served as an executive producer on Rush. Most recently, his production company Megamix had signed a deal with Fifth Season.

== Filmography ==
=== Feature film ===
Year	Title	Director	Writer	Producer	Notes
2006	All the Boys Love Mandy Lane	Yes	No	No	
2008	The Wackness	Yes	Yes	No	
2011	50/50	Yes	No	No	
2013	Warm Bodies	Yes	Yes	No	
2015	The Night Before	Yes	Yes	No	
2016	Mike and Dave Need Wedding Dates	No	No	Yes	
2017	Snatched	Yes	No	No	
2019	Long Shot	Yes	No	Yes	
2026	Mr. Irrelevant	Yes	No	Yes	Post-production
2028	Days of Thunder	Yes	No	No	Pre-production
TBA	Sacrament	Yes	No	No	In development

=== Short film ===
Year	Title	Director	Writer	Notes
2004	Shards	Yes	Yes	AFI thesis
2005	Love Bytes	Yes	Yes	
2009	The Weight	No	Yes	

=== Television ===
Year	Title	Director	Executive producer	Creator	Notes
2014	Rush	Yes	Yes	Yes	Directed pilot, co-wrote 2 episodes
2017	I'm Dying Up Here	Yes	No	No	Directed pilot
2021–present	Nine Perfect Strangers	Yes	Yes	No	Directed 10 episodes, co-wrote "Motherlode"
2022–present	Tell Me Lies	Yes	Yes	No	
