= Nepo baby =

Someone who benefits from nepotism

A nepo baby is a person who is perceived to benefit from their parent's celebrity, social capital or wealth to achieve success in a field of work closely related to that of their mother or father, and is most commonly associated with the entertainment industry. The term is a portmanteau of nepotism and baby. Nepo babies are characterized as exploiting their parental connections to build their own careers. The term is often used pejoratively to describe those who found fame or success which critics believe was unearned or undeserved.

== Origin ==
According to Vulture, Douglas Fairbanks Jr. was the first entertainment industry example of what would later be referred to as a nepo baby. In 1923, he was given an acting contract at age 13 by executives at Paramount Pictures, who hoped to leverage the fame of his father Douglas Fairbanks and stepmother Mary Pickford.

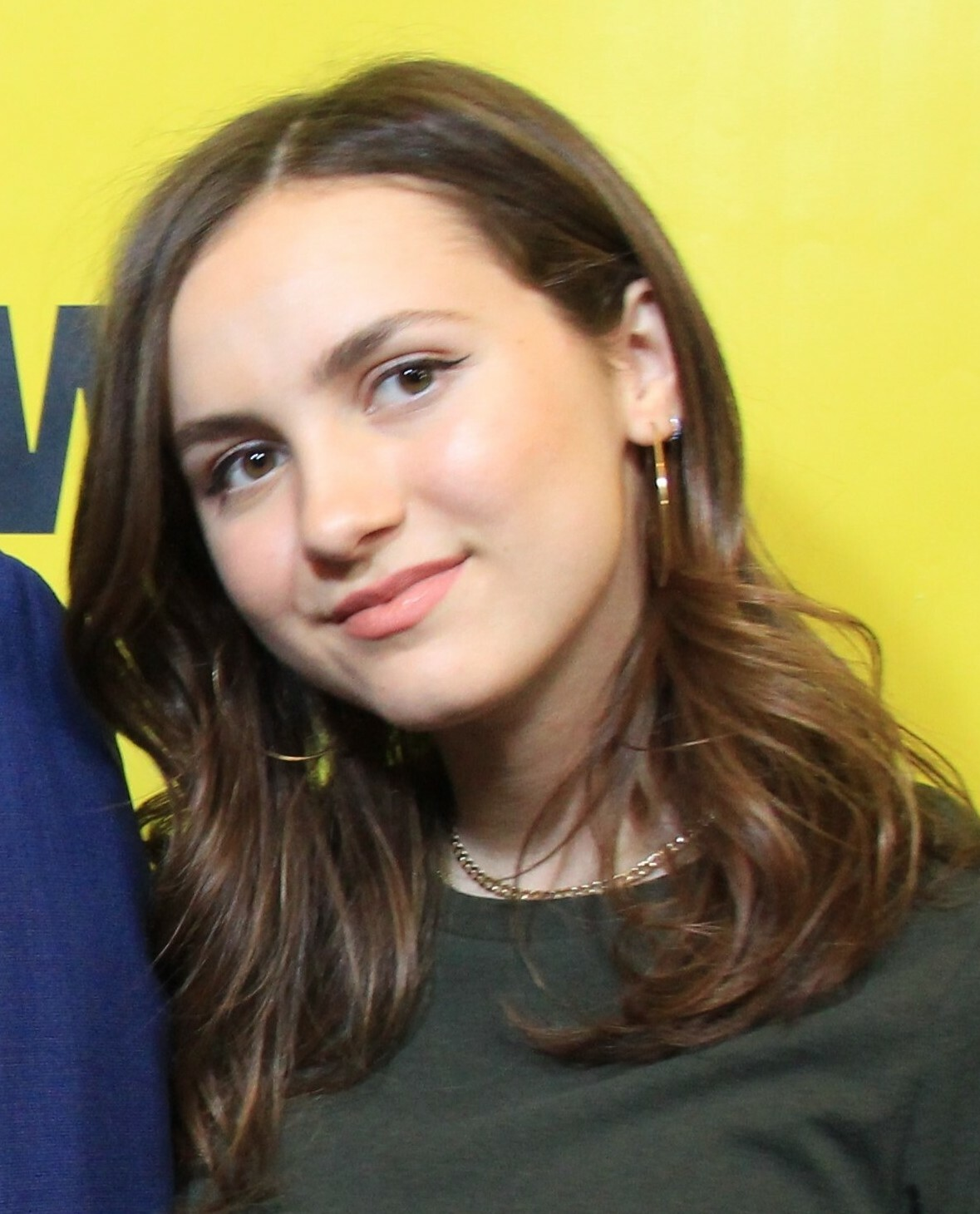
The term "nepo baby" became popular after being used in a Twitter post referring to actress Maude Apatow, daughter of Judd Apatow and Leslie Mann.

The term "nepotism baby" was first popularized in the early 2010s, and was first shortened to "nepo baby" in 2020. According to Nate Jones of Vulture, "One of the earliest instances of nepotism baby being shortened to 'nepo baby' appears in a 2020 post from the blog Pop Culture Died in 2009, which describes Olivia Jade as our era's answer to Bling Ring icon Alexis Haines." Terms such as "full nepo" and "double nepo" have been used if a person is considered a nepo baby through both parents.

The shortened term became popular in 2022 on Twitter when a user tweeted about Maude Apatow, daughter of director Judd Apatow and actress Leslie Mann, starring in the television series Euphoria. This led to the term "nepo baby" trending on TikTok, as users pointed out many examples of what they believed were celebrity nepo babies. The term gained further popularity after New York Magazine published a list of persons they perceived as nepo babies, and called 2022 "the Year of the Nepo Baby". They explored opinions on which celebrities were nepo babies and assessed their opportunities in life. Other publications that have covered the topic include The New York Times, Vox, Forbes, and CNN.

Some celebrities have commented on being seen as nepo babies, such as Zoë Kravitz, Kaia Gerber, Lily-Rose Depp, Lara Cosima Henckel von Donnersmarck, Sean Lennon, Gwyneth Paltrow, Jamie Lee Curtis, Jack Quaid, Angelina Jolie, Ben Platt, Maya Hawke, Gracie Abrams, Lewis Pullman, and Ruby Ashbourne Serkis.

In 2023, Hailey Bieber of the Baldwin family embraced the term, wearing a shirt reading "nepo baby". Hopper Penn has reportedly said that he rejects being labeled as such. Allison Williams, who worked with Lena Dunham on HBO's Girls, stated in regards to Dunham and others being labelled by many as "nepo babies": "It doesn't feel like a loss to admit it. If you trust your own skill, I think it becomes very simple to acknowledge." Rachael Maddux of BuzzFeed, however, disputed whether Dunham could be classified as a "nepo baby".

In the Philippines, amid flood-control controversies, the term has been applied to children of politicians, public officials, and government contractors, who are perceived to flaunt their wealth. The 2025 Nepalese Gen Z protests were partly motivated by the negative reception of "nepo kids" or children of influential politicians in Nepal living lavish lifestyles allegedly funded by public funds.

== Analysis and criticism ==
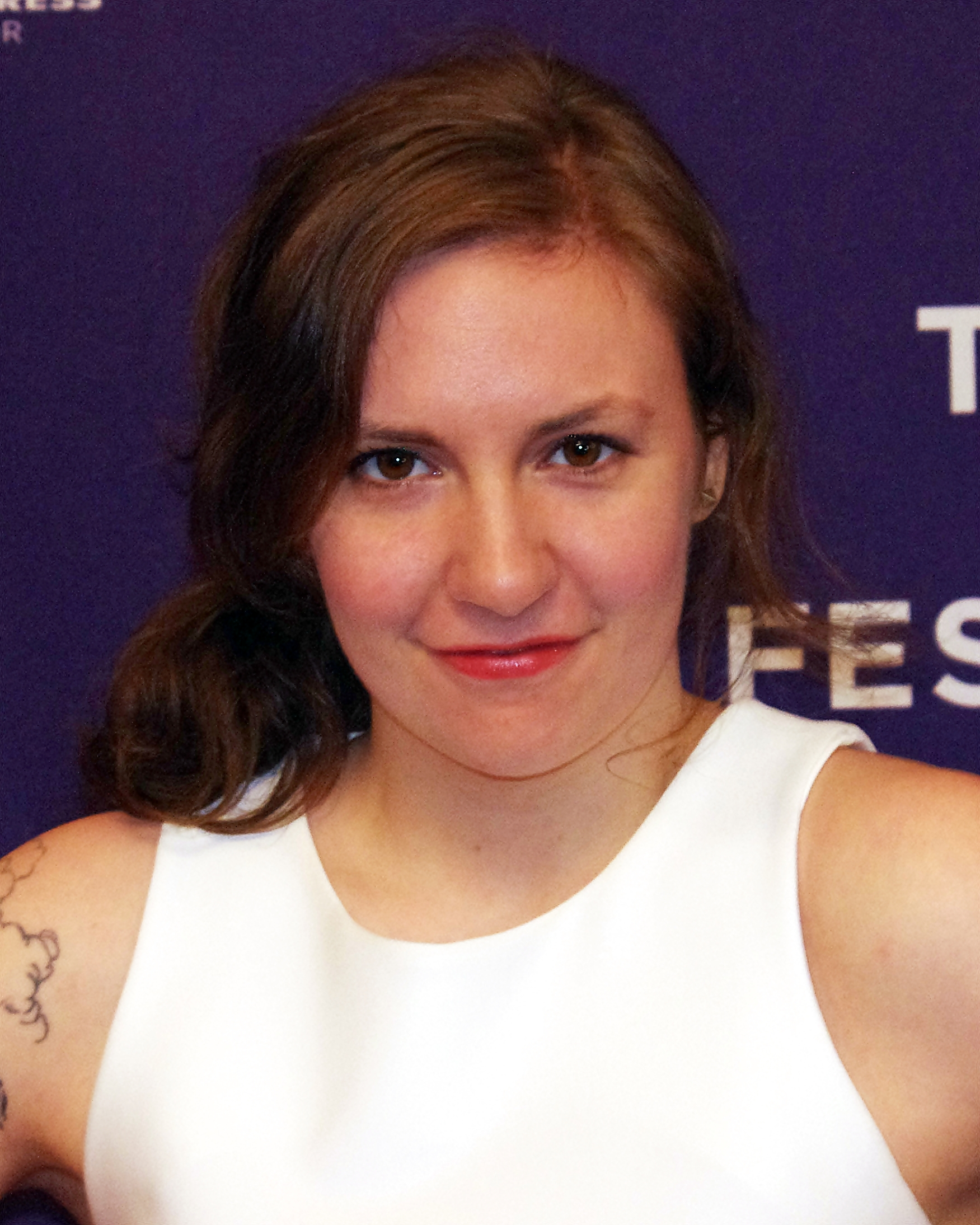
The designation of some celebrities, such as Lena Dunham, as well as the criteria for being deemed a "nepo baby" has been the subject of debate.

In a Vox article on the subject, Columbia University professor Shai Davidai stated Americans tend to strongly believe in meritocracy and also believe exceptional skill and hard work are rewarded, saying "Nepotism babies, they deprive us of that feel-good 'American dream' story."

Users of the term often claim that nepo babies, as well as those who came from wealth in general, are over-represented in media, when compared to those of working-class or other backgrounds typically disconnected from fame. For example, in a December 2022 humor piece about "nepo babies" by The New Yorker, actor Adam Driver, who did not have family connections to the film industry, was noted as a "self-made talent...in a sea of Lily-Rose Depps, be an Adam Driver." In another Vulture article, Kevin Lincoln noted that Driver had been discovered through luck, as well as his own merits. Some have argued the existence of nepo babies argues against any reality for meritocracy.

Although nepotism in sports is arguably limited by the more objective and competitive standards, athletes whose parents were also well-known athletes or otherwise well-connected in sports have been described as "nepo babies". Examples include Bronny James, whose critics have suggested that the influence of his father, LeBron James, has played a significant role in his opportunities.

Some publications, including BuzzFeed and the feminist publication Jezebel, have criticized the terms "nepo baby" and "industry baby" as too loosely applying social privilege, or special advantages conferred on certain groups at the expense of other groups, to certain public figures.

In November 2022, Lily-Rose Depp, the daughter of actors Johnny Depp and Vanessa Paradis, criticized the terms "nepo baby" and "industry baby" as "sexist" and "misogynistic". Arwa Mahdawi of The Guardian dismissed Depp's claim, stating, "I haven't done detailed data analysis of gender-based applications of the term, but I can think of plenty of men who have been called a 'nepo baby', Brooklyn Beckham and Jaden Smith being two very high-profile examples."

In 2023, magicians Penn & Teller said that they believed the term was "another way for the Internet to be resentful". Penn Jillette said he disliked that the term was being applied to his son, Moxie CrimeFighter.

Following her Golden Globe win in January 2025, actress Fernanda Torres, the daughter of Fernando Monteiro Torres and Fernanda Montenegro, criticized the negative perception surrounding nepo babies. Torres said she and many other performers were essentially raised in the industry from childhood and learned from their parents. She also said having famous parents does not resolve all life problems because "you have to invent yourself".

== Related terms ==
The New York magazine issue also used the term "industry baby" (also known as industry plant) to refer to a number of other celebrities. The publication defined an "industry baby" as "a celebrity who had a parent or relation that may not have been extremely wealthy or famous, but had achieved some success in the industry, often behind the scenes, which provided their children with connections and opportunities". Vulture defined the term as a celebrity who "didn't inherit a famous name, but did inherit connections and knowledge of the business". Examples of industry babies cited include Billie Eilish, Meghan Markle, and Kristen Stewart.

An inverse term is "nepo parent" (also gendered as "nepo dad" or "nepo mom") which refers to a parent who is perceived to benefit from their child's celebrity. People who have been referred to as nepo parents include Dina Lohan (mother of Lindsay Lohan), Kris Jenner (matriarch of the Kardashian family) and Michael Whitehall (father of Jack Whitehall). The terms "nepo friend" and "nepo boyfriend/girlfriend" have also been used to describe those who benefit from a friend or romantic partner.

== See also ==
- Nepotism
- Aghazadeh
- Political families
- Ingroup bias
- Hereditary politicians
- Industry plant
- Trust fund baby
