= Pretty Wild =

- Cast
- Genre: Reality
- Directed by: Amber Mazzola
- Starring: Tess Taylor; Alexis Neiers; Gabrielle Neiers; Andrea Arlington
- Country of origin: United States
- Original language: English
- No. of seasons: 1
- No. of episodes: 9

Production
- Executive producers: Amber Mazzola; Barry Katz; Bill Thompson; Brian Volk-Weiss; Chelsea Handler; Dan Levy; Tom Brunelle
- Running time: 40–44 minutes
- Production companies: Borderline Amazing Productions; Five Five Productions; New Wave Entertainment

Original release
- Network: E!
- Release: March 14 – May 23, 2010

Pretty Wild is an American reality television series that premiered on E! on March 14, 2010 and ran for one season. The series chronicles the lives of sisters Alexis Neiers and Gabby Neiers along with their now estranged unofficially adopted sister Tess Taylor as they make their way into the Hollywood social scene. The girls and their family initially resided in Westlake Village, California but eventually moved to Hollywood Hills West, Los Angeles.

In mid-2009, after the pilot was filmed, Alexis was arrested for being involved with a group known as the "Bling Ring" that broke into the homes of many celebrities, including Orlando Bloom, Paris Hilton, Lindsay Lohan, and Rachel Bilson. Pretty Wild partly chronicles Alexis's trial. On May 10, 2010, Alexis pleaded no contest to felony burglary and was sentenced to six months in Los Angeles County Jail. Her sentence was scheduled to begin June 24, 2010.

In the London Review of Books, Andrew O'Hagan wrote about the series' principals:

"If real fame is a mask that eats into the face, then pseudo-fame, the current kind, might be a decoy that eats into the brain. You often meet those people in California, people who have forgotten that you are real, that you watch the news, that you know who they really are. They begin to lie to journalists and themselves with the same grim hope: if I say this and no one contradicts me it might be true. A sense of entitlement stands in for personal values. They don't mind if they're fooling you and fooling themselves, so long as they can keep the show on the road."

A feature film, The Bling Ring, was released in the mid-2013. The movie is based on the burglaries committed by the eponymous group.

== Cast ==
- Tess Taylor is the adopted daughter of Andrea Arlington. She is pursuing a modeling career and is a Playboy Cyber Girl.
- Alexis Neiers is also pursuing a modeling career, she tries to clear her name after an arrest related to "Bling Ring" thefts.
- Gabby Neiers is the younger sister of Alexis.
- Andrea Arlington is the mother of Tess, Alexis and Gabby. She is a former 1980s lingerie model who manages Tess' and Alexis' modeling careers.
- Jerry Dunn is Andrea's husband and stepfather of Alexis, Gabby and Tess.

== Episodes ==
No.	Title	Original release date	Viewers (millions)
1	"The Arrest"	March 14, 2010	1.30
Sisters Tess and Alexis land a modeling gig, but a knock on their door early one morning will change the life of one sister forever.
2	"The Hearing"	March 21, 2010	N/A
With her freedom on the line at a preliminary hearing, Alexis faces charges of allegedly committing a burglary targeting celebrity homes. Meanwhile, Tess is ecstatic when she is invited on a date with a pop superstar and Gabby's world is rocked when Andrea announces that the whole family is making a big move.
3	"The Move"	March 28, 2010	N/A
Alexis books a photo shoot with the NFL's Vernon Davis; Tess' biological mother tries to contact her; Gabby tries to make friends her own age.
4	"The Party"	April 11, 2010	N/A
Gabby plans her 16th birthday party with help from Tess. Later, at the celebration, Alexis is confronted by one of the victims of Hollywood's "bling ring".
5	"What Happens in Cabo, Stays in Cabo"	April 18, 2010	N/A
Alexis goes against her attorney's wishes by traveling to Cabo with the girls for a charity event.
6	"Vanity Unfair"	April 25, 2010	N/A
Alexis gets the opportunity to finally tell her side of the story in an interview in Vanity Fair, but the article does not quite turn out the way she expected. At Andrea's suggestion, Gabby goes job hunting and Tess is determined to find out just where her relationship with rocker Max stands after he did not respond to any of her texts while in Cabo.
7	"Mommy Dearest"	May 2, 2010	N/A
Andrea begins to unravel with her daughter Alexis facing criminal charges that could put her in jail for up to six years.
8	"Birds and Bees"	May 16, 2010	N/A
Alexis struggles over whether to tell a friend about her alleged involvement with the so-called bling-ring investigation.
9	"And So It Is"	May 23, 2010	1.40
Alexis struggles with the stress of her impending trial and finding out that celebrity superstar Orlando Bloom will be testifying against her in court. She begins to unravel as she questions her decision to go to trial or take the plea deal. The rest of the family tries to cope, but the court case begins to affect Tess' relationship with Max.
