= This Is 40 =

2012 film by Judd Apatow

- Theatrical release poster
- Directed by: Judd Apatow
- Written by: Judd Apatow
- Based on: Characters by Judd Apatow
- Produced by: Judd Apatow; Barry Mendel; Clayton Townsend
- Starring: Paul Rudd; Leslie Mann; John Lithgow; Megan Fox; Albert Brooks
- Cinematography: Phedon Papamichael
- Edited by: Brent White; Jay Deuby; David Bertman
- Music by: Jon Brion
- Production company: Apatow Productions
- Distributed by: Universal Pictures
- Release date: December 21, 2012
- Running time: 133 minutes
- Country: United States
- Language: English
- Budget: $35 million
- Box office: $88.1 million

This Is 40 is a 2012 American romantic comedy-drama film written and directed by Judd Apatow and starring Paul Rudd and Leslie Mann. A "sort-of sequel" to Apatow's film Knocked Up (2007), its plot centers on married couple Pete and Debbie, whose stressful relationship is compounded by each turning 40.

This Is 40 was released in the United States on December 21, 2012. It received mixed reviews from critics, who praised its cast, acting, and the film's comedic moments and perceptive scenes, but criticized its overlong running time and occasional aimlessness. In March 2022, it was announced that Apatow was in early development of a third film, set 10 years later and titled This Is 50.

== Plot ==
Five years after Knocked Up, Debbie owns a boutique, and among her employees are a frumpy cynic and poor saleswoman named Jodi and an attractive and talented saleswoman named Desi about whom Debbie and Jodi gossip, mostly in terms of Jodi hating that Desi exists at all. Pete owns his own record label, but it struggles financially as he promotes the reunion of Graham Parker & The Rumour.

Debbie and Pete also deal with conflict between their daughters, 13-year-old Sadie and 8-year-old Charlotte. For Debbie's 40th birthday, the couple goes on a romantic weekend to a resort. There they get high on marijuana cookies and fantasize out loud about ways they would kill each other.

After speaking with her friends Jason and Barb, Debbie decides to improve her marriage and family through exercise and strengthening her relationship with her father. She tells Pete he needs to stop lending his father Larry money because it is hurting them financially, but he fails to follow through with this.

Meanwhile, Debbie learns she is pregnant but decides not to tell Pete. Later, she yells at a student, Joseph, who had an online argument with Sadie on Facebook leading to a confrontation between Pete and Joseph's mother, Catherine.

Debbie takes Desi out dancing at a club, where she plans to confront her about $12,000 in missing store funds that Jodi has told her were stolen by Desi. They meet several players from the Philadelphia Flyers hockey team there. Debbie awkwardly finds out that one of the players wants to hang out with her and possibly sleep with her. Though flattered, she reveals that she is married, has two children, and is pregnant. He responds with politeness and they part on good terms.

Pete and Debbie deal with Sadie and Charlotte's constant fighting, which puts an additional strain upon the family. They meet with the school principal, but the couple denies Catherine's accusations, and when she starts using the same foul language they had used previously, the principal dismisses them. When Debbie confronts Desi about the missing funds, Desi reveals that she works as an escort and is able to afford nice things because of it. Jodi confesses to stealing the $12,000 to support her OxyContin addiction, and Debbie fires her.

At Pete's 40th birthday party, the couple again argues about the money his father wants from them. Debbie argues with her father about not spending enough time in her life, and how he is perfect. Oliver then explains that his life is not perfect, and how he has always cared about her and loved her.

Later, Pete overhears Debbie talking about her pregnancy, and angrily leaves the house on his bicycle. Debbie and Larry pursue him, and after Pete cycles into a car door, he gets into an argument with the driver, who then punches him in the stomach.

Debbie and Larry take Pete to the hospital, where they reconcile, with Larry recognizing that she is the fighter who keeps the family together. Pete further realizes he is actually thrilled about having another child, and reconciles with Debbie.

Sometime later, Pete and Debbie are watching a small concert with Ryan Adams performing. She suggests he sign him to his label and they plan to talk to him as they finish watching the show.

== Cast ==
- Paul Rudd as Pete, Debbie's husband and a record label owner
- Leslie Mann as Debbie, Pete's wife and a shop owner
- Maude Apatow as Sadie, their 13-year-old daughter
- Iris Apatow as Charlotte, their 8-year-old daughter
- Jason Segel as Jason, Debbie's trainer
- Lo Mutuc (Note: Credited as Charlyne Yi) as Jodi, one of Debbie's employees
- Tim Bagley as Dr. Pellegrino, Debbie's gynecologist
- John Lithgow as Oliver, Debbie's father
- Albert Brooks as Larry, Pete's father
- Megan Fox as Desi, one of Debbie's employees
- Chris O'Dowd as Ronnie, one of Pete's employees
- Melissa McCarthy as Catherine
- Ryan Lee as Joseph
- Lena Dunham as Cat, one of Pete's employees
- Robert Smigel as Barry, Pete's friend
- Annie Mumolo as Barb, Debbie's friend
- Joanne Baron as Mrs. Laviati
- Ava Sambora as Wendy, Sadie's best friend
- Michael Ian Black as Bank Consultant
- Bill Hader as Desi's hook up customer (uncredited)
- Billie Joe Armstrong as himself
- Graham Parker as himself
- Ryan Adams as himself
- Tom Freund as himself
- Bob Andrews as himself
- Brinsley Schwarz as himself
- Martin Belmont as himself
- Andrew Bodnar as himself
- Steve Goulding as himself

Cameos

- Scott Hartnell
- Ian Laperrière
- James van Riemsdyk
- Matt Carle
- Wyatt Russell

== Release ==
This Is 40 was originally scheduled to be released on June 1, 2012. In May 2011, Universal postponed the release to December 2012, allowing the studio to use that date for their release of Snow White & the Huntsman; the Snow White film was seen as better competition with a rival 2012 Snow White film project, Mirror Mirror, by Relativity Media.

The premiere for This Is 40 was held on December 12, 2012, at the Grauman's Chinese Theatre, in Los Angeles. The film was released on December 21, 2012, opening in 2,912 locations nationwide.

=== Box office ===
During its opening weekend, This Is 40 grossed $11.58 million at the domestic box office.

By the end of its theatrical run, This Is 40 grossed approximately $67.5 million at the domestic box office, and approximately $20.5 million at the foreign box office, with a worldwide total of $88,058,786. While it had the lowest opening weekend for any of Apatow's films, it was a greater box-office success than his prior film, Funny People.

=== Critical reception ===
Rotten Tomatoes gives the film a 52% approval rating, based on reviews from 221 critics, with an average rating of 5.80/10. The website's critical consensus reads: "Judd Apatow definitely delivers funny and perceptive scenes in This Is 40, even if they are buried in aimless self-indulgence." On Metacritic, the film received a score of 59 out of 100, based on reviews from 39 critics, indicating "mixed or average reviews". Audiences polled by CinemaScore gave the film an average grade of "B−" on an A+ to F scale.

Robbie Collin of The Daily Telegraph gave the film two stars out of five, commending its premise but criticizing its execution. "This Is 40 is a comedy film about the hell of getting older in a place where aging naturally is the last taboo, and I only wish it lived up to that utterly inspired concept...every scene feels like an airbrushed composite of dozens of rambling takes, and 133 minutes is drainingly long for a story this sitcom-slight," he wrote.

Peter Travers of Rolling Stone gave the film three stars out of four, saying "There are big laughs here, and smaller ones that sting. Rudd and Mann are a joy to watch, especially when their comic darts draw blood, as when Debbie tells "charmboy" Pete that inside he's a dick. Cheers as well to a terrific supporting cast, including Melissa McCarthy as a mother from hell, John Lithgow as Debbie's withdrawn father, and the priceless Albert Brooks as Pete's dad, living off his son's dole to support his tow-headed triplets. This Is 40 doesn't build to a catharsis. It sometimes dawdles as it circles the spectacle of a marriage in flux. Yet Pete and Debbie's sparring yields some of Apatow's most personal observations yet on the feelings for husbands, wives, parents, and children that we categorize as love."

Michael Phillips of the Chicago Tribune said "More like This Is Whiny", giving the film two and a half stars out of four. "This Is 40 has its share of clever, zingy material, proving that writer-director Judd Apatow has lost none of his ability to land a punch line with the right, unexpected turn of phrase. 'My boobs are just ... gone,' bemoans Debbie, played by Leslie Mann, comparing hers with those of her employee, played by Megan Fox. Then comes the second line, building smartly on the setup: 'They didn't even say goodbye.' Mann is wonderful, a uniquely skillful comic and dramatic actor—wide-eyed yet merrily devastating when the venom's called for. Rudd can get away with murder on sheer charm. But it's easy, and sort of lazy, to establish jokes and entire scenes built upon mocking somebody's dialect, or the older daughter's obsession with Lost."

Richard Roeper gave the film a C− and called the film "a huge disappointment". His main complaint about the film was its running time and most of the unnecessary supporting characters.

The New Yorker's Richard Brody writes, This Is 40 "is the stuff of life, and it flows like life, and, like life, it would be good for it to last longer".

== Accolades ==
Date of ceremony	Award	Category	Recipients	Result	Ref.
June 20, 2013	ASCAP Film & Television Awards	Top Box Office Films	Jon Brion; Graham Parker	Won	
January 10, 2013	Critics' Choice Movie Award	Best Comedy Film	This Is 40	Nominated	
January 10, 2013	Critics' Choice Movie Award	Best Actor in a Comedy	Paul Rudd	Nominated	
January 10, 2013	Critics' Choice Movie Award	Best Actress in a Comedy	Leslie Mann	Nominated	
March 30, 2014	Empire Awards	Best Comedy	This Is 40	Nominated	
May 3, 2013	Golden Trailer Awards	Best Comedy	"Trailer 4"; Universal Pictures; Workshop Creative	Nominated	
May 3, 2013	Golden Trailer Awards	Best Comedy TV Spot	"Knocked Up"; Universal Pictures	Nominated	
May 3, 2013	Golden Trailer Awards	Best Comedy Poster	Universal Pictures; Cimarron Entertainment	Nominated	
October 22, 2012	Hollywood Film Awards	Hollywood Comedy Award	Judd Apatow	Won	
December 19, 2012	IGN Summer Movie Awards	Best Comedy Movie	This Is 40	Nominated	
December 18, 2012	Phoenix Film Critics Society Awards	Best Young Actress	Maude Apatow	Nominated	
May 5, 2013	Young Artist Award	Best Performance in a Feature Film - Supporting Young Actress	Maude Apatow	Nominated	

== Home media ==
This Is 40 was released for Blu-ray and DVD in the United States on March 22, 2013. The disc features an unrated and also theatrical version of the film, as well as numerous bonus features.

== Sequel ==
Director Judd Apatow stated he is interested in a possible sequel, shifting the focus off married couple Pete and Debbie and moving it onto their budding teenage daughter Sadie. During an interview on March 30, 2013, Apatow was questioned about the prospect of a sequel to This Is 40. He admitted to being intrigued by the idea.

In March 2022, it was reported Apatow was in early development of writing a script, with the film set ten years after the previous, titled This is 50.
