= The Bubble (2022 film) =

American comedy film

- Release poster
- Directed by: Judd Apatow
- Written by: Judd Apatow; Pam Brady
- Produced by: Judd Apatow
- Starring: Karen Gillan; Vir Das; Pedro Pascal; Iris Apatow; Fred Armisen; Maria Bakalova; David Duchovny; Keegan-Michael Key; Leslie Mann; Kate McKinnon; Peter Serafinowicz; Guz Khan; Harry Trevaldwyn
- Cinematography: Ben Smithard
- Edited by: Dan Schalk; James Thomas
- Music by: Michael Andrews; Andrew Bird
- Production company: Apatow Productions
- Distributed by: Netflix
- Release date: April 1, 2022
- Running time: 124 minutes
- Country: United States
- Language: English

The Bubble is a 2022 American comedy film directed by Judd Apatow from a screenplay co-written with Pam Brady. The film features an ensemble cast that includes Karen Gillan, Vir Das, Pedro Pascal, Iris Apatow, Fred Armisen, Maria Bakalova, David Duchovny, Keegan-Michael Key, Leslie Mann, Kate McKinnon, Guz Khan, Peter Serafinowicz, and Harry Trevaldwyn. It follows the cast and crew of a blockbuster action franchise who attempt to film a sequel while quarantining at a posh hotel during the COVID-19 pandemic.

The Bubble was released on April 1, 2022, by Netflix. It received negative reviews.

== Plot ==
Following a problematic film role that nearly destroyed her career, actress Carol Cobb is offered the chance to revive it by reprising her role as the heroic Dr. Lacey Nightingale in the sixth installment of the wildly popular Cliff Beasts franchise: Cliff Beasts 6: Battle for Everest – Memories of a Requiem. Having turned down appearing in the fifth film in favor of doing the aforementioned panned role, Carol initially fears that her former Cliff Beasts castmates may hold a grudge against her.

One of the first major film productions to resume amid the impact of the COVID-19 pandemic on cinema, the Cliff Beasts cast arrive at a swanky English hotel and must self-quarantine for two weeks. Afterward, a welcome back party is organized for the cast and crew. Here, Carol happily reunites with co-stars Dustin, Howie, and Sean, but has an awkward meeting with Lauren, the only Cliff Beasts co-star appearing bitter about her absence. There are two series newcomers: Dieter, a respected but indifferent veteran actor, and Krystal, a young TikTok sensation brought in to attract a younger demographic. The latter quickly bonds with Carla, a deadpan on-set production assistant who's her age. Director Darren Eigan, an enthusiastic but frazzled indie filmmaker, tries to boost morale and make the shoot special, coming off as pretentious. He clashes with Dustin, who constantly bombards him with revised versions of the script to fit his own vision. Dieter has a crush on Anika, the hotel's sweet front desk clerk, but she wants to build a proper relationship first before jumping into sex.

Filming begins and for the first few days, everything appears to be okay. But a series of events delays the production further. During a group meditation session, Howie becomes paranoid and quits the film in a panic. In consequence, his Cliff Beasts character is killed off gruesomely. Bored in the hotel, Krystal and Carla sneak out to party in the city. This gains traction online and gets Krystal canceled for her behavior, losing many of her followers. Later the cast tests positive for influenza, linked to a delivery girl who gave them their morning coffee. Despite being ill, the studio forces them to film. Introduced is the mysterious Mr. Best, the head of a new security team from the studio to oversee the cast and film's production, making some of the cast suspicious. When the shoot starts back up again, Carol realizes that most of her character's dialogue and actions have either been given to Krystal or omitted entirely, making her suspect this is how the studio is getting back at her for leaving the franchise. Carol has a heart-to-heart with Darren, telling him her concerns, but when he talks to the higher-ups about giving back her dialogue, it backfires.

Lauren tries to escape from the hotel in a frenzy one night. Mr. Best's men graphically shoot one of her hands off, leaving her in the hospital for the remainder of the shoot. Infuriated, Carol tries to rally her castmates and fight for their rights. Shortly afterward, while filming an elaborate dancing TikTok with Krystal, Dieter collapses. They quickly work together to revive him; Anika succeeds, cementing their relationship. This event inspires the team, and they plan a getaway. As they shoot the climax, Dustin creates a distraction by clashing with Darren about the script revisions while the rest of the cast leave the set and try to avoid getting caught by Mr. Best and his men.

The cast meets up at the helipad, calling upon an unsure Sean to fly them out. A furious Darren tries to stop them from leaving, but is knocked out by Dustin. Inside the helicopter is Anika, who hopes to run away with Dieter, who happily accepts. Sean gets the helicopter off the ground but doesn't know how to fly it forward. The rest of the crew encourage Sean to fly the helicopter away from the hotel as the Cliff Beasts cast celebrate their victory.

Two years later, a documentary detailing the troubled production and antics on set, Beasts of the Bubble, is released to rave reviews and praise from the public. While Carol is described as "the villain" of the film, she's proud of the project. Dieter and Anika's relationship is still strong. Lauren is in good spirits, having a robotic hand. Meanwhile, Darren is signed on to direct a movie based on Skittles.

== Cast ==
- Karen Gillan as Carol Cobb, a washed-up actress portraying Dr. Lacey Nightingale in the Cliff Beasts franchise.
- Pedro Pascal as Dieter Bravo, a serious veteran actor portraying a new character and tragic villain named Gio in Cliff Beasts 6 while coping with addictions to both sex and hard drugs.
- Vir Das as Ronjon, the owner of the hotel playing host to the Cliff Beasts 6 cast and crew.
- Fred Armisen as Darren Eigan, a former indie filmmaker hired to direct Cliff Beasts 6.
- Iris Apatow as Krystal Kris, a TikTok superstar who joins the Cliff Beasts 6 cast as the character Vivian Joy. An uncredited Maude Apatow also briefly portrays Kris in a parodic scene.
- Leslie Mann as Lauren Van Chance, an actress who portrays a Cliff Beasts fan favorite character named Dolly, as well as Dustin’s on-and-off love interest.
- David Duchovny as Dustin Mulray, the workaholic lead of the Cliff Beasts franchise who portrays the character Dr. Hal Packard, as well as Lauren’s on-and-off love interest.
- Keegan-Michael Key as Sean Knox, an actor who portrays the Cliff Beasts character Colt Rockwell and promotes himself as a wellness guru when not on-camera.
- Guz Khan as Howie Frangopolous, an actor who portrays Jarrar, the comic relief character of the Cliff Beasts franchise.
- Peter Serafinowicz as Gavin, executive producer of the Cliff Beasts franchise.
- Maria Bakalova as Anika, a hotel clerk propositioned by Dieter.
- Samson Kayo as Bola, the cast coordinator.
- Ross Lee as Mr. Best, the head of security.
- Harry Trevaldwyn as Gunther, the awkward COVID-19 safety officer.
- Nick Kocher as Scott Dawson, the behind-the-scenes stills photographer.
- John Cena as Steve, the Stunt Coordinator.
- Galen Hopper as Carla, Steve's daughter.
- Kate McKinnon as Paula, the studio executive overseeing the Cliff Beasts franchise.
- John Lithgow as Tom, the Studio Chairman.
- Austin Ku as Li, the Executive Chairman.
- Maria Bamford as Krystal's mother
- Rob Delaney as Marti, Carol’s duplicitous agent
- James McAvoy as himself.
- Beck as himself.
- Daisy Ridley as Kate.
- Ivy Wolk as an anti-Krystal YouTuber.

== Production ==
It was announced in November 2020 that Judd Apatow's next film was to be produced for Netflix, with the film being about the production of a film during the COVID-19 pandemic. The Bubble was written by Apatow and Pam Brady. It was inspired by the production of Jurassic World Dominion (2022), which was filmed during the pandemic with its actors living together in a hotel during the shoot.

In February 2021, Karen Gillan, Iris Apatow, Fred Armisen, Maria Bakalova, David Duchovny, Keegan-Michael Key, Leslie Mann, Pedro Pascal and Peter Serafinowicz were cast in the film. On March 16, 2021, Vir Das, Rob Delaney, Galen Hopper, Samson Kayo, Guz Khan, Nick Kocher, Ross Lee, Harry Trevaldwyn, and Danielle Vitalis joined the cast.

Principal photography began on February 22, 2021, and concluded on April 16 in the United Kingdom at Shepperton Studios in Shepperton, Hedsor House in Hedsor and Cliveden House in Taplow.

== Reception ==
On Rotten Tomatoes, the film has an approval rating of 20% based on 118 reviews, with an average rating of 3.9/10. The website's critics consensus reads: "Meandering and mostly unfunny, The Bubble gums up an all-star cast with hackneyed gags about showbiz and pandemic life." Metacritic assigned the film a weighted average score of 34 out of 100 based on 34 critics, indicating "generally unfavorable" reviews.

Apatow was nominated at the 43rd Golden Raspberry Awards for Worst Director for his work on the film.

== See also ==
- List of films featuring dinosaurs
