= The Bling Ring =

2013 film directed by Sofia Coppola

- Theatrical release poster
- Directed by: Sofia Coppola
- Screenplay by: Sofia Coppola
- Based on: "The Suspects Wore Louboutins" by Nancy Jo Sales
- Produced by: Roman Coppola; Sofia Coppola; Youree Henley
- Starring: Israel Broussard; Katie Chang; Taissa Farmiga; Claire Julien; Georgia Rock; Emma Watson; Leslie Mann
- Cinematography: Harris Savides; Christopher Blauvelt
- Edited by: Sarah Flack
- Music by: Brian Reitzell; Daniel Lopatin
- Production companies: American Zoetrope; NALA Films; Pathé; StudioCanal; Tobis Film; Tohokushinsha Film Corporation; FilmNation Entertainment
- Distributed by: A24 (United States); StudioCanal (United Kingdom); Pathé Distribution (France); Tobis Film (Germany); Tohokushinsha Film (Japan)
- Release dates: May 16, 2013 (Cannes); June 12, 2013 (France); June 14, 2013 (U.S.); July 5, 2013 (U.K.); August 15, 2013 (Germany); December 14, 2013 (Japan)
- Running time: 90 minutes
- Countries: France; United States; Germany; Japan; United Kingdom
- Language: English
- Budget: $8.2 million
- Box office: $20.2 million

The Bling Ring is a 2013 American crime film written and directed by Sofia Coppola featuring an ensemble cast led by Emma Watson, Katie Chang, Israel Broussard, Taissa Farmiga, Claire Julien, Georgia Rock and Leslie Mann. It is based on the 2010 Vanity Fair article "The Suspects Wore Louboutins" by Nancy Jo Sales, which dealt with a real-life gang known as the Bling Ring. The story follows a group of fame-obsessed teenagers who use the internet to track celebrities' whereabouts to burgle their homes.

The film was an international co-production by producers in the United States, the United Kingdom, France, Germany, and Japan. Coppola began developing a screenplay based on the burglaries in December 2011, with Francis Ford Coppola executive producing through American Zoetrope and Roman Coppola as producer. She saw it as a departure from her previous works by focusing on a group of teenagers who are "products of our growing reality TV culture", exploring consumerist tabloid culture and obsession with fame. Casting took place in early 2012 with Coppola choosing mostly young, unknown actors for the main roles. Principal photography occurred between March and April that same year in Los Angeles, California. Brian Reitzell served as supervisor for the film's soundtrack and co-wrote the musical score with Daniel Lopatin.

The Bling Ring had its world premiere on May 16, 2013, in the Un Certain Regard section of the 2013 Cannes Film Festival. In the United States, it had a limited theatrical release by A24 on June 14, 2013, before opening wide one week later. It received generally positive reviews from critics, with many praising the cast and Coppola's "stylish" direction; Watson in particular received critical acclaim for her performance. Others criticized the film for its morally ambiguous approach towards the subject matter. The film grossed $20 million worldwide against its $8 million budget.

The Bling Ring represents the final work of cinematographer Harris Savides, who died of brain cancer while the film was in post-production, to whom the film is dedicated.

The film faced criticism for its portrayal of race and departures from the real-life case. Critics accused the film of whitewashing and omitting the perspectives of immigrants and people of color.

== Plot ==
Quiet teenager Marc Hall transfers to Indian Hills High School in Agoura Hills, California. He befriends fame-obsessed Rebecca Ahn. While at a party at her house, Rebecca persuades Marc to sneak away with her and steal valuables from unlocked vehicles on the streets. As they begin hanging out regularly, Marc starts to view Rebecca as a sister figure.

One day, when Marc mentions that a wealthy acquaintance of his is vacationing in Jamaica, Rebecca convinces Marc to join her in breaking into the empty house, where she steals money, a handbag similar to one that her idol Lindsay Lohan has, cash and the keys to a Porsche, that they use to flee the scene. They go on a shopping spree with the money, buying luxury items. Marc visits a nightclub with Rebecca and meets her friend Chloe Tainer, along with sisters Nicki and Sam Moore. The group notices celebrities Kirsten Dunst and Paris Hilton. Later, while researching Paris on the internet, Marc and Rebecca learn she is out of town. They find her address, go to her house and on finding a key under the doormat, break in. They go through Paris's belongings and take some of her jewelry, including a bracelet that Rebecca later flaunts to Nicki, Sam, and Chloe at a party.

At Nicki's request, Rebecca and Marc take her, Sam, and Chloe back to Paris's house. They marvel at Paris's lavish lifestyle and steal shoes, bags, dresses, cash, and jewelry. A drunk Chloe gets into an accident while driving away; she is arrested and sentenced to community service. Marc and Rebecca return to rob Paris's house a third time and are nearly discovered by security. They then rob the home of Audrina Patridge, using the internet to determine when she will not be home, and later sell unwanted items at an outdoor market.

The group burgles the home of Megan Fox, Nicki's younger sister Emily squeezing through a pet door to get in. Nicki discovers a handgun inside, and Sam playfully threatens Marc with it before taking it to her boyfriend Rob's home. When he grabs her, the gun goes off, though no one is injured. The group later robs the home of Orlando Bloom and his girlfriend, Miranda Kerr. Marc finds a case filled with seven of Orlando's Rolex watches and a roll of cash. Chloe helps Marc sell the watches to her friend Ricky, a nightclub manager. The teens later return to Paris's house with Rob, who finds and steals large amounts of jewelry.

A news report containing security footage from the robbery at Patridge's home concerns Marc, but Rebecca is undeterred. She instigates a burglary at the home of Rachel Bilson, and the group ultimately breaks into Lindsay Lohan's house and robs it. Shortly thereafter, Rebecca moves to Las Vegas with her father, ostensibly due to troubles at home, leaving some of her stolen items with Marc. Media coverage of the Hollywood Hills burglaries intensifies, the public labeling the criminals "The Bling Ring". The authorities identify the group using security footage, statements from peers who heard the teens brag about their exploits, and photographs of the stolen items posted by the group on social media sites. Marc, Nicki, Chloe, Rebecca, Rob, and Ricky are arrested; Sam, who was not caught on camera, is able to avoid suspicion.

A remorseful Marc cooperates with the police, informing them of details of the burglaries, much to the chagrin of Rebecca, whom he identifies as the ringleader. A Vanity Fair journalist interviews Marc, still apparently exhibiting regret for his actions, but amazed at how much attention he has got and Nicki, who claims the others were at fault and she is a religious humanitarian. When the group is prosecuted, they receive varying amounts of jail time and are ordered to pay millions of dollars in restitution for the stolen items. Marc is transported to prison, alone among various older criminals.

Some time later, Nicki recounts her 30 days in jail on a talk show and reveals that Lindsay was in the same facility at the same time. She then turns to the camera and promotes her website, where people can learn everything about her "journey".

== Cast ==
- Israel Broussard as Marc Hall (based on Nick Prugo)
- Katie Chang as Rebecca Ahn (Rachel Lee)
- Emma Watson as Nicolette "Nicki" Moore (Alexis Neiers)
- Taissa Farmiga as Sam Moore (Tess Taylor)
- Claire Julien as Chloe Tainer (Courtney Ames)
- Carlos Miranda as Rob Hernandez (Roy Lopez Jr.)
- Gavin Rossdale as Ricky (Johnny Ajar)
- Leslie Mann as Laurie Moore (Andrea Arlington-Dunn)
- Georgia Rock as Emily Moore (composite character based on Gabby Neiers and Diana Tamayo)
- Annie Fitzgerald as Kate (Nancy Jo Sales)
- Stacy Edwards as Mrs. Hall
- G. Mac Brown as Henry
- Marc Coppola as Mr. Hall
- Janet Song as Mrs. Ahn
- Doug DeBeech as Adam
- Erin Daniels as Shannon
- Halston Sage as Amanda
- Patricia Lentz as Judge Henley
- Maika Monroe as Beach Girl
- Logan Miller as Kid at Party

Cameos

- Paris Hilton as herself
- Kirsten Dunst as herself
- Brett Goodkin as himself

== Production ==
=== Development ===
In December 2011, it was reported that Sofia Coppola was developing a screenplay for a film based on the Bling Ring burglaries, to be directed and produced by herself. Her father, Francis Ford Coppola, executive produced the project through his American Zoetrope production company. In April 2012, it was announced that financing had been set up with NALA Films and Roman Coppola would also serve as a producer.

Coppola described the group of teenage criminals as "products of our growing reality TV culture". The female characters in the film were seen as a departure from Coppola's previous works centered around the female perspective. Discussing the difference between the female perspective in Lost in Translation versus The Bling Ring she says that instead of a woman trying to find herself in a new foreign country, The Bling Ring deals with "girls trying on other people's stuff to find themselves". Although The Bling Ring deals with more consumerist and gaudy sense of style and culture Coppola says the film was "just really fun to indulge this style that's so different from my own. I'm more associated with being understated and [with] good taste, I think, and it's fun to be really obnoxious."

=== Casting ===
Coppola chose to use young, unknown actors (aside from Emma Watson) who were the same age as the real kids because of the freshness they brought to the film. Watson joined the cast of the film on February 29, 2012, and on March 1, Taissa Farmiga was reported to have joined the main cast. Also in early March, The Hollywood Reporter confirmed the casting of Leslie Mann and Israel Broussard. On March 16, Claire Julien joined the cast, and Katie Chang and Georgia Rock were also confirmed for roles. That same month, Carlos Miranda was cast in a supporting role. In late March, Kirsten Dunst and Paris Hilton were both confirmed to have cameos in the film as themselves. Gavin Rossdale was filming his scenes around the same time.

=== Filming ===
Production primarily took place in and around Los Angeles, California, in March and April 2012, notably in West Hollywood, Lynwood, and Venice. Some scenes were filmed in the celebrity victims' homes and at the Century Regional Detention Facility in Lynwood, California. The film was shot digitally using RED Epic cameras.

Cinematographer Harris Savides was diagnosed with brain cancer in 2010. During production, his illness forced him to exit the production, and he was replaced by his longtime camera operator Christopher Blauvelt. Savides and Blauvelt are jointly credited as cinematographer on the final film. Savides died in October 2012, shortly after principal photography wrapped, and the film was dedicated to his memory.

== Soundtrack ==
The Bling Ring: Original Motion Picture Soundtrack

Soundtrack album by Various Artists
- Released: June 11, 2013
- Genre: Film soundtrack
- Length: 1:19:44
- Label: Def Jam Records

"I spent a few months listening to everything that is out now and then going back a bit to when the story actually happened. So the Kanye stuff was fair game, as well as the newer stuff. The Can stuff is interesting because the other side is the score, the sound of L.A. at night when they're driving around. I thought that it would be really cool to use Klaus Schulze and some of the German stuff that I really, really love, and it's amazing how well those tracks fit next to each other."

— Reitzell, on the variety of music

The Bling Ring: Original Motion Picture Soundtrack was supervised by frequent Coppola collaborator Brian Reitzell. The soundtrack album was released on June 11, 2013, by Def Jam Recordings. It contains a mix of music ranging between such genres as hip-hop/rap, krautrock, and electronic.

The musical score for the film was written by Reitzell in collaboration with Daniel Lopatin, known mostly under the recording name of Oneohtrix Point Never. Coppola's husband's band, Phoenix, also contributed the title track from their album Bankrupt!.

Reitzell worked closely with Coppola to find contemporary music that would fit within the film's setting. After being contacted for song contributions, rapper Kanye West recommended Reitzell use Frank Ocean's then-unreleased "Super Rich Kids."

Tracklist

Track listing
No.	Title	Writer(s)	Performer	Length
1.	"Crown on the Ground"	Alexis Krauss, Derek E. Miller	Sleigh Bells	3:49
2.	"9 Piece"	William Leonard Roberts II, Dwayne Carter, Lexus Lewis	Rick Ross featuring Lil Wayne	5:17
3.	"Sunshine"	Ryeisha Berrain, Maya Arulpragasam	Rye Rye featuring M.I.A.	3:22
4.	"212"	Azealia Banks, Jef Martens	Azealia Banks featuring Lazy Jay	3:26
5.	"Ouroboros"	Daniel Lopatin	Oneohtrix Point Never	2:02
6.	"Money Machine"	Tauheed Epps, Christopher Gholson	2 Chainz	4:42
7.	"Bad Girls"	Mathangi Arulpragasam, Nate Hills, Marcella Araica	M.I.A.	3:48
8.	"All of the Lights"	Kanye West, Jeff Bhasker, Stacy Ferguson, Malik Yusef El Shabbaz Jones, Scott Mescudi, Warren Trotter	Kanye West	4:59
9.	"Drop It Low"	Christopher Maurice Brown, Ester Dean, Jamal F. Jones	Ester Dean featuring Chris Brown	3:14
10.	"Gucci Bag"	Gemar Akoto, Kwadwo Boateng, Reem Oweti	Reema Major	3:54
11.	"Halleluhwah"	Michael Karoli, Jaki Liebezeit, Irmin Schmidt, Holger Schweizer, Kenji Suzuki	Can	5:36
12.	"Power"	Kanye West, Larry Griffin Jr., Mike Dean, Jeff Bhasker, Andwele Gardner, Ken Lewis, Francois Bernheim, Jean-Pierre Lang, Boris Bergman, Robert Fripp, Michael Giles, Greg Lake, Ian McDonald	Kanye West	4:52
13.	"Freeze"	Klaus Schulze	Klaus Schulze	6:39
14.	"FML"	Joel Zimmerman	Deadmau5	6:35
15.	"The Bling Ring Suite"	Brian Reitzell, Daniel Lopatin	Brian Reitzell and Daniel Lopatin	6:52
16.	"Bankrupt!"	Thomas Mars, Deck d'Arcy, Laurent Brancowitz, Christian Mazzalai	Phoenix	6:56
17.	"Super Rich Kids"	Christopher Breaux, Malay, Thebe Neruda Kgositsile, Kirk Robinson, Nathaniel Robinson Jr., Ray Hammond, Mark Morales, Mark Rooney	Frank Ocean featuring Earl Sweatshirt	5:04
Total length:				1:19:44

== Distribution ==
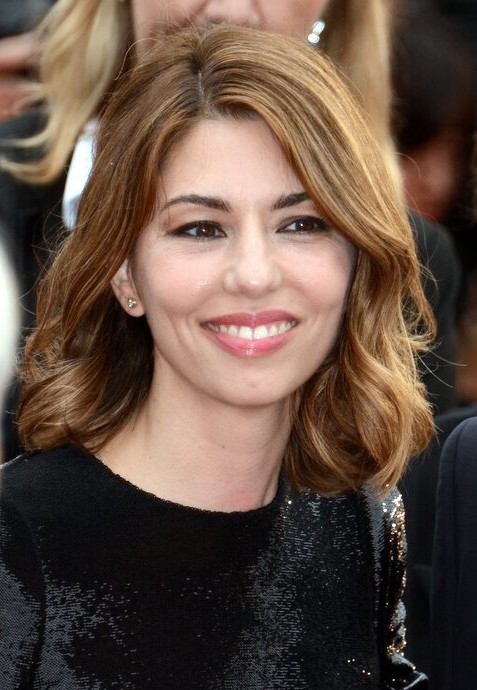
Coppola at the 2013 Cannes Film Festival for the premiere

=== Release ===
In January 2013, A24 acquired domestic distribution rights to the film. It opened the Un Certain Regard section of the 2013 Cannes Film Festival on May 16. About the premiere in Cannes, Coppola said, "It seems like the perfect setting for The Bling Ring when you see people walking around in their heels. It's a glamorous place, so it feels appropriate." The film closed the 39th Seattle International Film Festival on June 9, 2013.

=== Home media ===
The Bling Ring was released via digital download on September 6, 2013, and on DVD and Blu-ray on September 17, 2013, by Lionsgate Home Entertainment. The extras include a behind the scenes making-of documentary, a short piece about the real Bling Ring, and a tour by Bling Ring target Paris Hilton of her home (which was a crime scene as well as a filming location).

== Reception ==
=== Box office ===
In its debut weekend in the United States, the film opened in five theaters and earned $214,395, for a per-theater average of $42,879. It was Coppola's best opening per-theater average, beating out Lost in Translation's intake of $40,221 for each of 23 locations in 2003. The following weekend, The Bling Ring expanded to 650 theaters, earning $2 million, for a per-theater average of $3,080. The film went on to gross $5.8 million domestically and $20 million worldwide.

=== Critical response ===
Review aggregator website Rotten Tomatoes reported that 59% of 207 critics gave the film a positive review, with an average rating of 6.3/10. The website's critical consensus reads, "While it's certainly timely and beautifully filmed, The Bling Ring suffers from director Sofia Coppola's failure to delve beneath the surface of its shallow protagonists' real-life crimes." Metacritic has assigned the film an average score of 66 out of 100, based on 40 critics, indicating "generally favorable" reviews. The film has drawn comparisons to the Day-Glo cinematography of Harmony Korine's Spring Breakers, which was also released under A24 Films.

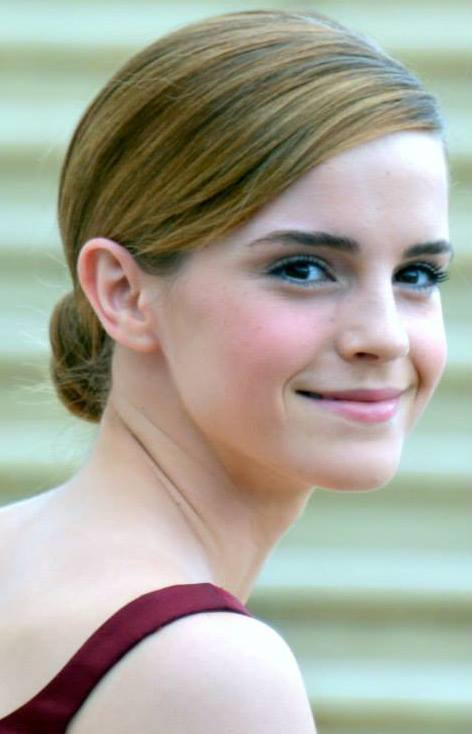
Emma Watson's performance received critical acclaim.

Owen Gleiberman of Entertainment Weekly had a positive opinion, writing, "Watching The Bling Ring, the audience is invited to understand the impulses of these child-woman thieves, even as Coppola stands firmly apart from their craziness and sees them for who they are." Robbie Collin of The Daily Telegraph stated, "Everything comes together for the good here: visuals, performances, raucous soundtrack, Coppola's teasing flirtation with, yet ultimate lack of commitment to, some kind of concrete morality." Todd McCarthy of The Hollywood Reporter was less positive, stating, "Coppola's attitude toward her subject seems equivocal, uncertain; there is perhaps a smidgen of social commentary, but she seems far too at home in the world she depicts to offer a rewarding critique of it."

Watson's performance as Nicki Moore was critically acclaimed. Richard Roeper called her "comedic gold," while Gleiberman wrote that Watson "proves that her willingness to take chances is only growing and that she's an actress serious enough to turn a line like 'Your butt looks awesome!' into something that reveals character." Cath Clarke of Time Out commented positively on Watson, saying, "The real story here isn't the good-girl-goes-bad stunt casting; it's that Watson can act. Against the odds, the Harry Potter star gives a sharp, knowing smart performance as Nicki." Peter Travers of Rolling Stone wrote, "Watson is sensational as Nicki, an underage club girl and actress wanna-be, who lives in a universe of Valley Girl narcissism eons away from Hogwarts." Even critics who gave the film overall negative reviews singled out Watson for praise, with Peter Howell of the Toronto Star stating, "The undistinguished young cast of The Bling Ring has just one standout, and that's Emma Watson, who plays one of the most vacuous of the juvenile thieves. We know her best as the brainy Hermione Granger from the Harry Potter movies, and she can obviously do brainless equally well." Joe Neumaier of New York Daily News wrote, "Watson, though, does a great imitation of hollow-eyed gaze; her character is the one who tries to parlay notoriety into success (everyone else can, she figures). The one-time Harry Potter star captures the slack-jawed fan only too well."

=== Criticism ===
The Bling Ring received criticism from several commentators regarding its portrayal of race and its adaptation of the real-life "Bling Ring" burglaries.

Writing for Jezebel, Meagan Hatcher-Mays argued that the film minimized the racial diversity of the actual group and centered its narrative on white participants, describing the adaptation as an example of whitewashing. In ThinkProgress, Alyssa Rosenberg argued that the film's depiction of affluent white teenagers engaging with hip-hop culture raised questions about white privilege and cultural appropriation, while giving limited attention to the racial dynamics surrounding the real events. Aura Bogado of Colorlines criticized the film for omitting the perspectives of immigrants and people of color affected by the burglaries, particularly Colombian immigrant Diana Tamayo, whose experiences were not depicted in the film. Bogado argued that the omission obscured issues of race, class, and immigration that were present in the real-life case.

=== Accolades ===
Year	Award	Category	Recipient(s)	Result
2013	Cannes Film Festival	Un Certain Regard Award	Sofia Coppola	Nominated
2013	Women in Film Crystal + Lucy Awards	Dorothy Arzner Directors Award	Sofia Coppola	Won
2013	International Online Cinema Awards	Best Supporting Actress	Emma Watson	Nominated
2013	Indiana Film Journalists Association Awards	Best Supporting Actress	Emma Watson	Nominated
2013	Village Voice Film Poll	Best Supporting Actress	Emma Watson	Nominated
2014	Golden Trailer Awards	Best Independent TV Spot	"Roster" Trailer (A24)	Nominated
2014	Golden Trailer Awards	Best Teaser Poster	The Bling Ring (Pathé)	Nominated
