= A Birder's Guide to Everything =

- Theatrical release poster
- Directed by: Rob Meyer
- Written by: Rob Meyer; Luke Matheny
- Produced by: Kristen Duncan Fuller; Lisa K. Jenkins; Dan Lindau; R. Paul Miller
- Starring: Kodi Smit-McPhee; Katie Chang; Alex Wolff; James Le Gros; Daniela Lavender
- Cinematography: Tom Richmond
- Edited by: Vito DeSario
- Music by: Jeremy Turner
- Production companies: Dreamily Pictures; Escape Pictures; Lavender Pictures
- Distributed by: Screen Media Films; Focus World
- Release dates: April 21, 2013 (Tribeca Film Festival); March 21, 2014 (United States)
- Running time: 86 minutes
- Country: United States
- Language: English

A Birder's Guide to Everything is a 2013 independent film starring Kodi Smit-McPhee, Alex Wolff, Michael Chen, Katie Chang, James Le Gros, Daniela Lavender and Sir Ben Kingsley. It was written by Rob Meyer and Luke Matheny and directed by Rob Meyer. The film had its world premiere at the Tribeca Film Festival on April 21, 2013, and was released in a limited release and through video on demand on March 21, 2014, by Screen Media Films and Focus Features.

== Premise ==
The film follows the story of teenage birders who go on a road trip to find the (possibly) extinct Labrador duck. It was based on Rob Meyer's short film "Aquarium" which won an Honorable Mention at Sundance in 2008. Kenn Kaufman was an ornithological consultant and appears in the film at approximately 74 minutes.

== Cast ==
- Kodi Smit-McPhee as David Portnoy
- James LeGros as Donald Portnoy
- Daniela Lavender as Juliana Santos
- Katie Chang as Ellen Reeves
- Alex Wolff as Timmy Barsky
- Zandi Holup as Evelyn Reed
- Michael Chen as Peter Nessbaum
- Tobias Campbell as Rob Lindau
- Joel Van Liew as Mr. Edbrooke
- Daniel G.S. Berger as Scarsdale High School Capt
- Ben Kingsley as Lawrence Konrad

== Release ==
The film had its world premiere at the Tribeca Film Festival on April 21, 2013. Shortly after it was announced Screen Media Films and Focus Features had acquired distribution rights to the film. The film went on to screen at the Austin Film Festival on October 26, 2013. and was released in a limited release and through video on demand on March 21, 2014.

== Reception ==
On the review aggregator website Rotten Tomatoes, 87% of 23 critics' reviews are positive. The website's consensus reads: "A Birder's Guide to Everything may not be a rare find, but it's surely a heartfelt sight for sore eyes nestled between perfectly hatched performances." Metacritic, which uses a weighted average, assigned the film a score of 61 out of 100, based on 12 critics, indicating "generally favorable" reviews.

The New York Times described it as a "smart, likeable, coming of age film [...] an eye opener for anyone who takes the everyday natural world for granted." USA Today wrote that "not since Rob Reiner's Stand by Me has such a compelling rite-of-passage film emerged."

The Guardian wrote that "you don't have to be a birder to enjoy it. The movie shows that seeking the rare and elusive is often more than just a physical quest; it also is a spiritual journey that changes the seeker."
