= Andrea Arlington =

American life coach and model

- Born: Madison, Wisconsin, U.S.
- Other names: Andrea Neiers; Andrea Dunn
- Education: Madison East High School; Emerson Theological Institute
- Occupations: life coach, television personality, model, minister
- Spouses: Mikel Neiers (divorced) Jerry Dunn (divorced)
- Children: 2, including Alexis Haines

Andrea Arlington, formerly Neiers and Dunn, is an American life coach, writer, minister, former television personality, and former model. She began her career as a pin-up model in the 1980s, appearing in Playboy and eventually moving to Los Angeles to act in sitcoms. She worked as a manager for her daughter, Alexis Haines, and was a main cast member, along with her daughters and foster daughter, on the 2010 E! American reality television series Pretty Wild. She appeared in the 2022 Netflix documentary series The Real Bling Ring: Hollywood Heist, which covers her daughter's role in the crime group the Bling Ring.

Arlington is a follower of the New Thought Movement and is an ordained minister of the Church of Religious Science, serving at the Global Truth Center of Los Angeles. She is a certified life coach through the International Coaching Federation, specializing in family recovery and relationships, and founded the organization Families United for Recovery. Arlington authored the book Revelations of a Bad Mom: Journey of Loving Your Child into Recovery and Healing Your Family.

== Early life and marriages ==
Arlington grew up in Madison, Wisconsin and graduated from Madison East High School.

When she was twenty-one years old, her brother Ben died from substance abuse. Shortly after her brother's death, Arlington began booking small acting roles on sitcoms in Los Angeles, where she met Mikel Neiers, a Hollywood cinematographer known for working as the director of photography on Friends and Spin City. Arlington married Neiers and had two children with him, Alexis and Gabrielle. She lived the life of an affluent Los Angeles housewife. Arlington and Neiers later divorced due to Neier's infidelity, and Arlington lived in poverty while struggling to find work. She married a second time to Jerry Dunn, a production designer for television. She and Dunn later divorced.

== Career ==
=== Modeling ===
Arlington lived with a transgender woman who taught her how to do hair and makeup, and helped her get her first national magazine cover when she was fourteen years old, taking her on a Greyhound bus to a modelling audition in Chicago. Arlington signed with Elite Model Management and began modeling lingerie as a pin-up model at the age of sixteen, eventually appearing in Playboy.

=== Reality television ===
In 2010, Arlington and her family were the main focus of the American reality television series Pretty Wild, produced by Chelsea Handler, Barry Katz, and Dan Levy. The series documented their lives as they lived in Westlake Village and Hollywood Hills West, where Arlington managed her daughter's and foster daughter's modelling careers and home-schooled them. During the filming of the show, Arlington's daughter, Alexis, was arrested for her involvement in the Bling Ring, a crime group that broke into the homes of celebrities including Orlando Bloom, Audrina Patridge, Paris Hilton, Rachel Bilson, and Lindsay Lohan. The show chronicled part of Alexis' trial.

In 2022, she was featured in the Netflix crime documentary The Real Bling Ring: Hollywood Heist.

=== New Age Thought and Religious Science ===
Arlington became fascinated with Rhonda Byrne's book The Secret about the pseudoscientific law of attraction and Norman Vincent Peale's book The Power of Positive Thinking. She joined the New Thought Movement and became affiliated with Religious Science, and was ordained as a minister.

Arlington received a doctorate in consciousness studies from the Emerson Theological Institute and works as Religious Science Minister serving at the Global Truth Center of Los Angeles. She works as an International Coaching Federation certified life coach, specializing in family recovery and relationships, and founded Families United for Recovery. She wrote the book Revelations of a Bad Mom: A Journey of Loving Your Child into Recovery and Healing Your Family.

== Portrayal in popular culture ==
Arlington is the basis for Leslie Mann's character, Laurie Moore, in the 2013 crime film The Bling Ring.
