= Iris Apatow =

American actress (born 2002)

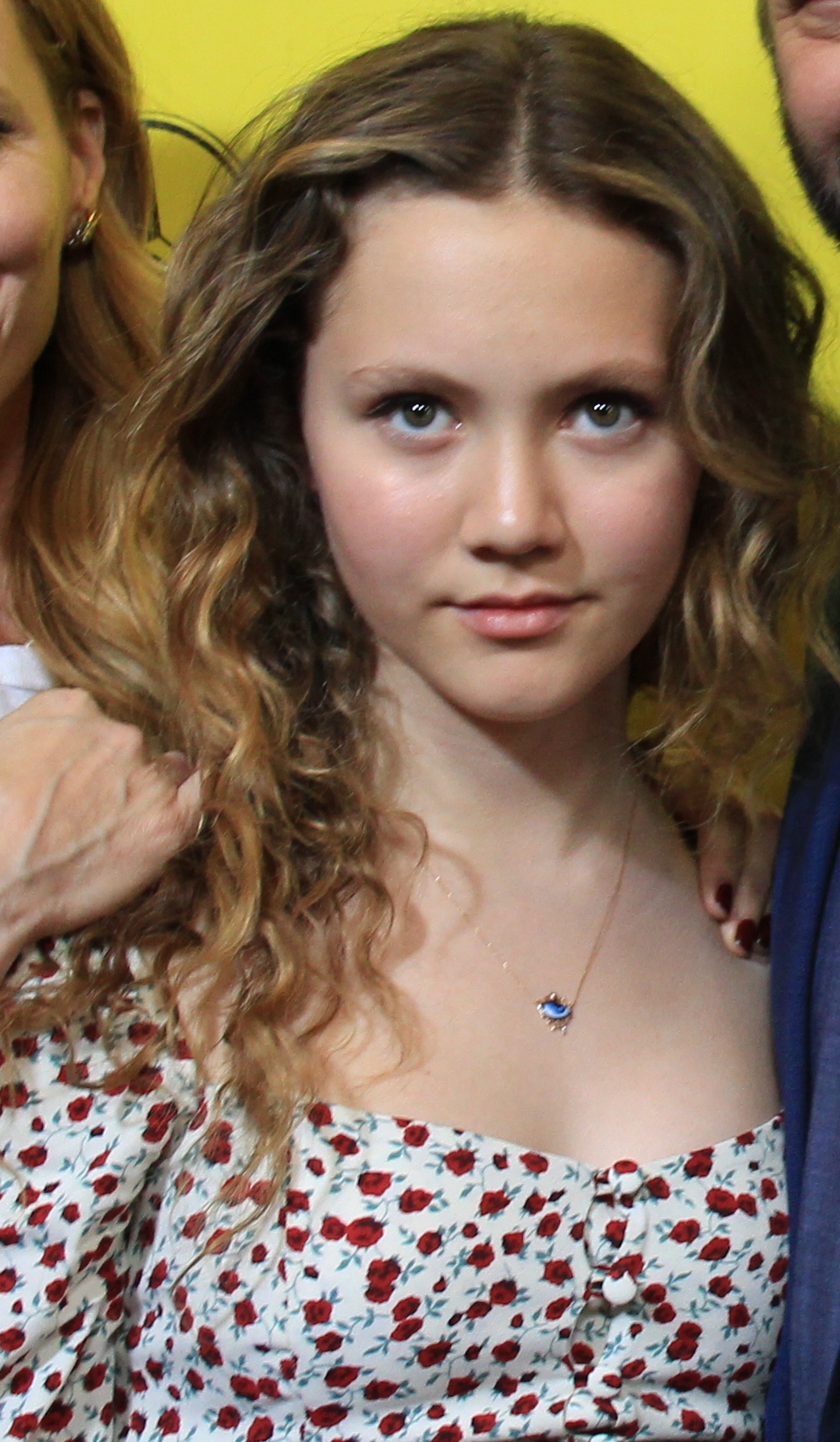
- Apatow in 2018
- Born: October 12, 2002 (age 24)
- Occupations: Actress; socialite
- Years active: 2007–present
- Partner: Sam Nivola (2024–present)
- Parents: Judd Apatow (father); Leslie Mann (mother)
- Relatives: Maude Apatow (sister)

Iris Apatow (/ˈæpətaʊ/; born October 12, 2002) is an American actress. She portrayed Arya Hopkins in the Netflix series Love and Krystal Kris in the 2022 Netflix film The Bubble.

== Early and personal life ==
Iris Apatow was born on October 12, 2002, to actress Leslie Mann and filmmaker Judd Apatow. Her father's family is Jewish, whereas her mother is Roman Catholic and her maternal great-grandmother was of Finnish ancestry. Her sister is actress Maude Apatow, with whom she worked on This is 40, Funny People, and Knocked Up. She graduated from high school in 2021.

Apatow was previously in a relationship with Ryder Robinson, son of actress Kate Hudson and singer Chris Robinson. Since 2024, she has been in a relationship with actor Sam Nivola, son of actors Emily Mortimer and Alessandro Nivola. The couple live together in an apartment in New York with a pet cat called Kumo.

Her personal relationships with celebrities have received much media attention, particularly with singer-songwriter Olivia Rodrigo, as well as singer-songwriter Billie Eilish and influencers Charli D'Amelio and Avani Gregg.

== Career ==
Apatow began acting at age 5, when she appeared as Charlotte in the film Knocked Up, directed by her father.

In 2016, Apatow appeared on the Netflix series Love as Arya Hopkins, the young star of a TV series. In 2026 she will appear in the upcoming Hunger Games: Sunrise on the Reaping as Proserpina Trinket.

== Filmography ==
=== Film ===
Key
†	Denotes films that have not yet been released

Year	Title	Role	Notes
2007	Knocked Up	Charlotte	
2009	Funny People	Ingrid	
2012	This Is 40	Charlotte	
2016	Sausage Party	Berry Good Candies/Grape #3/Coconut Milk (voices)	
2021	Sour Prom	Herself	Concert film
2022	The Bubble	Krystal Kris/Vivian Joy	
2024	Young Werther	Sissy	
2026	Pretty Lethal	Zoe	
2026	Magazine	Daphne	
2026	The Hunger Games: Sunrise on the Reaping	Proserpina Trinket	
TBA	Stung †	Jess	Post-production

=== Television ===
Year	Title	Role	Notes
2016–2018	Love	Arya Hopkins	Recurring role
2024	Unstable	Georgia	8 episodes
2026	Tell Me Lies	Amanda	

=== Music videos ===
Title	Year	Artist(s)	Director(s)	Ref.
"Sonora"	2017	Spendtime Palace	Finn Wolfhard; Josh Ovalle	
"Bad Idea Right?"	2023	Olivia Rodrigo	Petra Collins	
