= Bling Ring =

Group of convicted thieves in Calabasas, California, in the late 2000s

- Named after: Female celebrity targets
- Founding location: Calabasas, California, U.S.
- Years active: 2008–2009
- Territory: Los Angeles County, California
- Leaders: Rachel Lee, Nick Prugo
- Activities: Burglary
- Notable members: Rachel Lee; Nick Prugo; Alexis Neiers; Diana Tamayo; Courtney Ames; Johnny Ajar; Roy Lopez, Jr.

The Bling Ring (also known as Hollywood Hills Burglar Bunch, The Burglar Bunch, and the Hollywood Hills Burglars) was a group of seven teenagers and young adults based in and around Calabasas, California, convicted of multiple thefts.

They broke into the homes of several high-profile celebrities over a period believed to have been between October 2008 through August 2009. Their activities resulted in the theft of about $3 million in cash and belongings. Much of the stolen property belonged to socialite Paris Hilton, whose house was broken into several times, though over fifty homes were reportedly targeted.

== Bling Ring members ==
=== Rachel Lee ===
Lee lived in Calabasas, California with her mother. She has mentioned she had the smallest house in her neighborhood and was ashamed of her Korean heritage and struggled to make friends. She was expelled from Calabasas High School and later attended Indian Hills High School, an alternative school that awarded her a creative arts scholarship upon graduating. A year later, she was fined and put on probation for petty theft after she and Diana Tamayo stole $85 of merchandise from a Sephora cosmetics store. According to fellow burglar Nick Prugo, Lee was obsessed with reality television. Toward the end of the crime spree, Lee moved to Las Vegas to live with her father. She was sentenced to four years in prison, and was released after 16 months.

=== Nick Prugo ===
Nicholas Frank Prugo transferred to Indian Hills High School after being expelled from Calabasas High School for excessive absences. In 2003, Prugo had a role as "Kenny" in Little Lost Souls: Children Possessed, a made-for-TV quasi-documentary about the exorcism of children whose parents believed them to be possessed by evil. In June 2006, Nick and his family moved to Calabasas where he eventually met Rachel Lee. According to Nick, their first crime together involved stealing a wallet out of a parked car and going on a shopping spree with the credit cards found inside. Lee befriended Prugo after he arrived at Indian Hills and introduced him to most of the other people who would eventually join the crime spree. The two initially bonded over their interest in fashion and social media. After being accepted into her circle of friends and participating in their nightlife activities, Prugo became hooked on drugs and began stealing from his parents to support his addiction. The first home they burgled together occurred during the summer after tenth grade, when he claims that Lee suggested they burgle the residence of an acquaintance from Woodland Hills whom Prugo knew to be out of town at the time. Prugo claims to have been reluctant but did not want to risk losing her friendship. During that first burglary, they reportedly discovered $8,000 in cash hidden under a bed. They split the money, and the next day went on a shopping spree on Rodeo Drive. Prugo and Lee began checking the doors of expensive cars parked in their neighborhood to see if they were unlocked on an almost nightly basis. They would take credit cards found in the cars and go shopping the next day in areas like Melrose Avenue. They would be dressed well, and according to Prugo, merchants never questioned their use of the cards. He was sentenced to two years in state prison after pleading no contest to three counts of first-degree residential burglary. He was released from prison on probation after serving one year.

=== Alexis Neiers ===
Alexis Neiers had been part of Lee's social circle at Indian Hills. She claims to have only been involved in the one burglary of Orlando Bloom’s house.

Police searched her home and reported that they found stolen items in the possession of Neiers, her sister Gabrielle, and their adopted sister Tess Taylor, and that she was caught on camera leaving the scene of the crime with stolen bags. She initially denied any wrongdoing, but later changed her plea in court to no contest.

Neiers was sentenced to six months in jail and three years of probation, and was also ordered to pay $600,000 in restitution to Orlando Bloom.

=== Diana Tamayo ===
Diana Tamayo was the student body president at Indian Hills, where she had been voted "best smile" and been awarded a $1,500 "Future Teacher" scholarship after graduation. Along with Lee, she had been fined and put on probation for engaging in petty theft. According to Prugo, her entire wardrobe consisted of stolen items. Her small size was utilized during one burglary in which she gained the group access to a home by crawling through a dog door. She was also an undocumented immigrant and was initially threatened with deportation by the police to get her to cooperate.

=== Courtney Ames ===
Courtney Ames was a Calabasas High School student and an "old friend" of Lee's. It was through Ames that the others met Lopez and Ajar, her boyfriend.

=== Johnny Ajar ===
Johnny Ajar, a former convict, is not believed to have participated in the burglaries, but was recruited by Ames, his girlfriend, to sell some of the stolen items for cash. He was raised in housing projects around Reseda, outside of the group's community, the son of a career criminal and drug addict. He had previously spent two years in federal prison, having been convicted for drug trafficking in Wyoming at age 22. Ajar first met Ames and her friends at a nightclub called The Green Door and allowed them access, even though they used fake identification documents. At the time of the burglaries, he worked as a promoter for club Les Deux Café. Until he was caught, he held a "day job" in the file room of a (now defunct) LA law firm.

=== Roy Lopez Jr. ===
Roy Lopez and Ames had worked together at a restaurant and bar in Calabasas. Ames had recruited him as a reseller, and he also participated in burglarizing at least one victim, Paris Hilton, from whom he is alleged to have stolen $2 million in jewelry, which he carried out with him in a Louis Vuitton bag. He was unable to sell most of it.

== Reported victims ==
The group targeted media figures known for their fashionable tastes and stylish, status-driven lifestyles. Their primary targets were female, having been chosen, in the words of Prugo, "mainly because [of] women wanting women's stuff". If the members liked a celebrity's style, they became determined to steal the celebrity's clothes. Lee referred to their capers as "going shopping." They found the houses of their targets using Google Maps and determined when the victims would be away by researching their schedules, such as appearances at celebrity events, through websites including Facebook and Twitter. When Lee wanted to add to her wardrobe, or more cash was desired, a burglary would be undertaken. The Los Angeles Police Department report later stated that what began as a "twisted adventure" fueled by celebrity worship "quickly mushroomed into an organized criminal enterprise." In the words of Neiers, Lee "was so manipulating, so conniving. Nick always did what she said. Rachel was in charge. She started it all."

=== Paris Hilton ===
For their first celebrity target, Prugo claims that he and Lee asked themselves, "Who would leave a door unlocked? Who would leave a lot of money lying around?" and chose Paris Hilton because they figured she was "dumb." On their maiden trip to Hilton's home, Prugo and Lee went alone, having used Google Earth to find a place to access her community via a hill climb. They went up to the front door and tried ringing the doorbell to see if anyone was there. They discovered a key under the doormat, but then realized it was not needed because the door was unlocked. Once inside, Prugo served as a lookout near the stairs. At the same time, Lee went into the bedroom and searched through Hilton's belongings. Prugo and Lee, later accompanied by other members of their group, ended up burgling Hilton's residence at least five different times, mostly of designer clothing and money. However, it was not until Lopez single-handedly stole nearly $2 million in jewelry, clothing, cash, and other items from Hilton that she reported having been burglarized. Antics during the Hilton burglaries included snorting cocaine, which Prugo claims they found inside the residence. According to Ames, at one point Prugo discovered that he could fit into Hilton's footwear, and did a "victory dance" wearing a pair of her high-heeled shoes; Prugo subsequently denied ever wearing Hilton's shoes. Later, Hilton agreed to having the film The Bling Ring shot in her house where the burglaries took place.

=== Audrina Patridge ===
The ring burglarized the home of Audrina Patridge on February 22, 2009, the night of that year's Academy Awards ceremony. They accessed her home in Hollywood Hills by entering an unlocked door and took jewelry, her passport, her laptop computer, and custom-fit jeans. The value of what they took was estimated to amount to around $43,000. Lee and Prugo were recorded on Patridge's surveillance videos, which Patridge uploaded to her website. Despite the videos being posted, the burglaries continued.

=== Rachel Bilson ===
Rachel Bilson's home was burglarized by the group three to six times during April and May 2009, amounting to between $130,000 and $300,000 of stolen property.

Prugo claimed to have always been very nervous during the burglaries, but said that Lee was always very calm and focused — so much so that during a burglary of Bilson's home on May 9, Lee used Bilson's bathroom.

The Bilson burglaries yielded so much in the way of clothes and accessories that members tried to relieve themselves of some of it by selling it at the Venice Beach boardwalk, where they were able to make a few thousand dollars.

=== Orlando Bloom and Miranda Kerr ===
The Ring targeted Orlando Bloom's home on July 13, 2009, because Lee wanted the lingerie of Bloom's then-girlfriend (and later ex-wife), Victoria's Secret model Miranda Kerr. Prugo, Neiers, Lee and Tamayo accessed the premises by cutting through a security fence. Once inside, they stole a large amount of high fashion-label clothing, Bloom's vintage Rolex watch collection, Louis Vuitton luggage, and artworks; in all totaling nearly half a million dollars. Neiers, who denies having gone there knowingly, was high on heroin at the time and was reported as having gone outside to vomit and then urinate in the bushes. Tamayo and Lee went back inside because the latter was planning to move to her father's home in Las Vegas and wanted Bloom's art to decorate with.

=== Brian Austin Green and Megan Fox ===
Brian Austin Green's home was targeted, because, according to Prugo, Lee liked the clothes of his wife at the time, actress Megan Fox. While there, the group also found and took Green's SIG Sauer .380 semi-automatic handgun, which police later found in the possession of Ajar.

=== Lindsay Lohan ===
Even though by August 2009 Lee had moved into her father's place in Las Vegas, she felt compelled to return to California for yet another burglary, the target being Lindsay Lohan, who was Lee's "ultimate fashion icon" and "biggest conquest." On the 23rd, Lee, Prugo, and Tamayo allegedly stole around $130,000 worth of clothes and jewelry from Lohan's home in Hollywood Hills. According to Prugo, Tamayo and Lee were "freaking out" over Lohan's things. By that time, they were well-publicized criminals at large. Prugo was especially worried about the burglary, knowing that if they were captured by surveillance cameras stealing from the star's home, the footage would be widely seen.

== Investigation and criminal proceedings ==
Alexis Neiers informed police that Lee and Prugo were responsible for the Lohan burglary during an anonymous phone call. Prugo's face had been captured on surveillance at the home, and the police determined through Facebook that Lee and Prugo were friends. Prugo was arrested and initially denied having had anything to do with the burglaries, but said that anxiety due to his involvement was preventing him from being able to eat, sleep, and breathe normally, and made him lose his hair. He confessed to the police without first getting a plea deal, telling them about crimes they were not even aware had been committed. He also told the police the ring was still researching other potential targets, among them Miley Cyrus, Zac Efron, Ashley Tisdale, Hilary Duff, and Vanessa Hudgens.

Two weeks after Prugo's confessions, search warrants for the other ring participants were issued by the Los Angeles Police Department. Lee, Tamayo, Ames, Neiers, and Lopez were all subsequently arrested for their connection to the burglaries. Lee was taken into custody while at her father's home in Las Vegas. Police reported that she calmly asked them hypothetical questions about how it might help her if she did have information and shared that information with the police. Their report stated that she believed she had removed all incriminating evidence from her home. However, police found a coat identified as belonging to Lohan and topless pictures of Hilton left in an unlocked safe in Hilton's home. Seeing this, Lee was reported to have instantly turned hysterical, acting as though she were suddenly sick and gagging as though she were going to vomit. Other items reported to have been seized from Lee were a jar of marijuana and more than $20,000 in $100 bills.

People magazine reported that the ring members except for Lee were booked for residential burglary, with bail set at $50,000. Simultaneously, Lee was held for "possession of stolen property," with bail set at only $3,000. However, Vanity Fair reported that Lee was charged with residential burglary for the Lohan, Hilton, and Patridge heists. At the time of the arrests it was unclear whether the burglary of the Bilson residence and other burglaries of the Kourtney Kardashian and Hayden Panettiere homes had been committed by the group. Among items reportedly seized by police from Ajar were three guns, drugs, and a laptop computer with aerial photos of 51 homes in Hollywood Hills. He was thus charged with additional offenses related to weapons and drug possession. Whereas Lee was reportedly charged with three residential burglary counts, Prugo was charged with seven, each count carrying sentences between 2 and 6 years. All members initially pleaded not guilty.

=== Ajar ===
Ajar, who had previously been sentenced to three years in prison for selling cocaine, was initially faced with ten felony charges — six counts of possession for sale of a controlled substance, three counts of possession of a firearm by a felon, and one count of possession of ammunition — and pleaded not guilty to all of them. Later, however, he pleaded no contest for selling cocaine, possession of a firearm by a convicted felon, and one count of receiving stolen property. The stolen property charge referred to a Rolex watch owned by Orlando Bloom.

On April 15, 2010, Ajar was sentenced to three years in jail. He was released less than a year later, in March 2011.

Ajar was reported to be back in jail as of May 2013.

=== Neiers ===
After learning that Orlando Bloom was willing to testify against her, Neiers agreed to plead no contest to residential burglary. She was sentenced on May 10, 2010, to a jail term of 180 days, with an additional three years of probation, and was ordered to pay $600,000 worth of restitution to the actor. During her stay at the Century Regional Detention Facility, she occupied the same cell block as Bling Ring victim Lindsay Lohan, but says they never spoke to each other. After serving 30 days of her sentence, she was released.

In December 2010, Neiers was arrested again, this time for possession of heroin. Rather than being sentenced to further time behind bars, she was allowed to live at a luxury rehab facility in Malibu for a year, having been offered her stay free of charge by the facility's owner, who attended her hearing. She was at the facility from December 2010 until December 2011. In an entry posted to her blog in April 2013, she stated that she has been sober since then and has become a counselor interning at the facility. She is now married to Canadian businessman Evan Haines, whom she met at an Alcoholics Anonymous meeting.

As of early 2022, both Neiers and Haines announced their separation on Instagram. They both still co-parent their children.

=== Lee ===
Alleged ringleader Lee was sentenced on October 26, 2011. She had pleaded no contest to the burglary of over $25,000 worth of valuables from Audrina Patridge's home. Judge Larry Fidler dismissed a charge of conspiracy to commit burglary as well as two counts filed against her for receiving stolen property. He had also previously dismissed charges against her involving the Lohan burglary. Lee was sentenced to four years in prison.

While serving time, Lee participated in a disaster relief training program called Fire Camp. In March 2013, after having served one year and four months, she was released on parole.

=== Tamayo ===
On October 19, 2012, after pleading no contest to having burgled Lindsay Lohan's house, Diana Tamayo was sentenced to three years of probation, as well as 60 days of community service. If convicted at trial, she would have faced up to six years in prison. Her lawyer claimed she had admitted to police that she broke in after they threatened her family with "immigration consequences." She is reportedly pursuing a career in fitness and nutrition, and has credited God for turning her life around.

=== Lopez ===
Roy Lopez Jr. was sentenced on November 8, 2012, after pleading no contest to stealing over $2 million of jewelry from Paris Hilton. He was given three years of probation and credited for 100 days he had already served in jail. He reportedly left California for a job in Texas.

=== Ames ===
Courtney Ames was sentenced on December 14, 2012, to three years of probation and two months of community service. She had admitted to having received a jacket stolen from Paris Hilton. Still, charges against her of conspiracy to commit burglary, burglary, and receiving stolen property were dismissed in light of possible ethics violations on the part of detective Brett Goodkin, the main investigator in the Bling Ring case. She enrolled in college, where, according to her lawyer, she was studying psychology, speech, and child development.

=== Prugo ===
Having pleaded no contest to the burglaries of Patridge and Lohan, Nicholas Prugo was sentenced on April 15, 2013, to two years in prison. He received credit for a year of time already served, and was further credited with a year for good behavior and work time. He was reported to be living in Studio City as of June 2013.

=== Detective Brett Goodkin ===
Brett Goodkin, the chief investigator in the case, was approached as a consultant for The Bling Ring, Sofia Coppola's film adaptation of the case. He was later offered the opportunity to play himself in the film. However, he allegedly was not granted permission from his superiors to work on the film, and his involvement led to him being investigated. A potential conflict of interest was cited because when he was working with the filmmakers, the cases against the defendants had not yet been resolved.

== Popular media depictions ==
The Bling Ring, a television film documenting the group's activities, aired on Lifetime on September 26, 2011. This adaptation changes the names of the gang members. It starred Austin Butler as Zack Garvey (based on Nick Prugo), Yin Chang as Natalie Kim (based on Rachel Lee), Tracey Fairaway as Cherry Cox (based on Diana Tamayo), and Tom Irwin as Detective Archie Fishman (loosely based on Det. Brett Goodkin). Jennifer Grey had a supporting role as Garvey's mother, Iris.

Another film adaptation, also titled The Bling Ring, directed by Sofia Coppola was released theatrically in June 2013. The film, which starred Emma Watson (Alexis Neiers), Taissa Farmiga (Tess Taylor) and Leslie Mann (Laurie), as well as newcomers Israel Broussard (Prugo), Katie Chang (Lee), Claire Julien (Courtney Ames), and Georgia Rock (Gabby Neiers), also changes the names of the members. One of the ring's real-life victims, Paris Hilton, appeared as herself in the film. The film does not feature a character based on Tamayo, though her act of crawling through a pet door remained.

On April 25, 2022, a three-part documentary series titled Bling Ring: Hollywood Heist premiered on Channel 4, featuring interviews with Prugo and Alexis Neiers, as well as reconstructions of the group's crime sprees in the late 2000s. The docuseries was subsequently picked up by Netflix and released as The Real Bling Ring: Hollywood Heist on September 21, 2022. The HBO documentary The Ringleader: The Case of the Bling Ring premiered on October 1, 2023, focusing on Rachel Lee speaking out for the first time.

In 2010, the premiere episode of Law & Order: LA, titled "Hollywood", bases a Hollywood crime circle on the Bling Ring.

== See also ==
- Bling-bling
- Juvenile delinquency
