= Indian Hills High School (Agoura Hills, California) =

Location
- 28545 West Driver Avenue; Agoura Hills, CA 91301
- Coordinates: 34°9′1.25″N 118°44′56.05″W

Information
- Website: www.indianhillshs.net

Indian Hills High School is an alternative/continuation education high school in Agoura Hills, California, United States, serving students in grades 10–12. It is in the Las Virgenes Unified School District.

Originally the school was located in an old church building, in then Agoura, today Agoura Hills California. In 1978 the school was moved to a location in Calabasas, California. Calabasas. In 2008 Indian Hills relocated to the campus of Agoura High School in Agoura Hills to save money. The former campus was more recently used by New Village Leadership Academy, a private school.

== Previous students ==
Indian Hills High School was the school attended by five of the seven members of the group dubbed "The Bling Ring". Alexis Neiers, Rachel Lee, Nick Prugo, Courtney Ames and Diana Tamayo all attended the school prior to their arrests.
