= Maude Apatow =

American actress (born 1997)

- Apatow at the 2026 Met Gala
- Born: December 15, 1997 (age 28)
- Occupation: Actress
- Years active: 2005–present
- Parents: Judd Apatow (father); Leslie Mann (mother)
- Relatives: Iris Apatow (sister)

Maude Apatow (born December 15, 1997) is an American actress and filmmaker. She is best known for her portrayal of Lexi Howard in the HBO drama series Euphoria (2019–2026).

Apatow is the daughter of Judd Apatow and Leslie Mann, and her early acting roles were her playing her mother's on-screen daughter in Knocked Up (2007), Funny People (2009), and This Is 40 (2012), all films directed by her father. As an adult, Apatow joined the main cast of Euphoria, which remains her best known work to date, and appeared in the films Assassination Nation (2018) and The King of Staten Island (2020), as well as the Netflix miniseries Hollywood (2020). She has also appeared in stage productions at the West End and the Westside Theatre.

== Early life ==
Apatow was born on December 15, 1997, to filmmaker Judd Apatow, and actress Leslie Mann. Her father is Jewish, though non-practicing, and her mother is Roman Catholic. She has a younger sister, Iris Apatow, who is also an actress, and through her father, she is the great-granddaughter of the late record producer Bob Shad. Apatow graduated from the Crossroads School, a private college-preparatory school in Santa Monica, California, where she appeared in school productions of Cabaret and Into the Woods. In 2016, she enrolled in the School of Communication at Northwestern University in Evanston, Illinois to study theater. She decided to leave the program in 2018, after having been cast as Lexi Howard in the HBO teen drama Euphoria.

== Career ==
=== 2005–2015: Career beginnings and comedies ===
Apatow began acting at the age of seven with a role in her father Judd Apatow's 2005 comedy film The 40-Year-Old Virgin, though her scenes ultimately did not make the film's final cut. She then appeared in the 2007 film Knocked Up, which was also written, produced, and directed by her father. She and her younger sister Iris Apatow played Sadie and Charlotte, respectively, the daughters of their real-life mother Leslie Mann's character. She again appeared alongside her sister as the daughter of Mann's character in her father's 2009 film Funny People, playing the role of Mable. Apatow reprised her Knocked Up role in the 2012 spin-off sequel This Is 40, starring Mann and Paul Rudd's characters. For her performance in the film as Sadie, Apatow was nominated for the 2012 Phoenix Film Critics Society Award for Best Young Actress and the 2013 Young Artist Award for Best Performance in a Feature Film - Supporting Young Actress.

After joining Twitter, Apatow was noted to have a large online following, which helped her become a contributor to Zooey Deschanel's website HelloGiggles as a writer and interviewer. Her work on the site as well as her acting roles earned her a spot on the Forbes 30 Under 30 list in 2012. Apatow's Twitter account had more than 62,000 followers by 2012, and it was named one of the best Twitter feeds by Time magazine in 2013. In 2015, Apatow played an audience member in the film Pitch Perfect 2. That same year, she also recurred in the fourth season of the HBO comedy series Girls as Cleo. She appeared in three episodes of the series, on which her father was an executive producer.

=== 2015–present: Euphoria and stage debut ===
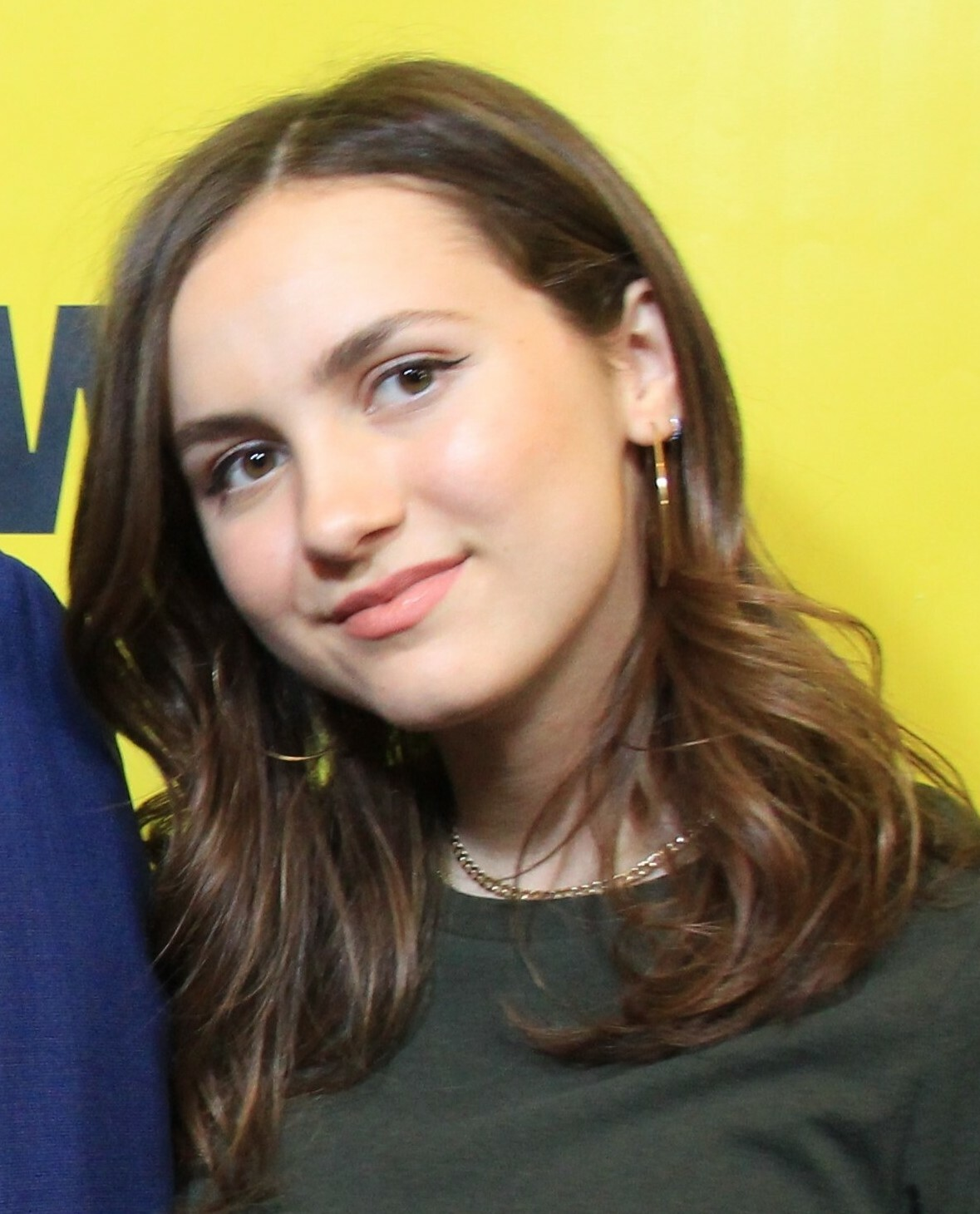
Apatow at the Blockers premiere in 2018

Apatow appeared as Alexandra Mulcahey in the 2016 comedy-drama film Other People, which was her first large role in a film not involving her father. In 2017, she played the role of Meredith Whitcomb in the film The House of Tomorrow and made her directorial debut with the short film Don't Mind Alice, which she co-wrote and co-directed alongside Olivia Rosenbloom. The following year in 2018, Apatow starred as Grace in the film Assassination Nation. The film's director, Sam Levinson, subsequently cast Apatow as a series regular in his HBO teen drama series Euphoria, which debuted in 2019; where she stars as Lexi Howard in the series, a role that Levinson wrote specifically for Apatow. In 2020, she co-starred in her father's comedy-drama film The King of Staten Island, as the sister of Pete Davidson's character.

In 2022, a viral social media post by Meriem Derradji described Apatow as a "nepo baby" for her family connections in the entertainment industry. This led to the term 'nepo baby' trending on TikTok as users pointed out numerous other celebrities with similar backgrounds. The term attained greater notoriety following New York publishing a year-end feature that called 2022 "The Year of the Nepo Baby," with a cover depicting Apatow among others.

Apatow made her New York theatrical debut Off-Broadway in 2023, replacing Lena Hall as Audrey in a revival of Alan Menken and Howard Ashman's Little Shop of Horrors, with a planned stint from February to April. The opportunity to appear on stage was available due to the delay in filming of the third season of Euphoria, with Apatow citing Little Shop of Horrors as an important musical for having "sort of introduced me to the genre as a whole" when she was a child. She subsequently extended an additional four weeks, through to the end of April. With her Little Shop run coming to a close, it was then announced that Apatow would join the West End revival of Cabaret from May 29, in the starring role of Sally Bowles. She completed her time with the show on September 23.

In April 2024, Apatow and longtime collaborator Olivia Rosenbloom launched Jewelbox Pictures, a film and television production company. The company's first project was Poetic License, Apatow's debut feature as a director, with a cast that included her mother in a starring role.

In 2025, Apatow was the recipient of the Max Mara Women in Film's Face of the Future award at Chateau Marmont in Los Angeles, California.

In 2022, Euphoria was renewed for a third and final season, and in 2024, it was confirmed that Apatow would be reprising her role as Lexi Howard. Filming took place in 2025, and the season premiered on HBO on April 12, 2026. The series concluded on May 31, 2026.

== Personal life ==
As of February 2024, Apatow maintains a residence in the West Village in Manhattan, New York City.

Since early 2024, Apatow has been in a relationship with Irish actor Patrick Gibson.

== Filmography ==
Key
†	Denotes productions that have not yet been released

=== Film ===
Year	Title	Role	Notes
2005	The 40-Year-Old Virgin	—N/a	Deleted scenes
2007	Knocked Up	Sadie	
2009	Funny People	Mable	
2012	This Is 40	Sadie	
2016	Other People	Alexandra Mulcahey	
2017	The House of Tomorrow	Meredith Whitcomb	
2017	Don't Mind Alice	—N/a	Short film Co-director and co-writer
2018	Assassination Nation	Grace	
2020	The King of Staten Island	Claire Carlin	
2025	One of Them Days	Bethany	
2025	Poetic License	—N/a	Director and producer
2025	Oh. What. Fun.	Mae-bell	

=== Television ===
Year	Title	Role	Notes
2015	Girls	Cleo	3 episodes
2019–2026	Euphoria	Lexi Howard	Main role; 26 episodes
2020	Hollywood	Henrietta Castello	5 episodes
2022–2023	Pantheon	Justine (voice)	6 episodes
2023	RuPaul's Drag Race All Stars	Herself	Guest Judge

=== Theatre ===
Year	Production	Role	Venue	Dates	Notes
2023	Little Shop of Horrors	Audrey	Westside Theatre	February 7 – April 30, 2023	
2023	Cabaret	Sally Bowles	Playhouse Theatre	May 29 – September 23, 2023	

== Accolades ==
Year	Award	Category	Work	Result	Ref.
2012	Phoenix Film Critics Society Award	Best Young Actress	This Is 40	Nominated	
2013	Young Artist Award	Best Performance in a Feature Film – Supporting Young Actress	This Is 40	Nominated	
