= Funny People =

2009 film by Judd Apatow

- Theatrical release poster
- Directed by: Judd Apatow
- Written by: Judd Apatow
- Produced by: Judd Apatow; Clayton Townsend; Barry Mendel
- Starring: Adam Sandler; Seth Rogen; Leslie Mann; Eric Bana; Jonah Hill; Jason Schwartzman
- Cinematography: Janusz Kamiński
- Edited by: Brent White; Craig Alpert
- Music by: Jason Schwartzman; Michael Andrews
- Production companies: Universal Pictures; Columbia Pictures; Relativity Media; Apatow Productions; Madison 23 Productions
- Distributed by: Universal Pictures
- Release dates: July 20, 2009 (Los Angeles); July 31, 2009 (United States)
- Running time: 146 minutes
- Country: United States
- Language: English
- Budget: $75 million
- Box office: $71 million

Funny People is a 2009 American black comedy-drama film written and directed by Judd Apatow, co-produced by Apatow Productions and Madison 23 Productions, and starring Adam Sandler, Seth Rogen and Leslie Mann, with Eric Bana, Jonah Hill and Jason Schwartzman in supporting roles.

The film follows a famous comedian who is diagnosed with a terminal disease, so tries to fix the relationships in his life while befriending an aspiring comedian.

The film was released by Universal Pictures on July 31, 2009. It received positive reviews from critics but only grossed $71 million against its $75 million budget. It was the final film produced by Madison 23 Productions, as Sandler retired the label after its release.

== Plot ==
George Simmons is a middle-aged retired stand-up comedian turned movie star. Despite his wealth, he is disillusioned and depressed as most of his recent film work is low-brow and poorly received. Diagnosed with acute myeloid leukemia, he is offered an experimental treatment that has only an 8% success rate. Believing he is about to die, George returns to his roots of stand-up comedy.

Ira Wright is an aspiring stand-up comedian in his 20s, sharing an apartment with his two best friends Mark and Leo and working in the food service industry to pay the bills. Mark successfully leads his own TV comedy series. Leo is a rising comedy star and recurring guest star on Mark's TV show. Ira has a crush on fellow comedian Daisy, but Mark promises to keep away from her only ten days.

George meets Ira at a small comedy club, where he bombs and Ira follows. George hires Ira as his assistant. Soon, Ira becomes one of his only close relationships. George gets two women to go home with them, but neither is interested in being with Ira, so he bangs both of them. Ira becomes his joke writer, opening for him in big comedy clubs, often meeting with real-life comedians who talk about the business.

George reconnects with his ex-fiancée Laura, currently married to Clarke. Once his physician tells him the leukemia is in remission, he decides he wants her back. Laura invites George and Ira to her house in Marin County while her husband is away on business. They spend quality time with her and her two young daughters. George and Laura sneak off to have sex, Clarke returns home and there is an altercation.

Laura faces a choice between her husband Clarke, who she suspects has cheated on her (he later confirms he received a happy ending at a massage parlor), or George (who also cheated on her many times). Ira is not always on George's side in the love triangle, and George eventually fires him. Ira then calls George out on having learned nothing from his near-death experience.

Ira returns to his old food-service job and starts dating his crush Daisy. After some time has passed, George attends Ira's stand-up act and sees that his old assistant has become a talented and competent performer. The next day, George finds Ira at work, revealing their friendship is important to him. They reconnect as friends, telling each other jokes as equals.

== Cast ==
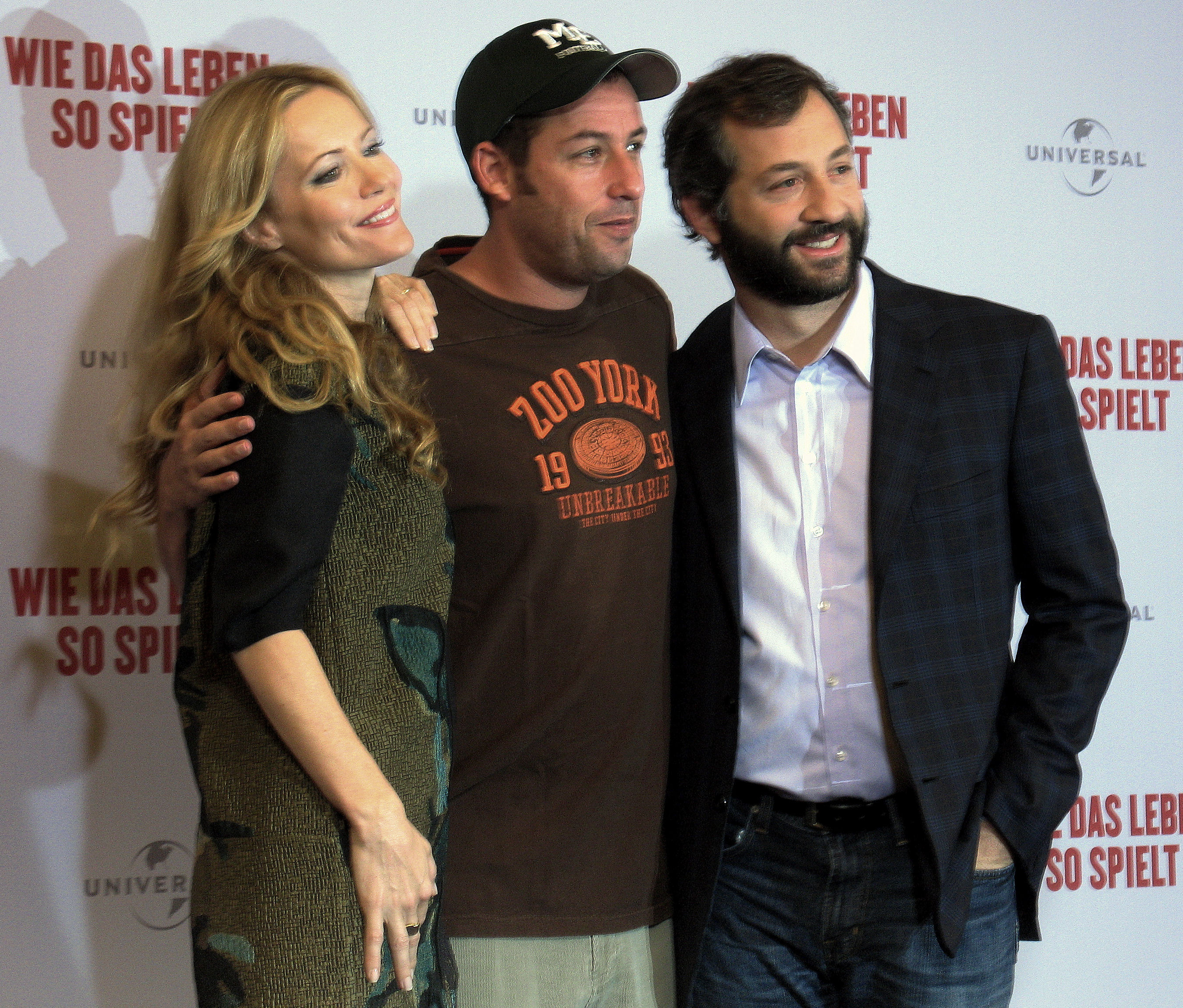
Leslie Mann, Adam Sandler and Judd Apatow in Berlin (2009)

- Adam Sandler as George Simmons, a retired comedian turned actor.
- Seth Rogen as Ira Wright, an aspiring comedian.
- Leslie Mann as Laura, George's ex-fiancée.
- Eric Bana as Clarke, Laura's husband.
- Jonah Hill as Leo Koenig
- Jason Schwartzman as Mark Taylor Jackson
- Aubrey Plaza as Daisy Danby
- Maude Apatow as Mable
- Iris Apatow as Ingrid
- Aziz Ansari as Randy Springs
- RZA as Chuck
- Torsten Voges as Dr. Lars
- Allan Wasserman as Dr. Stevens
- Wayne Federman as Comedy & Magic Manager
- Mike O'Connell as MySpace Escort
- Nicole Parker as Dawn
- Nydia McFadden as Mandy
- Nicol Paone as George's Sister
- George Coe as George's Dad
- Bryan Batt as George's Agent
- Maggie Siff as Rachel
- Tonita Castro as Bonita

Comedians Orny Adams, Dave Attell, Andy Dick, Charles Fleischer, Budd Friedman, Monty Hoffman, Carol Leifer, Al Lubel, Norm Macdonald, Rod Man, Jerry Minor, Paul Reiser, Ray Romano, Mark Schiff, Sarah Silverman, and George Wallace had cameos as themselves in the roles of George's fellow comedians, while comedians Tyler Spindel and Kyle Kinane respectively played a college guy with a camera and a paparazzo at the medical center. Rapper Eminem, musician James Taylor, and Myspace founder Tom Anderson also briefly appeared as themselves. Musicians Jon Brion, James Gadson, and Sebastian Steinberg appeared in the film as members of George's jam band. Actress Carla Gallo and comedian Bo Burnham appeared as characters on Yo Teach!, the television show within the film which stars Mark, while Justin Long and Apatow regular Ken Jeong had cameos as characters in the movies for which George is famous. In the film, the posters for George's films also featured actors Owen Wilson and Elizabeth Banks in them. Actors Steve Bannos and Elaine Kao had small roles respectively as a deli manager and a mom with a camera.

== Production ==
Judd Apatow had expressed his desire to make a stand-up comedian mentor film loosely based on his own early experiences as a struggling performer. He could not come up with an interesting idea, however, since most of his mentors were kind to him. He then thought of making a film about a mentor facing a life crisis, and decided to cast his former roommate Adam Sandler after seeing him in Reign Over Me. They discussed making the film almost two years prior to production.

Apatow had cast Sandler, Seth Rogen, and Leslie Mann as the three leads in March 2008. Eric Bana, Jonah Hill, and Jason Schwartzman were cast in June 2008 when the title of the film was announced. When asked about the decision to cast Bana, Apatow said that both he and Rogen are fans of his films; Rogen additionally commented they cast him as the husband because he was someone who would be considered an intimidating presence to both Sandler and Rogen. Bana mentioned that he decided to play the character with his native Australian accent so he would be more comfortable improvising. Apatow and Mann's daughters, Maude and Iris Apatow, play the young girls in the film. Both Apatow and Mann state that this casting choice allowed for more natural dialogue for the children, but the girls have not been allowed to actually see the film.

Academy Award-winning cinematographer Janusz Kamiński handled the cinematography for the film. Apatow had Sandler, Rogen, and Hill write their own material for routines. Apatow filmed them performing their routines in front of live audiences, using six cameras to capture their performances and audience reactions. Apatow filmed their entire performances, although only five to ten minutes of stand-up footage appear in the film. Hill admitted his performance was not well-received because he had never done stand-up before. Additionally, Apatow filmed scenes from Sandler's character's fictional filmography, as well as scenes from Schwartzman's character's fictional television show Yo Teach!, for the film to add realism.

Apatow used an old video of Sandler, from when the two were roommates, in which Sandler makes prank phone calls, and features a young Ben Stiller and Janeane Garofalo.

== Marketing ==
The first teaser poster for the film was released on November 13, 2008. That same day, Universal Pictures and MySpace partnered together to launch a contest that would allow people to have a part in the film by just writing a comment explaining why. Additionally, Apatow held a stand-up comedy concert event called "A Night of Funny People" at the Orpheum Theater in Los Angeles to film a scene for the movie. The event was open to the general public and featured acts by Adam Sandler, Seth Rogen, Aziz Ansari, Sarah Silverman, David Spade, and Patton Oswalt, with Sandler, Rogen, and Ansari performing as their characters in the film. The first theatrical trailer for the film was released on February 20, 2009, on the Internet, with a shortened version first appearing in theaters with I Love You, Man.

A website for a fictional television show-within-a-film was created on NBC.com. The sitcom, Yo Teach!, "stars" character Mark Taylor Jackson (Jason Schwartzman), a C-list actor portraying a young teacher with a class of failing students, and includes a cameo by internet celebrity Bo Burnham.

A website for Aziz Ansari's character Randy Springs was created, along with a documentary of the character on FunnyOrDie.com. The documentary was directed by Jason Woliner.

Comedy Central aired a special, "Inside Funny People" on July 20, documenting the making of the film and showing clips of the stand-up. On July 24, the channel also aired "Funny People: Live", a live broadcast stand-up featuring Sandler, Rogen, and Hill as part of the film's promotion.

== Release ==
Funny People premiered on July 20, 2009, in Los Angeles, California. It was released in all territories by Universal Pictures.

=== Home media ===
Funny People was released on DVD and Blu-ray in the United States on November 24, 2009, by Universal Studios Home Entertainment. There is a one-disc "Unrated & Theatrical" cut and a two-disc "Unrated Edition". The Unrated cut of the film runs at 153 minutes. It was released in the United Kingdom on January 18, 2010.

== Reception ==
=== Box office ===
Funny People grossed $51.9 million in the United States and Canada and $19.7 million in other territories for a worldwide total of $71.6 million, against a production budget of $75 million.

In North America, the film was released on July 31, 2009, in 3,007 theaters. It grossed $8.6 million on its opening day and $22.7 million on its opening weekend, finishing first at the box office.

=== Critical response ===
On Rotten Tomatoes, Funny People holds an approval rating of 69% based on 236 reviews and an average rating of 6.4/10. The site's critical consensus reads, "Funny People features the requisite humor, as well as considerable emotional depth, resulting in Judd Apatow's most mature film to date." Another review aggregator, Metacritic, gave the film a score of 60 out of 100, based on 36 critics, indicating "mixed or average" reviews. Audiences polled by CinemaScore gave the film an average grade of "B−" on an A+ to F scale.

Roger Ebert of the Chicago Sun-Times awarded the film 3 and a half of four stars, calling it "a real movie. That means carefully written dialogue and carefully placed supporting performances — and it's about something. It could have easily been a formula film...but George Simmons learns and changes during his ordeal, and we empathize." It is the highest rating Ebert ever gave an Adam Sandler film, tied with his review for Punch-Drunk Love. Peter Travers of Rolling Stone also praised the film, writing, "Apatow scores by crafting the film equivalent of a stand-up routine that encompasses the joy, pain, anger, loneliness and aching doubt that go into making an audience laugh."

Michael Phillips of the Chicago Tribune gave the film one of its mixed reviews, complaining of the film's two-and-a-half-hour running time: "Funny People is...an attempt by Apatow to reconcile the huge success he has become with the up-and-comer he once was. The results run an increasingly exasperating 2½ hours.".

Manohla Dargis of The New York Times complains the film is "irritatingly self-satisfied" and describes the film as "nice" ... "but nice can be murder on comedy and drama alike".

Gene Shalit of NBC's The Today Show stated that it's "a smirk of faithful characters that are making a vanity movie about themselves that keeps not ending for 2 1/2 unendurable hours. Director Judd Apatow wrote the script and it's vulgar, in fact, it's ineffable because without the letter F, he would have no script."

== Soundtrack ==
Funny People: Original Motion Picture Soundtrack

Soundtrack album by Various Artists
- Released: July 28, 2009
- Genre: Soundtrack
- Label: Concord Records

Professional ratings
Review scores
Source	Rating
PopMatters	Link

Funny People: Original Motion Picture Soundtrack was released on July 28, 2009.

1. "Great Day" by Paul McCartney (2:08)
2. "Wires" by Coconut Records (2:26)
3. "All the King's Horses" by Robert Plant and the Strange Sensation (4:19)
4. "Carolina in My Mind" (Live) by James Taylor (4:58)
5. "Keep Me in Your Heart" by Warren Zevon (3:27)
6. "Real Love" by John Lennon performed by Adam Sandler (4:56)
7. "We (Early Take)" by Neil Diamond (4:11)
8. "Jesus, Etc." (Live Summer '08) by Wilco feat. Andrew Bird (4:01)
9. "George Simmons Soon Will Be Gone" by Adam Sandler (2:15)
10. "I Am Young" by Coconut Records (3:07)
11. "Memory" by Maude Apatow & Larry Goldings (3:53)
12. "Numb as a Statue" by Warren Zevon (4:07)
13. "Photograph" by Ringo Starr (3:58)
14. "Watching the Wheels" (Acoustic Demo) by John Lennon (3:06)

Bonus tracks on the iTunes release:

15. "Secret O' Life (Live)" by James Taylor (3:55)
16. "Photograph" (Live) by Adam Sandler (2:55)
17. "Everybody Knows This Is Nowhere" by Adam Sandler (4:02)
18. "Nighttiming" by Coconut Records (2:48)

The film also features "Joanna" by Kool & the Gang, "Three Little Birds" by Bob Marley, "Diamond Dave" by The Bird and the Bee, "Man in the Box" by Alice in Chains, "(I've Had) The Time of My Life" by Bill Medley & Jennifer Warnes, "Walk Like an Egyptian" by The Bangles, "In Private" by Paul McCartney, "Cat Song" by Tomoko Kataoka and "Give Me Love (Give Me Peace on Earth)" by George Harrison. Songs from all four former members of The Beatles are in the film and in its soundtrack.

The Blu-ray and two-disc DVD includes a jam session of Adam Sandler and Jon Brion performing "Real Love", "Photograph", and a previously unreleased cover of The English Beat's "Save It for Later." (The band's original 1982 version of the song is used in the film.)

Additional songs that were used in the film's trailers are "We Will Become Silhouettes" by The Postal Service, "My Friend" by Dr. Dog, and "Nothing'severgonnastandinmyway (Again)" by Wilco.

== See also ==
- List of films featuring fictional films
