= Katie Chang =

American former actress

- Born: Katherine Chang; May 3, 1995 (age 31); Chicago, Illinois, U.S.
- Education: Northwestern University
- Years active: 2011–2023

Katherine "Katie" Chang (born May 3, 1995) is an American former actress. She is known for her roles as Rebecca Ahn in The Bling Ring (2013) and Maddie Kim in Pantheon (2022).

== Early life ==
Chang was born in Chicago and raised in Winnetka, Illinois. Her paternal grandfather was of Korean descent, while the rest of her ancestry is Irish and German. She was trained at the Wilmette Theatre's Actors Training Center. Chang graduated from New Trier High School in 2013 and matriculated at Columbia University that fall. In 2015, she transferred to Northwestern University. Chang graduated from Northwestern in 2017 with a degree in film.

== Acting career ==
In 2013, Chang earned praise for her portrayal of Rebecca Ahn, the leader of the title group in the satirical crime film The Bling Ring. Rolling Stone described her as "mesmerizing" while the Chicago Tribune called her a "performer of serious promise". Director Sofia Coppola explained her choice of casting such a "fresh face" in a lead role, saying, "There's sort of a naturalness, as opposed to having worked a lot, being kid actors." Also in 2013, Chang starred in the comedy film A Birder's Guide to Everything. She then had supporting roles in Anesthesia and The Outcasts. In 2022, Chang starred as the voice of Maddie in the critically acclaimed AMC+ animated series Pantheon, a performance that Variety called "profoundly human." She recorded the first season in 2020 and the second season in 2021 before officially retiring from professional acting.

== Personal life ==
Since the fall of 2022, Chang has worked in post-production operations for the visual effects company Framestore. She has also worked as an ESL teacher.

== Filmography ==
=== Film ===
Year	Title	Role	Notes
2011	CUTEeGRL	Fiona Malo	Short film
2013	The Bling Ring	Rebecca Ahn	
2013	A Birder's Guide to Everything	Ellen Reeves	
2015	Anesthesia	Amy	
2016	Imperfections	Miranda	
2017	The Outcasts	Claire Connors	
2017	Fatal Crossing	Marcy	
2018	Canal Street	Elizabeth Chu	
2018	All The Little Things We Kill	Carol	
2019	Daniel Isn't Real	Barista	
2019	I Want Candy	Jasmine	Short film
2020	InstaPsycho	Ava	
2020	A Handful of Rust	Simone	Short film

=== Television ===
Year	Title	Role	Notes
2021	9-1-1: Lone Star	Elise	Episode: "2100°"
2022–23	Pantheon	Maddie Kim (voice)	Main cast

=== Producer ===
Year	Title	Notes
2021	Screwed	Web series (5 episodes)
