= Alexis Haines =

American thief and television personality

Alexis Neiers
- Born: Alexis Christine Neiers; June 20, 1991 (age 35); Los Angeles, California U.S.
- Occupations: Reality TV personality, internet personality, podcast host
- Years active: 2009–2013, 2019–present
- Known for: Involvement in "Bling Ring"
- Television: Pretty Wild
- Spouse: Evan Haines (m. 2012; div. 2022)
- Children: 2
- Mother: Andrea Arlington

Alexis Christine Haines (née Neiers; born June 20, 1991) is a member of the Bling Ring and a former television personality. At the age of 18, she was arrested for her involvement in a string of burglaries that targeted the homes of multiple celebrities. Haines served one month of a six-month sentence after her conviction for one count of first degree residential burglary.

Haines starred in the reality television show Pretty Wild, but her struggles with addiction and the aftermath of being a part of the "Bling Ring" ended her Hollywood career goals. She got sober when she was 19, and started utilizing her platform to help others with drug problems, including becoming a columnist for Vice. Haines began hosting the podcast Recovering From Reality in 2019.

== Involvement in the "Bling Ring" ==
On November 16, 2009, Haines pleaded no contest to burglary charges stemming from her involvement with the Hollywood "Bling Ring" burglaries. The burglars had robbed the homes of celebrities including Orlando Bloom, Lindsay Lohan, Rachel Bilson, and Paris Hilton. Haines claimed to have been drunk during the burglary of Bloom's house, and "not sure what was going on". Co-defendant Nick Prugo recalled a different version of events, saying that Haines was fully aware a burglary was taking place, and is seen walking into the Bloom residence on security surveillance footage. A search of Haines' household turned up a Marc Jacobs handbag belonging to Bilson and a Chanel necklace belonging to Lohan. Haines initially denied the items were stolen. Haines claimed she was only involved in one robbery.

It appeared Haines was arrested on the set of reality show Pretty Wild, during the taping of the pilot episode, but she and her mother revealed in the 2022 Netflix three-part docuseries The Real Bling Ring: Hollywood Heist that the arrest had occurred off-camera. Instead, the scene that aired on the show was a fabrication carried out by E!'s production crew. Haines also admitted that she was one of the tipsters who implicated Prugo in the security footage that aired on TMZ.

On May 10, 2010, Haines pleaded no contest to a felony charge of first degree residential burglary of Orlando Bloom's home and was sentenced to 180 days in county jail, with three years' probation and a fine of US$600,000 (equivalent to $886,000 in 2025). Haines began her sentence on June 24, 2010, and was released after serving one month of a six-month sentence. During the last five days of her sentence, she was in a cell next to Lindsay Lohan.

She reported that she did not have any contact with Lohan during her brief time in jail and that Lohan did not cause any trouble.

=== In popular culture ===
Haines has been featured in two films chronicling events surrounding the "Bling Ring", both titled The Bling Ring. In the first, a made-for-TV film that originally aired on Lifetime in 2011, the character based on her is named Maddie Bishop and is played by Spencer Locke.

In the second film, which was directed by Sofia Coppola, British actress Emma Watson played the Haines-based character Nicolette "Nicki" Moore. The film premiered at the Cannes Film Festival, and was released nationwide on June 21, 2013. Haines has criticized her depiction in the 2013 film as inaccurate, alleging her role in the burglaries is exaggerated. Haines further called out Watson for negative comments Watson made about Haines' character in the film, saying she expected more empathy given the public knowledge that Haines had been sexually abused and was struggling with heroin addiction.

== Media, career and personal life ==
Haines was born to Mikel Neiers, a Hollywood cinematographer known for his roles as the director of photography on Friends and Spin City, and Andrea Arlington, an actress and model who was in Playboy in the 1980s. They divorced, and Arlington remarried Jerry Dunn, a production designer for television, whom she later divorced.

Haines has said that she struggled with her father "falling off the face of this earth and not being a father."

Haines dropped out of Indian Hills High School to pursue a career in Hollywood, while studying for a GED under the supervision of her mother. She worked for some time as a hip-hop and pole dancing instructor. Haines obtained her GED at age 16. Haines alleges that when she was 16, Arlington took her and Taylor to get fake identification cards and pushed the teens into pin-up modeling, though Arlington denies this. Haines ultimately worked as a lingerie model, appeared in the straight-to-DVD film Frat Party, and appeared nude behind a sheet in the Marilyn Manson music video for "Arma-goddamn-motherfuckin-geddon" when she was 17. At the time of the burglaries, Haines had been kicked out of her mother's and step-father's home, and was staying with "Bling Ring" co-defendant Nick Prugo and his family.

After the airing of Pretty Wild, many unapproved images were released of Haines and her costar Tess Taylor on the website TheDirty.com. Although lawyers requested that the images, which portrayed the girls smoking bongs and what appeared to be heroin, be taken down, blogger Nik Richie, the owner of the site, declined. In December 2010, Haines checked into the SOBA Recovery center in Malibu, California, after she was sentenced to one year of rehab following an arrest for possession of black tar heroin and a fake Florida identification card. Both were discovered when Haines failed to check in with her probation officer, while on probation for her involvement in the "Bling Ring", and officers paid her a visit and searched her residence. She was joined in rehab by Taylor, albeit briefly, under unrelated circumstances.

On December 8, 2011, Haines participated in an episode of Nik Richie radio on the website TheDirty.com. She admitted to being addicted to heroin, Xanax, alcohol, and OxyContin during the filming of Pretty Wild, stating that when not filming the show she was "living in a Best Western hotel", getting high and panhandling for money on the streets. She was sexually abused as a young child, which she says contributed to her drug problems, along with her troubles with her father, an incident of rape, and a boyfriend who also used. In 2011, she said she no longer speaks to Taylor, though in 2019, Taylor joined Haines on her podcast Recovering from Reality to discuss her recovery from her own heroin addiction. As of 2022, Haines said she had been sober for eleven years.

Haines got sober at nineteen years old, after facing up to six years in the California State prison system due to her addiction to heroin. Haines started school while in treatment in order to obtain her CASAC (Credentialed Alcohol and Substance Abuse Counselor) certification to become a licensed drug and alcohol counselor. Starting in 2013, Haines was a columnist for Vice, covering youth, addiction, and recovery. She appeared in a documentary for Vice, focusing on the heroin epidemic amongst youth in the Los Angeles area, and specifically, to show the human face of those in active addiction and hear their personal stories. Haines is now a counselor at Alo House Recovery Centers and hosts a podcast called Recovering from Reality. Haines has also worked as a Doula.

In April 2012, she married Evan Haines, a Canadian businessman, in Mexico. There were 20 guests, including Haines' mother, Gabby, and Tess. On April 24, 2013, Haines gave birth to their first child, a girl. She later gave birth to their second child, another girl. In 2021, Haines and her husband separated, and as of September 2022, the relationship had ended.

== Pretty Wild ==
On March 14, 2010, Pretty Wild premiered on E! network, a reality TV show based on the lives of Haines, her now estranged unofficially adopted "sister" Tess Taylor, her younger biological sister Gabby Neiers, and their mother, Andrea Arlington, a former Playboy model. The show focused on the modeling careers of Haines and Taylor, as well as their LA "party lifestyle". The show was criticized for the girls' sexual antics and the seemingly bizarre behavior of the sisters and their mother. Shortly after filming the pilot episode, Haines was arrested for her involvement in the "Bling Ring" robberies and the show ended up chronicling her arrest and eventual plea bargain and jail time. The show was not renewed for a second season.
