= Leslie Mann =

American actress and comedian (born 1972)

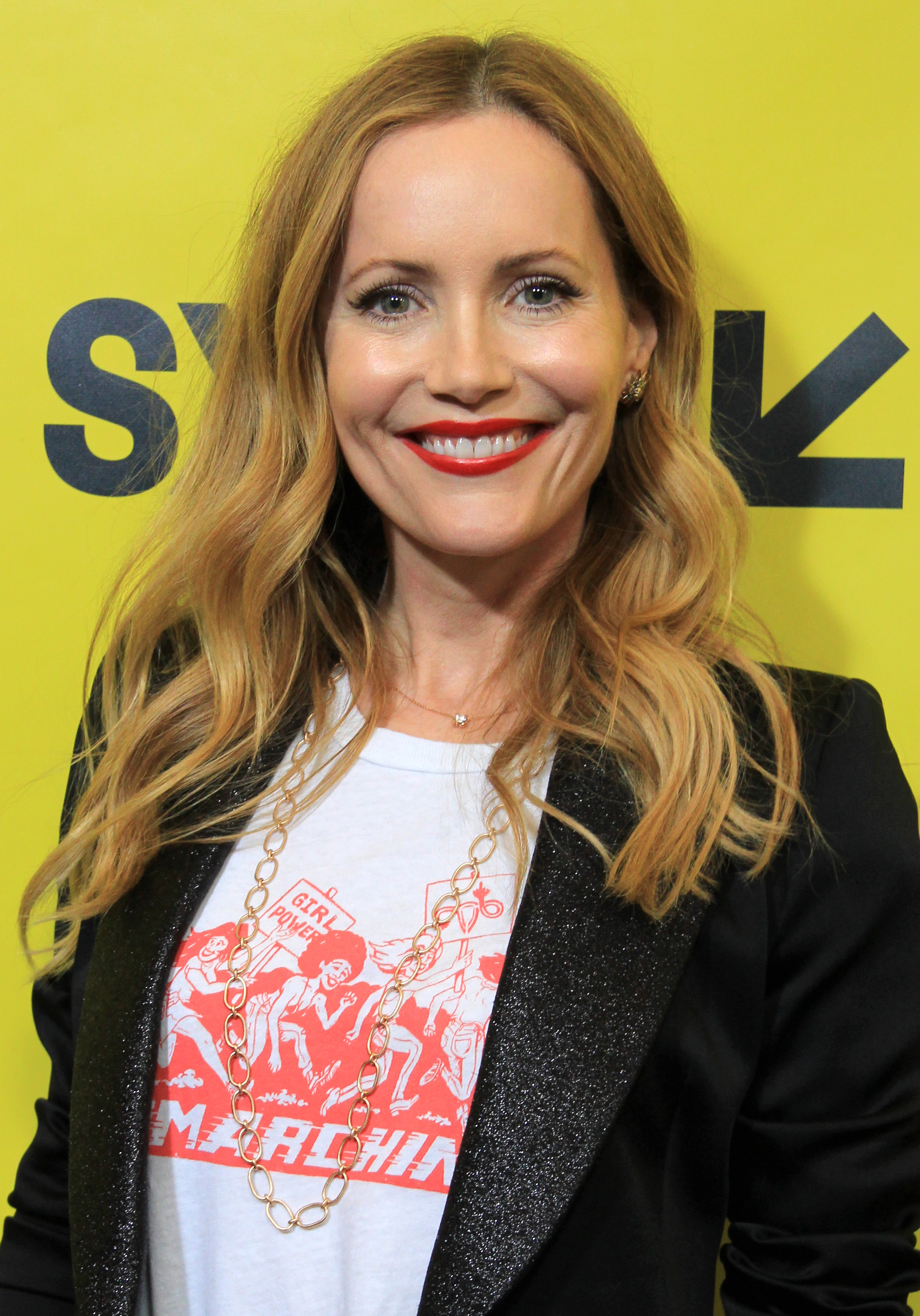
- Mann in 2018
- Born: March 26, 1972 (age 54); San Francisco, California, U.S.
- Occupations: Actress; comedian
- Years active: 1988–present
- Spouse: Judd Apatow (m. 1997)
- Children: Maude Apatow; Iris Apatow

Leslie Mann (born March 26, 1972) is an American actress and comedian. She is best known for her performances in film and television comedies, mostly collaborating with her husband, comedy director Judd Apatow.

Mann began her career in the 1980s and 1990s, garnering early attention for the films The Cable Guy (1996), She's the One (1996), George of the Jungle (1997), Big Daddy (1999), Orange County (2002), and The 40-Year-Old Virgin (2005). She earned acclaim for roles in Knocked Up (2007) and This Is 40 (2012), both directed by Apatow. Her career continued with Drillbit Taylor (2008), I Love You Phillip Morris (2009), 17 Again (2009), Funny People (2009), Rio (2011), The Change-Up (2011), The Bling Ring (2013), The Other Woman (2014), Rio 2 (2014), and Blockers (2018).

== Early life ==
Leslie Mann was born on March 26, 1972, in San Francisco, and grew up in Newport Beach. She was raised by her mother, Janet Ayres, who led design and quality programs for eight years at Ayres Hotel group. Mann has stated of her father, "My dad is...I don't really have one. I mean, he does exist, but I have zero relationship with him." She has two siblings and three older step-brothers. Her maternal grandmother, Sadie Viola Heljä Räsänen, was the daughter of Finnish immigrants.

Mann has said that she was "very shy, kind of pent-up" during her youth. She graduated from Corona del Mar High School, and studied acting at the Baron/Brown Acting Studio and alongside comedy improv troupe The Groundlings. She attended college and studied communications, but dropped out before graduating.

== Career ==
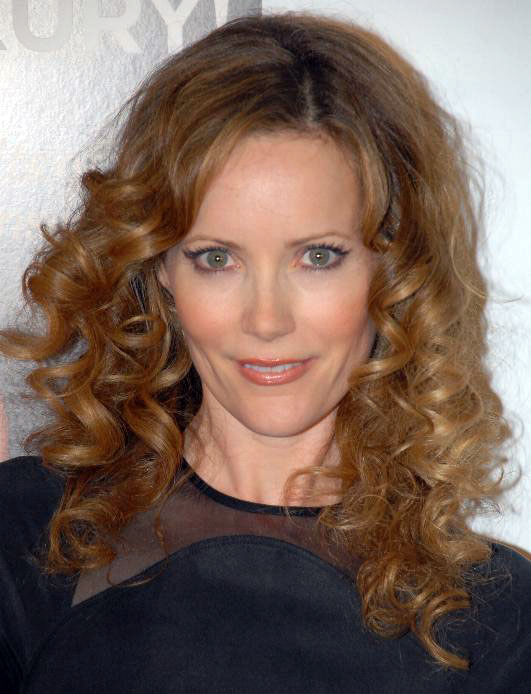
Mann in 2008

Mann began her career at 18, appearing in a number of television commercials. In 1996, she appeared in The Cable Guy, followed with performances in Freaks and Geeks, Sam Weisman's George of The Jungle alongside Brendan Fraser, Big Daddy with Adam Sandler, Orange County opposite Jack Black, and The 40-Year-Old Virgin with Steve Carell.

In 2007, Mann starred alongside Seth Rogen, Katherine Heigl, and Paul Rudd in Judd Apatow's comedy Knocked Up. Her performance brought rave reviews and a "Best Supporting Actress" nomination from the Chicago Film Critics Association. The film won the People's Choice Award for "Favorite Movie Comedy", was named one of AFI's "Top Ten Films of the Year", and received a "Best Comedy" nomination from the Broadcast Film Critics Association Awards.

In 2009, Mann reunited with her Big Daddy co-star Adam Sandler and Knocked Up co-star Seth Rogen for Apatow's Funny People. This film was named to many of the year's top ten lists, including The New Yorker and The New York Times. Elle writer Mickey Rapkin said that "[Mann] owns the second half of 2009's Funny People, where her character does the most unlikely thing a woman can do in a major studio picture: has an affair with an ex-boyfriend on a whim." That same year, Mann also starred in Burr Steers' successful comedy 17 Again opposite Zac Efron and Matthew Perry, which grossed over $136 million worldwide.

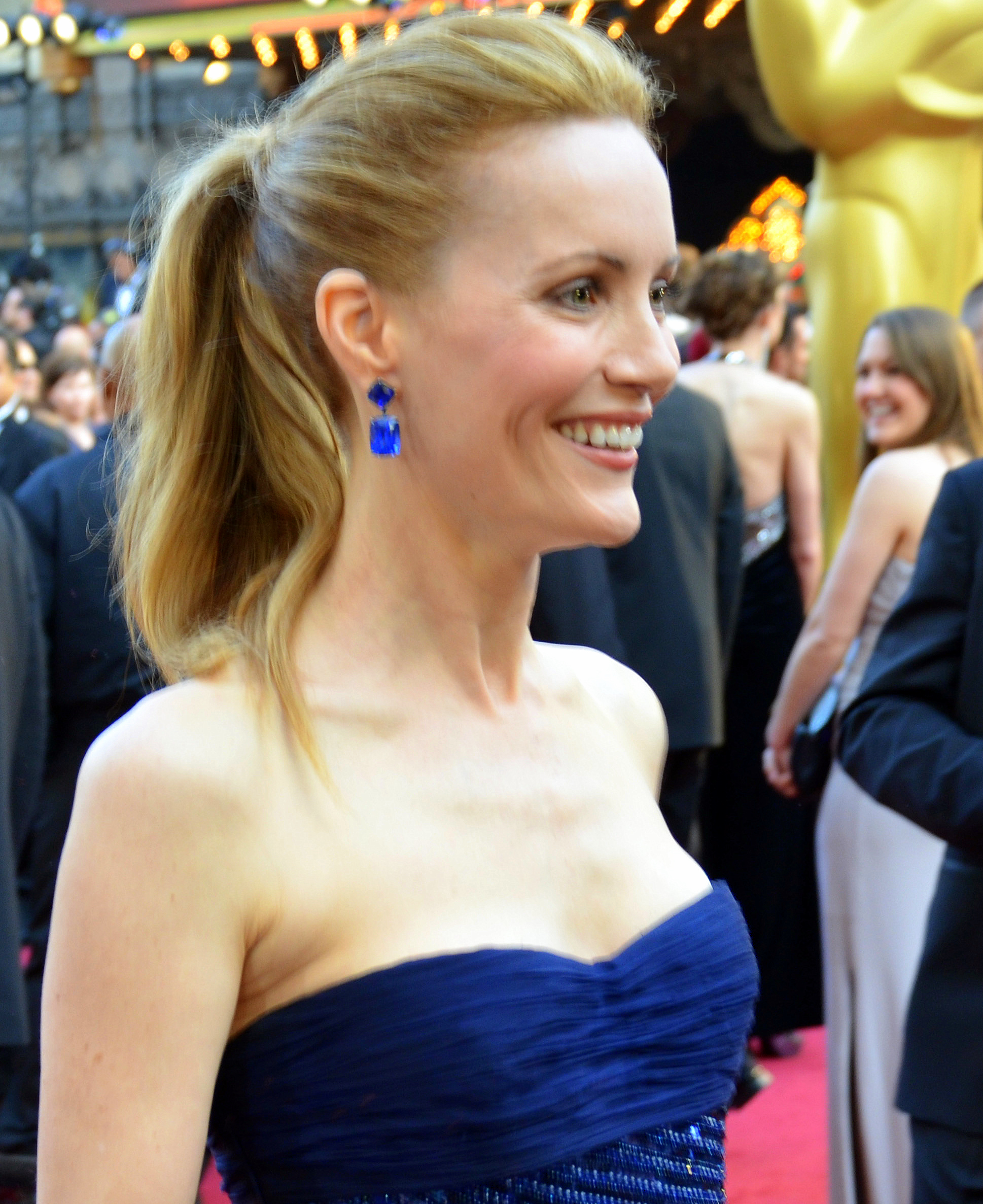
Mann at the 84th Academy Awards in February 2012

She was also seen in the indie hit I Love You Phillip Morris alongside Jim Carrey and Ewan McGregor. It premiered at the 2009 Sundance Film Festival and, on release, received critical acclaim, including a "Best Comedy" nomination for a 2011 Broadcast Film Critics Association Award. Mann also starred alongside Elizabeth Banks in the film What Was I Thinking?, based on the book by Barbara Davilman and Liz Dubelman, which was filmed in 2009 but never released.

In 2011, Mann starred opposite Ryan Reynolds and Jason Bateman in David Dobkin's comedy The Change-Up. She also lent her voice to "Linda", the main human character in Carlos Saldanha's animated film Rio, which earned over $484 million worldwide and also featured vocal performances by Jamie Foxx and Anne Hathaway; as well as to Jonah Hill's animated FOX television series Allen Gregory, as the title character's second-grade teacher.

Mann continued her voice performance work in 2012 with her role in ParaNorman, an animated 3D stop-motion film from Chris Butler and Sam Fell.

In December 2012, she appeared opposite Paul Rudd in Apatow's This Is 40, the sequel to Knocked Up. The movie reunited the trio from the first film, with Mann and Rudd reprising their characters. The sequel was written and directed by Judd Apatow, and included the couple's two daughters in the cast. In contrast to Knocked Up, This Is 40 centered squarely on Mann's character and her family. An early response to Mann's performance from Elle Magazine states that "[she] doesn't just walk off with scenes—she steals the show". Mann was nominated for Best Actress in a Comedy by the Broadcast Film Critics Association for This Is 40.

In 2013, Mann appeared in Sofia Coppola's The Bling Ring, with Emma Watson. Inspired by actual events, the film follows a group of fame-obsessed L.A. teenagers who burgled celebrity homes by tracking their whereabouts on the internet. In 2014, she narrated "Women in Comedy", an episode of Season 2 of Makers: Women Who Make America. In 2015, Mann was nominated at the MTV Movie Awards for Best Kiss with Chris Hemsworth, from the film Vacation. In 2018, she starred as a single mother in the sex comedy Blockers and reunited with Steve Carell in Welcome to Marwen.

== Personal life ==
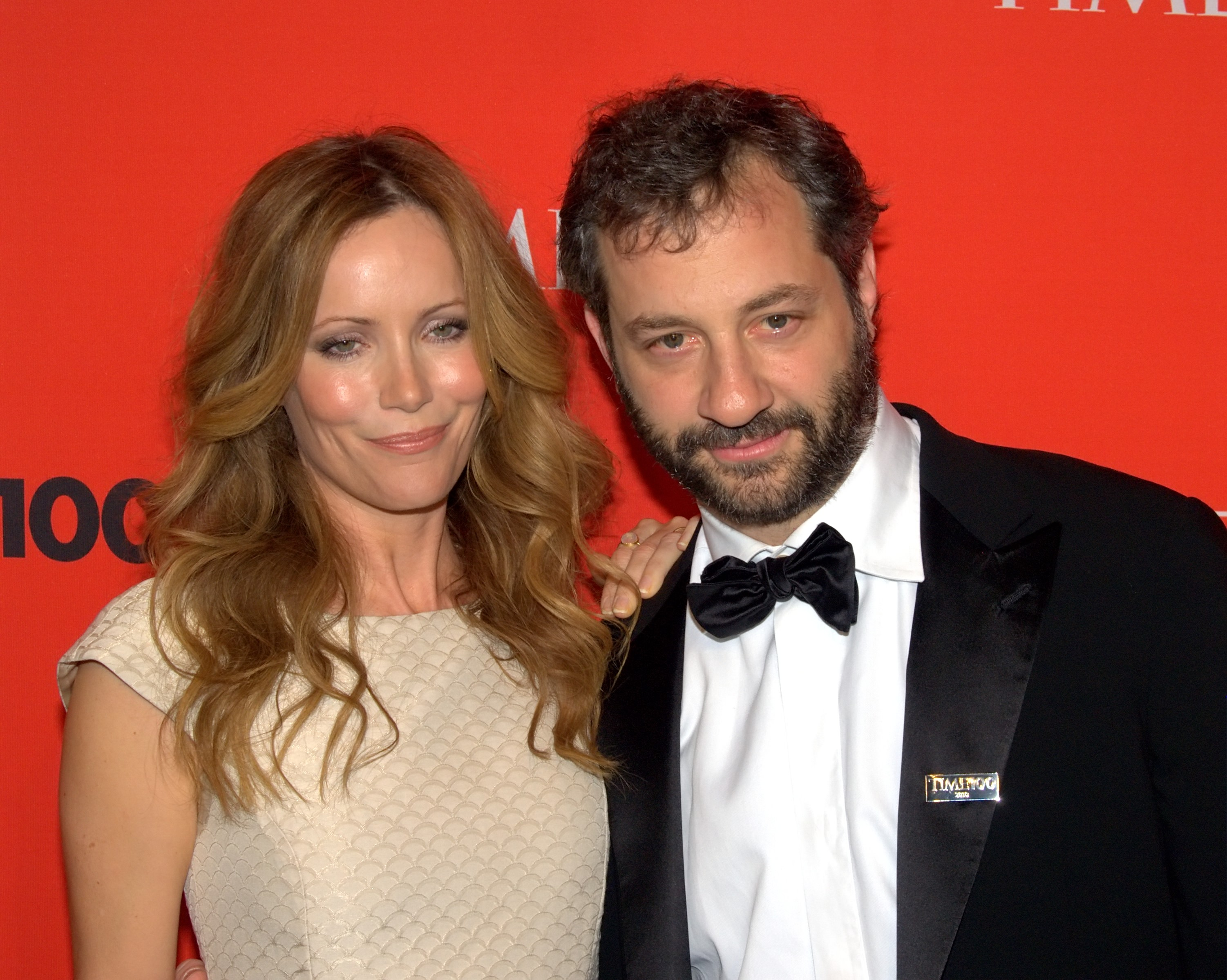
Mann with husband, Judd Apatow, in 2010

On June 9, 1997, Mann married director and producer Judd Apatow, whom she met while auditioning for The Cable Guy. Apatow, one of the film's producers, read the lines to auditioning actresses as a stand-in for Jim Carrey. Mann and Apatow have two daughters, Maude and Iris, who both appeared in the films Knocked Up, Funny People, and This Is 40 as the children of Mann's characters.

Mann and Apatow are both longtime supporters of the nonprofit organization 826LA, which focuses on encouraging and developing the writing skills of disadvantaged youth. They are also involved with the University of California, Los Angeles Rape Treatment Center's Stuart House, which serves sexually abused children and their families. Mann and Apatow's philanthropic contributions were honored in 2012 by the Bogart Pediatric Cancer Research Program, which awarded them the 2012 "Children's Choice Award" for their work with children and families dealing with pediatric cancer. In 2009, they were also recognized by The Fulfillment Fund, which honored them at its annual benefit gala. Mann is Catholic.

== Filmography ==
=== Film ===
List of film appearances, with year, title, and role shown
| | Title | Role | Notes |
|---|---|---|---|
| 1991 | Virgin High | Extra | |
| 1996 | Bottle Rocket | Sorority Girl | Deleted scene |
| 1996 | Cosas que nunca te dije | Laurie | |
| 1996 | She's the One | Connie | |
| 1996 | Last Man Standing | Wanda | |
| 1996 | The Cable Guy | Robin Harris | |
| 1997 | George of the Jungle | Ursula Stanhope | |
| 1999 | Big Daddy | Corinne Maloney | |
| 2000 | Timecode | Cherine | |
| 2001 | Perfume | Camille | |
| 2002 | Orange County | Krista Brumder | |
| 2002 | Stealing Harvard | Elaine Warner | |
| 2005 | The 40-Year-Old Virgin | Nicky | |
| 2007 | Knocked Up | Debbie | |
| 2008 | Drillbit Taylor | Lisa Zachey | |
| 2008 | Beverly Hills Chihuahua | Bimini | Voice role, Uncredited |
| 2009 | 17 Again | Scarlett O'Donnell | |
| 2009 | Funny People | Laura | |
| 2009 | Shorts | Mom Thompson | |
| 2009 | I Love You Phillip Morris | Debbie Russell | |
| 2011 | Rio | Linda Gunderson | Voice role |
| 2011 | Little Birds | Margaret Hobart | |
| 2011 | The Change-Up | Jamie Lockwood | |
| 2012 | ParaNorman | Sandra Babcock | Voice role |
| 2012 | This Is 40 | Debbie | |
| 2013 | The Bling Ring | Laurie Moore | |
| 2014 | Mr. Peabody & Sherman | Patty Peterson | Voice role |
| 2014 | Rio 2 | Linda Gunderson | Voice role |
| 2014 | The Other Woman | Kate King | |
| 2015 | Vacation | Audrey Griswold-Crandall | |
| 2016 | How to Be Single | Meg Kepley | |
| 2016 | The Comedian | Harmony Schiltz | |
| 2018 | Blockers | Lisa Decker | |
| 2018 | Welcome to Marwen | Nicol | |
| 2019 | Motherless Brooklyn | Julia Minna | |
| 2020 | Blithe Spirit | Elvira Condomine | |
| 2020 | The Croods: A New Age | Hope Betterman | Voice role |
| 2022 | Cha Cha Real Smooth | Lisa | |
| 2022 | The Bubble | Lauren Van Chance | |
| 2025 | Poetic License | Liz Cassidy | |
| 2026 | Spa Weekend | Jane | |

=== Television ===
List of film appearances, with year, title, and role shown
| Year | Title | Role | Notes |
|---|---|---|---|
| 1994 | Birdland | Nurse Mary | Episode: "Grand Delusion" |
| 1995 | The Wright Verdicts | Erica Mercer | Episode: "Pilot" |
| 1998 | Hercules | Amphitrite | Voice role; 2 episodes |
| 1999 | Freaks and Geeks | Ms. Foote | Episode: "Chokin and Tokin" |
| 2011 | Modern Family | Katie | Episode: "Treehouse" |
| 2011 | Allen Gregory | Gina Winthrop | Voice role; 7 episodes |
| 2014 | The Simpsons | Herself | Voice role; Episode: "Steal This Episode" |
| 2014 | Makers: Women Who Make America | Narrator | Episode: "Women in Comedy" |

== Awards and nominations ==
| Year | Award | Category | Nominated work | Result |
|---|---|---|---|---|
| 2007 | Chicago Film Critics Association Awards | Best Supporting Actress | Knocked Up | Nominated |
| 2013 | Critics' Choice Movie Awards | Best Actress in a Comedy | This Is 40 | Nominated |
| 2014 | Teen Choice Awards | Choice Movie Chemistry (shared with Cameron Diaz and Kate Upton) | The Other Woman | Nominated |
| 2016 | MTV Movie & TV Awards | Best Kiss (shared with Chris Hemsworth) | Vacation | Nominated |
