= Forgetting Sarah Marshall =

2008 film by Nicholas Stoller

- Theatrical release poster
- Directed by: Nicholas Stoller
- Written by: Jason Segel
- Produced by: Judd Apatow; Shauna Robertson; Rodney Rothman
- Starring: Jason Segel; Kristen Bell; Mila Kunis; Russell Brand
- Cinematography: Russ T. Alsobrook
- Edited by: William Kerr
- Music by: Lyle Workman
- Production company: Apatow Productions
- Distributed by: Universal Pictures
- Release date: April 18, 2008
- Running time: 111 minutes
- Country: United States
- Language: English
- Budget: $30 million
- Box office: $105.8 million

Forgetting Sarah Marshall is a 2008 American romantic comedy film directed by Nicholas Stoller in his feature directorial debut. It was produced by Judd Apatow and written by Jason Segel, who stars as a music composer who goes on vacation to Hawaii to move forward from a painful break-up. However, trouble ensues when he runs into his ex (Kristen Bell) and her new boyfriend (Russell Brand) there. Mila Kunis also stars, as Segel's new love interest.

Filming began in April 2007 at the Turtle Bay Resort on the North Shore of Oahu Island in Hawaii. When Universal Pictures released Forgetting Sarah Marshall in North American theaters on April 18, 2008, it received critical acclaim and was a box-office hit, grossing $105 million on a $30 million production budget.

== Plot ==
Composer Peter Bretter is devastated when his girlfriend of five years, television actress Sarah Marshall, dumps him out of the blue. To get over her, he decides to take a trip to Oahu, Hawaii, a place Sarah used to talk about a lot. However, Peter's hopes for a relaxing getaway are ruined when he learns that Sarah and her new boyfriend, British rock star Aldous Snow, are staying at the same resort. Rachel Jansen, a hotel concierge, takes pity on Peter and offers him a complimentary suite.

Peter's heartbreak is aggravated by awkward run-ins with Sarah and Aldous, and by the sight of vacationing couples at the resort. Things improve when he begins spending time with Rachel and developing feelings for her. While hanging out one night, Peter confesses to Rachel that he hates his day job of composing music for television shows and that his true passion is writing a Dracula puppet rock opera. At a bar, Rachel volunteers Peter to perform a song from the opera and cheers him on as he performs the number. On a hike one day, Rachel dares Peter to jump off a cliff into the ocean. He starts to jump but gets caught in some vines, and is left dangling off the edge. After Rachel prods him to let go, he lands safely in the water, and she kisses him.

Meanwhile, the relationship between Sarah and Aldous is showing signs of trouble. This is exacerbated by the news that Sarah's newest television show has been canceled and that Aldous is about to embark on an 18-month world tour with his band. At the same time, Peter's room is needed by new occupants, so he is placed in the suite next to Sarah's. When Aldous and Peter run into each other while surfing one day, Aldous lets slip that he and Sarah began having sex a full year before she broke up with Peter. When Peter confronts Sarah about this, she reveals she felt emotionally disconnected from him, and that she could no longer save their relationship.

Sarah becomes aware of the budding romance between Peter and Rachel and starts to feel jealous, while Peter realizes that his former relationship with Sarah was not as good as he thought it was. The two couples share an awkward, drunken dinner. Afterwards, Peter takes Rachel back to his room and they begin to have sex. Hearing them through the wall, Sarah tries to compete with them by initiating sex with Aldous and moaning loudly. When Aldous realizes Sarah is trying to provoke a reaction from Peter, he pushes her off and tells her she is not over her ex. They bicker furiously, prompting Aldous to end their relationship.

The next day, Peter learns Aldous has broken up with Sarah and is flying back to England. Peter goes to Sarah's room to console her, when Sarah admits she still loves him and wants to reconcile. They begin to have sex, but Peter abruptly ends it because of his feelings for Rachel. Peter immediately goes to Rachel to confess what happened, but she is hurt and demands that he leave and never contact her again. Before leaving, he goes to the bar they visited and removes a topless photo of her that was hung in the restroom's collage without her consent. Peter returns the photo to Rachel, bruised from a beating by the bar owner.

Peter flies back to Los Angeles and, after a period of sadness and self-loathing, begins working on his Dracula puppet opera. He invites Rachel to the opening night. Although extremely hesitant at first, Rachel eventually decides to attend. After the successful performance, she congratulates Peter and tells him she is looking into staying in the area. She leaves so Peter can bask in the success of his show, but quickly returns to Peter's dressing room to tell him she misses him. They embrace and kiss.

== Cast ==
- Jason Segel as Peter Bretter, a composer for TV shows
- Kristen Bell as Sarah Marshall, a famous TV actress
- Mila Kunis as Rachel Jansen, a desk clerk for a Hawaiian resort
- Russell Brand as Aldous Snow, a British rock star and Sarah's new boyfriend
- Bill Hader as Brian Bretter, Peter's stepbrother and best friend
- Jack McBrayer as Darald Braden, a guest at the resort and newlywed
- Maria Thayer as Wyoma Braden, Darald's wife
- Jonah Hill as Matthew Van Der Wyk, a waiter at Turtle Bay and obsessive fan of Aldous
- Liz Cackowski as Liz Bretter, Brian's wife
- Da'Vone McDonald as Dwayne, a bartender at the resort
- Paul Rudd as Chuck / Kunu, an air-headed surfing instructor
- Jason Bateman as Animal Instincts Detective, a character on Sarah Marshall's latest show
- William Baldwin as Himself / Det. Hunter Rush, a co-star on Sarah's show
- Teila Tuli as Kimo, a cook at the resort
- Branscombe Richmond as Keoki, a resort bartender

In extended versions of the film, Kristen Wiig appears as Prana, a yoga instructor.

=== Puppeteers ===
The puppets in the film were created by Jim Henson's Creature Shop.

The following animate the puppets in this film:

- Carol Binion
- Tim Blaney
- Julianne Buescher – Angel
- Kevin Carlson
- Leslie Carrara-Rudolph – One of Dracula's Brides
- BJ Guyer
- Sean Johnson – Five Dancing Mummies
- Scott Land
- Drew Massey – Right Hand of Count Dracula
- Michael Oosterom
- Michelan Sisti
- Victor Yerrid – Right Hand of Van Helsing

== Production ==
Judd Apatow was very involved in the casting process and the development of the script. Regarding the nudity in the film, director Nicholas Stoller added that the first draft of the script called for Peter to get dressed after the breakup, but Apatow thought it would be funnier if the character stayed naked the entire time. Stoller confirmed the topless picture of Mila Kunis used in the film was created on a computer and not real.

=== Filming ===
Filming was completed in Hawaii and Los Angeles. Filming in Oahu was done over 33 days. Other filming locations included Laie Point (the cliff jumping scene), Mokuleia Beach, and Keawa'ula Bay. The interior of Lazy Joe's bar was actually the bar Le Barcito in Silver Lake.

While filming, lead actor Jason Segel told a New York Times interviewer that the naked breakup scenes were based on a real-life experience he had. The film features a great deal of improvised dialogue; according to Stoller, it's "60 or 70 percent scripted and then 30 or 40 percent improv".

Lead actress Mila Kunis had an on-set injury while recording a scene on a jet ski, in which the handlebar attached to the watercraft ripped a piece of her neck off resulting in a permanent scar. Kunis, after filming, was in discussions to star in the 2009 comedy film Miss March to which directors Zach Cregger and Trevor Moore credit an awkward discussion surrounding said on-set injury as the result of her not getting cast into their film.

According to the Netflix documentary Russell Brand: Open Secret, Russell Brand's former girlfriend Jordan Martin recounted experiences during the film's production, during which she accompanied Brand on set. Martin stated that Brand invited her to the film's location to keep him from pursuing women on set, but alleged that he subjected her to coercive and controlling behavior during the film's production. According to Martin, Brand forbade her from sunbathing, criticized her clothing, demanded she wear only black, and forced her to brush her teeth until her gums bled so she would taste "anonymous." She also alleged that he engaged in a sexual encounter with a yoga instructor during the film's shoot and falsely accused her of infidelity with a crew member.

== Music ==
Segel and Lyle Workman wrote music for the film, which includes music by Infant Sorrow and a song from the Dracula musical. Songs by Eric Carmen, Blondie, and Kenny Loggins were also used in previews for the film.

=== Soundtrack ===
Forgetting Sarah Marshall: Original Soundtrack

Soundtrack album by Various Artists
- Released: April 22, 2008
- Genre: Soundtrack
- Label: Verve Forecast/Capitol

The soundtrack of Forgetting Sarah Marshall was released on April 22, 2008.

No.	Title	Length
1.	"Love You Madly" (Cake)	3:58
2.	"We've Got to Do Something" (Infant Sorrow)	3:33
3.	"You Can't Break a Heart and Have It" (Black Francis)	2:37
4.	"Get Me Away From Here, I'm Dying" (Belle & Sebastian)	3:25
5.	"More Than Words" (Aloha Sex Juice)	3:12
6.	"Dracula's Lament" (Jason Segel)	1:23
7.	"Inside of You" (Infant Sorrow)	2:50
8.	"Fucking Boyfriend" (The Bird and the Bee)	3:14
9.	"Intensified '68 (Music Like Dirt)" (Desmond Dekker)	2:43
10.	"Nothing Compares 2 U" (The Coconutz, a cover version translated into Hawaiian)	5:58
11.	"Baby" (Os Mutantes)	3:37
12.	"These Boots Are Made for Walkin'" (The Coconutz)	2:52
13.	"A Taste for Love" (Forgetting Sarah Marshall Cast)	2:04
14.	"The Secret Sun" (Jesse Harris)	3:45
15.	"Everybody Hurts" (The Coconutz)	6:03
16.	"Animal Instincts" (The Transcenders featuring J7 D'Star)	1:14

Several songs are featured in the film that were not included on the soundtrack, including "Heaven Knows I'm Miserable Now" by The Smiths and the version of "Nothing Compares 2 U" by Sinéad O'Connor, both of which are heard in the background during the scene in which Peter's brother deletes all of Peter's photos. "Amber" by 311 can be heard in the background during the bar scene after Peter and Rachel's first date, as well as "Playa Azul" from Los Amigos Invisibles. "Move Your Feet" by Junior Senior is briefly played in the background in the scene at the beginning when they are showing Access Hollywood clips. Another song not featured on the soundtrack is "Heavy Lifting" from New York band Ambulance Ltd.

== Release ==
The film was promoted with a "teaser" billboard campaign, featuring the text "I hate Sarah Marshall" and the address of the film's website. Promotion also included a mock website for a Sarah Marshall fan page and a mock website from NBC of Sarah Marshall's fictional TV show Crime Scene: Scene of the Crime.

Jason Segel thought it would be funny to not disclose his full frontal nudity scene to his parents prior to the movie premier. His mother did not appreciate the joke and had to step out of the theater. She later emailed the family to warn them of the nudity.

In its opening weekend, the film grossed $17.7 million in 2,798 theaters in the United States and Canada, ranking No. 2 at the box office behind The Forbidden Kingdom, and averaging $6,335 per theater in the US and per theater in Canada. It opened behind other Apatow productions such as Superbad, Knocked Up, The 40-Year-Old Virgin and Talladega Nights, but ahead of contemporary Apatow films Walk Hard and Drillbit Taylor.

Forgetting Sarah Marshall grossed $105.8 million worldwide; $63.2 million in North America and $42.6 million in other territories.

=== Home media ===
The DVD and Blu-ray editions were released on September 30, 2008. At the DVD sales chart, Forgetting Sarah Marshall opened at #2 and sold 652,000 units, translating to $12,905,492 in revenue. As of (November 2009) 1,785,744 DVD units have been sold, acquiring revenue of $29,145,295. This does not include Blu-ray sales/DVD rentals.

It was released in a single-disc DVD edition, a three-disc collector's DVD edition, a two-disc Blu-ray edition, and the Ultimate Unrated Comedy Collection containing the collectors' editions of Forgetting Sarah Marshall, The 40-Year-Old Virgin, and Knocked Up on either DVD or Blu-ray Disc. It was released on DVD in Australia (region 4) on August 20, 2008, in a single and 2-Disc Unforgettable Edition and was also released on Blu-ray in Australia on November 5, 2008.

== Reception ==
Review aggregator Rotten Tomatoes reports that 84% of 184 critics have given the film a positive review, with a rating average of 7/10. The site's critics consensus reads, "With ample laughs and sharp performances, Forgetting Sarah Marshall finds just the right mix of romantic and raunchy comedy." Metacritic assigned the film a weighted average score of 67 out of 100 based on 37 critics, indicating "generally favorable" reviews. Audiences surveyed by CinemaScore gave the film an average grade of "B" on an A+ to F scale.

Matt Pais of the Chicago Tribune said it's "the kind of movie you could watch all day because, like a new flame, you can't get enough of its company and are just glad to see where it takes you." Michael Phillips, also of the Tribune, wrote "this story of one man's rebound has a heart to go with its comic nerve", and "Segel (star of the TV series 'How I Met Your Mother') has what Nicolas Cage and Gene Wilder and a precious handful of other witty actors have: the ability to make egregious humiliation and painful neediness a source of limitless mirth". Richard Roeper praised the film for its laugh-out-loud moments as well as its worthiness to be an instant classic and went as far as to say he would put it on his list of 50 favorite comedies of all time.

Other positive reviews come from Entertainment Weekly who gave the film a B+ and applauded "Jason Segel's riff on varieties of male bewilderment," and Mick LaSalle of the San Francisco Chronicle, who wrote "Segel's breakthrough movie, Forgetting Sarah Marshall, deserves to ride the wave of the latest, hottest micro-trend in pictures: the romantic comedy for guys."

== Awards and nominations ==
Forgetting Sarah Marshall was nominated for five awards at the 2008 Teen Choice Awards, but did not win any of them. The nominations were:

- Movie, Bromantic Comedy
- Movie, Actress Comedy: Kristen Bell
- Movie, Breakout Female: Kristen Bell
- Movie, Breakout Female: Mila Kunis
- Movie, Breakout Male: Jason Segel

On The Comedy Festival Presents: Funniest Movies of the Year 2008 special on TBS, Forgetting Sarah Marshall was voted The Funniest Film of 2008.

== Follow-up spin-off ==
Get Him to the Greek is the spin-off/follow-up to Forgetting Sarah Marshall. The film was released on June 4, 2010, reuniting director Nicholas Stoller and producer Judd Apatow with stars Russell Brand and Jonah Hill. Brand reprises his role of Aldous Snow, while Hill plays an entirely new character. Bell also briefly reprises her role as Sarah Marshall, appearing in a promotion for NBC drama Blind Medicine where she portrays a visually impaired surgeon.

This film directly inspired the 2011 film The Muppets, again bringing together Jason Segel and Nicholas Stroller. Segel, a lifelong Jim Henson fan, inserted multiple Muppets references into Forgetting Sarah Marshall.
