= Bart's New Friend =

- The Simpsons episode
- Homer, who has been hypnotized to believe that he is 10 years old, bonds with Bart through a prank call.
- Episode no.: Season 26; Episode 11
- Directed by: Bob Anderson
- Written by: Judd Apatow
- Production code: TABF05
- Original air date: January 11, 2015

Guest appearance
- Stacy Keach as Don Bookner

Episode features
- Chalkboard gag: "Snowmen don't have carrot penises"
- Couch gag: In an updated version of Goldilocks and the Three Bears, Homer, Marge and Bart are shown walking into their home. They find out that someone has been eating their porridge and broke their couches but they catch Lisa who is sleeping on Bart's couch. She wakes up to find the three of them surrounding her, causing a fight between them that ends with the Simpsons eating parts of Homer's body. The scene is revealed to be a story Homer told to a traumatized Maggie.

Episode chronology
← Previous "The Man Who Came to Be Dinner"	Next → "The Musk Who Fell to Earth"
- The Simpsons season 26

"Bart's New Friend" is the eleventh episode of the twenty-sixth season of the American animated television series The Simpsons, and the 563rd episode of the series. The episode was directed by Bob Anderson and written by Judd Apatow. It originally aired on the Fox network in the United States on January 11, 2015.

The episode focuses on Bart's new friendship with his father Homer, who has been hypnotized in order to think he is a young boy. The episode received mixed reviews.

== Plot ==
Homer learns that the retiring co-safety inspector of Sector 7G Don Bookner has been covering for him for years, which means Homer will actually have to work to keep his job. As he is put under pressure and is unable to take a break, Marge suggests taking the family to a circus. Here, Homer still cannot have fun and even punches a clown who attempts to trick him. Bart suggests that they could see hypnotist Sven Golly. Golly makes Homer believe that he is 10 years old again before evading Chief Wiggum when it is revealed that Golly is a criminal. At the hospital, Dr. Hibbert explains that the only way to bring Homer back is to contact Golly again; or else risk permanent damage to his psyche.

This forces Bart to share his room with Homer, and he is surprised when the new Homer says that when he will grow up, he will not have a job or a family. Bart makes Homer his new best friend and accomplice, to Milhouse's dismay. On the other side, Marge takes up knitting as she begins to miss her husband, despite their children having fun with him: Lisa holds a concert with him and Bart evades bullies due to Homer's protection. Wiggum finally manages to capture Golly and plans to bring him back, but he and Marge discover that Homer and Bart have left the house and run off to Itchy & Scratchy Land for one more day together.

Homer is finally caught and torn between his love for Marge and his new bond with Bart. He chooses the former and says goodbye to his best friend, advising him to be 10 years old forever. Before reversing the hypnotism, Marge asks Golly to make Homer more affectionate; as he refuses to cuddle after sex. Golly then brings Homer back to his old self, but before Marge can explain what happened, Homer assumes that the reason of his presence at Itchy & Scratchy Land was because he was drunk and asks for forgiveness, which Marge gives. Later that night, Homer visits Bart in his room and confides to Bart that he had a special friend as a kid but cannot remember who it is. He also decides not to strangle him again and rather wants to begin a new step with him. Later, after having sex, Homer impulsively offers to cuddle Marge, who then becomes thankful for Golly's help.

Later, in a specially made cell, Golly manages to hypnotize Wiggum into thinking he is the actual prisoner, and leaves Wiggum locked in the cell before being visited by Loki.

== Production ==
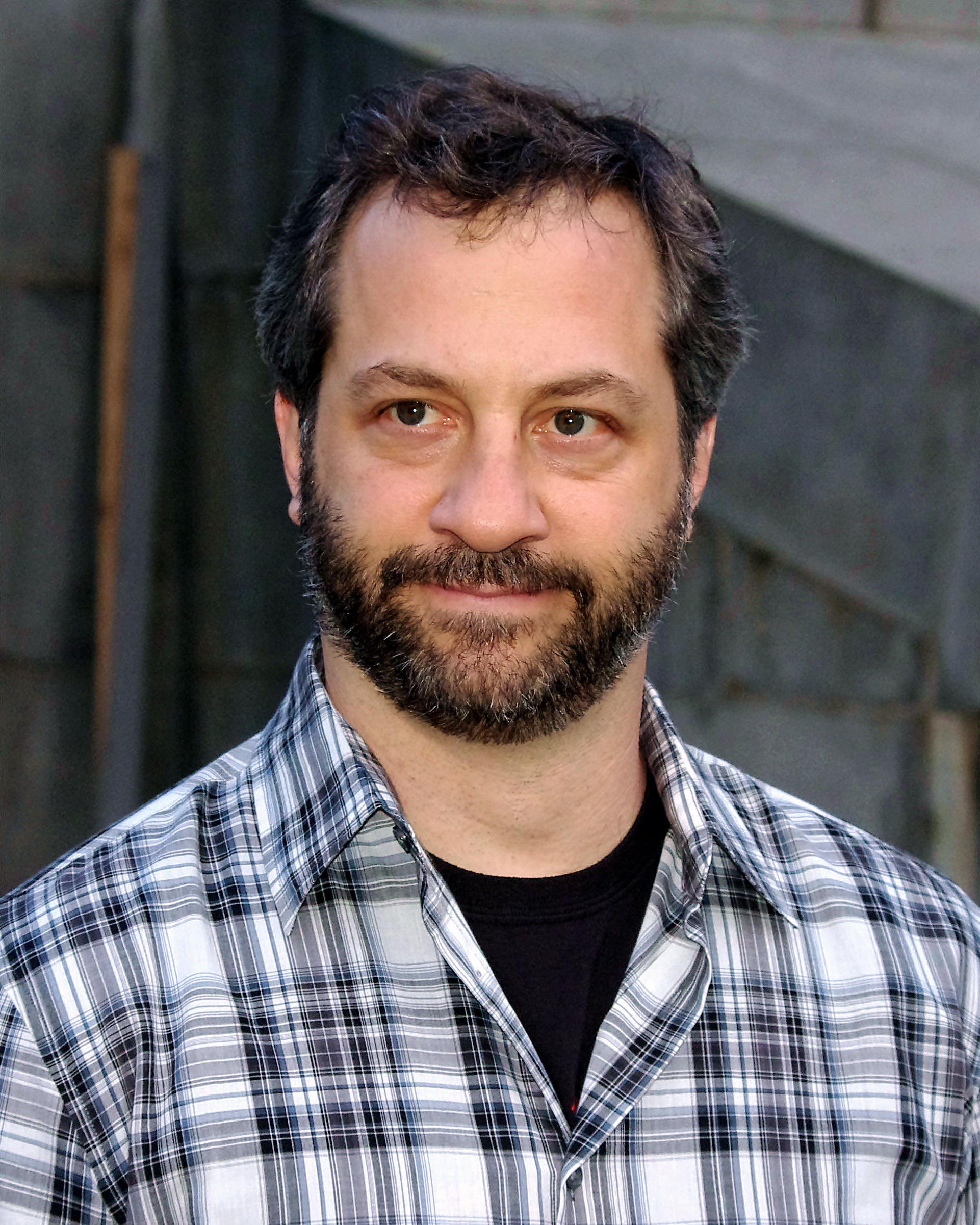
Judd Apatow wrote the episode, basing it on a spec script he had written in 1990

"Bart's New Friend" was written by Judd Apatow, better known for films such as Bridesmaids and The 40-Year-Old Virgin. The episode originated as a spec script Apatow had written when he was 22-years-old, in the style of the first episodes of the series. In an interview with TVGuide, Apatow explained that "I also wrote a spec script for the great Chris Elliott show Get a Life. They at least brought me in for a meeting, but that didn't lead to any work, either. Then, all these years later, Al Jean calls and says, 'Hey, we'll make it now!'"

== Cultural references ==
The episode has a scene in remembrance of the victims of the January 7 shootings at the offices of Charlie Hebdo in Paris with a cutscene of Maggie, whose posture resembles Eugène Delacroix's painting Liberty Leading the People, holding a flag reading Je Suis Charlie. During the theatre scene, silhouettes of Crow and Tom Servo from Mystery Science Theater 3000 are seen in the bottom right of the screen.

== Reception ==
The episode received an audience of 4.28 million, making it the most watched show on Fox that night. It was the third most watched show in its timeslot, led by coverage of the Golden Globe Awards on NBC.

Dennis Perkins of The A.V. Club gave the episode a B, saying "I reject the idea that The Simpsons is out of stories, because there is no end to the stories to be spun out of the relationships and conflicts of the family unit."

Writing for IGN, Jesse Schedeen concluded that while it was a "perfectly decent new chapter of the show", the episode felt typical of the current season instead of resembling the older episodes Apatow had been watching when he first wrote it. He gave it a score of 6.8 out of 10.

Dan Castellaneta's role in the episode as Homer was nominated for the Award for Outstanding Character Voice-Over Performance at the 67th Primetime Emmy Awards, one of three Simpsons actors to be nominated.
