= Pineapple Express (film) =

2008 film by David Gordon Green

- Theatrical release poster
- Directed by: David Gordon Green
- Screenplay by: Seth Rogen; Evan Goldberg
- Story by: Judd Apatow; Seth Rogen; Evan Goldberg
- Produced by: Judd Apatow; Shauna Robertson
- Starring: Seth Rogen; James Franco; Gary Cole; Rosie Perez; Danny McBride
- Cinematography: Tim Orr
- Edited by: Craig Alpert
- Music by: Graeme Revell
- Production companies: Columbia Pictures; Relativity Media; The Apatow Company
- Distributed by: Sony Pictures Releasing
- Release date: August 8, 2008
- Running time: 112 minutes
- Country: United States
- Language: English
- Budget: $26 million
- Box office: $102.4 million

Pineapple Express is a 2008 American stoner action comedy film directed by David Gordon Green from a screenplay written by Seth Rogen and Evan Goldberg. Starring Rogen, James Franco, Gary Cole, Rosie Perez and Danny McBride, the film centers on a process server (played Rogen) and his marijuana dealer (played by Franco), who attempt to escape from hitmen and a corrupt police officer (played by Perez) after witnessing them commit a murder. Producer Judd Apatow co-wrote the story with Rogen and Goldberg after previously collaborating on the 2007 films Knocked Up and Superbad.

Pineapple Express was released by Sony Pictures Releasing via its Columbia Pictures label on August 8, 2008. The film was a critical and commercial success, grossing $102.4 million worldwide on a $26 million budget and has since developed a cult following. For his performance in the film, Franco was nominated for a Golden Globe Award for Best Actor in a Motion Picture — Musical or Comedy.

== Plot ==
Process server and marijuana enthusiast Dale Denton visits his drug dealer Saul Silver, with whom Dale smokes the rare Pineapple Express strain before resuming work. Arriving at the home of local drug lord Ted Jones, Dale witnesses Ted and corrupt police officer Carol Brazier shoot a rival Korean gangster dead. While fleeing the scene, Dale causes a commotion and throws his roach containing Pineapple Express. Ted identifies the strain and sends his henchmen Budlofsky and Matheson to a drug dealer named Red, who tells them about Saul.

At Saul's apartment, Dale worries that Ted could trace the roach as only Red and Saul have the Pineapple Express strain, before Dale and Saul decide they must flee the city. After attempting to hide in the woods where Dale's car battery dies, Dale and Saul visit Red, who reveals that Ted knows who they are and intends to kill them. Budlofsky and Matheson torture Red for information and both shoot him in the abdomen. Believing Dale's high-schooler girlfriend Angie to be in danger, he and Saul head to her home where they are forced out at gunpoint by her father. Budlofsky and Matheson arrive at the house, but Dale and Saul depart before they can be captured and Angie's family goes to a motel.

Dale and Saul sell Pineapple Express to high school students to raise bus fare, but Dale is arrested by police officer Bobbra, who believes Dale's story about Officer Braizer and Ted murdering a man and says she will investigate. Thinking he is rescuing Dale, Saul hijacks the police car before Braizer, having heard of Dale's arrest on the police radio, pursues the duo in a high-speed chase that ends with the duo escaping her. After Dale and Saul argue and split up, Saul is kidnapped and held in Ted's lair. Dale breaks up with Angie over the phone after she talks about marriage, before enlisting an injured Red to help rescue Saul. However, Red backs out at the last minute and Dale is captured. While waiting to be killed, Dale and Saul reconcile their friendship and plan an escape.

The Korean drug gang attacks Ted's lair. After Dale and Saul free themselves before getting caught by Matheson, a brawl and shootout ensues, during which Matheson kills Budlofsky for refusing to kill Saul. Red drives his car through the barn, which kills Matheson and saves Saul before Brazier shoots Red. A Korean gangster sets off a bomb, killing Ted and setting fire to the barn while Red's car explodes and lands on Brazier, killing her. Dale carries Saul from the burning lair and a severely-wounded Red escapes and reconciles with them. The next morning, Dale, Saul and Red talk about their adventure over breakfast at a diner before Saul's grandmother picks them up and takes them to the hospital.

== Cast ==
- Seth Rogen as Dale Denton, a lazy process server and recreational marijuana smoker.
- James Franco as Saul Silver, a laid-back, friendly, airheaded drug dealer. He enjoys Dale's company and sees him as his best friend, though Dale doesn't feel the same.
- Danny McBride as Red, Saul's hotheaded, slightly insane supplier who will do or say anything to save his skin.
- Gary Cole as Ted Jones, a ruthless, unhinged drug lord, who murders a member of a rival gang.
- Kevin Corrigan as Budlofsky, one of Jones' hitmen, who constantly worries about returning home for dinner with his wife.
- Craig Robinson as Matheson, Budlofsky's bumbling, slightly sympathetic partner.
- Rosie Perez as Sgt. Carol Brazier, a corrupt Latin-American police officer, who assists Jones in the murder.
- Ken Jeong as Ken, the leader of the Korean gang.
- Amber Heard as Angie Anderson, Dale's 18-year-old girlfriend, who is still in high school.
- Ed Begley Jr. and Nora Dunn as Robert and Shannon Anderson, Angie's strict parents, who take an instant dislike to Dale and Saul.
- Joe Lo Truglio as Mr. Edwards, Angie's teacher.
- Cleo King as Police Liaison Officer Bobbra, a cop who is secretly suspicious of Brazier.
- Bill Hader as Private Miller, an American soldier who, in the opening flashback scene, smokes marijuana, while at the same time, revealing what he hates about the Army.
- James Remar as General Bratt, the soldier in charge of "Item 9" (marijuana), who, after hearing Private Miller's tirade, declares marijuana illegal.
- David McDivitt as Cop with Mole
- Troy Gentile as Troy Jones, Ted's son
- Connie Sawyer as Faye Belogus
- Arthur Napiontek as Clark
- Dana Lee as Cheung, the boss of the Korean gang and Ted's rival.
- Bobby Lee as Bobby, Ken's brother
- Justin Long as Justin

== Production ==
=== Development ===
According to producer and story co-writer Judd Apatow, the inspiration for Pineapple Express was Brad Pitt's character in the 1993 film True Romance, a stoner named Floyd. According to Apatow, he thought "it would be funny to make a movie in which you follow that character out of his apartment and watch him get chased by bad guys". According to Seth Rogen, the ideal production budget was $40 million, but due to the subject matter — "because it's a weed movie", as he described it — Sony Pictures allotted $25 million. The film inspired the name for a real cannabis strain called Pineapple Express.

David Gordon Green met with Apatow, Rogen and Evan Goldberg on the set of Knocked Up and later on the set of Superbad to discuss the project. Green cited The Blues Brothers, Midnight Run, Running Scared, The Gravy Train and Stir Crazy as his inspirations and influences on directing the film. One particular aspect of the film that has been almost universally praised is the cinematography; Rogen even joked on the commentary that "even people who hate the movie admit that it's shot well".

Rogen was originally going to play Saul, but Apatow suggested that James Franco should play the role instead. After a table read, Rogen agreed, thus casting himself in the role of Dale Denton. Rogen spoke with musician Huey Lewis about writing and performing the film's theme song in November 2007.

== Release ==
=== Marketing ===
A red-band trailer for the film, featuring the song "Paper Planes" by M.I.A., leaked in February 2008. Sony Pictures had the video removed from YouTube within a few days of its posting. Patrick Goldstein's Summer Movie Posse of the Los Angeles Times described its incorporation as "the most impressive use of M.I.A.'s 'Paper Planes' ever". The filmmakers had been keen on including the song in the film's main trailer and approached M.I.A.'s U.S. label Interscope Records for permission. She added "Interscope asked me and I was, like, well, since it's just the trailer, that's cool. I didn't really think twice about it" stating she would have thought more carefully about permitting the song's use if it was in the main film, "scrutinizing what scene they were using it in and stuff like that". Pineapple Express had an advance screening at the Just for Laughs Film Festival on July 19, 2008. The film was released on August 6, 2008. Cable network FX pre-bought exclusive rights to air the film after its theatrical run.

A sneak peek of the film was attached to the Superbad DVD, which was released on December 4, 2007.

=== Home media ===
The film was released on DVD and Blu-ray on January 6, 2009. Both rated and unrated versions of the film are available. It was released on DVD and Blu-ray in Australia on December 31, 2008. Both the Blu-ray and 2-disc DVD versions of the film come with a digital copy of the unrated film. It was released on 4K Ultra HD Blu-ray on March 1, 2016.

== Reception ==
=== Box office ===
Pineapple Express opened theatrically on August 8, 2008, and it grossed $12.1 million on its opening day. Over the weekend, it opened at number two behind The Dark Knight with $23.2 million, a five-day total of $41.3 million. The film went on to gross $87.3 million in the U.S. and Canada and $14.2 million in other territories, for a worldwide total of $101.5 million against a $26 million budget.

=== Critical response ===
On review aggregator Rotten Tomatoes, Pineapple Express holds an approval rating of 68% based on 200 reviews and an average rating of 6.3/10. The site's critical summary reads, "Both funny and scattershot, this loose-knit action/buddy/stoner comedy bridges genres and keeps a steady tempo of lowball laughs." On Metacritic, the film has a weighted average score of 64 out of 100, based on 37 critics, indicating "generally favorable reviews". Audiences polled by CinemaScore gave the film an average grade of "B+" on an A+ to F scale.

Michael Phillips of the Chicago Tribune praised the film's script, noting that it "recalls what made Superbad worth seeing: the sidewinding conversational riffs, the why-am-I-laughing? wordplay." However, he was critical of the second half of the film and felt that the violence in contrast to the comedy of the first half was jarring and gratuitous. Kelly Vance of East Bay Express enjoyed Franco's performance, stating that he "steals the movie easily", as well as the authenticity of the film's sets.

== Music ==
The original motion picture soundtrack to the film was released on August 5, 2008. Although featured in the trailer for the film, the song "Paper Planes" by M.I.A. is not used in the film or included on its soundtrack. Following the trailer's release, "Paper Planes" gained massive airplay and reached the top 5 on the Billboard Hot 100 singles chart. Also featured in the film but absent from the soundtrack album are Grace Jones' Sly and Robbie produced cover of Johnny Cash's "Ring of Fire", the former of which can be found on her 1998 compilation Private Life: The Compass Point Sessions.

1. "Pineapple Express" by Huey Lewis and the News (4:27)
2. "Electric Avenue" by Eddy Grant (3:48)
3. "Dr. Greenthumb" by Cypress Hill (3:08)
4. "Lost at Birth" by Public Enemy (3:33)
5. "Poison" by Bell Biv DeVoe (4:20)
6. "Wanted Dread and Alive" by Peter Tosh (4:22)
7. "Don't Look Around" by Mountain (3:44)
8. "Pineapple Chase (aka The Reprise of the Phoenix)" by Graeme Revell (3:03)
9. "Bird's Lament" by Moondog & The London Saxophonic (2:02)
10. "Coconut Girl" by Brother Noland (3:36)
11. "Hi'ilawe" by Arthur Lyman (1:09)
12. "Time Will Tell" by Bob Marley (3:31)
13. "Tha Crossroads" by Bone Thugs-n-Harmony (3:45)
14. "Pineapple Fight (aka The Nemesis Proclaimed)" by Graeme Revell (3:08)
15. "I Didn't Mean to Hurt You" by Spiritualized (5:12)
16. "Everybody Have Fun Tonight" by Wang Chung (4:48)
17. "Woke Up Laughing" by Robert Palmer (3:35)

== Cancelled sequel ==
Due to the film's critical and commercial success, Rogen, Goldberg and Apatow were interested in producing a sequel. However, said sequel never came to fruition, with Rogen saying "I think we probably wanted too much money" as Apatow had placed the necessary cost of the sequel at $50 million while Sony capped it at $45 million. On April 1, 2013, Sony released a fake trailer for Pineapple Express 2, which was actually a teaser trailer for Rogen and Goldberg's 2013 film This Is the End and later shown in that film itself. According to Rogen and Goldberg, the homemade Pineapple Express 2 film in This Is the End depicts what they envision for the actual sequel.
