= Shauna Robertson =

Canadian film producer

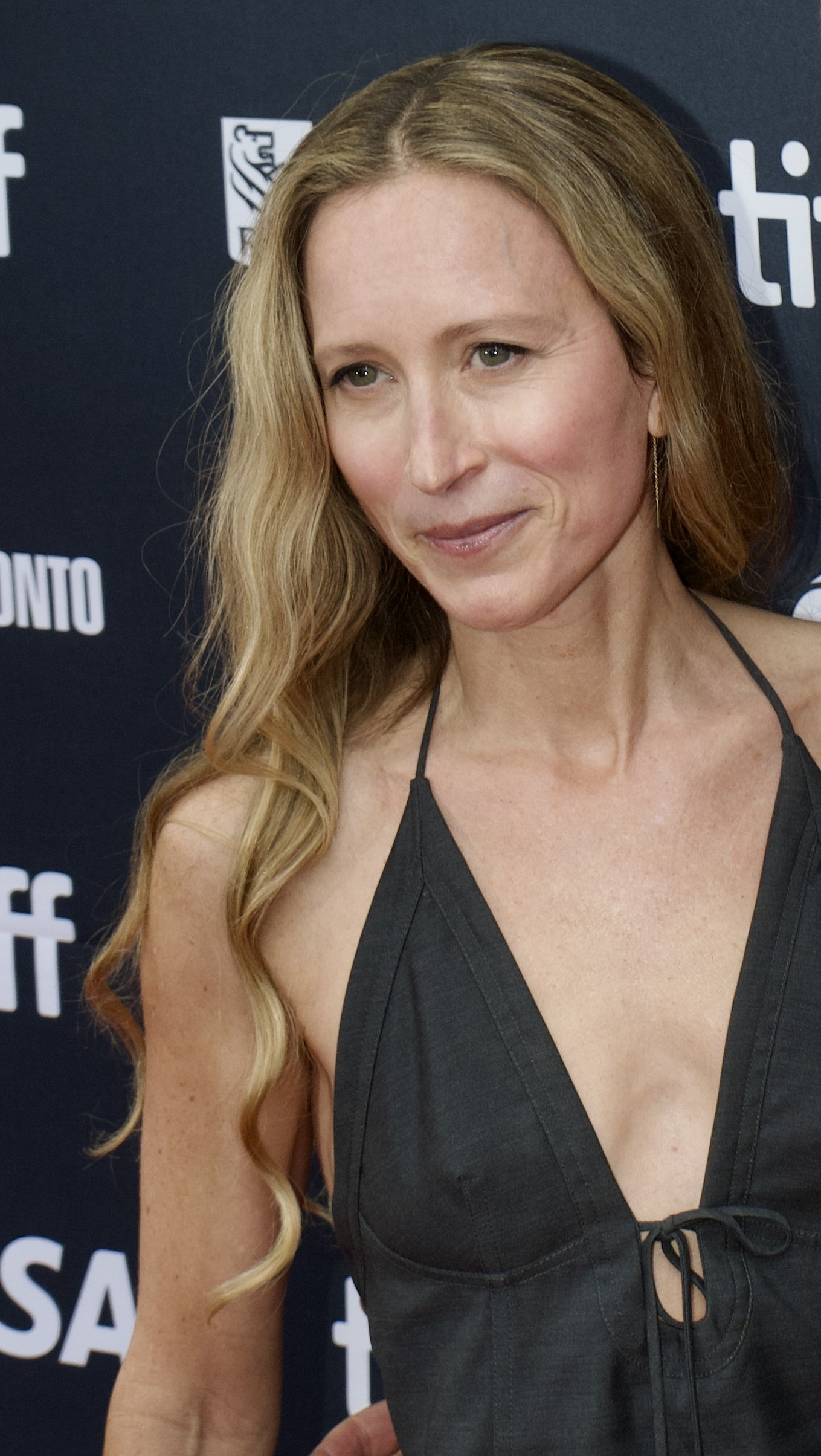
- Robertson at TIFF 2025
- Born: December 18, 1974 (age 51); Markham, Ontario, Canada
- Other name: Shauna Weinberg
- Occupation: Film producer
- Years active: 1999–2008
- Spouse: Edward Norton (m. 2012)
- Children: 2

Shauna Robertson (born December 18, 1974) is a Canadian film producer. From 1999 to 2008, she worked frequently with Judd Apatow, and produced a number of films for Apatow Productions, including Anchorman: The Legend of Ron Burgundy (2004), The 40-Year-Old Virgin (2005), Knocked Up, Superbad (both 2007), Forgetting Sarah Marshall and Pineapple Express (both 2008).

== Early life ==
Robertson was raised in Markham, Ontario. She says her biggest preparation for becoming a producer was having laid back parents: "It's good early training to have an incredibly irresponsible family. It forces a young person to take responsibility, to be organized. My mother called me the benevolent dictator because I liked things done in an efficient way."

Robertson dropped out of high school at the age of 16 to move to Los Angeles, California.

== Career ==
In Los Angeles, Robertson became an assistant to producer and actor Mike Binder, whom she had met at Camp Tamakwa in Algonquin Provincial Park, memorialized in his 1993 film Indian Summer. She went on to work for Hart Bochner, Jay Roach and Adam McKay.

Working with McKay on Elf, she met Will Ferrell, who brought her to work on the set of Anchorman: The Legend of Ron Burgundy, where she first met director-producer Judd Apatow. With Apatow, she produced The 40-Year-Old Virgin in 2005, and Knocked Up and Superbad in 2007 and Forgetting Sarah Marshall and Pineapple Express in 2008.

While Robertson believes that her role as a female producer is to balance out the male humor in films, Apatow has called her "the rare woman who always wants to take the joke farther than any man wants to go. All nudity in my films is a result of Shauna pushing me and calling me a wimp." Actor Jonah Hill has also claimed that Robertson is "way more perverse than any of us", referring to the male writers, directors, producers and actors from Apatow's production company Apatow Productions.

== Personal life ==
Robertson married American actor Edward Norton in 2012. Their son was born in March 2013.

== Filmography ==
Year	Title	Role
1999	Mystery, Alaska	Associate producer
2000	Meet the Parents	Co-producer (as Shauna Weinberg)
2003	Elf	Producer
2004	Anchorman: The Legend of Ron Burgundy	Executive producer
2004	Wake Up, Ron Burgundy: The Lost Movie	Executive producer (direct-to-video)
2005	The 40-Year-Old Virgin	Producer
2007	Knocked Up	Producer
2007	Superbad	Producer
2008	Forgetting Sarah Marshall	Producer
2008	Pineapple Express	Producer
