= Judd Apatow =

American filmmaker (born 1967)

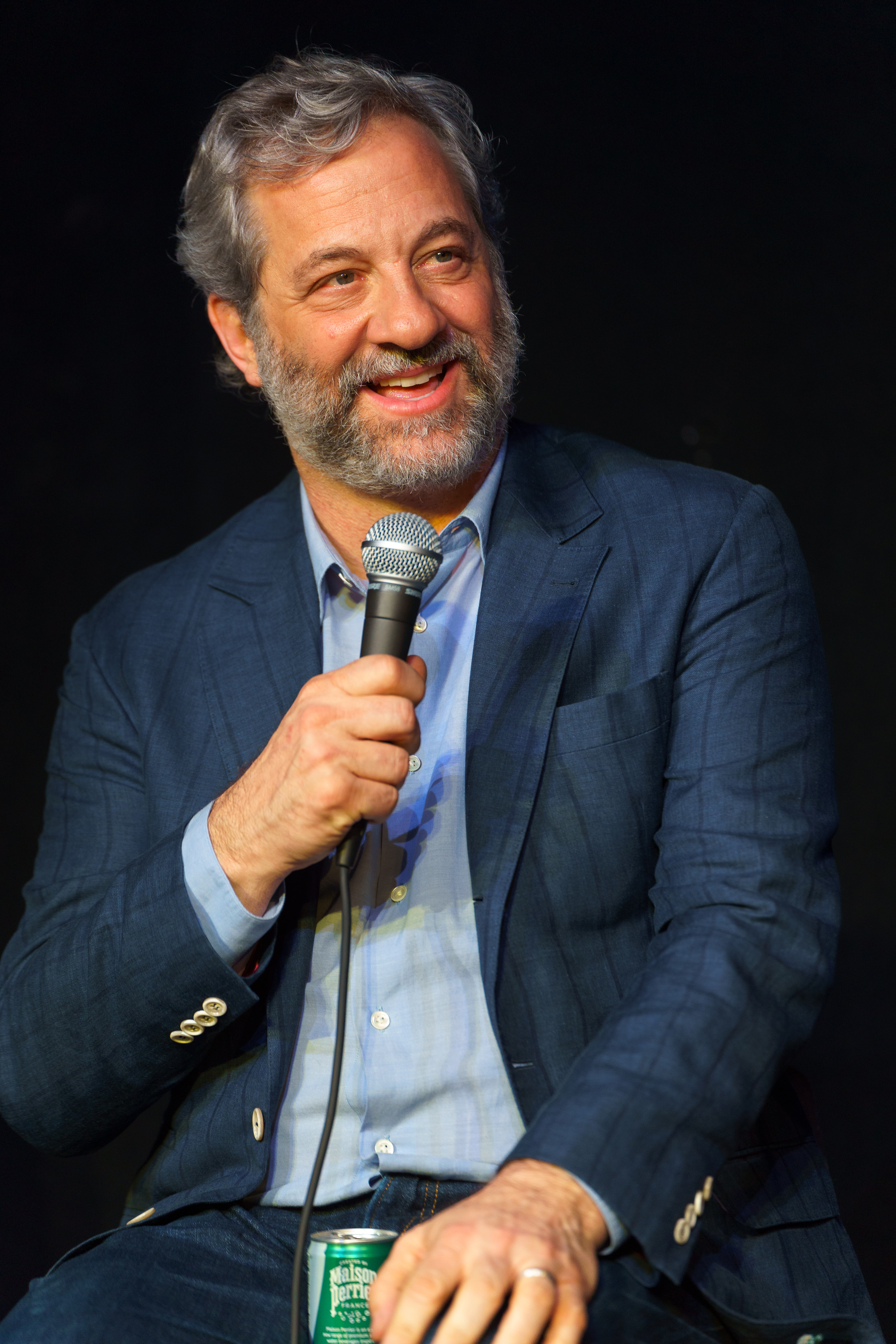
- Apatow in 2024
- Born: December 6, 1967 (age 58); New York City, U.S.
- Education: University of Southern California (dropped out)
- Occupations: Director; producer; writer
- Years active: 1985–present
- Notable work: The 40-Year-Old Virgin; Knocked Up; Funny People; This Is 40; Trainwreck; The King of Staten Island; The Bubble
- Spouse: Leslie Mann (m. 1997)
- Children: Maude; Iris
- Website: juddapatow.com

Judd Apatow (/ˈæpətaʊ/; born December 6, 1967) is an American director, producer and screenwriter known for his work in comedy films. Apatow is the founder of Apatow Productions, through which he wrote, produced, and directed his films The 40-Year-Old Virgin (2005), Knocked Up (2007), Funny People (2009), This Is 40 (2012), Trainwreck (2015), The King of Staten Island (2020), and The Bubble (2022). Through his company, Apatow produced and developed the television series Freaks and Geeks (1999–2000), Undeclared (2001–2002), Funny or Die Presents (2010–2011), Girls (2012–2017), Love (2016–2018), and Crashing (2017–2019). He also produced the films The Cable Guy (1996), Anchorman: The Legend of Ron Burgundy (2004), Talladega Nights: The Ballad of Ricky Bobby (2006), Superbad (2007), Pineapple Express (2008), Forgetting Sarah Marshall (2008), Get Him to the Greek (2010), Bridesmaids (2011), Begin Again (2013), and The Big Sick (2017). His more recent work as producer and director is the highly regarded 2026 Netflix documentary Norm: The Tale of Norm Macdonald.

Throughout his career, Apatow has received nominations for eleven Primetime Emmy Awards (three wins), five Writers Guild of America Awards (one win), two Producers Guild of America Awards, one Golden Globe Award, and one Grammy Award.

== Early life and education ==
The middle of three children of Maury Apatow, a real-estate developer, and Tamara Shad, who ran the music label Mainstream Records founded by her father, Bob Shad, Judd Apatow was born on December 6, 1967, in the Flushing neighborhood of the New York City borough of Queens, and raised in Syosset, New York, on Long Island. His family is Jewish, but nonreligious. Apatow has an older brother, Robert, and a younger sister, Mia. Their mother died in 2008. His maternal grandmother, Molly, co-starred in his film This Is 40.

When Apatow was 12 years old, his parents divorced. Robert went to live with his maternal grandparents, and Mia went to live with her mother. As a child, Apatow lived mainly with his father, and visited his mother on weekends. Apatow's mother spent a summer working at a comedy club, which is where Judd was first exposed to live stand-up comedy.

Apatow's deep interest in comedy dates back to his childhood; his heroes were Steve Martin, Bill Cosby and the Marx Brothers. Apatow got his comic start washing dishes at the Long Island East Side Comedy Club, and while attending Syosset High School, he played jazz and hosted a program called Comedy Club on the school's radio station, WKWZ, which he created as a way to meet and learn from comedians he admired. He cold-called comedians during this period, managing to interview Steve Allen, Howard Stern, Harold Ramis and John Candy, along with emerging comedians such as Jerry Seinfeld, Steven Wright, and Garry Shandling.

== Career ==
=== 1985–2003: Stand-up and early work ===
Apatow began performing stand-up comedy at age seventeen, during his senior year of high school. In the September 1985 issue of Laugh Factory Magazine, he is listed as an associate editor. After graduating from high school in 1985 he moved to Los Angeles and enrolled in the screenwriting program at University of Southern California. While at USC, he organized and hosted a number of on-campus "Comedy Night" events, featuring headliners such as Saturday Night Live performer Kevin Nealon. Apatow introduced the acts at these events with short standup routines of his own. He also began volunteering at (and later producing) benefit concerts for HBO's Comic Relief and performing and seeing standup at the Improv in Hollywood. He dropped out of college during his second year and later moved into an apartment with comedian Adam Sandler, whom he met at the Improv. He competed in the Johnnie Walker Comedy Search in 1989 directed by Saturday Night Live short film producer Neal Marshad.

Shortly thereafter, Apatow was introduced by manager Jimmy Miller to Garry Shandling which resulted in Apatow being hired as a writer for the 1991 Grammy Awards that year, which Shandling hosted. He went on to co-produce comedy specials by Roseanne Arnold, Tom Arnold, and Jim Carrey. In 1992, Apatow appeared on HBO's 15th Annual Young Comedians Special and shortly afterwards went on to co-create and executive produce The Ben Stiller Show for Fox. Apatow had met Stiller outside of an Elvis Costello concert in 1990, and they became friends. Despite critical acclaim and an Emmy Award for Apatow and the rest of the writing staff, Fox canceled the show in 1993.

Apatow went on to join HBO's The Larry Sanders Show in 1993 as a writer and consulting producer, and he later served as a co-executive producer and director of an episode during the show's final season in 1998. He credits Shandling as his mentor for influencing him to write comedy that is more character-driven. Apatow earned six Emmy nominations for his work on Larry Sanders. During this same time, he worked as a consulting producer and staff writer for the animated show The Critic, starring Jon Lovitz.

In 1995, Apatow co-wrote (with Steve Brill) the feature film Heavyweights. Around the same time, Apatow was hired to produce and do an uncredited re-write of the script for the movie The Cable Guy, which was released in 1996 to mixed reviews. It was during the pre-production of the film that Apatow met his future wife, actress Leslie Mann. Apatow did uncredited re-writes on two other Jim Carrey films: Liar Liar and Bruce Almighty. His next script was titled Making Amends, which had Owen Wilson attached to star as a man in Alcoholics Anonymous who decides to apologize to everyone he has ever hurt. However, the film was never made. Apatow did uncredited rewrites of the Adam Sandler films Happy Gilmore and The Wedding Singer. He was also featured in four tracks on Sandler's 1996 comedy album "What the Hell Happened to Me?"

In 1999, Apatow created Sick in the Head, a multi-camera sitcom pilot starring David Krumholtz as a psychiatrist on his first day on the job, Amy Poehler as a suicidal patient, and Kevin Corrigan as Krumholtz's slacker roommate. The show was not picked up by Fox, which freed up Apatow to serve as an executive producer of the award-winning series Freaks and Geeks, which debuted in 1999. He also wrote and directed several episodes of the series. After its cancellation, Apatow was the executive producer and creator of the series Undeclared, which reused Seth Rogen in the main cast and other Freaks and Geeks cast members in recurring roles. Although both shows were quickly canceled, USA Today media critic Susan Wloszczyna called the shows "two of the most acclaimed TV series to ever last only one season".

In 2001, Apatow created North Hollywood, a pilot that featured Jason Segel, Kevin Hart, Seth Rogen, Phil Hendrie, and Judge Reinhold (playing himself). The pilot was not picked up by ABC. In 2002, he co-wrote (with Brent Forrester) a Fox pilot titled Life on Parole, starring David Herman as a dissatisfied parole officer whose roommate happens to be one of his parolees; it was not picked up. Apatow has screened and introduced them at "The Other Network", a festival of un-aired TV pilots produced by Un-Cabaret.

=== 2004–2008: Career breakthrough ===
In 2004, Apatow produced the feature film comedy Anchorman: The Legend of Ron Burgundy, starring Will Ferrell and directed by Adam McKay. The film was a box office success. Apatow co-produced the 2013 sequel, Anchorman 2: The Legend Continues. He made his feature directorial debut in 2005 with the comedy The 40-Year-Old Virgin, which he also co-wrote with the film's star, Steve Carell, for Universal Pictures. The film opened at number one at the box office and grossed more than $175 million globally. The comedy garnered numerous awards and nominations, including being named one of AFI's Top Movies of the Year, as well as taking home Best Comedy Movie at the 11th annual Critics' Choice Awards. The 40-Year-Old Virgin also earned Apatow a nomination for Best Original Screenplay from the Writers Guild of America and received four MTV Movie Award nominations, including a win for Carell for Best Comedic Performance. In 2005, Apatow co-wrote with Nicholas Stoller the feature film comedy Fun with Dick and Jane starring Jim Carrey and Téa Leoni. The film went on to gross $205 million worldwide.

His second film, the romantic comedy Knocked Up, was released in June 2007 to wide critical acclaim. Apatow wrote the initial draft of the film on the set of Talladega Nights. The story concerns a slacker and a media personality (Rogen and Heigl, respectively) whose one-night stand results in an unintended pregnancy. In addition to being a critical success, the film was also a commercial hit, continuing Apatow's newfound mainstream success.

Critical reception of Apatow's films during this period included some commentary on their portrayal of gender and humor. In 2007, filmmaker Mike White expressed disappointment with Apatow's later work, criticizing what he saw as the treatment of women and gay characters, and remarked that Knocked Up at times felt like "comedy of the bullies, rather than the bullied". Media commentary also noted the use of derogatory language toward the LGBTQ community by characters in some of his comedies. Actress Katherine Heigl, who starred in Knocked Up, described the film as "a little sexist", arguing that it portrayed women as overly rigid while depicting men as more sympathetic. Apatow responded that such traits reflected the immaturity of the characters rather than an endorsement of those attitudes, stating that the film focuses on people "who are afraid of women and relationships and learn to grow up".

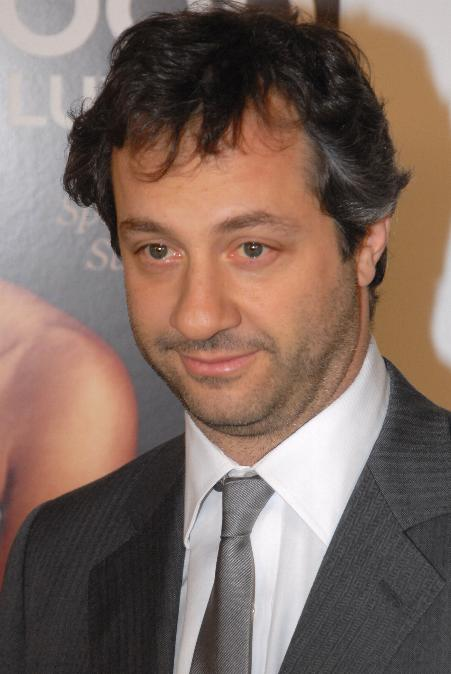
Apatow in 2007

In August 2007, Apatow produced the film Superbad, which was written by Seth Rogen and his writing partner Evan Goldberg. A concept Rogen and Goldberg had created as teens, Apatow convinced Rogen to write the film as a vehicle for himself in 2000. Rogen and Goldberg finished writing the film, but were unable to find a studio interested in producing it. Apatow then enlisted Rogen and Goldberg to write Pineapple Express, a stoner action movie that he felt would be more commercial. After the success of Anchorman and The 40-Year-Old Virgin, Apatow was still unable to sell both Superbad and Pineapple Express; it was only after he produced the commercial hit Talladega Nights that Sony Pictures Entertainment decided to produce both.

At this point, Rogen was unable to play the lead for Superbad, as he had grown too old to play the part of Seth. Subsequently, he was cast in a supporting role as a police officer and friend Jonah Hill took his role as the high school student. Apatow credits Rogen for influencing him to make his work more "outrageously dirty".

In August 2007, Superbad opened at No. 1 in the box office to critical acclaim, taking in $33 million in its opening weekend. Industry insiders claimed Apatow was now a brand unto himself, creating movies geared toward older audiences, who would watch his movies even when the films delved into the teen genre.

Apatow served as producer and co-writer along with director Jake Kasdan for the biopic spoof Walk Hard starring John C. Reilly, Kristen Wiig and Jenna Fischer, which was released in December 2007. While the film received positive reviews, it did poorly commercially. In 2008, he served as producer for Drillbit Taylor starring Owen Wilson and Leslie Mann and written by Seth Rogen, which opened in March and earned negative reviews.

For the rest of 2008, Apatow produced the comedy films Forgetting Sarah Marshall starring Jason Segel and Kristen Bell; Step Brothers, which reunites Talladega Nights co-stars Will Ferrell and John C. Reilly; and Pineapple Express starring Seth Rogen and James Franco, both of whom originally starred on Freaks and Geeks. In addition, he served as co-writer for the Adam Sandler comedy film You Don't Mess with the Zohan, which Sandler and Robert Smigel also co-wrote and went on to gross $204 million at the worldwide box office.

He tries to keep a low budget on his projects and usually makes his movies about the work itself rather than using big stars. After his success in film, he hired the entire writing staff from Undeclared to write movies for Apatow Productions. He never fires writers and he keeps them on projects through all stages of productions, known colloquially as "the comedy wheel". Apatow is not committed to any specific studio, but his projects are typically set up at Universal and Sony, and in 2009 Variety reported that Universal had signed him to a 3 picture directing deal. Apatow once vowed to include a penis in every one of his movies. He explained his position as, "I like movies that are, you know, uplifting and hopeful...and I like filth!"

=== 2009–2015: Established stardom ===
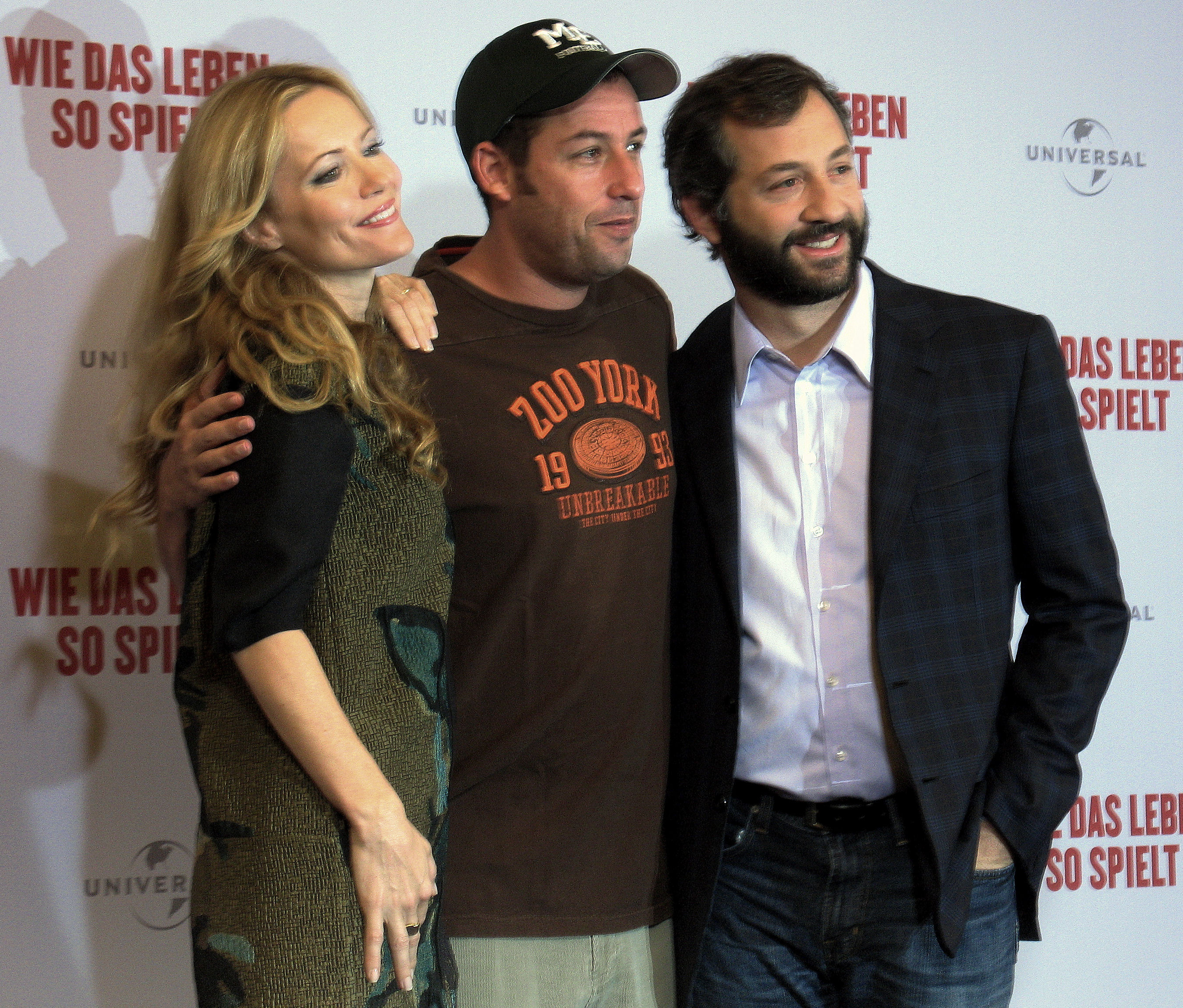
Apatow (right) with Leslie Mann and Adam Sandler in Berlin (2009)

In 2009, Apatow served as producer for the biblical comedy film Year One; the film was not well received. He also released his third directorial feature on July 31 that same year, titled Funny People. Apatow wrote the film, which starred Adam Sandler and Seth Rogen as a pair of standup comedians, one of whom has a terminal illness. Other co-stars included his wife Leslie Mann and Eric Bana, who was a comedic actor in Australia before appearing in American films. The film contained more dramatic elements than Apatow's previous directorial efforts. Although the film was not financially successful (grossing $54 million domestically), the critical reception was primarily positive, with David Denby of The New Yorker magazine including the film on his top ten films of 2009, calling Funny People "a serious comedy about a funny man's brush with death" and stating that the film "is Apatow's richest, most complicated movie yet—a summing up of his feelings about comedy and its relation to the rest of existence." New York Times critic A.O. Scott, reflecting on summer films of 2009, opined that Funny People was "a movie about growing up, feeling sad, facing death—a long, serious film whose subject is the challenge of maturity. Which may be why, in the face of a softish opening weekend, various interpreters of box office data were quick to declare Funny People a flop. The summer is no time for grown-ups."

In 2010, Apatow served as producer on the Forgetting Sarah Marshall spin-off Get Him to the Greek with Russell Brand reprising his role and Jonah Hill returning from the original film, albeit as a different character. Released by Universal, the film did well at the box office, grossing $92 million. In 2011, Apatow produced Bridesmaids which grossed $288.4 million worldwide and received Oscar nominations for Best Supporting Actress (Melissa McCarthy) and Best Original Screenplay (Annie Mumolo and Kristen Wiig), as well as two Golden Globe Award nominations and two Screen Actors Guild Award nominations. Bridesmaids also won a Critics' Choice Movie Award for Best Comedy Movie, a People's Choice Award for Favorite Comedy Movie and was named one of AFI's Movies of the Year. That same year, he produced Girls after seeing Lena Dunham's 2010 film Tiny Furniture. The series ran from 2012 to 2017 and generating criticism over its depiction of sexual assault, male ejaculate, and Dunham's frequent on-screen nudity. In a January 2013 interview in Fast Company, Apatow and Dunham discussed the creative process of working on the show, saying that "this type of show is an auteur's vision. It isn't collaborative in the same way as other shows. We are probably closer to Curb Your Enthusiasm than we are to something like Friends." In later interviews, Apatow reflected on the tone of his earlier work, noting that it often reflected a predominantly male perspective. He stated that his projects varied in focus and pointed to Freaks and Geeks as an example of a story centered on a female protagonist.

Apatow produced Wanderlust (2012), starring Jennifer Aniston and Paul Rudd as a married couple who leave New York City and live in a hippie commune. He also produced The Five-Year Engagement (2012), featuring Jason Segel and Emily Blunt as a couple who have a rocky five-year engagement.

Apatow's fourth directorial effort, the Knocked Up spin-off This Is 40, was released by Universal Pictures on December 21, 2012, starring Paul Rudd and Leslie Mann as the characters Pete and Debbie (reprising their roles from Knocked Up) and had original music by Graham Parker and The Rumour (who play themselves). The film received mostly positive reactions from critics, with The New Yorker's Richard Brody writing that This Is 40 is "the stuff of life, and it flows like life, and, like life, it would be good for it to last longer."

In 2012, Entertainment Weekly reported that 22 years after writing an episode of The Simpsons, Apatow's script ("Bart's New Friend") was being developed into an episode that would air in 2015. Apatow co-produced Anchorman 2: The Legend Continues, which was released December 18, 2013, with the plot focusing on "Ron Burgundy's struggle to find his place in the rise of new media and the 24-hour news cycle". Apatow produced Begin Again (2013), starring Keira Knightley who plays a singer-songwriter who is discovered by a struggling record label executive (played by Mark Ruffalo) and collaborates with him to produce an album recorded in public locations all over New York City. Writer-director John Carney first pitched the film in 2010 to Apatow, who produced the film alongside Tobin Armbrust and Anthony Bregman whose production company Exclusive Media financed the film's US$8 million budget.

Apatow's fifth directorial feature was the 2015 romantic comedy entitled Trainwreck. Amy Schumer wrote and starred in the film as "a basket case who tries to rebuild her life" by attempting to commit to a serious relationship with a sports doctor (Bill Hader), after a string of one-night stands with different men. The Atlantic's Christopher Orr opined that "this is a film that belongs not to its director but to its star, who, if there is any justice in the world, is about to ascend from cult icon to mass phenomenon." The film received an 85% on Rotten Tomatoes. Produced on a budget of $35 million, Trainwreck grossed $140.8 million worldwide.

In November 2017, Apatow returned to stand-up after a long hiatus to headline a show in New York City's Carnegie Hall called Judd Apatow and Friends. He announced over Twitter that the show would benefit Everytown for Gun Safety, a non-profit organization founded by Michael Bloomberg which advocates for gun control and against gun violence.

=== 2016–present: Career expansion ===
In 2016, he created the Netflix television comedy series Love, on which he also serves as a writer and executive producer. The series followed a young couple navigating the thrills and agonies of modern relationships, and ran on Netflix for three seasons. Later that year, HBO picked up Crashing, a semi-autobiographical television series which follows Pete Holmes as he tries to become a stand-up comedian after his wife cheats on him. It's only with the help of other famous comedians (playing fictional versions of themselves) that Pete is able to learn the ropes of the stand-up comedy world. The series was created by and stars comedian Pete Holmes, and executive produced by Apatow. It was first reported in 2010 that Apatow would be producing a new Pee-wee Herman film starring Paul Reubens that would be written by Rebuens and Paul Rust. The film, Pee-wee's Big Holiday, was released by Netflix in March 2016.

Apatow made his first documentary piece in 2016, Doc and Darryl, which documents the career and relationship of New York Mets players Dwight "Doc" Gooden and Darryl Strawberry. It aired as part of ESPN's series of sports documentaries 30 for 30 in July 2016.

In 2017, he produced the romantic comedy The Big Sick. The film stars Kumail Nanjiani as himself, a stand-up comedian who comes from a Muslim Pakistani background and falls in love with an American woman, based on Nanjiani's real-life wife Emily V. Gordon. Produced on a budget of $5 million, it grossed $56.4 million worldwide. A New York Times review described the movie as "a joyous, generous-hearted romantic comedy that, even as it veers into difficult terrain, insists that we just need to keep on laughing" while revitalizing "the often moribund romantic comedy subgenre with a true story of love, death and the everyday comedy of being a 21st-century American". In 2018, the film was nominated for an Academy Award in the category of best Original Screenplay. Additionally it won Best Comedy at the Critics' Choice Awards and received an AFI Movies of the Year Award from the American Film Institute. The film also received two Screen Actors Guild nominations and an NAACP Image Award nomination. Apatow was nominated for the Darryl F. Zanuck Award for Outstanding Producer of Theatrical Motion Pictures award by the Producers Guild of America, alongside producing partner Barry Mendel.

Earlier that year, Apatow produced Chris Gethard's HBO comedy special Career Suicide, an hour and a half long monologue about Gethard's experience with depression, therapy and search for fulfillment. The program was described as being able to "articulate intense and often ineffable emotion" while still remaining "brazenly candid...and packed with great jokes". In a review for The A.V. Club, Erik Adams wrote "There is a feeling that somewhere, somehow, someone is going to stumble-upon Career Suicide, and it's going to make them feel less alone."

Apatow also starred in his first stand-up special, Judd Apatow: The Return, in December 2017. The special was recorded during the Just for Laughs comedy festival in Montreal, Canada the previous July and released through Netflix. Apatow also had a cameo role in The Disaster Artist (2017), which chronicles the making of the film The Room. The New Yorker critic Richard Brody felt the role was a "reminder" that Apatow should play a lead in one of his own films. Along with documentarian Michael Bonfiglio, Apatow co-directed the documentary May It Last: A Portrait of the Avett Brothers, which chronicles the making of the titular band's album True Sadness. It aired on HBO in January 2018 and later won the SXSW Audience Award at the SXSW film festival.

Later in 2018, he directed another HBO documentary, The Zen Diaries of Garry Shandling, exploring the life and legacy of comedian Garry Shandling, one of Apatow's idols and a close friend. After editing together video packages for Garry Shandling's memorial service, Apatow realized that the material was worthy of a full documentary. NPR's David Bianculi called the documentary, "a deeply affecting TV show about the meaning of life – right up there with the final TV interviews by mythologist Joseph Campbell and British TV writer Dennis Potter. In his comedy, Garry Shandling always was in pursuit of the truth and contemplating real life. With this two-part HBO special, he and Judd Apatow achieved that very beautifully one last time." In September 2018, Apatow took home the outstanding documentary or nonfiction special award at the Creative Arts Emmy Awards for his work on the documentary.

In June 2020, Apatow's seventh directorial film, The King of Staten Island, co-written with and starring Pete Davidson, was to be released in theatres but due to the ongoing COVID-19 pandemic it was instead released to video on demand on the 12th of June to positive reviews from critics.

In 2022, Apatow, Joshua Church, and Nicholas Stoller co-produced Bros, the first major studio rom-com with an all LGBTQ cast. The film stars Billy Eichner, Luke Macfarlane, Ts Madison, Monica Raymund, Guillermo Díaz, Guy Branum, and Amanda Bearse.

Apatow memorialized the friendship of comics Bob Newhart and Don Rickles in Bob & Don: A Love Story—a 2023 short documentary film featuring interviews with and home movies of both families.

In 2026, Apatow, along with Michael Bonfiglio, co-directed the Mel Brooks documentary The 99 Year Old Man!

== Personal life ==
The Academy of Motion Picture Arts and Sciences rejected his first application for membership, even though he was sponsored by Academy Award-winning screenwriters Akiva Goldsman and Stephen Gaghan. Seth Rogen claimed Apatow "just wanted the free DVDs". He became a member in 2008.

=== Marriage and children ===
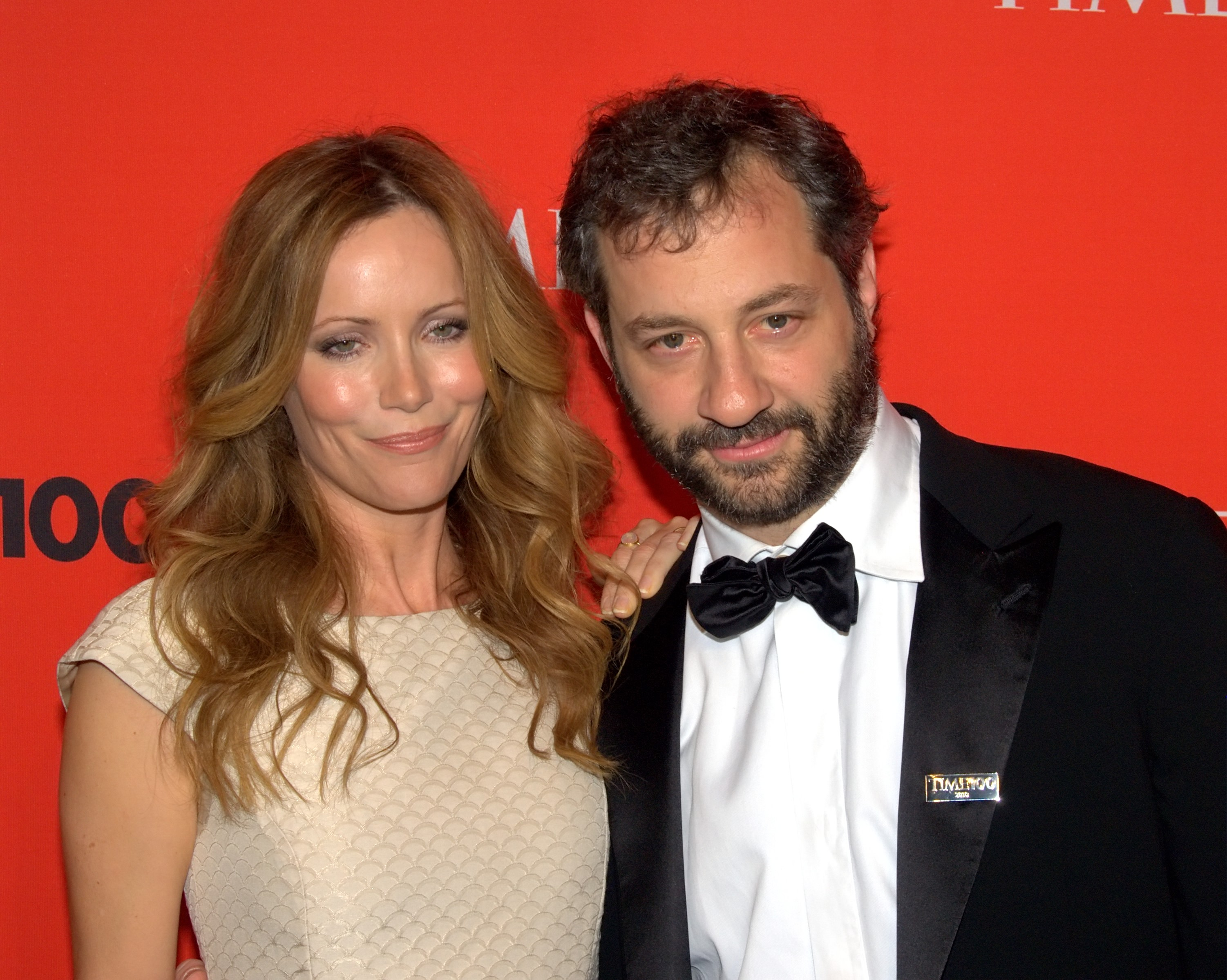
Apatow with his wife, actress Leslie Mann

Apatow met actress Leslie Mann on the set of the 1996 comedy film The Cable Guy, where he served as producer and she was cast as the girlfriend of Matthew Broderick's character. They were married on June 9, 1997, in Los Angeles, and have two daughters, Maude and Iris. Mann has appeared in Freaks and Geeks, The 40-Year-Old Virgin, Knocked Up, Drillbit Taylor, Funny People, and This Is 40. Both daughters appeared in Knocked Up, Funny People, and This Is 40, as Leslie Mann's character's daughters, and Maude was nominated at the 34th Young Artist Awards for Best Performance in a Feature Film – Supporting Young Actress for This Is 40.

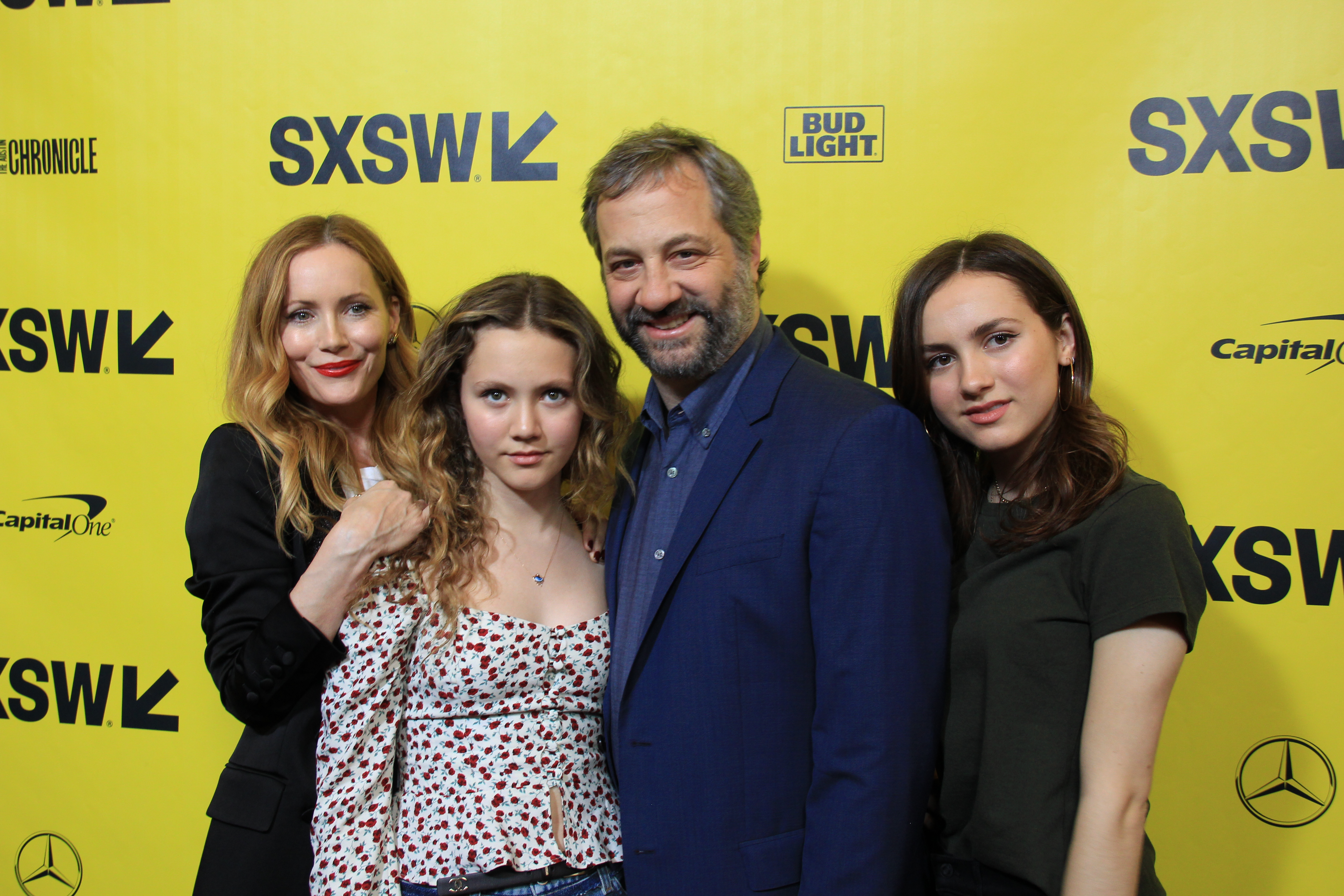
Apatow and his family

=== Philanthropy ===
Apatow's philanthropic work includes supporting the literacy organization 826LA, the Bogart Pediatric Cancer Research Program, and Children's Cancer Research Center at Children's hospital. He edited the book I Found This Funny published by McSweeneys to benefit 826LA. Additionally, Apatow's book, "Sick in the Head", in which he interviews comedy icons such as Jerry Seinfeld and Jay Leno, benefitted the 826LA organization.

Apatow has also received several high-profile awards for his advocacy and support of women in Hollywood, as well as victims of sexual assault. In 2015, he was honored by the Rape Treatment Foundation, who later released a statement on Apatow's contributions, describing him as "a powerful voice for the truths about rape and an advocate for respectful treatment of victims". Apatow has repeatedly expressed support for the #MeToo and #TimesUp movements and has frequently used his platform to condemn perpetrators such as Bill Cosby.

In 2017, Apatow was awarded the ACLU Bill of Rights Award, for being "an outspoken and tireless advocate on behalf of women in the arts".

Apatow regularly performs stand-up at the Largo at the Coronet, a comedy venue in Los Angeles, as part of his Judd Apatow and Friends series. Guests have included Adam Sandler, Zach Galifianakis, Ryan Adams, Beck, David Spade, Garry Shandling and Jackson Browne. Each show benefits a charity of Apatow's choosing and past charities have included St. Jude Children's Research Hospital, 826LA and Alzheimer's Association.

== Awards and nominations ==
During his work on the Larry Sanders Show, Apatow was nominated for five Emmys, as well as a Critics' Choice Television Award. In 2007, he was nominated for a Grammy for co-writing the song "Walk Hard" (nominated for Best Song Written for Motion Picture). Apatow's work was also nominated for Outstanding Comedy Series at the 2012 and 2013 Primetime Emmys for Girls and was also nominated at the Critics' Choice Television Awards for Girls. In 2012, Apatow received the Hollywood Comedy Award at the 16th annual Hollywood Film Awards presented by the Hollywood Film Festival. Additionally in 2012, Apatow was presented with the Herb Sargent Award for Comedy Excellence from the Writers Guild East.

In 2015, Apatow's film Trainwreck was nominated for 2 Golden Globe Awards, including a nomination for Best Motion Picture – Musical or Comedy, the first film directed by Apatow to achieve this feat. The film was also nominated for 3 Critics' Choice Movie Awards, including Best Comedy. In 2016, Apatow was awarded the Generation Award at the Just for Laughs comedy festival in Montreal for his contributions to comedy.

== Filmography ==
=== Film ===
Year	Title	Director	Writer	Producer	Notes
1995	Heavyweights	No	Yes	Executive	
1996	Celtic Pride	No	Yes	Yes	
2005	The 40-Year-Old Virgin	Yes	Yes	Yes	
2005	Fun with Dick and Jane	No	Yes	No	
2007	Knocked Up	Yes	Yes	Yes	
2007	Walk Hard: The Dewey Cox Story	No	Yes	Yes	
2008	You Don't Mess with the Zohan	No	Yes	No	
2008	Pineapple Express	No	Story	Yes	
2009	Funny People	Yes	Yes	Yes	
2012	This Is 40	Yes	Yes	Yes	
2015	Trainwreck	Yes	No	Yes	
2017	May It Last: A Portrait of The Avett Brothers	Yes	No	Yes	Documentary
2020	The King of Staten Island	Yes	Yes	Yes	
2022	The Bubble	Yes	Yes	Yes	
2023	Bob and Don: A Love Story	Yes	No	Executive	Documentary
2026	Paralyzed by Hope: The Maria Bamford Story	Yes	No	Yes	Documentary
2026	Norm: The Tale of Norm Macdonald	Yes	No	Yes	Documentary
2027	The Comeback King	Yes	Yes	Yes	Filming

Producer only

Year	Title	Notes
1992	Crossing the Bridge	
1996	The Cable Guy	
2004	Anchorman: The Legend of Ron Burgundy	
2005	Kicking & Screaming	Executive
2006	Talladega Nights: The Ballad of Ricky Bobby	
2006	The TV Set	Executive
2007	Superbad	
2008	Drillbit Taylor	
2008	Forgetting Sarah Marshall	
2008	Step Brothers	
2009	Year One	
2010	Get Him to the Greek	
2011	Bridesmaids	
2012	Wanderlust	
2012	The Five-Year Engagement	
2013	Begin Again	
2013	Anchorman 2: The Legend Continues	
2016	Pee-wee's Big Holiday	
2016	Popstar: Never Stop Never Stopping	
2017	The Big Sick	
2018	Juliet, Naked	
2022	Bros	
2023	Please Don't Destroy: The Treasure of Foggy Mountain	
2024	Stormy	Executive; Documentary
2025	You Had to Be There	Executive; Documentary
2025	The New Yorker at 100	Executive; Documentary
2025	Poetic License	

=== Television ===
Year	Title	Credited as				Notes
Year	Title	Director	Writer	Executive Producer	Creator	Notes
1991	Tom Arnold: The Naked Truth	No	Yes	Co-producer	No	Stand-up special
1992	Tom Arnold: The Naked Truth 2	No	Yes	Co-producer	No	Stand-up special
1992–1993	The Ben Stiller Show	No	Yes	Yes	Yes	13 episodes
1993	Tom Arnold: The Naked Truth 3	No	Yes	Co-producer	No	Stand-up special
1993–1998	The Larry Sanders Show	Yes	Yes	Consulting; Co-executive	No	76 episodes
1994–1995	The Critic	No	Yes	Consulting	No	21 episodes
1999–2000	Freaks and Geeks	Yes	Yes	Yes	No	18 episodes
2001–2002	Undeclared	Yes	Yes	Yes	Yes	17 episodes
2010–2011	Funny or Die Presents	No	Yes	Yes	Yes	36 episodes
2012–2017	Girls	No	Yes	Yes	No	62 episodes
2015	The Simpsons	No	Yes	No	No	Episode: "Bart's New Friend"
2016	30 for 30	Yes	No	Yes	No	Episode: "Doc & Darryl"
2016–2018	Love	Yes	Yes	Yes	Yes	34 episodes
2017–2019	Crashing	Yes	Yes	Yes	No	24 episodes
2018	The Zen Diaries of Garry Shandling	Yes	No	No	No	Documentary; Also producer
2022	George Carlin's American Dream	Yes	No	Yes	No	Documentary
2026	Mel Brooks: The 99 Year Old Man!	Yes	No	Yes	No	Documentary

Executive producer only

Year	Title	Notes
2016	Hannibal Buress: Hannibal Takes Edinburgh	Documentary
2016	Pete Holmes: Faces And Sounds	Stand-up special
2017	Chris Gethard: Career Suicide	Stand-up special
2017	Jerry Before Seinfeld	Stand-up special
2018	Loudon Wainwright III: Surviving Twin	Music special
2018	Pete Holmes: Dirty Clean	Stand-up special
2019	Gary Gulman: The Great Depresh	Stand-up special

Co-producer only

Year	Title	Notes
1991	Jim Carrey: Unnatural Act	Stand-up special
1992	Roseanne Arnold	Stand-up special

=== Acting credits ===
Year	Title	Role	Notes
1992	The Ben Stiller Show	Foxy The Fox, Jay Leno	3 episodes
1994	The Critic	Jay Leno (voice)	Episode: "L.A. Jay"
1995	Heavyweights	Homer	
1995	NewsRadio	Goofy Ball (voice)	Episode: "Goofy Ball"
2004	Anchorman: The Legend of Ron Burgundy	News Station Employee	
2006	Help Me Help You	Judd	2 episodes
2011	Zookeeper	Barry The Elephant (voice)	
2014	The Simpsons	Himself (voice)	Episode: "Steal This Episode"
2016–2017	Lady Dynamite	Himself	2 episodes
2017	Sandy Wexler	Testimonial	
2017	The Disaster Artist	Hollywood Producer	Uncredited cameo
2017	Judd Apatow: The Return	Himself	Stand-up special
2024	Stupid Pet Tricks	Himself	Episode: "Judd Apatow Gets Fired"
2024	When We Went Mad	Himself	Documentary Film
2026	Why Mr. Rogers Still Matters Today	Himself	PBS Documentary

== Recurring collaborators ==
Apatow has worked with a group of actors on an ongoing basis, including Steve Carell, Paul Rudd, Seth Rogen, Jonah Hill, and Jason Segel, and also tends to work with his close friends and family. He has frequently worked with producers Shauna Robertson and Barry Mendel. To date, Seth Rogen has been involved with eight of Apatow's projects, as an actor, writer, and/or producer. Apatow's wife Leslie Mann has starred in five, Will Ferrell has starred in five, Paul Rudd has starred in nine, Jonah Hill has starred in seven, and Jason Segel has starred in four (as well as written two). Apatow has produced four projects written by Adam McKay and Will Ferrell. Saturday Night Live and Bridesmaids star Kristen Wiig has appeared in five Apatow movies and, alongside Mann, is Apatow's main female collaborator.

Kristen Wiig, in a speech presenting Apatow with the Herb Sargent Award for Comedy Excellence in February 2012 said that he was an "incredible collaborator and supporter" In a 2011 interview with Elle, television actress and writer Lena Dunham, who has collaborated often with Apatow said of his work, "Knocked Up is really about love. [...] His movies are about people trying to get closer to themselves. He's the perfect match for a story about being 25, because that's all 25-year-olds are interested in. The other problems they encounter—money issues, conflicts at work—don't matter."

Actors who have appeared in three or more of Apatow's films or series, as well as This Is the End, a film which Apatow did not produce but features many actors who worked with him over previous years:

Work Actor	1999–2000	2001–2002	2005	2007	2007	2008	2009	2012	2013	2022
Work Actor	Freaks and Geeks	Undeclared	The 40-Year-Old Virgin	Walk Hard: The Dewey Cox Story	Knocked Up	Pineapple Express	Funny People	This Is 40	This Is the End	The Bubble
Iris Apatow	No	No	No	No	Yes	No	Yes	Yes	No	Yes
Maude Apatow	No	No	No	No	Yes	No	Yes	Yes	No	No
Steve Bannos	Yes	Yes	Yes	No	No	No	Yes	No	No	No
Gerry Bednob	No	Yes	Yes	Yes	No	No	No	No	No	No
James Franco	Yes	No	No	No	Yes	Yes	No	No	Yes	No
Wayne Federman	No	No	Yes	No	Yes	No	Yes	No	No	No
Carla Gallo	No	Yes	Yes	No	No	No	Yes	No	No	No
Bill Hader	No	No	No	No	Yes	Yes	No	Yes	No	No
Jonah Hill	No	No	Yes	Yes	Yes	No	Yes	No	Yes	No
David Krumholtz	Yes	Yes	No	Yes	No	No	No	No	Yes	No
Justin Long	No	No	No	Yes	No	Yes	Yes	No	No	No
Leslie Mann	Yes	No	Yes	No	Yes	No	Yes	Yes	No	Yes
Craig Robinson	No	No	No	Yes	Yes	Yes	No	No	Yes	No
Seth Rogen	Yes	Yes	Yes	No	Yes	Yes	Yes	No	Yes	No
Paul Rudd	No	No	Yes	Yes	Yes	No	No	Yes	Yes	No
Jason Schwartzman	Yes	No	No	Yes	No	No	Yes	No	No	No
Jason Segel	Yes	Yes	No	No	Yes	No	No	Yes	Yes	No
Martin Starr	Yes	Yes	No	Yes	Yes	No	No	No	Yes	No
Loudon Wainwright III	No	Yes	Yes	No	Yes	No	No	No	No	No

== Bibliography ==
- (2010) I Found This Funny: My Favorite Pieces of Humor and Some That May Not Be Funny at All. San Francisco: McSweeney's. ISBN 978-1934781906.
- (2015) Sick in the Head: Conversations About Life and Comedy. New York: Random House. ISBN 978-0812997576.
- (2022) Sicker in the Head: More Conversations About Life and Comedy. New York: Random House. ISBN 978-0525509417.
- (2025) Comedy Nerd: A Lifelong Obsession in Stories and Pictures. Random House. ISBN 978-0593595930
