= The 40-Year-Old Virgin =

2005 film directed by Judd Apatow

- Theatrical release poster
- Directed by: Judd Apatow
- Written by: Steve Carell; Judd Apatow
- Produced by: Judd Apatow; Clayton Townsend; Shauna Robertson
- Starring: Steve Carell; Catherine Keener; Paul Rudd
- Cinematography: Jack N. Green
- Edited by: Brent White
- Music by: Lyle Workman
- Production company: Apatow Productions
- Distributed by: Universal Pictures
- Release date: August 19, 2005 (United States)
- Running time: 116 minutes 133 minutes (unrated)
- Country: United States
- Language: English
- Budget: $26 million
- Box office: $177.4 million

The 40-Year-Old Virgin is a 2005 American romantic sex comedy film directed by Judd Apatow (in his feature directorial debut), who produced the film with Clayton Townsend and Shauna Robertson. It features Steve Carell as the titular 40-year-old virgin Andy, an employee at an electronics store. Paul Rudd, Romany Malco, and Seth Rogen play co-workers who resolve to help him lose his virginity, and Catherine Keener stars as Andy's love interest, Trish.

Watching Carell's performance in Anchorman: The Legend of Ron Burgundy (2004) inspired Apatow to cast him in the lead role for the film, and they wrote The 40-Year-Old Virgin together. It was based on a sketch Carell created with The Second City, in which a 40-year-old man hides a secret. Filming took place in L.A. and The Valley, from January to April 2005.

The film was released theatrically in the United States on August 19, 2005, by Universal Pictures, and grossed over $177 million worldwide on a $26 million budget. Critical reviews were generally positive, with praise for Carell's performance and the film's humor, which was a point of contention by some conservative commentators as well. He won accolades from the Golden Schmoes Awards and MTV Movie & TV Awards for his role, while Keener received awards from the Boston Society of Film Critics (BSFC) and the Los Angeles Film Critics Association (LAFCA). The 40-Year-Old Virgin was named by the AFI one of 2005's Top 10 Films.

== Plot ==
Andy Stitzer is a shy 40-year-old introvert who works as a stock supervisor at the electronics store Smart Tech. He gave up trying to have sex after various failed attempts and lives alone in an apartment with a collection of action figures and video games. When a conversation at a poker game with his co-workers, David, Jay, and Cal, turns to past sexual exploits, they figure out that he secretly is still a virgin.

Andy is mortified upon discovering the next day that everyone else at work has learned about the secret, including their boss Paula, who is attracted to him and later privately offers to take his virginity. He almost quits work in humiliation before David consoles him and recommends trying again to have sex. David, Jay, and Cal become determined to help Andy achieve this. They all give differing advice on how to interact with women.

David invites him to join them for a speed dating event and unsuccessfully tries to reconnect with his ex-girlfriend Amy there. Jay drags Andy to various social events, books a painful chest waxing appointment, and sets him up with a prostitute, which all end with embarrassing results. Cal advises Andy to be confident and to ask women questions instead of talking about himself. He practices this on a bookstore clerk named Beth, who quickly becomes intrigued by him. David gives Andy his pornography collection, encouraging him to masturbate.

Andy eventually gets a date with a customer named Trish Piedmont. At the end of their first date, they almost have sex, but are interrupted by her 16-year-old daughter, Marla. Trish suggests they postpone having sex, and Andy enthusiastically agrees; they decide to abstain until their 20th date. Their relationship flourishes over the following weeks. She encourages Andy's dream of starting a business and helps fund it by selling his collectibles. After Marla argues with Trish over wanting birth control, Andy takes her to a group information session at a sexual health clinic, where she is mocked for being a virgin. Andy admits his virginity to defend her, earning him Marla's respect.

Meanwhile, David suffers an emotional breakdown at work over his obsession with Amy, and takes a vow of celibacy. The breakdown prompts Paula to assign Andy his sales duties for the day, and she later promotes him to floor manager for his high sales quota. As Cal takes on Andy's previous role, he hires a woman named Bernadette to work at the store, hoping to match her with David so he can move on from Amy. After Jay's girlfriend, Jill, breaks up with him due to his infidelity, he concedes to Andy that sex can ruin a relationship. Following a reconciliation with Jill, Jay invites Andy and the others to a nightclub celebrating her pregnancy.

Trish tries to initiate sex with Andy on their 20th date and becomes upset when he resists. They argue, and Andy leaves to meet his friends at a nightclub. He gets drunk and leaves with Beth to have sex at her apartment. Cal gets David and Bernadette to hook up, while Marla convinces Trish to reconcile with Andy. At Beth's, Andy sobers up and decides to leave without having sex, just as his friends arrive and encourage him to go back to Trish.

Andy returns to his apartment to find Trish waiting for him. She has seen David's porn collection; he tries to explain, but she flees in alarm and disgust, fearing Andy may be a sexual deviant. While pursuing her on his bike, Andy collides with her car, flying through the side of a billboard truck. She rushes to his side, and Andy finally confesses that he is a virgin. Trish is relieved and accepting, and they profess their love for each other. They eventually marry in a lavish ceremony with everyone in attendance, having generated roughly $500,000 from the sales of his action figures to pay for it, before having sex for the first time. The film ends with a musical sequence where all the characters sing and dance to "Aquarius".

== Cast ==
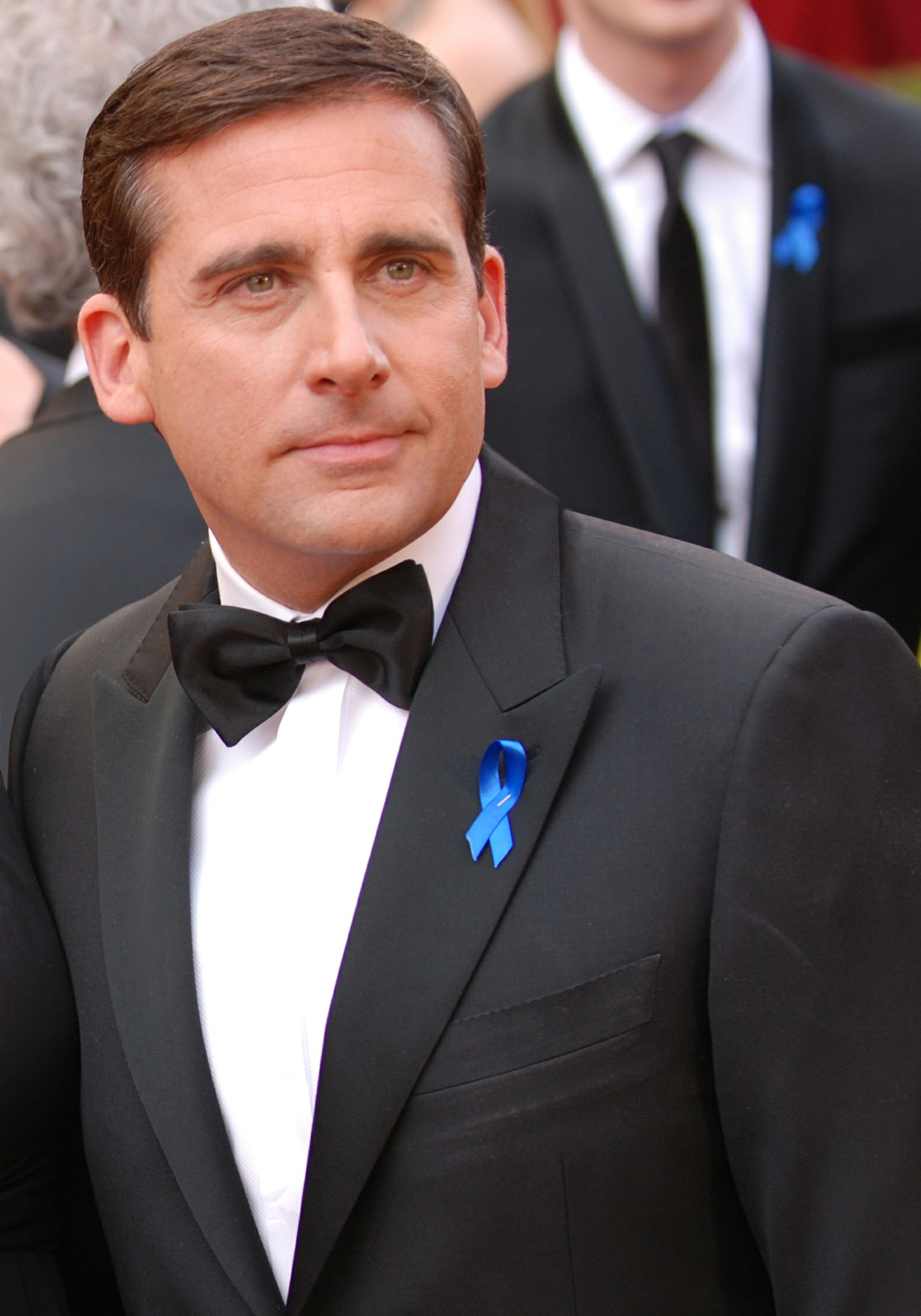
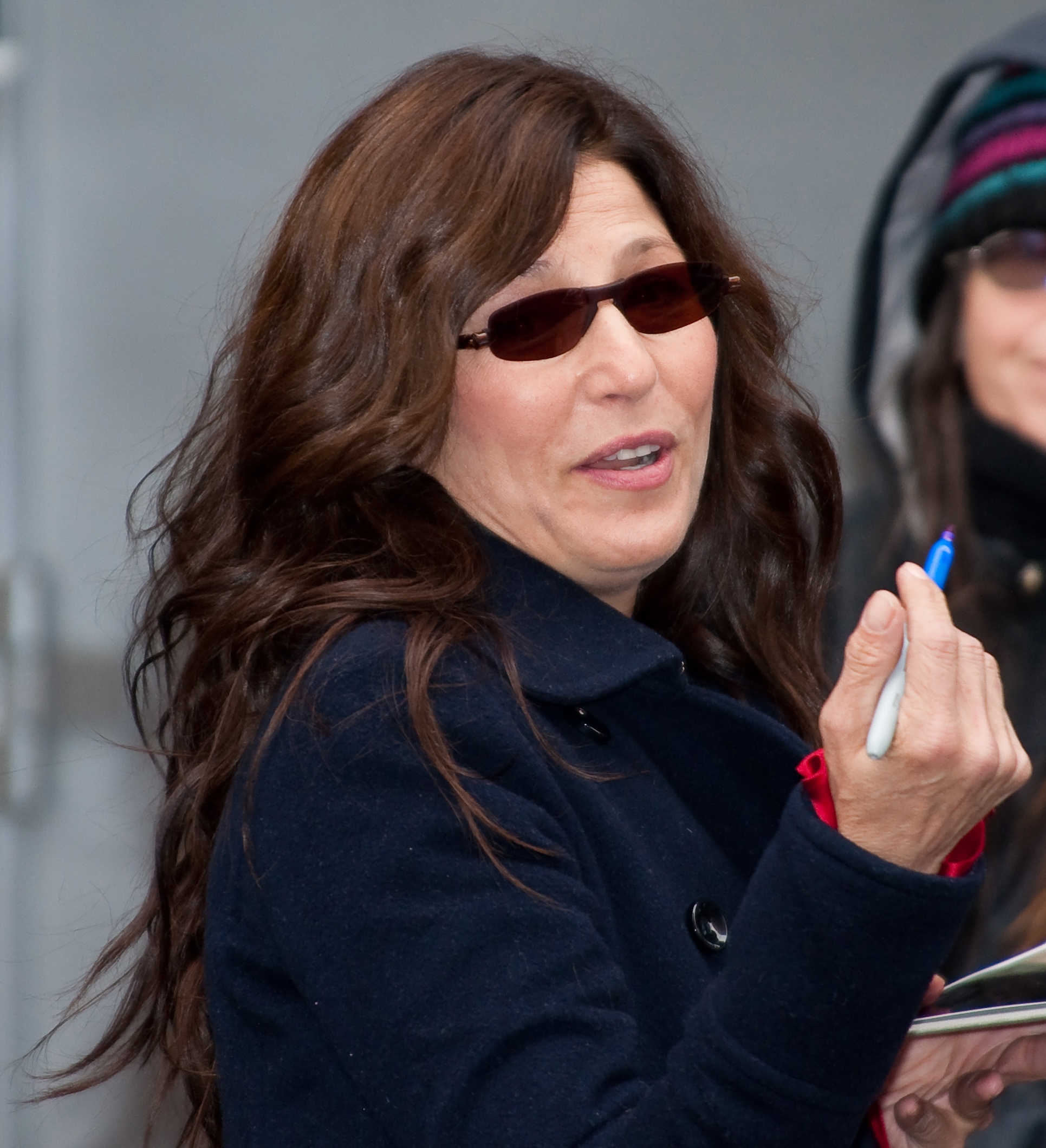
Steve Carell (left) and Catherine Keener (right) in 2010, who respectively play Andy and Trish
- Steve Carell as Andy Stitzer, a shy and introverted man who quit trying to have sex following missed opportunities before meeting Trish. Judd Apatow stated that "Andy Stitzer didn't have to be that weird. Everybody has some built-in performance anxiety, and for some people, it prevents them from taking risks, and they simply stop trying." He added that people would "always root for that person to prevail and find love".
- Catherine Keener as Trish Piedmont, the owner of a store that sells items on eBay. She has three daughters and one granddaughter prior to meeting Andy and starting a relationship with him. Keener was eager to take on the role as a change from her previous "strong dramatic performances leavened with wry comedy".
- Paul Rudd as David, a "lovelorn, self-destructive" character that Apatow and Carell specifically wrote with Rudd in mind to portray him.
- Romany Malco as Jay, a womanizer whom Malco called "probably the biggest" freak of the film because he "constantly runs around sleeping with all these women without ever making a real, quality connection with anyone".
- Seth Rogen as Cal, one of Andy's co-workers, who was written with Rogen in mind. Critic Scott Chitwood deemed him "the most adventurous of the group".
- Elizabeth Banks as Beth, a "sexually uninhibited" bookstore clerk who becomes intrigued with Andy. Banks said she "has some outrageous moments, and I realized that I had to prove to them early on in the audition process that I was willing to go that far once filming began".
- Leslie Mann as Nicky, a drunk woman whom Andy once tries to have sex with.
- Jane Lynch as Paula, the boss of David, Jay, Cal, and Andy, who offers to take the lattermost's virginity after learning that he has never had sex.

Other cast members include Kat Dennings as Marla Piedmont, Mindy Kaling as Amy, Gerry Bednob as Mooj, Marika Domińczyk as Bernadette, Shelley Malil as Haziz, Mo Collins as Gina, Kimberly Page, Gillian Vigman, and Siena Goines as women attending the speed dating event, Nancy Walls as the health clinic counselor, Cedric Yarbrough, David Koechner, and Jeff Kahn as fathers attending the health clinic, Loren Berman, Nick Lashaway, and Julian Foster as boys attending the health clinic, Chelsea Smith as Julia, Erica Vittina Phillips as Jill, Jonah Hill as a customer at Trish's store, Jordan Masterson as Mark, Jazzmun as a prostitute, Miki Mia as the waxing lady, Denise Meyerson as Robin, Michael Bierman as a 16-year-old version of Andy, Lee Weaver as Joe, Kevin Hart, Wayne Federman, Ron Marasco, and Joseph T. Mastrolia as Smart Tech customers, Kate Luyben as a woman who purchases videotapes, Stormy Daniels as a porn star, Shannon Bradley, Brianna Brown, Elizabeth Carey, Elizabeth DeCicco, Hilary Shepard, and Barret Swatek as bar girls, Carla Gallo as a girl who sucks on toes, Laura Bottrell as a college girl, Joe Nunez as a man who buffs floors, Charlie Hartsock as the speed dating MC, Gloria Helena Jones as Sara, Marisa Guterman as a girl wearing braces, Matthew McKane as a motorist, Miyoko Shimosawa as a waitress, Rose Abdoo, Steve Bannos, and Brooke Hamlin as restaurant customers, Marilyn Dodds Frank as a woman who buys a television, and Loudon Wainwright III as a priest.

== Production ==
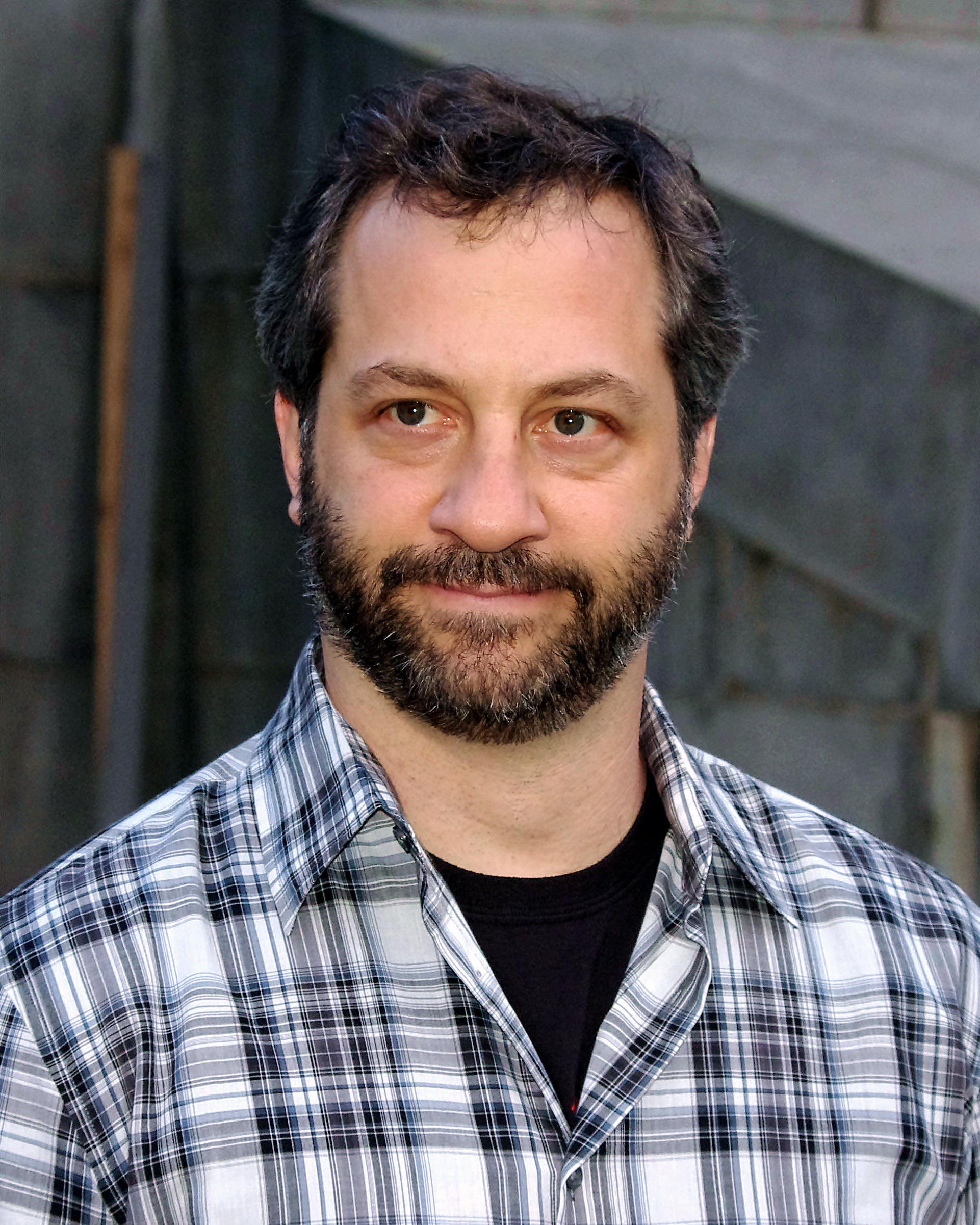
The 40-Year-Old Virgin was directed by Judd Apatow (pictured in 2012), who co-wrote it with Steve Carell.

The 40-Year-Old Virgin was Judd Apatow's directorial debut. While serving as a producer for the 2004 film Anchorman: The Legend of Ron Burgundy, he got the idea to make a film with Steve Carell in the lead role after watching his performance in that film, thinking, "It would be great to see a Steve Carell movie." Apatow later asked him whether he had any movie ideas, and both men wrote The 40-Year-Old Virgin together after the latter expressed desires to make something about a virgin who was aged 40, basing it off a sketch Carell created while performing with the improv comedy troupe The Second City. Carell did many versions of the sketch, trying out different scenarios where the 40-year-old man is hiding a "big secret". They began writing the movie in 2004. Apatow had difficulty coming up with the ending for the film. Garry Shandling suggested it was important to show that Andy was having better sex because he was in love, and instead of directly showing the sex they decided to have Andy sing and have a musical number.

Apatow began casting the film early in development and tailored the script to the actors' strengths. He also produced it for Apatow Productions and Universal Pictures along with Clayton Townsend and Shauna Robertson. Catherine Keener was the first choice for the female lead. Apatow specifically cast Stormy Daniels because he wanted "someone who's really, really comfortable" doing nude scenes that were required for the film's plot. A large portion of the dialogue in The 40-Year-Old Virgin was improvised. Keener stated in 2010 that Apatow "never really would even say cut" and instead would say "reload" when burning through film due to the improvisation, calling the experience "hysterically funny". She also mentioned "you had to kind of lose sense of being self-conscious on that movie because it was sort of an all-in in terms of throwing a joke out or even the writer would sit behind the monitors behind the curtain". Jane Lynch's character Paula was originally planned to be male before her audition. Nancy Walls recommended Lynch for the role after asking Apatow "You've got all these guys in your film. Why don't you read Jane for store manager?" He reworked the script for Lynch after her first audition. The production used over a million feet of film, a milestone reached on the last day of filming and celebrated with free champagne from Technicolor SA.

Filming began on January 17, 2005, and wrapped on April 1, 2005. The movie was shot in parts of California, including Studio City, Los Angeles, and San Fernando Valley's Ventura Boulevard. Lyle Workman composed the film's score while Jack N. Green and Brent White respectively served as its cinematographer and editor. Production was halted by Universal Pictures after the first week, due to concerns that the physical appearance of Carell's character resembled that of a serial killer, and that the early footage was not funny. Paul Rudd was criticized for being overweight and the studio was unhappy with how Apatow treated the project like an independent film. Apatow initially had a supporting role in mind for Jason Segel that Universal refused to allow. Because of the accidental deaths of fish used in The 40-Year-Old Virgin, the American Humane Association withheld its "no animals were harmed..." disclaimer.

Seven test screenings were held for the film prior to its release in theaters, with each costing approximately $10,000. It was initially considered "uncomfortably dirty, and not all that funny" before Apatow reduced the amount of pornography shown. Malco once pleaded for him to cut his scenes, fearing what would happen following its release and insisting: "My mom is an ordained minister, bro, cut me out of the movie, please. I'm serious." This request was declined because Apatow found Malco funny. He was surprised to find out his mother ended up taking "all of her church friends to see it, multiple times", and stated The 40-Year-Old Virgin "changed my career" by leading to more subsequent job offers without prior auditions. Jay was initially conceived as "a preppy, fraternity boy" before Malco's audition prompted him to be reworked into a "streetwise, trash-talking womanizer". He liked how the character "actually learns his own life lessons along with Andy" and called him the main character's "sexual antithesis". Kevin Hart had previously auditioned for the role, which Apatow did not feel suited him, thinking they "needed someone who was more of a lothario" and was not convinced he "looked like someone who would get more women than Romany Malco". This led to Hart being cast as a customer instead.

Carell's chest was genuinely waxed for the film, with five cameras set up to capture the scene in one take. He insisted on having an actual wax, telling Apatow: "It won't be as funny if it's mocked up or if it's a special effect. You have to see that this is really happening." Malco began to feel sick while watching the waxing and ran away from the set. According to Miki Mia, it took three or four hours to shoot the scene, and she requested that some of the chest hair be trimmed in advance to reduce Carell's pain. Mia noted that only "a tiny bit" was removed, so that it'll look great on camera. His chest was never fully waxed during the filming, and he shaved off all the hair after three weeks. Kelly Clarkson told Rogen in 2021 that Andy blurting out her name while he was being waxed would be "literally the one thing people know me from" regardless of anything else she did. Rogen explained he came up with this idea while seeing her on TV as he was compiling a list of "clean jokes" and "dirty jokes" to use in the scene.

== Release ==
On August 19, 2005, The 40-Year-Old Virgin premiered in theaters in the US. The film opened atop the North American box office, grossing $21,422,815 during the opening weekend, and stayed at number one the following weekend. It grossed $109,449,237 in this market and $67,929,408 internationally, for a total of $177,378,645 against a $26 million budget. The film was 25th worldwide and 19th in the US that year. It was released in the UK on September 2, 2005, and topped the nation's box office that weekend. Later that month, the film premiered in Germany, Greece, New Zealand, and Russia with respective openings of $2,195,972, $202,400, $144,666, and $443,428. Elsewhere, it opened with $66,277 in Argentina, $1,608,724 within Australia, $5,451 from Bulgaria, $25,200 in the Czech Republic, $29,884 within Lebanon, $310,280 from the Netherlands, $119,930 in Norway, $133,509 within Poland, $9,091 from Slovakia, $87,535 in South Africa, and $157,386 within Turkey. Upon its release in Spain, South Korea, Taiwan, and Thailand, The 40-Year-Old Virgin also had first-weekend grosses of $874,373, $240,882, $78,099, and $72,800, respectively.

On December 5, 2005, the film was released on DVD and VHS in the UK. On December 11, 2005, a 133-minute version of the film was released on DVD under the "unrated" banner, 17 minutes longer than the version shown in theaters. This additional footage consists of more nudity, Andy asking Viagra for help on how to get rid of an erection, another scene featuring a "bad encounter" from his younger days, fantasies of a porn star, and Jay having "a lot more amusing racial banter" with Mooj. A 2008 Blu-ray distribution includes the same extended cut along with its theatrical version. For the 100th Anniversary of Universal Pictures, both editions were re-released onto DVD on January 10, 2012. This version also had a similar banner of "unrated".

== Reception ==
=== Initial critical response ===
With an approval rating of 84% at the end of 2005, Rotten Tomatoes ranked The 40-Year-Old Virgin as the year's "Best Reviewed Comedy" and added it "proves that Steve Carell has the comedic chops to carry a movie and provide a good share of laughs". Ebert and Roeper gave the film a "two thumbs up" rating. Roger Ebert said, "I was surprised by how funny, how sweet, and how wise the movie really is" and "the more you think about it, the better The 40-Year-Old Virgin gets." The pair gave minor criticisms, with Ebert describing "the way she (Catherine Keener as 'Trish') empathizes with Andy" as "almost too sweet to be funny" and Richard Roeper saying that the film was too long, and at times extremely frustrating. Roeper later chose the movie as the tenth best of 2005.

The A.V. Club reviewer Nathan Rabin felt Carell made "a surprisingly graceful transition to a leading-man role" following his performance in Anchorman, and said both of them worked well due to the "chemistry and comic chops" of their casts. He concluded by praising Carell for instilling "a good deal of complexity and sophistication into his affectionate characterization" and believed it compensated for a perceived lack of humor in the romance. Owen Gleiberman of Entertainment Weekly gave the movie an A−, saying that Carell portrays Andy "in the most surprising way possible: as a credible human being". Manohla Dargis of The New York Times called the film a "charmingly bent comedy", adding that Carell was an essential component for "making this film work as well as it does".

Emanuel Levy gave the film a B+ grade, calling it an R-rated comedy superior to Wedding Crashers that has "a generous heart and a sweet, almost naive center" despite the profanity. While Brian Lowry of Variety believed The 40-Year-Old Virgin was slightly too long and "indulges in some juvenile excesses", he also felt it often provoked laughs even when "sophomorically homophobic". Rating the movie 3 1/2 stars, The Baltimore Sun critic Chris Kaltenbach opened with "People see the name of this movie and get defensive. What's wrong with being a virgin? They ask. Absolutely nothing, and that's part of the point of The 40-Year-Old Virgin, probably the sweetest sex comedy ever made. It's pretty funny, too." He went on to call the lead character "endearing" and "a marvelous comic invention".

Ann Hornaday of The Washington Post is critical of the film, but praised Carell for his performance. She wrote Andy remaining "steadfastly chaste and genuinely humane" was its most surprising aspect and described him as a character "of old-fashioned decency in a movie that otherwise flouts it at every turn". It was condemned by Harry Forbes of Catholic News Service as "relentlessly vulgar and frequently offensive", and by political columnist Cal Thomas for being an example of societal decline in regard to "self-control or what was once known as purity".

=== Retrospective commentary ===
On Rotten Tomatoes, the film has an approval rating of 85% based on 188 reviews, with an average rating of 7.20/10. The site's critical consensus reads, "Steve Carell's first star turn scores big with a tender treatment of its titular underdog, using raunchy but realistically funny comedy to connect with adult audiences." On Metacritic, the film has a score of 73 out of 100 based on 35 critics, indicating "generally favorable reviews". Audiences polled by CinemaScore gave the film an average grade of "A−" on an A+ to F scale.

For the film's tenth anniversary, Erik Abriss from Complex and Josh Wigler of MTV News both wrote pieces asserting it remained enjoyable. The former called this "the best romantic comedy of the 2000s" as well as "the most influential" for shifting "the comedic zeitgeist from inane to intellectual, from screwball to sensitive, from hyper-masculine to hilariously honest" while the latter compiled a list of reasons it "Still Cracks You Up 10 Years Later", with the first being how the film "marked the beginning of a modern comedy age". Writing for The Atlantic on the same day, Megan Garber felt The 40-Year-Old Virgin "holds up" and might have become better over time. She wrote that the movie "launched (almost) a thousand bromantic comedies", put Apatow "on the mainstream map", and made him a "Hollywood king (and, much more interestingly, queen)-maker". Garber added it raises questions on how people become adults and established how "whatever makes an adult now, it isn't, in general, the thing that has defined adulthood for so much of human history: the having of sex." Chris Serico of Today said this "has continued to resonate among comedy fans, and served as a breakthrough movie for its director, Judd Apatow, and his co-writer/star, Steve Carell" a decade after being released. He went on to praise Carell's performance, stating that it "took his career and the movie to the next level".

A 2018 article from Detroit Free Press contributor Julie Hinds noted that The 40-Year-Old Virgin was "Michigan's favorite romantic comedy", and called that ranking "a fine choice" when "Carell's character has a heart of gold" and "eventually lands in a solid, committed relationship". 15 years after the film's premiere, NME writer Beth Webb praised its use of "a mature virgin" for a protagonist who does not feel sex-starved. She called that aspect "a milestone" for "cinema's muddled relationship with virginity, in which women have since taken control of their virtue on screen, while men remain largely underrepresented" and declared the movie as a whole to be "a milestone for sex-positive cinema". During December 2021, members of Writers Guild of America West (WGAW) and Writers Guild of America, East (WGAE) voted the film's screenplay 94th in its "101 Greatest Screenplays of the 21st Century (*so far)". In July 2025, it was ranked at number 62 on Rolling Stone's list of "The 100 Best Movies of the 21st Century." When celebrating the movie's 20th anniversary the next month, Jake Kring-Schreifels of The Ringer said The 40-Year-Old Virgin "kicked off a golden age of raunchy bro comedies". He also called the film "a deeply funny and earnest exploration of American masculinity".

=== Accolades ===
Award	Date of ceremony	Category	Nominee(s)	Result	Ref(s)
American Film Institute Awards	2005	Top 10 Films of the Year	The 40-Year-Old Virgin	Won	
Boston Society of Film Critics Awards	December 11, 2005	Best Supporting Actress	Catherine Keener	Won	
Critics Choice Association	January 9, 2006	Best Comedy Movie	The 40-Year-Old Virgin	Won	
Golden Schmoes Awards	2005	Best Comedy of the Year	The 40-Year-Old Virgin	Won	
Golden Schmoes Awards	2005	Best Screenplay of the Year	The 40-Year-Old Virgin	Nominated	
Golden Schmoes Awards	2005	Best Surprise of the Year	The 40-Year-Old Virgin	Won	
Golden Schmoes Awards	2005	Favorite Movie Poster of the Year	The 40-Year-Old Virgin	Nominated	
Golden Schmoes Awards	2005	Best Breakthrough Performance of the Year	Steve Carell	Won	
Golden Schmoes Awards	2005	Best Line of the Year	"You know how I know you're gay?"	Won	
Golden Schmoes Awards	2005	Most Memorable Scene in a Movie	Chest waxing scene	Nominated	
Los Angeles Film Critics Association Awards	December 2005	Best Supporting Actress	Catherine Keener	Won	
MTV Movie & TV Awards	June 8, 2006	Best Movie	The 40-Year-Old Virgin	Nominated	
MTV Movie & TV Awards	June 8, 2006	Best Breakthrough Performance	Romany Malco	Nominated	
MTV Movie & TV Awards	June 8, 2006	Best Male Performance	Steve Carell	Nominated	
MTV Movie & TV Awards	June 8, 2006	Best Comedic Performance	Steve Carell	Won	
MTV Movie & TV Awards	June 8, 2006	Best On-Screen Team	Steve Carell, Paul Rudd, Seth Rogen, Romany Malco	Nominated	
National Society of Film Critics Awards	January 8, 2006	Best Supporting Actress	Catherine Keener	Nominated	
New York Film Critics Circle	January 8, 2006	Best Supporting Actress	Catherine Keener	Nominated	
Writers Guild of America, East	February 4, 2006	Best Original Screenplay	Judd Apatow, Steve Carell	Nominated	
