= George Craig (musician) =

English singer (born 1990)

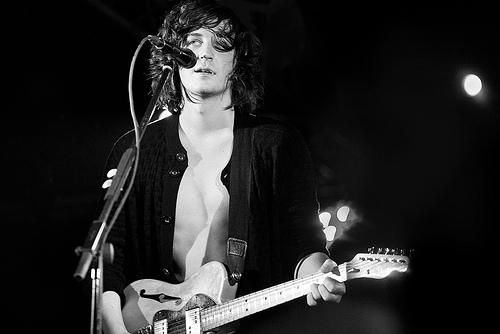
- Craig in 2012

Background information
- Born: 11 July 1990 (age 36); Essex, United Kingdom
- Origin: Helmsley, North Yorkshire
- Occupations: Musician, singer-songwriter, model
- Years active: 2003–present

George Craig (born 11 July 1990) is an English musician and singer. He is the lead singer of the British band One Night Only.

== Music ==
The band had their first top ten hit with "Just For Tonight" in 2008 and shortly after released their first album, Started a Fire. The next single off the album was "It's About Time", which peaked in the UK Singles Chart at number 37 and remained in the chart for one week. July 2008 saw the re-release of "You and Me" which failed to reach the top 40.

The band then took time off to record, during this time they announced the departure of their drummer Sam Ford and that his replacement would be George's brother James. In May 2010, One Night Only released their first single off their second album, "Say You Don't Want It". The video featured Emma Watson, after they met on a Burberry campaign photoshoot, and was shot in New York. The band released their second album One Night Only, in the summer of 2010.

One Night Only then released "Can You Feel It?" as part of a Coca-Cola campaign in 2011. It was used in Coca-Cola's TV adverts worldwide. On 4 May 2012, the band released their single "Long Time Coming" alongside Burberry as part of their Eyewear Campaign.

In 2015, he released the single "Perfect Wave", a duet with Diana Vickers written by him, as part of the soundtrack for the 2014 movie The Perfect Wave, starring Vickers.

== Modelling and other work ==
Craig first modelled for Burberry in 2008 in their Spring/Summer campaign. He also appeared alongside Emma Watson in the 2010 Burberry Spring/Summer Campaign and was also involved in Burberry's Eyewear Campaign in 2012. He later modelled for Urban Outfitters. In 2014 and 2015, he modelled for Joshua Kane, starring in the campaign (partly with Diana Vickers) and on the runway shows.

In 2016, he released a cook book "Feeding friends" (renamed "Cooking for friends" in the USA) with Terry Edwards, with whom he had formed the culinary duo Terry & George.

He used to manage other rock bands such as Hello Operator and also Counterfeit, where his brother James, drummer of One Night Only, is also the drummer.

Since 2016, he owns Jimmy's, a music venue and bar in the Northern Quarter of Manchester, with his brother James. They have also opened a venue in Liverpool City Centre.

== Personal life ==
He was born in Essex to Louise and Richard Craig and has one older brother. He moved to Helmsley at the age of five and is a fan of Man City. He moved to London at the start of 2011 and lived with his bandmates Mark and Dan (guitar player and bassist of One Night Only). He currently lives in Helmsley with his wife, blogger Megan Ellaby and their 3 children Goldie Rae Craig (born on 11 February 2021), Gene August and Marnie Bloom.
