= Widows (2018 film) =

2018 heist film directed by Steve McQueen

- Theatrical release poster
- Directed by: Steve McQueen
- Screenplay by: Gillian Flynn; Steve McQueen
- Based on: Widows by Lynda La Plante
- Produced by: Steve McQueen; Iain Canning; Emile Sherman; Arnon Milchan
- Starring: Viola Davis; Michelle Rodriguez; Elizabeth Debicki; Cynthia Erivo; Colin Farrell; Brian Tyree Henry; Daniel Kaluuya; Jacki Weaver; Carrie Coon; Robert Duvall; Liam Neeson
- Cinematography: Sean Bobbitt
- Edited by: Joe Walker
- Music by: Hans Zimmer
- Production companies: Regency Enterprises; New Regency; See-Saw Films; Lammas Park
- Distributed by: 20th Century Fox
- Release dates: September 8, 2018 (TIFF); November 6, 2018 (United Kingdom); November 16, 2018 (United States)
- Running time: 130 minutes
- Countries: United Kingdom; United States
- Language: English
- Budget: $42 million
- Box office: $76 million

Widows is a 2018 neo-noir heist thriller film directed by Sir Steve Rodney McQueen from a screenplay by Gillian Flynn and McQueen, based upon the 1983 British television series of the same name. The plot follows four Chicago women who attempt to steal $5 million from the home of a prominent local politician in order to pay back a crime boss missing money stolen by the women's husbands before they were killed in a botched getaway attempt. A British-American co-production, the film stars Viola Davis, Michelle Rodriguez and Elizabeth Debicki in the title roles alongside Cynthia Erivo (in her film debut), Colin Farrell, Brian Tyree Henry, Daniel Kaluuya, Jacki Weaver, Carrie Coon, Robert Duvall, and Liam Neeson in an ensemble supporting cast.

Widows premiered at the Toronto International Film Festival on September 8, 2018, and was theatrically released in the United Kingdom on November 6, 2018, and in the United States on November 16, by 20th Century Fox. The film received critical acclaim, with praise aimed at its direction, editing, screenplay and performances (particularly Davis, Debicki and Kaluuya), with critics crediting it for blending "dramatic themes with popcorn thrills". The film grossed $76 million worldwide on a production budget of $42 million and received several award nominations, among them being one for Davis for the BAFTA Award for Best Actress in a Leading Role.

== Plot ==
In Chicago, Harry Rawlings and his criminal gang's getaway van is blown up during a police standoff after stealing $2 million from crime boss Jamal Manning. Jamal threatens Veronica, Harry's widow, demanding compensation, needing the money to finance his campaign for alderman of a South Side ward. He is running against Jack Mulligan, the next-in-line of a dynastic family that has held the position for decades. Mulligan doesn't like politics, but is happy to profit from it; his father Tom, the previous alderman, warns him that he will face everlasting shame if he loses to Jamal.

Veronica is given a key to a safety deposit box by Bash, Harry's loyal chauffeur, which contains Harry's notebook with a detailed plan for stealing $5 million from Mulligan's home. She is advised to sell the notebook to Jamal's people, but decides against it.

Veronica decides to carry out the heist, recruiting two of the other widows of Harry's gang, Alice and Linda. Alice has lost her livelihood and is pressured by her mother to become a sugar baby. Linda has lost her store, as her husband secretly gambled away the rent payments. The fourth widow, Amanda, does not join them, as Veronica discovers she has a 4-month-old baby. Alice acquires guns and a getaway van while Linda deciphers Harry's blueprints. Jamal's brother and right-hand man Jatemme attacks several witnesses and kills Bash while looking for Harry's notebook. Eventually, Alice uses a real estate executive, her sugar daddy, to identify the blueprint as the safe room in the Mulligan family mansion which also serves as Jack Mulligan's campaign headquarters.

Linda recruits Belle, her babysitter, to be the group's driver. Veronica visits Amanda and notices Harry's flask in the home, which raises the question of what Harry's involvement with Amanda — and the baby — is. Her suspicion is confirmed when her dog paws vigorously at a closet door, indicating she is very familiar with the person behind it — revealed to be Harry after Veronica storms off without a confrontation. It is revealed that Harry double-crossed his crew by deliberately blowing up their getaway van and is in league with Mulligan to ruin Jamal's campaign. Returning home, Veronica opens the door to her son Marcus's room and relives the memory of his death: while on the phone with Harry, he was shot by police officers after being pulled over while driving. Veronica visits the Mulligan mansion under the guise of asking Jack for protection from the Mannings, and is able to case the premises while Belle scans the outdoor security.

Veronica blackmails the CEO of the Mulligans' security company for the safe code, using incriminating photos left in Harry's notebook. The heist begins with Belle creating a disturbance down the street to draw the outside security detail away. Veronica and the others stun the security guard inside and intimidate Tom Mulligan's careperson. Veronica, Linda, and Alice reach the safe and retrieve the money. Tom Mulligan appears from his bedroom, unmasks Veronica and wounds Alice with a gunshot; Linda fatally shoots him.

The women escape, but Jatemme appears, holds Belle at gunpoint and flees in their van with the money; they follow him in a separate car and ram him from behind, causing him to crash and killing him. They retrieve the money, then get Alice to the hospital. Veronica returns alone to their hideout, where Harry arrives to steal the money, needing $1 million of it to keep Mulligan quiet about his faked death. Harry claims that after the death of their son and subsequent disintegration of their marriage, he wanted to start over with Amanda and their child. Harry retrieves the money in the van and turns to shoot Veronica – but Veronica kills him first, then plants on him the gun used to kill Tom Mulligan.

Mulligan wins the position of alderman due to a sympathy vote following his father's murder. Linda reacquires her store, Alice sets up her own business, and Belle moves away. Veronica donates a large sum to rebuild a school library on the condition that it be named after Marcus. Outside a diner, Veronica sees and warmly greets Alice.

== Cast ==
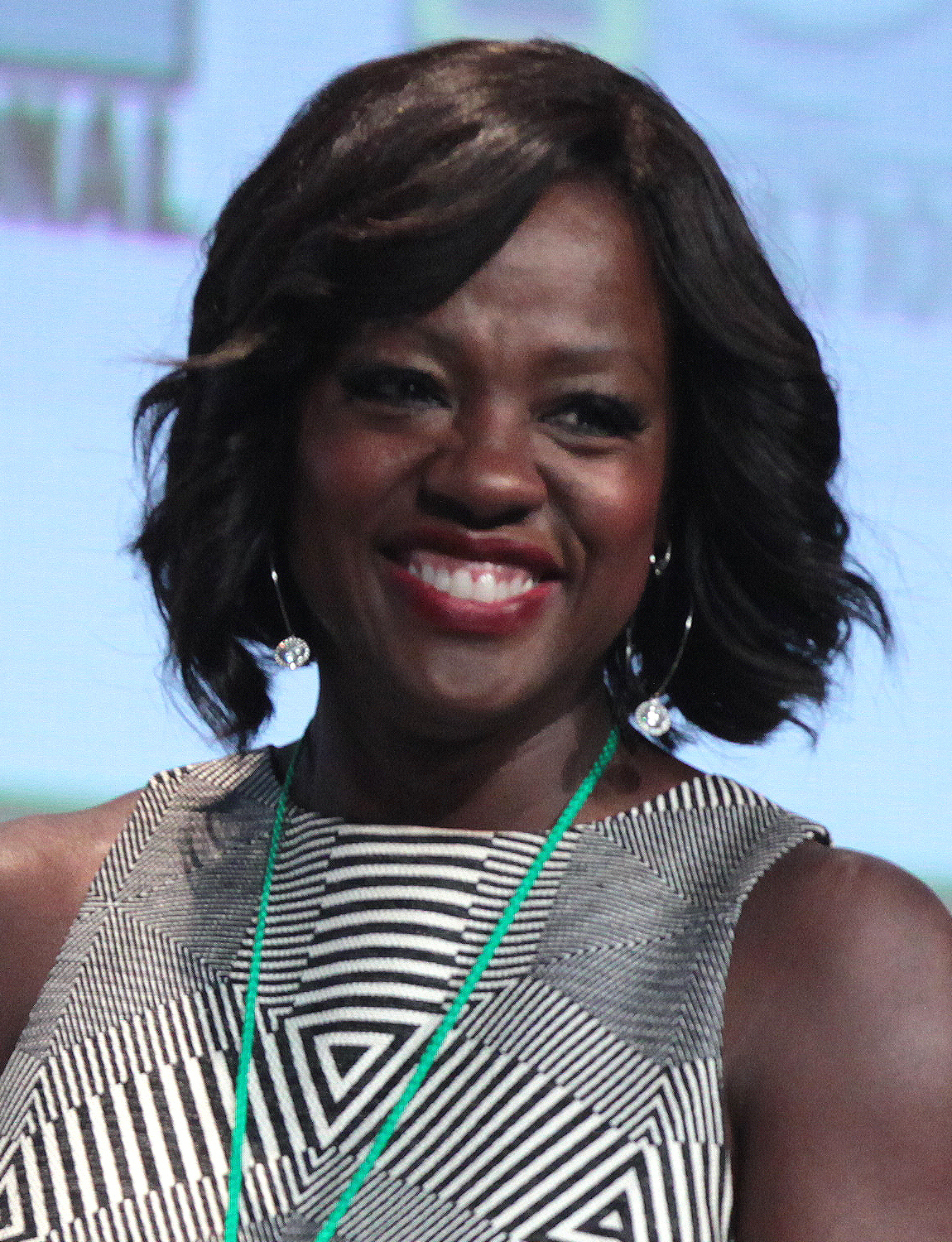
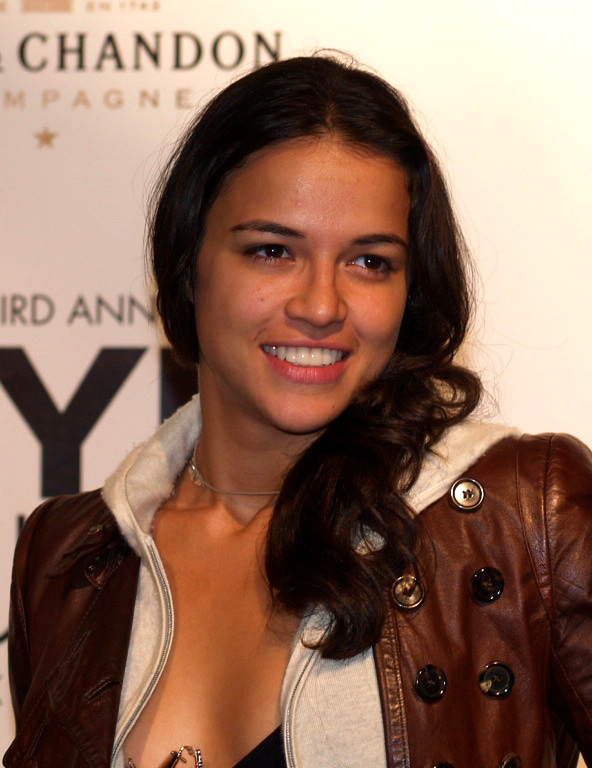
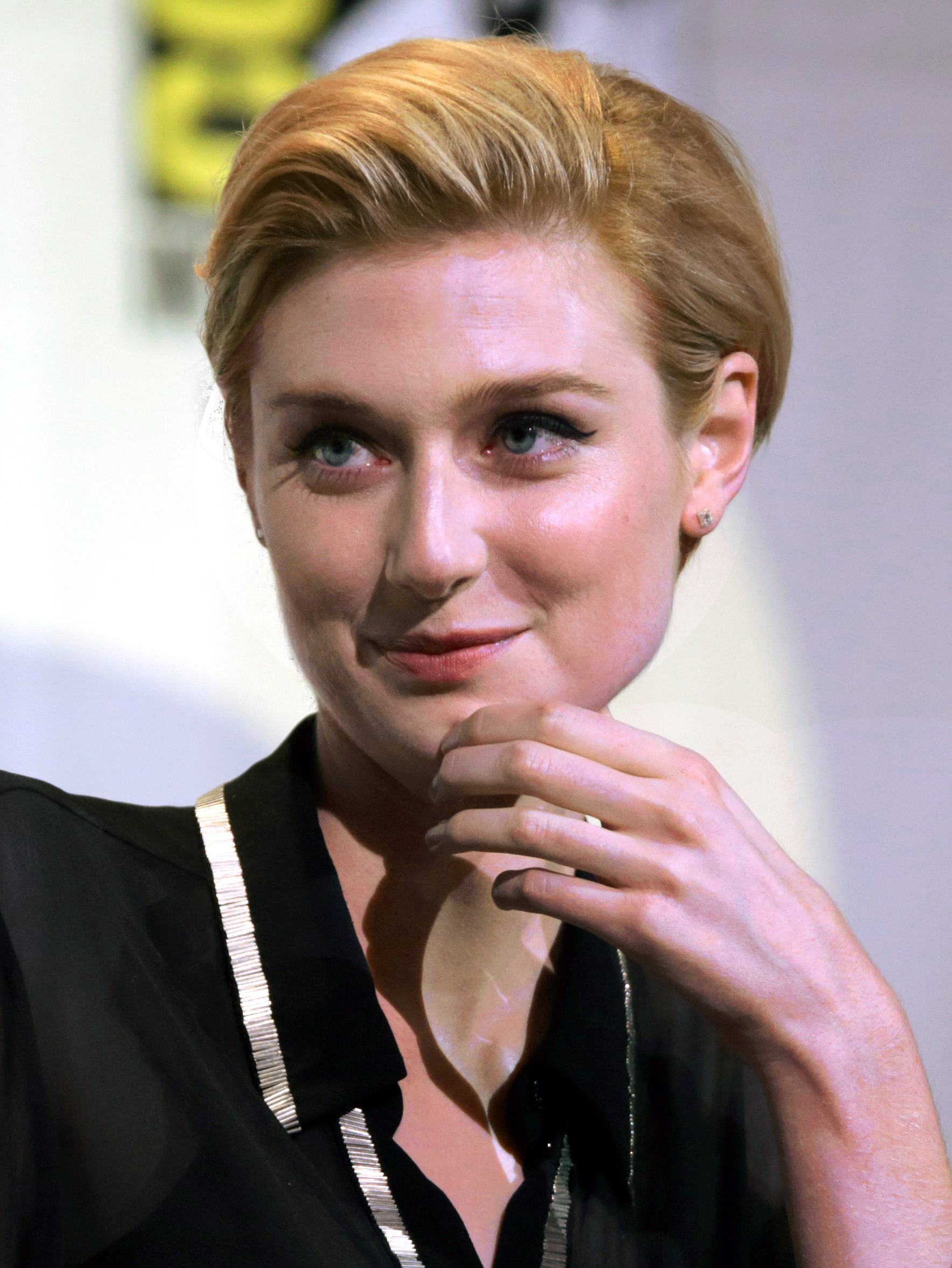
Viola Davis, Michelle Rodriguez, and Elizabeth Debicki star as the titular widows.
- Viola Davis as Veronica Rawlings, a Chicago teachers' union delegate and Harry's widow
- Michelle Rodriguez as Linda, a clothing store owner and Carlos's widow
- Elizabeth Debicki as Alice, Florek's widow, who becomes a sugar baby to support herself after her husband's death
- Cynthia Erivo as Belle, a babysitter and beautician who looks after Linda's children and works with Veronica's group
- Colin Farrell as Jack Mulligan, a politician who is mixed up in Veronica's plan
- Brian Tyree Henry as Jamal Manning, a crime boss and politician who believes Veronica is indebted to him
- Daniel Kaluuya as Jatemme Manning, Jamal's brother and mob enforcer
- Jacki Weaver as Agnieska, Alice's abusive mother
- Carrie Coon as Amanda, Jimmy's widow, who is not involved in Veronica's robbery scheme
- Robert Duvall as Tom Mulligan, Jack's father and a power broker at odds with his son
- Liam Neeson as Harry Rawlings, a renowned bank robber who was Veronica's loving husband
- Jon Bernthal as Florek, a member of Harry's gang who was Alice's abusive husband
- Manuel Garcia-Rulfo as Carlos, a member of Harry's gang who was Linda's gambler husband
- Garret Dillahunt as 'Bash' Babiak, Harry and Veronica's chauffeur
- Lukas Haas as David, a real estate developer with whom Alice develops a transactional sexual relationship following Florek's death
- Matt Walsh as Ken, the CEO of a security company
- Kevin J. O'Connor as Bobby Welsh, a disabled bowling alley worker who was formerly involved with Harry
- Jon Michael Hill as Reverend Wheeler
- Coburn Goss as Jimmy Nunn

== Production ==
=== Development and casting ===
The project was announced as being in development on March 27, 2015, with a script written by Gillian Flynn and Steve McQueen, and with McQueen attached to direct. In September 2016, Viola Davis joined the cast. It was reported that Jennifer Lawrence was approached for a role, but, due to scheduling conflicts, had to decline. In November 2016, Cynthia Erivo joined the cast. In January 2017, André Holland entered negotiations to co-star in the film, but does not appear in the finished product. The next month, Elizabeth Debicki was cast in the role Lawrence had declined, and Michelle Rodriguez and Daniel Kaluuya were also announced as cast members. In March, Liam Neeson joined the cast. The following month, Colin Farrell was added along with Robert Duvall. In May, Garret Dillahunt, Jacki Weaver, Manuel Garcia-Rulfo, Lukas Haas and Brian Tyree Henry were set to co-star, and in June, Carrie Coon was added. Michael Harney and Jon Bernthal joined the cast in August. The British actress Ann Mitchell, who had portrayed Dolly Rawlins in the television series, has a small part as Amanda's mother.

=== Filming ===
Principal photography began on May 8, 2017, in Chicago, Illinois.

=== Music ===
Hans Zimmer composed the film's score with additional music provided by Steve Mazzaro. The soundtrack, released by Milan Records, includes the score as well as songs by Nina Simone, and the Cool Kids, as well as a new song "The Big Unknown" by Sade later released as a single.

== Release ==
The film had its world premiere at the Toronto International Film Festival on September 8, 2018. It was released in the United States on November 16, 2018.

== Reception ==
=== Box office ===
Widows grossed $42.4 million in the United States and Canada, and $33.6 million in other territories, for a total worldwide gross of $76 million, against a production budget of $42 million.

In the United States and Canada, Widows was released alongside Fantastic Beasts: The Crimes of Grindelwald and Instant Family, and was projected to gross $12–18 million from 2,803 theaters in its opening weekend. It grossed $4.2 million on its first day, including $600,000 from Thursday night previews. It ended up making $12.3 million over the weekend, finishing fifth at the box office. Deadline Hollywood stated that the low debut was because of a "lack of urgency" in the advertising, and that the studio should not have relied on the good reviews alone to sell the film. Other publications, including Business Insider, said the film should have been released outside the busy November frame, and that the perceived marketing toward specifically African-American audiences, and its R-rating, limited the film's appeal. In its second weekend, the film dropped 33% to $8.2 million (and $10.5 million total over the five-day Thanksgiving frame), finishing eighth, and then made $4.4 million in its third weekend.

Discussing the box office and audience reception, star Cynthia Erivo said: "There's something that's super messy about Widows, which I loved. There's an expectation of a heist movie to be slick and tidy, and it just wasn't that. I think that was its charm, but I'm not sure that everyone quite understood that. But maybe we're getting to a place where people will."

Director Steve McQueen made a similar statement about the movie's reception: “People weren’t ready yet. They just weren’t ready.“ He added: “It’s all about timing because if I made that movie today it would be different and the people behind the machine would do something different.“

=== Critical response ===
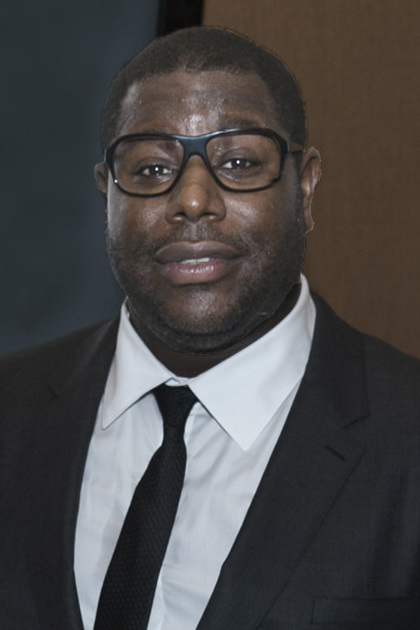
Steve McQueen received praise for his direction.

On review aggregator Rotten Tomatoes, the film holds an approval rating of 91% based on 420 reviews, with an average rating of 8.1/10. The website's critical consensus reads, "Widows rounds up a stellar ensemble for a heist thriller that mixes popcorn entertainment with a message – and marks another artistic leap for director Steve McQueen." On Metacritic, the film has a weighted average score of 84 out of 100, based on 57 critics, indicating "universal acclaim". Audiences polled by CinemaScore gave the film an average grade of "B" on an A+ to F scale, while PostTrak reported filmgoers gave it 3.5 out of 5 stars; social media monitor RelishMix noted online responses to the film were "mixed".

Owen Gleiberman of Variety praised McQueen's direction and Davis's performance and wrote, "The strongest aspect of Widows is the way the movie gets us — and keeps us — rooting for its desperate-living heroines. They're past the point of just wanting to have fun (the subtext of almost every heist movie); they're less concerned with comeuppance than sheer survival." Eric Kohn of IndieWire gave the film an "A−", saying the film "works as well as it does due to the way McQueen juggles substance with entertainment value to such eager subversive ends. The movie engages with topics as complex as sexism, police brutality, and interracial marriage, but it still delivers on the car chases and gunplay. No superhero movie digs this deep." Dirty Movies considered it one of the best films of 2018, describing it as McQueen's best work since Hunger. Representing more critical views, Leah Greenblatt at Entertainment Weekly gave the film a "C+", arguing that it's "not clear exactly what kind of movie(s) Widows wants to be" and that it feels like a "crazy-quilt patchwork of other, better films".

== Accolades ==
=== Top ten lists ===
Widows was listed on numerous critics' top ten lists for 2018, among them:

- 1st – Richard Roeper, Chicago Sun-Times
- 1st – David Sims, The Atlantic
- 2nd – Vinnie Mancuso, The Globe and Mail
- 3rd – Matthew Jacobs, The Huffington Post
- 3rd – Joshua Rothkopf, Time Out New York
- 4th – Tim Grierson, Screen Daily
- 5th – Brian Tallerico, RogerEbert.com
- 5th – Mark Olsen, Los Angeles Times
- 6th – Michael Phillips, Chicago Tribune
- 6th – Jason Guerrasio, Business Insider
- 6th – Kristen Lopez, RogerEbert.com
- 7th – Christopher Orr, The Atlantic
- 7th – Marlow Stern, The Daily Beast
- 8th – Jesse Hassenger, The A.V. Club
- 8th – Mara Reinstein, Us Weekly
- 8th – Carly Darling, Houston Chronicle
- 9th – Max Weiss, Baltimore Magazine
- 9th – Omer Mozaffar, RogerEbert.com
- 9th – Vinnie Mancuso, Collider
- 9th – Peter Bradshaw, The Guardian
- 10th – The Guardian
- 10th – Matt Singer, ScreenCrush
- Top 10 (listed alphabetically) – WIRED
- Top 10 (listed alphabetically) – Hal Boedeker, Orlando Sentinel
- Best of 2018 (listed alphabetically, not ranked), NPR

=== Awards and nominations ===
Organisation	Category	Recipient(s)	Result
BAFTA Awards	Best Actress in a Leading Role	Viola Davis	Nominated
Satellite Awards	Best Motion Picture – Drama	Widows	Nominated
Satellite Awards	Best Actress in a Motion Picture, Drama	Viola Davis	Nominated
Satellite Awards	Best Film Editing	Joe Walker	Nominated
Satellite Awards	Best Original Score	Hans Zimmer	Nominated
Chicago Film Critics Association	Best Supporting Actress	Elizabeth Debicki	Nominated
Chicago Film Critics Association	Best Editing	Joe Walker	Nominated
African-American Film Critics Association	Top 10 Films	Widows	Nominated
Black Reel Awards	Best Film	Widows	Nominated
Black Reel Awards	Best Director	Steve McQueen	Nominated
Black Reel Awards	Best Actress	Viola Davis	Nominated
Black Reel Awards	Best Supporting Actor	Daniel Kaluuya	Nominated
Black Reel Awards	Best Ensemble	Francine Maisler, Mickie Paskal & Jennifer Rudnicke	Nominated
Black Reel Awards	Best Screenplay, Adapted or Original	Steve McQueen & Gillian Flynn	Nominated
Black Reel Awards	Outstanding Cinematography	Sean Bobbitt	Nominated
Black Film Critics Circle	Best Actress	Viola Davis	Won
Broadcast Film Critics Association	Best Acting Ensemble	The cast of Widows	Nominated
Broadcast Film Critics Association	Best Action Movie	Widows	Nominated
Broadcast Film Critics Association	Best Editing	Joe Walker	Nominated
Dublin Film Critics Circle	Best Actress	Viola Davis	Nominated
IndieWire Critics Poll	Best Supporting Actress	Elizabeth Debicki	4th place
Las Vegas Film Critics Society	Best Ensemble	The cast of Widows	Nominated
London Film Critics' Circle	Supporting Actor of the Year	Daniel Kaluuya	Nominated
London Film Critics' Circle	Supporting Actress of the Year	Elizabeth Debicki	Nominated
London Film Critics' Circle	Screenwriter of the Year	Gillian Flynn	Nominated
London Film Critics' Circle	Screenwriter of the Year	Steve McQueen	Nominated
London Film Critics' Circle	British/Irish Actor of the Year	Daniel Kaluuya	Nominated
Los Angeles Film Critics Association	Best Supporting Actress	Elizabeth Debicki	Nominated
Los Angeles Online Film Critics Society	Best Supporting Actress	Elizabeth Debicki	Nominated
Los Angeles Online Film Critics Society	Best Action Movie	Widows	Nominated
Los Angeles Online Film Critics Society	Best Ensemble Cast	The cast of Widows	Nominated
National Society of Film Critics	Best Supporting Actress	Elizabeth Debicki	Nominated
National Society of Film Critics	Best Supporting Actor	Brian Tyree Henry	Nominated
North Carolina Film Critics Association	Best Supporting Actress	Elizabeth Debicki	Nominated
North Texas Film Critics Association	Best Actress	Viola Davis	4th place
North Texas Film Critics Association	Best Supporting Actress	Elizabeth Debicki	3rd place
Online Film Critics Society	Best Supporting Actress	Elizabeth Debicki	Nominated
Online Film Critics Society	Best Adapted Screenplay	Gillian Flynn	Nominated
Online Film Critics Society	Best Adapted Screenplay	Steve McQueen	Nominated
Online Film Critics Society	Best Editing	Joe Walker	Nominated

== See also ==
- List of black films of the 2010s
