= Scarlet Blade Theatre =

British theatre company

- Formation: 2007
- Type: Theatre Company
- Purpose: Specialising in acting, advanced stage combat, physical theatre, other performance skills including horse riding and martial arts
- Location: London
- Founding Members: Stephanie Cowton; Joe Golby; Richard Hay; Alex Keeling
- Other Members: Chris Hall; Lianne Bowley; Julen DeRetuerto
- Affiliations: East 15 Acting School
- Website: www.scarletblade.com

Scarlet Blade Theatre was a theatre company based in London, England, specialising in acting, advanced stage combat, physical theatre and other performance skills including horse riding and martial arts.

== History ==
The company formed in 2007, all members studied and trained together at East 15 Acting School, part of the first graduating year of the new, exclusive BA Honours Degree in ‘Acting & Stage Combat’.

They, along with eleven other students, directed by Dr Chris Main, performed a collection of fight scenes from Romeo and Juliet at the 2007 Sam Wanamaker Festival, Shakespeare's Globe. Other productions included The Odyssey, Julius Caesar and The Bay.

== Theatre ==
Productions devised and performed by Scarlet Blade Theatre.

The Jabberwock, a devised piece based on the nonsense poem by Lewis Carroll. It was performed at the 2008 Edinburgh Fringe Festival, C Venues. It received good reviews from The Scotsman and a "Critics Choice" award from the British Theatre Guide.

A Pirate's Life for Me, a Pirate Adventure show for children and adults; 'Following the adventures of a young boy on his quest to become a Pirate. Also performed at the 2008 Edinburgh Fringe Festival, C Venues. It was received well with a favorable review in The Stage, it was also listed as "Best of the Fest" in The Scotsman; one of only two listed children’s shows to achieve this in 2008.

In November 2008, ‘A Pirate’s Life for Me’ was taken to Warsaw, Poland, by Etc Media International. Performed at Studio Buffo; to children from schools across Poland, learning English as a second language. The company were made honorary members of The English Speaking Theatre Company of Poland.

== TV & Film ==
Scarlet Blade Theatre is not limited to live performance; company members have performed in Feature Film, Television & Video Games. Also providing services including Fight choreography, Workshops, Motion Capture & Green screen.

The company appears as part of the stunt team in the music video You and Me (One Night Only song), #1 indie chart hit for One Night Only (band). The video, featuring a large pub brawl, was produced by Agile Films, directed by Lucy Cash and fight directed by Tim Klotz.

Male members were also part of the stunt team in the Feature Film; Faintheart, under the fight direction of Richard Ryan, (FD: Troy, Stardust, The Dark Knight). The film was produced by Vertigo Films & Film4.

== Reviews ==
"Trained to the Hilt"

— Maria Hodson, The Stage,

"It brings a level of genuine excitement that is rare in dramatic theatre… which ought to be taken as a significant addition to the mythology."

— Graeme Strachan on The Jabberwock, British Theatre Guide,

"Brilliant"

— Deborah Meaden, Dragons' Den,

== See also ==
- Stage combat
- Stunt coordinator
