= Say You Don't Want It =

Single by One Night Only

from the album One Night Only
- Released: 25 June 2010
- Recorded: Early 2010
- Genre: Indie pop, post-punk revival
- Length: 3:37 (radio edit); 4:08 (album version)
- Label: Mercury
- Songwriters: George Craig, Jack Sails, Daniel Parkin, Sam Ford, Mark Hayton, Ed Buller.
- Producers: Ed Buller; Matt Terry

One Night Only singles chronology
"You and Me" (2008)	"Say You Don't Want It" (2010)

"Say You Don't Want It" is a song by English indie pop band One Night Only, released as the first and only single from their self-titled second album. It had its first play on Greg James's BBC Radio 1 show on 25 June 2010, and was later released as a single on digital and physical formats in August.

== Music video ==
The music video, filmed in New York City and directed by James Lees, first aired on Channel 4 on 26 June 2010. It features actress Emma Watson. George Craig originally became friends with Watson after they both featured in a Burberry modelling campaign. The music video was filmed over two days. It depicts the band performing in Brooklyn with the Manhattan skyline in the background, intercut with a subplot in which George Craiq leaves the group to pursue Emma Watson through the streets of New York. In the final scene, moments before Craiq and Watson kiss, a woman exits a car, approaches two dogs, and takes one away. This act symbolizes that Craiq and Watson were metaphorically portrayed as dogs, clarifying earlier scenes such as Craiq being chased from a store or licking Watson after receiving a thrown pretzel from the Gray's Papaya hot dog stand. According to Emma Watson the video is an Ode to Lady and the Tramp.

== Track listing ==
UK CD single

1. "Say You Don't Want It" (radio edit) – 3:37
2. "Daydream" – 3:12
3. "Say You Don't Want It" (video) – 4:08
4. "Say You Don't Want It" (behind the scenes) – 6:38

Digital download

1. "Say You Don't Want It" (radio edit) – 3:37
2. "Say You Don't Want It" (video) – 4:08

== Charts ==
Chart (2010)	Peak position
UK Singles Chart	23
