= Antonio Napolitano =

Antonio Napolitano may refer to:

- Antonio Napolitano (film critic) (1928–2014), Italian film critic
- Antonio Napolitano (footballer) (born 1999), Argentine footballer

== See also ==
- Antonio Napoletano (1937–2019), Italian Roman Catholic bishop
