= Just for Tonight =

Just for Tonight may refer to:

- Just for Tonight (film), a 1918 silent film starring Tom Moore
- "Just for Tonight" (One Night Only song)
- "Just for Tonight" (Vanessa Williams song)
- "Just for Tonight", a song by The Chiffons
- "Just for Tonight", a song by Gilbert Montagné
- "Just for Tonight", a song by Seiko Matsuda
- "Just for Tonight", a song by Ville Valo and Manna Lindström
- "Just for Tonight", a song from the musical Operation Mincemeat
