= List of awards and nominations received by Emma Watson =

Accolades received by English actress

Emma Watson awards and nominations
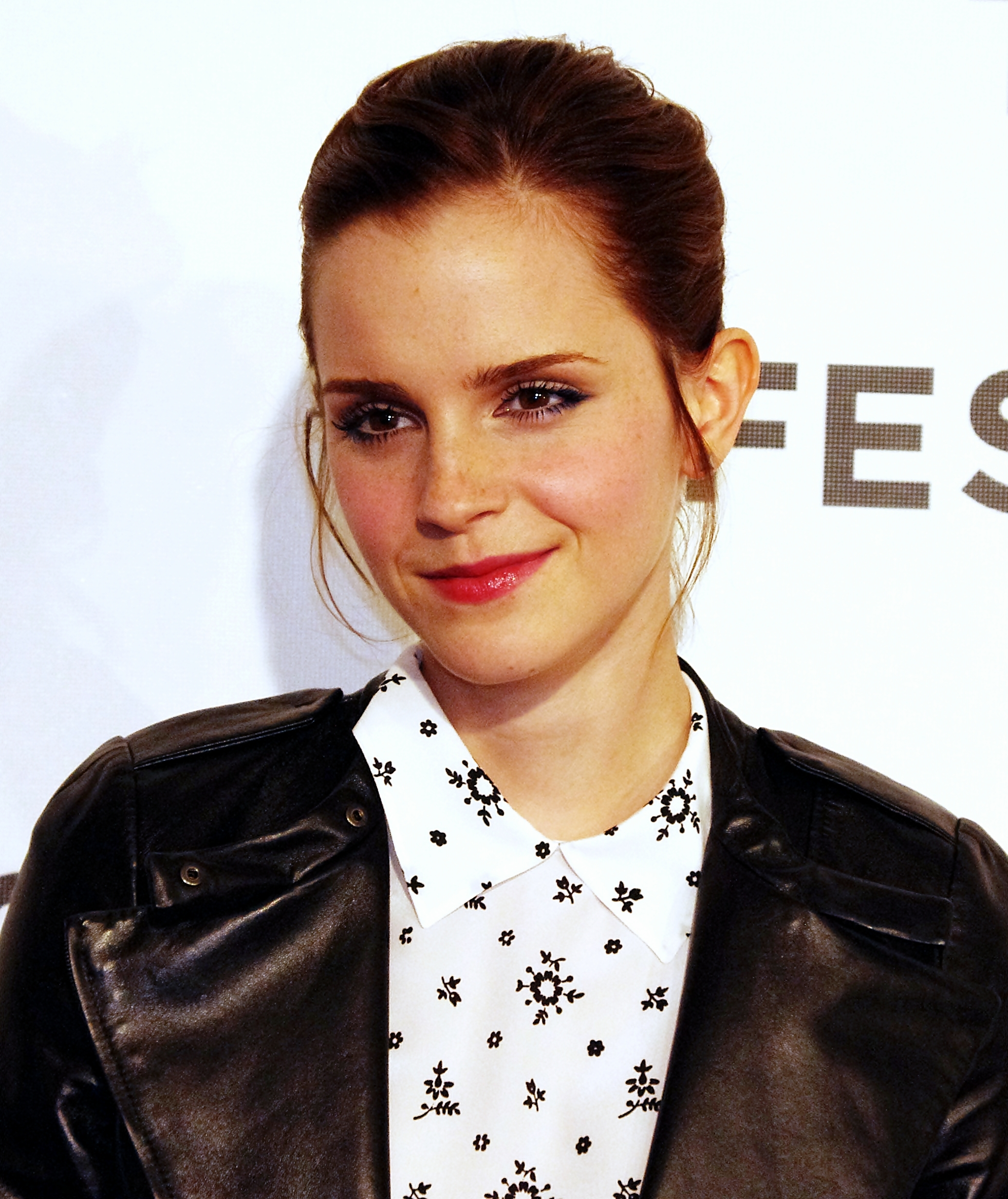
- Watson at the 2012 Tribeca Film Festival
Awards and nominations
| Award | Wins | Nominations |

Totals (Note: Certain award groups do not simply award one winner. They acknowledge several different recipients, have runners-up, and have third place. Since this is a specific recognition and is different from losing an award, runner-up mentions are considered wins in this award tally. For simplification and to avoid errors, each award in this list has been presumed to have had a prior nomination.)
- Wins: 28
- Nominations: 65

Emma Watson is an English actress and activist. She has won eight Teen Choice Awards, three MTV Movie Awards and has won and been nominated for various other awards throughout her career.

== Industry Awards ==
=== Young Artist Association ===
The Young Artist Award (originally known as the Youth In Film Award) is an accolade bestowed by the Young Artist Association, a non-profit organization founded in 1978 to honor excellence of youth performers, and to provide scholarships for young artists who may be physically and/or financially challenged.

| Year | Category | Nominated work | Result | Ref. |
|---|---|---|---|---|
| 2002 | Best Performance in a Feature Film – Leading Young Actress | Harry Potter and the Philosopher's Stone | Won | |
| 2002 | Best Ensemble in a Feature Film | Harry Potter and the Philosopher's Stone | Nominated (Note: Shared with Rupert Grint and Tom Felton) | |

=== Academy of Science Fiction, Fantasy and Horror Films ===
The Saturn Awards are presented annually by the Academy of Science Fiction, Fantasy and Horror Films to honor science fiction, fantasy, horror and genre films

| Year | Category | Nominated work | Result | Ref. |
|---|---|---|---|---|
| 2002 | Best Young Actor | Harry Potter and the Philosopher's Stone | Nominated | |
| 2012 | Best Supporting Actress | Harry Potter and the Deathly Hallows – Part 2 | Nominated | |
| 2018 | Best Actress | Beauty and the Beast | Nominated | |

=== Chlotrudis Society for Independent Film ===
The Chlotrudis Society for Independent Film is a non-profit organization that honors outstanding achievement in independent and foreign films. The organization gives out the Chlotrudis Awards.

| Year | Category | Nominated work | Result | Ref. |
|---|---|---|---|---|
| 2013 | Best Performance by an Ensemble Cast | The Perks of Being a Wallflower | Nominated (Note: Shared with the cast) | |

=== American Comedy Awards ===
The American Comedy Awards were a group of awards presented annually in the United States recognizing performances and performers in the field of comedy, with an emphasis on television comedy and comedy films.

| Year | Category | Nominated work | Result | Ref. |
|---|---|---|---|---|
| 2014 | Comedy Supporting Actress – Film | This Is the End | Nominated | |

== Film festival awards ==
| Year | Film Festival | Category | Nominated work | Result | Ref. |
|---|---|---|---|---|---|
| 2012 | Capri, Hollywood International Film Festival | Capri Ensemble Cast Award | My Week with Marilyn | Won | |

== Critics Awards ==
=== Broadcast Film Critics Association ===
The Critics' Choice Movie Awards (formerly known as the Broadcast Film Critics Association Awards) are presented annually by the American-Canadian Critics Choice Association (CCA) to honor the finest in cinematic achievement.

| Year | Category | Nominated work | Result | Ref. |
|---|---|---|---|---|
| 2005 | Best Young Actress | Harry Potter and the Prisoner of Azkaban | Nominated | |
| 2006 | Best Young Actress | Harry Potter and the Goblet of Fire | Nominated | |
| 2020 | Best Acting Ensemble | Little Women | Nominated | |

=== Boston Society of Film Critics ===
The Boston Society of Film Critics is an organization of film reviewers from Boston, Massachusetts that have bestowed their annual Boston Society of Film Critics Awards since 1981.

| Year | Category | Nominated work | Result | Ref. |
|---|---|---|---|---|
| 2012 | Best Supporting Actress | The Perks of Being a Wallflower | Runner-up | |
| 2020 | Best Ensemble Cast | Little Women | Won | |

=== Empire Awards ===
Presented by the British film magazine Empire until 2018, the Empire Awards was a British awards ceremony held annually to recognize cinematic achievements.

| Year | Category | Nominated Work | Result | Ref. |
|---|---|---|---|---|
| 2002 | Best Debut | Harry Potter and the Philosopher's Stone | Nominated (Note: Shared with Daniel Radcliffe and Rupert Grint) | |
| 2008 | Best Actress | Harry Potter and the Order of the Phoenix | Nominated | |
| 2011 | Best Actress | Harry Potter and the Deathly Hallows – Part 1 | Nominated | |
| 2018 | Best Actress | Beauty and the Beast | Nominated | |

=== Regional Critics Associations ===
| Year | Organisation | Award | Nominated work | Result | Ref. |
|---|---|---|---|---|---|
| 2002 | Phoenix Film Critics Society | Best Youth Performance | Harry Potter and The Sorcerer's Stone | Nominated | |
| 2003 | Phoenix Film Critics Society | Best Performance by a Youth in a Leading or Supporting Role - Female | Harry Potter and the Chamber of Secrets | Won | |
| 2003 | Phoenix Film Critics Society | Best Acting Ensemble | Harry Potter and the Chamber of Secrets | Nominated | |
| 2010 | St. Louis Gateway Film Critics Association | Special Merit (for best scene, cinematic technique or other memorable aspect or moment) For the "obliviate" scene in which Hermione ('Emma Watson') erases her parents' memories of her. | Harry Potter and the Deathly Hallows - Part 1 | Nominated | |
| 2011 | Gold Derby Awards | Best Ensemble Cast | Harry Potter and the Deathly Hallows – Part 2 | Nominated | |
| 2011 | Awards Circuit Community | Best Cast Ensemble | Harry Potter and the Deathly Hallows – Part 2 | Nominated | |
| 2011 | Washington D.C. Area Film Critics Association | Best Ensemble | Harry Potter and the Deathly Hallows – Part 2 | Nominated | |
| 2011 | San Diego Film Critics Society | Best Ensemble Performance | Harry Potter and the Deathly Hallows – Part 2 | Won | |
| 2012 | San Diego Film Critics Society | Best Ensemble Performance | The Perks of Being a Wallflower | Won | |
| 2012 | San Diego Film Critics Society | Best Supporting Actress | The Perks of Being a Wallflower | Won | |
| 2012 | St. Louis Gateway Film Critics Association | Best Supporting Actress | The Perks of Being a Wallflower | Nominated | |
| 2012 | Village Voice Film Poll | Best Actress | The Perks of Being a Wallflower | Nominated | |
| 2012 | IndieWire Critics Poll | Best Supporting Performance | The Perks of Being a Wallflower | Nominated | |
| 2012 | Indiana Film Journalists Association | Best Supporting Actress | The Perks of Being a Wallflower | Nominated | |
| 2012 | Awards Circuit Community | Best Actress in a Supporting Role | The Perks of Being a Wallflower | Nominated | |
| 2012 | Awards Circuit Community | Best Cast Ensemble | The Perks of Being a Wallflower | Nominated | |
| 2012 | North Carolina Film Critics Association | Best Supporting Actress | The Perks of Being a Wallflower | Nominated | |
| 2012 | Phoenix Film Critics Society | Best Actress In A Supporting Role | The Perks of Being a Wallflower | Nominated | |
| 2013 | Indiana Film Journalists Association | Best Supporting Actress | The Bling Ring | Nominated | |
| 2013 | Village Voice Film Poll | Best Supporting Actress | The Bling Ring | Nominated | |
| 2013 | International Online Cinema Awards | Best Supporting Actress | The Bling Ring | Nominated | |
| 2016 | Women Film Critics Circle | Acting and Activism Award | —N/a | Won | |
| 2016 | Women Film Critics Circle | Best Female Action Hero | Colonia | Nominated | |
| 2019 | Washington D.C. Area Film Critics Association | Best Ensemble | Little Women | Nominated | |
| 2019 | Florida Film Critics Circle | Best Ensemble | Little Women | Won | |
| 2019 | Seattle Film Critics Society | Best Ensemble | Little Women | Nominated | |
| 2019 | Chicago Indie Critics Association | Best Ensemble | Little Women | Nominated | |
| 2019 | Online Association of Female Film Critics | Best Acting Ensemble | Little Women | Nominated | |
| 2019 | Boston Online Film Critics Association | Best Ensemble | Little Women | Won | |
| 2020 | Austin Film Critics Association | Best Ensemble | Little Women | Nominated | |
| 2020 | Gold Derby Awards | Best Ensemble Cast | Little Women | Nominated | |
| 2020 | Gold Derby Awards | Ensemble of the Decade | Little Women | Nominated | |
| 2020 | Columbus Film Critics Association | Best Ensemble | Little Women | Nominated | |
| 2020 | AARP's Movies for Grownups Awards | Best Ensemble | Little Women | Nominated | |
| 2020 | Georgia Film Critics Association | Best Ensemble | Little Women | Won | |

== Audience Awards ==
=== MTV Movie Awards ===
The MTV Movie Awards is a film awards show presented annually on MTV. The nominees are decided by producers and executives at MTV. Winners are decided online by the general public. Presently voting is done through MTV's official website through a special Movie Awards link at movieawards.mtv.com.

| Year | Category | Nominated work | Result | Ref. |
|---|---|---|---|---|
| 2006 | Best On-Screen Team | Harry Potter and the Goblet of Fire | Nominated | |
| 2010 | Best Female Performance | Harry Potter and the Half-Blood Prince | Nominated | |
| 2011 | Best Female Performance | Harry Potter and the Deathly Hallows – Part 1 | Nominated | |
| 2011 | Best Kiss | Harry Potter and the Deathly Hallows – Part 1 | Nominated (Note: Shared with Daniel Radcliffe) | |
| 2011 | Best Fight | Harry Potter and the Deathly Hallows – Part 1 | Nominated (Note: Shared with Daniel Radcliffe, Rupert Grint, Arben Bajraktaraj and Rod Hunt) | |
| 2012 | Best Female Performance | Harry Potter and the Deathly Hallows – Part 2 | Nominated | |
| 2012 | Best Kiss | Harry Potter and the Deathly Hallows – Part 2 | Nominated (Note: Shared with Rupert Grint) | |
| 2012 | Best Cast | Harry Potter and the Deathly Hallows – Part 2 | Won (Note: Shared with Daniel Radcliffe, Rupert Grint and Tom Felton) | |
| 2013 | Best Female Performance | The Perks of Being a Wallflower | Nominated | |
| 2013 | Best Kiss | The Perks of Being a Wallflower | Nominated (Note: Shared with Logan Lerman) | |
| 2013 | Best Musical Moment | The Perks of Being a Wallflower | Nominated (Note: Shared with Logan Lerman and Ezra Miller) | |
| 2013 | MTV Trailblazer Award | —N/a | Won | |
| 2017 | Best Performance in a Movie | Beauty and the Beast | Won | |
| 2017 | Best Kiss | Beauty and the Beast | Nominated (Note: Shared with Dan Stevens) | |

=== People's Choice Awards ===
The People's Choice Awards is an American awards show, recognizing the people and the work of popular culture, voted on by the general public. The show has been held annually since 1975. The People's Choice Awards is broadcast on CBS and is produced by Procter & Gamble and Survivor producer, Mark Burnett. In Canada, it is shown on Global.

| Year | Category | Nominated work | Result | Ref. |
|---|---|---|---|---|
| 2010 | Favorite On-Screen Team | Harry Potter and the Half-Blood Prince | Nominated | |
| 2011 | Favorite Movie Star (Under 25) | —N/a | Nominated | |
| 2011 | Favorite Ensemble Movie Cast | Harry Potter and the Deathly Hallows – Part 2 | Won | |
| 2013 | Favourite Drama Movie Actress | The Perks of Being a Wallflower | Won | |
| 2014 | Favorite Comedic Movie Actress | This Is the End | Nominated | |
| 2018 | Style Star of 2018 | —N/a | Nominated | |

=== Other Awards ===
| Year | Organisation | Award | Nominated work | Result | Ref. |
|---|---|---|---|---|---|
| 2006 | Australian Kids' Choice Awards | Favourite Female Movie Star | Harry Potter and the Goblet of Fire | Nominated | |
| 2007 | National Movie Awards | Best Performance by a Female | Harry Potter and the Order of the Phoenix | Won | |
| 2010 | Teen Choice Awards | Choice Movie Actress: Fantasy | Harry Potter and the Half-Blood Prince | Nominated | |
| 2011 | Kids' Choice Awards | Favorite Movie Actress | Harry Potter and the Deathly Hallows – Part 1 | Nominated | |
| 2011 | National Movie Awards | Performance of the Year | Harry Potter and the Deathly Hallows – Part 1 | Nominated | |
| 2011 | Teen Choice Awards | Choice Movie: Actress Sci-Fi/Fantasy | Harry Potter and the Deathly Hallows – Part 1 | Won | |
| 2011 | Teen Choice Awards | Choice Movie: Liplock | Harry Potter and the Deathly Hallows – Part 1 | Won | |
| 2011 | Teen Choice Awards | Choice Summer Movie: Female | Harry Potter and the Deathly Hallows – Part 2 | Won | |
| 2012 | Kids' Choice Awards | Favorite Movie Actress | Harry Potter and the Deathly Hallows – Part 2 | Nominated | |
| 2013 | Teen Choice Awards | Choice Movie Actress: Drama | The Perks of Being a Wallflower | Won | |
| 2013 | Teen Choice Awards | Choice Movie: Liplock | The Perks of Being a Wallflower | Nominated | |
| 2013 | Teen Choice Awards | Choice Style Icon | —N/a | Nominated | |
| 2014 | Teen Choice Awards | Choice Movie Actress: Drama | Noah | Nominated | |
| 2014 | Britannia Awards | British Artist of the Year | —N/a | Won | |
| 2014 | British Fashion Awards | Best British Style | —N/a | Won | |
| 2017 | Jupiter Awards | Best International Actress | Colonia | Nominated | |
| 2017 | Teen Choice Awards | Choice Fantasy Movie Actress | Beauty and the Beast | Won | |
| 2017 | Teen Choice Awards | Choice Movie Ship | Beauty and the Beast | Won | |
| 2017 | Teen Choice Awards | Choice Liplock | Beauty and the Beast | Won | |
| 2017 | Teen Choice Awards | Choice Drama Movie Actress | The Circle | Won | |
| 2018 | Golden Raspberry Awards | Worst Actress | The Circle | Nominated | |
| 2018 | Kids' Choice Awards | Favorite Movie Actress | Beauty and the Beast | Nominated | |
