= List of film critics =

Film critics analyze and evaluate film.

They can be divided into journalistic critics, who write for newspapers and other popular mass-media outlets; and academic critics who are informed by film theory and publish in journals.

== Notable journalistic critics ==
- Taran Adarsh (indiaFM)
- James Agee (Time, The Nation)
- Hollis Alpert (Saturday Review)
- David Ansen (Newsweek)
- Michael Atkinson
- James Berardinelli
- Peter Biskind
- Peter Bogdanovich
- Hye Bossin
- Peter Bradshaw (The Guardian)
- Joe Bob Briggs
- Richard Brody (The New Yorker)
- Tom Brook (BBC)
- Ty Burr (The Boston Globe)
- Ernest Callenbach
- Vincent Canby (The New York Times)
- Charles Champlin (The Los Angeles Times)
- Justin Chang (The Los Angeles Times, Fresh Air, Variety)
- Anupama Chopra (Anupama Chopra)
- Michel Ciment (Positif)
- Jay Cocks (Time)
- Pat Collins (WWOR-TV)
- Richard Corliss (Time)
- Kevin Courrier (CBC Radio, Toronto Star, The Globe and Mail)
- Judith Crist (New York Herald Tribune, New York, TV Guide, Today)
- Richard Crouse
- Bosley Crowther (The New York Times)
- Mike D'Angelo (Esquire)
- Manohla Dargis (The New York Times)
- David Denby (The New Yorker)
- Alonso Duralde (The Wrap)
- Roger Ebert (Chicago Sun-Times, At the Movies with Ebert & Roeper)
- David Edelstein (New York Magazine, NPR's Fresh Air, CBS Sunday Morning)
- Glenn Erickson (Online Film Critics Society)
- Manny Farber (The New Republic, Artforum)
- Otis Ferguson (The New Republic)
- Arturo Rodríguez Fernández
- John H. Foote
- Gary Franklin (KABC-TV)
- Philip French (The Observer)
- Penelope Gilliatt (The Observer, The New Yorker)
- Owen Gleiberman (Entertainment Weekly)
- Randor Guy
- Leslie Halliwell
- Jake Hamilton (Houston Chronicle)
- Molly Haskell (New York Magazine)
- J. Hoberman (The Village Voice)
- Stephen Holden (The New York Times)
- Ann Hornaday (The Washington Post)
- Stephen Hunter (The Baltimore Sun, The Washington Post)
- Pauline Kael (The New Yorker)
- Sudhish Kamath (The Hindu)
- Stanley Kauffmann (The New Republic)
- Dave Kehr (The Chicago Reader, The Chicago Tribune, The New York Daily News, The New York Times)
- Lisa Kennedy (The Denver Post)
- Glenn Kenny (Premiere)
- Mark Kermode (The Observer, BBC Radio 5 Live)
- Anthony Lane (The New Yorker)
- Mick LaSalle (San Francisco Chronicle)
- C.A. Lejeune (The Observer)
- Christy Lemire (Associated Press)
- Emanuel Levy ((Variety)
- Lou Lumenick (New York Post)
- Jeffrey Lyons (WNBC)
- Derek Malcolm (The Guardian)
- Leonard Maltin (Entertainment Tonight, Leonard Maltin's Movie Guide)
- Morton Marcus (Cinema Scene)
- Rajeev Masand (CNN-IBN, India)
- Janet Maslin (The New York Times)
- Harold McCarthy
- Todd McCarthy (Variety, The Hollywood Reporter)
- Michael Medved (New York Post, Sneak Previews)
- Nell Minow (rogerebert.com and moviedom.com)
- Elvis Mitchell (The New York Times, Fort Worth Star-Telegram, Los Angeles Herald Examiner, The Detroit Free Press)
- Khalid Mohammed (Hindustan Times)
- Joe Morgenstern (The Wall Street Journal)
- Wesley Morris (The Boston Globe)
- Vittorio Mussolini
- Kim Newman (Empire)
- Barry Norman (BBC)
- Frank Nugent (The New York Times)
- Mario Nuzzolese (Corriere della Sera)
- Robert Osborne
- Geoff Pevere (CBC Radio, Toronto Star, The Globe and Mail)
- Michael Phillips (Chicago Tribune)
- Margaret Pomeranz (At the Movies)
- Dilys Powell (The Sunday Times)
- Vasiraju Prakasam (Vaartha)
- Nathan Rabin (The A.V. Club)
- Rex Reed (New York Observer)
- B. Ruby Rich (Film Quarterly)
- Frank Rich (Time, New York)
- Carrie Rickey (Philadelphia Inquirer)
- Shirrel Rhoades
- Richard Roeper (Chicago Sun-Times, At the Movies with Ebert & Roeper)
- Jonathan Rosenbaum (Chicago Reader)
- Jonathan Ross (BBC)
- Dan Sallitt (The Los Angeles Reader, The Chicago Reader, The Village Voice, MUBI)
- Andrew Sarris (The Village Voice)
- Richard Schickel (Time)
- Paul Schrader (Film Comment)
- A. O. Scott (New York Times)
- Lisa Schwarzbaum (Entertainment Weekly)
- Matt Zoller Seitz (The House Next Door, RogerEbert.com)
- Gene Shalit (NBC's Today Show)
- Mayank Shekhar (Dainik Bhaskar)
- Tom Shone (The Sunday Times)
- Joel Siegel (Good Morning America)
- John Simon (New York, Esquire)
- Gene Siskel (Chicago Tribune, Siskel & Ebert)
- David Sterritt (The Christian Science Monitor)
- Dana Stevens (Slate)
- David Stratton (At the Movies)
- Elliott Stein (Village Voice)
- Amy Taubin (Artforum)
- Anne Thompson (Variety, The Hollywood Reporter)
- David Thomson
- Desson Thomson (The Washington Post)
- Peter Travers (Rolling Stone)
- François Truffaut (Cahiers du cinéma)
- Kenneth Turan (The Los Angeles Times, Morning Edition)
- Parker Tyler (Film Culture)
- Jan Wahl (KRON-TV)
- Alexander Walker (London Evening Standard and others)
- David Walsh (World Socialist Web Site)
- Michael Walsh ("The Province")
- Armond White (New York Press)
- Stephanie Zacharek (Time, Salon (website))
- Ziad Abdullah (The New Arab, Al Akhbar (Lebanon), Al-Hayat and Emarat Al Youm)

== Notable academic critics ==
- Rudolf Arnheim
- Béla Balázs
- André Bazin (Cahiers du Cinéma)
- David Bordwell
- Noël Burch
- Ernest Callenbach
- Ray Carney
- Park Chan-wook
- Carol J. Clover
- Hamid Dabashi
- Serge Daney (Cahiers du Cinéma, Libération, Trafic)
- Maya Deren
- Wheeler Winston Dixon
- Mary Ann Doane
- Vijayakrishnan
- Raymond Durgnat
- Sergei Eisenstein
- William K. Everson
- Ritwik Ghatak
- Denis Gifford
- Jean-Luc Godard (Cahiers du Cinéma)
- Shigehiko Hasumi
- Siegfried Kracauer
- Emanuel Levy
- Jay Leyda
- Phillip Lopate
- Kaden Loyet
- Adrian Martin
- Christian Metz
- James Monaco
- Laura Mulvey
- Hugo Münsterberg
- Antonio Napolitano
- James Naremore
- Nagisa Oshima
- Satyajit Ray
- Tony Rayns
- Éric Rohmer (Cahiers du Cinéma)
- Raúl Ruiz (director)
- Jacques Rivette (Cahiers du Cinéma)
- Tadao Sato
- Kaja Silverman
- Susan Sontag
- David Sterritt
- David Stratton
- Kristin Thompson
- Alexis Tioseco
- Ignatiy Vishnevetsky
- Robin Wood
- Slavoj Žižek
