= One Night Only (One Night Only album) =

Studio album by One Night Only
- Released: 23 August 2010
- Recorded: 2010
- Genre: Indie pop, alternative rock, new wave
- Length: 43:21
- Label: Mercury
- Producer: Ed Buller

One Night Only chronology
Started a Fire (2008)	One Night Only (2010)	Where The Sleepless Go (2015)

Singles from One Night Only
- 1. "Say You Don't Want It" Released: 25 June 2010

Professional ratings
Review scores
Source	Rating
AllMusic	4/5 stars

One Night Only is the self-titled second studio album by British alternative rock band One Night Only. It was released on 23 August 2010.

The new songs were first performed at the SXSW festival in March 2010. The band played "Say You Don't Want It", "Forget My Name", "Chemistry", "Anything", "Got It All Wrong" and "All I Want". On their June 2010 tour, they played "Never Be The Same" and "Bring Me Back Down" in place of "Anything" and "Got It All Wrong".

The sole single from the album was "Say You Don't Want It", released on 25 June 2010, two months before the album.

"Chemistry" was announced as the intended second single from the album, which was later scrapped for reasons unknown. Filming for the music video took place in Spain in mid-August.

"All I Want" was offered as a free download.

The album entered the UK iTunes Top 10, making a first week appearance at number 36 on the UK Albums Chart. It left the Top 100 the following week.

== Track listing ==
No.	Title	Length
1.	"Say You Don't Want It"	4:08
2.	"Bring Me Back Down"	3:21
3.	"Forget My Name"	3:52
4.	"Chemistry"	3:51
5.	"Never Be The Same"	4:04
6.	"All I Want"	3:33
7.	"Got It All Wrong"	4:30
8.	"Anything"	4:05
9.	"Nothing Left"	3:44
10.	"Feeling Fine"	3:47
11.	"Can't Stop Now"	4:26

iTunes version
No.	Title	Length
12.	"Hurricane"	3:08
13.	"Exclusive One Night Only Wednesday (video)"	3:24
