= Emma Watson =

English actress (born 1990)

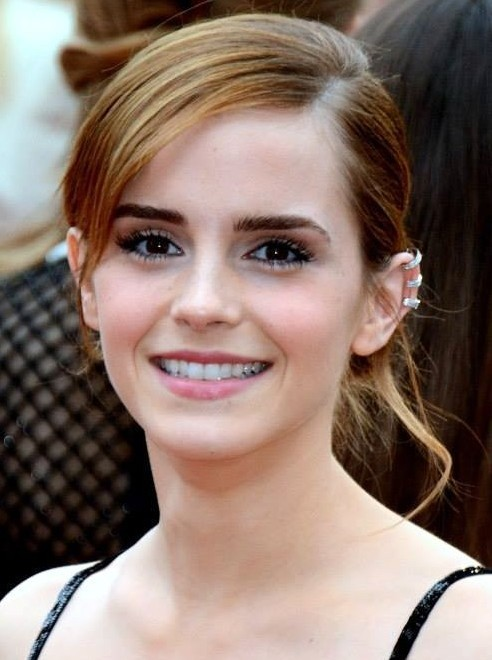
- Watson in 2013
- Born: Emma Charlotte Duerre Watson; 15 April 1990 (age 36); Paris, France
- Education: Brown University: B.A., English Literature; University of Oxford: MSt, Creative Writing
- Occupation: Actress
- Years active: 1999–present
- Awards: Full list

Emma Charlotte Duerre Watson (born 15 April 1990) is a former English actress. In the 2010s, she was ranked among the world's highest-paid actresses by Forbes and Vanity Fair, and was named one of the 100 most influential people in the world by Time magazine in 2015.

Watson attended the Dragon School and trained in acting at the Oxford branch of Stagecoach Theatre Arts. As a child, she rose to stardom after landing her first professional acting role as Hermione Granger in the Harry Potter film series, having previously acted only in school plays. Watson made her first major foray beyond the Potter franchise starring in Ballet Shoes (2007), and she lent her voice to The Tale of Despereaux (2008). After the final Harry Potter film, she took on a supporting role in My Week with Marilyn (2011), before starring as Sam, a flirtatious, free-spirited student in The Perks of Being a Wallflower (2012), to critical success. Further acclaim came from portraying Alexis Neiers in Sofia Coppola's The Bling Ring (2013) and the titular character's adoptive daughter in Darren Aronofsky's biblical epic Noah (2014). That same year, Watson was honoured by the British Academy of Film and Television Arts, winning British Artist of the Year. She also starred as Belle in the live-action musical romantic fantasy Beauty and the Beast (2017), and as Meg March in Greta Gerwig's coming-of-age drama Little Women (2019).

From 2011 to 2014, Watson split her time between working on films and continuing her education, graduating from Brown University with a bachelor's degree in English literature in May 2014. That year, she was appointed a UN Women Goodwill Ambassador and helped launch the UN Women campaign HeForShe, which advocates for gender equality. In 2015 and 2016, Watson was selected twice for the annual Forbes 30 under 30 list. In 2018, she helped launch Time's Up UK as a founding member. Watson was appointed to a G7 advisory body for women's rights in 2019, consulting with leaders on foreign policy. Her modelling work has included campaigns for Burberry and Lancôme. She also lent her name to a clothing line for the sustainable brand People Tree. From 2020 to 2023, she sat on the board of directors of Kering, a luxury brand group, as an advocate for sustainable fashion.

== Early life and education ==
Emma Charlotte Duerre Watson was born on April 15, 1990, in Paris, France, to English lawyers Chris Watson and Jacqueline Luesby. (Note: Attributed to multiple references:) Watson lived in Maisons-Laffitte until age five, when her parents divorced. She moved to England to live with her mother in Oxfordshire and spent weekends at her father's house in London. (Note: Attributed to multiple references:) After moving to Oxford with her mother and younger brother, she was educated at the Dragon School until 2003. She wanted to become an actress from the age of six, and trained at the Oxford branch of Stagecoach Theatre Arts, a part-time theatre school where she studied acting, dancing, and singing. By age 10, she had performed in Stagecoach productions and school plays including Arthur: The Young Years and The Happy Prince. After the Dragon School, Watson attended Headington School Oxford. While shooting the Harry Potter films, she was tutored on set for up to five hours a day.

After completing her secondary education, Watson took a gap year to film Harry Potter and the Deathly Hallows – Parts 1 and 2, starting in February 2009. She then enrolled at Brown University in Providence, Rhode Island, graduating with a Bachelor of Arts degree in English literature in 2014. During the 2011–12 academic year, she attended Worcester College, Oxford, as part of the Visiting Student Programme. She was appointed a visiting fellow at Lady Margaret Hall, Oxford in 2016, and began a Master of Studies in creative writing at New College, Oxford in 2023. In 2025, she began to pursue a DPhil at The University of Oxford.

== Career ==
=== 1999–2009: Harry Potter and worldwide recognition ===
In 1999, casting began for Harry Potter and the Philosopher's Stone, the film adaptation of British author J. K. Rowling's best-selling novel. Casting agents found Watson through her Oxford theatre teacher. She had acted in school plays, but had no film acting experience. Her first audition took place when she was nine years old. (Note: Attributed to multiple references:) Although Watson had to audition a total of eight times before earning the role, Rowling supported her casting after her first screen test. Prior to casting Watson, the producers considered Hatty Jones for the role.

The release of Harry Potter and the Philosopher's Stone in 2001 was Watson's debut screen performance. The film broke records for opening-day sales and opening-weekend takings and was the highest-grossing film of 2001. Critics singled out Watson for particular acclaim; The Daily Telegraph called her performance "admirable", and IGN said she "stole the show". Watson was nominated for five awards for her performance in Philosopher's Stone, winning the Young Artist Award for Leading Young Actress. She was chosen as one of Entertainment Weekly's Breakout Performers of 2001.

A year later, Watson reprised her role as Hermione in Harry Potter and the Chamber of Secrets, the second installment of the series. Reviewers praised the lead actors' performances. The Los Angeles Times said Watson and her co-stars had matured between films, while The Times criticised director Chris Columbus for "under-employing" Watson's hugely popular character. Watson received an Otto Award from the German magazine Bravo for her performance.

In 2004, Harry Potter and the Prisoner of Azkaban was released. Watson was appreciative of the more assertive role Hermione played, calling her "charismatic" and "a fantastic role to play". Critics lauded Watson's performance; A. O. Scott of The New York Times remarked: "Luckily Mr. Radcliffe's blandness is offset by Ms. Watson's spiky impatience. Harry may show off his expanding wizardly skills ... but Hermione ... earns the loudest applause with a decidedly unmagical punch to Draco Malfoy's deserving nose." Although Prisoner of Azkaban proved to be the lowest-grossing Harry Potter film in the series, Watson's performance won her two Otto Awards and the Child Performance of the Year award from Total Film.

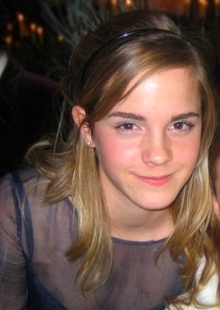
Watson at the premiere of Harry Potter and the Goblet of Fire in November 2005

With Harry Potter and the Goblet of Fire (2005), both Watson and the Harry Potter film series reached new milestones. The film set records for a Harry Potter opening weekend and opening weekend in the UK. Critics praised the increasing maturity of Watson and her teenage co-stars; The New York Times called her performance "touchingly earnest", and Peter Bradshaw of The Guardian wrote that "Watson's gutsy, confident performance nicely shows that inside and outside the world of magic there is a growing discrepancy between a teenage girl's status and her accelerating emotional and intellectual development." For Watson, much of the film's humour sprang from the tension among the three lead characters as they matured. She said, "I loved all the arguing. ... I think it's much more realistic that they would argue and that there would be problems." Nominated for three awards for Goblet of Fire, Watson won a bronze Otto Award. Watson almost quit the franchise after Goblet of Fire, saying, "I think I was scared. I don't know if you ever felt like it got to a tipping point where you were like, 'this is kind of forever now.'"

In 2006, Watson played Hermione in The Queen's Handbag, a special mini-episode of Harry Potter in celebration of Queen Elizabeth II's 80th birthday. The fifth film in the Harry Potter series, Harry Potter and the Order of the Phoenix, was released in 2007. A huge financial success, the film set a record worldwide opening-weekend gross of $332.7 million. Watson won the inaugural National Movie Award for Best Female Performance. As the fame of the actress and the series continued to rise, Watson and her Harry Potter co-stars Daniel Radcliffe and Rupert Grint left imprints of their hands, feet, and wands in front of Grauman's Chinese Theatre in Hollywood on 9 July 2007. That month, Watson's work on the Harry Potter series was said to have earned her more than £10 million, and she acknowledged she would never have to work for money again.

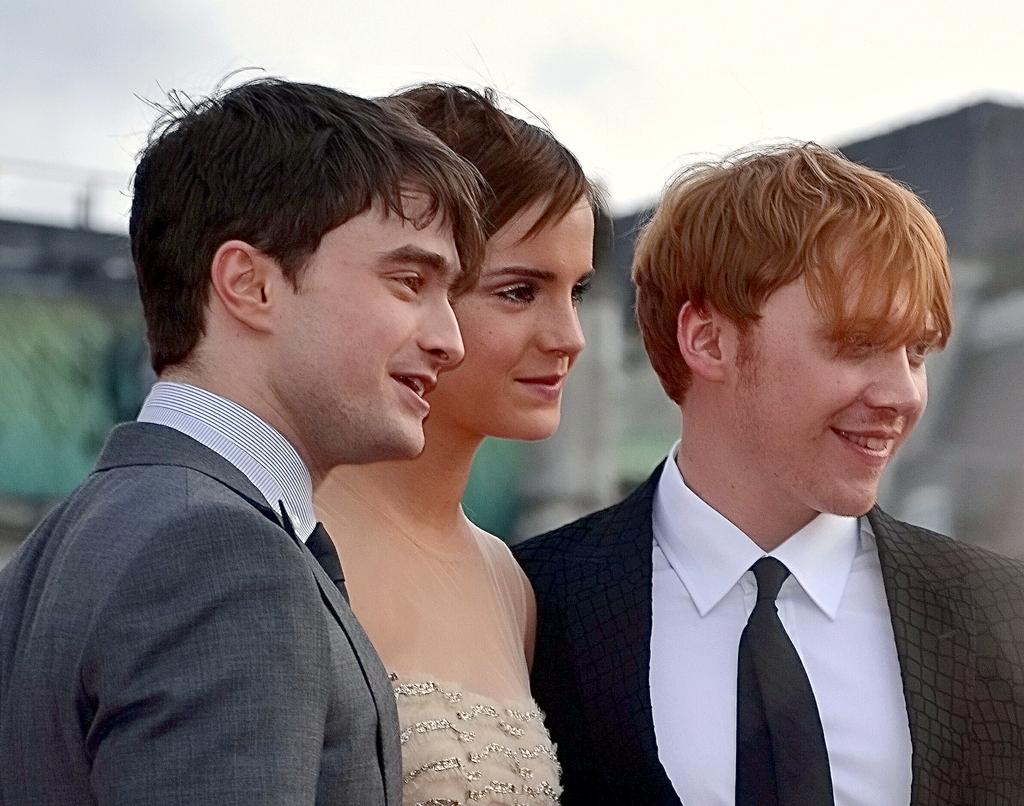
Watson with co-stars Daniel Radcliffe (left) and Rupert Grint (right) at the premiere of Harry Potter and the Deathly Hallows – Part 2 in July 2011

Prior to the release of Order of the Phoenix, the future of the Harry Potter series was in jeopardy, as all three lead actors were hesitant to sign on to continue their roles for the final installments. Watson was considerably more ambivalent than her co-stars during renegotiations. She explained that the decision was significant, as the films represented a further four-year commitment to the role, but eventually conceded that she "could never let [the role of] Hermione go", signing for the role on 23 March 2007.

Watson's first non-Potter role was the 2007 BBC film Ballet Shoes, a television adaptation of the 1936 novel of the same name by Noel Streatfeild, which starred Emilia Fox, Victoria Wood, and Richard Griffiths. The film's director, Sandra Goldbacher, commented that Watson was "perfect" for the starring role of aspiring actress Pauline Fossil: "She has a piercing, delicate aura that makes you want to gaze and gaze at her." Ballet Shoes was broadcast in the UK on Boxing Day to 5.7 million viewers, to mixed reviews. The following year, she voiced the character Princess Pea in the animation The Tale of Despereaux, a children's comedy based on the 2003 novel of the same name by Kate DiCamillo, starring Matthew Broderick, with Harry Potter co-star Robbie Coltrane also starring in the film. The Tale of Despereaux was released in December 2008 and grossed $87 million worldwide.

Principal photography for the sixth Harry Potter film began in late 2007, with Watson's part being filmed from 18 December to 17 May 2008. Harry Potter and the Half-Blood Prince premiered on 15 July 2009, having been delayed from November 2008. With the lead actors in their late teens, critics were increasingly willing to review them on the same level as the rest of the franchise's all-star cast, which the Los Angeles Times described as "a comprehensive guide to contemporary UK acting". The Washington Post felt Watson had given "[her] most charming performance to date", while The Daily Telegraph described the lead actors as "newly liberated and energised, eager to give all they have to what's left of the series".

Watson's filming for the final installment, Harry Potter and the Deathly Hallows, began on 18 February 2009 and ended on 12 June 2010. For financial and scripting reasons, the original book was divided into two films which were shot consecutively. Deathly Hallows – Part 1 was released in November 2010 while the second film was released in July 2011. Deathly Hallows – Part 2 became a commercial and critical success. The highest-grossing film in the franchise, it grossed $1.34 billion worldwide, marking Watson's most commercially successful project to date.

=== 2010–2016: Independent films and mainstream work ===
Watson appeared in a music video for One Night Only, after meeting lead singer George Craig at the 2010 Winter/Summer Burberry advertising campaign. The video, "Say You Don't Want It", was screened on Channel 4 on 26 June 2010 and released on 16 August. In her first post-Potter film, Watson appeared in My Week with Marilyn (2011) as Lucy, a wardrobe assistant who briefly dates protagonist Colin Clark, portrayed by Eddie Redmayne.

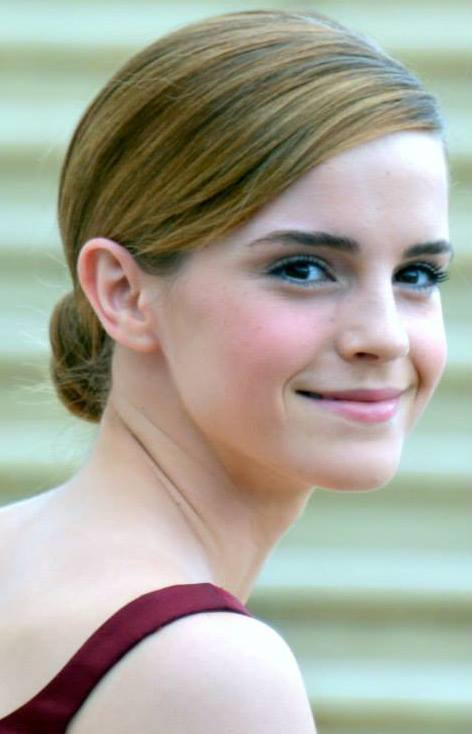
Watson attending the 2013 Cannes Film Festival

In May 2010, Watson was reported to be in talks to star in Stephen Chbosky's The Perks of Being a Wallflower, based on the 1999 novel of the same name. Filming began in summer of 2011, and the film was released in September 2012. Watson starred opposite Logan Lerman as Sam, a high school senior who befriends a fellow student named Charlie (Lerman), and helps him through his freshman year. The film opened to favourable reviews; David Sexton of the Evening Standard opined that Watson's performance was "plausible and touching", while The Atlantic reviewer Ian Buckwalter thought Watson "sheds the memory of a decade playing Hermione in the Harry Potter series with an about-face as a flirtatious but insecure free spirit.

Watson joined the cast of the satirical crime film The Bling Ring on 29 February 2012, The Sofia Coppola-directed film is based on the real-life Bling Ring robberies, with Watson playing a fictionalised version of Alexis Neiers, a TV personality who was one of seven teenagers involved in the robberies. The film released in 2013. While the film mostly received mixed reviews, critics gave almost unanimous praise for Watson's performance. Adam White of The Independent later stated that "She prove[d] remarkable.... Watson oozes casual disdain. Her sticky American vocal fry is clipped and monotone, as if she's swallowed a Kardashian for breakfast." Watson also had a supporting role in the apocalyptic comedy This Is the End (2013), in which she, Seth Rogen, James Franco, and many others played "exaggerated versions of themselves" and Watson memorably dropped the "f-bomb". She said she could not pass up the opportunity to make her first comedy and "work with some of the best comedians [...] in the world right now".

In June 2012, Watson was confirmed for the role as Ila, Shem's wife, in Darren Aronofsky's Noah, which began filming the following month and was released in March 2014. Watson referred to the role as "physically very demanding" given the usage of special effects and did extensive research on childbirth to effectively portray a scene in the film. The film, a box office success, received mixed reviews for its direction and casting; Vanity Fair wrote that "Watson anchors the film's rawest emotional scenes.... Sitting on an Icelandic beach with Russell Crowe, her hair wild and eyes burning, Watson is quiet but ferocious." In March 2013, it was reported that Watson was in negotiations to star as the title character in Kenneth Branagh's live-action Disney adaptation of Cinderella. Watson was offered the role, but turned it down because she did not connect with the character. The role ultimately went to Lily James.

Watson performed the background vocals in the second chorus of the song "Pantomime" by singer Ben Hammersley, alongside Ólafur Arnalds. The song was released on 20 January 2014.

Watson joined Judi Dench, Robert Downey Jr., Mike Leigh, Julia Louis-Dreyfus, and Mark Ruffalo as recipients of the 2014 Britannia Awards, presented on 30 October in Los Angeles. Watson was awarded British Artist of the Year, and she dedicated the prize to Millie, her pet hamster who died as Watson was filming Harry Potter and the Philosopher's Stone. Watson starred in two 2015 releases, the thrillers Colonia, opposite Daniel Brühl and Michael Nyqvist; and Regression by Alejandro Amenábar, alongside Ethan Hawke and her Harry Potter co-star David Thewlis. Both films received generally negative reviews; The Daily Telegraph critic blamed Regression's script for her "pure dramatic cardboard" role. She also appeared in an episode of BBC's The Vicar of Dibley, in which she played Reverend Iris. In February 2016, Watson announced she was taking a year-long break from acting. She planned to spend the time on her "personal development" and her women's rights work.

=== 2017–present: Work and hiatus ===
Watson starred as Belle in the 2017 live-action Disney adaptation of Beauty and the Beast directed by Bill Condon, and starring opposite Dan Stevens as the Beast. She was given autonomy within Belle's portrayal; she re-characterised her as an assistant to her inventor father and incorporated bloomers and boots into her wardrobe. The film grossed over $1.2 billion at the worldwide box office and emerged as the second-highest-grossing film of 2017 and the 17th-highest-grossing film of all time. Her reported fee was $3 million upfront with profit participation, bringing her salary up to $15 million. The film garnered positive reviews; Richard Roeper of the Chicago Sun-Times thought her performance was "all pluck and spunk and sass and smarts and fierce independence as Belle". Watson later said "When I finished the film, it kind of felt like I had made that transition into being a woman on-screen".

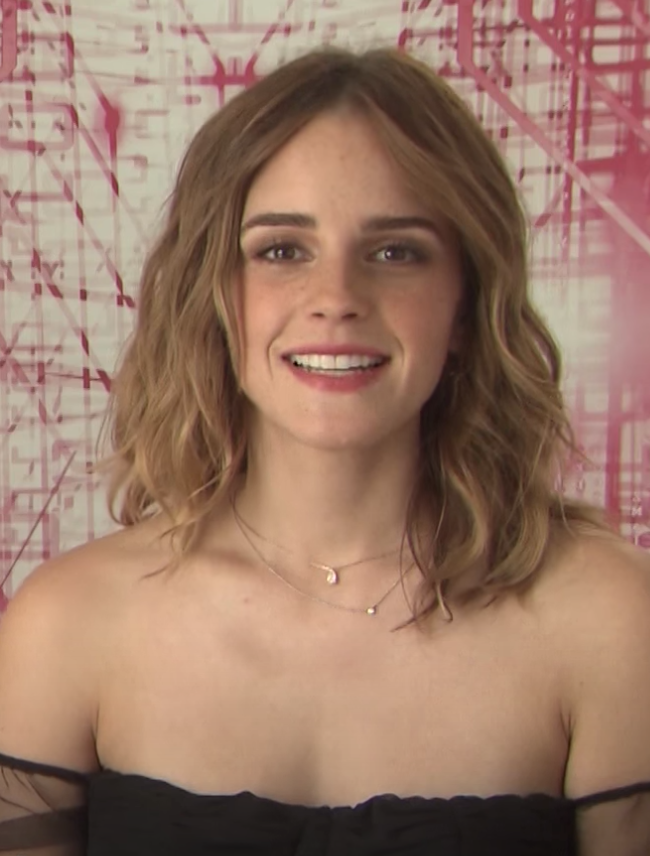
Watson promoting The Circle in 2017

In the same year, she starred opposite Tom Hanks in the film adaptation of Dave Eggers' novel The Circle as Mae Holland, who begins working at a powerful tech corporation and enters a perilous situation concerning surveillance and freedom. The film received negative reviews but was a moderate box office success. In 2019, Watson starred as Meg March in Greta Gerwig's adaptation of Louisa May Alcott's novel Little Women, co-starring with Saoirse Ronan, Florence Pugh, Laura Dern, Timothée Chalamet, and Meryl Streep. On the premise, Watson stated "I think [Little Women] was good literary device to explain that there's not one way to be a feminist.... [Meg's] way of being a feminist is making the choice – because that's really, for me anyway, what feminism is about. Her choice is that she wants to be a full-time mother and wife." Forbes stated that "Watson has perhaps the most challenging [...] role, as the proverbial straight woman of the sisters who is put on the defensive when her dreams end up being the most conventional of the lot." The film was critically acclaimed and grossed over $218 million against its $40 million budget. In 2020, Watson discussed her future career plans, stating: "Having been so public in making films and being so active on social [media] in my activism, I am curious to embrace a role where I work to amplify more voices, to continue to learn from those with different experiences", adding that her work would include "fewer red carpets and more conference meetings".

In 2021, various reports surfaced stating Watson was engaged or retiring from acting. Watson and her representatives refuted these reports; she later labelled the speculation as clickbait and attributed her relative public absence to continued social distancing during the COVID-19 pandemic. In 2022, Watson reunited with multiple cast members of the Harry Potter film series for an HBO Max special titled Harry Potter 20th Anniversary: Return to Hogwarts. The following year, Watson revealed in an interview with the Financial Times that a reason why she had not acted in almost five years was because she "wasn't very happy" with the profession and that she felt "a bit caged". However, she went on to say she would "absolutely" return to acting while also saying, "But I'm happy to sit and wait for the next right thing. I love what I do. It's finding a way to do it where I don't have to fracture myself into different faces and people. And I just don't want to switch into robot mode any more."

== Fashion career ==
Alongside her acting work, Watson has established a career in fashion through luxury modeling campaigns, design collaborations, and advocacy for sustainable clothing. In 2005, Watson began her modelling career with a photo shoot for Teen Vogue, which made her the youngest person to cover the magazine. Three years later, the British press reported that Watson was to replace Keira Knightley as the face of Chanel, but this was denied by both parties. In June 2009, following several months of rumours, Watson confirmed she would be partnering with Burberry as the face of their Autumn/Winter 2009 campaign, for which she received an estimated six-figure fee. She also appeared in Burberry's 2010 Spring/Summer campaign alongside her brother Alex, musicians George Craig and Matt Gilmour, and model Max Hurd. In February 2011, Watson was awarded the Style Icon award from British Elle by Dame Vivienne Westwood. Watson continued her involvement in fashion advertising when she announced she had been chosen as the face of Lancôme in March 2011.

In September 2009, Watson announced her involvement with People Tree, a fair trade fashion brand. Watson worked as a creative adviser for the company to create a spring line of clothing, which was released in February 2010; the range featured styles inspired by southern France and London. The collection, described by The Times as "very clever" despite their "quiet hope that [she] would become tangled at the first hemp-woven hurdle", was widely publicised in magazines such as Teen Vogue, Cosmopolitan, and People. Watson, who was not paid for the collaboration, admitted that competition for the range was minimal, but argued that "Fashion is a great way to empower people and give them skills; rather than give cash to charity you can help people by buying the clothes they make and supporting things they take pride in"; adding, "I think young people like me are becoming increasingly aware of the humanitarian issues surrounding fast fashion and want to make good choices but there aren't many options out there." Watson continued her involvement with People Tree, resulting in the release of a 2010 Autumn/Winter collection.

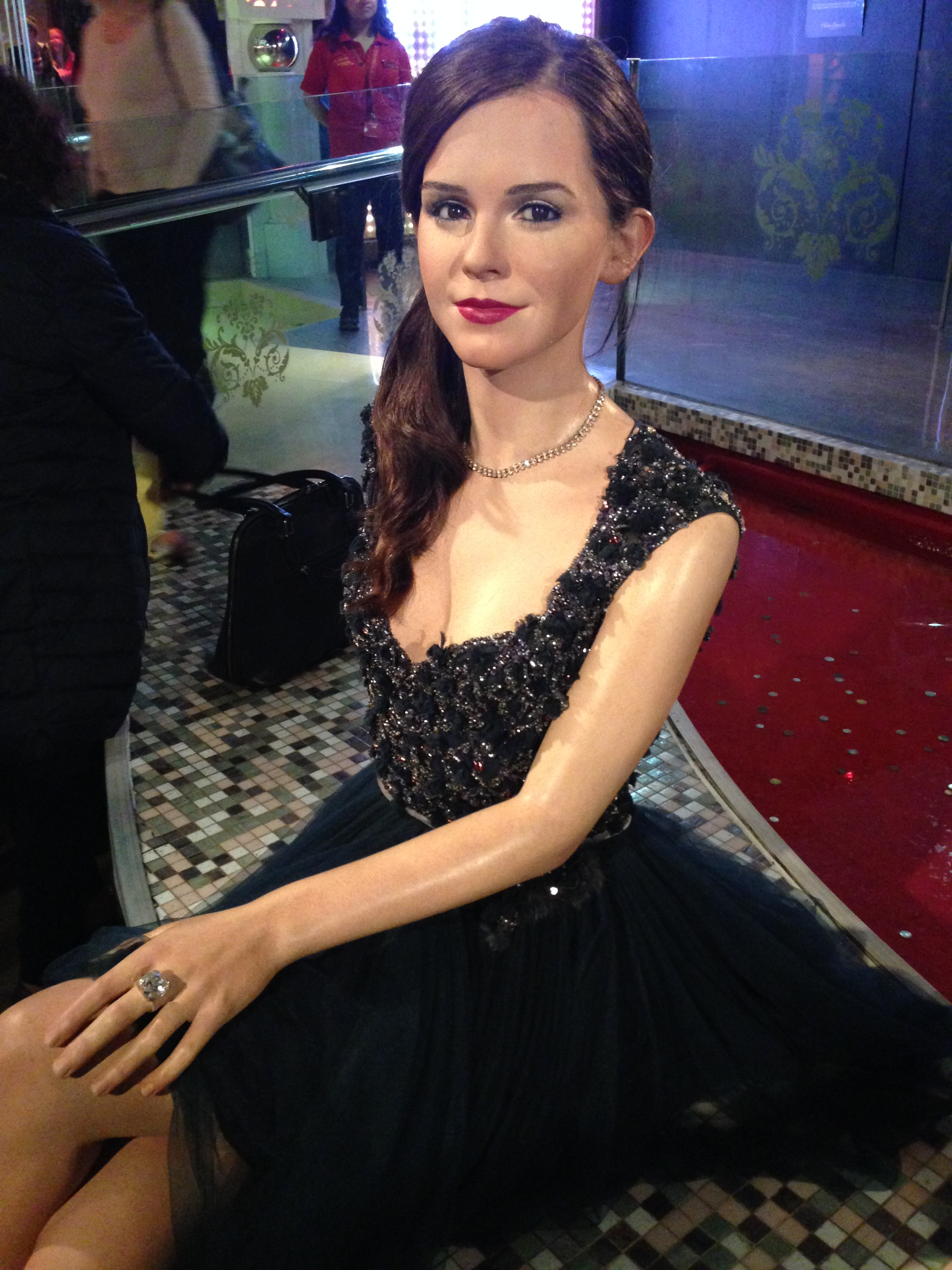
Watson's wax figure at Madame Tussauds wearing an Elie Saab design

In 2013, Madame Tussauds in London unveiled a wax statue of Watson wearing an Elie Saab haute couture design donated to the museum by the designer. A spokesperson for the museum stated, "[Watson] is one of the most requested personalities by our guests. She's a true English rose known and loved by millions of film and fashion fans around the world". Watson was awarded Best British Style at the 2014 British Fashion Awards. The competition included David Beckham, Amal Clooney, Kate Moss, and Keira Knightley.

Watson has been described as "an early adopter of sustainable fashion" and is noted for dressing ethically on the red carpet. She wore a Calvin Klein gown to the 2016 Met Gala made out of recycled plastic bottles. Watson has supported Good On You, an app that acts as a directory for the sustainability level of fashion brands. In 2017, she began updating an Instagram account entitled "The Press Tour", detailing the ethical brands she wore during the press tours for films such as Beauty and the Beast and The Circle. Watson guest-edited the March 2018 issue of Vogue Australia focusing on fashion sustainability, and was photographed by Peter Lindbergh for the magazine. In January 2020, she partnered with consignment website ThredUP to launch a "Fashion Footprint Calculator", which allows website visitors to calculate the carbon impact of their wardrobes and ways to reduce it.

In June 2020, Watson was appointed the youngest member of the board of directors of Kering, the owner of various fashion brands such as Gucci and Yves Saint Laurent. Watson would chair Kering's sustainability committee. Kering chairman François-Henri Pinault praised the new board members' "knowledge and competences, and the multiplicity of their backgrounds and perspectives". Watson stated she "hope[d] to influence decisions that will impact future generations and the world that we leave them" and was "extremely excited" to collaborate with the Kering Foundation as part of their women's rights work and looked forward to making a difference "behind the scenes". She served in this capacity until 2023.

In August 2022, Watson became the face of Prada Beauty's new fragrance Paradoxe. She starred in, directed, wrote, and narrated the short film for the fragrance's promotional campaign. In January 2024, Watson became the face of Prada's Re-Nylon collection, the sustainable product line of the brand.

== Activism and advocacy ==
=== UN Women Goodwill Ambassadorship and feminism ===
"It is time that we all perceive gender on a spectrum not as two opposing sets of ideals. [...] I want men to take up this mantle. So their daughters, sisters and mothers can be free from prejudice but also so that their sons have permission to be vulnerable and human too [...] and in doing so be a more true and complete version of themselves."

— Part of Watson's address at the headquarters of the United Nations to launch the HeForShe campaign, 2014

Watson is an outspoken feminist. She has promoted education for girls, travelling to Bangladesh and Zambia to do so. In July 2014, she was appointed a UN Women Goodwill ambassador. That September, an admittedly nervous Watson delivered an address at UN Headquarters in New York City to launch the UN Women campaign HeForShe, which aims to urge men to advocate for gender equality. In the speech, she said she began questioning gender-based assumptions at age eight when she was called "bossy", a trait she has attributed to her being a "perfectionist", whilst boys were not, and at 14 when she was "sexualised by certain elements of the media". Watson's speech described feminism as "the belief that men and women should have equal rights and opportunities" and declared that the perception of feminism as being "man-hating" is something that "has to stop". The speech made worldwide headlines from both major news outlets and fashion blogs, and the organisation's website crashed after press coverage of the event. Watson later said she received threats within less than 12 hours of making the speech, which left her "raging. [...] If they were trying to put me off [women's rights work], it did the opposite."

Phumzile Mlambo-Ngcuka, the executive director of UN Women, stated, "For a time, there was a conversation about whether 'feminism' was a good thing or a bad thing... [Her speech] gave us the word back." In 2015, Malala Yousafzai told Watson she decided to call herself a feminist after hearing her speech.

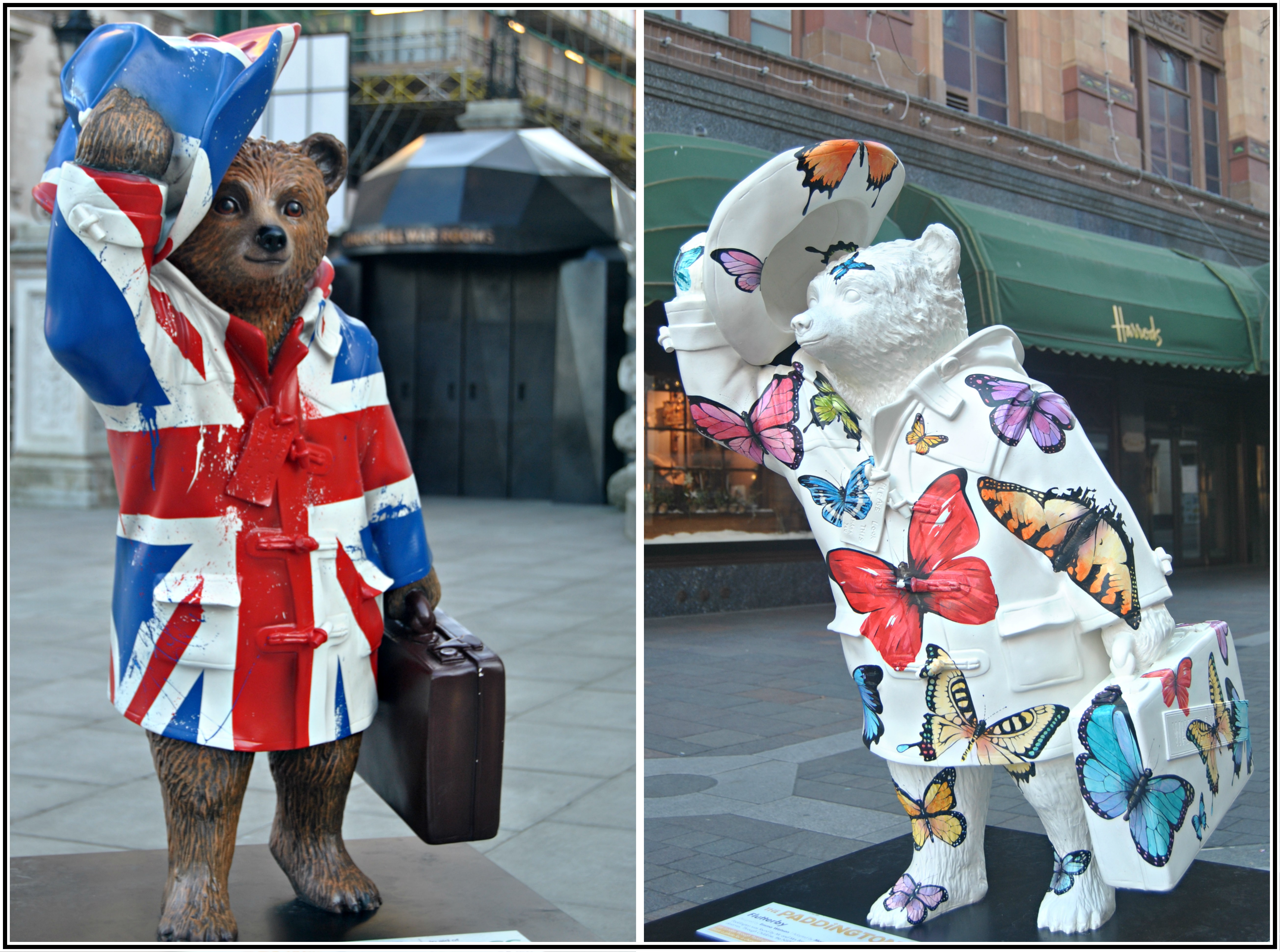
Watson's butterfly themed "Flutterby Bear" (right), one of fifty Paddington Bears along 'The Paddington Trail' in London, auctioned for the NSPCC

Also in September, Watson made her first country visit as a UN Women Goodwill ambassador to Uruguay, where she gave a speech at the Legislative Palace in Montevideo highlighting the need for women's political participation. In November 2014, Watson designed a Paddington Bear statue, one of 50 located around London prior to the release of the film Paddington, which was auctioned to raise funds for the National Society for the Prevention of Cruelty to Children (NSPCC). In December, the Ms. Foundation for Women named Watson its Feminist Celebrity of 2014, following an online poll. Watson also gave a speech about gender equality in January 2015, at the World Economic Forum's annual winter meeting.

Watson took the top spot on the AskMen "Top 99 Outstanding Women 2015" list on the strength of having "thrown her back" into women's rights issues. That same year, Watson was included on the Time 100 list of the world's most influential people, her first-ever appearance on the list. For its recap, former The New York Times editor Jill Abramson noted Watson's "gutsy, smart take on feminism" and called her effort to get men involved "refreshing".

Watson has cited Gloria Steinem and Maya Angelou as influences. In January 2016, Watson started a feminist Goodreads book club: Our Shared Shelf. The goal of the club is to share feminist ideas and encourage discussion on the topic. One book is selected per month and is discussed in the last week of that month. The first book to be selected was My Life on the Road by Steinem, whom Watson would later interview that February at the How to: Academy in London. Our Shared Shelf ceased updates in January 2020, but continues to be open as a discussion board for recommendations.

On 2016 International Day of the Girl Child, Watson visited Malawi to meet with traditional chiefs and girls who returned to school after being freed from child marriage. Watson has partnered with organisations such as Book Fairies and Books on the Underground to leave literature on public transit for consumption.

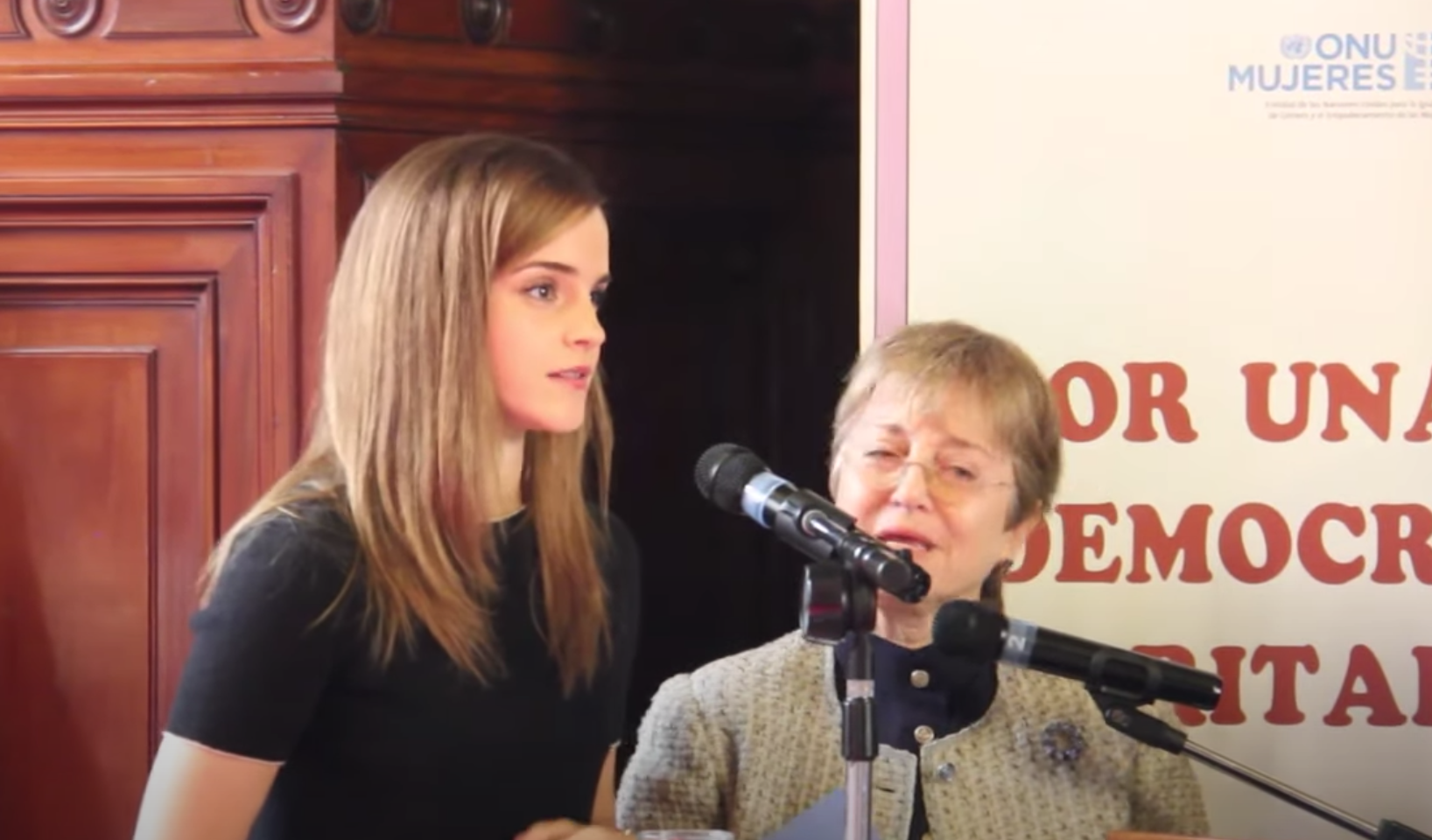
Watson delivering an address at the Legislative Palace of Uruguay as a UN Women Ambassador in 2014

In March 2017, Watson received backlash for a Vanity Fair photo shoot in which one of the shots had her breasts partly visible, for which some in the news media accused her of hypocrisy. Bemused by the controversy, she argued that "feminism is not a stick with which to beat other women" but is instead about freedom, liberation, and equality, adding, "I really don't know what my tits have to do with it."

Watson has discussed her white privilege in feminist spaces; in an interview with British Vogue, she commented, "I saw 'white feminism' coming up again and again, and I was like, 'Hey, this is clearly something that I have to meaningfully engage with. I have to understand this better". She wrote about intersectionality for Our Shared Shelf, discussing her self-reflection on "What are the ways I have benefited from being white? In what ways do I support and uphold a system that is structurally racist?"

=== Time's Up UK and advocacy against harassment ===
Watson is a founding member of Time's Up UK and coordinated its launch at the 71st British Academy Film Awards. Watson also assisted in the establishment of nationwide industry guidelines on bullying and harassment, implemented by the British Film Institute and British Academy of Film and Television Arts. She donated £1 million to Time's Up UK in February 2018 and later helped set up the organisation's Justice and Equality Fund in October, which donated to women's groups across the country. Marai Larasi, an activist on the issue of violence against women, was her guest to the 2018 Golden Globe Awards.

In July 2019, Watson helped launch a legal helpline for people who have suffered sexual harassment in the workplace. Legal advice is provided by Rights of Women, a charity which works to help women through the law. In the same year, she joined a G7 gender equality advisory group convened by the president of France, Emmanuel Macron, to "call on G7 to make political and economic advances for women within their own countries" as well as a "centerpiece of foreign policy". She attended their first meeting at the Élysée Palace in Paris in February and attended the 45th G7 summit in August as part of the committee.

In an interview with Paris Lees, she voiced her support for transgender rights, reiterating this on Twitter amidst controversy concerning Rowling's remarks on gender identity. Watson has spoken out in support of the Black Lives Matter movement; in June 2020, she shared anti-racism educational resources on social media in support of the George Floyd protests after initially participating in Blackout Tuesday, and uploaded a podcast episode onto Spotify interviewing Reni Eddo-Lodge about her book Why I'm No Longer Talking to White People About Race.

In July 2020, she partnered with Lodge and the WOW Foundation to spearhead a project reimagining the London Underground Map, renaming the 270 stops to spotlight women and non-binary people who have shaped the city's history. The initiative consulted writers, museums, and librarians and was published by Haymarket Books on International Women's Day 2021. Watson was among the 400 signatories in a letter calling for the UK government to include women in "decision-making roles" at the 2021 United Nations Climate Change Conference in Glasgow.

In June 2021, it was reported that Watson was part of a group of investors funding $12.5 million into FabricNano, a startup developing sustainable alternatives to petrochemical products.

=== Palestine ===
In January 2022, Watson showed support for the Palestine cause by posting an image of a pro-Palestinian protest with a "Solidarity is a verb" banner on Instagram. This received backlash from former Israeli science minister Danny Danon, who posted on Twitter, "10 points from Gryffindor for being an antisemite". Israeli ambassador to the UN Gilad Erdan also criticised her. Danon's comment was criticised by Leah Greenberg, a co-executive director of Indivisible Project and Conservative Party peer Sayeeda Warsi. More than 40 people, including Susan Sarandon, Mark Ruffalo, Miriam Margolyes, Gael García Bernal, Peter Capaldi, Maxine Peake, Viggo Mortensen, Steve Coogan, and Charles Dance, supported Watson in a letter organised by Artists for Palestine UK.

In September 2025, in an interview with Jay Shetty on his podcast, On Purpose with Jay Shetty, when asked about her views on the 7 October attacks and the Gaza war, she stated:

"This duality created where we don't seem able to care about the victims of terrorism and care about the genocide that's happening in Palestine at the same time, and both things have to be allowed to be true. You have to be allowed to care about 50,000 civilians dying, 17,000 of which are children, and care deeply about the victims of this awful terrorist attack."

=== Environmental and climate activism ===
Watson is an activist for environmental justice and climate change mitigation. In 2019, Swedish researchers from Lund University analysed the carbon footprints of 10 celebrities, including Watson's. Watson's carbon footprint was the lowest of the celebrities analysed, but her CO_{2} emissions from flying alone were still 15.1 tons of CO_{2} – three times the global average. At the 2021 United Nations Climate Change Conference in Glasgow, Watson hosted a panel on climate change with guests including climate activist Greta Thunberg.

== Public image and impact ==
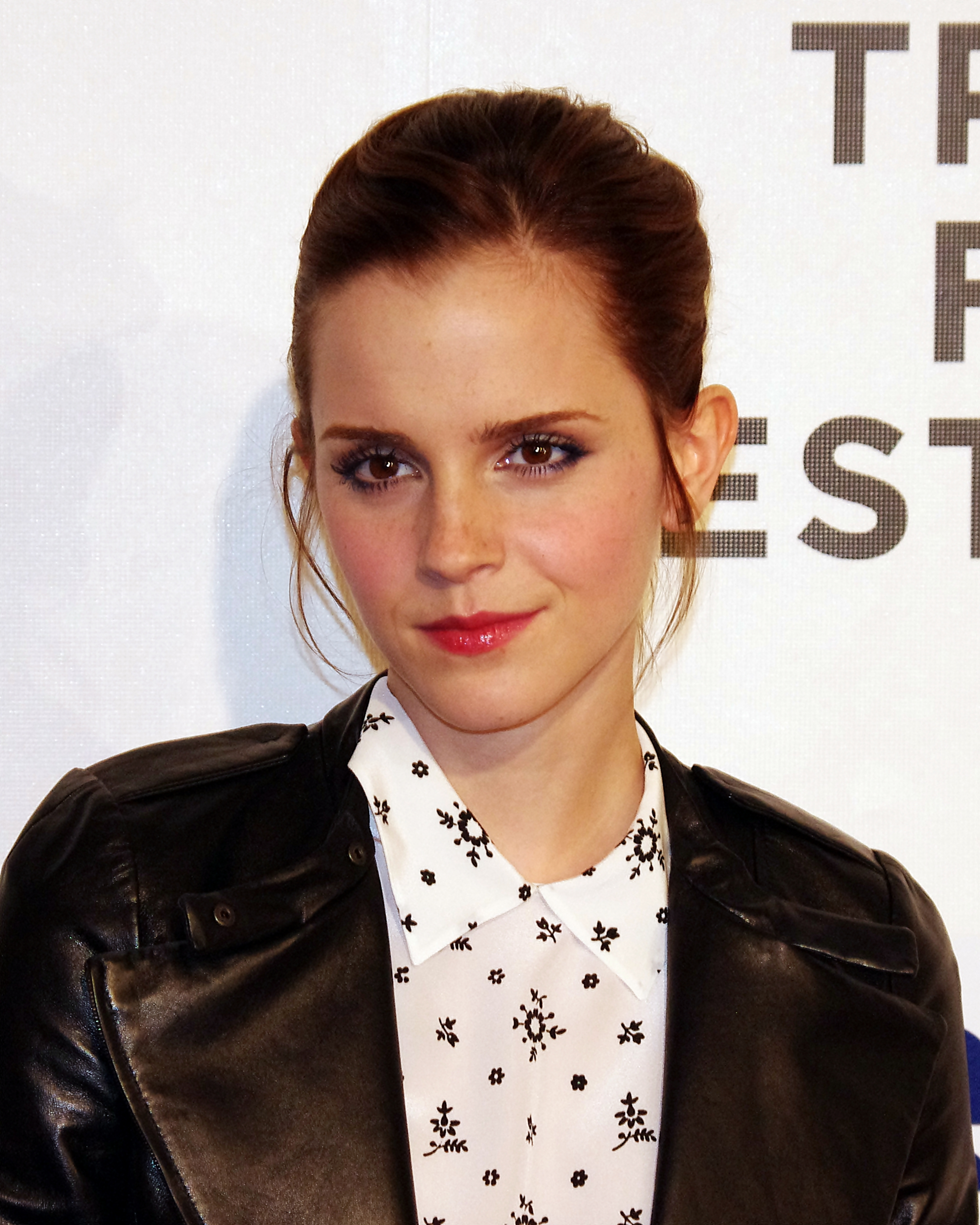
Watson at the 2012 Tribeca Film Festival

Watson has often been cited as a role model, though she shies away from the term, stating that "it puts the fear of God into [her]". Her impact on teenage girls' view of women's rights has been referred to as the "Emma Watson effect", with respondents from a National Citizen Service survey stating that her work in activism had inspired them to label themselves feminists. In her initial post-Harry Potter career, she focused on smaller films rather than big-budget studio films. Adam White of The Independent said Watson's acting style possesses "a very human sensitivity and quiet strength".

Describing Watson's off-screen persona, Derek Blasberg of Vanity Fair called her "shy", "friendly, intelligent, and down to earth". Steinem has described her as "way more like a real person than a movie star", while author bell hooks considers her to be part of "a very different, new breed [of actors] who are interested in being whole and having a holistic life, as opposed to being identified with just wealth and fame."

Watson's character in Harry Potter has had a significant impact on pop culture; the actress has commented, "I have met fans [with] my face tattooed on their bod[ies]. I've met people who used the Harry Potter books to get through cancer. I don't know how to explain it, but the Harry Potter phenomenon steps into a different zone." Watson has been the subject of media attention since the beginning of her career; on her 18th birthday, she was photographed by paparazzi attempting to take pictures up her skirt, and she has been victim of numerous stalking threats. Watson does not take selfies with fans, citing security concerns, and instead prefers to talk one-on-one during interactions.

In March 2009, she was ranked sixth on the Forbes list of "Most Valuable Young Stars" and in February 2010, she was Hollywood's highest-paid female star, having earned an estimated £19 million in 2009. In 2017, Forbes ranked her among the world's highest-paid actresses, with annual earnings of $14 million. In 2013, Watson was British GQ's Woman of the Year and topped Empire's list of the 100 sexiest movie stars. Watson was found to be the sixth most admired woman in the world in global surveys conducted by YouGov in 2020. In 2015 and 2016, Watson was selected twice for the annual Forbes 30 under 30 list.

== Business ventures ==
Outside of entertainment, Watson has pursued corporate governance and entrepreneurial roles, including serving on the board of directors for luxury group Kering and co-founding a sustainable spirits brand. In April 2023, Watson and her brother Alex launched Renais, a sustainable gin brand. The gin is made from recycled grape skins and is certified carbon neutral. The Watsons were inspired by their childhood in France and their father Chris Watson's wine business. The name Renais comes from the French word meaning "rebirth", and the gin is an ode to the Chablis wine region.

In September 2023, Watson and Alex won the Soho House Award for "Breakthrough Entrepreneur" for Renais. In January 2025, it was reported that the company raised $6 million for investment.

== Personal life ==
Watson was in a relationship with technology entrepreneur William Knight for almost two years, ending in 2017. She dated actor Chord Overstreet in 2018. (Note: Attributed to multiple references:) She was in a relationship with corporate executive Brandon Green from 2021 to 2023. (Note: Attributed to multiple references:)

When asked about her religious beliefs in 2014, Watson described herself as a spiritual universalist. After studying Buddhism, she began to practice meditation. In 2013, she became certified to teach yoga and meditation. As part of this certification, she attended a week-long meditation course at a Canadian facility, in which residents are not allowed to speak, in order "to figure out how to be at home with myself". Regarding her meditation training, she stated in an interview with Elle Australia that an uncertain future meant finding "a way to always feel safe and at home within myself. Because I can never rely on a physical place." In 2022, she went on a 10-day spiritual retreat in a Buddhist temple to take a vow of silence.

== Filmography ==
=== Film ===
Year	Title	Role	Notes	Ref.
2001	Harry Potter and the Philosopher's Stone	Hermione Granger		
2002	Harry Potter and the Chamber of Secrets	Hermione Granger		
2004	Harry Potter and the Prisoner of Azkaban	Hermione Granger		
2005	Harry Potter and the Goblet of Fire	Hermione Granger		
2007	Harry Potter and the Order of the Phoenix	Hermione Granger		
2008	The Tale of Despereaux	Princess Pea	Voice	
2009	Harry Potter and the Half-Blood Prince	Hermione Granger		
2010	Harry Potter and the Deathly Hallows – Part 1	Hermione Granger		
2011	Harry Potter and the Deathly Hallows – Part 2	Hermione Granger		
2011	My Week with Marilyn	Lucy Armstrong		
2012	The Perks of Being a Wallflower	Samantha "Sam" Button		
2013	The Bling Ring	Nicolette "Nicki" Moore		
2013	This Is the End	Herself		
2014	Noah	Ila		
2015	Colonia	Lena		
2015	Regression	Angela Gray		
2017	Beauty and the Beast	Belle		
2017	The Circle	Mae Holland		
2019	Little Women	Margaret "Meg" March		

=== Television ===
Year	Title	Role	Notes	Ref.
2007	Ballet Shoes	Pauline Fossil	Television film	
2015	The Vicar of Dibley	Reverend Iris	Episode: "The Bishop of Dibley"	
2022	Harry Potter 20th Anniversary: Return to Hogwarts	Herself	Television special	
2022	Pickled	Herself	Television special	

=== Music videos ===
Year	Title	Role	Artist	Ref.
2010	"Say You Don't Want It"	Lady	One Night Only	

=== Theme park attractions ===
Year	Title	Role	Ref.
2010	Harry Potter and the Forbidden Journey	Hermione Granger	

== Authored articles ==
- Watson, Emma; Mlambo-Ngcuka, Phumzile; Iversen, Katja; Kaufman, Michael (22 August 2019). "Every G7 country should have a feminist foreign policy". The Guardian.

== Recognition and accolades ==
Throughout her career, Watson has received several awards and nominations, including a Young Artist Award for her portrayal of Hermione Granger in Harry Potter and the Philosopher's Stone (2001). Additionally, she received nominations for three Critics' Choice Movie Awards, four Empire Awards, 14 MTV Movie & TV Awards (winning three), six People's Choice Awards (winning two), 12 Teen Choice Awards (winning eight).

Watson's efforts in activism and philanthropy, most notably her support of women's rights and her role in launching the UN Women campaign HeForShe, has received widespread media recognition and acclaim. Watson was listed among the 100 most influential people in the world by Time magazine in 2015. She has received several recognitions for her style, including the Style Icon award from British Elle and Best British Style at the British Fashion Awards.

== See also ==
- List of Harry Potter cast members
- List of women's rights activists from the United Kingdom
