= Just for Tonight (One Night Only song) =

2008 single by One Night Only

Single by One Night Only

from the album Started a Fire
- B-side: "Do You Know What I Mean?"; "Go On" (demo)
- Released: 21 January 2008
- Genre: Indie pop
- Length: 4:21
- Label: Mercury; Vertigo
- Songwriters: George Craig; Jack Sails; Daniel Parkin; Sam Ford; Mark Hayton
- Producer: Steve Lillywhite

One Night Only singles chronology
"You and Me" (2007)	"Just for Tonight" (2008)	"It's About Time" (2008)

"Just for Tonight" is a song by British indie rock band One Night Only from their 2008 debut album, Started a Fire. The song was released as the album's second single on 21 January 2008, reaching No. 9 on the UK Singles Chart and No. 4 on the Dutch Single Top 100.

== Background and composition ==
"Just for Tonight" is an indie pop song. In an interview with Digital Spy's Nick Levine, frontman George Craig explained that One Night Only were inspired to write the song after recording demos next to a power station that experienced an intense voltage spike, astounding the band. "We really wanted to put that huge, powerful vibe into a really anthemic song," Craig said, "and 'Just For Tonight' was the result." According to the sheet music, the song is written in common time with a key of D major and possesses a tempo of 140 beats per minute.

== Release and reception ==
Prior to its release, "Just for Tonight" served as the theme for the E4 television programme Nearly Famous. Following this exposure, Vertigo Records released the single in the United Kingdom on 21 January 2008. It debuted at number 49 on the UK Singles Chart six days later. The following week, the song rose to its peak of number nine, giving One Night Only their highest-charting single in the UK as well as their sole top-20 hit. It is also their longest-charting song, remaining in the top 100 for 17 weeks. It ended 2008 as the UK's 86th-best-performing single and was certified silver by the British Phonographic Industry (BPI) in October 2022 for sales and streaming figures exceeding 200,000 units.

In the Netherlands, the track was played during highlights of the 2008 UEFA European Football Championship, which took place from 7 to 29 June 2008, and the band performed an acoustic version during the tournament's final night. The song charted on both the Dutch Top 40 and the Single Top 100, peaking at number 10 on the former listing and number four on the latter in July 2008. The Dutch Top 40 placed the track at number 98 on its year-end ranking for 2008. In the Flanders region of Belgium, the song appeared on the Ultratip Bubbling Under chart, peaking at number 22 in May 2008.

== Music video ==
Following on from their successful video for the debut single, "You and Me", which was shot in their native Helmsley, the band kept faith with North Yorkshire locations and shot the video for "Just for Tonight" in various locations in Scarborough.

== Track listings ==
UK CD single

1. "Just for Tonight"
2. "Do You Know What I Mean?"

UK 7-inch single

A. "Just for Tonight"
B. "Go On" (demo)

UK 7-inch picture disc

A. "Just for Tonight" (original edit)
B. "Just for Tonight" (Seamus Haji Big Love dub edit)

== Charts ==
=== Weekly charts ===
Chart (2008)	Peak position
Belgium (Ultratip Bubbling Under Flanders)	22
Netherlands (Dutch Top 40)	10
Netherlands (Single Top 100)	4
Scotland Singles (OCC)	3
UK Singles (OCC)	9

=== Year-end charts ===
Chart (2008)	Position
Netherlands (Dutch Top 40)	98
UK Singles (OCC)	86

== Certifications ==
Region	Certification	Certified units/sales
United Kingdom (BPI)	Silver	200,000^{‡}
^{‡} Sales+streaming figures based on certification alone.
