= Harold McCarthy =

British film critic

Harold McCarthy (28 October 1892 – 1970) was an early and important British film critic.

McCarthy was an important, but largely forgotten film critic, as his work never reached the general public. Every week from 1932 to 1968, he produced single-sheet reports assessing the commercial viability of individual films for different audiences. These were available to cinema owners (usually independents) on a subscription-only basis. Managers of independent cinemas relied upon his judgements to choose what their audiences would see.

He reviewed more than 11,000 films, and the entire collection is now owned by the Bodleian Library, having been discovered by bookseller Ed Maggs. The story behind these reviews only emerged after McCarthy's younger son Brian McCarthy answered an appeal for information on Front Row, the BBC Radio 4 programme.

When he died in 1970, his local paper noted the passing of a loyal member of the Finchley Chrysanthemum Association, but neglected to mention his history as a film reviewer. He had also served during WW1 in the Honorable Artillery Company.

Harold McCarthy was married with 2 sons, Michael and Brian and had 5 grandchildren.

The Man from the McCarthy Agency was heard on BBC Radio 4 on 15 May 2008, presented by Matthew Sweet.
