= One Night Only (band) =

British indie rock band

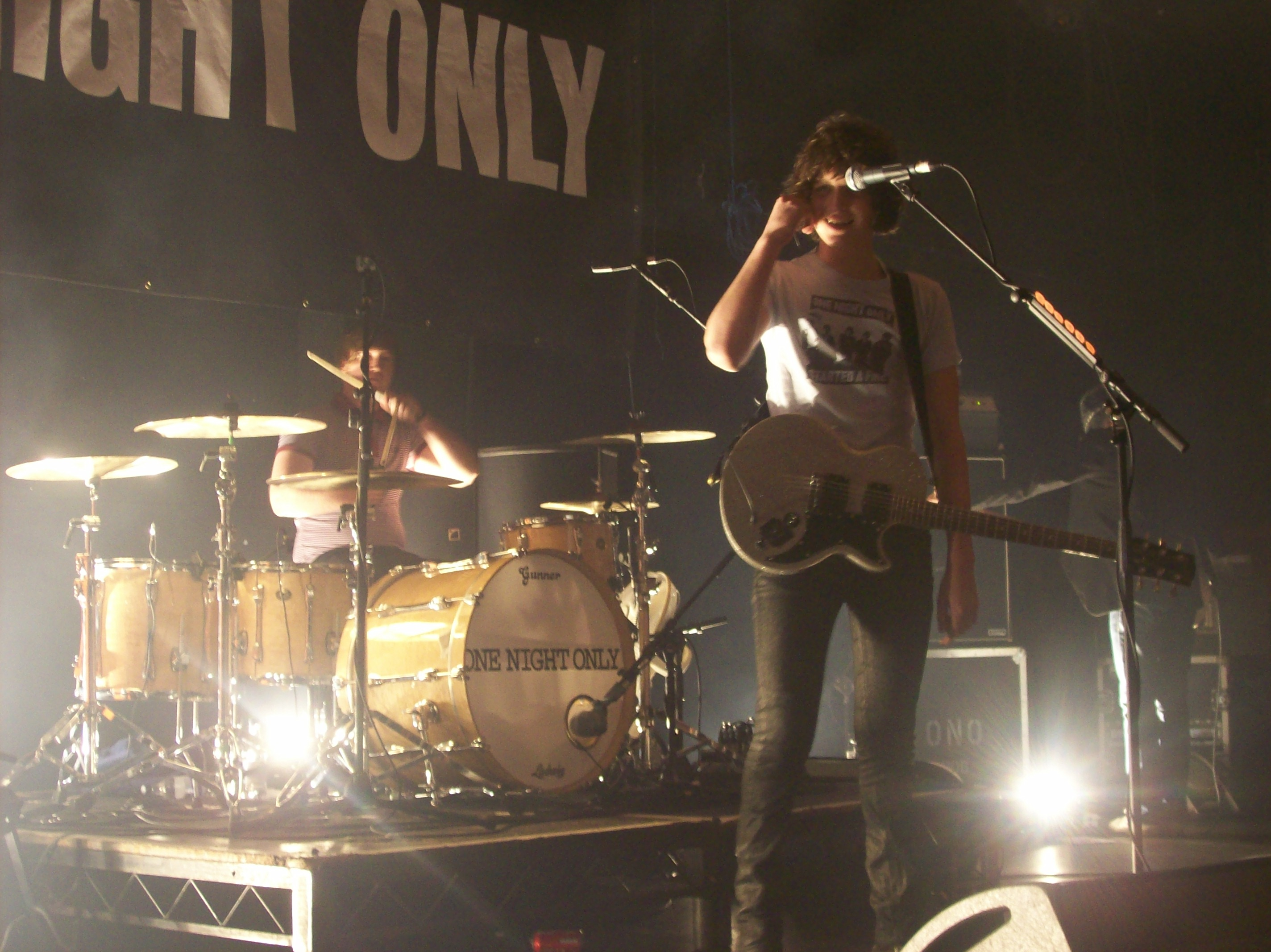
- One Night Only performing in 2008

Background information
- Origin: Helmsley, England
- Genres: Alternative rock, indie rock
- Years active: 2003–present
- Labels: Press Record, Vertigo, Mercury
- Members: George Craig; Jack Sails; Daniel Parkin; James Craig; Jonny Howe
- Past members: Kai Smith; Sam Ford; Mark Hayton

One Night Only are a British indie rock band from Helmsley, North Yorkshire, formed in 2003.

== History ==
One Night Only were formed in summer 2003, consisting initially of Mark Hayton, Daniel "Pob" Parkin, Sam "Gunner" Ford and Kai Smith. The band did not have a vocalist until George Craig, a friend of Ford's brother, joined in a practice. He was asked to be the vocalist, but insisted on playing guitar as well. Smith then left the band. Contrary to some reports, they did not start out as a Beatles cover band — they initially played songs by bands such as Blink-182, New Found Glory and The Beatles, as well as some of their own material.

The name, One Night Only, came about when they were asked to play a gig. They did not have a name at the time and so came up with One Night Only, intending the title to, literally, last for only one night, but the name stuck. They performed their first gig on 12 December 2003 in Kirkbymoorside Memorial Hall, which became a popular venue in their early days. In 2005, the keyboard player Jack "Fish" Sails joined the band. The band has appeared on The Friday Night Project, performing their third single "It's About Time". George Craig also appeared in Hollyoaks, performing an acoustic version of the same song.

In 2007, the band toured with Milburn and The Pigeon Detectives. Their first headline tour started in January 2008, ending in March. Their biggest headline tour to date took place in Autumn 2008. They have also played at festivals, including Isle of Wight, Oxegen and Glastonbury. Another tour, supported by the Northern Irish rock trio General Fiasco, Onlookers and other bands, at venues such as the Lincoln Engine Shed and The Astoria.

=== Started a Fire (2007–2008) ===
Their first album, Started a Fire, was recorded at RAK Studios in St John's Wood, London from August to September 2007. The album was produced by Steve Lillywhite, known for his work with U2. "You and Me" was their first single, released in October 2007. It failed to enter the Top 40 of the UK chart however, peaking at No. 46. "Just For Tonight", the second single to be released from their album, achieved better success, reaching No. 9 in the UK Singles Chart. The single was released on 28 January 2008, with the album being released a week later on 4 February 2008. "It's About Time", the third single, was released on 28 April 2008. It failed to reach the success of "Just For Tonight", peaking at No. 37 in the chart. On 7 July 2008, a fourth single, a re-release of "You And Me", was released, charting at No. 1 for five weeks in the UK Indie Chart.

=== One Night Only (2008–2010) ===
The band are said to have written over 25 new songs since releasing Started a Fire. Originally due to be released in the summer of 2009, the album was finally released in late August 2010. It was originally intended to include new songs such as "Intention Confidential", "A Thousand Dreams" and "Daydream" which were performed on their tour in October as well as "Live It Up" and "Hurricane" which had clips shown in a web video uploaded by them. None of these songs made the final track list, although "Daydream" and "Hurricane" were recorded as a B-side and an iTunes bonus track, respectively.

On 19 March 2010, the band's email newsletter and MySpace announced that recording of their second album was finished. The band also announced the departure of the drummer, Sam Ford. George Craig's brother, James Craig, formerly of Joe Lean and the Jing Jang Jong, was named as the band's new drummer in the same newsletter.

The band also performed new songs from their new album during their 2010 Austin, Texas, tour at the SXSW festival. Six new songs made appeared: "Chemistry", "Anything", "Forget My Name", "Say You Don't Want It", "Got It All Wrong" and "All I Want". On 12 May 2010, the band made an ONO Wednesday about their second album photo shoot.

The first single taken from the new album was "Say You Don't Want It" which was released on 16 August. A music video was released to accompany the song, featuring Emma Watson. On 22 August 2010, the song entered the UK Singles Chart at 23. The One Night Only album followed a week later on 23 August 2010. It peaked at No. 36 in the UK Albums Chart.

=== Where The Sleepless Go (2014-present) ===
On 19 September 2014 One Night Only released the first single "Get Around To It" from their third album Where The Sleepless Go which was released on 18 September 2015.

== Band members ==
Current

- George Craig – lead vocals, guitar (2003–present)
- Daniel Parkin – bass guitar (2003–present)
- Jack Sails – keyboards, backing vocals (2005–present)
- James Craig – drums (2010–present)
- Jonny Howe – guitar (2014–present)

Former

- Kai Smith – guitar (2003)
- Sam Ford – drums (2003–2010)
- Mark Hayton – guitar, backing vocals (2003–2014)

== Discography ==
=== Albums ===
- Started a Fire (2008) No. 10 UK, BPI: Gold
- One Night Only (2010) No. 36 UK
- Where The Sleepless Go (2015)

=== Singles ===
Year	Single	Chart positions		Certifications	Album
Year	Single	UK	NL	Certifications	Album
2007	"You and Me"	46	-		Started a Fire
2008	"Just for Tonight"	9	4	BPI: Silver	Started a Fire
2008	"It's About Time"	37	-		Started a Fire
2008	"You and Me" (re-release)	55	-		Started a Fire
2010	"Say You Don't Want It"	23	-		One Night Only
2010	"Chemistry" (withdrawn before release)	-	-		One Night Only
2011	"Can You Feel It"	-	-		One Night Only
2014	"Get Around to It"	-	-		Where the Sleepless Go
2014	"Plasticine"	-	-		Where the Sleepless Go
