= Started a Fire =

Studio album by One Night Only
- Released: 4 February 2008
- Recorded: August–September 2007
- Genre: Alternative rock
- Length: 39:44
- Label: Vertigo

One Night Only chronology
Started a Fire (2008)	One Night Only (2010)

Professional ratings
Review scores
Source	Rating
Allmusic	3/5 stars
NME	(5/10)

Started a Fire is the debut studio album by the British rock band One Night Only. It was released on 11 February 2008.

The album entered the UK Album Chart at number 10 and has had a certification of gold in the UK with sales over 100,000.

== Track listing ==
No.	Title	Length
1.	"Just for Tonight"	4:18
2.	"It's About Time"	3:26
3.	"You and Me"	3:24
4.	"He's There"	3:24
5.	"Start Over"	4:57
6.	"Time"	3:10
7.	"Stay At Home"	3:33
8.	"It's Alright"	3:22
9.	"Sweet Sugar"	4:21
10.	"Hide"	5:49

iTunes bonus track
No.	Title	Length
11.	"Just for Tonight" (Live)	4:20

== Certifications ==
Certifications for Started a Fire
Region	Certification	Certified units/sales
United Kingdom (BPI)	Gold	100,000^{^}
^{^} Shipments figures based on certification alone.

== Singles ==
"You and Me" was released as the debut single on 29 October 2007. It reached number 46 on the UK Singles Chart. The B-side for the CD is "What's Your Melody". The vinyl formats have either "Nintendo" or "Go Go Go". Their video for "You and Me" was posted on MySpace and was so well received that MySpace asked the band to make a short film, "One Night Only Welcomes You to Helmsley". A new video was produced to coincide with a rerelease of the single on 7 July 2008. The music video was produced by Agile Films and directed by Lucy Cash. British actress & model, Anna Brewster, plays the lead female opposite the band. It features the band caught in the middle of a large bar brawl and was filmed at The Palm Tree, Mile End. The fight director was Tim Klotz and features members of Scarlet blade theatre as the stunt team.
