= Antonio Napolitano (film critic) =

Italian film critic

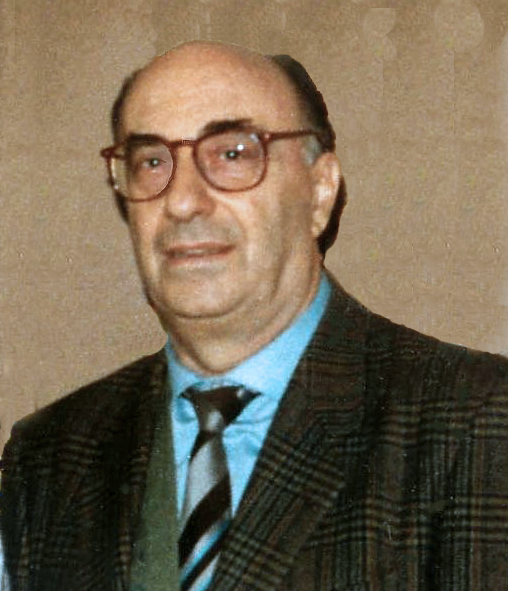
Antonio Napolitano

Antonio Napolitano (1928–2014) was an Italian film critic. He was born in Naples.

== Biography ==
Napolitano was born in Naples in 1928. From 1947 to 1959, he was a member and subsequently an executive of the Circolo napoletano del cinema and other cineclubs. From 1956 he began contributing essays to literature and cinema magazines, including L'Italia Letteraria, Il Letterato, L'Altro Cinema, and Cinema Sud.

Having worked as an English teacher, he went to England in 1959 to study a degree in General linguistics.

In 1960, he won the Pasinetti-Cinema Nuovo Prize, Venice, for an essay on Ingmar Bergman, and started writing for Cinema Nuovo, Civiltà dell'immagine in Florence, and later for Film critica in Rome. His work as a reviewer took him to Mostra di Venezia and festivals in Locarno, Karlovy Vary and others.

In 1961, he began teaching English Literature in Italian high schools. In 1969, he took a PhD degree in "Film history and criticism" and taught for several years in state and private universities.

From 1963 to 1975, he was on the managing committee of the Incontri internazionali del Cinema in Sorrento, the Italian Centre of Filmology.

Several of his essays have been translated into Danish, English, Russian, and American and quoted in foreign books on cinema.

== Bibliography ==
=== In English ===
- Neorealism in Anglo-Saxon cinema, in Italian neorealism and global cinema, edité par Laura E. Ruberto et Kristi M. Wilson, Wayne State University Press, Detroit, 2007, ISBN 978-0-8143-3324-2

=== In Italian ===
- Cinema e narrativa, Incontri internazionali del cinema, Naples 1965
- Film significato e realtà, Edizioni scientifiche italiane, Naples 1966
- Saggi di storia e critica del Cinema, La Buona Stampa, Naples 1969
- Robert J. Flaherty, La nuova Italia, Florence, 1975
- Mezzogiorno, questione aperta, Coll. per il Cinema, AA.VV., Bari, 1981
- Ideogrammi, Lalli Ed., Florence, 1990
- Il verde del Vomero, Lettere Italiane AGE, Naples 1997
- Totò, uno e centomila, Tempo Lungo, Naples 2001
- G. Leopardi. Un taccuino napoletano, Ist. Culturale del Mezzogiorno, Naples 2007
- Il memoriale di Seneca. Un galateo del ben vivere e del ben morire, Ist. Culturale del Mezzogiorno, Naples 2008
- Cinema d’autore off Hollywood, ed. Ist.Culturale del Mezzogiorno, Naples 2012
- https://xoom.virgilio.it/jump.html
