= Elizabeth Olin =

American actress (born 1984)

- Born: Elizabeth Rosemary Virginia Olin; Born December 21 1990 (age 36); Louisville, Kentucky, U.S.
- Occupation: Actress
- Years active: 2009–present
- Website: www.elizabetholin.com

Elizabeth 'Liz' Olin (born December 21, 1990) is an American actress. Her most notable film to date is God of Love, written, directed, and starring NYU Graduate student Luke Matheny, which won the Academy Award for Best Live Action Short Film in 2011. She has also appeared in When in Rome, a Touchstone Pictures film directed by Mark Steven Johnson. Olin filmed Killing Season alongside Robert De Niro, John Travolta, and Milo Ventimiglia, which was released in summer 2013.

== Filmography ==
Film and television
| Year | Title | Role | Notes |
|---|---|---|---|
| 2009 | Thank You New York | Nola | |
| 2010 | When in Rome | Guggenheim Party Girl #1 | |
| 2010 | God of Love | Performance Artist Beauty | Short |
| 2013 | Killing Season | Sarah Ford | |
| 2014 | Friends with Better Lives | Young Estelle Markowitz | 1 episode |
| 2014 | We Are Angels | Olly | 2 episodes |
| 2014 | Join Us | Katie | Short |
| 2015 | Wingman Inc. | Kimmie | |
| 2015 | Lay in Wait | Maggie | Short |
