= Ryan Silbert =

American filmmaker, writer, and producer

- Education: Cornell University; New York University
- Occupations: Film producer, writer, and director
- Years active: 2005-current
- Website: http://www.originstory.com

Ryan Silbert is an American filmmaker, writer, and producer, as well as the founder of Origin Story Entertainment, a multi-platform entertainment company with a global focus on storytelling. He is the producer of multiple award-winning films, including 2010 Academy Award for Best Live Action Short Film winner God of Love and 2012 Canadian Screen Award for Best Live Action Short Drama winner Doubles with Slight Pepper.

== Biography ==
Silbert was born in Manhattan, New York and moved to Port Washington, New York at age seven. He graduated from Cornell University before enrolling in the New York University Tisch School of the Arts graduate program in film.

Beginning his career as a producer in 2005, Silbert's credits include a number of acclaimed films and short films, including Holy Rollers starring Jesse Eisenberg, Some Velvet Morning starring Stanley Tucci and Alice Eve, and A Birder's Guide to Everything starring Ben Kingsley and co-written by Luke Matheny. Silbert also produced Matheny's God of Love, which won the Academy Award for Best Live Action Short Film. Silbert is the co-creator of one of the final projects developed by comic book legend Stan Lee, an immersive audiobook titled Stan Lee's Alliances: A Trick of Light starring Yara Shahidi.

Silbert is a voting member of the Producers Guild of America, National Board of Review, and Academy of Canadian Cinema & Television; as well as an associate member of the British Academy of Film and Television Arts and on the regional selection committee for the Student Academy Awards. He serves on the Cornell Communication Advisory Board and Cornell University Council and was previously a creative director at public relations firm Bratskeir & Company, where he led campaigns for Hasbro, Jim Beam, and L’Oreal.

== Selected filmography ==
- God of Love (2010) - Producer
- Holy Rollers (2010) - Co-Producer
- Doubles with Slight Pepper (2011) - Producer
- Some Velvet Morning (2013) - Executive Producer
- A Birder's Guide to Everything (2013) - Executive Producer
- The Girl Is in Trouble (2015) - Producer
