= Killing Season (film) =

- Theatrical release poster
- Directed by: Mark Steven Johnson
- Screenplay by: Evan Daugherty
- Produced by: Paul Breuls
- Starring: John Travolta; Robert De Niro; Milo Ventimiglia; Elizabeth Olin
- Cinematography: Peter Menzies Jr.
- Edited by: Sean Albertson
- Music by: Christopher Young
- Production companies: Nu Image; Millennium Films
- Distributed by: Corsan Pictures; FilmEngine
- Release date: July 12, 2013
- Running time: 91 minutes
- Country: United States
- Language: English
- Box office: $1.1 million

Killing Season is a 2013 American action thriller film written by Evan Daugherty and directed by Mark Steven Johnson for Millennium Films, as the first on-screen pairing of John Travolta and Robert De Niro. The film pertains to a personal fight between an American and a Serb war veteran. Daugherty's script caught the attention of producers after winning the 2008 Script Pipeline Screenwriting Competition. The film received negative reviews from critics.

== Plot ==
During the Bosnian War, American troops witness atrocities and shoot Serb soldiers whom they hold accountable.

In present-day Belgrade, Serbia, former Scorpions soldier Emil Kovač, who survived the shootings, meets his informant to retrieve a file on American military veteran and former NATO operative Colonel Benjamin Ford.

Meanwhile, Ford has retreated to a cabin in Sevier County, Tennessee, to try to forget the war. Now a recluse, Ford meets Kovač, posing as a European tourist, during a hunting trip. The two men become friendly until Kovač reveals his true identity.

Intent on revenge, Kovač initiates a gory game of cat-and-mouse with Ford. The latter is badly injured but is quick to rebound. It is revealed that Ford shot Kovač in the back, crippling him for years.

After a showdown, Kovač is overpowered by Ford. They reach a peaceful compromise, however, after understanding each other's predicament. Kovač quietly returns to Serbia, happily stating, "I am healing", when the injuries to his face are shown while Ford visits his son, who is making up for missing his grandson's baptism.

== Cast ==
- Robert De Niro as Colonel Ben Ford (Ret.)
- John Travolta as Emil Kovač
- Milo Ventimiglia as Chris Ford
- Elizabeth Olin as Sarah Ford
- Diana Lyubenova as Elena
- Kalin Sarmenov as Serbian
- Stefan Shterev as Bar Customer

== Production ==
The project was originally set in the 1970s and titled Shrapnel. It was being considered by John Travolta and Nicolas Cage as a project to follow up on their film Face/Off and by director John McTiernan as a directing vehicle. Subsequently renamed and modified to take place in modern-day Appalachia, and co-financed and co-produced by Corsan, Nu Image and Millennium Films, filming began on January 16, 2012, in the Appalachian Mountains of northern Georgia. Major filming was scheduled for Tallulah Gorge State Park and Black Rock Mountain State Park. The locations in Rabun County were chosen by director Mark Steven Johnson to create the effect and mood that he had previously seen in the film Deliverance. Other minor filming locations included Sofia, Bulgaria, Sweetwater Creek State Park, and the Pine Mountain Gold Museum in Stockmar Park, Villa Rica. International sales for Killing Season, offered by the American Film Market, commenced on November 2, 2011, in Santa Monica. American cellist/singer/songwriter Ben Sollee contributed solo cello performances as well as an original song, "Letting Go", for the end credits.

== Release ==
Killing Season was released in the United States on July 12, 2013, in a limited release and through video on demand.

=== Critical response ===
On Rotten Tomatoes, the film has an approval rating of 10%, based on reviews from 20 critics. On Metacritic, the film has a score of 29 out of 100, based on reviews from 9 critics, indicating "generally unfavorable" reviews.

Boyd van Hoeij of The Hollywood Reporter wrote that the film would be better off as a "small-screen item". Joe Neumaier of the New York Daily News awarded the film one star out of five, panning Travolta's character's Serbian accent.

David DeWitt of The New York Times stated that "[i]t's not worthless, but it's not good. As a genre film, it's too ambitious; as an art film, it's too obvious."

Peter Sobczynski of RogerEbert.com called it "badly written, ineptly staged, horribly acted, historically suspect and boring beyond belief".

Variety's Alissa Simon wrote, "The sight of Robert De Niro and John Travolta sharing the screen for the first time reps the one and only selling point of Killing Season."
