= Tallulah Gorge =

Canyon in Georgia, US

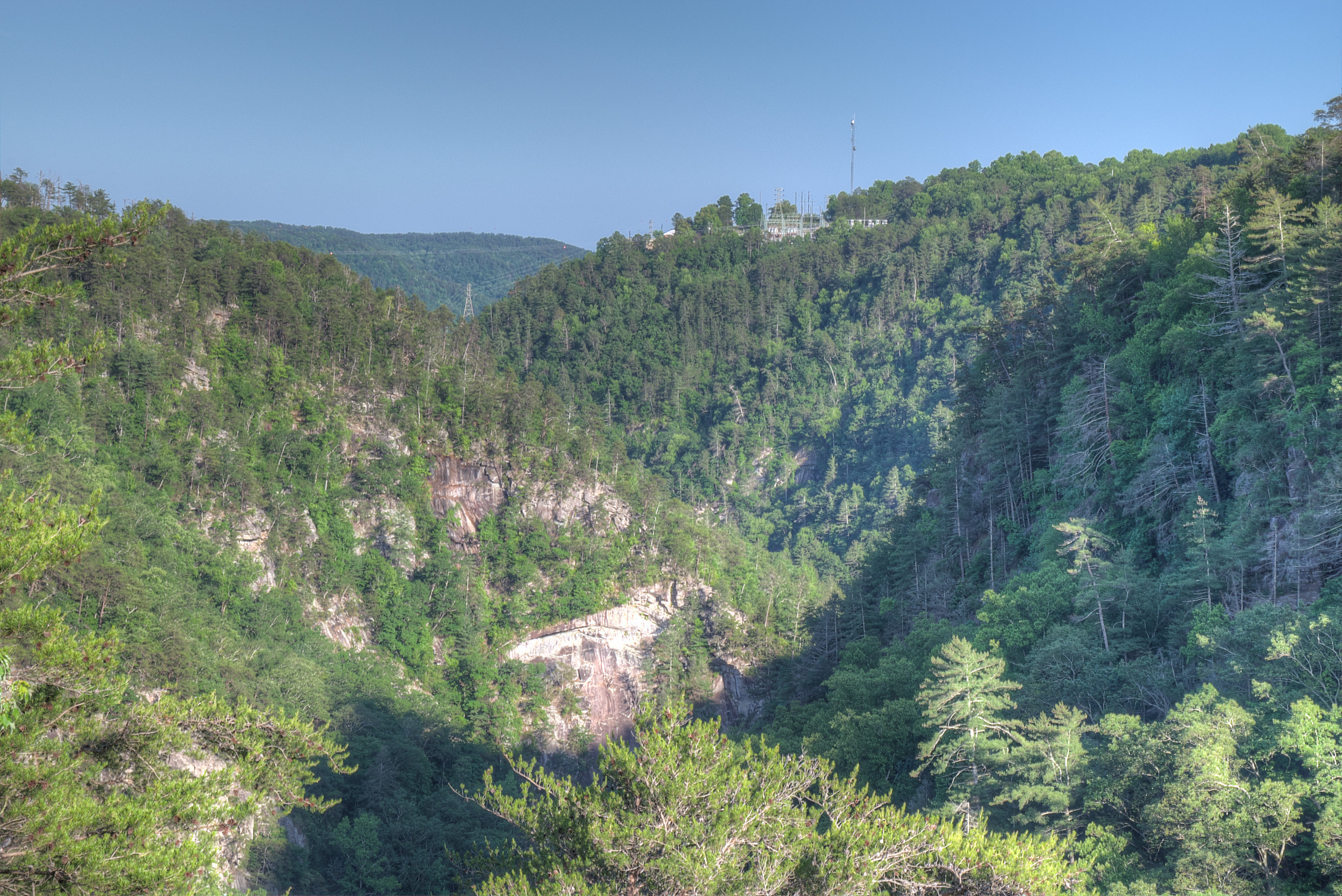
- View of Tallulah Gorge from an overlook

- Location within Georgia
- Length: 2 m (6 ft 7 in)
- Depth: 1000 ft (300 m)

Geography
- Location: Tallulah Falls, Georgia, U.S.
- Coordinates: 34°43′30″N 83°22′13″W
- River: Tallulah River
- Interactive map of Tallulah Gorge

The Tallulah Gorge is a canyon in the southern Appalachian Mountains of the U.S. state of Georgia. Located near the town of Tallulah Falls in the northeastern part of the state, the gorge was formed by the Tallulah River as it cut through the Tallulah Dome rock formation. It measures approximately 2 miles (3 km) long and almost 1,000 feet (300 m) deep. Georgia's Tallulah Gorge State Park protects much of the gorge and its waterfalls. The Tallulah Gorge has been dubbed one of the "Seven Natural Wonders of Georgia".

Tallulah Falls Lake lies just above the gorge. It was created in 1913 by a hydroelectric dam built by Georgia Railway and Power (now Georgia Power) in order to run Atlanta's city streetcars. The dam still collects most of the water from the falls via a 6,666-foot (2,032 m) tunnel sluice or penstock around the falls. It then redirects the water to a 72 MW hydropower electricity generation station downstream. This station lies at an elevation 608 feet (185 m) below the lake, but a few days each year the dam releases water and the river's water levels rise considerably. The days when water is released are especially popular for recreation, including kayaking and whitewater rafting.

== History ==
Since the early 19th century, Tallulah Gorge and its waterfalls have been a tourist attraction. In 1882, Tallulah Falls Railway was built, increasing the accessibility of the area to visitors from Atlanta and elsewhere in Georgia, and the gorge became North Georgia's leading tourist attraction. Resort hotels and bars sprang up to serve the tourist trade, which, after the addition of the railway, swelled to as many as 2,000 people on any given Sunday. In 1883, tightrope walker Professor Bachman crossed the gorge as part of a publicity stunt for a local hotel. On July 18, 1970, Karl Wallenda became the second man to walk across the gorge on a tightrope.

In the 1910s, Georgia Railway and Power began building dams on the river. The town of Burton, Georgia was purchased and its residents relocated. The area was cleared and then flooded to become Lake Burton in 1919. Many nearby residents opposed the dams, including Helen Dortch Longstreet, widow of Confederate general James Longstreet, who led an unsuccessful campaign in 1911 to have Tallulah Gorge protected by the state. The Georgia Assembly was unable to raise the $1 million required to purchase the gorge, but Mrs. Longstreet's efforts are among the first recorded conservation movements in Georgia. Once the dam was completed in 1913, the roar of the Tallulah Falls (which could be heard for miles from the gorge) was quieted, and tourism dwindled. A state park was created by Georgia governor Zell Miller in cooperation with Georgia Power.

== Etymology ==
Georgians have long assumed that "Tallulah" was a Cherokee word, given the prominence of Cherokee history in the extreme northern part of the state. The word's etymology remains uncertain, and it does not clearly match either Cherokee or nearby Muscogean languages such as Creek. In his book Georgia Place-names, Kenneth K. Krakow cites John Mooney, an authority on the Cherokee language who traced the name from the Native American word "talulu" or "taruri" but concluded that both forms are untranslatable. Krakow also mentions that the American actress Tallulah Bankhead (1902–1968) was named for her grandmother, who was named after Tallulah Falls.

== Tallulah Falls in popular culture ==
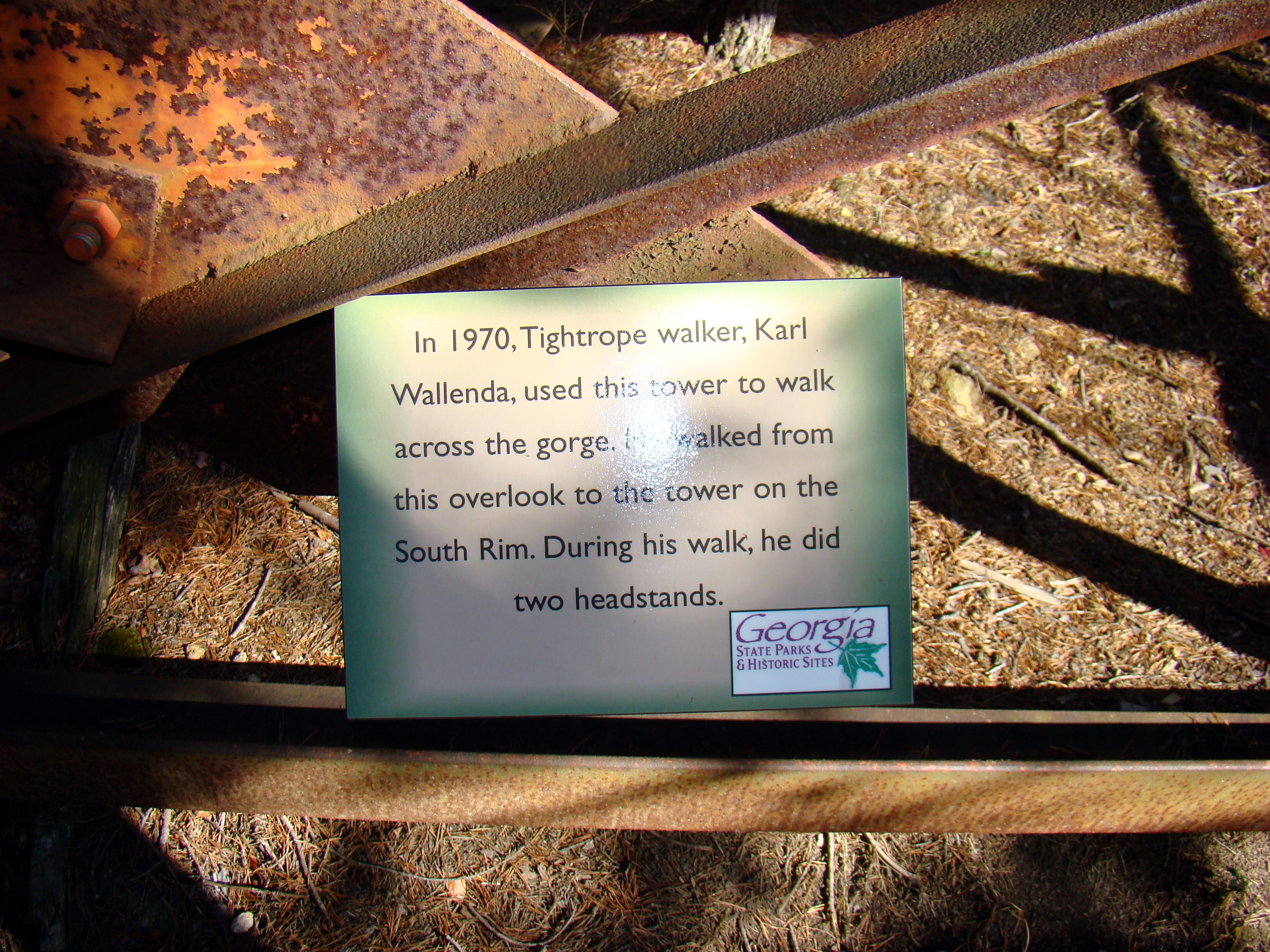
Site marker at Tallulah Gorge State Park commemorating Karl Wallenda's 1970 high-wire walk

- The opening credits of the 1976 film Grizzly were filmed while flying through the gorge, and several key shots were taken in one of the gift shops on the gorge rim.
- On July 18, 1970, the then 65-year-old Karl Wallenda performed a high-wire walk across the Tallulah Gorge. The iron towers which held the cable are still in place, though the northern tower has been intentionally toppled onto its side for safety reasons.
- Parts of the 1972 film Deliverance were filmed in the gorge.
- Portions of the 2018 film Avengers: Infinity War were filmed in the state park.

== Geology and ecology ==
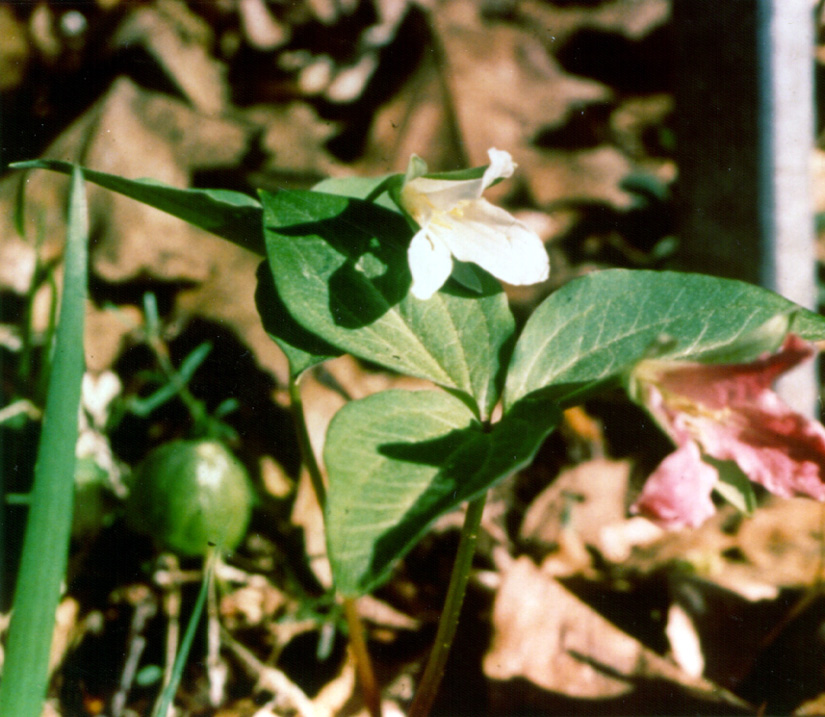
Persistent trillium

Tallulah Dome is a rock formation caused by the double folding of the Earth's crust during the formation of Pangaea, about 500 to 250 million years ago. The dome is made up of mostly quartzite along with schist.

Because of the variation in sunlight, shade, and moisture caused by the steep cliffs, several different ecosystems exist in and around the canyon-like gorge. The persistent trillium, an endangered species of trillium, grows in this river basin and only a few other parts of the South Carolina/Georgia area.

== Additional photographs ==
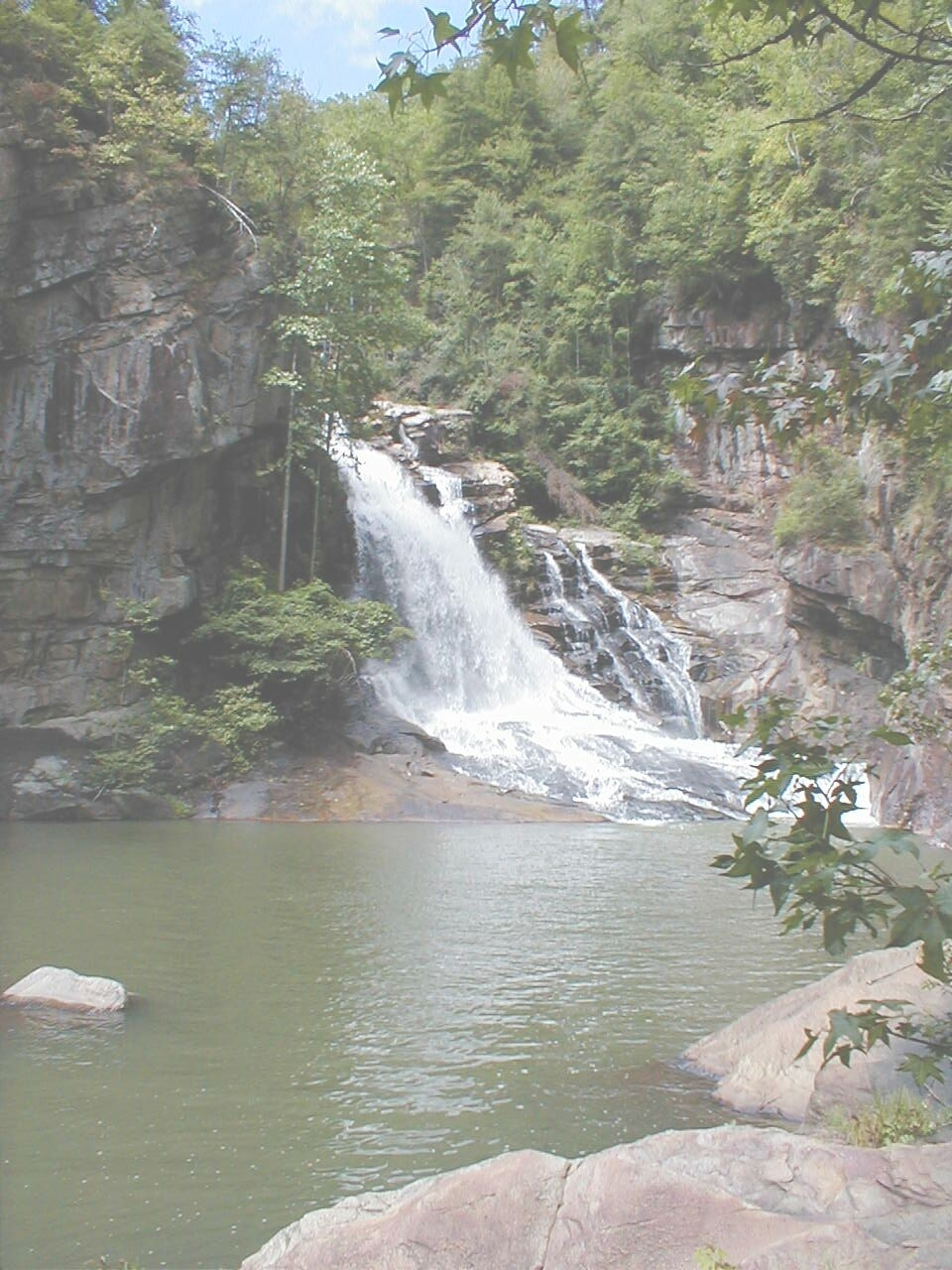
Tallulah Falls in 2006

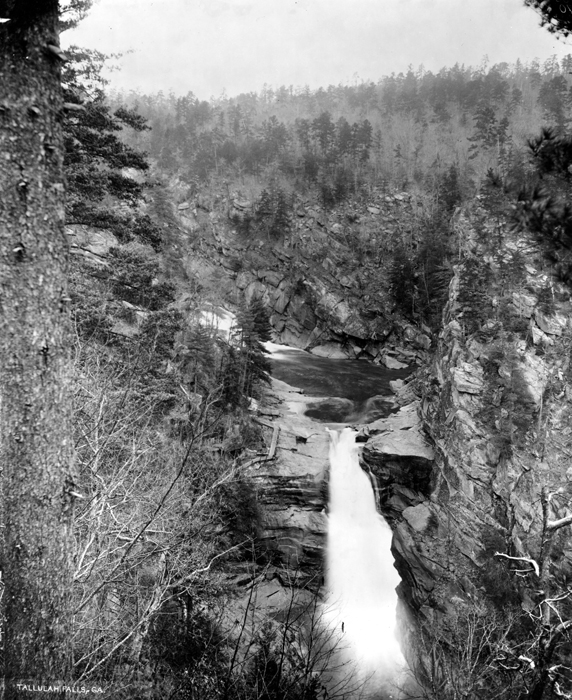
Tallulah Falls circa 1894

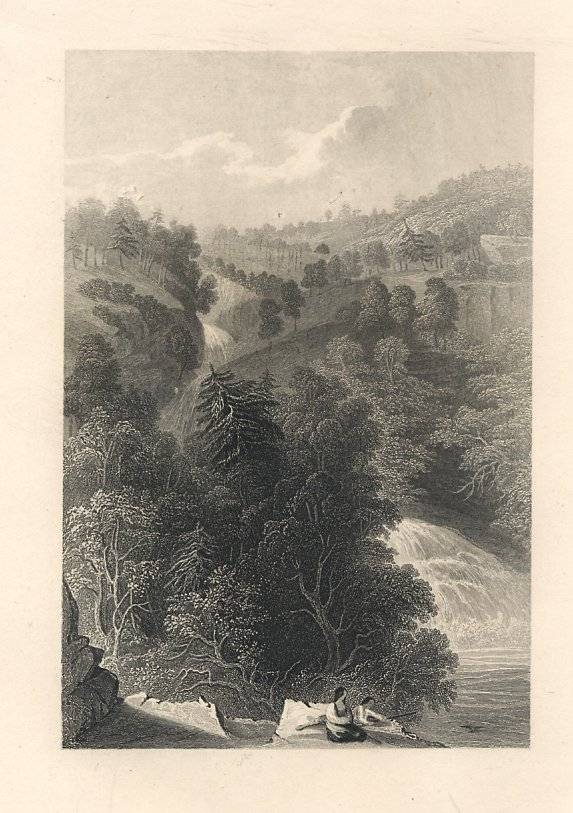
Tallulah Falls 1854 by Addison Richards

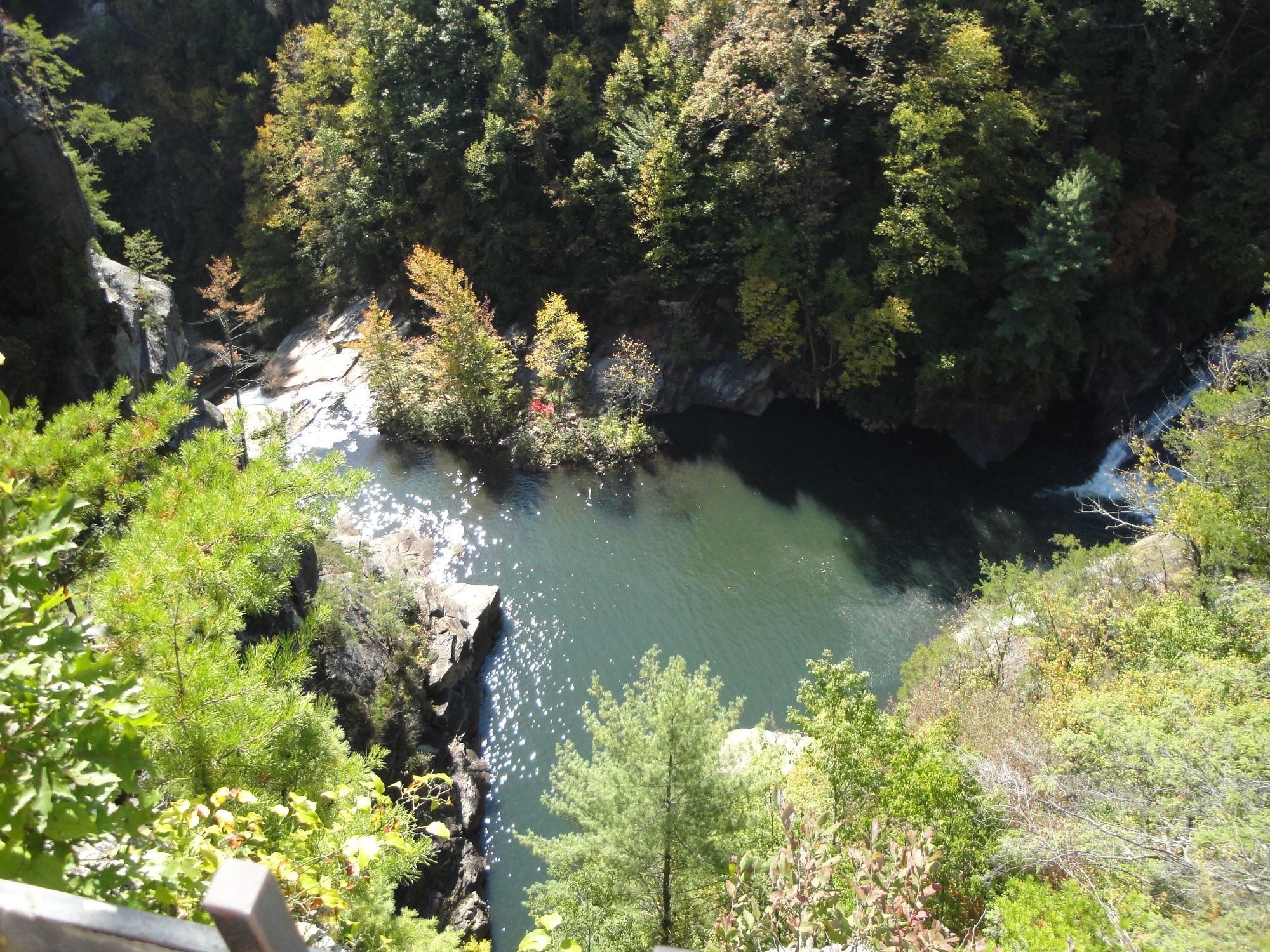
Hawthorne Pool inside Tallulah Gorge State Park

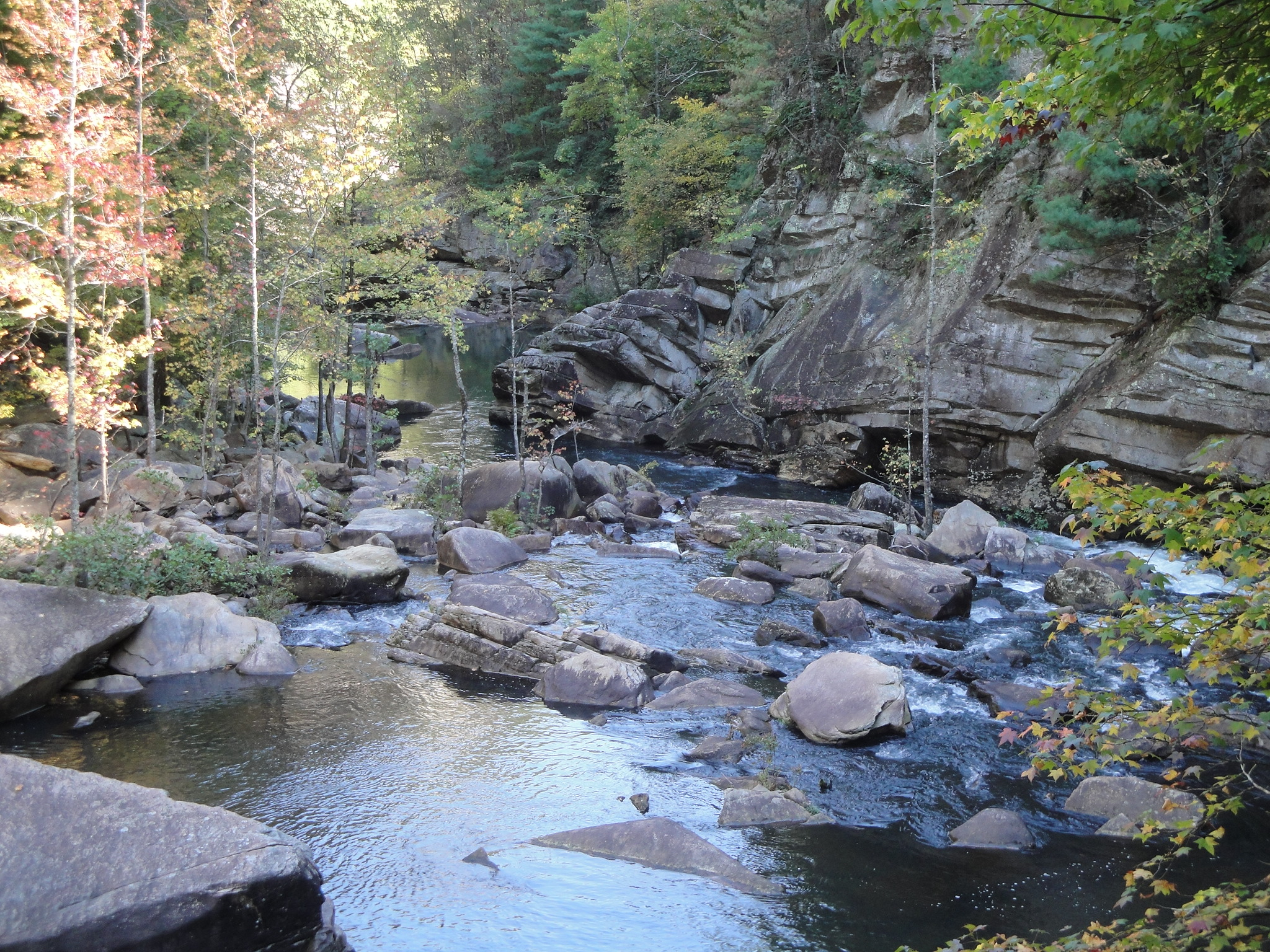
View of the Tallulah River at the bottom of the gorge

== Sources ==
- Edwards, Leslie. "Tallulah Gorge Article." Georgia Botanical Society. Accessed January 20, 2006.
- Georgia Botanical Society-Home Page
- Tallulah Falls and Gorge, New Georgia Encyclopedia
- Tallulah Gorge State Park, About North Georgia
