= Helen Dortch Longstreet =

American social advocate, librarian, and newspaper woman

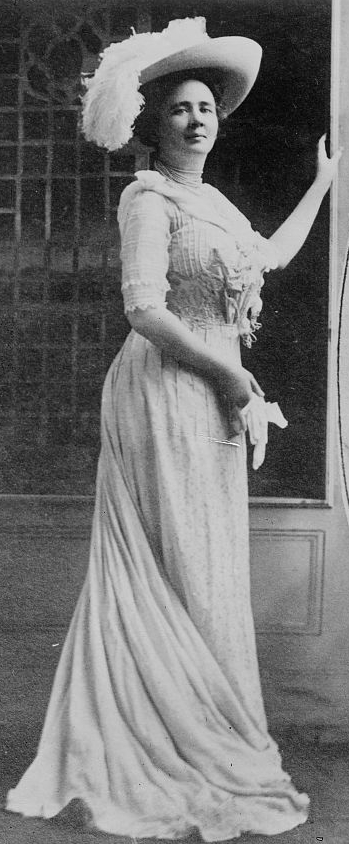
- Photo in George Grantham Bain Collection (Library of Congress)
- Born: Helen J. Dortch; April 20, 1863; Carnesville, Georgia, C.S
- Died: May 3, 1962 (aged 99); Milledgeville, Georgia, U.S.
- Resting place: Westview Cemetery, Atlanta, Georgia, U.S.
- Other name: "Ellen"
- Education: Gainesville Seminary; Notre Dame of Maryland University
- Occupations: Social advocate; librarian; newspaper woman
- Spouse: James Longstreet (m. 1897; died 1904)

Helen Dortch Longstreet (née, Dortch; April 20, 1863 – May 3, 1962), known as the "Fighting Lady", was an American social advocate, librarian, and newspaper woman serving as reporter, editor, publisher, and business manager. She was the first woman who tried to secure a public office in the state of Georgia. She was the second wife of Confederate general James Longstreet. She earned her nickname from being a champion of causes such as preservation of the environment and civil rights. She is also remembered for her work as a Confederate memorialist and postmistress. In Governor William Yates Atkinson's first campaign, she rendered him valuable service by her vigorous editorials. Her fight to have women made eligible to the position of State Librarian was the first successful movement in the State of Georgia toward breaking down the prejudice against women holding high political positions. Dortch Longstreet was the proprietor and editor of two weeklies, Vice-President of the Georgia Weekly Press Association, Secretary of the Woman's Press Club of Georgia, and Assistant Librarian of the State of Georgia. She was also the leader of the movement to have the University of Georgia opened to women, was an advocate of modern industrial education, and took interest in the advancement of the women of her State and country.

== Early life and education ==
Helen (nickname, "Ellen") Dortch was born in Carnesville, Georgia, on April 20, 1863. (Note: Willard & Livermore state January 25, 1868 as date of birth.) She descended from an old North Carolina family notable in the political and war history of that State. Her father, James Speed Dortch (died August 1891) was a lawyer in the northeast part of the state and, also edited the Carnesville Tribune. She was the only daughter and was the idol of his heart. He directed her education and she grew up as his friend and companion, and was as much at home with law books as in literature.

She attended Gainesville Seminary (now Brenau University) for a year. In 1885, she was back at home and began publishing the Tribune, while the father remained as editor. She returned to school 1887–89, studying at Notre Dame of Maryland University.

== Career ==
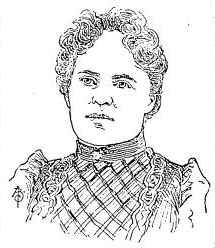
Ellen J. Dortch

=== Early career ===
Dortch became the owner and editor of the Carnesville, Georgia, Tribune in 1888, when the establishment consisted of 150 pounds of long primer type, mostly in "pi", a few cases of worn adverting type and a subscription book whose credit column had been conscientiously neglected. She replaced them with new and improved ones, and the circulation of the paper increased to thousands. She had been typist, editor and business manager, and had solicited and canvassed the district for subscribers, because she was not able to hire any one to do it for her. Beginning the work at the age of 17, she fought the boycotters and Alliance opponents and overcame the southern prejudice against women using their intelligence in the business world. After working for two years, she went to Baltimore, Maryland, where she studied for two years in the Notre Dame school. She resumed her work on the Tribune in June, 1890.

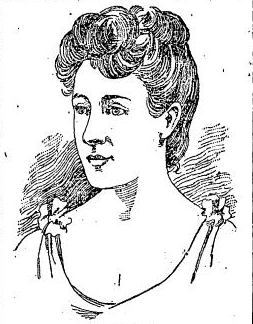
Ellen J. Dortch

In October 1894, it was announced that Dortch, editor at that time of the Milledgeville Chronicle, was to become the private secretary of Governor Atkinson. This office carried with it a major's commission in the state militia.

She was the first woman in Georgia to serve as Assistant State Librarian in 1894. She also authored the "Dortch Bill" (which became law in 1896) to allow a woman to hold the office of State Librarian.

=== 1897 and later ===
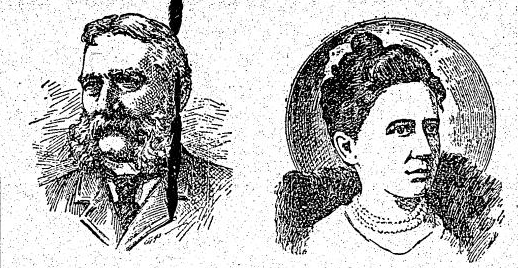
General Longstreet and Ellen Dortch Longstreet

Having met General James Longstreet, through her school roommate, she married him on September 8, 1897, when she was just 34 and he was 76. She was widowed in 1904, childless.

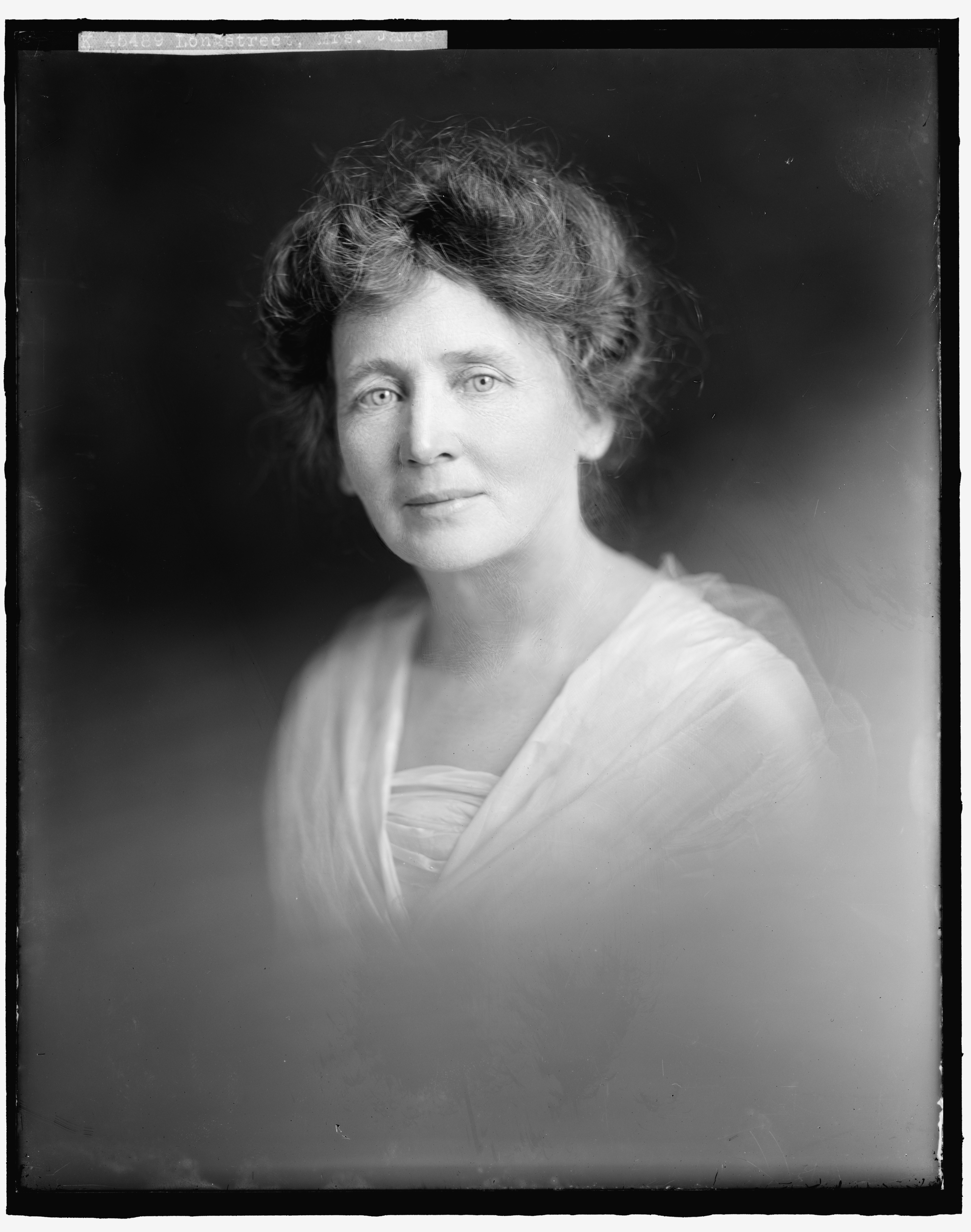
Ellen Dortch Longstreet, 1905. From the Library of Congress Prints and Photographs division

Before and after her husband’s death, Longstreet spent much time addressing how General Longstreet was portrayed in historical accounts. In 1905, she documented her husband's account of the Civil War by publishing the book Lee and Longstreet at High Tide. Another important cause that she took up about 1911 was the creation of a state park at Tallulah Gorge. Dortch Longstreet was opposed to a plan by Georgia Power to build a series of hydroelectric dams along the original course of the Tallulah River and particularly concerned about the potential impact on the Tallulah Gorge. Although unsuccessful, her campaign was one of the first conservation movements in Georgia.

During World War II, she was a riveter at the Bell Aircraft plant in Atlanta. She said, "I was at the head of my class in riveting school. In fact I was the only one in it."

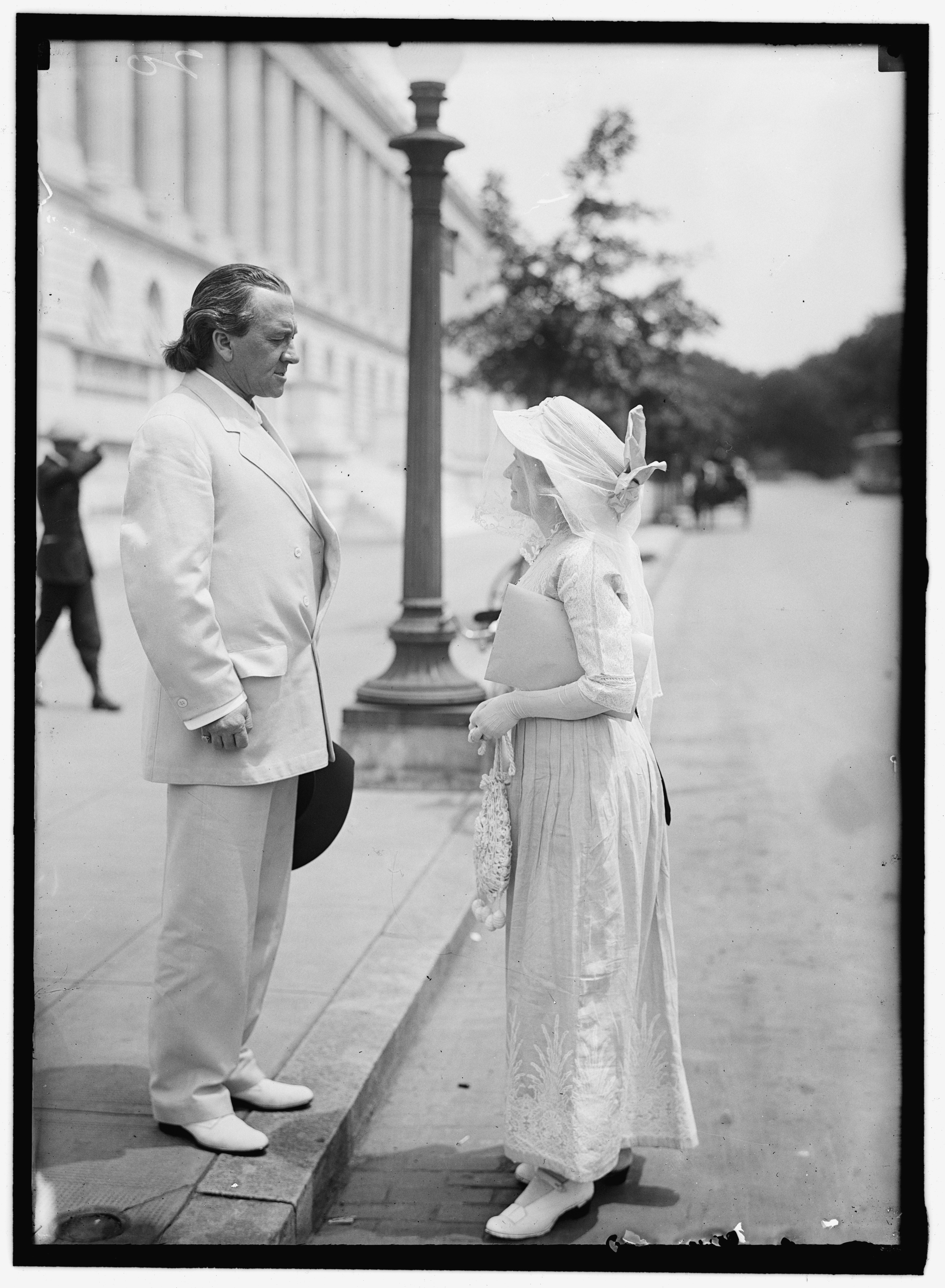
Ellen Dortch Longstreet with Mississippi Sen. James K. Vardaman, Washington, D.C., 1913. From the Library of Congress Prints and Photographs division

Longstreet was also politically active. She became a member of the Progressive Party and supported Theodore Roosevelt when he lost the Republican nomination to Taft in 1912. In fact, she was a delegate to the Progressive Party convention in 1912. She ran an unsuccessful write-in campaign for governor of Georgia against Herman Talmadge in 1950.

== Death and legacy ==
From 1957, she lived in the Central State Hospital in Milledgeville, Georgia, where she died May 3, 1962; burial was in West View Cemetery, Atlanta, Georgia.

She received a number of honors. In 1947, she became the first woman to have her portrait placed in the State Capitol. When the Tallulah Gorge State Park was finally created in 1993, it was done in her honor and the trails in the park were named the Helen Dortch Longstreet Trail System in 1999. Dortch Longstreet was inducted in the Georgia Women of Achievement in 2004 according to GWA files.

== Selected works ==
- Lee and Longstreet at High Tide : Gettysburg in the Light of the Official Records , 1902
- Helen Dortch Longstreet collection, 1904-1941
- Longstreet, Helen Dortch Papers, 1904-1963
- Helen Dortch Longstreet broadside, circa 1911-1913
- In the path of Lee's "Old War Horse", 1917
- Travail of the new slavery, 1917
- Helen Dortch Longstreet photograph collection, [ca. 1920-1940].
- Trail of the spoilsmen in the Gainesville, Ga., Post Office, 1922(?)
- The Great American: General James Longstreet, 1953
- Lee and Longstreet at High Tide., 1969
