= Connie Sawyer =

American actress (1912–2018)

- Sawyer, circa 1940s
- Born: Rosie Cohen; November 27, 1912; Pueblo, Colorado, U.S.
- Died: January 21, 2018 (aged 105); Woodland Hills, California, U.S.
- Resting place: Hillside Memorial Park Cemetery
- Occupation: Actress
- Years active: 1920s–2014
- Spouse: Marshall Schacker
- Children: 2

Connie Sawyer (born Rosie Cohen; November 27, 1912 – January 21, 2018) was an American stage, film, and television actress, affectionately nicknamed "The Clown Princess of Comedy". She had over 140 film and television credits to her name, but was best known for her appearances in Pineapple Express, Dumb and Dumber, and When Harry Met Sally.... At the time of her death at age 105, she was the oldest working actress in Hollywood, with a career spanning 85 years, and was the oldest member of the Screen Actors Guild and the Academy of Motion Picture Arts and Sciences.

== Early life ==
Connie Sawyer was born as Rosie Cohen on November 27, 1912 in Pueblo, Colorado, to Orthodox Jewish parents. Her father, Samuel Cohen, and mother, Dora Inger, were from Romania. Both of her parents came from the same village in Romania, but her mother arrived first in the United States. When she was 7, the family moved to Oakland, California, where her father opened an army-navy store.

== Professional career ==
Sawyer's mother loved showbusiness and encouraged Sawyer to learn singing and dancing, and entered her into talent competitions as a child. In her first competition, a song and dance routine, at the age of 8, she won third prize and was given a stack of pies. She attended Roosevelt High School in Oakland and was the first woman to be senior class president. Following graduation, Sawyer won a radio contest (first place this time) which came with a chance to perform on a radio variety show in San Francisco titled “Al Pearce and His Gang,” a show which gave her the opportunity to develop her own comedy routine.

At the age of 19, Sawyer moved to New York and performed in nightclubs and vaudeville theaters. Sawyer and a few friends worked their way across the country (literally), staying in each city along the way and performing for several weeks. Once in New York she met Sophie Tucker, who connected Sawyer with a comedy writer, and she began to travel with her show. In the 1950s she began to appear on television, including The Milton Berle Show and The Jackie Gleason Show.

In the late 1950s, agent Lillian Small, who worked for Frank Sinatra, saw Sawyer in the Broadway show A Hole in the Head, playing "Miss Wexler". Sinatra later optioned the rights for a film version and hired Sawyer to reprise her role in the 1959 film production, which starred Sinatra, Edward G. Robinson, and Eleanor Parker. Sawyer continued to appear regularly on television, in such series as The Mary Tyler Moore Show, Laverne & Shirley, The Rockford Files, Hawaii Five-O, Dynasty, Murder, She Wrote, Home Improvement, Seinfeld, Boy Meets World, Will & Grace, Welcome Back, Kotter, ER, How I Met Your Mother, and Ray Donovan. In 2007, Sawyer appeared in the HBO series Tell Me You Love Me with Jane Alexander; however, Sawyer, later expressed regret as she considered the show to be pornographic. In 2012, the year of her centenary, she appeared on 2 Broke Girls, and, in recognition of her birthday, she was a guest on The Tonight Show with Jay Leno. Past 100 years of age, she appeared on television in NCIS: Los Angeles (2013), and, opposite Zooey Deschanel, in New Girl (2014), as "the Oldest Woman in the World". In 2014, she also appeared in two films: Lovesick and the short film Entanglement.

=== Autobiography ===
In September 2017, Sawyer self-published an autobiography, I Never Wanted to Be a Star — and I Wasn't, describing her life in Hollywood.

== Later life ==
For 12 years, Sawyer lived at the Motion Picture & Television Fund’s Motion Picture & Television Country House and Hospital, a residential complex for entertainment industry retirees in Los Angeles, where she remained an active member of the Academy of Motion Picture Arts and Sciences, continuing to watch all Oscar-nominated films before placing her votes each year.

=== Personal life and death ===
Sawyer was married to film distributor Marshall Schacker for ten years, later separating. They had two daughters together, Lisa and Julie.

Sawyer suffered a heart attack and later died at her home at the Motion Picture & Television Fund’s retirement community in Woodland Hills, California on January 21, 2018, aged 105.

== Filmography ==
Year	Title	Role	Notes
1959	A Hole in the Head	Miss Wexler	
1961	Ada	Alice Sweet	
1966	The Last of the Secret Agents?	Florence	Uncredited
1966	For Pete's Sake!		
1967	The Way West	Mrs. McBee	
1969	True Grit	Talkative woman at hanging	Uncredited
1969	Bob & Carol & Ted & Alice	Waitress	Uncredited
1971	Five Desperate Women	Mrs. Brown	TV movie
1972	Evil Roy Slade	Aggie Potter	TV movie
1972	The Strangers in 7A	Mrs. Layton	TV movie
1975	The Man in the Glass Booth	Mrs. Levi	
1977	Oh, God!	Mrs. Green	
1978	Foul Play	Screaming Lady	
1979	Fast Break	Mom	
1979	...And Justice for All	Gitel	
1984	The Rosebud Beach Hotel	Carlotta	
1985	Hot Chili	Mrs. Houston	
1987	Nights in White Satin	Martha	
1989	Far From Home	Viney Hunt	
1989	When Harry Met Sally...	Documentary Couple #1	
1990	Blue Desert	Elderly lady	
1990	The End of Innocence	Grandma	
1990	The Bonfire of the Vanities	Ruskin Family member	
1992	The Opposite Sex and How to Live with Them	Waitress from Hell	
1994	Roseanne and Tom: Behind the Scenes	Motel Clerk	TV movie
1994	Murphy Brown	Woman on Elevator	
1994	Dumb and Dumber	Elderly lady	
1995	Scorpion Spring	Diner Waitress	
1996	It Came From Outer Space II Dave's World (TV series)	Mrs. Otis Alice Bondurant	TV movie Season 4 Episode 8
1998	Out of Sight	Old Elevator Lady	
1998	Where's Marlowe?	Skip's mother	
1999	Becker	Mrs. Yudelson	Episode: Partial Law
2000	That 70's Show	Aunt Pearl	Episode: Kelso's Serenade
2002	The Trip	Barbara Baxter	
2002	Staring at the Sun	Grace	Short
2003	View from the Top	Grandma Stewart	
2003	Something's Gotta Give	Lady at the market	
2004	Promised Land	Hazel	
2005	Complete Guide to Guys	Senior Wife	
2006	Relative Strangers	Old Lady	
2006	ER	Second Old Lady	Episode: "Twenty-One Guns"
2007	Kiss the Bride	Aunt Minnie	
2008	Pineapple Express	Faye Belogus	
2009	The Office	Nana Scott	Episode: "Dream Team"
2010	Watch Out for Slick	Gussie	
2014	Lovesick	Nana Bebe	
2014	Entanglement	Rose	Short, (final film role)

== See also ==
- List of centenarians (actors, filmmakers and entertainers)
