= Charlotte's Web (miniseries) =

2025 animated miniseries

- Based on: Charlotte's Web by E. B. White
- Screenplay by: Luke Matheny
- Directed by: Yurie Rocha
- Voices of: Amy Adams; Elijah Wood; Cynthia Erivo; Danny Trejo; Randall Park; Keith David
- Narrated by: Jean Smart
- Countries of origin: United States; Canada
- Original language: English
- No. of episodes: 3

Production
- Executive producer: Luke Matheny
- Producer: Emily Lindsay
- Production companies: Guru Studio; Sesame Workshop

Original release
- Network: HBO Max
- Release: October 2, 2025

Charlotte's Web is a 2025 animated miniseries based on the 1952 book of the same name. It was released on HBO Max on October 2, 2025. First announced in 2022, the series took several years to release.

== Cast ==
- Jean Smart as the narrator
- Amy Adams as Charlotte
- Elijah Wood as Adult Wilbur
- Griffin Robert Faulkner as Wilbur
- Cynthia Erivo as Goose
- Natalie Chan as Fern
- Danny Trejo as Gander
- Randall Park as Templeton
- Chris Diamantopoulos as Homer
- Rosario Dawson as Edith
- Ana Ortiz as Dolores
- Tom Everett Scott as John
- Leith Burke as George
- Keith David as Old Sheep
- Patricia Richardson as Widow Fussy
- Dee Bradley Baker voices various animals

== Production ==
On March 8, 2022, it was reported that Sesame Workshop was working on an animated miniseries based on the book Charlotte's Web. It was in production for a few months, and was slated to premiere in 2024 on Cartoon Network and HBO Max. According to Luke Matheny, the series was at one point planned to consist of six episodes, each 22 minutes long, before it was changed to three 45-minute episodes. In November 2022, it was alleged that the miniseries would not be moving forward. However, Canadian animation studio Guru Studio declared in April 2023 it was still in production. It was reported in June 2025 that the series had wrapped production.

== Release ==
The entire miniseries was released on HBO Max on October 2, 2025.
