= Lovesick (2014 film) =

2014 film by Luke Matheny

- Theatrical release poster
- Directed by: Luke Matheny
- Written by: Dean Young
- Produced by: Travus Pope; Josh Goldstein; Michael Roiff
- Starring: Matt LeBlanc; Ali Larter; Adam Rodriguez; Chevy Chase
- Cinematography: Bobby Webster
- Edited by: Levi Abrino
- Music by: Sasha Gordon
- Production companies: Full Blitz Entertainment; Night & Day Pictures
- Distributed by: Gravitas Ventures
- Release dates: April 24, 2014 (NBFF); February 6, 2015 (United States)
- Running time: 85 minutes
- Country: United States
- Language: English

Lovesick is a 2014 American romantic comedy film directed by Luke Matheny (in his feature directorial debut) and written by Dean Young. It stars Matt LeBlanc as a man who tries to prevent his strange psychological condition from affecting his new relationship. Ali Larter, Adam Rodriguez, and Chevy Chase appear in supporting roles.

== Plot ==
Charlie Darby has everything going for him: a great job, friends, family, the whole package. The one thing Charlie doesn't have is love, because every time he gets close, he goes clinically insane. When he meets the perfect girl, Charlie must overcome his psychosis to claim his chance at true love.

== Cast ==
- Matt LeBlanc as Charlie Darby
- Ali Larter as Molly Kingston
- Adam Rodriguez as Jason Kerwick
- Ashley Williams as Felicia
- Rebecca Naomi Jones as Nancy Kerwick
- Carsen Warner as Timmy Clark
- Connie Sawyer as Bebe
- Cameron Richardson as Michelle
- Richard Riehle as Father
- Jennifer Rhodes as Mother
- Rachael Harris as Roberta
- Kristen Johnston as Katherine
- Chevy Chase as Lester Horn
- Bella Spencer as Becky (Kid)
- Gudino Santiago as Matt (Kid)
- Raymond Ochoa as Shane (Kid)
- Carmina Garay as Sharon (Kid)
- Madison Wenn as Amy (Kid)
- Scott Michael Morgan as Will
- Brian Drolet as Josh
- Sorita Andrade as Hannah
- Elizabeth Ho as Tanya
- Louise Griffiths as Jacinda
- Vincent Giovanni as Antonio
- Laura James as Italian Woman
- Jason Scott Jenkins as Concierge
- Kate Gorney as Ballet Teacher

== Production ==
In May 2012, it was announced that Matt LeBlanc was set to star in Lovesick, which would mark the feature directorial debut of Luke Matheny. In July 2012, Adam Rodriguez and Rachael Harris joined the cast alongside LeBlanc, Ali Larter, Chevy Chase, and Kristen Johnston.

Dean Young penned Lovesick in about a month, with the story based loosely on his experiences. The film was produced by Michael Roiff of Night & Day Pictures, Travus Pope of Full Blitz Entertainment, and Josh Goldstein, while Young served as an executive producer.

Principal photography took place in Los Angeles, California in July 2012.

== Release ==
Lovesick had its world premiere as the opening night film of the 15th Newport Beach Film Festival on April 24, 2014. It was released in select theaters and on iTunes and VOD on February 6, 2015, by Gravitas Ventures.

== Reception ==
=== Critical response ===
On the review aggregator website Rotten Tomatoes, 29% of 14 critics' reviews are positive, with an average rating of 3.2/10. Metacritic, which uses a weighted average, assigned the film a score of 31 out of 100, based on 6 critics, indicating "generally unfavorable" reviews.

Jeannette Catsoulis of The New York Times wrote that "this soulless, sterile romantic comedy has slipped under the wire to give audiences a headache and Matt LeBlanc's reputation a relapse." Gary Goldstein of the Los Angeles Times stated that "although Lovesick plays more like an extended sitcom episode than a full-fledged feature film, the script by Dean Young contains enough genuine laughs and amusing moments to keep this slight romantic farce afloat."

=== Accolades ===
| Year | Award | Category | Recipient | Result | Ref. |
|---|---|---|---|---|---|
| 2016 | 37th Young Artist Awards | Best Performance in a Feature Film – Leading Young Actor (10 and Under) | Carsen Warner | Nominated | |
