= God of Love (film) =

- Film poster
- Directed by: Luke Matheny
- Written by: Luke Matheny
- Produced by: Gigi Dement; Ryan Silbert; Stefanie Walmsley; Stephen Dypiangco
- Starring: Luke Matheny; Christopher Hirsh; Marian Brock; Emily Young; Miguel Rosales; Elizabeth Olin; Francesca McLaughlin; Mark Gessner; David Ross; Andrea Mustain; Priya Dewan; Katherine E. Scharhon
- Cinematography: Bobby Webster
- Edited by: Levi Abrino
- Music by: Sasha Gordon
- Distributed by: Topic
- Release date: June 12, 2010 (Student Academy Awards)
- Running time: 18 minutes
- Country: United States
- Language: English

God of Love is a 2010 American live action short film written and directed by Luke Matheny, and produced by Gigi Dement, Ryan Silbert, and Stefanie Walmsley. The film was shot in black and white on the Red One camera by director of photography Bobby Webster.

In the film, a lounge singer and championship dart player named Raymond Goodfellow is desperately in love with a bandmate, but she only has love for his best friend. The crooner prays daily to God for a way for his beloved to fall in love with him. One evening, his prayers are answered when he's given a box of magical darts with Cupid-like powers. Raymond decides to use the darts to make his own love connection.

The film is included as a special feature in the Blu-ray release of 127 Hours.

== Plot ==
Raymond Goodfellow rides on a country road on his motor scooter. His voice over explains, “You can’t control who you love. You can't control who loves you. You can't control where it happens, or when it happens, or why it happens. You can't control any of that stuff.”

The film flashes back to three months earlier to Ray's time as a confident, self-centered lounge singer/dart-thrower. Ray's band consists of his friends Fozzie (guitar), Frank (stand-up bass) and the “love of his life” Kelly (drums). Before he joins the band onstage, Ray prays to God asking him for assistance in getting Kelly to love him. Despite Ray's ongoing affection to her, she ignores him and is hopelessly in love with Fozzie; but Fozzie steadfastly rejects her many advances out of loyalty to Ray, who is his best friend.

After Ray's crowd-pleasing performance, he is informed by the bartender that someone has left a package for him. The package contains “love darts.” The instructions for the darts explain that when someone is poked with love dart, they are immediately attracted to the first person they see. This attraction lasts for 6 hours. At the end of the 6 hours, if the love is meant to last, it will; but if the love wasn't meant to be, it will be like it never happened.

Ray tells Fozzie about the darts and they both agree to have a test run. While the band walks home from a gig, Ray throws a love dart at a prissy Jersey Girl named Angela. The first man she sees is Ray's quiet, low-key bandmate, Frank. Just as the instructions promised, Angela falls in love with Frank immediately. Ray and Fozzie follow the new couple around. After exactly six hours, Angela appears to still be in love with Frank, and Ray realizes that the darts are real.

Ray enlists Fozzie's help in creating the “most romantic six hours” ensuring that Kelly will remain in love with Ray after the love dart's initial power ends. Fozzie, though believing the love darts to be immoral, is able to offer several tips, knowing a surprising amount about Kelly and the things that are important to her. Ray goes to Kelly's house and strikes her with a dart, which makes her immediately fall in love with him. Their date goes perfectly, and towards the end of the six hours they kiss. When the six hours end, Kelly looks uncomfortable, thanks him for the evening, and awkwardly leaves, proving that their love isn't meant to be.

Fozzie insists that this is proof that Ray needs to get over Kelly, and encourages him to try dating one of the many other women in the city. Ray throws darts at nearly every woman he passes, including one man, all of whom fall in love with him and follow him around. However, he is still unable to get over Kelly, and his "flock" of lovestruck passersby encourage him to pursue her. He debates convincing Kelly that she has diabetes just so he can prick her with darts for the rest of their lives.

Later, while walking home from another gig with his band, Ray prepares for his final throw at Kelly. Before he prepares to throw the dart, he realizes that Fozzie really does love Kelly, but will never pursue his feelings due to Ray's obsession. Moved, Ray chooses to hit Fozzie with the dart right as he looks over at Kelly, causing them to instantly fall in love. A wiser and less self-centered Ray returns to his apartment. He finds another mysterious box outside his apartment with a note from "Olympus" that says “nice work.” He opens the box and finds Cupid’s bow and arrow.

The film flashes forward three months, to where the film began. The band continues but without Ray; Angela, who had confessed a love of singing to Frank, is the new singer. Frank and Angela are still deeply in love, as are Kelly and Fozzie, and it's revealed that Ray found romantic partners for the other characters introduced in the film. Ray is many miles away in an undisclosed location, with a bow and arrow tied to his back. In a voiceover, he apologizes to the viewer for situations where love doesn't seem to make sense, owing it to him sometimes being "an idiot," and repeats his earlier thoughts on love. He knows all this because “I am the God of Love.”

== Cast ==
- Luke Matheny as Ray
- Marian Brock as Kelly
- Christopher Hirsh as Fozzie
- Emily Young as Angela
- Miguel Rosales as Frank
- Mark Gessner as Bartender
- Bradley Harris as Other Bartender
- Francesca McLaughlin as French Beauty
- David Ross as Trevor
- Elizabeth Olin as Performance Artist Beauty
- Andrea Mustain as Scrabble Beauty
- Priya Dewan as Burka Beauty
- Katherine E. Scharhon as Plaid Beauty
- Lee Kiang as Other Beauty
- Carla Bosnjak as Other Beauty
- Kristin Narcowech as Opera Patron

== Awards ==
Matheny's film won the Academy Award for Best Live Action Short Film at the 83rd Academy Awards. Upon receiving the award, the 34-year-old New York University, Tisch School of the Arts student thanked his mother and told the audience, "Oh, I should have got a haircut!". Matheny also thanked the Filipino-Americans who helped him in the production of the movie.
