= Tallulah Gorge State Park =

State park in Georgia, United States

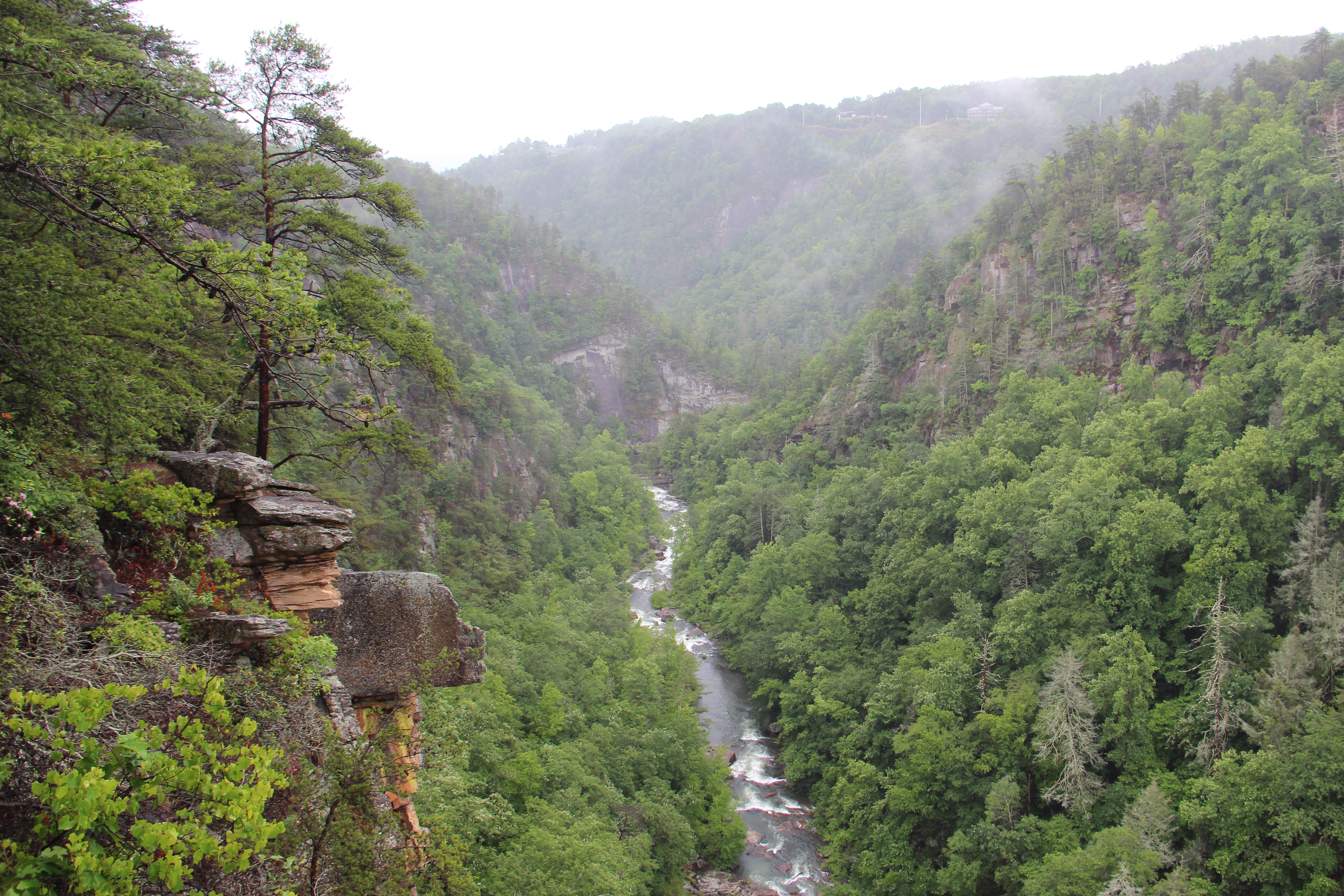
- Tallulah Gorge

- Location within Georgia Location within the United States
- Location: Rabun County, Georgia, Habersham County, Georgia USA
- Nearest city: Tallulah Falls, Georgia
- Coordinates: 34°43′30″N 83°22′13″W
- Area: 2,689 acres (10.88 km^{2}; 4.20 sq mi)
- Governing body: Georgia State Park

Tallulah Gorge State Park is a 2,689-acre (1,088 ha) Georgia state park adjacent to Tallulah Falls, Georgia, along the county line between Rabun and Habersham Counties. The park surrounds Tallulah Gorge, a 1,000-foot (300 m) deep gorge formed by the action of the Tallulah River, which runs along the floor of the gorge. The major attractions of the gorge are the six waterfalls known as the Tallulah Falls, which cause the river to drop 500 feet over one mile (150 m over 1.6 km).

== History ==
Although Tallulah Gorge State Park was not established until 1993 under Georgia governor Zell Miller as a result of cooperation with Georgia Power, there were discussions as early as 1905 regarding the establishment of a park at Tallulah Gorge. Tourism intensified in 1882 with the completion of a railroad later called the Tallulah Falls Railroad which brought thousands of people a week to the area. Additionally, when Georgia Power began building a series of hydroelectric dams along the original course of the Tallulah River, efforts to establish a park intensified. Helen Dortch Longstreet, widow of Confederate General James Longstreet, led an unsuccessful campaign in 1911 to have Tallulah Gorge protected by the state.

== Area ==
Tallulah Gorge is bounded upstream by a hydroelectric dam operated by Georgia Power. Normally, the river flows much lower than the historical flow. Large releases of water are typically scheduled for kayaking and whitewater rafting on the first two weekends of April and the first three weekends of November. Additional aesthetic water releases are scheduled for weekends in the spring and fall to allow visitors to see what the natural flow of the river would look like in the gorge.

== Facilities ==
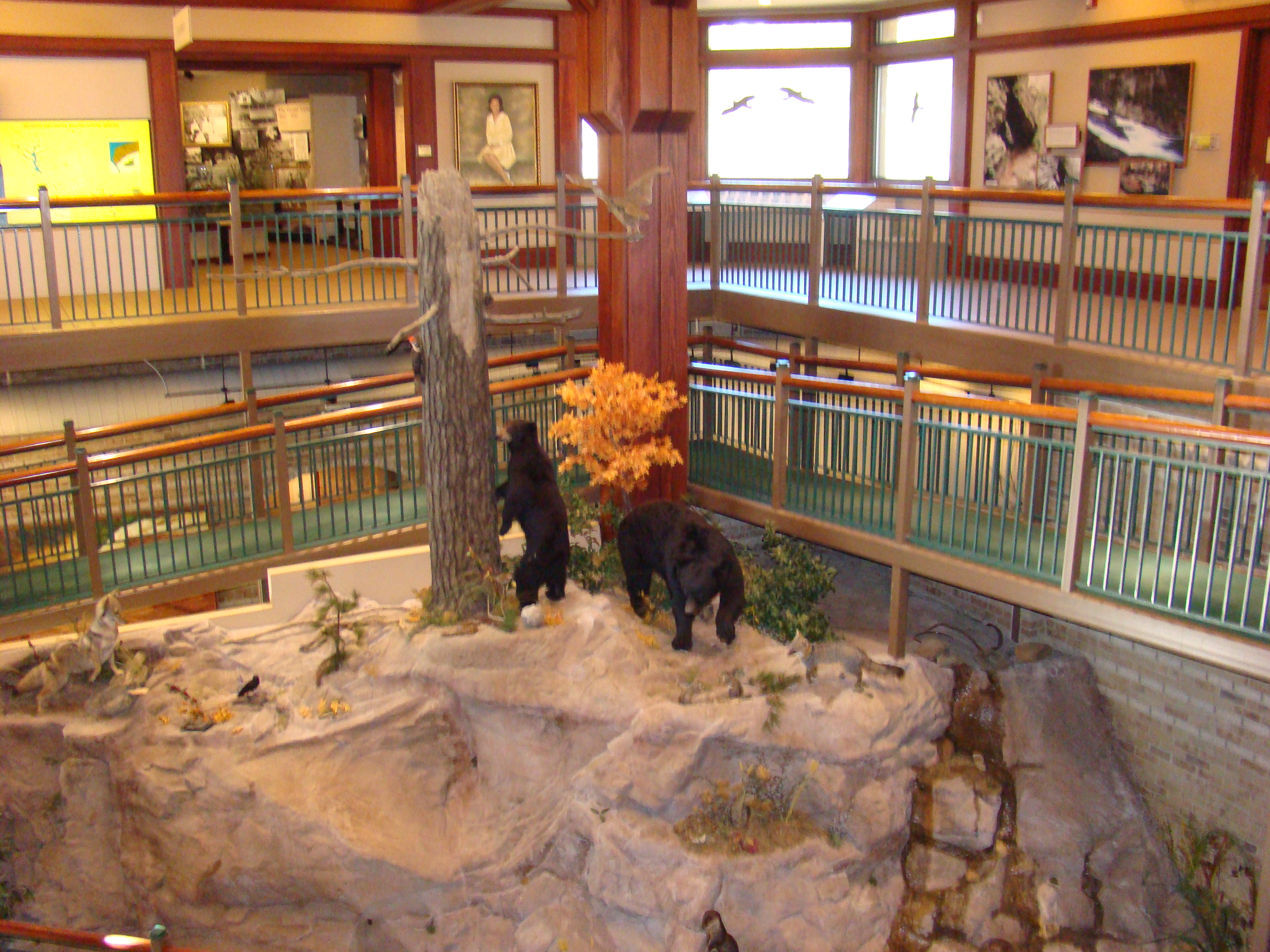
Jane Hurt Yarn Interpretive Center, Tallulah Gorge State Park

- 50 tent, trailer, RV campsites
- Backcountry Adirondack shelter
- Interpretive center and film
- Gorge overlooks
- Suspension bridge
- 63-acre (25 ha) lake with beach (seasonal)
- 2 picnic shelters
- Tennis courts
- Pioneer campground
- Gift shop

== Activities ==
- Whitewater paddling – first 2 April weekends and first 3 November weekends
- Aesthetic water releases (spring and fall)
- Hiking and mountain biking – more than 20 miles (32 km) of trails
- Bicycling – 1.7-mile (2.7 km) paved "Rails to Trails" path
- Swimming
- Rock Climbing
- Fishing
- Picnicking
- Interpretive programs
- playing
