= Luke Matheny =

American actor, writer, and director (born 1976)

- Born: December 23, 1976 (age 49); Mechanicsburg, Pennsylvania
- Occupations: Film director, actor and screenwriter
- Years active: 2008-current

Luke Matheny (born December 23, 1976) is an American actor, writer, and director. Matheny is an Academy Award winner, receiving the Academy Award for Best Live Action Short Film for God of Love.

== Early years ==
Matheny was born in Mechanicsburg, Pennsylvania and raised in Wilmington, Delaware, the son of DiAnn and Mat Matheny, a pipe welder and furniture designer. He graduated from Wilmington's Concord High School in 1993 and received a Bachelor of Science degree in 1997 from Northwestern University's Medill School of Journalism.

He later worked as a reporter and copy editor for a variety of trade magazines, including the respected television trade magazine, Electronic Media, and web sites in Chicago. His career includes stints as a synopsis writer for Netflix and as a story editor for the MTV series Made.

In 1998 Matheny developed a plan with three friends to shoot a movie about three under-appreciated losers from Chicago who quit their jobs, move to Paris, and become street musicians. Matheny and his friends quit their jobs, moved to Paris, and started shooting the film in May 2001. The film premiered at the 2003 Wilmington Independent Film Festival. Matheny recalled, "It was weird; we hit the ground and started casting people off the street. We were hanging out with Parisian models. It was like this weird Cinderella experience. At the end of it we were all completely broke and living with our parents. ... There're probably 33 funny minutes in it, but we really had no idea what we were doing at all. And at some point I decided that I really wanted to keep doing this."

== Career ==
=== NYU, Earano, and God of Love ===
Matheny moved to New York in 2004 and enrolled at NYU Tisch School of the Arts as a graduate student in the film program. His first student film at NYU was Earano, a comic twist on Cyrano de Bergerac, with the title character having unusually large ears instead of a large nose. Earano won the King Award for Screenwriting at the NYU First Run Festival and Best Student Short at the Dam Short Film Festival in Boulder City, Nevada. In its review of Earano, New York Magazine wrote: "One of our favorites of recent years comes in the form of Earano, a charming and hilarious short film directed by and starring Luke Matheny, in which our lead hero has not a giant proboscis but two giant ears, and longs for a beautiful librarian (Emily Young), who has eyes for a hunky Ukrainian janitor."

For his thesis project at NYU, Matheny wrote, directed and starred in the Academy Award-winning film, God of Love. The film is a comedy about a lounge-singing darts champion Raymond Goodfellow (portrayed by Matheny) "who finds his prayers are answered – literally – when he receives a mysterious package of passion-inducing darts." The catch is that the woman he loves, a drummer in his band, is in love with Ray's best friend, the guitarist in the band. Matheny funded God of Love with a combination of student loans, his savings and some production grants, and shot the film in 10 days. Matheny described the bohemian feel he sought to establish for the film as follows:

"I'm a huge jazz fan, and I've always loved jazz photography from the 1950s and '60s. I knew that the film would open in a kind of bohemian-ish jazz setting, so I thought that this kind of black-and-white visual treatment would give the movie an overall cool, romantic, nostalgic quality. And, of course, my cinematographer Bobby Webster was a key player in helping me bring that idea to life. We looked at lots of films that featured jazz scenes: 'I Want to Live!' and 'Paris Blues' were two visual touchstones, in particular. The French New Wave was an aesthetic influence, as well, in some of the film's montage scenes."

=== Academy Award ===
On February 27, 2011, Matheny won the Academy Award for Best Live Action Short Film for "God of Love." The film had previously been rejected by Sundance and Slamdance. In a pre-Oscars interview, Matheny noted, "The Oscar nomination means a lot to me. I've been kind of a psycho Oscar fan my whole life and even, at one point, memorized every Best Picture winner -- which is still a pretty good party trick -- so to actually get a nomination is an amazing event in my life."

Matheny's acceptance speech was considered one of the highlights of the Academy Awards telecast. Descriptions of Matheny's appearance at the award ceremony ranged from the merely descriptive ("mop-haired," "bushy-haired,") to the critical ("somewhat shaggy-looking," "Brillo-headed," and "a vast black bouffant that makes him look like an untidy microphone.") and even laudatory ("follicularly fecund," the "God of Hair"). TV Guide rated him as the "Worst Groomed" nominee. At the start of his acceptance speech, Matheny joked, "I should've gotten a haircut." He went on to thank his mother, who provided craft services on the film, the "great state of Delaware," and "the love of my life," the Russian-born composer, Sasha Gordon, who scored the film. The Los Angeles Times reported it was "safe to say he was out of his comfort zone during the star-studded event," and noted that Matheny admitted he was "standing behind Robert Downey Jr., trying to get on TV." The Salt Lake Tribune called him "a contender for the best acceptance speech." The Calgary Herald reported, "We didn't know who Luke Matheny was before he won an Oscar for Best Live Action Short for God of Love, but we fell in love with him the moment the mop-haired director opened his mouth ... The young filmmaker's enthusiasm was infectious, and even the Hollywood elite applauded when Matheny thanked his mother ..."

=== Career since ===
Matheny's first feature film writing credit, A Birder's Guide to Everything, a coming-of-age comedy that was co-written with Rob Meyer, was released by Focus World and Screen Media on March 21, 2014.

Matheny's feature film directorial debut, Lovesick (2014), a romantic comedy starring Matt LeBlanc, was released in theaters and on demand in 2015.

Between 2013 and 2015, Matheny also directed ten episodes of the comedy television series Maron.

In 2025, he wrote the script for the miniseries adaptation of E. B. White's Charlotte's Web.

== Filmography ==
=== Film ===
- God of Love (2010) – Writer, Director, Actor (short)
- Lovesick (2014) – Director
- A Birder's Guide to Everything (2014) – Co-writer

=== Television ===
- Maron (2013–2015) – Directed 10 episodes
- Gortimer Gibbon's Life on Normal Street (2014) – Directed 11 episodes, wrote 4 episodes
- The Kicks (2016) – Directed 2 episodes
- Me and My Grandma (2017) – Directed all 6 episodes
- The Dangerous Book for Boys (2018) – Directed 2 episodes
- Ghostwriter (2019) – Directed 1 episode
- Black Jesus (2019) – Directed 2 episodes
- The Baby-Sitters Club (2020) – Directed 2 episodes
- Charlotte's Web (2025) – Screenwriter
