= Blink (2022 film) =

2022 American film by Spenser Cohen

- Title card
- Directed by: Spenser Cohen
- Written by: Spenser Cohen; Anna Halberg
- Produced by: Scott Glassgold; Anna Halberg
- Starring: Alicia Coppola; Sophie Thatcher
- Cinematography: Elie Smolkin
- Edited by: Jake York
- Music by: Nicholas Holiday; Ryan Johnson
- Production companies: Screen Gems; Ground Control
- Distributed by: Sony Pictures Releasing
- Release dates: March 13, 2022 (SXSW); March 14, 2022 (YouTube)
- Running time: 10 minutes
- Country: United States
- Language: English

Blink is a 2022 American supernatural horror short film directed by Spenser Cohen, who co-wrote the screenplay with Anna Halberg. It follows a paralyzed woman (Sophie Thatcher) who can only blink her eyes and attempts to use this ability to communicate to her nurse (Alicia Coppola) that the supernatural entity that injured her has arrived at the hospital.

Blink premiered at SXSW on March 13, 2022 and was released on YouTube on March 14.

== Plot ==
Mary arrives at a hospital after suffering a traumatic brain injury. Conscious but unable to move, her only form of communication is to blink her eyes to yes or no questions. Using this method, she manages to tell her nurse that a supernatural entity tried to kill her by throwing her from a window. After the nurse leaves to get help, the entity enters the room. The entity pushes her hospital bed to a nearby window. The nurse intervenes just in time to save Mary, but the entity then kills them both.

== Cast ==
- Alicia Coppola as The Nurse
- Scot Nery as The Creature
- Sophie Thatcher as Mary
- Marsh Halberg as Doctor
- Jen Liu as Doctor

== Production ==
Blink is the first film to be produced at the Scream Gems Horror Lab created by Sony Pictures' Screen Gems. The film was shot before the COVID-19 pandemic in two days. It was directed by Spenser Cohen, who co-wrote the screenplay with Anna Halberg, his classmate at the USC School of Cinematic Arts. Blink was originally going to be a feature film, but Cohen and Halberg changed the script to a short "proof of concept" after producer Scott Glassgold invited them to participate in the Scream Gems program. Glassgold also recommended Sophie Thatcher for the leading role after working with her on Prospect (2018). Cohen said the film was inspired by an experience he had, during which he suffered from sleep paralysis and heard a noise: "It goes back to that fear that we all have when we wake up at three in the morning in our bed, and we think we've heard a noise, or we see something in the darkness." To get ideas for the film, he watched Alfred Hitchcock's Rear Window and the works of James Wan. Cohen said the practical effects were difficult to achieve due to the film's low budget and tight filming schedule.

== Release ==
The film premiered at SXSW on March 13, 2022, before a release on YouTube on March 14.

== Reception ==
Tori Danielle of PopHorror called the film one of the best horror shorts of the year and praised its storyline and special effects.
