= The Tomorrow Man =

2019 film

- Theatrical release poster
- Directed by: Noble Jones
- Written by: Noble Jones
- Produced by: Nicolaas Bertelsen; Tony Lipp; James Schamus; Luke Rivett
- Starring: John Lithgow; Blythe Danner; Derek Cecil; Katie Aselton; Sophie Thatcher; Eve Harlow
- Cinematography: Noble Jones
- Edited by: Zimo Huang
- Music by: Paul Leonard-Morgan
- Production companies: Symbolic Exchange; Anonymous Content
- Distributed by: Bleecker Street (United States and Canada); Sony Pictures Releasing International; Stage 6 Films (International)
- Release dates: January 30, 2019 (Sundance); May 22, 2019 (United States)
- Running time: 94 minutes
- Country: United States
- Language: English
- Box office: $354,103

The Tomorrow Man is a 2019 American drama film written and directed by Noble Jones, in his directorial debut. It stars John Lithgow, Blythe Danner, Derek Cecil, Katie Aselton, Sophie Thatcher, and Eve Harlow. It had its world premiere at the Sundance Film Festival on January 30, 2019, and was released in the United States on May 22, 2019, by Bleecker Street.

== Plot ==
While preparing for the apocalypse, Ed meets and falls in love with Ronnie, who he meets at the grocery store. Both of them hoard items, Ed as a prepper and Ronnie as a coping mechanism for a personal tragedy.

== Cast ==
- John Lithgow as Ed Hemsler
- Blythe Danner as Ronnie Meisner
- Derek Cecil as Brian
- Katie Aselton as Janet
- Sophie Thatcher as Jeanine
- Eve Harlow as Tina
- Wendy Makkena as Beverly St. Michaels

== Production ==
The film shot around Rochester, New York, Lithgow's hometown, for about six weeks in August and September 2017.

== Release ==
The film had its world premiere at the Sundance Film Festival on January 30, 2019. Prior to this, Bleecker Street acquired distribution rights to the film and set it for a May 22, 2019 release. Sony Pictures Worldwide Acquisitions acquired international distribution rights to the film.

== Reception ==
On the review aggregator website Rotten Tomatoes, 43% of 56 critics' reviews are positive. The website's consensus reads: "John Lithgow and Blythe Danner are almost enough to save The Tomorrow Man, but their efforts are overwhelmed by a problematic story." Metacritic, which uses a weighted average, assigned the film a score of 49 out of 100, based on 18 critics, indicating "mixed or average" reviews.
