= Spenser Cohen =

American film screenwriter, executive producer, and music video director

- Occupations: Film screenwriter; Executive producer; Director
- Years active: 2012–present
- Notable work: Extinction; Moonfall; Tarot

Spenser Cohen is an American screenwriter, film producer, and director best known for his work on Extinction (2018), Moonfall (2022), and Tarot (2024).

== Career ==
In March 2012, Cohen directed Diana DeGarmo's music video "Good Goodbye". In December 2013, his screenplay for the science fiction action film Extinction appeared on Black List, before being picked up by Netflix and released in 2018. In February 2019, Amblin Partners announced it had bought Cohen's script for the science fiction film Long Distance. In May 2019, Cohen was writing the script for Moonfall.

In June 2021, Cohen wrote the screenplay for the Netflix film Ivy. The film was retitled to House/Wife before it was dropped by Netflix. In August 2021, Cohen gained notability from writing the screenplay and story for Expend4bles. In March 2022, he wrote and directed the horror short film Blink. In May 2024, he made his feature-length directorial debut with the horror film Tarot (originally Horrorscope), which he also wrote.

== Filmography ==
Year	Title	Director	Writer	Executive producer	Notes	Ref.
2012	Good Goodbye	Yes	No	No	Music video	
2018	Extinction	No	Yes	No		
2022	Moonfall	No	Yes	Yes		
2022	Blink	Yes	Yes	No	Short film	
2023	Expend4bles	No	Story	Yes		
2024	Tarot	Yes	Yes	Yes		
2024	Long Distance	No	Yes	No		
TBA	House/Wife	No	Yes	Yes		

== Accolades ==
For his work on Expend4bles, he was nominated at the 44th Golden Raspberry Awards for Worst Screenplay.
