= Kat Slater =

- EastEnders character
- Jessie Wallace as Kat Slater (2025)
- Portrayed by: Jessie Wallace (2000–present); Kate Peck (2001; flashback); Sumar-Elise Sandford (2018; flashback); Amelia Crouch (2025; flashback)
- Duration: 2000–2005; 2010–2016; 2018–present
- First appearance: Episode 2003; 18 September 2000
- Created by: Tony Jordan
- Introduced by: John Yorke (2000, 2018); Bryan Kirkwood (2010)
- Spin-off appearances: Slaters in Detention (2003); EastEnders: E20 (2011); Kat & Alfie: Redwater (2017); EastEnders: The Podcast (2018)
- Crossover appearances: East Street (2010)
In-universe information
- Other names: Kat Moon; Kat Mitchell
- Occupation: Market trader; Barmaid; Pub landlady; Cleaner; Businesswoman; Bar owner; Laundrette owner; Taxi controller
- Family: Slater
- Father: Charlie Slater
- Mother: Viv Slater
- Sisters: Lynne Hobbs; Belinda Peacock; Little Mo Mitchell
- Husband: Alfie Moon (2003–2013, 2014–2020, 2025–present); Phil Mitchell (2023–2025)
- Sons: Dermott Dolan; Tommy Moon; Bert Moon; Ernie Moon
- Daughters: Zoe Slater
- Stepsons: Ben Mitchell; Raymond Dawkins; Albie Watts
- Stepdaughters: Cherry Slater; Louise Mitchell
- Grandsons: Josh Goodwin
- Granddaughters: Jasmine Fisher
- Grandmothers: Mo Harris
- Uncles: Harry Slater
- Nephews: Freddie Slater
- Other relatives: Sean Slater; Stacey Slater; Lily Slater; Arthur Fowler Jnr; Hope Fowler; Charli Slater; Cherry Slater

Kat Slater (also Moon and Mitchell) is a fictional character from the BBC soap opera EastEnders, played by Jessie Wallace. She was also played by Kate Peck in a flashback in 2001, Sumar-Elise Sandford in a flashback in 2018 and Amelia Crouch in video footage in 2025. Kat is the second eldest Slater family sister and first appeared on 18 September 2000. Kat's usual dress is very short skirts and leopard-print tops, with much make-up and heavy fake tan. Her initial stint saw her involved in many storylines, most significantly in a plot twist that sees her supposed sister Zoe Slater (Michelle Ryan), revealed to be her daughter after she was raped by her uncle Harry Slater (Michael Elphick) as a child. Kat and Zoe's relationship is tested several times, and a feud forms when they compete against each other for the affection of Anthony Trueman (Nicholas Bailey). Another key aspect to the character's storylines is her marriage to Alfie Moon (Shane Richie), prior to which she became briefly engaged to Andy Hunter (Michael Higgs); after Kat jilted Andy on their wedding day, he blackmailed her into sleeping with him in his revenge bid against Alfie and Kat. Kat was absent between November 2004 and May 2005 following Wallace's maternity leave. Kat later left the soap on 25 December 2005.

Wallace reprised the role in 2010 and Kat returned on 17 September, before taking leave from the soap again between January and June 2012. Kat departed the soap again in May 2015, returning briefly between December 2015 and January 2016. Wallace reprised her role as Kat in the six-part spin-off series Kat & Alfie: Redwater in 2017. Following the confirmation that Redwater would not return for a second series, it was announced that Kat would instead return to EastEnders; she returned on 22 March 2018. On 26 January 2020, Wallace was suspended from the soap for two months due to her off-screen behaviour, and departed on 23 March. She ultimately returned to work when production of the series resumed during the COVID-19 pandemic, returning on-screen on 7 September 2020.

In the events of Kat's second stint on the soap, in what was called "the biggest soap story in probably the history of soaps", Kat and Ronnie Branning (Samantha Womack) both give birth on the same day, but Ronnie's son, James Branning, dies, and while Kat is in hospital and her son, Tommy Moon (Shane and Ralfie White), is unattended, Ronnie swaps James and Tommy. The storyline received over 6,000 complaints, making it the second most complained about EastEnders storyline. Kat's storylines also include suffering a miscarriage, an affair with Derek Branning (Jamie Foreman) which ends her first marriage with Alfie, becoming penniless and permanently scarred in a fire and becoming a millionaire. In 2015, Kat's most prominent storyline – her rape, is revisited when it is revealed that Kat had given birth to twins and she has a secret son, Zoe's twin brother; this facilitates the character's second exit from the soap. In Kat & Alfie: Redwater, Kat discovers her son is a murderous Catholic priest, Dermott Dolan (Oisín Stack).

Since her reintroduction to the show in 2018, Kat's storylines have focused on the breakdown of her and Alfie's marriage, and her separation from Tommy and their twin sons Bert and Ernie Moon; a relationship with Kush Kazemi (Davood Ghadami); feuds with both her cousin Stacey Slater (Lacey Turner) and enemy Phil Mitchell (Steve McFadden); embarking on a relationship with Phil after sleeping with him; surviving an accidental hit-and-run by her friend Whitney Dean (Shona McGarty); taking temporary custody of Tommy's half-sister Scarlett Butcher (Tabitha Byron); a feud with Scarlett's mother, Janine Butcher (Charlie Brooks); clashing with Phil's sister Sam Mitchell (Kim Medcalf) and his ex-wife Sharon Watts (Letitia Dean) over the Mitchell empire; her tumultuous marriage to Phil, ending in their separation; suffering parental abuse from her son Tommy; reconciling with Alfie; becoming landlady of the Queen Vic; reuniting with Zoe, whom she supports through a stalking ordeal, discovering that she is a grandmother upon meeting Zoe's long-lost children, Jasmine Fisher (Indeyarna Donaldson-Holness) and Josh Goodwin (Joshua Vaughan); and ultimately dealing with the aftermath of Zoe's death. Wallace has won multiple awards for her portrayal of Kat, who has become one of the show's best-loved characters.

== Creation ==
=== Casting ===
In 2000, EastEnders' executive producer, John Yorke, decided to introduce the "classic" Slater family. He felt the show needed to go back to its roots and bring back some traditional values. BBC's head of drama, Mal Young commented, "We do not have enough solid families in the soap, there were a lot of fractured families and people who were alone." The family consisted of grandmother Mo Harris (Laila Morse); father Charlie Slater (Derek Martin); and his four children, Lynne Slater (Elaine Lordan), Kat (Wallace), Little Mo Morgan (Kacey Ainsworth) and Zoe Slater (Michelle Ryan), and Lynne's boyfriend, Garry Hobbs (Ricky Groves). However, in 2001, it is revealed that Kat was the mother of Zoe, after being raped by her uncle Harry Slater (Michael Elphick).

Actress Jessie Wallace was cast in the role of Kat after the character was developed at an improvisation session for thirty actors and actresses earlier in the year. Speaking of her casting, Wallace commented: "I'm pleased to be playing the champion floosie in the square. I want to achieve Cindy Beale proportions! Basically, Kat goes clubbing, steals other people's men and gets into fights. I love her. Everyone's warned me to expect a lot of stick in the street – Kat's such a full-on character. But I'm prepared for the fact that my life's going to change completely. I can't wait, but at the same time I'm scared." Wallace made her first on-screen appearance as Kat on 18 September 2000.

=== Characterisation ===
The character was described as "a bit of a floozy", "fiery", "a bitch" and "feisty". Kat is described by the EastEnders website saying that as soon as she arrived in Walford with her "fake tan, heavy make-up and hoop earrings", viewers would know that Kat would bring a dose of "Viagra to the men of Albert Square". It continues to read: "Her mum had died, dad was grieving and nan (Mo) was touting stolen meat off the back of lorries (some things never change). Kat wasted very little time in establishing herself as a drama queen by shocking everyone with the revelation that her youngest sister, Zoe was in fact her daughter. Then she stole her dishy doctor boyfriend for good measure." It continues: "With her enemies closing in, there was nothing to do but return home to Walford for help, complete with a huge baby bump".

Unwanted pregnancies, suicide attempts, miscarriages – Kat has been through it all. But it was her relationship with Alfie that changed everything. Obvious to everyone that Alfie and Kat were meant for each other from the moment they met, he tamed her for a while but she couldn't be happy for long."

— The BBC describes Kat (2010)

== Development ==
=== Initial stint ===
Kat Slater was introduced in September 2000 as part of the newly arrived Slater family, created by series consultant Tony Jordan. The character quickly became central to the show's narrative, notably during a major 2001 storyline where Kat revealed to her supposed younger sister, Zoe Slater (Michelle Ryan), that she was actually her biological mother following childhood sexual abuse by her uncle Harry Slater (Michael Elphick).

On 24 April 2004, it was announced that Wallace was pregnant with her first child and that she would take maternity leave from EastEnders later in the year. Wallace was intended to depart in December; however, a pregnancy scare meant that she was forced to stop filming in August, and scripts featuring Kat subsequently had to be re-written. She returned to filming in February 2005 and made her on-screen return in May. Upon her return, Wallace signed a six-month contract in a reported bid to boost the show's ratings.

=== Departure (2005) ===
In July 2005, the BBC announced that Wallace had decided to leave EastEnders in a mutual decision with producers. A spokesperson for the show praised Wallace's talent and thanked her for her contribution to the series, stating that "Jessie and the writers want Kat Moon to go out on a high."

Kat's exit storyline centred upon her on-off relationship with husband Alfie Moon. Shane Richie, who plays him, had also announced his decision to quit in April 2005, enabling writers to create a joint exit for the pair. Both characters departed the serial together in an episode broadcast on Christmas Day 2005.

In 2009, Wallace stated that she missed playing Kat but had no immediate plans to return to EastEnders, despite persistent rumors to the contrary. She noted that the public still associated her with her role, and that she was flattered people still remembered her. Despite her comments, Wallace later reprised the role on a permanent basis alongside Richie in September 2010.

=== Reintroduction (2010) ===
In February 2010, it was announced that Richie and Wallace would be reprising their roles as Alfie and Kat respectively, with Wallace commenting that she was "excited to slip back into Kat Slater's stilettos." Controller of BBC drama production John Yorke predicted that their return would make "fantastic viewing", given the wealth of new characters introduced since their departure. Wallace signed an initial one-year contract, and returned to filming in July. Wallace and Richie were the first cast members signed by new executive producer Bryan Kirkwood. The decision was made following the resignation of Barbara Windsor, who played Peggy Mitchell, which left what Kirkwood described as a "hole" in the programme. Kirkwood decided that the time was right for Kat and Alfie to return, saying that they "very much herald the new era of EastEnders."

The plot saw Alfie and Kat regaining control of The Queen Victoria public house after it burned down, and Kat returning to Walford pregnant, with some public suspicions about the paternity of her child. To promote the characters' return, the BBC released a trailer across the BBC network in September 2010. The western-themed trailer saw Kat outside of The Queen Victoria, with various characters looking on and Kat saying "Where d'ya get a drink around 'ere?" with Alfie replying "I think you're gonna' need one." The advertisement uses the tag line "It's all kicking off in the square". The return, in September 2010, drew 9.22 million viewers and 37.7% of the total TV viewing audience. Kat returned on 17 September 2010.

Wallace admitted she was nervous about reprising the role of Kat. Speaking to TVTimes, Wallace said she had feared forgetting how to play Kat. She commented: "I missed playing Kat," she said. "Now it feels like I've come home. I was nervous at first because I thought I might have forgotten how to play her, but as soon as I stepped back onto the Square she came back to me. Even when I was out of the show, people called me Kat every day in the street. I was flattered and now I'm having a great time. The recent scripts have been brilliant."

Talking to What's on TV, Wallace commented on Kat's reunion with Alfie. She said: "She punches him! Alfie has come looking for her and hasn't seen her for months. He keeps saying to her 'You're fat' and she says 'I'm not fat. I'm pregnant!' Then she says, 'Don't worry Alfie, it ain't yours'. She's peed off with him. He's been in prison and she's had to survive on her own pregnant. But she loves him unconditionally. No matter what they do, they will always end up together. She wants stability... a future for the baby and her. She sets him this challenge and he buys it."

=== Baby swap ===
"The storyline presented Ronnie with grief, disbelief and anger and the temporary breakdown of her relationship as well as her gradual coming to terms with her loss and the efforts to re-build her life following the tragedy. This underlined the fact to viewers that whilst the loss of baby James was a catalyst, Ronnie's reaction was born out of extreme personal trauma in her life and not as the direct and sole consequence of losing her baby. It is Ofcom's view that the broadcaster did not intend the storyline to suggest that her actions were a typical response of a mother who had experienced SIDS and therefore sufficient editorial context was provided to viewers."

— Ofcom's broadcast bulletin clearing the storyline

Richie revealed in an interview with This Morning that Kat and Alfie would be involved in an ongoing storyline, which he said is "going to be the biggest soap story in probably the history of soaps." At the end of 2010, Kat and Ronnie both give birth on the same day, but Ronnie's baby, James, dies and while Kat is in hospital and her baby, Tommy, is unattended, Ronnie swaps the infants. The storyline received over 6,000 complaints, making it the second most complained about EastEnders storyline. It was then decided to end the storyline earlier than originally planned. It was reported by the Daily Star Sunday that Ronnie experiences a change of heart after visiting relatives in hospital and seeing the midwife who delivered her son. An EastEnders spokesperson said, "We do not comment on future storylines but we have always said Ronnie will do the right thing and Tommy will be reunited with Kat." Wallace revealed that she doesn't regret her involvement of the baby-swap storyline, saying that she was "just doing her job". Wallace told Bang Showbiz:"I stand by it. We're actors at the end of the day, we do our job and then we go home. It's drama, that's it." She also praised Womack's acting and vowed to move on to "bigger and better things" after she departed. She added: "[Samantha is] a fantastic actress who played a brilliant role in a fantastic storyline so I wish her all the best."

Derek Martin said he was surprised by the new baby swap storyline when it was published in the media. Speaking on This Morning, Martin commented: "I'm one of those actors – I don't know how many others do it – but when I get the scripts, I only read my bits. So I looked [and saw], 'Charlie leaves his grandson upstairs, goes downstairs, gets on the drink, gets drunk – the baby's dead'. So that's terrible guilt obviously – because I feel as though it's my fault that he's died. I was surprised when I saw the story come out – because I don't read the others' [lines] – that it was a baby swap." Discussing the surrounding controversy of the plot, Martin added: "Don't forget, there's millions of people – there's 60 odd million here, and they've all got different opinions. Every subject, everything that comes up... everybody will have opinions about that. So therefore you have to accept that's the public – some are for, some are against, and that's the way it is." He continues: Over the years, don't forget, EastEnders have always had subjects. When [Charlie's] brother had raped Kat and we didn't find out until later on, that was a very strong storyline. And when Little Mo was bashed by her husband Trevor. These stories are all part of real life."

Nina Wadia has praised Womack and Wallace for their "acting skills" during the storyline. Marc Elliott added: "The storyline got whipped up into a massive frenzy. It's not representative in any way, shape or form of mothers who have lost their babies." EastEnders actress Patsy Palmer has also praised the plot for its "great acting". In an interview with Take It Easy, asked whether the show's bosses handled the storyline well, Palmer replied: "I think they did. I know there's been loads of bad press, but something like that is always going to be sad to watch and it will upset people. But at the end of the day, it's a drama and it's not real. I think it got blown out of all proportion. Unfortunately, things like that do happen in real life. Babies get swapped and snatched in hospitals. I'm sure that any parent who has lost a child will find even talking about their experience very difficult, let alone watching it being acted out on television. Even my daughter got upset but she is only 9 so maybe I shouldn't have let her watch it. I just didn't realise it was going to be so heart-wrenching, which was down to the great acting."

Samantha Womack admitted that she thought the plot was "implausible". She commented: "I thought it was implausible. Most women who lose a child would not go out and abduct one," she told the Daily Mirror. "But Ronnie is a soap character and she is not necessarily representing real life. Soap is based on controversy and sensationalism because bosses are trying to get high ratings and they can't write things like 'Ronnie had a cup of tea'. Otherwise people wouldn't watch it." On 1 August 2011, Ofcom cleared the storyline. The baby swap storyline prompted a huge 1,044 complaints reported to Ofcom. Ofcom also added that many of the complaints were made because the storyline was presented "in an offensive manner" because it "appeared to suggest that a mother who has suddenly and tragically lost a baby through cot death would react by stealing another baby to replace that loss". Kym Marsh supported Ofcom's decision to clear the storyline. Marsh wrote in her magazine section: "Last week, EastEnders was cleared of wrongdoing by Ofcom, the media regulator, over its baby swap storyline, and I think that's the right decision. It's just a storyline, like any other. I understand why people got upset about it, but no-one meant to upset anybody. Soaps are supposed to portray real life to a certain extent, but it's meant to be high drama for entertainment purposes. I mean, how many murders can you have in one square? There's a nod to real life but, for the most part, soaps help take people out of the real world."

Wallace previously stated that filming the baby swap storylines "did not stretch her acting abilities". She told Buzz: "None of it's been really tough for me, to tell you the truth. I go in, do my scenes and then I go home. As an actress you want to get roles you can get your teeth into. I leave it at the gates when I leave work. Years ago, with the storyline when Kat told Zoe Slater she was her real mother, I found it tougher because I was new to the game. But I've been doing it a lot longer now, and can detach myself from it. You have to." On a lighter note, Wallace added: "There are two babies playing Tommy, called Ralph and Shane, and they're dressed in outfits like zebra-skin babygros and little denim jackets – that's the Alfie (Shane Richie) influence. They keep going for Kat's big earrings and they're always grabbing at the chicken fillets I have to wear."

It's so lovely having the chance to work with a baby all the time. It's made me really broody. But it's definitely not going to be easy for Kat and Alfie. They've grieved for the death of their child. They thought they'd buried him, and now they've suddenly got him back. That's a massive thing to deal with.

— Jessie Wallace explains Kat's emotions after receiving Tommy.

In an interview with Buzz, Richie said that although that Kat and Alfie have received Tommy back, the couple still have problems to face. He commented: "Kat and Alfie are happy to have Tommy back, but they still buried the baby they thought was their son. That destroyed them and their relationship. The cot-death storyline is just the start of what's going to happen to Kat and Alfie. I've also heard rumours about whether Alfie is really firing blanks. He had a fertility test in Spain. Could it be wrong?" Wallace and Richie have hinted that the plot could have a long lasting impact on Kat and Alfie. Shane Richie added: "While Alfie happily throws himself into being a dad to Tommy, it's Kat who's going to be finding things difficult."

Upon the return of Kat's father Charlie, Wallace said that this will provide a "big boost" to her character. Talking to We Love Telly, asked whether it's important for Kat to see Charlie again, Wallace replied: "Yes, definitely. With what happened the night they thought Tommy died, things were still unresolved for them. Although they cleared the air before he left, things weren't right between them, so to have him back with her now makes it all the more special. It's also Charlie that makes Kat realise that she needs to bond with Tommy. He makes her see that she can do this." Discussing what type of mother Kat will be, Wallace added: "I think she wants to be the best mum possible. She knows that this is her second chance to make a go of it and she is determined to do a good job."

=== Miscarriage ===
Shortly after Kat is reunited with her baby, it was announced that Kat would fall pregnant by Alfie, despite Alfie believing he is infertile. Shortly after finding out she is pregnant, Kat falls ill and is rushed to hospital and discovers that she has suffered a miscarriage. The Daily Star reports: "The pregnancy takes Kat and Alfie completely by surprise and neither of them know how they really feel about it," a source said. "Kat is understandably very nervous and anxious about having another baby. Her head is all over the place. But before she has a chance to get used to the idea she suffers a miscarriage. It is a cruel thing to happen to them after everything that they've already been through this year. And once again viewers will be in tears as they watch Kat come to terms with losing her baby." An EastEnders spokesperson added: "There is a little bit more heartache for Kat and Alfie as they try to rebuild their lives with Tommy."

An additional EastEnders insider also commented: "The fact that Kat gets pregnant at all is amazing. Alfie has believed that he was infertile after trying to have kids with his wife for ages with no luck. So when Kat finds out that she's expecting, it's devastating not least because it raises some big questions in Alfie's mind." The insider added to Inside Soap: "Who can blame Alfie for asking some questions here? He stood by Kat while she had his cousin's baby and through the misery of losing baby Tommy. It would be absolutely devastating for him to learn that all this tragedy has driven them apart again." STV added that after forgiving Kat for cheating on him with Michael, Alfie would find it hard to get over another betrayal.

Shane Richie revealed that viewers dislike seeing Kat and Alfie happy. Speaking to Inside Soap Richie commented: "People don't like it when Kat and Alfie are really happy. I never used to believe that, but I do this time around. The way that Jessie and I like to think of it is that there's the curtain in the Queen Vic that separates the bar from their home – until you go behind it, you'd never have any idea there were problems. The bar is Kat and Alfie's public stage." With the possibility that Alfie could be the father of Tommy, Richie added: "As soon as I found out, I thought, 'If Alfie isn't infertile, then surely Tommy could be his son'. Jessie and I spoke about the dates of when Alfie was in prison, and when he saw Kat before she had the fling with Michael. The writers reckon they don't match up, but we think they do. Jessie is quite adamant about it!"

=== Mark Garland ===
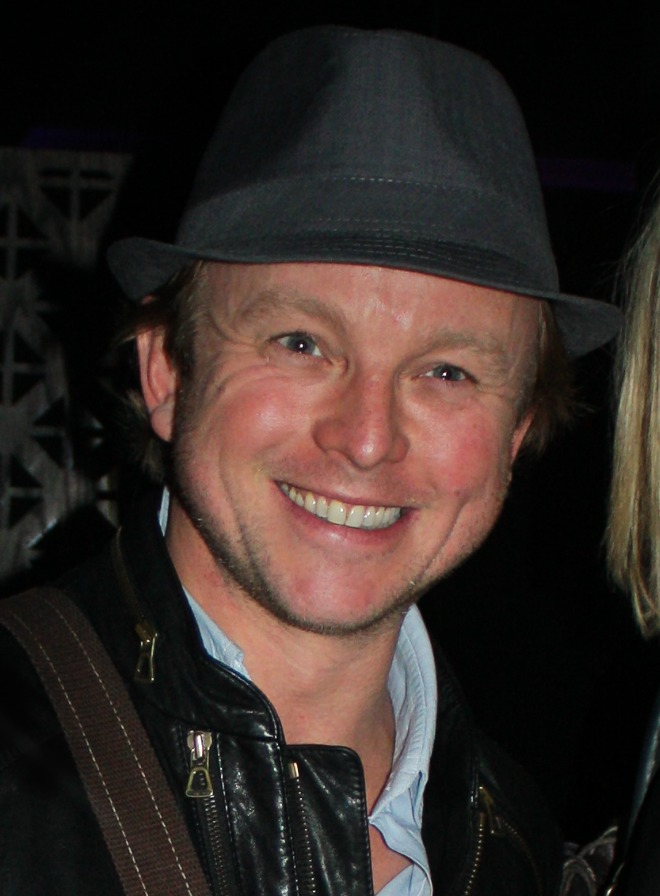
Chris Simmons (pictured) was cast as Mark Garland, a love interest for Kat.

In 2011, Kat has a one-night stand with Mark Garland (Chris Simmons) as Alfie is showing no interest in her. An insider said: "The trouble is that while Alfie is busy playing that game, a delivery driver who calls at the Queen Vic makes a big play for Kat – and soon she's facing serious temptation." The insider added: "Kat is vulnerable, insecure and at odds with Alfie. It's exactly the sort of state that could see her do something very stupid indeed. Alfie has done serious damage to their marriage but Kat could destroy it completely." Another source added: "In accusing her of cheating on him, Alfie has undone years of good work in building up Kat's self-esteem. No matter what he says now, she feels as though he still sees her as a woman of loose morals. He cooks up a hare-brained plan to keep Kat by treating her mean – and starts ignoring her, basically."

In an interview with All About Soap Richie revealed how Alfie reacts. He commented: "It's the last thing he expected to hear. He didn't see it coming. He's upset and angry, especially when Kat tries to explain how he made her feel when he accused her of sleeping with someone else when she got pregnant again. He obviously didn't mean the things he said then – he just said them in the heat of the moment, but those words have stuck with Kat." Asked whether Alfie appreciates Kat's honesty, he replied: "Not at all – he'd rather not know. Deep down, Alfie knows that Kat has done things in the past that maybe she shouldn't have, but he didn't know all the details. Now he knows Kat has been unfaithful, he has got to confront the fact. The jury is still out on that one," he explained. "I don't know, if I'm honest. They always seem to take two steps forward and then one step back... They do tend to come through these things, so who knows?"

=== Temporary break (2012) ===
Kat was written out of EastEnders temporarily in January 2012. The writers for EastEnders organised "emergency script changes" which saw Kat called away to care for her father Charlie after a stroke. It was announced shortly after Wallace's break from EastEnders that Sharon Watts, played by Letitia Dean, would return to the series. Numerous tabloids reported that the purpose of Dean's return was to replace Jessie Wallace; this was later denied by an EastEnders spokesperson. The spokesperson commented: "There is no link between Letitia's return to EastEnders and Jessie not being around at the moment. We have been working on plans to bring Sharon back for quite some time." An insider added: "Jessie and Letitia are two fantastic actresses and their characters are firm favourites with fans. Viewers can look forward to seeing them back on screen together later this year."

Kat returned to the show on 7 June 2012. Wallace praised EastEnders writers for bringing back Kat's funny and feisty attitude. Wallace added that it's like going home to her family and that she has missed Shane Richie. Wallace further explained: "Before [my] break, I had the baby swap story and towards the end of last year, Kat was becoming very downtrodden. Now she's coming back fighting fit. It's almost like when Kat first arrived on screen in 2000. She's come back with those original feisty, tarty, funny and a bit cold sides to her. It's a new Kat."

=== Affair ("Who's Been Sleeping with Kat?") ===
In June 2012, it was announced that Kat would embark on a long-running affair with another Albert Square resident after becoming bored with the lack of attention at home. The identity of her lover was kept secret from both the cast and the crew; all scenes of Kat with her lover were filmed with an extra. Speaking of the storyline, Executive Producer Lorraine Newman said: "The consequences are not only great for Kat and Alfie, but also for each individual suspect. The audience will join the cast and crew guessing across the summer and autumn as we eliminate the suspects one at a time, leading to one almighty explosion." After the storyline was announced, five suspects were revealed as potential candidates: Ray Dixon (Chucky Venn), Michael Moon (Steve John Shepherd), Max Branning (Jake Wood), Derek Branning (Jamie Foreman) and Jack Branning (Scott Maslen). In a poll on the website Digital Spy, Jack Branning was shown to be the favourite with 43.5% of the votes. Ray was eliminated when he walked in on Kat while she was on the phone to her lover. Michael was eliminated when Kat confessed to him that she was having an affair. With only the three Branning brothers left as suspects, it was revealed on 20 December that Kat's mystery lover was Derek.

=== Departure (2016) and Kat & Alfie: Redwater ===
On 4 April 2015, the BBC announced that Wallace would appear in a six-part BBC One drama series alongside Richie and would also be departing EastEnders. In the series, Kat and Alfie visit Ireland in the "search for answers to some very big questions". Speaking about the show, Wallace commented: "I have always loved working on EastEnders so when I heard of this new drama to take Kat and Alfie outside of Walford, I couldn't believe our luck. To be exploring the next chapter for Kat as well as working alongside my best mate, Shane, is a dream come true and a huge compliment." The series, Kat & Alfie: Redwater began airing in May 2017.

Kat and Alfie: Redwater follows Kat and her husband Alfie as they arrive in the fictional Irish village of Redwater to "search for answers to some very big questions" and put their past behind them. Treadwell-Collins confirmed that "the discovery that Kat has a secret son will [...] ultimately lead to the Moons realising that the answers to so many questions lie across the sea in Ireland." Director Jesper W. Nielsen said the series is "About how one woman's search for a lost child opens Pandora's box; revealing the terrible lies and secrets in the little village of Redwater". Writer Matthew Graham said, "Kathleen Moon is an unwitting bomb in Redwater and creating the debris from her explosive arrival is what drew me to this project." He also said: "Everything [Kathleen] does comes out of the fact she doesn't think much of herself. So, her humour and her in-your-face qualities all come out of a place of insecurity. She doesn't think she's good enough. That's what I use when I'm writing Kat."

Wallace was given a makeover for her part in Redwater, different to how Kat looks in EastEnders. In the series, the character is called "Kathleen" by all characters except Alfie, who calls her "Kat".

=== Reintroduction (2018) ===
On 20 December 2017, it was announced Wallace would reprise her role as Kat in Spring 2018. Her return was masterminded by interim executive consultant John Yorke, who created the Slaters in 2000, and Kat will return alongside her grandmother Mo Harris (Laila Morse), and Jean Slater (Gillian Wright). Yorke commented: "The Slaters are one of the all-time great families in EastEnders and Albert Square has never felt quite the same since they scattered to different ends of the country, and in some cases beyond. It has been a real joy to find a way to bring them back together and we're incredibly excited about where we are taking them next. It won't just be familiar Slaters either as there are a couple of twists and characters to add fresh spice to an iconic creation." Wallace added: "I am thrilled to be returning to EastEnders next year and knowing what John Yorke has in store for the Slaters is incredibly exciting. I love Kat and Walford dearly and I cannot wait to get started – watch out Walford, Kat's coming home."

Wallace praised Yorke for returning to family orientated drama and for revitalising the Slaters, a family he introduced, stating that there is "hustle and bustle" within the family. Wallace explained that upon her return, Kat has "got debris to clear up, all the damage" caused by the news of her death imparted by Mo, but her "fun side" has returned, but wants Kat to remain single. With regard to other interactions, Kat could "clash" with Karen Taylor (Lorraine Stanley), matriarch of the newly established Taylor family.

== Storylines ==
=== 2000–2005 ===
Kat arrives in Walford on 18 September 2000, followed by her family: father Charlie Slater (Derek Martin), sisters Lynne Slater (Elaine Lordan), Little Mo Morgan (Kacey Ainsworth) and Zoe Slater (Michelle Ryan), as well as grandmother Mo Harris (Laila Morse) and later, cousin Stacey Slater (Lacey Turner). A fourth sister, Belinda Peacock (Leanne Lakey) is also introduced later the following year. Kat embarks on a brief fling with Steve Owen (Martin Kemp), much to the annoyance of his girlfriend Mel Healy (Tamzin Outhwaite). She finds work in The Queen Victoria public house as a barmaid, where she is an instant hit with the customers. Fiercely defensive of her sisters, Kat embarks on a feud with Little Mo's abusive husband Trevor Morgan (Alex Ferns), though has a fling with Lynne's boyfriend Garry Hobbs (Ricky Groves). Much to Zoe's frustration, Kat is often over-protective of her. When Zoe announces her decision to move to Spain for a new life with their uncle Harry (Michael Elphick), Kat refuses to allow her to go. It is then revealed that Kat is in fact, Zoe's mother, having been sexually abused by Harry aged thirteen. Charlie and his late wife Viv (Debi Gibson) had made the decision to raise Zoe as their own, meaning Kat had to become her "sister". Upon hearing of Harry's interference with his daughter, Charlie punches him in The Queen Vic and banishes him from Walford. The entire family were aware of Zoe's true parentage, with the exception of Belinda and Little Mo. Unable to accept these revelations, Zoe flees Walford, and Kat attempts suicide by cutting her wrists. She recovers, is romanced by local doctor Anthony Trueman (Nicholas Bailey), and later finds Zoe and brings her home. Their relationship improves, but after Kat breaks up with Anthony, he and Zoe begin an affair. Zoe disowns Kat for disapproving of their relationship, and later runs away when Anthony confesses that he is still in love with Kat.

Anthony and Kat's relationship resumes, but she fails to impress his colleagues and breaks up with him as he is about to propose. Kat discovers she is pregnant by him and decides to have an abortion. Her boss Alfie Moon (Shane Richie) persuades her not to, but she suffers a miscarriage shortly after telling Anthony of the pregnancy. Alfie comforts her and realises that he is in love with her. Kat soon begins a relationship with local crime kingpin Andy Hunter (Michael Higgs), and they end up getting engaged. However, Kat confesses to Alfie's grandmother Nana (Hilda Braid) that she loves Alfie – who upon discovering this intervenes; he stops Kat and Andy's wedding and confesses his love for her. Kat leaves Andy, and she and Alfie marry on Christmas Day. Alfie later borrows money from Andy which he is unable to repay, so Andy threatens to kill him unless Kat has sex with him. A reluctant Kat does so, but unbeknownst to her Andy films the liaison and sends it to Alfie. Alfie becomes cold and distant and Kat resorts to alcoholism. After a one-night stand with a stranger, Roger (Russell Boulter), a disgusted Kat leaves Walford.

Several months later, Kat's grandmother Mo discovers that she is in prison for prostitution. Upon her release, Mo convinces her to return to Walford. Kat is determined to win Alfie back, but he is now in a relationship with Little Mo. Though he opts to reconcile with Kat, she is unwilling once she learns of his relationship with her sister. Kat rebuilds her relationship with Zoe, and they part on good terms when Zoe leaves to work as a holiday rep in Ibiza. Before Zoe leaves, Kat discovers that Zoe was involved in the murder of Den Watts (Leslie Grantham), and tells Kat that she had been led to believe that she had killed Den until Sam Mitchell (Kim Medcalf) had told her the truth about Chrissie Watts (Tracy-Ann Oberman) being the murderer. Kat confronts Sam about letting Zoe believe that she had killed Den and threatens Chrissie to not let Zoe's involvement become known to the police. Chrissie agrees, but in return, asks for an alibi. Stacey agrees to become Chrissie's alibi for the sake of Zoe, but Chrissie is later caught out and arrested for Den's murder. When Nana Moon dies, Kat comforts Alfie and their feelings for one another once more become apparent. On Christmas Day 2005, they confess their love and depart Walford to travel across the United States.

=== 2010–2016 ===
Kat returns to Walford in September 2010, fleeing from a man she and Alfie conned for money, whilst in Spain. Alfie arrives but Kat is displeased to see him. She reveals to her family that while Alfie was serving time in prison, she had an affair with another man, who proves to be Alfie's cousin Michael Moon (Steve John Shepherd) and is now pregnant with Michael's child. In an attempt to prove himself responsible, Alfie leases The Queen Victoria public house. He struggles to raise the rent, and enters into a partnership with Michael, unaware that Michael is the father of Kat's baby. After an argument with Alfie, Kat agrees to move back to Spain with Michael, but ultimately changes her mind and reconciles with her husband. When Kat's cousin Stacey goes on the run in December 2010, Kat covers for her by lying to the police about her whereabouts. Kat receives a text from Stacey, explaining that her and her daughter Lily (Aine Garvey) are safe in Mexico.

Kat gives birth to Tommy, and is rushed to hospital the next day due to complications. While she and Alfie are absent, James, the newborn son of local resident Ronnie Branning (Samantha Womack), dies of sudden infant death syndrome. Ronnie swaps the babies in an act of desperation. A devastated Kat believes her father is to blame for Tommy's death, as he left him alone to go for a drink. After the funeral, Ronnie attempts to return Tommy, but Kat misunderstands and believes that she is rejecting James. Charlie opts to leave Walford, although Kat forgives him before he departs. She is shocked when Michael returns to see his son, and upset when he shows no emotion at learning that he died. Kat's friend Martina Quinn (Tamara Wall) and her daughter Shenice (Lily Harvey) visit from Spain. After they leave, Kat and Alfie miss Shenice, and consider IVF to try for another baby. Their consultant feels it is too soon, and their relationship breaks down again, but eventually they reconcile. Four months after taking Tommy, Ronnie returns him and hands herself in to the police. Kat reacts with disbelief, but a DNA test reveals the truth, and Kat is reunited with Tommy. Kat is initially furious with Ronnie, but forgives her when she is sentenced to three years in prison.

Kat and Alfie holiday in Spain, and bring Shenice back with them. Upon their return, Kat gets pregnant again. Alfie believes that he cannot have children and assumes Kat has cheated on him, despite her insistence to the contrary. Alfie learns that he is wrong, but Kat is hurt by his accusation and will not let him near her, even after suffering a miscarriage. Kat has a one-night stand with Mark Garland (Chris Simmons), which she instantly regrets. She eventually confesses to Alfie, and tells him that her behaviour is how she is and always will be. Alfie tells Kat he would rather have her cheat on him than not have her in his life. The couple attempt to mend relations with each other over Christmas, but Alfie overhears Kat saying that she thinks he no longer loves her. Alfie books a session with a marriage counsellor, which Kat initially refuses to attend. She turns up late, and Alfie tells her the counsellor never arrived. Alfie pays his friend Gerry (Paul Reynolds) to pretend to be a marriage counsellor, who comes to their home. Kat tells Gerry that she believes Alfie does not love her any more and so she wants to end their marriage.

After Charlie suffers a stroke, Kat stays with him for a number of months, until Roxy Mitchell (Rita Simons) calls Alfie, who is with Kat, asking him to return, as Kat's relative Jean Slater (Gillian Wright) has gone through many troubles involving Michael. Kat returns with Alfie and comforts Jean, who has broken down. She confronts Michael about it, but he continues with his lies, saying that Jean has been stealing things. However, Kat is not fooled and says she will rip him apart when she finds out the truth. She continues to harass Michael and his fiancée, Janine Butcher (Charlie Brooks), until the police get involved and caution Kat and Jean. Alfie informs Kat that he has taken a loan from Eddie Moon (David Essex) but Kat later learns that Eddie is in financial difficulties and so could not have lent them money. Kat is introduced to Derek Branning (Jamie Foreman) who reveals that Roxy and Alfie grew very close while she was away. Kat confronts Roxy, who admits she had a crush on Alfie, and confesses to giving Alfie the loan. Kat sacks her from her job as a result.

Alfie tries to start a football team for the pub, and Kat takes it over. She flirts in order to get people to sign up, and continues flirting at a party, with Derek, Michael, Ray Dixon (Chucky Venn), Jack Branning (Scott Maslen) and Max Branning (Jake Wood), sharing a close moment with each of them. While in the kitchen alone, an unseen man enters and he and Kat have a sexual encounter. She feels guilty the next day and attempts to neglect calls and texts from the mystery man, who has bought her a new phone. Kat eventually responds and talks with the man to tell him to leave her alone, but changes her mind and they begin a frequent affair, and he supplies them with a flat to use. Kat endeavours several times to end it, but she continuously succumbs. He falls in love with her, with Kat reciprocating, and when he sends Kat flowers, Alfie becomes suspicious. Kat lies that they are from Charlie, but Alfie does not believe her, and asks her to be totally honest, to which Kat reveals her three-month affair, telling him he does not know the other man. Alfie is furious and throws her out. After a heart-to-heart with Michael, Kat returns to The Queen Vic to ask for Alfie's forgiveness and suggests going away for a while.

Alfie forces her to end her romance, which Kat does, and they go away together to try and salvage their marriage. When they return, they are shocked to be sacked by Phil Mitchell (Steve McFadden). However, Kat convinces Phil to give them their jobs and home back, by telling him she is trying to repair their relationship after the affair. When her mystery lover gives her another key to their flat, she writes "Kat loves Alfie" in lipstick on a mirror. As time goes on, Alfie becomes steadily more paranoid of Kat's activity, believing she is still having the affair. Alfie follows her to the bedsit, where there are petals on the bed and candles are lit. She refuses to answer his questions, but Alfie finds a letter addressed to Mr Branning. Alfie goes back to The Queen Vic, where he confronts all three Branning brothers. One of their phones rings, and Alfie answers Kat's call. The phone is Max's, but Kat reveals that it is Derek she was having the affair with. Alfie kicks Kat out of their home and Kat stays with Derek, who promises to show Alfie a message on her phone where she tries to break up with him, but he instead plays a message in which she begs to see him. Kat discovers this, and an argument between them, along with Derek's other family arguments, leads to him dying from a heart attack.

Alfie starts a relationship with Roxy, who moves in with Alfie, upsetting Kat. Kat teams up with Bianca Jackson (Patsy Palmer) to earn money cleaning, first at the R&R and then at The Queen Vic after being given a job by Roxy. Kat and Bianca are fired from both jobs, so they decide to set up a market stall together, with Alfie offering money to help them start. Kat is upset when Alfie changes the licensee name from Kat to Roxy on the plaque above The Queen Vic doors. Alfie helps Kat when she is questioned over stolen goods, but to prove his love to Roxy, he decides he wants to divorce Kat. Kat fights with Roxy, and has sex with Michael, which she regrets the next day. Lauren Branning (Jacqueline Jossa) tells Kat to take control of her life, so Kat tells Roxy and Alfie she had sex with Michael and that he is a better lover than Alfie. Kat has an ongoing feud with Roxy, and is upset when she finds out Roxy and Alfie are trying for a baby. When a man named Josef (Aleksandar Mikic) tries to steal money from the pub's safe, Kat helps Roxy by convincing him not to. Roxy thanks Kat, but then accuses her of trying to win Alfie back, which Kat denies. Kat and Alfie receive their decree nisi. Kat says it is not too late to cancel, but Alfie insists he has moved on, and proposes to Roxy.

When Kat learns that Roxy is not going to meet Ronnie at her release from prison, she goes instead. Ronnie is unwilling to talk to Kat at first, but soon the pair discover that various tragedies in their past mean that they have plenty in common. Kat offers Ronnie a bed for the night, and then gradually persuades Alfie to accept Ronnie's presence back in Walford. This and Michael's death bring Kat and Alfie closer together. The night before his wedding, Alfie visits Kat and it leads to them kissing passionately, but she stops it. Distraught that she cannot be with Alfie, Kat decides to leave Walford, but Bianca takes her to the wedding and Kat walks in to see Alfie say "I do" to Roxy. She leaves the church and heads for the airport, but after she has boarded the plane, Alfie embarks and declares his love for her. He is forced off by security and Kat follows, reuniting with a kiss.

Phil decides to sell The Queen Vic as revenge for Alfie's treatment of Roxy, and Kat and Alfie move back in with Mo. Kat then reveals that she is pregnant by Alfie, and discovers that she is having twins. Having spotted Stacey from the top deck of a bus, Kat decides to track her down. She visits Janine in prison, and agrees to provide a false witness statement for Michael's murder, in return for Janine dropping false charges against Stacey, so that she can return to Walford. At her trial, Janine confesses to her crimes, and Kat is charged with perjury. She is devastated when Stacey hands herself over to the police for Archie Mitchell's (Larry Lamb) murder (see Who Killed Archie?), four years previously. Kat attends a hearing, and is given a suspended sentence. After the market is merged with Spring Lane, Kat immediately clashes with her new rival, Donna Yates (Lisa Hammond), and is later surprised when Alfie reveals he has bought a pitch on the market. Kat gives birth to Bert and Ernie Moon. Stacey is released after she appeals her sentence and comes to live with Kat and Alfie. The financial situation becomes worse for the Moons when Alfie reveals they are to be evicted, as they have not been paying their bills.

Kat briefly works on the market again, but market inspector Aleks Shirovs (Kristian Kiehling) forces her off her stall when he discovers she is working and claiming maternity benefit. Alfie lies to her that he has managed to convince the council to give them more time to rally together the money they need, but secretly plans to claim house insurance by setting fire to their house. He does so, but is unaware Kat is inside at the time. She becomes trapped although Alfie rescues her. She is badly burnt and suffers permanent scarring to her face. On leaving hospital, she and Alfie remarry, with two nurses as the only witnesses, before returning to the square and moving into a flat Alfie had organised for them to squat in. When the owners arrive, they are thrown out, and Kat is angry with Alfie, although out of desperation they squat in a new flat with help from Donna. Lee Carter (Danny-Boy Hatchard) calls the landlord of the flat when trying to fix the boiler, so they are evicted again, and they stay at The Queen Vic with Alfie's friend Mick Carter (Danny Dyer). After Kat makes an emotional speech to the social housing manager, they are offered a council house in Hull. Stacey tries to stop her, but before they leave, Kat discovers a photo of Nana that was not lost in the house. Alfie confesses that it was he who started the fire. Kat, appalled by the disclosure, insists their marriage is over and stays with Stacey and Lily. Mo tells Kat that Harry left her some money in his will. Alfie finds out, and tries to convince her to use the money to make a fresh start after the divorce. She takes the cheque from Mo and later rips it up in front of Alfie, insisting it does not change the past, nor their impending divorce.

Kat begins to have second thoughts about the divorce after Pam Coker (Lin Blakley) gives a speech about love and family. Stacey reveals to Alfie that their rent is increasing and Kat is struggling with money. Alfie then invites Kat to his flat for lunch and they reminisce about their relationship. The next day, Kat lashes out at Alfie for leaving leftovers for the children, but at the urging of Stacey, she agrees to be his date to Ian and Jane's wedding if he makes more effort for making up for the fire. On the wedding day, she gets heavily drunk, and during the reception, shoves Sonia Jackson's (Natalie Cassidy) head into the wedding cake. When the nursery raise their rates, Kat is forced to leave the children in Mo's care to work her shift at the market, but ends up having drinks with Kim Fox-Hubbard (Tameka Empson). When Mo brings the children over to the pub, they misbehave, and Kat is thrown out of the pub. Undeterred, Kat and Kim continue drinking and sneak into the pub to steal another bottle of wine. Linda Carter (Kellie Bright), catches them, and while Kim leaves to find the cash to pay for it, Linda prepares to call social services to tell them of Kat's irresponsibility as a mother, but Kat snatches Linda's phone and throws it across the ground. When Kim returns with Shirley Carter (Linda Henry), she confesses her fears about being a bad mother, resulting in the other three women sharing their experiences of motherhood and reassuring her. Kat also tells Linda to speak to Mick about her fears that the baby may not be his. Linda then realises that the phone call was still connected, and promises to fix things to make sure social services do not know about what happened; however, Kat receives a call from a social worker requesting to visit her. Kat is surprised when a lawyer visits her about Harry telling her about a compensation case with four other women also raped by Harry.

After the visit from the social worker, Kat tells Stacey and Mo that she will start saving up to visit Zoe in Spain. Two days later, Kat receives a text from Zoe saying she does not want to see her. Kat is devastated and she writes a letter to the solicitors about receiving all the remaining money from Harry's will, and intends to post it the next morning. The next day, following a conversation with Shabnam Masood (Rakhee Thakrar), Kat changes her mind and throws the letter away, but Mo retrieves it and posts it on her behalf. After Kat is robbed, Stacey discovers that Kat has been overdosing on Tommy's medicine. Kat admits to drinking the medicine to numb out her thoughts about Harry, but promises to stop. When Stacey tells Mo that the money would not be good for Kat, Mo has a change of heart and has Harry's money transferred to her own account. Kat later finds out about this, and then, after burning the money, falls into a depression and tries to kill herself. Alfie finds her and calls an ambulance; at the hospital, he admits that he is still in love with her. He takes her home and decides to stay temporarily in order to help her with the children and her upcoming visit from another social worker. During the visit, Kat remains withdrawn from answering questions about how she is feeling and why she attempted suicide and insists she is fine, but Alfie says on her behalf that she is not fine but that they are working on it, and admits to the social worker his feelings of guilt from starting the fire.

After she almost kisses Alfie, Kat nearly has sex with Max, but regrets it and goes to Alfie for comfort. The next day, she tells Alfie that she wants to get back together with him, but he tells her that he is not ready as he does not want to hurt her again. This causes Kat to reevaluate her life, so she visits the convent where she gave birth to Zoe to seek some answers, though it is now a nun's care home. A nun, Sister Ruth (June Whitfield), remembers her going into labour and they talk about the past and the future. Kat then leaves and goes to the police station to make a statement about Harry. Ruth checks their records and discovers that Kat also gave birth to a son. Later, a content Kat returns to Walford and tells Stacey and Alfie that she has finally made her peace with the past and is no longer willing to let Harry control her.

Kat tells Alfie that she wants to reunite with him, and although he initially resists, he later changes his mind. They buy a lottery scratchcard and win £1,000,000. They then plan to move to Spain so Kat can be closer to Zoe. Alfie discovers he has a brain tumour and decides not to tell Kat, so as not to worry her. Kat and Alfie then leave with Tommy, Bert and Ernie to live in Spain.

Kat returns to Walford to spend Christmas with Stacey. Alfie follows with the children, and it is revealed that Zoe does not want to see her. Kat is surprised when Sister Ruth visits her, and reveals the truth about her son, whom the nuns called Luke, and Ruth reveals he was adopted by an Irish family. Kat realises Mo knew about Luke, and argues with Mo and Charlie. Charlie has a heart attack and dies, leaving Kat devastated. Belinda returns (now played by Carli Norris) and blames Kat for Charlie's death. Alfie tells her that he has a brain tumour, but assures her it is benign. Kat vows to attend Charlie's funeral, despite her sisters not wanting her there, but on the day, Stacey is mentally ill, so Kat stays with her at The Queen Vic. She makes amends with Belinda, and tells her about Luke. Belinda then reveals that Viv once took the family (minus Kat) to a village in Ireland called Redwater, and Viv visited a church and left crying, blaming Kat for this, and Belinda saw a couple with a boy watching them leave. Kat then finds out information about Redwater, but she and Alfie then leave for Spain.

=== Kat & Alfie: Redwater and EastEnders: The Podcast ===
In episode 1 of Kat & Alfie: Redwater, Kat (referred to as "Kathleen" in the series), Alfie and Tommy arrive in the Irish town of Redwater, where Kathleen is almost immediately convinced that Andrew Kelly (Peter Campion) is her son, while Andrew's grandmother, Agnes Byrne (Fionnula Flanagan) is suspicious of her. Alfie warns Kathleen to wait for the right time and make friends first, but Kathleen confides in Agnes's husband Lance (Ian McElhinney) that her son was taken away from her in 1983 and she believes he is in Redwater. Lance tells Agnes this, and Agnes immediately says Kathleen should not be told the truth as it would unravel everything they have built. Kathleen visits the Byrnes' farm and talks to Andrew about his life, but then Lance warns him to give the Moons a wide berth. Kathleen then admits to Alfie that she is scared of seeing how disappointed her son would be in her. Lance tells the local priest, Dermott Dolan (Oisín Stack), that Kathleen is his real mother. It is revealed that Iris Dolan (Orla Hannon) lost a baby in London and brought Dermott back as her own, and her husband Peter (Stanley Townsend) does not know the truth. The next day, Dermott murders Lance by drowning him.

In episode 2, Kathleen and Alfie are invited to Lance's wake by Peter, and when speaking to Agnes and Lance's daughter, Eileen Harrington (Angeline Ball), Kathleen realises that Andrew cannot be her son. Agnes confronts Kathleen and Alfie, so Kathleen realises that Lance told her why they are there. Agnes says Kathleen gave up her right to see her son when she gave him up, but Kathleen explains she did not know she had a son as she had passed out during the birth. Dermott and Tommy hear this, and Tommy asks if he has a big brother. Later, Kathleen and Alfie decide to return to Spain, but Tommy wants to find his brother. Tommy sneaks out of the house, and Kathleen and Alfie try to find him. Andrew's mother, Roisín Kelly (Maria Doyle Kennedy), tells Kathleen that she saw Tommy at the church, so they go there, followed by Agnes. They find Dermott praying with Tommy, who tells Kathleen that he found his brother. Kathleen realises that Dermott is her son, and Dermott confirms this.

In episode 3, Kathleen and Dermott have bonded, but she lies to him about who his real father is. Dermott worries that Tommy will tell Peter the truth and threatens him. Alfie realises that Kathleen lied to Dermott, which results in an argument. Dermott overhears them arguing about him not knowing the truth and Kathleen refusing to tell him. In episode 4, Agnes urges Kathleen to return to Spain. When Dermott learns of this he confronts Agnes about taking him from his mother. In episode 5, Agnes tells Dermott to keep Kathleen away from the christening of Bernie Kelly's (Susan Ateh) baby, but Dermott says Kathleen has made him feel welcome and invited him to meet his brothers in Spain, so Agnes reveals that Dermott has a twin sister. Dermott confronts Kathleen over this, who said she was waiting for the right time and insists there is nothing else that Dermott does not know.

In episode 6, Bernie, a local garda, asks Kathleen about the last time she saw Lance and Kathleen wonders if she suspects something happened, but Bernie denies this. Meanwhile, Kathleen is unaware that Alfie is having an operation on his brain tumour. Alfie asks Dermott to find Kathleen and bring her to the hospital, as it means they are unable to go back to Spain. Bernie works out that Dermott was involved in Lance's death, and sees him on the beach with Kathleen. Kathleen tells Dermott that Bernie was asking about him. He sees the garda arriving so takes Kathleen in a boat, saying they will try to find the whale that was recently seen off the coast. Bernie shouts at him to stop and calls the coastguard. Kathleen asks Dermott if he did something to Lance. Dermott then accidentally crashes the boat into a rock and Kathleen is thrown into the water and cut by the propeller. Dermott gets Kathleen out of the sea but there is nobody around to help. Meanwhile, Alfie has his operation but loses his pulse and the medical staff start to resuscitate.

In episode 1 of EastEnders: The Podcast, "Kat's Indecent Proposal", set in Málaga in March 2018 and released in November 2018, Kat and Alfie have been running a bar in Spain, but have split up and Kat is in a relationship with their business partner, Dimitri (Andrew Byron), who proposes to Kat. Kat finds out from Sofia (Gloria Sanders) that Dimitri invested in Kat and Alfie's bar so that he could run it into the ground and eliminate his competition. Kat wants to see the contract Alfie and Dimitri signed, which makes Alfie think she wants a divorce and he decides to close down the bar. Kat realises Dimitri's controlling ways and decides to take Tommy, Bert and Ernie back to England with Alfie, and leaves Alfie a voicemail saying this and telling him that she loves him. However, Alfie deletes the voicemail without listening to it. Kat and Dimitri go to the bar but Alfie is out, so they stay the night. The next morning, Dimitri does not allow Kat to leave the bed to make breakfast for the children. Tommy decides to make breakfast and Kat's relative, Hayley Slater (Katie Jarvis) arrives to witness Tommy dropping the kettle on Ernie, who is scalded. Kat sees this and screams.

=== 2018–2022 ===
Big Mo returns to Walford, telling Stacey that Kat has died. Stacey raises money for Kat's funeral, but Jean arrives and tells Stacey that Kat is not dead as she spoke to her that day; Mo has lied to raise money, as she has financial problems. Kat returns to Walford, and is confused that The Queen Vic is holding a benefit night for her, and confronts Mo, but hides when Ian brings the raised money. After Ian leaves, Kat reveals that she and Alfie are taking a break from their marriage, and he is in Spain with their children, running a bar with a Russian partner after their old bar failed. Kat, Stacey, and Mo arrive at the Queen Vic whilst Mick is giving a toast to Kat's memory, and she attempts to maintain that Mo made a mistake, but ends up fighting with Karen Taylor (Lorraine Stanley), which results in a pub fight. Jean pays off Mo's debt, and Kat starts a cleaning business to repay Jean. Kat is furious when she finds her cousin Hayley (Katie Jarvis) in Walford and she demands that Hayley leaves, however Hayley threatens to reveal what has happened in Spain. It is revealed that Kat had cheated on Alfie, and was not watching when Tommy accidentally burnt Ernie, leading to Alfie kicking her out. Kat is unaware that Alfie and Hayley had had a one-night stand soon after, which resulted in Hayley becoming pregnant. After Hayley tells Alfie about her pregnancy, he tries to persuade Hayley to have an abortion but Hayley decides to keep the baby, and refuses to name the father. Kat gets a video call from Alfie and he asks her to collect something for him. Believing him to still be in Spain, she follows his instructions and goes to a chapel where she is reunited with Alfie. Alfie is now running a funeral business and she is angry that he has not brought their children with him, but they make amends. She is later angry when he later reveals that he lied to her about not bringing their children with him to London, but Alfie soon returns to Walford with their children. Though he reunites with Kat, he is shocked to discover that Hayley did not terminate her pregnancy, and insists that they keep it hidden from Kat. Hayley develops feelings for Alfie and she names their daughter Cherry after his deceased mother. Jean finds out that Alfie is Cherry's father and insists that Alfie tells Kat, but he continuously delays telling her.

Kat visits a café that Charlie used to take her to when she was a child and meets a family friend, Tony. She also meets Charlie's other friend, Maurice, but he is reluctant to meet her. He later tells her that he was with Charlie and her uncle Harry, and Harry said he "knew how to shut her up". Maurice realised that he was talking about sexually abusing Kat, but could not tell Kat if Charlie had heard this or not. Kat is devastated but Maurice admits that Charlie did not hear what Harry said and admits he lied because he did not like Charlie. On Christmas Day, Hayley gifts Alfie a lock of Cherry's hair which is discovered by Kat, and she realises that Alfie is Cherry's father. Kat and Alfie have a confrontation which causes Hayley to push Alfie down a flight of stairs to defend Kat, supposedly killing him. When the police arrive, they discover that Alfie had survived and had left with Cherry. Alfie returns but refuses to return Cherry and suggests that they adopt her and leave Walford together. Kat agrees but changes her mind and gives Alfie the option to take their children on the condition that he returns Cherry to Hayley. Alfie returns Cherry back to Hayley but takes her back, but returns her again and a sympathetic Kat allows him to spend time with their children. Kat reconsiders a relationship with Alfie, but Alfie's scam leads to debt and after borrowing money from Phil Mitchell (Steve McFadden) and not being able to pay it back, Alfie flees Walford and fakes his death, leaving Kat with money which he took from Phil.

Phil taunts Kat for the money that Alfie had stolen from him, but Kat does not know about the money or Alfie's whereabouts and Phil holds her responsible for Alfie's debt. However, Kat later finds the money and uses half of it to fund Jean's cancer treatment. After a brief fling with Kush Kazemi (Davood Ghadami), they begin dating, but their relationship is tested when Kush announces that he wants to file for joint custody over his and Stacey's son, Arthur. Stacey accuses Kat of supporting Kush and a rift forms between them. Kat attempts to rebuild their relationship but a hurt Stacey refuses and kicks Kat out of her home. Kat moves in with Kush and makes several attempts to reconcile with Stacey, which backfires in her face when Stacey hides the money that Alfie had left her. Unfortunately for Kat, Phil revives his interest in the money and he asks Shirley Carter (Linda Henry) to retrieve the money back from the Slaters. They eventually give the money back, but Phil continues to menace the Slaters about keeping the money. Whilst drunk in The Queen Vic, Kat drunkenly mocks Phil about the stolen money and as a result, Phil threatens her children. This leads to a showdown between Kat and Phil in The Arches. Martin tries to intervene but Phil becomes aggressive with him and Stacey, in defence, hits him across the head with a wrench. Phil's son Ben Mitchell (Max Bowden) arrives soon after and orders the Slaters to leave, and Stacey and Martin flee Walford in fear of Stacey being imprisoned. Ben frames Keanu Taylor (Danny Walters) for the attack, and he also flees Walford. Kat reveals the truth about the attack to Kush and he moves into the Slater household to protect her against Phil. After recovering, Phil starts to remember details about the attack and confronts Kat, who reveals that Ben had covered it up. Bianca's stepdaughter Whitney Dean (Shona McGarty) asks Kat to cover her stall as she is being stalked by Leo King (Tom Wells). Leo informs the council that Kat has been working on Whitney's stall without a license, which causes a feud. When Leo is pushed off the balcony of The Prince Albert by Kush, Whitney agrees to help Kush by giving the police a stalking log that she had recorded of Leo. Whitney loses it and Kush is threatened with a criminal record, however, Whitney is imprisoned for murdering Leo. Whitney's lawyer Gray Atkins (Toby-Alexander Smith) convinces Kush that pleading guilty will help with Whitney's case, but she is refused bail and Kush ends up with a criminal record. Whilst having celebratory drinks in The Queen Vic for Whitney's release from prison, Kat is contacted by an unknown person for help, and briefly leaves Walford.

Off-screen, Kat gives Cherry to Hayley and visits Stacey. During the COVID-19 pandemic lockdown, Kat and Kush face financial problems, which are funded by Stacey, from money that she stole from Ruby Allen (Louisa Lytton). When Suki Panesar (Balvinder Sopal) increases their rent payments, Kat organises a heist, alongside Kush, Phil, Ben and Shirley. This pushes Kat closer to Phil and they begin a fling after Kat breaks up with Kush. During an argument between Phil, Ben, and Callum, Kat is accidentally knocked down by Whitney. After recovering from the accident, Kat reveals her relationship with Phil and they buy the launderette together and convert the back of it into a taxi rank and name it Kat's Cabs. Kat becomes suspicious when Tommy goes missing and she later discovers that he has been talking to Michael's daughter Scarlett Butcher (Tabitha Byron). Scarlett reveals that her mother Janine Butcher (Charlie Brooks) abandoned her, and she has been living in foster care and is due to be taken into care. Tommy pleads with Kat to foster Scarlett, but she is reluctant, not wanting the truth about Tommy's paternity to resurface. Kat is later forced to tell Tommy that Michael is his father, and not Alfie, and agrees to foster Scarlett. She is reunited with Janine and they battle for custody of Scarlett, which Kat wins. After a fire in the Mitchell house which Janine helps to save Tommy and Scarlett, Kat allows her to live with them. When Janine tells Tommy about Michael's character, Kat throws her out.

Kat, alongside her family, is forced to move in with Phil after Suki evicts them. Kat becomes jealous over Phil and Sharon growing closer after it is revealed that her and Phil's adoptive son Dennis Rickman Jnr (Bleu Landau) is the father of Alyssa. When Kim reports Phil's involvement in Vincent Hubbard's (Richard Blackwood) murder to the police, he attempts to leave Walford with his son Raymond Dawkins (Michael Jose Pomares Calixte). Kat tries to convince him to face imprisonment rather than go on the run, but he decides to leave with Raymond. Kat and Sharon manage to track Phil down in Clacton-on-Sea, and she persuades him to surrender to the police; Phil is arrested and remanded in custody. He is later released, on the basis that he will become an informant, and they are briefly reunited until Phil ends the relationship, after discovering that he will be imprisoned for life if he refuses to cooperate with the police. He keeps this a secret from Kat, but she discovers the truth, and they reunite and become engaged. During their engagement party, Phil is arrested and Kat is left in charge of his businesses. In Phil's absence, Kat struggles to run his business, alongside Tommy's rebellious behaviour, and her relationship with Tommy becomes strained. She is forced to sign a package for Phil and to stash it and she visits him in prison, where he explains that the package secures his safety inside prison. Kat agrees to hide the package and later discovers that it is a gun. When Tommy accidentally stabs his bully Sid Bello (Buddy Skelton), Phil summons his sister Sam Mitchell (Kim Medcalf) back to Walford to look after his businesses whilst he is in prison, leaving Kat unimpressed as she still holds resentment towards Sam for letting Zoe believe that she had killed Sharon's adoptive father Den Watts (Leslie Grantham) all those years ago. Sam persuades Phil to purchase Ruby's club and she turns it into a wine bar, rebranding it "Peggy's", in honour of their late mother Peggy Mitchell (Barbara Windsor), with Kat and Sharon co-running it together. When Kat learns that Phil and Sharon have been having an emotional affair, she sacks Sharon and replaces her with Sam after Sam is shot defending Kat from robbers, unaware that it had been orchestrated by Sam. Stacey's daughter Lily (now Lillia Turner) meddles in Kat's life by finding Zoe online and inviting her to Kat and Phil's wedding. Lily also notices that Zoe has returned to London and arranges for her to meet Kat at Peggy's bar that evening; however, Zoe ignores Lily's message and does not turn up, leaving Kat disappointed again. Kat tells Lily that when Zoe is ready to make amends, she will be waiting, likewise with her sisters Lynne, Belinda and Little Mo.

Whilst Phil is imprisoned, Sam sends threats to Kat and Sharon under the disguise of Phil's nemesis Jonah Tyler (Mark Mooney), in her attempt to retaliate against the pair for pushing her out of the Mitchell empire. When Tommy is handed a bullet, Kat contemplates her future with Phil, but he pleads with her to stay and promises to sort it. Kat is later devastated when she hears from Sam and Sharon that Phil has been killed in prison, but he returns on the opening of Peggy's wine bar, after taking a deal to become an informant for DI Samantha Keeble (Alison Newman). On Phil and Kat's wedding day, Alfie returns and attempts to sabotage the ceremony by luring Bert and Ernie into his boat and locking Kat in when she finds them. When Alfie cannot find the keys to let Kat out, she jumps into a river but arrives late to the wedding. Kat and Phil are unable to marry but they decide to postpone it to another date, leaving Alfie devastated. Alfie continues to pursue Kat in Phil's absence, but she tells him that she loves Phil. She discovers that Sam had been responsible for the incident at the bar and threatening her and her children, leading to Kat attacking Sam and throwing her out. Kat continues to grow closer to Alfie, and when he arranges a Christmas nativity play, he urges Kat to play Snow White. After the play, Kat kisses Alfie but immediately tells him that it was a on/off. When Phil returns Kat reveals the kiss, and he asks her to choose, in which she chooses Phil. DCI Keeble, in her final act of revenge against Phil, kidnaps Kat and Tommy. When Keeble threatens to shoot Tommy, Kat tries to wrestle her for the gun but the bullet is set off. Keeble is shot and she threatens to have Kat arrested and sent to prison, but Phil threatens to expose her as corrupt if she proceeds to do so. Keeble agrees to drop her threats, but Kat once again contemplates her future with Phil. After a heart-to-heart with Alfie, Kat decides to reconcile with Phil when he promises to protect her and Tommy from another dangerous situation.

=== 2023–present ===
In January 2023, Lily confides in Kat about her underage pregnancy and tells her that Stacey and Martin booked her in for a termination. Kat tells Lily that she does not have to go through with it if she does not want to. Lily tells her that it was her decision but she is having second thoughts. After a heart-to-heart with Kat about Zoe, Lily decides to keep the baby and tell the father Ricky Branning (Frankie Day). Kat provides financial support to Lily, which leads to tension with Stacey, who is struggling with debt. Kat learns that Stacey owes money to a loan shark named Shifty Shiv (Peter Caulfield) and is being threatened for repayment. Kat seeks Phil's help to pay off Shiv and stop his threats.

Kat's nephew Freddie (Bobby Brazier) decides to search for his estranged father, Graham Foster (Alex McSweeney), despite the Slaters' objections. Kat is forced to reveal to Freddie that Graham had raped Little Mo, and she leaves Walford briefly to comfort Little Mo. When she returns, Kat is distressed to learn that Alfie might have prostate cancer and that Phil had kept this from her. She calls off their wedding, and Phil subsequently sleeps with Emma Harding (Patsy Kensit), which he hides from Kat. Kat and Phil reconcile and marry in September 2023. During Sharon's hen night, Kat overhears Sharon telling Linda Carter (Kellie Bright) that Phil is the father of her son, Albie Watts (Arthur Gentleman). Kat decides to tell Phil, but Sharon intervenes, threatening to use Albie to reunite with Phil if Kat reveals the truth, though she eventually confesses. At Kat and Phil's joint birthday party, Sam reveals that Phil had slept with Emma shortly before their wedding. Devastated, Kat ends their marriage and moves out. She then grows close to businessman Nish Panesar (Navin Chowdhry), who offers her a flat at a reduced rent. Despite warnings from Phil, Stacey, and her friend Eve Unwin (Heather Peace) about Nish, Kat goes on a date with him. They begin a relationship, but Kat later discovers Nish's manipulative nature and ends things after a confrontation. Tommy starts to antagonise Kat with rebellious behaviour, and after a heated argument, Tommy punches Kat in the stomach, causing her to push him and he hits a table. Tommy later calls the police on Kat. Social services become involved but Alfie intervenes and Tommy admits that he lied about Kat hitting him out of spite because she had refused to buy him new trainers.

Tommy continues to rebel against Kat and assaults her. She conceals this from the Slaters and Alfie, though they find out. After Tommy has an outburst and pours hot soup on Freddie, Jean reports him to social services. They later discover that Tommy has also been harming Bert and Ernie, and is placed in foster care with Zack Hudson (James Farrar). Kat is furious when she discovers that Jean has reported Tommy, but she eventually forgives her. Alfie supports Kat with Tommy, and they grow closer. After sharing a kiss, Kat and Alfie decide to reunite once again. Tommy moves back into the household, and Kat struggles to bond with him. When Tommy starts messaging someone online, Kat and Alfie become suspicious, but Tommy reveals that he has been using AI as a confidant. After it is revealed that Jean's partner, Harvey Monroe (Ross Boatman), has been cheating on her with Kathy Cotton (Gillian Taylforth), Kat sacks him. She then embarks on a new business venture with Cheeky (Keith Bartlett), unaware that Harvey and Kathy are also partners in the business. When Jean discovers this, she slaps Kat in public. As the new venture is a limousine renting business for weddings, Alfie suggests that he and Kat be the couple in their advertisements; Kat accepts, and they become engaged. At Kat and Alfie's joint stag and hen do, Jean is caught by Harvey and Kat trying to set off the fire alarm. Later, Kat and Jean reconcile. After the party, Kat is shocked to find a pornographic website open on the laptop. She believes that it was Alfie using the website and worries that he no longer sees her as attractive. When Alfie turns Kat down, she is devastated, but Alfie reveals that he has been unable to sleep with her because of the effects of his prostate cancer. They then use an enhancement that allows Alfie to consummate their relationship, and it is later discovered that it was Tommy watching pornography. On Kat and Alfie's wedding day, Kat begins to have doubts, especially when the limousine is stolen. She then declares that she does not want to marry Alfie, but ultimately changes her mind, going through with the ceremony. Although the ceremony is not legally binding, they eventually marry at a registry office. After Stacey gains money from a life insurance policy, she buys the Queen Victoria for Kat, making her landlady once again.

Kat grows suspicious when Alfie lies about travelling to Australia to visit his brother Spencer, and is later hurt when he admits he actually went to Spain to search for Zoe. Family tensions escalate for Kat after an argument with Tommy prompts him to run away and find Zoe, who ultimately persuaded to return to Walford with him, much to Kat's delight. Her joy quickly turns to crisis when Zoe rejects her and is accidentally shot. While waiting for updates on Zoe's condition, Kat learns that Zoe had previously given birth to twins and is now being pursued by a mysterious enemy. Determined to protect her, Kat supports Zoe financially by funding a private investigator to search for her surviving child.

As danger escalates around the family, Kat repeatedly shelters Zoe but struggles to trust her claims of stalking, eventually evicting her when Tommy is accused. She continues trying to protect her children, warning Zoe away from Anthony due to his violent history. Kat wrongly suspects Jean as the stalker before evidence clears her. She is devastated when she is falsely told both of Zoe's children are dead and later publicly accuses Anthony of being the stalker when his deception is exposed. After discovering Zoe unconscious beside Anthony's dead body, Kat panics and attempts to cover up the situation to protect her daughter. The truth unravels when Kat learns that Jasmine Fisher (Indeyarna Donaldson-Holness) is Zoe's daughter and that Chrissie orchestrated events to frame Zoe. Despite Kat's efforts, Zoe calls the police and is arrested for Anthony's murder. Heartbroken, Kat becomes convinced that Chrissie killed Anthony and framed Zoe (when it actuality it was Jasmine who committed the crime). After luring Chrissie to Walford with the help of Alfie's cousin Jake Moon (Joel Beckett), Kat realises the truth and phones the police, resulting in Jasmine's arrest and Zoe being released from prison. Kat and Zoe then work together in helping Jasmine prove to the court that she killed Anthony in self-defence whilst also coping with the arrival of Josh Goodwin (Joshua Vaughan), Jasmine's twin brother. Jasmine is eventually acquitted at trial and her return is celebrated by the Slaters.

Over the following months, Kat embraces her role as a grandmother to Zoe's children. Upon the return of Joel Marshall (Max Murray) to the Square, Kat fears for Tommy's safety due to their previous friendship; consequently, Kat encourages Zoe to take Tommy with her on a trip away from the Square. In their absence, Kat struggles with feelings of inadequacy and lack of self-esteem in her role as a mother, but is supported by Alfie. When Tommy and Zoe return at the end of the summer, Kat agrees to help Zoe buy Charlie's cab; however, when Tommy — who is still struggling with Joel's return — goes missing after drinking alcohol, Kat abandons Zoe to find him. After finding him and bringing him back to the Vic, Kat is horrified to learn that Zoe has stolen the cab, and when the owner follows her to the Vic and punches Zack Hudson (James Farrar), he blackmails the Slaters for £10,000 in exchange for not reporting Zoe to the police. After paying him off, Kat lambasts Zoe for her recklessness. In the early hours of the following morning, Kat discovers that Zoe has died in bed as a result of a brain injury she sustained during the carjacking.

== Reception ==
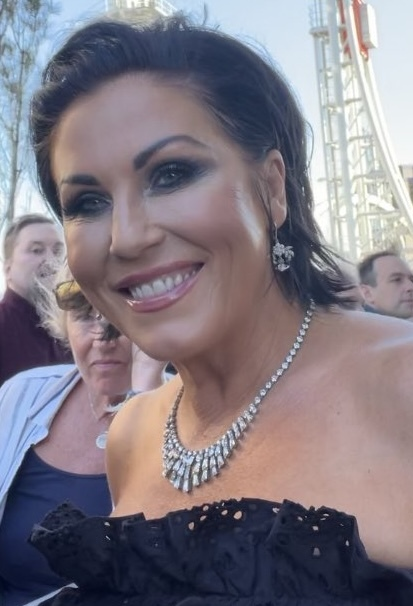
Jessie Wallace has won many awards for her portrayal of Kat.

Wallace has won multiple awards for her portrayal of Kat. At the National Television Awards, she was named "Most Popular Newcomer" in 2001 and "Most Popular Actress" in 2003. She also received "Most Popular Actress" nominations in 2002, 2004 and 2005. At the British Soap Awards, Wallace won "Best Newcomer" in 2001. The following year, EastEnders won "Best Single Episode" for the episode in which Zoe learns Kat is her mother. Wallace was additionally nominated for the "Best Actress", "Best Dramatic Performance" and "Hero of the Year" awards in 2002, and Zoe's maternity was nominated "Best Storyline". She was again nominated "Best Actress" from 2003 to 2006 consecutively, and shared "Best On-Screen Partnership" and "Best Exit" nominations with Richie in 2004 and 2006 respectively. She was further nominated in 2011 for 'Best Actress'. The Inside Soap Awards named Wallace "Best Newcomer" in 2001, Zoe's maternity "Best Storyline" in 2002, and Kat and Alfie "Best Couple" in 2004. A 2009 poll by Inside Soap magazine named Kat as the UK's favourite drama queen in a soap opera. Wallace was named "Best Soap Actress" at the 2003 TV Quick Awards. Following Kat's suicide attempt, Wallace received the 2002 Mental Health Media Award in the "Soaps and Continual Drama" category. The character's 2018 return storyline was nominated for "Most Bizarre Soap Storyline" at the 2018 Digital Spy Reader Awards; it came in third place with 15% of the total votes.

A 2010 poll by Just Eat to find the "most desired dinner companions" from EastEnders put Kat in second place. After the announcement of Jessie Wallace playing the role of Kat, Steve Hendry from the Sunday Mail referred to Kat as a "stunner". In February 2011, following Kat's return to EastEnders, Wallace was nominated for Best Actress at the 2011 All About Soap Bubble Awards for her portrayal of Kat, and was also nominated alongside Richie for Best Comeback. She won the Television and Radio Industries Club (TRIC) Award for "TV Soap Personality" in March 2011.

In February 2011, the scenes revealing Kat as Zoe's mother were described by Kris Green at Digital Spy as "one of the most iconic moments in the history of EastEnders". In September 2011, Kat and Andy's wedding was voted as a "wedding from hell" by Yahoo!. After the announcement that Kat is to have a miscarriage, Tony Stewart from the Daily Mirror said that after the baby swap storyline, this is perhaps "too much agony for Kat to bear". An EastEnders source added that "It is a cruel thing to happen to them after everything that they've already been through this year".

Laura-Jayne Tyler of Inside Soap enjoyed Kat's 2018 reintroduction and said that Wallace returned "on full gas, giving nothing less than her trademark powerhouse performances". She felt that Kat's return gave the show "the vital spark [it has] been missing." She added, "You can take the girl out of Walford, but you'll never take Walford out of the girl..." In 2020, Sara Wallis and Ian Hyland from The Daily Mirror placed Kat fourth on their ranked list of the best EastEnders characters of all time, calling Kat a "drama queen" with "hoop earrings and trawled-on makeup" and writing that Kat has "seen it all", including experiencing "baby swap drama to her split with Alfie, a lottery win, affairs and a murderous son".
