= Amelia Crouch =

British actress (born 2004)

- Born: Amelia Louise Crouch; 27 March 2004 (age 22)
- Occupation: Actress
- Years active: 2011–present

Amelia Louise Crouch (born 27 March 2004) is an English actress. She began her career as a child actress on the West End. Her films include The Woman in Black: Angel of Death (2014), Alice Through the Looking Glass (2016), The Limehouse Golem (2016), Extinction (2018), and The Cursed (2021).

== Early life ==
Crouch is from Epsom. Her brother Oliver is also an actor, and they took classes at Stagecoach Sutton, which their mother Rachel runs in addition to Audition Ready and Happy Feet Management. Crouch attended Southfield Park Primary School and then Rosebery School for Girls. She went on to train at Arts Educational Schools (ArtsEd).

== Career ==
Crouch made her professional stage debut in 2011 as a munchkin in Andrew Lloyd Webber's The Wizard of Oz at the London Palladium. She then appeared in an alternating role in Fatal Attraction at the Theatre Royal Haymarket in 2014. That same year, Crouch made her film debut in The Woman in Black: Angel of Death followed by her television debut in an installment of the Sky Arts anthology Playhouse Presents the following year.

In 2016, Crouch played younger versions of characters, including Sophie Cookson's Pippa in The Huntsman: Winter's War, Anne Hathaway's White Queen in Alice Through the Looking Glass, Olivia Cooke's Elizabeth "Lizzie" Cree in The Limehouse Golem, as well as Ellise Chappell's Jennifer Strange in the Sky One television film The Last Dragonslayer. This was followed by a starring role as Hanna in the 2018 science fiction film Extinction. In 2021, she played Charlotte in The Cursed and a younger version of Mary Elizabeth Winstead's titular character in Kate.

== Filmography ==
=== Film ===
Year	Title	Role	Notes
2014	The Woman in Black: Angel of Death	Flora	
2016	The Huntsman: Winter's War	Young Pippa	
2016	Alice Through the Looking Glass	Young Mirana	
2016	The Limehouse Golem	Young Elizabeth	
2017	Belle and Bamber	Belle	Short film
2018	Extinction	Hanna	
2021	The Cursed	Charlotte	
2021	Kate	Teen Kate	

=== Television ===
Year	Title	Role	Notes
2015	Playhouse Presents	Gina	Episode: "King for a Term"
2016	The Last Dragonslayer	Young Jennifer Strange	Television film
2025	EastEnders	Young Kat Slater	2 episodes

== Stage ==
Year	Title	Role	Notes
2011	The Wizard of Oz	Munchkin	London Palladium
2014	Fatal Attraction	Ellen Gallagher	Theatre Royal Haymarket, London

== Awards and nominations ==
Year	Award	Category	Work	Result	Ref.
2017	Birmingham Film Festival	Best Young Actress	Belle and Bamber	Nominated	
