= Alicia Coppola =

American actress

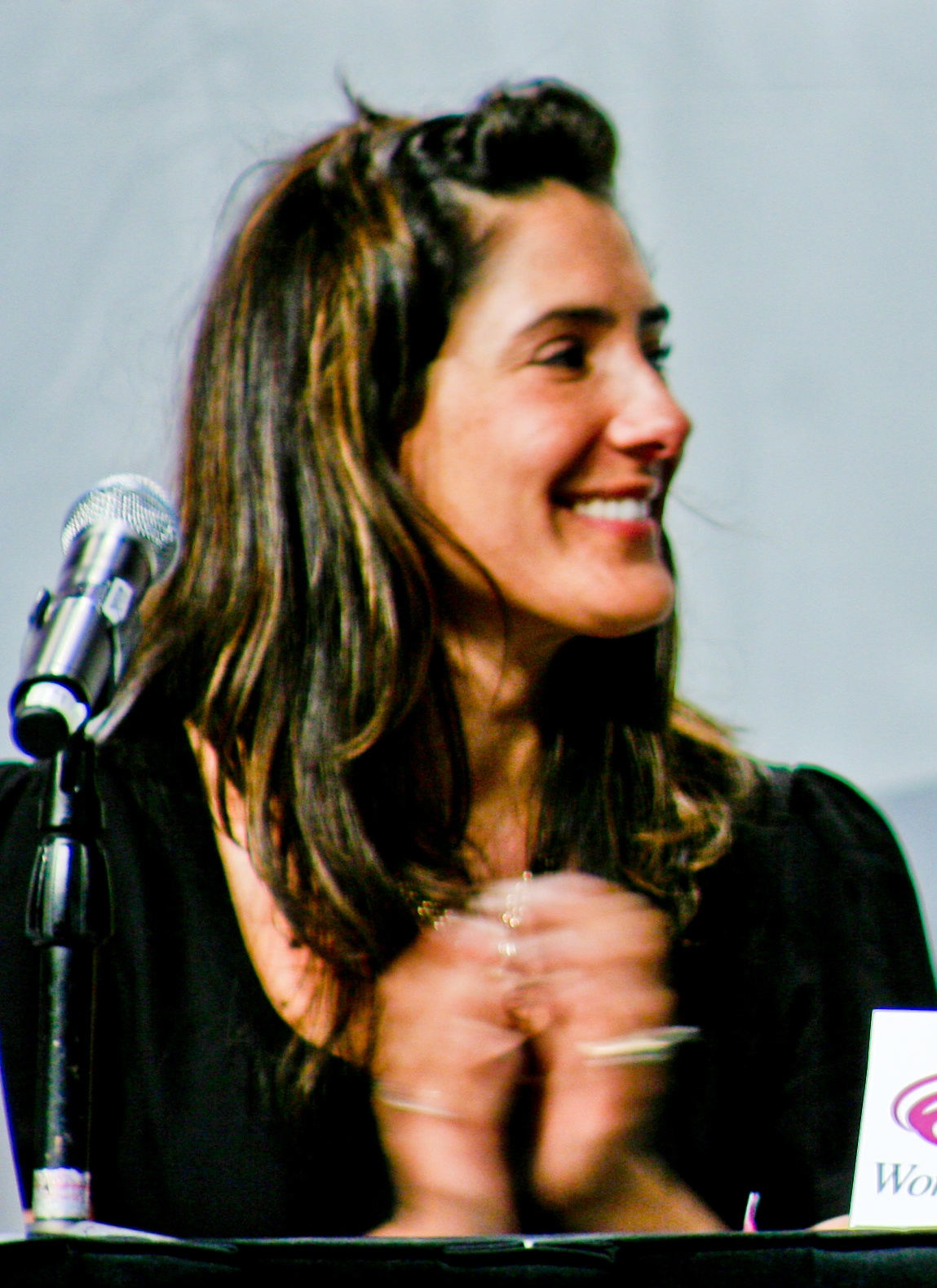
- Coppola in 2008
- Born: April 12, 1968 (age 58); Huntington, Long Island, New York, U.S.
- Education: New York University
- Occupation: Actress
- Years active: 1991–present
- Spouse: Anthony Michael Jones
- Children: 3

Alicia Coppola (born April 12, 1968) is an American actress and author. She became known for playing Lorna Devon in the soap opera Another World from 1991 to 1994. Afterwards, she made regular and guest star appearances in various television series, notably Jericho and Blood & Treasure, and appeared in films such as National Treasure: Book of Secrets.

== Early life ==
Coppola was born and raised in Huntington, Long Island, New York in an Italian American family. She graduated from Kent School in 1986 and New York University in 1990 with a degree in philosophy and anthropology. She originally planned to attend law school, but instead went into modeling, signing with Elite Modeling Agency.

Coppola is not related to the Coppola family.

== Career ==
Coppola's first TV appearance was in 1988 in an uncredited role on Saturday Night Live, playing a party guest of Michael Dukakis. Her first credited role was as hostess during the fourth season of the MTV game show Remote Control, replacing Kari Wuhrer, from 1989 to 1990.

In 1991, Coppola joined the cast of the soap opera Another World, playing the vixen Lorna Devon, the long-lost daughter of popular character Felicia Gallant. She played the role until 1994.

Coppola's better-known TV jobs have included a recurring role on Trinity (1998–99), a starring role on the American remake of the British comedy Cold Feet (1999), and top billing on the TNT drama Bull (2000). She played Leesa in a 1999 episode of Sports Night, appeared briefly as Betazoid Lt. Stadi in the pilot episode of Star Trek: Voyager, played a cannibalistic murderer on CSI: Crime Scene Investigation, and a widow who marries her late husband's killer on Law & Order: Criminal Intent. Coppola appeared several times as JAG lawyer Lieutenant Commander Faith Coleman on JAG and NCIS, although she also appeared in a season 2 episode of CBS' NCIS: Los Angeles ("Little Angels") as a different character, FBI agent Amy Rand, an expert on kidnapping cases, and then once again as a third new character in NCIS: Origins. Coppola also played multiple characters in separate episodes of Crossing Jordan; she played a detective in a 2003 episode, and later took on the unusual role of a female serial killer agreeing to help catch her copycat in the 2005 episode titled "Road Kill". Similarly, she appeared on Two and a Half Men as Dr. Michelle Talmadge, in the episode "Woo-Hoo, a Hernia Exam!" (2005), and then a different character, TC Randall, in a 2013 episode. In 2003, she starred alongside Gary Oldman and Ving Rhames in the film Sin, and played a rehab patient and producer, Toni Stark, on an episode of Dawson's Creek. She had a recurring role on NBC's American Dreams, playing the role of Nancy.

Coppola played a short role on the Fox television series Bones in 2005 as Joy Deaver in the episode "The Girl in the Fridge".

Coppola had a role as a Muslim intelligence analyst working for the Los Angeles branch of the Counter Terrorist Unit (CTU), in a single episode of 24, named Azara ("1–2 am" during Day 4). All four of her scenes were cut from the broadcast episode, but are restored as extras on the Day 4 DVD. In them, she discovers a lead in the investigation which is originally dismissed by fellow analyst Edgar Stiles, who suspects her because of her religion. Edgar later apologizes to her when her lead turns out to be important.

Starting in the fall of 2006, Coppola appeared in the recurring role of IRS Agent Mimi Clark in the post-apocalyptic drama Jericho. She became a series regular in February 2007. She played FBI Agent Spellman in National Treasure: Book of Secrets, also directed by Jericho executive producer Jon Turteltaub.

Coppola has also appeared on The Nine Lives of Chloe King as Valentina, the leader of the Mai. She appeared on Monk in "Mr. Monk and the Blackout" as the power plant public relations spokesperson and as Monk's date. She appeared in the MTV series Teen Wolf as the powerful Alpha werewolf Talia Hale.

In 2014, Coppola appeared on Sons of Anarchy as Mildred Treal in the episode "Faith and Despondency". She returned to daytime soap operas for the first time in twenty years when she took a recurring role on CBS's The Young and the Restless in spring 2016. Coppola appeared as Dr. Tammy Brunner in a 2017 episode of Designated Survivor.

Coppola had a recurring role as Carrie Walsh, the owner of a questionable drug rehabilitation facility called Winding Path, in season 6 of the first responder procedural 9-1-1.

In 2013, Coppola published a non-fiction book titled Gracefully Gone, which combines excerpts from her late father's journals and her own. Her father's journal entries are from 1982, two years after he was diagnosed with and then went into remission from brain cancer, while her own are from 1990 and 1991 when she was around 22, during the last six months of his life.

Coppola made her producing, directing and screenwriting debut in a 2017 short film, Between Us. Coppola also acted in the film, which was based on her father's death. Between Us was shown at the Los Angeles Feedback Film Festival in 2018 and at the Artemis Women in Action Film Festival in 2019. She also wrote and directed the 2024 short film And You Are...? starring Jane Seymour and Zack Barack. The film explores the relationship between a grandmother with dementia and her transgender grandson, gaining inspiration from having both a family member with Alzheimer's disease and a transgender son herself. And You Are...? was shown at the Beverley Hills Film Festival and the CinePride Film Festival.

== Personal life ==
Coppola is married to actor, writer, and producer Anthony Michael Jones, best known for appearing in General Hospital as Father Coates, a recurring occasional role which he played in 11 episodes from 2002 through 2010. They have three children, two daughters and a son. She is not related to Francis Ford Coppola.

== Filmography ==
Film roles
Year	Title	Role	Notes
1999	Velocity Trap	Beth Sheffield, FED 397 Navigator	
2001	Zigs	Rachel	
2002	Fresh Cut Grass	Macy Burns	
2003	Welcome to the Neighborhood	Helen	
2003	Sin	Bella	
2003	Becoming Marty	The Attorney	
2007	National Treasure: Book of Secrets	FBI Agent Spellman	
2015	We Are Your Friends	Mrs. Romero	
2017	A Cowgirl's Story	Lieutenant Helen Rhodes	Direct-to-video film
2022	Blink	The Nurse	Short film

Television and video game roles
Year	Title	Role	Notes
1988	Saturday Night Live	Dukakis' Party Guest	Episode: "Matthew Modine/Edie Brickell & New Bohemians"; uncredited
1991	Against the Law	Kathleen	Episode: "Evil Conduct"
1991–1994	Another World	Lorna Devon	Regular role
1992	The Keys	Terry	Television film
1994	NYPD Blue	Paula Anderson	Episode: "Simone Says"
1995	Star Trek: Voyager	Lieutenant Stadi	Episode: "Caretaker"
1995	New York Undercover	Detective Carson	Episode: "The Smoking Section"
1995	The Great Defender	Camille	Episode: "Camille"
1995	Touched by an Angel	Ava	Episode: "Unidentified Female"
1996	The Lazarus Man	Libby Custer	Episode: "The Boy General"
1996	For the Future: The Irvine Fertility Scandal	Nurse Beth	Television film
1996	The Burning Zone	Dana Tierney	Episode: "Faces in the Night"
1997	Chicago Hope	Alice Bishop	Episode: "Verdicts"
1997	The Sentinel	Samantha	Episodes: "Light My Fire", "Disappearing Act"
1998	Pensacola: Wings of Gold	Donna Francis	Episode: "Company Town"
1998	The Perfect Getaway	Alex Vaughn	Television film
1998	Profiler	Deputy Anita Pessoa	Episode: "Every Five Minutes"
1998–1999	Trinity	Detective Patricia Damiana	Recurring role (season 1)
1999	Sports Night	Lessa	Episode: "Small Town"
1999	Any Day Now	Unknown	Episode: "You Promise? I Promise"
1999	Cold Feet	Karen Chandler	Main role (season 1)
2000	Blood Money	Gloria Restrelli	Television film
2000–2001	Bull	Marissa Rufo	Main role (season 1)
2001	CSI: Crime Scene Investigation	Dr. Susan Hillridge	Episode: "Justice Is Served"
2002	Ally McBeal	Holly Richardson	Episode: "Love Is All Around Part 1 & Part 2"
2002	Framed	Lucy Santini	Television film
2003	Dawson's Creek	Toni Stark	Episode: "Clean and Sober"
2003	The Dead Zone	Anita / Nicholas	Episode: "Misbegotten"
2003	JAG	Lieutenant Commander Faith Coleman	Episodes: "Ice Queen", "Meltdown"
2003	Law & Order: Criminal Intent	Isobel Carnicki	Episode: "But Not Forgotten"
2003	The Lyon’s Den	Riley	Episode: "Trick or Treat"
2003	Judging Amy	District Attorney Danielle Casey	Episode: "Kilt Trip"
2003	Miracles	Georgia Wilson	Episode: "The Letter"
2003	Crossing Jordan	Detective Meredith "Merry" Stackhouse	Episode: "Sunset Division"
2003–2004	American Dreams	Nancy	Recurring role (season 2)
2004	The Division	Liz	Episode: "Be Careful What You Wish For"
2004	Monk	Michelle Rivas	Episode: "Mr. Monk and the Blackout"
2004	Jack & Bobby	Abigail Marks	Episode: "Valentino"
2004	Huff	Laura Linden	Episode: "Cold Day in Shanghai"
2004–2005	NCIS	Lieutenant Commander Faith Coleman	Episodes: "UnSEALeD", "Call of Silence", "Hometown Hero"
2005	Las Vegas	Monica Wells	Episode: "The Lie Is Cast"
2005	Jake in Progress	Alison	Episode: "Stand by Your Man"
2005	Blind Justice	Debbie Diament	Episode: "Doggone"
2005	Crossing Jordan	Ryan Kessler	Episode: "Road Kill"
2005	Bones	Joy Deaver	Episode: "The Girl in the Fridge"
2005–2013	Two and a Half Men	Dr. Michelle Talmadge / T.C. Randall	Episode: "Woo-Hoo, a Hernia-Exam!", "Throgwarten Middle School Mysteries"
2005	24	Azara Nasir	Episode: "Day 4: 1:00 a.m. – 2:00 a.m." (deleted, later extras)
2006–2008	Jericho	Mimi Clark	Recurring role (season 1); main role (season 2)
2007	Black Widow	Melanie Dempsey	Television film
2009	Marvel: Ultimate Alliance 2	She-Hulk	Video game; voice role
2009	Drop Dead Diva	Dr. Dumont	Episode: "Grayson’s Anatomy"
2009	Lie to Me	Sheila Redatti	Episode: "Lack of Candor"
2010–2022	NCIS: Los Angeles	FBI Agent Lisa Rand	5 episodes
2011	Castle	Amber Patinelli	Episode: "The Final Nail"
2011	Detroit 1-8-7	Linda Garrety	Episode: "Motor City Blues"
2011	The Nine Lives of Chloe King	Velentina	Mini Series
2011	Suits	Alexandra Leeds	Episode: "Rules of the Game"
2011	Revenge	Melissa Andetson	Episode: "Charade"
2012	Common Law	Jonelle	Recurring role (season 1)
2013	Teen Wolf	Talia Hale	Episode: "Visionary"
2014	Criminal Minds	Lisa Randall	Episode: "The Itch"
2014	Sons of Anarchy	Mildred Treal	Episode: "Faith and Despondency"
2015	Code Black	Karen Irving	Episode: "The Son Rises"
2016	Those Who Can't	Coach Manhallana	Episode: "What's Eating Uncle Jake?"
2016	The Young and the Restless	Dr. Meredith Gates	Recurring role
2016	MacGyver	Ambassador Roberts	Episode: "Chisel"
2016–2018	Shameless	Sue	Recurring role (seasons 7–8)
2017	Major Crimes	Joanne Harris	Episode: "Intersection"
2017	Designated Survivor	Dr. Tammy Bruner	Episode: "Outbreak"
2019	The Rookie	Detective Murphy	Episode: "Greenlight"
2019	Empire	Megan Conway	Recurring role (season 5)
2019	Blood & Treasure	Dr. Ana Castillo	Main role
2019	Why Women Kill	Sheila Mosconi	Recurring role
2020; 2023	All Rise	Wanda Taylor	3 episodes
2021	Generation	Carol	Recurring role
2022–2024	Law & Order	Defense Attorney Audrey Keller	2 episodes
2022–2023	9-1-1	Carrie Walsh	3 episodes
2025	Chicago Med	Sloane Hunter	Episode: "Broken Hearts"
2026	NCIS: Origins	Julia Cane	Episode: "Who's Gonna Drive You Home?"
