= Sin (2003 film) =

- DVD cover
- Directed by: Michael Stevens
- Written by: Tim Willocks
- Produced by: David Leyrer; John Saviano; Michael Stevens; Tim Willocks; Douglas Urbanski
- Starring: Gary Oldman; Ving Rhames; Kerry Washington; Alicia Coppola; Chris Spencer
- Cinematography: Zoran Popovic
- Edited by: Suzanne Fenn
- Music by: Michael Giacchino
- Production company: Leyrer/Stevens Entertainment
- Distributed by: Columbia TriStar Home Entertainment
- Release date: December 3, 2003
- Running time: 107 minutes
- Language: English

Sin is a 2003 American crime thriller film directed by Michael Stevens. It stars Gary Oldman and Ving Rhames, with a supporting cast including Kerry Washington, Alicia Coppola and Chris Spencer. The film, which was released direct-to-video, has been censured by Oldman.

== Plot synopsis ==
Retired Reno, Nevada police officer Eddie Burns (Ving Rhames) goes in search of his wayward sister Kassie (Kerry Washington). Along the way, his past wrongdoings make him the target of a revenge campaign by enigmatic criminal Charlie Strom (Gary Oldman).

== Cast ==
- Gary Oldman as Charlie Kraken / Charlie Strom
- Ving Rhames as Eddie Burns
- Kerry Washington as Kassie Burns
- Alicia Coppola as Bella
- Chris Spencer as Vincent Peavey
- Bill Sage as Detective Cal Brody
- Brian Cox as Captain Oakes
- Gregg Henry as Conrad
- Arie Verveen as Marty Kraken
- Daniel Dae Kim as Lakorn
- James Lew as Leo Thamaree
- Woon Young Park as Chaviat
- Jeremiah Birkett as Wayne
- Ray Porter as Jeff
- Johnny Strong as Jerry
- Chris Freeman as Jackson
- David Fofi as "Nemo"
- Colin Keogh as "Slick"
- Johnny Savas as Hugo
- Valerie Red-Horse as Dr. Gregson
- Sonny Surowiec as Grady White
- Briana Banks as Blonde Adult Actress
- Jessica Drake as Brunette Adult Actress
- Carol Axler Turner as Motel Clerk (credited Carol Turner)

== Reception ==
=== Critical reaction ===
Dominic Wills of TalkTalk described Sin as "a kind of cross between Death Wish and 8mm." DVD Talk journalist Shannon Nutt awarded the film two stars out of five, and wrote: "Sin makes for a decent rental... The plotline is rather predictable and similar to many other cop dramas you'll find out there, but the acting of both Rhames and Oldman put Sin just a notch above other releases in the same genre." Forrest Hartman of the Reno Gazette-Journal gave the movie a "C−" score, and said: "It lacks the tension and cohesion that might have made it good. Locals may appreciate the nice Nevada backdrops, but there's not much more to recommend." Critic Dennis Schwartz also rated the film "C−", calling it a "weakly directed revenge tale" with "stilted dialogue, a tired story, schematic action scenes, a questionable moral compass and uninspired acting (even from the noted headliners)". Guardian writer Xan Brooks felt that with Sin, Oldman accepted a "barrel-scraping" role at the "low point" of his career.

=== Oldman's response ===
Oldman admitted in a 2005 interview with Time Out that he signed onto Sin purely for money, as he had not acted in some time and had recently settled a divorce. He said of the film: "Oh God, that's possibly the worst movie ever made. I even felt sorry for the trees they cut down for the script paper... If you're a connoisseur of the terrible, you might get a twisted joy out of it."
