= Extinction (2018 film) =

2018 film by Ben Young

- Film release poster
- Directed by: Ben Young
- Screenplay by: Spenser Cohen; Brad Kane
- Story by: Spenser Cohen
- Produced by: David Hoberman; Nathan Kahane; Todd Lieberman
- Starring: Michael Peña; Lizzy Caplan; Mike Colter; Amelia Crouch; Erica Tremblay; Israel Broussard; Lex Shrapnel; Emma Booth
- Cinematography: Pedro Luque
- Edited by: Matthew Ramsey
- Music by: The Newton Brothers
- Production companies: Good Universe; Mandeville Films
- Distributed by: Netflix
- Release date: July 27, 2018
- Running time: 95 minutes
- Country: United States
- Language: English
- Budget: $20 million

Extinction is a 2018 American science fiction action film directed by Ben Young and written by Spenser Cohen and Brad Kane. The film is about a father who has a recurring dream/vision about the loss of his family while witnessing an evil force bent on destruction. The film stars Michael Peña, Lizzy Caplan, Mike Colter, Lilly Aspell, Emma Booth, Israel Broussard, and Lex Shrapnel.

Extinction was filmed over 40 days in Belgrade, Serbia, on a budget of $20 million. It had originally been scheduled for a theatrical release on January 26, 2018, by Universal Pictures, but was pulled from the release schedule. The film was acquired from Universal by Netflix, which released it on July 27, 2018. It received negative reviews, with criticism for its confused and weak storyline, character development and pacing.

== Plot ==
In an unspecified future, Peter, an engineer, has recurring nightmares in which he and everyone he knows suffer through violent, alien invasion-like confrontations with an unknown enemy. This causes him to have a strained relationship with his wife, Alice, and his daughters Hanna and Lucy. He reluctantly visits a clinic to receive psychiatric help, only to find a patient there who reveals that he is having the same visions, and that the psychiatric 'help' would only suppress these visions. This prompts Peter to believe his visions are of an upcoming invasion.

That night, invading spaceships open fire on the city, causing significant damage. Peter and Alice barricade their apartment amid the sounds of slaughter from ground troops. An armored alien soldier breaks through the barricade and finds Lucy hiding under a table. The soldier pauses to examine the girl, which allows Peter and Alice to immobilize the soldier. Peter, now armed with the soldier's weapon, leads his family out of the building.

Based on his visions, Peter and his family agree to seek shelter at the factory where he works. He is able to bypass the rifle's biometric authentication and kill the soldiers guarding the apartment building's exit. They make their way to a tunnel entrance to safely travel to the factory, but not before Alice is injured from a bomb blast. As they regroup, the soldier from their apartment appears, having tracked them with a homing signal on the rifle Peter took. To Peter's shock, the soldier removes his helmet and appears human. Peter forces the soldier to carry Alice to the factory. There, his boss David explains that the invasion has been expected for many years. A medic examines Alice but informs Peter that he cannot save her. As David's men drag the invading soldier off to execute him, he yells to Peter that he can save Alice. Peter agrees to stay with the soldier to save Alice. David will evacuate their children to a subway station where a transport train awaits to take them all to an offsite base.

The soldier surprises Peter by revealing that Alice is a synthetic (AI). To save Alice, she needs an alternate source of power: Peter himself. At the soldier's guidance, Peter cuts open his own chest with a pocket knife, confirming that he is also a synthetic. The soldier connects a cable between the two synthetics and Peter passes out, experiencing in detail what he had thought were visions of the future, but are actually memories of a past war; fearing that android workers ("synthetics") might rise up against humans, the military attacked unarmed synthetics. The synthetics fought back and eventually drove all humans off the planet. Peter and Alice met during the tension, and while fighting the humans, they found Hanna and Lucy, who are also synthetics. To deal with the guilt of what they have done and prevent themselves from living in fear of a reprisal from humans, most synthetics (including Peter and his family) wiped their memories and lived as humans, unaware of their nature or history.

Peter wakes up and the soldier, Miles, explains that humans have been living on Mars for 50 years. He had expected the synths to be monsters, not families with children, and after getting a good look at Lucy under the table, decided that he could not kill anyone. Peter and Alice part amicably with Miles to find their daughters as the humans breach the roof of the factory. As they all depart on the train, David explains that he and a handful of other synthetics kept their memories to stay prepared for the inevitable return of the humans. Peter suggests that some day there could be peace between humans and synthetics.

And as the train drives forward leaving the city behind, the tracks behind it slowly disappear into the water. The family looks out of the back window wondering what will happen next. The train then rides into a tunnel, with the last track dropping into the water and the tunnel imploding, sealing the synthetics off from the place they called home. An aerial view above the imploded tunnel shows lush trees and high mountains, thus indicating the synthetics will likely start their lives over, somewhere far away from humans.

== Cast ==
- Michael Peña as Peter, Alice's husband and father of Hanna and Lucy.
- Lizzy Caplan as Alice, Peter's wife and mother of Hanna and Lucy.
- Mike Colter as David, Peter's boss
- Amelia Crouch as Hanna, Alice and Peter's daughter
- Erica Tremblay as Lucy, Alice and Peter's daughter
- Israel Broussard as Miles, a soldier
- Lex Shrapnel as Ray, Samantha's husband
- Emma Booth as Samantha, Ray's wife
- Lilly Aspell as Megan, Ray and Samantha's daughter
- Nikola Kent as Luke, Peter's coworker

== Production ==
In December 2013, it was revealed that the screenplay for Extinction, written by Spenser Cohen, had been included in the 2013 Black List of the year's best unproduced scripts in Hollywood, as voted on by more than 250 studio execs. In January 2014, Joe Johnston signed on to direct the film, and in September 2016, it was revealed that James McAvoy was "in talks" to star.

In October 2016, Ben Young signed on to direct the film, with Johnston having left the project a while back. In January 2017, it was announced that Michael Peña would star in the role McAvoy had been courted for. In February 2017, Universal Pictures acquired worldwide distribution rights to the film, with filming set to begin in April 2017. In March 2017, Lizzy Caplan and Israel Broussard joined the cast, while Mike Colter and Lex Shrapnel joined in April, and Emma Booth in May. Filming took place over 40 days in Belgrade, Serbia, on a budget of $20 million.

== Release ==
Extinction was released on July 27, 2018, on Netflix. The film had been scheduled for a theatrical release on January 26, 2018, by Universal Pictures, but was pulled from the release schedule. Later in February 2018, it was reported that Netflix had acquired the film from Universal.

== Reception ==
On review aggregator website Rotten Tomatoes, the film holds an approval rating of 32% based on 25 reviews, and an average rating of 4.1/10. The website's critical consensus reads, "Extinction has a few intriguing ideas, but they -- and some game performances from its talented stars -- are lost in the movie's muddled plot and frustrating pacing." On Metacritic, the film has a weighted average score of 40 out of 100, based on 6 critics, indicating "mixed or average" reviews.

Jake Nevins of The Guardian gave it 2/5 stars and called the film "a competent, if formulaic film", writing that, by virtue of not being viewed theatrically, the film's flaws are magnified and its strengths were weakened. In his 1.5/4 star review for RogerEbert.com, Nick Allen wrote "There's a tightness that I respect with Extinction. It's not so much a thrill-ride but a movie monorail, with one revelation at the end meant to reconsider the entire journey. That speaks to its efficiency as the latest in mindless, if not attention-less Netflix movies. Extinction doesn't seek to be much, but it's just not all that charming, either."
