= Sophie Thatcher =

American actress (born 2000)

- Thatcher at the Deauville American Film Festival in 2026
- Born: Sophie Bathsheba Thatcher; October 18, 2000 (age 26); Chicago, Illinois, U.S.
- Occupations: Actress; musician
- Years active: 2012–present

Sophie Bathsheba Thatcher (born October 18, 2000) is an American actress and musician. She began her acting career as a child in local stage plays and made her feature film debut in the science fiction film Prospect (2018). She had her breakthrough as Natalie in the Showtime television thriller series Yellowjackets (2021–present).

Thatcher played lead roles in the horror films The Boogeyman (2023) and Heretic (2024) and the science fiction thrillers Companion (2025) and Her Private Hell (2026). For her work in Companion, she earned a Critics' Choice Super Award. On television, she also played Drash in the Disney+ space western miniseries Star Wars: The Book of Boba Fett (2021–2022).

== Early life ==
Sophie Bathsheba Thatcher was born on October 18, 2000 in Chicago, Illinois. She has an older brother named Alexander, a writer; an older sister named Emma, a filmmaker; and an identical twin sister named Ellie, a visual artist. She started singing at a young age, and wrote her first song later at 14. She has described her family as musical, with her mother being a piano teacher. She herself was classically trained into her teens and started voice lessons at age 9, also at one point singing in a choir. Her parents divorced when she was 14, and she has described her father as "out of the equation."

Thatcher spent her early childhood in Chicago's Hyde Park neighborhood and later grew up in Lake Forest, Illinois. She began acting at age four, entering a performing arts school to pursue musical theater and Broadway. In eighth grade, she moved to Evanston, Illinois where she attended Nichols Middle School, also spending time in homeschooling due to her acting schedule. She later went to Evanston Township High School for one year before completing her high school education in homeschooling. Afterwards, she moved to New York City in order to take Meisner technique classes.

== Acting career ==
=== 2012–2020: Theater and early screen roles ===
Thatcher began acting professionally at age 11 in a 2012 production of The Secret Garden in Chicago. She was later involved in stage productions of Oliver!, Seussical, and Our Town. She also portrayed Anne Frank in a 2015 production of The Diary of Anne Frank. On screen, Thatcher first appeared in the short film Growing Strong (2015). In 2016, she guested on the police procedural series Chicago P.D., an installment in the Chicago franchise. That same year, she and her twin sister Ellie appeared in a music video for the Lincoln Squares' song "Brighter Days". Later, she made another guest appearance in the horror series The Exorcist (2016), where she played a younger version of Regan MacNeil.

Thatcher made her feature film debut in the science fiction film Prospect (2018), starring alongside Pedro Pascal and Jay Duplass, the latter of whom plays her father. Her performance was praised, with Variety describing her as "a fresh face who tricks us into assuming she's just a callow teen, when in fact, she proves to be the film's toughest character." Later in 2018, she had a recurring role in the third season of the medical drama series Chicago Med, another entry in the Chicago franchise. In 2019, she made her second feature film appearance in The Tomorrow Man. In 2020, she starred in the short-form Quibi streaming series When the Streetlights Go On.

=== 2021–present: Yellowjackets and film expansion ===
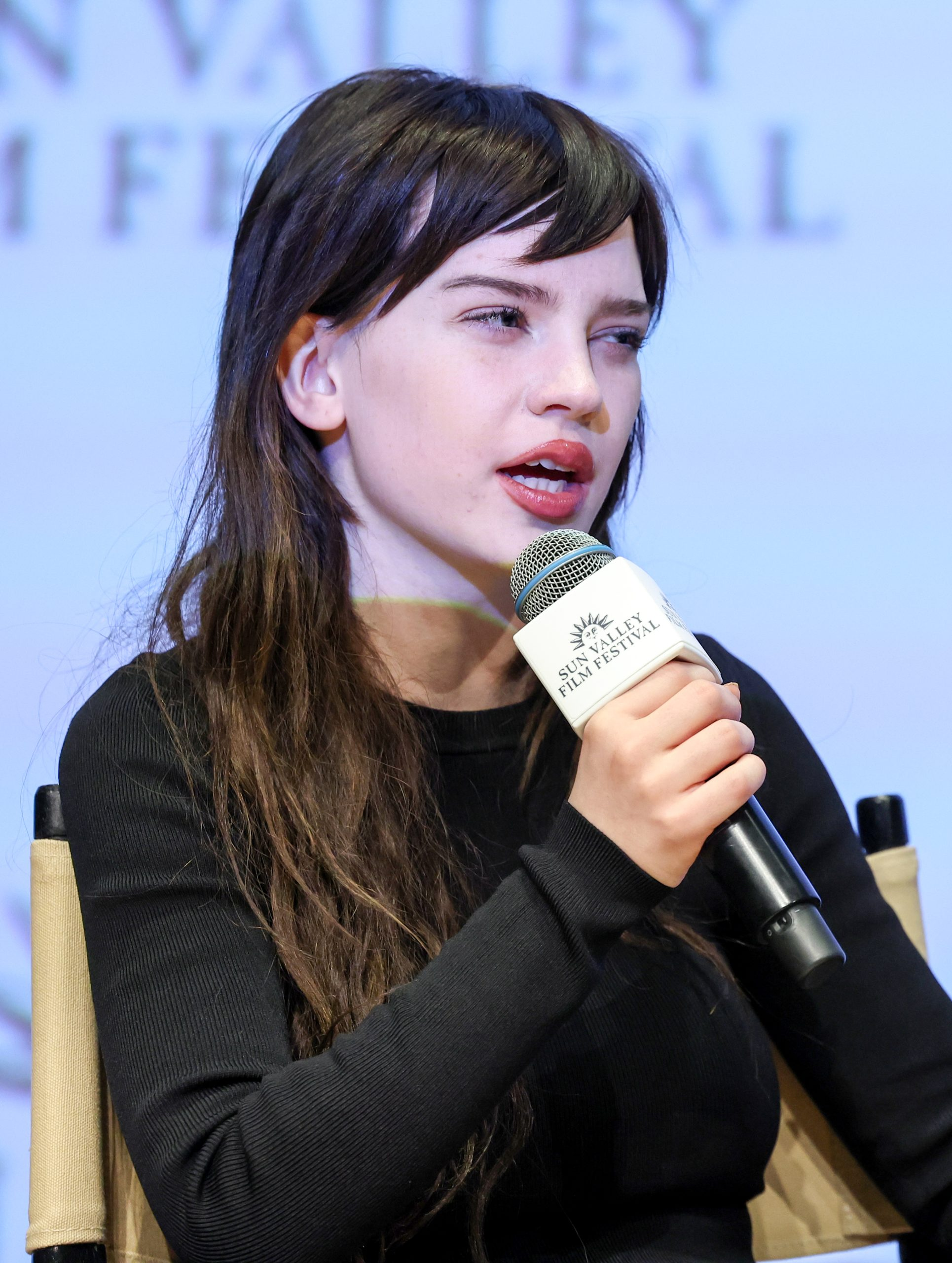
Thatcher at the 2023 Sun Valley Film Festival

In November 2021, Thatcher had her breakthrough role in the Showtime series Yellowjackets, sharing the part of Natalie with Juliette Lewis, who played the character's adult counterpart. In searching for "someone who was really free-spirited and unique who could play both a sort of wildness and a vulnerability" for the role, show creators Ashley Lyle and Bart Nickerson landed on Thatcher after she had submitted an audition tape that impressed them; her casting came prior to that of Lewis, who was sought to match her.

In early 2022, Thatcher appeared in the Star Wars streaming series The Book of Boba Fett on Disney+. In March, she appeared in the music video for rock band Pavement's 1999 song "Harness Your Hopes." Also that month, she starred in the horror short film Blink, which premiered at SXSW and was made available on YouTube soon thereafter. Later that year, she served as an executive producer on her older sister Emma's film Provo. She next starred in the horror film The Boogeyman (2023), based on Stephen King's short story of the same name.

Thatcher and Chloe East, both former members of the LDS Church, played Mormon missionaries in the horror film Heretic (2024) opposite Hugh Grant. In 2025, she starred in the science fiction thriller Companion. In 2026, Forbes included her in their annual 30 Under 30 list. She next appeared in Nicolas Winding Refn's film Her Private Hell with Charles Melton, Kristine Froseth and Havana Rose Liu, which premiered out of competition at Cannes 2026.

==== Upcoming projects ====
Thatcher will next appear in the following films: the Hong Kong-set comedy Peaches, also with Liu; the British action thriller Cavendish, with Erin Kellyman and Joe Alwyn; and Jennifer Kent's sci-fi film The Girl Who Was Plugged In, based on the James Tiptree Jr. novella of the same name, which will have Thatcher in dual roles.

== Music career ==
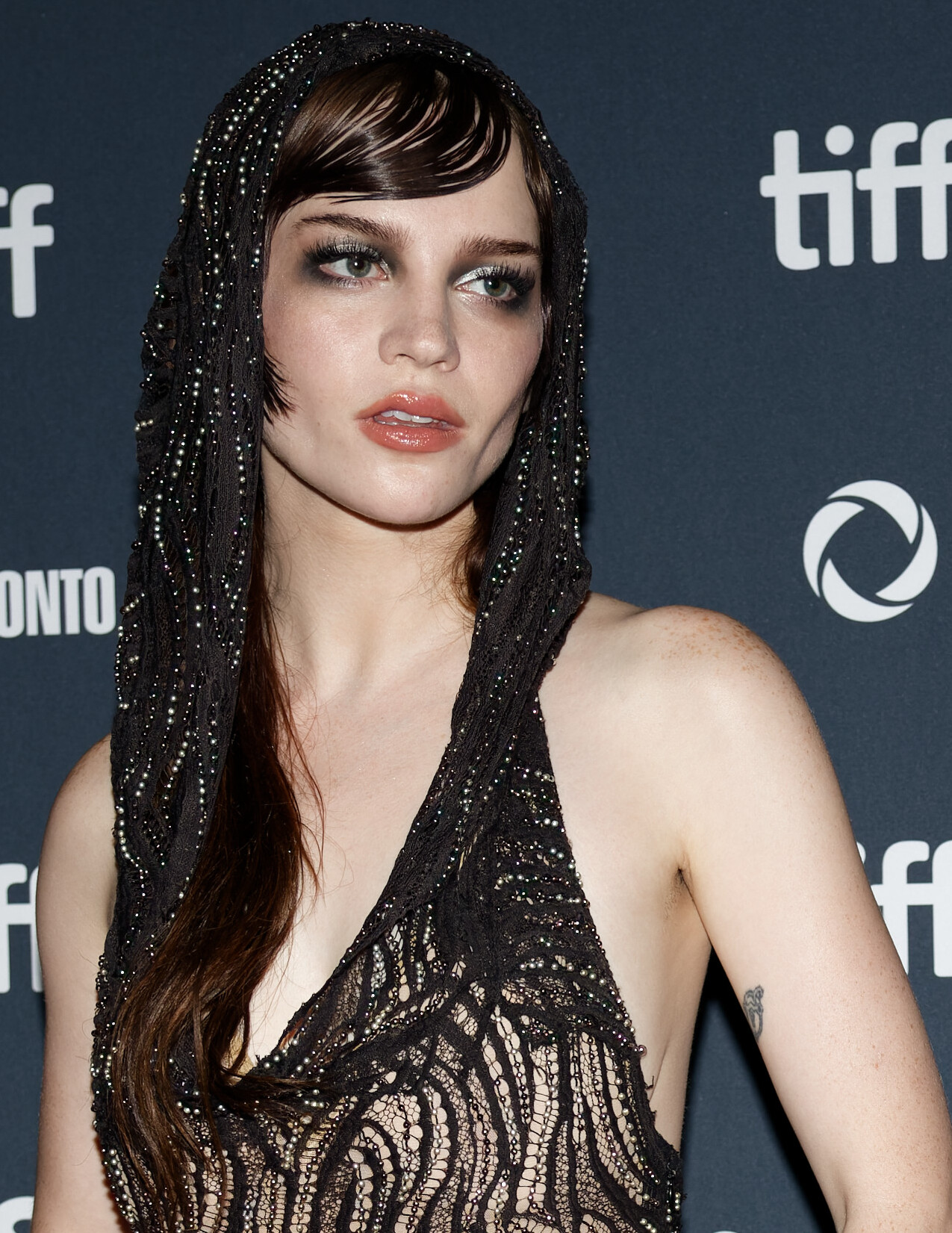
Thatcher at the 2024 Toronto International Film Festival

Thatcher began making music at the end of high school, experimenting with an Omnichord, a MIDI synthesizer, and the music software Ableton, occasionally releasing tracks on Bandcamp. She released her debut EP, entitled Pivot & Scrape, on October 11, 2024, after having released two singles. On November 8 of that year, she also released a cover of Bob Dylan's "Knockin' on Heaven's Door" for her film Heretic. Thatcher describes her music as experimental pop.

In 2025, Thatcher provided vocals for "Iris's Theme", a track on Hrishikesh Hirway's score to her film Companion. That March, she collaborated with Maral on a cover of Sparklehorse's "Sad & Beautiful World" for We Love It Here, a music compilation benefitting the North Carolinian nonprofit organization Lamplight AVL.

== Personal life ==
In 2022, Thatcher began dating musician Austin Feinstein. In 2024, she lived in the Nichols Canyon neighborhood of Los Angeles, after having lived in Silver Lake with Feinstein the previous year. As of 2026, she lived in Upstate New York. She has obsessive–compulsive disorder and has previously discussed struggling with body dysmorphia.

=== Religious beliefs ===
Although Thatcher was raised in a Mormon household, she left the church in her early adolescence (Note: Sources vary on when exactly she left the church. The following ages have been reported: 12; 12 or 13; 13; 14) and now considers herself agnostic. Her mother was supportive of the decision, and her older siblings had done the same earlier on. Speaking about the faith, she said, "It was hard growing up Mormon, [...] I don’t think it’s evil, I just don’t think it’s right for me. But as a kid it just made me so angry. Working was a good way to get out of going to church."

=== Political views ===
In March 2025, Thatcher shared an Instagram post condemning the Israeli attacks on the Gaza Strip that occurred in that month. In June 2025, she was one of 115 musical artists who joined creative studio Ride or Cry's campaign supporting the Abolish ICE movement. Speaking to i-D about her public opposition to the Gaza genocide and ICE in 2026, she said,

It's easy to get into a bubble when you're an actor and living this world, and I never want to fall into that trap. I try to stay in tune and use my platform, because, you know, my career doesn't matter. Now that I actually have a following, I'd rather spread information [about] what's going on in the world than be silent.

== Filmography ==
Left to right: Thatcher, Her Private Hell director Nicolas Winding Refn, and co-star Charles Melton at the 2026 Cannes Film Festival

Key
†	Denotes films that have not yet been released

=== Film ===
List of Sophie Thatcher's film roles and appearances
Year	Title	Role	Notes
2015	Growing Strong	Lily Strong	Short film
2018	Prospect	Cee	
2019	The Tomorrow Man	Jeanine	
2022	Blink	Mary	Short film
2022	Provo	—N/a	Executive producer only
2023	The Boogeyman	Sadie Harper	
2024	MaXXXine	FX Artist	Cameo
2024	Heretic	Sister Barnes	
2025	Companion	Iris	
2026	Her Private Hell	Elle Thunders	
TBA	Peaches †	Nora	Post-production

=== Television ===
List of Sophie Thatcher's television roles and appearances
Year	Title	Role	Notes
2016	Chicago P.D.	Carolyn Clifford	Episode: "Knocked the Family Right Out"
2016	The Exorcist	Young Regan MacNeil	2 episodes
2018	Chicago Med	Deb	4 episodes
2020	When the Streetlights Go On	Becky Monroe	Main role
2021–present	Yellowjackets	Teenage Natalie "Nat" Scatorccio	Main role
2022	The Book of Boba Fett	Drash	3 episodes

=== Music videos ===
List of Sophie Thatcher's music video appearances
Year	Song	Artist
2016	"Brighter Days"	The Lincoln Squares
2022	"Harness Your Hopes"	Pavement
2024	"Black and Blue"	Herself
2024	"Pivot & Scrape"	Herself

== Discography ==
=== Extended plays ===
List of extended plays, showing release date, label and chart positions
Title	Details
Pivot & Scrape	Released: October 11, 2024; Label: Bathsheba; Format: Digital download, streaming

=== Singles ===
List of singles, showing year released, chart positions and album name
Title	Year	Album
"Black and Blue"	2024	Pivot & Scrape
"Pivot & Scrape"	2024	Pivot & Scrape
"Knockin' on Heaven's Door"	2024	Heretic Original Soundtrack

=== Guest appearances ===
List of non-single guest appearances, with other performing artists, showing year released and album name
Title	Year	Other artist(s)	Album
"Iris's Theme"	2025	Hrishikesh Hirway	Companion (Original Motion Picture Soundtrack)
"I'm Everything to You"	2025	Hrishikesh Hirway	Companion (Original Motion Picture Soundtrack)
"Go to Sleep"	2025	Hrishikesh Hirway	Companion (Original Motion Picture Soundtrack)

== Awards and nominations ==
List of Sophie Thatcher's awards and nominations
Award	Year	Category	Work	Result	Ref.
Astra Film Awards	2026	Best Performance in a Horror or Thriller	Companion	Nominated	
Astra Midseason Movie Awards	2025	Best Actress	Companion	Nominated	
Astra TV Awards	2024	Best Supporting Actress in a Broadcast Network or Cable Drama Series	Yellowjackets	Nominated	
Critics' Choice Super Awards	2025	Best Actress in a Science Fiction/Fantasy Movie	Companion	Won	
Deauville American Film Festival	2026	Deauville Rising-Star Award	Her Private Hell	Won	
Fangoria Chainsaw Awards	2025	Best Lead Performance	Companion	Nominated	
