= Derek Cecil =

American actor

- Born: January 5, 1973 (age 53); Amarillo, Texas, U.S.
- Education: University of Houston, Clear Lake (BFA); American Conservatory Theater (MFA)
- Occupation: Actor
- Years active: 1995–present

Derek Cecil (born January 5, 1973) is an American actor. He played the role of Seth Grayson on the Netflix series House of Cards, starred in the short-lived series Push, Nevada and The Beat, and made several appearances in the series Pasadena and Banshee.

He is also in the Showtime series Black Monday as Detective Lester.

== Early life ==
Cecil was born in Amarillo, Texas. He graduated from the University of Houston and the American Conservatory Theater. He graduated from William H. Taft High School in San Antonio, Texas.

== Filmography ==
=== Film ===
| Year | Title | Role | Notes |
|---|---|---|---|
| 2000 | Little Pieces | Mall Security | |
| 2002 | Men in Black II | Repairman Agent | |
| 2003 | Pretend | Sophie's Lover | |
| 2004 | Mall Cop | Frank | |
| 2005 | That Night | Thomas | Short film |
| 2007 | The Killing Floor | Garret Rankin | |
| 2009 | Frank the Rat | Billy | |
| 2009 | Reunion | Stanley | |
| 2009 | Winter of Frozen Dreams | District Attorney | |
| 2010 | The Next Three Days | Dr. Becsey | |
| 2011 | Friends with Kids | Pete | |
| 2013 | Mutual Friends | Cody | |
| 2013 | Parker | Assistant to Mrs. Fritz | |
| 2018 | Family Games | Barrett | |
| 2019 | The Tomorrow Man | Brian | |
| 2022 | The Listener | (voice) | |

=== Television ===
| Year | Title | Role | Notes |
|---|---|---|---|
| 1995 | The Unspoken Truth | Jeff Blogert | Television film |
| 1998 | Nash Bridges | Bruce Sutcliffe | Episode: "Cuda Grace" |
| 2000 | The Beat | Mike Dorigan | 13 episodes |
| 2000 | Law & Order: Special Victims Unit | Russell Ramsay | Episode: "Taken" |
| 2001 | The $treet | Duncan | 2 episodes |
| 2001 | The Back Page | | Television film |
| 2001–02 | Pasadena | Tom Bellow | 11 episodes |
| 2002 | Push, Nevada | James A. Prufrock | 8 episodes |
| 2005 | Law & Order | Steven Lamar | Episode: "Age of Innocence" |
| 2006 | Masters of Horror | Ernst Haeckel | Episode: "Haeckel's Tale" |
| 2007 | Gossip Girl | Alex | Episode: "Roman Holiday" |
| 2008 | Puppy Love | Malik | Unsold TV pilot |
| 2008 | Fringe | Christopher | Episode: "The Same Old Story" |
| 2008 | Law & Order | Joe Hartwig | Episode: "Zero" |
| 2008 | Recount | Jeremy Bash | Television film |
| 2009 | The Good Wife | Jonathan Eldredge | Episode: "Crash" |
| 2009 | Mercy | Kevin | Episode: "Pulling the Goalie" |
| 2010 | Grey's Anatomy | Sean Allen | Episode: "Suicide Is Painless" |
| 2010 | Law & Order: Criminal Intent | Ted Stoddard | Episode: "Abel & Willing" |
| 2011 | Unforgettable | Adam Coyer | Episode: "Golden Bord" |
| 2011 | Too Big To Fail | Young AIG Executive | Television film |
| 2011–12 | Treme | Chas | 7 episodes |
| 2013 | Zero Hour | Eddie | Episode: "Escapement" |
| 2013–14 | Banshee | Dean Xavier | 6 episodes |
| 2014–18 | House of Cards | Seth Grayson | 50 episodes Nominated—Screen Actors Guild Award for Outstanding Performance by an Ensemble in a Drama Series (2015–16) |
| 2019 | Law & Order: Special Victims Unit | Garrett Howard | Episode: "The Good Girl" |
| 2020 | The Outsider | Andy Katcavage | Recurring role |
| 2022 | The First Lady | Donald Rumsfeld | 5 episodes |
| 2023 | Tom Clancy's Jack Ryan | Senator Henshaw | 4 episodes |
| 2023 | Lessons in Chemistry | Dr. Robert Donatti | 5 episodes |
| 2026 | The Pitt | Michael Williams | Upcoming series |
