= Long Distance (2024 film) =

Film by Josh Gordon and Will Speck

- Promotional release poster
- Directed by: Josh Gordon; Will Speck
- Written by: Spenser Cohen
- Produced by: Brian Kavanaugh-Jones; Fred Berger; Anna Halberg
- Starring: Anthony Ramos; Naomi Scott; Kristofer Hivju; Zachary Quinto
- Cinematography: Jeff Cutter
- Edited by: Gregory Plotkin
- Music by: Steven Price
- Production companies: DreamWorks Pictures; Reliance Entertainment; Automatik
- Distributed by: Universal Pictures
- Release dates: July 12, 2024 (Vietnam); July 3, 2025 (United States)
- Running time: 87 minutes
- Country: United States
- Language: English

Long Distance is a 2024 American science fiction adventure film directed by Josh Gordon and Will Speck, and written by Spenser Cohen. The film stars Anthony Ramos, Naomi Scott, Kristofer Hivju, and Zachary Quinto. Filming took place between September and November 2020.

Originally scheduled to be released theatrically as Distant on March 11, 2022, by Universal Pictures, Long Distance was delayed several times before it was theatrically released in Vietnam on July 12, 2024. It was released on Hulu in the United States on July 3, 2025.

== Plot ==
After the mining vessel Borealis is struck by an asteroid, asteroid miner Andy Ramirez wakes from cryogenic sleep only to experience emergency evacuation procedures. With his escape pod, and most others, hurtling toward a barren, alien planet, Andy lands largely unscathed, but soon begins to realize he's the only survivor. Accompanied by his suit's outdated AI assistant LEONARD, he scrambles to patch an oxygen breach from his suit, though his oxygen tank is already critically depleted.

As Andy treks through the harsh landscape, he encounters Dwayne, a fellow survivor broadcasting a distress signal. Dwayne reveals that a rescue might take up to two years to arrive. Their brief interaction ends when Dwayne is suddenly snatched away by spider-like creatures while Andy isn't looking. Assuming Dwayne has left him for dead, Andy continues his journey to the crashed-remains of the Borealis.

Soon after, Andy intercepts a distress broadcast from Naomi Calloway, trapped in an escape pod about 10 km away with a pinned leg. LEONARD, calculating the risk of reaching Naomi, advises Andy that the journey will consume a significant portion of his already-low oxygen. Andy presses on, driven by the hope of survival and connection with who he believes to be the only other survivor. The journey is filled with peril as Andy must evade numerous alien threats such as the spider-like predators and other bizarre creatures.

Through radio exchanges, Andy reveals his personal trauma of losing his wife and son in a car accident while Naomi shares her own emotional struggles. Eventually, Andy reaches Naomi's pod and helps free her while she shares her oxygen with him. Together they fight off a creature attack to access the damaged Borealis. After closing the door, they realize they are not alone when a larger spider-like creature emerges from the dark and begins to pursue them. Accidentally locking themselves in an airlock, the spider-like creature begins to break through the door when Naomi finds a pouch of dangerous fireflies on Andy's backpack. She throws it at the creature, which frightens it away, giving them some time to run and find another door to the storage bay. When the creature follows them into the cargo bay, Naomi distracts it long enough for Andy to drop an escape pod onto it, crushing it.

Although they cannot be rescued immediately, the pair find enough supplies for them to settle in and face a potential 18-month wait, but now with hope, companionship, and a sense of emotional connection.

== Cast ==
- Anthony Ramos as Andy Ramirez
- Naomi Scott as Naomi Calloway
- Kristofer Hivju as Dwayne
- Zachary Quinto as the voice of L.E.O.N.A.R.D., Andy's AI survival suit

== Production ==
On February 21, 2019, Amblin Partners announced it had bought Spenser Cohen's spec script Distant. In August 2019, Josh Gordon and Will Speck came on board as directors, with Brian Kavanaugh-Jones, Fred Berger, and Anna Halberg attached as producers. In December 2019, Anthony Ramos joined the cast. Rachel Brosnahan was cast in February 2020 with principal photography intending to start by March 2020 but was later pushed due to the COVID-19 pandemic. and Brosnahan later dropped out due to scheduling conflicts; Naomi Scott replaced her in August 2020. Filming began in Budapest, Hungary, on September 21, 2020. As a result of the COVID-19 pandemic, the cast and crew followed safety protocols such as "extensive sanitization" procedures, wearing face masks, and social distancing. Filming concluded on November 13, 2020. By May 2021, the film was still in post-production. Steven Price composed the score and Gregory Plotkin edited the film, while Moving Picture Company provided visual effects.

== Release ==
The film was scheduled for theatrical release by Universal Pictures on March 11, 2022. In November 2021, it got delayed to September 16, 2022, later January 27, 2023 in June 2022. At one point, Amblin's website listed it for January 19, 2024, but in November 2023, it removed it from its schedule. The film, with the final title Long Distance, first premiered in Vietnam, released by CJ Entertainment on July 12, 2024. The film became available in the United States on streaming service Hulu on July 3, 2025.
