= Prospect (film) =

2018 film by Zeek Earl and Chris Caldwell

- Theatrical release poster
- Directed by: Zeek Earl; Chris Caldwell
- Written by: Zeek Earl; Chris Caldwell
- Produced by: Andrew Miano; Chris Weitz; Scott Glassgold; Dan Balgoyen; Garrick Dion; Matthias Mellinghaus
- Starring: Pedro Pascal; Sophie Thatcher; Jay Duplass
- Cinematography: Zeek Earl
- Edited by: Paul Frank
- Music by: Daniel L.K. Caldwell
- Production companies: Depth of Field; Ground Control; Bron Studios; Shep Films
- Distributed by: Dust (Gunpowder & Sky)
- Release date: March 10, 2018 (South by Southwest)
- Running time: 100 minutes
- Country: United States
- Language: English
- Budget: <$4 million
- Box office: $22,777

Prospect is a 2018 American western sci fi film written and the feature directorial debut of Zeek Earl and Chris Caldwell who also co-wrote it. It stars Sophie Thatcher in her feature-film debut, alongside Pedro Pascal and Jay Duplass. The film follows a teenage girl and her father who travel to a toxic forest moon to prospect for valuable gems, where an encounter with rival prospectors leaves her dependent on a dangerous stranger for survival.

The film was expanded from Earl's and Caldwell's 2014 short film of the same name. Produced on a budget of less than $4 million, Prospect was filmed in Washington state and made extensive use of practical sets, props and costumes to create its retrofuturistic setting. It premiered at the South by Southwest Film Festival on March 10, 2018. Gunpowder & Sky, through its science-fiction label Dust, released the film theatrically in the United States on November 2, 2018. The film was released on DVD and Blu-ray on March 5, 2019, followed by a video on demand release on March 8.

The film received generally favourable reviews, with critics particularly praising its world-building, production design and performances.

== Plot ==
Teenager Cee and her father, Damon, descend in a landing pod from a transport spaceship to the surface of a forest moon with an atmosphere covered in toxic spores. They are prospectors seeking valuable gems produced by living organisms. While travelling to a dig-site known as the queen's lair, Damon is held at gunpoint, by two rival prospectors, Ezra and his silent companion who are intent on robbing him. Damon instead proposes that they join forces and take the entire dig site from the mercenaries he originally agreed to assist.

Ezra agrees, but Cee, who has been hiding nearby, ambushes the pair with a rifle - allowing Damon to disarm Ezra before taking both men hostage. Damon attempts to rob them, but Ezra's companion attacks him and the pair shoot each other. Ezra's partner is killed and Damon is mortally wounded.

Cee flees back to their damaged lander, which fails to start. Ezra finds her several hours later and Cee shoots him in the arm before she takes him prisoner. Ezra then proposes that they follow Damon's original plan and aid the mercenaries in exchange for passage on their ship. Cee reluctantly agrees.

Ezra's wound becomes infected and the pair approaches a group of human villagers with the intent to trade for medical treatment. The villagers instead offer a trade of gems in exchange for Cee. As Ezra negotiates, Cee flees the village.

After travelling alone for some time alone, Cee encounters Ezra once again. She asks whether he would have traded her to the villagers but he denies having intended to do so. Having been refused treatment his infection worsened and he asks Cee to help him amputate his arm.

The pair continue to the mercenary camp at the Queen's Lair and negotiate passage on the mercenaries' ship in exchange for helping extract the gems. After several failed extraction attempts a fight ensues. Most of the mercenaries are killed, and Ezra is gravely wounded. Cee tends to Ezra's wound, and the pair escape into orbit on the mercenaries' ship.

== Cast ==
- Sophie Thatcher as Cee
- Jay Duplass as Damon
- Pedro Pascal as Ezra
- Luke Pitzrick as Ezra's companion, Number Two
- Arthur Deranleau as Fahr
- Andre Royo as Oruf
- Alex McCauley as Bahr
- Doug Dawson as Heshir
- Krista Johnson as Gali
- Brian Gunter as Mesur
- Sheila Vand as Inumon
- Anwan Glover as Mikken
- Trick Danneker as Jack
- Christopher Morson as Zed
- Ben Little as a Prisoner
- Shepheard Earl as a Conductor

== Production ==
Zeek Earl and Chris Caldwell met at the Seattle Pacific University. They formed the production company Shep Films and initially made commercials before making short films. They first produced Prospect as a short film, with a $21,000 budget which they raised through Kickstarter. The short drew attention after premiering at the 2014 SXSW Film Festival, ultimately becoming a hit on Vimeo.

After the short film's success, Earl and Caldwell spent several years seeking financing for a feature-length version of Prospect. They eventually secured backing from Bron Studios; Earl later said that the film's final budget was under $4 million.

They wanted seven months to make the film's ships, costumes, and weapons. For that they moved into a former ship-building warehouse in Fremont, Seattle. "We hired a lot of people who'd never worked on a movie before: industrial designers, carpenters, mechanics, cosplayers," said Caldwell. "They were working with us as the script was being written, and by the time we got the green light, we had this kind of art collective under one roof." The production team used a Computer Numeric Control (CNC) kit to create much of the ship's interiors. The filmmakers also created some of the film's environmental effects themselves. To produce the particles of poisonous dust visible in the forest scenes, Earl filmed dust being thrown through the air in the basement of his home and composited the footage into the finished film.

All of Prospect's exterior shots were filmed on a private land trust adjacent to the Olympic National Park, Washington.

== Soundtrack ==
- Crying in the Storm, written by Yasutoshi Nakajima and Reiko Yukawa, performed by Rita Chao and the Quests
- Cham Dop Khae Teart (Wait Ten Months More) (1971), written and performed by Ros Serey Sothea
- Freedom (1971), written by J.A. Seazer and Shuji Terayama, performed by Tenjo Sajiki and Tokyo Kid Brothers
- Dūdieviņš (1972), written by Imants Kalniņš, performed by Ilona Bāliņa
- Pasaulīte (1984), written by Raimonds Pauls, performed by Žoržs Siksna

== Release ==
Prospect had its world premiere on March 10, 2018, in the Visions section of the South by Southwest Film Festival. At the festival, Earl and Caldwell received the Adam Yauch Hörnblowér Award. The company Gunpowder and Sky, under their label Dust, released the film in Regal Cinemas theaters on November 2, 2018. The film was released on video on demand on March 8, 2019.

== Critical reception ==
On the review aggregator website Rotten Tomatoes, 89% of 54 critics' reviews are positive. The website's consensus reads: "Fueled by character development and setting instead of special effects, Prospect is a sci-fi story whose style is defined—and enriched—by its limitations." Metacritic, which uses a weighted average, assigned the film a score of 68 out of 100 based on eight critics, indicating "generally favorable" reviews.

Critics frequently singled out the film's production design and world-building. Noel Murray of the Los Angeles Times described it as a thoughtful science-fiction film whose Western influences were difficult to avoid, praising the filmmakers' use of practical locations and limited resources to create a convincing alien environment. Matthew Monagle of The Austin Chronicle similarly praised its production design and combination of retrofuturistic science fiction with a Western narrative.

Sophie Thatcher's performance also received praise. Bryan Bishop of The Verge considered her performance central to the film's success, highlighting the combination of determination and youthful naïveté she brought to Cee. Nick Allen of RogerEbert.com gave the film three out of four stars and praised its tactile world-building, costumes and invented language, although he regarded Cee's character development as comparatively limited.

Other reviews were more mixed. Peter Debruge of Variety praised Earl and Caldwell's aptitude for world-building while criticizing their characterization. Brian Tallerico of RogerEbert.com admired the film's ambition but found that its aesthetic and presentation prevented its various elements from fully cohering.
