= Bijlsma =

Bijlsma is a hybrid Dutch-Frisian metonymic originally meaning "axe man". Documented origins involve a carpenter and butcher. People with this surname, often spelled Bylsma abroad, include:

- Anner Bijlsma (1934–2019), Dutch cellist
- Carine Bijlsma (born 1983), Dutch documentary film maker and photographer
- Gerrit Bijlsma (1929–2004), Dutch Olympic water polo player
- Johannes Bijlsma, Dutch philosopher

== See also ==
- Bylsma, a spelling more common outside of the Netherlands
