= Anchorman (film series) =

Series of American comedy films

- Directed by: Adam McKay (1–3); Will Ferrell (Podcast)
- Written by: Will Ferrell; Adam McKay (1–3); Jake Fogelnest (Podcast)
- Produced by: Judd Apatow (1–3); Will Ferrell; Adam McKay (1–3); Carolina Barlow (Podcast); Mike Farah (Podcast); Miles Gray (Podcast); Whitney Hodack (Podcast); Jack O'Brien (Podcast); Nick Stumpf (Podcast); Colin MacDougall (Podcast)
- Starring: Will Ferrell; Christina Applegate; Paul Rudd; Steve Carell; David Koechner; Fred Willard; Carolina Barlow (Podcast)
- Music by: Alex Wurman (1, 1½); Andrew Feltenstein (2); John Nau (2)
- Production companies: Apatow Productions (1–2); Gary Sanchez Productions (2); Big Money Players (Podcast)
- Distributed by: DreamWorks Pictures (1–1½); Paramount Pictures (2) iHeartRadio (Podcast)
- Release dates: July 9, 2004 (1); December 28, 2004 (1½); December 18, 2013 (2)
- Running time: 1: 94 minutes 1½: 93 minutes 2: 119 minutes Podcast:1636 minutes
- Country: United States
- Language: English
- Budget: $76,000,000
- Box office: $264.2 million +

The Anchorman series is a media franchise initially constituting three American comedy films – Anchorman: The Legend of Ron Burgundy, Wake Up, Ron Burgundy: The Lost Movie (both 2004), and Anchorman 2: The Legend Continues (2013). The films were produced by Judd Apatow, directed by Adam McKay, and written by McKay and Will Ferrell. The films star Ferrell, Paul Rudd, David Koechner, Steve Carell, and Christina Applegate, as Ron Burgundy, Brian Fantana, Champ Kind, Brick Tamland, and Veronica Corningstone, respectively. The films were distributed by DreamWorks Pictures and Paramount Pictures. A podcast series, The Ron Burgundy Podcast, produced by Big Money Players and written by Jake Fogelnest, with Ferrell reprising his role alongside Carolina Barlow, aired for 57 episodes across four seasons on iHeartRadio from February 7, 2019 to August 19, 2021, with a fifth season in active development.

== Film series ==
=== Anchorman: The Legend of Ron Burgundy (2004) ===
Ron Burgundy is San Diego’s leading news anchor in the male-dominated world of 1970s broadcasting. However, his comfortable reign is about to be challenged when an ambitious female journalist joins the team as a new anchor, turning the newsroom upside down.The film grossed $85.3 million in North America, and $5.3 million in other countries, for a worldwide total of $90.6 million. It received generally positive reviews from critics. Rotten Tomatoes gives the film a score of 66% based on 201 reviews, with an average rating of 6.3/10. The site's consensus reads: "Filled with inspired silliness and quotable lines, Anchorman isn't the most consistent comedy in the world, but Will Ferrell's buffoonish central performance helps keep this portrait of a clueless newsman from going off the rails." Metacritic gave the film a score of 63 out of 100 based on 38 reviews.

=== Wake Up, Ron Burgundy: The Lost Movie (2004) ===
Set during Anchorman: The Legend of Ron Burgundy, Anchorman: Wake Up, Ron Burgundy: The Lost Movie follows the KVWN Channel 4 News team as they investigate the extremist bank-robbing organization "The Alarm Clock".

Unlike the other films in the Anchorman series, Wake Up, Ron Burgundy was released straight-to-video bundled with the home video release of Anchorman: The Legend of Ron Burgundy. Wake Up, Ron Burgundy is composed of outtakes from Anchorman: The Legend of Ron Burgundy.

=== Anchorman 2: The Legend Continues (2013) ===
With the 1970s behind him, San Diego's top-rated newsman, Ron Burgundy, returns to take New York's first 24-hour news channel by storm with the help of his best friends.

The film grossed $127.4 million in North America, and $45.6 million in other countries, for a worldwide total of $173.0 million. The review aggregator website Rotten Tomatoes reported a 74% approval rating with an average rating of 6.4/10 based on 199 reviews. The website's consensus reads, "It's just as uneven and loosely structured as the first Anchorman – and while Anchorman 2: The Legend Continues may not be quite as quotable, it's nearly as funny as its predecessor." On Metacritic, it holds a score of 61 out of 100 based on 40 reviews, indicating "generally favorable reviews".

== The Ron Burgundy Podcast (2019–2022) ==
In January 2019, Ferrell announced The Ron Burgundy Podcast with iHeartRadio, written by Jake Fogelnest, to launch the following month, reprising his role weekly to discuss a variety of topics and conduct interviews, lasting 68 episodes across five seasons from February 7, 2019 to August 4, 2022. The fifth season, premiering June 16, 2022, was recorded live on tour, under the conceit that Ron had burned down the sound studio in an incident involving lit candles and a kangaroo. On August 8, 2019, Ferrell, as Burgundy, appeared on the late-night talk shows Conan, The Late Show with Stephen Colbert, The Late Late Show with James Corden, The Tonight Show Starring Jimmy Fallon, Late Night with Seth Meyers, and Jimmy Kimmel Live!, all on the same night. The appearances were part of an effort to promote his "comedy routine" and the second season of The Ron Burgundy Podcast.

== Cast and characters ==
Role	Films			The Ron Burgundy Podcast				
Role	Anchorman: The Legend of Ron Burgundy	Anchorman: Wake Up, Ron Burgundy: The Lost Movie	Anchorman 2: The Legend Continues	Season 1	Season 2	Season 3	Season 4	Season 5
Role	2004		2013	2019		2020	2021	2022
Ron Burgundy	Will Ferrell	Will Ferrell	Will Ferrell	Will Ferrell	Will Ferrell	Will Ferrell	Will Ferrell	Will Ferrell
Brian Fantana	Paul Rudd	Paul Rudd	Paul Rudd					
Brick Tamland	Steve Carell	Steve Carell	Steve Carell					
Champion "Champ" Kind	David Koechner	David Koechner	David Koechner					
Veronica Corningstone	Christina Applegate	Christina Applegate	Christina Applegate					
Edward "Ed" Harken	Fred Willard	Fred Willard	Fred Willard					
Garth Holliday	Chris Parnell	Chris Parnell	Chris Parnell					
Wes Mantooth	Vince Vaughn	Vince Vaughn	Vince Vaughn					
Tino	Fred Armisen	Fred Armisen						
Scotty	Seth Rogen	Seth Rogen						
Mouse		Tara Subkoff						
Kanshasha X		Maya Rudolph						
Malcolm Y		Chuck D						
Paul Hauser		Kevin Corrigan						
Chris Harken		Justin Long						
Freddie Shapp			Dylan Baker					
Linda Jackson			Meagan Good					
Jack Lime			James Marsden					
Chani Lastnamé			Kristen Wiig					
Kench Allenby			Josh Lawson					
Gary			Greg Kinnear					
Walter Burgundy			Judah Nelson					
Mack Tannen			Harrison Ford					
Carolina Barlow				Herself	Herself	Herself	Herself	Herself
Deepak Chopra				Himself				
RuPaul				Himself				
Laura Michelle Powers				Herself				
Peter Dinklage				Himself				
Kamala Harris					Herself			
Doris Kearns Goodwin					Herself			
Jon Brion					Himself			
Clayton Kershaw					Himself			
Dillon Francis					Himself			
Brooke Shields					Herself			
Gloria Steinem					Herself			
Sia						Herself		
Dr. Lucy Jones						Herself		
Esther Perel						Herself		

== Crew ==
Character	Films			Podcast
Character	Anchorman: The Legend of Ron Burgundy	Anchorman: Wake Up, Ron Burgundy: The Lost Movie	Anchorman 2: The Legend Continues	The Ron Burgundy Podcast
Character	2004		2013	2019–2021
Director	Adam McKay	Adam McKay	Adam McKay	Will Ferrell
Producer	Judd Apatow	Judd Apatow	Judd Apatow; Will Ferrell; Adam McKay	Carolina Barlow, Mike Farah, Miles Gray, Whitney Hodack, Jack O'Brien, Nick Stumpf, and Colin MacDougall
Writer	Will Ferrell	Will Ferrell	Will Ferrell	Will Ferrell
Writer	Adam McKay	Adam McKay	Adam McKay	Jake Fogelnest
Composer	Alex Wurman	Alex Wurman	Andrew Feltenstein; John Nau	Will Ferrell
Cinematographer	Thomas E. Ackerman	Thomas E. Ackerman	Oliver Wood	Will Ferrell
Editor	Brent White	Brent White	Brent White; Melissa Bretherton	Will Ferrell
Production companies	Apatow Productions	Apatow Productions	Apatow Productions; Gary Sanchez Productions	Big Money Players
Distributor	DreamWorks Pictures	DreamWorks Pictures	Paramount Pictures	iHeartRadio
Running time	94 minutes	93 minutes	119 minutes	1636 minutes
Release date	July 9, 2004	December 28, 2004	December 18, 2013	February 7, 2019 – August 19, 2021

== Reception ==
=== Box office performance ===
Film	Release date	Box office revenue			Box office ranking		Budget	Reference
Film	Release date	US & Canada	Other countries	Worldwide	All time US & Canada	All time worldwide	Budget	Reference
Anchorman: The Legend of Ron Burgundy	July 9, 2004	$85,288,303	$5,285,885	$90,574,188	#718	—N/a	$26,000,000	
Anchorman 2: The Legend Continues	December 18, 2013	$127,352,707	$46,296,308	$173,649,015	#380	—N/a	$50,000,000	
Total		$212,641,010	$51,582,193	$264,223,203			$76,000,000	

=== Critical and public response ===
Film	Rotten Tomatoes	Metacritic	CinemaScore
Anchorman: The Legend of Ron Burgundy	66% (201 reviews)	63 (38 reviews)	B
Anchorman: Wake Up, Ron Burgundy: The Lost Movie	—N/a (1 review)	—N/a	
Anchorman 2: The Legend Continues	74% (199 reviews)	61 (40 reviews)	B

== Future ==
On November 13, 2013, Will Ferrell spoke about the possibility of a third main Anchorman film stating: "I'm sure they would, but I don't know. We just want to see what happens with this one and we'll sit down and assess all of that. Right now, we're just enjoying this journey." On December 9, 2013, Steve Carell said "We'll see how this one goes," and "If people like it, maybe 10 years from now we'll do a third."

Director Adam McKay spoke to Empire in February 2014, and ruled out any further Anchorman movies, saying "It's done. I think that's it. It was great to do it and it was so fun to work with those guys again, but I think that's it for Ron Burgundy." When asked if he would do sequels with any character, he said "No, that's the last sequel we're gonna do. There's nothing more fun to me than new characters and a new world. And now we're releasing this alt version, we're totally satisfied. No Anchorman 3."

However, on April 2, 2014, Adam McKay stated that Anchorman 3 could still be a possibility, which went against his previous statement. In an interview with Time, he stated "I said about a month ago that we'd never do a third one, and I realized that was a little too harsh because the truth is, I really don't know. With these movies, you really don't know how they've played until about two years after they come out, when people see them on repeat viewing." He then also went on to state that "If Anchorman 2 gets that sort of second life, if three, four years from now people start asking us that question a lot and there's an idea, we would be open to that."

In 2018, McKay offered an idea of sending Ron Burgundy to cover the first or second Iraq War. In an interview with CinemaBlend, McKay said "I don't know if you remember the first and even the second Iraq war. Maybe it was mainly the second Iraq war. They embedded journalists and that gave us kind of a whole story idea. I don't want to say too much, but I'll just tell you that embedded journalist, Ron Burgundy, Veronica Corningstone, the news team. That definitely gave us a big idea." In that same year, Steve Carell stated he would reprise his role of Brick Tamland if a third film was made.

== Appearances in other media ==
- On March 28, 2012, Will Ferrell officially announced Anchorman 2: The Legend Continues dressed in character as Ron Burgundy on the late-night talk show Conan. Ferrell would eventually appear again as Burgundy in an interview on Conan to promote the sequel.
- On November 30, 2013, Ferrell co-anchored a newscast on Bismarck, North Dakota's CBS affiliate KXMB-TV in character as Ron Burgundy. The next day, he made a guest appearance on TSN's coverage of the Canadian Olympic Curling Trials from Winnipeg, Manitoba.
- In 2013, Crown Publishing Group published Let Me Off at the Top!: My Classy Life and Other Musings, an 'autobiography' of Ron Burgundy written by Will Ferrell. In November 2013, Ferrell, in character as Burgundy, held a book signing for the biography.
- Also in 2013, to promote Anchorman 2's release, Ferrell appeared as Burgundy in a series of Dodge commercials.
- In December 2013, Ferrell was set to host the evening edition of SportsCenter, but the appearance was canceled in the wake of a press conference involving sexual assault allegations against college football quarterback Jameis Winston.
- On December 19, 2013, Ferrell appeared on Jimmy Kimmel Live! and performed "Ride Like the Wind" in character as Ron Burgundy with Christopher Cross.
- Ferrell appeared in character as Ron Burgundy at the Comedy Central Roast of Justin Bieber in 2015.
- On March 21, 2019, Ferrell, as Burgundy, took part in Fox Sports West's coverage of that night's Los Angeles Kings game. Ferrell called the second period of the Kings' 4–2 win over the San Jose Sharks.
- On May 5, 2024, Ferrell, appeared in character as Ron Burgundy at The Roast of Tom Brady on Netflix.
- Ron Burgundy was the special guest in a 2026 May episode of "Wait wait don't tell me".
