= Step Brothers (film) =

2008 American comedy film by Adam McKay

- Theatrical release poster
- Directed by: Adam McKay
- Screenplay by: Will Ferrell; Adam McKay
- Story by: Will Ferrell; Adam McKay; John C. Reilly
- Produced by: Jimmy Miller; Judd Apatow
- Starring: Will Ferrell; John C. Reilly; Richard Jenkins; Mary Steenburgen; Adam Scott; Kathryn Hahn
- Cinematography: Oliver Wood
- Edited by: Brent White
- Music by: Jon Brion
- Production companies: Columbia Pictures; Relativity Media; The Apatow Company; Mosaic Media Group; Gary Sanchez Productions
- Distributed by: Sony Pictures Releasing
- Release date: July 25, 2008
- Running time: 98 minutes
- Country: United States
- Language: English
- Budget: $65 million
- Box office: $128 million

Step Brothers is a 2008 American comedy film directed by Adam McKay, produced by Jimmy Miller and Judd Apatow, and written by Will Ferrell and McKay from a story by Ferrell, McKay, and John C. Reilly. Ferrell and Reilly star as Brennan Huff and Dale Doback, immature middle-aged men who still live with their single parents and are forced to share a home after their parents marry. Richard Jenkins, Mary Steenburgen, Adam Scott, and Kathryn Hahn are in supporting roles.

Developed from a single bunk-bed gag image into a premise about adult arrested development, the film was conceived by McKay and Ferrell as a comparatively contained, house-centered production that could be driven by ensemble improvisation. That approach shaped writing and casting, and filming began in the summer of 2007, including work on soundstages at Sony Pictures Studios in Culver City, California, where long takes and risk-taking generated extensive footage for the edit. The score, composed by Jon Brion, was designed around a stylized contrast, blending orchestral and rock textures while also drawing on improvisation during recording.

Released on July 25, 2008, by Sony Pictures Releasing, Step Brothers opened in second place in the U.S. and Canada and grossed $128 million worldwide against a $65 million budget. Reviews were mixed, with some critics praising the film's comic abandon and commitment to absurdity and others dismissing it as an excessive, abrasive, or simply unfunny variation on familiar Ferrell–Reilly dynamics.

The film has been widely reappraised, with later retrospectives noting that repeat viewings helped cement its popularity and contributed to a reputation as a cult favorite. The film's long-term reception and legacy have also included appearances in later rankings and polls of the best comedy films of all time, and it inspired the real-world Catalina Wine Mixer, launched in 2015 as an annual event at Catalina Island. Discussion of a possible sequel has recurred, but no follow-up has been confirmed, and the dissolution of the Ferrell–McKay business partnership at Gary Sanchez Productions in 2019 has been cited as a potential complication for future collaboration.

== Plot ==
39-year-old Brennan Huff and 40-year-old Dale Doback are immature adults who still live with their respective single parents. Brennan's divorced mother, Nancy, meets Dale's widowed father, Robert, and they marry, forcing Brennan and Dale to grudgingly live together as stepbrothers. Since Dale refuses to give up his office drum set, they are forced to share a bedroom. Despite Dale's warnings, Brennan touches Dale's drum set and a fight breaks out. Nancy and Robert suspend their television privileges for a week and demand that they find jobs or face eviction.

Brennan's arrogant younger brother, Derek, a helicopter leasing agent, visits with his family and humiliates Brennan and Dale. Dale punches Derek, which leads Brennan to reassess Dale, and for Derek's frustrated wife, Alice, to become attracted to Dale and they begin a secret affair. Brennan and Dale bond over their shared interests, particularly music. Nancy reveals that Brennan had stopped singing after Derek and his friends taunted him during a school musical. Robert arranges job interviews for Brennan and Dale, but they perform poorly and are attacked on their way home by juvenile bullies. Robert and Nancy then announce plans to sell the house with Derek's help, retire, and travel on Robert's sailboat. They also enroll Brennan and Dale in therapy and set aside money for deposits on separate apartments. Brennan becomes infatuated with his therapist, Denise, but she maintains professional boundaries.

At Derek's birthday party, Brennan and Dale show a promotional video for their proposed entertainment business, "Prestige Worldwide". The promo includes a music video they filmed on Robert's boat without his permission that ends with the boat crashing. With their plans to sail the world dashed, Robert and Nancy's marriage becomes strained, and at Christmas they announce their divorce. Brennan and Dale argue, blame each other, and move out separately. While living independently, each becomes more functional and productive.

Brennan asks Derek for a job at the helicopter leasing company, and later insists on running a major client event, the Catalina Wine Mixer. He hires the catering company where Dale works, reconciles with him, and invites Robert and Nancy to attend. During the event, the hired Billy Joel cover band quits after the lead singer overreacts to a heckler. Derek holds Brennan responsible and fires him. Robert, realizing that his rigid demands for Brennan and Dale to mature have stifled them, urges them to perform. They take the stage and Brennan sings "Por ti volaré" while Dale plays drums. Their moving performance prompts Robert and Nancy to reunite, improves Brennan's relationship with Derek, and triggers Denise's romantic interest in Brennan. Dale ends his affair with Alice.

Six months later, Robert and Nancy have remarried and returned to the house, while Brennan and Dale operate Prestige Worldwide as a small entertainment business providing karaoke services. Robert has turned his boat into a tree house stocked with props as a Christmas gift for Brennan and Dale. In a mid-credits scene, Brennan and Dale retaliate against the bullies.

== Cast ==
- Will Ferrell as Brennan Huff, the 39-year-old layabout son of Nancy. Bryce Hurless plays Brennan's young self.
- John C. Reilly as Dale Doback, the 40-year-old layabout son of Robert
- Richard Jenkins as Dr. Robert Doback, Dale's widowed father and a medical doctor
- Mary Steenburgen as Nancy Huff, Brennan's divorced mother, with whom Robert is remarried
- Adam Scott as Derek Huff, Brennan's successful but arrogant younger brother. Dmitri Schuyler-Linch plays Derek's young self
- Kathryn Hahn as Alice Huff, Derek's lonely wife who engages in a sexual affair with Dale
- Andrea Savage as Denise, Brennan's therapist and eventual love interest
- Rob Riggle as Randy, Derek's best friend who works under him at a helicopter leasing company
- Lurie Poston as Tommy Huff, Derek and Alice's oldest child and son
- Elizabeth Yozamp as Tiffany Huff, Derek and Alice's youngest child and daughter
- Logan Manus as Chris Gardocki, the juvenile leader of a group of bullies and Dale's nemesis
Brian Huskey, Seth Rogen, and Gillian Vigman all appear as employers interviewing Brennan and Dale, while Ken Jeong stars as temp employment officer.

== Production ==
=== Development ===
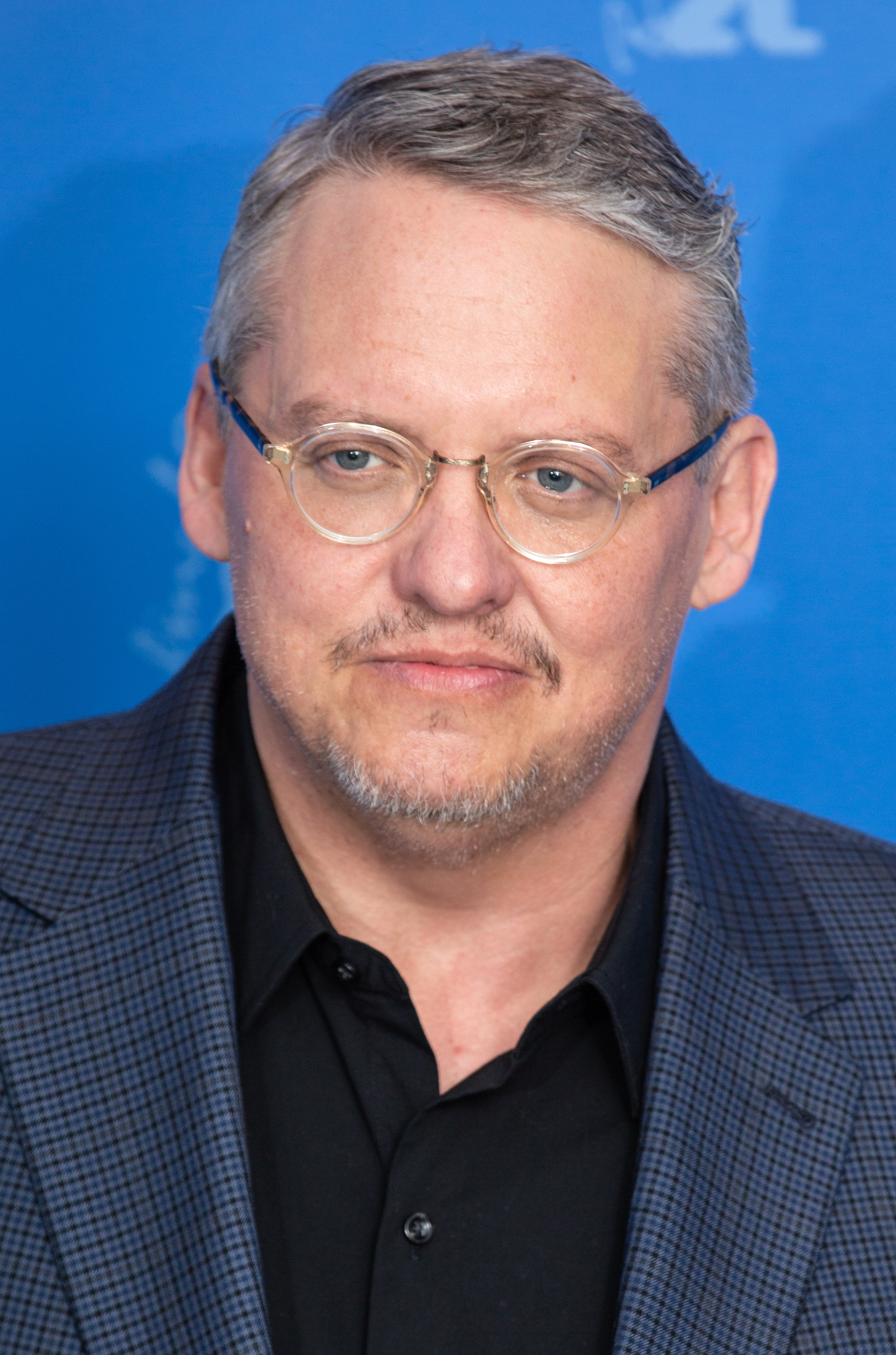
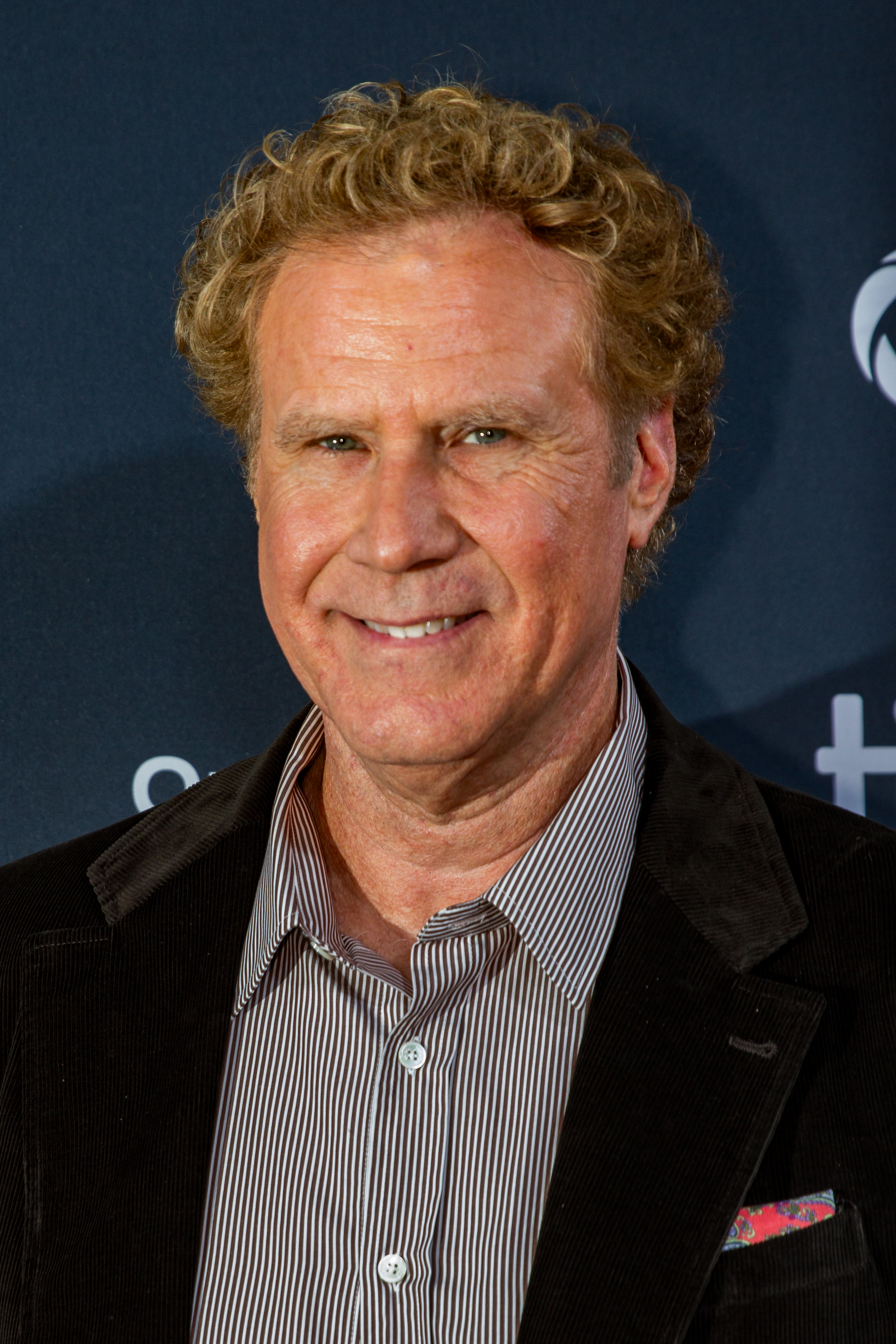
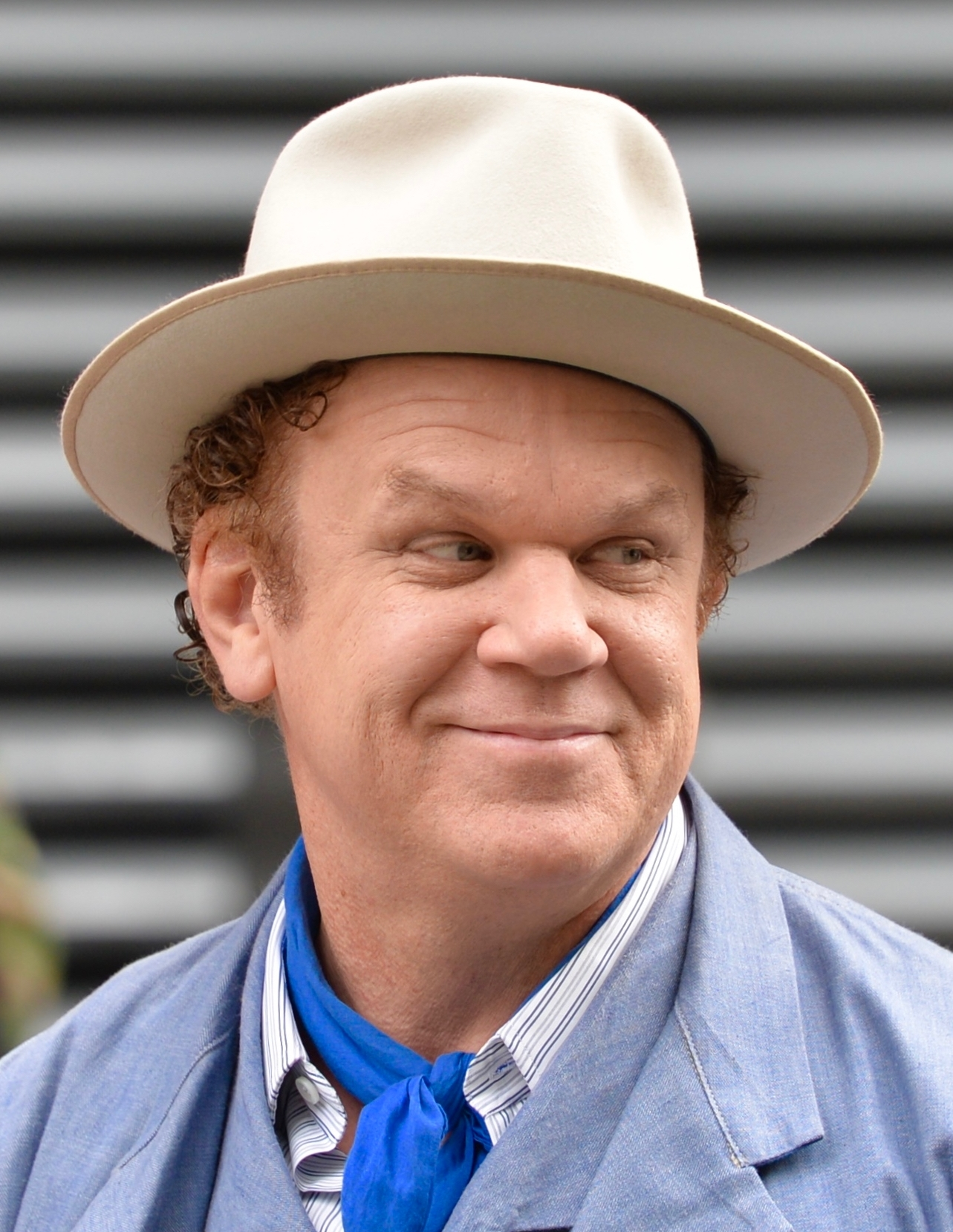
(L–R) Director Adam McKay and actors Will Ferrell and John C. Reilly, who had previously worked on Talladega Nights: The Ballad of Ricky Bobby, developed the screen story for Step Brothers.

Step Brothers marked the third feature collaboration between director Adam McKay and actor Will Ferrell, who had previously worked together on Talladega Nights: The Ballad of Ricky Bobby (2006) and Anchorman: The Legend of Ron Burgundy (2004). The concept for Step Brothers originated during post-production work on Talladega Nights, when McKay and editor Brent White recalled informal conversations with Ferrell and John C. Reilly about what to do next. McKay and White described the initial spark as a single comic image involving bunk beds, which then expanded into a broader premise about overgrown children who still live at home after their single parents marry.

McKay said he and Ferrell wanted a production that was simpler in set design than Talladega Nights and relied primarily on a house setting and a small set of locations built around improvisation by a strong ensemble. He also placed the project in a studio environment that, in his view, was receptive to comedy pitches at the time, and he said Sony Pictures purchased the film based on the pitch.

Writing was undertaken by McKay, Ferrell, and Reilly in a guest house on Ferrell's property. McKay described the early sessions as focused on generating scene ideas, images, and behavioral details drawn in part from childhood memories. Ferrell said the improvisational spirit carried into drafting, producing scenes far longer than typical and yielding an early draft of about 180 pages that later required substantial cutting. McKay also recalled that at least one longer sequence and an early storyline that explored whether the protagonists had a diagnosable problem were removed as the script was refined.

=== Pre-production ===
McKay said he warned actors that auditions and on-set work would involve improvising and testing ideas in the room, and casting director Allison Jones described this expectation as standard for his films. Mary Steenburgen joined the cast after having worked with Ferrell previously, and she recalled that he personally contacted her about portraying his character's mother. McKay and Jones described Richard Jenkins as a performer capable of playing comedy with an earnest quality rather than a self-consciously jokey style. Adam Scott recalled being cast unexpectedly and described the role as his first major step into screen comedy. Before the role went to Scott, Dax Shepard and Jon Hamm had auditioned for it, and both would later recall being upset that neither one was cast. Jones and other participants described auditions that emphasized inventiveness and comfort with improvisation, including the use of experienced comedic readers to help draw out choices. Several participants also described the table read as a strong early indicator of the ensemble's comedic chemistry.

Department heads described creative choices that reinforced the characters' immaturity. Costume designer Susan Matheson assembled extensive racks of vintage shirts with childlike designs to evoke a sense of arrested development. Property master Scott Maginnis described pushing for a realistic look to the pair of prosthetic testicles that Ferrell would rub against a drum kit because he anticipated close camera coverage. Production designer Clayton Hartley agreed that the effect needed to look convincing.

=== Filming ===
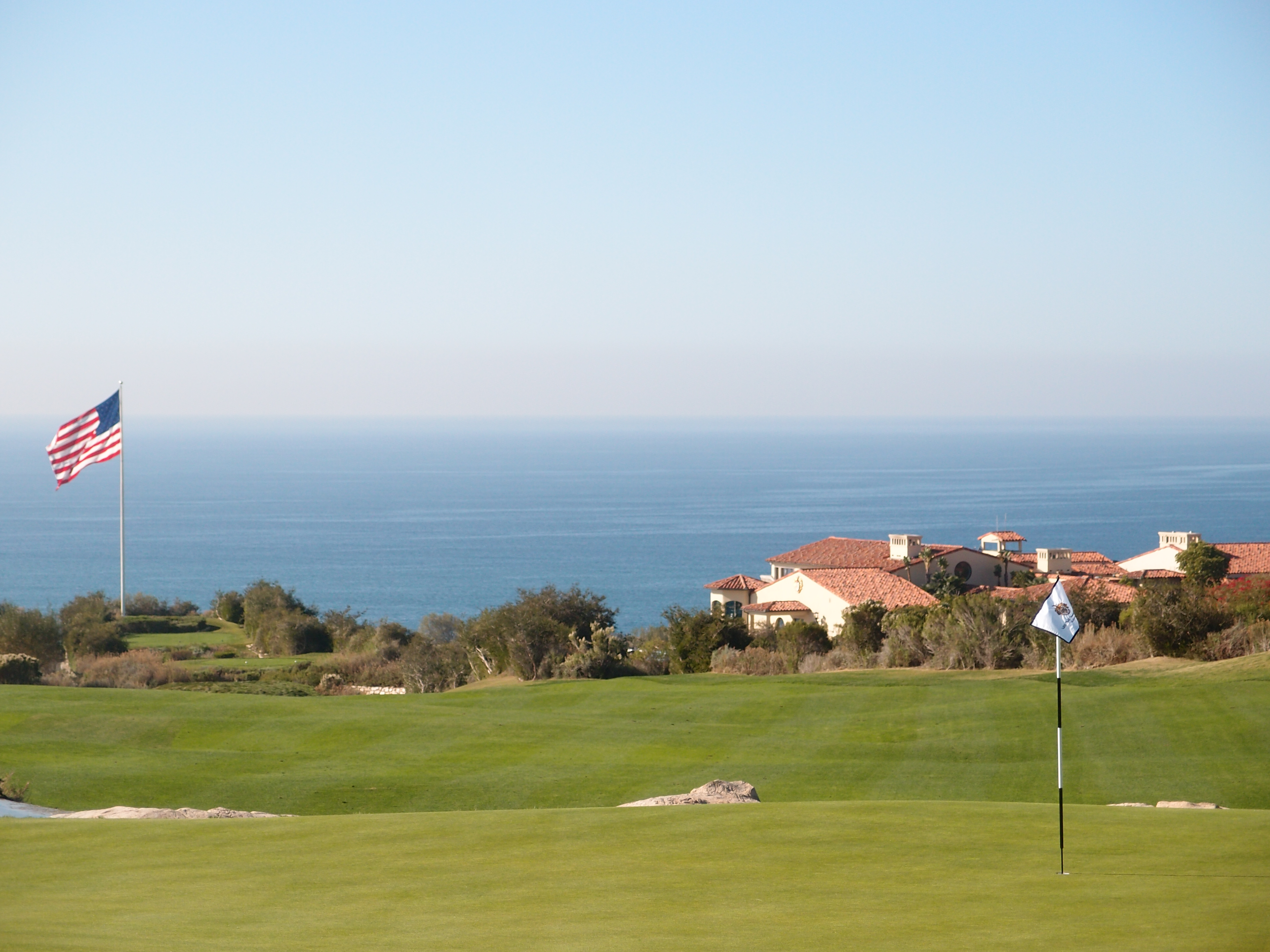
Trump National Golf Club, Los Angeles (pictured here in 2011) stood in for Catalina Island to shoot the Catalina Wine Mixer sequence.

Filming began in the summer of 2007. Parts of the shoot took place at Sony Pictures Studios' sound stages in Culver City, California, as well as Trump National Golf Club, Los Angeles, in Rancho Palos Verdes, California, which stood in for Catalina Island to film the Catalina Wine Mixer.

Participants repeatedly characterized filming as structured around improvisation, long takes, and a set culture that encouraged risk-taking. McKay described a method of explicitly permitting unsuccessful attempts to improve spontaneity. Performers and crew members described the atmosphere as supportive and playful, with Rob Riggle and Adam Scott emphasizing that the core creative team made supporting actors feel included and able to experiment. The same working style also affected the schedule and logistics. Ken Jeong described spending hours filming a very short scene. Steenburgen recalled a car scene that ran through the day without completing a full take, and Matheson described long periods of continuous rolling that delayed access to the set for urgent wardrobe needs. White said there was assembly footage that ran for hours, and McKay said the production exposed a very large amount of film stock, which reportedly measured over 1.5 million feet before editing. White recalled Kodak acknowledging the volume with a celebratory gesture during the shoot.

Jenkins was inoculated against tetanus after sustaining a puppy dog bite on his rear when shooting Ferrell and Reilly's fight sequence. He insisted that he act limp for the next scene to give his footage a sense of continuity; McKay, however, told Jenkins that his dog-bite sequence would not be used.

=== Post-production ===
Editorial decisions were shaped by the volume of material generated through extended improvisation and multiple variations. White described cutting down long alternate versions of scenes, including a more elaborate sleepwalking sequence that was removed because it was too long to fit in the finished film. Hahn and Matheson also described an awareness, during production, that the editorial team would have to shape a coherent story out of extensive footage.

White and McKay described receiving studio feedback at test screenings that the film felt unusually strange or extreme, which they interpreted as evidence that the film had reached the intended tone rather than as a reason to moderate content.

=== Music ===
==== Film score ====
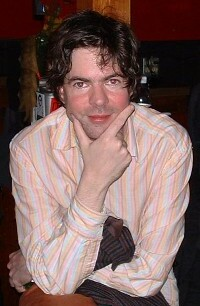
Musician Jon Brion (pictured here in 2004) composed the score for Step Brothers

The original score for Step Brothers was composed by Jon Brion and was recorded at the Hollywood Studio Symphony. It is characterized as combining orchestral throwback writing with driving rock and percussion. During editing, director Adam McKay found that Brion's existing cues worked unusually well as temporary music, which helped lead to his involvement in the project.

In the recording process, a significant portion of the material was developed through improvisation built around written riffs. Brion and McKay developed a concept that blended a sincere orchestral underscore with deliberately old-fashioned, early-1960s-inspired "Hollywood" colors, including light woodwind composition associated with classic family-film scoring. The goal was a heightened, throwback sound that could sit in comic contrast with the on-screen behavior, creating a clear stylistic juxtaposition between the film's main dramatic underscoring and more overtly nostalgic, Disney-like passages.

The score's instrumental component included distinctive string-family textures created with fretted instruments. Brion enlisted guitarist Chris Eldridge, who is associated with the Punch Brothers, and proposed an overdubbed "mandolin quartet" approach (built from mandolin, mandola, and mandocello parts) to give the underscore an identity different from a conventional comedy score.

==== Other songs ====
For Step Brothers, music was also treated as an element that needed to function both comically and credibly. McKay credited music supervisor Hal Willner with recommending live performance of "Sweet Child o' Mine" for the family car-singing sequence because looping reduced energy. Willner described aiming for a result that sounded good rather than broadly comic. McKay also described the creation of the song used for the film's music segment gag, "Boats 'n Hoes", stating that its chorus, "boats and hoes, boats and hoes" was actually sung by him and recorded over the phone during production.

== Release ==
=== Box office ===
Rotten Tomatoes projected before release that Step Brothers would open in about 2,800 locations and gross about $21 million and later suggested it could finish in the $100–110 million range domestically. The film was released on July 25, 2008, by Sony Pictures Releasing. In its opening weekend, the film debuted in second place, behind The Dark Knight, in the United States and Canada. The film played in 3,094 locations and averaged $9,696 per theater, and Sony reported that 54% of the opening-weekend audience was male and 66% was under 25. An Entertainment Weekly report described the debut as the eighth-best opening for an R-rated comedy and noted that it was "a nice rebound for Ferrell" following the poor box-office returns of Semi-Pro. In its second weekend, the film grossed an estimated $16.3 million, fell 47%, and ranked third; after 10 days, it had earned $63 million. The film ended its theatrical run grossing $100 million in the U.S. and Canada, $28 million in other territories, and $128 million worldwide.

=== Critical reception ===
Critical reception to Step Brothers was mixed upon its release, with reviews ranging from enthusiastic praise for its comic impact to blunt rejection of it as an unfunny exercise in excess. The Village Voice described moments of "unbridled comic pleasure" and treated the film as a purposeful embrace of absurdity, while an Associated Press (AP) review called the central concept the film's "fundamental, irreparable flaw" and characterizing the result as "painfully unfunny". The A.V. Club likewise framed its experience in terms of abrasive unpleasantness, describing the film in unusually harsh sensory terms and questioning its basic effectiveness as comedy.

Several critics focused on Ferrell and Reilly's performances and on whether their near sameness strengthened the comedy or left it without contrast. For detractors, the pair was so alike that the expected contrast never arrived, and the AP argued that they "are essentially playing the same person", leaving "no odd-couple tension" and little beyond competitive one-upmanship. In a similar vein, the San Francisco Chronicle review noted that the two characters were not strongly distinguished, which limited the effect of their interactions. More favorable reactions treated the near-duplication as a deliberate comic engine, with Salon.com presenting their shared immaturity and escalation as a major source of the film's humor rather than a flaw to be corrected.

Many critics framed the film's premise around arrested development, describing adult characters who behave like children and measuring the film by what it does with that regression. (Note: Attributed to multiple references:) The AP explicitly described the leads as "stuck in the same state of arrested development", linking that stasis to the film's lack of interpersonal variety. The Wall Street Journal (WSJ) similarly reduced the protagonists to "petulant, profane children" and treated that condition as a promising setup for satire. The Village Voice made the emotional standstill part of its description of the film's internal logic, observing that the characters appear to have stopped developing at about early adolescence. The A.V. Club also described the characters in childlike terms and tied their behavior to a style of comedy that aims for provocation as much as laughs.

The film's reliance on vulgarity and hostility was a central point of appraisal, with reviewers differing on whether the crudity supplied energy or simply repelled. (Note: Attributed to multiple references:) Entertainment Weekly described the film in terms that emphasized profanity and emotional harshness and treated its mean streak as a defining ingredient of its comic identity. The A.V. Club emphasized abrasive texture and foulness in its characterization, aligning the film's style with a viewer experience shaped by overload. The WSJ went further, arguing that the premise might have supported satire but that the film instead arrived at something "truly ghastly", a judgment that tied tone to an absence of the maturity satire requires. Even critics who found it funny often framed that reaction as inseparable from its crudeness, treating the humor as a test of tolerance as much as taste.

Several reviews argued that the film's comic high points were delivered as extended set pieces rather than as developments sustained by plot, a structure that some found liberating and others exhausting. (Note: Attributed to multiple references:) The Village Voice suggested that the film's plot structure resists conventional causality, treating scene-to-scene logic as secondary to how far it can push absurdity without losing the audience. For critics already dissatisfied with the basic approach, that looseness read as self-indulgence, with the AP describing a creative process of collecting adolescent gags and presenting them at feature length. USA Today also pointed to a thinning narrative foundation, noting that the plot does not provide enough shape to sustain what it called the film's extended comedic business. The A.V. Club similarly criticized the film's willingness to keep pushing material past the point of payoff, treating duration and repetition as part of the problem rather than part of the joke.

Some critics argued that the film's deliberately silly style gestures toward satire or social commentary, while others said it does not deliver on that promise. The Village Voice argued that a commentary on how adulthood is defined sits beneath the film's freely associative surface and explicitly raised the possibility that it could be read as either juvenile or probing. The Time magazine review similarly emphasized that the premise itself could be read as unsettling rather than merely silly, framing the film's impulses in terms that suggested intentional provocation. By contrast, the WSJ acknowledged satire as the natural use of the setup, then rejected the film's execution because satire depends on a baseline of maturity that the film does not supply.

== Post-release ==
=== Home media ===
Sony Pictures Home Entertainment released Step Brothers on DVD and Blu-ray on December 2, 2008, in a single-disc rated edition, a single-disc unrated edition, and a 2-disc unrated edition. In a weekly DVD sales report dated December 15, 2008, The Numbers listed the film among the top five titles for the week, reporting 1.60 million units sold and $29.38 million in sales. The film generated DVD sales of an estimated 3.87 million units, totaling $63.7 million. For the home video release, Will Ferrell, John C. Reilly, and Adam McKay recorded the commentary track with composer Jon Brion as an improvised musical.

=== Retrospective reassessment ===
On the review aggregator website Rotten Tomatoes, 54% of 200 critics' reviews are positive. The website's consensus reads: "Step Brothers indulges in a cheerfully relentless immaturity that will quickly turn off viewers unamused by Ferrell and Reilly -- and delight those who find their antics hilarious." Metacritic, which uses a weighted average, assigned the film a score of 51 out of 100, based on 33 critics, indicating "mixed or average" reviews. Audience polls by CinemaScore reported that moviegoers gave the film an average letter grade of B.

In the years since its release, Step Brothers has been the subject of a notable critical reevaluation. A 2025 retrospective at The Guardian recalled that some contemporary reviewers regarded the film as conspicuously juvenile, citing period reactions that characterized it as uncivil or unpleasant. The same article nonetheless argued that the film's exaggerated vulgarity sits alongside craft and comic control, describing it in paradoxical terms that present it as both crude and effective and as simultaneously time-bound and durable. A tenth-anniversary essay in GQ similarly treated the film as "timeless" in retrospect, despite pointing to its modest aggregate-score reputation, and positioned it as an especially strong example of its era's studio comedy. Another tenth-anniversary discussion in Entertainment Weekly described appreciation arriving after multiple repeat viewings (particularly via late-night cable) and argued that the film occupies an unusual middle ground, a mainstream hit that can still feel like a cult film to its fanbase.

Step Brothers has made rankings and polls of the best comedy films of all time, including Paste (no. 79), the BBC (no. 64), IndieWire (no. 37), SlashFilm, The Daily Telegraph (no. 16), and Rolling Stone (no. 17). Rotten Tomatoes places Step Brothers at no. 140 on its list of the 150 Essential Comedy Movies to Watch Now. In 2025, Step Brothers was one of the films voted for in The New York Times' (NYT) readers' poll of The 100 Best Movies of the 21st Century, finishing at number 205. Likewise, in the British Film Institute's 2012 Sight & Sound polls, Snowtown (2011) director Justin Kurzel named Step Brothers one of his top ten picks of the greatest films ever made. In 2016, former NYT film critic A. O. Scott called Step Brothers a "bona fide masterpiece", while Jack Hamilton at Slate magazine named it director Adam McKay's best film.

=== Cultural impact and legacy ===
Rap artist Kanye West and actors Jennifer Lawrence, Joaquin Phoenix, Ryan Gosling, Evan Peters, and Marion Cotillard consider themselves to be fans of the film. (Note: Attributed to multiple references:) West referenced lines from the film for some of his songs, while Peters credited the film with helping him unwind from playing the titular notorious serial killer in Monster: The Jeffrey Dahmer Story (2022). Cotillard said the final sequence featuring Ferrell singing "Por ti volaré" at the Catalina Wine Mixer always made her cry.

A real-world Catalina Wine Mixer did not exist until 2015, when one was established as an annual event at Catalina Island. In 2025, Adam Kinzinger, a former Republican representative of Illinois, turned an otherwise morose Christmas dinner clip from the film into an internet meme criticizing tariffs in the second Trump administration.

== Thematic analysis ==
Step Brothers builds its comedy around the tension between adult expectations and prolonged adolescence, using exaggerated behavior to point to how stressful and emotionally confining "growing up" can feel. According to Alison Foreman at Mashable, a key idea presented about the film is that it satirizes "adulting" and the pressure to prove a person is making something of themselves. Within that framing, much of the conflict comes from the contrast between Dale Doback and Brennan Huff, who cling to youthful comforts and hobbies, and their parents, who emphasize what their sons "should be doing" as adults.

Foreman identifies the film's core message as arriving in the final act, when Robert Doback realizes that his rigid expectations of Dale and Brennan to mature as adults have made them unhappy. In this account, Robert's advice, "Don't lose your dinosaur", delivered during a speech about his childhood dream of becoming a Tyrannosaurus rex, functions as a concise reminder to hold on to the "silly distractions and joys" that shape identity even while facing major life choices. Cecily Knobler in Upworthy treats the line as advice about aging, emphasizing the importance of protecting childhood creativity and leaving room for an "inner child" rather than letting it fade.

By contrast, Will Cox at The Guardian treated the central characters as an early example of a later online archetype, the so-called "large adult sons", using the pair of Ferrell and Reilly to tackle a broader cultural tolerance for overgrown male irresponsibility. In this view, the film's gross-out set pieces are treated less as ends in themselves than as part of a heightened world built to spotlight adult immaturity and entitlement.

== Future ==
Reilly said the team had discussed a follow-up to Step Brothers "pretty much since the first one came out", but argued that sequels are often less appealing to artists than to fans and emphasized that no concrete project was in development at the time. He added that the filmmakers were reluctant to proceed unless they could "improve on what it is", describing sequels as difficult to execute successfully. Ferrell separately described one concept that had been considered, in which the characters follow their parents into a retirement community and attempt to claim they, too, have earned the right to retire. Ferrell and Reilly instead re-teamed on Holmes & Watson (2018), which Ferrell and Adam McKay also produced through their company Gary Sanchez Productions. A later rift between Ferrell and McKay, who announced in 2019 that they were ending their business partnership at Gary Sanchez, has been cited as a potential complication to future collaboration on a Step Brothers sequel. While acknowledging uncertainty about a continuation, Mary Steenburgen said she continued to quote the film and would be willing to reprise her role.
