= Bylsma =

Bylsma or Bijlsma is a surname. Notable people with the surname include:

- Anner Bylsma (1934–2019), Dutch cellist
- Dan Bylsma (born 1970), former American hockey player and former head coach of the Pittsburgh Penguins
- John Bylsma (born 1948), Australian cyclist
- Jim Bylsma. (born 1954) high school football coach in Wisconsin

== See also ==
- Bijlsma, the spelling more common within the Netherlands
