= Wake Up, Ron Burgundy: The Lost Movie =

2004 film by Adam McKay

- Directed by: Adam McKay
- Written by: Will Ferrell; Adam McKay
- Produced by: Judd Apatow
- Starring: Will Ferrell; Christina Applegate; Paul Rudd; Steve Carell; David Koechner
- Cinematography: Thomas E. Ackerman
- Edited by: Brent White
- Music by: Alex Wurman
- Production company: Apatow Productions
- Distributed by: DreamWorks Home Entertainment
- Release date: December 28, 2004
- Running time: 93 minutes
- Country: United States
- Language: English

Wake Up, Ron Burgundy: The Lost Movie (also known as Anchorman: The Adventure Continues) is a 2004 American direct-to-video satirical comedy film and an alternative cut to the film Anchorman: The Legend of Ron Burgundy of the same year. Like the original film, it was directed by Adam McKay, produced by Judd Apatow, written by McKay and Will Ferrell, and stars Ferrell, Christina Applegate, David Koechner, Steve Carell, and Paul Rudd. It is composed of outtakes and scrapped storylines from the original film.

Wake Up, Ron Burgundy was released by DreamWorks Home Entertainment on December 28, 2004, bundled with the home release of Anchorman: The Legend of Ron Burgundy.

== Plot ==
In 1974, Ron Burgundy is a famous anchorman for San Diego television station KVWN channel 4. The news team includes Veronica Corningstone, KVWN's first female reporter and anchor, and his childhood friends: lead field reporter Brian Fantana, sportscaster Champion "Champ" Kind, and meteorologist Brick Tamland. One night, after the 6 o'clock newscast, they go to a big TV anchor party.

The next morning, Mouse, Kanshasha X, Malcolm Y and Paul Hauser, the terrorist group "The Alarm Clock", rob a bank. Later that day, KVWN hears of this third robbery.

The Alarm Clock members celebrate their success, the money is for "the revolution". However, they do not have a clear goal; Hauser is meant to write "the manifesto" explaining the revolution, but has yet to do it. The group criticizes him so he, in a panic, states that the group's mission is eliminating propaganda from television. This, after seeing Burgundy's public service announcement denouncing illicit drugs as an example of such propaganda. Unanimously expressing their contempt for him after watching it, taking over television broadcasts becomes their goal.

That night, Burgundy gives Corningstone a tour of San Diego. While doing so, he points out the San Diego Observatory, expressing a desire to broadcast news from there. Burgundy marvels over the number of viewers he believes such a broadcast could reach.

The next day, Corningstone reports on a cat fashion show. There Hauser, not revealing himself as a member of the Alarm Clock, introduces himself to her. He asks various questions about television broadcasting for his group. Hauser recites an Alarm Clock motto to Corningstone, then leaves.

Later, the Alarm Clock attempts to rob another bank. But the teller questions the group's masks, then refuses to give them money. When entering the bank Hauser yells the same motto he said to Corningstone at the cat show. She, after watching a closed-circuit television video of the robbery, identifies him.

Burgundy, wanting to investigate the Alarm Clock himself, gets permission from Harken to be a field reporter. He then steals the information Corningstone had gathered about Hauser. Using the address she had found, Burgundy and his news team attempt to interview Hauser. At first, he denies his involvement in the Alarm Clock, but when an alarm sounds, Hauser admits it, then runs outside and steals the team's van.

As a result, Burgundy is fired from KVWN. His reputation worsens quickly and Corningstone becomes the lead anchor. Burgundy visits his mentor Jess Moondragon, to whom he reiterates his desire to transmit news from the observatory; repeating his belief that such a broadcast would reach the masses.

Corningstone is kidnapped upon arriving home by the Alarm Clock. Wes Mantooth, lead anchor at rival KQHS channel 9 news, reports on it. It is believed the terrorist group kidnapped her to broadcast their message. Burgundy deduces that they will do so from the San Diego Observatory. Reemployed at KVWN, he and his team set out to rescue Corningstone.

At the observatory, the Alarm Clock is preparing the broadcast. In the distance, Burgundy and crew are greeted by Moondragon, who provides them with transportation to the observatory. After getting briefly lost, the group reaches it.

Burgundy is immediately captured by the Alarm Clock upon entering the observatory and handcuffed. Hauser then orders her to read their manifesto on air, but she refuses, even under threat of death. Burgundy, however, volunteers to read it. Hauser reveals the manifesto to be an advocacy for recycling, electric cars, and personal computers, concepts which everyone present considers absurd. Malcolm Y then demands Burgundy improvise a statement promoting the Alarm Clock on air.

The highly teleprompter-dependent Burgundy is initially speechless, but then equates improvising on air to jazz and reveals their location. When the members of the Alarm Clock realize this, Burgundy calls out for his news team, who then rappels into the observatory and easily overpowers them.

The crew returns to a cheering crowd in San Diego. A network reporter offers Burgundy an upcoming position documenting news anchors. He responds by offering it to Corningstone. Mantooth sees Burgundy and, although he hates him, he proclaims his respect.

The members of the Alarm Clock are later incarcerated for five years. After their release, they invent the Macintosh and make US$6 billion.

== Cast ==
Main cast in credits order:

- Will Ferrell as Ron Burgundy
- Christina Applegate as Veronica Corningstone
- Paul Rudd as Brian Fantana
- Steve Carell as Brick Tamland
- David Koechner as Champion "Champ" Kind
- Kevin Corrigan as Paul Hauser
- Fred Willard as Ed Harken
- Chris Parnell as Garth Holliday
- Chuck D as Malcolm Y
- Maya Rudolph as Kanshashga X
- Kathryn Hahn as Helen
- Fred Armisen as Tino
- Chad Everett as Jess Moondragon
- Tara Subkoff as Mouse
- Justin Long as Chris Harken
- Michael Coleman as a construction worker
- Steve Bannos as Nikos
- Amy Poehler as a bank teller
- Seth Rogen as Scotty the cameraman
- Vince Vaughn as Wes Mantooth
- Bill Kurtis as the narrator

== Reception ==
Bill Beyrer of CinemaBlend, reviewing the film as part of the DVD release for Anchorman: The Legend of Ron Burgundy, called it "quite possibly the very worst pseudo sequel ever"; according to Beyrer, "As much as it claims to be, this is not a continued adventure. Wake-Up Ron Burgundy is nothing more than a collection of deleted scenes and alternate takes ... sewn together with narration and a left out story element included to make it seem like a follow-up. The worst part about this is that a majority of the alternate takes already appear on the deleted scenes or blooper reel of the first film, as well as a majority of the theatrical trailers."

Collin Souter of eFilmCritic was more positive, in his 4 of 5 stars review: "It's a bit choppier than the original and wouldn't make for a good movie on its own, but do you really care? Probably not. Here's what you need to know: IT'S HILARIOUS! [...] It's filled with enough brilliant moments to justify its existence as a sequel/re-make."
