= Felix Wurman =

American cellist and composer

- Felix Wurman passing the donation basket at the Church of Beethoven (photograph by Morgan Petroski for the Albuquerque Journal)

Background information
- Born: Felix Wurman; October 27, 1958; Chicago, Illinois, United States
- Died: December 26, 2009 (aged 51) Hillsborough, North Carolina, United States
- Genres: Classical
- Occupation: Cellist
- Instrument: Cello
- Years active: 1970–2009

Felix Wurman (October 27, 1958 – December 26, 2009) was an American cellist and composer.

== Early years ==
Wurman was the son of Hans Wurman, a Jewish composer and pianist who had escaped from Austria during the Anschluss period of Nazi rule. His brother is composer Alex Wurman.

Wurman began playing the cello at age seven and gave his first public performance, with the Chicago Symphony Orchestra, at age 12. He was invited to attend the Juilliard School, but chose to study in Europe under the British cellist Jacqueline du Pré. Du Pré, who was no longer able to play due to multiple sclerosis, taught Wurman for two years.

== Domus ==
While in England, Wurman focused on chamber music and performed with Open Chamber Music at Prussia Cove in Cornwall, England. Wurman performed with musicians including Hungarian violinist Sándor Végh and Johannes Goritski. In the early 1980s, Wurman was one of the founders of Domus, a chamber music group that performed in its own portable geodesic dome tent built by Wurman. The group, originally consisting of Wurman and Richard Lester on cello, Krysia Osostowicz on violin, Robin Ireland on viola, Michael Faust on flute, and Susan Tomes on piano, began at the International Musicians' Seminars at Prussia Cove. By using a portable concert hall that could be erected by musicians themselves with seating for an audience of 200, Domus sought to build a broader audience for chamber music and performed in unconventional locations. Domus participated in the European festival circuit and later won two German Record Critics' Prizes and a Gramophone Award for Best Chamber Music Recording for its recording of Fauré: Piano Quartets 1 & 2.

Tomes, who went on to become a noted concert pianist and writer, described Wurman as an "animateur of genius" whose love of music, fun and adventure "made people want to be in his gang." Tomes recalled that Wurman came up with the idea to build a portable concert hall using the form of a geodesic dome.

== Return to the United States ==
Wurman later returned to Chicago, joined the Lyric Opera of Chicago Orchestra and became a freelance cellist in Chicago.

Wurman returned to Europe frequently and studied in Amsterdam under Anner Bylsma. Bylsma encouraged Wurman to build a five-string cello so that he could perform a broad repertoire of transcriptions, consisting mostly of works for violin. Wurman performed concerts of the Sonatas and partitas for solo violin at the Los Angeles County Museum of Art and at the Cultural Center in Chicago, both of which were simultaneously broadcast on radio.

Wurman later moved to Albuquerque, New Mexico where he joined the New Mexico Symphony Orchestra. He also continued his interest in chamber music, performing for the Placitas Artist Series, East Mountain Artists Series, Corrales Cultural Arts Council and Albuquerque Chamber Soloists. Wurman also formed the Noisy Neighbors Chamber Orchestra, made up of musicians from the New Mexico Symphony Orchestra. In September 2000, when the Noisy Neighbors began performing under a 200-seat geodesic dome in a parking lot at Cedar Crest, Wurman told the Albuquerque Journal that the new group was a continuation of the Domus concept—a group with a mobile concert hall that would perform any kind of classical music wherever possible.

== Church of Beethoven ==
In early 2007, after performing at a church service, Wurman was inspired to create the "Church of Beethoven." Wurman noted it was not the theology he liked; it was "the ecstasy of the music, and the warmth of the parishioners enjoying it together." Wurman came up with an idea: "How about a church that has music as its principal element, rather than as an afterthought?" Wurman recruited musicians from the New Mexico Symphony Orchestra, and they began playing Sunday concerts in an abandoned gas station off old Route 66. Wurman called the Sunday concerts the Church of Beethoven. Wurman said he founded the church to help people "find spirituality through culture." Wurman named the church after Beethoven because the composer "poured all that spirituality that he couldn't find a place for in the traditional church, he poured it straight into his art." Wurman believed there were many nonreligious people "looking to be uplifted on a Sunday morning." The services also included poetry readings, and one poet who participated described Wurman's goal in forming the Church of Beethoven as follows: "Wurman wanted to foster the same sense of communal experience one can have at a church, but without the dogma."

The Albuquerque Journal described the Church of Beethoven as "an hourlong mix of music, poetry and readings." The Church of Beethoven also received extensive coverage in the national media and was profiled by, among other outlets, National Public Radio and the Los Angeles Times. NPR's Washington correspondent, Brigid McCarthy, described the services as "sort of like a variety show, with poetry readings, group singing, silence and music . . . a community, a spiritual place, like a church for people who don't go to church." The Los Angeles Times described it as "a church without preaching, and without prayer. At its Sunday morning services there is something spiritual, all right, but it doesn't have to do with Allah, or Buddha, or God. Instead, it comes from music, from passionate renditions of works composed by Brahms and Bach and, of course, Beethoven -- for whom the church is named."

In 2008, the Church of Beethoven relocated from the filling station to a new home in a renovated warehouse in downtown Albuquerque which has been described as "rather cathedral-like, with warm red walls, vaulted wood ceilings and stained glass windows." A short documentary film about Felix and the Church of Beethoven by Brad Stoddard and Anthony Della Flora was completed and is for sale on Amazon CreateSpace https://www.createspace.com/291475 on DVD

== Cancer and death ==
Wurman was diagnosed with bladder cancer in November 2008 and underwent surgery in the spring 2009. When the cancer returned and spread to his bone, Wurman left Albuquerque in the fall 2009 to be near his sister in North Carolina and to receive treatment there. The Church of Beethoven continued to thrive even after Wurman's departure as musicians, poets and participants worked to keep the concept alive. One week before Wurman's death, the Church of Beethoven conducted a fundraiser to help pay for Wurman's medical care; the event featured Schubert's Octet in F major with poets giving readings in brief intervals between the six movements. Poets Tony Hunt and Lisa Gill read poems centered on the themes of time, change, and friendship. The service was intended as an opportunity to demonstrate the community's appreciation for Wurman's life and commitment.

Wurman died of complications related to cancer.
