= Gerrit Bijlsma =

Dutch water polo player (1929–2004)

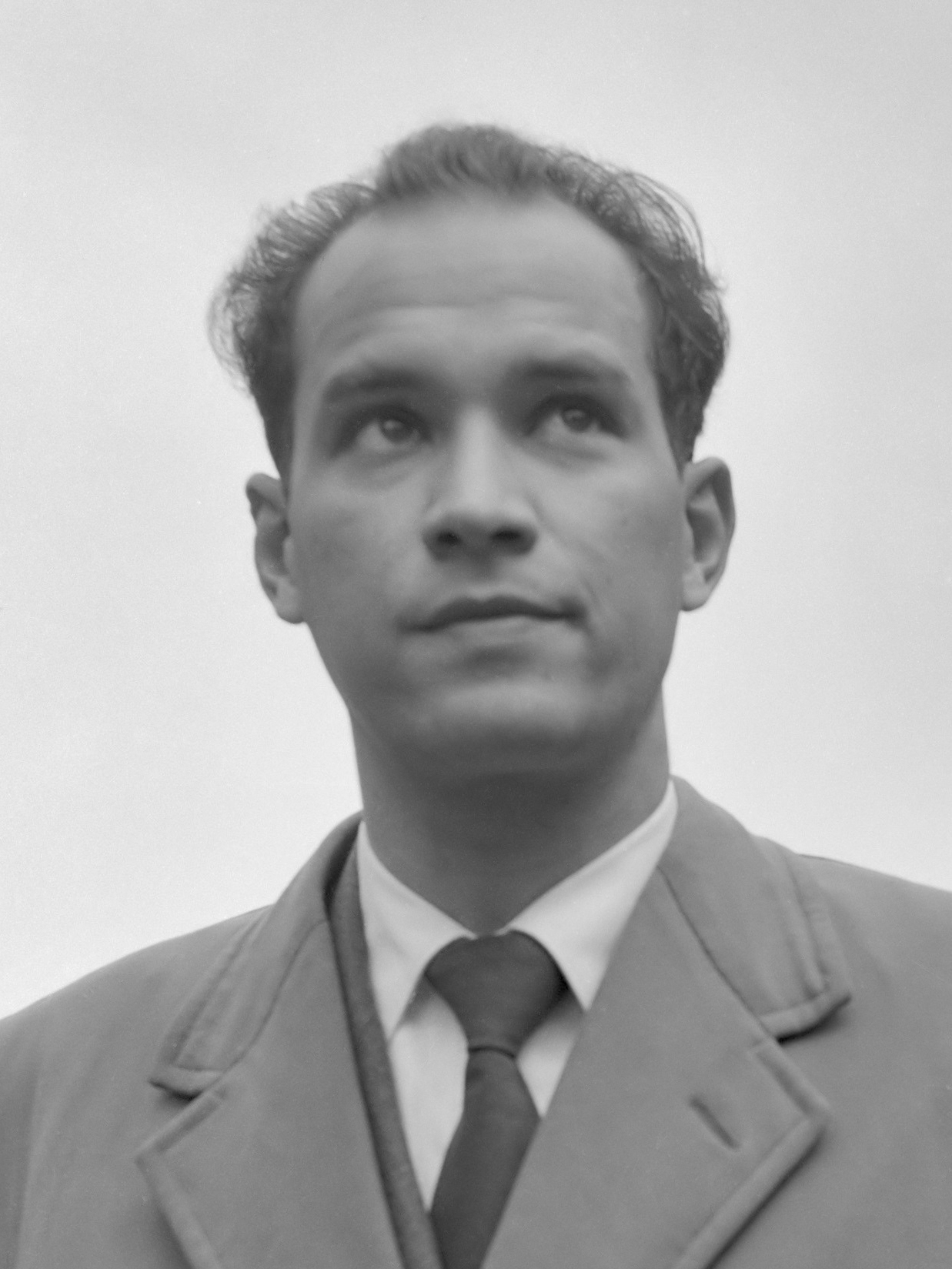
- Bijlsma in 1956

Personal information
- Born: 17 November 1929 Bandung, Indonesia
- Died: 13 August 2004 (aged 74) Haarlem, the Netherlands

Sport
- Sport: Water polo
- Club: ZC Haarlem
Medal record
Representing the Netherlands
European Championships
Gold medal – first place	1950 Vienna	Team

Gerrit Wiebe Bijlsma (17 November 1929 – 13 August 2004) was a Dutch water polo player. He was part of the Dutch teams that won the European title in 1950 and placed fifth at the 1952 Summer Olympics.
