= Johannes Bijlsma =

Dutch philosopher

Education
- Education: Vrije Universiteit Amsterdam (PhD), University of Groningen
- Thesis: Mental disorder and exemption from punishment (2016)

Philosophical work
- Era: 21st-century philosophy
- Region: Western philosophy
- Institutions: University of Groningen, Utrecht University
- Main interests: philosophy of criminal law

Johannes Bijlsma is a Dutch philosopher and endowed professor of philosophy of criminal law (Leo Polak chair) at the University of Groningen. He is also associate professor of criminal law at Utrecht University. Bijlsma is known for his works on criminal law and criminology and is a winner of the 2018 Modderman Prize for his PhD dissertation.
