= Carine Bijlsma =

Dutch filmmaker

Carine Bijlsma (born February 16, 1983) is a Dutch documentary filmmaker and photographer.

== Education ==
After graduating high school she studied photography in New York, Florence, and Amsterdam. She graduated from the Netherlands Film and Television Academy in 2008.

== Awards ==
Her films have won several awards, including an honorable mention in the Short Documentary Award category at the DOXA Documentary Film Festival and the Wildcard.

== Personal life ==
Bijlsma is the daughter of cellist Anner Bylsma and violinist Vera Beths, and the maternal half-sister of actress Katja Herbers.

== Selected filmography ==
- Devil’s Pie - D’Angelo (2019) D’Angelo Questlove Dave Chappelle Alan Leeds’’
- The Secret of Boccherini (2008) on Dutch cellist Anner Bylsma and composer Luigi Boccherini
- Middle School Melodies (2009)
- Soloist (2010) on violinist Rosanne Philippens
- Extase (2011) on conductor Reinbert de Leeuw's 2010 performance of Arnold Schoenberg's Gurrelieder
- Never a Dull Moment (2011) on composer Louis Andriessen
- Like it here? (2014) Elsie de Brauw in the world of Alain Platel

And shorts on designers Jan Taminiau, Daan Roosegaarde, Richard Hutten, Bart Hess, Michael Please, Mayke Nas, Daniel Kleinman and others.
