= Brent White =

American film editor

- Born: United States
- Education: Brigham Young University
- Occupation: Film editor
- Years active: 1988–present
- Children: 4

Brent White is an American film editor with credits on feature films dating from 1993. White has worked on comedy films produced by Judd Apatow, and directed by Apatow, Adam McKay or Paul Feig.

== Education ==
White received his bachelor's degree in film production from the BYU College of Fine Arts and Communications (Brigham Young University) in 1983.

== Editing techniques ==
White's work as an editor on the films directed by Apatow and McKay is unusual because of the importance of the actors' improvisations. Eric Melin's review of the film Talladega Nights (2006) focuses on this aspect of White's editing,

the MVP of the movie is most definitely editor Brent White. Just as he did with 2004's Anchorman: The Legend of Ron Burgundy, White had to choose the best scenes from hours and hours of wildly different takes to fashion together something with a narrative arc that resembles a movie. It can't be easy work, but he had a little more story to work with than he did in the uneven Anchorman. Minor continuity errors be damned, Talladega Nights is one funny film.

The editing of Knocked Up (2007) was described in a feature article by Stephen Rodrick in The New York Times. Rodrick emphasizes the many different versions of the film that were created before deciding on the version that was released, "By the end of last month, when the final edit was done, I had seen five or six versions of Knocked Up. While the arc of the film remained the same, seemingly every line had been traded in and out".

== Personal life ==
White is married and has four children. He lives in the Los Angeles area.

== Selected filmography ==
Editor
Year	Film	Director	Notes
1993	Teenage Bonnie and Klepto Clyde	John Shepphird	
1995	Fluke	Carlo Carlei	
1996	Matilda	Danny DeVito	
1999	Wildflowers	Melissa Painter	First collaboration with Melissa Painter
2000	Panic	Henry Bromell	
2002	The Slaughter Rule	Alex Smith; Andrew J. Smith	
2004	Anchorman: The Legend of Ron Burgundy	Adam McKay	First collaboration with Adam McKay
2005	The 40-Year-Old Virgin	Judd Apatow	First collaboration with Judd Apatow
2006	Talladega Nights: The Ballad of Ricky Bobby	Adam McKay	Second collaboration with Adam McKay
2007	Knocked Up	Judd Apatow	Second collaboration with Judd Apatow
2008	Step Brothers	Adam McKay	Third collaboration with Adam McKay
2009	Funny People	Judd Apatow	Third collaboration with Judd Apatow
2010	The Other Guys	Adam McKay	Fourth collaboration with Adam McKay
2011	Arthur	Jason Winer	
2012	This Is 40	Judd Apatow	Fourth collaboration with Judd Apatow
2013	The Heat	Paul Feig	First collaboration with Paul Feig
2013	Anchorman 2: The Legend Continues	Adam McKay	Fifth collaboration with Adam McKay
2015	Spy	Paul Feig	Second collaboration with Paul Feig
2016	Ghostbusters	Paul Feig	Third collaboration with Paul Feig
2018	A Simple Favor	Paul Feig	Fourth collaboration with Paul Feig
2019	Booksmart	Olivia Wilde	
2019	Last Christmas	Paul Feig	Fifth collaboration with Paul Feig
2022	The School for Good and Evil	Paul Feig	Sixth collaboration with Paul Feig
2023	No Hard Feelings	Gene Stupnitsky	
2024	Jackpot!	Paul Feig	Seventh collaboration with Paul Feig
2025	Another Simple Favor	Paul Feig	Eighth collaboration with Paul Feig
2025	The Housemaid	Paul Feig	Ninth collaboration with Paul Feig

Editorial department
Year	Film	Director	Role	Notes
1988	The Milagro Beanfield War	Robert Redford	Apprentice editor	First collaboration with Robert Redford
1989	Glory	Edward Zwick	Assistant editor	
1991	Virgin High	Richard Gabai	Assistant editor	
1991	Double Impact	Sheldon Lettich	Additional editing	
1992	Stop! Or My Mom Will Shoot	Roger Spottiswoode	Associate film editor	
1992	A River Runs Through It	Robert Redford	Additional editor	Second collaboration with Robert Redford
1993	Flashfire	Elliot Silverstein	Associate film editor	
1995	Home for the Holidays	Jodie Foster	First assistant editor	
2005	Steal Me	Melissa Painter	Consulting editor	Second collaboration with Melissa Painter
2008	The Great Buck Howard	Sean McGinly	Additional editor	
2010	She's Out of My League	Jim Field Smith	Additional editing	

Actor
Year	Film	Director	Role
2008	Step Brothers	Adam McKay	Therapy Patient

Thanks
Year	Film	Director	Role
2012	Ben Banks	Bryce Clark	Very special thanks
2021	Finch	Miguel Sapochnik	The filmmakers gratefully thank

Direct-to-video films

Editor
Year	Film	Director
2004	Wake Up, Ron Burgundy: The Lost Movie	Adam McKay

Shorts

Thanks
Year	Film	Director	Role
2006	The Showdown	Antony Sestito; Fulvio Sestito	Special thanks
2014	The Visitant	Nicholas Peterson	Special thanks

TV movies

Editor
Year	Film	Director
1996	Critical Choices	Claudia Weill
1996	Dojo Kids	Susan Rohrer
1998	The Patron Saint of Liars	Stephen Gyllenhaal
1998	Mr. Murder	Dick Lowry
1999	Having Our Say: The Delany Sisters' First 100 Years	Lynne Littman

Editorial department
Year	Film	Director	Role
1990	Johnny Ryan	Robert L. Collins	Assistant editor
1993	And the Band Played On	Roger Spottiswoode	Additional editor

TV series

Editor
Year	Title	Notes
1998	Mr. Murder	2 episodes
2000	Freaks and Geeks	5 episodes
2001	All Souls	1 episode
2002	Undeclared	2 episodes
2002	The Job	1 episode
2004−05	Desperate Housewives	5 episodes
2017	SMILF	1 episode
2017	Future Man	5 episodes
2020	Love Life	1 episode
2021	The Mighty Ducks: Game Changers	3 episodes

Editorial department
Year	Title	Role	Notes
2022	Welcome to Flatch	Additional editor	1 episode

TV shorts

Editor
Year	Film	Director
2003	Life on Parole	Jon Favreau

TV specials

Editor
Year	Title
2002	74th Academy Awards
