= Anchorman: The Legend of Ron Burgundy =

2004 film by Adam McKay

- Theatrical release poster
- Directed by: Adam McKay
- Written by: Will Ferrell; Adam McKay
- Produced by: Judd Apatow
- Starring: Will Ferrell; Christina Applegate; Paul Rudd; Steve Carell; David Koechner; Fred Willard
- Cinematography: Thomas E. Ackerman
- Edited by: Brent White
- Music by: Alex Wurman
- Production company: Apatow Productions
- Distributed by: DreamWorks Pictures
- Release date: July 9, 2004
- Running time: 94 minutes
- Country: United States
- Language: English
- Budget: $26 million
- Box office: $90.6 million

Anchorman: The Legend of Ron Burgundy is a 2004 American satirical comedy film directed by Adam McKay in his directorial debut, produced by Judd Apatow, starring Will Ferrell and Christina Applegate and written by McKay and Ferrell. The first installment in the Anchorman series, the film is a tongue-in-cheek take on the culture of the 1970s, particularly the new Action News format. It portrays a San Diego television station where news anchor Ron Burgundy (Ferrell) clashes with his new co-anchor Veronica Corningstone (Applegate).

The film was released by DreamWorks Pictures on July 9, 2004 and made $28.4 million in its opening weekend, and $90.6 million worldwide against a $26 million budget in its theatrical run. It was met with lukewarm reviews from critics upon release but has undergone a gradual critical reassessment since then as one of the greatest comedy films ever made. It was ranked at number 100 on Bravo's 100 funniest movies, number 6 on Time Out's top 100 comedy films of all time, number 113 on Empire's 500 Greatest Movies of All Time, and number 49 on Rolling Stone's 100 Best Movies of the 21st Century.

Wake Up, Ron Burgundy: The Lost Movie, a companion film assembled from outtakes and abandoned subplots, was released straight-to-DVD on December 28, 2004. A sequel, Anchorman 2: The Legend Continues, was released on December 18, 2013, with Paramount Pictures replacing DreamWorks Pictures as the distributor.

== Plot ==
In 1975, Ron Burgundy is an anchorman for a San Diego TV station, KVWN Channel 4, working alongside friends on the news team: lead field reporter Brian Fantana, sportscaster Champ Kind, and meteorologist Brick Tamland.

Station director Ed Harken informs the team that they have retained their long-held status as the highest-rated news program in San Diego, prompting them to throw a wild party, where Ron unsuccessfully attempts to pick up a beautiful blonde woman named Veronica Corningstone.

Ed later informs the team that they have been forced to hire Veronica. After a series of unsuccessful attempts by the team to seduce her, she finally agrees to a "professional tour" of the city with Ron, culminating in a sexual relationship. Despite agreeing to keep the relationship discreet, Ron announces it on air.

After a dispute with a motorcyclist ends in Ron's beloved dog Baxter being punted off the San Diego–Coronado Bridge, Ron is late to work. Veronica fills in for him on air, drawing higher ratings than Ron usually does, and the couple breaks up when he bemoans her success. Veronica is promoted to co-anchor, to the team's disgust. The co-anchors become fierce rivals off-air while maintaining a phony facade of cordiality on-air.

Depressed, the team (barring Veronica) decides to buy new suits, but Brick, leading the way, gets them lost in a shady part of town. Confronted by the main competitor, Wes Mantooth and his news team, Ron challenges them to a fight. When several other news teams converge on-site (including the Channel Two News team, the Public News Team, and the Spanish-language News team), a full-on melee ensues, only broken up by police sirens that cause them to flee. Realizing that having a female co-anchor is damaging their reputation, Ron gets into another heated argument with Veronica, and they end up in a physical fight after she insults his hair.

After one of Veronica's co-workers informs her that Ron will read whatever is written on the teleprompter, she sneaks into the station and alters the text in revenge. The next day, he (unaware of what he is saying) concludes the broadcast with "Go fuck yourself, San Diego!" instead of his signature closing line, "You stay classy, San Diego!", triggering an angry mob outside the studio and forcing Ed to fire him.

Realizing she went too far, Veronica confesses to him that she was responsible, making him angry. Unemployed, friendless, and heavily antagonized by the public, Ron grows depressed while Veronica enjoys her newfound fame, with Brian, Champ, and Brick begrudgingly working with her. Ed has warned against them talking to Ron, under threat that they'd be fired as well.

Three months later, when a panda is about to give birth, every news team in San Diego rushes to the zoo to cover the story. In an attempt to sabotage her, a rival news anchor pushes Veronica into a Kodiak bear enclosure. When Ed is unable to locate her, he recruits and rehires Ron.

Once at the zoo, Ron, with his morale restored, jumps into the bear pen to save Veronica as the public watches. The rest of the news team then jumps in to save them. Just as a bear is about to attack, Ron's dog Baxter, who miraculously survived his fall, intervenes and encourages the bear to spare them. As the group climbs out of the pit, Wes appears and holds the ladder over the bear pit, threatening to drop Ron back in, saying that deep down, he has always hated him, but then admits he does respect him before pulling him to safety.

After Ron and Veronica reconcile, it is shown that, in the years to come, Brian becomes the host of a Fox reality show named Intercourse Island, Brick is married with 11 children and is a top political adviser to George W. Bush, Champ is a commentator for the NFL before getting fired after being accused by Terry Bradshaw of sexual harassment, and Ron and Veronica are co-anchors for the CNN-esque World News Center.

== Cast ==
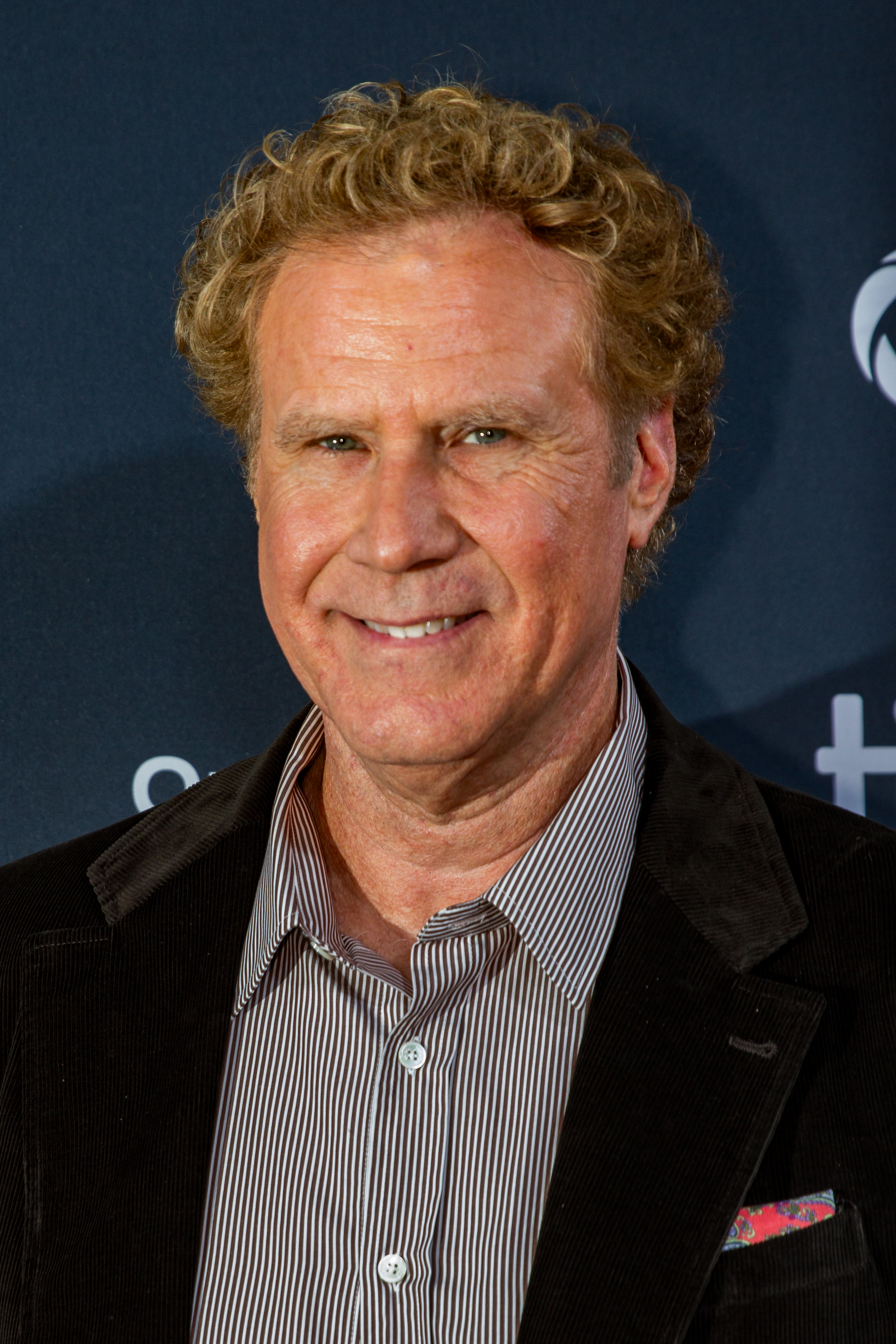
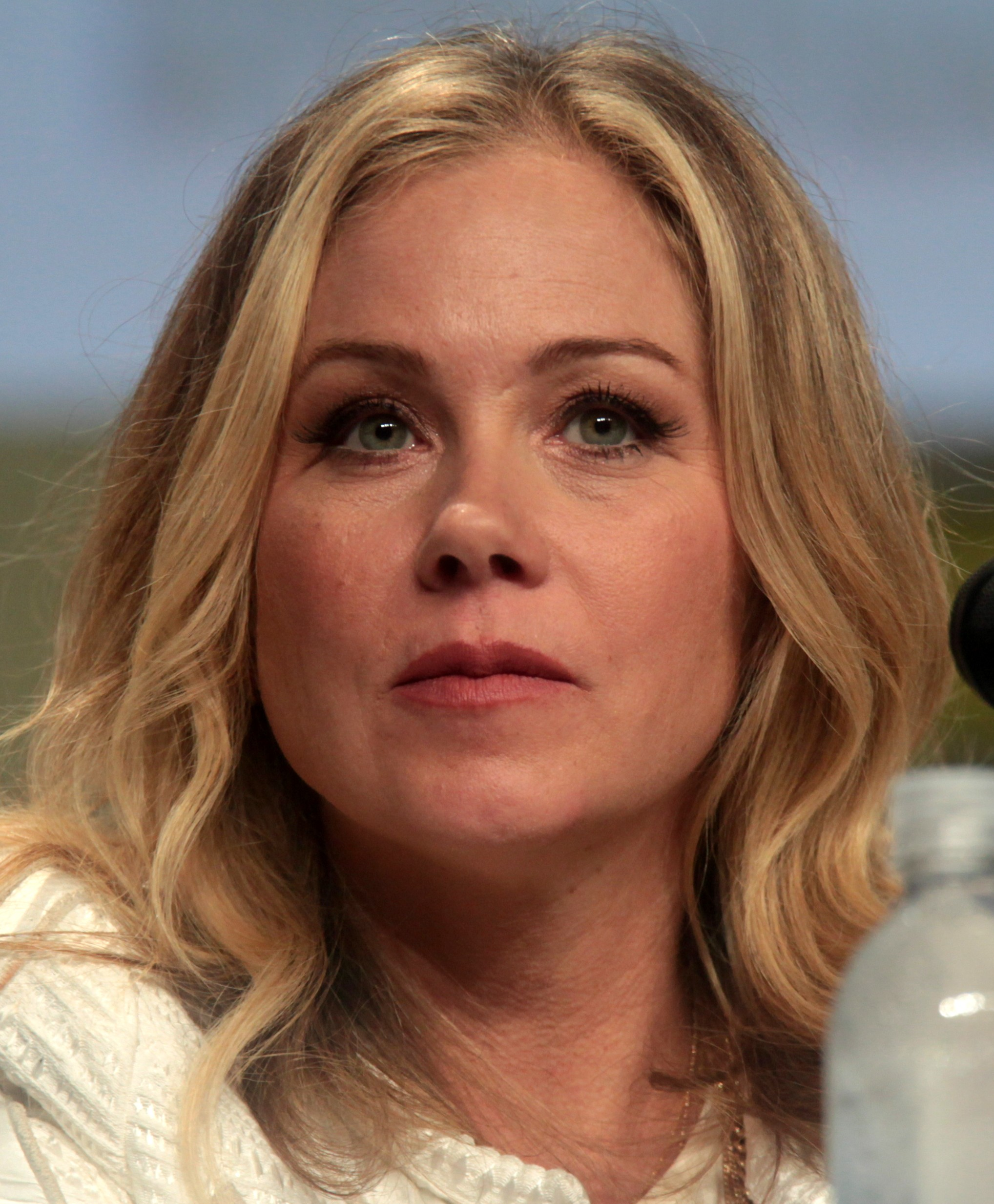
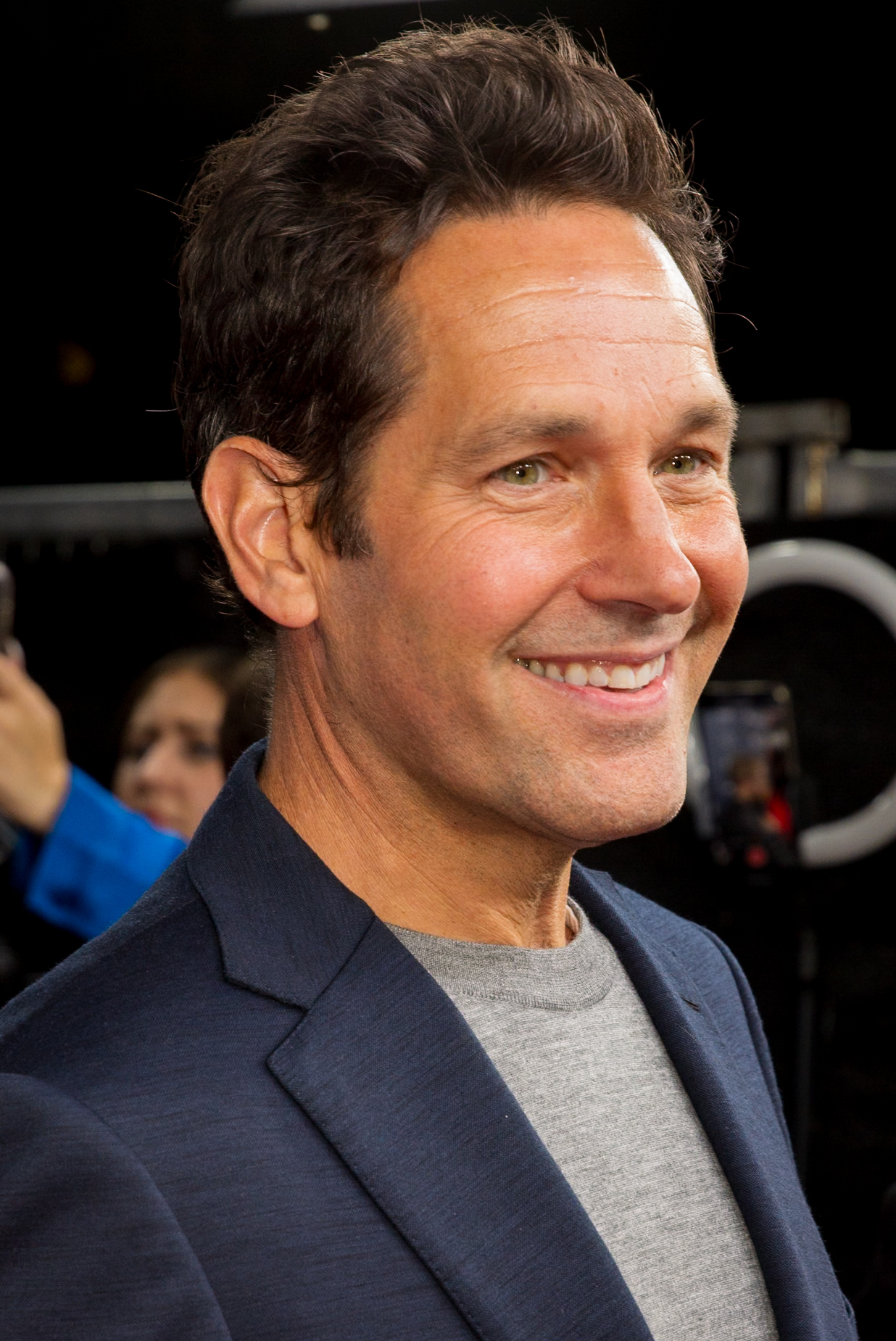
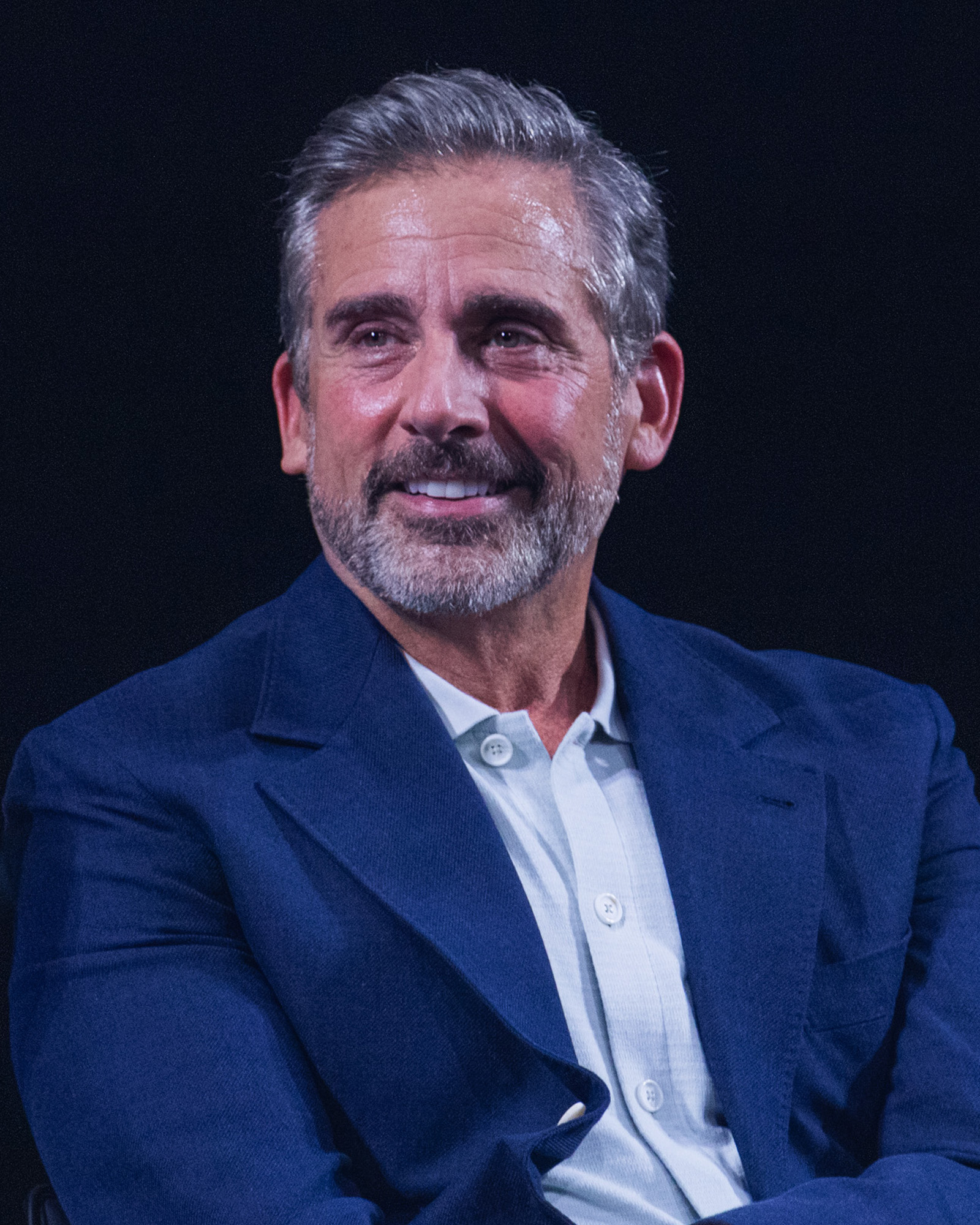
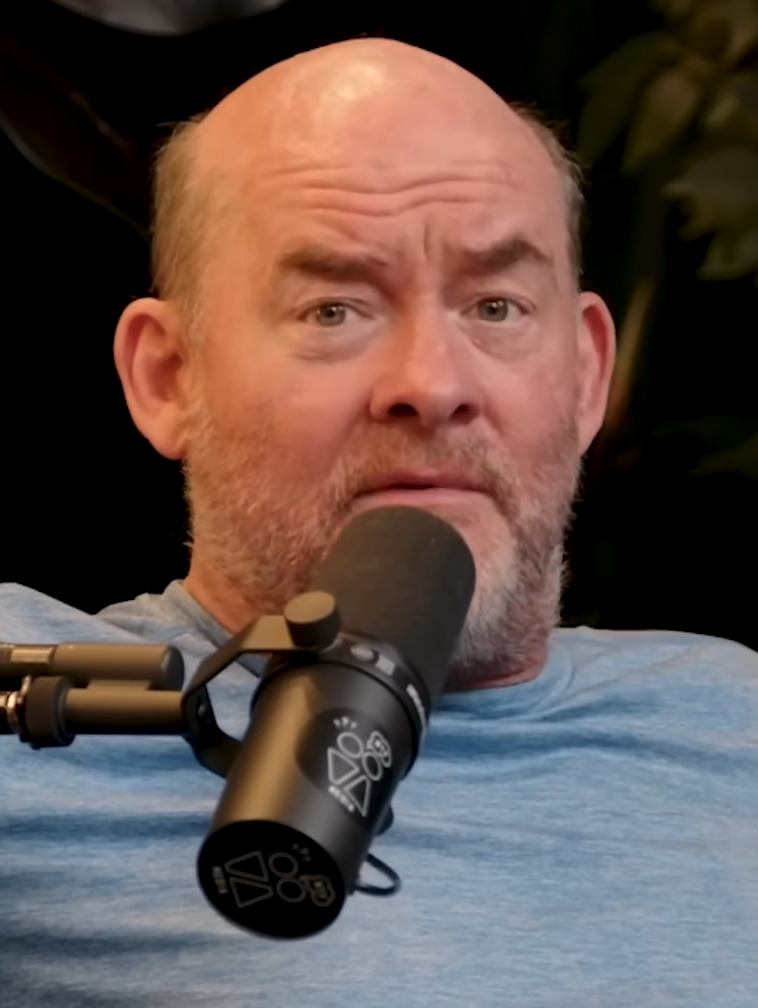
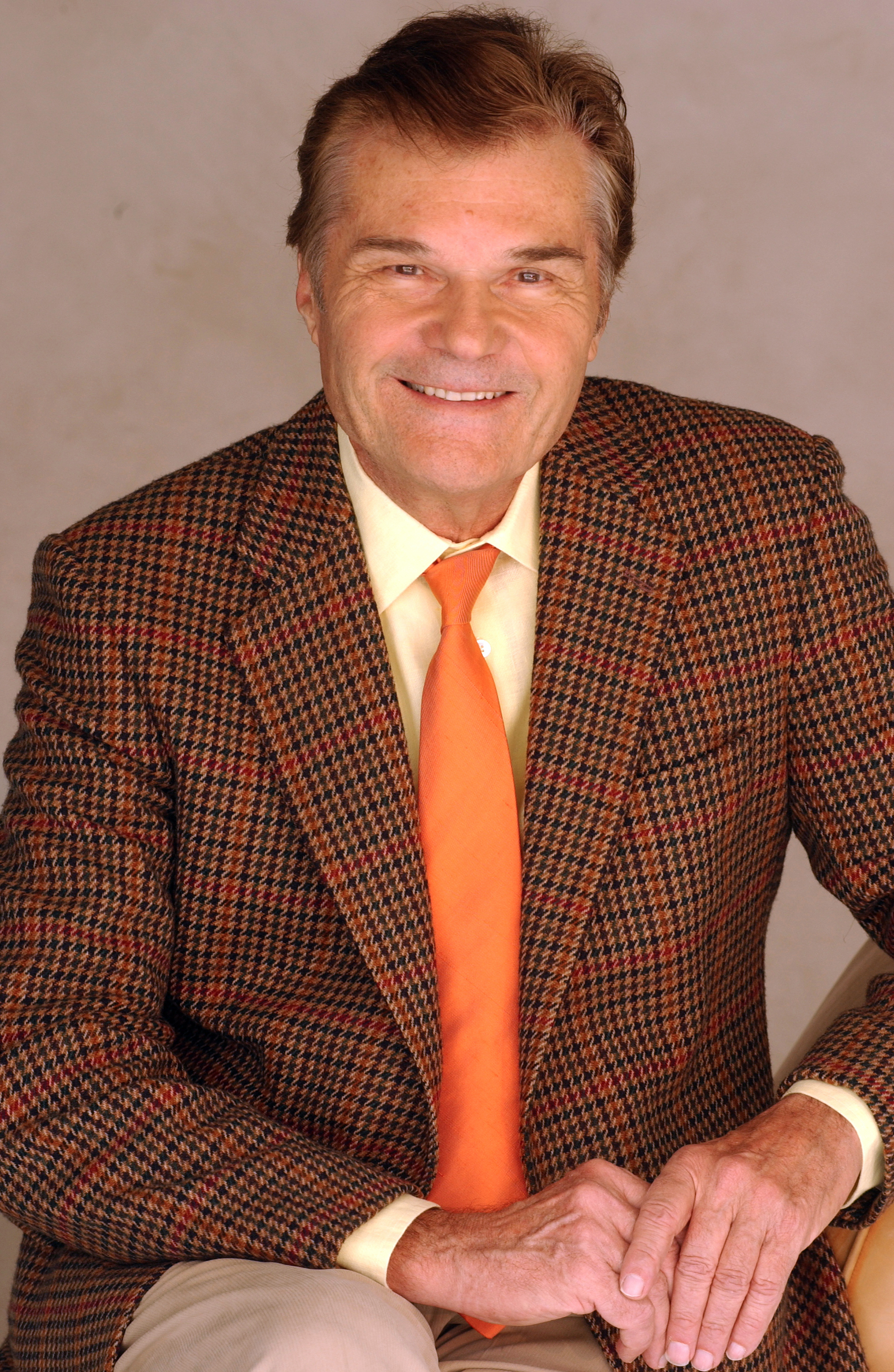
(Top, left to right) Will Ferrell (pictured in 2012), Christina Applegate (2014), and Paul Rudd (2015); (Bottom) Steve Carell (2025), David Koechner (2013), and Fred Willard (2008)
- Will Ferrell as Ron Burgundy – Anchorman for a small news station in San Diego called KVWN Channel 4.
- Christina Applegate as Veronica Corningstone – Intelligent news anchor beside Ron Burgundy for KVWN Channel 4.
- Paul Rudd as Brian Fantana – Friend, field reporter, and coworker of Ron Burgundy. Known for being a ladies' man.
- Steve Carell as Brick Tamland – Weatherman at KVWN Channel 4. Known for being mentally challenged and part of Ron Burgundy's crew.
- David Koechner as Champ Kind – Sportscaster at KVWN Channel 4. Comes across as masculine, sexist, and enthusiastic.
- Chris Parnell as Garth Holliday
- Kathryn Hahn as Helen
- Fred Armisen as Tino
- Fred Willard as Ed Harken
- Vince Vaughn as Wes Mantooth
- Jerry Minor as Tino's Bassist
- Laura Kightlinger as Donna
- Danny Trejo as a Bartender
- Jack Black as a Motorcyclist
- Judd Apatow as a News Station Employee
- Paul F. Tompkins as a Cat Fashion Show Host
- Jay Johnston as a Member of the Eyewitness News Team
- Adam McKay as a Janitor
- Tim Robbins as the Public News Anchor
- Luke Wilson as Frank Vitchard
- Ben Stiller as Arturo Mendez
- Missi Pyle as a Zoo Keeper
- Seth Rogen as Scotty
- Bill Kurtis as The Narrator

=== Casting ===
Will Ferrell and Adam McKay wanted Ed Harris to play Ed Harken, which was eventually given to Fred Willard. Dan Aykroyd was considered for the role of Garth Holiday. Alec Baldwin was considered for the role of Frank Vitchard. James Spader was considered for the role of Brick Tamland. Bob Odenkirk, Ben Stiller and Ron Livingston were all considered for the role of Brian Fantana. John C. Reilly was originally considered for the role of Champ Kind. Amy Adams, Leslie Mann, and Maggie Gyllenhaal auditioned for the role of Veronica Corningstone.

== Production ==
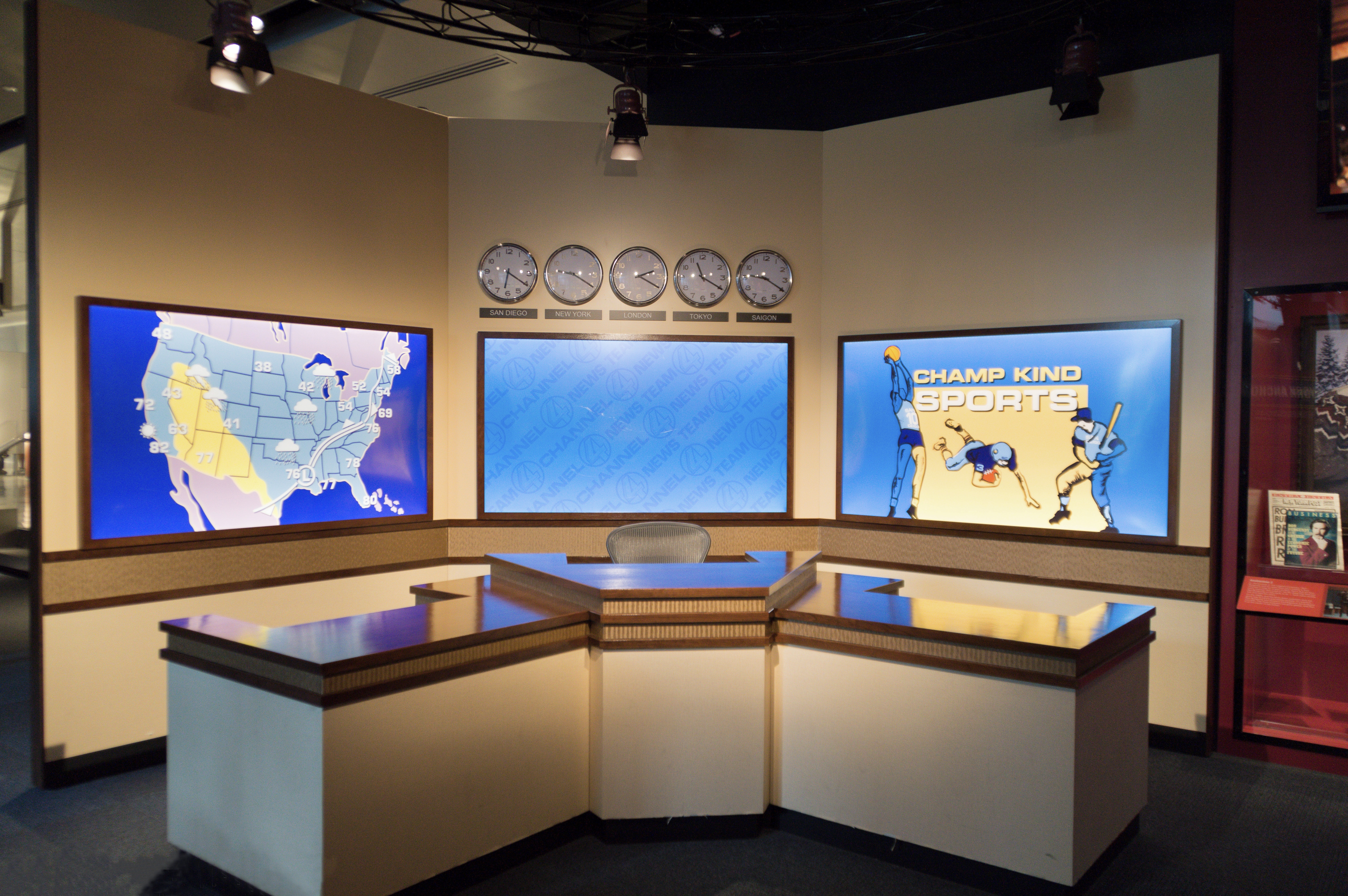
The Anchorman Newsdesk

While still at Saturday Night Live, Will Ferrell and Adam McKay began working on a script titled August Blowout, which Ferrell would later describe as "Glengarry Glen Ross meets a car dealership". Although the script was popular around Hollywood, the resulting movie never got made. One of the readers was Paul Thomas Anderson who offered to "shepherd" a script written by the pair. McKay has stated that the idea for the film that would become Anchorman came about after "Will saw an interview with a '70s anchorman, talking about how sexist they were. And it was that tone of voice he loved."

An early version of the script was a parody of the disaster film Alive with a group of news people, after Ron Burgundy crashes their plane, stranded in the wilderness trying to make their way back to civilization. A subplot would involve the characters trying to escape from a group of ninjastar wielding orangutans. Adam McKay stated that a version of the script originally included "a musical number with sharks". Anderson, who at the time was scheduled to produce the film, was taken aback by the script's bizarre nature, so much so that afterwards he left production, although in retrospect he mentioned lightheartedly, "I blew that [opportunity]."

Even though Anchorman is set in San Diego, the real San Diego is almost exclusively seen in brief aerial shots which visibly include numerous buildings in downtown San Diego which had not yet been built or opened during the 1970s. According to the official production notes and "making of" documentary (both included on the DVD), Anchorman was mainly filmed in Los Angeles, Glendale, and Long Beach on sets which were made to look like San Diego during the 1970s. The film does not explicitly state the year in which it takes place, but the characters knowing the lyrics to "Afternoon Delight", as well as a reference to Gene Tenace playing for the San Diego Padres, places the film in 1977 or shortly thereafter.

The film initially centered around the reporters tracking down a clumsy yet elusive group of hippie bank robbers known as "The Alarm Clock". This version of the film was met with poor test audience results, which Ferrell attributed to uncomfortable lampooning of the Patty Hearst kidnapping, and a significant portion of the film was re-written and re-shot to replace the Alarm Clock with the panda story that appeared in the final version. The original Alarm Clock version was re-edited, along with alternate takes of existing scenes and new narration, to form a separate direct-to-video film entitled Wake Up, Ron Burgundy: The Lost Movie. It was released straight to DVD on December 28, 2004.

The physical appearance of the Ron Burgundy character may have been modeled after real-life news anchorman Harold Greene, who worked at KCST-TV and KGTV in San Diego during the mid-1970s and early 1980s. Prior to the release of the 2013 sequel to Anchorman, retired news anchor Mort Crim, best known for his work at KYW-TV in Philadelphia and WDIV in Detroit, claimed that he was chosen by Ferrell as the inspiration for Ron Burgundy.

Among Crim's colleagues during his time in Philadelphia was Jessica Savitch, who would later go on to a prominent role at NBC News. Savitch served as a model for the character of Veronica Corningstone, played by Christina Applegate.

Although he does not appear in the final film, John C. Reilly attended an early read-through and impressed Ferrell so much that a part in Talladega Nights: The Ballad of Ricky Bobby was developed for him; he would later appear in the 2013 sequel.

Ferrell and McKay recorded an audio commentary for the film's home release which consists of random, mostly facetious discussions of no relevance to the film or its production.

=== Music ===
The film's musical score was composed by Alex Wurman. A soundtrack album compiling the songs used in the film was released on July 9, 2004. The "jazz flute" solo heard in the film is played by Katisse Buckingham, a Los Angeles-based studio musician.

== Reception ==
=== Box office ===
Anchorman: The Legend of Ron Burgundy grossed $85,288,303 in North America, and $5,285,885 in other countries, for a worldwide total of $90,574,188. In North America, the film opened at number two in its first weekend, with $28,416,365, behind Spider-Man 2. In its second weekend, the film dropped to number three in the United States, grossing an additional $13,849,313. In its third weekend, the film dropped to number six in the United States, grossing $6,974,614. In its fourth weekend, the film dropped to number nine in the United States, grossing $3,132,946. Audiences polled by CinemaScore gave the film an average grade "B" on an A+ to F scale.

=== Critical response ===
Anchorman: The Legend of Ron Burgundy received generally positive reviews from critics. Rotten Tomatoes gives the film a score of 66% based on 202 reviews, with an average rating of 6.30/10. The website's critical consensus reads: "Filled with inspired silliness and quotable lines, Anchorman isn't the most consistent comedy in the world, but Will Ferrell's buffoonish central performance helps keep this portrait of a clueless newsman from going off the rails." Another review aggregation website, Metacritic, assigned a weighted average score of 63 out of 100, based on 38 reviews, indicating "generally favorable" reviews. The film is now considered by many to be one of the best comedy films of the 2000s. Empire magazine ranked Ron Burgundy #26 in their "The 100 Greatest Movie Characters" poll. Empire also ranked Anchorman at number 113 in their poll of the 500 Greatest Films Ever. Entertainment Weekly ranked Burgundy #40 in their "The 100 Greatest Characters of the Last 20 Years" poll and Ferrell said, "He is my favorite character I've played, if I have to choose one ... Looking back, that makes it the most satisfying thing I've ever done".

Kirk Honeycutt of The Hollywood Reporter gave the film a positive review, saying, "Proving that even infantile humor can be funny, Anchorman: The Legend of Ron Burgundy does make you laugh even if you hate yourself for doing so." Brian Lowry of Variety gave the film a positive review, saying, "Ferrell has seized on a clever concept rife with possibilities – namely, women breaking the glass ceiling in male-dominated TV news during the '70s – and smartly surrounded himself with a topnotch cast." Manohla Dargis of the Los Angeles Times gave the film a positive review, saying, "Tightly directed by newcomer Adam McKay, a former head writer on Saturday Night Live who cooked up the screenplay with Ferrell, Anchorman never reaches the sublime heights of that modern comedy classic There's Something About Mary. Big deal—it's a hoot nonetheless and the scaled-down aspirations seem smart". Claudia Puig of USA Today gave the film three out of four stars, saying, "That he can make his anchorman chauvinistic, deluded and ridiculous but still manage to give him some humanity is testimony to Ferrell's comic talents". Owen Gleiberman of Entertainment Weekly gave the film a C+, saying, "Yet for a comedy set during the formative era of happy-talk news, Anchorman doesn't do enough to tweak the on-camera phoniness of dum-dum local journalism". Peter Travers of Rolling Stone gave the film three out of four stars, saying, "If you sense the presence of recycled jokes from Animal House onward, you'd be right. But you'd be wrong to discount the comic rapport Ferrell has with his cohorts, notably the priceless Fred Willard as the harried station manager". Roger Ebert of the Chicago Sun-Times gave the film three out of four stars, saying, "Most of the time... Anchorman works, and a lot of the time it's very funny".

James Berardinelli of ReelViews gave the film three out of four stars, saying, "Ferrell carries the movie on his broad shoulders, nailing the character perfectly." Michael Wilmington of the Chicago Tribune gave the film two and a half stars out of four, saying, "It's a cute, silly, likable movie without much weight or intensity, but it's also pretty funny." Ella Taylor of L.A. Weekly gave the film a negative review, saying, "It's a long string of heavy-footed sight and sound gags that must have seemed a stitch at the drawing board, but made me squirm in my seat." Bill Muller of The Arizona Republic gave the film three out of four stars, saying, "For every gag that works, there's one that doesn't, and the story is too thin to keep us engaged otherwise." Terry Lawson of the Detroit Free Press gave the film two out of four stars, saying, "Little more than an extended Saturday Night Live skit with better wigs, real locations and a script that sputters as soon as its one-joke premise is exhausted." Rene Rodriguez of the Miami Herald gave the film two out of four stars, saying, "It's a flat, dull picture marked by sporadic flashes of ridiculous brilliance." A.O. Scott of The New York Times gave the film three out of five stars, saying, "It is not as maniacally uninhibited as Old School or as dementedly lovable as Elf, but its cheerful dumbness is hard to resist." Stephen Cole of The Globe and Mail gave the film two-and-a-half stars out of four, saying, "Knights of Columbus! Wouldn't it be great if TV-based comedians weren't afraid of making movies that were funnier than they are?" Geoff Pevere of the Toronto Star gave the film two out of five stars, saying, "Like most of these sofa-spud comedies, Anchorman bears its attention-deficit disorder proudly, as it shifts tone and abruptly sidetracks."

Ty Burr of The Boston Globe gave the film two-and-a-half stars out of four, saying, "Sloppy, crude, pursuing the most far-flung tangents in hopes of a laugh, Anchorman still gave me more stupid giggles than I'd care to admit if I weren't paid to." Michael Booth of The Denver Post gave the film three-and-a-half stars out of four, saying, "Always affectionate toward its people, especially when they are at their most ridiculous, Anchorman meticulously builds America's dimmest news team. And we root for them." Jack Mathews of the New York Daily News gave the film three out of four stars, saying, "As much credit as Ferrell deserves for keeping this nonsense from slipping off the screen, Applegate deserves as well." Megan Lehmann of the New York Post gave the film two out of four stars, saying, "Ferrell is funny spouting his weird stream-of-consciousness rants, but too often the plot leaves him hanging and he resorts to just Yelling Really Loud." Jay Boyar of the Orlando Sentinel gave the film two out of five stars, saying, "Most of it isn't even as funny as those supposedly humorous features that local news broadcasts sometimes end with." Joe Baltake of The Sacramento Bee gave the film three out of four stars, saying, "There isn't a second that goes by without Ferrell filling it with some form of comic shtick – a well-turned punch line, a goofy facial expression, a pratfall or some other kind of physical comedy business." Moira MacDonald of The Seattle Times gave the film two out of four stars, saying, "While the film is sporadically funny, it was done much better on the small screen, decades ago." Anna Smith of Time Out gave the film a positive review, saying, "Takes a joke and runs with it – sometimes too far, but usually long enough to wear you down and force you to submit to its craziness."

=== Legacy ===
In the years following its release, Anchorman has reached cult status, with the film being described as a "cult comedy", a "cult classic", a "cult hit", and having a cult or cult-like following by the time its sequel was released in 2013; such characterizations have been reiterated since then.

Anchorman is known for its quotability, containing many memorable lines, and it has been called one of the most quotable comedies as well as one of the most quotable films in general. Well-known lines include "boy, that escalated quickly", "60% of the time, it works every time", "milk was a bad choice", and "I love lamp". Ferrell stated in 2013 that he had no idea that the film would take off like it did, saying "We had no idea that certain lines would be quoted the way they are and that the film would just take on this life after it left theatres, but thank God it did."

BBC presenter Andrew Marr (in 2021) and Sky News presenter Dermot Murnaghan (in 2023) both closed the final broadcast of their long tenures at their respective channels (21 years and 15 years, respectively) with a reference to Ron Burgundy's signature closing line "Stay classy, San Diego".

Some Anchorman quotes served as the basis for Internet memes such as "Well, that escalated quickly" (also referred to as "That escalated quickly"), which is a variation on the aforementioned quote from the film, and "I'm not even mad; that's amazing".

In June 2025, it ranked number 85 on The New York Times' list of "The 100 Best Movies of the 21st Century" and was one of the films voted for the "Readers' Choice" edition of the list, finishing at number 185. In July 2025, it ranked number 49 on Rolling Stone's list of "The 100 Best Movies of the 21st Century."

== Home media ==
Anchorman: The Legend of Ron Burgundy was released on VHS and DVD (as well as an unrated version) on December 28, 2004, by DreamWorks Home Entertainment. The film was also released on Blu-ray on March 15, 2011. Ahead of the 20th anniversary of its release, Paramount Home Entertainment released the film on 4K Ultra HD Blu-ray on July 2, 2024.

== Sequel ==
A sequel, titled Anchorman 2: The Legend Continues, was released on December 18, 2013. Adam McKay, the director of the first film, returned as director. The main cast, including Will Ferrell, Steve Carell, Paul Rudd, David Koechner, and Christina Applegate reprised their roles. New cast included Meagan Good, James Marsden and Kristen Wiig.

== See also ==
- Anchorman: Music from the Motion Picture
- Frat Pack
- List of media set in San Diego
- 1970s nostalgia
