= Alex Wurman =

American composer (born 1966)

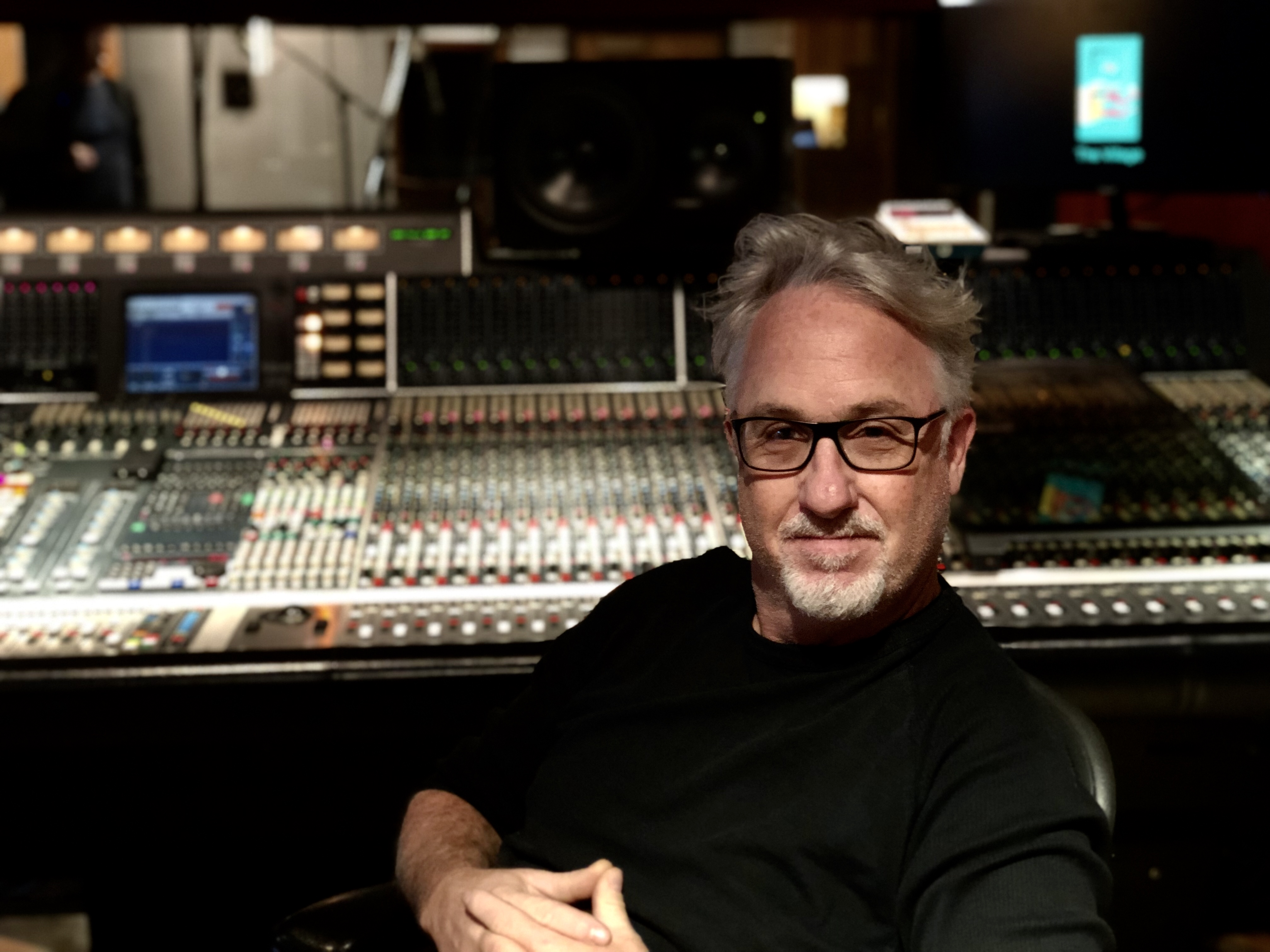
- Wurman in 2019

Background information
- Born: 5 October 1966 (age 59); Chicago, Illinois, U.S.
- Genres: Film score
- Occupation: Composer
- Instruments: Piano, keyboard, synthesizer, guitar
- Years active: 1993–present
- Website: alexwurman.com

Alex Wurman (born October 5, 1966) is an American composer who hails from Chicago. He is best known for his film scores to March of the Penguins, Anchorman: The Legend of Ron Burgundy, Talladega Nights: The Ballad of Ricky Bobby, and the TV series Patriot.

== Early life and career ==
Wurman was born in Chicago, to parents Brenda and Hans Wurman, both musicians. His father was a Jewish arranger and composer who wowed the world of electronic music with one of the first Moog synthesizer recordings ('Moog Strikes Bach,' RCA 1969), and before that he escaped from Austria during the Anschluss period of Nazi rule. His brother was cellist Felix Wurman.

Wurman attended Oak Park and River Forest High School in Oak Park, Illinois, and the Chicago Academy for the Arts. He went on to study at the University of Miami in Coral Gables and later the American Conservatory of Music in Chicago.

After moving to Los Angeles in his early twenties, Wurman began scoring films for students at the American Film Institute.

Wurman has written many film scores, including those for the Oscar-winning documentary March of the Penguins, plus Hollywood Homicide, Criminal, Anchorman, Confessions of a Dangerous Mind, What Doesn't Kill You, The Nines, Hero, The Switch, Unfinished Business, Run Fatboy Run, Talladega Nights: The Ballad of Ricky Bobby, the contemporary interpretations of French impressionism in Thirteen Conversations About One Thing, the first season of Newsroom and Temple Grandin, for which he won the 2010 Emmy Award for Outstanding Music Composition for a Miniseries, Movie or a Special (Original Dramatic Score). He was previously nominated for a Primetime Emmy Award in 2008 for Bernard and Doris.

Wurman was also a judge for the 10th annual Independent Music Awards to support independent artists' careers.

As of June 2019, his most recent score is the Epix TV series Perpetual Grace, LTD.

== Awards ==
Primetime Emmy Awards

- 2010: Temple Grandin (Outstanding Music Composition for a Miniseries, Movie or a Special (Original Dramatic Score))
- 2008: Bernard and Doris (Outstanding Music Composition for a Miniseries, Movie or a Special (Original Dramatic Score)) (nomination)

BMI Film and TV Awards

- 2007: Talladega Nights: The Ballad of Ricky Bobby (BMI Film Music Award)
- 2006: March of the Penguins (BMI Film Music Award)
- 2005: Anchorman: The Legend of Ron Burgundy (BMI Film Music Award)

The Jackson Hole Wildlife Film Festival Awards

- 2011: The Last Lions (Best Music)
