= Apatow Productions =

American film production company

The Apatow Company
- Trade name: Apatow Productions
- Type: Private
- Industry: Film, TV
- Founded: 1999; 27 years ago
- Founder: Judd Apatow
- Headquarters: Los Angeles, California, U.S.

The Apatow Company, doing business as Apatow Productions, is an American film and television production company founded by Judd Apatow in 1999.

The company's first television production was the comedy series Freaks and Geeks (1999–2000), and its first film production was the comedy film Anchorman: The Legend of Ron Burgundy (2004). Its frequent collaborators include Adam McKay, Will Ferrell, Seth Rogen, and Jason Segel. The current logo consists of a praying mantis.

== Films ==
Year(s)	Title(s)	Director(s)	Story by	Writer(s)	Producer(s)	Distributor(s)	Co-production with	Budget(s)	Worldwide gross
2004	Anchorman: The Legend of Ron Burgundy	Adam McKay	Will Ferrell and Adam McKay		Judd Apatow	DreamWorks Pictures	—N/a	$26 million	$90.5 million
2005	The 40-Year-Old Virgin	Judd Apatow	Judd Apatow and Steve Carell		Judd Apatow, Clayton Townsend and Shauna Robertson	Universal Pictures	—N/a	$26 million	$177.3 million
2006	Talladega Nights: The Ballad of Ricky Bobby	Adam McKay	Will Ferrell and Adam McKay		Jimmy Miller and Judd Apatow	Columbia Pictures	Relativity Media and Mosaic Media Group	$72 million	$162.9 million
2007	Knocked Up	Judd Apatow			Judd Apatow, Shauna Robertson and Clayton Townsend	Universal Pictures	—N/a	$30 million	$219.1 million
2007	Superbad	Greg Mottola	Seth Rogen and Evan Goldberg		Judd Apatow and Shauna Robertson	Columbia Pictures	—N/a	$20 million	$169.9 million
2007	Walk Hard: The Dewey Cox Story	Jake Kasdan	Judd Apatow and Jake Kasdan		Judd Apatow, Hunter Baumann and Clayton Townsend	Columbia Pictures	Relativity Media	$35 million	$20.6 million
2008	Drillbit Taylor	Steven Brill	Kristofor Brown, John Hughes and Seth Rogen	Kristofor Brown and Seth Rogen	Judd Apatow, Susan Arnold and Donna Arkoff Roth	Paramount Pictures	Roth/Arnold Productions	$40 million	$49.7 million
2008	Forgetting Sarah Marshall	Nicholas Stoller	Jason Segel		Judd Apatow, Shauna Robertson and Rodney Rothman	Universal Pictures	—N/a	$30 million	$105.2 million
2008	Step Brothers	Adam McKay	Will Ferrell, Adam McKay, and John C. Reilly	Will Ferrell and Adam McKay	Jimmy Miller and Judd Apatow	Columbia Pictures	Relativity Media, Mosaic Media Group and Gary Sanchez Productions	$65 million	$128.1 million
2008	Pineapple Express	David Gordon Green	Judd Apatow, Seth Rogen and Evan Goldberg	Seth Rogen and Evan Goldberg	Judd Apatow and Shauna Robertson	Columbia Pictures	Relativity Media, Korty/Gordon Green Productions and Point Grey Pictures	$27 million	$101.6 million
2009	Year One	Harold Ramis		Harold Ramis, Gene Stupnitsky and Lee Eisenberg	Harold Ramis, Judd Apatow and Clayton Townsend	Columbia Pictures	Ocean Pictures	$60 million	$62.4 million
2009	Funny People	Judd Apatow			Judd Apatow, Clayton Townsend and Barry Mendel	Universal Pictures	Columbia Pictures, Relativity Media and Madison 23 Productions	$75 million	$71.6 million
2010	Get Him to the Greek	Nicholas Stoller			Judd Apatow, Nicholas Stoller, David Bushell and Rodney Rothman	Universal Pictures	Relativity Media and Spyglass Entertainment	$40 million	$91.3 million
2011	Bridesmaids	Paul Feig	Annie Mumolo and Kristen Wiig		Judd Apatow, Barry Mendel and Clayton Townsend	Universal Pictures	Relativity Media	$32 million	$288.4 million
2012	Wanderlust	David Wain	David Wain and Ken Marino		Judd Apatow, Ken Marino, Paul Rudd and David Wain	Universal Pictures	Relativity Media	$32 million	$21.6 million
2012	The Five-Year Engagement	Nicholas Stoller	Jason Segel and Nicholas Stoller		Judd Apatow, Nicholas Stoller and Rodney Rothman	Universal Pictures	Relativity Media	$30 million	$53.9 million
2012	This Is 40	Judd Apatow			Judd Apatow, Barry Mendel and Clayton Townsend	Universal Pictures	—N/a	$35 million	$88.1 million
2013	Anchorman 2: The Legend Continues	Adam McKay	Will Ferrell and Adam McKay		Judd Apatow, Will Ferrell and Adam McKay	Paramount Pictures	Gary Sanchez Productions	$50 million	$173.6 million
2014	Begin Again	John Carney			Anthony Bregman, Tobin Armbrust and Judd Apatow	The Weinstein Company	Exclusive Media, Sycamore Pictures, Black Label Media and Likely Story	$8 million	$63.5 million
2015	Trainwreck	Judd Apatow	Amy Schumer		Judd Apatow and Barry Mendel	Universal Pictures	—N/a	$35 million	$113 million
2016	Pee-wee's Big Holiday	John Lee	Paul Reubens and Paul Rust		Judd Apatow and Paul Reubens	Netflix	Pee-wee Pictures	—N/a	
2016	Popstar: Never Stop Never Stopping	Akiva Schaffer and Jorma Taccone	Andy Samberg, Akiva Schaffer and Jorma Taccone		Judd Apatow, Rodney Rothman, Andy Samberg, Akiva Schaffer and Jorma Taccone	Universal Pictures	Perfect World Pictures and The Lonely Island	$20 million	$9.5 million
2017	The Big Sick	Michael Showalter	Emily V. Gordon and Kumail Nanjiani		Judd Apatow and Barry Mendel	Amazon Studios and Lionsgate	FilmNation Entertainment	$5 million	$53 million
2018	Juliet, Naked	Jesse Peretz	Tamara Jenkins, Jim Taylor, Phil Alden Robinson and Evgenia Peretz		Judd Apatow, Barry Mendel, Albert Berger, Ron Yerxa and Jeffrey Soros	Roadside Attractions and Lionsgate	Rocket Science, Bona Fide Productions and Los Angeles Media Fund	—N/a	$1.9 million
2020	The King of Staten Island	Judd Apatow	Judd Apatow, Pete Davidson and Dave Sirus		Judd Apatow and Barry Mendel	Universal Pictures	Perfect World Pictures	$35 million	$2.2 million
2022	The Bubble	Judd Apatow	Judd Apatow and Pam Brady		Judd Apatow	Netflix	—N/a		
2022	Bros	Nicholas Stoller	Nicholas Stoller and Billy Eichner		Judd Apatow, Nicholas Stoller and Joshua Church	Universal Pictures	Stoller Global Solutions	$22 million	$14.8 million
2023	Please Don't Destroy: The Treasure of Foggy Mountain	Paul Briganti	Martin Herlihy, John Higgins, Scott Sanders and Ben Marshall		Judd Apatow and Jimmy Miller	Universal Pictures and Peacock	Mosaic	—N/a	
2026	Poetic License	Maude Apatow	Raffi Donatich		Judd Apatow, Maude Apatow, Josh Church, Thalia Daniel, Will Greenfield, Benjamin Hung and Olivia Rosenbloom	Sony Pictures Classics	August Night and Jewelbox Pictures	—N/a	
2027	The Comeback King	Judd Apatow	Judd Apatow and Glen Powell		Judd Apatow, Glen Powell, Dan Cohen and Kevin Misher	Universal Pictures	Barnstorm Entertainment and Misher Films	—N/a	
Average								$33,630,435	$100,249,397

=== Critical reception ===
Film	Metacritic	Rotten Tomatoes	References
Anchorman: The Legend of Ron Burgundy	63	66%	
The 40-Year-Old Virgin	73	85%	
Talladega Nights: The Ballad of Ricky Bobby	66	72%	
Knocked Up	85	90%	
Superbad	76	88%	
Walk Hard: The Dewey Cox Story	63	74%	
Drillbit Taylor	41	25%	
Forgetting Sarah Marshall	67	83%	
Step Brothers	51	55%	
Pineapple Express	64	68%	
Year One	34	15%	
Funny People	60	69%	
Get Him to the Greek	65	73%	
Bridesmaids	75	89%	
Wanderlust	53	59%	
The Five-Year Engagement	62	63%	
This Is 40	59	51%	
Anchorman 2: The Legend Continues	61	75%	
Begin Again	62	83%	
Trainwreck	75	85%	
Pee-wee's Big Holiday	63	82%	
Popstar: Never Stop Never Stopping	68	78%	
The Big Sick	86	98%	
Juliet, Naked	67	80%	
The King of Staten Island	67	75%	
The Bubble	34	21%	
Please Don't Destroy: The Treasure of Foggy Mountain	49	42%	
Average score	67	70%	

== Television ==
Title	Creator(s)	Years active	Co-Produced by	Original Network(s)
Freaks and Geeks	Paul Feig	1999–2000	DreamWorks Television	NBC
Undeclared	Judd Apatow	2001–2002	DreamWorks Television	Fox
Funny or Die Presents	Will Ferrell, Adam McKay, Andrew Steele, Judd Apatow	2010–2011	Funnyordie.com, Gary Sanchez Productions	HBO
Girls	Lena Dunham	2012–2017	I Am Jenni Konner Productions and HBO Entertainment	HBO
Love	Judd Apatow, Paul Rust and Lesley Arfin	2016–2018	Legendary Television	Netflix
Crashing	Pete Holmes	2017–2019	Joy Quota	HBO

=== Critical reception ===
TV series	Metacritic	Reference
Freaks and Geeks: Season 1	88	
Undeclared: Season 1	85	
Girls: Season 1	87	
Girls: Season 2	84	
Girls: Season 3	76	
Girls: Season 4	75	
Girls: Season 5	73	
Girls: Season 6	79	
Love: Season 1	73	
Love: Season 2	80	
Love: Season 3	77	
Crashing: Season 1	73	
Crashing: Season 2	68	
Average score	81	

== Documentaries ==
Year	Title	Subject	Director	Distributor
2016	30 for 30 - Doc & Darryl	Dwight Gooden and Darryl Strawberry	Judd Apatow and Michael Bonfiglio	ESPN
2017	May It Last: A Portrait of the Avett Brothers	The Avett Brothers	Judd Apatow and Michael Bonfiglio	Oscilloscope Laboratories
2018	The Zen Diaries of Garry Shandling	Garry Shandling	Judd Apatow	HBO
2020	Voices of Parkland	Parkland high school shooting	Jeff Vespa	Unreleased
2022	George Carlin's American Dream	George Carlin	Judd Apatow and Michael Bonfiglio	HBO
2023	Flipside	Flip Side Records	Chris Wilcha	Oscilloscope Laboratories
2023	Bob and Don: A Love Story	Bob Newhart and Don Rickles	Judd Apatow and Michael Bonfiglio	The New Yorker
2024	Stormy	Stormy Daniels	Sarah Gibson	Peacock
2025	The New Yorker at 100	The New Yorker	Marshall Curry	Netflix
2026	Mel Brooks: The 99 Year Old Man!	Mel Brooks	Judd Apatow and Michael Bonfiglio	HBO
2026	You Had To Be There: How the Toronto Godspell Ignited the Comedy Revolution, Spread Love & Overalls, and Created a Community That Changed the World (In a Canadian Kind of Way)	The Toronto production of Godspell	Nick Davis	Greenwich Entertainment
2026	Norm: The Tale of Norm Macdonald	Norm Macdonald	Judd Apatow	Netflix
2026	Paralyzed by Hope: The Maria Bamford Story	Maria Bamford	Judd Apatow and Neil Berkeley	Netflix

== TV specials ==
Year	Title	Director	Distributor
2016	Hannibal Buress: Hannibal Takes Edinburgh	Ryan Ferguson	Netflix
2016	Pete Holmes: Faces and Sounds	Marcus Raboy	HBO
2017	Chris Gethard: Career Suicide	Kimberly Senior	HBO
2017	Jerry Before Seinfeld	Michael Bonfiglio	Netflix
2017	Judd Apatow: The Return	Marcus Raboy	Netflix
2018	Gary Gulman: The Great Depresh	Michael Bonfiglio	HBO
2018	Loudon Wainwright III: Surviving Twin	Christopher Guest	Netflix
2021	Ricky Velez: Here's Everything	Michael Bonfiglio	HBO

== See also ==
- Big Talk Productions
- Point Grey Pictures
