= Anner Bylsma =

Dutch cellist (1934–2019)

Anner Bylsma (born Anne Bijlsma; 17 February 1934 – 25 July 2019) was a Dutch cellist who played on both modern and period instruments in a historically informed style. He took an interest in music from an early age. He studied with Carel van Leeuwen Boomkamp at the Royal Conservatory of The Hague and won the Prix d'excellence in 1957.

In 1959, he won the first prize in the Pablo Casals Competition in Mexico. By 1961, he was using a new spelling of his first and last names for recordings and performances at the suggestion of his manager. For six years, from 1962 to 1968, he was the principal cellist of the Royal Concertgebouw Orchestra. He became an Erasmus Scholar at Harvard University in 1982. He was the author of the book Bach, the Fencing Master, a stylistic and aesthetic analysis of Bach's cello suites. He was one of the pioneers of the "Dutch Baroque School" and rose to fame as a partner of Frans Brüggen and Gustav Leonhardt, who toured extensively together and made many recordings. Bylsma continued to be a towering figure in the baroque cello movement.

In 1979, Bylsma recorded the six suites for unaccompanied cello (BWV 1007–1012) by J. S. Bach, the first of its kind on a period instrument. He later went on to recreate the same music in 1992 on the large Servais Stradivarius and on a five-string violoncello piccolo.

Bylsma was married to the Dutch violinist Vera Beths (mother of Dutch actress Katja Herbers). He had a son and a daughter, documentary filmmaker Carine Bijlsma.
