= Valley Girl (soundtrack) =

Valley Girl (Music from the Motion Picture)

Soundtrack album / cast recording by the cast of Valley Girl and various artists
- Released: May 8, 2020
- Recorded: 2017–2018
- Genre: Jukebox musical
- Length: 53:48
- Label: Interscope

Singles from Valley Girl (Music from the Motion Picture)
- 1. "We Got the Beat" Released: April 24, 2020

Valley Girl (Music from the Motion Picture) is the soundtrack to the 2020 film Valley Girl, a remake of the 1983 film of the same name. Released through Interscope Records on May 8, 2020, the album comprises music performed by the cast members Jessica Rothe, Josh Whitehouse, Mae Whitman, Peyton List, Chloe Bennet, Jessie Ennis, Ashleigh Murray and Mario Revolori, and covers performed by Deap Vally, American Authors, Van Nice and Leon Else. A cover of the 1982 single "We Got the Beat" by Rothe, Bennet, Ennis and Murray, released as a single on April 24.

== Background ==
The director Rachel Lee Goldenberg felt that reimagining the music for the film was a challenge, as the film was set in the 1980s, she and music supervisor Andrea von Foerster had compiled numerous songs from that era and ensured on selecting songs that fit the film organically. Goldenberg added, "They didn't feel like we were throwing songs in, but that lyrically they connected with the actors. Musically, there was a way for us to make them our own and reimagine them and reproduce them for the movie." The film's music is eventually a compilation of punk rock, pop rock and energetic numbers in solo acts, and duets consisted of ballad and rhythm and blues. A medley is featured in an aerobics dance fight sequence which is a collective of numerous 1980s songs. Modern English's "I Melt with You" and The Plimsouls' "A Million Miles Away", which featured in the 1983 film's soundtrack were also included with Whitehouse performing the covers. She selected most of the songs from the early 1980s to fit the timeline where the film takes place.

== Reception ==
Jesse Hassenger of Nylon summarized "Valley Girl’s reconfigured playlist may be predictable, but it shifts around the action with streaming-ready fluidity." Hannah Hoolihan of Screen Rant wrote "the soundtrack contains several excellent song choices from the '80s that viewers will definitely find themselves singing long after the credits have rolled." Mary Sollosi of Entertainment Weekly wrote "the glossy pop songs, appealing as they are, don't speak well to teenage longing". Peter Debruge of Variety criticised the music as "shallow" and "just second-rate covers of classic songs".

== Track listing ==
Valley Girl (Music from the Motion Picture) track listing
No.	Title	Performed by	Length
1.	"We Got the Beat"	Jessica Rothe, Chloe Bennet, Jessie Ennis and Ashleigh Murray	1:50
2.	"Bad Reputation"	Josh Whitehouse, Mae Whitman and Mario Revolori	1:15
3.	"Hey Mickey / Call Me"	Peyton List and the Valley Girl Cast	1:19
4.	"Girls Just Want to Have Fun"	Ashleigh Murray, Chloe Bennet and Jessica Rothe	2:14
5.	"Kids in America"	Jessica Rothe, Chloe Bennet, Jessie Ennis and Ashleigh Murray and the Valley Girl Cast	2:21
6.	"You Might Think"	Josh Whitehouse, Mae Whitman and the Valley Girl Cast	2:07
7.	"A Million Miles Away"	Deap Vally	3:39
8.	"Makin' Me Like You"	Van Nice	1:52
9.	"Crazy for You"	Josh Whitehouse, Mae Whitman and Mario Revolori	1:37
10.	"Aerobics Mash Up (Just Can't Get Enough / Material Girl / I Can't Go for That / Tainted Love)" (Medley)	Jessica Rothe, Chloe Bennet and Ashleigh Murray	1:51
11.	"Space Age Love Song"	Deap Vally	3:26
12.	"Obsessed with You"	Deap Vally	2:38
13.	"Take On Me"	Josh Whitehouse and Jessica Rothe	2:52
14.	"Safety Dance"	Leon Else	3:01
15.	"Boys Don't Cry"	Josh Whitehouse and Mae Whitman	2:43
16.	"Under Pressure"	Jessica Rothe, Josh Whitehouse and the Valley Girl Cast	3:44
17.	"Dance Hall Days"	American Authors	4:03
18.	"Dancing with Myself"	American Authors	3:30
19.	"Heaven"	American Authors	3:32
20.	"I Melt with You" (duet)	Josh Whitehouse and Mae Whitman	2:20
21.	"I Melt with You" (prom version)	American Authors	2:21
Total length:			53:48
