= Gary Sanchez Productions =

Production company

Gary Sanchez Productions, LLC
- Type: Private
- Industry: Production company
- Founded: 2006; 20 years ago
- Founders: Will Ferrell; Adam McKay
- Defunct: April 8, 2019; 7 years ago
- Fate: Ferrell-McKay partnership dissolution
- Successors: Gloria Sanchez Productions; Hyperobject Industries
- Headquarters: Los Angeles, California, United States

Gary Sanchez Productions, LLC was an American film and television production company founded by Will Ferrell and Adam McKay that was active from 2006 to April 8, 2019.

== History ==
Gary Sanchez Productions was founded in 2006 by comedians and filmmakers Will Ferrell and Adam McKay. The company is named after a fictional "Paraguayan entrepreneur and financier", Gary Sanchez. The logo consists of a coffee cup on a table, with a gun—later replaced by a whip— being placed alongside it. This is followed by Ferrell's raspy voice saying in Spanish, "Esta bien, duro, ¿aight?", as 5 gunshots (later replaced by whip cracks) play in sync with the company name appearing on the table and a star appearing on the coffee cup. In 2007, McKay and Ferrell also founded the video site Funny or Die, under the ownership of the production company.

In August 2018, the company entered a three-year first look feature deal with Paramount Pictures.

On April 8, 2019, it was announced that Ferrell and McKay would be dissolving their partnership, though all developed projects at that time would continue to be completed. It was later revealed the reason for the split was because McKay cast John C. Reilly as Jerry Buss on the show Winning Time: The Rise of the Lakers Dynasty (a role that Ferrell had been interested in) without Ferrell's knowledge.

In October 2019, McKay founded Hyperobject Industries. In January 2020, it was announced that Ferrell had become a partner at the company's former sister label and now successor Gloria Sanchez Productions, taking on new projects with a reorganized company with Gloria Sanchez partner, Jessica Elbaum.

== Filmography ==
=== Film ===
Year	Title	Director	Budget	Gross (worldwide)	Distributor	Notes	Ref.
2006	The Foot Fist Way	Jody Hill	$79,000	$245,292	Paramount Vantage	with You Know I Can't Kiss You, Inc. and MTV Films; first film	
2008	Step Brothers	Adam McKay	$65 million	$128.1 million	Sony Pictures Releasing	with Apatow Productions, Mosaic Media Group, Relativity Media, and Columbia Pictures	
2009	The Goods: Live Hard, Sell Hard	Neal Brennan	$10 million	$15.3 million	Paramount Vantage	with Kevin Messick Productions	
2010	The Other Guys	Adam McKay	$85–100 million	$170.9 million	Sony Pictures Releasing	with Mosaic Media Group and Columbia Pictures	
2010	The Virginity Hit	Huck Botko and Andrew Gurland	$2 million	$636,706	Sony Pictures Releasing	with Principato Young Management and Columbia Pictures	
2012	Tim and Eric's Billion Dollar Movie	Tim Heidecker and Eric Wareheim	$3 million	$201,436	Magnet Releasing	with Abso Lutely Films, Funny or Die Films, and 2929 Productions	
2012	Casa de mi padre	Matt Piedmont	$6 million	$8.41 million	Lionsgate	with NALA Films and Pantelion Films	
2012	The Campaign	Jay Roach	$95 million	$104.9 million	Warner Bros. Pictures	with Everyman Pictures	
2012	Bachelorette	Leslye Headland	$3 million	$12.1 million	RADiUS-TWC	with BCDF Pictures	
2013	Hansel & Gretel: Witch Hunters	Tommy Wirkola	$50 million	$226.3 million	Paramount Pictures	with Flynn Picture Company, MTV Films, and Metro-Goldwyn-Mayer	
2013	Anchorman 2: The Legend Continues	Adam McKay	$50 million	$173.6 million	Paramount Pictures	with Apatow Productions	
2014	Tammy	Ben Falcone	$20 million (gross) $16.4 million (net)	$100.3 million	Warner Bros. Pictures	with On the Day Productions, RatPac-Dune Entertainment, and New Line Cinema	
2014	Welcome to Me	Shira Piven	N/A	$625,727	Alchemy	with Bron Studios	
2015	Get Hard	Etan Cohen	$40–44 million	$111.8 million	Warner Bros. Pictures	with RatPac-Dune Entertainment	
2015	A Deadly Adoption	Rachel Lee Goldenberg	N/A	N/A	Lifetime	with National Picture Show Entertainment and MarVista Entertainment	
2015	Daddy's Home	Sean Anders	$50 million	$242.8 million	Paramount Pictures	with Red Granite Pictures	
2016	The Boss	Ben Falcone	$29 million	$78.8 million	Universal Pictures	with On the Day Productions	
2017	The House	Andrew Jay Cohen	$40 million	$34.2 million	Warner Bros. Pictures	with Good Universe, Village Roadshow Pictures, and New Line Cinema	
2017	Daddy's Home 2	Sean Anders	$69 million	$180.6 million	Paramount Pictures		
2018	Ibiza	Alex Richanbach	N/A	N/A	Netflix	with Good Universe	
2018	Vice	Adam McKay	$60 million	$76.1 million	Annapurna Pictures	with Plan B Entertainment	
2018	Holmes & Watson	Etan Cohen	$42 million	$41.9 million	Sony Pictures Releasing	with Mimran Schur Pictures, Mosaic Media Group, and Columbia Pictures	
2020	Eurovision Song Contest: The Story of Fire Saga	David Dobkin	$35 million	N/A	Netflix	with Gloria Sanchez Productions and European Broadcasting Union	
2022	The Menu	Mark Mylod	$30 million	$79.6 million	Searchlight Pictures	with Hyperobject Industries; final film	

=== Television ===
Year	Title	Network	Notes	Ref.
2009–2013	Eastbound & Down	HBO	with Rough House Pictures and Enemy MIGs Productions	
2010–2011	Funny or Die Presents	HBO	with Apatow Productions and Funnyordie.com	
2010	Big Lake	Comedy Central	with Motron Productions and Lionsgate Television	
2011	Jon Benjamin Has a Van	Comedy Central	with The Little Guy, Abso Lutely Productions, and Funny or Die	
2013–2019	Drunk History	Comedy Central	with Konner Productions, Funny or Die, and Comedy Partners	
2014	Bad Judge	NBC	with Two Out Rally Productions and Universal Television	
2015	The Chris Gethard Show	Fusion	with No Cool Kids, AGI Entertainment, and Funny or Die	
2017–2021	No Activity	CBS All Access/Paramount+	with Jungle Entertainment, Flight School Studio, Funny or Die, and CBS Studios	
2018	LA to Vegas	Fox	with Briskets Big Yellow House, Steven Levitan Productions, and 20th Century Fox Television	
2018–2023	Succession	HBO	with Project Zeus, Hyperobject Industries, and HBO Entertainment	
2020–2022	Motherland: Fort Salem	Freeform	with Well Underway and Hyperobject Industries	
2020	Robbie	Comedy Central		
