= Minx (TV series) =

American comedy television series (2022–2023)

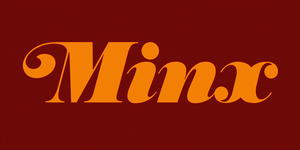
- Genre: Comedy
- Created by: Ellen Rapoport
- Starring: Ophelia Lovibond; Michael Angarano; Jessica Lowe; Oscar Montoya; Lennon Parham; Idara Victor; Jake Johnson
- Country of origin: United States
- Original language: English
- No. of seasons: 2
- No. of episodes: 18

Production
- Executive producers: Ellen Rapoport; Paul Feig; Dan Magnante; Rachel Lee Goldenberg (season 1); Ben Karlin
- Producers: Michelle Lankwarden (season 1); Sarah Labrie (season 2); Michele Greco (season 2)
- Cinematography: Quyen Tran; Jason Oldak; Blake McClure
- Editors: Julia Wong; Adam Burr; Rebekah Fridman; Tony Orcena; Arge O'Neal
- Camera setup: Single-camera
- Running time: 24–35 minutes
- Production companies: Rapoport Industries; Feigco Entertainment; Lionsgate Television

Original release
- Network: HBO Max
- Release: March 17 – April 14, 2022
- Network: Starz
- Release: July 21 – September 8, 2023

Minx is an American comedy television series created and written by Ellen Rapoport and starring Ophelia Lovibond and Jake Johnson for HBO Max and later Starz. It aired from March 17, 2022, to September 8, 2023.

In May 2022, the series was renewed for a second season. However, in December 2022, the series was canceled by HBO Max while its second season was in production. The following month, the series was picked up by Starz. The second season premiered on July 21, 2023. In January 2024, the series was canceled after two seasons.

== Premise ==
In the 1970s, a young feminist from Los Angeles joins forces with a shady adult entertainment publisher to create the first women's erotic magazine. Through this unlikely alliance the characters discover meaningful relationships in the most unusual places.

== Cast and characters ==
=== Main ===
- Ophelia Lovibond as Joyce Prigger
- Michael Angarano as Glenn (season 1)
- Jessica Lowe as Bambi
- Oscar Montoya as Richie
- Lennon Parham as Shelly
- Idara Victor as Tina
- Jake Johnson as Doug Renetti

=== Recurring ===
- Sofia Gonzalez as Rita
- Rich Sommer as Lenny
- Elizabeth Perkins as Constance (season 2)

=== Guest ===
- Taylor Zakhar Perez as Shane Brody (season 1)
- Stephen Tobolowsky as Conrad Ross (season 1)
- Amy Landecker as Bridget Westbury (season 1)
- Olivia Rose Keegan as Amber (season 1)
- Jacqi Vene as Marian (season 1)
- Austin Nichols as Billy Brunson (season 1)
- Lesli Margherita as Francesca (season 1)
- Al Sapienza as Vince (season 1)
- Alicia Hannah-Kim as Wendy Mah (season 1)
- Eric Edelstein as Willy (season 1)
- Samm Levine as Franco (season 1)
- Hope Davis as Victoria Hartnett (season 1)
- Josh Stamberg as George
- Gillian Jacobs as Maggie
- Susan Walters as Elayne (season 1)
- Allison Tolman as Wanda (season 1)
- David Paymer as Myron (season 1)
- Jaeden Bettencourt as Tommy (season 2)
- Erik Griffin as Chuck (season 2)
- Rose Bianco as Tia Sofia (season 2)
- Samantha Sloyan as Joan Didion (season 2)
- Ken Kirby as Kevin (season 2)
- Robert Alan Beuth as Cliff (season 2)
- Josh Fadem as Carl Sagan (season 2)
- Joshua Gomez as Simon (season 2)
- Caroline Arapoglou as Linda Ronstadt (season 2)
- Guy Burnet as Graham (season 2)
- Chris Riggi as Dustin (season 2)
- Robert Curtis Brown as Marshall (season 2)
- Beau Minniear as JJ (season 2)
- Cleo King as Evelyn (season 2)
- Jalen Gilbert as Marvin (season 2)
- Melinda Page Hamilton as Doreen (season 2)
- Katherine Landry as Frances (season 2)
- Che Tafari as Benjamin (season 2)
- Victor Webster as Charlie (season 2)
- Patrick Bristow as Walt (season 2)

== Episodes ==
=== Series overview ===
Season	Episodes	Originally released		
Season	Episodes	First released	Last released	Network
1	10	March 17, 2022	April 14, 2022	HBO Max
2	8	July 21, 2023	September 8, 2023	Starz

=== Season 1 (2022) ===
No. overall	No. in season	Title	Directed by	Written by	Original release date
1	1	"Not like a shvantz right in the face"	Rachel Lee Goldenberg	Ellen Rapoport	March 17, 2022
2	2	"Au revoir, le double dong"	Rachel Lee Goldenberg	Ellen Rapoport	March 17, 2022
3	3	"Norman Mailer, Samantha Shortcake"	Rachel Lee Goldenberg	Lara Spotts	March 24, 2022
4	4	"An exciting new chapter in the annals of erotica"	Jake Schreier	Ben Karlin	March 24, 2022
5	5	"Relaying news of a wayward snake"	Max Winkler	Annabel Oakes	March 31, 2022
6	6	"Mary had a little hysterectomy"	Carrie Brownstein	Julie Mandel-Folly	March 31, 2022
7	7	"God save the Queen of Dicks"	Craig Johnson	Mason Flink	April 7, 2022
8	8	"Oh, so you're the sun now? You're the giver of life?"	Rachel Lee Goldenberg	Ben Karlin	April 7, 2022
9	9	"A scintillating conversation about a lethal pesticide"	Natalia Leite	Kimberly Nicole Walker	April 14, 2022
10	10	"You happened to me"	Stella Meghie	Ellen Rapoport	April 14, 2022

=== Season 2 (2023) ===
No. overall	No. in season	Title	Directed by	Written by	Original release date	U.S. viewers (millions)
11	1	"The perils of being a wealthy widow"	Max Winkler	Ben Karlin	July 21, 2023	0.040
12	2	"I thought the bed was gonna fly"	Fernando Frias	Ellen Rapoport	July 28, 2023	0.060
13	3	"It's okay to like it"	Max Winkler	Joel Church-Cooper	August 4, 2023	0.043
14	4	"Life, Liberty and the Pursuit of Sexiness"	Anna Ramey Borden	Jessica Lamour	August 11, 2023	0.045
15	5	"A stately pleasure dome decree"	Shiri Appleby	Nora Winslow	August 18, 2023	0.051
16	6	"This is Our Zig"	Pete Chatmon	Sarah LaBrie	August 25, 2023	0.017
17	7	"God closes a door, opens a glory hole"	Rachel Lee Goldenberg	Mason Flink	September 1, 2023	0.053
18	8	"Woman of the Hour"	Ellen Rapoport	Chris Garcia & Emma Gase	September 8, 2023	0.033

== Production ==
=== Development ===
On February 19, 2020, it was announced that HBO Max had given the project a pilot order. Ellen Rapoport was attached to write as well as executive produce alongside Paul Feig and Dan Magnante of Feigco Entertainment. On September 3, 2020, Unpregnant director Rachel Lee Goldenberg was attached to direct and executive produce the pilot. On April 5, 2021, it was announced that HBO Max had given the project a series pickup for ten half-hour episodes. On May 5, 2022, HBO Max renewed the series for a second season. However, on December 12, 2022, HBO Max canceled the series. At the time, production on the second season was near completion, and Lionsgate sought to give the show a new home. Despite the cancellation, filming for the second season continued, with Lovibond later announcing that it had wrapped on December 18, 2022. On January 12, 2023, it was announced that the series had been picked up by Starz. On January 5, 2024, it was announced that the series had been cancelled after two seasons.

=== Casting ===
On September 16, 2020, Ophelia Lovibond was cast in the lead role. On December 8, 2020, Idara Victor, Oscar Montoya, Jessica Lowe, Lennon Parham, and Michael Angarano joined the main cast, with Jake Johnson cast in a guest role before being promoted to the main cast.

Taylor Zakhar Perez was cast as firefighter Shane. About the challenges he faced while playing the character, he said, "The biggest thing was grounding him, making him likable, and also playing against the line."

=== Filming ===
The pilot began filming on December 6, 2020, in Los Angeles.

== Release and streaming ==
The first season of Minx aired from March 17 to April 14, 2022 on HBO Max. Minx was renewed for a second season in May 2022. During the series’ final week of production in December 2022, HBO Max reversed their decision as part of the “cost-cutting tax write-offs” following the merger of Discovery, Inc. and WarnerMedia. In January 2023, Starz, the Lionsgate-owned premium network, picked up both the first season and the unaired second season of the period comedy.

The second season of Minx aired from July 21 to September 8, 2023 on Starz. The series was cancelled in January 2024.

In October 2025, Netflix acquired the license to stream Minx for their U.S. audience starting November 4.

== Reception ==
=== Critical response ===
On the review aggregator website Rotten Tomatoes, the first season holds a 98% approval rating based on 42 critic reviews. The website's critics consensus reads, "The rapport between Ophelia Lovibond and Jake Johnson is the irresistible centerfold of Minx, a bawdy and sharp comedy that merits a full-page spread." Metacritic, which uses a weighted average, assigned a score of 75 out of 100 based on 21 critics, indicating "generally favorable reviews".

The second season holds an approval rating of 88% with an average rating of 7.4/10, based on 25 critic reviews. The website's critics consensus reads, "Still getting great mileage from its marriage of the feminist and the frivolous, Minx's second season is smart, sexy, and fun." On Metacritic, the season has received a score of 76 out of 100 based on 14 critics, indicating "generally favorable reviews".

=== Accolades ===
Year	Award	Category	Nominee	Result	Ref.
2022	Venice TV Awards	Best Comedy Series	Minx	Won	
2023	Satellite Awards	Best Comedy or Musical Series	Minx	Nominated	
2023	Satellite Awards	Best Actress in a Comedy or Musical Series	Ophelia Lovibond	Nominated	
