= Princess and the Pony =

- DVD cover
- Directed by: Rachel Lee Goldenberg
- Written by: Bill Parker; Rachel Lee Goldenberg
- Produced by: David Michael Latt; David Rimawi; Paul Bales
- Starring: Fiona Perry; Bobbi Jo Lathan; Ron Hajak; Bill Oberst, Jr.
- Cinematography: Adam Silver
- Edited by: Bill Parker; Rachel Lee Goldenberg
- Music by: Chris Ridenhour
- Production company: The Asylum
- Distributed by: The Asylum Home Entertainment
- Release date: January 25, 2011
- Running time: 88 minutes
- Country: United States
- Language: English
- Budget: $17,000

Princess and the Pony (also known as 1st Furry Valentine) is a 2011 drama film by The Asylum.

== Plot ==
In order to protect her identity, young Princess Evelyn (Fiona Perry) is sent to live with distant relatives in America. She initially has difficulty adjusting to life in the town until she befriends a pony held captive by a shady carnival owner.

== Cast ==
- Fiona Perry as Princess Evelyn Cottington
- Bill Oberst Jr. as Theodore Snyder
- Bobbi Jo Lathan as Aunt Fay
- Ron Hajak as Lawrence
- Aubrey Wakeling as Fernando
- Alison Lees-Taylor as Velora
- Jonathan Nation as Sheriff Bartelbaum
- Olivia Stuck as Becky
- Kim Little as Queen Matilda
- Brian Ibsen as Roberts
- Michael William Arnold as Timmy
- Twinkie as Echo the Pony

== Reception ==
Common Sense Media gave the film one star and criticized it for having "a shocking amount of violence for a movie billed as "family entertainment."" In contrast, the Dove Foundation rated the film favorably and stated it was an "entertaining movie for the entire family" and gave it the Dove "Family-Approved" seal.

== See also ==
- List of films about horses
