= Ellen Rapoport =

American television writer/director

- Alma mater: Harvard Law School; Cornell University
- Occupation: Screenwriter
- Employer: Paul; Starz Entertainment
- Works: Desperados, Minx

Ellen Rapoport is an American television writer, producer, and director who created and executive produced the 2022 television comedy series Minx. Rapoport also wrote the screenplay for the 2020 movie Desperados.

== Early life ==
Rapoport grew up in the Midwest to immigrant parents.

== Education ==
Rapoport earned a bachelor's degree from Cornell University. Rapoport earned a Juris Doctor from Harvard Law School. In her third year of law school, Rapoport had to write a third-year paper, which was a one-hundred page legal thesis. She convinced her law school professor to let her write a legal drama for this assignment, which inspired her to start writing scripts.

== Career ==
After graduating from law school, Rapoport became a corporate lawyer at Paul, Weiss, Wharton & Garrison. She recalls disliking her job as a lawyer. Rapoport sold her first script while employed at the firm.

Rapoport created and executive produced The Starlet, a 2005 reality TV show. She also developed multiple television pilots, including "Puck Buddies" for Fox, "Hex Ed." for ABC Family and Sony, and "Legally Blonde" for MGM Television.

In 2009, Desperados got picked up by Universal, with Rapoport attached to write the script. In 2020, the film was released on Netflix.

Rapoport wrote for the 2021 film Clifford the Big Red Dog.

Rapoport is the creator of the critically acclaimed comedy series Minx. On February 19, 2020, HBO Max gave the project a pilot order, with Rapoport attached to write, as well as executive produce with Paul Feig and Dan Magnante. The show, along with Rapoport's writing, was positively reviewed by the public, holding a 97% rating on Rotten Tomatoes.

In 2022, Rapoport signed a deal with Lionsgate Television.
