= House of Spoils =

2024 horror film

- Release poster
- Directed by: Bridget Savage Cole; Danielle Krudy
- Written by: Bridget Savage Cole; Danielle Krudy
- Produced by: Jason Blum; Adam Hendricks; Greg Gilreath; Drew Houpt; Lucas Joaquin; Alex Scharfman
- Starring: Ariana DeBose; Barbie Ferreira; Arian Moayed
- Cinematography: Eric Lin
- Edited by: Marc Vives
- Music by: Jim Williams
- Production companies: Blumhouse Television; Divide/Conquer; Secret Engine
- Distributed by: Amazon MGM Studios
- Release dates: September 21, 2024 (Fantastic Fest); October 3, 2024 (United States)
- Running time: 101 minutes
- Country: United States
- Language: English

House of Spoils is a 2024 American supernatural horror film written and directed by Bridget Savage Cole and Danielle Krudy. It stars Ariana DeBose, Barbie Ferreira and Arian Moayed. It is produced by Jason Blum under his Blumhouse Television banner, Adam Hendricks and Greg Gilreath under their Divide/Conquer banner, and Drew Houpt, Alex Scharfman and Lucas Joaquin under their Secret Engine banner.

== Plot ==
Ambitious in her field, "Chef" leaves a mentorship under prestigious chef Marcello to take over a remote, dilapidated restaurant in hopes of creating a fine-dining establishment, backed by her business partner Andreas, who has secured investment capital. She gives up her apartment and begins living at the new restaurant. She was not Andreas' first choice. He had originally partnered with a chef named Magnus but does not detail his departure.

On the day of a menu tasting involving Andreas, his primary investor Toli, and restaurant critic Hiral, Chef finds her prepared foods spoiled, riddled with mold, and infested with insects. The on-site garden has also been destroyed by rabbits. She sends her local employee Alvin to find ingredients from specialty stores and markets, but he returns with low-quality ingredients from a grocery store, as all of her chosen vendors aren't open on Sunday. Despite these setbacks, Chef prepares a fine dining experience, which Toli is fond of but Hiral criticizes as unadventurous, lacking "voice." Andreas insists that Chef take on his friend Lucia as her sous chef.

Andreas soon reports that Toli wants her replaced. Chef insists she be given two weeks to redesign her menu. As Chef works to establish a more unique menu, she confronts Lucia over her fraudulent resume. Lucia blames sexist chefs who refused to advance her, but Chef remains hostile and critical of Lucia's technique.

Chef soon discovers a gated garden on the grounds of the restaurant, filled with unique and unidentifiable plants and herbs. She begins harvesting these plants and experimenting with them in her cooking with Lucia's assistance, fostering a more amicable relationship between them. They come to construct the menu around these local ingredients. Despite her increased enthusiasm, Chef has a number of unnerving experiences on the property, including sightings of its previous owner. Alvin tells her that the previous owner was widely purported to be a witch, who lured women into a coven that practiced human sacrifice. Chef and Alvin agree the property is haunted. Chef continues to have distressing encounters, hallucinations, and disturbing dreams. She later finds Magnus in the restaurant, apparently driven mad, chewing flesh off his own fingers. As an ambulance takes him away, Lucia dodges Chef's questions about what caused this sudden change in such a talented chef.

After Andreas approves of the new menu, Chef has another encounter with the spirit of the previous owner in a hidden chamber in the cellar filled with dried herbs and jarred reagents. She becomes convinced that it is the paranormal nature of the property that drove Magnus mad, and tears up the herb garden. On the day of the friends and family soft opening, Chef abruptly abandons the exotic menu. When Lucia protests, Chef insults her, and Lucia walks out. The soft open is a disaster. Chef begins hallucinating that all the freshly prepared food is rotting and moldy; she slices off the tip of her finger while preparing chives; a patron suffers an allergic reaction despite specifications made on the ticket; and Chef faints in the middle of the dining hall. Andreas reveals that Toli has backed out, and Andreas is struggling to bankroll the operation on his own.

On the eve of the grand opening, Andreas announces that Lucia will be the head chef and asks Chef to leave. He and Chef argue in the wine cellar, culminating with Chef threatening him with a crowbar, and Andreas locking her in. Chef attempts to escape through the hidden chamber but finds the exterior cellar door locked. The chamber begins to violently shake, exposing a hidden tunnel. Chef crawls through it but discovers a dead body within and in her panic to turn back, collapses the tunnel behind her. Chef has a vision that reveals the true nature of the previous owner. She was not a witch, but an herbalist and healer, who died attempting to dig herself an escape route from an angry mob. Chef uses the healer's trowel to dig her way to the surface, emerging in the herb garden. She has a peaceful encounter with the rabbit, but kills it and returns to the restaurant.

Back at the restaurant, the kitchen is struggling to serve the first course, and after Chef returns and makes a scene in the dining hall, a kitchen fire forces Andreas to evacuate the restaurant. He discovers Chef constructing a bonfire outside, and rebuilds the dining hall outdoors. With the help of Lucia and the rest of the kitchen staff, Chef builds a makeshift kitchen around the bonfire. Using the rabbit and plants from the healer's garden, they prepare a stew. Both Marcello and Hiral are impressed and moved by the dish. As diners and staff both celebrate this success, Chef has a moment of solitude and reflection, appreciating the work of her predecessor and embracing the legacy of this place.

== Cast ==
- Ariana DeBose as Chef
- Barbie Ferreira as Lucia
- Arian Moayed as Andreas
- Marton Csokas as Marcello
- Mikkel Bratt Silset as Erik Haas
- Amara Karan as Hiral Sen
- Gabriel Drake as Alvin

== Production ==
In August 2022, Amazon Studios and Blumhouse Television announced House of Spoils which is being written and directed by Bridget Savage Cole and Danielle Krudy with Ariana DeBose, Barbie Ferreira and Arian Moayed set to star. Principal photography on the film began in August 2022 in Hungary.

== Release ==
House of Spoils premiered at Fantastic Fest on September 21, 2024, before streaming on Amazon Prime Video on October 3.

== Reception ==
=== Critical response ===
On the review aggregator website Rotten Tomatoes, 40% of 31 critics' reviews are positive, with an average rating of 5.4/10. The website's consensus reads: "Whipping up promising ingredients and elegantly plating them, House of Spoils has the presentation down but ultimately delivers empty calories." Metacritic, which uses a weighted average, assigned the film a score of 42 out of 100, based on 5 critics, indicating "mixed or average" reviews.

Benjamin Lee of The Guardian awarded the film three out of five stars, commending Ariana DeBose for her "vivid screen presence." However, he was critical of the movie’s overall execution, remarking that "it works best when focusing on the challenges of opening a new restaurant, with the tension of designing a menu being far more terrifying than any malevolent spirit."

John Serba of Decider also praised Ariana DeBose's performance, noting that she imbues her character, Chef, with a "prickly sensibility" that complements her ambition. However, he criticized the screenplay for not fully supporting DeBose’s portrayal, stating that it "ultimately fails the actress by not fully fleshing out the character." Santanu Das of Hindustan Times commented, "[House of Spoils is] too distracted by its own choices to make any commentary about consumer culture. The finale leaves a laughably bad aftertaste. There is not enough meat here to chew, not enough texture in its construct to ponder upon, and far too few thrills that ultimately leave you hungry for more. No chef!"
