= Looking for Alaska =

2005 novel by John Green

- Looking for Alaska first edition cover
- Author: John Green
- Cover artist: Nolan Gadient
- Language: English
- Genre: Young adult novel
- Publisher: Dutton Juvenile
- Publication date: 2005
- Publication place: United States
- Media type: Print (hardback & paperback)
- Pages: 297
- ISBN: 0-525-47506-0
- OCLC: 55633822
- LC Class: PZ7.G8233 Lo 2005

Looking for Alaska is a 2005 young adult novel by American author John Green. Based on his time at the private Indian Springs School, Green wrote the novel in order to create meaningful young adult fiction. While he drew from people and events in his life, the novel is fictional.

Looking for Alaska follows the novel's main character and narrator Miles Halter, or "Pudge," to boarding school. He seeks a "Great Perhaps," as in the famous last words of French writer François Rabelais. Throughout the 'Before' section of the novel, Miles and his friends Chip "The Colonel" Martin, Alaska Young, and Takumi Hikohito grow very close.

In the second half of the novel, Miles and his friends work to discover the missing details of the night Alaska died. While struggling to reconcile Alaska's death, Miles grapples with the last words of Simón Bolívar and the meaning of life. The novel never provides a conclusion to these topics.

Looking for Alaska explores themes of the search for meaning, grief, hope, and youth–adult relationships. The novel won the 2006 Michael L. Printz Award from the American Library Association (ALA). In 2015 it led the association's list of most-challenged books, with profanity and a sexually explicit scene identified as objectionable. Between 2010 and 2019, the ALA said that it was the fourth-most challenged book in the United States. Schools in Kentucky, Tennessee, and several other states have attempted to place bans on the book. PEN America's 2024 report on instances of book bans in public schools found a total of 97 bans of Looking for Alaska from July 1, 2021 to June 30, 2024, making it the second most banned book in this timeframe – only 1 ban less than the most banned book, Jodi Picoult's Nineteen Minutes, with 98 bans in total.

In 2005, Paramount Pictures received the rights to produce a film adaptation of Looking for Alaska; however, the film failed to reach production. More than a decade later, the novel was adapted as a television miniseries of the same name, which premiered as a Hulu Original on October 18, 2019.

== Background ==
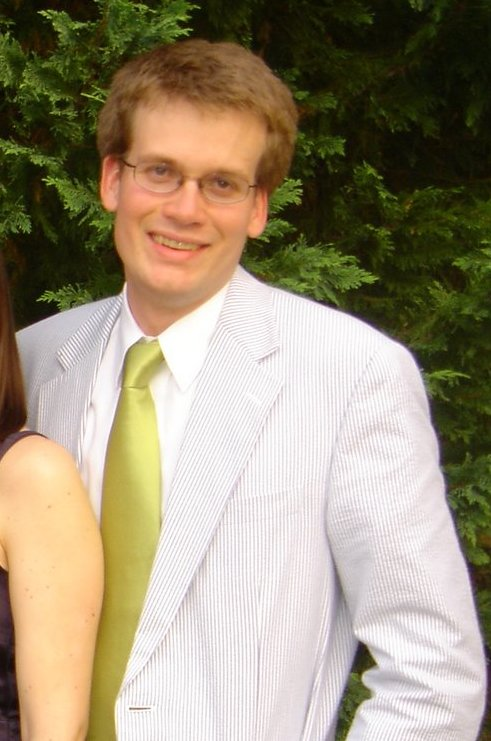
John Green, author of Looking for Alaska, in 2007

Looking for Alaska is based on John Green's early life. Growing up, Green always loved writing, but when it came to his middle school years, he classified his time as "pretty bleak". Green says that he was "unbearable" as a student to his parents and teachers; however, he always worked hard to fit in with his peers. Green's situation did not improve after his transition to high school, so he asked his parents if he could attend Indian Springs School, a private boarding school outside of Birmingham, Alabama. His parents agreed. He spent the remainder of his time in high school at Indian Springs School, where he formed valuable relationships with teachers. These have endured to today, he says.

Green's experience at boarding school inspired him to write Looking for Alaska. He drew from people and incidents he knew, including the death of a classmate.

During a book talk at Rivermont Collegiate on October 19, 2006, Green shared that Takumi's "fox hat" in Looking for Alaska was based on a Filipino friend who wore a similar hat while playing pranks at the school. Green created the possessed swan in Culver Creek from a similar swan he remembered at Indian Springs. While Green has said that two pranks in the book are similar to ones that he pulled, the novel is fictional.

As a child, Green became infatuated with famous last words, specifically those of President John Adams. He also collected and studied last words by other notable people, such as Emily Dickinson, Oscar Wilde, and Simón Bolívar. Green's main character Miles is given a similar fascination. He holds Bolivar's last words to inspire a search for meaning in the face of unexplained death.

== Plot ==
Miles Halter, a teenage boy obsessed with the last words of famous people, leaves his regular high school in Florida to attend Culver Creek Preparatory High School in Alabama for his junior year. Miles thinks about the change in the last words of writer François Rabelais: "I go to seek a Great Perhaps." Miles' new roommate, Chip "The Colonel" Martin, gives him the nickname "Pudge" and introduces the new boy to his friends: hip-hop MC Takumi Hikohito and Alaska Young, an intelligent, beautiful, and emotionally unstable girl. Learning of Pudge's obsession with famous last words, Alaska tells him that Simón Bolívar said: "Damn it. How will I ever get out of this labyrinth!" The two make a deal that if Pudge figures out what the labyrinth is and how to escape it, Alaska will find him a girlfriend. Later, Alaska sets Pudge up with Lara, a Romanian classmate.

Pudge and Lara have a disastrous date, but Alaska and Pudge grow closer, and he begins to fall in love with her. She insists on keeping their relationship platonic because she has a boyfriend at university.

On his first night at Culver Creek, Pudge is kidnapped, wrapped up and gagged with duct tape and thrown into a lake by the "Weekday Warriors," a group of rich schoolmates who blame the Colonel and his friends for the expulsion of their friend, Paul. Takumi claims that they are innocent because their friend Marya (Paul’s girlfriend) was also expelled during the incident. However, Alaska later admits to Miles that she had told on both Marya and Paul to the dean, Mr. Starnes, nicknamed "The Eagle", to save herself from being expelled.

The gang celebrates a successful series of pranks by drinking and partying, and an inebriated Alaska confides about her mother's death from an aneurysm when she was eight years old. Although she failed to understand it at the time, she feels guilty for not calling 911. Pudge figures that her mother's death made Alaska impulsive and rash. He concludes that the labyrinth was a person's suffering and that humans must try to find their way out. Afterward, Pudge grows closer to Lara, and they start dating. A week later, after another "celebration," an intoxicated Alaska and Pudge spend the night with each other. Soon, Alaska receives a phone call that causes her to be hysterical. Insisting that she has to leave, Alaska drives away while still drunk, and the Colonel and Pudge distract Mr. Starnes. They later learn that Alaska was driving under the influence and died.

The Colonel and Pudge are devastated, blame themselves, wonder about her reasons for undertaking the urgent drive, and even contemplate that she might have deliberately killed herself. The Colonel insists on questioning Jake, her boyfriend, but Pudge refuses, fearing that he might learn that Alaska never loved him. They argue, and the Colonel accuses Pudge of loving only an idealized Alaska he made up. Pudge realizes the truth and reconciles with the Colonel.

To celebrate Alaska's life, Pudge, the Colonel, Takumi, and Lara team up with the Weekday Warriors to hire a male stripper to speak at Culver's Speaker Day, a prank that Alaska had developed before her death. The whole school finds it hilarious; even Mr. Starnes acknowledges how clever it was. Pudge finds Alaska's copy of The General in His Labyrinth with the labyrinth quote underlined and notices the words "straight and fast" written in the margins. He remembers Alaska died on the morning after the anniversary of her mother's death and concludes that Alaska felt guilty for not visiting her mother's grave and, in her rush, might have been trying to reach the cemetery. On the last day of school, Takumi confesses in a note that he was the last person to see Alaska and let her go as well. Pudge realizes that letting her go no longer matters as much. He forgives Alaska for dying, as he knows Alaska forgives him for letting her go.

== Style ==
Looking for Alaska is divided into two halves named 'Before' and 'After' as in before and after Alaska's death, and are narrated by main character Miles Halter. Rather than the typical numerical system, each chapter is denoted through the number of days before Alaska's death or the number of days after. The genesis of this structure resulted from John Green's influence of public reactions to the September 11 attacks.

In an interview with Random House Publishing, Green recalled that newscasters stated that people would now view the world through the lens of either before or after 9/11. Green says in the same interview, “We look back to the most important moment in our history, and that becomes the dividing line between what we were and what we are now. So I wanted to reflect on the way we measure and think of time.” For the characters in Looking for Alaska, Alaska's death proved a life-altering moment, and Green wanted to reflect this importance by creating the structure of the novel around the axis of Alaska's death.

=== Genre ===
Looking for Alaska is classified as "young adult fiction". While Green used his own life as a source of inspiration, the novel itself is entirely fictional. In an interview with Random House Publishing, Green states that the intended audience for the novel is high-school students. In a separate interview, Green comments that he wrote the novel intending it to be young adult fiction because he wished to contribute to the formation of his readers’ values in a meaningful way. Furthermore, themes of sex, drugs, alcohol, first love, and loss classify the book as young adult fiction.

== Characters ==
Miles Halter ("Pudge")
Miles Halter is the novel's main character and narrator, who has an unusual passion in learning famous people's last words. He transfers to the boarding school Culver Creek in search of his own "Great Perhaps." He is nicknamed "Pudge" by his roommate because he is tall and skinny. Miles is attracted to Alaska Young, who mostly does not reciprocate his feelings. As seen through interactions with other characters, Miles can be categorized as independent and curious, but also unique.
Alaska Young
Alaska is a wild, unpredictable, beautiful, and enigmatic girl with a sad backstory who captures Miles' attention and heart. She acts as a confidante to her friends, frequently assisting them in personal matters, including providing them with cigarettes and alcohol. She is described as living in a "reckless world." After receiving an unknown call, Alaska dies in a car accident, and the second half of the novel focuses on uncovering the mystery from the night she died. At the end of the book, it is not confirmed whether her death was an accident or suicide.
Chip Martin ("The Colonel")
Chip "The Colonel" Martin is five feet tall but "built like a scale model of Adonis". He is Alaska's best friend and Miles' roommate. He is the strategic mastermind behind the schemes that Alaska concocts and is in charge of everyone's nicknames. Coming from a poor background, he is obsessed with loyalty and honor, especially towards his beloved mother, Dolores, who lives in a trailer.
Takumi Hikohito
Takumi is a gifted Japanese MC and hip-hop enthusiast and friend of Alaska and Chip. He often feels overlooked in the plans of Miles, Chip, and Alaska. Towards the end of the novel he returns to Japan.
Lara Buterskaya
Lara is a Romanian immigrant who is Alaska's friend and becomes Miles' girlfriend, ex-girlfriend, and eventually girlfriend again. She is described as having a mild accent.
Mr. Starnes
Mr. Starnes is the strict dean of students at Culver Creek, nicknamed "The Eagle" by the students. He is pranked by Miles, Chip, Alaska, Lara and Takumi multiple times throughout the novel.

== Themes ==
=== Search for meaning ===
After Alaska's death, Pudge and Colonel investigate the circumstances surrounding the traumatic event. While looking for answers, the boys are subconsciously dealing with their grief, and their obsession with finding answers transforms into a search for meaning. Pudge and Colonel want to find out the answers to certain questions surrounding Alaska's death, but in reality, they are enduring their own labyrinths of suffering, a concept central to the novel. When their theology teacher Mr. Hyde poses a question to his class about the meaning of life, Pudge takes this opportunity to write about it as a labyrinth of suffering. He accepts that it exists and admits that even though the tragic loss of Alaska created his own labyrinth of suffering, he continues to have faith in the "Great Perhaps," meaning that Pudge must search for meaning in his life even through inevitable grief and suffering. Barb Dean, a literary scholar at the University of Northern British Columbia, analyzes Pudge and the Colonel's quest for answers as they venture into finding deeper meaning in life. Because this investigation turns into something that is used to deal with the harsh reality of losing Alaska, it helps Pudge find his way through his own personal labyrinth of suffering and find deeper meaning to his life.

=== Grief ===
When Alaska dies unexpectedly, the repercussions in the lives of her friends are significant, especially for Pudge and the Colonel. Barb Dean concludes that it is normal to seek answers about what happened and why. She also points out that in writing Looking for Alaska, John Green wished to dive deeper into the grieving process by asking the question "how does one rationalize the harshness and messiness of life when one has, through stupid, thoughtless, and very human actions, contributed to that very harshness?" Pudge and the Colonel blame themselves for Alaska's death because they do not stop her from driving while intoxicated. Because of this, their grieving process consists of seeking answers surrounding her death since they feel that they are responsible. Ultimately, Miles is able to come to the conclusion that Alaska would forgive him for any fault of his in her death and thus his grief is resolved in a healthy way.

=== Coming of age ===
Throughout the book, the events that Miles and other characters experience are typical coming-of-age situations. Book reviews often note this theme, bringing up the instances in the book such as grief that cause the characters to look at life from a new and more mature perspective. Reviews also mention that the characters themselves resemble coming-of-age figures as they are relatable to readers going through similar experiences. Barb Dean also concludes that the characters grow up faster than expected while investigating Alaska's death because exploring the concept of the labyrinth of suffering is Miles' "rite of passage" into adulthood, and he learns more about himself through grieving for Alaska. Reviews also note activities such as drinking and smoking, which, though controversial, are often viewed as rites of passage by teenagers.

=== Hope ===
The theme of hope plays a major role in Looking for Alaska. Even though some of the novel's prominent themes are about death, grief and loss, Green ties hope into the end of the novel to solve Pudge's internal conflict that is incited by Alaska's death. In Barb Dean's writing about the novel, she examines Mr. Hyde's theology class, where he discusses the similarity of the idea of hope between the founding figures of Christianity, Islam, and Buddhism. Mr. Hyde also asks the class what their call for hope is, and Pudge decides his is his escape of his personal labyrinth of suffering. For Pudge, his call for hope is understanding the reality of suffering while also acknowledging that things like friendship and forgiveness can help diminish this suffering. Dean notes that Green has said that he writes fiction in order to "'keep that fragile strand of radical hope [alive], to build a fire in the darkness.'" In criticizing fundamentalist Christians, such as groups like Moms for Liberty, who seek to have his book banned from classrooms, Green mentions that this theme of “radical hope” is a Christian idea that he chose to write about due to his Christian faith.

=== Young–adult relationships ===
Looking for Alaska is a novel that exposes readers to the interpersonal relationships between the youth and adult characters in the novel. Green presents specific adult characters, like the dean of students called the Eagle by the students, whose main focus is to eliminate the rebellious tendencies of various students. On the contrary, certain characters, like Dr. Hyde, the school's religious studies teacher, express positive beliefs in his students, while still maintaining an authoritative role within the classroom environment. The relationship that exists between Dr. Hyde and his students illustrates how mutual respect can lead to positive interpersonal relationships between the youth and adults.

== Cover design ==
In August 2012, Green acknowledged that the extinguished candle on the cover is surrounded by "an improbable amount of smoke", and explained that the initial cover design did not feature the candle. Certain book chains were uncomfortable with displaying or selling a book with a cover that featured cigarette smoke, so the candle was added beneath the smoke. In the box set version of the book, released on October 25, 2012, the candle has been removed from the cover. Further paperback releases of the book also have the candle removed.

== Reception ==
Looking for Alaska has received both positive reviews and attempts at censorship in multiple school districts. Positive reviews include comments on the relatable high school characters and situations as well as more complex ideas such as how topics like grief are handled. Overall, many reviewers agree that this is a coming-of-age story that is appealing to both older and younger readers. Reviews also highlight the unique chronological structure of the novel, with each chapter divided as it leads to the climax of the plot. There has been much controversy surrounding the novel, however, especially in school settings. Parents and school administrators have questioned the novel's language, sexual content, and depiction of tobacco and alcohol use. In 2012, the book reached The New York Times Best Seller list for children's paperback. Looking for Alaska has been featured on the American Library Association's list of Frequently Challenged Books in 2012, 2013, 2015, 2016, 2022, and 2024 because it includes drugs, alcohol, and smoking; nudity; offensive language; it is also sexually explicit. The novel was awarded the Michael L. Printz award in 2006 and has also won praise from organizations such as the American Library Association, School Library Journal, and the Los Angeles Times among others.

=== Reviews and accolades ===
==== Reviews ====
Positive reviews of Looking for Alaska have been attributed to Green's honest portrayal of teenagers and first love. The novel's review in The Guardian describes the story's honesty, writing that "the beauty of the book is that it doesn't hide anything." Others cite Green's success as a result of his candidness in portraying death, loss, and grief. In a journal article titled "Although Adolescence Need Not be Violent...", scholars Mark A. Lewis and Robert Petrone comment on the novel's ability to portray loss in a format relatable to high-school readers. They write that many teenagers experience loss throughout adolescence and Green's portrayal of real characters aids in this relatability. Similarly, Jayme K. Barkdoll and Lisa Scherff wrote in The English Journal, "With each page Green builds more than simply a surface-level coming-of-age novel; he envelops his readers with a vivid collection of magnetic characters, beautiful settings, intriguing facts, and powerful dilemmas that provide readers with an authentic and unique window into the lives of teenagers struggling to make sense of themselves and the world around them."

Additionally, many educators and librarians recommend Looking for Alaska to their students because of the powerful themes it addresses. Don Gallo, English teacher and editor for the English Journal, wrote that Looking for Alaska is "the most sophisticated teen novel of the year."

==== Awards and accolades ====
Looking for Alaska has won and been nominated for several literary awards. The novel has also appeared on many library and newspaper recommended booklists. In 2006, Looking for Alaska won the Michael L. Printz Award, which is awarded by the American Library Association. The annual award honors the best Young Adult novel written each year. Additionally, Looking for Alaska was a finalist in 2005 for the Los Angeles Times Book Prize, which recognizes new and noteworthy writers. Looking for Alaska has been featured on the 2006 Top 10 Best Book for Young Adults, 2006 Teens' Top 10 Award, and 2006 Quick Pick for Reluctant Young Adult Readers. It has also been noted as a New York Public Library Book for the Teen Age, a Booklist Editor's Choice Pick, Barnes & Noble Discover Great New Writers Selection, and Borders Original Voices Selection.

=== Censorship in the United States ===
Looking for Alaska has frequently been challenged. Based on data collected by the American Library Association's Office for Intellectual Freedom (OIF), the book was the fourth-most banned, challenged, and/or removed book in the United States between 2010 and 2019. The book landed on the ALA's list of Top 10 Banned Books in 2012 (7), 2013 (7), 2015 (1), 2016 (6), 2022 (4), 2024 (6), and 2025 (8). The book has been deemed unsuitable for young adults because of its sexually explicit content, offensive language, and portrayals of drugs, alcohol, and smoking.

==== Knox and Sumner counties, Tennessee ====
In March 2012, The Knoxville Journal reported that a parent of a 15-year-old Karns High School student objected to the book's placement on the Honors and Advanced Placement classes' required reading lists for Knox County, Tennessee high schools on the grounds that its sex scene and its use of profanity rendered it pornography. Ultimately, students were kept from reading the novel as a whole, but Looking for Alaska was still available in libraries within the district. In May 2012, Sumner County in Tennessee also banned the teaching of Looking for Alaska. The school's spokesman argued that two pages of the novel included enough explicit content to ban the novel.

==== Depew High School, Buffalo, New York ====
Two teachers at Depew High School near Buffalo, New York, used the book for eleventh grade instruction in 2008. Looking for Alaska was challenged by parents for its sexual content and moral disagreements with the novel. Despite the teachers providing an alternate book, parents still argued for it to be removed from curriculum due to its inappropriate content such as offensive language, sexually explicit content, including a scene described as "pornographic", and references to homosexuality, drugs, alcohol, and smoking. The book was ultimately kept in the curriculum by the school board after a unanimous school board vote with the stipulation that the teachers of the 11th grade class give the parents the choice to have their children read an alternate book. Looking for Alaska was defended by the school district because they felt it dealt with themes relevant to students of that age, such as death, drinking and driving, and peer pressure.

==== West Ada School District, Idaho ====
In 2016, the West Ada School District in Meridian, Idaho removed Looking for Alaska from all of its middle school libraries. The school district found the content of the book to be too inappropriate for middle school students. The school district originally received a complaint from a parent on the grounds of the presence of foul language and mentions of actions like smoking and suicide. The district librarian looked into parental complaints along with reviews of the novel suggesting that it was best suited for high schoolers and made the decision to pull the book from the middle school library.

==== Marion County, Kentucky ====
In 2016 in Marion County, Kentucky, parents urged schools to drop it from the curriculum, referring to it as influencing students "to experiment with pornography, sex, drugs, alcohol and profanity." Although the teacher offered an opt-out book for the class, one parent still felt as though the book should be banned entirely and filed a formal complaint. After the challenge, students were given an alternate book for any parents who were not comfortable with their children reading the book. One parent still insisted on getting the book banned and filed a Request for Reconsideration on the basis that Looking for Alaska would tempt students to experiment with drugs, alcohol, and sex despite the decisions made after the challenge.

=== Author's response to censorship ===
Green defended his book on his YouTube channel, Vlogbrothers. The video, entitled "I Am Not A Pornographer", describes the Depew High School challenge of Looking for Alaska and his frustration at the description of his novel as pornography. Speaking of the choice to include an oral sex scene, Green said, "The whole reason that scene in question exists in Looking for Alaska is because I wanted to draw a contrast between that scene, when there is a lot of physical intimacy, but it is ultimately very emotionally empty, and the scene that immediately follows it, when there is not a serious physical interaction, but there's this intense emotional connection." Green argued that the controversy surrounding the novel is due to misunderstanding, and urged readers to understand the actual literary content of the novel before judging specific scenes. He also argued that groups of parents underestimate the intelligence of teenagers and their ability to analyze literature independently. He ended the video by encouraging his viewers to attend the Depew School Board hearing to support the choice of parents, students, and teachers to have Looking for Alaska included in public schools.

== Adaptations ==
The film rights to the novel were acquired by Paramount Pictures in 2005. The screenplay was potentially going to be written and directed by Josh Schwartz (creator of The O.C.), but due to a lack of interest by Paramount, the production was shelved indefinitely. Paramount later put the screenplay in review due to the success of the film adaptation of John Green's breakout novel, The Fault in Our Stars. On February 27, 2015, The Hollywood Reporter announced that Scott Neustadter and Michael H. Weber, screenwriters for Temple Hill Entertainment who had worked on adaptations for The Fault in Our Stars and Paper Towns, would be writing and executive producing for the film. The latest version of the screenplay was written by Sarah Polley, and Rebecca Thomas was set to direct. Green also confirmed that Neustadter and Weber were still involved with the film. In August 2015, it was announced filming would begin in the fall in Michigan. It was later announced that filming would begin in early 2016 because of lack of casting decisions. Later in 2016, Green announced in a Vlogbrothers video and on social media that the film adaptation had once again been shelved indefinitely. Green explained, "It has always fallen apart for one reason or another."

On May 9, 2018, it was announced that Hulu would be adapting the novel into an 8-episode limited series. On October 30, 2018, Green announced the lead cast: Kristine Froseth as Alaska, and Charlie Plummer as Miles.

Looking for Alaska (miniseries) premiered on October 18, 2019.

== Bibliography ==
- Green, John (December 28, 2006). Looking for Alaska. Penguin Young Readers Group. ISBN 9780142402511.
