= Denny Love =

American actor (born 1992)

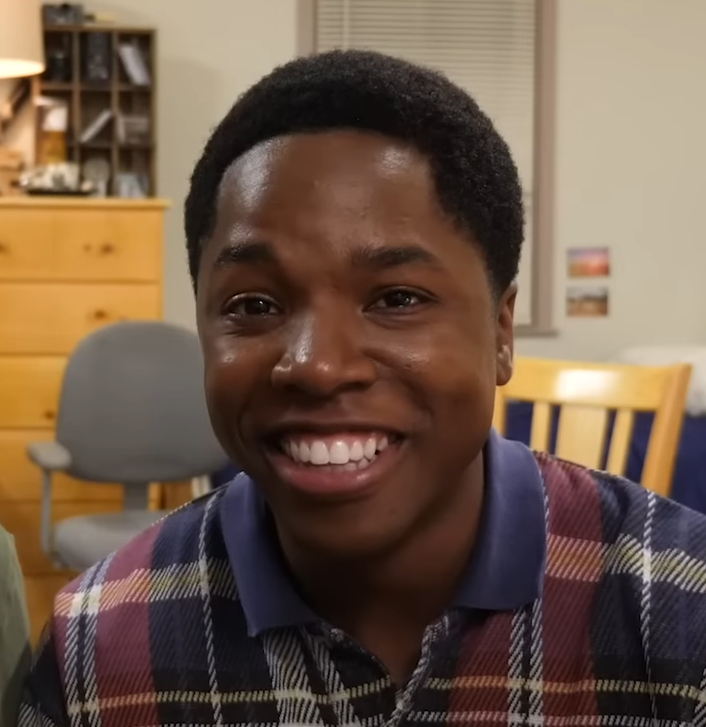
- Love in 2019
- Born: Denzel Irby; December 30, 1992 (age 33); Madison, Wisconsin, U.S.
- Education: DePaul University (BFA)
- Occupations: Actor, comedian
- Years active: 2007–present
- Known for: Mayor of Kingstown; Looking for Alaska

Denzel Irby (born December 30, 1992), known professionally as Denny Love, is an American actor and comedian. His biggest roles are Chip "The Colonel" Martin in Looking for Alaska (2019) and Kevin Jackson in Mayor of Kingstown (2024–2025). He also had minor roles on Chicago P.D. (2015), Empire (2016–2017), and Lucifer (2019), and appeared in the 2020 film Unpregnant.

He is from Madison, Wisconsin, and attended Madison West High School, then studied acting at The Theatre School at DePaul University, graduating in 2015. He is a former panelist of the YouTube comedy panel series The Kevin Langue Show, and in October 2026 co-launched Saturday Morning Detention, a weekly YouTube series with fellow comedians Aaron Branch and Herman Wrice.

He and his wife Amy married in 2026.

== Filmography ==
=== Film ===
| Year | Title | Role | Notes |
|---|---|---|---|
| 2020 | Unpregnant | Jarrod | |
| 2025 | Swiped | Hoodie Guy | |
| TBA | Miles & Juliette | James Moody | Filming |

=== Television ===
| Year | Title | Role | Notes |
|---|---|---|---|
| 2015 | Chicago P.D. | Marcus | Episode: "Get Back to Even" |
| 2016–2017 | Empire | Barry | 3 episodes |
| 2018 | The Neighborhood | Young Man | Episode: "Welcome to the Housewarming" |
| 2019 | Lucifer | Caleb Mayfield | Episode: "Super Bad Boyfriend" |
| 2019 | L.A.'s Finest | Dakari Adams | Episode: "Dangerous Minds" |
| 2019 | Looking for Alaska | Chip "The Colonel" Martin | Main cast; 8 episodes |
| 2021 | Kenan | Jordan | Episode: "Christmas Show" |
| 2024–2025 | Mayor of Kingstown | Kevin Jackson | Recurring cast; 13 episodes |
