= Desperados (film) =

2020 film directed by LP

- Promotional poster
- Directed by: LP
- Written by: Ellen Rapoport
- Produced by: Nathan Kahane; Erin Westerman; Kelli Konop; Mason Novick; John Finemore; Elizabeth Grave
- Starring: Nasim Pedrad; Anna Camp; Lamorne Morris; Sarah Burns; Jessica Chaffin; Toby Grey; Mo Gaffney; Izzy Diaz; Robbie Amell; Heather Graham; Jessica Lowe
- Cinematography: Tim Orr
- Edited by: Christian Hoffman
- Music by: Mateo Messina
- Production companies: Good Universe; MXN Entertainment; Lost City
- Distributed by: Netflix
- Release date: July 3, 2020
- Running time: 105 minutes
- Country: United States
- Language: English

Desperados is a 2020 American comedy film directed by LP, from a screenplay by Ellen Rapoport. It stars Nasim Pedrad, Lamorne Morris, Robbie Amell, Anna Camp, Heather Graham and Sarah Burns, and follows a group of friends who travel to Mexico in an effort to delete an email one of them sent to the man she has been dating for only a month.

The film was released on July 3, 2020, by Netflix, and received generally negative reviews from critics, who called it "predictable [and] unfunny".

== Plot ==
Wesley Darya is struggling to find a job and a partner and desperately wants to settle down. Immediately after leaving a blind date with a man named Sean, she meets Jared, a charming and attractive man who came to her aid after she tripped and fell on the sidewalk. Drawn to his looks and desperate to date him, Wesley starts to hide her true self to make the relationship work.

After dating for a month, Jared and Wesley finally have sex. When he does not contact her for five days, she becomes upset and suspicious that he has ghosted her. She gets drunk with her two best friends, Brooke and Kaylie, and the trio writes a long and insulting email to him. Jared calls Wesley to tell her that he had gotten into a serious accident in Mexico, without having checked his emails as his phone was in his resort room. To save her relationship, Wesley decides to go to Mexico with Brooke and Kaylie, sneak into Jared's resort room and delete the email.

After checking in, Wesley bumps into Sean at the same resort. She repeatedly tries and fails to gain access to Jared's room, and is eventually kicked out of the resort. When she tries to break in again, against her friends’ advice, she is caught and arrested. Sean, Brooke, and Kaylie come to pick her up, and he agrees to help Wesley delete the email before Jared is released from the hospital.

When Jared calls her to tell her he is being released early, Wesley decides to meet him at the Mexican airport and fly back with him, deleting the email on the flight. On the way to the airport, Sean tells Wesley that she had been his first and only date after the death of his wife, and that he is not planning on dating again. He had ended the date because he was not ready to move on from his wife. They bond over the drive, and Sean encourages her to tell Jared the truth.

On the plane, Wesley gains access to the email and is about to delete it when she decides to tell Jared the truth. After reading it, he breaks up with her for lying to him. After the plane lands, Wesley complains to her friends, but they accuse her of neglecting them during the trip. When she tells them her problems are more important than theirs, they end their friendship with her, leaving her at the airport.

Wesley later finds a job as a guidance counselor after Sean recommends her to one of his friends. She apologizes to her friends and they forgive her, after she admits her flaws and thanks them for always supporting her. Wesley tracks down Sean, who is at the same restaurant where they had gone on their blind date. She realizes he is on another blind date, and apologizes but confesses her feelings for him. He tells her that what they had in Mexico was too serious and is only interested in something casual.

Saddened, Wesley leaves the restaurant, but Sean rushes out to find her shortly after. He agrees to date her and they kiss on the street. Sean's date angrily walks past them, complaining on the phone to her mother about her terrible date.

== Cast ==
- Nasim Pedrad as Wesley Darya
- Anna Camp as Brooke, Wesley's best friend
- Sarah Burns as Kaylie, Wesley's best friend
- Robbie Amell as Jared
- Lamorne Morris as Sean McGuire
- Jessica Chaffin as Debbie
- Toby Grey as Nolan
- Mo Gaffney as Principal Judy
- Izzy Diaz as Quintano
- Heather Graham as Angel de la Paz
- Rodrigo Franco as Ramon
- Jessica Lowe as Ellen
- Mike Mitchell as Sweaty Beard

== Production ==
In November 2009, it was announced Universal Pictures had acquired distribution rights to the film, with Isla Fisher attached to star, with Ellen Rapoport writing the script. Mark Gordon and Jason Blum would serve as producers on the film. In March 2019, it was announced Anna Camp, Robbie Amell and Jason Mitchell had joined the cast of the film, with LP directing, John Finemore and Mason Novick producing under their MXN Entertainment and Lost City banners, respectively, with Gordon and Blum no longer attached and Netflix distributing. In May 2019, it was announced Jason Mitchell had been fired following sexual misconduct allegations and investigation conducted by Good Universe and Netflix, and was replaced by Lamorne Morris. That same month, it was announced Heather Graham and Sarah Burns had joined the cast of the film.

=== Filming ===
Principal photography began on April 19, 2019 in Mexico City.

== Release ==
Desperados was released on Netflix on July 3, 2020. In its first weekend it was the second-most streamed film on the site, then third-most in its second weekend.

== Reception ==
On review aggregator website Rotten Tomatoes, the film holds an approval rating of 15% based on 33 reviews, with an average rating of 3.7/10. The website's critics consensus reads: "Dumb, dated, desperate, and downright disappointing, Desperados squanders Nasim Pedrad's talents on gross-out gags that all too rarely land." On Metacritic, the film has a weighted average score of 41 out of 100, based on nine reviews, indicating "mixed or average" reviews.
