= The Knight Before Christmas =

2019 film by Monika Mitchell

- Official release poster
- Directed by: Monika Mitchell
- Written by: Cara J. Russell
- Produced by: Brad Krevoy; Vanessa Hudgens
- Starring: Vanessa Hudgens; Josh Whitehouse; Emmanuelle Chriqui
- Cinematography: Greg Gardiner
- Edited by: Lara Mazur
- Music by: Roger Bellon
- Production companies: MPCA; Brad Krevoy Productions
- Distributed by: Netflix
- Release date: November 21, 2019
- Running time: 92 minutes
- Country: United States
- Language: English

The Knight Before Christmas is a 2019 Christmas fantasy romantic comedy film directed by Monika Mitchell and written by Cara J. Russell. It was released on November 21, 2019.

Filming took place in Orillia and Bracebridge in Ontario, Canada between April and May 2019, with Norwich castle scenes featuring Charleville Castle in Tullamore, Ireland.

== Plot ==
In Norwich, England, on December 18, 1334, knight Sir Cole Christopher Fredrick Lyons and his brother Geoffrey participate in the annual Christmas hawking competition. Cole goes into the woods, while Geoffrey combs the castle for the hawk. Cole soon runs into an old crone named Kayela, whom he offers to escort to shelter. She thanks him for his kindness.

Kayala then tells Cole she will magically send him to a faraway land on a knightly quest, where he will see things like "flying steel dragons and horses" (airplanes and cars) and "magic boxes that make merry" (televisions). After her explanation, she gives him a glowing blue medallion. Cole is told that if he does not fulfill his quest before midnight on Christmas Eve, he will never be a true knight – but she does not explain the nature of the quest itself.

In the year 2019 on the same day in Bracebridge, a small city in Ohio, high school science teacher Brooke Winters. She is disillusioned by love, agrees to take her niece Claire to the opening of the "Christmas Castle", the same place Cole arrives in. Cole, confused by the new and unfamiliar surroundings, is accidentally hit by Brooke's car.

Cole is taken to the hospital, where Officer Stevens checks his background and assumes that he must have amnesia, as he has no ID and claims to be a medieval knight. Brooke offers to let him stay at her guest home while he recovers. Cole gradually acclimates to his new environment, discovering modern-day innovations such as radios, diners, TV, manners, and Alexa.

Despite his manner of speech and strange habits, Cole quickly endears himself to Brooke's friends and family. They find him strange, but humor him, as does Brooke herself, who even agrees that it is possible he is who he claims to be. She opens up to him about her late parents and an ex-boyfriend who had left her for someone else years ago, and he slowly shares his own past with her as they grow more familiar.

In his search for the quest given to him by Kayela, Cole ends up rescuing two children in danger on a frozen lake and catches an escaping pickpocket, but does not feel fulfilled. On December 24, Cole helps Brooke host a successful Christmas feast. Later, he asks her to clarify the mistletoe tradition, and they kiss.

Cole's medallion then lights up, meaning he has finally fulfilled his quest. Brooke walks Cole back to the Christmas Castle, where he had originally arrived, and they bid each other a heavy farewell. She returns home, heartbroken, while Cole is sent back to the 14th century.

On return, Cole discovers that he has arrived just in time for his brother's knighting ceremony. Geoffrey welcomes him back warmly, but soon recognizes his brother's unhappiness, so urges him to return to Brooke. He sets off back into the woods to look for the old crone, declaring that he has finished his quest. Kayela reappears, and uses her magic to transport him back to 2019.

On Christmas Day, Brooke is comforted by her sister, niece, and brother-in-law. They invite her to join them at the Christmas Castle, where Cole soon meets them, riding atop his horse Sherwyn. He declares his love to Brooke and his willingness to stay, which she happily accepts. The two mount Sherwyn and ride around the castle, admired by onlookers.

In a post-credits scene, Geoffrey meets the old crone, who greets him and asks for assistance the same way she did with Cole. She carries another medallion which glows as the scene comes to an end – indicating that Geoffrey will go through a quest like his brother.

== Cast ==
- Vanessa Hudgens as Brooke Winters
- Josh Whitehouse as Sir Cole Lyons of Norwich
- Emmanuelle Chriqui as Madison
- Harry Jarvis as Sir Geoffrey
- Ella Kenion as Kayela
- Arnold Pinnock as Officer Stevens
- Jean-Michel Le Gal as David
- Mimi Gianopulos as Alyson
- Jacob Soley as Patrick
- Andrea Senior as Caroler
- Simon Webster as Reed
- Jonah Wineberg as Older Brother
- Olivia Gudaniec as Kaelynn
- Isabelle Franca as Claire
- Shazdeh Kapadia as Lily
- Jesse Gervasi as Taylor
- Shanice Johnson as Paige
- Telysa Chandler as Group Singer
- Scott Ryan Yamamura as Evan

== Release ==
The Knight Before Christmas was released on November 21, 2019.

== Reception ==
On review aggregator website Rotten Tomatoes, the film holds an approval rating of 71% based on 21 reviews, and an average rating of 6.1/10. The website's critics consensus reads: "While its plot borders on the absurd, The Knight Before Christmas is endearing and charming enough to make it a worthy addition to the holiday rom-com genre."

== See also ==
- List of Christmas films
