= A Deadly Adoption =

2015 American TV movie

- Poster
- Genre: Satire; Drama; Thriller
- Screenplay by: Harper Steele (Note: Credited as Andrew Steele; Steele came out as transgender and changed her name in 2022.)
- Directed by: Rachel Lee Goldenberg
- Starring: Will Ferrell; Kristen Wiig; Jessica Lowndes
- Composer: MJ Mynarski
- Country of origin: United States
- Original language: English

Production
- Producers: Fritz Manger; Max Osswald; Adam Silver; Adam McKay
- Cinematography: Adam Silver
- Editor: Bill Parker
- Running time: 84 minutes
- Production companies: Gary Sanchez Productions; MarVista Entertainment; National Picture Show Entertainment

Original release
- Network: Lifetime
- Release: June 20, 2015

A Deadly Adoption is a 2015 American thriller drama television film directed by Rachel Lee Goldenberg (in her feature directorial debut) and written by Harper Steele.

It was described as a "deadpan parody of Lifetime Channel films" by critic Damon Wise. It stars comedians Will Ferrell and Kristen Wiig as a typical middle-class husband and wife, with Jessica Lowndes serving as the villain.

It was so deadpan that when it premiered on the Lifetime Channel on June 20, 2015, audiences failed to recognize that it was, in fact, satirical.

== Plot ==
Married couple Robert and Sarah Benson are parents of one-year-old daughter, Sully, and are expecting a second child. During Sully's first birthday party, Sarah accidentally falls into the lake behind their home when a dock railing breaks, causing her to suffer a miscarriage. Sarah is afterward unable to have more children as a result of the accident. Five years following the tragedy, Robert, a finance guru and best-selling author, is now a recovering alcoholic, reclusive and over-protective of Sully who is a type-1 diabetic. The Bensons plan adoption and invite expectant Bridgette Gibson to live with them, in anticipation of adopting her baby. Bridgette's motives, however, are quickly revealed. She rips the cover of a magazine depicting the Bensons such that Sarah's image is removed. Six year-old Sully discovers Bridgette's pregnant belly is fake, but Bridgette convinces the child she really is pregnant and not to disclose what she has seen. When Sully is nearly hit by a car while riding her bicycle due to Bridgette intentionally pushing her into traffic, it is revealed Bridgette has a boyfriend, Dwayne Tisdale. Bridgette, again, urges Sully not to disclose meeting Dwayne.

Robert discovers one of his books among Bridgette's belongings, which he autographed to a fan named "Joni," and realizes Bridgette is Joni, with whom he slept years before. Sully is kidnapped by Bridgette and Dwayne and taken to their cabin across the lake. Dwayne believes Sully is held for ransom. However, Bridgette desires to eliminate Sarah and have Robert and Sully for herself. Sarah's employee, Charlie, who works in Sarah's organic foods business, is shot and killed by Dwayne when he searches for Sully. Sully falls ill due to lack of insulin, forcing Bridgette to confront Robert and Sarah. A struggle ensues in which Bridgette shoots and wounds Robert; and, overpowers Sarah, trapping her in her running vehicle in the closed garage to appear she committed suicide via carbon monoxide poisoning. Robert recovers and rescues Sarah. Robert boards his boat and goes across the lake to a bridge which he knows Bridgette must cross to leave the area.

Driving Dwayne's truck with Sully next to her, Bridgette comes upon Robert standing in the middle of the bridge. Bridgette unsuccessfully tries to run over Robert and crashes the truck, disabling it. Sully runs to her father, but Bridgette threatens to shoot Robert unless Sully returns to her. Making her way toward Bridgette, Sully suddenly darts away and jumps off the bridge into the lake below. Robert does the same, avoiding Bridgette's gunfire. As Robert and Sully climb into the boat, Bridgette aims to fire at them. A shot is heard, striking Bridgette, which has come from Sarah standing behind her with a gun. Bridgette falls to her death below.

Six months later, the Benson family is restored and intact. Robert and Sarah dance in the kitchen with their daughter.

== Cast ==
- Will Ferrell as Robert Benson
- Kristen Wiig as Sarah Benson
- Jessica Lowndes as Bridgette Gibson/Joni Mathers
- Alyvia Alyn Lind as Sully Benson
- Jake Weary as Dwayne Tisdale
- Erik Palladino as Sheriff J. Moore
- Bryan Safi as Charlie
- Debra Christofferson as Ellen Macy
- Carolyn Hennesy as Debby
- Kellita Smith as Officer F. Mason
- Matt Corboy as Stan
- Brooke Lyons as Christine

== Production ==
On April 1, 2015, it was revealed that Will Ferrell, Kristen Wiig, and Jessica Lowndes were set to star in the film as a parody of the genre of Lifetime films, with Rachel Lee Goldenberg directing and Harper Steele writing the screenplay. Adam McKay's production company Gary Sanchez Productions and Ferrell are executive producing. The next day, Ferrell issued a statement regarding the film saying "We are deeply disappointed that our planned top-secret project was made public, Kristen and I have decided it is in the best interest for everyone to forgo the project entirely, and we thank Lifetime and all the people who were ready to help us make this film", shooting down the prospect of the film being released. However, in June 2015, a billboard for the film was spotted with a release date of June 20, 2015.

The premiere of the film coincides with the 25th anniversary of Lifetime's movie franchise.

According to James Franco, Ferrell revealed to him that he was inspired to do the project by Franco's guest starring stint on General Hospital. Franco would go on to say that Ferrell performing in the movie inspired him to helm a remake of the 1996 movie, Mother, May I Sleep with Danger?

== Reception ==
Joshua Alston of The A.V. Club gave the film a B−, commenting on the straight dramatic acting by the principals: "Everything about Adoption is right visually, and Ferrell and Wiig are close enough to where they should be tonally, but it's all a bit too earnest."

In an interview with Conan O'Brien, Ferrell explains that the joke lay in the absurdity of producing a straight Lifetime movie. Ferrell cites Rolling Stone, which Ferrell claimed understood the joke, while The New York Times had not. On Rotten Tomatoes, the film has an aggregate score of 14% based on 1 positive and 6 negative critic reviews.

== See also ==
- List of films featuring diabetes
