= Looking for Alaska (miniseries) =

2019 American teen drama TV miniseries

- Genre: Teen drama Tragedy
- Created by: Josh Schwartz
- Based on: Looking for Alaska by John Green
- Starring: Charlie Plummer; Kristine Froseth; Denny Love; Jay Lee; Sofia Vassilieva; Landry Bender; Uriah Shelton; Jordan Connor; Timothy Simons; Ron Cephas Jones
- Music by: Siddhartha Khosla
- Country of origin: United States
- Original language: English
- No. of episodes: 8

Production
- Executive producers: Josh Schwartz; Stephanie Savage; Marty Bowen; Wyck Godfrey; Isaac Klausner; John Green; Jessica Tuchinsky; Mark Waters; Sarah Adina Smith
- Producers: Samson Mücke; Mark Rowen; Kirk A. Moore
- Cinematography: Ramsey Nickell
- Editors: Matt Ramsey; Shoshanah Tanzer; Todd Gerlinger; Hillary P. Wills
- Running time: 48–57 minutes
- Production companies: Temple Hill Productions; Fake Empire; Paramount Television
- Budget: $57.1 million

Original release
- Network: Hulu
- Release: October 18, 2019

Looking for Alaska is an American teen drama television miniseries created by Josh Schwartz. It is based on the 2005 novel of the same name by John Green. After a film adaptation was repeatedly delayed at Paramount Pictures, Hulu finalized a deal and ordered an eight-episode limited series. It stars Charlie Plummer and Kristine Froseth in the two lead roles as Miles Halter and Alaska Young, respectively. The miniseries premiered on Hulu on October 18, 2019. It received acclaim from critics and fans of the book, with praise geared toward its writing, acting, and faithfulness to the source material.

== Premise ==
Looking For Alaska tells the story of a teenage boy named Miles Halter who is obsessed with famous last words and seeking "the Great Perhaps", a concept inspired by the last words of poet Francois Rabelais. This desire leads him to enroll at Culver Creek Academy in Alabama, hoping to find something less boring and safe than the life he's always lived and gain a deeper perspective on life. At Culver Creek, he befriends his roommate Chip "The Colonel" Martin, who introduces him to Alaska Young, whom he later falls in love with, and Takumi Hikohito. Throughout his "new life" at the school, Miles learns many lessons about life, love, and the art of letting go.

== Cast ==
=== Main ===
- Charlie Plummer as Miles "Pudge" Halter, a new high school junior at Culver Creek Academy from Orlando, Florida
- Kristine Froseth as Alaska Young, the girl who catches Pudge's eye when he arrives at Culver Creek Academy
- Denny Love as Chip "The Colonel" Martin, Pudge's roommate and friend
- Jay Lee as Takumi Hikohito, Alaska and The Colonel's best friend
- Sofia Vassilieva as Lara Buterskaya, a Romanian girl that Alaska sets up on a date with Pudge
- Landry Bender as Sara, The Colonel's girlfriend and later ex-girlfriend
- Uriah Shelton as Longwell Chase, one of the wealthy kids known as the Weekday Warriors as they were able to go home each weekend
- Jordan Connor as Kevin, a member of the Weekday Warriors
- Timothy Simons as Mr. Starnes, aka "The Eagle", the headmaster of Culver Creek Academy
- Ron Cephas Jones as Dr. Hyde, an elderly religions teacher at Culver Creek Academy

=== Recurring ===
- Meg Wright as Marya, Alaska's former roommate and best friend who gets expelled at the start of the new semester.
- Lucy Faust as Madame O'Malley, the French teacher at Culver Creek Academy
- Henry Zaga as Jake, Alaska's boyfriend who attends college
- Deneen Tyler as Dolores Martin, The Colonel's single mother

=== Guest ===
- Brandon Stanley as Paul, Marya's boyfriend who gets expelled at the start of the new semester
- Rachel Matthews as Fiona, Jake's best friend

== Episodes ==
No.	Title	Directed by	Written by	Original release date
1	"Famous Last Words"	Sarah Adina Smith	Josh Schwartz	October 18, 2019
In 2005, Miles Halter moves from Florida to Alabama to attend Culver Creek Academy, intending to seek his "Great Perhaps". He meets his roommate Chip "The Colonel" Martin, and is introduced to his new classmates, including Takumi and Alaska. The Colonel warns Miles about the "Weekday Warriors", a group of wealthy students at the academy, and Mr. "The Eagle" Starnes, the school's stern headmaster. Alaska's roommate Marya and her boyfriend Paul, a Weekday Warriors member, are both expelled after The Eagle finds them hooking up. Miles, obsessed with people's last words, makes a deal with Alaska that if he finds the answer to the question, "How do I get out of this Labyrinth?" she will get him laid. Refusing to take sides in the rivalry between the Warriors and The Colonel, Miles gets his limbs bound in plastic wrap, and is thrown into the lake during the night.
2	"Tell Them I Said Something..."	Rachel Lee Goldenberg	Josh Schwartz & Warren Hsu Leonard	October 18, 2019
The Colonel is invited to a country club ball by his girlfriend Sara. Miles, The Colonel, Takumi and Alaska agree to strike back against the Weekend Warriors, leading to a series of pranks played against both sides. As payback for a hair-dye prank, the Weekend Warriors destroy The Colonel's new suit. Alaska helps sew together another one and secretly infiltrates the ball with Takumi and Miles. The Eagle discovers Miles' involvement in the pranks and Miles chooses to face a hearing and risk expulsion to avoid ratting out his friends. Alaska agrees to a truce with the Weekend Warriors. At the hearing, the student jury gives Miles a light punishment thanks to a series of favors The Colonel, Takumi, and Alaska agreed to do for the jury members, including getting their classmate Lara a date with Miles.
3	"I've Never Felt Better..."	Brett Haley	Stephanie Savage & Ashley Wigfield	October 18, 2019
Alaska starts planning a group date so that Miles will finally go out with Lara. Takumi learns Paul and Marya will be visiting Culver Creek at an upcoming basketball game. Alaska's boyfriend Jake comes by for the date night. The date goes south when Miles is concussed and Marya accuses Alaska of being the rat. Sara becomes appalled by The Colonel taking Alaska's side, and breaks up with him. Takumi tells The Colonel that he'd seen Alaska leaving to The Eagle's house the day Paul and Marya were expelled. Alaska escapes Culver Creek with Jake but later leaves him, believing she isn't good enough. Returning to the school, Alaska is taken to The Eagle's house for leaving campus without permission, where she pleads with him to let her stay at Culver Creek.
4	"The Nourishment Is Palatable"	Ami Canaan Mann	Josh Schwartz & Kirk A. Moore	October 18, 2019
With The Colonel and Takumi avoiding her, Alaska asks Miles to stay with her at Culver Creek over Thanksgiving. By chance, Miles talks to Jake over the phone, discovering Alaska has broken off contact with him. The two loot the student dorms for alcohol and porn. After being asked about it by Miles, Alaska calls Jake and officially breaks up with him. After finding out the two are alone at school, The Colonel's mother Dolores invites them to their home for Thanksgiving. The group initially has a good time, but Miles' desire to sleep with Alaska and The Colonel's refusal to reconnect leaves Alaska more isolated than ever.
5	"I'll Show You That It Won't Shoot"	Clea DuVall	Leila Gerstein & Kendall Rogers	October 18, 2019
The Colonel is bothered by seeing that Sara is now dating Longwell. Miles tries to convince Lara to go to the school dance with him. During the night, the Weekend Warriors flood Alaska's dorm, destroying a large section of her Life's Library. Alaska, Takumi, and The Colonel reconcile and formulate a plan to sabotage the Warriors' college applications while everyone is at the dance. Miles is asked to be lookout, which nearly ruins his date with Lara. The Eagle nearly catches them, but Takumi and Miles set off fireworks to draw him away. After successfully pulling off the stunt, Alaska reveals how her mother died and admits to Miles that it's the reason why she's so unwilling to go home.
6	"We Are All Going"	Megan Griffiths	Warren Hsu Leonard & Ashley Wigfield	October 18, 2019
In a flashback, we see a young Alaska with her mother at the zoo where she teaches her that mommas are always needed. Miles and Lara move forward quickly with their relationship. Meanwhile, the Colonel must face the consequences of the group's pranks as the Warriors' parents threaten legal action against Culver Creek for the fraudulent applications. Lara and Miles fight over Miles' loyalty to his friends. Miles and Alaska stay with the Colonel during his last night at Culver Creek. While the Colonel sleeps off a drunken stupor, Miles and Alaska begin a game of truth-or-dare, culminating in Alaska confessing she had feelings for Miles and an intimate moment between the two. Both fall asleep, with Alaska saying "To be continued." Later in the night, a crying and still-drunk Alaska wakes both Miles and The Colonel, asking them to distract The Eagle so she can drive off campus. The boys comply and the episode ends with Alaska driving off into the dark.
7	"Now Comes the Mystery"	Rashaad Ernesto Green	Josh Schwartz & Stephanie Savage	October 18, 2019
The Eagle calls an assembly, notifying the school that Alaska Young left campus the previous night and died in a terrible accident. The accident is attributed to her intoxication. The characters try to piece together why Alaska died. During her funeral, the gang figures out that Alaska's ex-boyfriend Jake called her the night she died. They conclude that, during the call, she remembered their anniversary and, guilty over breaking up and making out with Miles, was driving to Jake to apologize when she got into the accident. This conclusion is brought into question as Miles and The Colonel see a line Alaska wrote in her copy of "The General and His Labyrinth", leading them to believe Alaska might have died by suicide.
8	"It's Very Beautiful Over There"	Josh Schwartz	Josh Schwartz	October 18, 2019
Miles, The Colonel, and Takumi continue investigating Alaska's death, now trying to determine whether or not she died by suicide. They realize that Alaska wasn't going to see Jake, but rather, to visit her mother's grave on the anniversary of her death. While they are still unable to answer the question of whether Alaska died by suicide, they are given a small measure of closure. Later, the friends plan and play a memorial prank for Alaska Young which amuses even the Eagle. The episode ends with Miles' narration on the uncertainty behind Alaska's death, on how everyone shared at least a little blame, and on how it is possible to forgive nonetheless.

== Production ==
=== Development ===
The film rights to the novel were acquired by Paramount Pictures in 2005 shortly before the novel was published. The screenplay was potentially going to be written and directed by Josh Schwartz (creator of The O.C.) but, due to a lack of interest by Paramount, the production had been shelved indefinitely. It had been reported that Paramount was putting the screenplay in review due to the success of the film adaptation of John Green's breakout novel, The Fault in Our Stars. On February 27, 2015, The Hollywood Reporter announced that Scott Neustadter and Michael H. Weber, screenwriters for Temple Hill Entertainment who had worked on adaptations for The Fault in Our Stars and Paper Towns, would be writing and executive producing for the film. Paramount was actively casting the latest version of the screenplay, which was written by Sarah Polley. Rebecca Thomas was set to direct. Green also confirmed that Neustadter and Weber were still involved with the film. In August 2015, it was announced filming would begin in the fall in Michigan. It was later announced that filming would begin in early 2016 because of lack of casting decisions. Later in 2016, Green announced in a Vlogbrothers video and on social media that the film adaptation had once again been shelved indefinitely. Green has voiced his frustration of the development process of the film adaptation over the years. He quoted, "It has always fallen apart for one reason or another." In May 2018, Hulu finalized a deal with Josh Schwartz and Stephanie Savage, and proceeded to order an eight-episode limited series based on the book. Schwartz served as executive producer and showrunner, while Savage served as executive producer alongside John Green, Jessica Tuchinsky, Mark Waters, Marty Bowen, and Isaac Klausner.

=== Casting ===
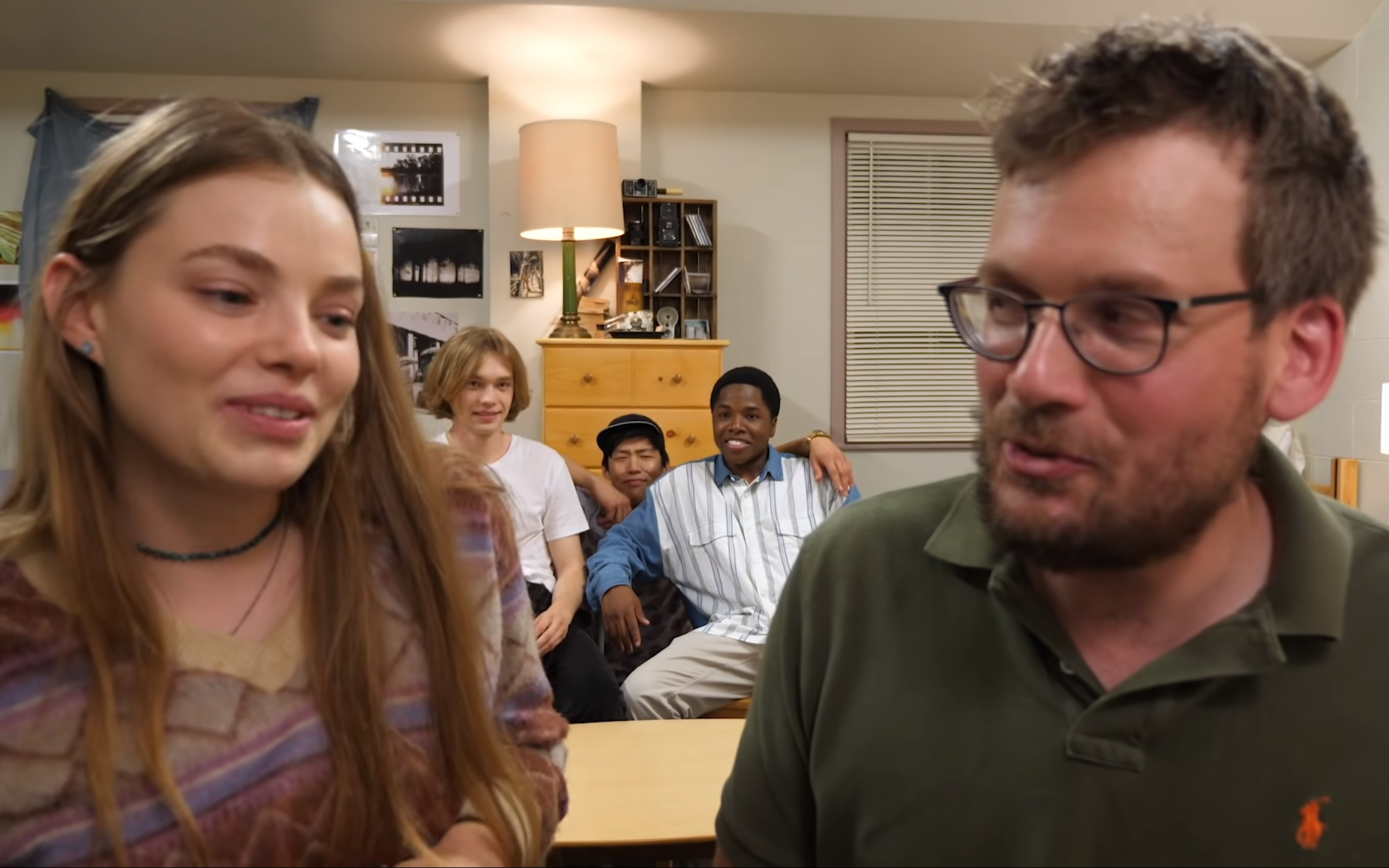
Cast and author (left to right): Kristine Froseth, Charlie Plummer, Jay Lee, Denny Love, and John Green, on Vlogbrothers in 2019

In October 2018, Charlie Plummer and Kristine Froseth were cast as the lead roles of the series, portraying Miles "Pudge" Halter and Alaska Young, respectively. In March 2019, Hulu announced six new cast members had joined the limited series; Denny Love, Jay Lee, Sofia Vassilieva, Landry Bender, Uriah Shelton, and Jordan Connor. The following month, Timothy Simons and Ron Cephas Jones were announced to join the cast as The Eagle and Dr. Hyde, respectively. In May 2019, it was reported that Rachel Matthews and Henry Zaga had been cast in recurring roles.

=== Filming locations ===
The series was primarily shot in Louisiana. Episode 1 offers a glimpse of the Piggly Wiggly in Independence. Miss Ann's Fast Food in Amite pops up occasionally. The "school" the kids attend is really Solomon Episcopal Conference Center in Loranger.

The Audubon Zoo's elephant sculpture shows up in Episode 6. The Mandeville end of the Lake Pontchartrain Causeway approach crops up in Episode 7. The Abita Springs Town Hall plays a police station in Episode 8.

=== Distribution ===
In April 2020, Looking for Alaska was released in Canada on CBC Gem. In the UK, the series was available on BBC iPlayer from 19 October 2019.

=== Music ===
Looking for Alaska (Music from the Original Series)

Soundtrack album / Compilation by various artists
- Released: October 18, 2019
- Length: 55:23

The soundtrack album for the miniseries, titled Looking for Alaska (Music from the Original Series), was released digitally on October 18, 2019, via Paramount and Sony Music Entertainment. It is a compilation album that consists of songs used in the miniseries.

Looking for Alaska (Music from the Original Series) track listing
No.	Title	Artist(s)	Length
1.	"So Here We Are"	Bloc Party	3:51
2.	"I Will Follow You into the Dark (Death Cab For Cutie cover)"	Miya Folick	3:53
3.	"Ask Me Anything"	The Strokes	3:09
4.	"To Be Alone with You (Sufjan Stevens cover)"	Fleurie	2:53
5.	"Crosses"	José González	2:41
6.	"Orange Sky (Alexi Murdoch cover)"	Kat Cunning	4:58
7.	"Macarena (Los Del Rio Bayside Boys cover)"	BEGINNERS	3:25
8.	"With Arms Outstretched"	Rilo Kiley	3:42
9.	"Salvation (Black Rebel Motorcycle Club cover)"	BAILEN	3:52
10.	"The Skin of My Yellow Country Teeth"	Clap Your Hands Say Yeah	5:45
11.	"Take Me Out (Franz Ferdinand cover)"	Young Summer	3:38
12.	"An Honest Mistake (the Bravery cover)"	Mating Ritual featuring Lizzy Land	3:48
13.	"The World at Large"	Modest Mouse	4:32
14.	"Looking for Alaska Score Suite"	Siddhartha Khosla	5:10
Total length:			55:23

== Reception ==
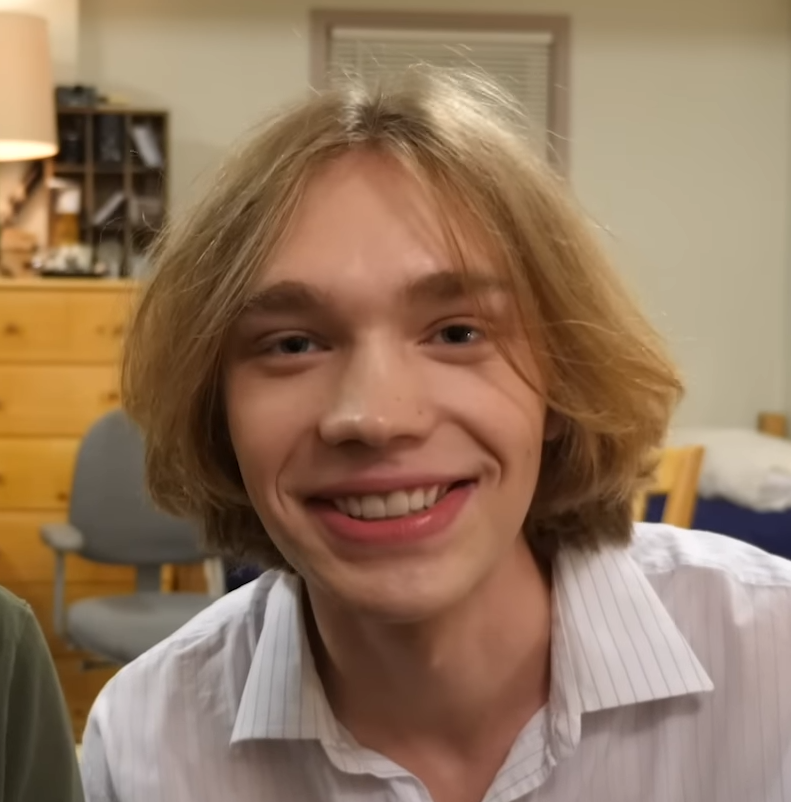
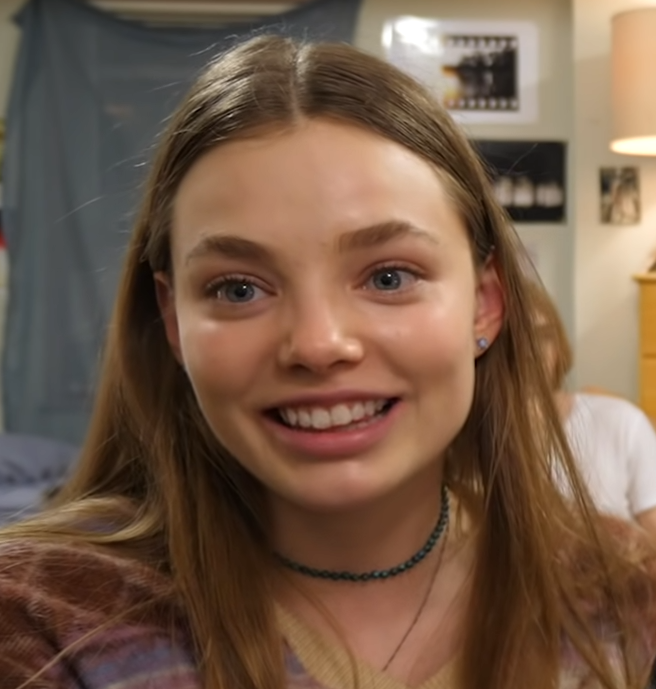
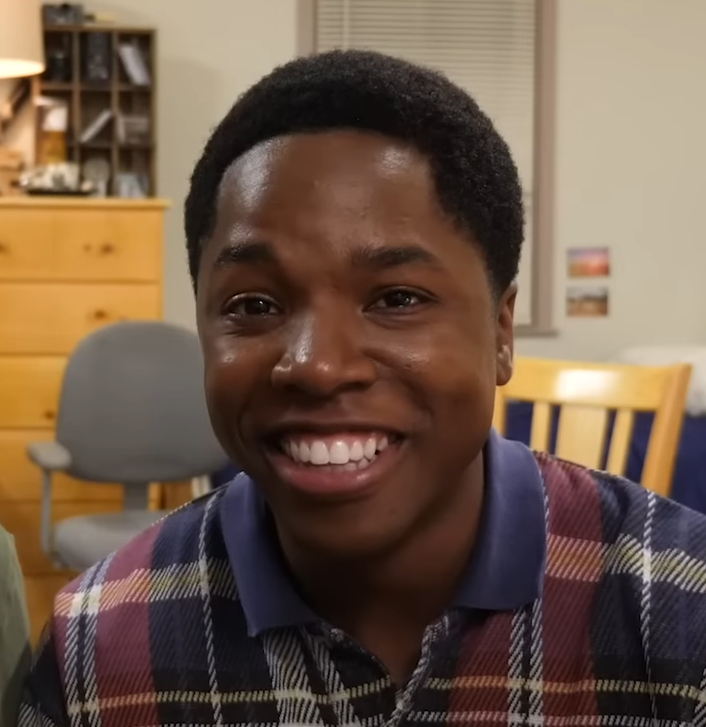
The performances of Charlie Plummer, Kristine Froseth and Denny Love garnered critical acclaim.

Looking For Alaska was praised for its writing, performances (particularly from Plummer, Froseth, and Love), visuals, soundtrack, directing, and improvements upon its source material. On review aggregator Rotten Tomatoes, the miniseries holds an approval rating of 91% based on 36 reviews, with an average rating of 8.5/10. The website's critical consensus reads, "Bittersweet and beautifully performed, Looking for Alaska is the rare adaptation that deviates from its source material only to find something even better." On Metacritic, it has a weighted average score of 72 out of 100, based on 10 critics.

Kathryn VanArendonk of Vulture called it a "rare adaptation that dismantles the original in order to build something that works better" and praised Love's charismatic performance as The Colonel. IndieWire's LaToya Ferguson graded the miniseries with an "A" and said, "Looking For Alaska is your standard, tried and true, coming-of-age story. And for that, it stands out from the rest." She also praised Plummer's performance as Miles, saying that he "captures the milquetoast nature of the character (both the funny and frustrating aspects of that), while also finding a way to make your heart break for him." The Guardian's writer Rebecca Nicholson gave the miniseries three out of five, and called the performances of the young cast "excellent" and Emmy-worthy, and further praising the characterization of The Colonel.

Alan Sepinwall of Rolling Stone gave the miniseries four stars out of five and said, "It's a familiar coming-of-age story, but one executed at a high level and with far more thought than usual given to all the kids who were forced to grow up long before the main character has to." He also praised the cast as "exceedingly charming" and singling out the performances of Froseth and Love. Variety's Caroline Framke also praised the cast, in particular Froseth's performance as Alaska, saying that "As Alaska, she has to portray a character alternately depicted as mysterious and vulnerable, flinty and fragile, wildly intelligent and crushingly naive. The series and Froseth take great and obvious pains to flesh Alaska out beyond the basic role of Miles' first love, which could so easily flatten her into nothing at all." Petrana Radulovic of Polygon summarized the miniseries as "a messy, raw depiction of grief — ultimately, what the book was supposed to be about, and what the show captures better" and called Froseth's performance "brilliant". Daniel Fienberg of The Hollywood Reporter praised the performances of Froseth and Plummer, calling the former "a marvel" and highlighting the latter's ability to nail "a tougher task" for playing Miles successfully.
