= Modern Life Is Rubbish (film) =

- Directed by: Daniel Jerome Gill
- Screenplay by: Philip Gawthorne
- Produced by: Dominic Norris
- Starring: Josh Whitehouse; Freya Mavor
- Cinematography: Tim Sidell
- Edited by: Peter Christelis
- Music by: Orlando Roberton
- Production companies: Serotonin Films; Modern Life Pictures; Piccadilly Pictures
- Release date: 22 June 2017 (EIFF)
- Running time: 105 minutes
- Country: United Kingdom
- Language: English

Modern Life Is Rubbish is a 2017 British romantic comedy film directed by Daniel Jerome Gill, written by Philip Gawthorne, based on Gawthorne's 2009 short film of the same name and starring Josh Whitehouse alongside Freya Mavor.

== Cast ==
- Josh Whitehouse as Liam
- Freya Mavor as Natalie
- Will Merrick as Ollie
- Matt Milne as Gus
- Tom Riley as Adrian
- Daisy Bevan as Layla
- Jessie Cave as Kerry
- Sorcha Cusack as Mary
- Steven Mackintosh as Lenny
- Ian Hart as The Curve
