= Barbie Ferreira =

American actress and model (born 1996)

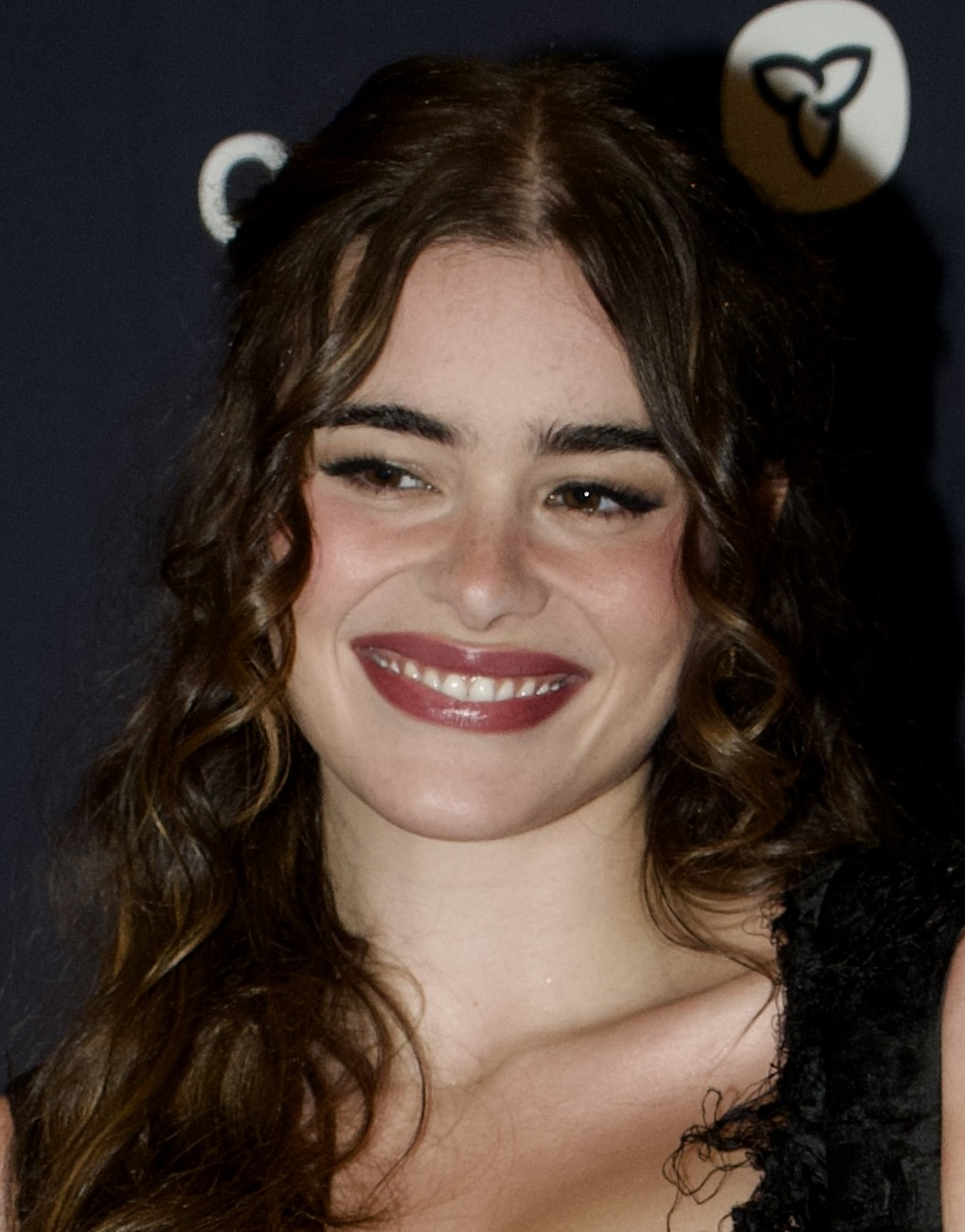
- Ferreira in 2025
- Born: Barbara Seppe Ferreira; December 14, 1996 (age 29); Manhattan, New York City, U.S.
- Occupations: Actress; model
- Years active: 2016–present

Barbara Seppe Ferreira (Brazilian Portuguese: [feˈʁejɾɐ]; born December 14, 1996) is an American actress and model. She is best known for her role as Kat Hernandez in the HBO series Euphoria.

== Early life ==
Ferreira was born on December 14, 1996, in Spanish Harlem, Manhattan, in New York City. She spent her early years in Queens, and later moved to Maywood, New Jersey. She is of Brazilian descent, and was raised by her mother, aunt, and grandmother. Her mother and aunt are chefs. Ferreira has said she was raised "kind of Catholic, kind of not. 'New York Catholic,' as my friend calls it—it's where you go to church sometimes, but we don't adhere to a lot of the rules." She attended Hackensack High School in Hackensack, New Jersey.

Ferreira previously ran a Tumblr account under the handle @barbienox.

== Career ==
=== Modeling ===
As a teenager, Ferreira began her career by sending her plus-sized modeling photos to an American Apparel open casting call. She has since modeled for brands including Aerie, Adidas, Asos, Forever 21, H&M, Missguided, and Target. Unretouched photos and a video interview from Ferreira's Aerie campaign went viral in 2016. Later that year, Time included her on its "30 Most Influential Teens" list.

=== Acting ===
Ferreira starred in How to Behave, a 10-episode Vice web series about etiquette, for which she won a Webby Award for Best Web Personality/Host. She also starred in the Teen Vogue web series Body Party, about body positivity.

Ferreira played Ella in two episodes of the HBO series Divorce and was among the ensemble stars of the HBO series Euphoria in its first two seasons (2019–2022), playing high-schooler Kat. She made her film debut in Unpregnant (2020) for HBO Max and had a small role in Jordan Peele's Nope (2022).

In August 2022, Ferreira announced she would not return to Euphoria for its third season. It was rumored that this was because she had disagreements with series creator Sam Levinson, but in a 2023 interview, Ferreira denied that, saying the rumors were pulled out of "thin air".

On August 11, 2022, it was announced that Ferreira would star alongside Ariana DeBose in the psychological thriller House of Spoils; the film began streaming on Amazon Prime Video on October 3, 2024.

== Personal life ==
Ferreira identifies as queer. She previously dated artist Gus Dapperton and musician Elle Puckett.

== Filmography ==
=== Film ===
Year	Title	Role	Notes
2020	Unpregnant	Bailey Butler	
2022	Nope	Nessie Leslie	
2024	Bob Trevino Likes It	Lily Trevino	Also executive producer
2024	House of Spoils	Lucia	
2025	Mile End Kicks	Grace Pine	Also executive producer
2026	Faces of Death	Margot Romero	
TBA	Wrong Number †	Eliza	In production

=== Television ===
Year	Title	Role	Notes
2018	Divorce	Ella	2 episodes
2019–2022	Euphoria	Kat Hernandez	Main role (seasons 1–2)
2022	The Afterparty	Willow	Episode: "Danner"
2025	Victoria's Secret Fashion Show	Herself	Television special

=== Stage ===
Year	Title	Role	Venue	Ref.
2024	Cult of Love	Lauren Montgomery	Broadway, Helen Hayes Theatre	

=== Music videos ===
==== Guest appearances ====
Year	Title	Artist	Director
2016	"Boy Problems"	Carly Rae Jepsen	Petra Collins
2017	"Prune, You Talk Funny"	Gus Dapperton	Matthew Dillon Cohen

==== Director ====
Year	Title	Artist
2018	"So Cool"	Dounia

== Accolades ==
Award	Year	Category	Work	Result	Ref.
Imagen Awards	2021	Best Actress – Television (Comedy)	Unpregnant	Won	
Imagen Awards	2025	Best Actress	Bob Trevino Likes It	Won	
Queerty Awards	2020	TV Performance	Euphoria	Nominated	
Vancouver Film Critics Circle	2025	Best Actress in a Canadian Film	Mile End Kicks	Nominated	
