= National Picture Show Entertainment =

National Picture Show
- Company type: Independent
- Industry: Film and TV Production Company
- Founded: 2012
- Headquarters: Santa Monica, California, United States
- Key people: Fritz Manger (partner); Adam Silver (partner); Max Osswald (partner)
- Website: www.nationalpictureshow.com

National Picture Show is an independent film and television production company based in Santa Monica, California. The company works in all areas of digital workflow, from feature films and television programs to brand integration, web series, documentary and interactive.

National Picture Show has produced film and television projects with Oscar and Emmy-nominated talent including the Lifetime movie, A Deadly Adoption starring Will Ferrell and Kristen Wiig and the web series You're Eating It Wrong with Dan Pashman, which was nominated for a James Beard Foundation Award. Other credits include the found footage feature, Re-Cut, which was directed by Fritz Manger and premiered at the Austin Film Festival and Classy Ladies with Alie Ward and Georgia Hardstark on the Cooking Channel.

National Picture Show's clients include Cooking Channel, Original Media, Best Buy, Syfy, Lifetime, Lionsgate, Funny or Die, Hello Giggles, Google, and Food Network, among others.
