= Unpregnant =

2020 film by Rachel Lee Goldenberg

- Official release poster
- Directed by: Rachel Lee Goldenberg
- Screenplay by: Rachel Lee Goldenberg; Ted Caplan; Jenni Hendriks; Jennifer Kaytin Robinson; William Parker
- Based on: Unpregnant by Ted Caplan; Jenni Hendricks
- Produced by: Greg Berlanti; Erik Feig; Sarah Schechter
- Starring: Haley Lu Richardson; Barbie Ferreira; Alex MacNicoll; Breckin Meyer; Giancarlo Esposito; Sugar Lyn Beard; Betty Who; Mary McCormack; Denny Love; Ramona Young; Kara Royster
- Cinematography: Doug Emmett
- Edited by: Julia Wong
- Music by: Roger Neill
- Production companies: Warner Max; Picturestart; Berlanti-Schechter Films
- Distributed by: Warner Bros. Pictures
- Release date: September 10, 2020
- Running time: 104 minutes
- Country: United States
- Language: English

Unpregnant is a 2020 American female buddy road comedy-drama film co-written and directed by Rachel Lee Goldenberg, based on the novel of the same name by Ted Caplan and Jenni Hendriks. It stars Haley Lu Richardson and Barbie Ferreira, with Alex MacNicoll, Breckin Meyer, Giancarlo Esposito, Sugar Lyn Beard, and Betty Who.

The film follows a pregnant teenager, Veronica (Richardson), who discovers that she cannot get an abortion in her home state of Missouri without her parents' permission and subsequently convinces her former friend Bailey (Ferreira) to take a road trip with her to Albuquerque so she can get one there.

It was released on September 10, 2020, by HBO Max.

== Plot ==
Seventeen-year-old Veronica Clarke takes a pregnancy test at school and is interrupted by her former best friend, Bailey Butler, who sees that the test is positive. Initially, not knowing whose it is, Bailey offers to give a ride to a clinic where she can get an abortion if she needs one. Then, she assumes Veronica will be keeping the baby, subsequently disposing of the test.

Veronica decides to get an abortion and then discovers it is forbidden in Missouri without parental consent. She quickly formulates a plan to get to Albuquerque, New Mexico, where clinics will perform abortions without parental involvement, but lacks the funds to make it all the way. Meeting with her boyfriend Kevin, she is shocked when he reacts to the pregnancy news by proposing. He also confesses he realized the condom had broken. Veronica pretends she will consider the proposal, taking the ring with her. She then goes to Bailey, who agrees to drive her to Albuquerque.

At their first stop, Veronica tries to pawn her engagement ring and is stopped by Kevin, who has been following her. Learning that Veronica needs the money for an abortion, the sympathetic pawnshop broker agrees to buy her ring. Veronica and Bailey head to Texas, though they fight over their former friendship, which Bailey fails to realize is because Bailey's father was ashamed of her nerdy pursuits as a child.

While stopping at a diner, Bailey is frightened by the arrival of local sheriffs. She reveals that the Firebird they are driving belongs to her mother's boyfriend. The girls escape detection when a fellow patron named Jarrod creates a scene. Jarrod later gives them a lift, introducing them to Matthews, a race car driver, who offers to drop them off at the closest bus station. Matthews turns out to be a woman (Kira), whom Bailey is immediately attracted to. Bailey then reveals she's a lesbian and later has her first kiss with Kira.

Before Kira can drive them to the station, a young couple, overhearing their need for a ride to Albuquerque for the abortion, offers to drive them all the way.

Bailey and Veronica wake up in the morning at the couple's house, where they discover that the couple is actually pro-lifers trying to stop Veronica from having the abortion. They manage to escape the pro-lifers by stealing their GMC Yukon and faking their own deaths.

Arriving at the nearest bus station, they discover it is out of order but stumble across a mechanic shop run by anti-government survivalist Bob. Hearing Veronica needs an abortion, he agrees to drive her to the clinic in an old Lincoln limo. During the ride, Veronica's friends call and urge her to say the pregnancy test belongs to Bailey. Wanting to protect herself, Veronica agrees that Bailey is the most likely suspect. Bailey overhears, triggering a fight between them about the dissolution of their friendship. Bailey leaves while Veronica continues to her appointment. When Veronica realizes Bailey has gone to see her estranged father, she reschedules the appointment and follows Bailey. Arriving at a flower shop Bailey's father works in, Veronica witnesses their awkward reunion and comes to Bailey's defense when her father treats her coldly.

At the clinic, Kevin surprises them and threatens to tell everyone about the abortion unless Veronica stays with him, but she tells him to go ahead and do it. After the abortion, they realize they have no more cash and make calls to their respective mothers, who get them plane tickets home. At home, Veronica's mother admits to being confused by her decision but reiterates her love for her daughter.

At school the next day, Veronica learns that Kevin never revealed her abortion to her friends, but she decides to tell them anyway. She also decides to continue her friendship with Bailey and goes to sit with her at lunch. Some time later, the two go on another road trip to Roswell, New Mexico.

== Cast ==
- Haley Lu Richardson as Veronica Clarke
  - Marie Wagenman as Young Veronica Clarke
- Barbie Ferreira as Bailey Butler
  - Sydney Gariety as Young Bailey Butler
- Alex MacNicoll as Kevin
- Breckin Meyer as Mark
- Giancarlo Esposito as Bob
- Sugar Lyn Beard as Kate
- Betty Who as Kira Matthews
- Mary McCormack as Debra Clarke
- Denny Love as Jarrod
- Ramona Young as Emily
- Kara Royster as Kaylee
- Meg Smith as Hannah
- Abby Van Gerpen as Heather
- Jeryl Prescott as Peg

== Production ==
In June 2019, it was announced HBO Max would distribute the film, with Rachel Lee Goldenberg directing from a screenplay by Ted Caplan and Jenni Hendriks based upon their own novel of the same name. Greg Berlanti served as a producer under his Berlanti Productions banner. In September 2019, Haley Lu Richardson and Barbie Ferreira joined the cast of the film. In October 2019, Sugar Lyn Beard joined the cast of the film.

=== Filming ===
Principal photography began on October 15, 2019, in Albuquerque, New Mexico, and wrapped on November 19, 2019.

== Release ==
The film was released on September 10, 2020, on HBO Max.

== Reception ==
On Rotten Tomatoes, the film has an approval rating of 91% based on 43 reviews, with an average rating of 6.8/10. The site's critics consensus reads: "Unpregnant puts a compelling twist on the road trip comedy -- and treats its sensitive subject with heart." On Metacritic, the film has a weighted average score of 61 out of 100, based on reviews from 11 critics, indicating "generally favorable reviews".

Inkoo Kang of The Hollywood Reporter wrote, "Largely fueled by Richardson and Ferreira’s charisma and chemistry, Unpregnant is an amiable if uneven ride." Natalia Winkelman of The New York Times wrote, "Its driving force may seem topical, but the story's heart is timeless: the harmony between longtime friends."

=== Accolades ===
Unpregnant was nominated for the 2021 GLAAD Media Award for Outstanding TV Movie.
