= Valley Girl (2020 film) =

2020 film by Rachel Lee Goldenberg

- Release poster
- Directed by: Rachel Lee Goldenberg
- Screenplay by: Amy Talkington
- Story by: Wayne Crawford; Andrew Lane
- Based on: Valley Girl by: Wayne Crawford; Andrew Lane
- Produced by: Matt Smith; Steven J. Wolfe
- Starring: Jessica Rothe; Josh Whitehouse; Mae Whitman; Judy Greer
- Cinematography: Adam Silver
- Edited by: Julia Wong
- Music by: Roger Neill
- Production companies: Orion Classics; Metro-Goldwyn-Mayer Pictures; Sneak Preview Entertainment
- Distributed by: United Artists Releasing
- Release date: May 8, 2020
- Running time: 102 minutes
- Country: United States
- Language: English
- Box office: $7,671

Valley Girl is a 2020 American jukebox musical romantic comedy film directed by Rachel Lee Goldenberg, written by Amy Talkington from a story by Wayne Crawford and Andrew Lane, and produced by Matt Smith and Steven J. Wolfe. It is a remake of the 1983 film of the same name and stars Jessica Rothe, Josh Whitehouse, Logan Paul, and Judy Greer. The film follows Julie Richman, a Valley girl, who falls in love with Randy, a rebellious punk, during the early 1980s.

Metro-Goldwyn-Mayer first announced a musical remake in February 2012, but it was halted until November 2016 when Goldenberg joined the project as director and Rothe was cast in the lead role. Casting announcements continued until May 2017 and principal photography began that same month, taking place in Los Angeles. Following the completion of filming, Metro-Goldwyn-Mayer scheduled the film for release on June 29, 2018. However, the film was delayed following controversies surrounding Logan Paul, who portrayed Mickey.

Valley Girl was released simultaneously through video on demand and in select drive-in theaters on May 8, 2020, by United Artists Releasing. It was initially set to receive a wide theatrical release on the same date, but these plans were cancelled because of the COVID-19 pandemic. The film received mixed reviews from critics, with praise for the soundtrack, acting, and tone, though many deemed it to be inferior to the original film.

== Plot ==
In present day, Ruby Richman arrives home, upset about breaking up with her boyfriend that night over her plans to participate in a study program in Japan. Her mother, Julie, sits her down and recounts to Ruby her own final semester of high school.

In the early 1980s, Julie is a Valley girl who lives in Encino, Los Angeles, frequents shopping malls with her friends, Stacey, Karen and Loryn and dates Mickey, a popular but arrogant jock. However, she begins to feel disillusioned to her lifestyle and has second thoughts regarding her future with Mickey. She also aspires to attend the Fashion Institute of Technology in New York City, rather than Cal State Northridge, as her parents and friends expect. At the beach, she comes across Randy, a Hollywood punk and lead singer of the band Safety Recall. The two flirt briefly before she abruptly leaves. That night, Julie and her friends attend a costume party at Mickey's house. Randy and his bandmates, Sticky and Jack, arrive at the venue, but are promptly thrown out. Later, Randy insists Julie leaves the party with him. Accompanied by a reluctant Stacey, Julie joins Randy and his friends to attend the band's performance at a punk nightclub. After Stacey leaves and Safety Recall perform, Julie spends the rest of the night with Randy, culminating with the two sharing a kiss.

The next morning, Julie breaks up with Mickey, which frustrates her friends. She begins spending more time with Randy and changes her fashion style, while Karen begins dating Mickey. This causes further conflict between her and her friends, while the same rift occurs between Randy and his bandmates. One day, Julie invites Randy over for dinner on behest of her parents Diana and Steve. However, he overhears them talk about his lack of discipline and leaves. Later, at Stacey's birthday party, Mickey begins to antagonize Randy, resulting in the two getting into a physical fight that gets Randy thrown out. Stacey also gets upset at Julie for bringing him and forces her to leave too. Outside, Julie breaks up with Randy after the two argue over their clashing backgrounds and her friends' attitudes toward him.

Later, Julie reluctantly agrees to be Mickey's date to the prom, who has broken up with Karen. She apologizes to Stacey, who forgives her and reveals she has been accepted to Dartmouth College. Meanwhile, Randy makes amends with his bandmates and decide to leave for New York before encouraging him to go after Julie. At the mall, Mickey reveals that Karen was not accepted to Northridge, unlike Loryn. On the night of the prom, Julie and Mickey are crowned prom king and queen. As the two dance, Julie breaks up with Mickey and begins to leave. Safety Recall arrive for a surprise performance, however, Mickey and his friends sabotage the equipment. Despite this, Julie and Randy share a duet and reunite. Later, Julie reconciles with Karen and Loryn is contacted to be a background dancer in an upcoming music video. As their friends dance, Julie and Randy leave the venue in Mickey's rented limousine.

In present day, Julie reveals that Safety Recall signed a record deal in New York as she was finishing her degree at FIT and joined them on their first tour before eventually breaking up with Randy. She tells Ruby that while she did not end up with Randy, she enjoyed their time together and is happy with the life that she chose, with the principle of never having regrets. In the end, text appears on screen, revealing everyone's future successes, except for Mickey who received a restraining order from the producers of The Bachelor for repeatedly sending them his audition tape.

== Cast ==
- Jessica Rothe as Julie Richman
  - Alicia Silverstone as Older Julie Richman
- Josh Whitehouse as Randy
- Mae Whitman as Jack
- Jessie Ennis as Stacey
- Chloe Bennet as Karen
- Peyton List as Courtney (Note: Although given a supporting credit in the film's title sequence, List appears only as a non-speaking background extra in several scenes; most of the scenes in which List originally had a speaking or singing role (including a mashup rendition of "Mickey" by Toni Basil and "Call Me" by Blondie, which was featured in the film's soundtrack) were not included in the final cut.)
- Ashleigh Murray as Loryn
- Logan Paul as Mickey Bowen
- Judy Greer as Diana Richman
- Rob Huebel as Steve Richman
- Mario Revolori as "Sticky"
- Camila Morrone as Ruby Richman
- Alex Lewis as Casper
- Mary Neely as Felecia
- Alex MacNicoll as Brad
- Andrew Kai as Rob
- Danny Ramirez as Chip
- Randall Park as Principal Evans
- Josh Fadem as Gary
- Nicole Byer as Deejay
- Thomas Lennon as Rodney Bingenheimer
- Allyn Rachel as Rachel Donahue
- E.G. Daily as Mrs. Bowen
- Heidi Holicker as Mrs. H
- Eric Garcetti as Mr. G
- Deborah Foreman as Shopgirl

== Production ==
In February 2012, Metro-Goldwyn-Mayer and Paramount Pictures announced a musical remake of 1983 film Valley Girl with Clay Weiner directing.

In November 2016, Rachel Lee Goldenberg joined the project as director, with Clay Weiner and Paramount Pictures dropping out of the project which will be distributed through United Artists Releasing. The same month, Jessica Rothe was cast in the starring role of Julie Richman.

Josh Whitehouse was announced as the punk rock musician love interest in January 2017. In April 2017, Chloe Bennet was cast as Karen, a queen bee Valley girl, Ashleigh Murray as Loryn, a boy-crazy popular girl, Jessie Ennis as Stacey, Julie's loyal best friend, and Logan Paul as Mickey, a popular tennis star. In May 2017, Mae Whitman joined the cast as Jack, Randy's lesbian best friend and bandmate, followed in June by Peyton List as Courtney, a cheerleader.

=== Filming ===
Principal photography began in May 2017, in Los Angeles, California, and wrapped in June 2017.

== Soundtrack ==
The soundtrack album for the film was released by Interscope Records on May 8, 2020. The song "We Got the Beat", performed by Jessica Rothe, Chloe Bennet, Jessie Ennis, and Ashleigh Murray, was released as a promotional single on April 24, 2020.

== Release ==
The film was originally scheduled for release on June 29, 2018, but it was later pulled from the schedule following controversies surrounding Logan Paul.

Valley Girl was released simultaneously through video on demand and in select drive-in theaters on May 8, 2020, by United Artists Releasing. The film was initially set to receive a wide theatrical release on the same date, but these plans were cancelled due to the movie theater closures since mid-March because of the COVID-19 pandemic.

== Home media ==
The film was released on DVD and Blu-ray on October 6, 2020, by Warner Bros. Home Entertainment (under license to MGM).

== Reception ==
On review aggregator website Rotten Tomatoes, the film holds an approval rating of 59% based on 54 reviews, with an average of 5.9/10. The website's critical consensus reads, "Valley Girl won't, like, make you forget the original or anything, but as a breezy jukebox musicals go, it's still fairly rad." On Metacritic, the film has a weighted average score of 53 out of 100, based on nine critics, indicating "mixed or average reviews."
