= Josh Whitehouse =

English actor (born 1990)

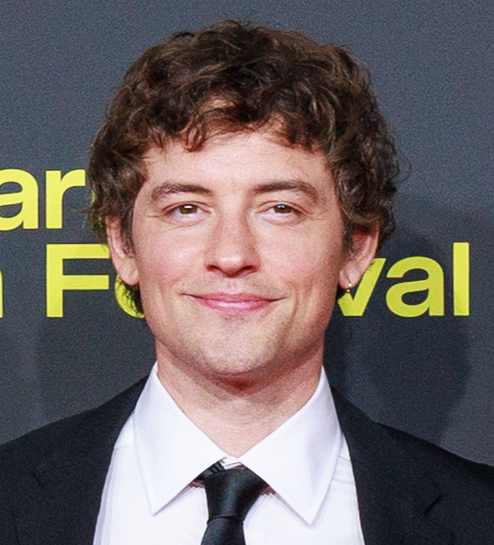
- Whitehouse in 2025
- Born: Joshua George Whitehouse; 27 February 1990 (age 36); Chester, England
- Years active: 2014–present

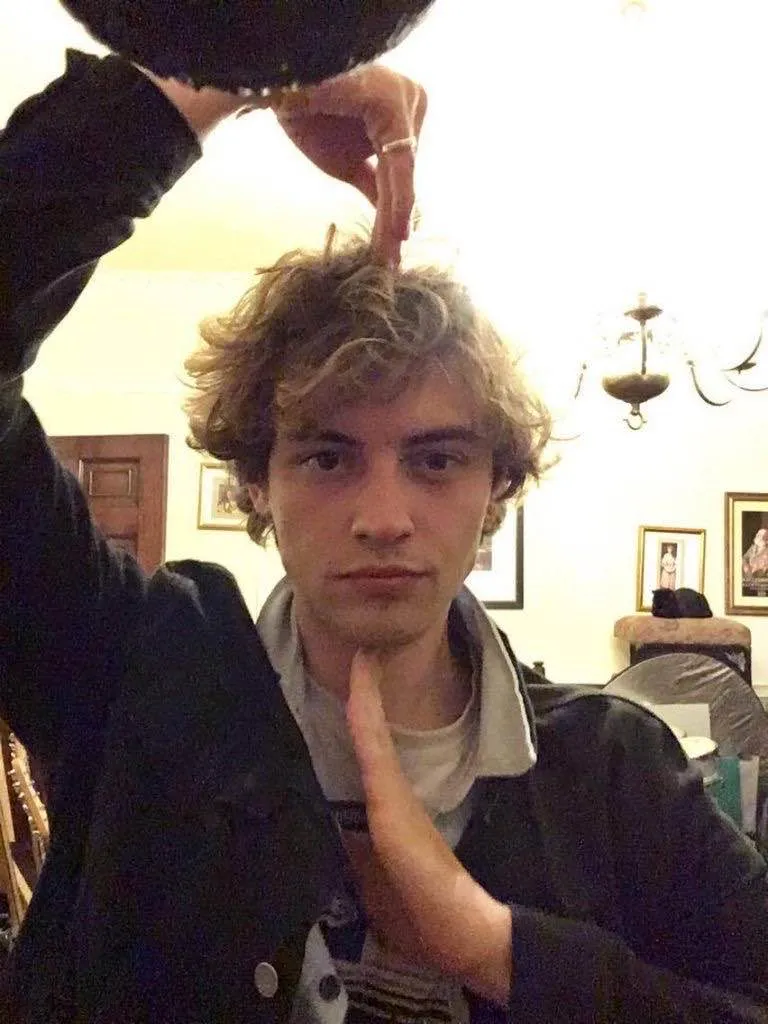
Whitehouse in 2016

Joshua George Whitehouse (born 27 February 1990) is an English actor, musician and artist. His films include Northern Soul (2014), Modern Life Is Rubbish (2017), and Valley Girl (2020). On television, he is known for his roles in the BBC One series Poldark (2017–2018) and the Amazon Prime series Daisy Jones & the Six (2023).

== Early life ==
Whitehouse is from Chester. He attended Bishop Heber High School and Queen's Park High School.

== Career ==
In 2014, in his debut film, Whitehouse played the lead role as Matt in the film Northern Soul in a cast which included Steve Coogan and Ricky Tomlinson. In 2015, he starred as Hugh Armitage in the BBC series Poldark, alongside Aidan Turner and Eleanor Tomlinson.

In 2018, he was originally set to play an unspecified leading role in the unproduced Game of Thrones prequel series. He co-starred with Vanessa Hudgens in the Netflix Christmas film The Knight Before Christmas (2019).

In 2020, he was again in a lead role as Randy, alongside Jessica Rothe in the teen rom-com Valley Girl (2020).

In 2023, he starred as Eddie Roundtree, bassist and one of the founding members of the band The Six, in the Amazon Prime Video streaming drama series Daisy Jones & the Six.

== Filmography ==
=== Film ===
Year	Title	Role	Notes
2014	Northern Soul	Matt	
2016	Alleycats	Chris	
2016	The Receptionist	Frank	
2017	Modern Life Is Rubbish	Liam	
2019	The Knight Before Christmas	Sir Cole Frederick Christopher Lyons of Norwich	
2020	Valley Girl	Randy	
2024	Ozi: Voice of the Forest	Peanut	Voice role
2025	Legend of the Happy Worker	Joe	

=== Television ===
Year	Title	Role	Notes
2007	Living on the edge	Himself	
2017–2018	Poldark	Hugh Armitage	10 episodes
2020	Rhyme Time Town	Chuckley	3 episodes; voice role
2023	Daisy Jones & the Six	Eddie Roundtree	Main role
