= Rachel Lee Goldenberg =

American film director and screenwriter

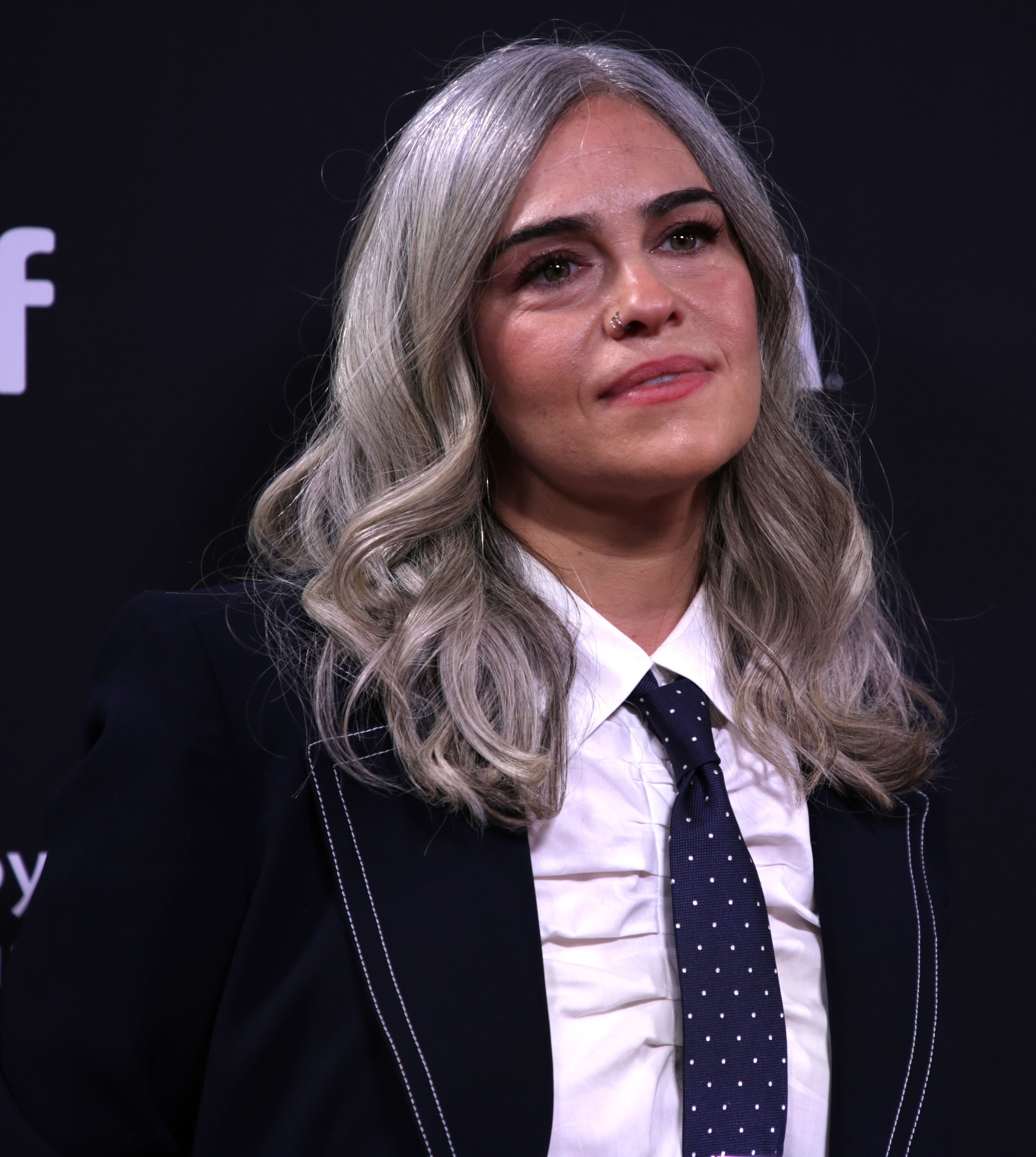
- Goldenberg in 2025 at TIFF.
- Born: 1984 or 1985 (age 40–41); United States
- Education: Ithaca College (BS)
- Occupations: Director; screenwriter

Rachel Lee Goldenberg (born 1984/1985) is an American film director and screenwriter. She has directed a number of feature films and television episodes. She had her breakthrough after she was discovered by Will Ferrell, who gave her the opportunity to direct the Lifetime television film A Deadly Adoption, in which he starred.

Her 1980s musical film Valley Girl was released in May 2020. She has also directed films made by The Asylum. In addition she directed web shorts for Funny or Die, including the series Lady Time. Her next film, Unpregnant, premiered on September 10, 2020, on HBO Max.

== Early life ==
In 2003, Goldenberg graduated from Algonquin Regional High School in Northboro, Massachusetts. She then attended Ithaca College where she obtained her B.S. in cinema and photography.

== Career ==
After graduating from college, Goldenberg moved to Los Angeles where she worked at the B movie production company The Asylum. She soon was given the opportunity to direct various films. Then she began directing and producing for Funny or Die, a website launched by actor Will Ferrell and screenwriter Adam McKay. As part of her stint at Funny or Die, she served as the White House liaison during the Barack Obama administration. In 2014, she won the Primetime Emmy Award for Outstanding Short-Format Live-Action Entertainment Program for producing the Obama episode of the series Between Two Ferns with Zach Galifianakis.

Will Ferrell and Harper Steele became interested in her unusual resume of both comedy and Lifetime movies, and hired her to direct Ferrell and Kristen Wiig in the Lifetime television film A Deadly Adoption.

== Filmography ==
=== Film ===
Direct-to-video

Year	Title	Director	Writer	Editor
2008	Sunday School Musical	Yes	Yes	Yes
2010	Sir Arthur Conan Doyle's Sherlock Holmes	Yes	No	Yes
2011	Princess and the Pony	Yes	Yes	Yes
2012	Grimm's Snow White	Yes	No	No

Feature film

Year	Title	Director	Writer
2020	Valley Girl	Yes	No
2020	Unpregnant	Yes	Yes
2025	Swiped	Yes	Yes

=== Television ===
TV movies

- Love at the Christmas Table (2012)
- Escape From Polygamy (2014)
- A Deadly Adoption (2015)
- Playing Dead (2018)

TV series

Year	Title	Episode(s)
2014–15	Z Nation	"Sisters of Mercy"
2014–15	Z Nation	"Zombaby!"
2015	The Mindy Project	"Stay at Home MILF"
2016	Party Over Here	"Suffragettes"
2016	Angie Tribeca	"Miso Dead"
2016	Angie Tribeca	"The Coast Is Fear"
2016	Lady Time	"Episode #1.104"
2016	Lady Time	"Salute Your Culottes"
2016	Lady Time	"Eggers Can't Be Choosers"
2017	Man Seeking Woman	"Futon"
2017	Man Seeking Woman	"Pad Thai"
2017	Teachers	"Held Back"
2017	Teachers	"Thirty-One and Done"
2017	I'm Sorry	"Pilot"
2019	Divorce	"Away Games"
2019	Looking for Alaska	"Tell Them I Said Something..."
2020	Everything's Gonna Be Okay	"Silkmoths"
2020	Everything's Gonna Be Okay	"Blue Death-Feigning Beetles"
2020	Everything's Gonna Be Okay	"Maggots"
2020	Everything's Gonna Be Okay	"Monarch Butterflies"
2022	Minx	"Not like a shvantz right in the face"
2022	Minx	"Au revoir, le double dong"
2022	Minx	"Norman Mailer, Samantha Shortcake"
2022	Minx	"Oh, so you're the sun now? You're the giver of life?"
2023	Tiny Beautiful Things	"Pilot"
2023	Tiny Beautiful Things	"Yours Sugar"
