= WordGirl season 4 =

WordGirl
- Season 4
- No. of episodes: 15 (27 segments)

Release
- Original network: PBS Kids Go!
- Original release: September 5, 2011 – June 11, 2012

Season chronology
- ← Previous; Season 3 Next → Season 5

The fourth season of the animated series WordGirl was originally broadcast on PBS Kids Go! in the United States from September 5, 2011 to June 11, 2012. The fourth season contained 15 episodes (27 segments).

== Cast ==
| Cast | Characters |
|---|---|
| Dannah Phirman | Becky Botsford/WordGirl, Claire McCallister, Chuck's Mom, Edith Von Housenhous, Pretty Princess |
| Chris Parnell | Narrator, Henchmen #1, Museum Security Guard, Exposition Guy |
| James Adomian | Bob/Captain Huggy Face, Chip Von Dumor, Harry Kempel, Hal Hardbargain |
| Jack D. Ferraiolo | The Butcher |
| Fred Stoller | Chuck the Evil Sandwich Making Guy |
| Cree Summer | Granny May |
| Patton Oswalt | Theodore "Tobey" McCallister the Third, Robots |
| Tom Kenny | Dr. Two-Brains, TJ Botsford, Warden Chalmers, Brent the Handsome Successful Everyone Loves Him Sandwich Making Guy |
| Jeffrey Tambor | Mr. Big |
| John C. McGinley | The Whammer |
| Maria Bamford | Violet Heaslip, Sally Botsford, Leslie, Mrs. Best |
| Grey DeLisle | Lady Redundant Woman, Ms. Question |
| Pamela Adlon | Eileen aka The Birthday Girl |
| Ryan Raddatz | Todd "Scoops" Ming, Tim Botsford |
| Larry Murphy | The Amazing Rope Guy, Gold Store Dealer, Soccer Referee, Mr. Best, Used Car Salesman, Anthony the News Reporter |
| Jen Cohn | Female Bank Teller |
| Daran Norris | Seymour Orlando Smooth, Nocan the Contrarian |
| Ron Lynch | The Mayor |
| H. Jon Benjamin | Reginald the Jewelry Store Clerk, Invisi-Bill |
| Amy Sedaris | Mrs. Davis |
| Mike O'Connell | Grocery Store Manager, Big Left Hand Guy |
| Jane Lynch | Miss Power |

=== May I Have a Word cast ===
| May I Have a Word cast | Characters |
|---|---|
| J. D. Cerna | Beau Handsome |
| Tom Kenny | Phil |
| Orlando Brown | Tommy |
| Kelly Miyahara | Emily |
| James Adomian | Captain Huggy Face |

== Episodes ==
| No. overall | No. in season | Title | Vocab words | Written by | Villains | May I Have a Word? | Original release date | Prod. code |
|---|---|---|---|---|---|---|---|---|
| 66a | 1a | "Sonny Days with a Chance of Showers" | Precipitation, Meteorologist | Carla Filisha | Eileen the Birthday Girl | Shatter | September 5, 2011 | 401A |
The Birthday Girl kidnaps meteorologist Sonny Days and demands that he announce her birthday on TV. Special Guest Star: Al Roker as Sonny Days
| 66b | 1b | "Seymour ... Right After This" | Delay, Captivated | Scott Ganz and Andrew Samson | Seymour Orlando Smooth | Shatter (bonus round) | September 5, 2011 | 401B |
Becky suspects Seymour Smooth is up to no good when he delays announcing his new show's winning ticket numbers.
| 67a | 2a | "The Fill-In" | Surrender, Temporary | Jack Ferraiolo | Dr. Two-Brains and The Butcher | Smudge | October 10, 2011 | 402A |
Dr. Two-Brains has big plans when the Butcher fills in for one of Two-Brains' henchmen.
| 67b | 2b | "Word (Hicc)Up!" | Remedy, Glitch | John N. Huss | Chuck the Evil Sandwich Making Guy and Hal Hardbargain | Smudge (bonus round) | October 10, 2011 | 402B |
Becky suspects Seymour Smooth is up to no good when he delays announcing his new show's winning ticket numbers.
| 68a | 3a | "Mouse Brain Take-Over" | Abandon, Dilemma | Jack Ferraiolo | Dr. Two-Brains | Binoculars | October 11, 2011 | 403A |
WordGirl learns that Dr. Two-Brains is on an all-out cheese rampage just as she's about to give a tour of her secret hideout to the winner of the WordGirl Synonym Contest.
| 68b | 3b | "Leslie Makes It Big" | Ridiculous, Assume | Sergio Cilli | Mr. Big & Leslie | Binoculars (bonus round) | October 11, 2011 | 403B |
Mr. Big is arrested, leaving it to his assistant, Leslie, to carry out their latest evil plan: building the world's most powerful mind-control device.
| 69a | 4a | "Chuck with a Sidekick of Brent" | Accomplish, Schedule | Carla Filisha | Chuck the Evil Sandwich Making Guy | Imitate | October 12, 2011 | 404A |
Chuck teams with his brother Brent and tries to turn the city into a giant sandwich.
| 69b | 4b | "Yarn-4-Gold" | Rubbish, Swap | Ryan Raddatz | Granny May | Imitate (bonus round) | October 12, 2011 | 404B |
Bampy helps WordGirl stop Granny May's latest plot: exchanging gold jewelry for purple yarn. Special Guest Star: Tim Conway as Bampy Botsford
| 70a | 5a | "Whammer Anniversary" | Glimpse, Occasion | Tom Martin and Rick Groel | The Whammer | Bewilder | October 13, 2011 | 405A |
Becky babysits TJ while Mr. and Mrs. Botsford celebrate their anniversary at an ice-cream parlor that just happens to be the target of the Whammer's wrath.
| 70b | 5b | "Rat Trap" | Confiscate, Whiz | Eric Ledgin | Dr. Two-Brains and Hal Hardbargain | Bewilder (bonus round) | October 13, 2011 | 405B |
Dr. Two-Brains forces Hal Hardbargain to create a ray that turns superheroes into cheese.
| 71a | 6a | "WordGirl and Bobbleboy" | Bobble, Souvenir | Ryan Raddatz | First Energy Monster, then Chuck the Evil Sandwich Making Guy, and finally Dr. Two-Brains | Strenuous | October 14, 2011 | 406A |
TJ makes and sells WordGirl bobblehead dolls which makes WordGirl distracted when it comes to the attacks by the Energy Monster, Chuck the Evil Sandwich Making Guy, and Dr. Two-Brains.
| 71b | 6b | "Crime in the Key of V" | Exceptional, Meddle | Scott Ganz and Andrew Samson | Victoria Best | Strenuous (bonus round) | October 14, 2011 | 406B |
Villainous Victoria Best sets out to be the best superhero in the city in order to force WordGirl into retirement. Special Guest Star: Kristen Schaal as Victoria Best
| 72a | 7a | "Where Have All the Villains Gone?" | Eliminate, Entire | Carla Filisha | Ms. Question | Perspire | November 14, 2011 | 407A |
Ms. Question devises a devious plan to get rid of WordGirl–eliminate all of the city's villains so WordGirl is no longer needed.
| 72b | 7b | "Captain Tangent Returns" | Vessel, Publish | John N. Huss | Captain Tangent | Perspire (bonus round) | November 14, 2011 | 407B |
Scoops joins Captain Tangent's pirate crew in order to write a newspaper article about them. Special Guest Star: John Henson as Captain Tangent
| 73 | 8 | "A World Without WordGirl" | Obligation, Antsy Enchanted, Unusual | Scott Ganz and Andrew Samson Ryan Raddatz | Chuck the Evil Sandwich Making Guy, The Butcher, Dr. Two-Brains, Energy Monster and Theodore "Tobey" McCallister III (cameo) | Binoculars | December 16, 2011 | 413 |
Today is Becky's birthday, and her parents have planned her "the greatest party EVER!" Becky is extremely excited and antsy to start partying. What's first in store is an enormous Pretty Princess bouncy castle, which Becky wants to jump in right away. However, she picks up with her super hearing a robbery at a sandwich shop. Bob hears it too, and reminds her of her obligation to protect the city. Reluctantly, Becky transforms into WordGirl and flies to the shop, where she finds Chuck robbing it. Chuck says that he wants people to eat only sandwiches made by him, and doesn't want anyone else to make them. After some complaining from both people and a definition of "antsy", WordGirl ties up Chuck and tells the shop owner to keep an eye on him until the police arrive. After a brief summary about the previous episode, Becky is still trying to figure out about the changes in the city. She starts by asking her parents what they put in the cake, and after getting no helpful response, she looks at the empty cake mix box. Confused by the "Warning: If electrified, cake may become enchanted" label, she finally realizes that this was probably a birthday joke, "getting Chuck to pretend he's the king of the city". Seeing her parents confused by her remark, Becky realizes that it's not a joke, and the cake really was enchanted. Wanting to investigate, she makes an excuse to leave with Bob. She sees that all the shops are sandwich shops and that there are statues of Chuck everywhere. One suddenly makes an announcement that "it's time for Sandwich Talk", and hearing this, a couple of citizens start replacing certain words with sandwich-related words, such as "I really mayonnaise your coat" or "It was a bargain at mustard dollars and ketchupy-ketchup cents". Peeved by such nonsense, Becky stands up to correct them.
| 74a | 9a | "Have Snob, Will Travel" | Formal, Fret | Jack Ferraiolo | The Butcher | Collection | January 16, 2012 | 408A |
The Butcher kidnaps Reginald the jeweler in order to use his expertise to plan his next heist.
| 74b | 9b | "Tobey's Playground Calamity" | Dedicate, Calamity | Sergio Cilli and Tom Martin | Theodore "Tobey" McCallister III | Collection (bonus round) | January 16, 2012 | 408B |
Ms. Davis holds a recycling contest to raise funds for a new playground after the old one is decimated by villains.
| 75 76 | 10 11 | "The Rise of Miss Power" | Harsh, Vigor, Encouraging, Ploy | Jack Ferraiolo | Miss Power and practically every other WordGirl villain | Cower and Dangle | February 20, 2012 (Note: This episode was originally produced as a 52-minute special; it would later be recut into a pair of two-part 26-minute episodes. The edited version aired as part of season 6 on August 13, 2013.) | 414 |
| 75 76 | 10 11 | "The Rise of Miss Power" | Harsh, Vigor, Encouraging, Ploy | Jack Ferraiolo | Miss Power and practically every other WordGirl villain | Cower and Dangle | February 20, 2012 | 415 |
Miss Power and her sidekick Colonel Giggle Cheeks have come to earth. WordGirl wants her to teach her everything she knows. Besides using her super strength and speed to defeat villains like Chuck the Evil Sandwich Making Guy and Tobey, Miss Power has another secret weapon: using mean words against others. WordGirl would rather not use her words harshly. After giving it a shot, she feels empowered. Miss Power has taken bullying too far and WordGirl doesn't like being associated with such a mean person. When she tries to stand up to Miss Power, WordGirl gets belittled and stripped of her super hero status. Dejected and sulking, Becky goes home to her family. But Miss Power is there to take Sally Botsford away. WordGirl needs a quick plan to save her mom and get rid of Miss Power and Huggy shares a pamphlet full of secret battle moves from her home planet Lexicon. While WordGirl brushes up on that, Sally works with Fair City's villains to hold off Miss Power. Special guest star: Jane Lynch as Miss Power Note: During the episode, a four-segment "Pretty Princess Power Hour" sketch is shown between acts, filling in for the average two-segment "May I Have a Word?" sketch, presumably to fill the double-length time slot.
| 77a | 12a | "The Learnerer" | Suffix, Misjudge | Jack Ferraiolo | The Learnerer | Elegant | March 23, 2012 | 410A |
A new villain called The Learnerer steals a giant diamond. And it's up to WordGirl and Huggy to stop him. Special Guest Star: "Weird Al" Yankovic as the Learnerer
| 77b | 12b | "Mr. Big's Dinner and a Scam" | Embellish, Leery | Jayne Hamil | Mr. Big | Elegant (bonus round) | March 23, 2012 | 410B |
Mr. Big employs mind control to make sure his dinner-theater show is a success.
| 78a | 13a | "The Birthday Girl's Monstrous Gift" | Guzzle, Monstrous | Douglas Reid | Energy Monster and Eileen the Birthday Girl | Doze | April 16, 2012 | 409A |
A carnival is endangered by the Energy Monster. She must also contend with the Birthday Girl.
| 78b | 13b | "Hal the Haggler" | Defend, Haggle | Sergio Cilli and Kevin Petersen | Granny May and Hal Hardbargain | Doze (bonus round) | April 16, 2012 | 409B |
WordGirl battles Granny May who's plotting to steal Cleopatra's bed from a museum.
| 79a | 14a | "WordBot" | Devoted, Backfire | Rick Groel | Theodore "Tobey" McCallister III and WordBot | Shatter | May 21, 2012 | 411A |
Tobey is determined to get WordGirl back for constantly destroying his robots, so he builds a robot clone of WordGirl named WordBot. But when the robot gets jealous of the fact that Tobey is speaking mostly to WordGirl herself, and turns on its creator, WordGirl and Tobey are forced to team up to fight back.
| 79b | 14b | "Mount Rush Here" | Advantage, Tribute | Adam F. Goldberg and Chris Bishop | Mr. Big | Shatter (bonus round) | May 21, 2012 | 411B |
When all the adults go missing in Fair City, the kids are taking advantage of a parent-free world. But when it starts to take a toll on them, WordGirl discovers that Mr. Big is using a mind-control device to make all the adults build a tribute in his honor. WordGirl is able to destroy the machine and save the adults.
| 80a | 15a | "Road Rage, Anger, and Fury" | Obstacle, Rant | Ryan Raddatz | Lady Redundant Woman | Smudge | June 11, 2012 | 412A |
Lady Redundant Woman uses nefarious means to circumvent the city's congested traffic.
| 80b | 15b | "By Jove, You've Wrecked My Robots!" | Savvy, Realize | Jack Ferraiolo | Theodore "Tobey" McCallister III | Smudge (bonus round) | June 11, 2012 | 412B |
Tobey brings a board game about evil robots to Becky's house in hopes of exposing WordGirl's true identity. Note: Tobey's board game is a parody of Battleship.
