= WordGirl season 7 =

WordGirl
- Season 7
- No. of episodes: 13 (25 segments)

Release
- Original network: PBS Kids
- Original release: August 4, 2014 – February 20, 2015

Season chronology
- ← Previous; Season 6 Next → Season 8

The seventh season of the animated series WordGirl was originally broadcast on PBS Kids in the United States between August 4, 2014 and February 20, 2015. The seventh season contained 13 episodes (25 segments).

== Cast ==
Cast	Characters
Dannah Phirman	Becky Botsford/WordGirl, Claire McCallister, Chuck's Mom, Edith Von Housenhous, Pretty Princess
Chris Parnell	Narrator, Henchmen #1, Museum Security Guard, Exposition Guy
Cree Summer	Granny May
Fred Stoller	Chuck the Evil Sandwich Making Guy
Patton Oswalt	Theodore "Tobey" McCallister the Third, Robots
Tom Kenny	Dr. Two-Brains, TJ Botsford, Warden Chalmers, Brent the Handsome Successful Everyone Loves Him Sandwich Making Guy
Maria Bamford	Violet Heaslip, Sally Botsford, Leslie, Johnson, Loretta-Sanchez Johnson
H. Jon Benjamin	Reginald the Jewelry Store Clerk, Invisi-Bill
Jeffrey Tambor	Mr. Big
John C. McGinley	The Whammer
Ryan Raddatz	Todd "Scoops" Ming, Tim Botsford.
Jack D. Ferraiolo	The Butcher
James Adomian	Bob/Captain Huggy Face, Chip Von Dumor, Harry Kempel, Hal Hardbargain
Larry Murphy	The Amazing Rope Guy, African-American Cop, Anthony the News Reporter
Grey DeLisle	Lady Redundant Woman, Ms. Question
Pamela Adlon	Eileen aka The Birthday Girl

=== May I Have a Word cast ===
May I Have a Word cast	Characters
J. D. Cerna	Beau Handsome
Tom Kenny	Phil
Orlando Brown	Tommy
Kelly Miyahara	Emily
James Adomian	Captain Huggy Face

== Episodes ==
No. overall	No. in season	Title	Vocab words	Written by	Villains	May I Have a Word?	Original release date	Prod. code
105	1	"Kid Math"	Calculate, Equal/Equation Reproduce, Hint	Eric Ledgin Justin Shanes	Dr. Two-Brains	Elegant	August 4, 2014	712
Kid Math, a new kid superhero from the planet Hexagon, but it even happens that Dr. Two-Brains gets away with his plan to turn the entire city into a city. Becky is trying to teach Rex what it means to become a superhero, not just defeating villains. Meanwhile, Kid Math and WordGirl fight into shape in time to stop Dr. Two-Brains' next snack. Special Guest Star: Jack McBrayer as Kid Math
106a	2a	"A Few Words from WordGirl"	Dawdle, Inspiration	Kevin Pederson	Dr. Two-Brains	Apprehend	August 5, 2014	708A
The school is gearing up for Inspiration Day, since WordGirl's heroic actions always uplift the town's citizens, the Principal asks WordGirl to make the keynote speech at the event. She agrees but immediately begins to feel the pressure. People are expecting a lot from her speech, and even though she can always be counted on to provide a word's definition.
106b	2b	"Ears to You"	Original, Laughable	Will Shepard	Mr. Big	Apprehend (bonus round)	August 5, 2014	708B
Mr. Big is up to his mind-control tricks once again, this time through the use of some ultra adorable Squishy Bunny Ears. When Becky sees the Ears for sale, turns out, Mr. Botsford does, and as soon as he puts them on, he causes a citywide craze. People start buying up all of Mr. Big's Squishy Bunny Ears.
107a	3a	"El Queso Mysterioso"	Illusion, Influence	John N. Huss	Dr. Two-Brains	Collection	August 6, 2014	711A
It's the day of the Magical Magicians Convention, and the entire Botsford family is excited to go and see their favorite magician and perform live, El Mysterioso. Everyone except Becky, she goes to the Pretty Princess book signing across the street. But Mr. Botsford emphasizes how important it is that they spend the day as a family. In the middle of the convention, Becky's super hearing picks up the sound of Dr. Two-Brains' evil cackle from across the city. Note: El Queso Misterioso means "The Mysterious Cheese" in Spanish.
107b	3b	"Putt with Honor"	Concentrate, Tournament	Jayne Hamil	Eileen the Birthday Girl	Collection (bonus round)	August 6, 2014	711B
TJ Botsford is mere hours away from winning the local mini golf tournament and getting his picture on Patrick Needlemeyer's Miniature Golf Super Universe Wall of Fame (which is only the biggest deal ever). When Becky catches Eileen cheating she knows she has to stop her. Special Guest Star: Alfred Molina as Patrick Needlemeyer
108a	4a	"It's Your Party and I'll Cry If I Want To"	Rampage, Sensitive	Tom Martin	Theodore "Tobey" MacCallister III	Doze	August 7, 2014	701A
Becky discovers that Violet and Scoops were invited to Katy's birthday party while she wasn't on her invite list. However, Tobey sends his robots out on a citywide rampage, destroying everything in their path.
108b	4b	"Becky's Bad-itude"	Juvenile, Lack	Jayne Hamil	Dr. Two-Brains	Doze (bonus round)	August 7, 2014	701B
Becky feels bored watching Vanilly and Billy, a pair of outer space rock 'n roll ninjas, they're the stars of the most popular TV show at school, and anybody has tickets to their concert. Thanks to Mr. Botsford, Becky has tickets and straight to The Squishy Funbots Rollerama. At the concert, Becky feels embarrassed, tries to mention her, but when Dr. Two-Brains crashes the Funbots concert.
109a	5a	"First One to Win Wins"	Victor, Fuming	Douglas Reid	The Butcher	Bewilder	August 8, 2014	702A
At the Botsford house, TJ has turned everything into an impossible competition, causing Becky to grow more and more frustrated every time she loses. When the Butcher steals Mrs. Von Hoosinghaus' prize poodle, she is eager to suit up as WordGirl and finally claim victory.
109b	5b	"A Little Bigger WordGirl"	Adjust, Elongate	Eric Ledgin	Dr. Two-Brains	Bewilder (bonus round)	August 8, 2014	702B
When Dr. Two-Brains is about to shrink and capture WordGirl, she is able to change the size of a mouse, his plan backfires, and WordGirl becomes bigger, not smaller. Though her bigger size allows her to break free from Dr. Two-Brains, she quickly realizes that she can no longer control her superpowers.
110a	6a	"Guess Who's Coming to Thanksgiving Dinner"	Grateful, Reluctant	Eric Ledgin	Theodore "Tobey" MacCallister III	Doze	November 26, 2014	709A
After an unfortunate turn of events at the grocery store, Tobey and his mother, Claire McCallister, become the guests of honor at the Botsford's Thanksgiving dinner. Becky is less than thrilled to be sharing a table with one of her secret nemeses, Tobey is spending Thanksgiving with WordGirl.
110b	6b	"Judging Butcher"	Appreciate ††, Lyrics	Dan Milledge	The Butcher	Doze (bonus round)	November 26, 2014	709B
Becky's best friend Violet may be great at drawing and painting, but when it comes to singing, she just says it isn't her forte. But when Violet tells Becky that she is going to audition for The City's Got Too Much Talent, Becky doesn't have the heart to tell her it isn't a good idea. To make things even worse, the show has a new judge: The Butcher. Instead of slinging sausages at WordGirl and Huggy, the Butcher is running eager contestants through a verbal meat grinder. †† - This is the second episode that uses this word, (The first was episode 25).
111a	7a	"A Curious Case of Curiosity"	Privacy, Interrogate	Kevin Pederson	Ms. Question	Collection	December 3, 2014	703A
111b	7b	"There's No V in Team"	Swipe, Triumph	Andrew Samson	Victoria Best	Collection (bonus round)	December 3, 2014	703B
112a	8a	"Sparkling Clean"	Shirk, Unruly	Eric Ledgin	N/A	Elegant	December 5, 2014	704A
Note: This is the first and only segment that doesn't include any villains.
112b	8b	"The Smile Collector"	Unique, Repulsive	Ethan Banville	Chuck the Evil Sandwich Making Guy	Elegant (bonus round)	December 5, 2014	704B
113a	9a	"My Dad, My Teacher, My Dad, My Teacher"	Faculty, Expect	Jayne Hamil	The Butcher and Kid Potato	Imitate	December 17, 2014	705A
113b	9b	"The Power of Whamship"	Collaborate †, Solo	Eric Ledgin	The Whammer and Invisi-Bill	Imitate (bonus round)	December 17, 2014	705B
† - This is the second episode that uses this word, (The first was episode 23).
114a	10a	"Royally Framed"	Vain, Knickknack	Craig Carlisle	Lady Redundant Woman and Royal Dandy	Wedged	January 12, 2015	713A
114b	10b	"WordGirl vs. Tobey vs. the Dentist"	Appointment, Cavity	Ryan and Steve Young	Theodore "Tobey" MacCallister III	Wedged (bonus round)	January 12, 2015	713B
115a	11a	"Accordion to Tradition"	Hesitate, Select	Tom Martin	Granny May	Bewilder	January 16, 2015	710A
115b	11b	"Can't Touch This"	Property, Tinker	Amy Mass	The Whammer	Bewilder (bonus round)	January 16, 2015	710B
116a	12a	"Backyard Camping"	Portable, Farfetched	Guy Toubes	Energy Monster	Perspire	February 6, 2015	706A
116b	12b	"Castle! Dungeon! Fortress! So?"	Absorbed, Include	Danielle Koenig	Chuck the Evil Sandwich Making Guy	Perspire (bonus round)	February 6, 2015	706B
117a	13a	"News Girl"	Expose, Details	Ben Zelevansky	Energy Monster	Binoculars	February 20, 2015	707A
117b	13b	"Diorama Drama: The Scene of the Crime"	Confront, Diorama	Douglas Reid	The Amazing Rope Guy	Binoculars (bonus round)	February 20, 2015	707B
