= WordGirl season 5 =

WordGirl
- Season 5
- No. of episodes: 13 (25 segments)

Release
- Original network: PBS Kids Go!
- Original release: September 10, 2012 – June 14, 2013

Season chronology
- ← Previous; Season 4 Next → Season 6

The fifth season of the animated series WordGirl was originally broadcast on PBS Kids Go! in the United States from September 10, 2012, to June 14, 2013. This is the first season where May I Have a Word does not have new episodes. The fifth season contained 13 episodes (25 segments).

== Cast ==
Cast	Characters
Dannah Phirman	Becky Botsford/WordGirl, Claire McCallister, Chuck's Mom, Edith Von Housenhous, Pretty Princess
Chris Parnell	Narrator, Henchmen #1, Museum Security Guard, Exposition Guy
James Adomian	Bob/Captain Huggy Face, Chip Von Dumor, Harry Kempel, Hal Hardbargain
Jack D. Ferraiolo	The Butcher
Fred Stoller	Chuck the Evil Sandwich Making Guy
Cree Summer	Granny May
Patton Oswalt	Theodore "Tobey" McCallister the Third, Robots
Tom Kenny	Dr. Two-Brains, TJ Botsford, Warden Chalmers, Brent the Handsome Successful Everyone Loves Him Sandwich Making Guy
Jeffrey Tambor	Mr. Big
John C. McGinley	The Whammer
Maria Bamford	Violet Heaslip, Sally Botsford, Leslie
Grey DeLisle	Lady Redundant Woman, Ms. Question
Pamela Adlon	Eileen aka The Birthday Girl
Ryan Raddatz	Todd "Scoops" Ming, Tim Botsford
Larry Murphy	The Amazing Rope Guy, African-American Cop, Anthony the News Reporter
Jen Cohn	Female Bank Teller
Ron Lynch	The Mayor
H. Jon Benjamin	Reginald the Jewelry Store Clerk, Invisi-Bill
Mike O'Connell	Grocery Store Manager, Big Left Hand Guy

=== May I Have a Word cast ===
May I Have a Word cast	Characters
J. D. Cerna	Beau Handsome
Tom Kenny	Phil
Orlando Brown	Tommy
Kelly Miyahara	Emily
James Adomian	Captain Huggy Face

== Episodes ==
No. overall	No. in season	Title	Vocab words	Written by	Villains	May I Have a Word?	Original release date	Prod. code
81a	1a	"Seize the Cheese"	Seize, Savor	Scott Ganz and Andrew Samson	Dr. Two-Brains	Apprehend	September 10, 2012	501A
One day, Dr. Two-Brains and his henchman set off to do some apple picking. His scheme was easy, using his brand-new ray: The Cheese Seizer.
81b	1b	"Ms. Question's Riddle Rampage"	Stranded, Puzzled	Ryan Raddatz	Ms. Question and Theodore "Tobey" McCallister III (cameo)	Apprehend (bonus round)	September 10, 2012	501B
The Botsford family gets stuck in traffic, Ms. Question has a toll that citizens must answer the riddles. However, everyone is stranded, but WordGirl is able to defeat Ms. Question by answering some riddles.
82a	2a	"The Meaty Dimension"	Portal, Overpower	Jack Ferraiolo	The Butcher	Perspire	September 11, 2012	502A
Reading a book from his father Kid Potato, The Butcher learns about a dimension where his powers derive from. He plans to trap Captain Huggyface there in order to defeat WordGirl.
82b	2b	"The Case of the Copied Mrs. Botsford"	Gripe, Convince	Carla Filisha	Lady Redundant Woman	Perspire (bonus round)	September 11, 2012	502B
Lady Redundant Woman creates clones of Mrs. Botsford and other important people in order to frame the real ones for her heists.
83a	3a	"The Good, The Bad, and the Chucky"	Pursue, Yearn	Douglas Reid	Chuck the Evil Sandwich Making Guy and Dr. Two-Brains	Clutch	September 12, 2012	503A
Chuck the Evil Sandwich Making Guy tries to go straight again. This time, he has started a chuck wagon business where he sells grilled cheese. Unfortunately for him, it attracts the attention of Dr. Two-Brains and his henchmen.
83b	3b	"Granny's Pet Plan"	Accessory, Misplace	Jayne Hamil	Granny May	Clutch (bonus round)	September 12, 2012	503B
It seems that Granny May has given up a life of crimes to knit cute little scarves for pets. But then everyone in the city begins to misplace their things. This time, WordGirl figures out if people are losing their possessions or if someone minds.
84a	4a	"Hard-Learned Money"	Divvy, Repetitive	Eric Ledgin	The Learnerer and The Amazing Rope Guy	Console	September 13, 2012	504A
After The Learnerer breaks out of jail by helping Amazing Rope Guy. They both learned how to rob certain stores efficiently and it's too much timing. WordGirl figures out his plan and possibly is able to defeat her. Special Guest Star: Weird Al Yankovic as The Learnerer
84b	4b	"Gift Pony"	Woozy, Brooch	Brian Swenlin	The Whammer	Console (bonus round)	September 13, 2012	504B
Violet gives Becky a brooch made of mysterious gemstones, she begins to feel sick. However, The Whammer destroys the city and then WordGirl stops it, she figures out that the brooch is made of Lexonite, a stone that drains her power.
85a	5a	"Scary with a Side of Butter"	Legend, Artichoke	Jayne Hamil	Mr. Big	Flicker	October 29, 2012	505A
After telling the tale of the giant evil artichoke, Bampy Botsford sparks a panic throughout the city. Mr. Big (who doesn't believe the tale) uses this opportunity to become even richer and more powerful. The giant artichoke really shows up or will Mr. Big finally find a way to control the minds of citizens. Special Guest Star: Tim Conway as Bampy Botsford
85b	5b	"Talent Show Tobey"	Discombobulated, Essential	Ryan Raddatz	Theodore "Tobey" MacCallister III	Flicker (bonus round)	October 29, 2012	505B
Becky volunteers to be Scoops' assistant for his magic act in the talent show. But when Tobey tricks WordGirl into performing his poetry at the talent show, she has to find a way to be on stage as Becky and WordGirl at the same time–all while saving the city from Tobey's latest robot.
86a	6a	"Don't Mess with the Best"	Defeat, Unstoppable	Scott Ganz and Andrew Samson	Victoria Best	Cower	December 28, 2012	506A
Since Victoria Best couldn't outdo WordGirl at being a superhero she decides to become the cities' best villain forever. Using her magic recorder, she steals all of the villains' weaponry–therefore, WordGirl decides to stop Victoria from being the one who takes down once and for all. Special Guest Star: Kirsten Schaal as Victoria Best
86b	6b	"Peanut Butter Battles"	Envelop, Hinder	Stephen Sustarsic	Chuck the Evil Sandwich Making Guy	Cower (bonus round)	December 28, 2012	506B
Chuck adds a new condiment to his arsenal: peanut butter, the highly sticky substance envelops its victims in a giant ball of peanut butter. Since Huggy has to roll a peanut butter covered WordGirl around town, she tries to be able to stop him.
87a	7a	"Hello New Year, Goodbye Moon"	Massive, Resolution	Ryan Raddatz	Dr. Two-Brains	Perspire	December 31, 2012	510A
As New Year's Eve approaches, Dr. Two-Brains plans to turn the Moon into cheese.
87b	7b	"Art in the Park"	Performance, Ruse	Eric Ledgin	Mr. Big	Perspire (bonus round)	December 31, 2012	510B
Mr. Big releases his new book that secretly mind-controls its readers into partaking in his next plot.
88a	8a	"Plain Old Mischief Makers"	Diminish, Declare	Eric Ledgin	Invisi-Bill and Big Left Hand Guy	Dangle	March 11, 2013	507A
Big Left Hand Guy and Invisi-Bill receive a letter from the Villain Society that if they don't pull off a successful criminal activity, they will be bumped down to the mischief maker level of the society with Dr. Three-Brains and Raul Demiglasse. With Coach, Timmy Tim-Bo, and Whammer watching them from a distance, Big Left Hand Guy and Invisi-Bill must pull off a successful criminal activity while contending with WordGirl.
88b	8b	"House Arrest"	Release, Rowdy	Stephen Sustarsic	Chuck the Evil Sandwich Making Guy	Dangle (bonus round)	March 11, 2013	507B
Chuck the Evil Sandwich Making Guy is placed under house arrest at the Botsford's house while his prison cell is undergoing maintenance.
89a	9a	"Monkey Business"	Recall, Zeal	Laurie Israel and Rachel Ruderman	Chuck the Evil Sandwich Making Guy	Apprehend	March 12, 2013	509A
After a battle, WordGirl accidentally leaves Captain Huggy Face behind again. So, he spends the day doing all of his favorite things. When an overzealous Chuck strikes, it's up to Captain Huggy Face to single-handedly save the day.
89b	9b	"Say it Again, Eileen"	Stymie, Guidance	Douglas Reid	Eileen the Birthday Girl	Apprehend (bonus round)	March 12, 2013	509B
Eileen won't stop copying Becky with his own words, however, she enlarges green in frustration before the bake sale is ruined.
90a	10a	"Best Fan Club Meeting Ever"	Rumor, Deadline	George Beckerman, Jack Ferraiolo and Steven Young	The Butcher	Clutch	March 13, 2013	511A
90b	10b	"Day at the Museum"	Divulge, Eavesdrop	Scott Ganz and Andrew Samson	Theodore "Tobey" MacCallister III	Clutch (bonus round)	March 13, 2013	511B
91a	11a	"Who's Your Granny?"	Interact, Contraption	Douglas Reid	Granny May	Console	March 14, 2013	512A
91b	11b	"Win a Day With WordGirl"	Encounter, Squabble	Robyn Brown	Theodore "Tobey" MacCallister III	Console (bonus round)	March 14, 2013	512B
92	12	"Dinner or Consequences"	Feast, Consequences Vanish, Rely	Ryan Raddatz Scott Ganz and Andrew Samson	Dr. Two-Brains and the Energy Monster (Maria)	Flicker	March 15, 2013	513
93a	13a	"Father's Day Dance-a-thon"	Obsevere, Determine	Scott Ganz and Andrew Samson	The Butcher (no crimes committed)	Recline	June 14, 2013	508A
93b	13b	"Big is Botsford's Boss"	Blissful, Expertise	Ryan Raddatz	Mr. Big	Recline (bonus round)	June 14, 2013	508B
