= WordGirl season 2 =

WordGirl
- Season 2
- No. of episodes: 26 (50 segments)

Release
- Original network: PBS Kids Go!
- Original release: November 4, 2008 – July 20, 2010

Season chronology
- ← Previous; Season 1 Next → Season 3

The second season of the animated series WordGirl aired between November 4, 2008 and July 20, 2010 on PBS Kids Go! in the United States. The second season contained 26 episodes (50 segments).

== Cast ==
Cast	Characters
Dannah Phirman	Becky Botsford/WordGirl, Claire McCallister, Chuck's Mom, Edith Von Housenhous, Pretty Princess
Chris Parnell	Narrator, Henchmen #1, Museum Security Guard, Exposition Guy
James Adomian	Bob/Captain Huggy Face, David Driscoll, Raul Demiglasse, Hunter Throbheart, Harry Kempel, Chip Von Dumor
Jack D. Ferraiolo	The Butcher
Fred Stoller	Chuck the Evil Sandwich Making Guy
Cree Summer	Granny May
Patton Oswalt	Theodore "Tobey" McCallister the Third, Robots
Tom Kenny	Dr. Two-Brains, TJ Botsford, Warden Chalmers, Steve McClean
Jeffrey Tambor	Mr. Big
John C. McGinley	The Whammer
Maria Bamford	Violet Heaslip, Sally Botsford, Leslie
Grey DeLisle	Lady Redundant Woman, Ms. Question, Mrs. Ripley
Pamela Adlon	Eileen aka The Birthday Girl
Ryan Raddatz	Todd "Scoops" Ming, Tim Botsford
Larry Murphy	The Amazing Rope Guy, Reporter Stu Brisket, Gold Store Dealer, School Principal, Movie Theater Manager, Security Guard for Movie Theater, Joe the Guard, Used Car Salesman
Jen Cohn	Rich Old Lady, Female Bank Teller, Ms. Champlain
Daran Norris	Seymour Orlando Smooth, Nocan the Contrarian
Ron Lynch	The Mayor
H. Jon Benjamin	Reginald the Jewelry Store Clerk, Invisi-Bill
Jim Gaffigan	Mr. Dudley
Mike O'Connell	Grocery Store Manager, Big Left Hand Guy

=== May I Have a Word cast ===
May I Have a Word cast	Characters
J. D. Cerna	Beau Handsome
Tom Kenny	Phil
Orlando Brown	Tommy
Kelly Miyahara	Emily
James Adomian	Captain Huggy Face

== Episodes ==
No. overall	No. in season	Title	Vocab words	Written by	Villains	May I Have a Word?	Original release date	Prod. code
27a	1a	"A Vote for Becky"	Elect, Candidate	Hugh Fink	Theodore "Tobey" McCallister III	Pounce	November 4, 2008	201A
Mrs. Botsford is running for D.A. and Becky is running for student council president. Tobey decides to run against Becky and uses his robots to distract WordGirl. Becky won the election and saved the city from total robot destruction.
27b	1b	"Class Act"	Ramble, Articulate	Jack Ferraiolo	The Butcher	Pounce (bonus round)	November 4, 2008	201B
The Butcher decides that his "wordiability" is getting in the way of his robbing sprees. So he enrolls in an adult education class to learn to articulate. The Butcher's new speech skills finally give him the advantage he needs to defeat WordGirl and Captain Huggy Face.
28a	2a	"The Two-Brains Boogie"	Shimmy, Indestructible	Jack Ferraiolo	Dr. Two-Brains	Evade	February 16, 2009	202A
Dr. Two-Brains threatens to turn all of the city's buildings into cheese with his new transform-building-into-cheese-inator, and traps WordGirl outside the city limits with a force-field generation device, the energy-bubble-maker-inator. She enlists Mr. Botsford, a previous Boogie-Oogie-Oogie champion (and unbeknownst to him, WordGirl's dad) to attempt to break the force field and try to stop this evil plan and get to the contest on time.
28b	2b	"Field Day Fun with Robo-Tobey"	Authentic, Competition	Ryan Raddatz	Theodore "Tobey" McCallister III	Evade (bonus round)	February 16, 2009	202B
Becky is excited about the big field day competition at school. But when Tobey mysteriously displays extraordinary athletic skill when competing in the events, she suspects something is awry. Becky must figure out Tobey's trick, or else lose her chance at winning the coveted super deluxe teachers-only magic markers.
29a	3a	"Slumber Party Pooper"	Blurt, Nuisance	Will Shepard	Eileen the Birthday Girl	Disguise	February 17, 2009	203A
Becky finally convinces her parents to let her have her first slumber party, they invite Eileen, (a.k.a. The Birthday Girl). Becky must find a way to placate the bratty guest and still have fun at her own party.
29b	3b	"Line Lessons with Lady Redundant Woman"	Impolite, Oodles	Matt Fleckenstein and Tom Martin	Lady Redundant Woman	Disguise (bonus round)	February 17, 2009	203B
When numerous people (including the mayor himself) rudely cut in front of Beatrice Bixby in the lunch line, she becomes enraged, transforms into Lady Redundant Woman, and dispatches her copies to dole out some payback in the form of rude behavior. It's up to WordGirl to put a stop to their impolite ways.
30a	4a	"Mr. Big's Dolls and Dollars"	Constantly, Indignant	Ryan Raddatz	Mr. Big	Fatigued	March 23, 2009	204A
Everyone in the city becomes obsessed with Mr. Big's latest product, the new "Walk and Talk WordGirl Doll". However, the doll misuses and misspells words.
30b	4b	"Great Granny May"	Doting, Evidence	Will Shepard	Granny May	Fatigued (bonus round)	March 23, 2009	204B
After robbing a salon, Granny May is sentenced to house arrest with her mother, Great Granny May. She gets a house arrest, and Granny May's doting mother gets in the way of her crime sprees. Special Guest Star: Rose Abdoo as Great Granny May.
31a	5a	"Theme Park WHAMpage"	Patience, Enthusiastic	Matt Fleckenstein	The Whammer	Stench	March 24, 2009	205A
Becky and Bob are anxiously waiting in line for their chance to ride "The Coaster"–the ultimate new roller coaster ride. But the Whammer's enthusiasm for chocolate-covered hot dogs and hi-striker machines at the park could ruin their day of fun. WordGirl forfeits her chance to ride the coaster in order to stop the Whammer from destroying the park.
31b	5b	"Chuck Makes a Buck"	Stupendous, Edible	Carla Filisha	Chuck the Evil Sandwich Making Guy	Stench (bonus round)	March 24, 2009	205B
WordGirl helps Chuck the Evil Sandwich Making Guy get a job as the spokesman for "Edible Edibles Sandwiches", in hopes that he will give up a life of crime. But even after he gains fame among the city folk, Chuck is determined to show people what a real sandwich is, and that he would rather make sandwiches than be a spokesman. Special Guest Star: Nick Kroll as Reuben Grinder.
32a	6a	"Highway to Havarti"	Leisure, Berserk	John N. Huss	Dr. Two-Brains	Snare	April 30, 2009	206A
The Botsford Family vacation is diverted when Becky discovers that Dr. Two-Brains is going to be performing his latest heist at the International Cheese Exposition.
32b	6b	"Tiny Big"	Fad, Limelight	Kim Samek	Mr. Big and Tiny Big	Snare (bonus round)	April 30, 2009	206B
Mr. Big creates the ultimate teenage idol named "Tiny Big" in order to steal WordGirl's thunder and brainwash the town into spending their money on pop star merchandise. Special Guest Star: James C. Mathis III as Tiny Big
33a	7a	"I Think I'm a Clone Now"	Thesaurus, Malicious	Sergio Cilli and Eric Ledgin	Lady Redundant Woman and Evil Malicious WordGirl Copy	Crestfallen	May 1, 2009	207A
The villainous Lady Redundant Woman concocts an evil plan to destroy WordGirl's reputation. When she creates an evil WordGirl clone, the real WordGirl must prove that she hasn't turned to a life of crime and villainy. Note: The episode was formerly titled "Lady Redundant Woman Copies WordGirl by Duplicating Her".
33b	7b	"Answer All My Questions and Win Stuff"	Contestant, Permission	Jack Ferraiolo	Seymour Orlando Smooth	Crestfallen (bonus round)	May 1, 2009	207B
Seymour Orlando Smooth is the host of the hottest new game show, and Mrs. Botsford is a contestant. WordGirl must find a way to stop the fun and games before Seymour steals all the contestants' money.
34a	8a	"Bonkers for Bingo"	Undefeated, Adore	Ryan Raddatz	Granny May	Silhouette	May 4, 2009	208A
Granny May becomes the city's newest bingo champion. WordGirl challenges her in a bingo tournament to confirm that she's given up her evil ways.
34b	8b	"The Ballad of Steve McClean"	Snazzy, Heist	Will Shepard	Dr. Two-Brains and Steve McClean	Silhouette (bonus round)	May 4, 2009	208B
Snazzy, cool, and sanitized Steve McClean, a new villain, appears in town. Dr. Two-Brains teams-up with WordGirl in order to defeat Steve McClean, restore order, and reclaim his status as the city's number one villain. Special Guest Star: Jill Talley as Supervillain Reporter
35a	9a	"Pretty Princess Premiere"	Anticipate, Premiere	Hugh Fink	Energy Monster	Hover	June 19, 2009	210A
After WordGirl defeats the Energy Monster at an electronics/frozen yogurt superstore, it wreaks havoc at the premiere of The Pretty Princess and Magic Pony Movie. Becky is able to see the movie because the Energy Monster spoils the party.
35b	9b	"Where's Huggy?"	Rehearse, Shrug	Carla Filisha	The Butcher (no crimes committed)	Hover (bonus round)	June 19, 2009	210B
As they rehearse their ventriloquist act for the annual Pet Talent Show, Bob (a.k.a. Captain Huggyface) runs away from Becky (a.k.a. WordGirl). WordGirl tracks down her missing sidekick by making house calls to the evil villains' lairs, ultimately winding up at The Butcher's hideout.
36a	10a	"Robo-Camping"	Independent, Serene	Sergio Cilli and Eric Ledgin	Theodore "Tobey" McCallister III	Tiff	July 13, 2009	211A
It's off to the woods for a serene camping trip with Becky, Violet, Tobey and his robots. While the other campers attempt to rough it, Tobey commands his robots to do all of his tasks and create a luxurious weekend free from work. Tobey and his robots survive when an unexpected thunderstorm hits.
36b	10b	"The Stew, the Proud..."	Overdue, Arrogant	Will Shepard	The Butcher and Raul Demiglasse	Tiff (bonus round)	July 13, 2009	211B
Time is running out for Becky to return her library books and maintain her perfect record when Raul Demiglasse and the Butcher go head-to-head in a culinary showdown. Special Guest Star: Andy Dick as Milt and Judy Greer as Mrs. Dewey.
37a	11a	"Who Wants Candy?"	Awestruck, Mastermind	John N. Huss	Eileen the Birthday Girl	Evade	July 14, 2009	212A
On a field trip to the local candy factory, The Birthday Girl goes on a candy eating spree. WordGirl must find a way to save the city's candy and win back her best friend and field trip girlfriend Violet. Special Guest Star: Matt Besser as Zachary Zany.
37b	11b	"Chuck's Brother"	Sibling, Envious	Carla Filisha	Chuck the Evil Sandwich Making Guy	Evade (bonus round)	July 14, 2009	212B
Chuck's successful brother, Brent, is in town and being honored for his latest invention: crustless bread. As the city prepares for the celebration, Chuck's envy gets the better of him. Then WordGirl stops Chuck from stealing the precious Golden Sandwich Award.
38a	12a	"Becky and the Bard"	Shimmer, Memorize	Ryan Raddatz	Energy Monster	Disguise	September 7, 2009	213A
Violet and Becky compete for the coveted role of Juliet to play opposite the dreamy Hunter Throbheart in the school's production of Romeo and Juliet. Violet is cast as Juliet while Becky is the understudy. When the Energy Monster captures Violet, Becky must choose between the role of a lifetime and saving her friend.
38b	12b	"Monkey-Robot Showdown"	Champion, Vanquish	John N. Huss	Theodore "Tobey" McCallister III	Disguise (bonus round)	September 7, 2009	213B
The city is hosting the Big Checker Championship and Bob has to face off against Tobey's Robot, the Checkmate 3000. When Tobey puts the pressure on to win, his robot snaps and WordGirl and Captain Huggy Face must team up to stop the Checkmate 3000 from destroying the city. Special Guest Star: Danielle Schneider as Loretta Sanchez-Johnson and Matt Besser as Rex the News Reporter.
39	13	"The Wrong Side of the Law"	Examine, Priceless Guilty, Objection	Eric Ledgin (Part 1) Scott Ganz and Andrew Samson (Part 2)	Eileen the Birthday Girl	Fatigued	October 12, 2009	214
The Birthday Girl steals a priceless collection of Pretty Princess figurines from the jewelry store. In an unexpected turn of events Eileen (a.k.a. the Birthday Girl) charms Police Commissioner Watson and convinces him that WordGirl is the culprit. Special Guest Star: Wayne Knight as Police Commissioner Watson. WordGirl is stuck in jail, framed and falsely accused of stealing the priceless collection of Pretty Princess figurines while the villains of the city are running amok. That happens when WordGirl gets cross-examined by her mom in court, but she will be able to prove her innocence, save the city from chaos, and apprehend The Birthday Girl. Note 1: The episode was formerly titled "Law and Order." Note 2: This episode is also the first 22-minute special for the show.
40a	14a	"Two-Brains Quartet"	Melodious, Quartet	Sergio Cilli	Dr. Two-Brains	Stench	October 13, 2009	215A
For the city's centennial celebration, the Mayor promises to unveil its 100-year-old cheese wheel to the winner of the Barbershop Quartet Competition. Both the Botsford family and Dr. Two-Brains are assembling talented groups. Dr. Two-Brains is able to sing his way to victory and run away with the city's oldest and most valuable cheese.
40b	14b	"Big's Big Bounce"	Boost, Tempting	Ryan Raddatz	Mr. Big	Stench (bonus round)	October 13, 2009	215B
Becky and Bob join the City Scout Troop only to discover Mr. Big is the Guest Troop Leader. He vows to motivate Troop 865 to sell the most granola bars in order to win the world famous Mega-Jump Trampoline.
41a	15a	"The Young and the Meatless"	Duplicate, Interruption	Jack Ferraiolo	The Butcher and Lady Redundant Woman	Snare	October 14, 2009	216A
Sparks fly when the Butcher meets Lady Redundant Woman's copy Dupey. Lady Redundant Woman is annoyed by the union between one of her copies and the meat-wielding villain.
41b	15b	"Mr. Big's Colossal Mini-Golf"	Colossal, Scoff	Kim Samek	Mr. Big	Snare (bonus round)	October 14, 2009	216B
There's a new villain in town–Guy Rich, a super rich evil businessman. Everyone is impressed by Guy, everyone except Mr. Big. Mr. Big schemes to win back the spotlight by building a Colossal Mini Golf Course. To make this happen, he puts his fellow evil villains under mind control. Special Guest Star: William Mapother as Guy Rich.
42a	16a	"Nocan the Contrarian"	Contrary, Exquisite	Ryan Raddatz	Nocan the Contrarian	Crestfallen	October 15, 2009	217A
Mr. Botsford wins the role of "Mayor for the Day" just as WordGirl's newest villain Nocan the Contrarian lands ashore. When WordGirl says "down" and Nocan says "up". When WordGirl says "attack" and Nocan says "defend" followed by a barbaric yell. WordGirl has to find his weakness in order to restore the city to normalcy.
42b	16b	"Meat My Dad"	Nemesis, Badger	Jack Ferraiolo	The Butcher and Kid Potato	Crestfallen (bonus round)	October 15, 2009	217B
When the Butcher's Dad "Kid Potato" appears on the scene, they unite to create the ultimate supervillain team: "Meat and Potatoes!" Quality father-son time gets on the Butcher's nerves, but somehow they still find a way to break the law. Special Guest Star: Ed Asner as Kid Potato.
43a	17a	"Tobey's Tricks and Treats"	Eerie, Supernatural	Kim Samek	Theodore "Tobey" McCallister III	Petrified	October 23, 2009	209A
Tobey loses the costume contest at school, and so, ever the sore loser, he devises a plan to steal all the Halloween candy. Becky and Violet (in her WordGirl costume) must find a way to stop his giant robots before they ruin Halloween for everyone.
43b	17b	"Escape Wham"	Potential, Boisterous	Jack Ferraiolo	Chuck the Evil Sandwich Making Guy and The Whammer	Petrified (bonus round)	October 23, 2009	209B
Chuck the Evil Sandwich Making Guy and The Whammer both attempt to steal priceless Henry VIII artifacts. WordGirl assumes that once again, they're partners in crime–however, both Chuck and The Whammer battle each other.
44a	18a	"Who is Ms. Question?"	Inquire, Hilarious	Eric Ledgin	Ms. Question	Silhouette	November 23, 2009	218A
The Coach certainly doesn't think so when he eliminates Ms. Question from Villain School. When lightning strikes and gives Ms. Question a new ability, WordGirl is going to have to dodge more than just questions in order to stop her. Special Guest Star: Ned Bellamy as the Coach.
44b	18b	"Lunch Lady Chuck"	Disorderly, Famished	John N. Huss	Chuck the Evil Sandwich Making Guy	Silhouette (bonus round)	November 23, 2009	218B
Rather than spend his time in jail, Chuck is recruited to serve in the cafeteria at Becky's school. Chuck wows the students with superb sandwiches but things turn ugly when the principal tells him that he must have a hair bonnet. Wordgirl must find one that'll fit Chuck's head and help him remember the password for the crusher before the school gets destroyed.
45a	19a	"Oh, Holiday Cheese"	Curmudgeon, Festivity	Carla Filisha	Dr. Two-Brains	Petrified	December 10, 2009	219A
The Botsfords kick off the holiday festivities with a cheese party. With lots of cheese and sing-a-longs, the party is a huge success until Dr. Two-Brains shows up with his cheese-swipe-inator. WordGirl saves the party and gets Dr. Two-Brains into the holiday spirit.
45b	19b	"Ch-ch-ch-Change Day"	Quandary, Fidget	Patrick Downie	The Butcher	Petrified (bonus round)	December 10, 2009	219B
Everyone is bringing their loose change to the bank to convert it into savings. However, when the Butcher locks Becky and Bob in the vault, the city's police officers are able to stop him when WordGirl can't come to the rescue.
46	20	"WordGirl Makes a Mistake"	Flawless, Dominate Potent †, Mission	Kim Samek (Part 1) Adam F. Goldberg and Chris Bishop (Part 2)	Mr. Big	Hover	December 28, 2009	220
While WordGirl is stopping Mr. Big's latest plan, she is caught mispronouncing words. Mr. Big exposes WordGirl to her weakness, lexonite, a meteor from her home world. Now Mr. Big is on the moon, ready to complete his mission. WordGirl gets out of this situation and stops Mr. Big's plan. † - This is the second episode that uses this word, (The first was episode 13). May I Have a Word?: Hover Note: This is the second 22-minute special for the show.
47a	21a	"Opposite Day"	Extravaganza, Antonym	Ryan Raddatz	Nocan the Contrarian	Evade	February 15, 2010	222A
Nocan the Contrarian intrudes on Becky's Opposite Day party.
47b	21b	"Granny's Book Club"	Feisty, Retire	Carla Filisha	Granny May	Evade (bonus round)	February 15, 2010	222B
Granny May tries to capture WordGirl by using book club bait.
48a	22a	"Earth Day Girl"	Recycle, Excess	John N. Huss	Eileen the Birthday Girl	Tiff	March 1, 2010	221A
When Eileen learns that the Earth is having a special celebration (on her birthday), she decides to teach the Earth a lesson. WordGirl finds a way to stop the Birthday Girl and save Earth Day. Special Guest Star: Kevin McDonald as the Baker.
48b	22b	"A Hero, a Thief, a Store and Its Owner"	Version, Recollect	Jack Ferraiolo	Chuck the Evil Sandwich Making Guy	Tiff (bonus round)	March 1, 2010	221B
An officer arrives at the Jewelry Store only to find Reginald, Chuck, Captain Huggy Face, and WordGirl encased in condiments. He questions everyone, but uncovering the truth from a superhero, a villain, a monkey and a dramatic jewelry store clerk isn't as easy as it sounds, as everyone has their own, not necessarily true, version of the story. Special Guest Star: Brian Doyle-Murray as the Police Officer.
49a	23a	"Wham Up"	Assist, Blunder	Eric Ledgin	The Whammer	Disguise	May 3, 2010	223A
The Whammer is on a mission to become WordGirl's new sidekick. When he whams Captain Huggy Face into outer space, WordGirl must find a way to rescue Huggy and put the Whammer back in the slammer. Special Guest Star: Danielle Schneider as Loretta Sanchez-Johnson and Kevin McDonald as the Baker.
49b	23b	"Seeds of Doubt"	Doubt, Refresh	Rick Groel	Ms. Question	Disguise (bonus round)	May 3, 2010	223B
Ms. Question is scheming to steal the world-famous statue of the Ponderer in order to update her lair, but she has to get past Joe the Guard. Ms. Question spreads seeds of doubt on Joe's bagel and throughout the museum so she can distract Joe and steal the statue. WordGirl defeated Ms. Question's seeds of doubt and saved the statue.
50a	24a	"Wishful Thinking"	Gleaming, Hoodwinked	Bruce Clark	Seymour Orlando Smooth	Fatigued	May 4, 2010	224A
Becky teams with TJ to bring down smooth-talking Seymour Orlando Smooth, who's tricking audience members of his show into giving him money.
50b	24b	"Lady Redundant Woman Gets the Blues"	Admire, Greedy	Sergio Cilli	Lady Redundant Woman and Royal Dandy	Fatigued (bonus round)	May 4, 2010	224B
Beatrice Bixby helps a kid named Royal Dandy from a painting come to life, but he turns out to be a brat. Special Guest Star: Sergio Cilli as Royal Dandy.
51a	25a	"Win a Shiny New Car"	Legitimate, Elated	Scott Ganz and Andrew Samson	Seymour Orlando Smooth	Stench	July 19, 2010	225A
Mrs. Botsford is a contestant on Seymour Smooth's new show "Win a Shiny New Car." When Becky realizes the other contestants are cheating for Smooth, she has to save her Mom from being tricked again. Therefore, Becky helps her mom win the challenge and defeat Seymour Smooth.
51b	25b	"The People vs. Ms. Question"	Befuddled, Justice	Carla Filisha	Ms. Question	Stench (bonus round)	July 19, 2010	225B
When WordGirl puts Ms. Question on the stand, she confuses District Attorney Botsford so much that she forgets why she became a lawyer. WordGirl has to help her mom return to her quest for justice and stop Ms. Question's tirade of inquiries.
52a	26a	"Oh, What a Tangled Knot You Tie, Amazing Rope Guy"	Imposter, Untangle	Eric Ledgin	The Amazing Rope Guy	Snare	July 20, 2010	226A
As a villain, the Amazing Rope Guy is not so amazing. He discovers that his true talent is mimicking others. When he goes on a crime spree impersonating all of the villains of the city, WordGirl must find a way to end his career as an impostor. Special Guest Star: Danielle Schneider as Loretta Sanchez-Johnson and Matt Besser as Rex the News Reporter.
52b	26b	"Kids Action News"	Tantalizing, United	Ryan Raddatz	Chuck the Evil Sandwich Making Guy and Dr. Two-Brains	Snare (bonus round)	July 20, 2010	226B
This just in: Becky, Scoops, and Violet won a chance to host Kids Action News at Noon. While covering a story of the largest grilled cheese sandwich, WordGirl swoops in to stop Chuck and Dr. Two-Brains from snagging the sandwich. WordGirl and Captain Huggy Face team up again to save the sandwich, the city, and the news hour.
