= WordGirl season 3 =

WordGirl
- Season 3
- No. of episodes: 13 (25 segments)

Release
- Original network: PBS Kids Go!
- Original release: September 7, 2010 – July 8, 2011

Season chronology
- ← Previous; Season 2 Next → Season 4

The third season of the animated series WordGirl was originally broadcast on PBS Kids Go! in the United States from September 7, 2010 to July 8, 2011. The third season contained 13 episodes (25 segments).

== Cast ==
Cast	Characters
Dannah Phirman	Becky Botsford/WordGirl, Claire McCallister, Chuck's Mom, Edith Von Housenhous, Pretty Princess
Chris Parnell	Narrator, Henchmen #1, Museum Security Guard, Exposition Guy
James Adomian	Bob/Captain Huggy Face
Jack D. Ferraiolo	The Butcher
Fred Stoller	Chuck the Evil Sandwich Making Guy
Cree Summer	Granny May
Patton Oswalt	Theodore "Tobey" McCallister the Third, Robots
Tom Kenny	Dr. Two-Brains, TJ Botsford, Warden Chalmers, Brent the Handsome Successful Everyone Loves Him Sandwich Making Guy
Jeffrey Tambor	Mr. Big
John C. McGinley	The Whammer
Maria Bamford	Violet Heaslip, Sally Botsford, Leslie, Mrs. Best
Grey DeLisle	Lady Redundant Woman, Ms. Question
Pamela Adlon	Eileen aka The Birthday Girl
Ryan Raddatz	Todd "Scoops" Ming, Tim Botsford
Larry Murphy	The Amazing Rope Guy, Gold Store Dealer, School Principal, Soccer Referee, Mr. Best, Blackbeard's Buffett Manager, Anthony the News Reporter
Jen Cohn	Female Bank Teller
Daran Norris	Seymour Orlando Smooth, Nocan the Contrarian
Ron Lynch	The Mayor
H. Jon Benjamin	Reginald the Jewelry Store Clerk, Invisi-Bill
Amy Sedaris	Mrs. Davis
Mike O'Connell	Grocery Store Manager, Big Left Hand Guy

=== May I Have a Word cast ===
May I Have a Word cast	Characters
J. D. Cerna	Beau Handsome
Tom Kenny	Phil
Orlando Brown	Tommy
Kelly Miyahara	Emily
James Adomian	Captain Huggy Face

== Episodes ==
No. overall	No. in season	Title	Vocab words	Written by	Villains	May I Have a Word?	Original release date	Prod. code
53a	1a	"Bummertime"	Prolong, Aggravated	John N. Huss	Theodore "Tobey" McCallister III	Collection	September 7, 2010	301A
On the last day of her summer vacation, Becky tries to read her book in peace but is interrupted by Tobey and his new robot Chronos.
53b	1b	"The Homerun King"	Extraordinary, Fortunate(ly)	Ryan Raddatz	Dr. Two-Brains	Collection (bonus round)	September 7, 2010	301B
TJ becomes a superhero named The Home Run King when he manages to prevent a crime during a game of baseball. He begins to get into trouble and needs help from WordGirl to stop crime.
54a	2a	"Granny and Clyde"	Injury, Spree	Carla Filisha	Granny May	Doze	September 13, 2010	302A
Mr. Botsford, WordGirl's father, becomes an unwitting getaway driver for Granny May. Note: The title of the episode is the reference of Bonnie and Clyde.
54b	2b	"Too Loud Crew"	Considerate, Manual	Jack Ferraiolo	The Butcher and The Whammer	Doze (bonus round)	September 13, 2010	302B
The Butcher and The Whammer team up and attempt to outdo each other to prove they are not the sidekick.
55a	3a	"The Invisi-Bill Hand"	Conceal, Acknowledge	Eric Ledgin	Invisi-Bill and Big Left Hand Guy	Elegant	September 14, 2010	303A
Invisi-Bill and Big Left Hand Guy begin to work together, but the former becomes jealous of the attention Big Left Hand Guy is receiving. WordGirl attempts to use this fact to defeat the criminals.
55b	3b	"Birthday Town"	Mimic, Hoopla	Sergio Cilli and Tom Martin	Mr. Big and Eileen the Birthday Girl	Elegant (bonus round)	September 14, 2010	303B
Mr. Big uses a machine to control the minds of parents, so they believe every day is their child's birthday and purchase goods at his shop. Things get worse when it affects Birthday Girl.
56a	4a	"The Pretty Princess and Mr. Big Power Hour"	Dupe, Hoist	Eric Ledgin	Mr. Big	Shatter	September 15, 2010	304A
WordGirl gets to be featured in an episode of "Pretty Princess", but this is part of an evil plot by Mr. Big.
56b	4b	"Clean Up in Aisle Eleven"	Debate, Substitute	Ryan Raddatz	Lady Redundant Woman	Shatter (bonus round)	September 15, 2010	304B
Becky is at a debate club so Bob pretends to be WordGirl at the opening of a grocery store. Lady Redundant Woman and her clones cause Becky to abandon the debate club to fight crime.
57a	5a	"When Chuck's Mom Is Away..."	Reckless, Immaculate	Jack Ferraiolo	Dr. Two-Brains, Dr. Two-Brains' Henchmen, Lady Redundant Woman, Butcher, Big Left Hand Guy, Mr. Big, Leslie, Amazing Rope Guy, Coach, Eileen the Birthday Girl, Granny May, Theodore "Tobey" McCallister III, and Seymour Orlando Smooth	Smudge	September 16, 2010	305A
Dr. Two-Brains discovers that Chuck is in his house alone and tells all the villains to visit Chuck's home. Chuck joins forces with WordGirl to defeat the other criminals.
57b	5b	"That's Entertainment"	Entertainment, Persistent	Carla Filisha	Energy Monster	Smudge (bonus round)	September 16, 2010	305B
The Energy Monster escapes from prison, interrupting the Botsfords while watching the television–WordGirl tries to find and arrest the Energy Monster while the rest of the family explore different forms of entertainment.
58a	6a	"Victoria Best"	Trophy, Boast	Scott Ganz and Andrew Samson	Victoria Best	Binoculars	October 11, 2010	306A
Victoria Best arrives at school and wins almost every award in an assembly. Becky's trophy is stolen and WordGirl and Captain Huggy Face start a contest to try to get her trophy back. Special Guest Star: Kirsten Schaal as Victoria Best
58b	6b	"Showdown at the Secret Spaceship Hideout"	Frolic, Procrastinate	Ryan and Steve Young	Dr. Two-Brains	Binoculars (bonus round)	October 11, 2010	306B
Dr. Two-Brains accidentally sends himself and his henchmen to sleep with a machine when trying to fight WordGirl–they wake up in WordGirl's spaceship. WordGirl has to fight them to get control of the machine that sends people to sleep, as well as her spaceship.
59a	7a	"Captain Tangent"	Valuable, Tangent	John N. Huss	Captain Tangent	Imitate	November 8, 2010	307A
Becky and her family go out to dinner at Blackbeard's Buffet, where they encounter a new villain Captain Tangent–a teenage pirate with a magnetic hook, a talking parrot, and a tendency to ramble. It's up to WordGirl to stop him from stealing all the doubloons, er, coins in the city. Special Guest Star: John Henson as Captain Tangent
59b	7b	"Chuck and Brent Ride Again"	Confidence, Zest	Carla Filisha	Chuck the Evil Sandwich Making Guy	Imitate (bonus round)	November 8, 2010	307B
Chuck the Evil Sandwich-Making Guy's famous brother Brent the Handsome Successful Everyone-Loves-Him Sandwich-Making Guy is in a slump; he's lost his confidence. Chuck happily takes him under his wing and tries to make Brent his new evil sidekick. On a routine robbery at the sub shop, Brent gets sidetracked by owner Reuben Grinder who wants to talk about innovations in sandwich-making. Special Guest Star: Nick Kroll as Reuben Grinder
60a	8a	"Bend It Like Becky"	Ricochet, Dismay(ed)	Scott Ganz and Andrew Samson	Dr. Two-Brains	Bewilder	December 20, 2010	308A
Becky's new soccer team, the Butterfly Unicorn Laser Gorillas and Dr. Two-Brains clash on the soccer field when they both realize they booked it for the same day. The two teams must play a winner-take-all soccer match to determine who gets control of the field. Note: The title of the episode is the reference of Bend It Like Beckham.
60b	8b	"Questionable Behavior"	Fluster, Confess	Rick Groel	Ms. Question	Bewilder (bonus round)	December 20, 2010	308B
Ms. Question's powers are at an all-time high now that she's discovered she can get people to tell her their deepest, darkest secrets. Ms. Question will be able to blackmail everyone in the city–including WordGirl. Our favorite superhero and her monkey sidekick must stop Ms. Question by giving her a taste of her own medicine.
61a	9a	"Bampy Battles Bots"	Invincible, Fiction(al)	Ryan Raddatz	Theodore Tobey McCallister III	Collection	January 17, 2011	311A
The Botsford family meets Becky and TJ's grandfather, Bampy. While Claire McCallister pulls Tobey's ear, TJ plays with the new screwdriver. Special Guest Star: Tim Conway as Bampy Botsford
61b	9b	"Truth, Revision, and the Lexicon Way"	Revise/Revision, Mislead(ing)	Shane Casey	Mr. Big	Collection (bonus round)	January 17, 2011	311B
Mr. Big takes control of the school newspaper and threatens to reveal WordGirl's secret identity.
62a	10a	"Cherish is the Word"	Flee, Cherish	Eric Ledgin	Theodore "Tobey" McCallister III and Victoria Best	Perspire	February 8, 2011	310A
It's Valentine's Day, and Becky is determined to give Scoops a Valentine this year. But with Victoria Best stealing Valentines, and Tobey causing a little chaos of his own, things might get difficult. Special Guest Star: Kirsten Schaal as Victoria Best
62b	10b	"Granny's Intuition"	Intuition, Charming	John N. Huss	Granny May	Perspire (bonus round)	February 8, 2011	310B
When Granny May stops a series of crimes, and claims it's due to her intuition, WordGirl knows the villain hasn't changed her ways. Special Guest Star: Danielle Schneider as Loretta Sanchez-Johnson and Matt Besser as Rex the Reporter
63a	11a	"The Straw That Broke Dr. Two-Brains' Back"	Recreation, Abrupt	Jack Ferraiolo	Dr. Two-Brains	Strenuous	April 1, 2011	309A
Becky is tired of always having to forfeit her recreation time in order to fight crime, so when Two Brains decides to cut into her Pretty Princess documentary, she's in no mood for his antics.
63b	11b	"Nocan the Evil Ingredient Finding Guy"	Scrumptious, Apprentice	Ryan Raddatz	Chuck the Evil Sandwich Making Guy and Nocan the Contrarian	Strenuous (bonus round)	April 1, 2011	309B
After Chuck defeats WordGirl and escapes with a sandwich trophy, he hears on the radio that a sandwich competition is taking place in the city park. He decides to get Nocan the Contrarian to enter the contest in his place while he tells him what to do through a microphone, but Nocan has a tendency to do the opposite of whatever he's asked.
64a	12a	"Meat-Life Crisis"	Mope, Vendor	Rick Groel	The Butcher and Kid Potato	Doze	May 6, 2011	311A
The Butcher apparently gives up his nefarious ways when he goes to work with his dad, Kid Potato, as a food vendor at the ballpark. Note:' The ballpark is a parody of Fenway Park. Special Guest Star: Ed Asner as Kid Potato
64b	12b	"Mobot Knows Best"	Peeved, Communicate	Sergio Cilli	Theodore Tobey McCallister III	Doze (bonus round)	May 6, 2011	311B
Tobey creates a robot to substitute for his mother on parent-teacher conference day.
65	13	"A Better Mousetrap"	Reminisce, Skirmish Cliffhanger, Irk	Ryan Raddatz (Part 1) Eric Ledgin (Part 2)	Dr. Two-Brains	Elegant	July 8, 2011	313
WordGirl gets the chance to be on Scoops' very own talk show. During this segment, WordGirl and Scoops reminisce over the various skirmishes WordGirl has had with Dr. Two-Brains. The segment ends in a cliffhanger when Dr. Two-Brains himself uses his goop ray to take over the show. Dr. Two-Brains takes control and gains back his dignity by humiliating WordGirl. He shows several clips of her and Captain Huggyface being defeated, but WordGirl counters it, stating that they are all cliffhangers. Two-Brains and his henchmen continue to irk WordGirl, but while they're busy laughing she takes the opportunity to take back the show.
