= WordGirl season 8 =

WordGirl
- Season 8
- No. of episodes: 13 (25 segments)

Release
- Original network: PBS Kids
- Original release: June 10 – August 7, 2015

Season chronology
- ← Previous; Season 7

The eighth and final season of the animated series WordGirl was originally broadcast on PBS Kids in the United States between June 10 and August 7, 2015. The eighth and final season contained 13 episodes (25 segments).

== Cast ==
Cast	Characters
Dannah Phirman	Becky Botsford/WordGirl, Claire McCallister, Chuck's Mom, Edith Von Housenhous, Pretty Princess
Chris Parnell	Narrator, Henchmen #1, Museum Security Guard, Exposition Guy, Reason
Fred Stoller	Chuck the Evil Sandwich Making Guy
H. Jon Benjamin	Reginald the Jewelry Store Clerk, Invisi-Bill
Maria Bamford	Violet Heaslip, Sally Botsford, Leslie, Johnson, Loretta-Sanchez Johnson
Patton Oswalt	Theodore "Tobey" McCallister the Third, Robots
Ryan Raddatz	Todd "Scoops" Ming, Tim Botsford
Tom Kenny	Dr. Two-Brains, TJ Botsford, Warden Chalmers, Brent the Handsome Successful Everyone Loves Him Sandwich Making Guy
Cree Summer	Granny May
Jack D. Ferraiolo	The Butcher
Jeffrey Tambor	Mr. Big
John C. McGinley	The Whammer
Larry Murphy	The Amazing Rope Guy, African-American Cop, Anthony the News Reporter
Pamela Adlon	Eileen aka The Birthday Girl
Amy Sedaris	Rhyme

=== May I Have a Word cast ===
May I Have a Word cast	Characters
J. D. Cerna	Beau Handsome
Tom Kenny	Phil
Orlando Brown	Tommy
Kelly Miyahara	Emily
James Adomian	Captain Huggy Face

== Episodes ==
No. overall	No. in season	Title	Vocab words	Written by	Villains	May I Have a Word?	Original release date	Prod. code
118a	1a	"Patch Game"	Award, Eventually	Ben Zelevansky and Liz Breen	Theodore "Tobey" MacCallister III	Discard	June 10, 2015	805A
The team Scouts can win a patch, except for Tobey yet cannot win and abilities that he is cheating and disqualifies but losing good inventions.
118b	1b	"Girls Day Out Throws Chuck"	Tranquil, Haven	Jayne Hamil and Tom Martin	Chuck the Evil Sandwich Making Guy	Discard (bonus round)	June 10, 2015	805B
119a	2a	"A Sticky Situation"	Adhesive, Precious	Eric Ledgin	Granny May	Scamper	June 12, 2015	808A
119b	2b	"Eight Legs vs. Two-Brains"	Volunteer, Habitat	Melissa Thomas	Dr. Two-Brains	Scamper (bonus round)	June 12, 2015	808B
120a	3a	"World's Best Dad"	Attempt, Combine/Combination	Ryan Raddatz	Victoria Best	Inflate	June 19, 2015	813A
120b	3b	"The Good Old, Bad Old Days"	Hazy, Reminisce	Will Shepard	The Butcher	Inflate (bonus round)	June 19, 2015	813B
121a	4a	"What Would WordGirl Do"	Amuse, Errand	Kevin Pederson	Energy Monster	Wedged	June 26, 2015	806A
121b	4b	"Granny's Corner"	Suggest, Pester	Rick Groel	Granny May	Wedged (bonus round)	June 26, 2015	806B
122a	5a	"Pineapple of My Eye"	Eradicate, Eureka	Phaea Crede and Justin Shatraw	Chuck the Evil Sandwich Making Guy	Irritable	July 8, 2015	803A
122b	5b	"Big Baby"	Hire, Dehydrate	Grant Moran	Mr. Big	Irritable (bonus round)	July 8, 2015	803B
123a	6a	"Staycation"	Balmy, Frigid	Guy Toubes	Mr. Big	Consume	July 10, 2015	804A
123b	6b	"Dr. No-Voice"	Hoarse, Modify	Eric Ledgin and Steve Young	Dr. Two-Brains	Consume (bonus round)	July 10, 2015	804B
124a	7a	"Trustworthy Tobey"	Trustworthy, Shipshape	Ryan Raddatz and Ethan Banville	Theodore "Tobey" MacCallister III	Inflate	July 15, 2015	807A
Becky is missing a book she needs to return to the library which she had lent to Tobey and does not believe him when he says he put it in her bag.
124b	7b	"The Tooth Hurts"	Absent, Mortified	Eric Kentoff	The Butcher	Inflate (bonus round)	July 15, 2015	807B
Becky joins Kylie (coverstory girl) and Omar (headlines boy) to work on the Daily Rag (school paper) while Todd "Scoops" Ming goes to the dentist to get his baby teeth pulled. Meanwhile, the Butcher begins his next plot.
125a	8a	"Time-Out with Two-Brains"	Expire, Pause	Allen Glazier	Dr. Two-Brains	Irritable	July 17, 2015	809A
125b	8b	"Dr. WordGirl-Brains"	Permanent, Exchange	Ryan and Steve Young	Dr. Two-Brains	Irritable (bonus round)	July 17, 2015	809B
126a	9a	"Becky Knows Best"	Compatible, Certain	Carla Filisha	Chuck the Evil Sandwich Making Guy and Ms. Question	Inflate	July 22, 2015	801A
126b	9b	"As Something as Something"	Clutter, Simile	Will Shepard	Seymour Orlando Smooth	Inflate (bonus round)	July 22, 2015	801B
127a	10a	"The Ordinary, Extraordinary Botsfords"	Ordinary, Remarkable	Douglas Reid	The Butcher	Scamper	July 24, 2015	802A
127b	10b	"The Penny, the Pony and the Pirate"	Attend, Rare	Kevin Pederson	Captain Tangent	Scamper (bonus round)	July 24, 2015	802B
128a	11a	"Tim Botsford: Neighborhood Assistant"	Prevent, Assistant	John N. Huss	Chuck the Evil Sandwich Making Guy	Consume	July 31, 2015	810A
128b	11b	"Set Sail for the Bake Sale"	Distant, Transport	Ryan Raddatz	Nocan the Contrarian	Consume (bonus round)	July 31, 2015	810B
129a	12a	"The Best of the Bests"	Ancient, Twist	Eric Ledgin and Steve Young	Victor and Victoria Best	Discard	August 5, 2015	811A
129b	12b	"Art's Parts"	Evasive, Linger	Tom Martin and Liz Breen	The Learnerer	Discard (bonus round)	August 5, 2015	811B
130	13	"Rhyme and Reason"	Harmony, Resolve Forlorn, Chaos	Jack Ferraiolo	Rhyme and Reason (main), Dr. Two Brains, Chuck The Evil Sandwich Making Guy, Granny May, Theodore “Tobey” McCallister the III and the Butcher (cameos)	Wedged	August 7, 2015	812
Rhyme and Reason, a new duo of villains, move into the city to pilfer rhyme-related items, but not long after WordGirl stops them, the two have a fallout and end their relationship. Meanwhile, Violet discovers Becky's secret double life as WordGirl, and feeling betrayed, ends their friendship too. Becky, Violet, Rhyme and Reason are all feeling down now that their friendships are broken, so much so that a depressive Rhyme launches into a forlorn crime spree. With no one left to turn to and still reeling from the events of yesterday, Becky must suit up for what may just be her final battle. Note: This episode is the series finale.
