= Dead Dudes in the House =

- UK VHS cover
- Directed by: James Riffel
- Written by: James Riffel
- Produced by: Mark Bladis; Melisse Lewis; James Riffel
- Starring: James Griffin; John Dayton Cerna; Sarah Newhouse; Douglas Gibson; Victor Verhaeghe; Mark Zobian
- Cinematography: Mark Petersson
- Edited by: Valerie Schwartz
- Music by: William B. Riffel
- Distributed by: Troma Entertainment
- Release date: 1989
- Running time: 94 minutes
- Language: English

Dead Dudes in the House (also known as The Dead Come Home or The House on Tombstone Hill) is a 1989 independent horror film written and directed by James Riffel and distributed by Troma Entertainment. The film follows a group of teenagers who decide to renovate an old, seemingly-abandoned house, unaware that the house is occupied by a murderous old woman and her sultry daughter.

== Plot ==
Mark, his girlfriend Jamie, and their friends Bob, Steve, Ron, Linda and Joey drive to a large, remote house that Mark has recently purchased. The teens intend to renovate the house in order to repurpose it as a hangout spot for them. Whilst surveying the outside of the house, the teens find a gravestone belonging to a woman named Abigail Leatherbee. Without warning, Bob decides to smash the gravestone in order to create more space. Mark and the rest of the teens are visibly annoyed, but decide to brush it off.

After Bob sends Joey out to get beer for him, the teens head inside and begin fixing up the place. All of a sudden, however, they encounter the old lady. Believing she may be lost, Mark goes to escort the lady outside, but is unable to find her after she disappears around a corner. As he continues to look for her upstairs, Mark's friends discover that the front and back doors have suddenly been locked. After Mark fails to return, Jamie goes looking for him, and discovers that the broken gravestone has somehow made its way into an upstairs bedroom. Shortly after, the old lady appears and tells Jamie that she has murdered Mark. Jamie then encounters a bloody, undead Mark, whom threatens to kill her before she knocks him out with a wooden plank.

Downstairs, the rest of the group discover that the windows have also been locked shut, and they find themselves unable to break them even when using heavy objects. After reuniting with Jamie and learning of Mark's fate, the gang decides to gather weapons and wait until Joey returns so he can go get help. As night falls, Joey arrives back at the house, but finds himself unable to get inside. When a window on the third floor of the house opens, Joey grabs a ladder and climbs up to it, only for the old lady to appear and kill him.

As the teens search the house for the old lady, Steve inadvertently gets separated from the rest of the group and encounters an undead Joey, who tells him that he and the others won't be able to escape. Shortly after, Steve is brutally murdered by the old lady. Having overheard his death, Bob becomes determined to find the old lady and kill her, although Jamie insists that they focus on trying to escape. Later, whilst exploring the basement, Jamie and Linda find a newspaper article about Abigail Leatherbee, the mysterious old woman whom was also a former owner of the house. The article reveals that, at some point, Abigail was brutally attacked by a home invader. Although she miraculously survived, her trauma from the encounter drove her insane and eventually led to her murdering her neighbour. Abigail then died of a heart attack a few days later.

As the teens continue searching for a way out, Linda encounters an undead Steve. Believing he miraculously survived, Linda hugs Steve, only for him to murder her. The others find the undead Linda shortly after, and Bob quickly kills her before she can hurt anyone else. Bob then tries to make his escape through a window the survivors managed to open; however, the window slams shut and cuts him in half. Meanwhile, two other teenagers, Ricky and S, decide to go and explore the house for themselves, having heard ghost stories about it. After breaking open the basement door, they head inside, and later encounter Abigail, who murders Ricky. S runs away, but finds himself unable to leave the house. His pounding on the front door alerts Ron, whom goes to investigate the noise. Whilst he is distracted, Jamie is killed and nearly murders Ron after she too comes back from the dead. However, S intervenes and saves Ron at the last second. As the night progresses, Ron and S manage to defeat the undead Steve and Bob before encountering Abigail as they try and make their escape. An intense fight commences, which ultimately ends with Abigail being decapitated. S, however, is mortally wounded and dies.

As dawn breaks, Ron finds that the doors and windows are now unlocked, and weakly stumbles outside. When he turns back around to look at the house, however, an undead S appears with an axe and attacks Ron as he screams in terror.

== Cast ==
- Douglas Gibson as Mark and Abigail Leatherbee
  - Darrell Gibson as Abigail Leatherbee (double)
  - Pam Lewis as the voice of Abigail
- Mark Zobian as Ron
- Sarah Newhouse as Jamie
- Victor Verhaeghe as Bob
- J. D. Cerna as Steve (credited as John Dayton Cerna)
- Naomi Kooker as Linda
- Eugene Sautner as Joey
- Rob Moretti as S
- James Griffith as Ricky

== Home media ==
In 1992, the film was released on VHS by Troma Entertainment and A.I.P. Home Video under the title The House on Tombstone Hill. The film was also released on VHS by Troma as Dead Dudes in the House, with cover art featuring a group of "hip-hop teens", none of whom appear in the film. In 2010, Troma released the film on DVD.

On September 25, 2018, the film was restored and released on DVD and Blu-ray by Vinegar Syndrome as The House on Tombstone Hill.

== See also ==
- List of ghost films
