= WordGirl season 1 =

WordGirl
- Season 1
- No. of episodes: 26 (52 segments)

Release
- Original network: PBS Kids Go!
- Original release: September 3, 2007 – January 2, 2009

Season chronology
- ← Previous; Shorts Next → Season 2

The first season of the animated series WordGirl premiered on September 3, 2007, which was originally broadcast on PBS Kids Go! in the United States until January 2, 2009. The first season contained 26 episodes (52 11-minute segments).

== Cast ==
| Cast | Characters |
|---|---|
| Dannah Phirman | Becky Botsford/WordGirl, Claire McCallister, Chuck's Mom, Edith Von Housenhous, Pretty Princess |
| Chris Parnell | Narrator, Meatloaf, Museum Security Guard, Exposition Guy, Mazo-Racer Driver |
| James Adomian | Bob/Captain Huggy Face, Candlestick Maker, Timmy Tim-Bo |
| Jack D. Ferraiolo | The Butcher |
| Fred Stoller | Chuck the Evil Sandwich Making Guy |
| Cree Summer | Granny May |
| Patton Oswalt | Theodore “Tobey” McCallister III, Robots |
| Tom Kenny | Dr. Two-Brains, TJ Botsford, Warden Chalmers |
| Jeffrey Tambor | Mr. Big |
| John C. McGinley | The Whammer |
| Stephanie Sheh | Lil Mitten |
| Maria Bamford | Violet Heaslip, Sally Botsford, Leslie |
| Ryan Raddatz | Todd “Scoops” Ming, Tim Botsford, Gold Store Dealer |
| Larry Murphy | The Amazing Rope Guy, Reporter Stu Brisket, Zookeeper |
| Jen Cohn | Rich Old Lady, Female Bank Tellers, Ms. Champlain, Ms. Libri |
| Ron Lynch | The Mayor |
| H. Jon Benjamin | Reginald the Jewelry Store Clerk |
| Mike O’Connell | Grocery Store Manager, Big Left Hand Guy, User Car Salesman |

=== May I Have a Word cast ===
| May I Have a Word cast | Characters |
|---|---|
| J. D. Cerna | Beau Handsome |
| Tom Kenny | Phil |
| Orlando Brown | Tommy |
| Kelly Miyahara | Emily |
| James Adomian | Captain Huggy Face |

== Episodes ==
* - This episode's segments did not use verbal instructions to listen for two words that would be used throughout.
* - Premiered as part of the WordGirl Go!-riffic Marathon.
** - This episode is listed as a season 1 episode although it premiered during the second season.

| No. overall | No. in season | Title | Vocab words | Written by | Villains | May I Have a Word? | Original release date | Prod. code |
|---|---|---|---|---|---|---|---|---|
| 1a* | 1a | "Tobey or Consequences" | Enormous, Bicker | Jack Ferraiolo | Theodore "Tobey" McCallister III | Hurl | September 3, 2007 | 101A |
Theodore McCallister III's mom, Claire McCallister, a babysitter, has been assigned to watch over Tobey while she goes on a business trip. Unknown to her, however, he and Becky Botsford (a.k.a. WordGirl) get into a battle of words in the city on a real-live match of the game show called "Crash or Pie", she believes that Tobey is cheating (saying "unsmall" is not a word). Special guest star: Jill Talley as the babysitter
| 1b* | 1b | "High-Fat Robbery" | Impressive, Diversion | Peggy Nicoll | The Butcher | Hurl (bonus round) | September 3, 2007 | 101B |
One day at a park, Becky meets ace reporter Todd "Scoops" Ming, he tells her about becoming a reporter for the Big City Times. The Butcher is making free barbecues to divert the security guards and employees from whatever place he robs. Meanwhile, WordGirl discovers the Butcher's weakness: tofu.
| 2a* | 2a | "You Can't Crush City Hall" | Doomed, Hustle | Kevin Seccia and Jack Ferraiolo | Chuck the Evil Sandwich Making Guy | Pounce | September 14, 2007 | 102A |
The city seems to be doomed when Chuck the Evil Sandwich Making Guy is threatening to crush City Hall with his giant sandwich press, WordGirl is able to stop him by guessing his secret code-word while the time runs out. Meanwhile, Huggy Face dashes off to Attorney Botsford's office, she and the rest of the city are forced to meet his demands.
| 2b* | 2b | "Two-Brain Highway" | Coincidence, Guarantee | Jack Ferraiolo | Dr. Two-Brains | Pounce (bonus round) | September 14, 2007 | 102B |
Professor Steven Boxleitner (a.k.a. Dr Two-Brains) and his henchmen escape from prison and target four events before stealing the rare cheese in the city. WordGirl and Captain Huggy Face aim to stop Two-Brains before he continues to elude capture.
| 3a* | 3a | "Coupon Madness" | Squint, Coupon | Johanna Stein and Will Shepard | Granny May | Stroll | September 21, 2007 | 103A |
Grandolyn Edna May goes on a crime spree by using her coupon printing press to get things for free. It's up to WordGirl to track her down and foil her plan.
| 3b* | 3b | "When Life Gives You Potatoes..." | Transformation, Glum | Johanna Stein and Jack Ferraiolo | Dr. Two-Brains | Stroll (bonus round) | September 21, 2007 | 103B |
Dr. Two-Brains has escaped from prison again, while WordGirl must find him before he perfects his latest weapon–a ray that can turn gold into cheese (luckily, he has so far only succeeded in turning gold into potato salad).
| 4a | 4a | "Jerky Jerk" | Clumsy, Supreme | Jack Ferraiolo | The Butcher | Devour | September 28, 2007 | 104A |
When Becky Botsford and her students are on a school field trip to the museum, the Butcher tries to steal the ancient "Beef Jerky of Supreme Power" artifact on display there, but he has trouble snatching it due to his supreme clumsiness.
| 4b | 4b | "Becky's Birthday" | Appetite, Expand | Chris Karwowski | Energy Monster, Dr. Two-Brains (no crime committed except stealing cheese) | Devour (bonus round) | September 28, 2007 | 104B |
While Tim and Sally are planning a surprise birthday party for Becky. However, she and Captain Huggy Face must battle an expanding energy monster with an appetite for electricity.
| 5a | 5a | "Chuck!" | Traditional, Confusing | Matt Fleckenstein | Chuck the Evil Sandwich Making Guy | Dazzling | October 5, 2007 | 105A |
When Chuck the Evil Sandwich-Making Guy is trying to steal gold instead of sandwiches. Which is confusing to everyone else, WordGirl must decide which is a bigger threat to the city: Chuck's crimes, or Tim's strange-smelling traditional family recipe.
| 5b | 5b | "Down with Word Up" | Deceive, Idolize | Danielle Koenig | Granny May | Dazzling (bonus round) | October 5, 2007 | 105B |
Granny May tricks the townspeople into turning against WordGirl–providing a cover for her latest crime spree. WordGirl must save the town and turn the public opinion back to her side.
| 6a | 6a | "Book Ends" | Destroy, Predictable | Peggy Nicoll | Theodore "Tobey" McCallister III | Soar | October 19, 2007 | 106A |
When WordGirl accuses Tobey of being too predictable with his crimes, he responds by using his robots to hold the town's newest library hostage. The only way she can save is if she faces off against Tobey in a game of winner-take-all dodge ball.
| 6b | 6b | "Mr. Big" | Vague, Specific | Jack Ferraiolo | Mr. Big | Soar (bonus round) | October 19, 2007 | 106B |
Shelly Smalls (a.k.a. Mr. Big), a slick purple-masked business man up to no good, his sidekick and reporter woman Leslie, decides to introduce a new product–"The Thing", which is a product that does "stuff". WordGirl must figure out his secret motive and save the city.
| 7a | 7a | "Super-Grounded" | Disappointed, Preposterous | Joe Garden and Anita Serwacki | The Butcher | Swerve | November 23, 2007 | 107A |
Becky is grounded for not cleaning her room–when she sends Captain Huggy Face in WordGirl's place to battle the Butcher, he feels like WordGirl doesn't think he's a powerful and dangerous villain.
| 7b | 7b | "Mouse Army" | Depend, Stampede | Chris Karwowski | Dr. Two-Brains | Swerve (bonus round) | November 23, 2007 | 107B |
Dr. Two-Brains has created an army of super-smart mice–but they've become so smart that they won't obey their master. WordGirl and Two-Brains must team up to save the city before the mice take over.
| 8a | 8a | "Tobey's Masterpiece" | Masterpiece, Gasp | Matt Fleckenstein | Theodore "Tobey" McCallister III | Smash | December 7, 2007 | 108A |
After Tobey fails to paint a masterpiece in art class, he orders one of his robots to destroy Fair City. Tobey's robot turns out to be a great artist in its own right.
| 8b | 8b | "Chuck the Nice Pencil-Selling Guy" | Stubborn, Compromise | Danielle Koenig | Chuck the Evil Sandwich Making Guy | Smash (bonus round) | December 7, 2007 | 108B |
Chuck, freed from jail, tries to go straight by working in an office–but when he finds out his new boss doesn't like sandwiches, he snaps and takes him captively. WordGirl must broker a compromise to save the day. Special guest star: Peter Graves as Mr. Callaghan Note: This is Peter Graves' final television role before his death in 2010.
| 9a | 9a | "The Birthday Girl" | Generous, Exaggerate | Peggy Nicoll | Eileen the Birthday Girl | Scowl | December 21, 2007 | 109A |
One day at a park, Becky and Violet are enjoying flying kites, when they meet Eileen (a.k.a. The Birthday Girl), a 10-year-old spoiled brat who enlarges herself into green when she doesn't get her way by saying "mine". When Captain Huggy Face is kidnapped by Eileen and she goes to Eileen's house, both are having a tea party together and Bob refuses to change clothes on. While WordGirl is only hoping to team up with Violet's help to save Bob and Eileen. Special guest star: Pamela Adlon: Eileen aka The Birthday Girl
| 9b | 9b | "Granny-Sitter" | Investigate, Accelerate | Peggy Nicoll | Granny May | Scowl (bonus round) | December 21, 2007 | 109B |
Granny May answers an ad to be Botsford's new babysitter–so she can have an alibi for her latest crime–to steal a golden race car. But she didn't plan advice on babysitting WordGirl.
| 10a | 10a | "Mr. Big's Big Plan" | Decide, Opponent | Peggy Nicoll | Mr. Big | Enormous | February 15, 2008 | 110A |
Mr. Big and Leslie are back, and this time, Mr. Big is running for mayor. Mr. Big says he's reformed, and makes false promises to the townspeople in order to steal the election. WordGirl must find out his evil plan and save the city before Mr. Big wins the election and takes over.
| 10b | 10b | "Vocab Bee" | Perfect, Suspicious | Matt Fleckenstein | The Butcher | Enormous (bonus round) | February 15, 2008 | 110B |
Becky Botsford (a.k.a. WordGirl) enters a vocabulary bee, but finds herself only to be distracted by The Butcher's imperfect plot to rob the bank. Meanwhile, as she continues to sneak away from the Vocab Bee to see what the Butcher is up to, Todd "Scoops" Ming, the school reporter, is growing suspicious of her. Special guest star: Kevin McDonald as the judge
| 11a | 11a | "Shrinkin' in the Ray" | Increase, Decrease | Ben Zelevansky | Dr. Two-Brains | Dazed | February 18, 2008 | 111A |
Dr. Two-Brains invents a Shrinkinator in order to shrink large amounts of cheese, making it easier for him to steal. After he accidentally shrinks Scoops and Bill the grocery store manager, WordGirl must put a stop to his cheese shrinking crimes with the Shrinkinator–which is hard to do, as she gets shrunk as well. However, shrinking objects is easy, but restoring them to their original size is much, much more difficult.
| 11b | 11b | "Department Store Tobey" | Malfunction, Clever | Regan G. Toews | Theodore "Tobey" McCallister III | Dazed (bonus round) | February 18, 2008 | 111B |
Interrupting the Botsford's shoe shopping trip, Tobey tries as usual–to impress WordGirl with his giant robots. However, many of the robots appear to be malfunctioning.
| 12a | 12a | "Chuck E. Sneeze" | Avoid, Contagious | Peggy Nicoll | Chuck the Evil Sandwich Making Guy | Hurl | April 11, 2008 | 112A |
Poor WordGirl has caught a contagious cold, but she must put a stop to Chuck's latest evil scheme before resting up. Chuck tries to avoid getting sick, but ends up catching WordGirl's cold as well when she accidentally sneezes on him. Note: The title of the episode is a reference to Chuck E. Cheese's.
| 12b | 12b | "Swap Meat" | Forgery, Magnificent | Ben Zelevansky | The Butcher | Hurl (bonus round) | April 11, 2008 | 112B |
Becky and her friend Violet Heaslip visit an art gallery, only to find the notorious Butcher auctioning off rare and magnificent works of art, previously thought to have been lost for many years. WordGirl and Captain Huggy must figure out how the Butcher is pulling off his scheme to auction off forgeries of these famous lost works of magnificent art. Special guest star: A.D. Miles as the Auctioneer & Police Commissioner Watson
| 13a | 13a | "Granny's Goodtime All Cure Spritzer" | Hoax, Potent | Ethan Banville | Granny May | Pounce | April 18, 2008 | 113A |
Granny May sells phony bottles of youth-restoring spritzer, claiming that just one spray will give anyone the strength to escape her cocoons of yarn. WordGirl and Captain Huggy prove this is a hoax.
| 13b | 13b | "Mecha-Mouse" | Identical, Astonished | Dan Milledge | Dr. Two-Brains | Pounce (bonus round) | April 18, 2008 | 113B |
Dr. Two-Brains builds a mechanical mouse muscle suit, which he plans to use for robbing the annual 2-for-1 festival. Now that Two-Brains has become much stronger, WordGirl and Captain Huggy must find a way to defeat his Mecha-Mouse.
| 14a | 14a | "Princess Triana and the Ogre of Castlebum" | Reveal, Devotion | Ethan Banville | Theodore "Tobey" McCallister III | Stroll | April 25, 2008 | 114A |
Tobey and Becky are both devoted fans of the Princess Triana book series. But when Tobey arrives late to the midnight release of the newest book, "Princess Triana and the Ogre of Castlebum", he finds that the line is far too long. Unwilling to wait in the back of the line, Tobey plots to steal a copy of the book before it gets released. Using his robots, he attacks the armored van containing the books, snatches a copy, and spitefully tries to reveal the ending to WordGirl before she gets a chance to read it.
| 14b | 14b | "Heat Wave, Crime Wave" | Swelter, Opportunity | Regan G. Toews | Granny May | Stroll (bonus round) | April 25, 2008 | 114B |
On a sweltering summer day, Granny May uses the heat wave as an opportunity to go on a crime spree using her air-conditioned jetpack/suit of armor. The sweltering heat wave just may be too intense for WordGirl–and if she doesn't stop Granny May in time, the other Botsfords will leave for the water park without her. Note: The episode was formerly titled Summertime!.
| 15a | 15a | "Thorn in the Sidekick" | Sidekick, Exasperate | Chris Karwowski | Chuck the Evil Sandwich Making Guy and the Whammer | Devour | May 26, 2008 | 115A |
Chuck the Evil Sandwich-Making Guy gains a sidekick named The Whammer, a supervillain who creates sonic waves by smashing his fists together and uses the word "wham" at the most inopportune moments. However, The Whammer is obnoxious and exasperating, and acts more like a boss to Chuck, rather than a sidekick. WordGirl must save the town (and Chuck) from being whammed by The Whammer.
| 15b | 15b | "Crime Takes a Holiday" | Replacement, Gloat | Ryan Raddatz | Glen Furlblam | Devour (bonus round) | May 26, 2008 | 115B |
A super-fan named Glen Furlblam seems to be the replacement for Dr. Two-Brains while he goes on vacation. But Glen's incompetence as a villain and constant gloating makes it easy for WordGirl to track him down and put a stop to the foolish antics he calls crimes. Special guest star: Brian Posehn as Glen Furlblam
| 16a | 16a | "Meat with a Side of Cute" | Frantic, Adorable | Joe Garden and Anita Serwacki | The Butcher | Dazzling | May 27, 2008 | 116A |
The Butcher enlists an adorable kitten named Li'l Mittens as his ally, hoping to conquer WordGirl with cuteness. WordGirl and Captain Huggy are distracted by the kitten every time they attempt to stop the Butcher's crimes. But when the kitten runs off, the Butcher is frantically trying to find him. Special guest star: Stephanie Sheh as Li'l Mitten
| 16b | 16b | "Mr. Big Words" | Clarify, Proceed | Peggy Nicoll | Mr. Big | Dazzling (bonus round) | May 27, 2008 | 116B |
Mr. Big creates a new mind-control ray that makes everyone use complicated vocabulary words. Meanwhile, his assistant Leslie skydives into the city to attach his "Word Sucker" microphones to every building to record WordGirl's clarifying definitions. Soon WordGirl is forced to clarify more words than ever. She proceeds to help the confused townspeople clarify until she finds out what Mr. Big is up to.
| 17a | 17a | "Two-Brains Forgets" | Quarrel, Identity | Peggy Nicoll | Dr. Two-Brains | Soar | June 13, 2008 | 117A |
Dr. Two-Brains discovers WordGirl's secret identity. And when he comes over to her house to let her family know, they're in for quite a surprise on finding out that WordGirl and Captain Huggy are members of the family.
| 17b | 17b | "Banned on the Run" | Banned, Restore | Matt Fleckenstein | Mr. Big | Soar (bonus round) | June 13, 2008 | 117B |
Mr. Big finally cheats his way to becoming the town mayor by having him and Leslie disguise themselves, and then have Leslie use his mind-control ray to force the current town mayor into giving him complete control of the city. As a result, WordGirl and Captain Huggy are both banned from the city. As Becky and Bob, the heroes must restore order to the town.
| 18a | 18a | "Have You Seen the Remote?" | President, Baffling | Peggy Nicoll | Theodore "Tobey" McCallister III | Swerve | July 11, 2008 | 118A |
Tobey's mother "accidentally" sells his master remote and it ends up in the hands of Johnson, who presents it to TJ, the president of the International WordGirl Fanclub. When TJ starts arbitrarily pressing buttons, robots begin behaving strangely, wrecking various buildings and areas as they go. WordGirl and Huggy find Tobey, who explains the situation, and since WordGirl doesn't know what the remote looks like, she suggests they work together to find it. WordGirl asks Tobey if he has a tracking device for the remote, which he does, but he hides it in his back pocket saying he has never herd of a "tr-a-cking device." In their search, Tobey slyly suggests that they should search the library and museum. At the library, he finds WordGirl's favorite dictionary and at the museum, he views her favorite painting. They even get ice cream in the park. WordGirl actually seems to enjoy this dream date of Tobey's.
| 18b | 18b | "Sidekicked to the Curb" | Motivate, Finale | Ryan Raddatz | The Whammer and The Coach | Swerve (bonus round) | July 11, 2008 | 118B |
When the Whammer decides he wants to be his own boss, he signs up for the Coach's motivational help program. But he just became a pawn in the Coach's evil plot. WordGirl must face the Whammer once and for all and catch the finale of her favorite TV show.
| 19a | 19a | "Lady Redundant Woman" | Perplexed, Redundant | Matt Fleckenstein | Lady Redundant Woman | Smash | July 23, 2008 | 119A |
An employee woman named Beatrice Bixby hates a nice employee named Dave because she wanted to be named manager of the local copy shop where they work. Then one day, when she finds a hidden button in a photocopier and presses it, she becomes Lady Redundant Woman who can create clones of herself and starts a heist on redundant items. Special guest star: Amanda Plummer as Lady Redundant Woman
| 19b | 19b | "A Game of Cat and Mouse" | Texture, Weakness | Will Shepard | Dr. Two-Brains | Smash (bonus round) | July 23, 2008 | 119B |
This time, nothing can stop Dr. Two-Brains from his weakness, with his hair dyer ray that transforms from hair gel into cream cheese. WordGirl teams up with the newest resident of Two-Brain's old science lab, Professor Tubing, to find Dr. Two-Brains' weakness–cats. Special guest star: Stephen Root as Professor Robert Tubing
| 20a | 20a | "The Masked Meat Marauder" | Rival, Morale | Will Shepard | The Butcher and The Masked Meat Marauder | Scowl | August 15, 2008 | 120A |
While the Botsfords and the Mings compete in charity car washing, the Butcher battles his new rival called The Masked Meat Marauder, a Mexican-like meat villain with a French accent and more powerful powers than the Butcher since his meat attacks include flavor in them. WordGirl must stop the two meat-wielding villains and put an end to their crime spree in time to assist her family in the car washing competition. Special guest star: Elliott Gould as The Masked Meat Marauder
| 20b | 20b | "Sandwich World" | Compliment, Lair | Matt Fleckenstein | Chuck the Evil Sandwich Making Guy | Scowl (bonus round) | August 15, 2008 | 120B |
Tired of using his mother's basement as an evil lair, Chuck decides to construct a secret hideaway of his own. Thus, he builds "Sandwich World", a zany sandwich theme park. WordGirl and Captain Huggy find their way through this theme park, when Chuck is strong enough to avoid getting homesick.
| 21a | 21a | "Violet Superhero" | Catchphrase, Confide | Peggy Nicoll | The Butcher | Enormous | September 12, 2008 | 121A |
One moonlight night, after a strange paint-splattering accident, Violet believes she has become a superhero called "The Framer". She assumes she has the power to capture villains and tie them up simply by holding up her picture frame in front of them, closing her eyes, and reciting her catchphrase. The Framer seems to have replaced WordGirl when battling The Amazing Rope Guy, Granny May, and Dr. Two-Brains. However, her "superpowers" aren't much help for WordGirl, whom she constantly confides in. But The Framer soon comes to assist her when The Butcher attacks.
| 21b | 21b | "Big Business" | Gibberish, Brilliant | Ben Zelevansky | Mr. Big | Enormous (bonus round) | September 12, 2008 | 121B |
When Mr. Big's personal assistant Leslie tells Mr. Big that they own the second biggest building, and that the Welrose building is the biggest building in their city, Mr. Big sabotages Businesspaloozafest in an attempt to gain control over the building. As the Botsfords are looking at Suzy P. Snugglestein's factory of cuteness, Mr. Big puts on a big spectacle, impressing many townspeople with utter gibberish, which they consider to be brilliant. WordGirl goes on the case to stop him from cheating and speaking gibberish, but when Leslie activates another mind-control ray at the final judging of the contest for the best business on WordGirl, The Mayor, and Sally, it is up to Captain Huggy to save them.
| 22a | 22a | "The Handsome Panther" | Ferocious, Design | Ryan Raddatz | Chuck (as the Handsome Panther) | Dazed | October 13, 2008 | 122A |
Tired of the same old sandwich-related crimes, Chuck the Evil Sandwich-Making Guy develops a new persona: The Handsome Panther, who's ferocious, and even has his own theme song, while at Becky's house, Tim is coming up with a design for Bob's new monkey home. WordGirl and Captain Huggy go off to battle the Panther, as he goes to steal a sandwich recipe, and he still continues using the same old sandwich-related weapons, Chuck's new identity throws off WordGirl.
| 22b | 22b | "The Butcher, the Baker, and the Candlestick Maker" | Finicky, Trio | Will Shepard | The Butcher | Dazed (bonus round) | October 13, 2008 | 122B |
The Butcher and his old friends, The Baker, and The Candlestick Maker, try to relive their past of pulling silly pranks. Meanwhile, WordGirl is working on acquiring the perfect birthday cake for a finicky Tim–but when she shows up on the scene, the Butcher resists his evil ways. Special guest star: Kevin McDonald as the Baker
| 23a | 23a | "Mousezilla" | Collaborate, Quest | Peggy Nicoll | Theodore "Tobey" McCallister III and Dr. Two-Brains | Hurl | November 3, 2008 | 123A |
Team Botsford competes against Team Heaslip in the citywide scavenger hunt. Dr. Two-Brains and Tobey have collaborated to create a Mousezilla robot to attack the city and steal all its cheese. WordGirl is able to defeat Mousezilla and help her family in their quest to win the scavenger hunt.
| 23b | 23b | "Villain School" | Novice, Legendary | Matt Fleckenstein | The Coach, The Whammer, Novice villains (Timmy Tim-Bo, Big Left Hand Guy, and Ms. Question) | Hurl (bonus round) | November 3, 2008 | 123B |
The Coach invites The Whammer to speak at his new school for Evil Villains and Arch Enemies in an attempt to inspire villains. WordGirl battles this new pack of troublemakers to thwart their first assignment: stealing the legendary "Michelangelo's Whistle", while Captain Huggy is still a novice at a battle plan. Special guest stars: Ned Bellamy as The Coach and Grey DeLisle as Ms. Question.
| 24a | 24a | "Return of the Reprise of Lady Redundant Woman" | Elegant, Incognito | Will Shepard | Lady Redundant Woman | Pounce | November 28, 2008** | 124A |
Lady Redundant Woman has escaped from jail and is on a mission to be crowned the belle of the Triple Dip Ball. WordGirl must stop her and her copies before all of the elegant dresses, fancy necklaces and stylish shoes in the city are stolen. Note: Amanda Plummer does not reprise her role of Lady Redundant Woman. Instead, Grey DeLisle starts voicing her here.
| 24b | 24b | "A Simple Plan" | Hideous, Complicated | Dannah Feinglass | Dr. Two-Brains | Pounce (bonus round) | November 28, 2008** | 124B |
After a slew of failed (and complicated) robberies, Dr. Two-Brains decides to go back to basics and simply steal cheese from the grocery store. But he can't resist when the Mayor hosts "The Most Amazing Cheese Stunt In History". He builds an anti-gravity device called "the anti-gravity evil launchinator" and the "super-gravity evil launchinator" to make the stuff fly.
| 25a | 25a | "Granny Mayor" | Masquerade, Appreciate | Peggy Nicoll | Granny May | Stroll | January 1, 2009** | 125A |
Granny May uses her wily ways to become the Mayor's Senior Aide. WordGirl must help the Mayor see past her "nice old lady" act in order to stop him from signing laws which actually help villains commit more crimes.
| 25b | 25b | "Tobey Goes Good" | Demonstrate, Mumble | Matt Fleckenstein | Theodore "Tobey" McCallister III | Stroll (bonus round) | January 1, 2009** | 125B |
In order to win WordGirl's heart, Tobey enters "The Young Inventors Challenge and Friendly Competition." He nearly has WordGirl convinced that he's given up his evil ways, until he loses the competition and his cool. In a fit of fury, he tries to destroy the stage, and WordGirl. Special guest star: Chris Williams as the Judge
| 26a | 26a | "Bongo Rock" | Ponder, Mighty | Matt Fleckenstein | Chuck the Evil Sandwich Making Guy and Mr. Big | Devour | January 2, 2009** | 126A |
Chuck disables the security cameras and ties up the guards at City Hall in what he thinks is the ultimate show of villainous power. But little does he know that Mr. Big is behind his latest crimes. WordGirl and Captain Huggy must prove that they are mightier than these two villains combined.
| 26b | 26b | "Dr. Three-Brains" | Outdo, Unexpected | Will Shepard | Glen Furlblam (as Dr. Three-Brains) | Devour (bonus round) | January 2, 2009** | 126B |
Glen Furlblam has escaped from jail. This time, he's posing as Dr. Three-Brains by having two brains strapped to his head. Dr. Three-Brains steals Dr. Two-Brains' turn-out-light-inator and he's on a mission to outdo his evil idol. So for the first time WordGirl works with Dr. Two-Brains to anticipate Glen's next cheesy scheme. Special guest star: Brian Posehn as Glen Furlblam
