= WordGirl season 6 =

WordGirl
- Season 6
- No. of episodes: 11 (21 segments)

Release
- Original network: PBS Kids Go! (2013); PBS Kids (2014)
- Original release: August 5, 2013 – June 6, 2014

Season chronology
- ← Previous; Season 5 Next → Season 7

The sixth season of the animated series WordGirl was originally broadcast between PBS Kids Go! and PBS Kids in the United States between August 5, 2013 and June 6, 2014. The sixth season contained 11 episodes (21 segments).

== Cast ==
Cast	Characters
Dannah Phirman	Becky Botsford/WordGirl, Claire McCallister, Chuck's Mom, Edith Von Housenhous, Pretty Princess
Chris Parnell	Narrator, Henchmen #1, Museum Security Guard, Exposition Guy
James Adomian	Bob/Captain Huggy Face, Chip Von Dumor, Harry Kempel, Hal Hardbargain
Jack D. Ferraiolo	The Butcher
Fred Stoller	Chuck the Evil Sandwich Making Guy
Cree Summer	Granny May
Patton Oswalt	Theodore "Tobey" McCallister the Third, Robots
Tom Kenny	Dr. Two-Brains, TJ Botsford, Warden Chalmers, Brent the Handsome Successful Everyone Loves Him Sandwich Making Guy
Jeffrey Tambor	Mr. Big
John C. McGinley	The Whammer
Maria Bamford	Violet Heaslip, Sally Botsford, Leslie, Johnson, Loretta-Sanchez Johnson
Grey DeLisle	Lady Redundant Woman, Ms. Question
Pamela Adlon	Eileen aka The Birthday Girl
Ryan Raddatz	Todd "Scoops" Ming, Tim Botsford
Larry Murphy	The Amazing Rope Guy, African-American Cop, Anthony the News Reporter
Ned Bellamy	The Coach
Jen Cohn	Female Bank Teller
Ron Lynch	The Mayor
H. Jon Benjamin	Reginald the Jewelry Store Clerk, Invisi-Bill
Mike O'Connell	Grocery Store Manager, Big Left Hand Guy
Daran Norris	Seymour Orlando Smooth, Nocan the Contrarian

=== May I Have a Word cast ===
May I Have a Word cast	Characters
J. D. Cerna	Beau Handsome
Tom Kenny	Phil
Orlando Brown	Tommy
Kelly Miyahara	Emily
James Adomian	Captain Huggy Face

== Episodes ==
No. overall	No. in season	Title	Vocab words	Written by	Villains	May I Have a Word?	Original release date	Prod. code
94a	1a	"Who Wants to Get Rid of WordGirl"	Strategy, Giddy	Scott Ganz and Andrew Samson	Seymour Orlando Smooth with Dr. Two-Brains, Chuck the Evil Sandwich Making Guy, and Nocan the Contrarian	Recline	August 5, 2013	603A
Dr. Two-Brains, Chuck the Evil Sandwich Making Guy, and Nocan the Contrarian have been brought by Seymour Orlando Smooth together in an attempt to ultimately defeat WordGirl.
94b	1b	"The Talented Mr. Birg"	Employee, Doppelganger	Jack Ferraiolo	Mr. Big	Recline (bonus round)	August 5, 2013	603B
When Scoops writes an article about all the times, WordGirl has been tricked and captured by villains, she goes off to prove him wrong. When someone who looks just like Mr. Big claims to be a Mr. Birg, WordGirl is convinced he's lying, and refuses to be tricked again. Mr. Birg proves to be telling the truth, WordGirl looks foolish in front of her fans again.
95a	2a	"One Last Sandwich"	Final, Pacify	Eric Ledgin	Chuck the Evil Sandwich Making Guy and The Whammer	Apprehend	August 5, 2013	604A
While Becky and her mother set out to build a new bookcase that will hold all of Becky's books, The Whammer convinces Chuck to commit one last crime with him before he retires. They are able to work as a team and pull off the ultimate sandwich heist.
95b	2b	"Caper or Plastic?"	Muffled, Flashback	Charles M. Howell and Gordon Bressack	Hal Hardbargain and The Masked Bagger (flashback only)	Apprehend (bonus round)	August 6, 2013	604B
While Becky is busy thinking about when she grows up, Hal Hardbargain is busy trying to get WordGirl to help him get his bag blaster back from the infamous and mysterious: Masked Bagger. WordGirl figures out the Masked Bagger's true identity.
96a	3a	"Tell Her What She's Won!"	Bombard, Emcee	Charles M. Howell and Gordon Bressack	Seymour Orlando Smooth	Fumble	August 7, 2013	605A
Seymour Orlando Smooth is jealous because he kidnapped Beau Handsome, the host of everyone's favorite game show, "May I Have a Word?". When he starts stealing money from innocent contestants, WordGirl makes an appearance, and she comes up with a game plan to put Seymour back where he belongs: behind bars.
96b	3b	"Victoria is the Best...WordGirl?"	Fib, Mistaken	Ryan Raddatz	Victoria Best	Fumble (bonus round)	August 7, 2013	605B
When Scoops snaps a picture of Victoria Best suspiciously appearing after WordGirl before she has disappeared. He believes that the real WordGirl is: Victoria called his nickname "WordGirl", the best superhero in the city. WordGirl proves that Victoria is actually fibbing without giving away her real secret identity.
97a	4a	"High-Five Sandwich"	Trendy, Eager	Ryan Raddatz	Chuck the Evil Sandwich Making Guy	Clutch	August 8, 2013	606A
Chuck's reputation is threatened by a new sandwich created by Becky, Scoops, and Violet.
97b	4b	"The Robot Problem"	Fuel, Cackle	Charles M. Howell and Gordon Bressack	Theodore "Tobey" MacCallister III and The Coach	Clutch (bonus round)	August 8, 2013	606B
WordGirl ends up in a truce with Tobey when his robot remote is stolen by The Coach.
98a	5a	"Of Two Minds"	Waver, Vast	Grant Moran	Dr. Two-Brains	Console	August 9, 2013	607A
Dr. Two-Brains is given up by stealing cheese and he sees a giant cheese asteroid.
98b	5b	"Yes Monkey"	Trance, Resign	Kevin Hopps	Mr. Big	Console (bonus round)	August 9, 2013	607B
Huggy gets a job and Mr. Big uses mind-control plans, now he gets kidnapped with others. WordGirl comes by and teams up with Leslie and gets her old one back.
99	6	"Invasion of the Bunny Lovers"	Delightful, Innovative Confidential, Global	Grant Moran Jack Ferraiolo	Mr. Big and Dr. Two-Brains	Perspire	April 14, 2014	613
Mr. Big and Dr. Two-Brains team up to create a plan to control the minds of everyone in the city. Their plan seems to be working and turning everyone into zombies. Scoops is on the scene to get the story, but he gets the surprise of his life when he sees Becky turn into WordGirl to save the city from Dr. Two Brains and Mr. Big's evil plan. Mr. Big and Dr. Two-Brains have managed to turn the entire city into mind-controlled zombies–everyone except for Scoops and Becky. Now that Scoops knows Becky's big secret, he will write the biggest story of his career, and he will help his friend outsmart the villains before they put their mind control scheme in action.
100a	7a	"Big and Brent"	Dubious, Conspire	Ryan Young and Steve Young	Mr. Big	Flicker	June 2, 2014	608A
Chuck feels furious, when he finds out his brother Brent is spending time with Mr. Big. He can't understand why his brother wants to hang out with this criminal and by his own free will–Mr. Big is not using mind control. After pursuing them around town, Chuck finally realizes he needs to talk to Brent about his feelings. Mr. Big got Brent right where he wants him.
100b	7b	"Silence of the Whams"	Fragile, Burst	Charles M. Howell and Gordon Bressack	The Whammer	Flicker (bonus round)	June 2, 2014	608B
After losing his "wham" and deciding to give up crime, WordGirl and Captain Huggy Face try to help The Whammer come up with a new career. The Whammer finds happiness being a jammer, clammer, and a crammer, he figures out why he lost his "wham" in the first place and gets back into a life of whamming.
101a	8a	"Dr. Two-Brains, Mr. Cheese"	Command, Location/Locate	Ryan Raddatz	Dr. Two-Brains and Mr. Cheese	Cower	June 3, 2014	609A
Fed up with his henchmen, Dr. Two-Brains begins the search for a new sidekick. He's thrilled to find an evil mouse named Mr. Cheese, who seems to be perfect for the job, but soon regrets the decision as Mr. Cheese takes control and makes Dr. Two Brains his sidekick. Dr. Two-Brains agree to take orders from a tiny, evil mouse–therefore, WordGirl and Captain Huggy Face stop the evil pair before it's too late.
101b	8b	"Kitty Cat Criminals"	Ornamental, Feline	Jack Ferraiolo	Chuck the Evil Sandwich Making Guy and The Butcher	Cower (bonus round)	June 3, 2014	609B
When The Butcher and Chuck the Evil Sandwich Making Guy join forces, they have a surprisingly hard time coming up with a meat-and-sandwich related crime to commit. Stumped, they discover an opportunity to steal feline artifacts and memorabilia, prompting Chuck to bring back his former alter-ego The Handsome Panther and the Butcher to take on the identity of his former sidekick: Li'l Mittens. WordGirl is too distracted jazzing up her own costume to outsmart the duo and once again save the day.
102a	9a	"A Questionable Pair"	Flatter, Tactic	Eric Ledgin	Ms. Question and Invisi-Bill	Dangle	June 4, 2014	610A
When Becky sees Ms. Question in the jewelry store having a friendly conversation with Reginald, she wonders what she might be up to. What she can't see is that Ms. Question has joined forces with Invisi-Bill to trick Reginald and rob the store. Meanwhile, Scoops can see that Becky is distracted from the movie they're watching. Becky is able to figure out what the villains are up to and she will stop them as WordGirl and not abandon Scoops as Becky.
102b	9b	"All That Chazz"	Fascinated, Obey	Scott Ganz and Andrew Samson	Dr. Two-Brains	Dangle (bonus round)	June 4, 2014	610B
Chazz, a new kid in town, does what he wants and is the authority on all things "cool". TJ is so impressed with Chazz that he does everything Chazz tells him in order to be as cool as his new friend. When TJ's new friendship gets him involved with Dr. Two-Brains, TJ turns his back on WordGirl in order to prove he's cool enough and he discovers that being true to himself is even cooler. Special Guest Star: Brendon Small as Chazz
103a	10a	"Fortune Crookie"	Predict, Enthrall	Tom Sheppard	Seymour Orlando Smooth	Recline	June 5, 2014	611A
When Seymour Orlando Smooth's latest show is canceled, the desperate host must come up with a plan to get some quick cash. Meanwhile, Becky is suspicious when the townspeople start giving their hard-earned money to a mysterious object that claims to know the future. WordGirl is able to connect Seymour to the scam and help the townspeople get their money back. Note: This episode makes a parody of A Space Odyssey.
103b	10b	"Parsley, Sage, Rosemary and Crime"	Concoction, Elusive	Ryan Raddatz	Dr. Two-Brains	Recline (bonus round)	June 5, 2014	611B
When Becky and Tim Botsford head into the forest to find an important ingredient for their Bold Botsford Stew. They run into trouble, Dr. Two-Brains and his henchmen are also searching for Bold Botsford Basil to complete a stolen recipe. WordGirl steps in to make sure all's fair in the forest.
104a	11a	"Go Gadget Go"	Brainstorm, Gadget	Scott Ganz and Andrew Samson	Theodore "Tobey" MacCallister III	Apprehend	June 6, 2014	612A
TJ and his friend Johnson both think they are WordGirl's #1 fan and they compete to prove it. When WordGirl challenges them to each come up with a new gadget to help her fight crime, Johnson accepts help from Tobey. The device made by Johnson and Tobey helps WordGirl or will it be another one of Tobey's tricks to try to control her.
104b	11b	"Emergency Plan 999"	Courageous, Stunt	Ryan Raddatz	Dr. Two-Brains	Apprehend (bonus round)	June 6, 2014	612B
When Dr. Two-Brains captures Captain Huggy Face and forces WordGirl to remember all 998 of her emergency plans to get him back, WordGirl realizes she needs help. WordGirl calls on her biggest fan, who just happens to be her little brother to help her. When Dr. Two-Brains refuses to play fair, it becomes a Botsford family effort to save the day.
