= Night of the Day of the Dawn of the Son of the Bride of the Return of the Revenge of the Terror of the Attack of the Evil, Mutant, Alien, Flesh Eating, Hellbound, Zombified Living Dead =

Parody film series by James Riffel

- Directed by: Lowell Mason (an alias for James Riffel)
- Written by: James Riffel
- Produced by: James Riffel w/ special accolades provided by Adam Christopher Janowski
- Starring: James Riffel (voice)
- Release date: January 1, 1991
- Running time: 96 minutes
- Country: United States
- Language: English

Night of the Day of the Dawn of the Son of the Bride of the Return of the Revenge of the Terror of the Attack of the Evil, Mutant, Alien, Flesh Eating, Hellbound, Zombified Living Dead is a series of parody films written by James Riffel as spoofs, adding his own scripts on already known films and television footage after deleting the original scripts from the films.

== Part 1 ==
Part 1 remains obscure and as yet unreleased, as it was created at a public access station where Riffel took several student films he had made at New York University, some video footage, super 8 home movies, and other materials, and edited them in a few days. It was never released and is, according to Riffel, "back at [his] parents' house at the bottom of one of the closets".

== Part 2 ==
Titled Night of the Day of the Dawn of the Son of the Bride of the Return of the Revenge of the Terror of the Attack of the Evil, Mutant, Alien, Flesh Eating, Hellbound, Zombified Living Dead Part 2, sometimes with the added title in Shocking 2-D, is a 1991 horror spoof written and directed by James Riffel under the alias Lowell Mason. It is also known as NOTDOT. Although referred to as Part 2, it is the first in the series to be publicly released. The film was created by re-dubbing the 1968 horror classic Night of the Living Dead with comedic dialog, and by adding new clips.

Night of the Day of the Dawn of the Son of the Bride of the Return of the Revenge of the Terror of the Attack of the Evil, Mutant, Alien, Flesh Eating, Hellbound, Zombified Living Dead was screened at the New York City Horror Film Festival in October 2005.

With 41 words in its title, 168 characters without spaces, and 201 characters counting spaces, it holds the distinction of being cited as the movie with the longest English language title, but of the title, Maitland McDonagh of TV Guide wrote, "Most people cite [the film] as the longest English-language title of all time, but it's clearly a gimmicky joke."

== Part 3 ==
A follow-up film was called Night of the Day of the Dawn of the Son of the Bride of the Return of the Revenge of the Terror of the Attack of the Evil, Mutant, Hellbound, Flesh-Eating Subhumanoid Zombified Living Dead, Part 3. It was done on a budget of $92.37 and done in answer to Steven Spielberg's 2005 film War of the Worlds that cost $200 million.

== Part 4 ==
A film also made in 2005 called Night of the Day of the Dawn of the Son of the Bride of the Return of the Revenge of the Terror of the Attack of the Evil, Mutant, Hellbound, Flesh-Eating Subhumanoid Zombified Living Dead, Part 4, which was a re-dubbing of the 1932 film The Most Dangerous Game. It was done for a total sum of $99. Riffel also added some scenes from his own, mostly representing two drunk guys answering questions about various matters and parachuting into the Everglades. It was released online and aired a few times on the internet, but no DVD was released of "Part 4". The film was made as a challenge to Peter Jackson who was remaking a classic King Kong into a lengthier modern version in 2005.

== Part 5 ==
Titled Night Of The Day Of The Dawn Of The Son Of The Bride Of The Return Of The Revenge Of The Terror Of The Attack Of The Evil, Mutant, Hellbound, Flesh-Eating, Crawling, Alien, Zombified, Subhumanoid Living Dead — Part 5 is a spoof written by James Riffel and released in 2011.

The movie is only fifty minutes long and is a parody of the golden age of television comparing what was considered appropriate television in the 1950s and 1960s and what is considered appropriate TV today. Riffel took an episode of The Andy Griffith Show and Bonanza replacing the dialogue with what Riffel believes are words and music that are more along the lines of what today's TV viewers are used to.

This was the first movie that Riffel wrote to be used for charity. Despite being Part 5, it is actually the fourth movie in the series to be released to the public. The title contains 41 words and contains 177 characters without spaces, making it one of the longest movie titles ever made.
