= J. D. Cerna =

American actor

John Dayton Cerna, often credited as J. D. Cerna, is an American actor and writer. He appeared in the 1988-89 horror film The Dead Come Home. In the 1995 coming-of-age short film Alkali, Iowa, which is part of Boys Life 2, the 1997 compilation of short films about young gay men, Cerna portrayed Jack Gudmanson, a leading character who is coming to terms of his sexuality and learns about his father's secret past. Cerna was a columnist for the LGBT-related newspaper Washington Blade in 2002–05. He wrote and performed a leading role of his semi-autobiographical play Not as Cute as Picture, whose story focuses on a "young gay man's pursuit of purpose, often obstructed by [the crisis] of AIDS," set in 1994. The play was nominated in the 14th Annual GLAAD Media Awards (2003) for Outstanding Theatre: Washington D. C. He wrote another play Problem Cat: A Love Story. Cerna is openly gay.
