= WordGirl =

American animated superhero children's television series

- Also known as: The Amazing Colossal Adventures of WordGirl
- Genre: Comedy; Edutainment; Superhero; Satire
- Created by: Dorothea Gillim
- Developed by: Dorothea Gillim; Jack D. Ferraiolo
- Directed by: Steve Young
- Creative director: David SanAngelo
- Voices of: Dannah Feinglass-Phirman; Tom Kenny; Maria Bamford; Cree Summer; Patton Oswalt; Fred Stoller; H. Jon Benjamin; Larry Murphy; James Adomian; Grey DeLisle; Jeffrey Tambor; John C. McGinley
- Narrated by: Chris Parnell; Rodger Parsons (interstitials)
- Theme music composer: Steve D'Angelo; Terry Tompkins
- Opening theme: "Word Up, It's WordGirl!" by Sharon Lee Williams
- Ending theme: "Word Up, It's WordGirl!" (instrumental)
- Composers: Steve D'Angelo & Terry Tompkins
- Country of origin: United States
- Original language: English
- No. of seasons: 8
- No. of episodes: 130 (250 segments) (list of episodes)

Production
- Executive producers: Dorothea Gillim (seasons 1–2); Deborah Forte (seasons 2–8)
- Producers: Will Shepard (season 1); Danielle Gillis (seasons 2–8)
- Running time: 26–27 minutes
- Production companies: Soup2Nuts; Scholastic Entertainment

Original release
- Network: PBS Kids (Note: Aired as part of PBS Kids Go! until October 6, 2013.)
- Release: November 10, 2006 – October 10, 2007 (shorts)
- Release: September 3, 2007 – August 7, 2015 (series)

WordGirl is an American animated superhero children's television series produced by the Soup2Nuts animation unit of Scholastic Entertainment for PBS Kids. The series began as a series of shorts entitled The Amazing Colossal Adventures of WordGirl that premiered on PBS Kids Go! on November 10, 2006, usually shown at the end of Maya & Miguel; the segment was then spun off into a thirty-minute episodic series that aired from September 3, 2007, to August 7, 2015. The series of shorts consisted of thirty episodes, with 128 episodes and a special in the full half-hour series. WordGirl creator Dorothea Gillim felt that most children's animation "underestimated [children's] sense of humor" and hoped to create a more intellectual show for young audiences.

By June 2014, many PBS stations had stopped airing WordGirl, opting to air more popular series throughout the summer. However, new episodes continued to air on select stations, with streaming options on the PBS Kids website and video app. The series ended with the two-part episode "Rhyme and Reason", which was released on August 7, 2015.

The show was created for children ages 4–9 years old. By 2022, the show had gained a cult following through social media.

== Premise ==
The series follows WordGirl, a 10-year-old girl with superpowers whose secret identity is Becky Botsford, a typical 5th grade student. WordGirl was born on the fictional planet Lexicon (referencing the term that refers to the vocabulary of a person, language, or branch of knowledge), a planet that affords WordGirl her superpowers, including flight and super strength. As an infant, Becky snuck on to a spaceship piloted by her future pet chimpanzee and sidekick, Captain Huggy Face. Huggy Face, who was a pilot in the Lexicon Air Force, was flying the ship but lost control when the child WordGirl awoke and startled him, causing a crash-landing on Earth, more specifically in Fair City. WordGirl uses her superpowers to protect her adoptive home, using her downed spacecraft as a secret base of operations.

WordGirl was soon adopted and provided an alter ego by the couple Tim and Sally Botsford, who gave her the name Becky (the family keeps Captain Huggy Face, a.k.a Bob, as a pet). She has a younger brother, TJ Botsford. TJ, a prototypical sibling rival, is obsessed with WordGirl the superhero, but does not know his sister's true identity and thinks she is lame. Both parents are also unaware. Becky attends Woodview Elementary School as a fifth grader, where she is close friends with Violet Heaslip and the school newspaper reporter Todd "Scoops" Ming.

WordGirl tries to balance her superhero activities with her "normal" life. She battles against an assortment of villains that include The Butcher, Chuck the Evil Sandwich Making Guy, Dr. Two-Brains, Granny May, Lady Redundant Woman, Mr. Big, Theodore "Tobey" McCalister III, Amazing Rope Guy and The Whammer. The villains are all prone to malapropisms. Even though the overwhelming majority of the characters are impossibly oblivious, WordGirl still must worry about maintaining her double life as Becky, and tries her best to keep people from discovering the truth.

== Series overview ==
Season	Segments	Episodes	Originally released		
Season	Segments	Episodes	First released	Last released	Network
Shorts
Shorts	30	30	November 10, 2006	October 10, 2007	PBS Kids Go!
Episodes
1	52	26	September 3, 2007	January 2, 2009	PBS Kids Go!
2	50	26	November 4, 2008	July 20, 2010	PBS Kids Go!
3	25	13	September 7, 2010	July 8, 2011	PBS Kids Go!
4	27	15	September 6, 2011	June 11, 2012	PBS Kids Go!
5	25	13	September 10, 2012	June 14, 2013	PBS Kids Go!
6	21	11	August 5, 2013	June 6, 2014	PBS Kids Go! PBS Kids
7	25	13	August 4, 2014	February 20, 2015	PBS Kids
8	25	13	June 10, 2015	August 7, 2015	PBS Kids

== Characters ==
=== Main ===
- WordGirl (voiced by Dannah Phirman) is a 10-year-old superhero from the planet Lexicon who uses the alias of Becky Botsford when adopted by the Botsford family. She possesses super-strength, super-speed, super-hearing, flight, and the knowledge of different word meanings. She is aware of the 4th wall and often breaks it. While WordGirl works to keep her true identity secret, the ones who do keep it secret upon finding or figuring out are Violet's cat Priscilla, Bampy Botsford, Todd "Scoops" Ming, Kid Math, Rose Franklin, and Violet Heaslip. Captain Huggy Face and the Narrator also know.
- Captain Huggy Face (vocal effects provided by James Adomian) is a monkey from the planet Lexicon who is WordGirl's animal sidekick. He has been called a lot of other animals, which appears to be an occasional running gag throughout the show. Captain Huggy Face masquerades as a normal monkey named Bob when not fighting crime. He is a mentor and best friend to Wordgirl.
- The Narrator (voiced by Chris Parnell) is an unseen character who narrates each episode and also tends to interact with the characters and notices the running gags.
- Tim Botsford (voiced by Ryan Raddatz) is the indecisive adoptive father of Becky Botsford and the patriarch of his family.
- Sally Botsford (voiced by Maria Bamford) is the optimistic adoptive mother of Becky Botsford and the matriarch of the family who works as a district attorney.
- TJ Botsford (voiced by Tom Kenny) is the adoptive brother of Becky Botsford who is a big fan of WordGirl.

=== Supporting ===
- Todd "Scoops" Ming (voiced by Ryan Raddatz) is an Asian reporter for Woodview Elementary School's newspaper called the Daily Rag. He is a good friend, but somewhat self-centered. He learns of WordGirl's true identity in "Invasion of the Bunny Lovers". Becky has a crush on him.
- Violet Heaslip (voiced by Maria Bamford) is the purple-clad blonde best friend of Becky Botsford. She is soft-spoken and artsy, in direct contrast to Becky. She finds out Wordgirl's secret identity in the show's last episode, "Rhyme and Reason".
- The Exposition Guy (voiced by Chris Parnell) is an unnamed man who often calls for help, yelling that a villain is committing a certain crime, and then asks, "is this the police station?", which it never is.
- Reginald (voiced by H. Jon Benjamin) is the pompous owner of Ye Old Fancy Schmancy Jewelry Store.
- Bill (voiced by Mike O'Connell) is the manager of the grocery store in Fair City. The episode "Caper of Plastic" reveals that he used to operate as a supervillain called the Masked Bagger.

=== Villains ===
- The Butcher (voiced by Jack D. Ferraiolo) is a butcher-themed villain who utilizes meat-based attacks. In the episode "The Meaty Dimension", it is revealed he conjures his meat from a parallel universe made entirely of meat. He often misuses or mispronounces words by accident.
  - Kid Potato (voiced by Ed Asner) is an elderly supervillain and the father of Butcher who utilizes potato-based attacks.
- Dr. Two-Brains (voiced by Tom Kenny) is a mouse-themed mad scientist who is obsessed with cheese. Steven Boxleitner started out as a benevolent but distracted scientist until an accident fused his brain with that of an evil mouse named Squeaky. His crimes center around acquiring cheese while simultaneously doing something evil.
  - Charlie and Meatloaf are a duo of bumbling henchmen who serve Dr. Two-Brains. They consist of a large shaved-head man named Charlie and an unnamed man (though one episode gave him the nickname "Meatloaf"; voiced by Chris Parnell) who speaks for Charlie while acting as Charlie's best friend.
- Mr. Big (voiced by Jeffrey Tambor) is the CEO of Mr. Big Industries who wears a purple mask. Born Shelly Smalls, most of his plots involved the use of mind-control devices to get what he wants.
  - Leslie (voiced by Maria Bamford) is Mr. Big's personal assistant.
  - Tiny Big (voiced by James C. Mathis III) is Mr. Big Industries' custom-made pop music star. Fair City became a big fan of his music. When WordGirl reveals that Tiny Big is not an actual singer, Tiny Big flees with Mr. Big.
  - Mr. Big's Bodyguards are two unnamed bald-headed men in sunglasses that are often seen with Mr. Big.
- Granny May (voiced by Cree Summer) is an elderly supervillain who pretends to be innocent to commit heists. She wears retractable armor when committing crimes and fighting Word Girl.
- Chuck the Evil Sandwich Making Guy (voiced by Fred Stoller) is a sandwich-headed supervillain who lives in his mother's basement. He does not have a way with words and uses different condiments as his weapons.
- Theodore "Tobey" McCallister III (voiced by Patton Oswalt) is a 10-year-old boy at Woodview Elementary School who is often shown using his giant robots to cause much trouble in Fair City to win the affection of WordGirl, who he has a massive crush on.
- Eileen the Birthday Girl (voiced by Pamela Adlon) is a spoiled, redheaded 10-year-old girl who thinks that every day is her birthday. When she gets angry/greedy, she grows to a giant size and her skin turns green. Only by getting Eileen what she wants causes Eileen to return to her normal size.
- Amazing Rope Guy (voiced by Larry Murphy) is a rope-themed villain who is incredibly weak.
- Lady Redundant Woman (voiced by Amanda Plummer in her self-titled episode, Grey DeLisle in later appearances) – Beatrice Bixby is a former copy shop employee who was inadvertently merged with a copy machine, gaining the ability to clone herself and other items. True to her name, she has a redundant manner of speech, saying words that mean the same thing.
- Masked Meat Marauder (voiced by Elliott Gould) is a villain with the same abilities as Butcher, but his meat attacks are done with flavor. Though he was the main villain in his self-titled episode where he developed a rivalry with Butcher, Masked Meat Marauder has since made some background appearances since then.
- Maria the Energy Monster (speaking voice provided by Maria Bamford in "Dinner or Consequences") is an electrical monster that was created when a ball of electricity was exposed to an experiment gone wrong.
- The Whammer (voiced by John C. McGinley) is a supervillain who sends out sonic waves upon "whamming". While operating on his own, he has worked as henchmen to other villains.
- The Coach (voiced by Ned Bellamy) is a motivational coach who turned to crime the day he met Whammer and tricked him into committing crimes for him. The Villain Society uses him to keep an eye on any villain that fails to prove themselves and to demote them to the mischief maker level of the Villain Society tier should they fail.
  - Big Left Hand Guy (voiced by Mike O'Connell) is a student of Coach who has an enlarged left hand.
  - Invisi-Bill (voiced by H. Jon Benjamin) is a student of Coach who can turn invisible.
  - Timmy Tim-Bo (voiced by James Adomian) is a student of Coach whose self-described powers is that he naps a lot.
  - Ms. Question (voiced by Grey DeLisle) is a student of Coach who mostly asks questions. She later gained the ability to shoot question marks and give people amnesia.
- Hal Hardbargain (voiced by James Adomian) is a gadget supplier with an electrical eye patch and a mechanical arm who is the proprietor of Hal's Villain Supply Shop, selling equipment to other villains.
- Seymour Orlando Smooth (voiced by Daran Norris) is a tan-skinned game show host and con artist who uses his game shows as covers to steal people's money.
  - Harry Kemple and Chip Von Dumor (both voiced by James Adomian) are Seymour's brothers who help him out in some of his plots.
- Raul Demiglass (voiced by James Adomian) is a TV chef. In "Plain Old Mischief Makers", Demiglass is shown on the mischief maker part of the Villain Society tier and has befriended Glen Flurbaum.
- Glen Flurbaum (voiced by Brian Posehn) is the number-one fan of Dr. Two-Brains who temporarily worked as his henchman when Dr. Two-Brains' henchmen were on vacation.
- Nocan the Contrarian (voiced by Daran Norris) is a barbarian from Contraria who always does the opposite of what he is told to do.
- Victoria Best (voiced by Kristen Schaal) is a child prodigy and student at Woodview Elementary School who is always trying to be the very best at everything, even when pressured by her parents.
  - General Smoochington is a western lowland gorilla who is Victoria Best's pet and sidekick.
- Captain Tangent (voiced by John Henson in his self-titled episode, Brian Stack in "The Penny, the Pony, and the Pirate") is a teenage pirate and former waiter at the pirate-themed restaurant Blackbeard's Buffet who was fired by his manager for telling tangents. He found a hook with magnetic properties that he used to become a supervillain.
  - Oscar is a scarlet macaw who is Captain Tangent's pet and sidekick.
- The Learnerer (voiced by "Weird Al" Yankovic) is a supervillain in an adaptive super-suit who often adds suffixes to the words he uses.
- Miss Power (voiced by Jane Lynch) is an alien from an unknown planet who, along with her sidekick, Colonel Gigglecheeks, plans to take over Earth. Her evil intentions are initially unknown to WordGirl and the residents of Fair City, but eventually WordGirl realizes Miss Power is evil and teams up with all of the city's villains to stop her. She appears for the first and only time in the 4-part special "The Rise of Miss Power".
- Rhyme and Reason (voiced by Amy Sedaris and Tyler Labine, respectively) are a villainous pair of best friends who commit rhyming crimes together. They debut in the very last episode of the show, the 2-parter "Rhyme and Reason". Rhyme has superpowers (super speed, super strength, and ice breath, to be exact) whereas Reason does not, but on the flip side Reason is the only one able to keep Rhyme calm so they can commit crime together.

=== Other ===
- The Mayor of Fair City (voiced by Ron Lynch) is an unnamed African-American man who is often seen making speeches.
- The Principal (voiced by Larry Murphy in "A Few Words from WordGirl") is the unnamed principal of Woodview Elementary School. While the principal first seen was a female, the principal from "A Few Words from WordGirl" was a male.
- Jade Davis (voiced by Amy Sedaris) is a teacher at Woodview Elementary School.
- Mrs. Ripley (voiced by Grey DeLisle) is an African-American woman who is the hyperactive gym teacher at Woodview Elementary School.
- Claire McCallister (voiced by Dannah Phirman) is the mother of Tobey McCallister III who works at the same district attorney's office as Sally Botsford. She is often annoyed that Tobey uses his robots to fulfill his purposes and tends to punish him when WordGirl thwarts him.
- Edith von Housenhous (voiced by Dannah Phirman) is a very rich lady who would have items that would be targeted by supervillains.
- Warden Chalmers (voiced by Tom Kenny) is the prison warden of the Fair City Prison who wears a cowboy hat.
- Brent the Everybody-Loves-Him Sandwich Making Guy (voiced by Tom Kenny) is Chuck's more popular and successful brother with a similar sandwich motive.
- Police Commissioner Watson (voiced by A. D. Miles in "Swap Meat", Wayne Knight in "The Wrong Side of the Law") is the police commissioner of the Fair City Police Department who is known for jumping to conclusions when examining crime scenes.
- Guy Rich (voiced by William Mapother) is a flashy, rich owner of a mini-golf course envied by Mr. Big, but who turns out to be a poor conman inspired by his own envy of other villains.
- Kid Math (voiced by Jack McBrayer) is a math-themed superhero from the planet Hexagon. His normal citizen name is Rex. When he first comes to Earth he doesn't understand the concept of having a secret identity or protecting the people, and WordGirl must mentor him.
- Beau Handsome (voiced by J. D. Cerna, Tom Kenny in "Tell Her What She's Won") is the host of "May I Have a Word", the game show that plays at the end of every individual WordGirl episode. He is somewhat full of himself and thinks he is the most handsome game show host.
- Chuck the Evil Sandwich-Making Guy's Mother (voiced by Dannah Phirman) is never seen on-screen. She favors Chuck's more successful brother Brent.
- Rose Franklin (voiced by Ellie Kemper) is a new student and an investigative reporter who moved to Fair City from Freeport City. In her debut episode "News Girl", she soon figures out WordGirl's secret identity and plans to publish the story, but Scoops convinces her not to.
- Chazz (voiced by Brendon Small) is the "cool" new kid who arrives in town in the episode "All That Chazz". TJ is fascinated with Chazz and does everything he says, even getting rid of all his WordGirl merch because Chazz says WordGirl isn't cool, but finally refuses when Chazz teams up with Dr. Two-Brains and tells TJ to spray WordGirl with cheese.
- Bampy Botsford (voiced by Tim Conway) is Becky and TJ's grandfather; he is first featured in the episode "Bampy Battles Bots". He once defeated a giant robot with nothing more than a screwdriver, and when Tobey builds a robot that knows all of WordGirl's moves, Bampy successfully destroys it. He also figured out his granddaughter is WordGirl and reveals it to Becky at the end of the episode.
- Tommy (voiced by Orlando Brown) is one of the three child contestants on May I Have a Word. It has been implied in a couple of MIHAW segments that he has a big crush on WordGirl, similar to Tobey.

== Voice cast ==
Cast
Dannah Phirman	Becky Botsford / WordGirl, Claire McCallister, Chuck the Evil Sandwich Making Guy's Mother, Edith von Housenhous, Pretty Princess, Female Police Officers
Chris Parnell	The Narrator, Meatloaf, Exposition Guy, Sergeant Henderson, Museum Guard, Mazo-Racer Driver
Tom Kenny	Steven Boxleitner / Dr. Two-Brains, TJ Botsford, Warden Chalmers, Brent the Handsome Successful Everyone-Love-Him Sandwich Making Guy, Steve McClean, Razzmatazzm, Beau Handsome (in "Tell Her What She's Won"), Phil
Cree Summer	Grandolyn May / Granny May
Patton Oswalt	Tobey McCalister III, Robots
Fred Stoller	Chuck the Evil Sandwich Making Guy
Jack D. Ferraiolo	The Butcher, The General
Pamela Adlon	Eileen / The Birthday Girl
Maria Bamford	Violet, Sally Botsford, Leslie, Johnson, Mrs. Best, Energy Monster (in "Dinner or Consequences"), Loretta-Sanchez Johnson
Ryan Raddatz	Tim Botsford, Scoops, Oscar, Handy Man Todd, Scott Wild, Gold Store Clerk (in "Chuck!")
James Adomian	Captain Huggy Face / Bob, Timmy Tim-Bo, Harry Kempel, Chip Von Dumor, Hal Hardbargain, The Candlestick Maker, David Driscoll, Raul Demiglasse, Hunter Throbheart
Grey DeLisle	Beatrice Bixby / Lady Redundant Woman ("The Return of the Reprise of Lady Redundant Woman" onward), Ms. Question, Mrs. Ripley
Daran Norris	Seymour Orlando Smooth, Nocan the Contrarian
Kristen Schaal	Victoria Best
Jeffrey Tambor	Shelly Smalls / Mr. Big, Mr. Birg
John C. McGinley	The Whammer
H. Jon Benjamin	Reginald the Jewelry Store Clerk, InvisiBill, Museum Curator
Mike O'Connell	Bill the Grocery Store Manager, Big Left Hand Guy, El Mysterioso, Ed the Used Car Salesman (season 1)
Larry Murphy	Amazing Rope Guy, Mr. Best, Stu Brisket, Dave, Anthony, Officer Jim, Zookeeper, Principal (in "A Few Words from WordGirl"), Ed the Used Car Salesman (seasons 2–8), Movie Theater Manager, Movie Theater Security Guard, Joe the Guard, Soccer Referee, Blackbeard's Buffett Manager, Anthony the News Reporter, African-American Cop
Stephen Root	Professor Robert Tubing
Ron Lynch	Mayor of Fair City
Amy Sedaris	Miss Jade Davis, Rhyme
John Henson	Captain Tangent ("Captain Tangent")
Brian Stack	Captain Tangent ("The Penny, the Pony, and the Pirate")
Ed Asner	Kid Potato
Ned Bellamy	The Coach
Jack McBrayer	Kid Math
Amanda Plummer	Beatrice Bixby / Lady Redundant Woman ("Lady Redundant Woman")
Jim Gaffigan	Mr. Dudley
Brian Posehn	Glen Furlblam / Dr. Three-Brains
"Weird Al" Yankovic	The Learnerer
James C. Mathis III	Tiny Big
Elliott Gould	Masked Meat Marauder
Jane Lynch	Ms. Power
Tyler Labine	Reason
A. D. Miles	Police Commissoner Watson (in "Swap Meat")
Wayne Knight	Police Commissoner Watson (in "The Wrong Side of the Law")
William Mapother	Guy Rich
Ellie Kemper	Rose Franklin
Brendon Small	Chazz
Tim Conway	Bampy Botsford
J. D. Cerna	Beau Handsome
Orlando Brown	Tommy
Kelly Miyahara	Emily
Jen Cohn	Rich Old Lady, Female Bank Tellers, Ms. Champlain, Ms. Libri

== Development ==
WordGirl began in 2006 as a series of shorts airing immediately after Maya & Miguel, becoming an independent show in September 2007.

The show's creator, Dorothea Gillim, believes that children's shows often underestimate children's intelligence:

Part of my mission is to make kids' television smart and funny. I feel as though we’ve lost some ground there, in an effort to make it more accessible. WordGirl's focus is on great stories, characters, and animation. If all those elements are working, then you can hook a child who may come looking for laughs but leave a little smarter.

Gillim says she created the show, in part, with the idea that parents would watch the show with their children to support their learning.

Each eleven-minute segment in each episode (except for the first three episodes) begins with verbal instructions to listen for two words that will be used throughout the plot of that episode. The words (examples include “diversion,” “cumbersome,” and “idolize”) are chosen according to academic guidelines. The reasoning is that children can understand words like "cumbersome" when told that it means "big and heavy and awkward".

PBS NewsHour anchor Jim Lehrer agreed to do a mock interview with WordGirl. Jack D. Ferraiolo, who developed the series with Gillim and served as the series' head writer in season one, received an Emmy for his work on WordGirl.

Rather than hiring writers experienced with children's television, the show's original writers' previous credits included The Onion and Family Guy. Narrator Chris Parnell had previously worked on Saturday Night Live.

== Format ==
Often, short animated segments are shown in between and at the end of episodes. "What's Your Favorite Word?", ostensibly hosted by Todd "Scoops" Ming, is a short jingle and a series of vox populi interviews asking random children what their favorite words are and why. A short game show segment called "May I Have a Word?" (stylized as MAYIHAVEAWORD in the text bubble on Beau Handsome's wall) airs following each eleven-minute segment. This segment features the game show host, Beau Handsome, asking three contestants the definition of a particular word. The segment was created by Kelly Miyahara, Barry Sonnenfeld, and Ryan Raddatz.

Yet another segment features the interstitials announcer (Rodger Parsons) asking Captain Huggy Face for a visual demonstration of a certain word (such as "strenuous" or "flummoxed"). When Captain Huggy Face correctly demonstrates the meaning of the word, a definition is given, followed by a victory dance by the chimpanzee sidekick.

During the four-part episode, "The Rise of Miss Power", a four-segment "Pretty Princess Power Hour" sketch is shown between acts, filling in for the average two-segment "May I Have a Word?" sketch, presumably to fill the double-length (52 minutes) time slot.

== Website ==
The companion site to WordGirl lives on PBS Kids, and was built by interactive firm Big Bad Tomato. It contains vocabulary-building games, a section where children can submit their favorite word, a video page with clips from the show (only available in the US for legal reasons), a "Heroes and Villains" section with character biographies and activities, and a PBS Parents section with episode guides, lessons, a site map, and more activities to play at home. As of January 4, 2026, the website currently redirects to its video page, as its games have not been migrated to the redesign that occurred in 2025.

== Comics ==
A series of WordGirl comics were also released by Boom! Studios' new KaBOOM! line. The names of the volumes and the stories within them are:

- Coalition of Malice
  1. Coalition of Malice
  2. Super Fans
- Incredible Shrinking Allowance
  1. The Incredible Shrinking Allowance
  2. Fondue, Fondon't
- Word Up!
  1. The Ham Van Makes the Man
  2. Think Big
- Fashion Disaster
  1. Fashion Disaster
  2. Fort Wham-Ground

== Awards ==
The show has received seven Daytime Emmy nominations, winning four for "Outstanding Writing in Animation" in 2008, 2012–2013 and Outstanding Writing in an Animated Program in 2015.

2008:

- 2008 Television Critics Association Award for Outstanding Achievement in Youth Programming, awarded July 19
- 2008 Daytime Emmy for Outstanding Writing in Animation

2009:

- Learning Magazine 2009 Teacher's Choice Award for Families
- 2009 iParenting Media Award
- Featured at the KIDS FIRST! Film Festival 2009
- NY Festivals' 2009 TV Programming and Promotions award

2012:

- 2012 Daytime Emmy for Outstanding Writing in Animation

2013:

- 2013 Daytime Emmy for Outstanding Writing in Animation

2015:

- 2015: Daytime Emmy for Outstanding Writing in an Animated Program

== Reception ==
The series was positively received. Emily Ashby of Common Sense Media described the series as having a "brainy heroine [who] uses vocab to outwit bad guys." She also called it an "entertaining animated series" with some cartoon violence and said that it is an "excellent...choice for young grade-schoolers."

In 2022, Collider attested that the "non-white, little girl superhero" protagonist of WordGirl began a television trend on social media. The article claims that the generation who grew up watching WordGirl later demanded new and diverse heroes, such as Captain Marvel.
