= List of WordGirl episodes =

WordGirl is an American animated superhero children's television series created by Dorothea Gillim. Soup2Nuts produced the series, which is presented by PBS Kids.

The series originally aired as short segments known as The Amazing Colossal Adventures of WordGirl from November 10, 2006 until October 10, 2007. The series aired from September 3, 2007 to August 7, 2015. Over the course of the series, 130 half-hours of WordGirl were produced, comprising 128 regular episodes and one double-length special. Almost each one consists of two separate segments, while others were full half-hour specials. Overall, the series includes 250 segments.

== Series overview ==
Season	Segments	Episodes	Originally released		
Season	Segments	Episodes	First released	Last released	Network
Shorts
Shorts	30	30	November 10, 2006	October 10, 2007	PBS Kids Go!
Episodes
1	52	26	September 3, 2007	January 2, 2009	PBS Kids Go!
2	50	26	November 4, 2008	July 20, 2010	PBS Kids Go!
3	25	13	September 7, 2010	July 8, 2011	PBS Kids Go!
4	27	15	September 6, 2011	June 11, 2012	PBS Kids Go!
5	25	13	September 10, 2012	June 14, 2013	PBS Kids Go!
6	21	11	August 5, 2013	June 6, 2014	PBS Kids Go! PBS Kids
7	25	13	August 4, 2014	February 20, 2015	PBS Kids
8	25	13	June 10, 2015	August 7, 2015	PBS Kids

== Shorts (2006–07) ==
The animated series WordGirl began as a series of shorts titled The Amazing Colossal Adventures of WordGirl that premiered on PBS Kids Go! on November 10, 2006. The two-minute episodes of the show aired at the end of Maya & Miguel, or online along with the one-minute episodes. There were twenty 2-minute episodes and ten 1-minute episodes.

=== Two-minute shorts ===
No.	Title	Villain	Original release date
1	"Catch as Catch Can"	None (Meteorite)	November 10, 2006
A giant meteoroid is about to hit the city, WordGirl prevents a cumbersome meteorite from destroying the city.
2	"Enter, the Butcher"	The Butcher	November 17, 2006
WordGirl meets the Butcher, the meat master and mangler of words, and tries to prevent him from robbing a bank. She also tries to convince the Butcher that he's not "a fender" but "offended" when she tells him he "butchers the English language".
3	"Re-Enter, the Butcher"	The Butcher	November 24, 2006
WordGirl tries to stop the Butcher from robbing Ye Olde Fancy Schmancy Jewelry Store. They also have to deal with a pompous store clerk.
4	"What's Up, Doc?"	The Butcher	December 1, 2006
WordGirl pays a visit to Professor Steven Boxleitner (author of the book called, Superheroes and You: A Practical Guide) to figure out a way to stop the vicious Butcher.
5	"Re-Re-Enter, the Butcher"	The Butcher	December 8, 2006
WordGirl tries to prevent the Butcher from robbing a grocery store. She also tries to clear up a misunderstanding between the Butcher and the Grocery Store Manager, who believes that the Butcher is there for a job.
6	"Yes Sir, That's My Butcher"	The Butcher	December 15, 2006
WordGirl and the Butcher face off for their big, big battle royale. WordGirl reveals her secret weapon: her always hungry ally, Captain Huggy Face.
7	"The Crazy World of Doctor Two-Brains"	Dr. Two-Brains	December 22, 2006
In a lab experiment that goes horribly wrong, Professor Steven Boxleitner accidentally fuses his mind with that of his vicious lab mouse and becomes the villainous Dr. Two-Brains. Becky (WordGirl's secret identity) tries to distract her little brother TJ so she can transform into WordGirl and capture Dr. Two Brains before he goes on a cheese-stealing rampage.
8	"Two-Brains in the Grocers"	Dr. Two-Brains	December 29, 2006
WordGirl tries to capture Dr. Two Brains after he eats all the cheese in the grocery store, but Dr. Two Brains is able to escape by causing a ruckus.
9	"The Times, They Are A-Cheesy"	Dr. Two-Brains	January 5, 2007
The Botsford family (including Becky Botsford, a.k.a. WordGirl) are flabbergasted when Dr. Two Brains appear on television, threatening to turn the city into goop if he doesn't get every piece of cheese in the city.
10	"Mouse Trap"	Dr. Two-Brains	January 12, 2007
WordGirl and Captain Huggy Face confront Dr. Two Brains at his secret hideout. Dr. Two Brains proves that their attacks on him would be futile by capturing them in his giant mousetrap. They escape before Dr. Two Brains succeed in turning them into goop.
11	"Squeaky's Machine"	Dr. Two-Brains	January 15, 2007
Dr. Two Brains is about to use his Goop Ray to give WordGirl and Captain Huggy Face a "one-way ticket to Goop Town". They can escape this predicament while Dr. Two Brains is distracted by cheese related questions from the Botsford family.
12	"Driving Miss Granny"	Granny May and Eugene	January 16, 2007
New elderly villainous Granny May and her timid, enormous grandson, Eugene, both rob an armored car in broad daylight then WordGirl is able to catch up with them.
13	"Kiss My Granny"	Granny May and Eugene	January 17, 2007
While trying to stop Granny May from robbing Ye Olde Fancy Schmancy Jewelry store, WordGirl and Huggy are blinded by Granny's dazzling jewelry, then captured in her knitted "Web of Yarn". They will be able to escape before Eugene crushes them in a game of "squish the knitting".
14	"Living in the Granny's Paradise"	Granny May and Eugene	January 18, 2007
Although WordGirl and Captain Huggy Face are able to use their coordination to escape Granny's trap, they are soon caught in the unbreakable grip of Eugene. They will be able to break free and stop Granny from escaping with the stolen jewelry.
15	"Play Date"	Theodore "Tobey" McCallister III	January 19, 2007
After destroying a giant, rampaging robot as WordGirl, Becky returns home to find that she has an unexpected playdate with Theodore McAllister III. When Becky discovers that Theodore is actually "Tobey", the mischievous genius behind the giant robot's rampage, she risks revealing her secret identity.
16	"Tobey or Not Tobey"	Theodore "Tobey" McCallister III	January 26, 2007
Tobey and Becky argue over whether Tobey's robot caused real damage to the city or only a minor hullabaloo. Tobey decides to play a game with Becky to see if she's really WordGirl or not.
17	"The Wrath of Tobey"	Theodore "Tobey" McCallister III	February 2, 2007
Tobey gives Becky an impossible choice: reveal herself as WordGirl and destroy the robot threatening her house or do nothing and watch her house get demolished. Becky and Bob (a.k.a. Captain Huggy Face) initiate Emergency Plan #47, with mixed results.
18	"Chuck, the Evil Sandwich Making Guy"	Chuck the Evil Sandwich Making Guy	February 9, 2007
Chuck the Evil Sandwich Making Guy threatens to squash the Grocery Store Manager with his giant sandwich press after the Owner calls the press "extreme". WordGirl stops him in time and Scoops gets the sandwich he ordered.
19	"Name That Dude"	Chuck the Evil Sandwich Making Guy	February 16, 2007
WordGirl and the Narrator have a hard time not laughing at Chuck, the Evil Sandwich Making Guy's name. Chuck captures WordGirl with his noxious "Pickled Eggs". As WordGirl, Scoops, and the Grocery Store Manager head towards certain doom on the giant sandwich press, all of them try to think of a less absurd name for Chuck. Meanwhile, Captain Huggy Face races to the rescue.
20	"Chucky and the Sandwich Factory"	Chuck the Evil Sandwich Making Guy	February 23, 2007
WordGirl sends Captain Huggy Face to search for the "ultimate crowbar" in order to help them escape Chuck, the Evil Sandwich Making Guy's giant sandwich press. Captain Huggy Face was able to find the "ultimate crowbar" in time.

=== One-minute shorts ===
No.	Title	Villain	Original release date
21	"Movie Trailer"	N/A	2006
The origin story of WordGirl and Captain Huggy Face.
22	"WordGirl and the Butcher"	The Butcher	2006
WordGirl tries to prevent the Butcher from setting off his "Steak Bomb" and ruining the day of vegetarians citywide.
23	"WordGirl and Chuck, the Evil Sandwich Making Guy"	Chuck the Evil Sandwich Making Guy	2006
WordGirl and Captain Huggy Face struggle to break free from Chuck, the Evil Sandwich Making Guy's "Atomic Hot Dog Lasso".
24–25	"WordGirl and Dr. Two-Brains"	Dr. Two-Brains	2006
Dr. Two Brains becomes frustrated with a malfunctioning trap. WordGirl tries to thwart Dr. Two Brains' latest scheme but is distracted by a yummy mixed-fruit beverage.
26–27	"WordGirl and Captain Huggy Face"	Tobey's robots	2006
WordGirl makes Captain Huggy Face try on some new costumes because she feels his regular costume lacks pizzazz. When Captain Huggy Face is late for a robot battle because of the bus schedule, WordGirl suggests some other modes of transportation.
28	"Becky and Scoops"	N/A	2006
Scoops ponders WordGirl's secret identity while Becky saves him from perils that he doesn't notice.
29	"WordGirl and the Narrator"	N/A	2006
WordGirl wants a new Super Hero name. She convinces the Narrator to put his reputation on hold and announce the new name she has in mind, just to see how it sounds.
30	"Becky and Mr. Botsford"	N/A	2006
Despite certain clues, Mr. Botsford is oblivious to WordGirl's secret identity.

== Episodes ==
=== Season 1 (2007–09) ===
No. overall	No. in season	Title	Vocab words	Written by	Villains	May I Have a Word?	Original release date	Prod. code
1a*	1a	"Tobey or Consequences"	Enormous, Bicker	Jack Ferraiolo	Theodore "Tobey" McCallister III	Hurl	September 3, 2007	101A
1b*	1b	"High-Fat Robbery"	Impressive, Diversion	Peggy Nicoll	The Butcher	Hurl (bonus round)	September 3, 2007	101B
2a*	2a	"You Can't Crush City Hall"	Doomed, Hustle	Kevin Seccia and Jack Ferraiolo	Chuck the Evil Sandwich Making Guy	Pounce	September 14, 2007	102A
2b*	2b	"Two-Brain Highway"	Coincidence, Guarantee	Jack Ferraiolo	Dr. Two-Brains	Pounce (bonus round)	September 14, 2007	102B
3a*	3a	"Coupon Madness"	Squint, Coupon	Johanna Stein and Will Shepard	Granny May	Stroll	September 21, 2007	103A
3b*	3b	"When Life Gives You Potatoes..."	Transformation, Glum	Johanna Stein and Jack Ferraiolo	Dr. Two-Brains	Stroll (bonus round)	September 21, 2007	103B
4a	4a	"Jerky Jerk"	Clumsy, Supreme	Jack Ferraiolo	The Butcher	Devour	September 28, 2007	104A
4b	4b	"Becky's Birthday"	Appetite, Expand	Chris Karwowski	Energy Monster, Dr. Two-Brains (no crime committed except stealing cheese)	Devour (bonus round)	September 28, 2007	104B
5a	5a	"Chuck!"	Traditional, Confusing	Matt Fleckenstein	Chuck the Evil Sandwich Making Guy	Dazzling	October 5, 2007	105A
5b	5b	"Down with Word Up"	Deceive, Idolize	Danielle Koenig	Granny May	Dazzling (bonus round)	October 5, 2007	105B
6a	6a	"Book Ends"	Destroy, Predictable	Peggy Nicoll	Theodore "Tobey" McCallister III	Soar	October 19, 2007	106A
6b	6b	"Mr. Big"	Vague, Specific	Jack Ferraiolo	Mr. Big	Soar (bonus round)	October 19, 2007	106B
7a	7a	"Super-Grounded"	Disappointed, Preposterous	Joe Garden and Anita Serwacki	The Butcher	Swerve	November 23, 2007	107A
7b	7b	"Mouse Army"	Depend, Stampede	Chris Karwowski	Dr. Two-Brains	Swerve (bonus round)	November 23, 2007	107B
8a	8a	"Tobey's Masterpiece"	Masterpiece, Gasp	Matt Fleckenstein	Theodore "Tobey" McCallister III	Smash	December 7, 2007	108A
8b	8b	"Chuck the Nice Pencil-Selling Guy"	Stubborn, Compromise	Danielle Koenig	Chuck the Evil Sandwich Making Guy	Smash (bonus round)	December 7, 2007	108B
9a	9a	"The Birthday Girl"	Generous, Exaggerate	Peggy Nicoll	Eileen the Birthday Girl	Scowl	December 21, 2007	109A
9b	9b	"Granny-Sitter"	Investigate, Accelerate	Peggy Nicoll	Granny May	Scowl (bonus round)	December 21, 2007	109B
10a	10a	"Mr. Big's Big Plan"	Decide, Opponent	Peggy Nicoll	Mr. Big	Enormous	February 15, 2008	110A
10b	10b	"Vocab Bee"	Perfect, Suspicious	Matt Fleckenstein	The Butcher	Enormous (bonus round)	February 15, 2008	110B
11a	11a	"Shrinkin' in the Ray"	Increase, Decrease	Ben Zelevansky	Dr. Two-Brains	Dazed	February 18, 2008	111A
11b	11b	"Department Store Tobey"	Malfunction, Clever	Regan G. Toews	Theodore "Tobey" McCallister III	Dazed (bonus round)	February 18, 2008	111B
12a	12a	"Chuck E. Sneeze"	Avoid, Contagious	Peggy Nicoll	Chuck the Evil Sandwich Making Guy	Hurl	April 11, 2008	112A
12b	12b	"Swap Meat"	Forgery, Magnificent	Ben Zelevansky	The Butcher	Hurl (bonus round)	April 11, 2008	112B
13a	13a	"Granny's Goodtime All Cure Spritzer"	Hoax, Potent	Ethan Banville	Granny May	Pounce	April 18, 2008	113A
13b	13b	"Mecha-Mouse"	Identical, Astonished	Dan Milledge	Dr. Two-Brains	Pounce (bonus round)	April 18, 2008	113B
14a	14a	"Princess Triana and the Ogre of Castlebum"	Reveal, Devotion	Ethan Banville	Theodore "Tobey" McCallister III	Stroll	April 25, 2008	114A
14b	14b	"Heat Wave, Crime Wave"	Swelter, Opportunity	Regan G. Toews	Granny May	Stroll (bonus round)	April 25, 2008	114B
15a	15a	"Thorn in the Sidekick"	Sidekick, Exasperate	Chris Karwowski	Chuck the Evil Sandwich Making Guy and the Whammer	Devour	May 26, 2008	115A
15b	15b	"Crime Takes a Holiday"	Replacement, Gloat	Ryan Raddatz	Glen Furlblam	Devour (bonus round)	May 26, 2008	115B
16a	16a	"Meat with a Side of Cute"	Frantic, Adorable	Joe Garden and Anita Serwacki	The Butcher	Dazzling	May 27, 2008	116A
16b	16b	"Mr. Big Words"	Clarify, Proceed	Peggy Nicoll	Mr. Big	Dazzling (bonus round)	May 27, 2008	116B
17a	17a	"Two-Brains Forgets"	Quarrel, Identity	Peggy Nicoll	Dr. Two-Brains	Soar	June 13, 2008	117A
17b	17b	"Banned on the Run"	Banned, Restore	Matt Fleckenstein	Mr. Big	Soar (bonus round)	June 13, 2008	117B
18a	18a	"Have You Seen the Remote?"	President, Baffling	Peggy Nicoll	Theodore "Tobey" McCallister III	Swerve	July 11, 2008	118A
18b	18b	"Sidekicked to the Curb"	Motivate, Finale	Ryan Raddatz	The Whammer and The Coach	Swerve (bonus round)	July 11, 2008	118B
19a	19a	"Lady Redundant Woman"	Perplexed, Redundant	Matt Fleckenstein	Lady Redundant Woman	Smash	July 23, 2008	119A
19b	19b	"A Game of Cat and Mouse"	Texture, Weakness	Will Shepard	Dr. Two-Brains	Smash (bonus round)	July 23, 2008	119B
20a	20a	"The Masked Meat Marauder"	Rival, Morale	Will Shepard	The Butcher and The Masked Meat Marauder	Scowl	August 15, 2008	120A
20b	20b	"Sandwich World"	Compliment, Lair	Matt Fleckenstein	Chuck the Evil Sandwich Making Guy	Scowl (bonus round)	August 15, 2008	120B
21a	21a	"Violet Superhero"	Catchphrase, Confide	Peggy Nicoll	The Butcher	Enormous	September 12, 2008	121A
21b	21b	"Big Business"	Gibberish, Brilliant	Ben Zelevansky	Mr. Big	Enormous (bonus round)	September 12, 2008	121B
22a	22a	"The Handsome Panther"	Ferocious, Design	Ryan Raddatz	Chuck (as the Handsome Panther)	Dazed	October 13, 2008	122A
22b	22b	"The Butcher, the Baker, and the Candlestick Maker"	Finicky, Trio	Will Shepard	The Butcher	Dazed (bonus round)	October 13, 2008	122B
23a	23a	"Mousezilla"	Collaborate, Quest	Peggy Nicoll	Theodore "Tobey" McCallister III and Dr. Two-Brains	Hurl	November 3, 2008	123A
23b	23b	"Villain School"	Novice, Legendary	Matt Fleckenstein	The Coach, The Whammer, Novice villains (Timmy Tim-Bo, Big Left Hand Guy, and Ms. Question)	Hurl (bonus round)	November 3, 2008	123B
24a	24a	"Return of the Reprise of Lady Redundant Woman"	Elegant, Incognito	Will Shepard	Lady Redundant Woman	Pounce	November 28, 2008**	124A
24b	24b	"A Simple Plan"	Hideous, Complicated	Dannah Feinglass	Dr. Two-Brains	Pounce (bonus round)	November 28, 2008**	124B
25a	25a	"Granny Mayor"	Masquerade, Appreciate	Peggy Nicoll	Granny May	Stroll	January 1, 2009**	125A
25b	25b	"Tobey Goes Good"	Demonstrate, Mumble	Matt Fleckenstein	Theodore "Tobey" McCallister III	Stroll (bonus round)	January 1, 2009**	125B
26a	26a	"Bongo Rock"	Ponder, Mighty	Matt Fleckenstein	Chuck the Evil Sandwich Making Guy and Mr. Big	Devour	January 2, 2009**	126A
26b	26b	"Dr. Three-Brains"	Outdo, Unexpected	Will Shepard	Glen Furlblam (as Dr. Three-Brains)	Devour (bonus round)	January 2, 2009**	126B

=== Season 2 (2008–10) ===
No. overall	No. in season	Title	Vocab words	Written by	Villains	May I Have a Word?	Original release date	Prod. code
27a	1a	"A Vote for Becky"	Elect, Candidate	Hugh Fink	Theodore "Tobey" McCallister III	Pounce	November 4, 2008	201A
27b	1b	"Class Act"	Ramble, Articulate	Jack Ferraiolo	The Butcher	Pounce (bonus round)	November 4, 2008	201B
28a	2a	"The Two-Brains Boogie"	Shimmy, Indestructible	Jack Ferraiolo	Dr. Two-Brains	Evade	February 16, 2009	202A
28b	2b	"Field Day Fun with Robo-Tobey"	Authentic, Competition	Ryan Raddatz	Theodore "Tobey" McCallister III	Evade (bonus round)	February 16, 2009	202B
29a	3a	"Slumber Party Pooper"	Blurt, Nuisance	Will Shepard	Eileen the Birthday Girl	Disguise	February 17, 2009	203A
29b	3b	"Line Lessons with Lady Redundant Woman"	Impolite, Oodles	Matt Fleckenstein and Tom Martin	Lady Redundant Woman	Disguise (bonus round)	February 17, 2009	203B
30a	4a	"Mr. Big's Dolls and Dollars"	Constantly, Indignant	Ryan Raddatz	Mr. Big	Fatigued	March 23, 2009	204A
30b	4b	"Great Granny May"	Doting, Evidence	Will Shepard	Granny May	Fatigued (bonus round)	March 23, 2009	204B
31a	5a	"Theme Park WHAMpage"	Patience, Enthusiastic	Matt Fleckenstein	The Whammer	Stench	March 24, 2009	205A
31b	5b	"Chuck Makes a Buck"	Stupendous, Edible	Carla Filisha	Chuck the Evil Sandwich Making Guy	Stench (bonus round)	March 24, 2009	205B
32a	6a	"Highway to Havarti"	Leisure, Berserk	John N. Huss	Dr. Two-Brains	Snare	April 30, 2009	206A
32b	6b	"Tiny Big"	Fad, Limelight	Kim Samek	Mr. Big and Tiny Big	Snare (bonus round)	April 30, 2009	206B
33a	7a	"I Think I'm a Clone Now"	Thesaurus, Malicious	Sergio Cilli and Eric Ledgin	Lady Redundant Woman and Evil Malicious WordGirl Copy	Crestfallen	May 1, 2009	207A
33b	7b	"Answer All My Questions and Win Stuff"	Contestant, Permission	Jack Ferraiolo	Seymour Orlando Smooth	Crestfallen (bonus round)	May 1, 2009	207B
34a	8a	"Bonkers for Bingo"	Undefeated, Adore	Ryan Raddatz	Granny May	Silhouette	May 4, 2009	208A
34b	8b	"The Ballad of Steve McClean"	Snazzy, Heist	Will Shepard	Dr. Two-Brains and Steve McClean	Silhouette (bonus round)	May 4, 2009	208B
35a	9a	"Pretty Princess Premiere"	Anticipate, Premiere	Hugh Fink	Energy Monster	Hover	June 19, 2009	210A
35b	9b	"Where's Huggy?"	Rehearse, Shrug	Carla Filisha	The Butcher (no crimes committed)	Hover (bonus round)	June 19, 2009	210B
36a	10a	"Robo-Camping"	Independent, Serene	Sergio Cilli and Eric Ledgin	Theodore "Tobey" McCallister III	Tiff	July 13, 2009	211A
36b	10b	"The Stew, the Proud..."	Overdue, Arrogant	Will Shepard	The Butcher and Raul Demiglasse	Tiff (bonus round)	July 13, 2009	211B
37a	11a	"Who Wants Candy?"	Awestruck, Mastermind	John N. Huss	Eileen the Birthday Girl	Evade	July 14, 2009	212A
37b	11b	"Chuck's Brother"	Sibling, Envious	Carla Filisha	Chuck the Evil Sandwich Making Guy	Evade (bonus round)	July 14, 2009	212B
38a	12a	"Becky and the Bard"	Shimmer, Memorize	Ryan Raddatz	Energy Monster	Disguise	September 7, 2009	213A
38b	12b	"Monkey-Robot Showdown"	Champion, Vanquish	John N. Huss	Theodore "Tobey" McCallister III	Disguise (bonus round)	September 7, 2009	213B
39	13	"The Wrong Side of the Law"	Examine, Priceless Guilty, Objection	Eric Ledgin (Part 1) Scott Ganz and Andrew Samson (Part 2)	Eileen the Birthday Girl	Fatigued	October 12, 2009	214
40a	14a	"Two-Brains Quartet"	Melodious, Quartet	Sergio Cilli	Dr. Two-Brains	Stench	October 13, 2009	215A
40b	14b	"Big's Big Bounce"	Boost, Tempting	Ryan Raddatz	Mr. Big	Stench (bonus round)	October 13, 2009	215B
41a	15a	"The Young and the Meatless"	Duplicate, Interruption	Jack Ferraiolo	The Butcher and Lady Redundant Woman	Snare	October 14, 2009	216A
41b	15b	"Mr. Big's Colossal Mini-Golf"	Colossal, Scoff	Kim Samek	Mr. Big	Snare (bonus round)	October 14, 2009	216B
42a	16a	"Nocan the Contrarian"	Contrary, Exquisite	Ryan Raddatz	Nocan the Contrarian	Crestfallen	October 15, 2009	217A
42b	16b	"Meat My Dad"	Nemesis, Badger	Jack Ferraiolo	The Butcher and Kid Potato	Crestfallen (bonus round)	October 15, 2009	217B
43a	17a	"Tobey's Tricks and Treats"	Eerie, Supernatural	Kim Samek	Theodore "Tobey" McCallister III	Petrified	October 23, 2009	209A
43b	17b	"Escape Wham"	Potential, Boisterous	Jack Ferraiolo	Chuck the Evil Sandwich Making Guy and The Whammer	Petrified (bonus round)	October 23, 2009	209B
44a	18a	"Who is Ms. Question?"	Inquire, Hilarious	Eric Ledgin	Ms. Question	Silhouette	November 23, 2009	218A
44b	18b	"Lunch Lady Chuck"	Disorderly, Famished	John N. Huss	Chuck the Evil Sandwich Making Guy	Silhouette (bonus round)	November 23, 2009	218B
45a	19a	"Oh, Holiday Cheese"	Curmudgeon, Festivity	Carla Filisha	Dr. Two-Brains	Petrified	December 10, 2009	219A
45b	19b	"Ch-ch-ch-Change Day"	Quandary, Fidget	Patrick Downie	The Butcher	Petrified (bonus round)	December 10, 2009	219B
46	20	"WordGirl Makes a Mistake"	Flawless, Dominate Potent †, Mission	Kim Samek (Part 1) Adam F. Goldberg and Chris Bishop (Part 2)	Mr. Big	Hover	December 28, 2009	220
47a	21a	"Opposite Day"	Extravaganza, Antonym	Ryan Raddatz	Nocan the Contrarian	Evade	February 15, 2010	222A
47b	21b	"Granny's Book Club"	Feisty, Retire	Carla Filisha	Granny May	Evade (bonus round)	February 15, 2010	222B
48a	22a	"Earth Day Girl"	Recycle, Excess	John N. Huss	Eileen the Birthday Girl	Tiff	March 1, 2010	221A
48b	22b	"A Hero, a Thief, a Store and Its Owner"	Version, Recollect	Jack Ferraiolo	Chuck the Evil Sandwich Making Guy	Tiff (bonus round)	March 1, 2010	221B
49a	23a	"Wham Up"	Assist, Blunder	Eric Ledgin	The Whammer	Disguise	May 3, 2010	223A
49b	23b	"Seeds of Doubt"	Doubt, Refresh	Rick Groel	Ms. Question	Disguise (bonus round)	May 3, 2010	223B
50a	24a	"Wishful Thinking"	Gleaming, Hoodwinked	Bruce Clark	Seymour Orlando Smooth	Fatigued	May 4, 2010	224A
50b	24b	"Lady Redundant Woman Gets the Blues"	Admire, Greedy	Sergio Cilli	Lady Redundant Woman and Royal Dandy	Fatigued (bonus round)	May 4, 2010	224B
51a	25a	"Win a Shiny New Car"	Legitimate, Elated	Scott Ganz and Andrew Samson	Seymour Orlando Smooth	Stench	July 19, 2010	225A
51b	25b	"The People vs. Ms. Question"	Befuddled, Justice	Carla Filisha	Ms. Question	Stench (bonus round)	July 19, 2010	225B
52a	26a	"Oh, What a Tangled Knot You Tie, Amazing Rope Guy"	Imposter, Untangle	Eric Ledgin	The Amazing Rope Guy	Snare	July 20, 2010	226A
52b	26b	"Kids Action News"	Tantalizing, United	Ryan Raddatz	Chuck the Evil Sandwich Making Guy and Dr. Two-Brains	Snare (bonus round)	July 20, 2010	226B

=== Season 3 (2010–11) ===
No. overall	No. in season	Title	Vocab words	Written by	Villains	May I Have a Word?	Original release date	Prod. code
53a	1a	"Bummertime"	Prolong, Aggravated	John N. Huss	Theodore "Tobey" McCallister III	Collection	September 7, 2010	301A
53b	1b	"The Homerun King"	Extraordinary, Fortunate(ly)	Ryan Raddatz	Dr. Two-Brains	Collection (bonus round)	September 7, 2010	301B
54a	2a	"Granny and Clyde"	Injury, Spree	Carla Filisha	Granny May	Doze	September 13, 2010	302A
54b	2b	"Too Loud Crew"	Considerate, Manual	Jack Ferraiolo	The Butcher and The Whammer	Doze (bonus round)	September 13, 2010	302B
55a	3a	"The Invisi-Bill Hand"	Conceal, Acknowledge	Eric Ledgin	Invisi-Bill and Big Left Hand Guy	Elegant	September 14, 2010	303A
55b	3b	"Birthday Town"	Mimic, Hoopla	Sergio Cilli and Tom Martin	Mr. Big and Eileen the Birthday Girl	Elegant (bonus round)	September 14, 2010	303B
56a	4a	"The Pretty Princess and Mr. Big Power Hour"	Dupe, Hoist	Eric Ledgin	Mr. Big	Shatter	September 15, 2010	304A
56b	4b	"Clean Up in Aisle Eleven"	Debate, Substitute	Ryan Raddatz	Lady Redundant Woman	Shatter (bonus round)	September 15, 2010	304B
57a	5a	"When Chuck's Mom Is Away..."	Reckless, Immaculate	Jack Ferraiolo	Dr. Two-Brains, Dr. Two-Brains' Henchmen, Lady Redundant Woman, Butcher, Big Left Hand Guy, Mr. Big, Leslie, Amazing Rope Guy, Coach, Eileen the Birthday Girl, Granny May, Theodore "Tobey" McCallister III, and Seymour Orlando Smooth	Smudge	September 16, 2010	305A
57b	5b	"That's Entertainment"	Entertainment, Persistent	Carla Filisha	Energy Monster	Smudge (bonus round)	September 16, 2010	305B
58a	6a	"Victoria Best"	Trophy, Boast	Scott Ganz and Andrew Samson	Victoria Best	Binoculars	October 11, 2010	306A
58b	6b	"Showdown at the Secret Spaceship Hideout"	Frolic, Procrastinate	Ryan and Steve Young	Dr. Two-Brains	Binoculars (bonus round)	October 11, 2010	306B
59a	7a	"Captain Tangent"	Valuable, Tangent	John N. Huss	Captain Tangent	Imitate	November 8, 2010	307A
59b	7b	"Chuck and Brent Ride Again"	Confidence, Zest	Carla Filisha	Chuck the Evil Sandwich Making Guy	Imitate (bonus round)	November 8, 2010	307B
60a	8a	"Bend It Like Becky"	Ricochet, Dismay(ed)	Scott Ganz and Andrew Samson	Dr. Two-Brains	Bewilder	December 20, 2010	308A
60b	8b	"Questionable Behavior"	Fluster, Confess	Rick Groel	Ms. Question	Bewilder (bonus round)	December 20, 2010	308B
61a	9a	"Bampy Battles Bots"	Invincible, Fiction(al)	Ryan Raddatz	Theodore Tobey McCallister III	Collection	January 17, 2011	311A
61b	9b	"Truth, Revision, and the Lexicon Way"	Revise/Revision, Mislead(ing)	Shane Casey	Mr. Big	Collection (bonus round)	January 17, 2011	311B
62a	10a	"Cherish is the Word"	Flee, Cherish	Eric Ledgin	Theodore "Tobey" McCallister III and Victoria Best	Perspire	February 8, 2011	310A
62b	10b	"Granny's Intuition"	Intuition, Charming	John N. Huss	Granny May	Perspire (bonus round)	February 8, 2011	310B
63a	11a	"The Straw That Broke Dr. Two-Brains' Back"	Recreation, Abrupt	Jack Ferraiolo	Dr. Two-Brains	Strenuous	April 1, 2011	309A
63b	11b	"Nocan the Evil Ingredient Finding Guy"	Scrumptious, Apprentice	Ryan Raddatz	Chuck the Evil Sandwich Making Guy and Nocan the Contrarian	Strenuous (bonus round)	April 1, 2011	309B
64a	12a	"Meat-Life Crisis"	Mope, Vendor	Rick Groel	The Butcher and Kid Potato	Doze	May 6, 2011	311A
64b	12b	"Mobot Knows Best"	Peeved, Communicate	Sergio Cilli	Theodore Tobey McCallister III	Doze (bonus round)	May 6, 2011	311B
65	13	"A Better Mousetrap"	Reminisce, Skirmish Cliffhanger, Irk	Ryan Raddatz (Part 1) Eric Ledgin (Part 2)	Dr. Two-Brains	Elegant	July 8, 2011	313

=== Season 4 (2011–12) ===
No. overall	No. in season	Title	Vocab words	Written by	Villains	May I Have a Word?	Original release date	Prod. code
66a	1a	"Sonny Days with a Chance of Showers"	Precipitation, Meteorologist	Carla Filisha	Eileen the Birthday Girl	Shatter	September 5, 2011	401A
66b	1b	"Seymour ... Right After This"	Delay, Captivated	Scott Ganz and Andrew Samson	Seymour Orlando Smooth	Shatter (bonus round)	September 5, 2011	401B
67a	2a	"The Fill-In"	Surrender, Temporary	Jack Ferraiolo	Dr. Two-Brains and The Butcher	Smudge	October 10, 2011	402A
67b	2b	"Word (Hicc)Up!"	Remedy, Glitch	John N. Huss	Chuck the Evil Sandwich Making Guy and Hal Hardbargain	Smudge (bonus round)	October 10, 2011	402B
68a	3a	"Mouse Brain Take-Over"	Abandon, Dilemma	Jack Ferraiolo	Dr. Two-Brains	Binoculars	October 11, 2011	403A
68b	3b	"Leslie Makes It Big"	Ridiculous, Assume	Sergio Cilli	Mr. Big & Leslie	Binoculars (bonus round)	October 11, 2011	403B
69a	4a	"Chuck with a Sidekick of Brent"	Accomplish, Schedule	Carla Filisha	Chuck the Evil Sandwich Making Guy	Imitate	October 12, 2011	404A
69b	4b	"Yarn-4-Gold"	Rubbish, Swap	Ryan Raddatz	Granny May	Imitate (bonus round)	October 12, 2011	404B
70a	5a	"Whammer Anniversary"	Glimpse, Occasion	Tom Martin and Rick Groel	The Whammer	Bewilder	October 13, 2011	405A
70b	5b	"Rat Trap"	Confiscate, Whiz	Eric Ledgin	Dr. Two-Brains and Hal Hardbargain	Bewilder (bonus round)	October 13, 2011	405B
71a	6a	"WordGirl and Bobbleboy"	Bobble, Souvenir	Ryan Raddatz	First Energy Monster, then Chuck the Evil Sandwich Making Guy, and finally Dr. Two-Brains	Strenuous	October 14, 2011	406A
71b	6b	"Crime in the Key of V"	Exceptional, Meddle	Scott Ganz and Andrew Samson	Victoria Best	Strenuous (bonus round)	October 14, 2011	406B
72a	7a	"Where Have All the Villains Gone?"	Eliminate, Entire	Carla Filisha	Ms. Question	Perspire	November 14, 2011	407A
72b	7b	"Captain Tangent Returns"	Vessel, Publish	John N. Huss	Captain Tangent	Perspire (bonus round)	November 14, 2011	407B
73	8	"A World Without WordGirl"	Obligation, Antsy Enchanted, Unusual	Scott Ganz and Andrew Samson Ryan Raddatz	Chuck the Evil Sandwich Making Guy, The Butcher, Dr. Two-Brains, Energy Monster and Theodore "Tobey" McCallister III (cameo)	Binoculars	December 16, 2011	413
74a	9a	"Have Snob, Will Travel"	Formal, Fret	Jack Ferraiolo	The Butcher	Collection	January 16, 2012	408A
74b	9b	"Tobey's Playground Calamity"	Dedicate, Calamity	Sergio Cilli and Tom Martin	Theodore "Tobey" McCallister III	Collection (bonus round)	January 16, 2012	408B
75 76	10 11	"The Rise of Miss Power"	Harsh, Vigor, Encouraging, Ploy	Jack Ferraiolo	Miss Power and practically every other WordGirl villain	Cower and Dangle	February 20, 2012 (Note: This episode was originally produced as a 52-minute special; it would later be recut into a pair of two-part 26-minute episodes. The edited version aired as part of season 6 on August 13, 2013.)	414
75 76	10 11	"The Rise of Miss Power"	Harsh, Vigor, Encouraging, Ploy	Jack Ferraiolo	Miss Power and practically every other WordGirl villain	Cower and Dangle	February 20, 2012	415
77a	12a	"The Learnerer"	Suffix, Misjudge	Jack Ferraiolo	The Learnerer	Elegant	March 23, 2012	410A
77b	12b	"Mr. Big's Dinner and a Scam"	Embellish, Leery	Jayne Hamil	Mr. Big	Elegant (bonus round)	March 23, 2012	410B
78a	13a	"The Birthday Girl's Monstrous Gift"	Guzzle, Monstrous	Douglas Reid	Energy Monster and Eileen the Birthday Girl	Doze	April 16, 2012	409A
78b	13b	"Hal the Haggler"	Defend, Haggle	Sergio Cilli and Kevin Petersen	Granny May and Hal Hardbargain	Doze (bonus round)	April 16, 2012	409B
79a	14a	"WordBot"	Devoted, Backfire	Rick Groel	Theodore "Tobey" McCallister III and WordBot	Shatter	May 21, 2012	411A
79b	14b	"Mount Rush Here"	Advantage, Tribute	Adam F. Goldberg and Chris Bishop	Mr. Big	Shatter (bonus round)	May 21, 2012	411B
80a	15a	"Road Rage, Anger, and Fury"	Obstacle, Rant	Ryan Raddatz	Lady Redundant Woman	Smudge	June 11, 2012	412A
80b	15b	"By Jove, You've Wrecked My Robots!"	Savvy, Realize	Jack Ferraiolo	Theodore "Tobey" McCallister III	Smudge (bonus round)	June 11, 2012	412B

=== Season 5 (2012–13) ===
No. overall	No. in season	Title	Vocab words	Written by	Villains	May I Have a Word?	Original release date	Prod. code
81a	1a	"Seize the Cheese"	Seize, Savor	Scott Ganz and Andrew Samson	Dr. Two-Brains	Apprehend	September 10, 2012	501A
81b	1b	"Ms. Question's Riddle Rampage"	Stranded, Puzzled	Ryan Raddatz	Ms. Question and Theodore "Tobey" McCallister III (cameo)	Apprehend (bonus round)	September 10, 2012	501B
82a	2a	"The Meaty Dimension"	Portal, Overpower	Jack Ferraiolo	The Butcher	Perspire	September 11, 2012	502A
82b	2b	"The Case of the Copied Mrs. Botsford"	Gripe, Convince	Carla Filisha	Lady Redundant Woman	Perspire (bonus round)	September 11, 2012	502B
83a	3a	"The Good, The Bad, and the Chucky"	Pursue, Yearn	Douglas Reid	Chuck the Evil Sandwich Making Guy and Dr. Two-Brains	Clutch	September 12, 2012	503A
83b	3b	"Granny's Pet Plan"	Accessory, Misplace	Jayne Hamil	Granny May	Clutch (bonus round)	September 12, 2012	503B
84a	4a	"Hard-Learned Money"	Divvy, Repetitive	Eric Ledgin	The Learnerer and The Amazing Rope Guy	Console	September 13, 2012	504A
84b	4b	"Gift Pony"	Woozy, Brooch	Brian Swenlin	The Whammer	Console (bonus round)	September 13, 2012	504B
85a	5a	"Scary with a Side of Butter"	Legend, Artichoke	Jayne Hamil	Mr. Big	Flicker	October 29, 2012	505A
85b	5b	"Talent Show Tobey"	Discombobulated, Essential	Ryan Raddatz	Theodore "Tobey" MacCallister III	Flicker (bonus round)	October 29, 2012	505B
86a	6a	"Don't Mess with the Best"	Defeat, Unstoppable	Scott Ganz and Andrew Samson	Victoria Best	Cower	December 28, 2012	506A
86b	6b	"Peanut Butter Battles"	Envelop, Hinder	Stephen Sustarsic	Chuck the Evil Sandwich Making Guy	Cower (bonus round)	December 28, 2012	506B
87a	7a	"Hello New Year, Goodbye Moon"	Massive, Resolution	Ryan Raddatz	Dr. Two-Brains	Perspire	December 31, 2012	510A
87b	7b	"Art in the Park"	Performance, Ruse	Eric Ledgin	Mr. Big	Perspire (bonus round)	December 31, 2012	510B
88a	8a	"Plain Old Mischief Makers"	Diminish, Declare	Eric Ledgin	Invisi-Bill and Big Left Hand Guy	Dangle	March 11, 2013	507A
88b	8b	"House Arrest"	Release, Rowdy	Stephen Sustarsic	Chuck the Evil Sandwich Making Guy	Dangle (bonus round)	March 11, 2013	507B
89a	9a	"Monkey Business"	Recall, Zeal	Laurie Israel and Rachel Ruderman	Chuck the Evil Sandwich Making Guy	Apprehend	March 12, 2013	509A
89b	9b	"Say it Again, Eileen"	Stymie, Guidance	Douglas Reid	Eileen the Birthday Girl	Apprehend (bonus round)	March 12, 2013	509B
90a	10a	"Best Fan Club Meeting Ever"	Rumor, Deadline	George Beckerman, Jack Ferraiolo and Steven Young	The Butcher	Clutch	March 13, 2013	511A
90b	10b	"Day at the Museum"	Divulge, Eavesdrop	Scott Ganz and Andrew Samson	Theodore "Tobey" MacCallister III	Clutch (bonus round)	March 13, 2013	511B
91a	11a	"Who's Your Granny?"	Interact, Contraption	Douglas Reid	Granny May	Console	March 14, 2013	512A
91b	11b	"Win a Day With WordGirl"	Encounter, Squabble	Robyn Brown	Theodore "Tobey" MacCallister III	Console (bonus round)	March 14, 2013	512B
92	12	"Dinner or Consequences"	Feast, Consequences Vanish, Rely	Ryan Raddatz Scott Ganz and Andrew Samson	Dr. Two-Brains and the Energy Monster (Maria)	Flicker	March 15, 2013	513
93a	13a	"Father's Day Dance-a-thon"	Obsevere, Determine	Scott Ganz and Andrew Samson	The Butcher (no crimes committed)	Recline	June 14, 2013	508A
93b	13b	"Big is Botsford's Boss"	Blissful, Expertise	Ryan Raddatz	Mr. Big	Recline (bonus round)	June 14, 2013	508B

=== Season 6 (2013–14) ===
No. overall	No. in season	Title	Vocab words	Written by	Villains	May I Have a Word?	Original release date	Prod. code
94a	1a	"Who Wants to Get Rid of WordGirl"	Strategy, Giddy	Scott Ganz and Andrew Samson	Seymour Orlando Smooth with Dr. Two-Brains, Chuck the Evil Sandwich Making Guy, and Nocan the Contrarian	Recline	August 5, 2013	603A
94b	1b	"The Talented Mr. Birg"	Employee, Doppelganger	Jack Ferraiolo	Mr. Big	Recline (bonus round)	August 5, 2013	603B
95a	2a	"One Last Sandwich"	Final, Pacify	Eric Ledgin	Chuck the Evil Sandwich Making Guy and The Whammer	Apprehend	August 5, 2013	604A
95b	2b	"Caper or Plastic?"	Muffled, Flashback	Charles M. Howell and Gordon Bressack	Hal Hardbargain and The Masked Bagger (flashback only)	Apprehend (bonus round)	August 6, 2013	604B
96a	3a	"Tell Her What She's Won!"	Bombard, Emcee	Charles M. Howell and Gordon Bressack	Seymour Orlando Smooth	Fumble	August 7, 2013	605A
96b	3b	"Victoria is the Best...WordGirl?"	Fib, Mistaken	Ryan Raddatz	Victoria Best	Fumble (bonus round)	August 7, 2013	605B
97a	4a	"High-Five Sandwich"	Trendy, Eager	Ryan Raddatz	Chuck the Evil Sandwich Making Guy	Clutch	August 8, 2013	606A
97b	4b	"The Robot Problem"	Fuel, Cackle	Charles M. Howell and Gordon Bressack	Theodore "Tobey" MacCallister III and The Coach	Clutch (bonus round)	August 8, 2013	606B
98a	5a	"Of Two Minds"	Waver, Vast	Grant Moran	Dr. Two-Brains	Console	August 9, 2013	607A
98b	5b	"Yes Monkey"	Trance, Resign	Kevin Hopps	Mr. Big	Console (bonus round)	August 9, 2013	607B
99	6	"Invasion of the Bunny Lovers"	Delightful, Innovative Confidential, Global	Grant Moran Jack Ferraiolo	Mr. Big and Dr. Two-Brains	Perspire	April 14, 2014	613
100a	7a	"Big and Brent"	Dubious, Conspire	Ryan Young and Steve Young	Mr. Big	Flicker	June 2, 2014	608A
100b	7b	"Silence of the Whams"	Fragile, Burst	Charles M. Howell and Gordon Bressack	The Whammer	Flicker (bonus round)	June 2, 2014	608B
101a	8a	"Dr. Two-Brains, Mr. Cheese"	Command, Location/Locate	Ryan Raddatz	Dr. Two-Brains and Mr. Cheese	Cower	June 3, 2014	609A
101b	8b	"Kitty Cat Criminals"	Ornamental, Feline	Jack Ferraiolo	Chuck the Evil Sandwich Making Guy and The Butcher	Cower (bonus round)	June 3, 2014	609B
102a	9a	"A Questionable Pair"	Flatter, Tactic	Eric Ledgin	Ms. Question and Invisi-Bill	Dangle	June 4, 2014	610A
102b	9b	"All That Chazz"	Fascinated, Obey	Scott Ganz and Andrew Samson	Dr. Two-Brains	Dangle (bonus round)	June 4, 2014	610B
103a	10a	"Fortune Crookie"	Predict, Enthrall	Tom Sheppard	Seymour Orlando Smooth	Recline	June 5, 2014	611A
103b	10b	"Parsley, Sage, Rosemary and Crime"	Concoction, Elusive	Ryan Raddatz	Dr. Two-Brains	Recline (bonus round)	June 5, 2014	611B
104a	11a	"Go Gadget Go"	Brainstorm, Gadget	Scott Ganz and Andrew Samson	Theodore "Tobey" MacCallister III	Apprehend	June 6, 2014	612A
104b	11b	"Emergency Plan 999"	Courageous, Stunt	Ryan Raddatz	Dr. Two-Brains	Apprehend (bonus round)	June 6, 2014	612B

=== Season 7 (2014–15) ===
No. overall	No. in season	Title	Vocab words	Written by	Villains	May I Have a Word?	Original release date	Prod. code
105	1	"Kid Math"	Calculate, Equal/Equation Reproduce, Hint	Eric Ledgin Justin Shanes	Dr. Two-Brains	Elegant	August 4, 2014	712
106a	2a	"A Few Words from WordGirl"	Dawdle, Inspiration	Kevin Pederson	Dr. Two-Brains	Apprehend	August 5, 2014	708A
106b	2b	"Ears to You"	Original, Laughable	Will Shepard	Mr. Big	Apprehend (bonus round)	August 5, 2014	708B
107a	3a	"El Queso Mysterioso"	Illusion, Influence	John N. Huss	Dr. Two-Brains	Collection	August 6, 2014	711A
107b	3b	"Putt with Honor"	Concentrate, Tournament	Jayne Hamil	Eileen the Birthday Girl	Collection (bonus round)	August 6, 2014	711B
108a	4a	"It's Your Party and I'll Cry If I Want To"	Rampage, Sensitive	Tom Martin	Theodore "Tobey" MacCallister III	Doze	August 7, 2014	701A
108b	4b	"Becky's Bad-itude"	Juvenile, Lack	Jayne Hamil	Dr. Two-Brains	Doze (bonus round)	August 7, 2014	701B
109a	5a	"First One to Win Wins"	Victor, Fuming	Douglas Reid	The Butcher	Bewilder	August 8, 2014	702A
109b	5b	"A Little Bigger WordGirl"	Adjust, Elongate	Eric Ledgin	Dr. Two-Brains	Bewilder (bonus round)	August 8, 2014	702B
110a	6a	"Guess Who's Coming to Thanksgiving Dinner"	Grateful, Reluctant	Eric Ledgin	Theodore "Tobey" MacCallister III	Doze	November 26, 2014	709A
110b	6b	"Judging Butcher"	Appreciate ††, Lyrics	Dan Milledge	The Butcher	Doze (bonus round)	November 26, 2014	709B
111a	7a	"A Curious Case of Curiosity"	Privacy, Interrogate	Kevin Pederson	Ms. Question	Collection	December 3, 2014	703A
111b	7b	"There's No V in Team"	Swipe, Triumph	Andrew Samson	Victoria Best	Collection (bonus round)	December 3, 2014	703B
112a	8a	"Sparkling Clean"	Shirk, Unruly	Eric Ledgin	N/A	Elegant	December 5, 2014	704A
112b	8b	"The Smile Collector"	Unique, Repulsive	Ethan Banville	Chuck the Evil Sandwich Making Guy	Elegant (bonus round)	December 5, 2014	704B
113a	9a	"My Dad, My Teacher, My Dad, My Teacher"	Faculty, Expect	Jayne Hamil	The Butcher and Kid Potato	Imitate	December 17, 2014	705A
113b	9b	"The Power of Whamship"	Collaborate †, Solo	Eric Ledgin	The Whammer and Invisi-Bill	Imitate (bonus round)	December 17, 2014	705B
114a	10a	"Royally Framed"	Vain, Knickknack	Craig Carlisle	Lady Redundant Woman and Royal Dandy	Wedged	January 12, 2015	713A
114b	10b	"WordGirl vs. Tobey vs. the Dentist"	Appointment, Cavity	Ryan and Steve Young	Theodore "Tobey" MacCallister III	Wedged (bonus round)	January 12, 2015	713B
115a	11a	"Accordion to Tradition"	Hesitate, Select	Tom Martin	Granny May	Bewilder	January 16, 2015	710A
115b	11b	"Can't Touch This"	Property, Tinker	Amy Mass	The Whammer	Bewilder (bonus round)	January 16, 2015	710B
116a	12a	"Backyard Camping"	Portable, Farfetched	Guy Toubes	Energy Monster	Perspire	February 6, 2015	706A
116b	12b	"Castle! Dungeon! Fortress! So?"	Absorbed, Include	Danielle Koenig	Chuck the Evil Sandwich Making Guy	Perspire (bonus round)	February 6, 2015	706B
117a	13a	"News Girl"	Expose, Details	Ben Zelevansky	Energy Monster	Binoculars	February 20, 2015	707A
117b	13b	"Diorama Drama: The Scene of the Crime"	Confront, Diorama	Douglas Reid	The Amazing Rope Guy	Binoculars (bonus round)	February 20, 2015	707B

=== Season 8 (2015) ===
No. overall	No. in season	Title	Vocab words	Written by	Villains	May I Have a Word?	Original release date	Prod. code
118a	1a	"Patch Game"	Award, Eventually	Ben Zelevansky and Liz Breen	Theodore "Tobey" MacCallister III	Discard	June 10, 2015	805A
118b	1b	"Girls Day Out Throws Chuck"	Tranquil, Haven	Jayne Hamil and Tom Martin	Chuck the Evil Sandwich Making Guy	Discard (bonus round)	June 10, 2015	805B
119a	2a	"A Sticky Situation"	Adhesive, Precious	Eric Ledgin	Granny May	Scamper	June 12, 2015	808A
119b	2b	"Eight Legs vs. Two-Brains"	Volunteer, Habitat	Melissa Thomas	Dr. Two-Brains	Scamper (bonus round)	June 12, 2015	808B
120a	3a	"World's Best Dad"	Attempt, Combine/Combination	Ryan Raddatz	Victoria Best	Inflate	June 19, 2015	813A
120b	3b	"The Good Old, Bad Old Days"	Hazy, Reminisce	Will Shepard	The Butcher	Inflate (bonus round)	June 19, 2015	813B
121a	4a	"What Would WordGirl Do"	Amuse, Errand	Kevin Pederson	Energy Monster	Wedged	June 26, 2015	806A
121b	4b	"Granny's Corner"	Suggest, Pester	Rick Groel	Granny May	Wedged (bonus round)	June 26, 2015	806B
122a	5a	"Pineapple of My Eye"	Eradicate, Eureka	Phaea Crede and Justin Shatraw	Chuck the Evil Sandwich Making Guy	Irritable	July 8, 2015	803A
122b	5b	"Big Baby"	Hire, Dehydrate	Grant Moran	Mr. Big	Irritable (bonus round)	July 8, 2015	803B
123a	6a	"Staycation"	Balmy, Frigid	Guy Toubes	Mr. Big	Consume	July 10, 2015	804A
123b	6b	"Dr. No-Voice"	Hoarse, Modify	Eric Ledgin and Steve Young	Dr. Two-Brains	Consume (bonus round)	July 10, 2015	804B
124a	7a	"Trustworthy Tobey"	Trustworthy, Shipshape	Ryan Raddatz and Ethan Banville	Theodore "Tobey" MacCallister III	Inflate	July 15, 2015	807A
124b	7b	"The Tooth Hurts"	Absent, Mortified	Eric Kentoff	The Butcher	Inflate (bonus round)	July 15, 2015	807B
125a	8a	"Time-Out with Two-Brains"	Expire, Pause	Allen Glazier	Dr. Two-Brains	Irritable	July 17, 2015	809A
125b	8b	"Dr. WordGirl-Brains"	Permanent, Exchange	Ryan and Steve Young	Dr. Two-Brains	Irritable (bonus round)	July 17, 2015	809B
126a	9a	"Becky Knows Best"	Compatible, Certain	Carla Filisha	Chuck the Evil Sandwich Making Guy and Ms. Question	Inflate	July 22, 2015	801A
126b	9b	"As Something as Something"	Clutter, Simile	Will Shepard	Seymour Orlando Smooth	Inflate (bonus round)	July 22, 2015	801B
127a	10a	"The Ordinary, Extraordinary Botsfords"	Ordinary, Remarkable	Douglas Reid	The Butcher	Scamper	July 24, 2015	802A
127b	10b	"The Penny, the Pony and the Pirate"	Attend, Rare	Kevin Pederson	Captain Tangent	Scamper (bonus round)	July 24, 2015	802B
128a	11a	"Tim Botsford: Neighborhood Assistant"	Prevent, Assistant	John N. Huss	Chuck the Evil Sandwich Making Guy	Consume	July 31, 2015	810A
128b	11b	"Set Sail for the Bake Sale"	Distant, Transport	Ryan Raddatz	Nocan the Contrarian	Consume (bonus round)	July 31, 2015	810B
129a	12a	"The Best of the Bests"	Ancient, Twist	Eric Ledgin and Steve Young	Victor and Victoria Best	Discard	August 5, 2015	811A
129b	12b	"Art's Parts"	Evasive, Linger	Tom Martin and Liz Breen	The Learnerer	Discard (bonus round)	August 5, 2015	811B
130	13	"Rhyme and Reason"	Harmony, Resolve Forlorn, Chaos	Jack Ferraiolo	Rhyme and Reason (main), Dr. Two Brains, Chuck The Evil Sandwich Making Guy, Granny May, Theodore “Tobey” McCallister the III and the Butcher (cameos)	Wedged	August 7, 2015	812
