= Crystal Velasquez =

American writer

Crystal Velasquez is an author. She has written four books based on the PBS show Maya & Miguel, plus the books in the Your Life But... series. Velazquez currently lives in Flushing, Queens in New York City. She is also a production editor and a freelance proofreader.

== Education ==
Velasquez has a bachelor's degree in creative writing from Pennsylvania State University and is a graduate from the New York University Summer Publishing Institute.

== Maya and Miguel series ==
Velasquez has written a series of four books based on the show in the Maya and Miguel on PBS television

- Maya & Miguel: My Twin Brother / My Twin Sister (flip Chapter Book), ISBN 978-0439696036
- Neighborhood Friends (Maya & Miguel), ISBN 978-0439733847
- Maya & Miguel: The Valentine Machine, ISBN 978-0439789578
- Paint the Town, ISBN 978-0439830089

== Your Life But ... series ==
The Your Life But... series is targeted to Teens and Tweens. It is a Choose Your Own Adventure series with a twist: instead of just picking an option of what to do at the end of the chapter, you take a personality quiz. Your results direct you to another page of the book, where the story continues. There are currently three books in the series: Your Life But Better, Your Life But Cooler, and Your Life But Sweeter.

== Hunters of Chaos series ==
Four girls at a southwestern boarding school discover they have amazing feline powers and must unite to stop an ancient evil.

- Hunters of Chaos, ISBN 9781481424530
- The Circle of Lies, ISBN 9781481424554
