= PBS Kids Go! =

Former American educational television brand

- Network: PBS; PBS Kids
- Launched: October 11, 2004; 22 years ago
- Closed: October 6, 2013; 13 years ago
- Country of origin: United States
- Owner: PBS
- Headquarters: Arlington, Virginia, U.S.
- Format: Afternoon programming block
- Running time: 2–3 hours
- Original language: English
- Official website: www.pbskidsgo.org (archived October 2, 2013 from the original)

PBS Kids Go! was an American educational television brand used by PBS for programs aimed at early elementary school kids ages 6 to 8, in contrast to the younger, preschool target demographic of PBS Kids. Most PBS member stations aired the PBS Kids Go! block on weekdays during after-school hours, generally 3–6 pm depending on local station scheduling. In addition to the block, there was a PBS Kids Go! section on the PBS Kids website which featured games, videos, and other activities that were targeted towards older children. The brand was used on-air and online from October 11, 2004 through October 6, 2013.

== History ==
=== Development and launch ===
Upon recognizing that there were very few educational programs for elementary school children, with most of PBS Kids' programs being viewed by preschoolers, PBS wanted to focus more on including shows for and targeting older children. The PBS Kids Go! programming block was launched on October 11, 2004, alongside the premiere of brand new series Maya & Miguel and Postcards from Buster. Also part of the block were existing PBS Kids series Arthur and Cyberchase, both of which already targeted a slightly older audience.

=== Cancelled 24-hour channel ===
In 2005, PBS joined with Comcast and other production companies to form the cable channel PBS Kids Sprout, effectively replacing PBS' original 24-hour PBS Kids Channel. This left many local PBS stations with a vacancy on their multicast digital channel offerings (many filling it with a locally based PBS Kids channel), during a time when digital and high-definition broadcasts were increasing reach and gaining popularity. In April 2006, PBS announced plans for a replacement 24-hour digital multicast network called the PBS Kids Go! Channel. This would expand upon the afternoon PBS Kids Go! block on PBS, with additional new content and reruns of returning programs, such as HIT Entertainment's Wishbone and Kratts' Creatures. Other exclusive content for this channel would include a one-hour Spanish-language block called "PBS Kids Vayan!" (Spanish for "Go!"), which would air select shows in Spanish with English subtitles, an evening "Go! Family" block, and an educational "Go! Figure" school block.

The PBS Kids Go! Channel was originally set to launch in October 2006. However, stations found that the sliding scale licensing fees were too high for what little exclusive programming they would have received, especially after spending additional funds for the PBS HD feed. With only one-third of PBS stations initially committing to carry the new network, the plans for the channel were ultimately withdrawn.

PBS would later revive the 24/7 PBS Kids Channel on January 16, 2017 (a little over three years after the discontinuation of PBS Kids Go!), this time being structured as a multi-platform service with an online livestream of the channel on the PBS Kids website and video app, and would also utilize largely the same distribution methods that had been used for the original channel.

=== Later years ===
Despite the failure to launch the 24-hour PBS Kids Go! Channel, the PBS Kids Go! afternoon block continued to air on local PBS stations over the next several years and continued to expand its lineup with new series, such as Fetch! with Ruff Ruffman, WordGirl, The Electric Company, and Wild Kratts. Many stations also carried other series under the PBS Kids Go! brand, such as Design Squad and reruns of Wishbone, which typically aired over the weekend.

As online streaming began to increase in popularity, PBS developed the PBS Kids Go! video player on its website in 2008. This federally-funded, innovative video streaming platform featured video clips from a number of PBS Kids Go! shows which rotated on a weekly basis and linked to interactive online games. The video player would later evolve into the PBS Kids Video app, which is now the primary source for free streaming of on-demand video clips and full episodes of PBS Kids programming.

=== Closure ===
On May 15, 2013, PBS announced at their annual conference that the PBS Kids Go! brand would be discontinued in the fall, with all PBS Kids Go! programming rebranded with an updated, universal branding design across all of PBS's children's programming. PBS considered the nine-year long effort to age up its overall audience to be successful, but studies showed that brand recognition was not strongly differentiated from that of PBS Kids, and many shows ended up being successful with broad audiences in both younger and older age groups. PBS Kids Go! was officially discontinued on October 6, 2013, and PBS Kids was rebranded a day later, coinciding with the debut of Peg + Cat. After the shutdown and the rebrand, all shows that premiered before the launch of the PBS Kids Go! block returned to the main PBS Kids block, all shows that premiered during the PBS Kids Go! block were permanently moved to the main PBS Kids block, and the PBS Kids Go! website became a redirect to the PBS Kids website. However, as of November 2026, the URL is currently down, but PBS still owns the domain name.

== Programming ==
- ^{1} Premiered before the launch of PBS Kids Go!
- ^{2} Only aired as reruns.
- ^{3} Continued premiering new episodes after the closure of PBS Kids Go!

=== Former programming ===
==== Original programming ====
Title	Premiere date	End date
Arthur^{1} ^{3}	October 11, 2004	October 6, 2013
DragonflyTV^{1}	October 11, 2004	September 6, 2009
Cyberchase^{1} ^{3}	October 11, 2004	October 6, 2013
Postcards from Buster	October 11, 2004	February 25, 2012
Maya & Miguel	October 11, 2004	September 3, 2010
Fetch! with Ruff Ruffman	May 29, 2006	October 6, 2013
Design Squad	February 21, 2007	March 30, 2011
Wishbone^{1} ^{2}	June 2, 2007	September 6, 2009
WordGirl^{3}	September 3, 2007	October 6, 2013
Animalia	January 5, 2008	September 6, 2009
The Electric Company	January 19, 2009	October 6, 2013
SciGirls^{3}	February 11, 2010	October 6, 2013
Wild Kratts^{3}	January 3, 2011	October 6, 2013

== Shorts and web series ==
PBS Kids Go! aired shorts and other interstitial content related to its main programming, usually in between episodes or right before the end credits. Short-form programming included Cyberchase for Real (which premiered alongside Cyberchase in 2002), The Amazing Colossal Adventures of WordGirl (debuted on November 10, 2006, and later became a full series) and Oh Noah! (debuted as Noah Comprende on April 11, 2011), both of which were featured on air and online. As with many other PBS Kids shows, there was miscellaneous live-action interstitial content featuring children talking about things they do; about their families' heritage; or other topics specific to the associated program, typically used as a time-filler. In addition, there were web-exclusive short series on the PBS Kids Go! website, including Fizzy's Lunch Lab, Jim Henson's Wilson & Ditch: Digging America, and Chuck Vanderchuck's 'Something Something' Explosion. The PBS Kids Go! website was also home for new companion websites of canceled series Kratts' Creatures and Zoom, and other educational websites, such as KidsWorld Sports and It's My Life.

== Writing and illustrating contest ==
In 2009, PBS launched a writing and illustrating contest called PBS Kids Go! Writers Contest to continue the annual writing and illustrating competition for children in kindergarten through 3rd grade, which started in 1995 as the Reading Rainbow Young Writers and Illustrators Contest. In 2014, it was renamed to PBS Kids Writers Contest.
