= Big Bad Tomato =

- Company type: Private
- Founded: 2004
- Founder: Robert Bruza; Michael Bruza
- Headquarters: Los Angeles, California, United States
- Products: Interactive design & development
- Website: http://bigbadtomato.com/

Big Bad Tomato is a Los Angeles based interactive studio that specializes in kid and family based interactive experiences for web, mobile, and social applications.

Founded in 2004 by brothers Robert and Michael Bruza in a garage in Sherman Oaks, CA, Big Bad Tomato started as a design company for print, television and film, and web. By 2006, Big Bad Tomato was involved in interactive media, and has grown into a company with former or current clients that includes studios and publishers such as Disney, Warner Bros., DreamWorks Animation, PBS, Scholastic Corporation, and Random House.

In 2007, Terry Thoren, former CEO of Klasky Csupo, partnered with Big Bad Tomato and created the sister company, Rocket Fish Animation Studios.

Big Bad Tomato's capabilities include unique interactive online destinations, viral promotional activity, interactive marketing support, iPhone and iPad development, avatars, games, Facebook applications, and other custom digital applications for the new media marketplace.

Big Bad Tomato also owns and operates an animation studio in Manila, Philippines.
