= Maya & Miguel =

Television series

- Genre: Animated comedy Children's; Educational
- Created by: Deborah Forte; Carlos Darta
- Developed by: Deborah Forte; Beth Richman
- Directed by: Tony Kluck
- Voices of: Candi Milo; Nika Futterman; Carlos Alazraqui; Elizabeth Pena; Carlos Ponce; Lupe Ontiveros; Jerod Mixon; Lucy Liu; Beth Payne; Jeannie Elias
- Opening theme: Maya & Miguel Theme Song by David Ricard
- Ending theme: Maya & Miguel Theme Song (instrumental)
- Composers: Jack Livesey; David Ricard
- Country of origin: United States
- Original languages: English; Spanish
- No. of seasons: 5
- No. of episodes: 65

Production
- Executive producer: Deborah Forte
- Producers: Helen Kalafatic (S1); Machi Tantillo (S2-5)
- Editors: Kevin Messman; Tony Tedford
- Running time: 22 minutes
- Production company: Scholastic Productions

Original release
- Network: PBS Kids Go!
- Release: October 11, 2004 – October 10, 2007

Maya & Miguel is an American animated children's television series produced by Scholastic Productions. It aired on PBS Kids Go! from October 11, 2004, to October 10, 2007, and had a total of five seasons and 65 episodes over three years. The show also ran on Univision's Saturday morning Planeta U block.

The series focuses on the lives of pre-teen Hispanic twins named Maya and Miguel Santos and their friends, the program is aimed at promoting multiculturalism and education. At various times throughout the episode, parts of the dialogue are in Spanish, but only individual words or phrases are then explained in English.

== Premise ==
The show presents learning as fun, relevant and rewarding for all children, with a special emphasis on the Hispanic and Latino population. The show chronicles the adventures of two 10-year-old Latino twin siblings, Maya and Miguel Santos, as they figure out how to leave their stamp on the world around them, and features their relatives and diverse neighborhood friends. This show centers on Maya's well-intentioned meddling in her family and friends' lives, ultimately creating new quandaries to fix. Their mother is from Mexico, and their father is from Puerto Rico. The underlying message is the importance of doing good for the family and community, and the philosophy that shared happiness is greater than personal gain. The show presents a positive, culturally rich portrayal of Latino families, languages and cultures. In some markets, each episode ends with Maya announcing, "Here's what some of our friends are up to," introducing live-action clips of children engaging and interacting in ways consistent with the show's themes. Maya concludes episodes by exhorting viewers to "visit your local library like 'Maya & Miguel'".

== Characters ==
All characters of Maya & Miguel, from left to right: Andy Arlington, Theo McEwen, Miguel Santos, Paco the Parrot, Alberto "Tito" Chávez, Maya Santos, Chrissy Lum, and Maggie Lee.

=== Main ===
- Maya Santos (voiced by Candi Milo) is a sweet, gentle, and energetic Mexican and Puerto Rican girl. She always manages to include her twin brother, Miguel, and friends in her crazy adventures. Whenever Maya comes up with an idea, she always says "¡Éso es!" (That's it!) and her hair bobbles light up while her ponytail quickly spins around; as shown in "The Bet" they will continue to glow until she says "¡Éso es!" She can sometimes be very stubborn, ignorant, and naive, and tends to get involved in other people's business instead of her own. Although her ideas often don't go the way she plans them, they always accomplish their original objective in the end.
- Miguel Santos (voiced by Nika Futterman) is Maya's twin brother. Miguel is slightly more practical and sensible than his twin sister, and enjoys playing soccer and video games. Every time Maya gets an idea, he gets a bad feeling about it. He knows Maya means well, but he thinks she gets more involved in other people's problems than her own. He keeps track of Maya's ideas that have gone wrong, much to Maya's annoyance. However, he would sometimes admit that an idea of hers is the best idea yet. He has a big crush on a girl named Kylie, who feels the same way.

=== Supporting ===
- Theodore "Theo" McEwen (voiced by Jerod Mixon) is Miguel's African-American best friend and soccer buddy. Theo loves sports as much as Miguel does. Theo often gets straight A's in his classes, arguably making him the most intelligent of the kids. Theo is often the voice of reason among his friends.
- Margaret "Maggie" Lee (voiced by Lucy Liu) is Maya's Chinese-American friend. She is very dramatic, kind, fashionable and talented. She rarely disagrees with Maya's ideas.
- Christine "Chrissy" Lum (voiced by Beth Payne) is Maya's Dominican-American friend, and describes herself as Afro-Dominican. She is very sensitive and level-headed, though sometimes she can also be a little gullible. Chrissy tends to point out the flaws in Maya's plans a lot, similar to Miguel. She also loves animals and has a pet cat in one episode.
- Andrew "Andy" Arlington (voiced by Jeannie Elias) is another friend of Miguel's. He is an English-American handicapped boy who was born with only one arm. Often seen in the background with Miguel and Theo, he likes to play soccer, basketball, and baseball. Andy moved to Maya and Miguel's neighborhood from Wisconsin.
- Alberto "Tito" Chávez (voiced by Candi Milo) is Maya and Miguel's cousin who moved to the United States from Mexico with his parents. He lives in the same apartment complex. He really admires his cousin Miguel; in the episode "I've Got to Be 'Mi-Guel'" he is shown pretending to act as if he is Miguel. He loves to play soccer like the twins.
- Abuela Elena Chávez (voiced by Lupe Ontiveros) is Maya and Miguel's maternal grandmother who's originally from Mexico.
- Paco (voiced by Carlos Alazraqui) is an anthropomorphic and energetic bilingual macaw who is the twins' pet, originally owned by their abuela. Most commonly heard saying "Pretty Bird" and "What about Paco, what about Paco?" He often gets loose, causing much trouble and confusion around the house. Paco also often reacts a lot to figures of speech, thinking they are real.
- Rosa Santos (voiced by Elizabeth Peña) is Santiago's wife and Maya and Miguel's mother who's originally from Mexico.
- Santiago Santos (voiced by Carlos Ponce) is Rosa's husband and Maya and Miguel's father who's originally from Puerto Rico.

== Episodes ==
Note: All episodes of the series were directed by Tony Kluck.

=== Series overview ===
Season	Episodes	Originally released	
Season	Episodes	First released	Last released
1	13	October 11, 2004	November 11, 2004
2	13	November 12, 2004	May 6, 2005
3	13	May 5, 2005	September 25, 2006
4	13	November 18, 2005	October 2, 2007
5	13	February 14, 2006	October 10, 2007

=== Season 1 (2004) ===
No. overall	No. in season	Title	Written by	Original release date	Prod. code
1	1	"Mala Suerte"	Luisa Leshin	October 11, 2004	101
When the usually meticulous Rosa scorches the family breakfast, Maya thinks the apartment is cursed with bad luck. Maya, Miguel and the gang redecorate the entire place in an effort to restore positive energy before Santiago brings home an important supplier for dinner that evening.
2	2	"The Matchmaker"	Silvia Cardenas	October 12, 2004	102
Maya sees Abuela Elena dancing alone after dinner, she decides that her grandmother's cheery exterior is masking a deep loneliness - and that Abuela Elena needs to be fixed up on a date. Maya's big idea launches a quest for an eligible sixty-something bachelor, the mother of all makeovers, and a blind date that doesn't go as planned.
3	3	"When Maya Met Andy"	Madellaine Paxson	October 13, 2004	103
Miguel recalls the time that Andy, a boy who is missing an arm, moved into the neighborhood.
4	4	"The Autograph"	Jonathan Greenberg	October 14, 2004	104
When Paco unwittingly flushes Miguel's favorite Orlando Flores baseball card down the toilet, Maya decides to fix the situation by getting an autograph from Orlando himself, who is coming to town that weekend with his team.
5	5	"Rhymes with "Gato""	Joe Purdy	October 15, 2004	105
When Chrissy's kitten runs away, Maya and her friends put up signs and spread the word about the lost "gato." Unfortunately, Maggie's Spanish is terrible, and she tells people they're missing a "pato" - a duck.
6	6	"La Nueva Cocinita"	Andy Yerkes	October 18, 2004	106
Maya and Miguel are searching with their Abuela Elena for treasures through her seemingly bottomless trunk of memories, they happen upon an old menu from her defunct restaurant "La Cocinita." Enlisting her friends to be the kitchen and wait staff, Maya prepares for the big opening night.
7	7	"The Letter"	Evelina Fernandez	October 19, 2004	107
Maya finds an abandoned letter on Miguel's desk, written to a pretty girl in their class named Esperanza. Thinking that her brother might need a little help in making friends, Maya (with the eager assistance of Maggie and Chrissy) tells Esperanza how wonderful Miguel is. No sooner does Esperanza decide that Miguel is the coolest boy in the 5th grade than Maya learns that the real author of the letter wasn't Miguel, but Andy!
8	8	"Teacher's Pet"	Madellaine Paxson	October 20, 2004	108
When Paco stops speaking, Maya and Santiago take him to the vet, who tells them that the poor parrot is simply lonely staying at home all day. Maya solves the problem by taking Paco to school with her. But when Paco gives wrong answers in front of the class, accidentally insults kids in the hall, and eventually flies off somewhere in the school, Maya has a lot of problems to solve all at once.
9	9	"La Calavera"	Chris Nee	November 2, 2004	109
When Maya wants to add some oomph to her presentation about Mexico for school, she consults her Abuela Elena, who allows her to borrow a prized possession: a calavera, or skull made of sugar, that is used in the yearly Day of the Dead celebration. Maya promises to let nothing happen to this special calavera. Her presentation goes well, but Maya loses the calavera!
10	10	"Politics Unusual"	Chris Nee	November 8, 2004	110
Maggie wants to star in the upcoming School Assembly Day show. Unfortunately, someone else decides to run, an unassuming kid named Simon.
11	11	"Tito's Mexican Vacation"	Catherine Lieuwen	November 9, 2004	111
Maya notices something's wrong with Tito. It all starts when Tito gets a postcard from his cousins in Mexico. Tito misses them and misses his former home. Maya, eager to help her cousin feel better, decides that if they can't take Tito back to Mexico, they'll bring Mexico to Tito!
12	12	"Prince Tito"	Luisa Leshin	November 10, 2004	112
To help Tito overcome his stage fright, Maya convinces him to audition for a community theater performance called "Prince Tito." Maya promises Tito that she'll get the female lead and be right with him onstage the whole time. But when the director casts Tito in the lead and Maya in a bit part, Tito is bound for stardom - but only if Maya can find a way to keep him from freezing up in front of the audience on opening night.
13	13	"The Bully and the Bunny"	Andy Yerkes	November 11, 2004	113
A hulking new kid named Jimmy McCorkle moves in across the street and - at least it seems to Miguel and his friends - begins to bully everyone around.

=== Season 2 (2004–05) ===
No. overall	No. in season	Title	Written by	Original release date	Prod. code
14	1	"Family Time"	Buddy Chuck Jr.	November 12, 2004	114
Maya concludes that everyone have been missing "family time" - quality time spent alone as a family. However, Maya and Miguel plan a camping trip to a state park - and do all the planning and packing themselves to make things easier on their very busy parents and grandmother.
15	2	"Surprise, Surprise"	Chris Nee	January 17, 2005	115
Chrissy is sad because the pop star Enrique has not answered the hundreds of fan letters she has sent. So Maya decides to cheer her up with a surprise birthday party.
16	3	"An "Okri"-Dokey Day"	Buddy Chuck Jr.	January 18, 2005	116
When Maya realizes that their neighbors Greg and Isoka Okri don't have any children of their own, she concludes that their life must be horribly empty - after all, her parents are always saying how Maya and Miguel are the light of their lives. So Maya engineers things so she and Miguel spend the better part of a weekend with the Okris.
17	4	"Chrissy's Big Move"	Catherine Lieuwen	January 19, 2005	117
Chrissy discovers that her father has been transferred and is moving the whole family to Hong Kong. She is so distraught that she doesn't want to go. Eager to help her friend adjust to a very different culture, Maya enlists Miguel and the gang to "introduce" Chrissy to Hong Kong.
18	5	"Career Day"	Chris Nee	January 20, 2005	118
It's Career Day in Maya and Miguel's class, and each kid gets to spend a whole day with a classmate's parent or grandparent as a "mentor." While Miguel lucks into spending the day with an astronaut, Maya ends up with Mort, an insurance salesman who has lost his belief in himself. Maya takes it upon herself to find Mort a new career, but ultimately discovers that what he really needs is simply some help restoring his confidence.
19	6	"I've Got to be "Mi-Guel""	Chris Nee	January 21, 2005	119
Tito really admires his big cousin Miguel. He begins to feel bad about himself - after all, Miguel does everything so well, it's sometimes hard to measure up. At Maya's inadvertent suggestion, Tito realizes there is one way to be just as cool as Miguel.
20	7	"Soccer Mom"	Chris Nee	February 11, 2005	120
When Maya and Miguel's soccer coach leaves to become a professional player, the gang is left without a coach. Maya notices that her mom is a fairly adept player and perhaps she should be the new soccer coach.
21	8	"The Adventures of Rabbit-Bird Man"	Chris Nee	February 16, 2005	121
Miguel enters a comic book contest. Before he can finish his original comic book loosely based on Aztec mythology entitled, "The Adventures of Rabbit-Bird Man," Miguel comes down with a bad cold. Miguel has left the hero in grave jeopardy, and he implores Maya to finish the comic book and save him. Maya rounds up the gang to help her think of a way to save the hero from the bad guy.
22	9	"Maya and Miguel, Come on Down!"	Rachelle Romberg	February 17, 2005	122
Maya and Miguel seem to have an aptitude for their favorite TV game show. But when they decide to audition, they discover that they have very different approaches to training.
23	10	"The Wrestler Next Door"	Jon M. Gibson and Jorge R. Gutiérrez	February 18, 2005	123
A new neighbor moves into the apartment building: Sr. Lopez, who is opening a new bakery in town. Tito is certain that Sr. Lopez is actually "El Guamazo Lopez," a famous Mexican masked wrestler! He tries to prove it to a skeptical Maya and Miguel... but when they see some intriguing evidence, they decide to help Tito find out the truth.
24	11	"A Little Culture"	Chris Nee	May 3, 2005	124
When Maya forgets to buy tickets for the summer blockbuster movie all her friends are eagerly awaiting, she desperately suggests that they go instead to the Natural History Museum.
25	12	"The Bet"	Madellaine Paxson	May 4, 2005	125
When Maya comes to believe that Miguel has grown overly obsessed with playing video games, she challenges him to go cold turkey. He agrees -- on the condition that she refrain from meddling in other people's business. Whoever gives in first will do the other's chores for two weeks. Miguel has to summon all his strength to resist the lure of electronic games, while Maya is going batty trying to keep herself from offering advice to friends in need.
26	13	"The Cheery Chipper Cupid Sisters"	Chris Nee	May 6, 2005	126
Maya, Chrissy, and Maggie are in love with the new girls action cartoon, "The Cheery Chipper Cupid Sisters". Only a very surreal experience of trying to find a bird-napped Paco makes Maya realize that perhaps she's taken this latest fad a bit too far.

=== Season 3 (2005–06) ===
No. overall	No. in season	Title	Written by	Original release date	Prod. code
27	1	"Team Santos"	Chris Nee	May 5, 2005	127
Maya accidentally sets off an air horn during an important soccer play, ruining Miguel's kick and losing the game for him. Feeling terrible, she takes Miguel to a carnival to cheer him up.
28	2	"Friends Forever?"	Chris Nee	October 21, 2005	128
Maya's friends get into an argument and split up. Meanwhile, Theo and Andy discover that Miguel has been secretly coaching each of them for an open position on the soccer team.
29	3	"The Slump"	Catherine Lieuwen	July 15, 2005	129
When Miguel's baseball batting average drops off the charts, the bad vibes begin to extend into all areas of his life. In a desperate attempt to help Miguel regain his magic, Andy and Theo put Miguel through a series of slump-busting exercises... but nothing works, and Miguel quits the team. Meanwhile, Maya is on a mission to get the team new uniforms through sponsorship from neighbors.
30	4	"The Dogwalkers"	Catherine Lieuwen	October 13, 2005	130
In order to send their neighbor, the retired Broadway dancer Mrs. Salviati, to her high school reunion, Maya and Miguel decide to open a pet care business to raise money for the plane fare.
31	5	"Recipe for Disaster"	Rachelle Romberg	October 11, 2005	131
Maya wants to win an award offered to the student who donates the most books to a local book fair, so she collects every unwanted volume from her apartment, including some old cookbooks of Rosa's. The only problem is that Rosa has an old friend coming to visit, and she needs a favorite recipe from one of the books that Maya gave away. Now Maya and Miguel have to get the book back before Rosa's friend arrives.
32	6	"The Pen-Pal"	Catherine Lieuwen	October 14, 2005	132
For school, Miguel is assigned an electronic pen-pal from Puerto Rico. When they start corresponding, Miguel thinks his pen-pal, Roman, has a much more glamorous life than he does. So, with a little prompting from Paco, Miguel slowly starts embellishing the details of his life. Then, to his horror, Roman comes to visit.
33	7	"Abuela Upmanship"	Catherine Lieuwen	October 12, 2005	133
Maya is sick about hearing how wonderful Lola's grandmother is - she seems to do everything just perfectly. Maya feels her own Abuela is pretty great and wants her to be recognized too. So she happens to mention that Abuela used to be a movie star! Now Maya has to prevent her friends and neighbors from discovering that Abuela's acting career was limited to a supporting role in a high school play.
34	8	"Fashionistas"	Catherine Lieuwen	October 28, 2005	134
When the girls decide that the school needs a fashion show, Miguel agrees to help out. The problem is, he didn't know he agreed to actually be a model. What's more, in the audience is going to be the new coach of the local soccer travel team - which Miguel is trying out for. Miguel, worried that the coach won't want a player who dresses up in outrageous clothes for a fashion show, has to decide whether to participate or whether to "take a dive."
35	9	"Maya Quixote and Miguel Panza"	Jon M. Gibson and Jorge R. Gutiérrez	November 4, 2005	135
Maya reads Don Quixote de la Mancha and is inspired by the themes of truth, honor, and courage found in the novel. When Miguel's favorite flavor of ice cream is discontinued, she decides they must go on a Don Quixote-style quest to get the flavor reinstated.
36	10	"The Taming of Mr. Shue"	Jule Selbo	November 11, 2005	136
When the beloved teacher Mrs. Langley leaves to have a baby, the kids get a long-term substitute, Mr. Shue.
37	11	"Tito's Pet"	Bruce Akiyama	January 6, 2006	137
After a school-wide pet fair, Tito is upset because the winners, Freddy and Cesar Castillo, make fun of his tarantula and gloat about winning the first prize.
38	12	"Real Twins"	Catherine Lieuwen	October 10, 2005	138
When a TV commercial announces that a new reality show about twins called "Real Twins" is looking for entrants, Maya thinks that she and Miguel should sign up.
39	13	"Give Me a Little Sign"	Catherine Lieuwen	September 25, 2006	139
Tito befriends a new boy, Marco, who is deaf. Marco starts to teach Tito some American Sign Language, and they decide to do a project together for the school's "Contraption Convention." But when Tito has trouble pronouncing some words, such as "yellow" and "fish", he decides he doesn't want to do the project anymore, since it involves public speaking.

=== Season 4 (2005–07) ===
No. overall	No. in season	Title	Written by	Original release date	Prod. code
40	1	"A Star is Born"	Chris Nee	January 20, 2006	140
Santiago is going to make a television commercial for his pet store, but when Maya hears what he has in mind, she decides to take over and produce something flashier, to really draw in customers.
41	2	"Paper Girl"	Rachelle Romberg	January 27, 2006	141
Maya decides that the lackluster school newspaper needs some zing, so she agrees to be editor and enlists all her friends to help out.
42	3	"Miguel's Wonderful Life"	Jonathan Greenberg	November 25, 2005	142
It's Christmas, and the Santos family is getting ready for the festivities. After Maya accidentally ruins one of Miguel's paintings he angrily declares that he wishes he never had Maya as his sister. The next day, he awakens to find that his wish has come true that Maya doesn't exist and nobody's ever heard of her.
43	4	"The Video"	Jule Selbo	January 13, 2006	143
Abuela's old friend from Mexico, Carlota, cancels a planned visit and the former is heartbroken. To cheer her up, Maya, Miguel, and their friends decide to make a secret "surprise" video of "A Day in the Life" of their grandmother.
44	5	"Decisions, Decisions"	Chris Nee	October 3, 2006	144
Maya and Miguel are thrilled when they win tickets to an extreme sports competition. However, they're disappointed to see they have only four tickets, not enough for them to bring all their friends. The twins devise competitions to decide which two of their four friends will get their extra tickets.
45	6	"A Rose is Still a Rose"	Catherine Lieuwen	October 4, 2006	145
When Abuela Elena leaves town for a few days, she entrusts an eager Maya with the care and feeding of her prized roses. Meanwhile, Miguel wants to become a wrestler and begins taking lessons from Gus "El Guamazo" Lopez, former luchador.
46	7	"Role Reversal"	Catherine Lieuwen	October 5, 2006	146
When Maya and Miguel keep talking about how easy their parents' lives seem to be, the children and parents decide to switch roles for a day. Maya and Miguel run the pet store and keep the apartment in order, while Rosa and Santiago spend the day at dance, soccer, and the "activities fun club."
47	8	"After School"	Madellaine Paxson	October 6, 2006	147
After Maggie arrives late for class one day and interrupts Mr. Nguyen’s class with her complaints, he issues her an "after school" requiring her to stay late one day. Maggie is appalled, since this has never happened to her before, and she tries every trick in her book to get Mr. Nguyen to change his mind.
48	9	"The Wedding"	Catherine Lieuwen	October 1, 2007	148
Rosa's cousin Angelina got engaged and shares her fantasy for the perfect wedding with the Santos family over dinner, the grim-faced groom arrives with some news: he has received a promotion that will take him out of the country. Maya proclaims that they can host the wedding at their house, and have everything ready in just two days!
49	10	"Puppy Love"	Catherine Lieuwen	January 15, 2007	149
A fat little dog follows Miguel home one day, he doesn't have the heart to leave it alone in the street at nightfall, and he brings it inside. The next day, Miguel opens his closet door to discover that the fat little dog had puppies!
50	11	"Mother's Day"	Catherine Lieuwen	May 12, 2006	150
When Maya and Miguel have bought their mother a cat-shaped potholder, but their friends are not impressed. She and Miguel decide to make a facial mask for their mother.
51	12	"The Big Fight"	Jule Selbo	October 2, 2007	151
When Theo and Miguel have a big fight about a remote-controlled race-car derby, Maya takes it upon herself to set things right between the two estranged friends. But whatever she does only seems to make things worse.
52	13	"The Best Thanksgiving Ever"	Catherine Lieuwen	November 18, 2005	152
Santiago's mother, Tata Santos, is coming from Puerto Rico for Thanksgiving, and Maya and Miguel want to make sure that she gets to have the best Thanksgiving ever.

=== Season 5 (2006–07) ===
No. overall	No. in season	Title	Written by	Original release date	Prod. code
53	1	"Cupid"	Catherine Lieuwen	February 14, 2006	153
When Miguel is chosen to be his school's Cupid, he dumps the costume he's supposed to wear but realizes the true meaning of Valentine's Day after helping Maya giving the right Valentine's Day cards to their neighborhood.
54	2	"Papi Joins the Band"	Catherine Lieuwen	June 15, 2007	154
Miguel, Theo, and Andy decide to enter a talent contest at the Community Center by putting together a band. When Santiago hears the news, he tells the boys that he used to have his own band, and he offers his services. The problem is that Santiago soon goes from offering gentle advice to becoming a fourth member of the band, and Miguel has to find a way to tell his father to let the boys do it their own way.
55	3	"Crushed"	Madellaine Paxson	October 3, 2007	155
Miguel gets a crush on a new substitute teacher, Miss Cisneros, and studies crazy in her class. Meanwhile, Tito reveals his secret over the school PA system.
56	4	"The Red Jacket"	Evelina Fernandez	January 16, 2007	156
Miguel picks up a very special "Melissa Rojas" jacket for Kylie as a birthday gift. But when Maya discovers it, she thinks it's a gift for her - and won't take it off.
57	5	"Maya the Mascot"	Catherine Lieuwen	January 18, 2007	157
Maya is a big hit as the parrot mascot for Miguel's community basketball team. But when Miguel turns his ankle, Maya has to help take care of him, and has to miss the games. After all, she can't be in two places at once.
58	6	"Good Luck Paco"	John Reynolds	October 4, 2007	158
After a couple of coincidences, the kids become convinced that Paco is a good luck charm. At first it's great fun, but soon Paco is in so much demand to give everyone good fortune that the poor parrot is getting worn out.
59	7	"Paging Dr. Maya"	Jon M. Gibson and Jorge R. Gutiérrez	May 4, 2007	159
When a break from school comes, Maya tries to volunteer at the Community Center bingo game, but ends up accidentally wreaking havoc. One of the bingo players recommends Maya to volunteer for his daughter, Dr. DasGupta the veterinarian, Maya jumps at the chance.
60	8	"The Battle of the Birthdays"	Mike Cevallos & Gibby Cevallos	January 17, 2007	160
Maya and Miguel plan to have separate birthday parties.
61	9	"Say Cheese!"	Jon M. Gibson and Jorge R. Gutiérrez	October 8, 2007	161
School picture day is coming up and the girls are excited to look their best for the big day. But Maggie, much to her dismay, gets braces put on just before the shoot. Maya does everything she can to make things better for her friend, but nothing seems to be working.
62	10	"A House Divided"	Jon M. Gibson and Jorge R. Gutiérrez	October 9, 2007	162
Tired of constantly bumping into each other, Maya and Miguel opt to split the apartment in half.
63	11	"Every Day is Earth Day"	Jon M. Gibson and Jorge R. Gutiérrez	April 21, 2006	163
For a school Earth Day project, the kids decide to clean up an old lot and plant a community garden. But as the deadline approaches, a rainstorm hits, turning the patch of dirt into a muddy mess.
64	12	"The Big Idea"	Jon M. Gibson and Jorge R. Gutiérrez	January 19, 2007	164
Miguel's soccer team has made it to the championships, and he's nervous. Maya has a great idea to quell his nerves: intensive training the morning of the game. Miguel is skeptical of Maya's idea, worried that he might be late to catch the bus to the game, but Maya assures him she will keep him on schedule.
65	13	"I Love Maya"	Jon M. Gibson and Jorge R. Gutiérrez	October 10, 2007	165
Maya learns that the director's new play centers her until she learns that the main character sleeps through the whole play. Despite the fact that she has no lines, Maya has fun, and learns the value of keeping her promises.

== Broadcast history and streaming ==
In the United States, the series originally premiered on October 11, 2004, (along with Postcards from Buster) on PBS Kids Go!. The final episode aired on October 10, 2007. As of 2026, California PBS stations KLCS and KVCR-DT still carry the show.

Internationally, the series aired on CBBC in the United Kingdom. It also aired on Boomerang in Latin America and Brazil both debuting on June 3, 2006. In France, the show aired on France 5 and Gulli. In Turkey, the show aired on TV8 (Turkish TV channel). In Israel, it aired on Arutz HaYeladim. It also aired on Nickelodeon in Australia. In the Philippines, it aired on ABS-CBN. Maya & Miguel is available on Tubi and The Roku Channel.

== Home media ==
DVD releases
Name	Season(s)	Release dates	No. of episodes	Included episodes	Time Length
Name	Season(s)	Region 1	No. of episodes	Included episodes	Time Length
Funny Fix-Ups	1	September 13, 2005	4	"The Matchmaker", "Teacher's Pet", "When Maya Met Andy", and "Mala Suerte"	88 minutes
Twice the Fun	1	September 13, 2005	4	"The Letter", "The Autograph", "Rhymes with "Gato"", and "La Nueva Cocinita"	88 minutes
Cinco De Maya	1	April 18, 2006	5	"La Calavera", "Tito's Mexican Vacation", "Surprise, Surprise", "I've Got to be Mi-guel", and "The Adventures of Rabbit-Bird Man"	110 minutes
Cinco De Maya	2	April 18, 2006	5	"La Calavera", "Tito's Mexican Vacation", "Surprise, Surprise", "I've Got to be Mi-guel", and "The Adventures of Rabbit-Bird Man"	110 minutes

There have been three Maya & Miguel DVD and VHS releases released by Lionsgate Home Entertainment. In addition, the entire series is available on digital purchase.

== Books ==
- Author Crystal Velasquez has written four books based on the "Maya & Miguel" series.
